= List of minor planets: 1001–2000 =

The following is a partial list of minor planets, running from minor-planet number 1001 through 2000, inclusive. The primary data for this and other partial lists is based on JPL's "Small-Body Orbital Elements" and data available from the Minor Planet Center. Critical list information is also provided by the MPC, unless otherwise specified from Lowell Observatory. A detailed description of the table's columns and additional sources are given on the main page including a complete list of every page in this series, and a statistical break-up on the dynamical classification of minor planets.

Also see the summary list of all named bodies in numerical and alphabetical order, and the corresponding naming citations for the number range of this particular list. New namings may only be added to this list after official publication, as the preannouncement of names is condemned by the Working Group for Small Bodies Nomenclature of the International Astronomical Union.

Near-Earth obj.	MBA (inner)	MBA (outer)	Centaur
Mars-crosser	MBA (middle)	Jupiter trojan	Trans-Neptunian obj.
Unclassified

== 1001–1100 ==
Designation			Discovery			Properties		Ref
Permanent	Provisional	Named after	Date	Site	Discoverer(s)	Category	Diam.	Ref
1001 Gaussia	1923 OA	Gaussia	August 8, 1923	Crimea-Simeis	S. Belyavsky	·	73 km (45 mi)	MPC · JPL
1002 Olbersia	1923 OB	Olbersia	August 15, 1923	Crimea-Simeis	V. Albitskij	·	23 km (14 mi)	MPC · JPL
1003 Lilofee	1923 OK	Lilofee	September 13, 1923	Heidelberg	K. Reinmuth	THM ·	34 km (21 mi)	MPC · JPL
1004 Belopolskya	1923 OS	Belopolskya	September 5, 1923	Crimea-Simeis	S. Belyavsky	CYB	72 km (45 mi)	MPC · JPL
1005 Arago	1923 OT	Arago	September 5, 1923	Crimea-Simeis	S. Belyavsky	·	61 km (38 mi)	MPC · JPL
1006 Lagrangea	1923 OU	Lagrangea	September 12, 1923	Crimea-Simeis	S. Belyavsky	·	35 km (22 mi)	MPC · JPL
1007 Pawlowia	1923 OX	Pawlowia	October 5, 1923	Crimea-Simeis	V. Albitskij	slow	18 km (11 mi)	MPC · JPL
1008 La Paz	1923 PD	La Paz	October 31, 1923	Heidelberg	M. F. Wolf	·	41 km (25 mi)	MPC · JPL
1009 Sirene	1923 PE	Sirene	October 31, 1923	Heidelberg	K. Reinmuth	·	6.3 km (3.9 mi)	MPC · JPL
1010 Marlene	1923 PF	Marlene	November 12, 1923	Heidelberg	K. Reinmuth	·	47 km (29 mi)	MPC · JPL
1011 Laodamia	1924 PK	Laodamia	January 5, 1924	Heidelberg	K. Reinmuth	·	10 km (6.2 mi)	MPC · JPL
1012 Sarema	1924 PM	Sarema	January 12, 1924	Heidelberg	K. Reinmuth	·	21 km (13 mi)	MPC · JPL
1013 Tombecka	1924 PQ	Tombecka	January 17, 1924	Algiers	B. Jekhovsky	·	35 km (22 mi)	MPC · JPL
1014 Semphyra	1924 PW	Semphyra	January 29, 1924	Heidelberg	K. Reinmuth	·	17 km (11 mi)	MPC · JPL
1015 Christa	1924 QF	Christa	January 31, 1924	Heidelberg	K. Reinmuth	·	82 km (51 mi)	MPC · JPL
1016 Anitra	1924 QG	Anitra	January 31, 1924	Heidelberg	K. Reinmuth	moon	9.5 km (5.9 mi)	MPC · JPL
1017 Jacqueline	1924 QL	Jacqueline	February 4, 1924	Algiers	B. Jekhovsky	·	40 km (25 mi)	MPC · JPL
1018 Arnolda	1924 QM	Arnolda	March 3, 1924	Heidelberg	K. Reinmuth	·	17 km (11 mi)	MPC · JPL
1019 Strackea	1924 QN	Strackea	March 3, 1924	Heidelberg	K. Reinmuth	H	7.2 km (4.5 mi)	MPC · JPL
1020 Arcadia	1924 QV	Arcadia	March 7, 1924	Heidelberg	K. Reinmuth	AGN	10 km (6.2 mi)	MPC · JPL
1021 Flammario	1924 RG	Flammario	March 11, 1924	Heidelberg	M. F. Wolf	·	101 km (63 mi)	MPC · JPL
1022 Olympiada	1924 RT	Olympiada	June 23, 1924	Crimea-Simeis	V. Albitskij	·	34 km (21 mi)	MPC · JPL
1023 Thomana	1924 RU	Thomana	June 25, 1924	Heidelberg	K. Reinmuth	·	58 km (36 mi)	MPC · JPL
1024 Hale	YO 13	Hale	December 2, 1923	Williams Bay	G. Van Biesbroeck	slow	43 km (27 mi)	MPC · JPL
1025 Riema	1923 NX	Riema	August 12, 1923	Heidelberg	K. Reinmuth	H	4.6 km (2.9 mi)	MPC · JPL
1026 Ingrid	1923 NY	Ingrid	August 13, 1923	Heidelberg	K. Reinmuth	·	7.4 km (4.6 mi)	MPC · JPL
1027 Aesculapia	YO 11	Aesculapia	November 11, 1923	Williams Bay	G. Van Biesbroeck	THM	31 km (19 mi)	MPC · JPL
1028 Lydina	1923 PG	Lydina	November 6, 1923	Crimea-Simeis	V. Albitskij	CYB	89 km (55 mi)	MPC · JPL
1029 La Plata	1924 RK	La Plata	April 28, 1924	La Plata Observatory	J. Hartmann	KOR	21 km (13 mi)	MPC · JPL
1030 Vitja	1924 RQ	Vitja	May 25, 1924	Crimea-Simeis	V. Albitskij	·	60 km (37 mi)	MPC · JPL
1031 Arctica	1924 RR	Arctica	June 6, 1924	Crimea-Simeis	S. Belyavsky	·	75 km (47 mi)	MPC · JPL
1032 Pafuri	1924 SA	Pafuri	May 30, 1924	Johannesburg	H. E. Wood	slow	66 km (41 mi)	MPC · JPL
1033 Simona	1924 SM	Simona	September 4, 1924	Williams Bay	G. Van Biesbroeck	EOS	19 km (12 mi)	MPC · JPL
1034 Mozartia	1924 SS	Mozartia	September 7, 1924	Crimea-Simeis	V. Albitskij	slow	7.9 km (4.9 mi)	MPC · JPL
1035 Amata	1924 SW	Amata	September 29, 1924	Heidelberg	K. Reinmuth	·	56 km (35 mi)	MPC · JPL
1036 Ganymed	1924 TD	Ganymed	October 23, 1924	Hamburg-Bergedorf	W. Baade	AMO +1 km (0.62 mi)	38 km (24 mi)	MPC · JPL
1037 Davidweilla	1924 TF	Davidweilla	October 29, 1924	Algiers	B. Jekhovsky	·	6.9 km (4.3 mi)	MPC · JPL
1038 Tuckia	1924 TK	Tuckia	November 24, 1924	Heidelberg	M. F. Wolf	T_{j} (2.99) · HIL · 3:2	58 km (36 mi)	MPC · JPL
1039 Sonneberga	1924 TL	Sonneberga	November 24, 1924	Heidelberg	M. F. Wolf	·	34 km (21 mi)	MPC · JPL
1040 Klumpkea	1925 BD	Klumpkea	January 20, 1925	Algiers	B. Jekhovsky	TIR	22 km (14 mi)	MPC · JPL
1041 Asta	1925 FA	Asta	March 22, 1925	Heidelberg	K. Reinmuth	·	61 km (38 mi)	MPC · JPL
1042 Amazone	1925 HA	Amazone	April 22, 1925	Heidelberg	K. Reinmuth	slow	64 km (40 mi)	MPC · JPL
1043 Beate	1925 HB	Beate	April 22, 1925	Heidelberg	K. Reinmuth	·	32 km (20 mi)	MPC · JPL
1044 Teutonia	1924 RO	Teutonia	May 10, 1924	Heidelberg	K. Reinmuth	·	18 km (11 mi)	MPC · JPL
1045 Michela	1924 TR	Michela	November 19, 1924	Williams Bay	G. Van Biesbroeck	·	6.1 km (3.8 mi)	MPC · JPL
1046 Edwin	1924 UA	Edwin	December 1, 1924	Williams Bay	G. Van Biesbroeck	·	29 km (18 mi)	MPC · JPL
1047 Geisha	1924 TE	Geisha	November 17, 1924	Heidelberg	K. Reinmuth	·	11 km (6.8 mi)	MPC · JPL
1048 Feodosia	1924 TP	Feodosia	November 29, 1924	Heidelberg	K. Reinmuth	·	62 km (39 mi)	MPC · JPL
1049 Gotho	1925 RB	Gotho	September 14, 1925	Heidelberg	K. Reinmuth	·	56 km (35 mi)	MPC · JPL
1050 Meta	1925 RC	Meta	September 14, 1925	Heidelberg	K. Reinmuth	EUN	8.8 km (5.5 mi)	MPC · JPL
1051 Merope	1925 SA	Merope	September 16, 1925	Heidelberg	K. Reinmuth	·	60 km (37 mi)	MPC · JPL
1052 Belgica	1925 VD	Belgica	November 15, 1925	Uccle	E. Delporte	moon	9.8 km (6.1 mi)	MPC · JPL
1053 Vigdis	1925 WA	Vigdis	November 16, 1925	Heidelberg	M. F. Wolf	·	9.1 km (5.7 mi)	MPC · JPL
1054 Forsytia	1925 WD	Forsytia	November 20, 1925	Heidelberg	K. Reinmuth	·	48 km (30 mi)	MPC · JPL
1055 Tynka	1925 WG	Tynka	November 17, 1925	Algiers	Buchar, E.	·	13 km (8.1 mi)	MPC · JPL
1056 Azalea	1924 QD	Azalea	January 31, 1924	Heidelberg	K. Reinmuth	·	12 km (7.5 mi)	MPC · JPL
1057 Wanda	1925 QB	Wanda	August 16, 1925	Crimea-Simeis	G. Shajn	·	45 km (28 mi)	MPC · JPL
1058 Grubba	1925 MA	Grubba	June 22, 1925	Crimea-Simeis	G. Shajn	(254)	11 km (6.8 mi)	MPC · JPL
1059 Mussorgskia	1925 OA	Mussorgskia	July 19, 1925	Crimea-Simeis	V. Albitskij	·	25 km (16 mi)	MPC · JPL
1060 Magnolia	1925 PA	Magnolia	August 13, 1925	Heidelberg	K. Reinmuth	·	6.8 km (4.2 mi)	MPC · JPL
1061 Paeonia	1925 TB	Paeonia	October 10, 1925	Heidelberg	K. Reinmuth	·	23 km (14 mi)	MPC · JPL
1062 Ljuba	1925 TD	Ljuba	October 11, 1925	Crimea-Simeis	S. Belyavsky	·	58 km (36 mi)	MPC · JPL
1063 Aquilegia	1925 XA	Aquilegia	December 6, 1925	Heidelberg	K. Reinmuth	·	11 km (6.8 mi)	MPC · JPL
1064 Aethusa	1926 PA	Aethusa	August 2, 1926	Heidelberg	K. Reinmuth	·	20 km (12 mi)	MPC · JPL
1065 Amundsenia	1926 PD	Amundsenia	August 4, 1926	Crimea-Simeis	S. Belyavsky	·	20 km (12 mi)	MPC · JPL
1066 Lobelia	1926 RA	Lobelia	September 1, 1926	Heidelberg	K. Reinmuth	·	6.0 km (3.7 mi)	MPC · JPL
1067 Lunaria	1926 RG	Lunaria	September 9, 1926	Heidelberg	K. Reinmuth	·	20 km (12 mi)	MPC · JPL
1068 Nofretete	1926 RK	Nofretete	September 13, 1926	Uccle	E. Delporte	·	21 km (13 mi)	MPC · JPL
1069 Planckia	1927 BC	Planckia	January 28, 1927	Heidelberg	M. F. Wolf	·	36 km (22 mi)	MPC · JPL
1070 Tunica	1926 RB	Tunica	September 1, 1926	Heidelberg	K. Reinmuth	URS	39 km (24 mi)	MPC · JPL
1071 Brita	1924 RE	Brita	March 3, 1924	Crimea-Simeis	V. Albitskij	·	61 km (38 mi)	MPC · JPL
1072 Malva	1926 TA	Malva	October 4, 1926	Heidelberg	K. Reinmuth	·	54 km (34 mi)	MPC · JPL
1073 Gellivara	1923 OW	Gellivara	September 14, 1923	Vienna	J. Palisa	THM	26 km (16 mi)	MPC · JPL
1074 Beljawskya	1925 BE	Beljawskya	January 26, 1925	Crimea-Simeis	S. Belyavsky	THM	49 km (30 mi)	MPC · JPL
1075 Helina	1926 SC	Helina	September 29, 1926	Crimea-Simeis	G. N. Neujmin	EOS	26 km (16 mi)	MPC · JPL
1076 Viola	1926 TE	Viola	October 5, 1926	Heidelberg	K. Reinmuth	·	22 km (14 mi)	MPC · JPL
1077 Campanula	1926 TK	Campanula	October 6, 1926	Heidelberg	K. Reinmuth	·	9.7 km (6.0 mi)	MPC · JPL
1078 Mentha	1926 XB	Mentha	December 7, 1926	Heidelberg	K. Reinmuth	·	13 km (8.1 mi)	MPC · JPL
1079 Mimosa	1927 AD	Mimosa	January 14, 1927	Williams Bay	G. Van Biesbroeck	KOR	21 km (13 mi)	MPC · JPL
1080 Orchis	1927 QB	Orchis	August 30, 1927	Heidelberg	K. Reinmuth	·	23 km (14 mi)	MPC · JPL
1081 Reseda	1927 QF	Reseda	August 31, 1927	Heidelberg	K. Reinmuth	·	38 km (24 mi)	MPC · JPL
1082 Pirola	1927 UC	Pirola	October 28, 1927	Heidelberg	K. Reinmuth	THM	43 km (27 mi)	MPC · JPL
1083 Salvia	1928 BC	Salvia	January 26, 1928	Heidelberg	K. Reinmuth	·	8.9 km (5.5 mi)	MPC · JPL
1084 Tamariwa	1926 CC	Tamariwa	February 12, 1926	Crimea-Simeis	S. Belyavsky	·	26 km (16 mi)	MPC · JPL
1085 Amaryllis	1927 QH	Amaryllis	August 31, 1927	Heidelberg	K. Reinmuth	·	69 km (43 mi)	MPC · JPL
1086 Nata	1927 QL	Nata	August 25, 1927	Crimea-Simeis	S. Belyavsky, Ivanov, N.	VER	66 km (41 mi)	MPC · JPL
1087 Arabis	1927 RD	Arabis	September 2, 1927	Heidelberg	K. Reinmuth	EOS	37 km (23 mi)	MPC · JPL
1088 Mitaka	1927 WA	Mitaka	November 17, 1927	Tokyo	O. Oikawa	·	15 km (9.3 mi)	MPC · JPL
1089 Tama	1927 WB	Tama	November 17, 1927	Tokyo	O. Oikawa	moon	13 km (8.1 mi)	MPC · JPL
1090 Sumida	1928 DG	Sumida	February 20, 1928	Tokyo	O. Oikawa	PHO	13 km (8.1 mi)	MPC · JPL
1091 Spiraea	1928 DT	Spiraea	February 26, 1928	Heidelberg	K. Reinmuth	CYB	35 km (22 mi)	MPC · JPL
1092 Lilium	1924 PN	Lilium	January 12, 1924	Heidelberg	K. Reinmuth	·	40 km (25 mi)	MPC · JPL
1093 Freda	1925 LA	Freda	June 15, 1925	Algiers	B. Jekhovsky	·	117 km (73 mi)	MPC · JPL
1094 Siberia	1926 CB	Siberia	February 12, 1926	Crimea-Simeis	S. Belyavsky	EUN ·	18 km (11 mi)	MPC · JPL
1095 Tulipa	1926 GS	Tulipa	April 14, 1926	Heidelberg	K. Reinmuth	EOS	28 km (17 mi)	MPC · JPL
1096 Reunerta	1928 OB	Reunerta	July 21, 1928	Johannesburg	H. E. Wood	·	42 km (26 mi)	MPC · JPL
1097 Vicia	1928 PC	Vicia	August 11, 1928	Heidelberg	K. Reinmuth	slow	23 km (14 mi)	MPC · JPL
1098 Hakone	1928 RJ	Hakone	September 5, 1928	Tokyo	O. Oikawa	·	27 km (17 mi)	MPC · JPL
1099 Figneria	1928 RQ	Figneria	September 13, 1928	Crimea-Simeis	G. N. Neujmin	·	23 km (14 mi)	MPC · JPL
1100 Arnica	1928 SD	Arnica	September 22, 1928	Heidelberg	K. Reinmuth	KOR	17 km (11 mi)	MPC · JPL

== 1101–1200 ==
back to top

Designation			Discovery			Properties		Ref
Permanent	Provisional	Named after	Date	Site	Discoverer(s)	Category	Diam.	Ref
1101 Clematis	1928 SJ	Clematis	September 22, 1928	Heidelberg	K. Reinmuth	(1101) ·	34 km (21 mi)	MPC · JPL
1102 Pepita	1928 VA	Pepita	November 5, 1928	Barcelona	J. Comas i Solà	·	37 km (23 mi)	MPC · JPL
1103 Sequoia	1928 VB	Sequoia	November 9, 1928	Hamburg-Bergedorf	W. Baade	H	6.7 km (4.2 mi)	MPC · JPL
1104 Syringa	1928 XA	Syringa	December 9, 1928	Heidelberg	K. Reinmuth	·	23 km (14 mi)	MPC · JPL
1105 Fragaria	1929 AB	Fragaria	January 1, 1929	Heidelberg	K. Reinmuth	EOS	38 km (24 mi)	MPC · JPL
1106 Cydonia	1929 CW	Cydonia	February 5, 1929	Heidelberg	K. Reinmuth	EUN	12 km (7.5 mi)	MPC · JPL
1107 Lictoria	1929 FB	Lictoria	March 30, 1929	Pino Torinese	L. Volta	HYG	79 km (49 mi)	MPC · JPL
1108 Demeter	1929 KA	Demeter	May 31, 1929	Heidelberg	K. Reinmuth	·	25 km (16 mi)	MPC · JPL
1109 Tata	1929 CU	Tata	February 5, 1929	Heidelberg	K. Reinmuth	HYG	62 km (39 mi)	MPC · JPL
1110 Jaroslawa	1928 PD	Jaroslawa	August 10, 1928	Crimea-Simeis	G. N. Neujmin	·	12 km (7.5 mi)	MPC · JPL
1111 Reinmuthia	1927 CO	Reinmuthia	February 11, 1927	Heidelberg	K. Reinmuth	·	30 km (19 mi)	MPC · JPL
1112 Polonia	1928 PE	Polonia	August 15, 1928	Crimea-Simeis	P. F. Shajn	EOS	40 km (25 mi)	MPC · JPL
1113 Katja	1928 QC	Katja	August 15, 1928	Crimea-Simeis	P. F. Shajn	·	45 km (28 mi)	MPC · JPL
1114 Lorraine	1928 WA	Lorraine	November 17, 1928	Nice	A. Schaumasse	EOS	76 km (47 mi)	MPC · JPL
1115 Sabauda	1928 XC	Sabauda	December 13, 1928	Pino Torinese	L. Volta	·	76 km (47 mi)	MPC · JPL
1116 Catriona	1929 GD	Catriona	April 5, 1929	Johannesburg	C. Jackson	·	39 km (24 mi)	MPC · JPL
1117 Reginita	1927 KA	Reginita	May 24, 1927	Barcelona	J. Comas i Solà	·	10 km (6.2 mi)	MPC · JPL
1118 Hanskya	1927 QD	Hanskya	August 29, 1927	Crimea-Simeis	S. Belyavsky, Ivanov, N.	(1118)	71 km (44 mi)	MPC · JPL
1119 Euboea	1927 UB	Euboea	October 27, 1927	Heidelberg	K. Reinmuth	·	29 km (18 mi)	MPC · JPL
1120 Cannonia	1928 RV	Cannonia	September 11, 1928	Crimea-Simeis	P. F. Shajn	·	10 km (6.2 mi)	MPC · JPL
1121 Natascha	1928 RZ	Natascha	September 11, 1928	Crimea-Simeis	P. F. Shajn	(5)	13 km (8.1 mi)	MPC · JPL
1122 Neith	1928 SB	Neith	September 17, 1928	Uccle	E. Delporte	·	12 km (7.5 mi)	MPC · JPL
1123 Shapleya	1928 ST	Shapleya	September 21, 1928	Crimea-Simeis	G. N. Neujmin	·	11 km (6.8 mi)	MPC · JPL
1124 Stroobantia	1928 TB	Stroobantia	October 6, 1928	Uccle	E. Delporte	·	24 km (15 mi)	MPC · JPL
1125 China	1957 UN_{1}	China	October 30, 1957	Nanking	Purple Mountain	·	26 km (16 mi)	MPC · JPL
1126 Otero	1929 AC	Otero	January 11, 1929	Heidelberg	K. Reinmuth	·	11 km (6.8 mi)	MPC · JPL
1127 Mimi	1929 AJ	Mimi	January 13, 1929	Uccle	S. J. Arend	·	46 km (29 mi)	MPC · JPL
1128 Astrid	1929 EB	Astrid	March 10, 1929	Uccle	E. Delporte	AST	42 km (26 mi)	MPC · JPL
1129 Neujmina	1929 PH	Neujmina	August 8, 1929	Crimea-Simeis	Parchomenko, P.	EOS	35 km (22 mi)	MPC · JPL
1130 Skuld	1929 RC	Skuld	September 2, 1929	Heidelberg	K. Reinmuth	·	10 km (6.2 mi)	MPC · JPL
1131 Porzia	1929 RO	Porzia	September 10, 1929	Heidelberg	K. Reinmuth	·	7.5 km (4.7 mi)	MPC · JPL
1132 Hollandia	1929 RB_{1}	Hollandia	September 13, 1929	Johannesburg	H. van Gent	·	27 km (17 mi)	MPC · JPL
1133 Lugduna	1929 RC_{1}	Lugduna	September 13, 1929	Johannesburg	H. van Gent	·	8.3 km (5.2 mi)	MPC · JPL
1134 Kepler	1929 SA	Kepler	September 25, 1929	Heidelberg	M. F. Wolf	·	6.0 km (3.7 mi)	MPC · JPL
1135 Colchis	1929 TA	Colchis	October 3, 1929	Crimea-Simeis	G. N. Neujmin	·	51 km (32 mi)	MPC · JPL
1136 Mercedes	1929 UA	Mercedes	October 30, 1929	Barcelona	J. Comas i Solà	·	25 km (16 mi)	MPC · JPL
1137 Raïssa	1929 WB	Raïssa	October 27, 1929	Crimea-Simeis	G. N. Neujmin	slow	19 km (12 mi)	MPC · JPL
1138 Attica	1929 WF	Attica	November 22, 1929	Heidelberg	K. Reinmuth	·	24 km (15 mi)	MPC · JPL
1139 Atami	1929 XE	Atami	December 1, 1929	Tokyo	O. Oikawa, K. Kubokawa	moon	7.9 km (4.9 mi)	MPC · JPL
1140 Crimea	1929 YC	Crimea	December 30, 1929	Crimea-Simeis	G. N. Neujmin	·	29 km (18 mi)	MPC · JPL
1141 Bohmia	1930 AA	Bohmia	January 4, 1930	Heidelberg	M. F. Wolf	·	5.6 km (3.5 mi)	MPC · JPL
1142 Aetolia	1930 BC	Aetolia	January 24, 1930	Heidelberg	K. Reinmuth	·	22 km (14 mi)	MPC · JPL
1143 Odysseus	1930 BH	Odysseus	January 28, 1930	Heidelberg	K. Reinmuth	L4	115 km (71 mi)	MPC · JPL
1144 Oda	1930 BJ	Oda	January 28, 1930	Heidelberg	K. Reinmuth	3:2 · slow	56 km (35 mi)	MPC · JPL
1145 Robelmonte	1929 CC	Robelmonte	February 3, 1929	Uccle	E. Delporte	V	24 km (15 mi)	MPC · JPL
1146 Biarmia	1929 JF	Biarmia	May 7, 1929	Crimea-Simeis	G. N. Neujmin	·	33 km (21 mi)	MPC · JPL
1147 Stavropolis	1929 LF	Stavropolis	June 11, 1929	Crimea-Simeis	G. N. Neujmin	·	13 km (8.1 mi)	MPC · JPL
1148 Rarahu	1929 NA	Rarahu	July 5, 1929	Crimea-Simeis	A. Deutsch	EOS	28 km (17 mi)	MPC · JPL
1149 Volga	1929 PF	Volga	August 1, 1929	Crimea-Simeis	Skvortsov, E.	·	52 km (32 mi)	MPC · JPL
1150 Achaia	1929 RB	Achaia	September 2, 1929	Heidelberg	K. Reinmuth	·	7.7 km (4.8 mi)	MPC · JPL
1151 Ithaka	1929 RK	Ithaka	September 8, 1929	Heidelberg	K. Reinmuth	·	12 km (7.5 mi)	MPC · JPL
1152 Pawona	1930 AD	Pawona	January 8, 1930	Heidelberg	K. Reinmuth	·	17 km (11 mi)	MPC · JPL
1153 Wallenbergia	1924 SL	Wallenbergia	September 5, 1924	Crimea-Simeis	S. Belyavsky	·	8.0 km (5.0 mi)	MPC · JPL
1154 Astronomia	1927 CB	Astronomia	February 8, 1927	Heidelberg	K. Reinmuth	CYB	56 km (35 mi)	MPC · JPL
1155 Aënna	1928 BD	Aënna	January 26, 1928	Heidelberg	K. Reinmuth	·	9.3 km (5.8 mi)	MPC · JPL
1156 Kira	1928 DA	Kira	February 22, 1928	Heidelberg	K. Reinmuth	·	6.8 km (4.2 mi)	MPC · JPL
1157 Arabia	1929 QC	Arabia	August 31, 1929	Heidelberg	K. Reinmuth	·	29 km (18 mi)	MPC · JPL
1158 Luda	1929 QF	Luda	August 31, 1929	Crimea-Simeis	G. N. Neujmin	MAR	19 km (12 mi)	MPC · JPL
1159 Granada	1929 RD	Granada	September 2, 1929	Heidelberg	K. Reinmuth	PHO	29 km (18 mi)	MPC · JPL
1160 Illyria	1929 RL	Illyria	September 9, 1929	Heidelberg	K. Reinmuth	MAR	14 km (8.7 mi)	MPC · JPL
1161 Thessalia	1929 SF	Thessalia	September 29, 1929	Heidelberg	K. Reinmuth	·	21 km (13 mi)	MPC · JPL
1162 Larissa	1930 AC	Larissa	January 5, 1930	Heidelberg	K. Reinmuth	3:2	40 km (25 mi)	MPC · JPL
1163 Saga	1930 BA	Saga	January 20, 1930	Heidelberg	K. Reinmuth	·	32 km (20 mi)	MPC · JPL
1164 Kobolda	1930 FB	Kobolda	March 19, 1930	Heidelberg	K. Reinmuth	PHO	7.7 km (4.8 mi)	MPC · JPL
1165 Imprinetta	1930 HM	Imprinetta	April 24, 1930	Johannesburg	H. van Gent	·	53 km (33 mi)	MPC · JPL
1166 Sakuntala	1930 MA	Sakuntala	June 27, 1930	Crimea-Simeis	Parchomenko, P.	·	26 km (16 mi)	MPC · JPL
1167 Dubiago	1930 PB	Dubiago	August 3, 1930	Crimea-Simeis	Skvortsov, E.	CYB	63 km (39 mi)	MPC · JPL
1168 Brandia	1930 QA	Brandia	August 25, 1930	Uccle	E. Delporte	EUN	10 km (6.2 mi)	MPC · JPL
1169 Alwine	1930 QH	Alwine	August 30, 1930	Heidelberg	M. F. Wolf, Ferrero, M.	·	8.1 km (5.0 mi)	MPC · JPL
1170 Siva	1930 SQ	Siva	September 29, 1930	Uccle	E. Delporte	·	10 km (6.2 mi)	MPC · JPL
1171 Rusthawelia	1930 TA	Rusthawelia	October 3, 1930	Uccle	S. J. Arend	·	82 km (51 mi)	MPC · JPL
1172 Äneas	1930 UA	Äneas	October 17, 1930	Heidelberg	K. Reinmuth	L5	118 km (73 mi)	MPC · JPL
1173 Anchises	1930 UB	Anchises	October 17, 1930	Heidelberg	K. Reinmuth	L5	100 km (62 mi)	MPC · JPL
1174 Marmara	1930 UC	Marmara	October 17, 1930	Heidelberg	K. Reinmuth	EOS	18 km (11 mi)	MPC · JPL
1175 Margo	1930 UD	Margo	October 17, 1930	Heidelberg	K. Reinmuth	·	24 km (15 mi)	MPC · JPL
1176 Lucidor	1930 VE	Lucidor	November 15, 1930	Uccle	E. Delporte	·	17 km (11 mi)	MPC · JPL
1177 Gonnessia	1930 WA	Gonnessia	November 24, 1930	Algiers	L. Boyer	CYB	92 km (57 mi)	MPC · JPL
1178 Irmela	1931 EC	Irmela	March 13, 1931	Heidelberg	M. F. Wolf	·	20 km (12 mi)	MPC · JPL
1179 Mally	1931 FD	Mally	March 19, 1931	Heidelberg	M. F. Wolf	·	13 km (8.1 mi)	MPC · JPL
1180 Rita	1931 GE	Rita	April 9, 1931	Heidelberg	K. Reinmuth	3:2	97 km (60 mi)	MPC · JPL
1181 Lilith	1927 CQ	Lilith	February 11, 1927	Algiers	B. Jekhovsky	·	20 km (12 mi)	MPC · JPL
1182 Ilona	1927 EA	Ilona	March 3, 1927	Heidelberg	K. Reinmuth	·	14 km (8.7 mi)	MPC · JPL
1183 Jutta	1930 DC	Jutta	February 22, 1930	Heidelberg	K. Reinmuth	NYS · slow ·	24 km (15 mi)	MPC · JPL
1184 Gaea	1926 RE	Gaea	September 5, 1926	Heidelberg	K. Reinmuth	·	12 km (7.5 mi)	MPC · JPL
1185 Nikko	1927 WC	Nikko	November 17, 1927	Tokyo	O. Oikawa	·	8.3 km (5.2 mi)	MPC · JPL
1186 Turnera	1929 PL	Turnera	August 1, 1929	Johannesburg	C. Jackson	EOS	34 km (21 mi)	MPC · JPL
1187 Afra	1929 XC	Afra	December 6, 1929	Heidelberg	K. Reinmuth	·	32 km (20 mi)	MPC · JPL
1188 Gothlandia	1930 SB	Gothlandia	September 30, 1930	Barcelona	J. Comas i Solà	·	13 km (8.1 mi)	MPC · JPL
1189 Terentia	1930 SG	Terentia	September 17, 1930	Crimea-Simeis	G. N. Neujmin	TRE	59 km (37 mi)	MPC · JPL
1190 Pelagia	1930 SL	Pelagia	September 20, 1930	Crimea-Simeis	G. N. Neujmin	·	18 km (11 mi)	MPC · JPL
1191 Alfaterna	1931 CA	Alfaterna	February 11, 1931	Pino Torinese	L. Volta	slow	47 km (29 mi)	MPC · JPL
1192 Prisma	1931 FE	Prisma	March 17, 1931	Hamburg-Bergedorf	A. Schwassmann	·	7.4 km (4.6 mi)	MPC · JPL
1193 Africa	1931 HB	Africa	April 24, 1931	Johannesburg	C. Jackson	EUN · slow	12 km (7.5 mi)	MPC · JPL
1194 Aletta	1931 JG	Aletta	May 13, 1931	Johannesburg	C. Jackson	·	41 km (25 mi)	MPC · JPL
1195 Orangia	1931 KD	Orangia	May 24, 1931	Johannesburg	C. Jackson	·	6.3 km (3.9 mi)	MPC · JPL
1196 Sheba	1931 KE	Sheba	May 21, 1931	Johannesburg	C. Jackson	·	25 km (16 mi)	MPC · JPL
1197 Rhodesia	1931 LD	Rhodesia	June 9, 1931	Johannesburg	C. Jackson	·	48 km (30 mi)	MPC · JPL
1198 Atlantis	1931 RA	Atlantis	September 7, 1931	Heidelberg	K. Reinmuth	·	3.9 km (2.4 mi)	MPC · JPL
1199 Geldonia	1931 RF	Geldonia	September 14, 1931	Uccle	E. Delporte	EOS	30 km (19 mi)	MPC · JPL
1200 Imperatrix	1931 RH	Imperatrix	September 14, 1931	Heidelberg	K. Reinmuth	·	42 km (26 mi)	MPC · JPL

== 1201–1300 ==
back to top

Designation			Discovery			Properties		Ref
Permanent	Provisional	Named after	Date	Site	Discoverer(s)	Category	Diam.	Ref
1201 Strenua	1931 RK	Strenua	September 14, 1931	Heidelberg	K. Reinmuth	·	36 km (22 mi)	MPC · JPL
1202 Marina	1931 RL	Marina	September 13, 1931	Crimea-Simeis	G. N. Neujmin	3:2	55 km (34 mi)	MPC · JPL
1203 Nanna	1931 TA	Nanna	October 5, 1931	Heidelberg	M. F. Wolf	·	35 km (22 mi)	MPC · JPL
1204 Renzia	1931 TE	Renzia	October 6, 1931	Heidelberg	K. Reinmuth	·	10 km (6.2 mi)	MPC · JPL
1205 Ebella	1931 TB_{1}	Ebella	October 6, 1931	Heidelberg	K. Reinmuth	·	5.5 km (3.4 mi)	MPC · JPL
1206 Numerowia	1931 UH	Numerowia	October 18, 1931	Heidelberg	K. Reinmuth	·	15 km (9.3 mi)	MPC · JPL
1207 Ostenia	1931 VT	Ostenia	November 15, 1931	Heidelberg	K. Reinmuth	EOS	22 km (14 mi)	MPC · JPL
1208 Troilus	1931 YA	Troilus	December 31, 1931	Heidelberg	K. Reinmuth	L5	100 km (62 mi)	MPC · JPL
1209 Pumma	1927 HA	Pumma	April 22, 1927	Heidelberg	K. Reinmuth	HYG ·	27 km (17 mi)	MPC · JPL
1210 Morosovia	1931 LB	Morosovia	June 6, 1931	Crimea-Simeis	G. N. Neujmin	EOS	34 km (21 mi)	MPC · JPL
1211 Bressole	1931 XA	Bressole	December 2, 1931	Algiers	L. Boyer	·	46 km (29 mi)	MPC · JPL
1212 Francette	1931 XC	Francette	December 3, 1931	Algiers	L. Boyer	HIL · 3:2	76 km (47 mi)	MPC · JPL
1213 Algeria	1931 XD	Algeria	December 5, 1931	Algiers	G. Reiss	·	29 km (18 mi)	MPC · JPL
1214 Richilde	1932 AA	Richilde	January 1, 1932	Heidelberg	M. F. Wolf	·	37 km (23 mi)	MPC · JPL
1215 Boyer	1932 BA	Boyer	January 19, 1932	Algiers	A. Schmitt	MAR	13 km (8.1 mi)	MPC · JPL
1216 Askania	1932 BL	Askania	January 29, 1932	Heidelberg	K. Reinmuth	·	11 km (6.8 mi)	MPC · JPL
1217 Maximiliana	1932 EC	Maximiliana	March 13, 1932	Uccle	E. Delporte	·	10 km (6.2 mi)	MPC · JPL
1218 Aster	1932 BJ	Aster	January 29, 1932	Heidelberg	K. Reinmuth	·	5.6 km (3.5 mi)	MPC · JPL
1219 Britta	1932 CJ	Britta	February 6, 1932	Heidelberg	M. F. Wolf	·	9.9 km (6.2 mi)	MPC · JPL
1220 Crocus	1932 CU	Crocus	February 11, 1932	Heidelberg	K. Reinmuth	EOS · slow	18 km (11 mi)	MPC · JPL
1221 Amor	1932 EA_{1}	Amor	March 12, 1932	Uccle	E. Delporte	AMO +1 km (0.62 mi)	1.0 km (0.62 mi)	MPC · JPL
1222 Tina	1932 LA	Tina	June 11, 1932	Uccle	E. Delporte	TIN	26 km (16 mi)	MPC · JPL
1223 Neckar	1931 TG	Neckar	October 6, 1931	Heidelberg	K. Reinmuth	KOR	23 km (14 mi)	MPC · JPL
1224 Fantasia	1927 SD	Fantasia	August 29, 1927	Crimea-Simeis	S. Belyavsky, Ivanov, N.	·	14 km (8.7 mi)	MPC · JPL
1225 Ariane	1930 HK	Ariane	April 23, 1930	Johannesburg	H. van Gent	·	9.2 km (5.7 mi)	MPC · JPL
1226 Golia	1930 HL	Golia	April 22, 1930	Johannesburg	H. van Gent	·	12 km (7.5 mi)	MPC · JPL
1227 Geranium	1931 TD	Geranium	October 5, 1931	Heidelberg	K. Reinmuth	·	46 km (29 mi)	MPC · JPL
1228 Scabiosa	1931 TU	Scabiosa	October 5, 1931	Heidelberg	K. Reinmuth	AGN	15 km (9.3 mi)	MPC · JPL
1229 Tilia	1931 TP_{1}	Tilia	October 9, 1931	Heidelberg	K. Reinmuth	THM	28 km (17 mi)	MPC · JPL
1230 Riceia	1931 TX_{1}	Riceia	October 9, 1931	Heidelberg	K. Reinmuth	·	6.2 km (3.9 mi)	MPC · JPL
1231 Auricula	1931 TE_{2}	Auricula	October 10, 1931	Heidelberg	K. Reinmuth	·	19 km (12 mi)	MPC · JPL
1232 Cortusa	1931 TF_{2}	Cortusa	October 10, 1931	Heidelberg	K. Reinmuth	·	36 km (22 mi)	MPC · JPL
1233 Kobresia	1931 TG_{2}	Kobresia	October 10, 1931	Heidelberg	K. Reinmuth	·	33 km (21 mi)	MPC · JPL
1234 Elyna	1931 UF	Elyna	October 18, 1931	Heidelberg	K. Reinmuth	EOS ·	23 km (14 mi)	MPC · JPL
1235 Schorria	1931 UJ	Schorria	October 18, 1931	Heidelberg	K. Reinmuth	H · slow	5.0 km (3.1 mi)	MPC · JPL
1236 Thaïs	1931 VX	Thaïs	November 6, 1931	Crimea-Simeis	G. N. Neujmin	PHO	22 km (14 mi)	MPC · JPL
1237 Geneviève	1931 XB	Geneviève	December 2, 1931	Algiers	G. Reiss	·	40 km (25 mi)	MPC · JPL
1238 Predappia	1932 CA	Predappia	February 4, 1932	Pino Torinese	L. Volta	ADE	21 km (13 mi)	MPC · JPL
1239 Queteleta	1932 CB	Queteleta	February 4, 1932	Uccle	E. Delporte	·	19 km (12 mi)	MPC · JPL
1240 Centenaria	1932 CD	Centenaria	February 5, 1932	Hamburg-Bergedorf	R. Schorr	·	63 km (39 mi)	MPC · JPL
1241 Dysona	1932 EB_{1}	Dysona	March 4, 1932	Johannesburg	H. E. Wood	·	79 km (49 mi)	MPC · JPL
1242 Zambesia	1932 HL	Zambesia	April 28, 1932	Johannesburg	C. Jackson	·	48 km (30 mi)	MPC · JPL
1243 Pamela	1932 JE	Pamela	May 7, 1932	Johannesburg	C. Jackson	·	70 km (43 mi)	MPC · JPL
1244 Deira	1932 KE	Deira	May 25, 1932	Johannesburg	C. Jackson	slow	32 km (20 mi)	MPC · JPL
1245 Calvinia	1932 KF	Calvinia	May 26, 1932	Johannesburg	C. Jackson	KOR	30 km (19 mi)	MPC · JPL
1246 Chaka	1932 OA	Chaka	July 23, 1932	Johannesburg	C. Jackson	·	18 km (11 mi)	MPC · JPL
1247 Memoria	1932 QA	Memoria	August 30, 1932	Uccle	M. Laugier	THM	39 km (24 mi)	MPC · JPL
1248 Jugurtha	1932 RO	Jugurtha	September 1, 1932	Johannesburg	C. Jackson	·	28 km (17 mi)	MPC · JPL
1249 Rutherfordia	1932 VB	Rutherfordia	November 4, 1932	Heidelberg	K. Reinmuth	·	13 km (8.1 mi)	MPC · JPL
1250 Galanthus	1933 BD	Galanthus	January 25, 1933	Heidelberg	K. Reinmuth	·	20 km (12 mi)	MPC · JPL
1251 Hedera	1933 BE	Hedera	January 25, 1933	Heidelberg	K. Reinmuth	·	13 km (8.1 mi)	MPC · JPL
1252 Celestia	1933 DG	Celestia	February 19, 1933	Oak Ridge Observatory	F. L. Whipple	·	19 km (12 mi)	MPC · JPL
1253 Frisia	1931 TV_{1}	Frisia	October 9, 1931	Heidelberg	K. Reinmuth	THM	22 km (14 mi)	MPC · JPL
1254 Erfordia	1932 JA	Erfordia	May 10, 1932	La Plata Observatory	J. Hartmann	·	52 km (32 mi)	MPC · JPL
1255 Schilowa	1932 NC	Schilowa	July 8, 1932	Crimea-Simeis	G. N. Neujmin	·	34 km (21 mi)	MPC · JPL
1256 Normannia	1932 PD	Normannia	August 8, 1932	Heidelberg	K. Reinmuth	3:2	68 km (42 mi)	MPC · JPL
1257 Móra	1932 PE	Móra	August 8, 1932	Heidelberg	K. Reinmuth	·	21 km (13 mi)	MPC · JPL
1258 Sicilia	1932 PG	Sicilia	August 8, 1932	Heidelberg	K. Reinmuth	·	46 km (29 mi)	MPC · JPL
1259 Ógyalla	1933 BT	Ógyalla	January 29, 1933	Heidelberg	K. Reinmuth	THM	36 km (22 mi)	MPC · JPL
1260 Walhalla	1933 BW	Walhalla	January 29, 1933	Heidelberg	K. Reinmuth	·	13 km (8.1 mi)	MPC · JPL
1261 Legia	1933 FB	Legia	March 23, 1933	Uccle	E. Delporte	·	33 km (21 mi)	MPC · JPL
1262 Sniadeckia	1933 FE	Sniadeckia	March 23, 1933	Uccle	S. J. Arend	·	71 km (44 mi)	MPC · JPL
1263 Varsavia	1933 FF	Varsavia	March 23, 1933	Uccle	S. J. Arend	·	49 km (30 mi)	MPC · JPL
1264 Letaba	1933 HG	Letaba	April 21, 1933	Johannesburg	C. Jackson	·	66 km (41 mi)	MPC · JPL
1265 Schweikarda	1911 MV	Schweikarda	October 18, 1911	Heidelberg	F. Kaiser	EOS	19 km (12 mi)	MPC · JPL
1266 Tone	1927 BD	Tone	January 23, 1927	Tokyo	O. Oikawa	CYB	75 km (47 mi)	MPC · JPL
1267 Geertruida	1930 HD	Geertruida	April 23, 1930	Johannesburg	H. van Gent	·	23 km (14 mi)	MPC · JPL
1268 Libya	1930 HJ	Libya	April 29, 1930	Johannesburg	C. Jackson	3:2	97 km (60 mi)	MPC · JPL
1269 Rollandia	1930 SH	Rollandia	September 20, 1930	Crimea-Simeis	G. N. Neujmin	3:2	105 km (65 mi)	MPC · JPL
1270 Datura	1930 YE	Datura	December 17, 1930	Williams Bay	G. Van Biesbroeck	·	8.2 km (5.1 mi)	MPC · JPL
1271 Isergina	1931 TN	Isergina	October 10, 1931	Crimea-Simeis	G. N. Neujmin	·	48 km (30 mi)	MPC · JPL
1272 Gefion	1931 TZ_{1}	Gefion	October 10, 1931	Heidelberg	K. Reinmuth	GEF	7.0 km (4.3 mi)	MPC · JPL
1273 Helma	1932 PF	Helma	August 8, 1932	Heidelberg	K. Reinmuth	V	6.3 km (3.9 mi)	MPC · JPL
1274 Delportia	1932 WC	Delportia	November 28, 1932	Uccle	E. Delporte	·	9.6 km (6.0 mi)	MPC · JPL
1275 Cimbria	1932 WG	Cimbria	November 30, 1932	Heidelberg	K. Reinmuth	EUN ·	28 km (17 mi)	MPC · JPL
1276 Ucclia	1933 BA	Ucclia	January 24, 1933	Uccle	E. Delporte	·	36 km (22 mi)	MPC · JPL
1277 Dolores	1933 HA	Dolores	April 18, 1933	Crimea-Simeis	G. N. Neujmin	·	33 km (21 mi)	MPC · JPL
1278 Kenya	1933 LA	Kenya	June 15, 1933	Johannesburg	C. Jackson	slow	19 km (12 mi)	MPC · JPL
1279 Uganda	1933 LB	Uganda	June 15, 1933	Johannesburg	C. Jackson	·	6.8 km (4.2 mi)	MPC · JPL
1280 Baillauda	1933 QB	Baillauda	August 18, 1933	Uccle	E. Delporte	CYB	51 km (32 mi)	MPC · JPL
1281 Jeanne	1933 QJ	Jeanne	August 25, 1933	Uccle	S. J. Arend	·	26 km (16 mi)	MPC · JPL
1282 Utopia	1933 QM_{1}	Utopia	August 17, 1933	Johannesburg	C. Jackson	·	58 km (36 mi)	MPC · JPL
1283 Komsomolia	1925 SC	Komsomolia	September 25, 1925	Crimea-Simeis	V. Albitskij	·	30 km (19 mi)	MPC · JPL
1284 Latvia	1933 OP	Latvia	July 27, 1933	Heidelberg	K. Reinmuth	·	41 km (25 mi)	MPC · JPL
1285 Julietta	1933 QF	Julietta	August 21, 1933	Uccle	E. Delporte	·	42 km (26 mi)	MPC · JPL
1286 Banachiewicza	1933 QH	Banachiewicza	August 25, 1933	Uccle	S. J. Arend	EOS	21 km (13 mi)	MPC · JPL
1287 Lorcia	1933 QL	Lorcia	August 25, 1933	Uccle	S. J. Arend	EOS	22 km (14 mi)	MPC · JPL
1288 Santa	1933 QM	Santa	August 26, 1933	Uccle	E. Delporte	·	31 km (19 mi)	MPC · JPL
1289 Kutaïssi	1933 QR	Kutaïssi	August 19, 1933	Crimea-Simeis	G. N. Neujmin	KOR	22 km (14 mi)	MPC · JPL
1290 Albertine	1933 QL_{1}	Albertine	August 21, 1933	Uccle	E. Delporte	·	9.7 km (6.0 mi)	MPC · JPL
1291 Phryne	1933 RA	Phryne	September 15, 1933	Uccle	E. Delporte	EOS	27 km (17 mi)	MPC · JPL
1292 Luce	1933 SH	Luce	September 17, 1933	Uccle	F. Rigaux	·	14 km (8.7 mi)	MPC · JPL
1293 Sonja	1933 SO	Sonja	September 26, 1933	Uccle	E. Delporte	·	7.8 km (4.8 mi)	MPC · JPL
1294 Antwerpia	1933 UB_{1}	Antwerpia	October 24, 1933	Uccle	E. Delporte	·	37 km (23 mi)	MPC · JPL
1295 Deflotte	1933 WD	Deflotte	November 25, 1933	Algiers	L. Boyer	CYB	47 km (29 mi)	MPC · JPL
1296 Andrée	1933 WE	Andrée	November 25, 1933	Algiers	L. Boyer	·	26 km (16 mi)	MPC · JPL
1297 Quadea	1934 AD	Quadea	January 7, 1934	Heidelberg	K. Reinmuth	EOS	22 km (14 mi)	MPC · JPL
1298 Nocturna	1934 AE	Nocturna	January 7, 1934	Heidelberg	K. Reinmuth	(1298)	38 km (24 mi)	MPC · JPL
1299 Mertona	1934 BA	Mertona	January 18, 1934	Algiers	G. Reiss	·	14 km (8.7 mi)	MPC · JPL
1300 Marcelle	1934 CL	Marcelle	February 10, 1934	Algiers	G. Reiss	slow	28 km (17 mi)	MPC · JPL

== 1301–1400 ==
back to top

Designation			Discovery			Properties		Ref
Permanent	Provisional	Named after	Date	Site	Discoverer(s)	Category	Diam.	Ref
1301 Yvonne	1934 EA	Yvonne	March 7, 1934	Algiers	L. Boyer	·	21 km (13 mi)	MPC · JPL
1302 Werra	1924 SV	Werra	September 28, 1924	Heidelberg	K. Reinmuth	THM	35 km (22 mi)	MPC · JPL
1303 Luthera	1928 FP	Luthera	March 16, 1928	Hamburg-Bergedorf	A. Schwassmann	LUT	82 km (51 mi)	MPC · JPL
1304 Arosa	1928 KC	Arosa	May 21, 1928	Heidelberg	K. Reinmuth	·	44 km (27 mi)	MPC · JPL
1305 Pongola	1928 OC	Pongola	July 19, 1928	Johannesburg	H. E. Wood	·	24 km (15 mi)	MPC · JPL
1306 Scythia	1930 OB	Scythia	July 22, 1930	Crimea-Simeis	G. N. Neujmin	URS ·	67 km (42 mi)	MPC · JPL
1307 Cimmeria	1930 UF	Cimmeria	October 17, 1930	Crimea-Simeis	G. N. Neujmin	·	9.4 km (5.8 mi)	MPC · JPL
1308 Halleria	1931 EB	Halleria	March 12, 1931	Heidelberg	K. Reinmuth	·	47 km (29 mi)	MPC · JPL
1309 Hyperborea	1931 TO	Hyperborea	October 11, 1931	Crimea-Simeis	G. N. Neujmin	·	58 km (36 mi)	MPC · JPL
1310 Villigera	1932 DB	Villigera	February 28, 1932	Hamburg-Bergedorf	A. Schwassmann	·	20 km (12 mi)	MPC · JPL
1311 Knopfia	1933 FF_{1}	Knopfia	March 24, 1933	Heidelberg	K. Reinmuth	·	9.9 km (6.2 mi)	MPC · JPL
1312 Vassar	1933 OT	Vassar	July 27, 1933	Williams Bay	G. Van Biesbroeck	·	36 km (22 mi)	MPC · JPL
1313 Berna	1933 QG	Berna	August 24, 1933	Uccle	S. J. Arend	moon	14 km (8.7 mi)	MPC · JPL
1314 Paula	1933 SC	Paula	September 16, 1933	Uccle	S. J. Arend	·	8.2 km (5.1 mi)	MPC · JPL
1315 Bronislawa	1933 SF_{1}	Bronislawa	September 16, 1933	Uccle	S. J. Arend	·	65 km (40 mi)	MPC · JPL
1316 Kasan	1933 WC	Kasan	November 17, 1933	Crimea-Simeis	G. N. Neujmin	·	10 km (6.2 mi)	MPC · JPL
1317 Silvretta	1935 RC	Silvretta	September 1, 1935	Heidelberg	K. Reinmuth	·	18 km (11 mi)	MPC · JPL
1318 Nerina	1934 FG	Nerina	March 24, 1934	Johannesburg	C. Jackson	PHO	13 km (8.1 mi)	MPC · JPL
1319 Disa	1934 FO	Disa	March 19, 1934	Johannesburg	C. Jackson	·	26 km (16 mi)	MPC · JPL
1320 Impala	1934 JG	Impala	May 13, 1934	Johannesburg	C. Jackson	·	37 km (23 mi)	MPC · JPL
1321 Majuba	1934 JH	Majuba	May 7, 1934	Johannesburg	C. Jackson	·	37 km (23 mi)	MPC · JPL
1322 Coppernicus	1934 LA	Coppernicus	June 15, 1934	Heidelberg	K. Reinmuth	PHO	10 km (6.2 mi)	MPC · JPL
1323 Tugela	1934 LD	Tugela	May 19, 1934	Johannesburg	C. Jackson	·	78 km (48 mi)	MPC · JPL
1324 Knysna	1934 LL	Knysna	June 15, 1934	Johannesburg	C. Jackson	·	6.5 km (4.0 mi)	MPC · JPL
1325 Inanda	1934 NR	Inanda	July 14, 1934	Johannesburg	C. Jackson	·	11 km (6.8 mi)	MPC · JPL
1326 Losaka	1934 NS	Losaka	July 14, 1934	Johannesburg	C. Jackson	·	26 km (16 mi)	MPC · JPL
1327 Namaqua	1934 RT	Namaqua	September 7, 1934	Johannesburg	C. Jackson	MRX ·	22 km (14 mi)	MPC · JPL
1328 Devota	1925 UA	Devota	October 21, 1925	Algiers	B. Jekhovsky	CYB	54 km (34 mi)	MPC · JPL
1329 Eliane	1933 FL	Eliane	March 23, 1933	Uccle	E. Delporte	EUN · slow	19 km (12 mi)	MPC · JPL
1330 Spiridonia	1925 DB	Spiridonia	February 17, 1925	Crimea-Simeis	V. Albitskij	·	68 km (42 mi)	MPC · JPL
1331 Solvejg	1933 QS	Solvejg	August 25, 1933	Crimea-Simeis	G. N. Neujmin	·	37 km (23 mi)	MPC · JPL
1332 Marconia	1934 AA	Marconia	January 9, 1934	Pino Torinese	L. Volta	·	47 km (29 mi)	MPC · JPL
1333 Cevenola	1934 DA	Cevenola	February 20, 1934	Algiers	O. Bancilhon	EUN	15 km (9.3 mi)	MPC · JPL
1334 Lundmarka	1934 OB	Lundmarka	July 16, 1934	Heidelberg	K. Reinmuth	·	28 km (17 mi)	MPC · JPL
1335 Demoulina	1934 RE	Demoulina	September 7, 1934	Heidelberg	K. Reinmuth	·	7.5 km (4.7 mi)	MPC · JPL
1336 Zeelandia	1934 RW	Zeelandia	September 9, 1934	Johannesburg	H. van Gent	KOR	21 km (13 mi)	MPC · JPL
1337 Gerarda	1934 RA_{1}	Gerarda	September 9, 1934	Johannesburg	H. van Gent	·	41 km (25 mi)	MPC · JPL
1338 Duponta	1934 XA	Duponta	December 4, 1934	Algiers	L. Boyer	(1338) (FLO) · moon	7.5 km (4.7 mi)	MPC · JPL
1339 Désagneauxa	1934 XB	Désagneauxa	December 4, 1934	Algiers	L. Boyer	EOS	24 km (15 mi)	MPC · JPL
1340 Yvette	1934 YA	Yvette	December 27, 1934	Algiers	L. Boyer	THM	29 km (18 mi)	MPC · JPL
1341 Edmée	1935 BA	Edmée	January 27, 1935	Uccle	E. Delporte	·	24 km (15 mi)	MPC · JPL
1342 Brabantia	1935 CV	Brabantia	February 13, 1935	Johannesburg	H. van Gent	PHO	12 km (7.5 mi)	MPC · JPL
1343 Nicole	1935 FC	Nicole	March 29, 1935	Algiers	L. Boyer	·	24 km (15 mi)	MPC · JPL
1344 Caubeta	1935 GA	Caubeta	April 1, 1935	Algiers	L. Boyer	·	5.8 km (3.6 mi)	MPC · JPL
1345 Potomac	1908 CG	Potomac	February 4, 1908	Taunton	J. H. Metcalf	T_{j} (2.99) · 3:2	73 km (45 mi)	MPC · JPL
1346 Gotha	1929 CY	Gotha	February 5, 1929	Heidelberg	K. Reinmuth	EUN	14 km (8.7 mi)	MPC · JPL
1347 Patria	1931 VW	Patria	November 6, 1931	Crimea-Simeis	G. N. Neujmin	·	32 km (20 mi)	MPC · JPL
1348 Michel	1933 FD	Michel	March 23, 1933	Uccle	S. J. Arend	·	16 km (9.9 mi)	MPC · JPL
1349 Bechuana	1934 LJ	Bechuana	June 13, 1934	Johannesburg	C. Jackson	·	24 km (15 mi)	MPC · JPL
1350 Rosselia	1934 TA	Rosselia	October 3, 1934	Uccle	E. Delporte	KOR	21 km (13 mi)	MPC · JPL
1351 Uzbekistania	1934 TF	Uzbekistania	October 5, 1934	Crimea-Simeis	G. N. Neujmin	·	60 km (37 mi)	MPC · JPL
1352 Wawel	1935 CE	Wawel	February 3, 1935	Uccle	S. J. Arend	·	20 km (12 mi)	MPC · JPL
1353 Maartje	1935 CU	Maartje	February 13, 1935	Johannesburg	H. van Gent	EOS ·	39 km (24 mi)	MPC · JPL
1354 Botha	1935 GK	Botha	April 3, 1935	Johannesburg	C. Jackson	·	42 km (26 mi)	MPC · JPL
1355 Magoeba	1935 HE	Magoeba	April 30, 1935	Johannesburg	C. Jackson	H	4.3 km (2.7 mi)	MPC · JPL
1356 Nyanza	1935 JH	Nyanza	May 3, 1935	Johannesburg	C. Jackson	·	61 km (38 mi)	MPC · JPL
1357 Khama	1935 ND	Khama	July 2, 1935	Johannesburg	C. Jackson	·	38 km (24 mi)	MPC · JPL
1358 Gaika	1935 OB	Gaika	July 21, 1935	Johannesburg	C. Jackson	·	22 km (14 mi)	MPC · JPL
1359 Prieska	1935 OC	Prieska	July 22, 1935	Johannesburg	C. Jackson	·	46 km (29 mi)	MPC · JPL
1360 Tarka	1935 OD	Tarka	July 22, 1935	Johannesburg	C. Jackson	·	33 km (21 mi)	MPC · JPL
1361 Leuschneria	1935 QA	Leuschneria	August 30, 1935	Uccle	E. Delporte	·	30 km (19 mi)	MPC · JPL
1362 Griqua	1935 QG_{1}	Griqua	July 31, 1935	Johannesburg	C. Jackson	T_{j} (2.95) · 2:1J	27 km (17 mi)	MPC · JPL
1363 Herberta	1935 RA	Herberta	August 30, 1935	Uccle	E. Delporte	KOR	14 km (8.7 mi)	MPC · JPL
1364 Safara	1935 VB	Safara	November 18, 1935	Algiers	L. Boyer	EOS	21 km (13 mi)	MPC · JPL
1365 Henyey	1928 RK	Henyey	September 9, 1928	Heidelberg	M. F. Wolf	(883)	11 km (6.8 mi)	MPC · JPL
1366 Piccolo	1932 WA	Piccolo	November 29, 1932	Uccle	E. Delporte	·	28 km (17 mi)	MPC · JPL
1367 Nongoma	1934 NA	Nongoma	July 3, 1934	Johannesburg	C. Jackson	PHO	9.4 km (5.8 mi)	MPC · JPL
1368 Numidia	1935 HD	Numidia	April 30, 1935	Johannesburg	C. Jackson	MAR	20 km (12 mi)	MPC · JPL
1369 Ostanina	1935 QB	Ostanina	August 27, 1935	Crimea-Simeis	P. F. Shajn	·	42 km (26 mi)	MPC · JPL
1370 Hella	1935 QG	Hella	August 31, 1935	Heidelberg	K. Reinmuth	fast	5.5 km (3.4 mi)	MPC · JPL
1371 Resi	1935 QJ	Resi	August 31, 1935	Heidelberg	K. Reinmuth	·	27 km (17 mi)	MPC · JPL
1372 Haremari	1935 QK	Haremari	August 31, 1935	Heidelberg	K. Reinmuth	WAT ·	26 km (16 mi)	MPC · JPL
1373 Cincinnati	1935 QN	Cincinnati	August 30, 1935	Mount Wilson	E. Hubble	T_{j} (2.72) · CYB	19 km (12 mi)	MPC · JPL
1374 Isora	1935 UA	Isora	October 21, 1935	Uccle	E. Delporte	·	6.5 km (4.0 mi)	MPC · JPL
1375 Alfreda	1935 UB	Alfreda	October 22, 1935	Uccle	E. Delporte	·	14 km (8.7 mi)	MPC · JPL
1376 Michelle	1935 UH	Michelle	October 29, 1935	Algiers	G. Reiss	·	7.1 km (4.4 mi)	MPC · JPL
1377 Roberbauxa	1936 CD	Roberbauxa	February 14, 1936	Algiers	L. Boyer	·	6.2 km (3.9 mi)	MPC · JPL
1378 Leonce	1936 DB	Leonce	February 21, 1936	Uccle	F. Rigaux	·	21 km (13 mi)	MPC · JPL
1379 Lomonosowa	1936 FC	Lomonosowa	March 19, 1936	Crimea-Simeis	G. N. Neujmin	·	19 km (12 mi)	MPC · JPL
1380 Volodia	1936 FM	Volodia	March 16, 1936	Algiers	L. Boyer	·	21 km (13 mi)	MPC · JPL
1381 Danubia	1930 QJ	Danubia	August 20, 1930	Crimea-Simeis	Skvortsov, E.	·	20 km (12 mi)	MPC · JPL
1382 Gerti	1925 BB	Gerti	January 21, 1925	Heidelberg	K. Reinmuth	·	12 km (7.5 mi)	MPC · JPL
1383 Limburgia	1934 RV	Limburgia	September 9, 1934	Johannesburg	H. van Gent	THM	23 km (14 mi)	MPC · JPL
1384 Kniertje	1934 RX	Kniertje	September 9, 1934	Johannesburg	H. van Gent	ADE	27 km (17 mi)	MPC · JPL
1385 Gelria	1935 MJ	Gelria	May 24, 1935	Johannesburg	H. van Gent	·	20 km (12 mi)	MPC · JPL
1386 Storeria	1935 PA	Storeria	July 28, 1935	Crimea-Simeis	G. N. Neujmin	·	11 km (6.8 mi)	MPC · JPL
1387 Kama	1935 QD	Kama	August 27, 1935	Crimea-Simeis	P. F. Shajn	·	7.5 km (4.7 mi)	MPC · JPL
1388 Aphrodite	1935 SS	Aphrodite	September 24, 1935	Uccle	E. Delporte	EOS	21 km (13 mi)	MPC · JPL
1389 Onnie	1935 SS_{1}	Onnie	September 28, 1935	Johannesburg	H. van Gent	KOR	14 km (8.7 mi)	MPC · JPL
1390 Abastumani	1935 TA	Abastumani	October 3, 1935	Crimea-Simeis	P. F. Shajn	CYB	96 km (60 mi)	MPC · JPL
1391 Carelia	1936 DA	Carelia	February 16, 1936	Turku	Y. Väisälä	·	11 km (6.8 mi)	MPC · JPL
1392 Pierre	1936 FO	Pierre	March 16, 1936	Algiers	L. Boyer	·	26 km (16 mi)	MPC · JPL
1393 Sofala	1936 KD	Sofala	May 25, 1936	Johannesburg	C. Jackson	slow	11 km (6.8 mi)	MPC · JPL
1394 Algoa	1936 LK	Algoa	June 12, 1936	Johannesburg	C. Jackson	·	20 km (12 mi)	MPC · JPL
1395 Aribeda	1936 OB	Aribeda	July 16, 1936	Heidelberg	K. Reinmuth	·	20 km (12 mi)	MPC · JPL
1396 Outeniqua	1936 PF	Outeniqua	August 9, 1936	Johannesburg	C. Jackson	·	12 km (7.5 mi)	MPC · JPL
1397 Umtata	1936 PG	Umtata	August 9, 1936	Johannesburg	C. Jackson	·	21 km (13 mi)	MPC · JPL
1398 Donnera	1936 QL	Donnera	August 26, 1936	Turku	Y. Väisälä	·	25 km (16 mi)	MPC · JPL
1399 Teneriffa	1936 QY	Teneriffa	August 23, 1936	Heidelberg	K. Reinmuth	·	4.9 km (3.0 mi)	MPC · JPL
1400 Tirela	1936 WA	Tirela	November 17, 1936	Algiers	L. Boyer	TIR ·	16 km (9.9 mi)	MPC · JPL

== 1401–1500 ==
back to top

Designation			Discovery			Properties		Ref
Permanent	Provisional	Named after	Date	Site	Discoverer(s)	Category	Diam.	Ref
1401 Lavonne	1935 UD	Lavonne	October 22, 1935	Uccle	E. Delporte	·	9.3 km (5.8 mi)	MPC · JPL
1402 Eri	1936 OC	Eri	July 16, 1936	Heidelberg	K. Reinmuth	·	14 km (8.7 mi)	MPC · JPL
1403 Idelsonia	1936 QA	Idelsonia	August 13, 1936	Crimea-Simeis	G. N. Neujmin	CLO ·	27 km (17 mi)	MPC · JPL
1404 Ajax	1936 QW	Ajax	August 17, 1936	Heidelberg	K. Reinmuth	L4	84 km (52 mi)	MPC · JPL
1405 Sibelius	1936 RE	Sibelius	September 12, 1936	Turku	Y. Väisälä	·	6.8 km (4.2 mi)	MPC · JPL
1406 Komppa	1936 RF	Komppa	September 13, 1936	Turku	Y. Väisälä	·	24 km (15 mi)	MPC · JPL
1407 Lindelöf	1936 WC	Lindelöf	November 21, 1936	Turku	Y. Väisälä	·	20 km (12 mi)	MPC · JPL
1408 Trusanda	1936 WF	Trusanda	November 23, 1936	Heidelberg	K. Reinmuth	EOS	35 km (22 mi)	MPC · JPL
1409 Isko	1937 AK	Isko	January 8, 1937	Heidelberg	K. Reinmuth	·	36 km (22 mi)	MPC · JPL
1410 Margret	1937 AL	Margret	January 8, 1937	Heidelberg	K. Reinmuth	EOS	21 km (13 mi)	MPC · JPL
1411 Brauna	1937 AM	Brauna	January 8, 1937	Heidelberg	K. Reinmuth	·	28 km (17 mi)	MPC · JPL
1412 Lagrula	1937 BA	Lagrula	January 19, 1937	Algiers	L. Boyer	·	7.8 km (4.8 mi)	MPC · JPL
1413 Roucarie	1937 CD	Roucarie	February 12, 1937	Algiers	L. Boyer	EOS	20 km (12 mi)	MPC · JPL
1414 Jérôme	1937 CE	Jérôme	February 12, 1937	Algiers	L. Boyer	DOR	15 km (9.3 mi)	MPC · JPL
1415 Malautra	1937 EA	Malautra	March 4, 1937	Algiers	L. Boyer	slow	7.4 km (4.6 mi)	MPC · JPL
1416 Renauxa	1937 EC	Renauxa	March 4, 1937	Algiers	L. Boyer	EOS	28 km (17 mi)	MPC · JPL
1417 Walinskia	1937 GH	Walinskia	April 1, 1937	Heidelberg	K. Reinmuth	·	17 km (11 mi)	MPC · JPL
1418 Fayeta	1903 RG	Fayeta	September 22, 1903	Heidelberg	P. Götz	·	12 km (7.5 mi)	MPC · JPL
1419 Danzig	1929 RF	Danzig	September 5, 1929	Heidelberg	K. Reinmuth	·	15 km (9.3 mi)	MPC · JPL
1420 Radcliffe	1931 RJ	Radcliffe	September 14, 1931	Heidelberg	K. Reinmuth	·	21 km (13 mi)	MPC · JPL
1421 Esperanto	1936 FQ	Esperanto	March 18, 1936	Turku	Y. Väisälä	·	43 km (27 mi)	MPC · JPL
1422 Strömgrenia	1936 QF	Strömgrenia	August 23, 1936	Heidelberg	K. Reinmuth	·	5.8 km (3.6 mi)	MPC · JPL
1423 Jose	1936 QM	Jose	August 28, 1936	Uccle	Hunaerts, J.	KOR	20 km (12 mi)	MPC · JPL
1424 Sundmania	1937 AJ	Sundmania	January 9, 1937	Turku	Y. Väisälä	·	65 km (40 mi)	MPC · JPL
1425 Tuorla	1937 GB	Tuorla	April 3, 1937	Turku	K. Inkeri	EUN	12 km (7.5 mi)	MPC · JPL
1426 Riviera	1937 GF	Riviera	April 1, 1937	Nice	M. Laugier	·	18 km (11 mi)	MPC · JPL
1427 Ruvuma	1937 KB	Ruvuma	May 16, 1937	Johannesburg	C. Jackson	·	35 km (22 mi)	MPC · JPL
1428 Mombasa	1937 NO	Mombasa	July 5, 1937	Johannesburg	C. Jackson	·	52 km (32 mi)	MPC · JPL
1429 Pemba	1937 NH	Pemba	July 2, 1937	Johannesburg	C. Jackson	(887)	9.9 km (6.2 mi)	MPC · JPL
1430 Somalia	1937 NK	Somalia	July 5, 1937	Johannesburg	C. Jackson	(5)	9.4 km (5.8 mi)	MPC · JPL
1431 Luanda	1937 OB	Luanda	July 29, 1937	Johannesburg	C. Jackson	EUN	14 km (8.7 mi)	MPC · JPL
1432 Ethiopia	1937 PG	Ethiopia	August 1, 1937	Johannesburg	C. Jackson	·	7.1 km (4.4 mi)	MPC · JPL
1433 Geramtina	1937 UC	Geramtina	October 30, 1937	Uccle	E. Delporte	GEF · slow	13 km (8.1 mi)	MPC · JPL
1434 Margot	1936 FD_{1}	Margot	March 19, 1936	Crimea-Simeis	G. N. Neujmin	EOS	27 km (17 mi)	MPC · JPL
1435 Garlena	1936 WE	Garlena	November 23, 1936	Heidelberg	K. Reinmuth	·	15 km (9.3 mi)	MPC · JPL
1436 Salonta	1936 YA	Salonta	December 11, 1936	Konkoly	G. Kulin	·	54 km (34 mi)	MPC · JPL
1437 Diomedes	1937 PB	Diomedes	August 3, 1937	Heidelberg	K. Reinmuth	L4	118 km (73 mi)	MPC · JPL
1438 Wendeline	1937 TC	Wendeline	October 11, 1937	Heidelberg	K. Reinmuth	·	38 km (24 mi)	MPC · JPL
1439 Vogtia	1937 TE	Vogtia	October 11, 1937	Heidelberg	K. Reinmuth	3:2	51 km (32 mi)	MPC · JPL
1440 Rostia	1937 TF	Rostia	October 11, 1937	Heidelberg	K. Reinmuth	THM	15 km (9.3 mi)	MPC · JPL
1441 Bolyai	1937 WA	Bolyai	November 26, 1937	Konkoly	G. Kulin	slow	15 km (9.3 mi)	MPC · JPL
1442 Corvina	1937 YF	Corvina	December 29, 1937	Konkoly	G. Kulin	KOR	17 km (11 mi)	MPC · JPL
1443 Ruppina	1937 YG	Ruppina	December 29, 1937	Heidelberg	K. Reinmuth	KOR	16 km (9.9 mi)	MPC · JPL
1444 Pannonia	1938 AE	Pannonia	January 6, 1938	Konkoly	G. Kulin	·	26 km (16 mi)	MPC · JPL
1445 Konkolya	1938 AF	Konkolya	January 6, 1938	Konkoly	G. Kulin	THM	20 km (12 mi)	MPC · JPL
1446 Sillanpää	1938 BA	Sillanpää	January 26, 1938	Turku	Y. Väisälä	·	8.2 km (5.1 mi)	MPC · JPL
1447 Utra	1938 BB	Utra	January 26, 1938	Turku	Y. Väisälä	slow	12 km (7.5 mi)	MPC · JPL
1448 Lindbladia	1938 DF	Lindbladia	February 16, 1938	Turku	Y. Väisälä	·	21 km (13 mi)	MPC · JPL
1449 Virtanen	1938 DO	Virtanen	February 20, 1938	Turku	Y. Väisälä	·	9.3 km (5.8 mi)	MPC · JPL
1450 Raimonda	1938 DP	Raimonda	February 20, 1938	Turku	Y. Väisälä	·	18 km (11 mi)	MPC · JPL
1451 Granö	1938 DT	Granö	February 22, 1938	Turku	Y. Väisälä	slow	6.2 km (3.9 mi)	MPC · JPL
1452 Hunnia	1938 DZ_{1}	Hunnia	February 26, 1938	Konkoly	G. Kulin	·	21 km (13 mi)	MPC · JPL
1453 Fennia	1938 ED_{1}	Fennia	March 8, 1938	Turku	Y. Väisälä	H · moon	6.6 km (4.1 mi)	MPC · JPL
1454 Kalevala	1936 DO	Kalevala	February 16, 1936	Turku	Y. Väisälä	·	5.1 km (3.2 mi)	MPC · JPL
1455 Mitchella	1937 LF	Mitchella	June 5, 1937	Heidelberg	A. Bohrmann	slow	6.6 km (4.1 mi)	MPC · JPL
1456 Saldanha	1937 NG	Saldanha	July 2, 1937	Johannesburg	C. Jackson	·	38 km (24 mi)	MPC · JPL
1457 Ankara	1937 PA	Ankara	August 3, 1937	Heidelberg	K. Reinmuth	·	18 km (11 mi)	MPC · JPL
1458 Mineura	1937 RC	Mineura	September 1, 1937	Uccle	F. Rigaux	EUN · slow ·	17 km (11 mi)	MPC · JPL
1459 Magnya	1937 VA	Magnya	November 4, 1937	Crimea-Simeis	G. N. Neujmin	·	29 km (18 mi)	MPC · JPL
1460 Haltia	1937 WC	Haltia	November 24, 1937	Turku	Y. Väisälä	·	8.4 km (5.2 mi)	MPC · JPL
1461 Jean-Jacques	1937 YL	Jean-Jacques	December 30, 1937	Nice	M. Laugier	·	35 km (22 mi)	MPC · JPL
1462 Zamenhof	1938 CA	Zamenhof	February 6, 1938	Turku	Y. Väisälä	THM ·	27 km (17 mi)	MPC · JPL
1463 Nordenmarkia	1938 CB	Nordenmarkia	February 6, 1938	Turku	Y. Väisälä	·	37 km (23 mi)	MPC · JPL
1464 Armisticia	1939 VO	Armisticia	November 11, 1939	Williams Bay	G. Van Biesbroeck	EOS	23 km (14 mi)	MPC · JPL
1465 Autonoma	1938 FA	Autonoma	March 20, 1938	Hamburg-Bergedorf	A. Wachmann	·	18 km (11 mi)	MPC · JPL
1466 Mündleria	1938 KA	Mündleria	May 31, 1938	Heidelberg	K. Reinmuth	PHO	22 km (14 mi)	MPC · JPL
1467 Mashona	1938 OE	Mashona	July 30, 1938	Johannesburg	C. Jackson	CYB	89 km (55 mi)	MPC · JPL
1468 Zomba	1938 PA	Zomba	July 23, 1938	Johannesburg	C. Jackson	·	8.3 km (5.2 mi)	MPC · JPL
1469 Linzia	1938 QD	Linzia	August 19, 1938	Heidelberg	K. Reinmuth	·	75 km (47 mi)	MPC · JPL
1470 Carla	1938 SD	Carla	September 17, 1938	Heidelberg	A. Bohrmann	·	37 km (23 mi)	MPC · JPL
1471 Tornio	1938 SL_{1}	Tornio	September 16, 1938	Turku	Y. Väisälä	·	29 km (18 mi)	MPC · JPL
1472 Muonio	1938 UQ	Muonio	October 18, 1938	Turku	Y. Väisälä	·	8.4 km (5.2 mi)	MPC · JPL
1473 Ounas	1938 UT	Ounas	October 22, 1938	Turku	Y. Väisälä	slow	18 km (11 mi)	MPC · JPL
1474 Beira	1935 QY	Beira	August 20, 1935	Johannesburg	C. Jackson	·	20 km (12 mi)	MPC · JPL
1475 Yalta	1935 SM	Yalta	September 21, 1935	Crimea-Simeis	P. F. Shajn	·	10 km (6.2 mi)	MPC · JPL
1476 Cox	1936 RA	Cox	September 10, 1936	Uccle	E. Delporte	·	7.4 km (4.6 mi)	MPC · JPL
1477 Bonsdorffia	1938 CC	Bonsdorffia	February 6, 1938	Turku	Y. Väisälä	·	26 km (16 mi)	MPC · JPL
1478 Vihuri	1938 CF	Vihuri	February 6, 1938	Turku	Y. Väisälä	·	9.5 km (5.9 mi)	MPC · JPL
1479 Inkeri	1938 DE	Inkeri	February 16, 1938	Turku	Y. Väisälä	slow	15 km (9.3 mi)	MPC · JPL
1480 Aunus	1938 DK	Aunus	February 18, 1938	Turku	Y. Väisälä	moon	6.4 km (4.0 mi)	MPC · JPL
1481 Tübingia	1938 DR	Tübingia	February 7, 1938	Heidelberg	K. Reinmuth	slow	34 km (21 mi)	MPC · JPL
1482 Sebastiana	1938 DA_{1}	Sebastiana	February 20, 1938	Heidelberg	K. Reinmuth	KOR	17 km (11 mi)	MPC · JPL
1483 Hakoila	1938 DJ_{1}	Hakoila	February 24, 1938	Turku	Y. Väisälä	slow	11 km (6.8 mi)	MPC · JPL
1484 Postrema	1938 HC	Postrema	April 29, 1938	Crimea-Simeis	G. N. Neujmin	·	41 km (25 mi)	MPC · JPL
1485 Isa	1938 OB	Isa	July 28, 1938	Heidelberg	K. Reinmuth	EOS	17 km (11 mi)	MPC · JPL
1486 Marilyn	1938 QA	Marilyn	August 23, 1938	Uccle	E. Delporte	·	6.4 km (4.0 mi)	MPC · JPL
1487 Boda	1938 WC	Boda	November 17, 1938	Heidelberg	K. Reinmuth	THM ·	26 km (16 mi)	MPC · JPL
1488 Aura	1938 XE	Aura	December 15, 1938	Turku	Y. Väisälä	·	25 km (16 mi)	MPC · JPL
1489 Attila	1939 GC	Attila	April 12, 1939	Konkoly	G. Kulin	·	27 km (17 mi)	MPC · JPL
1490 Limpopo	1936 LB	Limpopo	June 14, 1936	Johannesburg	C. Jackson	·	15 km (9.3 mi)	MPC · JPL
1491 Balduinus	1938 EJ	Balduinus	February 23, 1938	Uccle	E. Delporte	·	22 km (14 mi)	MPC · JPL
1492 Oppolzer	1938 FL	Oppolzer	March 23, 1938	Turku	Y. Väisälä	·	12 km (7.5 mi)	MPC · JPL
1493 Sigrid	1938 QB	Sigrid	August 26, 1938	Uccle	E. Delporte	·	29 km (18 mi)	MPC · JPL
1494 Savo	1938 SJ	Savo	September 16, 1938	Turku	Y. Väisälä	·	7.8 km (4.8 mi)	MPC · JPL
1495 Helsinki	1938 SW	Helsinki	September 21, 1938	Turku	Y. Väisälä	EUN	12 km (7.5 mi)	MPC · JPL
1496 Turku	1938 SA_{1}	Turku	September 22, 1938	Turku	Y. Väisälä	·	7.8 km (4.8 mi)	MPC · JPL
1497 Tampere	1938 SB_{1}	Tampere	September 22, 1938	Turku	Y. Väisälä	KOR	16 km (9.9 mi)	MPC · JPL
1498 Lahti	1938 SK_{1}	Lahti	September 16, 1938	Turku	Y. Väisälä	·	32 km (20 mi)	MPC · JPL
1499 Pori	1938 UF	Pori	October 16, 1938	Turku	Y. Väisälä	EUN	15 km (9.3 mi)	MPC · JPL
1500 Jyväskylä	1938 UH	Jyväskylä	October 16, 1938	Turku	Y. Väisälä	·	8.1 km (5.0 mi)	MPC · JPL

== 1501–1600 ==
back to top

Designation			Discovery			Properties		Ref
Permanent	Provisional	Named after	Date	Site	Discoverer(s)	Category	Diam.	Ref
1501 Baade	1938 UJ	Baade	October 20, 1938	Hamburg-Bergedorf	A. Wachmann	·	11 km (6.8 mi)	MPC · JPL
1502 Arenda	1938 WB	Arenda	November 17, 1938	Heidelberg	K. Reinmuth	·	36 km (22 mi)	MPC · JPL
1503 Kuopio	1938 XD	Kuopio	December 15, 1938	Turku	Y. Väisälä	EUN	23 km (14 mi)	MPC · JPL
1504 Lappeenranta	1939 FM	Lappeenranta	March 23, 1939	Turku	L. Oterma	·	11 km (6.8 mi)	MPC · JPL
1505 Koranna	1939 HH	Koranna	April 21, 1939	Johannesburg	C. Jackson	·	22 km (14 mi)	MPC · JPL
1506 Xosa	1939 JC	Xosa	May 15, 1939	Johannesburg	C. Jackson	slow	14 km (8.7 mi)	MPC · JPL
1507 Vaasa	1939 RD	Vaasa	September 12, 1939	Turku	L. Oterma	·	4.6 km (2.9 mi)	MPC · JPL
1508 Kemi	1938 UP	Kemi	October 21, 1938	Turku	H. Alikoski	·	20 km (12 mi)	MPC · JPL
1509 Esclangona	1938 YG	Esclangona	December 21, 1938	Nice	A. Patry	H · moon	8.2 km (5.1 mi)	MPC · JPL
1510 Charlois	1939 DC	Charlois	February 22, 1939	Nice	A. Patry	·	25 km (16 mi)	MPC · JPL
1511 Daléra	1939 FB	Daléra	March 22, 1939	Algiers	L. Boyer	·	14 km (8.7 mi)	MPC · JPL
1512 Oulu	1939 FE	Oulu	March 18, 1939	Turku	H. Alikoski	3:2 · slow	80 km (50 mi)	MPC · JPL
1513 Mátra	1940 EB	Mátra	March 10, 1940	Konkoly	G. Kulin	slow	6.6 km (4.1 mi)	MPC · JPL
1514 Ricouxa	1906 UR	Ricouxa	August 22, 1906	Heidelberg	M. F. Wolf	·	7.8 km (4.8 mi)	MPC · JPL
1515 Perrotin	1936 VG	Perrotin	November 15, 1936	Nice	A. Patry	·	6.5 km (4.0 mi)	MPC · JPL
1516 Henry	1938 BG	Henry	January 28, 1938	Nice	A. Patry	·	26 km (16 mi)	MPC · JPL
1517 Beograd	1938 FD	Beograd	March 20, 1938	Belgrade	M. B. Protić	·	40 km (25 mi)	MPC · JPL
1518 Rovaniemi	1938 UA	Rovaniemi	October 15, 1938	Turku	Y. Väisälä	·	8.5 km (5.3 mi)	MPC · JPL
1519 Kajaani	1938 UB	Kajaani	October 15, 1938	Turku	Y. Väisälä	·	31 km (19 mi)	MPC · JPL
1520 Imatra	1938 UY	Imatra	October 22, 1938	Turku	Y. Väisälä	·	53 km (33 mi)	MPC · JPL
1521 Seinäjoki	1938 UB_{1}	Seinäjoki	October 22, 1938	Turku	Y. Väisälä	BRA	15 km (9.3 mi)	MPC · JPL
1522 Kokkola	1938 WO	Kokkola	November 18, 1938	Turku	L. Oterma	·	9.4 km (5.8 mi)	MPC · JPL
1523 Pieksämäki	1939 BC	Pieksämäki	January 18, 1939	Turku	Y. Väisälä	·	9.1 km (5.7 mi)	MPC · JPL
1524 Joensuu	1939 SB	Joensuu	September 18, 1939	Turku	Y. Väisälä	·	45 km (28 mi)	MPC · JPL
1525 Savonlinna	1939 SC	Savonlinna	September 18, 1939	Turku	Y. Väisälä	·	12 km (7.5 mi)	MPC · JPL
1526 Mikkeli	1939 TF	Mikkeli	October 7, 1939	Turku	Y. Väisälä	moon	5.3 km (3.3 mi)	MPC · JPL
1527 Malmquista	1939 UG	Malmquista	October 18, 1939	Turku	Y. Väisälä	·	10 km (6.2 mi)	MPC · JPL
1528 Conrada	1940 CA	Conrada	February 10, 1940	Heidelberg	K. Reinmuth	·	11 km (6.8 mi)	MPC · JPL
1529 Oterma	1938 BC	Oterma	January 26, 1938	Turku	Y. Väisälä	HIL · 3:2	56 km (35 mi)	MPC · JPL
1530 Rantaseppä	1938 SG	Rantaseppä	September 16, 1938	Turku	Y. Väisälä	·	5.0 km (3.1 mi)	MPC · JPL
1531 Hartmut	1938 SH	Hartmut	September 17, 1938	Heidelberg	A. Bohrmann	EUN	10 km (6.2 mi)	MPC · JPL
1532 Inari	1938 SM	Inari	September 16, 1938	Turku	Y. Väisälä	EOS ·	24 km (15 mi)	MPC · JPL
1533 Saimaa	1939 BD	Saimaa	January 19, 1939	Turku	Y. Väisälä	EOS	24 km (15 mi)	MPC · JPL
1534 Näsi	1939 BK	Näsi	January 20, 1939	Turku	Y. Väisälä	CLO ·	22 km (14 mi)	MPC · JPL
1535 Päijänne	1939 RC	Päijänne	September 9, 1939	Turku	Y. Väisälä	·	24 km (15 mi)	MPC · JPL
1536 Pielinen	1939 SE	Pielinen	September 18, 1939	Turku	Y. Väisälä	·	8.0 km (5.0 mi)	MPC · JPL
1537 Transylvania	1940 QA	Transylvania	August 27, 1940	Konkoly	G. Strommer	slow	20 km (12 mi)	MPC · JPL
1538 Detre	1940 RF	Detre	September 8, 1940	Konkoly	G. Kulin	·	6.1 km (3.8 mi)	MPC · JPL
1539 Borrelly	1940 UB	Borrelly	October 29, 1940	Nice	A. Patry	THM ·	27 km (17 mi)	MPC · JPL
1540 Kevola	1938 WK	Kevola	November 16, 1938	Turku	L. Oterma	·	44 km (27 mi)	MPC · JPL
1541 Estonia	1939 CK	Estonia	February 12, 1939	Turku	Y. Väisälä	·	22 km (14 mi)	MPC · JPL
1542 Schalén	1941 QE	Schalén	August 26, 1941	Turku	Y. Väisälä	·	42 km (26 mi)	MPC · JPL
1543 Bourgeois	1941 SJ	Bourgeois	September 21, 1941	Uccle	E. Delporte	·	12 km (7.5 mi)	MPC · JPL
1544 Vinterhansenia	1941 UK	Vinterhansenia	October 15, 1941	Turku	L. Oterma	·	25 km (16 mi)	MPC · JPL
1545 Thernöe	1941 UW	Thernöe	October 15, 1941	Turku	L. Oterma	·	19 km (12 mi)	MPC · JPL
1546 Izsák	1941 SG_{1}	Izsák	September 28, 1941	Konkoly	G. Kulin	·	26 km (16 mi)	MPC · JPL
1547 Nele	1929 CZ	Nele	February 12, 1929	Uccle	Bourgeois, P.	(1547) ·	21 km (13 mi)	MPC · JPL
1548 Palomaa	1935 FK	Palomaa	March 26, 1935	Turku	Y. Väisälä	·	31 km (19 mi)	MPC · JPL
1549 Mikko	1937 GA	Mikko	April 2, 1937	Turku	Y. Väisälä	·	10 km (6.2 mi)	MPC · JPL
1550 Tito	1937 WD	Tito	November 29, 1937	Belgrade	M. B. Protić	(887)	11 km (6.8 mi)	MPC · JPL
1551 Argelander	1938 DC_{1}	Argelander	February 24, 1938	Turku	Y. Väisälä	·	10 km (6.2 mi)	MPC · JPL
1552 Bessel	1938 DE_{1}	Bessel	February 24, 1938	Turku	Y. Väisälä	EOS	19 km (12 mi)	MPC · JPL
1553 Bauersfelda	1940 AD	Bauersfelda	January 13, 1940	Heidelberg	K. Reinmuth	·	14 km (8.7 mi)	MPC · JPL
1554 Yugoslavia	1940 RE	Yugoslavia	September 6, 1940	Belgrade	M. B. Protić	EUN ·	16 km (9.9 mi)	MPC · JPL
1555 Dejan	1941 SA	Dejan	September 15, 1941	Uccle	F. Rigaux	·	23 km (14 mi)	MPC · JPL
1556 Wingolfia	1942 AA	Wingolfia	January 14, 1942	Heidelberg	K. Reinmuth	CYB	29 km (18 mi)	MPC · JPL
1557 Roehla	1942 AD	Roehla	January 14, 1942	Heidelberg	K. Reinmuth	EOS	19 km (12 mi)	MPC · JPL
1558 Järnefelt	1942 BD	Järnefelt	January 20, 1942	Turku	L. Oterma	·	55 km (34 mi)	MPC · JPL
1559 Kustaanheimo	1942 BF	Kustaanheimo	January 20, 1942	Turku	L. Oterma	·	11 km (6.8 mi)	MPC · JPL
1560 Strattonia	1942 XB	Strattonia	December 3, 1942	Uccle	E. Delporte	·	24 km (15 mi)	MPC · JPL
1561 Fricke	1941 CG	Fricke	February 15, 1941	Heidelberg	K. Reinmuth	HYG	25 km (16 mi)	MPC · JPL
1562 Gondolatsch	1943 EE	Gondolatsch	March 9, 1943	Heidelberg	K. Reinmuth	·	9.6 km (6.0 mi)	MPC · JPL
1563 Noël	1943 EG	Noël	March 7, 1943	Uccle	S. J. Arend	·	7.2 km (4.5 mi)	MPC · JPL
1564 Srbija	1936 TB	Srbija	October 15, 1936	Belgrade	M. B. Protić	·	42 km (26 mi)	MPC · JPL
1565 Lemaître	1948 WA	Lemaître	November 25, 1948	Uccle	S. J. Arend	·	7.9 km (4.9 mi)	MPC · JPL
1566 Icarus	1949 MA	Icarus	June 27, 1949	Palomar	W. Baade	APO +1 km (0.62 mi) · PHA	1.0 km (0.62 mi)	MPC · JPL
1567 Alikoski	1941 HN	Alikoski	April 22, 1941	Turku	Y. Väisälä	URS	69 km (43 mi)	MPC · JPL
1568 Aisleen	1946 QB	Aisleen	August 21, 1946	Johannesburg	E. L. Johnson	PHO	12 km (7.5 mi)	MPC · JPL
1569 Evita	1948 PA	Evita	August 3, 1948	La Plata Observatory	M. Itzigsohn	·	36 km (22 mi)	MPC · JPL
1570 Brunonia	1948 TX	Brunonia	October 9, 1948	Uccle	S. J. Arend	KOR · slow	12 km (7.5 mi)	MPC · JPL
1571 Cesco	1950 FJ	Cesco	March 20, 1950	La Plata Observatory	M. Itzigsohn	·	18 km (11 mi)	MPC · JPL
1572 Posnania	1949 SC	Posnania	September 22, 1949	Poznań	J. Dobrzycki, Kwiek, A.	·	32 km (20 mi)	MPC · JPL
1573 Väisälä	1949 UA	Väisälä	October 27, 1949	Uccle	S. J. Arend	PHO · slow	9.1 km (5.7 mi)	MPC · JPL
1574 Meyer	1949 FD	Meyer	March 22, 1949	Algiers	L. Boyer	CYB	58 km (36 mi)	MPC · JPL
1575 Winifred	1950 HH	Winifred	April 20, 1950	Brooklyn	Indiana University	PHO · slow	9.5 km (5.9 mi)	MPC · JPL
1576 Fabiola	1948 SA	Fabiola	September 30, 1948	Uccle	S. J. Arend	THM	27 km (17 mi)	MPC · JPL
1577 Reiss	1949 BA	Reiss	January 19, 1949	Algiers	L. Boyer	·	5.6 km (3.5 mi)	MPC · JPL
1578 Kirkwood	1951 AT	Kirkwood	January 10, 1951	Brooklyn	Indiana University	3:2	47 km (29 mi)	MPC · JPL
1579 Herrick	1948 SB	Herrick	September 30, 1948	Uccle	S. J. Arend	CYB	47 km (29 mi)	MPC · JPL
1580 Betulia	1950 KA	Betulia	May 22, 1950	Johannesburg	E. L. Johnson	AMO +1 km (0.62 mi)	5.8 km (3.6 mi)	MPC · JPL
1581 Abanderada	1950 LA_{1}	Abanderada	June 15, 1950	La Plata Observatory	M. Itzigsohn	THM · slow	30 km (19 mi)	MPC · JPL
1582 Martir	1950 LY	Martir	June 15, 1950	La Plata Observatory	M. Itzigsohn	·	37 km (23 mi)	MPC · JPL
1583 Antilochus	1950 SA	Antilochus	September 19, 1950	Uccle	S. J. Arend	L4	109 km (68 mi)	MPC · JPL
1584 Fuji	1927 CR	Fuji	February 7, 1927	Tokyo	O. Oikawa	PHO	19 km (12 mi)	MPC · JPL
1585 Union	1947 RG	Union	September 7, 1947	Johannesburg	E. L. Johnson	·	55 km (34 mi)	MPC · JPL
1586 Thiele	1939 CJ	Thiele	February 13, 1939	Hamburg-Bergedorf	A. Wachmann	·	11 km (6.8 mi)	MPC · JPL
1587 Kahrstedt	1933 FS_{1}	Kahrstedt	March 25, 1933	Heidelberg	K. Reinmuth	·	15 km (9.3 mi)	MPC · JPL
1588 Descamisada	1951 MH	Descamisada	June 27, 1951	La Plata Observatory	M. Itzigsohn	EOS	18 km (11 mi)	MPC · JPL
1589 Fanatica	1950 RK	Fanatica	September 13, 1950	La Plata Observatory	M. Itzigsohn	·	11 km (6.8 mi)	MPC · JPL
1590 Tsiolkovskaja	1933 NA	Tsiolkovskaja	July 1, 1933	Crimea-Simeis	G. N. Neujmin	·	10 km (6.2 mi)	MPC · JPL
1591 Baize	1951 KA	Baize	May 31, 1951	Uccle	S. J. Arend	PHO	14 km (8.7 mi)	MPC · JPL
1592 Mathieu	1951 LA	Mathieu	June 1, 1951	Uccle	S. J. Arend	·	14 km (8.7 mi)	MPC · JPL
1593 Fagnes	1951 LB	Fagnes	June 1, 1951	Uccle	S. J. Arend	·	6.1 km (3.8 mi)	MPC · JPL
1594 Danjon	1949 WA	Danjon	November 23, 1949	Algiers	L. Boyer	slow	11 km (6.8 mi)	MPC · JPL
1595 Tanga	1930 ME	Tanga	June 19, 1930	Johannesburg	C. Jackson, H. E. Wood	·	27 km (17 mi)	MPC · JPL
1596 Itzigsohn	1951 EV	Itzigsohn	March 8, 1951	La Plata Observatory	M. Itzigsohn	·	46 km (29 mi)	MPC · JPL
1597 Laugier	1949 EB	Laugier	March 7, 1949	Algiers	L. Boyer	·	13 km (8.1 mi)	MPC · JPL
1598 Paloque	1950 CA	Paloque	February 11, 1950	Algiers	L. Boyer	·	9.7 km (6.0 mi)	MPC · JPL
1599 Giomus	1950 WA	Giomus	November 17, 1950	Algiers	L. Boyer	HYG	41 km (25 mi)	MPC · JPL
1600 Vyssotsky	1947 UC	Vyssotsky	October 22, 1947	Mount Hamilton	C. A. Wirtanen	H	7.4 km (4.6 mi)	MPC · JPL

== 1601–1700 ==
back to top

Designation			Discovery			Properties		Ref
Permanent	Provisional	Named after	Date	Site	Discoverer(s)	Category	Diam.	Ref
1601 Patry	1942 KA	Patry	May 18, 1942	Algiers	L. Boyer	·	7.5 km (4.7 mi)	MPC · JPL
1602 Indiana	1950 GF	Indiana	March 14, 1950	Brooklyn	Indiana University	·	8.0 km (5.0 mi)	MPC · JPL
1603 Neva	1926 VH	Neva	November 4, 1926	Crimea-Simeis	G. N. Neujmin	·	40 km (25 mi)	MPC · JPL
1604 Tombaugh	1931 FH	Tombaugh	March 24, 1931	Flagstaff	C. O. Lampland	EOS	32 km (20 mi)	MPC · JPL
1605 Milankovitch	1936 GA	Milankovitch	April 13, 1936	Uccle	P. Đurković	EOS	30 km (19 mi)	MPC · JPL
1606 Jekhovsky	1950 RH	Jekhovsky	September 14, 1950	Algiers	L. Boyer	slow	19 km (12 mi)	MPC · JPL
1607 Mavis	1950 RA	Mavis	September 3, 1950	Johannesburg	E. L. Johnson	(887)	13 km (8.1 mi)	MPC · JPL
1608 Muñoz	1951 RZ	Muñoz	September 1, 1951	La Plata Observatory	M. Itzigsohn	(254)	6.7 km (4.2 mi)	MPC · JPL
1609 Brenda	1951 NL	Brenda	July 10, 1951	Johannesburg	E. L. Johnson	(194)	30 km (19 mi)	MPC · JPL
1610 Mirnaya	1928 RT	Mirnaya	September 11, 1928	Crimea-Simeis	P. F. Shajn	·	6.1 km (3.8 mi)	MPC · JPL
1611 Beyer	1950 DJ	Beyer	February 17, 1950	Heidelberg	K. Reinmuth	HYG	24 km (15 mi)	MPC · JPL
1612 Hirose	1950 BJ	Hirose	January 23, 1950	Heidelberg	K. Reinmuth	·	19 km (12 mi)	MPC · JPL
1613 Smiley	1950 SD	Smiley	September 16, 1950	Uccle	S. J. Arend	CLO ·	18 km (11 mi)	MPC · JPL
1614 Goldschmidt	1952 HA	Goldschmidt	April 18, 1952	Uccle	A. Schmitt	·	48 km (30 mi)	MPC · JPL
1615 Bardwell	1950 BW	Bardwell	January 28, 1950	Brooklyn	Indiana University	THM	29 km (18 mi)	MPC · JPL
1616 Filipoff	1950 EA	Filipoff	March 15, 1950	Algiers	L. Boyer	·	24 km (15 mi)	MPC · JPL
1617 Alschmitt	1952 FB	Alschmitt	March 20, 1952	Algiers	L. Boyer	·	21 km (13 mi)	MPC · JPL
1618 Dawn	1948 NF	Dawn	July 5, 1948	Johannesburg	E. L. Johnson	KOR	17 km (11 mi)	MPC · JPL
1619 Ueta	1953 TA	Ueta	October 11, 1953	Kwasan	Mitani, T.	·	9.0 km (5.6 mi)	MPC · JPL
1620 Geographos	1951 RA	Geographos	September 14, 1951	Palomar	A. G. Wilson, R. Minkowski	APO +1 km (0.62 mi) · PHA	2.6 km (1.6 mi)	MPC · JPL
1621 Druzhba	1926 TM	Druzhba	October 1, 1926	Crimea-Simeis	S. Belyavsky	·	13 km (8.1 mi)	MPC · JPL
1622 Chacornac	1952 EA	Chacornac	March 15, 1952	Uccle	A. Schmitt	·	8.4 km (5.2 mi)	MPC · JPL
1623 Vivian	1948 PL	Vivian	August 9, 1948	Johannesburg	E. L. Johnson	THM	28 km (17 mi)	MPC · JPL
1624 Rabe	1931 TT_{1}	Rabe	October 9, 1931	Heidelberg	K. Reinmuth	THM	26 km (16 mi)	MPC · JPL
1625 The NORC	1953 RB	The NORC	September 1, 1953	Uccle	S. J. Arend	·	53 km (33 mi)	MPC · JPL
1626 Sadeya	1927 AA	Sadeya	January 10, 1927	Barcelona	J. Comas i Solà	moon	15 km (9.3 mi)	MPC · JPL
1627 Ivar	1929 SH	Ivar	September 25, 1929	Johannesburg	E. Hertzsprung	AMO +1 km (0.62 mi)	9.1 km (5.7 mi)	MPC · JPL
1628 Strobel	1923 OG	Strobel	September 11, 1923	Heidelberg	K. Reinmuth	·	59 km (37 mi)	MPC · JPL
1629 Pecker	1952 DB	Pecker	February 28, 1952	Algiers	L. Boyer	·	8.5 km (5.3 mi)	MPC · JPL
1630 Milet	1952 DA	Milet	February 28, 1952	Algiers	L. Boyer	·	19 km (12 mi)	MPC · JPL
1631 Kopff	1936 UC	Kopff	October 11, 1936	Turku	Y. Väisälä	·	8.6 km (5.3 mi)	MPC · JPL
1632 Sieböhme	1941 DF	Sieböhme	February 26, 1941	Heidelberg	K. Reinmuth	·	29 km (18 mi)	MPC · JPL
1633 Chimay	1929 EC	Chimay	March 3, 1929	Uccle	S. J. Arend	THM	37 km (23 mi)	MPC · JPL
1634 Ndola	1935 QP	Ndola	August 19, 1935	Johannesburg	C. Jackson	·	9.0 km (5.6 mi)	MPC · JPL
1635 Bohrmann	1924 QW	Bohrmann	March 7, 1924	Heidelberg	K. Reinmuth	KOR	17 km (11 mi)	MPC · JPL
1636 Porter	1950 BH	Porter	January 23, 1950	Heidelberg	K. Reinmuth	·	8.4 km (5.2 mi)	MPC · JPL
1637 Swings	1936 QO	Swings	August 28, 1936	Uccle	Hunaerts, J.	·	53 km (33 mi)	MPC · JPL
1638 Ruanda	1935 JF	Ruanda	May 3, 1935	Johannesburg	C. Jackson	·	19 km (12 mi)	MPC · JPL
1639 Bower	1951 RB	Bower	September 12, 1951	Uccle	S. J. Arend	·	36 km (22 mi)	MPC · JPL
1640 Nemo	1951 QA	Nemo	August 31, 1951	Uccle	S. J. Arend	·	6.1 km (3.8 mi)	MPC · JPL
1641 Tana	1935 OJ	Tana	July 25, 1935	Johannesburg	C. Jackson	EOS	26 km (16 mi)	MPC · JPL
1642 Hill	1951 RU	Hill	September 4, 1951	Heidelberg	K. Reinmuth	·	16 km (9.9 mi)	MPC · JPL
1643 Brown	1951 RQ	Brown	September 4, 1951	Heidelberg	K. Reinmuth	·	9.5 km (5.9 mi)	MPC · JPL
1644 Rafita	1935 YA	Rafita	December 16, 1935	Madrid	R. Carrasco	·	14 km (8.7 mi)	MPC · JPL
1645 Waterfield	1933 OJ	Waterfield	July 24, 1933	Heidelberg	K. Reinmuth	·	28 km (17 mi)	MPC · JPL
1646 Rosseland	1939 BG	Rosseland	January 19, 1939	Turku	Y. Väisälä	·	13 km (8.1 mi)	MPC · JPL
1647 Menelaus	1957 MK	Menelaus	June 23, 1957	Palomar	S. B. Nicholson	L4	43 km (27 mi)	MPC · JPL
1648 Shajna	1935 RF	Shajna	September 5, 1935	Crimea-Simeis	P. F. Shajn	·	9.4 km (5.8 mi)	MPC · JPL
1649 Fabre	1951 DE	Fabre	February 27, 1951	Algiers	L. Boyer	EOS	15 km (9.3 mi)	MPC · JPL
1650 Heckmann	1937 TG	Heckmann	October 11, 1937	Heidelberg	K. Reinmuth	·	30 km (19 mi)	MPC · JPL
1651 Behrens	1936 HD	Behrens	April 23, 1936	Nice	M. Laugier	·	9.0 km (5.6 mi)	MPC · JPL
1652 Hergé	1953 PA	Hergé	August 9, 1953	Uccle	S. J. Arend	·	8.7 km (5.4 mi)	MPC · JPL
1653 Yakhontovia	1937 RA	Yakhontovia	August 30, 1937	Crimea-Simeis	G. N. Neujmin	·	9.0 km (5.6 mi)	MPC · JPL
1654 Bojeva	1931 TL	Bojeva	October 8, 1931	Crimea-Simeis	P. F. Shajn	EOS	25 km (16 mi)	MPC · JPL
1655 Comas Solà	1929 WG	Comas Solà	November 28, 1929	Barcelona	J. Comas i Solà	·	36 km (22 mi)	MPC · JPL
1656 Suomi	1942 EC	Suomi	March 11, 1942	Turku	Y. Väisälä	H	7.9 km (4.9 mi)	MPC · JPL
1657 Roemera	1961 EA	Roemera	March 6, 1961	Zimmerwald	P. Wild	PHO · slow	7.7 km (4.8 mi)	MPC · JPL
1658 Innes	1953 NA	Innes	July 13, 1953	Johannesburg	Bruwer, J. A.	RAF	13 km (8.1 mi)	MPC · JPL
1659 Punkaharju	1940 YL	Punkaharju	December 28, 1940	Turku	Y. Väisälä	·	28 km (17 mi)	MPC · JPL
1660 Wood	1953 GA	Wood	April 7, 1953	Johannesburg	Bruwer, J. A.	·	11 km (6.8 mi)	MPC · JPL
1661 Granule	A916 FA	Granule	March 31, 1916	Heidelberg	M. F. Wolf	·	7.1 km (4.4 mi)	MPC · JPL
1662 Hoffmann	A923 RB	Hoffmann	September 11, 1923	Heidelberg	K. Reinmuth	MRX	12 km (7.5 mi)	MPC · JPL
1663 van den Bos	1926 PE	van den Bos	August 4, 1926	Johannesburg	H. E. Wood	slow	14 km (8.7 mi)	MPC · JPL
1664 Felix	1929 CD	Felix	February 4, 1929	Uccle	E. Delporte	·	8.4 km (5.2 mi)	MPC · JPL
1665 Gaby	1930 DQ	Gaby	February 27, 1930	Heidelberg	K. Reinmuth	slow	11 km (6.8 mi)	MPC · JPL
1666 van Gent	1930 OG	van Gent	July 22, 1930	Johannesburg	H. van Gent	·	7.7 km (4.8 mi)	MPC · JPL
1667 Pels	1930 SY	Pels	September 16, 1930	Johannesburg	H. van Gent	·	9.0 km (5.6 mi)	MPC · JPL
1668 Hanna	1933 OK	Hanna	July 24, 1933	Heidelberg	K. Reinmuth	·	25 km (16 mi)	MPC · JPL
1669 Dagmar	1934 RS	Dagmar	September 7, 1934	Heidelberg	K. Reinmuth	THM	42 km (26 mi)	MPC · JPL
1670 Minnaert	1934 RZ	Minnaert	September 9, 1934	Johannesburg	H. van Gent	·	21 km (13 mi)	MPC · JPL
1671 Chaika	1934 TD	Chaika	October 3, 1934	Crimea-Simeis	G. N. Neujmin	(5)	9.4 km (5.8 mi)	MPC · JPL
1672 Gezelle	1935 BD	Gezelle	January 29, 1935	Uccle	E. Delporte	·	26 km (16 mi)	MPC · JPL
1673 van Houten	1937 TH	van Houten	October 11, 1937	Heidelberg	K. Reinmuth	·	21 km (13 mi)	MPC · JPL
1674 Groeneveld	1938 DS	Groeneveld	February 7, 1938	Heidelberg	K. Reinmuth	THM	32 km (20 mi)	MPC · JPL
1675 Simonida	1938 FB	Simonida	March 20, 1938	Belgrade	M. B. Protić	·	11 km (6.8 mi)	MPC · JPL
1676 Kariba	1939 LC	Kariba	June 15, 1939	Johannesburg	C. Jackson	·	7.6 km (4.7 mi)	MPC · JPL
1677 Tycho Brahe	1940 RO	Tycho Brahe	September 6, 1940	Turku	Y. Väisälä	MAR	12 km (7.5 mi)	MPC · JPL
1678 Hveen	1940 YH	Hveen	December 28, 1940	Turku	Y. Väisälä	·	43 km (27 mi)	MPC · JPL
1679 Nevanlinna	1941 FR	Nevanlinna	March 18, 1941	Turku	L. Oterma	·	53 km (33 mi)	MPC · JPL
1680 Per Brahe	1942 CH	Per Brahe	February 12, 1942	Turku	L. Oterma	·	14 km (8.7 mi)	MPC · JPL
1681 Steinmetz	1948 WE	Steinmetz	November 23, 1948	Nice	M. Laugier	·	16 km (9.9 mi)	MPC · JPL
1682 Karel	1949 PH	Karel	August 2, 1949	Heidelberg	K. Reinmuth	·	7.3 km (4.5 mi)	MPC · JPL
1683 Castafiore	1950 SL	Castafiore	September 19, 1950	Uccle	S. J. Arend	·	21 km (13 mi)	MPC · JPL
1684 Iguassú	1951 QE	Iguassú	August 23, 1951	La Plata Observatory	M. Itzigsohn	THM	30 km (19 mi)	MPC · JPL
1685 Toro	1948 OA	Toro	July 17, 1948	Mount Hamilton	C. A. Wirtanen	APO +1 km (0.62 mi)	3.4 km (2.1 mi)	MPC · JPL
1686 De Sitter	1935 SR_{1}	De Sitter	September 28, 1935	Johannesburg	H. van Gent	THM	30 km (19 mi)	MPC · JPL
1687 Glarona	1965 SC	Glarona	September 19, 1965	Zimmerwald	P. Wild	THM	38 km (24 mi)	MPC · JPL
1688 Wilkens	1951 EQ_{1}	Wilkens	March 3, 1951	La Plata Observatory	M. Itzigsohn	·	16 km (9.9 mi)	MPC · JPL
1689 Floris-Jan	1930 SO	Floris-Jan	September 16, 1930	Johannesburg	H. van Gent	slow	14 km (8.7 mi)	MPC · JPL
1690 Mayrhofer	1948 VB	Mayrhofer	November 8, 1948	Nice	M. Laugier	·	34 km (21 mi)	MPC · JPL
1691 Oort	1956 RB	Oort	September 9, 1956	Heidelberg	K. Reinmuth	THM	34 km (21 mi)	MPC · JPL
1692 Subbotina	1936 QD	Subbotina	August 16, 1936	Crimea-Simeis	G. N. Neujmin	·	36 km (22 mi)	MPC · JPL
1693 Hertzsprung	1935 LA	Hertzsprung	May 5, 1935	Johannesburg	H. van Gent	·	38 km (24 mi)	MPC · JPL
1694 Kaiser	1934 SB	Kaiser	September 29, 1934	Johannesburg	H. van Gent	·	16 km (9.9 mi)	MPC · JPL
1695 Walbeck	1941 UO	Walbeck	October 15, 1941	Turku	L. Oterma	·	19 km (12 mi)	MPC · JPL
1696 Nurmela	1939 FF	Nurmela	March 18, 1939	Turku	Y. Väisälä	·	9.2 km (5.7 mi)	MPC · JPL
1697 Koskenniemi	1940 RM	Koskenniemi	September 8, 1940	Turku	H. Alikoski	·	11 km (6.8 mi)	MPC · JPL
1698 Christophe	1934 CS	Christophe	February 10, 1934	Uccle	E. Delporte	THM	26 km (16 mi)	MPC · JPL
1699 Honkasalo	1941 QD	Honkasalo	August 26, 1941	Turku	Y. Väisälä	·	8.3 km (5.2 mi)	MPC · JPL
1700 Zvezdara	1940 QC	Zvezdara	August 26, 1940	Belgrade	P. Đurković	·	20 km (12 mi)	MPC · JPL

== 1701–1800 ==
back to top

Designation			Discovery			Properties		Ref
Permanent	Provisional	Named after	Date	Site	Discoverer(s)	Category	Diam.	Ref
1701 Okavango	1953 NJ	Okavango	July 6, 1953	Johannesburg	J. Churms	·	19 km (12 mi)	MPC · JPL
1702 Kalahari	A924 NC	Kalahari	July 7, 1924	Johannesburg	E. Hertzsprung	·	35 km (22 mi)	MPC · JPL
1703 Barry	1930 RB	Barry	September 2, 1930	Heidelberg	M. F. Wolf	slow	9.2 km (5.7 mi)	MPC · JPL
1704 Wachmann	A924 EE	Wachmann	March 7, 1924	Heidelberg	K. Reinmuth	·	6.6 km (4.1 mi)	MPC · JPL
1705 Tapio	1941 SL_{1}	Tapio	September 26, 1941	Turku	L. Oterma	·	12 km (7.5 mi)	MPC · JPL
1706 Dieckvoss	1931 TS	Dieckvoss	October 5, 1931	Heidelberg	K. Reinmuth	·	6.1 km (3.8 mi)	MPC · JPL
1707 Chantal	1932 RL	Chantal	September 8, 1932	Uccle	E. Delporte	·	7.5 km (4.7 mi)	MPC · JPL
1708 Pólit	1929 XA	Pólit	December 1, 1929	Barcelona	J. Comas i Solà	·	29 km (18 mi)	MPC · JPL
1709 Ukraina	1925 QA	Ukraina	August 16, 1925	Crimea-Simeis	G. Shajn	·	9.4 km (5.8 mi)	MPC · JPL
1710 Gothard	1941 UF	Gothard	October 20, 1941	Konkoly	G. Kulin	·	9.8 km (6.1 mi)	MPC · JPL
1711 Sandrine	1935 BB	Sandrine	January 29, 1935	Uccle	E. Delporte	EOS	23 km (14 mi)	MPC · JPL
1712 Angola	1935 KC	Angola	May 28, 1935	Johannesburg	C. Jackson	·	67 km (42 mi)	MPC · JPL
1713 Bancilhon	1951 SC	Bancilhon	September 27, 1951	Algiers	L. Boyer	·	5.7 km (3.5 mi)	MPC · JPL
1714 Sy	1951 OA	Sy	July 25, 1951	Algiers	L. Boyer	·	14 km (8.7 mi)	MPC · JPL
1715 Salli	1938 GK	Salli	April 9, 1938	Turku	H. Alikoski	·	24 km (15 mi)	MPC · JPL
1716 Peter	1934 GF	Peter	April 4, 1934	Heidelberg	K. Reinmuth	·	27 km (17 mi)	MPC · JPL
1717 Arlon	1954 AC	Arlon	January 8, 1954	Uccle	S. J. Arend	moon	8.5 km (5.3 mi)	MPC · JPL
1718 Namibia	1942 RX	Namibia	September 14, 1942	Turku	M. Väisälä	·	9.7 km (6.0 mi)	MPC · JPL
1719 Jens	1950 DP	Jens	February 17, 1950	Heidelberg	K. Reinmuth	·	20 km (12 mi)	MPC · JPL
1720 Niels	1935 CQ	Niels	February 7, 1935	Heidelberg	K. Reinmuth	slow	6.4 km (4.0 mi)	MPC · JPL
1721 Wells	1953 TD_{3}	Wells	October 3, 1953	Brooklyn	Indiana University	·	44 km (27 mi)	MPC · JPL
1722 Goffin	1938 EG	Goffin	February 23, 1938	Uccle	E. Delporte	·	10 km (6.2 mi)	MPC · JPL
1723 Klemola	1936 FX	Klemola	March 18, 1936	Turku	Y. Väisälä	EOS	33 km (21 mi)	MPC · JPL
1724 Vladimir	1932 DC	Vladimir	February 28, 1932	Uccle	E. Delporte	·	38 km (24 mi)	MPC · JPL
1725 CrAO	1930 SK	CrAO	September 20, 1930	Crimea-Simeis	G. N. Neujmin	KOR	16 km (9.9 mi)	MPC · JPL
1726 Hoffmeister	1933 OE	Hoffmeister	July 24, 1933	Heidelberg	K. Reinmuth	HOF	25 km (16 mi)	MPC · JPL
1727 Mette	1965 BA	Mette	January 25, 1965	Bloemfontein	A. D. Andrews	H · moon	6.8 km (4.2 mi)	MPC · JPL
1728 Goethe Link	1964 TO	Goethe Link	October 12, 1964	Brooklyn	Indiana University	·	15 km (9.3 mi)	MPC · JPL
1729 Beryl	1963 SL	Beryl	September 19, 1963	Brooklyn	Indiana University	·	9.0 km (5.6 mi)	MPC · JPL
1730 Marceline	1936 UA	Marceline	October 17, 1936	Nice	M. Laugier	·	15 km (9.3 mi)	MPC · JPL
1731 Smuts	1948 PH	Smuts	August 9, 1948	Johannesburg	E. L. Johnson	·	55 km (34 mi)	MPC · JPL
1732 Heike	1943 EY	Heike	March 9, 1943	Heidelberg	K. Reinmuth	EOS	22 km (14 mi)	MPC · JPL
1733 Silke	1938 DL_{1}	Silke	February 19, 1938	Heidelberg	A. Bohrmann	·	6.7 km (4.2 mi)	MPC · JPL
1734 Zhongolovich	1928 TJ	Zhongolovich	October 11, 1928	Crimea-Simeis	G. N. Neujmin	DOR	26 km (16 mi)	MPC · JPL
1735 ITA	1948 RJ_{1}	ITA	September 10, 1948	Crimea-Simeis	P. F. Shajn	·	62 km (39 mi)	MPC · JPL
1736 Floirac	1967 RA	Floirac	September 6, 1967	Bordeaux	G. Soulié	·	8.6 km (5.3 mi)	MPC · JPL
1737 Severny	1966 TJ	Severny	October 13, 1966	Nauchnij	L. I. Chernykh	EOS	21 km (13 mi)	MPC · JPL
1738 Oosterhoff	1930 SP	Oosterhoff	September 16, 1930	Johannesburg	H. van Gent	·	7.9 km (4.9 mi)	MPC · JPL
1739 Meyermann	1939 PF	Meyermann	August 15, 1939	Heidelberg	K. Reinmuth	·	7.9 km (4.9 mi)	MPC · JPL
1740 Paavo Nurmi	1939 UA	Paavo Nurmi	October 18, 1939	Turku	Y. Väisälä	·	13 km (8.1 mi)	MPC · JPL
1741 Giclas	1960 BC	Giclas	January 26, 1960	Brooklyn	Indiana University	KOR	13 km (8.1 mi)	MPC · JPL
1742 Schaifers	1934 RO	Schaifers	September 7, 1934	Heidelberg	K. Reinmuth	KOR	17 km (11 mi)	MPC · JPL
1743 Schmidt	4109 P-L	Schmidt	September 24, 1960	Palomar	C. J. van Houten, I. van Houten-Groeneveld, T. Gehrels	·	19 km (12 mi)	MPC · JPL
1744 Harriet	6557 P-L	Harriet	September 24, 1960	Palomar	C. J. van Houten, I. van Houten-Groeneveld, T. Gehrels	slow	5.0 km (3.1 mi)	MPC · JPL
1745 Ferguson	1941 SY_{1}	Ferguson	September 17, 1941	Washington	Willis, J.	KOR	12 km (7.5 mi)	MPC · JPL
1746 Brouwer	1963 RF	Brouwer	September 14, 1963	Brooklyn	Indiana University	HIL · 3:2	63 km (39 mi)	MPC · JPL
1747 Wright	1947 NH	Wright	July 14, 1947	Mount Hamilton	C. A. Wirtanen	·	6.4 km (4.0 mi)	MPC · JPL
1748 Mauderli	1966 RA	Mauderli	September 7, 1966	Zimmerwald	P. Wild	3:2	45 km (28 mi)	MPC · JPL
1749 Telamon	1949 SB	Telamon	September 23, 1949	Heidelberg	K. Reinmuth	L4	65 km (40 mi)	MPC · JPL
1750 Eckert	1950 NA_{1}	Eckert	July 15, 1950	Heidelberg	K. Reinmuth	H · slow	4.1 km (2.5 mi)	MPC · JPL
1751 Herget	1955 OC	Herget	July 27, 1955	Brooklyn	Indiana University	GEF	11 km (6.8 mi)	MPC · JPL
1752 van Herk	1930 OK	van Herk	July 22, 1930	Johannesburg	H. van Gent	·	4.6 km (2.9 mi)	MPC · JPL
1753 Mieke	1934 JM	Mieke	May 10, 1934	Johannesburg	H. van Gent	EOS	19 km (12 mi)	MPC · JPL
1754 Cunningham	1935 FE	Cunningham	March 29, 1935	Uccle	E. Delporte	3:2	80 km (50 mi)	MPC · JPL
1755 Lorbach	1936 VD	Lorbach	November 8, 1936	Nice	M. Laugier	EOS	25 km (16 mi)	MPC · JPL
1756 Giacobini	1937 YA	Giacobini	December 24, 1937	Nice	A. Patry	·	10 km (6.2 mi)	MPC · JPL
1757 Porvoo	1939 FC	Porvoo	March 17, 1939	Turku	Y. Väisälä	·	10 km (6.2 mi)	MPC · JPL
1758 Naantali	1942 DK	Naantali	February 18, 1942	Turku	L. Oterma	EOS	20 km (12 mi)	MPC · JPL
1759 Kienle	1942 RF	Kienle	September 11, 1942	Heidelberg	K. Reinmuth	·	7.3 km (4.5 mi)	MPC · JPL
1760 Sandra	1950 GB	Sandra	April 10, 1950	Johannesburg	E. L. Johnson	·	35 km (22 mi)	MPC · JPL
1761 Edmondson	1952 FN	Edmondson	March 30, 1952	Brooklyn	Indiana University	·	20 km (12 mi)	MPC · JPL
1762 Russell	1953 TZ	Russell	October 8, 1953	Brooklyn	Indiana University	KOR ·	17 km (11 mi)	MPC · JPL
1763 Williams	1953 TN_{2}	Williams	October 13, 1953	Brooklyn	Indiana University	·	7.0 km (4.3 mi)	MPC · JPL
1764 Cogshall	1953 VM_{1}	Cogshall	November 7, 1953	Brooklyn	Indiana University	THM	27 km (17 mi)	MPC · JPL
1765 Wrubel	1957 XB	Wrubel	December 15, 1957	Brooklyn	Indiana University	·	38 km (24 mi)	MPC · JPL
1766 Slipher	1962 RF	Slipher	September 7, 1962	Brooklyn	Indiana University	PAD	19 km (12 mi)	MPC · JPL
1767 Lampland	1962 RJ	Lampland	September 7, 1962	Brooklyn	Indiana University	EOS	15 km (9.3 mi)	MPC · JPL
1768 Appenzella	1965 SA	Appenzella	September 23, 1965	Zimmerwald	P. Wild	NYS	20 km (12 mi)	MPC · JPL
1769 Carlostorres	1966 QP	Carlostorres	August 25, 1966	Córdoba	Pereyra, Z.	·	5.6 km (3.5 mi)	MPC · JPL
1770 Schlesinger	1967 JR	Schlesinger	May 10, 1967	El Leoncito	C. U. Cesco, A. R. Klemola	moon	11 km (6.8 mi)	MPC · JPL
1771 Makover	1968 BD	Makover	January 24, 1968	Nauchnij	L. I. Chernykh	·	47 km (29 mi)	MPC · JPL
1772 Gagarin	1968 CB	Gagarin	February 6, 1968	Nauchnij	L. I. Chernykh	·	9.6 km (6.0 mi)	MPC · JPL
1773 Rumpelstilz	1968 HE	Rumpelstilz	April 17, 1968	Zimmerwald	P. Wild	slow	7.1 km (4.4 mi)	MPC · JPL
1774 Kulikov	1968 UG_{1}	Kulikov	October 22, 1968	Nauchnij	T. M. Smirnova	KOR	11 km (6.8 mi)	MPC · JPL
1775 Zimmerwald	1969 JA	Zimmerwald	May 13, 1969	Zimmerwald	P. Wild	EUN · slow	10 km (6.2 mi)	MPC · JPL
1776 Kuiper	2520 P-L	Kuiper	September 24, 1960	Palomar	C. J. van Houten, I. van Houten-Groeneveld, T. Gehrels	·	40 km (25 mi)	MPC · JPL
1777 Gehrels	4007 P-L	Gehrels	September 24, 1960	Palomar	C. J. van Houten, I. van Houten-Groeneveld, T. Gehrels	·	12 km (7.5 mi)	MPC · JPL
1778 Alfvén	4506 P-L	Alfvén	September 26, 1960	Palomar	C. J. van Houten, I. van Houten-Groeneveld, T. Gehrels	THM	21 km (13 mi)	MPC · JPL
1779 Paraná	1950 LZ	Paraná	June 15, 1950	La Plata Observatory	M. Itzigsohn	·	4.1 km (2.5 mi)	MPC · JPL
1780 Kippes	A906 RA	Kippes	September 12, 1906	Heidelberg	A. Kopff	EOS	28 km (17 mi)	MPC · JPL
1781 Van Biesbroeck	A906 UB	Van Biesbroeck	October 17, 1906	Heidelberg	A. Kopff	·	8.5 km (5.3 mi)	MPC · JPL
1782 Schneller	1931 TL_{1}	Schneller	October 6, 1931	Heidelberg	K. Reinmuth	THM	22 km (14 mi)	MPC · JPL
1783 Albitskij	1935 FJ	Albitskij	March 24, 1935	Crimea-Simeis	G. N. Neujmin	ADE	24 km (15 mi)	MPC · JPL
1784 Benguella	1935 MG	Benguella	June 30, 1935	Johannesburg	C. Jackson	·	10 km (6.2 mi)	MPC · JPL
1785 Wurm	1941 CD	Wurm	February 15, 1941	Heidelberg	K. Reinmuth	·	8.8 km (5.5 mi)	MPC · JPL
1786 Raahe	1948 TL	Raahe	October 9, 1948	Turku	H. Alikoski	EOS ·	26 km (16 mi)	MPC · JPL
1787 Chiny	1950 SK	Chiny	September 19, 1950	Uccle	S. J. Arend	EOS ·	20 km (12 mi)	MPC · JPL
1788 Kiess	1952 OZ	Kiess	July 25, 1952	Brooklyn	Indiana University	THM	21 km (13 mi)	MPC · JPL
1789 Dobrovolsky	1966 QC	Dobrovolsky	August 19, 1966	Nauchnij	L. I. Chernykh	·	7.9 km (4.9 mi)	MPC · JPL
1790 Volkov	1967 ER	Volkov	March 9, 1967	Nauchnij	L. I. Chernykh	·	7.1 km (4.4 mi)	MPC · JPL
1791 Patsayev	1967 RE	Patsayev	September 4, 1967	Nauchnij	T. M. Smirnova	·	29 km (18 mi)	MPC · JPL
1792 Reni	1968 BG	Reni	January 24, 1968	Nauchnij	L. I. Chernykh	·	24 km (15 mi)	MPC · JPL
1793 Zoya	1968 DW	Zoya	February 28, 1968	Nauchnij	T. M. Smirnova	·	8.3 km (5.2 mi)	MPC · JPL
1794 Finsen	1970 GA	Finsen	April 7, 1970	Hartbeespoort	Bruwer, J. A.	·	38 km (24 mi)	MPC · JPL
1795 Woltjer	4010 P-L	Woltjer	September 24, 1960	Palomar	C. J. van Houten, I. van Houten-Groeneveld, T. Gehrels	DOR	24 km (15 mi)	MPC · JPL
1796 Riga	1966 KB	Riga	May 16, 1966	Nauchnij	N. S. Chernykh	CYB	68 km (42 mi)	MPC · JPL
1797 Schaumasse	1936 VH	Schaumasse	November 15, 1936	Nice	A. Patry	·	9.1 km (5.7 mi)	MPC · JPL
1798 Watts	1949 GC	Watts	April 4, 1949	Brooklyn	Indiana University	moon	6.6 km (4.1 mi)	MPC · JPL
1799 Koussevitzky	1950 OE	Koussevitzky	July 25, 1950	Brooklyn	Indiana University	EOS	18 km (11 mi)	MPC · JPL
1800 Aguilar	1950 RJ	Aguilar	September 12, 1950	La Plata Observatory	M. Itzigsohn	·	7.4 km (4.6 mi)	MPC · JPL

== 1801–1900 ==
back to top

Designation			Discovery			Properties		Ref
Permanent	Provisional	Named after	Date	Site	Discoverer(s)	Category	Diam.	Ref
1801 Titicaca	1952 SP_{1}	Titicaca	September 23, 1952	La Plata Observatory	M. Itzigsohn	EOS	22 km (14 mi)	MPC · JPL
1802 Zhang Heng	1964 TW_{1}	Zhang Heng	October 9, 1964	Nanjing	Purple Mountain	KOR	13 km (8.1 mi)	MPC · JPL
1803 Zwicky	1967 CA	Zwicky	February 6, 1967	Zimmerwald	P. Wild	PHO · moon	9.9 km (6.2 mi)	MPC · JPL
1804 Chebotarev	1967 GG	Chebotarev	April 6, 1967	Nauchnij	T. M. Smirnova	·	9.1 km (5.7 mi)	MPC · JPL
1805 Dirikis	1970 GD	Dirikis	April 1, 1970	Nauchnij	L. I. Chernykh	THM	28 km (17 mi)	MPC · JPL
1806 Derice	1971 LC	Derice	June 13, 1971	Bickley	Perth Observatory	·	8.0 km (5.0 mi)	MPC · JPL
1807 Slovakia	1971 QA	Slovakia	August 20, 1971	Skalnaté Pleso	M. Antal	slow	9.1 km (5.7 mi)	MPC · JPL
1808 Bellerophon	2517 P-L	Bellerophon	September 24, 1960	Palomar	C. J. van Houten, I. van Houten-Groeneveld, T. Gehrels	·	15 km (9.3 mi)	MPC · JPL
1809 Prometheus	2522 P-L	Prometheus	September 24, 1960	Palomar	C. J. van Houten, I. van Houten-Groeneveld, T. Gehrels	KOR ·	14 km (8.7 mi)	MPC · JPL
1810 Epimetheus	4196 P-L	Epimetheus	September 24, 1960	Palomar	C. J. van Houten, I. van Houten-Groeneveld, T. Gehrels	·	7.7 km (4.8 mi)	MPC · JPL
1811 Bruwer	4576 P-L	Bruwer	September 24, 1960	Palomar	C. J. van Houten, I. van Houten-Groeneveld, T. Gehrels	·	28 km (17 mi)	MPC · JPL
1812 Gilgamesh	4645 P-L	Gilgamesh	September 24, 1960	Palomar	C. J. van Houten, I. van Houten-Groeneveld, T. Gehrels	EOS	15 km (9.3 mi)	MPC · JPL
1813 Imhotep	7589 P-L	Imhotep	October 17, 1960	Palomar	C. J. van Houten, I. van Houten-Groeneveld, T. Gehrels	·	19 km (12 mi)	MPC · JPL
1814 Bach	1931 TW_{1}	Bach	October 9, 1931	Heidelberg	K. Reinmuth	·	7.5 km (4.7 mi)	MPC · JPL
1815 Beethoven	1932 CE_{1}	Beethoven	January 27, 1932	Heidelberg	K. Reinmuth	·	31 km (19 mi)	MPC · JPL
1816 Liberia	1936 BD	Liberia	January 29, 1936	Johannesburg	C. Jackson	PHO	9.8 km (6.1 mi)	MPC · JPL
1817 Katanga	1939 MB	Katanga	June 20, 1939	Johannesburg	C. Jackson	PHO	16 km (9.9 mi)	MPC · JPL
1818 Brahms	1939 PE	Brahms	August 15, 1939	Heidelberg	K. Reinmuth	·	14 km (8.7 mi)	MPC · JPL
1819 Laputa	1948 PC	Laputa	August 9, 1948	Johannesburg	E. L. Johnson	·	54 km (34 mi)	MPC · JPL
1820 Lohmann	1949 PO	Lohmann	August 2, 1949	Heidelberg	K. Reinmuth	·	5.3 km (3.3 mi)	MPC · JPL
1821 Aconcagua	1950 MB	Aconcagua	June 24, 1950	La Plata Observatory	M. Itzigsohn	·	9.5 km (5.9 mi)	MPC · JPL
1822 Waterman	1950 OO	Waterman	July 25, 1950	Brooklyn	Indiana University	·	6.1 km (3.8 mi)	MPC · JPL
1823 Gliese	1951 RD	Gliese	September 4, 1951	Heidelberg	K. Reinmuth	·	8.4 km (5.2 mi)	MPC · JPL
1824 Haworth	1952 FM	Haworth	March 30, 1952	Brooklyn	Indiana University	KOR	14 km (8.7 mi)	MPC · JPL
1825 Klare	1954 QH	Klare	August 31, 1954	Heidelberg	K. Reinmuth	·	20 km (12 mi)	MPC · JPL
1826 Miller	1955 RC_{1}	Miller	September 14, 1955	Brooklyn	Indiana University	EOS	23 km (14 mi)	MPC · JPL
1827 Atkinson	1962 RK	Atkinson	September 7, 1962	Brooklyn	Indiana University	·	8.9 km (5.5 mi)	MPC · JPL
1828 Kashirina	1966 PH	Kashirina	August 14, 1966	Nauchnij	L. I. Chernykh	·	27 km (17 mi)	MPC · JPL
1829 Dawson	1967 JJ	Dawson	May 6, 1967	El Leoncito	C. U. Cesco, A. R. Klemola	·	8.1 km (5.0 mi)	MPC · JPL
1830 Pogson	1968 HA	Pogson	April 17, 1968	Zimmerwald	P. Wild	(254) · moon	7.7 km (4.8 mi)	MPC · JPL
1831 Nicholson	1968 HC	Nicholson	April 17, 1968	Zimmerwald	P. Wild	·	8.1 km (5.0 mi)	MPC · JPL
1832 Mrkos	1969 PC	Mrkos	August 11, 1969	Nauchnij	L. I. Chernykh	URS	29 km (18 mi)	MPC · JPL
1833 Shmakova	1969 PN	Shmakova	August 11, 1969	Nauchnij	L. I. Chernykh	·	17 km (11 mi)	MPC · JPL
1834 Palach	1969 QP	Palach	August 22, 1969	Hamburg-Bergedorf	L. Kohoutek	EOS	17 km (11 mi)	MPC · JPL
1835 Gajdariya	1970 OE	Gajdariya	July 30, 1970	Nauchnij	T. M. Smirnova	KOR	13 km (8.1 mi)	MPC · JPL
1836 Komarov	1971 OT	Komarov	July 26, 1971	Nauchnij	N. S. Chernykh	DOR	22 km (14 mi)	MPC · JPL
1837 Osita	1971 QZ_{1}	Osita	August 16, 1971	El Leoncito	Gibson, J.	·	7.5 km (4.7 mi)	MPC · JPL
1838 Ursa	1971 UC	Ursa	October 20, 1971	Zimmerwald	P. Wild	·	40 km (25 mi)	MPC · JPL
1839 Ragazza	1971 UF	Ragazza	October 20, 1971	Zimmerwald	P. Wild	GEF · slow	8.8 km (5.5 mi)	MPC · JPL
1840 Hus	1971 UY	Hus	October 26, 1971	Hamburg-Bergedorf	L. Kohoutek	KOR	12 km (7.5 mi)	MPC · JPL
1841 Masaryk	1971 UO_{1}	Masaryk	October 26, 1971	Hamburg-Bergedorf	L. Kohoutek	CYB	40 km (25 mi)	MPC · JPL
1842 Hynek	1972 AA	Hynek	January 14, 1972	Hamburg-Bergedorf	L. Kohoutek	·	8.0 km (5.0 mi)	MPC · JPL
1843 Jarmila	1972 AB	Jarmila	January 14, 1972	Hamburg-Bergedorf	L. Kohoutek	·	29 km (18 mi)	MPC · JPL
1844 Susilva	1972 UB	Susilva	October 30, 1972	Zimmerwald	P. Wild	EOS	27 km (17 mi)	MPC · JPL
1845 Helewalda	1972 UC	Helewalda	October 30, 1972	Zimmerwald	P. Wild	EOS	20 km (12 mi)	MPC · JPL
1846 Bengt	6553 P-L	Bengt	September 24, 1960	Palomar	C. J. van Houten, I. van Houten-Groeneveld, T. Gehrels	·	11 km (6.8 mi)	MPC · JPL
1847 Stobbe	A916 CA	Stobbe	February 1, 1916	Hamburg-Bergedorf	H. Thiele	·	17 km (11 mi)	MPC · JPL
1848 Delvaux	1933 QD	Delvaux	August 18, 1933	Uccle	E. Delporte	KOR	17 km (11 mi)	MPC · JPL
1849 Kresák	1942 AB	Kresák	January 14, 1942	Heidelberg	K. Reinmuth	EOS	22 km (14 mi)	MPC · JPL
1850 Kohoutek	1942 EN	Kohoutek	March 23, 1942	Heidelberg	K. Reinmuth	·	7.6 km (4.7 mi)	MPC · JPL
1851 Lacroute	1950 VA	Lacroute	November 9, 1950	Algiers	L. Boyer	THM	17 km (11 mi)	MPC · JPL
1852 Carpenter	1955 GA	Carpenter	April 1, 1955	Brooklyn	Indiana University	EOS	21 km (13 mi)	MPC · JPL
1853 McElroy	1957 XE	McElroy	December 15, 1957	Brooklyn	Indiana University	·	24 km (15 mi)	MPC · JPL
1854 Skvortsov	1968 UE_{1}	Skvortsov	October 22, 1968	Nauchnij	T. M. Smirnova	·	9.6 km (6.0 mi)	MPC · JPL
1855 Korolev	1969 TU_{1}	Korolev	October 8, 1969	Nauchnij	L. I. Chernykh	·	6.8 km (4.2 mi)	MPC · JPL
1856 Růžena	1969 TW_{1}	Růžena	October 8, 1969	Nauchnij	L. I. Chernykh	·	6.6 km (4.1 mi)	MPC · JPL
1857 Parchomenko	1971 QS_{1}	Parchomenko	August 30, 1971	Nauchnij	T. M. Smirnova	·	8.0 km (5.0 mi)	MPC · JPL
1858 Lobachevskij	1972 QL	Lobachevskij	August 18, 1972	Nauchnij	L. V. Zhuravleva	·	11 km (6.8 mi)	MPC · JPL
1859 Kovalevskaya	1972 RS_{2}	Kovalevskaya	September 4, 1972	Nauchnij	L. V. Zhuravleva	·	45 km (28 mi)	MPC · JPL
1860 Barbarossa	1973 SK	Barbarossa	September 28, 1973	Zimmerwald	P. Wild	·	17 km (11 mi)	MPC · JPL
1861 Komenský	1970 WB	Komenský	November 24, 1970	Hamburg-Bergedorf	L. Kohoutek	EOS	15 km (9.3 mi)	MPC · JPL
1862 Apollo	1932 HA	Apollo	April 24, 1932	Heidelberg	K. Reinmuth	APO +1 km (0.62 mi) · PHA · moon	1.5 km (0.93 mi)	MPC · JPL
1863 Antinous	1948 EA	Antinous	March 7, 1948	Mount Hamilton	C. A. Wirtanen	APO +1 km (0.62 mi)	2.1 km (1.3 mi)	MPC · JPL
1864 Daedalus	1971 FA	Daedalus	March 24, 1971	Palomar	T. Gehrels	APO +1 km (0.62 mi)	3.7 km (2.3 mi)	MPC · JPL
1865 Cerberus	1971 UA	Cerberus	October 26, 1971	Hamburg-Bergedorf	L. Kohoutek	APO +1 km (0.62 mi)	1.2 km (0.75 mi)	MPC · JPL
1866 Sisyphus	1972 XA	Sisyphus	December 5, 1972	Zimmerwald	P. Wild	APO +1 km (0.62 mi) · moon	8.5 km (5.3 mi)	MPC · JPL
1867 Deiphobus	1971 EA	Deiphobus	March 3, 1971	El Leoncito	C. U. Cesco	L5	118 km (73 mi)	MPC · JPL
1868 Thersites	2008 P-L	Thersites	September 24, 1960	Palomar	C. J. van Houten, I. van Houten-Groeneveld, T. Gehrels	L4	68 km (42 mi)	MPC · JPL
1869 Philoctetes	4596 P-L	Philoctetes	September 24, 1960	Palomar	C. J. van Houten, I. van Houten-Groeneveld, T. Gehrels	L4	23 km (14 mi)	MPC · JPL
1870 Glaukos	1971 FE	Glaukos	March 24, 1971	Palomar	C. J. van Houten, I. van Houten-Groeneveld, T. Gehrels	L5	48 km (30 mi)	MPC · JPL
1871 Astyanax	1971 FF	Astyanax	March 24, 1971	Palomar	C. J. van Houten, I. van Houten-Groeneveld, T. Gehrels	L5	28 km (17 mi)	MPC · JPL
1872 Helenos	1971 FG	Helenos	March 24, 1971	Palomar	C. J. van Houten, I. van Houten-Groeneveld, T. Gehrels	L5	34 km (21 mi)	MPC · JPL
1873 Agenor	1971 FH	Agenor	March 25, 1971	Palomar	C. J. van Houten, I. van Houten-Groeneveld, T. Gehrels	L5	51 km (32 mi)	MPC · JPL
1874 Kacivelia	A924 RC	Kacivelia	September 5, 1924	Crimea-Simeis	S. Belyavsky	·	21 km (13 mi)	MPC · JPL
1875 Neruda	1969 QQ	Neruda	August 22, 1969	Hamburg-Bergedorf	L. Kohoutek	·	19 km (12 mi)	MPC · JPL
1876 Napolitania	1970 BA	Napolitania	January 31, 1970	Palomar	C. T. Kowal	H	2.2 km (1.4 mi)	MPC · JPL
1877 Marsden	1971 FC	Marsden	March 24, 1971	Palomar	T. Gehrels	T_{j} (2.94) · 3:2	36 km (22 mi)	MPC · JPL
1878 Hughes	1933 QC	Hughes	August 18, 1933	Uccle	E. Delporte	KOR	12 km (7.5 mi)	MPC · JPL
1879 Broederstroom	1935 UN	Broederstroom	October 16, 1935	Johannesburg	H. van Gent	moon	7.4 km (4.6 mi)	MPC · JPL
1880 McCrosky	1940 AN	McCrosky	January 13, 1940	Heidelberg	K. Reinmuth	·	15 km (9.3 mi)	MPC · JPL
1881 Shao	1940 PC	Shao	August 3, 1940	Heidelberg	K. Reinmuth	·	24 km (15 mi)	MPC · JPL
1882 Rauma	1941 UJ	Rauma	October 15, 1941	Turku	L. Oterma	EOS	18 km (11 mi)	MPC · JPL
1883 Rimito	1942 XA	Rimito	December 4, 1942	Turku	Y. Väisälä	·	5.7 km (3.5 mi)	MPC · JPL
1884 Skip	1943 EB_{1}	Skip	March 2, 1943	Nice	M. Laugier	·	8.4 km (5.2 mi)	MPC · JPL
1885 Herero	1948 PJ	Herero	August 9, 1948	Johannesburg	E. L. Johnson	·	4.7 km (2.9 mi)	MPC · JPL
1886 Lowell	1949 MP	Lowell	June 21, 1949	Flagstaff	H. L. Giclas	EUN · slow	10 km (6.2 mi)	MPC · JPL
1887 Virton	1950 TD	Virton	October 5, 1950	Uccle	S. J. Arend	EOS	21 km (13 mi)	MPC · JPL
1888 Zu Chong-Zhi	1964 VO_{1}	Zu Chong-Zhi	November 9, 1964	Nanjing	Purple Mountain	(5)	12 km (7.5 mi)	MPC · JPL
1889 Pakhmutova	1968 BE	Pakhmutova	January 24, 1968	Nauchnij	L. I. Chernykh	·	35 km (22 mi)	MPC · JPL
1890 Konoshenkova	1968 CD	Konoshenkova	February 6, 1968	Nauchnij	L. I. Chernykh	·	26 km (16 mi)	MPC · JPL
1891 Gondola	1969 RA	Gondola	September 11, 1969	Zimmerwald	P. Wild	·	12 km (7.5 mi)	MPC · JPL
1892 Lucienne	1971 SD	Lucienne	September 16, 1971	Zimmerwald	P. Wild	PHO	9.7 km (6.0 mi)	MPC · JPL
1893 Jakoba	1971 UD	Jakoba	October 20, 1971	Zimmerwald	P. Wild	·	13 km (8.1 mi)	MPC · JPL
1894 Haffner	1971 UH	Haffner	October 26, 1971	Hamburg-Bergedorf	L. Kohoutek	KOR	11 km (6.8 mi)	MPC · JPL
1895 Larink	1971 UZ	Larink	October 26, 1971	Hamburg-Bergedorf	L. Kohoutek	THM	20 km (12 mi)	MPC · JPL
1896 Beer	1971 UC_{1}	Beer	October 26, 1971	Hamburg-Bergedorf	L. Kohoutek	NYS	5.4 km (3.4 mi)	MPC · JPL
1897 Hind	1971 UE_{1}	Hind	October 26, 1971	Hamburg-Bergedorf	L. Kohoutek	·	5.0 km (3.1 mi)	MPC · JPL
1898 Cowell	1971 UF_{1}	Cowell	October 26, 1971	Hamburg-Bergedorf	L. Kohoutek	THM	15 km (9.3 mi)	MPC · JPL
1899 Crommelin	1971 UR_{1}	Crommelin	October 26, 1971	Hamburg-Bergedorf	L. Kohoutek	·	5.3 km (3.3 mi)	MPC · JPL
1900 Katyusha	1971 YB	Katyusha	December 16, 1971	Nauchnij	T. M. Smirnova	·	8.8 km (5.5 mi)	MPC · JPL

== 1901–2000 ==
back to top

Designation			Discovery			Properties		Ref
Permanent	Provisional	Named after	Date	Site	Discoverer(s)	Category	Diam.	Ref
1901 Moravia	1972 AD	Moravia	January 14, 1972	Hamburg-Bergedorf	L. Kohoutek	·	28 km (17 mi)	MPC · JPL
1902 Shaposhnikov	1972 HU	Shaposhnikov	April 18, 1972	Nauchnij	T. M. Smirnova	T_{j} (2.98) · 3:2	83 km (52 mi)	MPC · JPL
1903 Adzhimushkaj	1972 JL	Adzhimushkaj	May 9, 1972	Nauchnij	T. M. Smirnova	EOS · slow	28 km (17 mi)	MPC · JPL
1904 Massevitch	1972 JM	Massevitch	May 9, 1972	Nauchnij	T. M. Smirnova	·	14 km (8.7 mi)	MPC · JPL
1905 Ambartsumian	1972 JZ	Ambartsumian	May 14, 1972	Nauchnij	T. M. Smirnova	·	8.0 km (5.0 mi)	MPC · JPL
1906 Naef	1972 RC	Naef	September 5, 1972	Zimmerwald	P. Wild	V	7.9 km (4.9 mi)	MPC · JPL
1907 Rudneva	1972 RC_{2}	Rudneva	September 11, 1972	Nauchnij	N. S. Chernykh	·	11 km (6.8 mi)	MPC · JPL
1908 Pobeda	1972 RL_{2}	Pobeda	September 11, 1972	Nauchnij	N. S. Chernykh	slow	18 km (11 mi)	MPC · JPL
1909 Alekhin	1972 RW_{2}	Alekhin	September 4, 1972	Nauchnij	L. V. Zhuravleva	slow	19 km (12 mi)	MPC · JPL
1910 Mikhailov	1972 TZ_{1}	Mikhailov	October 8, 1972	Nauchnij	L. V. Zhuravleva	EOS	37 km (23 mi)	MPC · JPL
1911 Schubart	1973 UD	Schubart	October 25, 1973	Zimmerwald	P. Wild	3:2 · SHU	67 km (42 mi)	MPC · JPL
1912 Anubis	6534 P-L	Anubis	September 24, 1960	Palomar	C. J. van Houten, I. van Houten-Groeneveld, T. Gehrels	KOR	10 km (6.2 mi)	MPC · JPL
1913 Sekanina	1928 SF	Sekanina	September 22, 1928	Heidelberg	K. Reinmuth	KOR	13 km (8.1 mi)	MPC · JPL
1914 Hartbeespoortdam	1930 SB_{1}	Hartbeespoortdam	September 28, 1930	Johannesburg	H. van Gent	·	9.6 km (6.0 mi)	MPC · JPL
1915 Quetzálcoatl	1953 EA	Quetzálcoatl	March 9, 1953	Palomar	A. G. Wilson	AMO · (887)	500 m (1,600 ft)	MPC · JPL
1916 Boreas	1953 RA	Boreas	September 1, 1953	Uccle	S. J. Arend	AMO +1 km (0.62 mi)	3.5 km (2.2 mi)	MPC · JPL
1917 Cuyo	1968 AA	Cuyo	January 1, 1968	El Leoncito	C. U. Cesco, Samuel, A. G.	AMO +1 km (0.62 mi)	5.7 km (3.5 mi)	MPC · JPL
1918 Aiguillon	1968 UA	Aiguillon	October 19, 1968	Bordeaux	G. Soulié	·	20 km (12 mi)	MPC · JPL
1919 Clemence	1971 SA	Clemence	September 16, 1971	El Leoncito	Gibson, J., C. U. Cesco	H	3.3 km (2.1 mi)	MPC · JPL
1920 Sarmiento	1971 VO	Sarmiento	November 11, 1971	El Leoncito	Gibson, J., C. U. Cesco	H	2.9 km (1.8 mi)	MPC · JPL
1921 Pala	1973 SE	Pala	September 20, 1973	Palomar	T. Gehrels	T_{j} (2.96) · CYB · 2:1J (unstable)	6.0 km (3.7 mi)	MPC · JPL
1922 Zulu	1949 HC	Zulu	April 25, 1949	Johannesburg	E. L. Johnson	T_{j} (2.73) · 2:1J (unstable)	21 km (13 mi)	MPC · JPL
1923 Osiris	4011 P-L	Osiris	September 24, 1960	Palomar	C. J. van Houten, I. van Houten-Groeneveld, T. Gehrels	·	13 km (8.1 mi)	MPC · JPL
1924 Horus	4023 P-L	Horus	September 24, 1960	Palomar	C. J. van Houten, I. van Houten-Groeneveld, T. Gehrels	·	13 km (8.1 mi)	MPC · JPL
1925 Franklin-Adams	1934 RY	Franklin-Adams	September 9, 1934	Johannesburg	H. van Gent	·	8.9 km (5.5 mi)	MPC · JPL
1926 Demiddelaer	1935 JA	Demiddelaer	May 2, 1935	Uccle	E. Delporte	EUN ·	18 km (11 mi)	MPC · JPL
1927 Suvanto	1936 FP	Suvanto	March 18, 1936	Turku	R. Suvanto	EUN	12 km (7.5 mi)	MPC · JPL
1928 Summa	1938 SO	Summa	September 21, 1938	Turku	Y. Väisälä	·	9.3 km (5.8 mi)	MPC · JPL
1929 Kollaa	1939 BS	Kollaa	January 20, 1939	Turku	Y. Väisälä	·	7.8 km (4.8 mi)	MPC · JPL
1930 Lucifer	1964 UA	Lucifer	October 29, 1964	USNO Flagstaff	E. Roemer	·	34 km (21 mi)	MPC · JPL
1931 Čapek	1969 QB	Čapek	August 22, 1969	Hamburg-Bergedorf	L. Kohoutek	slow	6.6 km (4.1 mi)	MPC · JPL
1932 Jansky	1971 UB_{1}	Jansky	October 26, 1971	Hamburg-Bergedorf	L. Kohoutek	NYS	5.4 km (3.4 mi)	MPC · JPL
1933 Tinchen	1972 AC	Tinchen	January 14, 1972	Hamburg-Bergedorf	L. Kohoutek	V	4.5 km (2.8 mi)	MPC · JPL
1934 Jeffers	1972 XB	Jeffers	December 2, 1972	Mount Hamilton	A. R. Klemola	moon	9.2 km (5.7 mi)	MPC · JPL
1935 Lucerna	1973 RB	Lucerna	September 2, 1973	Zimmerwald	P. Wild	·	6.4 km (4.0 mi)	MPC · JPL
1936 Lugano	1973 WD	Lugano	November 24, 1973	Zimmerwald	P. Wild	ADE	34 km (21 mi)	MPC · JPL
1937 Locarno	1973 YA	Locarno	December 19, 1973	Zimmerwald	P. Wild	PHO · slow	13 km (8.1 mi)	MPC · JPL
1938 Lausanna	1974 HC	Lausanna	April 19, 1974	Zimmerwald	P. Wild	·	7.6 km (4.7 mi)	MPC · JPL
1939 Loretta	1974 UC	Loretta	October 17, 1974	Palomar	C. T. Kowal	THM ·	30 km (19 mi)	MPC · JPL
1940 Whipple	1975 CA	Whipple	February 2, 1975	Harvard Observatory	Harvard Observatory	·	37 km (23 mi)	MPC · JPL
1941 Wild	1931 TN_{1}	Wild	October 6, 1931	Heidelberg	K. Reinmuth	T_{j} (2.98) · 3:2 · SHU	17 km (11 mi)	MPC · JPL
1942 Jablunka	1972 SA	Jablunka	September 30, 1972	Hamburg-Bergedorf	L. Kohoutek	PHO	17 km (11 mi)	MPC · JPL
1943 Anteros	1973 EC	Anteros	March 13, 1973	El Leoncito	Gibson, J.	AMO +1 km (0.62 mi)	2.3 km (1.4 mi)	MPC · JPL
1944 Günter	1925 RA	Günter	September 14, 1925	Heidelberg	K. Reinmuth	·	4.9 km (3.0 mi)	MPC · JPL
1945 Wesselink	1930 OL	Wesselink	July 22, 1930	Johannesburg	H. van Gent	·	7.2 km (4.5 mi)	MPC · JPL
1946 Walraven	1931 PH	Walraven	August 8, 1931	Johannesburg	H. van Gent	·	9.2 km (5.7 mi)	MPC · JPL
1947 Iso-Heikkilä	1935 EA	Iso-Heikkilä	March 4, 1935	Turku	Y. Väisälä	EOS	32 km (20 mi)	MPC · JPL
1948 Kampala	1935 GL	Kampala	April 3, 1935	Johannesburg	C. Jackson	·	8.4 km (5.2 mi)	MPC · JPL
1949 Messina	1936 NE	Messina	July 8, 1936	Johannesburg	C. Jackson	·	3.6 km (2.2 mi)	MPC · JPL
1950 Wempe	1942 EO	Wempe	March 23, 1942	Heidelberg	K. Reinmuth	·	6.3 km (3.9 mi)	MPC · JPL
1951 Lick	1949 OA	Lick	July 26, 1949	Mount Hamilton	C. A. Wirtanen	·	5.6 km (3.5 mi)	MPC · JPL
1952 Hesburgh	1951 JC	Hesburgh	May 3, 1951	Brooklyn	Indiana University	·	38 km (24 mi)	MPC · JPL
1953 Rupertwildt	1951 UK	Rupertwildt	October 29, 1951	Brooklyn	Indiana University	THM	22 km (14 mi)	MPC · JPL
1954 Kukarkin	1952 PH	Kukarkin	August 15, 1952	Crimea-Simeis	P. F. Shajn	slow	14 km (8.7 mi)	MPC · JPL
1955 McMath	1963 SR	McMath	September 22, 1963	Brooklyn	Indiana University	KOR	9.8 km (6.1 mi)	MPC · JPL
1956 Artek	1969 TX_{1}	Artek	October 8, 1969	Nauchnij	L. I. Chernykh	THM	20 km (12 mi)	MPC · JPL
1957 Angara	1970 GF	Angara	April 1, 1970	Nauchnij	L. I. Chernykh	EOS	18 km (11 mi)	MPC · JPL
1958 Chandra	1970 SB	Chandra	September 24, 1970	El Leoncito	C. U. Cesco	·	34 km (21 mi)	MPC · JPL
1959 Karbyshev	1972 NB	Karbyshev	July 14, 1972	Nauchnij	L. V. Zhuravleva	V	6.9 km (4.3 mi)	MPC · JPL
1960 Guisan	1973 UA	Guisan	October 25, 1973	Zimmerwald	P. Wild	·	27 km (17 mi)	MPC · JPL
1961 Dufour	1973 WA	Dufour	November 19, 1973	Zimmerwald	P. Wild	(1298)	50 km (31 mi)	MPC · JPL
1962 Dunant	1973 WE	Dunant	November 24, 1973	Zimmerwald	P. Wild	·	19 km (12 mi)	MPC · JPL
1963 Bezovec	1975 CB	Bezovec	February 9, 1975	Hamburg-Bergedorf	L. Kohoutek	PHO	36 km (22 mi)	MPC · JPL
1964 Luyten	2007 P-L	Luyten	September 24, 1960	Palomar	C. J. van Houten, I. van Houten-Groeneveld, T. Gehrels	·	8.4 km (5.2 mi)	MPC · JPL
1965 van de Kamp	2521 P-L	van de Kamp	September 24, 1960	Palomar	C. J. van Houten, I. van Houten-Groeneveld, T. Gehrels	·	14 km (8.7 mi)	MPC · JPL
1966 Tristan	2552 P-L	Tristan	September 24, 1960	Palomar	C. J. van Houten, I. van Houten-Groeneveld, T. Gehrels	·	8.4 km (5.2 mi)	MPC · JPL
1967 Menzel	A905 VC	Menzel	November 1, 1905	Heidelberg	M. F. Wolf	·	9.6 km (6.0 mi)	MPC · JPL
1968 Mehltretter	1932 BK	Mehltretter	January 29, 1932	Heidelberg	K. Reinmuth	·	13 km (8.1 mi)	MPC · JPL
1969 Alain	1935 CG	Alain	February 3, 1935	Uccle	S. J. Arend	·	23 km (14 mi)	MPC · JPL
1970 Sumeria	1954 ER	Sumeria	March 12, 1954	La Plata Observatory	M. Itzigsohn	DOR	19 km (12 mi)	MPC · JPL
1971 Hagihara	1955 RD_{1}	Hagihara	September 14, 1955	Brooklyn	Indiana University	EOS	12 km (7.5 mi)	MPC · JPL
1972 Yi Xing	1964 VQ_{1}	Yi Xing	November 9, 1964	Nanking	Purple Mountain	·	6.0 km (3.7 mi)	MPC · JPL
1973 Colocolo	1968 OA	Colocolo	July 18, 1968	Cerro El Roble	C. Torres, Cofre, S.	·	26 km (16 mi)	MPC · JPL
1974 Caupolican	1968 OE	Caupolican	July 18, 1968	Cerro El Roble	C. Torres, Cofre, S.	slow	12 km (7.5 mi)	MPC · JPL
1975 Pikelner	1969 PH	Pikelner	August 11, 1969	Nauchnij	L. I. Chernykh	·	15 km (9.3 mi)	MPC · JPL
1976 Kaverin	1970 GC	Kaverin	April 1, 1970	Nauchnij	L. I. Chernykh	·	3.7 km (2.3 mi)	MPC · JPL
1977 Shura	1970 QY	Shura	August 30, 1970	Nauchnij	T. M. Smirnova	·	17 km (11 mi)	MPC · JPL
1978 Patrice	1971 LD	Patrice	June 13, 1971	Bickley	Perth Observatory	·	6.7 km (4.2 mi)	MPC · JPL
1979 Sakharov	2006 P-L	Sakharov	September 24, 1960	Palomar	C. J. van Houten, I. van Houten-Groeneveld, T. Gehrels	V	4.8 km (3.0 mi)	MPC · JPL
1980 Tezcatlipoca	1950 LA	Tezcatlipoca	June 19, 1950	Palomar	A. G. Wilson, Å. A. E. Wallenquist	AMO +1 km (0.62 mi)	4.3 km (2.7 mi)	MPC · JPL
1981 Midas	1973 EA	Midas	March 6, 1973	Palomar	C. T. Kowal	APO +1 km (0.62 mi) · PHA	3.4 km (2.1 mi)	MPC · JPL
1982 Cline	1975 VA	Cline	November 4, 1975	Palomar	E. F. Helin	·	8.1 km (5.0 mi)	MPC · JPL
1983 Bok	1975 LB	Bok	June 9, 1975	Tucson	E. Roemer	·	16 km (9.9 mi)	MPC · JPL
1984 Fedynskij	1926 TN	Fedynskij	October 10, 1926	Crimea-Simeis	S. Belyavsky	·	36 km (22 mi)	MPC · JPL
1985 Hopmann	1929 AE	Hopmann	January 13, 1929	Heidelberg	K. Reinmuth	·	36 km (22 mi)	MPC · JPL
1986 Plaut	1935 SV_{1}	Plaut	September 28, 1935	Johannesburg	H. van Gent	THM	20 km (12 mi)	MPC · JPL
1987 Kaplan	1952 RH	Kaplan	September 11, 1952	Crimea-Simeis	P. F. Shajn	PHO	13 km (8.1 mi)	MPC · JPL
1988 Delores	1952 SV	Delores	September 28, 1952	Brooklyn	Indiana University	·	5.8 km (3.6 mi)	MPC · JPL
1989 Tatry	1955 FG	Tatry	March 20, 1955	Skalnaté Pleso	Paroubek, A., Podstanicka, R.	slow	9.6 km (6.0 mi)	MPC · JPL
1990 Pilcher	1956 EE	Pilcher	March 9, 1956	Heidelberg	K. Reinmuth	moon	6.8 km (4.2 mi)	MPC · JPL
1991 Darwin	1967 JL	Darwin	May 6, 1967	El Leoncito	C. U. Cesco, A. R. Klemola	·	5.0 km (3.1 mi)	MPC · JPL
1992 Galvarino	1968 OD	Galvarino	July 18, 1968	Cerro El Roble	C. Torres, Cofre, S.	EOS	9.6 km (6.0 mi)	MPC · JPL
1993 Guacolda	1968 OH_{1}	Guacolda	July 25, 1968	Cerro El Roble	Plyugin, G. A., Yu. A. Belyaev	·	8.4 km (5.2 mi)	MPC · JPL
1994 Shane	1961 TE	Shane	October 4, 1961	Brooklyn	Indiana University	ADE	25 km (16 mi)	MPC · JPL
1995 Hajek	1971 UP_{1}	Hajek	October 26, 1971	Hamburg-Bergedorf	L. Kohoutek	·	13 km (8.1 mi)	MPC · JPL
1996 Adams	1961 UA	Adams	October 16, 1961	Brooklyn	Indiana University	MAR	12 km (7.5 mi)	MPC · JPL
1997 Leverrier	1963 RC	Leverrier	September 14, 1963	Brooklyn	Indiana University	·	6.8 km (4.2 mi)	MPC · JPL
1998 Titius	1938 DX_{1}	Titius	February 24, 1938	Heidelberg	A. Bohrmann	·	14 km (8.7 mi)	MPC · JPL
1999 Hirayama	1973 DR	Hirayama	February 27, 1973	Hamburg-Bergedorf	L. Kohoutek	·	38 km (24 mi)	MPC · JPL
2000 Herschel	1960 OA	Herschel	July 29, 1960	Sonneberg	J. Schubart	slow	15 km (9.3 mi)	MPC · JPL

back to top

== See also ==
- Meanings of minor-planet names: 1001–2000
