= Comet Väisälä =

Comet Väisälä may refer to any of the four comets discovered by Finnish astronomer, Yrjö Väisälä, below:

- 40P/Väisälä
- 139P/Väisälä–Oterma, co-discovered with Liisi Oterma
- C/1942 EA (Väisälä)
- C/1944 H1 (Väisälä)
