= 1521 Seinäjoki =

Main-belt asteroid

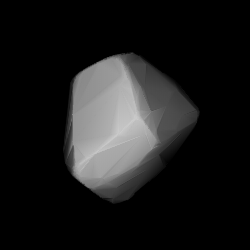
- Shape model of Seinäjoki from its lightcurve

Discovery
- Discovered by: Y. Väisälä
- Discovery site: Turku Obs.
- Discovery date: 22 October 1938

Designations
- Named after: Seinäjoki (Finnish city)
- Alternative designations: 1938 UB_{1} · 1933 UR_{1} 1967 UW
- Minor planet category: main-belt · (outer); Brasilia

Orbital characteristics
- Epoch 4 September 2017 (JD 2458000.5)
- Uncertainty parameter 0
- Observation arc: 78.62 yr (28,716 days)
- Aphelion: 3.2435 AU
- Perihelion: 2.4633 AU
- Semi-major axis: 2.8534 AU
- Eccentricity: 0.1367
- Orbital period (sidereal): 4.82 yr (1,760 days)
- Mean anomaly: 123.44°
- Mean motion: 0° 12^{m} 16.2^{s} / day
- Inclination: 15.059°
- Longitude of ascending node: 12.593°
- Argument of perihelion: 48.805°

Physical characteristics
- Mean diameter: 13.66±3.61 km 14.813±0.070 km 16.095±0.070 km 16.29±0.20 km 24.30 km (calculated)
- Synodic rotation period: 4.32±0.01 h 4.328159±0.000001 h
- Geometric albedo: 0.057 (assumed); 0.116±0.018; 0.1733±0.0300; 0.205±0.015; 0.22±0.12
- Spectral type: C
- Absolute magnitude (H): 11.5 · 11.8 · 11.90 · 11.92 · 12.17±0.45

1521 Seinäjoki (provisional designation 1938 UB_{1}) is a Brasilia asteroid from the outer region of the asteroid belt, approximately 14 kilometers in diameter. It was discovered on 22 October 1938, by Finnish astronomer Yrjö Väisälä at the southwestern Turku Observatory, Finland. The asteroid was later named after the Finnish city of Seinäjoki.

== Orbit and classification ==
Seinäjoki is a member of the Brasilia family, a smaller asteroid family of X-type asteroids in the outer main-belt. Since the family's namesake, 293 Brasilia, is a suspected interloper in its own family, it has also been named Seinäjoki family after Seinäjoki.

It orbits the Sun in the outer main-belt at a distance of 2.5–3.2 AU once every 4 years and 10 months (1,760 days). Its orbit has an eccentricity of 0.14 and an inclination of 15° with respect to the ecliptic. In 1933, Seinäjoki was first identified as 1933 UR_{1} at Simeiz Observatory. The body's observation arc, however, begins with its official discovery observation at Turku.

== Physical characteristics ==
=== Rotation and pole ===
In October 2010, a rotational lightcurve of Seinäjoki was obtained by Russell Durkee at the U.S. Shed of Science Observatory (H39) in Minneapolis. It gave it a well-defined rotation period of 4.32 hours with a brightness variation of 0.15 magnitude (U=3). A modeled lightcurve form Lowell photometric database gave a concurring period of 4.328 hours and a spin axis of (-18.0°, 230.0°) in ecliptic coordinates.

=== Diameter and albedo ===
According to the survey carried out by NASA's Wide-field Infrared Survey Explorer (WISE) with its subsequent NEOWISE mission, Seinäjoki measures between 13.66 and 14.81 kilometers in diameter, and its surface has an albedo between 0.205 and 0.22 (more recent results only).

The Collaborative Asteroid Lightcurve Link assumes a standard albedo for carbonaceous C-type asteroids of 0.057 and calculates a much larger diameter of 24.30 kilometers as a body's and diameter and reflectivity (albeo) correlate indirectly. However, based on the much higher albedo given by WISE/NEOWISE, the body is rather of a stony composition, which is untypical for asteroids in the outer main-belt.

== Naming ==
This minor planet was named for the city of Seinäjoki, located in Southern Ostrobothnia, western Finland. The official naming citation was published by the Minor Planet Center on 20 February 1976 (M.P.C. 3929).
