= 1478 Vihuri =

Main-belt asteroid

Discovery
- Discovered by: Y. Väisälä
- Discovery site: Turku Obs.
- Discovery date: 6 February 1938

Designations
- Named after: A. Vihuri (philanthropist)
- Alternative designations: 1938 CF · 1934 CG
- Minor planet category: main-belt · (inner)

Orbital characteristics
- Epoch 4 September 2017 (JD 2458000.5)
- Uncertainty parameter 0
- Observation arc: 110.54 yr (40,374 days)
- Aphelion: 2.6885 AU
- Perihelion: 2.2439 AU
- Semi-major axis: 2.4662 AU
- Eccentricity: 0.0901
- Orbital period (sidereal): 3.87 yr (1,415 days)
- Mean anomaly: 216.50°
- Mean motion: 0° 15^{m} 16.2^{s} / day
- Inclination: 7.8326°
- Longitude of ascending node: 318.57°
- Argument of perihelion: 161.04°

Physical characteristics
- Dimensions: 8.45 km (derived); 9.52±1.30 km 11.19±0.79 km
- Synodic rotation period: 19.5 h
- Geometric albedo: 0.126±0.068; 0.127±0.019; 0.20 (assumed)
- Spectral type: S B–V = 0.840; U–B = 0.570
- Absolute magnitude (H): 12.44±0.44 · 12.63 · 12.73 · 12.97

1478 Vihuri, provisional designation 1938 CF, is a stony asteroid from the inner regions of the asteroid belt, approximately 9 kilometers in diameter. It was discovered on 6 February 1938, by Finnish Yrjö Väisälä at Turku Observatory in Southwest Finland. The asteroid was named after a Finnish philanthropist by the name of A. Vihuri.

== Orbit and classification ==
Vihuri orbits the Sun in the inner main-belt at a distance of 2.2–2.7 AU once every 3 years and 10 months (1,415 days). Its orbit has an eccentricity of 0.09 and an inclination of 8° with respect to the ecliptic.0 The asteroid's observation arc begins 11 days prior to its official discovery observation. A precovery taken at Lowell Observatory in 1906, as well as identification 1934 CG made at Uccle in 1934, remained unused.

== Physical characteristics ==
=== Rotation period ===
In December 1983, a rotational lightcurve was obtained form photometric observations by American astronomer Richard P. Binzel. Analysis of the provisional lightcurve gave a rotation period of 19.5 hours with a brightness variation of 0.23 magnitude (U=1). As of 2017, no additional lightcurves of Vihuri have been obtained.

=== Diameter and albedo ===
According to the surveys carried out by the Japanese Akari satellite and NASA's Wide-field Infrared Survey Explorer with its subsequent NEOWISE mission, Vihuri measures 9.52 and 11.19 kilometers in diameter, and its surface has an albedo of 0.126 and 0.127, respectively. The Collaborative Asteroid Lightcurve Link assumes a standard albedo for stony S-type asteroid of 0.20 and calculates a diameter of 8.45 kilometers with an absolute magnitude of 12.73.

== Naming ==
This minor planet was named for Finnish philanthropist A. Vihuri, a ship owner and supporter of science and arts. The official naming citation was published by the Minor Planet Center on 15 July 1968 (M.P.C. 2882).
