= 1460 Haltia =

Main-belt asteroid

Discovery
- Discovered by: Y. Väisälä
- Discovery site: Turku Obs.
- Discovery date: 24 November 1937

Designations
- Named after: Halti/Haltia (highest Finnish peak)
- Alternative designations: 1937 WC
- Minor planet category: main-belt · (middle) background

Orbital characteristics
- Epoch 4 September 2017 (JD 2458000.5)
- Uncertainty parameter 0
- Observation arc: 79.61 yr (29,077 days)
- Aphelion: 3.0202 AU
- Perihelion: 2.0643 AU
- Semi-major axis: 2.5422 AU
- Eccentricity: 0.1880
- Orbital period (sidereal): 4.05 yr (1,481 days)
- Mean anomaly: 245.72°
- Mean motion: 0° 14^{m} 35.52^{s} / day
- Inclination: 6.6858°
- Longitude of ascending node: 74.185°
- Argument of perihelion: 358.22°

Physical characteristics
- Dimensions: 6.57±1.19 km 7.43±0.61 km 8.440±0.225 km 8.97 km (calculated)
- Synodic rotation period: 3.58682±0.00006 h 3.588±0.005 h 3.59 h
- Geometric albedo: 0.186±0.032; 0.20 (assumed); 0.226±0.030; 0.36±0.15
- Spectral type: S (assumed)
- Absolute magnitude (H): 12.60 · 12.7 · 12.78±0.14 · 13.10

1460 Haltia, provisional designation 1937 WC, is a stony background asteroid from the central regions of the asteroid belt, approximately 8 kilometers in diameter. It was discovered on 24 November 1937, by Finnish astronomer Yrjö Väisälä at the Iso-Heikkilä Observatory in Turku, Finland. The asteroid was named after Halti (Haltia), Finland's highest peak on the border to Norway.

== Orbit and classification ==
Haltia is a non-family asteroid of the main belt's background population. It orbits the Sun in the central asteroid belt at a distance of 2.1–3.0 AU once every 4 years and 1 month (1,481 days). Its orbit has an eccentricity of 0.19 and an inclination of 7° with respect to the ecliptic. The body's observation arc begins with its official discovery observation at Turku.

== Physical characteristics ==
Haltia is an assumed stony S-type asteroid.

=== Rotation period ===
Two rotational lightcurves of Haltia were obtained from photometric observations by astronomers Henk de Groot, Raoul Behrend and René Roy. Lightcurve analysis gave a respective rotation period of 3.58682 and 3.588 hours with a brightness amplitude of 0.32 magnitude (U=3-/3). The Lightcurve Data Base adopts a consolidated period of 3.59 hours.

=== Diameter and albedo ===
According to the surveys carried out by the Japanese Akari satellite and the NEOWISE mission of NASA's Wide-field Infrared Survey Explorer, Haltia measures between 6.57 and 8.44 kilometers in diameter and its surface has an albedo between 0.186 and 0.36.

The Collaborative Asteroid Lightcurve Link assumes a standard albedo for stony asteroids of 0.20 and calculates a diameter of 8.97 based on an absolute magnitude of 12.6.

== Naming ==
This minor planet was named after Halti (Haltia), the highest Finnish peak at 1,365 metres (4,478 ft) located on the border between Norway and Finland. The official naming citation was published by the Minor Planet Center on 20 February 1976 (M.P.C. 3928).
