= C/1942 EA (Väisälä) =

Halley-type comet

Discovery
- Discovered by: Yrjö Väisälä
- Discovery site: University of Turku, Finland
- Discovery date: 11 March 1942

Designations
- Alternative designations: Väisälä 2; 1942 II, 1942c

Orbital characteristics
- Epoch: 23 March 1942 (JD 2430441.5)
- Observation arc: 37 days
- Number of observations: 7
- Aphelion: 37.8±1.1 AU
- Perihelion: 1.287 AU
- Semi-major axis: 19.5±0.6 AU
- Eccentricity: 0.934±0.002
- Orbital period: 86.3±4 years
- Inclination: 38.00°±0.03°
- Longitude of ascending node: 172.3°
- Argument of periapsis: 335.2°
- Mean anomaly: 0.40°
- Last perihelion: 16 February 1942
- Next perihelion: 6 December 2027? 24 January 2028? (Nakano); 29 October 2028? (JPL)
- T_{Jupiter}: 1.36
- Earth MOID: 0.336 AU (50.3 million km)
- Jupiter MOID: 1.55 AU

Physical characteristics
- Comet nuclear magnitude (M2): 13.2
- Apparent magnitude: 12.0 (1942 apparition)

C/1942 EA (Väisälä) is a Halley-type comet with an orbital period of about 86±4 years. It is the third of four comets discovered by Finnish astronomer, Yrjö Väisälä. (Note: C/1942 EA is the second comet that he had discovered independently, as he spotted 139P/Väisälä–Oterma a few months after discovering his first comet, 40P/Väisälä, in 1939) Given only seven observations in the JPL SBDB solution, the comet's return is expected around 2027–2028. JPL Horizons has the comet remaining more than 1.9 AU (280 million km) from Earth during the 2028 passage.

== Observational history ==
A single photographic plate exposed by Väisälä on 11 March 1942 revealed two new star-like objects, later designated as 1942 EA and 1942 EC, within the constellation Leo. (Note: Reported initial position of the first object (1942 EA) upon discovery was: α = 10^{h} 56.5^{m} , δ = –0° 23′) Due to the temperamental communications at the time caused by World War II, scientists were at first unable to distinguish the two objects apart, initially preventing orbital calculations to be done.
