= 1533 Saimaa =

Main-belt asteroid

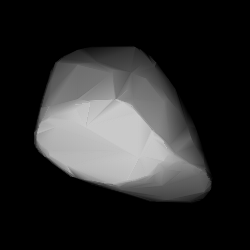
- Shape model of Saimaa derived from its lightcurve

Discovery
- Discovered by: Y. Väisälä
- Discovery site: Turku Obs.
- Discovery date: 19 January 1939

Designations
- Named after: Saimaa (Finnish lake)
- Alternative designations: 1939 BD · 1934 FA; 1936 QC · 1936 RP
- Minor planet category: main-belt · (outer); Eos

Orbital characteristics
- Epoch 4 September 2017 (JD 2458000.5)
- Uncertainty parameter 0
- Observation arc: 80.71 yr (29,480 days)
- Aphelion: 3.1226 AU
- Perihelion: 2.8990 AU
- Semi-major axis: 3.0108 AU
- Eccentricity: 0.0371
- Orbital period (sidereal): 5.22 yr (1,908 days)
- Mean anomaly: 346.96°
- Mean motion: 0° 11^{m} 19.32^{s} / day
- Inclination: 10.710°
- Longitude of ascending node: 156.74°
- Argument of perihelion: 10.478°

Physical characteristics
- Dimensions: 24.298±0.279 km 26.13±1.5 km 26.16 km (derived); 27.88±1.68 km
- Synodic rotation period: 7.08 h 7.1181±0.0002 h
- Geometric albedo: 0.107±0.014; 0.1216±0.016; 0.1270 (derived); 0.141±0.025; 0.165±0.034
- Spectral type: Tholen = S B–V = 0.790; U–B = 0.450
- Absolute magnitude (H): 10.77 · 10.77±0.26 · 10.82

1533 Saimaa (provisional designation 1939 BD) is a stony Eos asteroid from the outer regions of the asteroid belt, approximately 26 kilometers in diameter. It was discovered on 19 January 1939, by astronomer Yrjö Väisälä at the Iso-Heikkilä Observatory near Turku, Finland. The asteroid was named after lake Saimaa in Finland.

== Orbit and classification ==
Saimaa is a member the Eos family (606), the largest asteroid family of the outer main belt consisting of nearly 10,000 asteroids. It orbits the Sun at a distance of 2.9–3.1 AU once every 5 years and 3 months (1,908 days). Its orbit has an eccentricity of 0.04 and an inclination of 11° with respect to the ecliptic. The asteroid was first identified as 1934 FA at Uccle Observatory in March 1934. The body's observation arc begins with its identification as 1936 QC at Heidelberg Observatory in August 1936, more than 2 years prior to its official discovery observation at Turku.

== Physical characteristics ==
In the Tholen classification, Saimaa is a common stony S-type asteroid. The overall spectral type for members of the Eos family is that of a K-type.

=== Rotation period ===
In September 1983, a first rotational lightcurve of Saimaa was obtained from photometric observations by American astronomer Richard Binzel at CTIO and McDonald Observatory. Lightcurve analysis gave a well-defined rotation period of 7.08 hours with a brightness variation of 0.18 magnitude (U=3). In February 2007, another lightcurve obtained by French amateur astronomer René Roy gave a concurring period of 7.1181 hours and an amplitude of 0.26 magnitude (U=3).

=== Diameter and albedo ===
According to the surveys carried out by the Infrared Astronomical Satellite IRAS, the Japanese Akari satellite and the NEOWISE mission of NASA's Wide-field Infrared Survey Explorer, Saimaa measures between 22.40 and 27.88 kilometers in diameter and its surface has an albedo between 0.107 and 0.165.

The Collaborative Asteroid Lightcurve Link derives an albedo of 0.1270 and a diameter of 26.16 kilometers based on an absolute magnitude of 10.77.

== Naming ==
This minor planet was named after lake Saimaa in southeastern Finland. With an overall area of 4,400 square kilometres (1,700 sq mi), it is the country's largest lake and one of the largest lakes in Europe. The official naming citation was published by the Minor Planet Center on 20 February 1976 (M.P.C. 3929).
