= Nummela Standard Baseline =

Coordinates: 60°20′21.72″N 24°18′36.47″E

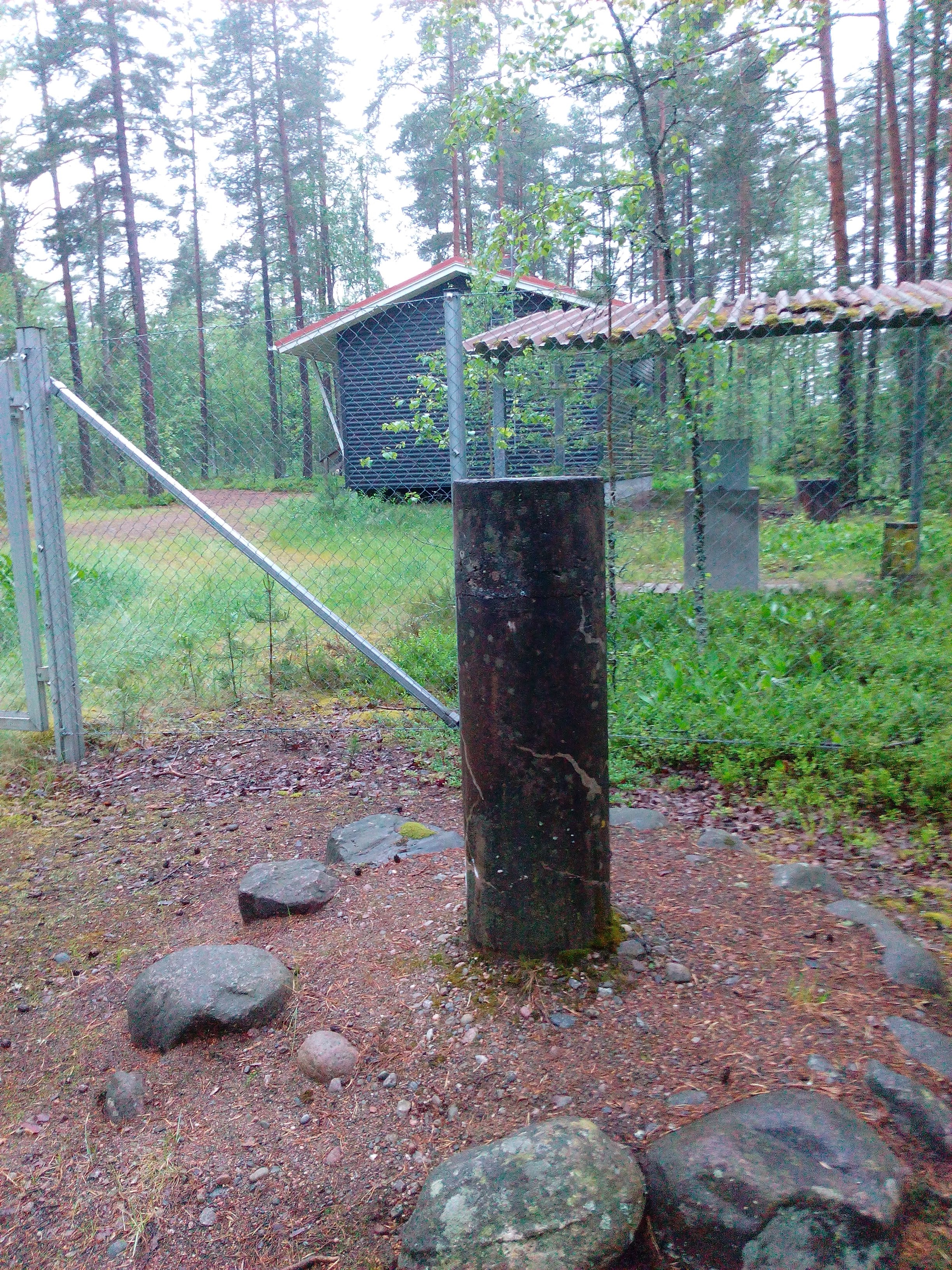
Photograph of one of the pillars of standard baseline in Nummelanharju (municipality of Vihti).

Nummela Standard Baseline is a baseline used to calibrate rangefinders, in Finland, located in the municipality of Vihti, Nummelanharju (esker) where it was built in 1932.

Winding ridge of stratified gravel and sand was chosen as a location for measurements since temperature variations cause very little displacement on soil where benchmarks are located. Measurement devices such as theodolite and mirrors are then placed on those pillars. Careful preliminary measurements such as levelling height differences of observation pillars reference points are required before actual measurements can begin.

In 1947, a white light interference based measurement system was taken to use. It was developed by Yrjö Väisälä. Before that baseline was defined by quartz made measuring rod, which was used to calibrate 24-meter long invar-wire. Standard baselines length is invar-wire multiplied by 36, which is 864 meters.

Measured numerical value for the 2007 standard baseline is 864 122.86 millimetres ±0.002 mm to ±0.007 mm uncertainty. 864 122.86 mm ≈ 864 m. Previously used quartz rod had 0.1 mm deviation from 1 meter – intended length – and it was taken account in new measurements. Because of accuracy, curvature of earth had to take in account when building the baseline: the middlepoint 432 m is 14.6 mm lower than zero & 864 -points. (Fig 17 in ref "144")
