= 1542 Schalén =

Main-belt asteroid

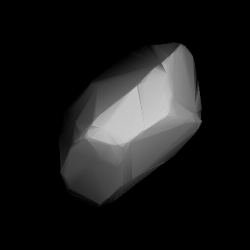
- Shape model of Schalén from its lightcurve

Discovery
- Discovered by: Y. Väisälä
- Discovery site: Turku Obs.
- Discovery date: 26 August 1941

Designations
- Named after: Karl Schalén (astronomer)
- Alternative designations: 1941 QE · 1927 BH; 1936 UL · 1940 LP; 1976 CA · A898 VD; A924 NA
- Minor planet category: main-belt · background

Orbital characteristics
- Epoch 16 February 2017 (JD 2457800.5)
- Uncertainty parameter 0
- Observation arc: 117.73 yr (43,001 days)
- Aphelion: 3.4510 AU
- Perihelion: 2.7343 AU
- Semi-major axis: 3.0926 AU
- Eccentricity: 0.1159
- Orbital period (sidereal): 5.44 yr (1,987 days)
- Mean anomaly: 284.94°
- Mean motion: 0° 10^{m} 52.32^{s} / day
- Inclination: 2.7662°
- Longitude of ascending node: 211.66°

Physical characteristics
- Dimensions: 42.374±0.273 km 45.05 km (derived); 48.998±0.480 km
- Synodic rotation period: 7.516±0.002 h
- Geometric albedo: 0.0501 (derived); 0.0509±0.0105; 0.068±0.003
- Spectral type: SMASS = D
- Absolute magnitude (H): 10.4 · 10.6

1542 Schalén (provisional designation 1941 QE) is a background asteroid from the outer region of the asteroid belt, approximately 45 kilometers in diameter. It was discovered on 26 August 1941, by Finnish astronomer Yrjö Väisälä at Turku Observatory in Southwest Finland. The dark D-type asteroid was later named after Swedish astronomer Karl Schalén.

== Orbit and classification ==
Schalén is a background asteroid, located near the region of the Themis family, a dynamical family of outer-belt asteroids with nearly coplanar ecliptical orbits. It orbits the Sun at a distance of 2.7–3.5 AU once every 5 years and 5 months (1,987 days). Its orbit has an eccentricity of 0.12 and an inclination of 3° with respect to the ecliptic. It was first identified as A898 VD at Heidelberg Observatory in 1898, extending the body's observation arc by 43 years prior to its official discovery observation at Turku.

== Physical characteristics ==
Schalén has a dark D-type spectrum, mostly found among Hildian asteroids and Jupiter trojans. Bodies with a D-type spectra are thought to have originated in the Kuiper belt.

=== Diameter and albedo ===
According to the 2014-result of the survey carried by NASA's Wide-field Infrared Survey Explorer with its subsequent NEOWISE mission, Schalén measures 42.374 kilometers in diameter and its surface has an albedo of 0.068, while the Collaborative Asteroid Lightcurve Link derives an albedo of 0.0509 and a diameter of 45.05 kilometers with an absolute magnitude of 10.6.

=== Rotation period ===
In November 2012, a rotational lightcurve of Schalén was obtained from photometric observations by astronomers at the Purple Mountain Observatory in collaboration with observatories in the United States. Lightcurve analysis gave a well-defined rotation period of 7.516 hours with a brightness variation of 0.49 magnitude (U=3).

== Naming ==
This minor planet was named in honour of Swedish astronomer Karl Adam Wilhelm Schalén (1902–1993), who was a director of the Swedish Lund Observatory. The official naming citation was published by the Minor Planet Center on 20 February 1976 (M.P.C. 3930).
