= 1523 Pieksämäki =

Florian asteroid

Discovery
- Discovered by: Y. Väisälä
- Discovery site: Turku Obs.
- Discovery date: 18 January 1939

Designations
- Named after: Pieksämäki (Finnish town)
- Alternative designations: 1939 BC · 1936 FO_{1} 1936 HC · 1946 GB; 1949 AC
- Minor planet category: main-belt · Flora

Orbital characteristics
- Epoch 4 September 2017 (JD 2458000.5)
- Uncertainty parameter 0
- Observation arc: 80.20 yr (29,294 days)
- Aphelion: 2.4509 AU
- Perihelion: 2.0327 AU
- Semi-major axis: 2.2418 AU
- Eccentricity: 0.0933
- Orbital period (sidereal): 3.36 yr (1,226 days)
- Mean anomaly: 131.04°
- Inclination: 5.1411°
- Longitude of ascending node: 327.79°
- Argument of perihelion: 187.58°

Physical characteristics
- Dimensions: 8.98 km (calculated); 9.111±0.313 km 10.008±0.057 km
- Synodic rotation period: 5.3202±0.0005 h 5.3210±0.0001 h 5.33 h
- Geometric albedo: 0.2135±0.0277; 0.24 (assumed); 0.281±0.041; 0.505±0.294
- Spectral type: S
- Absolute magnitude (H): 11.56 · 12.3 · 12.4 · 12.58±0.53

1523 Pieksämäki (provisional designation 1939 BC) is a stony Florian asteroid from the inner regions of the asteroid belt, approximately 9 kilometers in diameter. It was discovered on 18 January 1939, by Finnish astronomer Yrjö Väisälä at the Turku Observatory in Southwest Finland, and named for the town of Pieksämäki.

== Orbit and classification ==
This S-type asteroid is a member of the Flora family, one of the largest groups of stony asteroids in the main-belt. It orbits the Sun at a distance of 2.0–2.5 AU once every 3 years and 4 months (1,226 days). Its orbit has an eccentricity of 0.09 and an inclination of 5° with respect to the ecliptic. In 1936, it was first identified as 1936 FO_{1} at Nice Observatory, extending Pieksämäki's observation arc by 3 years prior to its official discovery observation at Turku.

== Physical characteristics ==
=== Lightcurves ===
In December 2005, American amateur astronomer Donald P. Pray obtained a rotational lightcurve at Carbuncle Hill Observatory in collaboration with other astronomers. Light-curve analysis gave a well-defined rotation period of 5.3202 hours with a brightness variation of 0.47 magnitude (U=3).

Previous photometric observations were made by Kryszczyńska et al. in July 2004, that gave an identical period with an amplitude of 0.40 magnitude (U=2+), and by Claes-Ingvar Lagerkvist, who derived a period of 5.33 hours (Δ0.5 mag) already in the 1970s (U=2). In March 2013, another well-defined period of 5.3210 hours (Δ0.42 mag) was obtained by French amateur astronomer René Roy.

=== Diameter and albedo ===
According to the surveys carried out by NASA's Wide-field Infrared Survey Explorer with its subsequent NEOWISE mission, Pieksämäki measures 9.111 and 10.008 kilometers in diameter, and its surface has an albedo between 0.213 and 0.505. The Collaborative Asteroid Lightcurve Link assumes an albedo of 0.24 – derived from 8 Flora, the family's principal body and namesake – and calculates a diameter of 8.98 kilometers based on an absolute magnitude of 12.4.

== Naming ==
This minor planet was named for Pieksämäki, an eastern Finnish town in Southern Savonia. The official naming citation was published by the Minor Planet Center on 20 February 1976 (M.P.C. 3929).
