= 1535 Päijänne =

Asteroid

Discovery
- Discovered by: Y. Väisälä
- Discovery site: Turku Observatory
- Discovery date: 9 September 1939

Designations
- Pronunciation: pæi(j)ænːe
- Named after: Lake Päijänne (Finland)
- Alternative designations: 1939 RC · 1933 QE_{1} 1944 OA · 1956 XB; 1985 XE_{2} · A916 OB
- Minor planet category: main-belt · (outer)

Orbital characteristics
- Epoch 4 September 2017 (JD 2458000.5)
- Uncertainty parameter 0
- Observation arc: 83.77 yr (30,598 days)
- Aphelion: 3.7718 AU
- Perihelion: 2.5586 AU
- Semi-major axis: 3.1652 AU
- Eccentricity: 0.1916
- Orbital period (sidereal): 5.63 yr (2,057 days)
- Mean anomaly: 23.100°
- Mean motion: 0° 10^{m} 30^{s} / day
- Inclination: 6.0561°
- Longitude of ascending node: 264.79°
- Argument of perihelion: 39.922°

Physical characteristics
- Dimensions: 23.836±0.206 km 25.518±0.187 km 26.12±0.42 km 26.36 km (derived); 26.72±1.0 km
- Synodic rotation period: 8.8448±0.0007 h
- Geometric albedo: 0.0638 (derived); 0.1299±0.011; 0.140±0.005; 0.1430±0.0230; 0.164±0.031
- Spectral type: CX · S
- Absolute magnitude (H): 10.7 · 11.44±0.09 · 11.5

1535 Päijänne (/pæi(j)ænːe/; provisional designation 1939 RC) is an asteroid from the outer region of the asteroid belt, approximately 25 kilometers in diameter. It was discovered on 9 September 1939, by Finnish astronomer Yrjö Väisälä at the Turku Observatory in Southwest Finland. It was later named for Lake Päijänne.

== Orbit ==
Päijänne orbits the Sun in the outer main-belt at a distance of 2.6–3.8 AU once every 5 years and 8 months (2,057 days). Its orbit has an eccentricity of 0.19 and an inclination of 6° with respect to the ecliptic. It was first identified as A916 OB at Simeiz Observatory in 1916. The body's observation arc begins 6 years prior to its official discovery with its identification as 1933 QE_{1} at Heidelberg Observatory.

== Physical characteristics ==
Päijänne is classified as both S-type and transitional CX-type asteroid.

=== Lightcurves ===
In September 2006, a rotational lightcurve of Päijänne was obtained from photometric observations taken by French amateur astronomer Laurent Bernasconi. The lightcurve analysis gave a well-defined rotation period of 8.8448 hours with a change in brightness of 0.50 magnitude (U=3).

=== Diameter and albedo ===
According to the surveys carried out by the Infrared Astronomical Satellite IRAS, the Japanese Akari satellite, and NASA's Wide-field Infrared Survey Explorer with its subsequent NEOWISE mission, Päijänne measures between 23.836 and 26.72 kilometers in diameter, and its surface has an albedo between 0.1299 and 0.164. The Collaborative Asteroid Lightcurve Link derives an albedo of 0.0638 and a diameter of 26.36 kilometers with an absolute magnitude of 11.5.

== Naming ==
This minor planet was named for Finland's second largest lake, Päijänne, located in south-central Finland, and more than a thousand square kilometers in size. The official naming citation was published by the Minor Planet Center on 20 February 1976 (M.P.C. 3929).
