= 1532 Inari =

Main-belt asteroid discovered on 1938-09-16 by Yrjö Väisälä at Turku

Discovery
- Discovered by: Y. Väisälä
- Discovery site: Turku Obs.
- Discovery date: 16 September 1938

Designations
- Named after: Lake Inari (Finnish lake)
- Alternative designations: 1938 SM · 1933 SZ; 1935 BJ · 1936 FP_{1}
- Minor planet category: main-belt · (outer); Eos

Orbital characteristics
- Epoch 4 September 2017 (JD 2458000.5)
- Uncertainty parameter 0
- Observation arc: 80.74 yr (29,492 days)
- Aphelion: 3.1618 AU
- Perihelion: 2.8486 AU
- Semi-major axis: 3.0052 AU
- Eccentricity: 0.0521
- Orbital period (sidereal): 5.21 yr (1,903 days)
- Mean anomaly: 325.80°
- Mean motion: 0° 11^{m} 21.12^{s} / day
- Inclination: 8.7769°
- Longitude of ascending node: 330.63°
- Argument of perihelion: 122.85°

Physical characteristics
- Dimensions: 24.439±0.056 km 26.759±0.099 km 28.38 km (derived); 29.53±0.56 km 30.39±3.24 km
- Synodic rotation period: 25 h
- Geometric albedo: 0.060±0.003; 0.0623±0.0080; 0.078±0.011; 0.087±0.039; 0.1049 (derived)
- Spectral type: Tholen = S B–V = 0.840; U–B = 0.360
- Absolute magnitude (H): 10.8 · 10.86 · 11.50

1532 Inari (provisional designation 1938 SM) is a stony Eoan asteroid from the outer regions of the asteroid belt, approximately 28 kilometers in diameter. Discovered by Yrjö Väisälä at Turku Observatory in 1938, it was later named for Lake Inari in northern Finland.

== Discovery ==
Inari was discovered on 16 September 1938, by Finnish astronomer Yrjö Väisälä at the Iso-Heikkilä Observatory near Turku, Finland. The asteroid was first identified as 1933 SZ at Simeiz Observatory in September 1933, and its observation arc begins at Nice Observatory in April 1936, more than two years prior to its official discovery observation at Turku.

== Orbit and classification ==
Inari is a member the Eos family (606), one of the asteroid belt's largest families with nearly 10,000 known asteroids. It orbits the Sun in the outer main belt at a distance of 2.8–3.2 AU once every 5 years and 3 months (1,903 days). Its orbit has an eccentricity of 0.05 and an inclination of 9° with respect to the ecliptic.

== Physical characteristics ==
In the Tholen classification, Saimaa is a featureless stony S-type asteroid. The overall spectral type for members of the Eos family is that of a K-type.

=== Rotation period ===
In January 2008, a fragmentary rotational lightcurve of Inari was obtained from photometric observations by French amateur astronomer René Roy. Lightcurve analysis gave a longer-than-average rotation period of 25 hours with a low brightness amplitude of 0.09 magnitude (U=1+). As of 2017, no secure period has been obtained.

=== Diameter and albedo ===
According to the surveys carried out by the Japanese Akari satellite and the NEOWISE mission of NASA's Wide-field Infrared Survey Explorer, Inari measures between 24.439 and 30.39 kilometers in diameter and its surface has an albedo between 0.060 and 0.087. The Collaborative Asteroid Lightcurve Link derives an albedo of 0.1049 and a diameter of 28.38 kilometers based on an absolute magnitude of 10.8.

== Naming ==
This minor planet was named after Lake Inari (Inarijärvi), located north of the Arctic Circle in Lapland, Finland. Lake Inari is the country's third-largest lake and one of the largest lakes in Europe.

The official naming citation was published by the Minor Planet Center on 20 February 1976 (M.P.C. 3929).
