= 1447 Utra =

Stony asteroid, slow rotator and suspected tumbler

Discovery
- Discovered by: Y. Väisälä
- Discovery site: Turku Obs.
- Discovery date: 26 January 1938

Designations
- Named after: Utra (Finnish town)
- Alternative designations: 1938 BB · 1936 SB; 1951 KO · A918 FA
- Minor planet category: main-belt · (middle)

Orbital characteristics
- Epoch 4 September 2017 (JD 2458000.5)
- Uncertainty parameter 0
- Observation arc: 98.67 yr (36,038 days)
- Aphelion: 2.6404 AU
- Perihelion: 2.4299 AU
- Semi-major axis: 2.5352 AU
- Eccentricity: 0.0415
- Orbital period (sidereal): 4.04 yr (1,474 days)
- Mean anomaly: 285.64°
- Mean motion: 0° 14^{m} 39.12^{s} / day
- Inclination: 4.7865°
- Longitude of ascending node: 35.528°
- Argument of perihelion: 64.085°

Physical characteristics
- Dimensions: 11.83±0.86 km 11.834±0.122 km 12.634±0.103 km 13.26±0.53 km 13.58 km (calculated)
- Synodic rotation period: 257±30 h (Note: Martinez (2011) web: rotation period 257±30 hours with a brightness amplitude of 0.63 mag. Summary figures for (1447) Utra at Collaborative Asteroid Lightcurve Link (CALL). The referenced website was a non-recoverable dead link.)
- Geometric albedo: 0.20 (assumed); 0.303±0.038; 0.3381±0.0591; 0.381±0.058
- Spectral type: S
- Absolute magnitude (H): 11.30 · 11.60±0.44 · 11.7

1447 Utra, provisional designation 1938 BB, is a stony asteroid, slow rotator and suspected tumbler from the central region of the asteroid belt, approximately 12 kilometers in diameter. It was discovered on 26 January 1938, by Finnish astronomer Yrjö Väisälä at Turku Observatory in Southwest Finland. The asteroid was named for the Finnish town of Utra (now a part of Joensuu).

== Orbit and classification ==
Utra is a S-type asteroid. It orbits the Sun in the central main-belt at a distance of 2.4–2.6 AU once every 4.04 years (1,474 days). Its orbit has an eccentricity of 0.04 and an inclination of 5° with respect to the ecliptic. Utra was first identified as A918 FA at Heidelberg Observatory in 1918. The body's observation arc begins with its official discovery observation at Turku in 1938.

== Physical characteristics ==
=== Slow rotator ===
In March 2011, a rotational lightcurve of Utra was obtained from photometric observations by astronomer Luis E. Martinez. Lightcurve analysis gave a long rotation period of 257 hours with a brightness variation of 0.63 magnitude (U=2). This slow rotator is also a suspected tumbler (T0).

=== Diameter and albedo ===
According to the surveys carried out by the Japanese Akari satellite and NASA's Wide-field Infrared Survey Explorer with its subsequent NEOWISE mission, Utra measures between 11.83 and 13.26 kilometers in diameter, and its surface has an albedo between 0.303 and 0.381. The Collaborative Asteroid Lightcurve Link assumes a standard albedo for stony asteroids of 0.20 and calculates a diameter of 13.58 kilometers with an absolute magnitude of 11.7.

== Naming ==
This minor planet was named for Utra, a northeastern Finnish town and birthplace of the discoverer. The official naming citation was published by the Minor Planet Center on 30 January 1964 (M.P.C. 2277).
