= 1500 Jyväskylä =

Asteroid

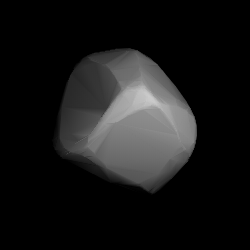
- Shape model of Jyväskylä from its lightcurve

Discovery
- Discovered by: Y. Väisälä
- Discovery site: Turku Obs.
- Discovery date: 16 October 1938

Designations
- Pronunciation: Finnish: [ˈjyʋæsˌkylæ]
- Named after: Jyväskylä (Finnish city)
- Alternative designations: 1938 UH
- Minor planet category: main-belt · Flora

Orbital characteristics
- Epoch 4 September 2017 (JD 2458000.5)
- Uncertainty parameter 0
- Observation arc: 68.59 yr (25,051 days)
- Aphelion: 2.6685 AU
- Perihelion: 1.8186 AU
- Semi-major axis: 2.2435 AU
- Eccentricity: 0.1894
- Orbital period (sidereal): 3.36 yr (1,227 days)
- Mean anomaly: 172.97°
- Mean motion: 0° 17^{m} 35.88^{s} / day
- Inclination: 7.4359°
- Longitude of ascending node: 19.925°
- Argument of perihelion: 17.100°

Physical characteristics
- Dimensions: 6.63 km (calculated); 7.39±1.59 km 8.088±0.103 km 8.095±0.136 km
- Synodic rotation period: 8.82750±0.00001 h
- Geometric albedo: 0.161±0.050; 0.1614±0.0254; 0.24 (assumed); 0.31±0.13
- Spectral type: Tholen = S · S B–V = 0.920; U–B = 0.520
- Absolute magnitude (H): 12.76 · 13.06

1500 Jyväskylä (Finnish: [ˈjyʋæsˌkylæ]; provisional designation 1938 UH) is a stony Florian asteroid from the inner regions of the asteroid belt, approximately 7 kilometers in diameter. It was discovered on 16 October 1938, by Finnish astronomer Yrjö Väisälä at the Turku Observatory in Southwest Finland. It was named for the Finnish town Jyväskylä.

== Classification and orbit ==
Jyväskylä is a member of the Flora family, a large collisional group of stony asteroids. It orbits the Sun in the inner main-belt at a distance of 1.8–2.7 AU once every 3 years and 4 months (1,227 days). Its orbit has an eccentricity of 0.19 and an inclination of 7° with respect to the ecliptic. The body's observation arc begins at Turku, 3 weeks prior to its official discovery observation.

== Physical characteristics ==
In 2016, Jyväskylä's modeled lightcurve was derived from data contained in the Lowell photometric database. Lightcurve analysis revealed a rotation period of 8.8275 hours and a spin axis of (123°, −75.0°) in ecliptic coordinates (U=n.a.).

According to the survey carried out by NASA's Wide-field Infrared Survey Explorer (WISE) with its subsequent NEOWISE mission, the asteroid measures between 7.39 and 8.095 kilometers in diameter, and its surface has an albedo between 0.161 and 0.31. The Collaborative Asteroid Lightcurve Link assumes an albedo of 0.24 – derived from 8 Flora, the largest member and namesake of this family – and calculates a diameter of 6.63 kilometers, using an absolute magnitude of 13.06.

== Naming ==
This minor planet was named for the Finnish town Jyväskylä. It is the largest city in the region of Central Finland and on the Finnish Lakeland. The official naming citation was published by the Minor Planet Center on 20 February 1976 (M.P.C. 3928).
