= 2826 Ahti =

Main-belt asteroid

Discovery
- Discovered by: Y. Väisälä
- Discovery site: Turku Obs.
- Discovery date: 18 October 1939

Designations
- Named after: Ahti (Finnish mythology)
- Alternative designations: 1939 UJ · 1942 FH; 1950 TG_{3} · 1968 UT_{2} 1979 RG · 1980 VK_{1}
- Minor planet category: main-belt · (outer)

Orbital characteristics
- Epoch 4 September 2017 (JD 2458000.5)
- Uncertainty parameter 0
- Observation arc: 77.63 yr (28,355 days)
- Aphelion: 3.3789 AU
- Perihelion: 3.0708 AU
- Semi-major axis: 3.2248 AU
- Eccentricity: 0.0478
- Orbital period (sidereal): 5.79 yr (2,115 days)
- Mean anomaly: 2.3046°
- Mean motion: 0° 10^{m} 12.72^{s} / day
- Inclination: 15.466°
- Longitude of ascending node: 33.671°
- Argument of perihelion: 150.83°

Physical characteristics
- Dimensions: 36.60 km (derived); 36.71±2.7 km (IRAS:24); 39.975±0.157; 42.16±0.62 km 42.373±0.121 km 55.33±0.29 km
- Synodic rotation period: 24 h
- Geometric albedo: 0.023±0.004; 0.0471±0.0122; 0.0479 (derived); 0.049±0.002; 0.0628±0.010 (IRAS:24)
- Spectral type: C
- Absolute magnitude (H): 11.1 · 10.80 · 11.00 · 11.25±0.25

2826 Ahti, provisional designation 1939 UJ, is a carbonaceous asteroid from the outer region of the asteroid belt, about 37 kilometers in diameter. The asteroid was discovered on 18 October 1939, by Finnish astronomer Yrjö Väisälä at Turku Observatory, Southwest Finland. It was named after Ahti from Finnish mythology.

== Orbit and classification ==
Ahti orbits the Sun in the outer main-belt at a distance of 3.1–3.4 AU once every 5 years and 9 months (2,115 days). Its orbit has an eccentricity of 0.05 and an inclination of 15° with respect to the ecliptic.

== Physical characteristics ==
Ahti has been characterized as a dark C-type asteroid.

=== Rotation period ===
A photometric lightcurve analysis by French astronomer Pierre Antonini in 2006, gave a longer than average rotation period of 24 hours (U=1). The result, however, is considered to be only provisional.

=== Diameter and albedo ===
According to the surveys carried out by the Infrared Astronomical Satellite IRAS, the Japanese Akari satellite, and NASA's Wide-field Infrared Survey Explorer with its subsequent NEOWISE mission, Ahti measures between 36.71 and 55.33 kilometers in diameter and its surface has a low albedo between 0.023 and 0.0628.

The Collaborative Asteroid Lightcurve Link agrees best with the results obtained by IRAS, and derives a diameter of 36.60 kilometers with an albedo of 0.0479 and an absolute magnitude of 11.1.

== Naming ==
This minor planet was named for the god of the sea and of fishing, Ahti (also known as Ahto), mentioned in the Kalevala, a 19th-century work of epic poetry from Karelian and Finnish oral folklore and mythology.

The asteroid 1454 Kalevala is named after the Finnish national epic. Ahti is also a common masculine name in Finland. The official naming citation was published by the Minor Planet Center on 26 May 1983 (M.P.C. 7949).
