= 1541 Estonia =

Asteroid from the central regions of the asteroid belt

Discovery
- Discovered by: Y. Väisälä
- Discovery site: Turku Observatory
- Discovery date: 12 February 1939

Designations
- Named after: Estonia (Baltic country)
- Alternative designations: 1939 CK · 1930 FE; 1930 FV · 1950 RG_{1} 1950 SR · 1959 RF_{1} A916 GE · A923 VE
- Minor planet category: main-belt · (middle)

Orbital characteristics
- Epoch 4 September 2017 (JD 2458000.5)
- Uncertainty parameter 0
- Observation arc: 93.57 yr (34,176 days)
- Aphelion: 2.9610 AU
- Perihelion: 2.5761 AU
- Semi-major axis: 2.7685 AU
- Eccentricity: 0.0695
- Orbital period (sidereal): 4.61 yr (1,683 days)
- Mean anomaly: 346.22°
- Mean motion: 0° 12^{m} 50.4^{s} / day
- Inclination: 4.8750°
- Longitude of ascending node: 1.4553°
- Argument of perihelion: 192.84°

Physical characteristics
- Dimensions: 19.53±0.40 km 20.15 km (derived); 20.56±6.71 km 22.000±0.342 km 23.89±1.35 km 24.542±0.096 km
- Synodic rotation period: 10.1±1.0 h
- Geometric albedo: 0.0976±0.0129; 0.104±0.012; 0.12±0.13; 0.1314 (derived); 0.140±0.016
- Spectral type: SMASS = Xc · X
- Absolute magnitude (H): 11.20 · 11.30 · 11.4 · 11.56±0.24

1541 Estonia (provisional designation 1939 CK) is an asteroid from the central regions of the asteroid belt, approximately 21 kilometers in diameter. It was discovered on 12 February 1939, by astronomer Yrjö Väisälä at the Iso-Heikkilä Observatory near Turku, Finland. The asteroid was named after the Baltic country of Estonia.

== Orbit and classification ==
Estonia is a non-family asteroid from the main belt's background population. It orbits the Sun in the central main belt at a distance of 2.6–3.0 AU once every 4 years and 7 months (1,683 days). Its orbit has an eccentricity of 0.07 and an inclination of 5° with respect to the ecliptic.

The asteroid was first identified as A916 GE at the Simeiz Observatory in April 1916. The body's observation arc begins with its identification as A923 VE at Yerkes Observatory in November 1923, more than 15 years prior to its official discovery observation at Turku.

== Physical characteristics ==
In the SMASS classification, Estonia is an Xc-subtype asteroid; asteroids of the Xc subtype have characteristics intermediate of X-type asteroids and carbonaceous C-type asteroids.

=== Rotation period ===
In November 2015, a rotational lightcurve of Estonia was obtained from photometric observations by French amateur astronomer René Roy. Lightcurve analysis gave a rotation period of 10.1 hours with a brightness amplitude of 0.13 magnitude (U=2-).

=== Diameter and albedo ===
According to the surveys carried out by the Japanese Akari satellite and the NEOWISE mission of NASA's Wide-field Infrared Survey Explorer, Estonia measures between 19.53 and 24.542 kilometers in diameter and its surface has an albedo between 0.0976 and 0.140.

The Collaborative Asteroid Lightcurve Link derives an albedo of 0.1314 and a diameter of 20.15 kilometers based on an absolute magnitude of 11.3.

== Naming ==
This minor planet was named after the Baltic country of Estonia, just south of the Gulf of Finland and Finland itself. The two countries are inhabited by related Balto-Finnic peoples. Estonia regained independence from Soviet rule in 1991. The official naming citation was published by the Minor Planet Center in January 1956 (M.P.C. 1350).
