= 1520 Imatra =

Main-belt asteroid

Discovery
- Discovered by: Y. Väisälä
- Discovery site: Turku Obs.
- Discovery date: 22 October 1938

Designations
- Named after: Imatra (Finnish town)
- Alternative designations: 1938 UY · 1938 YH
- Minor planet category: main-belt · (outer); Ursula

Orbital characteristics
- Epoch 4 September 2017 (JD 2458000.5)
- Uncertainty parameter 0
- Observation arc: 78.53 yr (28,682 days)
- Aphelion: 3.4132 AU
- Perihelion: 2.8113 AU
- Semi-major axis: 3.1123 AU
- Eccentricity: 0.0967
- Orbital period (sidereal): 5.49 yr (2,005 days)
- Mean anomaly: 179.71°
- Mean motion: 0° 10^{m} 46.2^{s} / day
- Inclination: 15.241°
- Longitude of ascending node: 253.40°
- Argument of perihelion: 116.83°

Physical characteristics
- Dimensions: 53.41 km (derived); 53.42±19.70 km 53.435±0.370 km 53.61±1.4 km 53.79±14.73 km 55.55±0.60 km 56.094±1.824 km 58.63±0.70 km
- Synodic rotation period: 5.23 h (dated); 18.609±0.004 h 18.635±0.004 h
- Geometric albedo: 0.039±0.009; 0.04±0.03; 0.0428 (derived); 0.05±0.06; 0.0561±0.0109; 0.058±0.002; 0.0615±0.003; 0.062±0.006
- Spectral type: SMASS = C · C
- Absolute magnitude (H): 10.0 · 10.30 · 10.40±0.35 · 10.4 · 10.43

1520 Imatra (provisional designation 1938 UY) is a carbonaceous Ursula asteroid from the outer region of the asteroid belt, approximately 54 kilometers in diameter. It was discovered on 22 October 1938, by Finnish astronomer Yrjö Väisälä at Turku Observatory in Southwest Finland, who named after the Finnish town of Imatra.

== Orbit ==
Imatra is a member of the Ursula family (631), a large family of C- and X-type asteroids, named after its parent body, 375 Ursula. It orbits the Sun in the outer main-belt at a distance of 2.8–3.4 AU once every 5 years and 6 months (2,005 days; semi-major axis of 3.11 AU). Its orbit has an eccentricity of 0.10 and an inclination of 15° with respect to the ecliptic. No precoveries and no prior identifications were made. Imatra's observation arc begins at Turku, 3 weeks after its official discovery observation.

== Physical characteristics ==
Imatra is a C-type asteroid in the SMASS taxonomy.

=== Rotation period ===
In July 2008, American astronomer Brian Warner obtained a rotational lightcurve of Imatra at his Palmer Divide Observatory in Colorado. It gave a rotation period of 18.635 hours with a brightness variation of 0.28 magnitude (U=3-), superseding a period of 5.23 hours from observations at Italian and French observatories in the 1990s (U=2). In September 2014, photometric observations by French amateur astronomers Laurent Bernasconi, Romain Montaigut and Arnaud Leroy gave a period of 18.609 hours with an amplitude of 0.27 magnitude (U=2+).

=== Diameter and albedo ===
According to the surveys carried out by the Infrared Astronomical Satellite IRAS, the Japanese Akari satellite, and NASA's Wide-field Infrared Survey Explorer with its subsequent NEOWISE mission, Imatra measures between 53.42 and 58.63 kilometers in diameter, and its surface has an albedo between 0.039 and 0.062. The Collaborative Asteroid Lightcurve Link derives an albedo of 0.0428 and a diameter of 53.41 kilometers using an absolute magnitude of 10.4.

== Naming ==
This minor planet is named for the south-eastern Finnish town Imatra, located in South Karelia near the Russian border, about halfway between St Petersburg and Finland's capital Helsinki. The official naming citation was published by the Minor Planet Center on 20 February 1976 (M.P.C. 3929).
