= 3037 Alku =

Asteroid

Discovery
- Discovered by: Y. Väisälä
- Discovery site: Turku Obs.
- Discovery date: 16 January 1944

Designations
- Named after: Alku (a boat's name)
- Alternative designations: 1944 BA · 1979 BH
- Minor planet category: main-belt · (middle)

Orbital characteristics
- Epoch 4 September 2017 (JD 2458000.5)
- Uncertainty parameter 0
- Observation arc: 72.87 yr (26,615 days)
- Aphelion: 3.1798 AU
- Perihelion: 2.1670 AU
- Semi-major axis: 2.6734 AU
- Eccentricity: 0.1894
- Orbital period (sidereal): 4.37 yr (1,597 days)
- Mean anomaly: 329.14°
- Mean motion: 0° 13^{m} 31.8^{s} / day
- Inclination: 19.022°
- Longitude of ascending node: 107.80°
- Argument of perihelion: 330.32°

Physical characteristics
- Dimensions: 18.84 km (derived); 18.91±0.8 km (IRAS:8); 26.44±0.61 km 29.289±0.302 km 29.876±0.186
- Synodic rotation period: 11.844±0.002 h
- Geometric albedo: 0.0343±0.0090; 0.044±0.008; 0.061±0.003; 0.0949 (derived); 0.1131±0.011 (IRAS:8)
- Spectral type: SMASS = C · C
- Absolute magnitude (H): 11.6 · 11.8

3037 Alku, provisional designation 1944 BA, is a carbonaceous asteroid from the central region of the asteroid belt, approximately 20 kilometers in diameter. It was discovered on 17 January 1944, by Finnish astronomer Yrjö Väisälä at Turku Observatory in Southwest Finland.

== Orbit and classification ==
The C-type asteroid orbits the Sun in the central main-belt at a distance of 2.2–3.2 AU once every 4 years and 4 months (1,597 days). Its orbit has an eccentricity of 0.19 and an inclination of 19° with respect to the ecliptic. No precoveries were taken before its discovery.

== Rotation period ==
A rotational lightcurve for this asteroid was obtained from photometric measurements taken by American astronomer Brian Warner at the Palmer Divide Observatory, Colorado, in January 2005. The lightcurve gave a well-defined rotation period of 11.844±0.002 hours with a brightness variation of 0.95 in magnitude (U=3).

== Diameter estimates ==
According to the space-based surveys carried out by the Infrared Astronomical Satellite (IRAS), the Japanese Akari satellite, and the NEOWISE mission of NASA's Wide-field Infrared Survey Explorer, the asteroid measures between 18.9 and 29.9 kilometers in diameter and it has an albedo in the range of 0.03 to 0.11. The Collaborative Asteroid Lightcurve Link agrees with the results obtained by IRAS, and derives an albedo of 0.09 with a diameter of 18.8 kilometers with an absolute magnitude of 11.8.

== Naming ==
This minor planet was named after the sailing boat Alku ("the beginning" in Finnish). Built by his father, the discoverer used to sail it in his childhood, and it became the origin of his enduring passion for sailing. The approved naming citation was published by the Minor Planet Center on 27 June 1991 (M.P.C. 18450).
