= 1503 Kuopio =

Main-belt asteroid

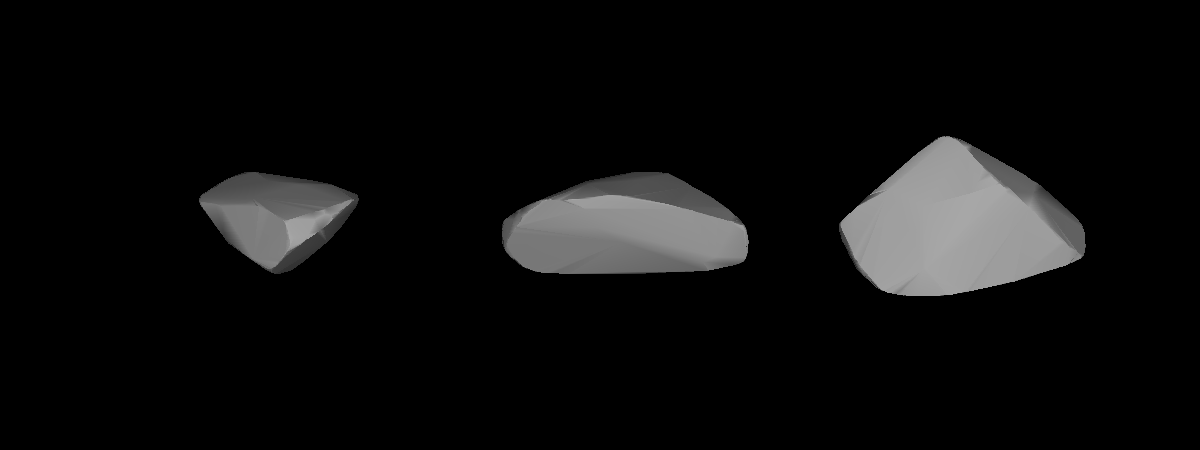
- Lightcurve-based 3D-model of Kuopio

Discovery
- Discovered by: Y. Väisälä
- Discovery site: Turku Obs.
- Discovery date: 15 December 1938

Designations
- Named after: Kuopio (Finnish town)
- Alternative designations: 1938 XD · 1935 EF; 1953 LH
- Minor planet category: main-belt · (middle); Eunomia

Orbital characteristics
- Epoch 4 September 2017 (JD 2458000.5)
- Uncertainty parameter 0
- Observation arc: 82.34 yr (30,075 days)
- Aphelion: 2.8995 AU
- Perihelion: 2.3499 AU
- Semi-major axis: 2.6247 AU
- Eccentricity: 0.1047
- Orbital period (sidereal): 4.25 yr (1,553 days)
- Mean anomaly: 154.93°
- Mean motion: 0° 13^{m} 54.48^{s} / day
- Inclination: 12.369°
- Longitude of ascending node: 316.98°
- Argument of perihelion: 177.92°

Physical characteristics
- Dimensions: 18.43±1.5 km 18.54 km (derived); 22.33±0.34 km 22.985±0.964 km
- Synodic rotation period: 9.577±0.0004 h 9.957±0.006 h 9.9586±0.0005 h 9.96±0.05 h 9.98 h
- Geometric albedo: 0.223±0.008; 0.2995±0.056; 0.3243 (derived); 0.399±0.262
- Spectral type: S
- Absolute magnitude (H): 9.81 · 10.5 · 10.60 · 10.65±0.69

1503 Kuopio (provisional designation 1938 XD) is a stony Eunomian asteroid from the central region of the asteroid belt, approximately 19 kilometers in diameter. It was discovered on 15 December 1938, by astronomer Yrjö Väisälä at the Turku Observatory in Southwest Finland. The asteroid was named for the Finnish town of Kuopio.

== Orbit and classification ==
Kuopio is a member of the Eunomia family (502), a prominent family of stony S-type asteroid and the largest one in the intermediate main belt with more than 5,000 members. It orbits the Sun at a distance of 2.3–2.9 AU once every 4 years and 3 months (1,553 days). Its orbit has an eccentricity of 0.10 and an inclination of 12° with respect to the ecliptic plane.

The body's observation arc begins with its first identification as 1935 EF at Yerkes Observatory in March 1935, more than 3 years prior to its official discovery observation at Turku.

== Physical characteristics ==
=== Rotation period ===
Several rotational lightcurves of Kuopio were obtained from photometric observations since 2001. Analysis of these lightcurves gave a rotation period between 9.577 and 9.98 hours with a brightness variation of 0.01 to 0.05 magnitude (U=3/3/2/2/3).

=== Poles ===
In 2011 and 2013, a modeled lightcurve using data from the Uppsala Asteroid Photometric Catalogue (UAPC) and other sources was published. In both studies, the modeled lightcurve gave a concurring period 9.9586 hours. The 2013-publication also determined two spin axis of (170.0°, −86.0°) and (27.0°, −61.0°) in ecliptic coordinates (λ, β) (U=n.a.).

=== Diameter and albedo ===
According to the surveys carried out by the Infrared Astronomical Satellite IRAS, the Japanese Akari satellite and the NEOWISE mission of NASA's Wide-field Infrared Survey Explorer (WISE) program, Kuopio measures between 18.43 and 22.99 kilometers in diameter and its surface has an albedo between 0.223 and 0.399.

The Collaborative Asteroid Lightcurve Link derives an albedo of 0.3243 and a diameter of 18.54 kilometers based on an absolute magnitude of 10.5.

== Naming ==
This minor planet was named after the town of Kuopio in central Finland. The official naming citation was published by the Minor Planet Center on 20 February 1976 (M.P.C. 3928).
