= 1405 Sibelius =

Stony Florian asteroid

Discovery
- Discovered by: Y. Väisälä
- Discovery site: Turku Obs.
- Discovery date: 12 September 1936

Designations
- Named after: Jean Sibelius (Finnish composer)
- Alternative designations: 1936 RE · 1951 CO; 1953 VK_{3} · 1963 ST
- Minor planet category: main-belt · Flora

Orbital characteristics
- Epoch 4 September 2017 (JD 2458000.5)
- Uncertainty parameter 0
- Observation arc: 66.40 yr (24,254 days)
- Aphelion: 2.5817 AU
- Perihelion: 1.9215 AU
- Semi-major axis: 2.2516 AU
- Eccentricity: 0.1466
- Orbital period (sidereal): 3.38 yr (1,234 days)
- Mean anomaly: 312.34°
- Mean motion: 0° 17^{m} 30.12^{s} / day
- Inclination: 7.0301°
- Longitude of ascending node: 312.08°
- Argument of perihelion: 95.795°

Physical characteristics
- Dimensions: 6.21±0.35 km 6.810±0.098 km 7.175±0.089 km 7.20 km (taken); 7.204 km 9.26±1.95 km 12.18±1.1 km
- Synodic rotation period: 6.051±0.001 h (Note: Pravec (2007) web: rotation period 6.051±0.001 hours with a brightness amplitude of 0.11 mag. Summary figures for (1405) Sibelius at Collaborative Asteroid Lightcurve Link and Pravec, P.; Wolf, M.; Sarounova, L. (2007)) (Note: Lightcurve plot of (1405) Sibelius from October 2007; unpublished data.)
- Geometric albedo: 0.1432±0.029; 0.27±0.15; 0.3191; 0.3516±0.0646; 0.388±0.040; 0.458±0.068
- Spectral type: S
- Absolute magnitude (H): 12.03 (R) · 12.3 · 12.48 · 12.5 · 12.57±0.078 · 12.57±0.33

1405 Sibelius (provisional designation 1936 RE) is a stony Florian asteroid from the inner regions of the asteroid belt, approximately 8 kilometers in diameter. It was discovered on 12 September 1936, by Finnish astronomer Yrjö Väisälä at Turku Observatory in Southwest Finland. The asteroid was named after composer Jean Sibelius.

== Orbit and classification ==
Sibelius is a member of the Flora family, one of the largest populations of stony asteroids in the entire main-belt. It orbits the Sun in the inner main-belt at a distance of 1.9–2.6 AU once every 3 years and 5 months (1,234 days). Its orbit has an eccentricity of 0.15 and an inclination of 7° with respect to the ecliptic. The body's observation arc begins with an observation taken at Turku two weeks prior to its official discovery observation.

== Physical characteristics ==
Sibelius has been characterized as an S-type asteroid by the Pan-STARRS photometric survey.

=== Rotation period ===
In October 2007, a rotational lightcurve of Sibelius was obtained from photometric observations taken by Petr Pravec at the Ondřejov Observatory in the Czech Republic. Lightcurve analysis gave a rotation period of 6.051 hours with a brightness variation of 0.11 magnitude (U=3-).

=== Diameter and albedo ===
According to the surveys carried out by the Infrared Astronomical Satellite (IRAS) and NASA's Wide-field Infrared Survey Explorer (WISE) with its subsequent NEOWISE mission, Sibelius measures between 6.21 and 12.18 kilometres (3.86 and 7.57 mi) in diameter and its surface has an albedo between 0.14 and 0.48. The Collaborative Asteroid Lightcurve Link adopts an albedo of 0.3191 and a diameter of 7.20 kilometres (4.47 mi) from Petr Pravec's revised WISE thermal observations.

== Naming ==
This minor planet was named for Jean Sibelius (1865–1957), Finnish violinist and composer of the late Romantic and early-modern periods. The official naming citation was published by the Minor Planet Center on 20 February 1976 (M.P.C. 3928).
