= 1757 Porvoo =

Main-belt asteroid

Discovery
- Discovered by: Y. Väisälä
- Discovery site: Turku Obs.
- Discovery date: 17 March 1939

Designations
- Named after: Porvoo (Finnish city)
- Alternative designations: 1939 FC · 1964 BB; 1968 FK
- Minor planet category: main-belt · (inner)

Orbital characteristics
- Epoch 4 September 2017 (JD 2458000.5)
- Uncertainty parameter 0
- Observation arc: 77.87 yr (28,442 days)
- Aphelion: 2.6478 AU
- Perihelion: 2.0551 AU
- Semi-major axis: 2.3514 AU
- Eccentricity: 0.1260
- Orbital period (sidereal): 3.61 yr (1,317 days)
- Mean anomaly: 263.06°
- Mean motion: 0° 16^{m} 23.88^{s} / day
- Inclination: 3.9765°
- Longitude of ascending node: 39.423°
- Argument of perihelion: 149.40°
- Known satellites: 1 unconfirmed

Physical characteristics
- Dimensions: 6.32 km (calculated); 10.03±2.85 km 12.81±0.45 km
- Synodic rotation period: 4.89 h
- Geometric albedo: 0.049±0.004; 0.072±0.097; 0.073±0.082; 0.20 (assumed)
- Spectral type: S
- Absolute magnitude (H): 13.36 · 13.47 · 13.49±0.26

1757 Porvoo, provisional designation 1939 FC, is a presumably stony, and possible binary asteroid from the inner regions of the asteroid belt, approximately 10 kilometers in diameter. It was discovered on 17 March 1939, by Finnish astronomer Yrjö Väisälä at Turku Observatory on the coast of southwestern Finland. The asteroid was named for the Finnish city of Porvoo.

== Naming ==
This minor planet was named for Porvoo, a Finnish city and municipality located on the southern coast of Finland, and east of the capital Helsinki.

Porvoo is one of the six medieval towns in Finland, and is its second oldest city after Turku, location of the discovering observatory. In 1809, at the Diet of Porvoo, the Russian czar confirmed that Finland was annexed to the Russian empire as an autonomous nation. The official naming citation was published by the Minor Planet Center on 1 August 1980 (M.P.C. 5449).

== Orbit and classification ==
Porvoo orbits the Sun in the inner main-belt at a distance of 2.1–2.6 AU once every 3 years and 7 months (1,317 days). Its orbit has an eccentricity of 0.13 and an inclination of 4° with respect to the ecliptic. As no precoveries were taken, and no prior identifications were made, Porvoo's observation arc begins with its official discovery observation.

== Physical characteristics ==
=== Rotation period ===
In the early 1980s, a rotational lightcurve of Porvoo was obtained from photometric observations taken by American astronomer Richard P. Binzel using the 0.91- and 2.1-m telescopes at the University of Texas McDonald Observatory. It gave it a well-defined rotation period of 4.89 hours with a brightness variation of 0.30 magnitude (U=3).

=== Diameter and albedo ===
According to the surveys carried out by NASA's Wide-field Infrared Survey Explorer with its subsequent NEOWISE mission, Porvoo measures 10.03 and 12.81 kilometers in diameter, and its surface has an albedo of 0.049 and 0.073, respectively.

The Collaborative Asteroid Lightcurve Link assumes a standard albedo for stony asteroids of 0.20 – contrary to the rather carbonaceous albedo given by the space-based surveys – and calculates a diameter of 6.32 kilometers with an absolute magnitude of 13.36.

== Suspected satellite ==
During an occultation event on 7 July 2026, viewed by Blair Lade, Andrew Wendelborn, and Paul Martinaitis of the Astronomical Society of South Australia, Porvoo passed in front of the star UCAC4 312-094580. Data from the event was recorded by the three viewers from differing locations across Adelaide, and while Porvoo's shape was clearly visible to all three observations, Lade was the only one who managed to record another unexpected drop in the star's light.

Results from this event were officially reported on 26 September 2026, and further observations of Porvoo are said to help determine the existence of its natural satellite.
