= 1534 Näsi =

Carbonaceous asteroid

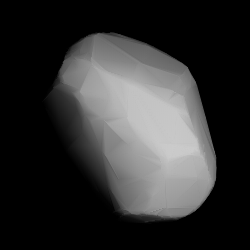
- Shape model of Näsi derived from its lightcurve

Discovery
- Discovered by: Y. Väisälä
- Discovery site: Turku Observatory
- Discovery date: 20 January 1939

Designations
- Named after: Näsijärvi (Finnish lake)
- Alternative designations: 1939 BK · 1933 UQ; 1957 EA · 1960 UB; 1962 JA · A915 VB; A924 WE · A924 YE
- Minor planet category: main-belt · (middle); Chloris

Orbital characteristics
- Epoch 4 September 2017 (JD 2458000.5)
- Uncertainty parameter 0
- Observation arc: 91.56 yr (33,443 days)
- Aphelion: 3.4155 AU
- Perihelion: 2.0404 AU
- Semi-major axis: 2.7279 AU
- Eccentricity: 0.2520
- Orbital period (sidereal): 4.51 yr (1,646 days)
- Mean anomaly: 174.04°
- Mean motion: 0° 13^{m} 7.68^{s} / day
- Inclination: 9.7942°
- Longitude of ascending node: 62.135°
- Argument of perihelion: 42.826°

Physical characteristics
- Dimensions: 18.32±5.21 km 19.51±0.36 km 19.92±0.65 km 22.11 km (derived); 22.12±0.9 km (IRAS:6); 27.52±6.50 km
- Synodic rotation period: 5.98±0.02 h 7.93161±0.00005 h 7.9338±0.0003 h 7.94±0.02 h 9.75 h
- Geometric albedo: 0.035±0.015; 0.07±0.01; 0.0721 (derived); 0.0754±0.006 (IRAS:6); 0.08±0.04; 0.100±0.004
- Spectral type: SMASS = Cgh · C
- Absolute magnitude (H): 11.7 · 11.75 · 11.80 · 11.88±0.24 · 11.9 · 11.93 · 11.96 · 12.05

1534 Näsi (provisional designation 1939 BK) is a carbonaceous asteroid from the middle region of the asteroid belt, approximately 20 kilometers in diameter.

It was discovered on 20 January 1939, by Finnish astronomer Yrjö Väisälä at Turku Observatory in Southwest Finland, and later named for the Finnish lake Näsijärvi.

== Orbit and classification ==
Näsi orbits the Sun in the central main-belt at a distance of 2.0–3.4 AU once every 4 years and 6 months (1,646 days). Its orbit has an eccentricity of 0.25 and an inclination of 10° with respect to the ecliptic. It was first identified as A915 VB at Simeiz Observatory in 1915. The body's observation arc begins 15 years prior to its official discovery with its identification as 1924 YE at Heidelberg Observatory.

== Physical characteristics ==
=== Lightcurve observations ===
In April 2007, the so-far best rated rotational lightcurve of Näsi was obtained by Jason Sauppe at Oakley Observatory in the United States. The lightcurve analysis gave a rotation period of 7.94 hours with a brightness variation of 0.35 magnitude (U=3-).

Periods from other photometric observations were obtained by astronomers René Roy in May 2016 (5.98 hours, Δ0.47 mag, U=2+), Giovanni de Sanctis in the 1990s (9.75 hours, Δ0.22 mag, U=2), Adrián Galád in October 2005 (7.9338 hours, Δ0.51 mag, U=2-), and a period of 7.93161 hours modeled from various data sources and published in 2016 (U=n.a.).

=== Spectral type, diameter and albedo ===
In the SMASS taxonomy, the carbonaceous C-type asteroid is also classified as a Cgh-subtype. According to the surveys carried out by the Infrared Astronomical Satellite IRAS, the Japanese Akari satellite, and NASA's Wide-field Infrared Survey Explorer with its subsequent NEOWISE mission, Näsi measures between 18.32 and 27.52 kilometers in diameter and its surface has an albedo between 0.035 and 0.100. The Collaborative Asteroid Lightcurve Link derives an albedo of 0.0721 and a diameter of 22.11 kilometers based on an absolute magnitude of 11.75.

== Naming ==
This minor planet is named for the large Finnish lake Näsijärvi, sometimes called "Näsi". It measures 256 square kilometers (99 sq mi) in size and is located only 95 metres above sea level. The official naming citation was published by the Minor Planet Center on 20 February 1976 (M.P.C. 3929).
