= 1659 Punkaharju =

Main-belt asteroid

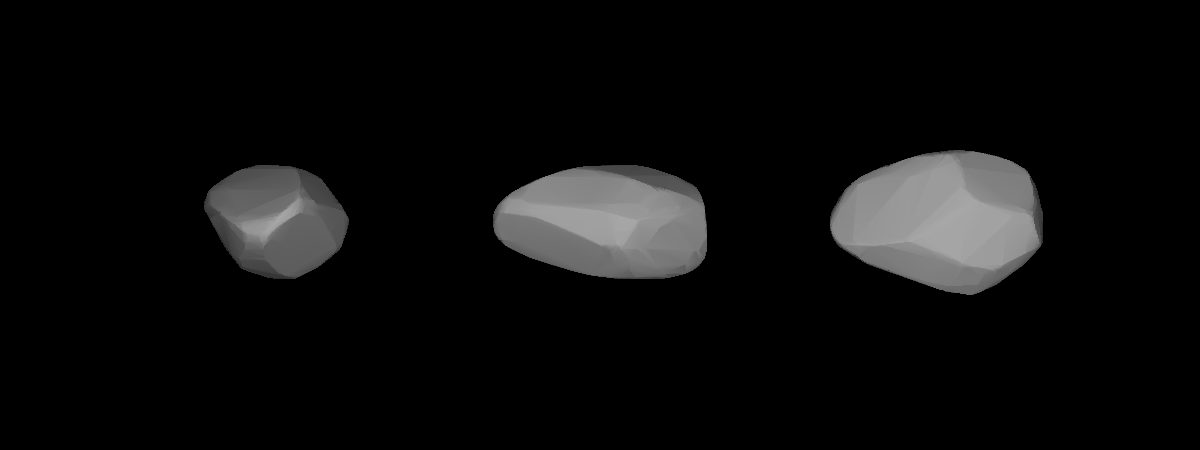
- Lightcurve-based 3D-model of Punkaharju

Discovery
- Discovered by: Y. Väisälä
- Discovery site: Turku Obs.
- Discovery date: 28 December 1940

Designations
- Named after: Punkaharju (region)
- Alternative designations: 1940 YL · 1930 QB; 1937 EB · 1944 RE; 1951 EG · 1953 NH; 1957 KO · 1958 TS_{1}
- Minor planet category: main-belt · (middle); Postrema

Orbital characteristics
- Epoch 4 September 2017 (JD 2458000.5)
- Uncertainty parameter 0
- Observation arc: 86.68 yr (31,660 days)
- Aphelion: 3.5066 AU
- Perihelion: 2.0646 AU
- Semi-major axis: 2.7856 AU
- Eccentricity: 0.2588
- Orbital period (sidereal): 4.65 yr (1,698 days)
- Mean anomaly: 243.68°
- Mean motion: 0° 12^{m} 43.2^{s} / day
- Inclination: 16.426°
- Longitude of ascending node: 338.26°
- Argument of perihelion: 36.257°

Physical characteristics
- Dimensions: 28.010±0.599 km 28.24±1.54 km 31.21±2.9 km 31.41 km (derived)
- Synodic rotation period: 5.01±0.02 h 5.01±0.01 h 5.01327±0.00005 h 5.0138±0.0002 h 5.028±0.007 h
- Geometric albedo: 0.1654±0.035; 0.1963 (derived); 0.202±0.024; 0.271±0.040
- Spectral type: SMASS = S · S
- Absolute magnitude (H): 9.80 · 9.9 · 10.1 · 10.42±0.35

1659 Punkaharju, provisional designation 1940 YL, is a stony Postremian asteroid from the middle region of the asteroid belt, approximately 30 kilometers in diameter. It was discovered on 28 December 1940, by Finnish astronomer Yrjö Väisälä at Turku Observatory in Southwest Finland. It is named for the municipality of Punkaharju.

== Orbit ==
Punkaharju is a member of the Postrema family (541), a mid-sized central asteroid family of little more than 100 members. The S-type asteroid orbits the Sun at a distance of 2.1–3.5 AU once every 4 years and 8 months (1,698 days). Its orbit has an eccentricity of 0.26 and an inclination of 16° with respect to the ecliptic. Punkaharju was first identified as 1930 QB at Uccle Observatory in 1930, extending the body's observation arc by 10 years prior to its official discovery observation.

== Rotation period ==
Between 2000 and 2011, several rotational lightcurves of Punkaharju were obtained from photometric observations by astronomers Brian Warner and Pierre Antonini. They gave a well-defined rotation period of 5.01 hours with a brightness variation between 0.26 and 0.43 magnitude (U=3/3/3). In addition, a concurring period of 5.01327 hours was published in 2016, using the Uppsala Asteroid Photometric Catalogue as the main-data source. French CCD-specialist Cyril Cavadore also derived a less secure period of 5.028 hours from his observations in October 2005 (U=2-).

== Diameter and albedo ==
According to the surveys carried out by the Infrared Astronomical Satellite IRAS, the Japanese Akari satellite, and NASA's Wide-field Infrared Survey Explorer with its subsequent NEOWISE mission, the asteroid measures between 28.01 and 31.21 kilometers in diameter, and its surface has an albedo between 0.165 and 0.271. The Collaborative Asteroid Lightcurve Link derives an albedo of 0.196 and a diameter of 31.41 kilometers using an absolute magnitude of 9.9.

== Naming ==
This minor planet is named for the former municipality of Punkaharju, an isthmus region in southeastern Finland (also see Karelian Isthmus). The official naming citation was published by the Minor Planet Center on 20 February 1976 (M.P.C. 3933).
