= 1518 Rovaniemi =

Main-belt asteroid

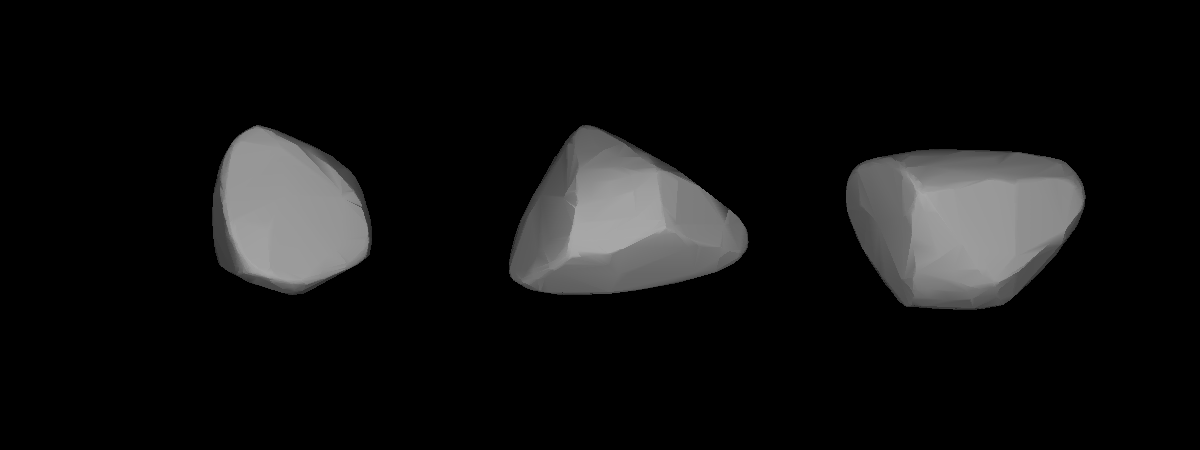
- Lightcurve-based 3D-model of Rovaniemi

Discovery
- Discovered by: Y. Väisälä
- Discovery site: Turku Obs.
- Discovery date: 15 October 1938

Designations
- Named after: Rovaniemi (Finnish city)
- Alternative designations: 1938 UA · 1928 TL; 1951 SH
- Minor planet category: main-belt · (inner); Flora

Orbital characteristics
- Epoch 4 September 2017 (JD 2458000.5)
- Uncertainty parameter 0
- Observation arc: 88.74 yr (32,412 days)
- Aphelion: 2.5449 AU
- Perihelion: 1.9053 AU
- Semi-major axis: 2.2251 AU
- Eccentricity: 0.1437
- Orbital period (sidereal): 3.32 yr (1,212 days)
- Mean anomaly: 246.56°
- Mean motion: 0° 17^{m} 49.2^{s} / day
- Inclination: 6.7137°
- Longitude of ascending node: 27.804°
- Argument of perihelion: 37.101°

Physical characteristics
- Dimensions: 7.46±1.30 km 7.76±0.71 km 8.480±0.167 km 8.98 km (calculated); 9.019±0.070 km
- Synodic rotation period: 5.247±0.001 h 5.249±0.002 h
- Geometric albedo: 0.24 (assumed); 0.2631±0.0374; 0.295±0.063; 0.31±0.17; 0.340±0.195
- Spectral type: S
- Absolute magnitude (H): 12.3 · 12.34 · 12.4 · 12.68

1518 Rovaniemi (provisional designation 1938 UA) is a stony Florian asteroid from the inner regions of the asteroid belt, approximately 8 kilometers in diameter. Discovered by Yrjö Väisälä at the Turku Observatory in 1938, the asteroid was later named after the Finnish city of Rovaniemi.

== Discovery ==
Rovaniemi was discovered on 15 October 1938, by Finnish astronomer Yrjö Väisälä at the Turku Observatory in Southwest Finland. Six nights later, it was independently discovered by Belgian astronomer Eugène Delporte at Uccle Observatory on 21 October 1938. The Minor Planet Center, however, only recognizes the first discoverer.

The asteroid was first identified as 1928 TL at Simeiz Observatory on 7 October 1928. (Note: Alternatively to the Simeiz Observatory, it is also possible that observations at the Italian Turin Observatory on 13 and 14 October 1928, lead to the assignment of Rovaniemi's first provisional designation, 1928 TL.) The body's observation arc begins two weeks later at Simeiz on 21 October 1928, almost 10 years prior to the asteroid's official discovery observation at Turku.

== Orbit and classification ==
Rovaniemi is a member of the Flora family (402), a giant asteroid family and the largest family of stony asteroids in the main-belt. It orbits the Sun in the inner main-belt at a distance of 1.9–2.5 AU once every 3 years and 4 months (1,212 days). Its orbit has an eccentricity of 0.14 and an inclination of 7° with respect to the ecliptic.

== Physical characteristics ==
Rovaniemi is an assumed stony S-type asteroid, which corresponds to the overall spectral type of the Flora family.

=== Rotation period ===
In January 2009, two rotational lightcurves of Rovaniemi were obtained from photometric observations by René Roy at Blauvac Observatory (627) in France, and by Brian Warner at the Palmer Divide Observatory (716) in Colorado, United States. Lightcurve analysis gave a rotation period of 5.247 and 5.249 hours with a brightness amplitude of 0.26 and 0.25 magnitude, respectively (U=2+/3).

=== Spin axis ===
In 2013, an international study modeled Rovaniemi's lightcurve from various data sources, including the Uppsala Asteroid Photometric Catalogue and the Palomar Transient Factory survey. The lightcurve gave a concurring period of 5.25047 hours and allowed for the determination of two spin axis of (62.0°, 60.0°) and (265.0°, 45.0°) in ecliptic coordinates (λ, β).

=== Diameter and albedo ===
According to the survey carried out by the NEOWISE mission of NASA's Wide-field Infrared Survey Explorer, Rovaniemi measures between 7.46 and 9.019 kilometers in diameter and its surface has an albedo between 0.2631 and 0.340.

The Collaborative Asteroid Lightcurve Link assumes an albedo of 0.24 – derived from 8 Flora, the Flora family's largest member and namesake – and calculates a diameter of 8.98 kilometers based on an absolute magnitude of 12.4.

== Naming ==
This minor planet was named after the Finnish city of Rovaniemi, located just six kilometers south of the Arctic Circle. The official naming citation was published by the Minor Planet Center on 20 February 1976 (M.P.C. 3929).
