= 1740 Paavo Nurmi =

Rare-type main-belt asteroid

Discovery
- Discovered by: Y. Väisälä
- Discovery site: Turku Obs.
- Discovery date: 18 October 1939

Designations
- Named after: Paavo Nurmi (Sports Legend)
- Alternative designations: 1939 UA · 1933 DD; 1951 YO_{2} · 1954 NC; 1966 TA
- Minor planet category: main-belt · (inner)

Orbital characteristics
- Epoch 4 September 2017 (JD 2458000.5)
- Uncertainty parameter 0
- Observation arc: 77.13 yr (28,172 days)
- Aphelion: 2.9385 AU
- Perihelion: 1.9947 AU
- Semi-major axis: 2.4666 AU
- Eccentricity: 0.1913
- Orbital period (sidereal): 3.87 yr (1,415 days)
- Mean anomaly: 43.639°
- Mean motion: 0° 15^{m} 15.84^{s} / day
- Inclination: 1.9994°
- Longitude of ascending node: 296.10°
- Argument of perihelion: 78.724°

Physical characteristics
- Dimensions: 12.762±0.150 km
- Geometric albedo: 0.046±0.006
- Spectral type: Tholen = F B–V = 0.613; U–B = 0.194
- Absolute magnitude (H): 13.24

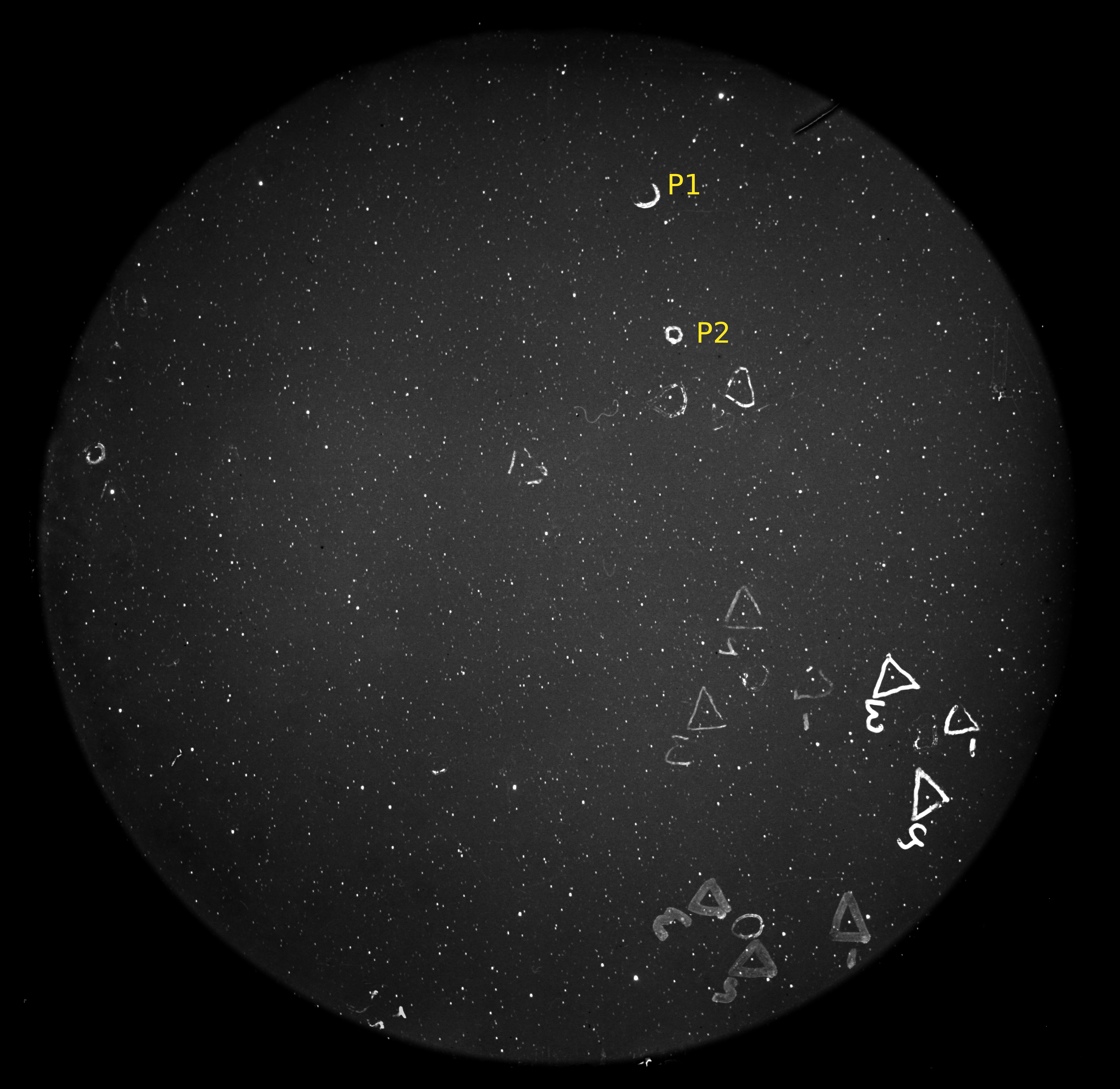
1740 Paavo Nurmi discovery plate

1740 Paavo Nurmi, provisional designation 1939 UA, is rare-type asteroid from the inner regions of the asteroid belt, approximately 13 kilometers in diameter.

It was discovered on 18 October 1939, by Finnish astronomer Yrjö Väisälä at Turku Observatory in Southwest Finland. It was named after Finnish distance runner Paavo Nurmi.

== Orbit and classification ==
Paavo Nurmi orbits the Sun in the inner main-belt at a distance of 2.0–2.9 AU once every 3 years and 10 months (1,415 days). Its orbit has an eccentricity of 0.19 and an inclination of 2° with respect to the ecliptic.

The asteroid was first identified as 1933 DD at Heidelberg Observatory in 1933. This observation, however, remained unused and the body's observation arc begins with its official discovery observation at Turku in 1939.

== Physical characteristics ==
On the Tholen taxonomic scheme, Paavo Nurmi has been characterized as a rare F-type asteroid, a subtype of the carbonaceous asteroids, which are common in the outer, but not in the inner main-belt.

Paavo Nurmi has an absolute magnitude of 13.24. According to the survey carried out by NASA's Wide-field Infrared Survey Explorer with its subsequent NEOWISE mission, the asteroid measures 12.76 kilometers in diameter, and its surface has an albedo of 0.046. As of 2017, its rotation period and shape remain unknown.

== Naming ==
This minor planet was named for famed Turku-born Finnish distance runner Paavo Nurmi, also known as The Flying Finn, who won nine Olympic gold medals and set 22 official world records at distances between 1,500 metres and 20 kilometres. The official naming citation was published by the Minor Planet Center on 1 April 1980 (M.P.C. 5281).
