= 1928 Summa =

Stony main-belt asteroid

Discovery
- Discovered by: Y. Väisälä
- Discovery site: Turku Obs.
- Discovery date: 21 September 1938

Designations
- Named after: Finnish village (Battle of Summa)
- Alternative designations: 1938 SO · 1969 PA
- Minor planet category: main-belt · (inner)

Orbital characteristics
- Epoch 4 September 2017 (JD 2458000.5)
- Uncertainty parameter 0
- Observation arc: 78.38 yr (28,628 days)
- Aphelion: 2.9797 AU
- Perihelion: 1.9733 AU
- Semi-major axis: 2.4765 AU
- Eccentricity: 0.2032
- Orbital period (sidereal): 3.90 yr (1,423 days)
- Mean anomaly: 98.003°
- Mean motion: 0° 15^{m} 10.44^{s} / day
- Inclination: 4.5756°
- Longitude of ascending node: 180.42°
- Argument of perihelion: 157.80°

Physical characteristics
- Dimensions: 8.34 km (derived); 9.333±0.170 km
- Synodic rotation period: 6.8549±0.0006 h 6.855±0.001 h 9.66 h (dated)
- Geometric albedo: 0.160±0.043; 0.20 (assumed)
- Spectral type: S B–V = 1.010
- Absolute magnitude (H): 12.68 · 12.76 · 13.20±0.85

1928 Summa, provisional designation 1938 SO, is a stony asteroid from the inner regions of the asteroid belt, approximately 9 kilometers in diameter.

It was discovered on 21 September 1938, by Finnish astronomer Yrjö Väisälä at Turku Observatory in Southwest Finland. It was named for a Finnish village where the Battle of Summa took place.

== Orbit and classification ==
Summa is a S-type asteroid that orbits the Sun in the inner main-belt at a distance of 2.0–3.0 AU once every 3 years and 11 months (1,423 days). Its orbit has an eccentricity of 0.20 and an inclination of 5° with respect to the ecliptic. The body's observation arc begins at Turku one night after its official discovery observation, with no precoveries taken, and no prior identifications made.

== Rotation period ==
In March 1984, the first but poorly rated rotational lightcurve of Summa was obtained from photometric observations by American astronomer Richard Binzel. It gave a rotation period of 9.66 hours with a brightness amplitude of 0.14 magnitude (U=1).

In August 2012, a refined yet ambiguous lightcurve with a period of 6.855 hours and an amplitude of 0.13 was obtained by Larry E. Owings at the Barnes Ridge Observatory in California (U=2+). Lightcurve analysis also considered that Summa might be a binary system. One month later, the so-far best rated lightcurve from British astronomer Kevin Hills using the remote controlled Riverland Dingo Observatory in Australia, gave a period of 6.8549 hours with a brightness amplitude of 0.18 (U=3).

== Diameter an albedo ==
According to the survey carried out by NASA's Wide-field Infrared Survey Explorer with its subsequent NEOWISE mission, Summa measures 9.333 kilometers in diameter and its surface has an albedo of 0.160, while the Collaborative Asteroid Lightcurve Link assumes a standard albedo for stony asteroids of 0.20 and calculates a diameter of 8.34 kilometers with an absolute magnitude of 12.76.

== Naming ==
This minor planet was named after the village on the Karelian Isthmus, where the Battle of Summa took place during the Finnish Winter War (1939–1940). The approved naming citation was published by the Minor Planet Center on 1 August 1980 (M.P.C. 5450). Most of Yrjö Väisälä's discoveries have names that relate in one way or another to this military conflict between Finland and the Soviet Union during World War II.
