= 1477 Bonsdorffia =

Main-belt asteroid

Discovery
- Discovered by: Y. Väisälä
- Discovery site: Turku Obs.
- Discovery date: 6 February 1938

Designations
- Named after: Ilmari Bonsdorff (Finnish astronomer)
- Alternative designations: 1938 CC · 1959 WD
- Minor planet category: main-belt · (outer) background

Orbital characteristics
- Epoch 4 September 2017 (JD 2458000.5)
- Uncertainty parameter 0
- Observation arc: 63.72 yr (23,274 days)
- Aphelion: 4.0797 AU
- Perihelion: 2.3192 AU
- Semi-major axis: 3.1994 AU
- Eccentricity: 0.2751
- Orbital period (sidereal): 5.72 yr (2,090 days)
- Mean anomaly: 69.903°
- Mean motion: 0° 10^{m} 19.92^{s} / day
- Inclination: 15.713°
- Longitude of ascending node: 320.65°
- Argument of perihelion: 103.38°

Physical characteristics
- Dimensions: 25.85±0.39 km 28.10±1.3 km 29.13±8.63 km 35.87±0.66 km
- Synodic rotation period: 7.5 h (Note: Durkee (2011) web: rotation period 7.5 hours with a brightness amplitude of 0.01 mag. Summary figures for (1477) Bonsdorffia at LCDB and SOS Observatory website (archived)); 7.8±0.1 h (Note: Aznar (2011) web: rotation period 7.8±0.1 hours with a brightness amplitude of 0.32 mag. Summary figures for (1477) Bonsdorffia at LCDB and Aznar's website (archived))
- Geometric albedo: 0.033±0.001; 0.043±0.019; 0.0517±0.005; 0.06±0.05
- Spectral type: Tholen = XU; B–V = 0.733
- Absolute magnitude (H): 11.09±0.30 · 11.39 · 11.59 · 11.97

1477 Bonsdorffia, provisional designation 1938 CC, is a background asteroid from the outer regions of the asteroid belt, approximately 29 kilometers in diameter. It was discovered on 6 February 1938, by astronomer Yrjö Väisälä at the Iso-Heikkilä Observatory in Turku, Finland. The asteroid was named after Finnish astronomer Ilmari Bonsdorff, who founded the Finnish Geodetic Institute.

== Orbit and classification ==
Bonsdorffia is a non-family asteroid of the main belt's background population. It orbits the Sun in the outer main-belt at a distance of 2.3–4.1 AU once every 5 years and 9 months (2,090 days). Its orbit has an eccentricity of 0.28 and an inclination of 16° with respect to the ecliptic. The body's observation arc begins 11 days prior to its official discovery observation at Turku.

== Physical characteristics ==
In the Tholen classification, Bonsdorffia is an X-type asteroid with an unusual spectrum (XU).

=== Rotation period ===
In December 2010, a rotational lightcurve of Bonsdorffia was obtained from photometric observations by astronomer Amadeo Aznar at his Puzol Observatory in Spain (J42). Lightcurve analysis gave a rotation period of 7.8 hours with a brightness amplitude of 0.32 magnitude (U=2). Another lightcurve by Richard Durkee at the SOS Observatory (H39) gave a similar period of 7.5 hours (U=1).

=== Diameter and albedo ===
According to the surveys carried out by the Infrared Astronomical Satellite IRAS, the Japanese Akari satellite and the NEOWISE mission of NASA's Wide-field Infrared Survey Explorer, Bonsdorffia measures between 25.85 and 35.87 kilometers in diameter and its surface has an albedo between 0.033 and 0.06.

The Collaborative Asteroid Lightcurve Link adopts the results obtained by IRAS, that is, an albedo of 0.0517 and a diameter of 28.10 kilometers based on an absolute magnitude of 11.59.

== Naming ==
This minor planet was named after Ilmari Bonsdorff (1879–1950), Finnish astronomer and founder and director of the Finnish Geodetic Institute. The official naming citation was mentioned in The Names of the Minor Planets by Paul Herget in 1955 (H 132).
