= 1499 Pori =

Asteroid

Discovery
- Discovered by: Y. Väisälä
- Discovery site: Turku Obs.
- Discovery date: 16 October 1938

Designations
- Named after: Pori (Finnish city)
- Alternative designations: 1938 UF · 1951 RU_{1} 1959 NA
- Minor planet category: main-belt · (middle); Eunomia

Orbital characteristics
- Epoch 4 September 2017 (JD 2458000.5)
- Uncertainty parameter 0
- Observation arc: 74.34 yr (27,154 days)
- Aphelion: 3.1679 AU
- Perihelion: 2.1729 AU
- Semi-major axis: 2.6704 AU
- Eccentricity: 0.1863
- Orbital period (sidereal): 4.36 yr (1,594 days)
- Mean anomaly: 80.655°
- Mean motion: 0° 13^{m} 33.24^{s} / day
- Inclination: 12.180°
- Longitude of ascending node: 239.62°
- Argument of perihelion: 74.926°

Physical characteristics
- Dimensions: 13.37±0.89 km 13.995±0.401 km 14.896±0.348 km 14.90±0.35 km 15.22 km (calculated)
- Synodic rotation period: 3.3557±0.0004 h 3.36±0.01 h 3.36±0.01 h 3.36±0.05 h
- Geometric albedo: 0.21 (assumed); 0.240±0.033; 0.2986±0.0581; 0.330±0.046
- Spectral type: S (assumed)
- Absolute magnitude (H): 11.20 · 11.30 · 11.4

1499 Pori, provisional designation 1938 UF, is a stony Eunomian asteroid from the central regions of the asteroid belt, approximately 15 kilometers in diameter. It was discovered on 16 October 1938, by Finnish astronomer Yrjö Väisälä at the Turku Observatory in southwest Finland. The asteroid was named after the Finnish city of Pori.

== Orbit and classification ==
Pori is a member of the Eunomia family (502), a prominent family of stony asteroids and the largest one in the intermediate main belt with more than 5,000 members. It orbits the Sun in the central main belt at a distance of 2.2–3.2 AU once every 4 years and 4 months (1,594 days). Its orbit has an eccentricity of 0.19 and an inclination of 12° with respect to the ecliptic. The body's observation arc begins with its official discovery observation at Turku in October 1938.

== Physical characteristics ==
Pori is an assumed S-type asteroid which corresponds to the Eunomia family's overall spectral type.

=== Rotation period ===
Several rotational lightcurves of Pori have been obtained from photometric observations since 2003.

In August 2003, photometric observations made by Robert Stephens at the Santana Observatory (646) in California, gave a synodic rotation period of 3.36 hours. The lightcurve shows a brightness variation of 0.28 in magnitude (U=3). In August 2016, another lightcurve by Maurice Audejean gave a refined rotation period of 3.3557 hours with an amplitude of 0.34 magnitude (U=3).

=== Diameter and albedo ===
According to the surveys carried out by the Japanese Akari satellite and the NEOWISE mission of NASA's Wide-field Infrared Survey Explorer, Pori measures between 13.37 and 14.90 kilometers in diameter and its surface has an albedo between 0.240 and 0.330.

The Collaborative Asteroid Lightcurve Link assumes a standard albedo of 0.21 – derived from 15 Eunomia, the largest member and namesake of the Eunomia family – and calculates a diameter of 15.22 kilometers based on an absolute magnitude of 11.4.

== Naming ==
This minor planet was named after the city of Pori, located near the Gulf of Bothnia in Finland. The official naming citation was published by the Minor Planet Center on 20 February 1976 (M.P.C. 3928).
