= 1496 Turku =

Asteroid

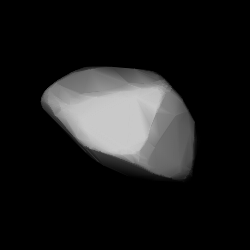
- Shape of Turku modelled from its lightcurve

Discovery
- Discovered by: Y. Väisälä
- Discovery site: Turku Obs.
- Discovery date: 22 September 1938

Designations
- Named after: Turku (Finnish city)
- Alternative designations: 1938 SA_{1} · 1928 QN; 1928 RE · 1950 EC; 1954 MH · 1957 HB
- Minor planet category: main-belt · (inner); Flora · background

Orbital characteristics
- Epoch 4 September 2017 (JD 2458000.5)
- Uncertainty parameter 0
- Observation arc: 88.02 yr (32,148 days)
- Aphelion: 2.5631 AU
- Perihelion: 1.8490 AU
- Semi-major axis: 2.2060 AU
- Eccentricity: 0.1619
- Orbital period (sidereal): 3.28 yr (1,197 days)
- Mean anomaly: 90.547°
- Mean motion: 0° 18^{m} 2.88^{s} / day
- Inclination: 2.5005°
- Longitude of ascending node: 294.38°
- Argument of perihelion: 0.9272°

Physical characteristics
- Dimensions: 7.47±0.31 km 7.758±0.072 km 7.973±0.018 km 8.19 km (calculated)
- Synodic rotation period: 6.47±0.01 h 6.47375±0.00001 h
- Geometric albedo: 0.1930±0.0196; 0.203±0.024; 0.24 (assumed); 0.347±0.043
- Spectral type: S (assumed)
- Absolute magnitude (H): 12.40 · 12.42±0.25 · 12.6 · 12.9

1496 Turku, provisional designation 1938 SA_{1}, is a Florian asteroid from the inner regions of the asteroid belt, approximately 8 kilometers in diameter. It was discovered on 22 September 1938, by astronomer Yrjö Väisälä at the Iso-Heikkilä Observatory in Turku, Finland. The asteroid was named for the Finnish city of Turku.

== Orbit and classification ==
Turku is a member of the Flora family (402), a giant asteroid family and the largest family of stony asteroids in the main belt. It is, however, a non-family asteroid from the main belt's background population when applying the Hierarchical Clustering Method to its proper orbital elements.

It orbits the Sun in the inner main-belt at a distance of 1.8–2.6 AU once every 3 years and 3 months (1,197 days). Its orbit has an eccentricity of 0.16 and an inclination of 3° with respect to the ecliptic. The body's observation arc begins with its first identification as 1928 QN at Johannesburg Observatory in August 1928, more than 10 years prior to its official discovery observation at Turku.

== Physical characteristics ==
Turku is an assumed S-type asteroid, which is also the Flora family's overall spectral type.

=== Rotation period and poles ===
In April 2006, a rotational lightcurve of Turku was obtained from photometric observations by French amateur astronomer Laurent Bernasconi. Lightcurve analysis gave a rotation period of 6.47 hours with a brightness amplitude of 0.51 magnitude, indicative of a non-spherical shape (U=3-).

A 2016-published lightcurve, using modeled photometric data from the Lowell Photometric Database, gave a concurring period of 6.47375 hours, as well as a spin axis of (75.0°, −75.0°) in ecliptic coordinates (λ, β).

=== Diameter and albedo ===
According to the survey carried out by the NEOWISE mission of NASA's Wide-field Infrared Survey Explorer, Turku measures between 7.47 and 7.973 kilometers in diameter and its surface has an albedo between 0.1930 and 0.347.

The Collaborative Asteroid Lightcurve Link assumes an albedo of 0.24 – derived from 8 Flora, the largest member and namesake of the Flora family – and calculates a diameter of 8.19 kilometers based on an absolute magnitude of 12.6.

== Naming ==
This minor planet was named after Finnish city of Turku, location of the discovering observatory and home of the discoverer Yrjö Väisälä. In ancient times, Turku was the capital of Finland. The official naming citation was published by the Minor Planet Center in January 1956 (M.P.C. 1350).
