= 1524 Joensuu =

Asteroid

Discovery
- Discovered by: Y. Väisälä
- Discovery site: Turku Obs.
- Discovery date: 18 September 1939

Designations
- Named after: Joensuu (Finnish town)
- Alternative designations: 1939 SB · 1931 EL; 1933 QO · 1936 DG; 1958 DH_{1}
- Minor planet category: main-belt · (outer)

Orbital characteristics
- Epoch 4 September 2017 (JD 2458000.5)
- Uncertainty parameter 0
- Observation arc: 85.95 yr (31,395 days)
- Aphelion: 3.4881 AU
- Perihelion: 2.7300 AU
- Semi-major axis: 3.1090 AU
- Eccentricity: 0.1219
- Orbital period (sidereal): 5.48 yr (2,002 days)
- Mean anomaly: 88.699°
- Mean motion: 0° 10^{m} 47.28^{s} / day
- Inclination: 12.687°
- Longitude of ascending node: 347.72°
- Argument of perihelion: 2.7611°

Physical characteristics
- Dimensions: 39.37±12.22 km 42.79±1.1 km 42.83 km (derived); 44.87±0.78 km 45.056±0.291 km 49.394±0.502 km
- Synodic rotation period: 9.276±0.007 h
- Geometric albedo: 0.0347±0.0053; 0.043±0.002; 0.0462±0.002; 0.050±0.008; 0.0505 (derived); 0.064±0.007; 0.07±0.05
- Spectral type: C
- Absolute magnitude (H): 10.56±0.50 · 10.60 · 10.7 · 10.78 · 10.8

1524 Joensuu (provisional designation 1939 SB) is a carbonaceous asteroid from the outer region of the asteroid belt, approximately 42 kilometers in diameter. It was discovered on 18 September 1939, by Finnish astronomer Yrjö Väisälä at Turku Observatory in Southwest Finland, and named for the town of Joensuu.

== Classification and orbit ==
Joensuu is a dark C-type asteroid, that orbits the Sun in the outer main-belt at a distance of 2.7–3.5 AU once every 5 years and 6 months (2,002 days). Its orbit has an eccentricity of 0.12 and an inclination of 13° with respect to the ecliptic. In 1931, Joensuu was first identified as 1931 EL at Heidelberg Observatory, extending the body's observation arc by 8 years prior to its official discovery observation.

== Physical characteristics ==
In October 2005, a rotational lightcurve of Joensuu was obtained from photometric observations by French amateur astronomer Laurent Bernasconi. It gave a well-defined rotation period of 9.276 hours with a change in brightness of 0.33 magnitude (U=3).

According to the surveys carried out by the Infrared Astronomical Satellite IRAS, the Japanese Akari satellite, and NASA's Wide-field Infrared Survey Explorer with its subsequent NEOWISE mission, Joensuu measures between 39.37 and 49.39 kilometers in diameter, and its surface has an albedo between 0.034 and 0.07. The Collaborative Asteroid Lightcurve Link derives an albedo of 0.0505 and a diameter of 42.83 kilometers using an absolute magnitude of 10.7.

== Naming ==
This minor planet was named for the Finnish town Joensuu, where the discoverer received his early schooling. It is located in North Karelia, near the Russian border. The official naming citation was published by the Minor Planet Center on 20 February 1976 (M.P.C. 3929).
