= 1525 Savonlinna =

Main-belt asteroid

Discovery
- Discovered by: Y. Väisälä
- Discovery site: Turku Obs.
- Discovery date: 18 September 1939

Designations
- Named after: Savonlinna (Finnish town)
- Alternative designations: 1939 SC · 1930 SE
- Minor planet category: main-belt · (middle)

Orbital characteristics
- Epoch 4 September 2017 (JD 2458000.5)
- Uncertainty parameter 0
- Observation arc: 86.61 yr (31,635 days)
- Aphelion: 3.4104 AU
- Perihelion: 1.9885 AU
- Semi-major axis: 2.6995 AU
- Eccentricity: 0.2634
- Orbital period (sidereal): 4.44 yr (1,620 days)
- Mean anomaly: 235.57°
- Mean motion: 0° 13^{m} 19.92^{s} / day
- Inclination: 5.8589°
- Longitude of ascending node: 279.06°
- Argument of perihelion: 64.806°

Physical characteristics
- Dimensions: 11.73±2.63 km 12.06 km (derived); 12.18 km (IRAS); 12.23±3.39 km 12.233±0.140 km
- Synodic rotation period: 14.634±0.002 h 22.8406±0.0296 h
- Geometric albedo: 0.045±0.027; 0.07±0.04; 0.0840 (derived); 0.09±0.10; 0.1306±0.020 (IRAS)
- Spectral type: S
- Absolute magnitude (H): 12.80 · 12.87±0.15 · 12.9 · 12.901±0.003 (R) · 13.07 · 13.54

1525 Savonlinna (provisional designation 1939 SC) is an asteroid from the central region of the asteroid belt, approximately 12 kilometers in diameter. It was discovered on 18 September 1939, by Finnish astronomer Yrjö Väisälä at the Turku Observatory in southwestern Finland. It was later named after the eastern Finnish town Savonlinna.

== Orbit and classification ==
Savonlinna orbits the Sun in the central main-belt at a distance of 2.0–3.4 AU once every 4 years and 5 months (1,620 days). Its orbit has an eccentricity of 0.26 and an inclination of 6° with respect to the ecliptic. It was first identified as 1930 SE at Simeiz Observatory, extending the body's arc length by 9 years prior to its official discovery observation at Turku.

== Physical characteristics ==
=== Rotational period ===
In October and December 2010, two rotational lightcurves of Savonlinna were obtained by Gordon Gartrelle at UND and the Palomar Transient Factory in California. Lightcurve analysis gave a divergent rotation period of 14.634 and 22.8406 hours with a brightness variation of 0.52 and 0.50 magnitude, respectively (U=2/2).

=== Diameter and albedo ===
According to the surveys carried out by the Infrared Astronomical Satellite IRAS, and NASA's Wide-field Infrared Survey Explorer with its subsequent NEOWISE mission, Savonlinna measures between 11.73 and 12.23 kilometers in diameter and its surface has an albedo between 0.045 and 0.130. The Collaborative Asteroid Lightcurve Link derives an albedo of 0.084 and a diameter of 12.06 kilometers based on an absolute magnitude of 12.9. It also classifies the body as a S-type asteroid, despite its derived albedo.

== Naming ==
This minor planet was named for the eastern Finnish town Savonlinna, located in the heart of the Saimaa lake region. The official naming citation was published by the Minor Planet Center on 20 February 1976 (M.P.C. 3929).
