= 293 Brasilia =

Main-belt asteroid

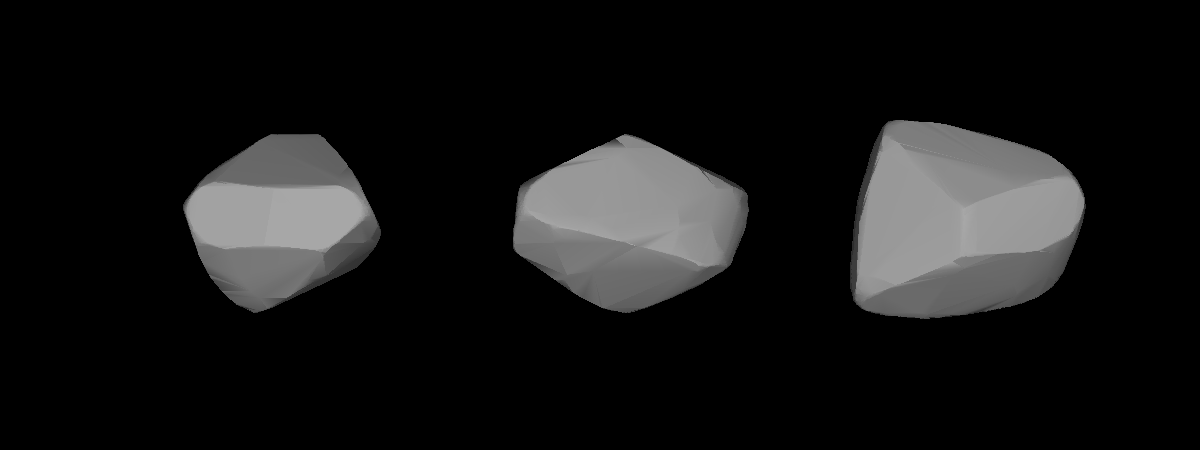
- Lightcurve-based 3D model of 293 Brasilia

Discovery
- Discovered by: Auguste Charlois
- Discovery date: 20 May 1890

Designations
- Pronunciation: /brəˈzɪliə/
- Named after: Brazil
- Alternative designations: A890 KA, 1909 HB
- Minor planet category: main-belt · (outer); Brasilia

Orbital characteristics
- Epoch 31 July 2016 (JD 2457600.5)
- Uncertainty parameter 0
- Observation arc: 106.96 yr (39067 d)
- Aphelion: 3.1657 AU (473.58 Gm)
- Perihelion: 2.55398 AU (382.070 Gm)
- Semi-major axis: 2.85982 AU (427.823 Gm)
- Eccentricity: 0.10694
- Orbital period (sidereal): 4.84 yr (1766.5 d)
- Average orbital speed: 17.61 km/s
- Mean anomaly: 107.972°
- Mean motion: 0° 12^{m} 13.68^{s} / day
- Inclination: 15.583°
- Longitude of ascending node: 61.316°
- Argument of perihelion: 86.852°
- Earth MOID: 1.62263 AU (242.742 Gm)
- Jupiter MOID: 2.02111 AU (302.354 Gm)
- T_{Jupiter}: 3.239

Physical characteristics
- Dimensions: 55.11±1.6 km
- Synodic rotation period: 8.17 h (0.340 d)
- Geometric albedo: 0.0615±0.004
- Absolute magnitude (H): 9.94

293 Brasilia is a large Main belt asteroid that was discovered by French astronomer Auguste Charlois on 20 May 1890 in Nice. It is the namesake of the Brasilia family, a smaller asteroid family of X-type asteroids in the outer main-belt. However, Brasilia is a suspected interloper in its own family.

Photometric observations of this asteroid at the Leura Observatory in Leura, Australia during 2006 gave a light curve with a period of 8.173 ± 0.002 hours and a brightness variation of 0.20 ± 0.03 in magnitude.
