= Yrjö Väisälä =

Finnish astronomer (1891–1971)

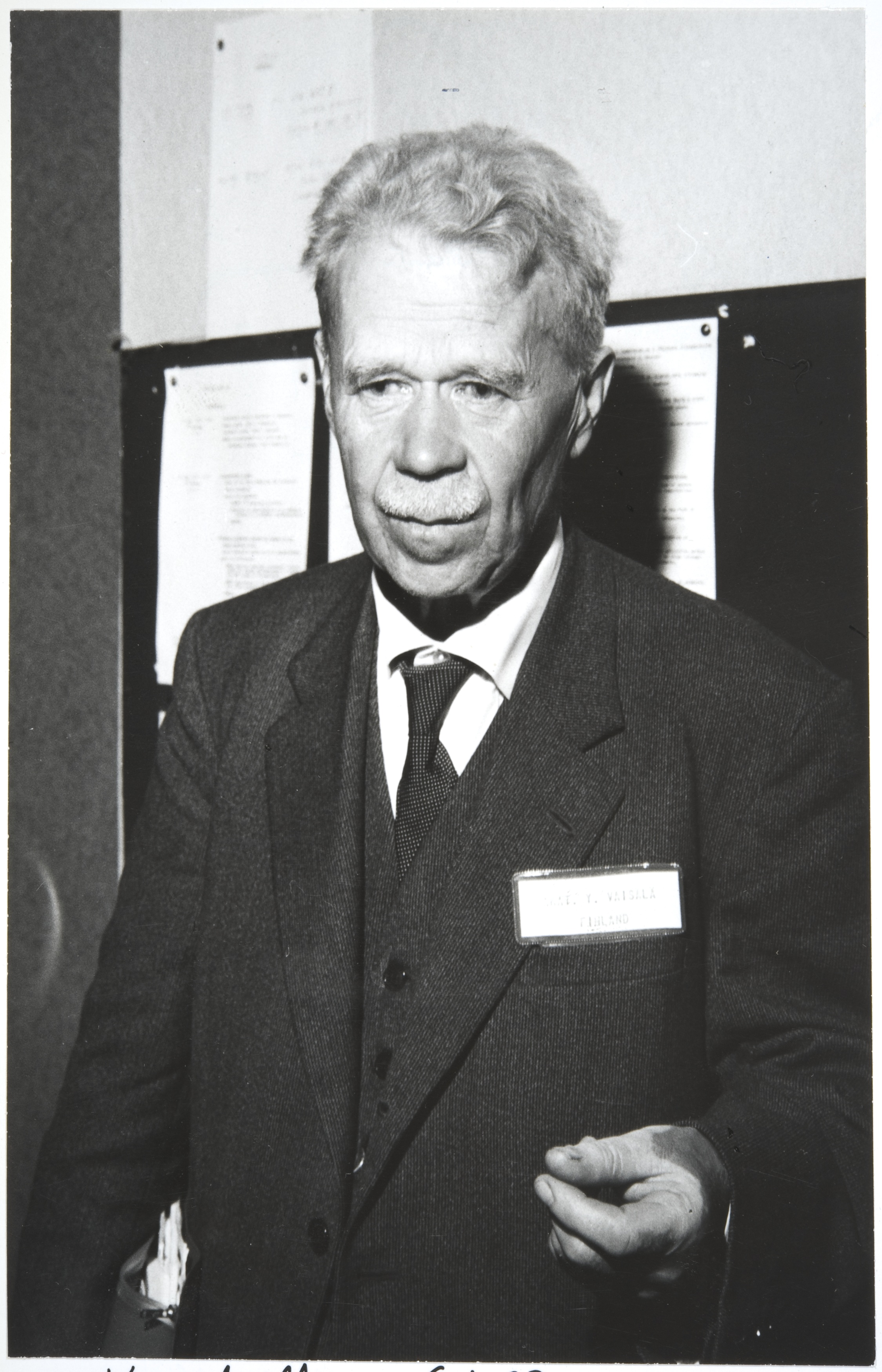
- Born: 6 September 1891 (Note: The birth date is a Gregorian calendar date. Although Grand Duchy of Finland was part of the Russian Empire at the time and Russia used the Julian calendar until 1918, the Gregorian calendar continued in official use in Finland because Finland had been part of Sweden when Sweden had converted to the Gregorian calendar in 1753.); Utra, Grand Duchy of Finland, Russian Empire
- Died: 21 July 1971 (aged 79); Rymättylä, Finland
- Scientific career
- Fields: astronomy, physics

Yrjö Väisälä (Finnish: [ˈyrjø ˈʋæi̯sælæ]; 6 September 1891 – 21 July 1971) was a Finnish astronomer and physicist.

His main contributions were in the field of optics. He was also active in geodetics, astronomy and optical metrology. He had an affectionate nickname of Wizard of Tuorla (Observatory/Optics laboratory), and a book with the same title in Finnish describes his works. His discoveries include 128 asteroids and 3 comets.

His brothers were mathematician Kalle Väisälä (1893–1968) and meteorologist Vilho Väisälä (1889–1969). His daughter Marja Väisälä (1916–2011) was an astronomer and discoverer of minor planets.

Väisälä was a fervent supporter of Esperanto, presiding over the Internacia Scienca Asocio Esperantista ("International Association of Esperanto Scientists") in 1968.

== Optician ==
He developed several methods for measuring the quality of optical elements, as well as a lot of practical methods of manufacturing said elements. This allowed the construction of some of the earliest high-quality Schmidt cameras, in particular a "field-flattened" version known as Schmidt-Väisälä camera. Contemporary to Bernhard Schmidt's design, but unpublished was also Prof. Yrjö Väisälä's identical design which he had mentioned in lecture notes in 1924 with a footnote: "problematic spherical focal surface".

Once he saw Schmidt's publication, he promptly went ahead and "solved" the field flattening problem by placing a doubly convex lens slightly in front of the film holder – back in the 1930s, astronomical films were glass plates (also see photographic plates). The resulting system is known as the Schmidt-Väisälä camera or sometimes as the Väisälä camera. (This solution is not perfect, as images of different colour end up at slightly different places.) Prof. Väisälä made a small test unit of 7 mirrors in a mosaic on a stiff background steel frame, however it proved to be impossible to stabilize as a "just adjust and forget" structure, and next time anybody tried it, it was with active controls on the Multiple Mirror Telescope.

== Geodesy ==
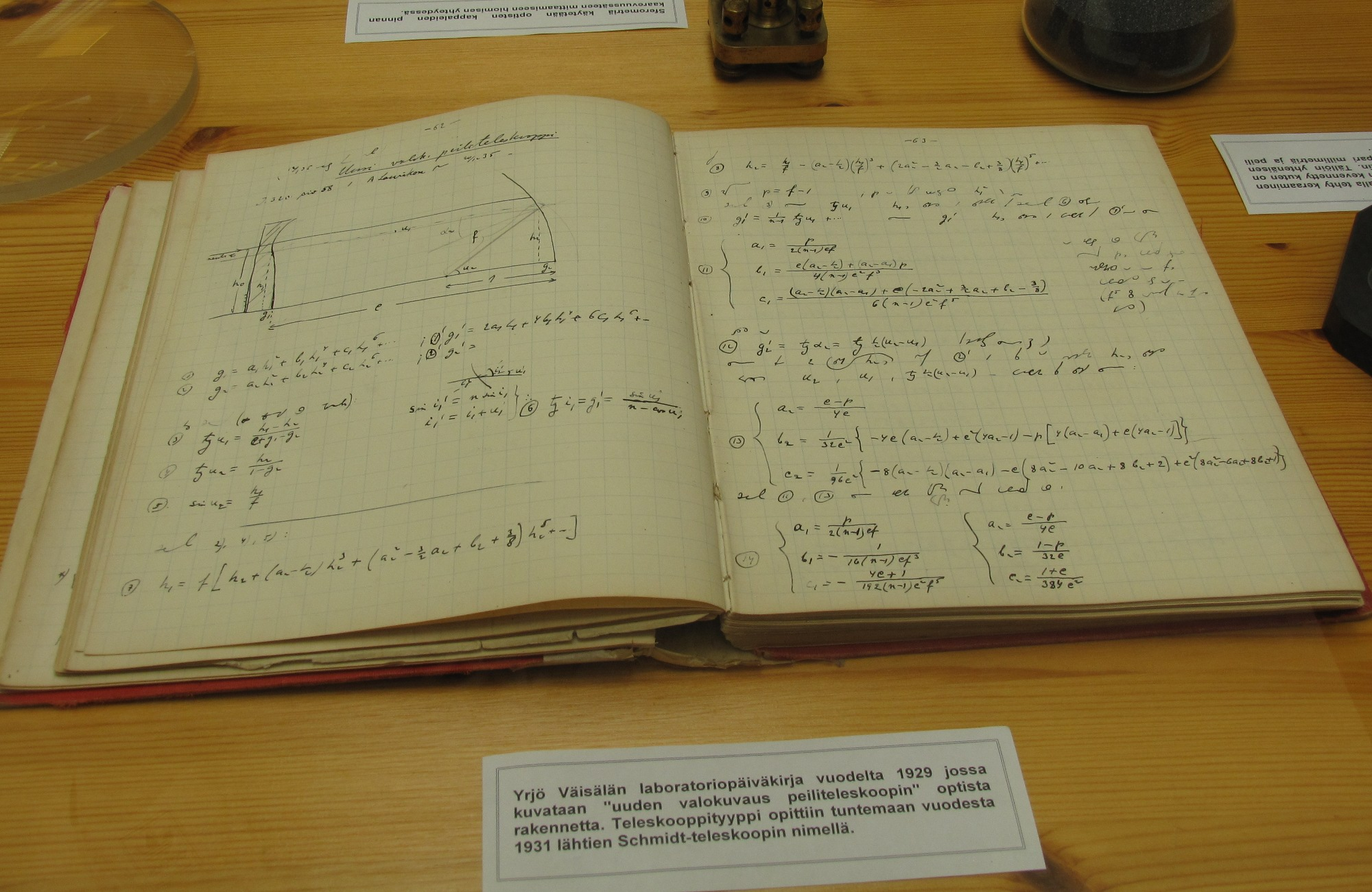
A laboratory diary of Yrjö Väisälä. The text is written in 1929. On the pages seen here Väisälä describes the principle of 'a new telescope for photography'. Väisälä never published this concept and a few years later the Estonian Bernhard Schmidt invented the same construction, which is now known as the Schmidt camera.

In the 1920s and 1930s Finland was doing its first precision triangulation chain measurements, and to create long-distance direction observations between vertices lacking a direct line of sight, Prof. Väisälä proposed use of flash-lights on 5 to 10 kilometres (16,000 to 33,000 ft) altitude balloons, or on some big fireworks rockets. The idea was to measure the exact position of the flash against background stars from two camera locations, and by precisely knowing one camera location, to derive an accurate location for the other camera. This required better wide-field cameras than were available, and was discarded.

Later, Prof. Väisälä developed a method to multiply an optical length reference using white light interferometry to precisely determine lengths of baselines used in triangulation chains. Several such baselines were created in Finland for the second high-precision triangulation campaign in the 1950s and 1960s.

Later GPS made these methods largely obsolete. The Nummela Standard Baseline established by Väisälä is still maintained by the Finnish Geodetic Institute in Nummela for the calibration of other distance measurement instruments.

Prof. Väisälä also developed excellent tools to measure the earth rotational axis position by building so called zenith telescopes, and in the 1960s Tuorla Observatory was in the top rank of North Pole position tracking measurements.

In the 1980s radioastronomy was able to replace Earth rotation tracking by referring things against the "non-moving background" of quasars.

For use in zenith telescopes, Prof. Väisälä made also one of the first experiments at creating rotating mirrors of liquid mercury. (Such a mirror needs extremely smooth rotational speeds, which were achieved in the late 1990s.)

== Astronomer ==
The big Schmidt-Väisälä telescope he built was used at the University of Turku for searching asteroids and comets. His research group discovered 7 comets and 807 asteroids.

For this rather massive photographic survey work, Prof. Väisälä developed also a protocol of taking two exposures on the same plate some 2–3 hours apart and offsetting those images slightly. Any dot-pairs that differed from the background were from moving objects, and deserved follow-up photos. This method halved the film consumption compared to the method of "blink comparing", where plates get single exposures, and are compared by rapidly showing the first and second exposures to a human operator. (Blink-comparing was used to find e.g. Pluto.)

Yrjö Väisälä is credited by the Minor Planet Center with the discovery of 128 asteroids (see below) during 1935–1944. He used to name them with the names of his personal friends that had birthdays. One of them was the professor Matti Herman Palomaa, after whom an asteroid 1548 Palomaa was named.

Besides minor planets, he has also discovered 3 comets. The parabolic comet C/1944 H1 observed in 1944 and 1945, as well as the two short period comets, 40P/Väisälä, a Jupiter-family comet, and C/1942 EA, a Halley-type and near-Earth comet. Together with Liisi Oterma he co-discovered the Jupiter-family comet 139P/Väisälä–Oterma, which was first classified as an asteroid and received the provisional designation "1939 TN".

== Honors and awards ==
The University of Turku Astronomy department is known as VISPA: Väisälä Institute for Space Physics and Astronomy in honour of its founder. The lunar crater Väisälä is named after him, and so are the minor planets 1573 Väisälä and 2804 Yrjö.

== List of discovered minor planets ==
1391 Carelia	16 February 1936	list
1398 Donnera	26 August 1936	list
1405 Sibelius	12 September 1936	list
1406 Komppa	13 September 1936	list
1407 Lindelöf	21 November 1936	list
1421 Esperanto	18 March 1936	list
1424 Sundmania	9 January 1937	list
1446 Sillanpää	26 January 1938	list
1447 Utra	26 January 1938	list
1448 Lindbladia	16 February 1938	list

1449 Virtanen	20 February 1938	list
1450 Raimonda	20 February 1938	list
1451 Granö	22 February 1938	list
1453 Fennia	8 March 1938	list
1454 Kalevala	16 February 1936	list
1460 Haltia	24 November 1937	list
1462 Zamenhof	6 February 1938	list
1463 Nordenmarkia	6 February 1938	list
1471 Tornio	16 September 1938	list
1472 Muonio	18 October 1938	list

1473 Ounas	22 October 1938	list
1477 Bonsdorffia	6 February 1938	list
1478 Vihuri	6 February 1938	list
1479 Inkeri	16 February 1938	list
1480 Aunus	18 February 1938	list
1483 Hakoila	24 February 1938	list
1488 Aura	15 December 1938	list
1492 Oppolzer	23 March 1938	list
1494 Savo	16 September 1938	list
1495 Helsinki	21 September 1938	list

1496 Turku	22 September 1938	list
1497 Tampere	22 September 1938	list
1498 Lahti	16 September 1938	list
1499 Pori	16 October 1938	list
1500 Jyväskylä	16 October 1938	list
1503 Kuopio	15 December 1938	list
1518 Rovaniemi	15 October 1938	list
1519 Kajaani	15 October 1938	list
1520 Imatra	22 October 1938	list
1521 Seinäjoki	22 October 1938	list

1523 Pieksämäki	18 January 1939	list
1524 Joensuu	18 September 1939	list
1525 Savonlinna	18 September 1939	list
1526 Mikkeli	7 October 1939	list
1527 Malmquista	18 October 1939	list
1529 Oterma	26 January 1938	list
1530 Rantaseppä	16 September 1938	list
1532 Inari	16 September 1938	list
1533 Saimaa	19 January 1939	list
1534 Näsi	20 January 1939	list

1535 Päijänne	9 September 1939	list
1536 Pielinen	18 September 1939	list
1541 Estonia	12 February 1939	list
1542 Schalén	26 August 1941	list
1548 Palomaa	26 March 1935	list
1549 Mikko	2 April 1937	list
1551 Argelander	24 February 1938	list
1552 Bessel	24 February 1938	list
1567 Alikoski	22 April 1941	list
1631 Kopff	11 October 1936	list

1646 Rosseland	19 January 1939	list
1656 Suomi	11 March 1942	list
1659 Punkaharju	28 December 1940	list
1677 Tycho Brahe	6 September 1940	list
1678 Hveen	28 December 1940	list
1696 Nurmela	18 March 1939	list
1699 Honkasalo	26 August 1941	list
1723 Klemola	18 March 1936	list
1740 Paavo Nurmi	18 October 1939	list
1757 Porvoo	17 March 1939	list

1883 Rimito	4 December 1942	list
1928 Summa	21 September 1938	list
1929 Kollaa	20 January 1939	list
1947 Iso-Heikkilä	4 March 1935	list
2020 Ukko	18 March 1936	list
2067 Aksnes	23 February 1936	list
2091 Sampo	26 April 1941	list
2096 Väinö	18 October 1939	list
2194 Arpola	3 April 1940	list
2204 Lyyli	3 March 1943	list

2243 Lönnrot	25 September 1941	list
2258 Viipuri	7 October 1939	list
2292 Seili	7 September 1942	list
2299 Hanko	25 September 1941	list
2333 Porthan	3 March 1943	list
2379 Heiskanen	21 September 1941	list
2397 Lappajärvi	22 February 1938	list
2454 Olaus Magnus	21 September 1941	list
2464 Nordenskiöld	19 January 1939	list
2479 Sodankylä	6 February 1942	list

2486 Metsähovi	22 March 1939	list
2502 Nummela	3 March 1943	list
2512 Tavastia	3 April 1940	list
2535 Hämeenlinna	17 February 1939	list
2638 Gadolin	19 September 1939	list
2639 Planman	9 April 1940	list
2678 Aavasaksa	24 February 1938	list
2679 Kittisvaara	7 October 1939	list
2690 Ristiina	24 February 1938	list
2715 Mielikki	22 October 1938	list

2716 Tuulikki	7 October 1939	list
2733 Hamina	22 February 1938	list
2737 Kotka	22 February 1938	list
2750 Loviisa	30 December 1940	list
2802 Weisell	19 January 1939	list
2820 Iisalmi	8 September 1942	list
2826 Ahti	18 October 1939	list
2885 Palva	7 October 1939	list
2898 Neuvo	20 February 1938	list
2962 Otto	28 December 1940	list

2972 Niilo	7 October 1939	list
3037 Alku	17 January 1944	list
3099 Hergenrother	3 April 1940	list
3166 Klondike	30 March 1940	list
3212 Agricola	19 February 1938	list
3223 Forsius	7 September 1942	list
3272 Tillandz	24 February 1938	list
3281 Maupertuis	24 February 1938	list
3522 Becker	21 September 1941	list
3606 Pohjola	19 September 1939	list

3897 Louhi	8 September 1942	list
4181 Kivi	24 February 1938	list
4266 Waltari	28 December 1940	list
4512 Sinuhe	20 January 1939	list
5073 Junttura	3 March 1943	list
5153 Gierasch	9 April 1940	list
6073 Tahtiseuraursa	18 October 1939	list
6572 Carson	22 September 1938	list

== Gallery ==
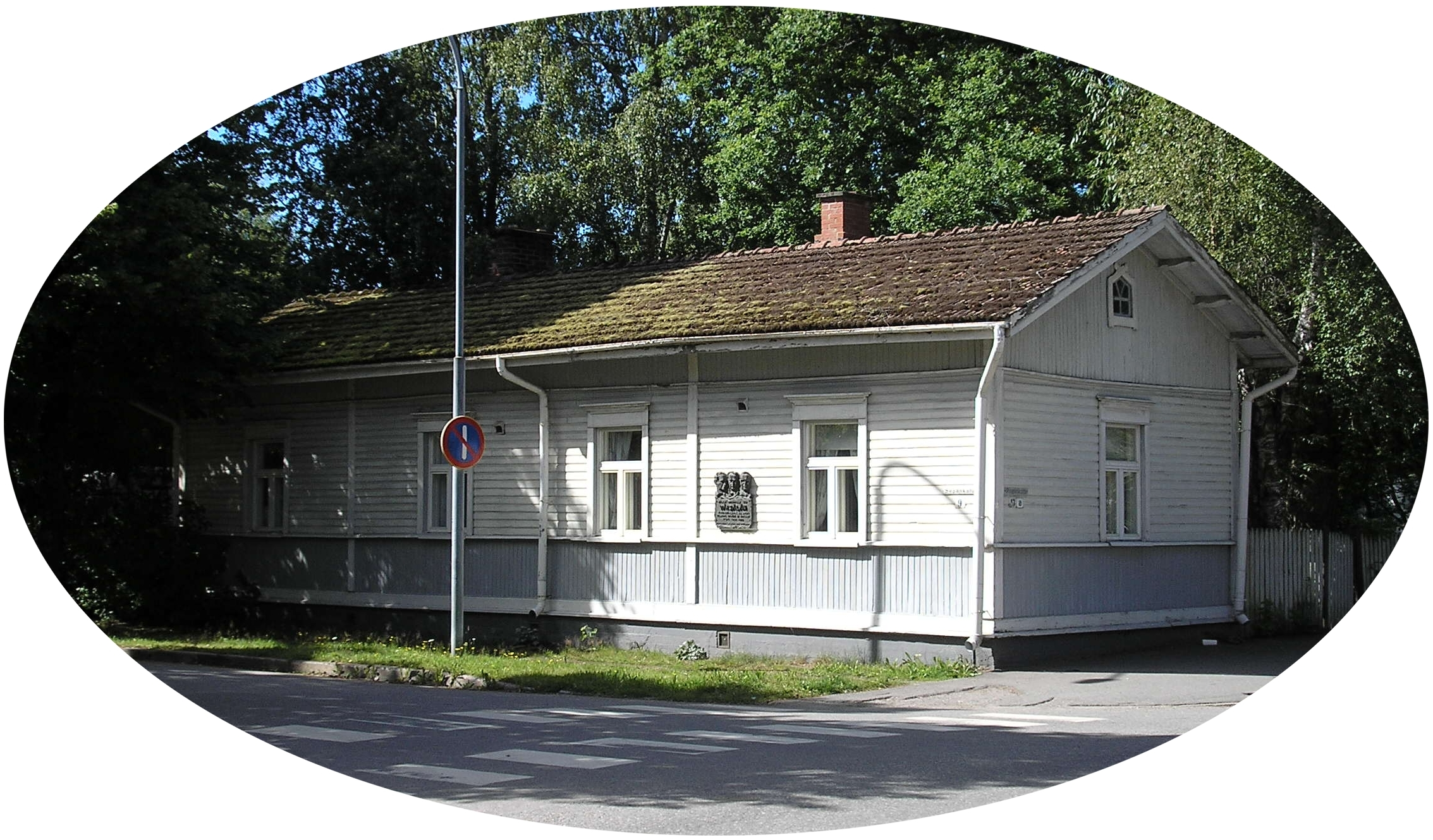
An early 20th century wooden house in Joensuu at the corner of Sepänkatu and Papinkatu streets. The building was Väisälä brothers' home in 1904–19.
