= 40P/Väisälä =

Periodic comet

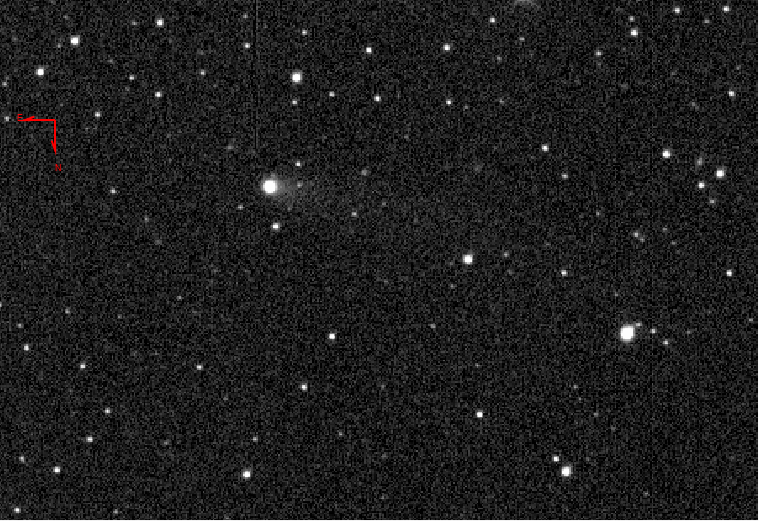
- Comet Väisälä 1 imaged from the Zwicky Transient Facility on January 20, 2026

Discovery
- Discovered by: Yrjö Väisälä
- Discovery site: University of Turku, Finland
- Discovery date: February 8, 1939

Designations
- MPC designation: P/1939 CB, P/1949 Y1
- Alternative designations: Väisälä 1; 1939 IV, 1949 V; 1960 IV, 1971 VII; 1982 V, 1993 VIII

Orbital characteristics
- Epoch: May 5, 2025 (JD 2460800.5)
- Observation arc: 86.16 years
- Earliest precovery date: January 18, 1939
- Number of observations: 1,243
- Aphelion: 8.079 AU
- Perihelion: 1.824 AU
- Semi-major axis: 4.951 AU
- Eccentricity: 0.63169
- Orbital period: 11.018 years
- Inclination: 11.639°
- Longitude of ascending node: 128.90°
- Argument of periapsis: 52.029°
- Mean anomaly: 342.92°
- Last perihelion: November 12, 2025
- Next perihelion: November 22, 2036
- T_{Jupiter}: 2.535
- Earth MOID: 0.823 AU
- Jupiter MOID: 0.077 AU

Physical characteristics
- Mean diameter: 4.2 km (2.6 mi)
- Comet total magnitude (M1): 11.6
- Comet nuclear magnitude (M2): 14.8

40P/Väisälä is a periodic comet that was discovered on February 8, 1939. Its orbit was determined on April 26, 1939. In 1994, the diameter of its nucleus was found to be 4.2 km (2.6 mi), similar in size to that of Comet Encke. It came to perihelion on November 12, 2025.

== Discovery ==
Comet Väisälä was discovered accidentally on photographs exposed for minor planets. Originally, it was given the asteroid designation 1939 CB. However, additional findings revealed that the object was of cometary nature. The visual magnitude of Väisälä at the time of its discovery was 15. The orbital characteristics of the new comet at the time of its discovery were "a period of about 10 years, a perihelion date of April 26, 1939, and a perihelion distance of 1.75 AU (262 million km)."

== Outburst ==
The comet was observed to brighten by 2.7 magnitudes between 19 January and 20 January 2026, from magnitude 17.1 to 14.4, when the comet was 1.95 AU from the Sun. The appearance of the comet also changed, featuring a compact source centered at the comet's nucleus instead of the coma and nucleus of the previous day. The ejecta on 21 January had expanded to 5 arcseconds.

== Orbit ==
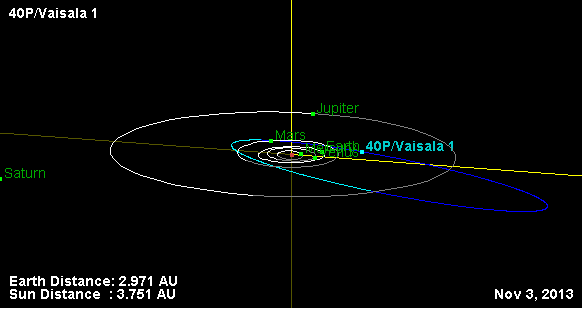
Orbit of 40P/Väisälä, which crosses the orbit of Jupiter and is frequently gravitationally perturbed

The orbit of Comet Väisälä resembles that of many centaurs, and is therefore unstable over thousands of years due to gravitational interactions with the gas giant Jupiter. One such close approach, 0.41 AU (61 million km) on December 31, 1961, increased its perihelion distance from 1.74 AU to 1.87 AU and increased its orbital period from 10.46 to 11.28 years. On September 21, 1973, an approach of Jupiter 1 AU away decreased perihelion distance from 1.87 AU to 1.80 AU decreased orbital period from 11.28 to 10.88 years. Väisälä will make one more close approach in the 21st century, but it will have a minimal effect. However, in the year 2127, the comet will make a close approach of only 0.096 AU from Jupiter, and reduce perihelion to 1.4 AU.

Numbered comets
Previous; 39P/Oterma	40P/Väisälä	Next; 41P/Tuttle–Giacobini–Kresák
