= Park Milutin Milanković =

Park in Belgrade, Serbia

- Парк Милутин Миланковић
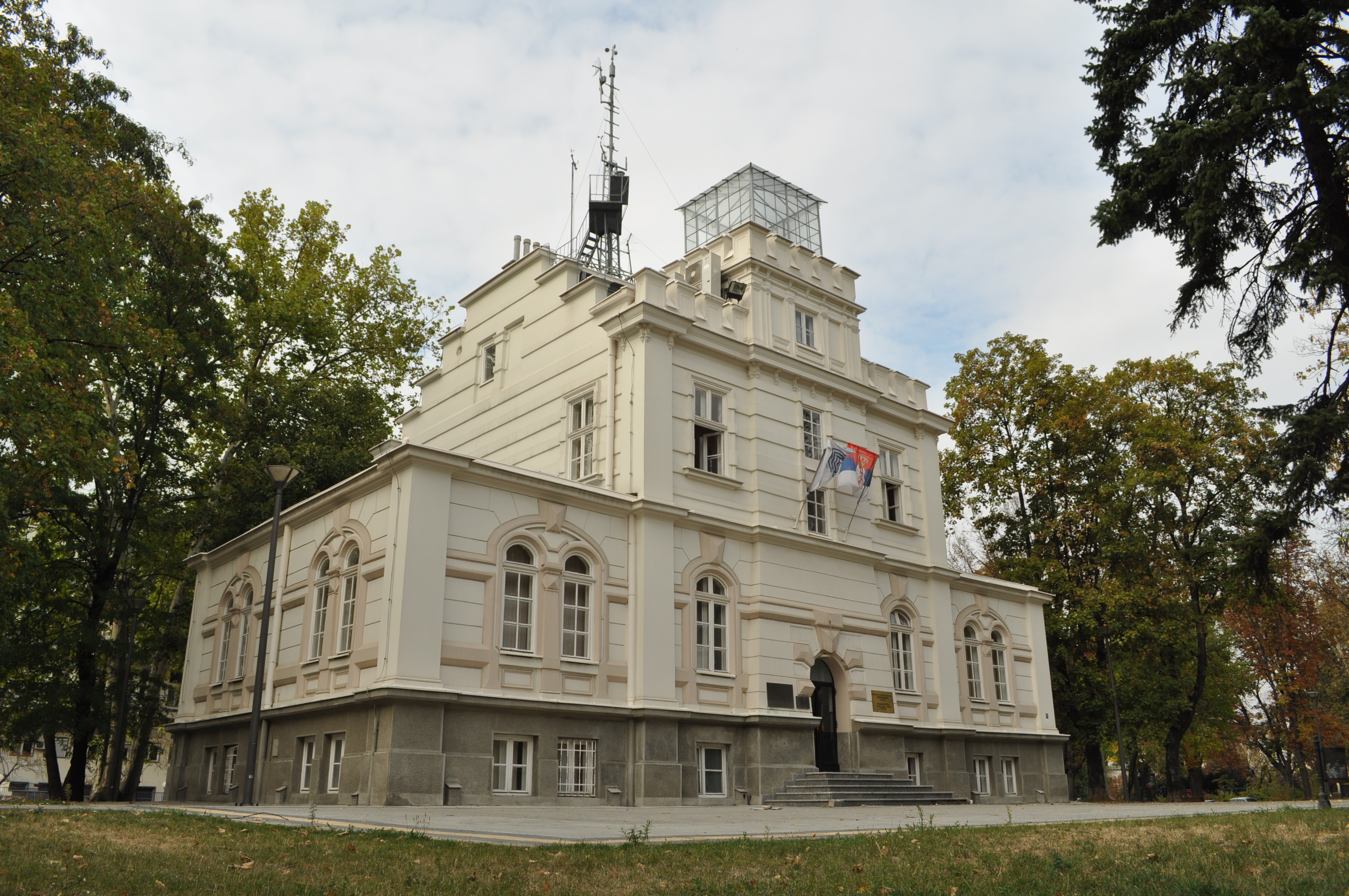
- Formerly astronomical, today meteorological observatory in the park

- Location within Belgrade
- Location: Savski Venac, Belgrade
- Coordinates: 44.798696°N 20.464790°E
- Area: 2.48 hectares (6.1 acres)
- Created: 1950s
- Open: Open all year

Park Milutin Milanković (Serbian: Парк Милутин Миланковић) is a park in Belgrade, a capital of Serbia. It is situated on top of the Vračar hill, in the municipality of Savski Venac and was the former location of the Belgrade Observatory from 1891 to 1929. Before it was named after scientist Milutin Milanković in 2010, it was known as Old Zvezdara (Stara Zvezdara).

== Location ==
The park is located in the northeast section of the municipality, pm the border with the Vračаr municipality. It is bounded by the streets of Tiršova to the north, Pasterova to the south, Bulevar oslobođenja to the east and the building of the University Children's Clinic Tiršova to the west. The park is situated right across the northernmost tip of the Karađorđev Park, across the Bulevar oslobođenja to the east.

== History ==
New building of the Belgrade Observatory, as previously a rented private house was used, was built and opened on 1 May 1891 on the location of modern park. The site atop of Vračar hill was specifically chosen due to its elevation. The building was specifically constructed for that purpose. It was constructed according to the design of architect Dimitrije T. Leko and equipped with the modern small instruments for astronomical and meteorological observations. Two small astronomical pavilions were also built. The Observatory was a workshop for practical training for the students of the Grand School and People's Observatory, but was opened for the citizens, too – for example, in 1910 Halley's Comet was observed. Apart from its importance for astronomy and meteorology, the newly built Observatory was a cradle of the seismic and geomagnetic researches in Serbia as the observatory was equipped with a seismograph. In 1924, by ruling of the Faculty Council the Observatory was divided into two separate institutions: Astronomical Observatory and Meteorological Observatory of Belgrade University. In 1929 funds were granted for the constructions of a new, modern, observatory, at 6 km (3.7 mi) distance southeast from the city's centre, at the 253 m (830 ft) high hill on Veliki Vračar, while the old building remained a meteorological observatory. As original Serbian word for an observatory was zvezdara, old building became known as the "Stara Zvezdara" (Old Zvezdara) while the new observatory was simply called "Zvezdara", giving its name to the Veliki Vračar hill, the surrounding forest, the neighborhood which developed later and the modern municipality of Zvezdara.

Around the building, a park was planted in the 1950s, retaining the name of Stara Zvezdara. In 2010 the name of the park was changed to the Park Milutin Milanković, after a worldwide renown scientist Milutin Milanković who worked for decades in the observatory. The building is today the seat of the Center for the Climate Changes "Milutin Milanković". Park was renovated and re-opened under the new name on 28 December 2010.

== Characteristics ==
The park is located at the entry point into the complex of the Clinical Center of Serbia, so many medical institutions are in the park's vicinity. The closest ones, apart from the University Children's Clinic, are: Oncology and Radiology Institute, Neurology Institute, Occupational Health Institute, Microbiology Institute, Pathology Institute and "Milan Jovanović Batut" Institute for Public Health, all located south and southwest from the park. To the west, the Church of Saint Sava and the National Library of Serbia are situated.

In 2011 city decided to erect the monument to Milanković in the park. On 26 June 2017 the monument, work of Zoran Ivanović, was dedicated. The pedestal is encased in marble and 1 m (3 ft 3 in) tall, while the statue itself is cast in bronze and 3 m (9.8 ft) tall.

== Gallery ==
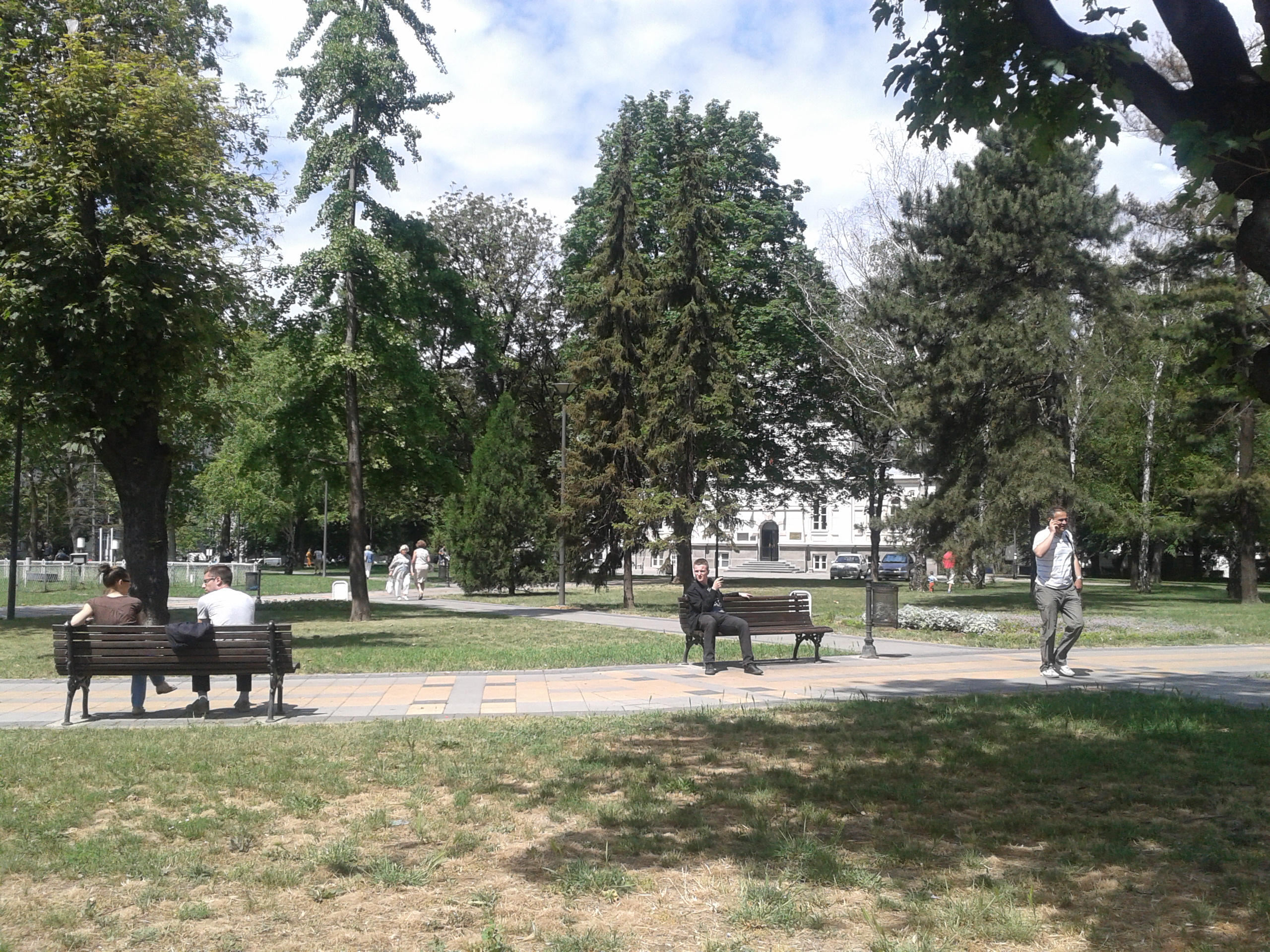
View at the old observatory

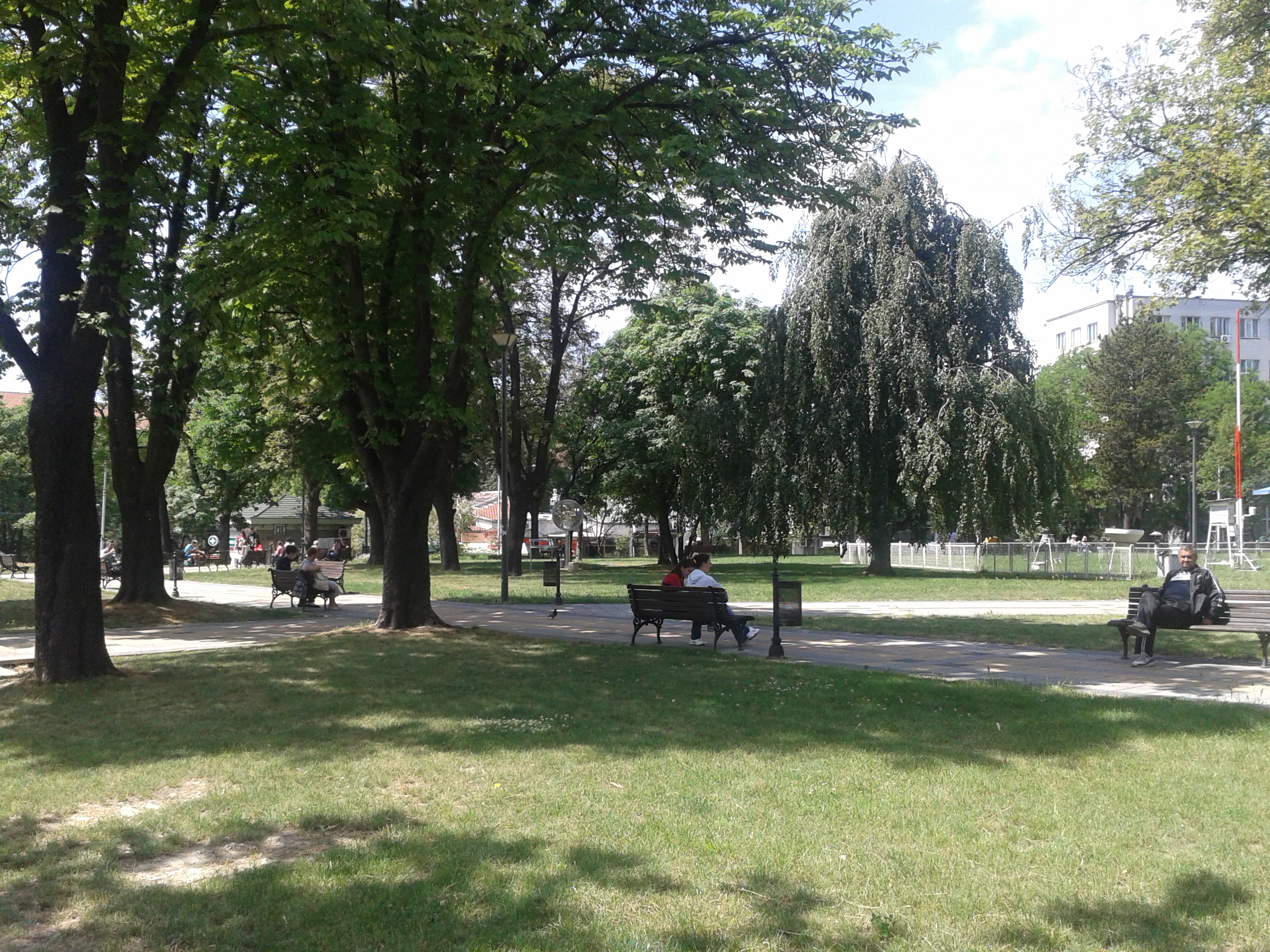
View at the Pasterova street

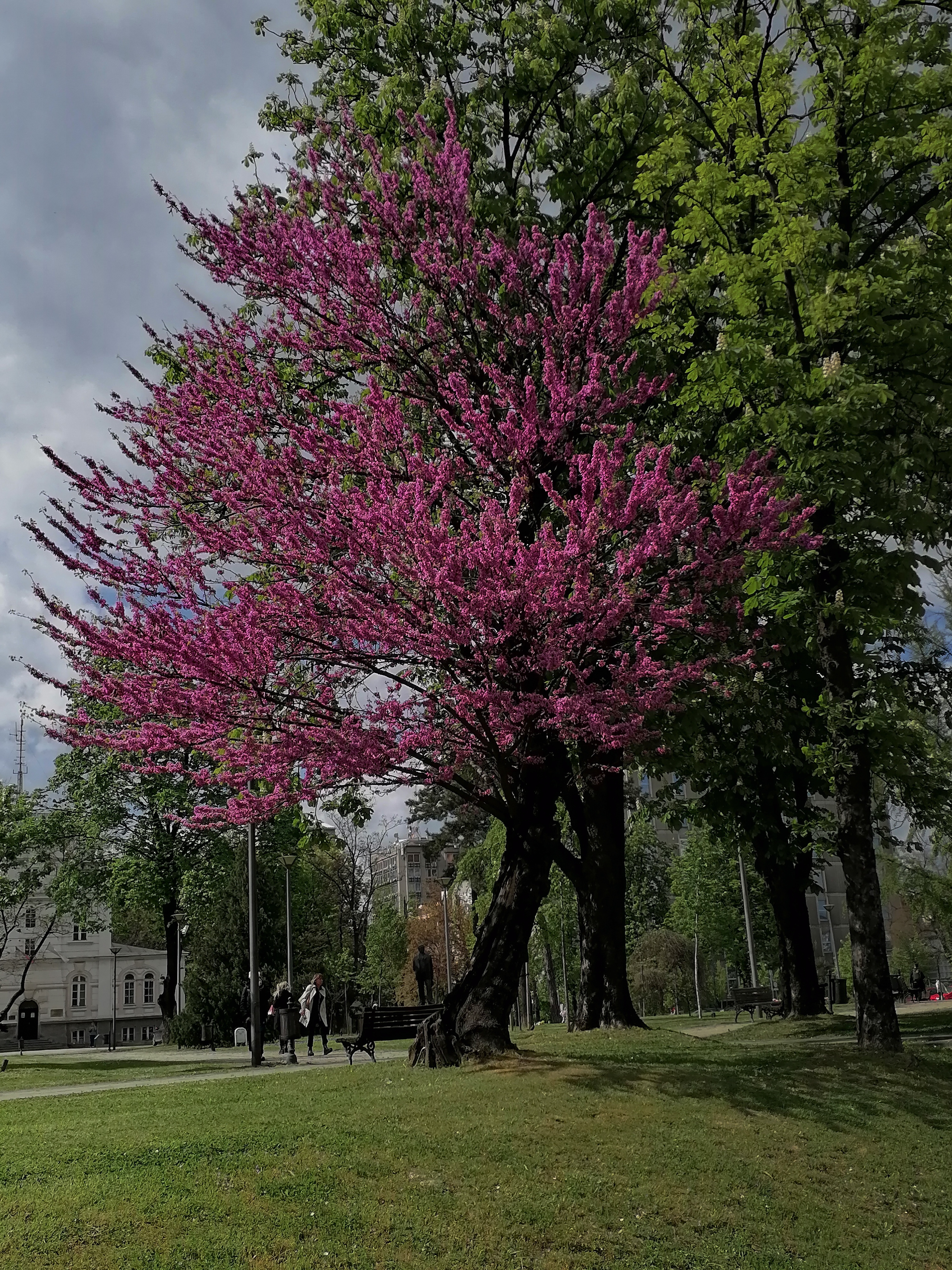
