= 1700 Zvezdara =

Asteroid

Discovery
- Discovered by: P. Djurkovic
- Discovery site: Belgrade Obs.
- Discovery date: 27 August 1940

Designations
- Named after: Zvezdara (location, "star-house")
- Alternative designations: 1940 QC · 1929 PM; 1951 SB · 1951 SO; 1955 XP · 1962 WJ
- Minor planet category: main-belt · (inner)

Orbital characteristics
- Epoch 4 September 2017 (JD 2458000.5)
- Uncertainty parameter 0
- Observation arc: 87.38 yr (31,916 days)
- Aphelion: 2.8944 AU
- Perihelion: 1.8266 AU
- Semi-major axis: 2.3605 AU
- Eccentricity: 0.2262
- Orbital period (sidereal): 3.63 yr (1,325 days)
- Mean anomaly: 60.598°
- Mean motion: 0° 16^{m} 18.48^{s} / day
- Inclination: 4.5153°
- Longitude of ascending node: 356.96°
- Argument of perihelion: 15.308°

Physical characteristics
- Dimensions: 20.176±0.209 km 20.86 km (derived); 21.71±0.41 km
- Synodic rotation period: 9.114±0.001 h 9.114±0.008 h (Note: Higgins (2011) web, rotation period 9.114±0.008 with an amplitude of 0.008 magnitude and quality: 3-; summary figures at Light Curve Database, (1700) Zvezdara)
- Geometric albedo: 0.039±0.002; 0.0425 (derived); 0.045±0.006
- Spectral type: Tholen = X · X B–V = 0.720; U–B = 0.322
- Absolute magnitude (H): 11.96±0.77 · 12.447±0.017 · 12.45 · 12.47(IRAS:10) · 12.47

1700 Zvezdara, provisional designation 1940 QC, is a dark asteroid from the inner regions of the asteroid belt, approximately 21 kilometers in diameter. It was discovered on 27 August 1940, by Serbian astronomer Petar Đurković at Belgrade Astronomical Observatory, Serbia, and named after the Zvezdara hill in Belgrade.

== Orbit and classification ==
The asteroid orbits the Sun in the inner main-belt at a distance of 1.8–2.9 AU once every 3 years and 8 months (1,325 days). Its orbit has an eccentricity of 0.23 and an inclination of 5° with respect to the ecliptic. It was first identified as 1929 PM at Johannesburg Observatory in 1929, extending the body's observation arc by 11 years prior to its official discovery observation at Belgrade.

== Physical characteristics ==
Zvezdara is characterized as an X-type asteroid in the Tholen classification.

=== Lightcurves ===
In September 2009, two rotational lightcurves of Zvezdara were obtained from observations, after being identified as a good candidate for photometry. They gave an identical rotation period of 9.114 hours with a brightness variation of 0.10 and 0.13 magnitude, respectively (U=3/3-).

=== Diameter and albedo ===
According to the survey carried out by the Japanese Akari satellite and NASA's Wide-field Infrared Survey Explorer with its subsequent NEOWISE mission, Zvezdara measures 20.17 and 21.71 kilometers in diameter and its surface has an albedo of 0.045 and 0.039, respectively. The Collaborative Asteroid Lightcurve Link derives an albedo of 0.043 and a diameter of 20.86 kilometers based on an absolute magnitude of 12.45, similar to one of the lightcurve studies that calculated a diameter of 20.89 kilometers.

== Naming ==
This minor planet is named after the hilly Zvezdara municipality of the city of Belgrade. It is the location of the Belgrade Observatory, founded in 1934. The Serbian word Zvezdara means "star-house" when literally translated. Zvezdara was one of two asteroids discovered by Petar Đurković, the other being 1605 Milankovitch. The official naming citation was published by the Minor Planet Center on 1 August 1980 (M.P.C. 5449).
