= 2348 Michkovitch =

Main-belt asteroid

Discovery
- Discovered by: M. B. Protić
- Discovery site: Belgrade Obs.
- Discovery date: 10 January 1939

Designations
- Named after: Vojislav Mišković (Serbian astronomer)
- Alternative designations: 1939 AA · 1958 GR; 1965 DA · 1975 XA_{5} 1978 QH_{1}
- Minor planet category: main-belt · Erigone

Orbital characteristics
- Epoch 4 September 2017 (JD 2458000.5)
- Uncertainty parameter 0
- Observation arc: 78.28 yr (28,590 days)
- Aphelion: 2.8089 AU
- Perihelion: 1.9862 AU
- Semi-major axis: 2.3975 AU
- Eccentricity: 0.1716
- Orbital period (sidereal): 3.71 yr (1,356 days)
- Mean anomaly: 60.159°
- Mean motion: 0° 15^{m} 55.8^{s} / day
- Inclination: 4.6718°
- Longitude of ascending node: 186.37°
- Argument of perihelion: 295.73°

Physical characteristics
- Dimensions: 4.595±0.098; 4.802±0.078 km 15.33 km (calculated)
- Synodic rotation period: 28 h (Note: Higgins (2011) web: rotation period 28 hours with a brightness amplitude of 0.12 mag. Summary figures for (2348) Michkovitch at Collaborative Asteroid Lightcurve Link (CALL) and Higgins, D.J. (2011))
- Geometric albedo: 0.057 (assumed); 0.8441±0.1248; 0.917±0.151
- Spectral type: C
- Absolute magnitude (H): 12.4 · 12.8 · 13.07±0.31

2348 Michkovitch, provisional designation 1939 AA, is a presumed carbonaceous Erigone asteroid from the inner regions of the asteroid belt, approximately 15 kilometers (9.3 miles) in diameter. It was discovered by Serbian astronomer Milorad Protić at Belgrade Observatory on 10 January 1939. The asteroid was named after Serbian astronomer Vojislav Mišković.

== Orbit and classification ==
Michkovitch is a member of the Erigone family, named after 163 Erigone, its largest member and namesake. It is a rather young cluster (170–280 My) of dark carbonaceous asteroids in the inner asteroid belt, which otherwise consists mostly of stony asteroids.

It orbits the Sun in the inner main-belt at a distance of 2.0–2.8 AU once every 3 years and 9 months (1,356 days). Its orbit has an eccentricity of 0.17 and an inclination of 5° with respect to the ecliptic. No precoveries were taken. The asteroid's observation arc starts 15 days after its official discovery with the first used observation taken at the Royal Observatory of Belgium.

== Naming ==
This minor planet was named by the discoverer after his professor Vojislav Mišković (1892–1976), first director of the new Belgrade Observatory and founder of the Astronomical Institute at SANU. The official naming citation was published by the Minor Planet Center on 7 March 1985 (M.P.C. 9477).

== Physical characteristics ==
=== Rotation period ===
A 2011-published rotational lightcurve of Michkovitch was obtained from photometric observations by Australian amateur astronomer David Higgins. Lightcurve analysis gave a longer-than average rotation period of 28 hours with a brightness variation of 0.12 in magnitude (U=2).

=== Diameter and albedo ===
According to the survey carried out by the NEOWISE mission of NASA's Wide-field Infrared Survey Explorer, Michkovitch measures 4.6 and 4.8 kilometers in diameter and its surface has an outstanding albedo of 0.84 and 0.92, respectively.

The Collaborative Asteroid Lightcurve Link strongly disagrees with the result obtained by the space-based observatory and assumes a standard albedo for carbonaceous asteroids of 0.057 and calculates a much larger diameter of 15.4 kilometers, as the lower the body's albedo (reflectivity), the larger its diameter at a constant absolute magnitude (brightness).
