= 1675 Simonida =

Main-belt asteroid

Discovery
- Discovered by: M. B. Protić
- Discovery site: Belgrade Obs.
- Discovery date: 20 March 1938

Designations
- Named after: Simonida (Queen)
- Alternative designations: 1938 FB · 1931 AZ; 1936 SG · 1941 BD; 1943 VJ · 1951 CL_{1} 1953 VD · 1958 FE; 1958 GX
- Minor planet category: main-belt · Flora

Orbital characteristics
- Epoch 4 September 2017 (JD 2458000.5)
- Uncertainty parameter 0
- Observation arc: 86.04 yr (31,427 days)
- Aphelion: 2.5114 AU
- Perihelion: 1.9550 AU
- Semi-major axis: 2.2332 AU
- Eccentricity: 0.1246
- Orbital period (sidereal): 3.34 yr (1,219 days)
- Mean anomaly: 18.859°
- Mean motion: 0° 17^{m} 43.08^{s} / day
- Inclination: 6.7964°
- Longitude of ascending node: 30.145°
- Argument of perihelion: 50.114°

Physical characteristics
- Dimensions: 11.08±0.5 km (IRAS:8); 12.16±0.52 km
- Synodic rotation period: 5.16±0.04 h 5.2885±0.0005 h 5.3±0.2 h
- Geometric albedo: 0.211±0.019; 0.2480±0.025 (IRAS:8); 0.2501 (SIMPS)
- Spectral type: S
- Absolute magnitude (H): 11.8 · 11.9 · 11.9±0.06 · 11.91

1675 Simonida, provisional designation 1938 FB, is a stony Florian asteroid from the inner regions of the asteroid belt, approximately 11 kilometers in diameter. Discovered by Milorad Protić in 1938, it was later named after the medieval Byzantine princess Simonida.

== Discovery ==
Simonida was discovered on 20 March 1938, by Serbian astronomer Milorad Protić at Belgrade Astronomical Observatory. On the same night, it was independently discovered by Belgian astronomer Fernand Rigaux at Uccle Observatory in Belgium.

== Classification and orbit ==
The S-type asteroid is a member of the Flora family, a large population of stony asteroids in the main-belt. It orbits the Sun at a distance of 2.0–2.5 AU once every 3 years and 4 months (1,219 days). Its orbit has an eccentricity of 0.12 and an inclination of 7° with respect to the ecliptic. Simonida's first observation was a precovery taken at Lowell Observatory in 1931, extending the body's observation arc by 7 years prior to its official discovery observation.

== Physical characteristics ==
=== Lightcurves ===
In March 1988, Polish astronomer Wiesław Z. Wiśniewski obtained a lightcurve of Simonida that gave a rotation period of 5.3 hours with a brightness variation of 0.26 magnitude (U=2). In January 2004, astronomer A. Kryszczynska at Poznań Observatory measured a period of 5.2885 hours with an amplitude of 0.50 magnitude (U=2+). In January 2008, photometric observations by astronomers Martine Castets, Bernard Trégon, Arnaud Leroy and Raoul Behrend gave a rotation period of 5.16 hours with a brightness variation of 0.21 (U=3-).

=== Diameter and albedo ===
According to the space-based Japanese Akari satellite, Simonida measures 12.16 kilometers in diameter, and its surface has an albedo of 0.211. The Collaborative Asteroid Lightcurve Link, however, agrees with the results obtained by 8 observations of the Infrared Astronomical Satellite IRAS, that gave a diameter of 11.08 kilometers and an albedo of 0.25 with an absolute magnitude of 11.9.

== Naming ==
This minor planet was named for Byzantine princess and queen consort Simonida, the wife of medieval Serbian king Stefan Milutin and symbol of beauty in former Yugoslavia. The official naming citation was published by the Minor Planet Center on 1 January 1973 (M.P.C. 3359).
