= 1555 Dejan =

Asteroid from the background population of the central regions of the asteroid belt

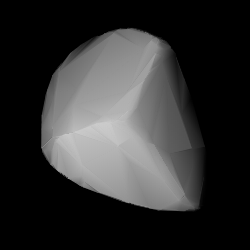
- Shape model of Dejan from its lightcurve

Discovery
- Discovered by: F. Rigaux
- Discovery site: Uccle Obs.
- Discovery date: 15 September 1941

Designations
- Named after: Dejan Đurković (son of astronomer Petar Đurković)
- Alternative designations: 1941 SA · 1932 PC; 1934 CD_{1} · 1954 NJ
- Minor planet category: main-belt · (middle)

Orbital characteristics
- Epoch 4 September 2017 (JD 2458000.5)
- Uncertainty parameter 0
- Observation arc: 84.64 yr (30,913 days)
- Aphelion: 3.4332 AU
- Perihelion: 1.9442 AU
- Semi-major axis: 2.6887 AU
- Eccentricity: 0.2769
- Orbital period (sidereal): 4.41 yr (1,610 days)
- Mean anomaly: 71.768°
- Mean motion: 0° 13^{m} 24.96^{s} / day
- Inclination: 6.0200°
- Longitude of ascending node: 318.08°
- Argument of perihelion: 47.825°

Physical characteristics
- Dimensions: 19.21 km (calculated); 21.77±7.25 km 23.199±0.314 km 24.04±0.48 km
- Synodic rotation period: 16.960±0.002 h
- Geometric albedo: 0.053±0.006; 0.0531±0.0056; 0.068±0.003; 0.08±0.09; 0.10 (assumed) (Note: For central-belt asteroids with 2.6 < a < 2.7, the LCDB assumes an "S/C" class with an albedo of 0.10, a compromise between the stony (p=0.20) and carbonaceous (p=0.057) asteroids, see LCDB readme)
- Spectral type: S/C
- Absolute magnitude (H): 11.65 · 11.70

1555 Dejan (provisional designation 1941 SA) is an asteroid from the background population of the central regions of the asteroid belt, approximately 22 kilometers in diameter. It was discovered on 15 September 1941, by Belgian astronomer Fernand Rigaux at the Royal Observatory of Belgium in Uccle. The asteroid was named after Dejan Đurković, son of Serbian astronomer Petar Đurković.

== Orbit and classification ==
Dejan is a non-family asteroid from the main belt's background population. It orbits the Sun in the central asteroid belt at a distance of 1.9–3.4 AU once every 4 years and 5 months (1,610 days). Its orbit has an eccentricity of 0.28 and an inclination of 6° with respect to the ecliptic. The body's observation arc begins with its first identification as 1932 PC at Johannesburg Observatory in August 1932, more than 9 years prior to its official discovery observation at Uccle.

== Naming ==
This minor planet was named after Dejan Đurković, son of Petar Đurković (1908–1981), a Serbian astronomer and discoverer of minor planets at the Belgrade Observatory. The official naming citation was mentioned in The Names of the Minor Planets by Paul Herget in 1955 (H 137).

== Physical characteristics ==
=== Rotation period ===
In September 2016, a rotational lightcurve of Dejan was obtained from photometric observations by the Spanish amateur astronomer group OBAS. Lightcurve analysis gave a rotation period of 16.960 hours with a brightness variation of 0.41 magnitude (U=2+).

=== Diameter and albedo ===
According to the survey carried out by the NEOWISE mission of NASA's Wide-field Infrared Survey Explorer, Dejan measures 21.77 and 23.199 kilometers in diameter and its surface has an albedo of 0.053 and 0.08, respectively, while the Japanese Akari satellite found a diameter of 24.04 kilometers with an albedo of 0.068.

The Collaborative Asteroid Lightcurve Link assumes an albedo of 0.10 – a compromise value between the darker C-type and brighter S-type asteroids – and calculates a diameter of 19.21 kilometers based on an absolute magnitude of 11.7.
