= 1564 Srbija =

Dark asteroid

Discovery
- Discovered by: M. B. Protitch
- Discovery site: Belgrade Obs.
- Discovery date: 15 October 1936

Designations
- Pronunciation: sř̩bija
- Named after: Serbia (country)
- Alternative designations: 1936 TB · 1933 FR_{1} 1975 TF
- Minor planet category: main-belt · (outer)

Orbital characteristics
- Epoch 4 September 2017 (JD 2458000.5)
- Uncertainty parameter 0
- Observation arc: 84.10 yr (30,718 days)
- Aphelion: 3.8016 AU
- Perihelion: 2.5547 AU
- Semi-major axis: 3.1782 AU
- Eccentricity: 0.1962
- Orbital period (sidereal): 5.67 yr (2,070 days)
- Mean anomaly: 141.69°
- Mean motion: 0° 10^{m} 26.4^{s} / day
- Inclination: 11.011°
- Longitude of ascending node: 177.60°
- Argument of perihelion: 230.17°

Physical characteristics
- Dimensions: 29.48±8.22 km 30.23±8.42 km 37.12 km (calculated); 39.32±1.43 km 41.681±1.170 km 43.232±0.423 km
- Synodic rotation period: 9.135±0.001 h 29.64±0.02 h
- Geometric albedo: 0.0420±0.0092; 0.045±0.005; 0.051±0.004; 0.057 (assumed); 0.09±0.06; 0.10±0.08
- Spectral type: Tholen = X · C B–V = 0.698; U–B = 0.331
- Absolute magnitude (H): 10.77±0.30 · 10.82 · 10.88

1564 Srbija (IPA: [sř̩bija]; provisional designation 1936 TB) is a dark asteroid from the outer region of the asteroid belt, approximately 36 kilometers in diameter. It was discovered on 15 October 1936, by Serbian astronomer Milorad Protić at the Belgrade Astronomical Observatory in Serbia. It is named for the country of Serbia.

== Classification and orbit ==
The C-type asteroid is also classified as an X-type in the Tholen taxonomy. It orbits the Sun in the outer main-belt at a distance of 2.5–3.8 AU once every 5 years and 8 months (2,070 days). Its orbit has an eccentricity of 0.20 and an inclination of 11° with respect to the ecliptic. Srbija's observation arc begins 3 years prior to its official discovery observation with its first identification as 1933 FR_{1} at Heidelberg in 1933.

== Physical characteristics ==
Astronomers Maryanne Angliongto and Milan Mijic at Cal State LA, United States, obtained a rotational lightcurve of Srbija in May 2006. It gave a rotation period of 29.64 hours with a brightness variation of 0.37 magnitude (U=2). In November 2009, photometric observations by James W. Brinsfield at Via Capote Observatory (G69), California, gave a shorter period of 9.135 hours with an amplitude of 0.17 (U=3).

According to the space-based surveys carried out by the Japanese Akari satellite and NASA's Wide-field Infrared Survey Explorer with its subsequent NEOWISE mission, Srbija measures between 29.48 and 43.23 kilometers in diameter, and its surface has an albedo between 0.042 and 0.10. The Collaborative Asteroid Lightcurve Link assumes a standard albedo for carbonaceous asteroids of 0.057 and calculates a diameter of 37.12 kilometers with an absolute magnitude of 10.88.

== Naming ==
This minor planet was named in honour of the now sovereign state of Serbia in its transliterated native pronunciation (Serbian: Србија / Srbija). Srbija's discovery in 1936 was the first minor planet discovery made at Belgrade Observatory. The official naming citation was published by the Minor Planet Center in December 1952 (M.P.C. 844).
