= 2244 Tesla =

Asteroid

Discovery
- Discovered by: M. B. Protić
- Discovery site: Belgrade Obs.
- Discovery date: 22 October 1952

Designations
- Named after: Nikola Tesla (Serbian inventor)
- Alternative designations: 1952 UW_{1} · 1938 UE_{1} 1938 WE · 1949 AA; 1966 UB · 1976 YR_{3} 1980 SV · 1980 TJ_{15}
- Minor planet category: main-belt · (middle)

Orbital characteristics
- Epoch 4 September 2017 (JD 2458000.5)
- Uncertainty parameter 0
- Observation arc: 64.62 yr (23,602 days)
- Aphelion: 3.3186 AU
- Perihelion: 2.3020 AU
- Semi-major axis: 2.8103 AU
- Eccentricity: 0.1809
- Orbital period (sidereal): 4.71 yr (1,721 days)
- Mean anomaly: 260.21°
- Mean motion: 0° 12^{m} 33.12^{s} / day
- Inclination: 7.8234°
- Longitude of ascending node: 106.49°
- Argument of perihelion: 297.81°

Physical characteristics
- Dimensions: 24.377±0.030 km 29 km
- Geometric albedo: 0.050±0.003
- Spectral type: SMASS = C
- Absolute magnitude (H): 11.9

2244 Tesla, provisional designation 1952 UW_{1}, is a carbonaceous asteroid from the central region of the asteroid belt, approximately 25 kilometers in diameter. It was discovered on 22 October 1952, by Serbian astronomer Milorad Protić at the Belgrade Observatory, then Federal People's Republic of Yugoslavia, now Serbia. It is named after the inventor Nikola Tesla.

== Orbit ==
Tesla orbits the Sun in the central main-belt at a distance of 2.3–3.3 AU once every 4 years and 9 months (1,721 days). Its orbit has an eccentricity of 0.18 and an inclination of 8° with respect to the ecliptic. It was first identified as 1938 UE_{1} at Turku Observatory in 1938, extending the body's observation arc by 14 years prior to its official discovery at Belgrade.

== Physical characteristics ==
In the SMASS taxonomy, Tesla is a dark C-type asteroid. According to the survey carried out by NASA's Wide-field Infrared Survey Explorer with its subsequent NEOWISE mission, Tesla measures 24.37 kilometers in diameter and its surface has a low albedo of 0.050, in correspondence with its carbonaceous composition. A larger diameter estimate of 29 kilometers was obtained in 2008, from an asteroid occultation.

=== Lightcurves ===
As of 2017, Tesla's rotation period and shape remains unknown.

== Naming ==
This minor planet was named in memory of Serbian-American electrical engineer and inventor Nikola Tesla (1856–1943). He is best known for his contributions to the design of the modern alternating current (AC) electricity supply system. The lunar crater Tesla is also named in his honor. The approved naming citation was published by the Minor Planet Center on 7 March 1985 (M.P.C. 9477).
