= 1554 Yugoslavia =

Stony Eunomian asteroid from the middle region of the asteroid belt

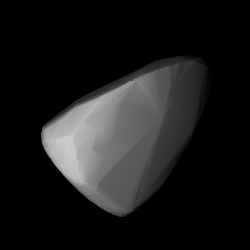
- Shape model of Yugoslavia from its lightcurve

Discovery
- Discovered by: M. B. Protitch
- Discovery site: Belgrade Observatory
- Discovery date: 6 September 1940

Designations
- Named after: Yugoslavia (country, 20th century)
- Alternative designations: 1940 RE · 1932 YA; 1935 JN · 1936 UH; 1948 MH
- Minor planet category: main-belt · Eunomia

Orbital characteristics
- Epoch 4 September 2017 (JD 2458000.5)
- Uncertainty parameter 0
- Observation arc: 83.98 yr (30,672 days)
- Aphelion: 3.1486 AU
- Perihelion: 2.0889 AU
- Semi-major axis: 2.6188 AU
- Eccentricity: 0.2023
- Orbital period (sidereal): 4.24 yr (1,548 days)
- Mean anomaly: 62.174°
- Mean motion: 0° 13^{m} 57.36^{s} / day
- Inclination: 12.151°
- Longitude of ascending node: 217.12°
- Argument of perihelion: 131.60°

Physical characteristics
- Dimensions: 14.73±1.13 km 15.94 km (calculated); 16.185±0.107 km 17.198±0.160 km 21.39±1.31 km
- Synodic rotation period: 3.8876±0.0001 h 3.8879±0.0003 h 3.89±0.01 h
- Geometric albedo: 0.070±0.009; 0.1043±0.0145; 0.117±0.026; 0.21 (assumed); 0.269±0.048
- Spectral type: S
- Absolute magnitude (H): 11.20 · 11.3 · 11.9

1554 Yugoslavia (provisional designation 1940 RE) is a stony Eunomian asteroid from the middle region of the asteroid belt, approximately 16 kilometres (9.9 mi) in diameter. It was discovered by Serbian astronomer Milorad Protić at Belgrade Astronomical Observatory, Serbia, on 6 September 1940. It was named for the former country of Yugoslavia.

== Orbit and classification ==
The asteroid is a member of the Eunomia family, a large group of mostly stony S-type asteroids and the most prominent family in the intermediate main-belt. It orbits the Sun in the central main-belt at a distance of 2.1–3.1 AU once every 4 years and 3 months (1,548 days). Its orbit has an eccentricity of 0.20 and an inclination of 12° with respect to the ecliptic. Yugoslavia was first identified as 1932 YA at Uccle Observatory in 1932. Its observation arc begins 4 year prior to its official discovery observation, with a precovery taken at Nice Observatory in 1936.

== Physical characteristics ==
From 2007 to 2012, several photometric lightcurve observations of Yugoslavia established a well-defined rotation period of 3.89 hours with a brightness variation between 0.64 and 0.74 magnitude (U=3/3/3).

According to the surveys carried out by the Japanese Akari satellite and NASA's Wide-field Infrared Survey Explorer with its subsequent NEOWISE mission, Yugoslavia measures between 14.73 and 21.39 kilometers in diameter, and its surface has an albedo between 0.070 and 0.269. The Collaborative Asteroid Lightcurve Link assumes an albedo of 0.21 – derived from 15 Eunomia, the family's largest member and namesake – and calculates a diameter of 15.94 kilometers with an absolute magnitude of 11.3.

== Naming ==
This minor planet was named after the former country of Yugoslavia. The official naming citation was published by the Minor Planet Center on 30 January 1964 (M.P.C. 2277).
