= Petar Đurković =

Serbian astronomer

Minor planets discovered: 2
1605 Milankovitch	13 April 1936	MPC
1700 Zvezdara	26 August 1940	MPC

Petar Đurković (Петар Ђурковић, 1908–1981) was a Serbian astronomer known for discovering two asteroids in 1936 and 1940, respectively. One is named for the Serbian scientist Milutin Milanković, the other for Zvezdara, the hill in Belgrade where the Belgrade Astronomical Observatory is located.

Asteroid 1555 Dejan, discovered by Fernand Rigaux, was named after Đurković's son (H 137).

Đurković was the director of Belgrade Observatory 1965-1970. He was also president of the Astronomical Society Ruđer Bošković, the oldest astronomical society in the Balkans.
