= 1517 Beograd =

Main-belt asteroid

Discovery
- Discovered by: M. B. Protić
- Discovery site: Belgrade Obs.
- Discovery date: 20 March 1938

Designations
- Named after: Belgrade (capital city)
- Alternative designations: 1938 FD · 1931 VF; 1934 JF · 1935 ST; 1942 CD · 1952 JG; 1952 KM_{1} · 1971 VT; 1978 EW_{6}
- Minor planet category: main-belt · (middle); Padua

Orbital characteristics
- Epoch 4 September 2017 (JD 2458000.5)
- Uncertainty parameter 0
- Observation arc: 85.34 yr (31,171 days)
- Aphelion: 2.8392 AU
- Perihelion: 2.5935 AU
- Semi-major axis: 2.7164 AU
- Eccentricity: 0.0452
- Orbital period (sidereal): 4.48 yr (1,635 days)
- Mean anomaly: 159.08°
- Mean motion: 0° 13^{m} 12.72^{s} / day
- Inclination: 5.2774°
- Longitude of ascending node: 63.889°
- Argument of perihelion: 231.89°

Physical characteristics
- Dimensions: 30.97±9.33 km 36.16±1.9 km (IRAS:20); 37.90±0.48 km 39.524±0.219 km 42.003±0.213 km
- Synodic rotation period: 6.943±0.004 h 6.9490±0.0006 h
- Geometric albedo: 0.0364±0.0021; 0.045±0.001; 0.0491±0.005 (IRAS:20); 0.050±0.006; 0.07±0.03
- Spectral type: SMASS = X · P · X
- Absolute magnitude (H): 11.1 · 11.23±0.66

1517 Beograd (provisional designation 1938 FD) is a dark Paduan asteroid from the central region of the asteroid belt, approximately 36 kilometers in diameter. It was discovered on 20 March 1938, by Serbian astronomer Milorad Protić at Belgrade Astronomical Observatory in Serbia. It is named after the city Belgrade.

== Orbit and classification ==
Beograd is member of the mid-sized Padua family (507), an asteroid family named after 363 Padua and at least 25 million years old. It consists of mostly X-type asteroids, that were previously associated to 110 Lydia (the Padua family is therefore also known as Lydia family). Together with the Agnia family, the Padua family is the only other family to have most of its members in a nonlinear secular resonance configuration with more than 75% of its members in a z1 librating state.

This asteroid orbits the Sun in the central main-belt at a distance of 2.6–2.8 AU once every 4 years and 6 months (1,635 days). Its orbit has an eccentricity of 0.05 and an inclination of 5° with respect to the ecliptic. In 1931, Beograd was first identified as 1931 VF at Uccle Observatory, extending the body's observation arc by 7 years prior to its official discovery observation at Belgrade.

== Physical characteristics ==
=== Lightcurves ===
French amateur astronomer Laurent Bernasconi obtained a lightcurve of Beograd from photometric observations taken in March 2005. Light-curve analysis gave a rotation period of 6.943 hours with a brightness variation of 0.18 magnitude (U=2). In April 2014, a lightcurve obtained by Vladimir Benishek at the discovering Belgrade Observatory gave a concurring period of 6.9490 hours with an amplitude of 0.23 magnitude (U=2).

=== Diameter and albedo ===
According to the surveys carried out by the Infrared Astronomical Satellite IRAS, the Japanese Akari satellite, and NASA's Wide-field Infrared Survey Explorer with its subsequent NEOWISE mission, Beograd measures between 30.97 and 42.00 kilometers in diameter, and its surface has an albedo between 0.036 and 0.07.

The Collaborative Asteroid Lightcurve Link adopts the results from IRAS, that is, an albedo of 0.0491 and a diameter of 36.16 kilometers using an absolute magnitude of 11.1.

=== Spectral type ===
Beograd is characterized as an X-type asteroid in the SMASS taxonomy, while NEOWISE classifies it as a reddish P-type asteroid due to its low albedo.

== Naming ==
This minor planet was named by the discoverer in honor of his native city and the capital of his country, Belgrade. The official naming citation was published by the Minor Planet Center on 30 January 1964 (M.P.C. 2277).
