= 1724 Vladimir =

Asteroid

Discovery
- Discovered by: E. Delporte
- Discovery site: Uccle Obs.
- Discovery date: 28 February 1932

Designations
- Named after: Vladimir (grandson of astronomer); Milorad Protić
- Alternative designations: 1932 DC · 1932 ED_{1} 1934 TB · 1952 UV_{1} 1961 VK · 1965 SE
- Minor planet category: main-belt · (middle)

Orbital characteristics
- Epoch 4 September 2017 (JD 2458000.5)
- Uncertainty parameter 0
- Observation arc: 85.17 yr (31,110 days)
- Aphelion: 2.8670 AU
- Perihelion: 2.5580 AU
- Semi-major axis: 2.7125 AU
- Eccentricity: 0.0570
- Orbital period (sidereal): 4.47 yr (1,632 days)
- Mean anomaly: 119.75°
- Mean motion: 0° 13^{m} 14.16^{s} / day
- Inclination: 12.232°
- Longitude of ascending node: 164.03°
- Argument of perihelion: 298.51°

Physical characteristics
- Dimensions: 28.40±12.05 km 28.45±9.13 km 32.85±0.42 km 34.79 km (IRAS:15); 35.84±0.48 km 36.3±3.6 km 38.476±0.236; 40±4 km 42.505±0.219 km
- Synodic rotation period: 12.557±0.0123 h 12.57±0.01 h (Note: Benishek (2011) web: rotation period 12.57±0.01 hours with a brightness amplitude of 0.14. Summary figures at Asteroid Lightcurve Database for (1724) Vladimir); 12.574±0.0043 h 12.582±0.002 h
- Geometric albedo: 0.0295±0.0129; 0.03±0.01; 0.037±0.005; 0.04±0.01; 0.042±0.006; 0.0441 (IRAS:15); 0.05±0.16; 0.051±0.002; 0.06±0.04
- Spectral type: FBCU:: (Tholen); B (SMASS) · X · B B–V = 0.693; U–B = 0.259
- Absolute magnitude (H): 11.250±0.003 (R) · 11.3 · 11.41 · 11.48±0.26

1724 Vladimir, provisional designation 1932 DC, is a rare-type asteroid from the central region of the asteroid belt, approximately 35 kilometers in diameter. It was discovered on 28 February 1932, by Belgian astronomer Eugène Delporte at the Royal Observatory of Belgium in Uccle, Belgium. The asteroid was later named by astronomer Milorad Protić after his grandson, Vladimir.

== Orbit and classification ==
Vladimir orbits the Sun in the central main-belt at a distance of 2.6–2.9 AU once every 4 years and 6 months (1,632 days). Its orbit has an eccentricity of 0.06 and an inclination of 12° with respect to the ecliptic. The body's observation arc begins with its official discovery observation at Uccle in 1928.

== Physical characteristics ==
The asteroid has a rare B- and FBCU spectral type in the SMASS and Tholen taxonomy, respectively.

=== Lightcurves ===
Two rotational lightcurve of Vladimir were obtained by Serbian astronomer Vladimir Benishek at the Belgrade Observatory in April 2008, and August 2015. Analysis of the bimodal lightcurve gave a rotation period of 12.57 and 12.582 hours with a relatively low brightness variation of 0.14 and 0.24 magnitude, respectively (U=2/2+).

In December 2010, and January 2012, photometric observations in the R-band at the Palomar Transient Factory in California gave a period of 12.574 and 12.557 hours with an amplitude of 0.23 and 0.22, respectively (U=2/2).

=== Diameter and albedo ===
According to the surveys carried out by the Japanese Akari satellite and NASA's Wide-field Infrared Survey Explorer with its subsequent NEOWISE mission, Vladimir measures between 28.40 and 42.505 kilometers in diameter, and its surface has a low albedo between 0.0295 and 0.037.

The Collaborative Asteroid Lightcurve Link adopts the results obtained by the Infrared Astronomical Satellite IRAS, that is, an albedo of 0.0441 and a diameter of 34.79 kilometers with an absolute magnitude of 11.30.

== Naming ==
This minor planet was named by Serbian astronomer Milorad Protić, who rediscovered the body in 1952, and made its permanent numbering possible (also see Lost minor planet). Protić named it after his grandson, Vladimir. The official naming citation was published by the Minor Planet Center on 1 April 1980 (M.P.C. 5281).
