= 1550 Tito =

Asteroid

Discovery
- Discovered by: M. B. Protitch
- Discovery site: Belgrade Obs.
- Discovery date: 29 November 1937

Designations
- Named after: Josip Broz Tito (statesman)
- Alternative designations: 1937 WD · 1941 XA; 1941 YE · 1945 WB; 1949 UR · 1983 CG_{3}
- Minor planet category: main-belt · (middle)

Orbital characteristics
- Epoch 4 September 2017 (JD 2458000.5)
- Uncertainty parameter 0
- Observation arc: 79.34 yr (28,979 days)
- Aphelion: 3.3418 AU
- Perihelion: 1.7471 AU
- Semi-major axis: 2.5444 AU
- Eccentricity: 0.3134
- Orbital period (sidereal): 4.06 yr (1,482 days)
- Mean anomaly: 256.39°
- Mean motion: 0° 14^{m} 34.08^{s} / day
- Inclination: 8.8802°
- Longitude of ascending node: 64.500°
- Argument of perihelion: 311.14°

Physical characteristics
- Dimensions: 9.47±2.13 km 11.391±0.108 km 11.45±0.28 km 11.98±0.15 km 12.39 km (calculated); 12.431±0.062 km 12.88±2.28 km 13.652±2.335 km
- Synodic rotation period: 30±1 h 54.2±0.3 h 54.53±0.01 h
- Geometric albedo: 0.181±0.055; 0.20 (assumed); 0.2021±0.0196; 0.22±0.09; 0.239±0.007; 0.25±0.10; 0.257±0.045
- Spectral type: SMASS = S · S
- Absolute magnitude (H): 11.8 · 11.9 · 11.96±0.39 · 12.12

1550 Tito (provisional designation 1937 WD) is a stony asteroid from the middle region of the asteroid belt, approximately 12 kilometers in diameter. It was discovered on 29 November 1937, by Serbian astronomer Milorad B. Protić at the Belgrade Astronomical Observatory in Serbia. It was named for Yugoslavian statesman Josip Broz Tito.

== Classification and orbit ==
Tito orbits the Sun at a distance of 1.7–3.3 AU once every 4 years and 1 month (1,482 days). Its orbit has an eccentricity of 0.31 and an inclination of 9° with respect to the ecliptic. Tito's observation arc begins 4 years after its official discovery observation, with its first used observation taken at Belgrade in 1941. No precoveries were taken and no prior identifications were made.

== Physical characteristics ==
In the SMASS classification, Tito is characterized as a common S-type asteroid.

=== Rotation period ===
Tito has a rotation period of approximately 54 hours. While this does not make it a slow rotator, it has a significantly longer period than the vast majority of minor planets, which typically spin every 2 to 20 hours around their axis. Rotational lightcurves of Tito were obtained from photometric observations by Walter R. Cooney Jr. in January 2003, who derived a period of 54.2 hours (Δmag 0.23, U=2), by Raymond Poncy in December 2006, who obtained a shorter, provisional period of 30 hours (Δmag 0.16, U=2), and by David Higgins in December 2010, who derived a period of 54.53 hours (Δmag 0.40, U=2).

=== Diameter and albedo ===
According to the surveys carried out by the Spitzer Space Telescope, the Japanese Akari satellite, and NASA's Wide-field Infrared Survey Explorer with its subsequent NEOWISE mission, Tito measures between 9.47 and 13.652 kilometers in diameter, and its surface has an albedo between 0.181 and 0.257. The Collaborative Asteroid Lightcurve Link assumes a standard albedo for stony asteroids of 0.20 and calculates a diameter of 12.39 kilometers with an absolute magnitude of 11.9.

== Naming ==
Tito was named in honour of Josip Broz Tito (1892–1980), leader of the Yugoslavian resistance during the World War II, early enthusiast of the United Nations, and president of former Yugoslavia. The official naming citation was published by the Minor Planet Center on 30 January 1964 (M.P.C. 2277).
