= Zoran Ivanović =

Zoran Ivanović may refer to:

- Zoran Ivanović (sculptor)
- Zoran Ivanović (gymnast)
