= Belgrade Meteorological Station =

Coordinates: 44°47′55.8″N 20°27′52.2″E

Meteorology was first practiced in Serbia when meteorological data was gathered, monitored and recorded on a daily basis, in 1848, in Belgrade. Daily, meteorological forecasts started in 1892. The first meteorologist was Vladimir Jakšić.

While the first meteorological observation post was in a nearby private house, a meteorological observation station (Serbian Meteorološka opservatorija) building was built in 1891 by architect Dimitrije T. Leko, on Vračar's plateau, in Savinac (recognized also as Englezovac, named after Francis Mackenzie).
