= Vidojevica =

Mountain in Serbia

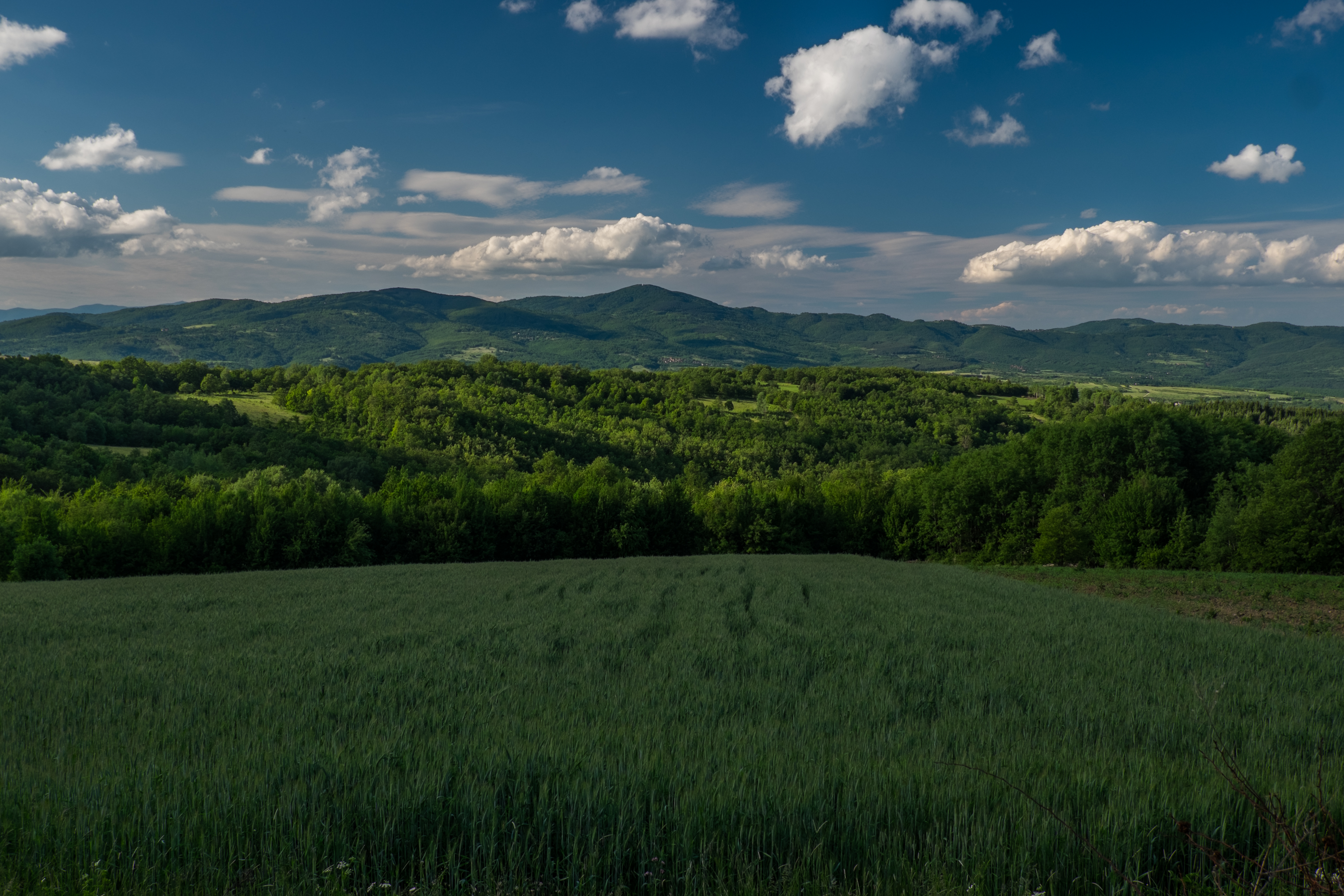

Highest point
- Elevation: 1,155 m (3,789 ft)
- Coordinates: 43°08′29″N 21°33′21″E

Geography
- Location within Serbia
- Location: Southern Serbia
- Parent range: Dinaric Alps

Vidojevica (Serbian: Видојевица) is a mountain in southern Serbia, near the town of Prokuplje. Its highest peak, Bandera, has an elevation of 1,155 m (3,789 ft) above sea level.

On the top of the mountain, there is an astronomical observatory operated by the Belgrade Observatory. The facility is at an altitude of 1,150 m (3,770 ft) and has minimal light pollution. A 60 cm (24 in) Cassegrain telescope was installed in spring of 2011. It was named "Nedeljković", after Milan Nedeljković (1857–1950), the first director and founder of Belgrade Observatory in 1887. In 2016, a 1.4 m (4 ft 7 in) fully robotic telescope was installed at the station. It has been named "Milanković", after geophysicist, civil engineer and astronomer Milutin Milanković, who was the director of the Observatory from 1948 to 1951.

== See also ==
- List of mountains in Serbia
