= Skull Tower =

Heritage site in Niš, Serbia

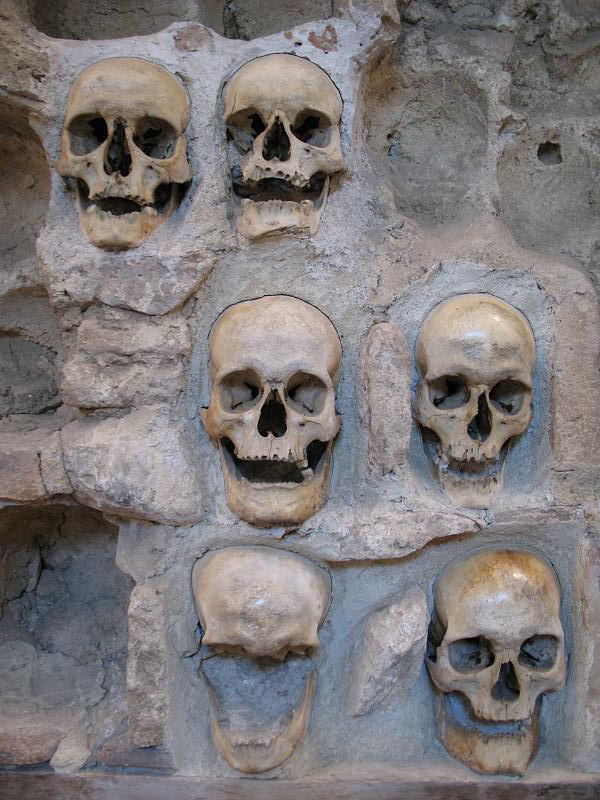
- Detail of a tower wall

- Location of Skull Tower in Serbia
- 43.3122°N 21.9238°E
- Location: Niš, Serbia

History
- Built: 1809

Site notes
- Visitors: 30,000–50,000 (in 2009)

Cultural Heritage of Serbia
- Type: Cultural Monument of Exceptional Importance
- Designated: 6 May 1948
- Reference no.: SK 218

Skull Tower (Serbian Cyrillic: Ћеле кула, romanized: Ćele kula, pronounced [tɕel̩e kula]; Turkish: Kelle kulesi, lit. 'skull tower') is a stone structure embedded with human skulls located in Niš, Serbia. It was constructed by the Ottoman Empire following the Battle of Čegar of May 1809, during the First Serbian Uprising. During the battle, Serbian rebels under the command of Stevan Sinđelić were surrounded by the Ottomans on Čegar Hill, near Niš. Knowing that he and his fighters would be impaled if captured, Sinđelić detonated a powder magazine within the rebel entrenchment, killing himself, his subordinates and the encroaching Ottoman soldiers. The governor of the Rumelia Eyalet, Hurshid Pasha, ordered that a tower be made from the skulls of the fallen rebels. The tower is 4.5 metres (15 ft) high, and originally contained 952 skulls embedded on four sides in 14 rows.

In 1861, Midhat Pasha, the last Ottoman governor of Niš, ordered that Skull Tower be dismantled. Following the Ottomans' withdrawal from Niš in 1878, the structure was partially restored, roofed over with a baldachin and some of the skulls that had been removed from it were returned. Construction of a chapel surrounding the structure commenced in 1892 and was completed in 1894. The chapel was renovated in 1937. A bust of Sinđelić was added the following year. In 1948, Skull Tower and the chapel enclosing it were declared Cultural Monuments of Exceptional Importance and came under the protection of the Socialist Republic of Serbia. Further renovation of the chapel occurred again in 1989.

As of 2026, 58 skulls remain embedded in Skull Tower's walls. The one that is said to belong to Sinđelić is enclosed in a glass container adjacent to the structure. Seen as a symbol of independence by many Serbs, it has become a popular tourist attraction, visited by between 30,000 and 50,000 people annually.

== History ==
=== Construction ===
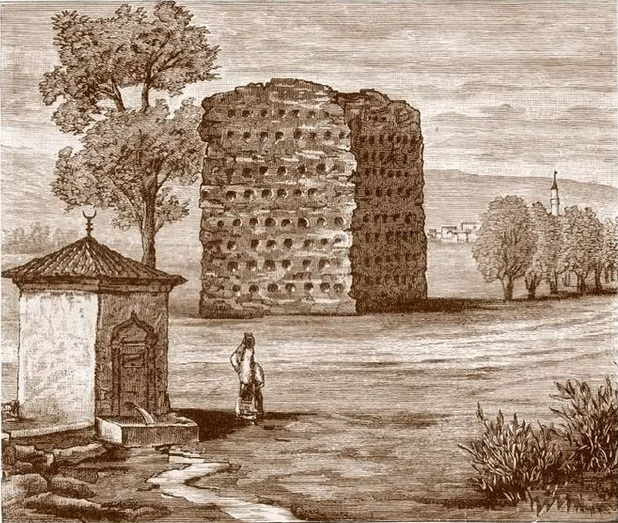
Skull Tower as depicted in an 1863 sketch by Felix Philipp Kanitz

The First Serbian Uprising against Ottoman rule erupted in February 1804, with Karađorđe as its leader. On 19 May 1809, 3,000 Serbian rebels under the command of Stevan Sinđelić were attacked by the Ottomans at Čegar Hill, near the village of Kamenica, in Niš. The rebels were plagued by lack of coordination, largely due to the rivalry between commanders Miloje Petrović and Petar Dobrnjac. As a result, Sinđelić's fighters failed to receive support from the other rebel detachments. The numerically superior Ottomans lost thousands of soldiers in a number of failed attacks against the rebels, but eventually overwhelmed the Serbian lines. Knowing that he and his men would be impaled if captured, Sinđelić fired at his entrenchment's gun powder magazine, setting off a massive explosion. The resulting blast killed him and everyone else in the vicinity.

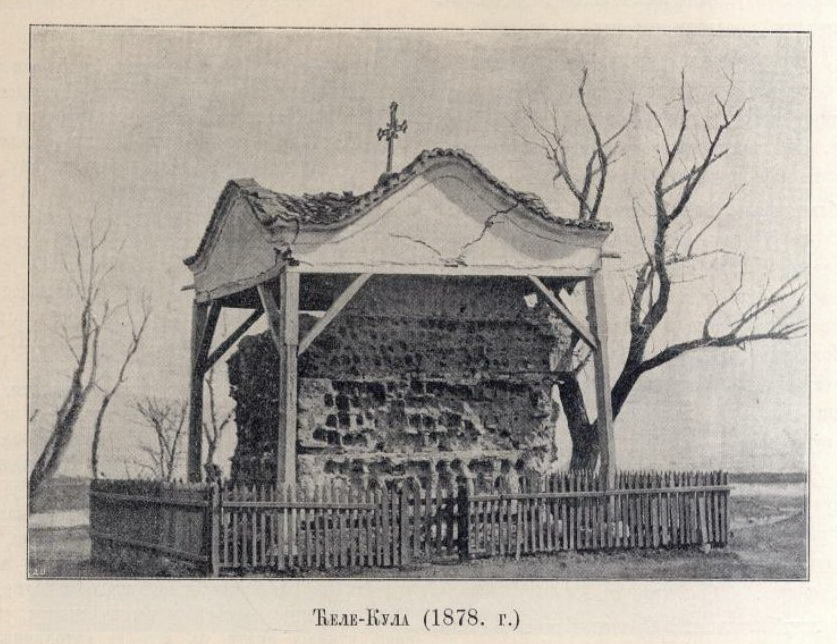
Skull Tower in 1878

After the battle, the governor of the Rumelia Eyalet, Hurshid Pasha, ordered that the heads of Sinđelić and his men be skinned, stuffed and sent to the Ottoman sultan, Mahmud II. Upon being viewed by the sultan, the skulls were then returned to Niš, where the Ottomans built Skull Tower as a warning to residents contemplating rebellion. The Ottoman Empire was known to create tower structures from the skulls of rebel fighters in order to elicit terror among its opponents. Skull Tower was constructed on the road from Istanbul to Belgrade. It was built of sand and limestone. The structure is 4.5 metres (15 ft) high. It originally consisted of 952 skulls embedded on four sides in 14 rows. The locals named it ćele kula, from the Turkish kelle kulesi, which means "skull tower".

The French Romantic poet Alphonse de Lamartine visited the tower while passing through Niš in 1833. By that time, the skulls had already been bleached from exposure to the elements. "My eyes and my heart greeted the remains of those brave men whose cut-off heads made the cornerstone of the independence of their homeland," de Lamartine later wrote. "May the Serbs keep this monument! It will always teach their children the value of the independence of a people, showing them the real price their fathers had to pay for it." De Lamartine's account attracted many Western travellers to Niš. Skull Tower was also mentioned in the works of the British travel writer Alexander William Kinglake, published in 1849.

=== Dismantling and conservation ===
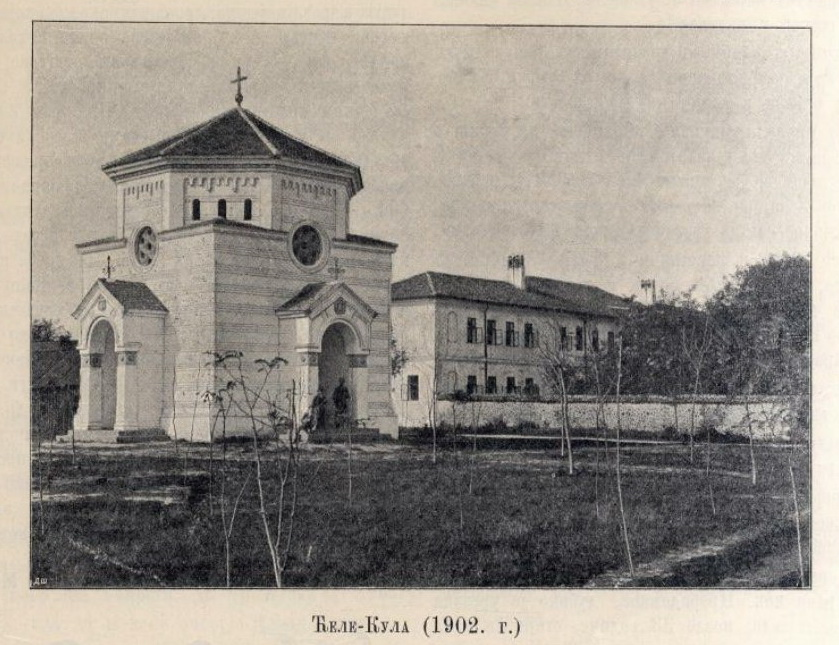
The chapel containing the tower, 1902

In the years following its construction, many skulls fell out from the tower walls, some were taken away for burial by relatives thinking they could identify the skulls of their deceased family members, and some were taken by souvenir hunters. Midhat Pasha, the last Ottoman governor of Niš, ordered that Skull Tower be dismantled in 1861. He realized that the structure no longer served as an effective means of discouraging potential rebels and only fostered resentment against the Ottomans, reminding locals of the empire's cruelty. During the dismantling, the remaining skulls were removed from the tower.

After the Ottomans withdrew from Niš in 1878, the Royal Serbian Army scoured the town and its surroundings in search of the missing skulls. One was found embedded deep inside the tower walls and sent to the National Museum in Belgrade. This was followed by the construction of a roof baldachin, which was topped off with a cross. This is how the structure is depicted in an 1883 painting by the realist Đorđe Krstić. In 1892, work commenced on the construction of a chapel that was to enclose the tower. The foundations of the chapel, designed by the architect Dimitrije T. Leko, were consecrated in 1894. A plaque dedicated near the chapel in 1904 reads: "To the first Serbian liberators after Kosovo."

The chapel was renovated in 1937 and a bust of Sinđelić was added the following year. In 1948, Skull Tower and the chapel were declared Cultural Monuments of Exceptional Importance and came under the protection of the Socialist Republic of Serbia. Further renovation of the chapel occurred again in 1989. As of 2026, 58 skulls remain embedded in the tower walls. The one said to belong to Sinđelić rests in a glass container adjacent to the structure.

== Legacy ==
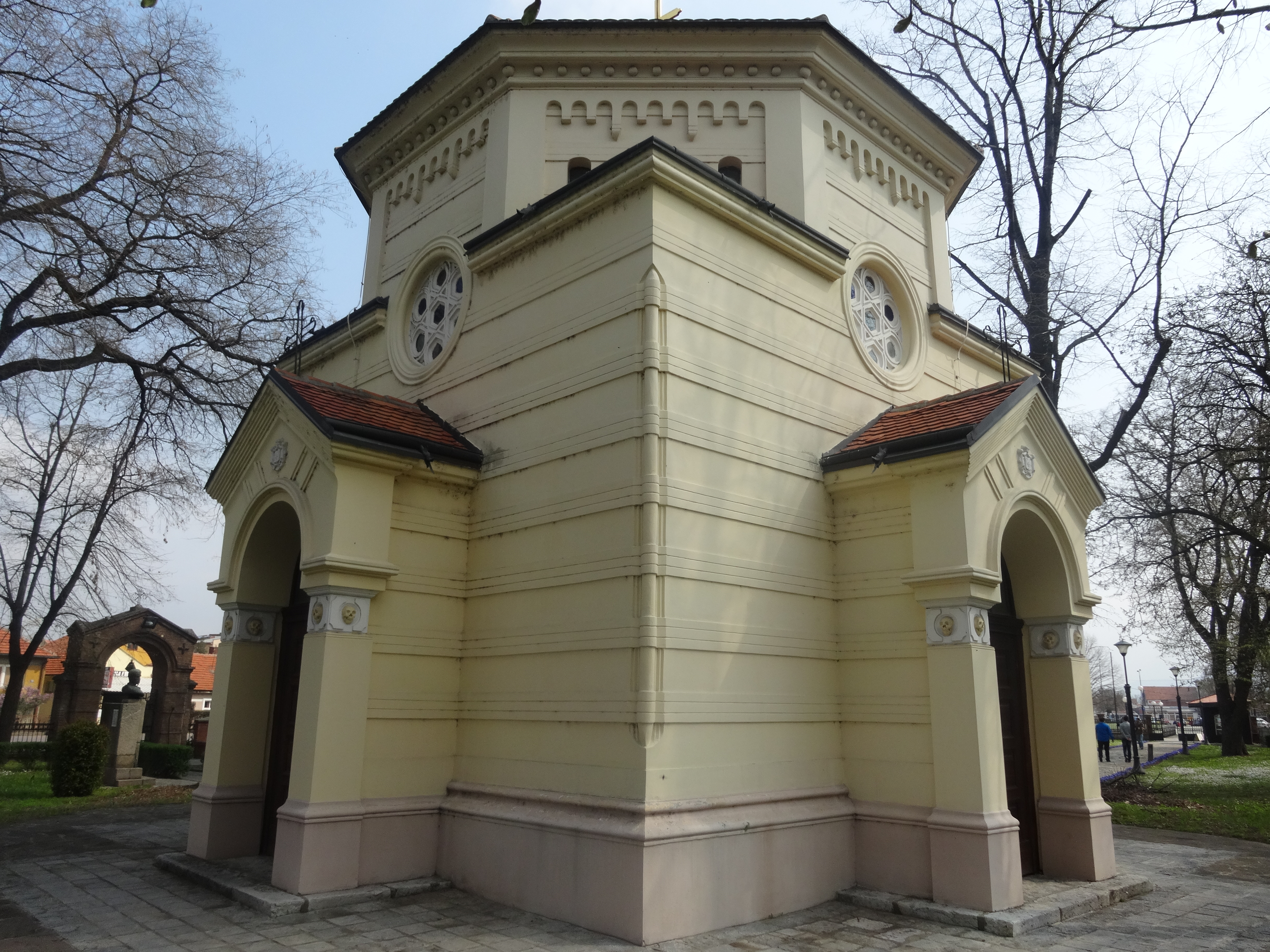
The chapel enclosing Skull Tower, 2014

Skull Tower remains one of the most prominent symbols of Ottoman rule in Serbia. It "continues to serve as an important heritage site for Serbian national identity," the political scientist Bilgesu Sümer writes. In Serbia, and among Serbs both inside and outside the country, it is considered a symbol of the country's struggle for independence from the Ottoman Empire. In the centuries following its construction, it has become a place of Serb pilgrimage. Prior to the breakup of Yugoslavia, tens of thousands of schoolchildren from across Yugoslavia visited the structure. Skull Tower remains one of the most visited destinations in Serbia, attracting between 30,000 and 50,000 visitors annually.

The Serbian poet Milan Đorđević considers Skull Tower to be emblematic of what he terms "Balkan horror". Drawing on themes from Serbian history, in 1957, composer Dušan Radić composed the cantata Ćele kula. Skull Tower is also the subject of the eponymous fourth cycle of modernist Vasko Popa's fourth collection of poems, Uspravna zemlja (Earth Erect), which was completed in 1971. The structure was featured on the cover of the Serbian rock band Riblja Čorba's 1985 album Istina, with the band members' faces embedded in the tower walls. The cover was designed by the artist Jugoslav Vlahović.

An exhibition at the Military Museum in Belgrade contains a replica of the tower. In 2024, a group of anthropologists from Serbia began the forensic reconstruction of the faces of the remaining skulls; a DNA analysis of the skulls was not carried out as this would damage both the skulls and the tower. The project was funded with private donations from Serbia and several surrounding countries.

== Gallery ==
Skull Tower

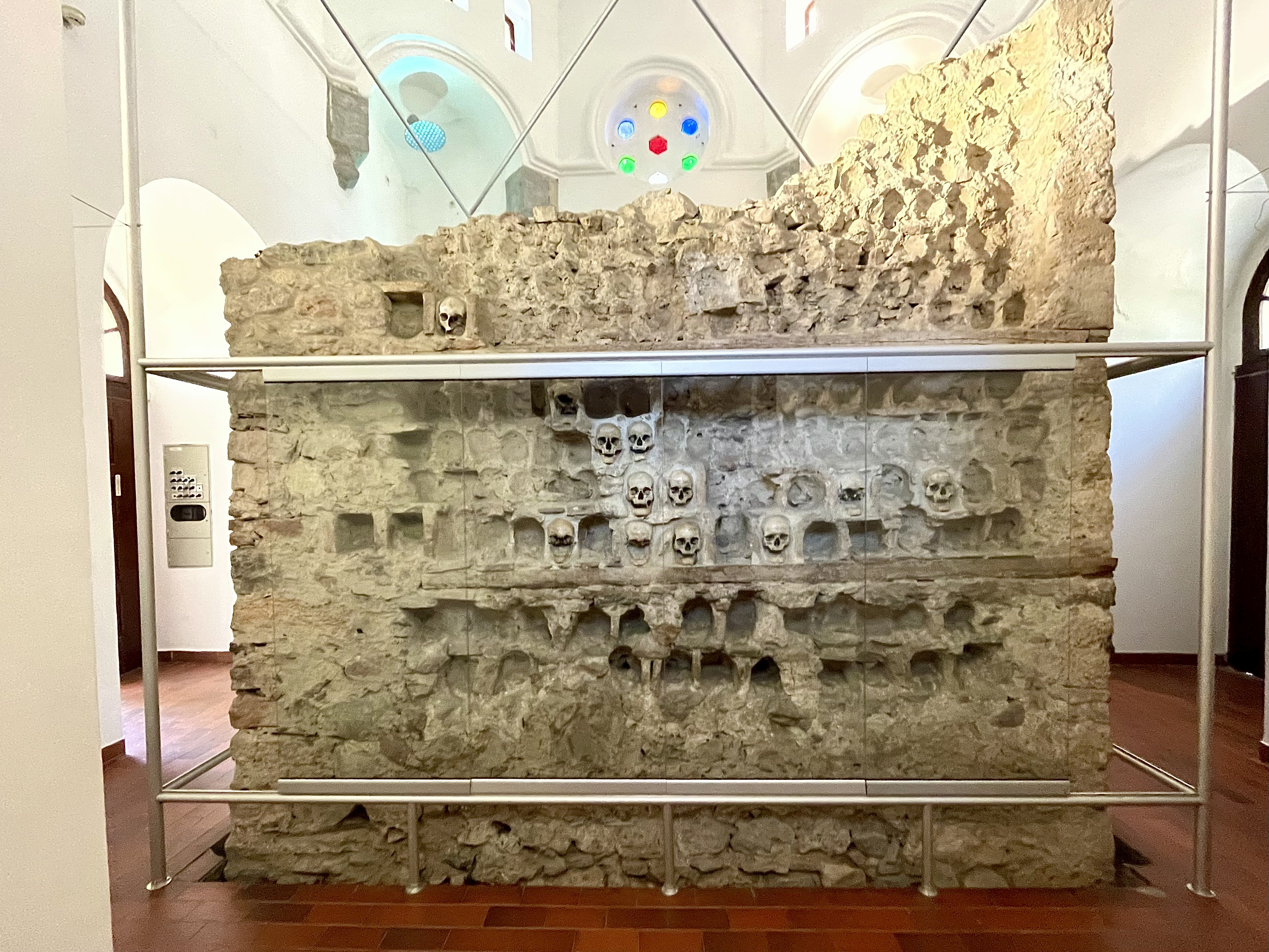
South side

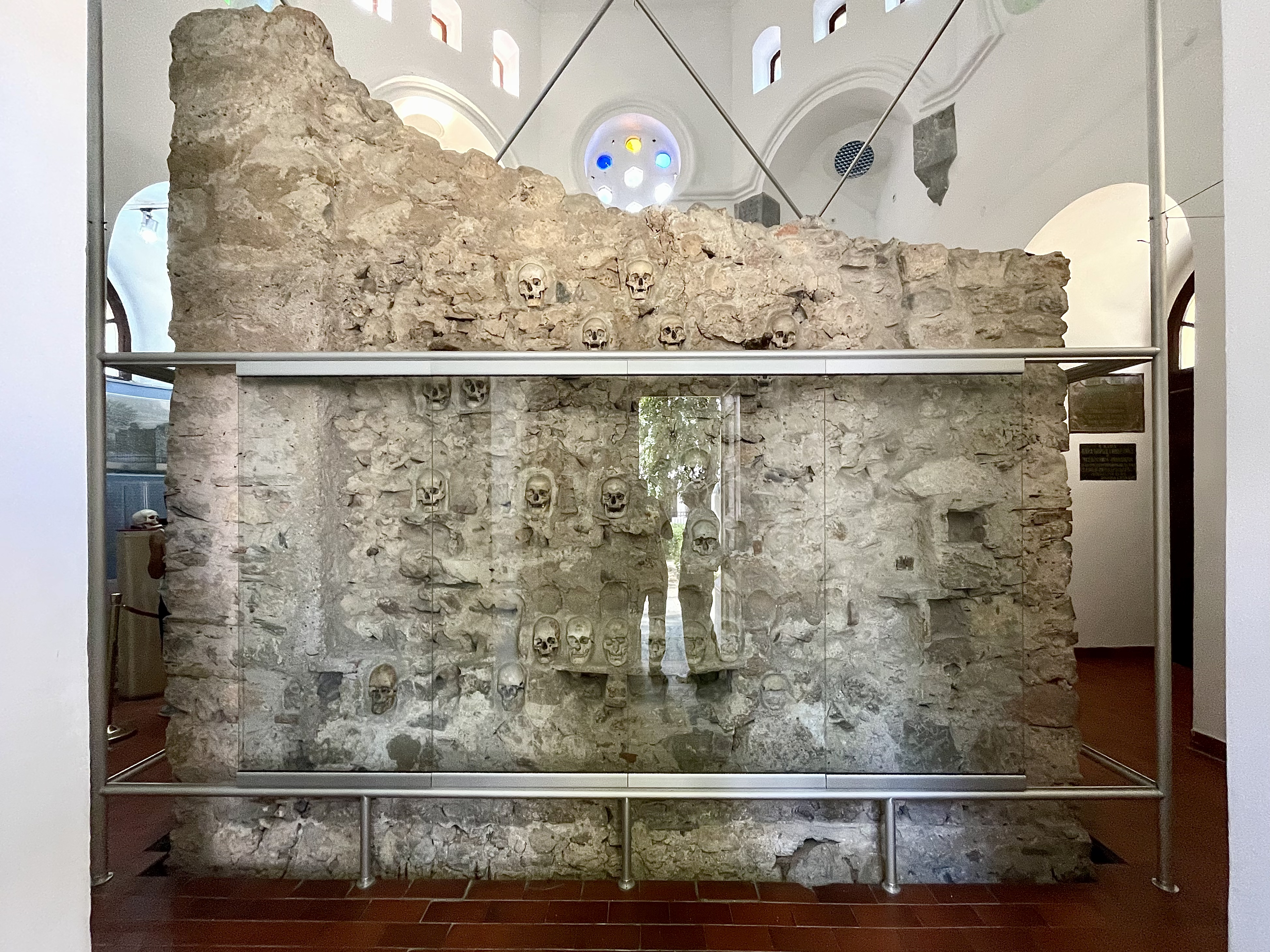
North side

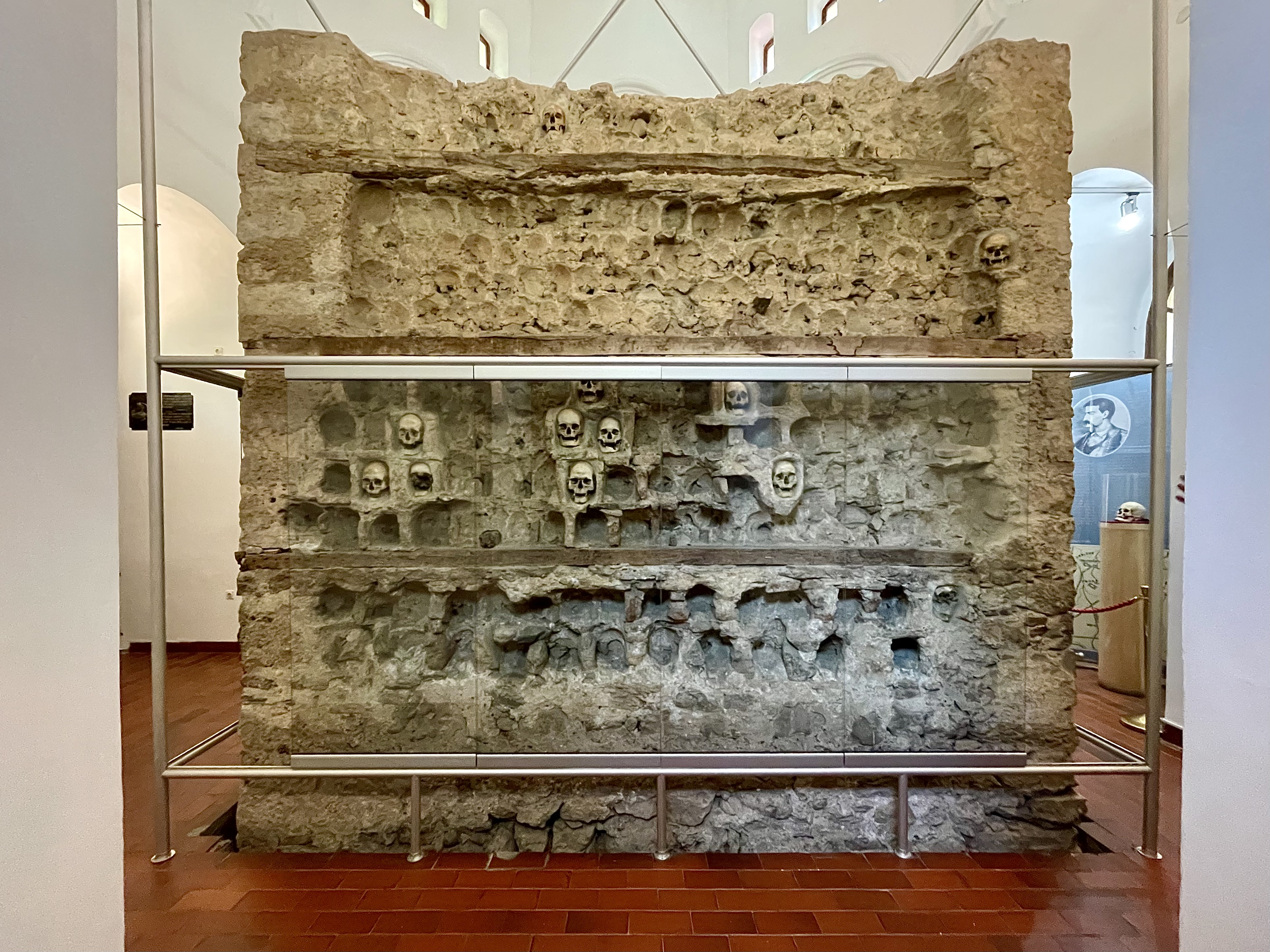
East side

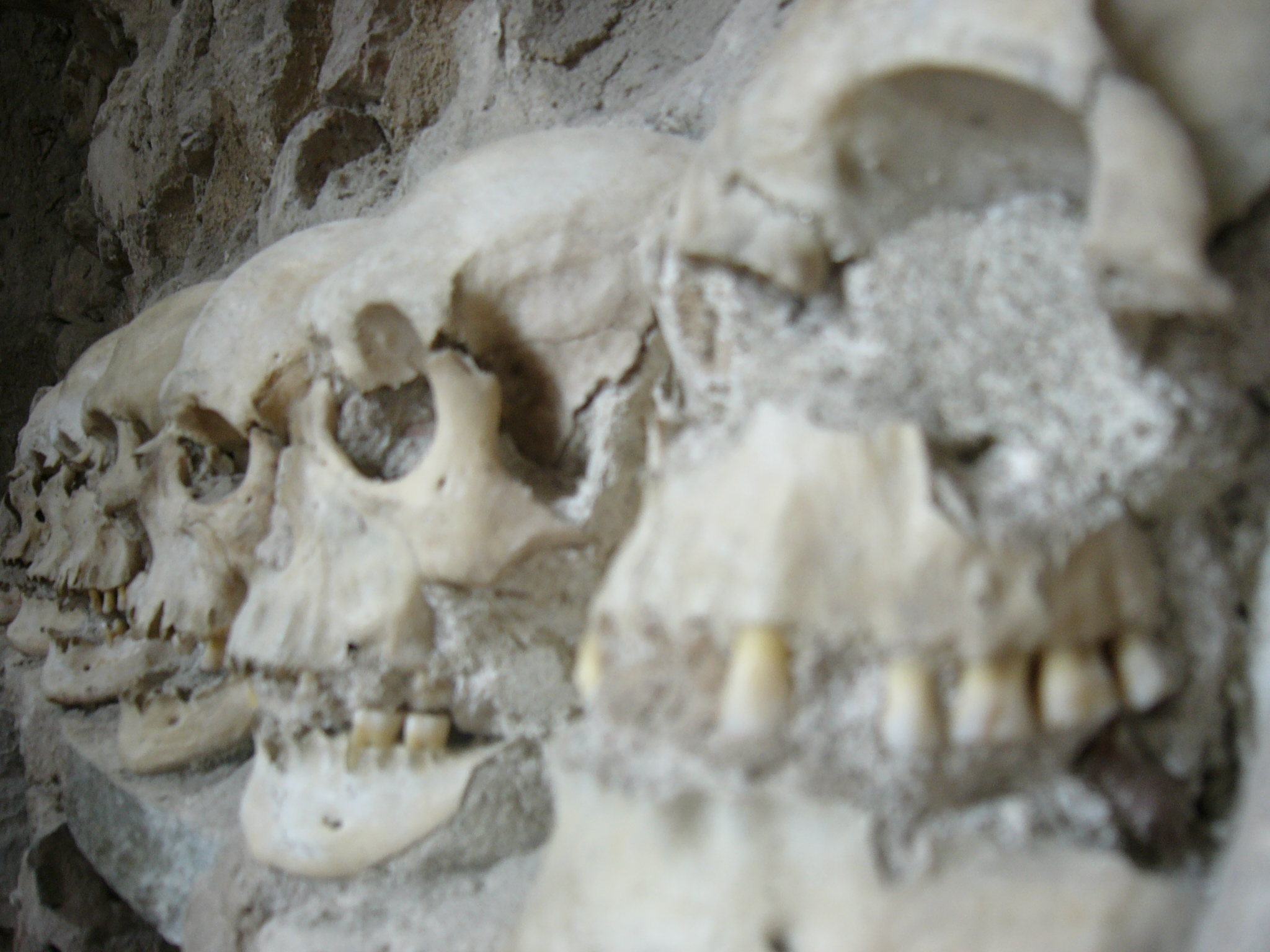
Detail of a row of skulls

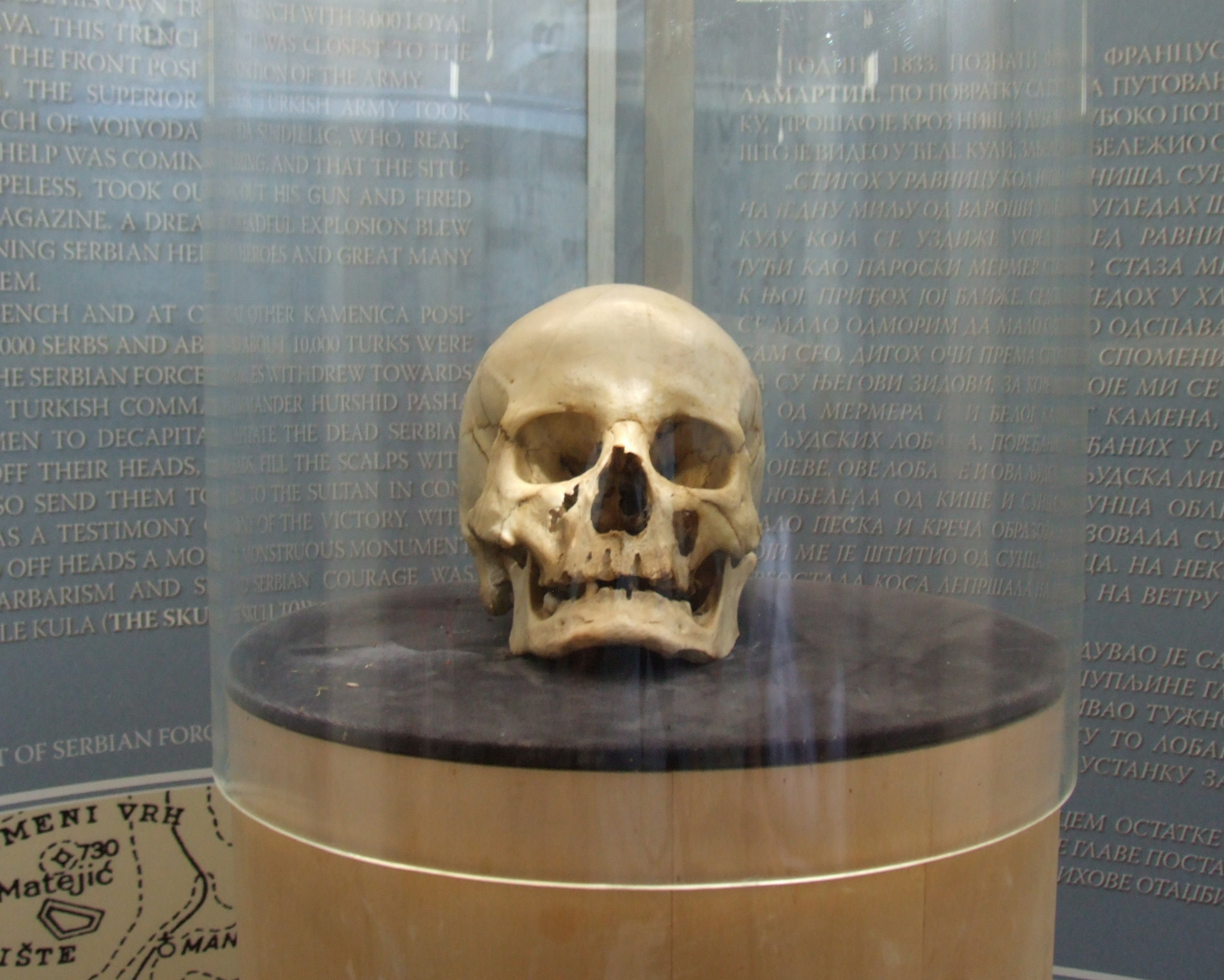
Skull that is said to have belonged to Stevan Sinđelić
