= Milorad B. Protić =

Serbian astronomer

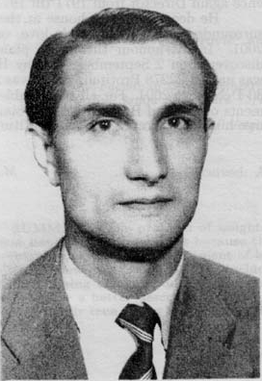
Milorad B. Protić

Minor planets discovered: 7
1517 Beograd	20 March 1938
1550 Tito	29 November 1937
1554 Yugoslavia	6 September 1940
1564 Srbija	15 October 1936
1675 Simonida	20 March 1938
2244 Tesla	22 October 1952
2348 Michkovitch	10 January 1939

Milorad B. Protić (Serbian Cyrillic: Милорад Б. Протић; 19 September 1911, Belgrade – 29 October 2001, Belgrade) was a Serbian astronomer, discoverer of comets and minor planets, and three times director of the Belgrade Observatory.

== Life and work ==
Protić finished a technical secondary school in 1921 and worked as a technical draftsman until 1931. He joined the Belgrade Observatory in 1932, while in 1936 he started observations of minor planets, comets, and satellites, which have been continuously performed until the present-day.

Protić is credited by the Minor Planet Center with the discovery of 7 numbered asteroids during 1936–1952, including 1675 Simonida, named after queen Simonida, wife of medieval Serbian king Stefan Milutin, and 2348 Michkovitch, a rare Erigone asteroid named after Vojislav Mišković (1892–1976), who was a member of the Serbian Academy of Sciences and Arts and head of the Belgrade Observatory. Protić also independently discovered comet C/1947 Y1.

Protić died on 29 October 2001 in Belgrade. The main-belt asteroid 22278 Protitch, discovered by Henri Debehogne at ESO's Chilean La Silla site in 1983, was named in his memory. Naming citation was published on 30 December 2001 (M.P.C. 44186).

Also, the outer main-belt asteroid 1724 Vladimir is named after Protić's grandson Vladimir Benišek, while 5397 Vojislava is named after Vojislava Protić-Benišek, his daughter, who has been a member of the observatory's staff since 1972, where she continues her father's work on celestial mechanics and minor planets, together with her son.

== See also ==
- Category:Erigone asteroids
