= 1378 Leonce =

Main-belt asteroid

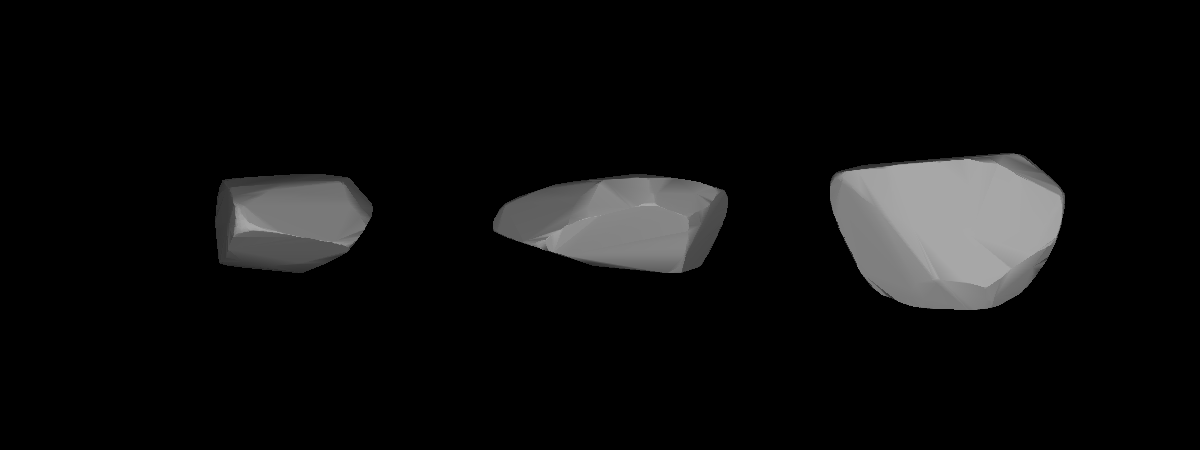
- Lightcurve-based 3D-model of Leonce

Discovery
- Discovered by: F. Rigaux
- Discovery site: Uccle Obs.
- Discovery date: 21 February 1936

Designations
- Named after: Leonce Rigaux (discoverer's father)
- Alternative designations: 1936 DB · 1958 FG; 1958 GY · 1962 KB; A915 RC · A915 WA
- Minor planet category: main-belt · (inner); Nysa–Polana complex

Orbital characteristics
- Epoch 4 September 2017 (JD 2458000.5)
- Uncertainty parameter 0
- Observation arc: 101.54 yr (37,088 days)
- Aphelion: 2.7300 AU
- Perihelion: 2.0187 AU
- Semi-major axis: 2.3743 AU
- Eccentricity: 0.1498
- Orbital period (sidereal): 3.66 yr (1,336 days)
- Mean anomaly: 38.698°
- Mean motion: 0° 16^{m} 9.84^{s} / day
- Inclination: 3.5913°
- Longitude of ascending node: 43.568°
- Argument of perihelion: 202.15°

Physical characteristics
- Dimensions: 14.94±3.81 km 18.16 km (derived); 18.18±1.4 km 20.54±0.13 km 21.228±0.070 km 22.20±0.33 km 22.456±0.170 km
- Synodic rotation period: 4.3250±0.0002 h 4.325±0.001 h 4.32527±0.00005 h 4.3586±0.0002 h
- Geometric albedo: 0.0348±0.0046; 0.053±0.002; 0.061±0.002; 0.0706 (derived); 0.0773±0.013; 0.10±0.05
- Spectral type: C (assumed)
- Absolute magnitude (H): 11.94±0.22 · 12.10 · 12.20

1378 Leonce, provisional designation 1936 DB, is a dark asteroid from the inner regions of the asteroid belt, approximately 19 kilometers in diameter. It was discovered on 21 February 1936, by Belgian astronomer Fernand Rigaux at the Royal Observatory of Belgium in Uccle, who named it after his father, Leonce Rigaux.

== Orbit and classification ==
Leonce orbits the Sun in the inner main asteroid belt at a distance of 2.0–2.7 AU, once every 3 years and 8 months (1,336 days). Its orbit has an eccentricity of 0.15 and an inclination of 4° with respect to the ecliptic. It is a member of the Nysa–Polana complex, a collection of overlapping asteroid families in the inner main belt.

The asteroid was first identified as 1915 RC at Heidelberg Observatory in September 1915. One week later, the body's observation arc begins at Bergedorf Observatory, more than 20 years prior to its official discovery observation at Uccle.

== Physical characteristics ==
Leonce is an assumed carbonaceous C-type asteroid.

=== Rotation period and poles ===
In 2002, 2007 and 2017, three rotational light curves of Leonce were obtained from photometric observations by amateur astronomers René Roy, Laurent Bernasconi and Daniel Klinglesmith and colleagues at Etscorn Observatory (719), respectively. Analysis gave a well-defined light curve with a consolidated rotation period of 4.3250 hours and a brightness amplitude between 0.49 and 0.63 magnitude (U=3/3/3).

In addition a modeled light curve, using photometric data from various sources, gave a period of 4.32527 hours, as well as two spin axes of (210.0°, −67.0°) and (46.0°, −77.0°) in ecliptic coordinates.

=== Diameter and albedo ===
According to the surveys carried out by the Infrared Astronomical Satellite IRAS, the Japanese Akari satellite and the NEOWISE mission of NASA's Wide-field Infrared Survey Explorer, Leonce measures between 14.94 and 22.456 kilometers in diameter and its surface has an albedo between 0.0348 and 0.10.

The Collaborative Asteroid Lightcurve Link derives an albedo of 0.0706 and a diameter of 18.16 kilometers based on an absolute magnitude of 12.2.

== Naming ==
This minor planet was named after Leonce Rigaux, father of the discoverer astronomer Fernand Rigaux. The official naming citation was mentioned in The Names of the Minor Planets by Paul Herget in 1955 (H 125).
