= 1605 Milankovitch =

Eoan asteroid

Discovery
- Discovered by: P. Đurković
- Discovery site: Uccle Obs.
- Discovery date: 13 April 1936

Designations
- Named after: Milutin Milanković (Serbian scientist)
- Alternative designations: 1936 GA · 1925 DC; 1931 KB · 1938 ST; 1941 FA · 1946 FF; 1949 UC_{1} · 1968 KP; A907 UB
- Minor planet category: main-belt · Eos

Orbital characteristics
- Epoch 4 September 2017 (JD 2458000.5)
- Uncertainty parameter 0
- Observation arc: 80.69 yr (29,472 days)
- Aphelion: 3.2472 AU
- Perihelion: 2.7796 AU
- Semi-major axis: 3.0134 AU
- Eccentricity: 0.0776
- Orbital period (sidereal): 5.23 yr (1,911 days)
- Mean anomaly: 310.79°
- Mean motion: 0° 11^{m} 18.24^{s} / day
- Inclination: 10.562°
- Longitude of ascending node: 173.74°
- Argument of perihelion: 276.14°

Physical characteristics
- Dimensions: 27.78±3.57 km 29.404±0.197 km 29.598±0.217; 32.38 km (derived); 32.47±1.5 km (IRAS:6); 33.80±0.42 km
- Synodic rotation period: 11.60±0.05 h 11.63±0.03 h
- Geometric albedo: 0.1401 (derived); 0.142±0.004; 0.1529±0.015 (IRAS:6); 0.184±0.034; 0.1902±0.0991; 0.235±0.322
- Spectral type: M · LS · S
- Absolute magnitude (H): 9.97 · 10.1 · 10.19±0.29 · 10.2

1605 Milankovitch, provisional designation 1936 GA, is an Eoan asteroid from the outer region of the asteroid belt, approximately 31 kilometers in diameter. It was named after Serbian scientist Milutin Milanković.

== Discovery ==
Milankovitch was discovered on 13 April 1936, by Serbian astronomer Petar Đurković at the Royal Observatory of Belgium in Uccle, Belgium. Two nights later, the body was independently discovered by Polish astronomers Jan Piegza and Tadeusz Banachiewicz at Cracow and Warsaw, respectively.

It was first identified as A907 UB at the U.S. Taunton Observatory (803) in 1907. However, it remained unused – as did the subsequent observations at both Simeiz and Lowell Observatory in 1925 and 1931, respectively. The body's observation arc begins with its official discovery observation at Uccle in 1936.

== Orbit and classification ==
Milankovitch is a member of the Eos family, an orbital group of more than 4,000 asteroids, which are well known for mostly being of stony composition.

It orbits the Sun in the outer main-belt at a distance of 2.8–3.2 AU once every 5 years and 3 months (1,911 days). Its orbit has an eccentricity of 0.08 and an inclination of 11° with respect to the ecliptic.

== Physical characteristics ==
Milankovitch is classified as a metallic M-type by the NEOWISE mission, as a stony S-type by the Collaborative Asteroid Lightcurve Link (CALL), and as a LS-type – a transitional form between the common S-type and rare L-type asteroids – by Pan-STARRS1' large-scale survey.

=== Rotation period ===
In April 2004, a rotational lightcurve of Milankovitch was obtained from photometric observations by American amateur astronomer Walter R. Cooney Jr. It gave a rotation period of 11.60±0.05 hours with a brightness variation of 0.12 magnitude (U=2). In October 2006, French astronomer Pierre Antonini obtained another lightcurve, which gave a similar period of 11.63±0.03 and an amplitude of 0.14 magnitude (U=2).

=== Diameter and albedo ===
According to the space-based surveys carried out by the Infrared Astronomical Satellite IRAS, the Japanese Akari satellite, and NASA's Wide-field Infrared Survey Explorer with its subsequent NEOWISE mission, Milankovitch measures between 27.8 and 33.8 kilometers in diameter and its surface has an albedo between 0.142 and 0.235. CALL derives an albedo of 0.140 and a diameter of 32.4 kilometers with an absolute magnitude of 10.2.

== Naming ==
This minor planet was named in memory of Serbian-Yugoslav scientist Milutin Milanković (1879–1958), best known for his Milankovitch cycles, a theory of celestial mechanics that describes the collective effects of changes in the Earth's movements upon its climate. He is also honored by the lunar crater Milankovič, and by the Martian crater Milankovič. The approved naming citation was published by the Minor Planet Center on 1 August 1980 (M.P.C. 5449).
