= Dimitrije T. Leko =

Serbian architect (1863–1914)

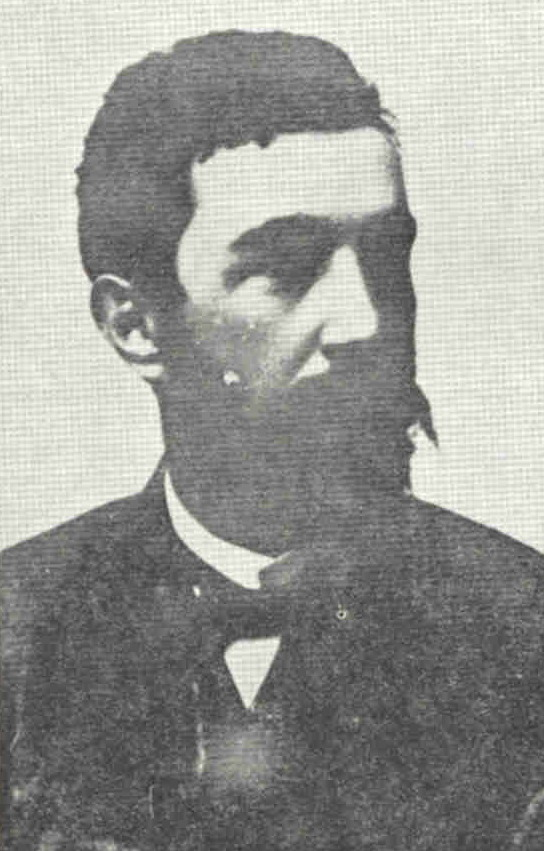
- Portrait of Dimitrije T. Leko
- Born: 22 January 1863; Belgrade, Principality of Serbia
- Died: 24 September 1914 (aged 51); Kragujevac, Kingdom of Serbia
- Occupation: Architect

Dimitrije "Mita" T. Leko (Serbian Cyrillic: Димитрије Т. Леко; January 22, 1863 – September 24, 1914) was a Serbian architect and urbanist.

== Biography ==
He spent most of his life outside Serbia and finished high school in Winterthur before studying architecture at the universities in Zürich (Technische Hochschule), Aachen, and Munich. After returning to Belgrade at the end of the 19th century, he tried to implement the model of contemporary urbanism of western Europe in Belgrade. He designed some of the most important and technically perfected buildings in Belgrade of his time, such as the Belgrade Meteorological Station in 1891, the Vučo House on Slavija Square in 1893 (the first McDonald's restaurant in Eastern Europe was opened in this building on March 24, 1988), the New Military Academy on Nemanja Street (Немањина улица) in 1899 (today's Belgrade City Museum), the Athens Palace on Terazije Square in 1902, Đorđe Vučo's house on the Sava River on Karađorđe Street (Карађорђева улица) in 1908, the school buildings in Mackenzie Street (Улица Макензијева) and Gavrilo Princip Street (Улица Гаврила Принципа) and many other structures and mansions. He also designed a chapel that was built to enclose what was left of the Skull Tower in Niš. Several of his works were financed by one of the wealthiest merchants in Belgrade at the end of the 19th century, Đorđe Vučo. Leko also won first prizes on the open competitions for the regulation of Terazije Square, Little Kalemegdan, and the city of Skopje. However, these projects were never fully realized.

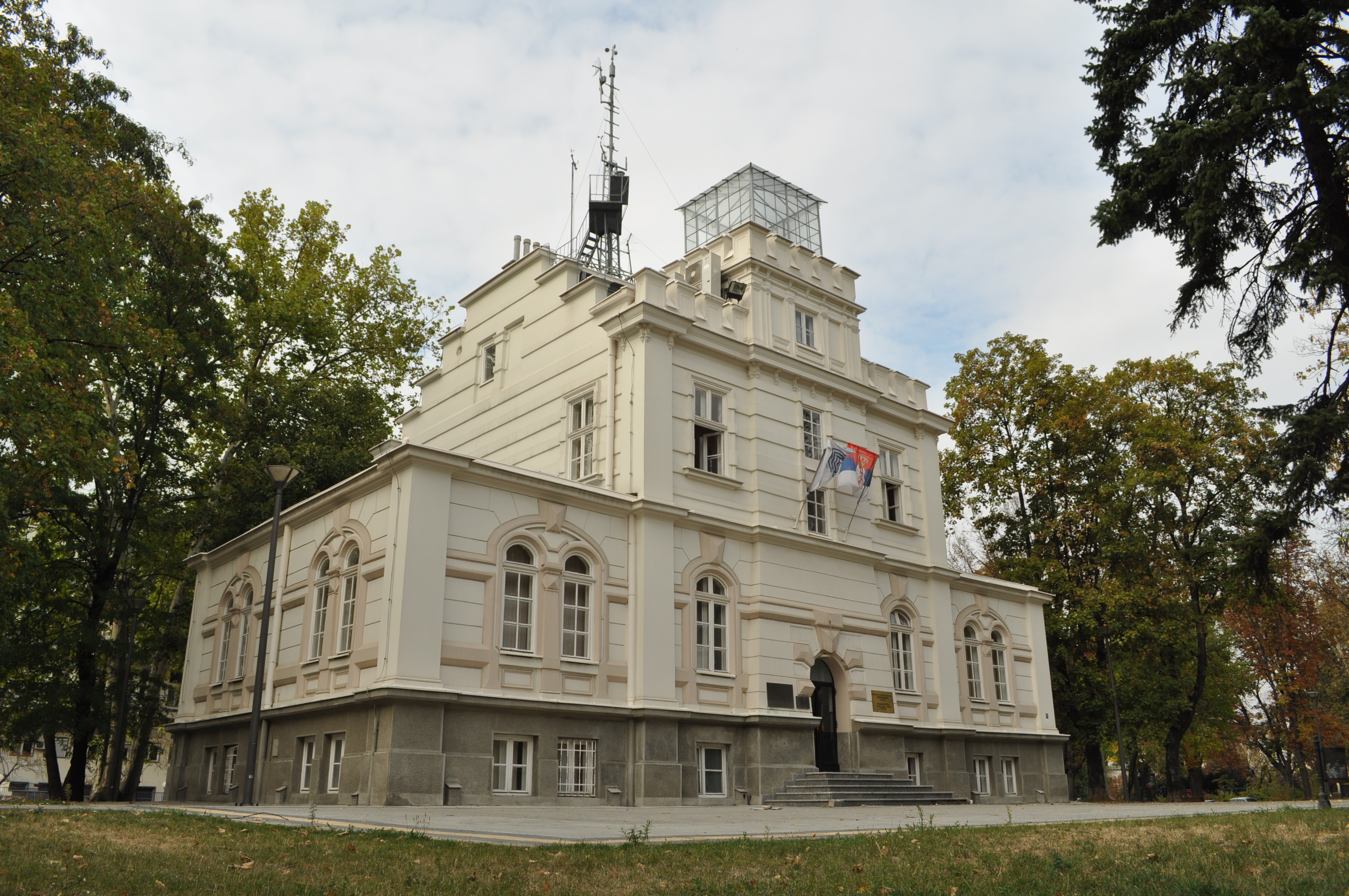
Astronomical Observatory and Meteorological Observatory of Belgrade University.

Leko was also a very harsh critic of the urban development of Belgrade. He was often labelled as "too provocative" and "revolutionary" in his criticism of urbanism in Belgrade, and some of the problems he addressed, such as the problem of the regulation of the Terazije Terrace and the banks of the Sava River, still remain unsolved.

Leko was a member of Belgrade's prestigious Leko family. His brother, Marko Leko, was a renowned chemist. A street in the Belgrade suburb of Borča bears Dimitrije T. Leko's name.
