= Vojislav Mišković =

Serbian astronomer

Vojislav Mišković (Serbian Cyrillic: Војислав Мишковић; 1892, Fužine – 1976, Belgrade) was a Yugoslav astronomer, head of the Belgrade Observatory in 1926–1950 and 1951–1954.
