= Republic Hydrometeorological Institute of Serbia =

Serbian meteorological service

- Републички Хидрометеоролошки завод Србије (РХМЗ); Republički hidrometeorološki zavod Srbije (RHMZ)
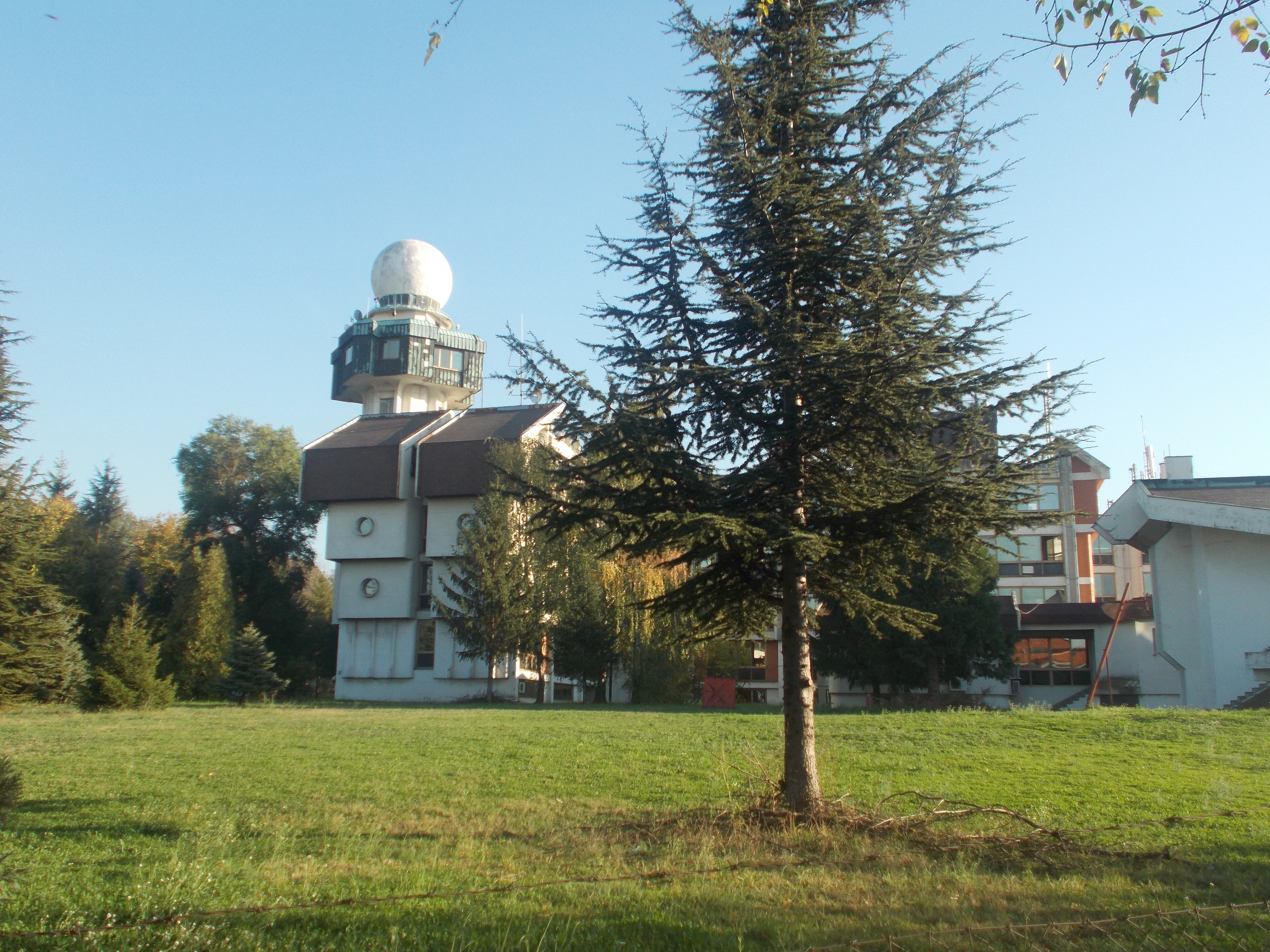
- Seat of the institute in Belgrade's neighborhood of Košutnjak

Agency overview
- Formed: 27 September 1888
- Preceding agency: Vladimir Jakšić's meteo-grid from 1 January 1848
- Headquarters: 66 Kneza Višeslava Street, Belgrade, Serbia; 44.771664°N 20.424563°E
- Website: www.hidmet.gov.rs/index.php

The Republic Hydrometeorological Institute of Serbia (Serbian: Републички Хидрометеоролошки завод Србије (РХМЗ), Republički hidrometeorološki zavod Srbije (RHMZ)) is the national meteorological and hydrological service of Serbia.

== Origin ==
=== Pre-institute weather tracking ===
First "meteorologists" in Serbia were the medieval church and monastery chroniclers who wrote about the weather occurrences which they observed. Scholar Ljubomir Stojanović compiled old manuscripts and arranged them in 7 volumes under the umbrella title Old Serbian records and inscriptions, which were published by the Serbian Royal Academy from 1902 to 1927 as part of its edition Collection for history, language and literature. Meteorologist and geographer Pavle Vujević used these, so as several other books, to extract all the weather data and published them in 1931 work Historical documents about the variations of the climate on the territory of the Kingdom of Yugoslavia. He covered the period from 1358 to 1864, when the meteorology already began the instrumental monitoring of the weather in Serbia.

=== Vladimir Jakšić's meteo-grid ===
Vladimir Jakšić, then only a clerk in the Ministry of Finance and later a professor at the Belgrade Lyceum, on his own accord set a weather station in the backyard of his house in Belgrade's neighborhood of Senjak. He began daily measurements from 1 January 1848, and continued until his death in 1899. He was observing the weather and writing down the temperature, humidity, precipitations, wind speed and atmospheric pressure and his work became the foundation of the meteorology development in Serbia. Already by 1851, Jakšić was able to write first study on the climate of Belgrade. He also left important data on the fluctuation of the water level in the Sava river.

In 1856, further weather stations were set in 20 cities across Serbia, while in 1857 that number grew to 27. The grid, still only a private, individual enterprise, was the most dense meteorological grid in Europe at the time. However, Jaksić in 1863 accepted a job at the Ministry of Finance where he founded a Department of Statistics. From that moment the number of meteorological stations began to decrease rapidly. The only weather station which survived was the first, in the Jakšić's backyard.

=== Old observatory ===
In 1879, Milan Nedeljković received a scholarship to continue his education in Paris at the Sorbonne. He studied mathematics and at the College de France extraordinary studying physics. In Paris Observatory the first School of Astronomy was formed, which Nedeljkovic successfully completed. During the study he also finished courses in meteorology, precision mechanics and seismology. After five years, he returned in 1884 in Belgrade and became a professor of astronomy and meteorology at the Great School. He launched a campaign for the establishment of observatory at Grand School, but was rejected because of the financial situation. Finally, after three years, the decree of the founding of the Observatory was signed on 7 April [O.S. 26 March] 1887 by the Minister of Education and Church Affaires of Kingdom of Serbia Milan Kujundžić Aberdar on the initiative of professor Nedeljković.

Nedeljković was appointed first director. On 1 July 1887 Nedeljković took over as the head of the provisory astronomical and meteorological observatory which was located in the rented house of the Gajzler family at 66 Svetozara Markovića Street. Located at the crossroads of the Vojvode Milenka and Svetozara Markovića streets in the historical neighborhood of Vračar (though today administratively in the municipality of Savski Venac), the house still stands today.

== History ==
=== Foundation ===
Adopting the request of Nedeljković, a new Minister of Education, Vladan Đorđević passed on 27 September 1888, on the Feast of the Cross day, the Regulation on the establishment of unified network of meteorological stations in the Kingdom of Serbia. Then Observatory become Central meteorological station for data collection.

=== Astronomical-meteorological observatory ===
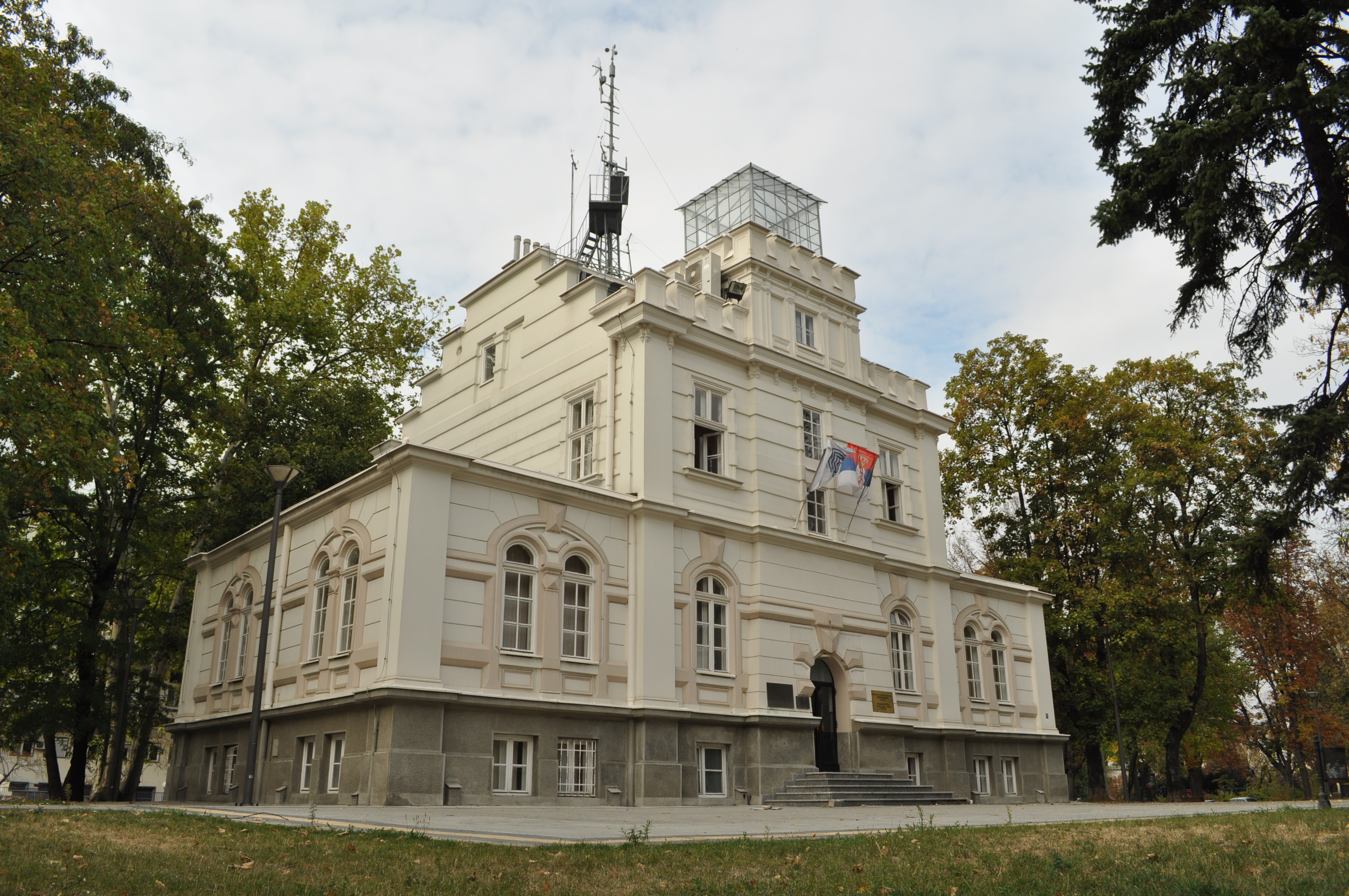
Astronomical and meteorological observatory from 1891 to 1924

Observatory was operating in the Gajzler house until 1 May 1891, when it was moved into its own building. specifically constructed for that purpose at 8 Bulevar Oslobođenja. It was constructed according to the design of architect Dimitrije T. Leko and equipped with the modern small instruments for astronomical and meteorological observations. Also, then are made in funcion two small astronomical pavilion. The Observatory was a "workshop" for practical training for the students of the Grand School and People's Observatory (on an artificial hill were located Bardu field glasses) where the most frequent guests were students, citizens and prominent persons – for example, in 1910, Halley's Comet was observed. Apart from its importance for astronomy and meteorology, the newly built Observatory, headed by Nedeljković, was a cradle of the seismic and geomagnetic researches in Serbia. Thanks to Nedeljković's colleague and friend Miklós Konkoly, the founder of modern Hungarian astronomy and meteorology, the observatory was equipped with a seismograph. New observatory building was located close to the previous, across the Vračar plateau. In the 1950s a park was planted around it which in 2010 was named Park Milutin Milanković.

During the withdrawal from Belgrade at the end of the World War I in 1918, the Austro-Hungarian army destroyed all the instruments in the observatory. Nedeljković managed to acquire instruments for the new observatory from the war reparations from Germany, not spending the state money. The total value of the instruments he obtained was three times higher than the entire cost of the construction of the new observatory building. Instruments arrived in 1922.

In 1924, by the ruling of the Faculty Council the Observatory was divided into two separate institutions: Astronomical Observatory and Meteorological Observatory of Belgrade University.

=== Development ===
In August 1902, the institute began a coded international exchange of weather data and started making its first weather forecasts. Since 1912, the daily Politika began publishing institute's weather reports and forecasts. The meteorology especially developed after Vujović took over the tenure of the meteorological observatory chief in the early 20th century. This was also a period when Milutin Milanković began his work on climatology.

At the invitation of the organizers, representatives of the FHMI signed on 22 September 1947 in Washington, a Convention on the establishment of the World Meteorological Organization (WMO). FHMI was one of the 45 world meteorological services, which were founders of WMO. After the FHMI was abolished in April 2003, the RHSS was entrusted as its legal successor with all its responsibilities, especially the international cooperation.
