= Fernand Rigaux =

Belgian astronomer

Minor planets discovered: 8
1292 Luce	17 September 1933	MPC
1378 Leonce	21 February 1936	MPC
1458 Mineura	1 September 1937	MPC
1555 Dejan	15 September 1941	MPC
3280 Gretry	17 September 1933	MPC
4908 Ward	17 September 1933	MPC
7000 Curie	6 November 1939	MPC
19911 Rigaux	26 March 1933	MPC

Fernand Rigaux (1905 – 21 September 1962) was a Belgian astronomer and observer of variable stars, minor planets and comets at the Royal Observatory at Uccle, Belgium.

In 1951, he co-discovered the periodic comet 49P/Arend-Rigaux with his colleague Sylvain Arend. He is also credited by the Minor Planet Center with the discovery of 8 asteroids between 1933 and 1941.

The asteroid 19911 Rigaux, discovered by himself at Uccle in 1933, was named in his memory. Naming citation was published on 25 December 2015 (M.P.C. 97568).
