= Zoran Ivanović (sculptor) =

Serbian sculptor

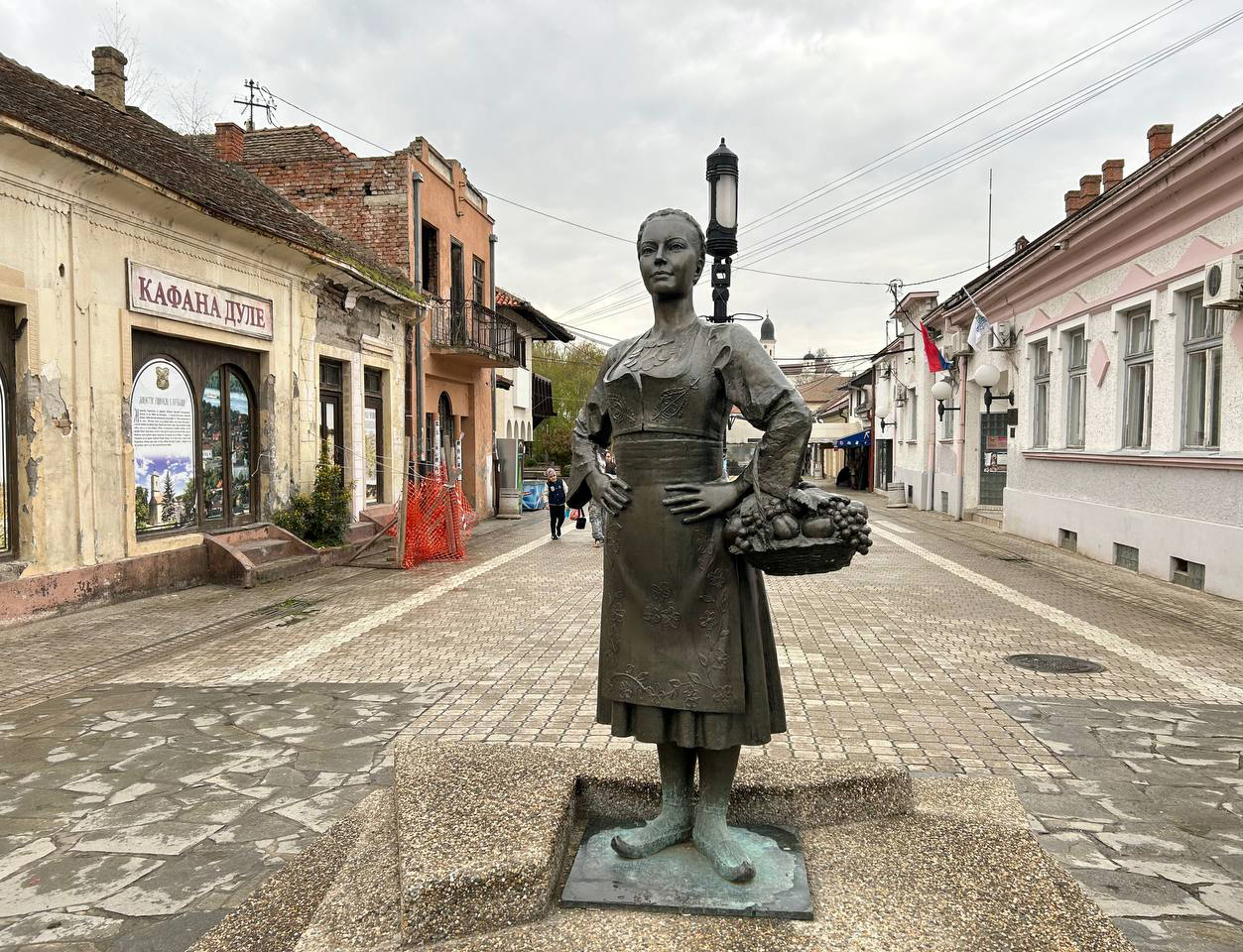
Gročanka

Zoran Ivanović (Serbian: Зоран Ивановић; born 1967) is a Serbian sculptor and a professor at the Serbian Academy of Applied Arts. He is the creator of numerous monuments in Serbia and Europe.
