= Belgrade Observatory =

Astronomical observatory in Belgrade, Serbia

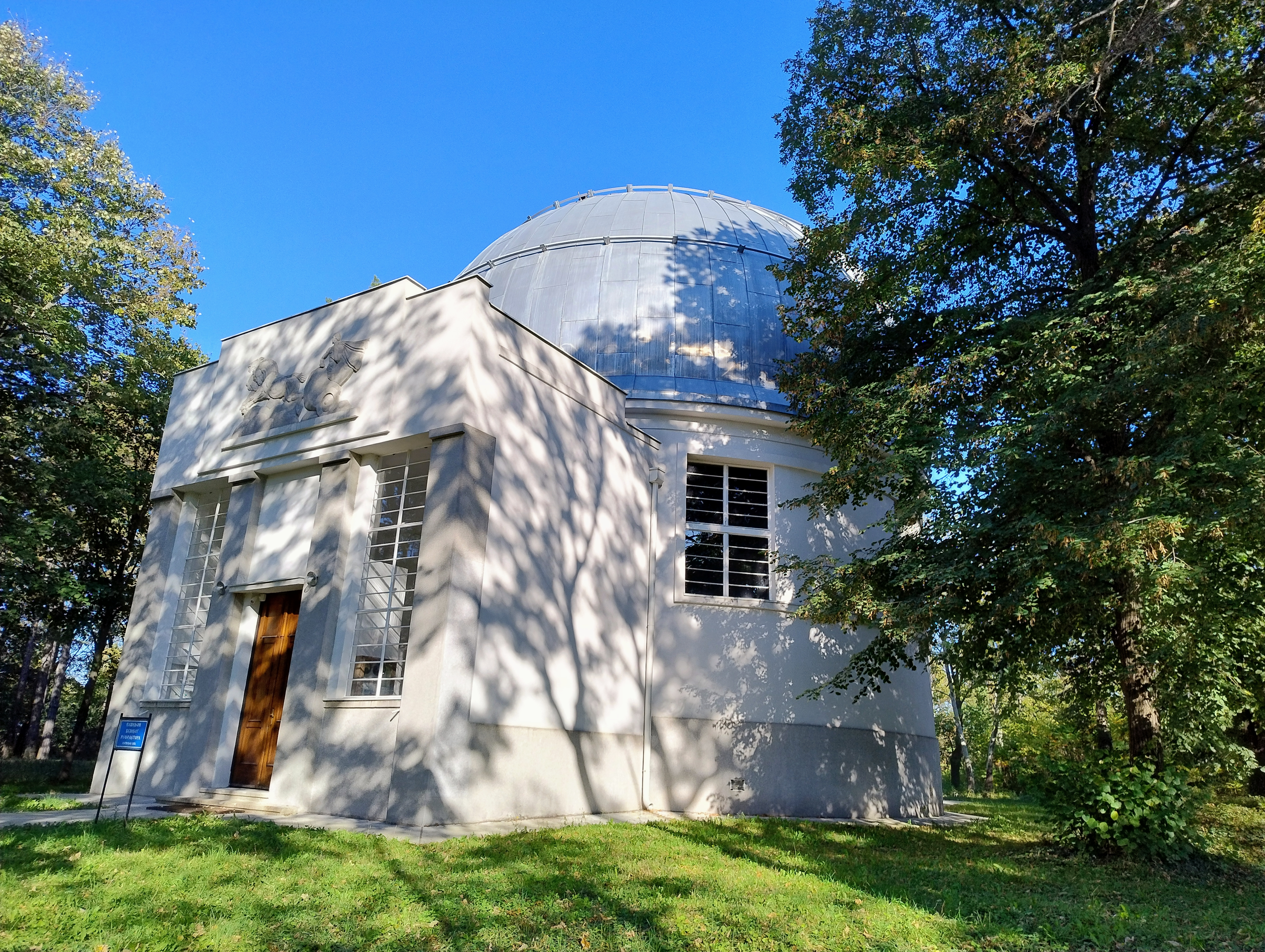
- Pavilion of Large Refractor
- Observatory code: 057
- Location: Belgrade, Serbia
- Coordinates: 44°48′13″N 20°30′29″E
- Altitude: 253 m (830 ft)
- Established: 1887
- Website: www.aob.rs
- Location of Belgrade Observatory
- Related media on Commons

The Belgrade Observatory is an astronomical observatory located in the Zvezdara Forest in the eastern part of Belgrade, Serbia.

== History ==
=== Origin (1887–1891) ===
In 1879, Milan Nedeljković (1857–1950) received a scholarship to continue his education in Paris at the Sorbonne. He studied mathematics and at the College de France extraordinary studying physics. In Paris Observatory was formed the first School of Astronomy, which Nedeljkovic successfully completed. During the study he also finished courses in meteorology, precision mechanics and seismology. After five years of study in Paris, he returned in 1884 in Belgrade where he became a professor of astronomy and meteorology at the Grand School (University of Belgrade). At the same time launching a campaign for the establishment of observatory at Grand School, but was rejected because of financial circumstances. Finally, after three long years, the decree of the founding of the Observatory was signed on 7 April [O.S. 26 March] 1887 by the Minister of Education and Church Affaires of Kingdom of Serbia Milan Kujundžić Aberdar on the initiative of professor Nedeljković.

Nedeljković was appointed first director of the newly founded Observatory. On 1 July 1887 Nedeljković started his activity at the provisory astronomical and meteorological observatory which was located in the rented house of the Gajzler family at 66 Svetozara Markovića Street. Located at the crossroads of the Vojvode Milenka and Svetozara Markovića streets in the historical neighborhood of Vračar (though today administratively in the municipality of Savski Venac), the house still stands today. Adopting the justified request of Prof. Nedeljković, a new Minister of Education, Dr Vladan Đorđević passed on 27 September 1888 the Regulation on the establishment of unified network of meteorological stations in the whole country. Then Observatory become Central meteorological station for data collection.

=== Vračar (1891–1929) ===
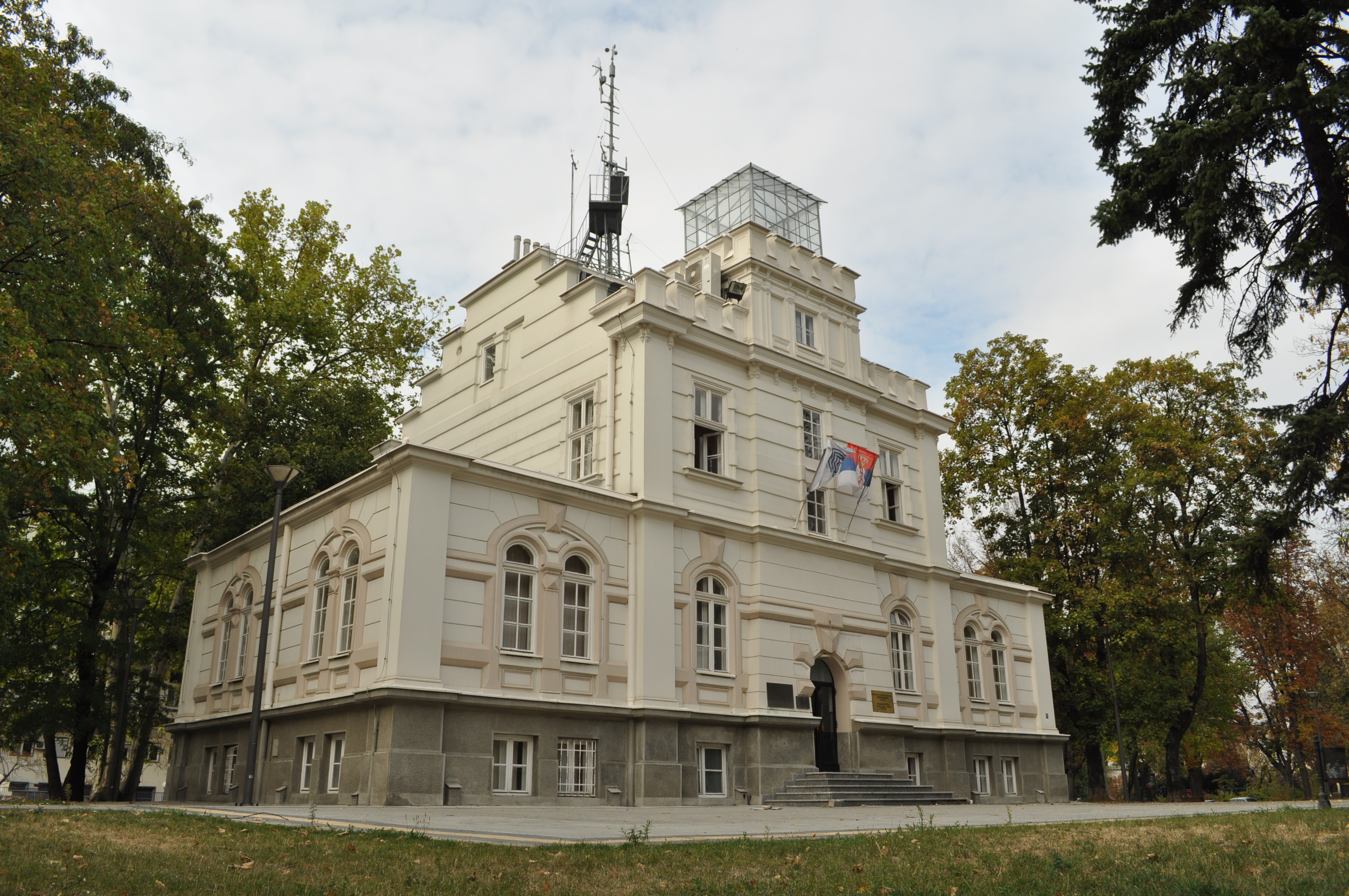
Astronomical and meteorological observatory from 1891 to 1924

Observatory was operating in the Gajzler house until 1 May 1891, when it was moved into its own building. specifically constructed for that purpose at 8 Bulevar Oslobođenja. It was constructed according to the design of architect Dimitrije T. Leko and equipped with the modern small instruments for astronomical and meteorological observations. Also, then are made in funcion two small astronomical pavilion. The Observatory was a "workshop" for practical training for the students of the Grand School and People's Observatory (on an artificial hill were located Bardu field glasses) where the most frequent guests were students, citizens and prominent persons – for example, in 1910, Halley's Comet was observed. Apart from its importance for astronomy and meteorology, the newly built Observatory, headed by Nedeljković, was a cradle of the seismic and geomagnetic researches in Serbia. Thanks to Nedeljković's colleague and friend Miklós Konkoly, the founder of modern Hungarian astronomy and meteorology, the observatory was equipped with a seismograph. Meanwhile, for a short time, from July 1899 to October 1900, as second person on the head of Observatory was Đorđe Stanojević (1858–1921). New observatory building was located close to the previous, across the Vračar plateau. In the 1950s a park was planted around it which in 2010 was named Park Milutin Milanković.

During the withdrawal from Belgrade at the end of the World War I in 1918, the Austro-Hungarian army destroyed all the instruments in the observatory.

Nedeljković remains one of the most important figures in the history of Serbian astronomy. He managed to acquire instruments for the new observatory from the war reparations from Germany, not spending the state money. The total value of the instruments he obtained was three times higher than the entire cost of the construction of the new observatory building. Instruments arrived in 1922.

In 1924, by ruling of the Faculty Council the Observatory was divided into two separate institutions: Astronomical Observatory and Meteorological Observatory of Belgrade University. Vojislav Mišković (1892–1976), at the time already a well established astronomer engaged at Nice Observatory, France was appointed as the head of the Astronomical Observatory in 1926.

=== Zvezdara from 1929 ===
Citing Yugoslavia's need for such a facility, which countries such as the Soviet Union and the United Kingdom already possessed, specifically naming the Pulkovo and Greenwich Observatories, in 1929 Mišković succeeded in getting funds for the constructions of a new modern observatory, 6 km (3.7 mi) southeast from the city centre, occupying a 4.5 ha (11 acres) area at 253 m (830 ft) high hill on Veliki Vračar. On 7 October 1929 Mišković was granted 10 million dinars ($176.520). An uninhabited area was chosen specifically for being high and, at the time, far from downtown Belgrade. Due to his diligence in acquiring the new building, Mišković is named as the "builder of the observatory".

It was projected and built between 1930 and 1932, and designed by Czechoslovak architect Jan Dubovy (1892–1969). It was complex with the Administrative building and pavilions with astronomic equipment. The Observatory was designed in modernist style, one of the first such buildings in Belgrade, with elements of academic historicism, characteristic of the inter-war period. Dubovy also designed the furniture for the facility and today is especially praised his design of the astronomical library. The greatest and best equipped of its kind in Yugoslavia, it holds over 100,000 copies of astronomical magazines and over 5,000 books. Rarities include Ruđer Bošković’s Elements of general mathematics, printed in Rome in 1757 and Zaharije Orfelin’s Eternal calendar printed in Vienna in 1783. Shaped in the form of semi-circle, it was designed after the libraries of the University of Oxford. By 1934 the instruments were installed and in addition to the Administrative building were erected Pavilion of the Small Meridian Circle, Pavilion of Large Refractor ″Carl Zeiss″ 650/10550 mm, Pavilion of Small Refractor, Pavilion of Astrograph Zeiss 160/800 mm, tower – building with water tank, building with a mechanic and carpenter's workshop. The area of the complex covered 4.5 ha (11 acres).

Later, the pavilions for the researchers and their families were built in the vicinity. Because of the observatory, at the time called zvezdarnica in Serbian, the entire area previously known as Veliki Vračar, became known as Zvezdara, both the modern neighborhood and the municipality of Belgrade.

=== World War II ===
During World War II, section of the Observatory's administrative building was turned into the canteen for the German officers. Germans devised a plan to dismantle all of the equipment and take it to Germany, but due to the engagement of director Mišković, that was prevented. Nevertheless, the facility was looted by the German soldiers.

=== After 1945 ===
From the end of 1957 until the end of 1959, three new observation pavilions were built – Pavilion of Large Vertical Circle Askania 190/2578 mm, Pavilion of Large Transit Instrument Askania 190/2578 mm and Pavilion of Large Meridian Circle Askania 190/2578 mm. Observatory is organization with more about 52 employees, of which 39 are researchers. The complex was enlarged to 10.5 ha (26 acres).

In 2001 the state placed the building of the observatory under protection, declaring it a cultural monument.

As of 2017, the Large Refractor is still operational, so as the dome above it, but it can't be used for further scientific research due to the heavy light pollution in Belgrade.

== Mount Vidojevica ==
Construction of the new Astronomical Station of the Belgrade Observatory infrastructure began at the summit of Mount Vidojevica (elevation 1,155 metres (3,789 ft)) in southern Serbia. The 60 cm (24 in) Cassegrain telescope was installed at Station in spring of 2011. The new telescope is named “Nedeljković”, after Milan Nedeljković, the first director and founder of the Observatory. In the next phase, in spring 2016, a 1.4 m (4 ft 7 in) fully robotic telescope was installed at Astronomical Station of Vidojevica. It has been named “Milanković”, after Milutin Milanković, a geophysicist, civil engineer and astronomer who was the director of the Observatory from 1948 to 1951. Telescope “Milanković” will be part of the Worldwide Network of Robotic Telescopes.

== Directors ==
- Milan Nedeljković (1887–1899)
- Đorđe Stanojević (1899–1900)
- Milan Nedeljković (1900–1915)
- Victor Conrad (1916–1918)
- Milan Nedeljković (1919–1924)
- Milutin Milanković (1925–1926)
- Vojislav Mišković (1926–1946)
- Milorad B. Protić (1946–1948)
- Milutin Milanković (1948–1951)
- Vojislav Mišković (1951–1954)
- Milorad B. Protić (1954–1961)
- Vasilije Oskanjan (1961–1965)
- Petar Đurković (1965–1970)
- Milorad B. Protić (1971–1975)
- M. Mijatov (1975–1981)
- Miodrag Mitrović (1982–1989)
- Ištvan Vince (1990–1994)
- Milan Dimitrijević (1994–2001)
- Zoran Knežević (2002–2014)
- Gojko Ðurašević (2015–present)

== See also ==
- List of observatory codes
