= Comas Sola =

"Comas Sola" may refer to:

== Astronomy ==
- Asteroid 1655 Comas Solà
- Josep Comas i Solà (1868-1937), Spanish astronomer
- Comet 32P/Comas Solà
- Crater Comas Sola (crater)

== Music ==
- "Fly and Collision of Comas Sola", a song by Tangerine Dream from the album Alpha Centauri
