= Castellet de Banyoles =

Archaeological site in Tivissa, Spain

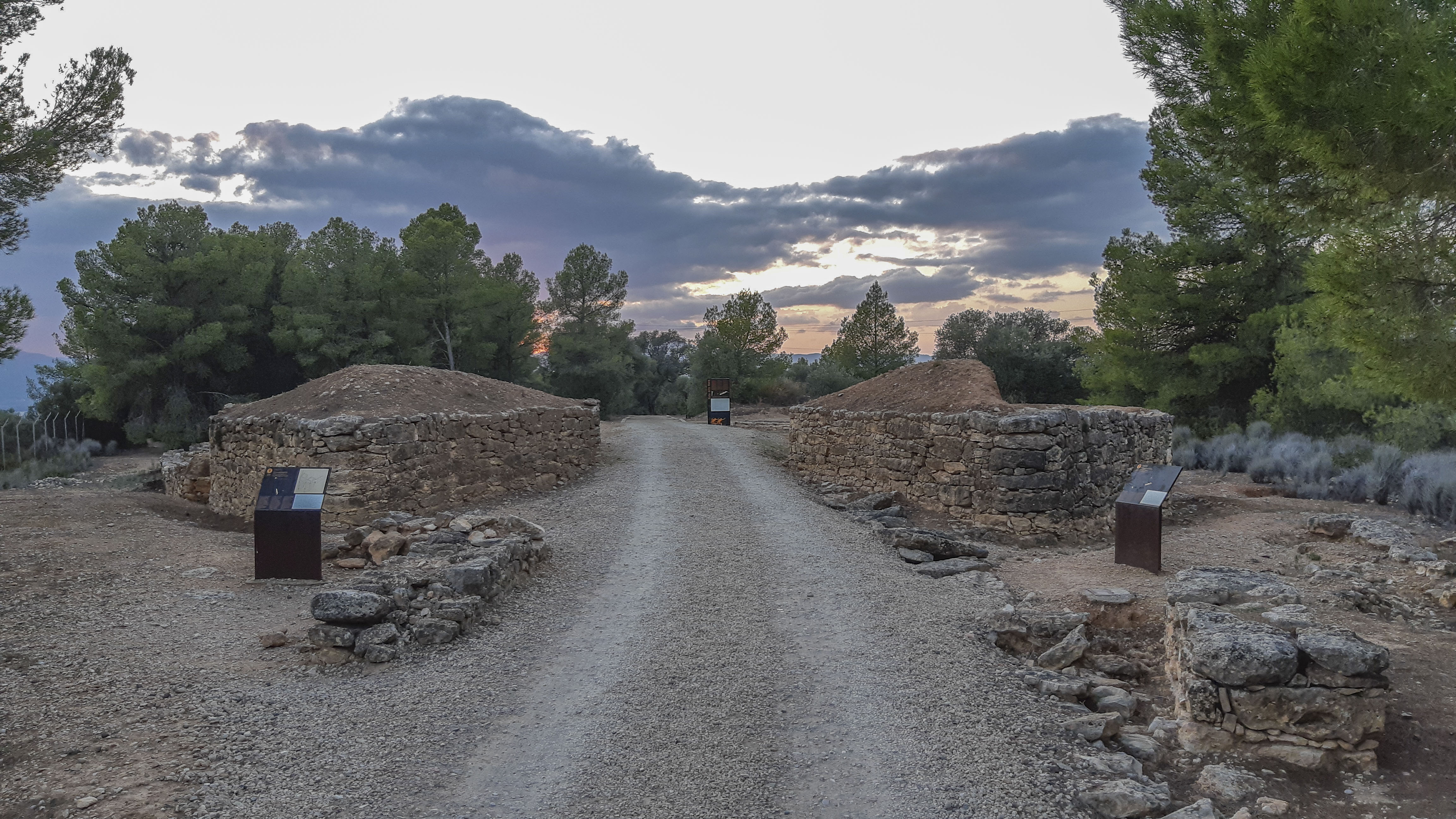
- Main entrance to the city

- Location within Catalonia
- Interactive map of Castellet de Banyoles
- 41°03′41″N 0°40′05″E
- Type: Settlement
- Cultures: Iberians
- Associated with: Ilercavoni
- Location: Tivissa, Province of Tarragona, Catalonia, Spain

History
- Built: 3rd century BC
- Abandoned: c. 195 BC

Site notes
- Length: 300 m (980 ft)
- Width: 235 m (771 ft)
- Area: 4–5 ha (9.9–12.4 acres)
- Public access: Opened to public
- Website: Ruta dels Ibers

Spanish Cultural Heritage
- Official name: Poblado Ibérico del Castellet de Banyoles
- Designated: 27 October 1978
- Reference no.: RI-55-0000088

The Castellet de Banyoles is an ancient Iberian city and archaeological site dating from the 3rd century BC, located in the modern town of Tivissa, near the River Ebro in the Ribera d'Ebre region of Catalonia. The site is mainly known for its pentagonal towers flanking the entrance, unique among the protohistoric fortifications of the Iberian Peninsula and the treasure that was found in 1927, composed of a set of silver and gold decorated vessels. Built around the first half of the 4th century BC, its life came quickly to an end in a generalised destruction, produced by a Roman siege, possibly during the Revolts of Indibil and Mandonius (206-205 BC) or, most likely, during the Campaign of Cato the Elder (195 BC). Evidences of the Roman camp have been identified outside the walled enclosure.

Another Spanish Property of Cultural Interest with the same name is located in the site, composed by the ruins of a medieval castle facing the left margin of the river.

== Etymology ==
The name "Castellet de Banyoles" ("Banyoles' Little Castle") comes from the 12th century castle built in the south-western corner of the site. A document from 1153 cites the place as "caput de Bannoles" (head/bulge of Banyoles). Banyoles is thought to derive from a Latin term meaning "baths"; in this case, referring to the surrounding wetlands, although it could as well derive from an anthroponym.

== Geography ==
The site is located about 7 km (4.3 mi) from the modern town of Tivissa, in a plain headland facing the left side of the Ebro river, in an altitude of 172 m (564 ft) above sea level. The shape of the headland is that of an isosceles triangle, with the shortest side facing the river and the closest angle being the entrance of the city. The site is surrounded by steep cliffs that make it impossible to access from anywhere but the narrow funnel entrance. Facing the walled city, stood around 7,000 ha (17,000 acres) of arable land.
