= 1188 Gothlandia =

Stony Florian asteroid

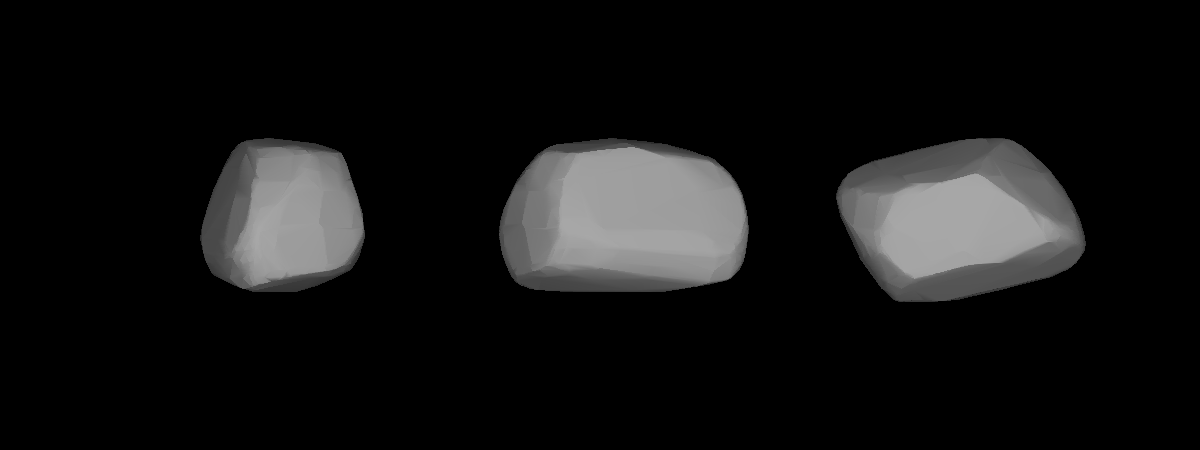
- Lightcurve-based 3D-model of Gothlandia

Discovery
- Discovered by: J. Comas Solà
- Discovery site: Fabra Obs.
- Discovery date: 30 September 1930

Designations
- Pronunciation: /ɡɒθˈlændiə/
- Named after: Catalonia (Spanish autonomous community)
- Alternative designations: 1930 SB · 2016 FU_{5} A917 SK
- Minor planet category: main-belt · (inner); Flora

Orbital characteristics
- Epoch 4 September 2017 (JD 2458000.5)
- Uncertainty parameter 0
- Observation arc: 86.62 yr (31,639 days)
- Aphelion: 2.5856 AU
- Perihelion: 1.7948 AU
- Semi-major axis: 2.1902 AU
- Eccentricity: 0.1805
- Orbital period (sidereal): 3.24 yr (1,184 days)
- Mean anomaly: 294.72°
- Mean motion: 0° 18^{m} 14.76^{s} / day
- Inclination: 4.8169°
- Longitude of ascending node: 5.4502°
- Argument of perihelion: 7.1662°

Physical characteristics
- Dimensions: 11.19±2.21 km 12.11±0.76 km 12.40±0.6 km 12.42±0.6 km 12.46 km (derived); 12.670±0.136 km 14.255±0.040 km
- Synodic rotation period: 3.49138±0.00006 h 3.4915±0.0001 h 3.49153±0.00002 h 3.4916 h 3.4917±0.0005 h 3.491820±0.00005 h 3.491820 h 3.49198±0.00014 h 3.4921±0.0001 h 3.493 h
- Geometric albedo: 0.2065±0.0170; 0.2401±0.025; 0.2476±0.0242; 0.252±0.034; 0.2631 (derived); 0.273±0.031; 0.41±0.18
- Spectral type: SMASS = S
- Absolute magnitude (H): 11.34±0.27 · 11.50 · 11.59 · 11.6 · 11.662±0.014 · 11.70

1188 Gothlandia, provisional designation 1930 SB, is a stony Florian asteroid from the inner regions of the asteroid belt, approximately 12 kilometers in diameter. Discovered by astronomer Josep Comas i Solà at the Fabra Observatory in 1930, the asteroid was later named after the ancient name of the Spanish autonomous community of Catalonia.

== Discovery ==
Gothlandia was discovered on 30 September 1930, by Catalan astronomer Josep Comas i Solà at the Fabra Observatory in Barcelona, Spain. It was independently discovered by Soviet Grigory Neujmin at Simeiz Observatory on 17 October 1930, and by K. Nakamura at Kyoto Observatory, Japan, on 18 October 1930. The Minor Planet Center, however, only credits the first discoverer. The asteroid was first identified as A917 SK at Simeiz in September 1917.

== Orbit and classification ==
Gothlandia is a member of the Flora family (402), a giant asteroid family and the largest family of stony asteroids in the main-belt. It orbits the Sun in the inner main-belt at a distance of 1.8–2.6 AU once every 3 years and 3 months (1,184 days). Its orbit has an eccentricity of 0.18 and an inclination of 5° with respect to the ecliptic. The body's observation arc begins with its official discovery observation at Barcelona in 1930.

== Physical characteristics ==
In the SMASS classification, Gothlandia is a stony S-type asteroid, which corresponds to the overall spectral type for Florian asteroids.

=== Rotation period and poles ===
Several rotational lightcurves of Gothlandia have been obtained from photometric observations since the 1990s. Lightcurve analysis gave a consolidated rotation period of 3.4916 hours with a brightness variation of 0.81 magnitude (U=3). A high brightness amplitude typically indicates a non-spherical shape.

Modeled lightcurves using data from the Uppsala Asteroid Photometric Catalogue (UAPC) and other sources gave a concurring period 3.491820 hours. In 2013, another modeled lightcurve obtained form photometric data collected by the Catalina Sky Survey also determined a spin axis of (334.0°, −84.0°) in ecliptic coordinates (λ, β).

=== Diameter and albedo ===
According to the surveys carried out by the Infrared Astronomical Satellite IRAS, the Japanese Akari satellite and the NEOWISE mission of NASA's Wide-field Infrared Survey Explorer, Gothlandia measures between 11.19 and 14.255 kilometers in diameter and its surface has an albedo between 0.2065 and 0.41.

The Collaborative Asteroid Lightcurve Link derives an albedo of 0.2631 and a diameter of 12.46 kilometers based on an absolute magnitude of 11.59.

== Naming ==
This minor planet was named after the Spanish autonomous community of Catalonia, by its ancient, per-medieval name Gothlandia ("Land of the Goths"). The official naming citation was mentioned in The Names of the Minor Planets by Paul Herget in 1955 (H 110).
