= 925 Alphonsina =

Asteroid

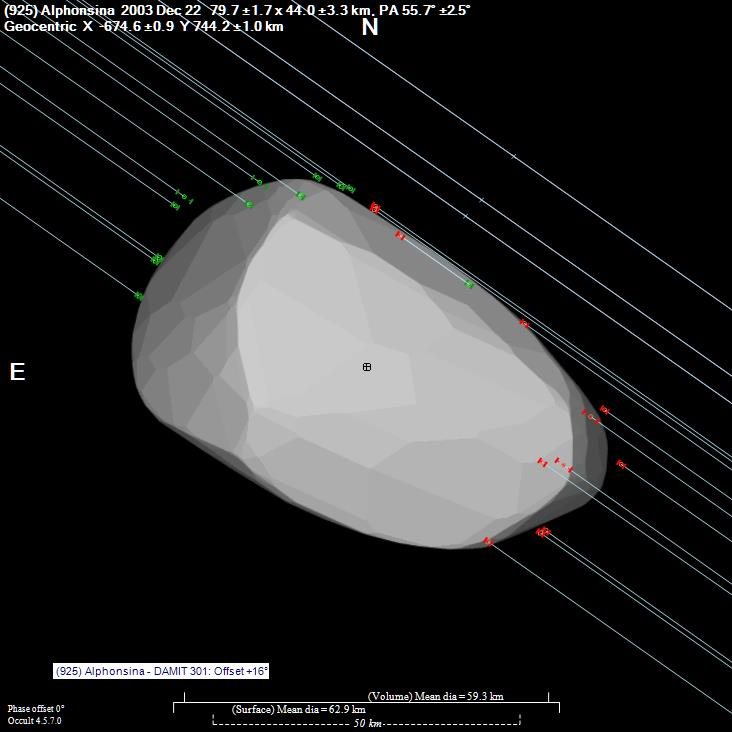
- Combined Plot - Light Curve Inversion model (DAMIT 301) and Multi-chord Occultation.

Discovery
- Discovered by: J. Comas Solà
- Discovery site: Fabra Obs.
- Discovery date: 13 January 1920

Designations
- Pronunciation: /ælfɒnˈsaɪnə/
- Named after: Alfonso X and Alfonso XIII (Kings of Castile and Spain)
- Alternative designations: 1920 GM · A902 ED
- Minor planet category: main-belt · (middle); Hansa

Orbital characteristics
- Epoch 23 March 2018 (JD 2458200.5)
- Uncertainty parameter 0
- Observation arc: 115.98 yr (42,362 d)
- Aphelion: 2.9130 AU
- Perihelion: 2.4881 AU
- Semi-major axis: 2.7006 AU
- Eccentricity: 0.0787
- Orbital period (sidereal): 4.44 yr (1,621 d)
- Mean anomaly: 24.261°
- Mean motion: 0° 13^{m} 19.56^{s} / day
- Inclination: 21.077°
- Longitude of ascending node: 299.59°
- Argument of perihelion: 201.60°

Physical characteristics
- Mean diameter: 58±16 km
- Synodic rotation period: 7.876 h 7.87754±0.00005 h 7.8780±0.0004 h 7.879±0.001 h 7.880±0.001 h 7.883±0.002 h (Note: Hamanowa (2011) web: rotation period 7.883±0.002 hours with a brightness amplitude of 0.30 mag. Summary figures for (925) Alphonsina at the LCDB.); 7.92 h (Note: Hanslmeier (1980): rotation period for (925) Alphonsina of 7.92 hours with a brightness amplitude of 0.18 mag. Quality Code of 2. Summary figures at the LCDB.)
- Pole ecliptic longitude: 294°
- Pole ecliptic latitude: 41°
- Geometric albedo: 0.204±0.069; 0.214±0.006; 0.218; 0.2266; 0.248±0.036; 0.25±0.05; 0.2533±0.0534; 0.2786±0.038
- Spectral type: Tholen = S SMASS = S · S B–V = 0.850; U–B = 0.454
- Absolute magnitude (H): 8.33; 8.41

925 Alphonsina, provisional designation 1920 GM, is a stony Hansian asteroid from the central region of the asteroid belt, approximately 58 kilometers (36 miles) in diameter. It was discovered on 13 January 1920, by Catalan astronomer Josep Comas i Solà at the Fabra Observatory in Barcelona, Spain. The S-type asteroid has a rotation period of 7.88 hours. It was named for the Spanish Kings Alfonso X and Alfonso XIII.

== Orbit and classification ==
Together with asteroid 480 Hansa, Alphonsina is the largest member of the stony Hansa family (803), a high-inclination family with more than a thousand known members.

It orbits the Sun in the intermediate asteroid belt at a distance of 2.5–2.9 AU once every 4 years and 5 months (1,621 days; semi-major axis of 2.7 AU). Its orbit has an eccentricity of 0.08 and an inclination of 21° with respect to the ecliptic. The asteroid was first observed as A902 ED at Heidelberg Observatory in March 1902. The body's observation arc begins ten days after its official discovery observation at Heidelberg.

== Physical characteristics ==
Alphonsina is a common, stony S-type asteroid in both the Tholen and SMASS classification. Polarimetric observations in 2017 also characterized it as an S-type asteroid.

=== Rotation period and pole ===
Since 1980, several rotational lightcurves of Alphonsina have been obtained from photometric observations with rotation periods between 7.876 and 7.92 hours (U=3/3/3/2/2). The best-rated lightcurve by Alan Harris and James Whitney Young gave a period of 7.880 hours. The consolidated brightness amplitude is between 0.11 and 0.57 magnitude.

In 2011, two modeled lightcurves using data from the Uppsala Asteroid Photometric Catalogue (UAPC) and from asteroidal occultation silhouettes gave a concurring period 7.87754 hours. The studies also determined a spin axis at (296.0°, 41.0°) and (294.0°, 41.0°) in ecliptic coordinates (λ, β), respectively.

=== Diameter and albedo ===
According to the surveys carried out by the Infrared Astronomical Satellite IRAS, the Japanese Akari satellite and the NEOWISE mission of NASA's Wide-field Infrared Survey Explorer, Alphonsina measures between 54.34 and 63.52 kilometers in diameter and its surface has an albedo between 0.204 and 0.2786.

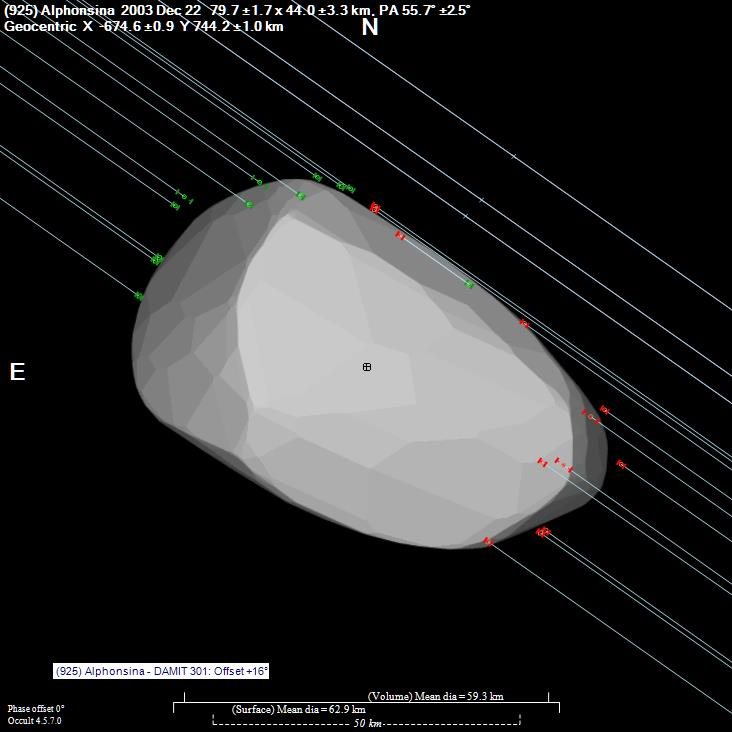
Combined Plot - Light Curve Inversion model (DAMIT 301) and Multi-chord Occultation.

In 2003, stellar occultation measured a diameter of 59.2 kilometres and deduced an albedo of 0.218, while the modelling of asteroid occultation silhouettes gave a diameter of 58 kilometres. The asteroid has been observed in stellar occultations 8 times since 2003.

The Collaborative Asteroid Lightcurve Link adopts Petr Pravec's revised WISE data, that is, an albedo of 0.2266 and a diameter of 58.06 kilometers based on an absolute magnitude of 8.41.

== Naming ==
This minor planet was named in honor of the Iberian Kings, Alfonso X (1221–1284) and Alfonso XIII (1886–1941), King of Castile and Spain, respectively. The original citation from 1920, mentions, that the 13th century king inspired the field of astronomy in the Middle Ages, and, that the latter king was a great enthusiast of the scientific development in Spain. It also mentions that the King of Spain approved the naming of the asteroid (AN 211, 223).
