= 1708 Pólit =

Very dark asteroid

Discovery
- Discovered by: J. Comas Solà
- Discovery site: Fabra Obs.
- Discovery date: 30 November 1929

Designations
- Named after: Isidre Pòlit (Catalan astronomer)
- Alternative designations: 1929 XA · 1934 XF; 1939 YB
- Minor planet category: main-belt · (outer)

Orbital characteristics
- Epoch 4 September 2017 (JD 2458000.5)
- Uncertainty parameter 0
- Observation arc: 87.51 yr (31,964 days)
- Aphelion: 3.8064 AU
- Perihelion: 2.0159 AU
- Semi-major axis: 2.9111 AU
- Eccentricity: 0.3075
- Orbital period (sidereal): 4.97 yr (1,814 days)
- Mean anomaly: 213.43°
- Mean motion: 0° 11^{m} 54.24^{s} / day
- Inclination: 6.0445°
- Longitude of ascending node: 192.21°
- Argument of perihelion: 248.96°

Physical characteristics
- Dimensions: 27.46±1.30 km 28.06±6.19 km 28.706±0.057 km 29.30±1.7 km 30.282±0.071 km 33.44±1.53 km
- Synodic rotation period: 7.5080±0.0002 h 7.5085±0.001 h 7.520±0.002 h
- Geometric albedo: 0.035±0.004; 0.0350±0.0055; 0.0392±0.005; 0.04±0.01; 0.042±0.008
- Spectral type: C
- Absolute magnitude (H): 11.70 · 11.8 · 11.86

1708 Pólit, provisional designation 1929 XA, is a very dark asteroid from the outer region of the asteroid belt, approximately 29 kilometers in diameter. It was discovered on 30 November 1929, by Spanish astronomer of Catalan origin Josep Comas i Solà at the Fabra Observatory in Barcelona, and was later named after Catalan astronomer Isidre Pòlit i Boixareu.

== Orbit and classification ==
Pólit orbits the Sun in the outer main-belt at a distance of 2.0–3.8 AU once every 4 years and 12 months (1,814 days). Its orbit has an eccentricity of 0.31 and an inclination of 6° with respect to the ecliptic. A first precovery was taken at Lowell Observatory in Flagstaff, extending the body's observation arc by 3 days prior to its official discovery observation.

== Physical characteristics ==
The asteroid has been characterized as a C-type asteroid.

=== Diameter and albedo ===
According to the surveys carried out by the Infrared Astronomical Satellite IRAS, the Japanese Akari satellite, and NASA's Wide-field Infrared Survey Explorer with its subsequent NEOWISE mission, Pólit measures between 27.46 and 33.44 kilometers in diameter and its surface has a low albedo between 0.035 and 0.042.

The Collaborative Asteroid Lightcurve Link agrees with the results obtained by IRAS, that is, an albedo of 0.0392 and a diameter of 29.30 kilometers based on an absolute magnitude of 11.8.

=== Lightcurves ===
Between 2005 and 2014, a large number of rotational lightcurves of Pólit were obtained from photometric observations by American astronomer Maurice Clark at the Preston Gott and McDonald Observatories. Lightcurve analysis gave a rotation period of 7.5080 to 7.5085 hours with a brightness variation between 0.40 and 0.50 magnitude (U=3/3-). Clark also derived a spin axis of (2.1°, 47.5°) in ecliptic coordinates (λ, β) (Q=2).

In addition, astronomer Raymond Poncy measured a period of 7.520 hours with an amplitude of 0.30 magnitude (U=3).

== Naming ==
This minor planet was named in memory of the Fabra Observatory's second director of the astronomical section, Isidre Pòlit i Boixareu (1880–1958), who was an assiduous observer of minor planets and comets. The official naming citation was published by the Minor Planet Center on 1 June 1980 (M.P.C. 5357).
