= 1102 Pepita =

Stony background asteroid

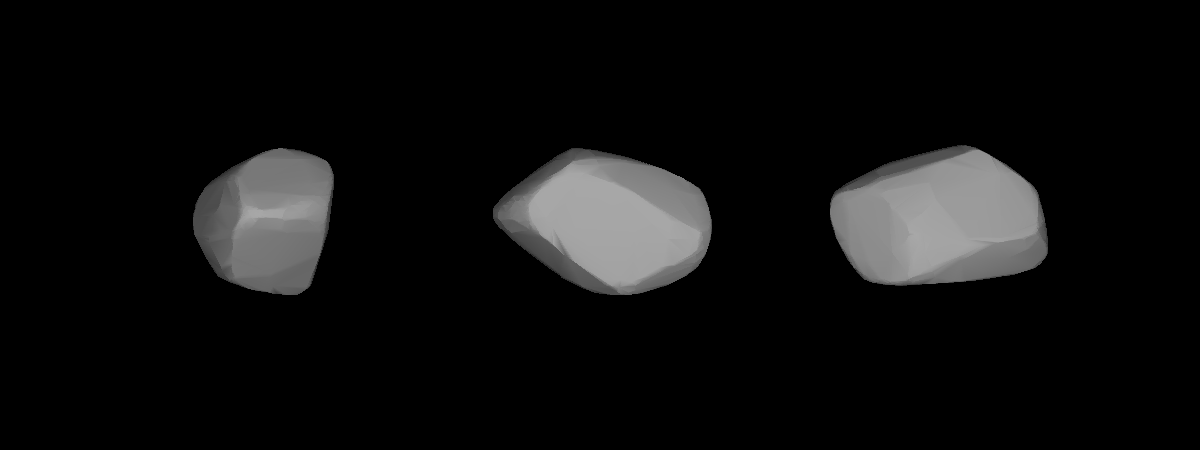
- Lightcurve-based 3D-model of Pepita

Discovery
- Discovered by: J. Comas Solà
- Discovery site: Fabra Obs.
- Discovery date: 5 November 1928

Designations
- Named after: Josep Comas i Solà (discoverer himself)
- Alternative designations: 1928 VA · 1960 WQ; A899 KB
- Minor planet category: main-belt · (outer) background

Orbital characteristics
- Epoch 4 September 2017 (JD 2458000.5)
- Uncertainty parameter 0
- Observation arc: 86.24 yr (31,499 days)
- Aphelion: 3.4119 AU
- Perihelion: 2.7311 AU
- Semi-major axis: 3.0715 AU
- Eccentricity: 0.1108
- Orbital period (sidereal): 5.38 yr (1,966 days)
- Mean anomaly: 267.80°
- Mean motion: 0° 10^{m} 59.16^{s} / day
- Inclination: 15.828°
- Longitude of ascending node: 216.59°
- Argument of perihelion: 116.55°

Physical characteristics
- Mean diameter: 30.88±1.59 km 36.632±0.378 km 39.27±2.1 km 41.02±0.74 km 41.733±0.308 km
- Synodic rotation period: 5.1±0.1 h 5.1040±0.0003 h 5.10532±0.00005 h 5.1054±0.0002 h
- Geometric albedo: 0.1842±0.0220; 0.188±0.007; 0.1991±0.023; 0.229±0.054; 0.322±0.058
- Spectral type: Tholen = C SMASS = S B–V = 0.724; U–B = 0.424
- Absolute magnitude (H): 8.68±0.65; 9.40

1102 Pepita, provisional designation 1928 VA, is a stony background asteroid from the outer regions of the asteroid belt, approximately 39 kilometers in diameter. It was discovered on 5 November 1928, by Catalan astronomer Josep Comas i Solà at the Fabra Observatory in Barcelona, Spain. It was named after the discoverer by the feminine form of his nickname. The asteroid has a rotation period of 5.1 hours.

== Orbit and classification ==
Pepita is a non-family asteroid from the main belt's background population. It orbits the Sun in the outer asteroid belt at a distance of 2.7–3.4 AU once every 5 years and 5 months (1,966 days; semi-major axis of 3.07 AU). Its orbit has an eccentricity of 0.11 and an inclination of 16° with respect to the ecliptic.

In May 1899, the asteroid was first observed as A899 KB at Harvard's Boyden Station in Arequipa, Peru (800). The body's observation arc begins with its official discovery observation at Barcelona.

== Physical characteristics ==
In the SMASS classification, Pepita is a stony S-type asteroid, which agrees with the body's measured geometric albedo (see below). Conversely, it is also classified as a carbonaceous C-type asteroid by Tholen.

=== Rotation period and poles ===
Three rotational lightcurves of Pepita were obtained from photometric observations by astronomers Hilari Pallares and Enric Forné (2006, U=2), Pierre Antonini and René Roy (2007, U=3), as well as by Robert Stephens (2007, U=3). The consolidated lightcurve gave a well-defined rotation period of 5.1054 hours with a brightness amplitude between 0.31 and 0.36 magnitude.

In 2011, a modeled lightcurve using data from the Uppsala Asteroid Photometric Catalogue and other sources gave a concurring sidereal period 5.10532 hours, as well as two spin axes of (25.0°, −34.0°) and (231.0°, −30.0°) in ecliptic coordinates (λ, β).

=== Diameter and albedo ===
According to the surveys carried out by the Infrared Astronomical Satellite IRAS, the Japanese Akari satellite and the NEOWISE mission of NASA's Wide-field Infrared Survey Explorer, Pepita measures between 30.88 and 41.733 kilometers in diameter and its surface has an albedo between 0.1842 and 0.322.

The Collaborative Asteroid Lightcurve Link adopts the results obtained by IRAS, that is, an albedo of 0.1991 and a diameter of 39.27 kilometers based on an absolute magnitude of 9.40.

== Naming ==
This minor planet was named after the discoverer, Josep Comas i Solà (1868–1937), by the feminine form of his nickname, "Pepito". He was the first director of the discovering Fabra Observatory and founded the Astronomical Society of Spain and America (Spanish: Sociedad Astronomica de España y América, SADEYA).

The official naming citation was mentioned in The Names of the Minor Planets by Paul Herget in 1955 (H 104). The asteroid 1655 Comas Solà is also named after him, as is the Martian crater Comas Sola.
