= 986 Amelia =

Large background asteroid

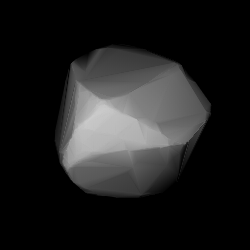
- Modelled shape of Amelia from its lightcurve

Discovery
- Discovered by: J. Comas Solà
- Discovery site: Fabra Obs.
- Discovery date: 19 October 1922

Designations
- Named after: Amelia Solà (discoverer's wife)
- Alternative designations: A922 UA · 1922 MQ; 1935 BK · 1966 VA; A915 JC
- Minor planet category: main-belt · (outer) background

Orbital characteristics
- Epoch 31 May 2020 (JD 2459000.5)
- Uncertainty parameter 0
- Observation arc: 93.64 yr (34,203 d)
- Aphelion: 3.7674 AU
- Perihelion: 2.4961 AU
- Semi-major axis: 3.1317 AU
- Eccentricity: 0.2030
- Orbital period (sidereal): 5.54 yr (2,024 d)
- Mean anomaly: 210.80°
- Mean motion: 0° 10^{m} 40.08^{s} / day
- Inclination: 14.815°
- Longitude of ascending node: 92.601°
- Argument of perihelion: 265.52°

Physical characteristics
- Mean diameter: 48.677±0.159 km; 50.94±1.2 km; 52.30±0.78 km
- Synodic rotation period: 9.52±0.01 h (Note: Lightcurve plot of (986) Amelia by Robert A. Koff (Oct 2000). Rotation period 9.52 hours with a brightness amplitude of 0.43 mag. LCDB quality code of 3. Summary figures and more information at Bob Koff's website and at the LCDB.)
- Pole ecliptic latitude: (80.0°, 30.0°) (λ_{1}/β_{1}); (282.0°, 30.0°) (λ_{2}/β_{2})
- Geometric albedo: 0.113±0.004; 0.1183±0.006; 0.218±0.024
- Spectral type: D (S3OS2); L (SDSS-MOC)
- Absolute magnitude (H): 9.4

986 Amelia (prov. designation: A922 UA or 1922 MQ) is a large background asteroid from the outer regions of the asteroid belt, approximately 50 kilometers (31 miles) in diameter. It was discovered on 19 October 1922, by Spanish astronomer Josep Comas i Solà at the Fabra Observatory in Barcelona. The L/D-type asteroid has a rotation period of 9.5 hours. It was named after the discoverer's wife, Amelia Solà.

== Orbit and classification ==
Amelia is a non-family asteroid of the main belt's background population when applying the hierarchical clustering method to its proper orbital elements. It orbits the Sun in the outer asteroid belt at a distance of 2.5–3.8 AU once every 5 years and 6 months (2,024 days; semi-major axis of 3.13 AU). Its orbit has an eccentricity of 0.20 and an inclination of 15° with respect to the ecliptic.

On 12 May 2015, Amelia was first observed as A915 JC (1915 JC) at the Simeiz Observatory on the Crimean peninsula. The body's observation arc begins at the Algiers Observatory in May 1926, more than 3 years after to its official discovery observation at the Fabra Observatory.

== Naming ==
This minor planet was named after Amelia Solà, wife of the discoverer Josep Comas i Solà (1868–1937). The official naming citation was mentioned in The Names of the Minor Planets by Paul Herget in 1955 (H 94).

== Physical characteristics ==
In both the Tholen- and SMASS-like taxonomy of the Small Solar System Objects Spectroscopic Survey (S3OS2), Amelia is a T-type asteroid, while in the SDSS-based taxonomy, the asteroid has been classified as an L-type.

=== Rotation period and poles ===
In October 2000, a rotational lightcurve of Amelia was obtained from photometric observations by American amateur astronomer Robert A. Koff at the Thornton Observatory (713) in Colorado. Lightcurve analysis gave a well-defined rotation period of 9.52±0.01 hours with a brightness amplitude of 0.43±0.03 magnitude (U=3).

In December 2006, a concurring period determination of 9.517 hours (0.396533 days) was made by astronomers Raymond Poncy, Enric Forné, Hiromi Hamanowa, Hiroko Hamanowa and Hilari Pallarés (U=3). In 2016, a modeled lightcurves using photometric data from various sources, rendered a concurring sidereal period of 9.51856±0.00005 h and two spin axes of (80.0°, 30.0°) and (282.0°, 30.0°) in ecliptic coordinates.

=== Diameter and albedo ===
According to the survey carried out by the NEOWISE mission of NASA's Wide-field Infrared Survey Explorer, the Infrared Astronomical Satellite IRAS, and the Japanese Akari satellite, Amelia measures 48.677±0.159, 50.94±1.2 and 52.30±0.78 kilometers in diameter and its surface has an albedo of 0.218±0.024, 0.1183±0.006 and 0.113±0.004, respectively. The Collaborative Asteroid Lightcurve Link derives an albedo of 0.1183 and a diameter of 50.94 kilometers based on an absolute magnitude of 9.4. An asteroid occultation, observed on 2 November 2006, gave a best-fit ellipse dimension of 51.0 × 51.0 kilometers. These timed observations are taken when the asteroid passes in front of a distant star. However the quality of the measurement is rated poorly.
