= 1117 Reginita =

Main-belt asteroid

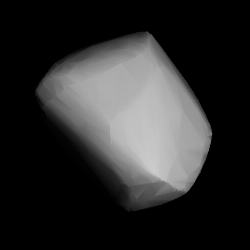
- Shape model of Reginita from its lightcurve

Discovery
- Discovered by: J. Comas Solà
- Discovery site: Fabra Obs.
- Discovery date: 24 May 1927

Designations
- Named after: Reginita (discoverer's niece)
- Alternative designations: 1927 KA · A904 TA
- Minor planet category: main-belt · (inner); background

Orbital characteristics
- Epoch 4 September 2017 (JD 2458000.5)
- Uncertainty parameter 0
- Observation arc: 112.47 yr (41,080 days)
- Aphelion: 2.6934 AU
- Perihelion: 1.8017 AU
- Semi-major axis: 2.2475 AU
- Eccentricity: 0.1984
- Orbital period (sidereal): 3.37 yr (1,231 days)
- Mean anomaly: 245.71°
- Mean motion: 0° 17^{m} 33^{s} / day
- Inclination: 4.3446°
- Longitude of ascending node: 147.14°
- Argument of perihelion: 151.05°

Physical characteristics
- Dimensions: 9.82±2.35 km 10.193±0.250 km 10.29 km (taken); 10.292 km 11.22±0.35 km
- Synodic rotation period: 2.928±0.0134 h 2.94±0.010 h 2.9458±0.0002 h 2.946±0.001 h 2.9463±0.0006 h 2.9464±0.0005 h
- Geometric albedo: 0.293±0.041; 0.3516; 0.3585±0.0785; 0.36±0.13
- Spectral type: S (Tholen)
- Absolute magnitude (H): 11.7

1117 Reginita (prov. designation: 1927 KA) is a stony background asteroid from the inner regions of the asteroid belt. It was discovered on 24 May 1927, by Catalan astronomer Josep Comas i Solà at the Fabra Observatory in Barcelona, Spain, who named it after his niece. The bright S-type asteroid has a notably short rotation period of 2.9 hours and measures approximately 10 kilometers (6.2 miles) in diameter.

== Orbit and classification ==
Reginita is a non-family asteroid of the main belt's background population when applying the hierarchical clustering method to its proper orbital elements. It orbits the Sun in the inner asteroid belt at a distance of 1.8–2.7 AU once every 3 years and 4 months (1,231 days; semi-major axis of 2.25 AU). Its orbit has an eccentricity of 0.20 and an inclination of 4° with respect to the ecliptic. The asteroid was first observed as A904 TA at Heidelberg Observatory in October 1904. The body's observation arc also begins at Heidelberg in April 1930, almost three years after its official discovery observation at Barcelona.

== Naming ==
This minor planet was named after the niece of the discoverer. The naming was mentioned in The Names of the Minor Planets by Paul Herget in 1955 (H 105).

== Physical characteristics ==
In the Tholen classification, Reginita is a common, stony S-type asteroid.

=== Rotation period ===
Several rotational lightcurves of Reginita have been obtained from photometric observations since 1988. The consolidated lightcurve analysis gave a rotation period of 2.946 hours with a brightness amplitude between 0.10 and 0.33 magnitude (U=3).

=== Diameter and albedo ===
According to the survey carried out by the NEOWISE mission of NASA's Wide-field Infrared Survey Explorer (WISE), Reginita measures between 9.82 and 11.22 kilometers in diameter and its surface has an albedo between 0.293 and 0.36. The Collaborative Asteroid Lightcurve Link adopts Petr Pravec's revised WISE data, that is, an albedo of 0.3516 and a diameter of 10.29 kilometers based on an absolute magnitude of 11.69.
