= Ramón Jardí i Borrás =

Ramon Jardí i Borras
- Born: November 13, 1881; Tivissa
- Died: June 5, 1972 (aged 90); Barcelona, Spain
- Monuments: Pluviometer_of_intensities
- Citizenship: Spanish
- Education: University of Barcelona
- Occupations: Seismology, engineer

Ramon Jardí i Borras (Tivissa, November 13, 1881 – June 5, 1972) was a Catalan meteorologist, astronomer and seismologist. He participated in the foundation of the Meteorological Service of Catalonia (1921–1939). He was member of the Academy of Sciences and Arts (1914), professor of electricity at Industrial School University (1917), professor at the University of Barcelona (1930–1951) and a member of the Institut d'Estudis Catalans (1926–1931).

== Early life ==
Ramon Jardí studied at the Faculty of Science, where he specialized in Physical Science. After obtaining his doctorate, he taught at the University of Barcelona (1930–1951).

== Career ==
In the engineering field, he modified Bourdon's anemograph that was installed at the Fabra Observatory to address design problems. He named the improved model "Bourdon-Jardí". It continues in use. Upon approval of the creation of the Meteorological Service of Catalonia by the Permanent Council of the Commonwealth of Catalonia in September 1919, Eduard Fontserè was appointed its director. He appointed Ramon Jardí as his assistant. While director of the Fabra Observatory, he represented the Meteorological Service of Catalonia at international meetings of the Conference of Directors of Meteorological Services.

== Pluviometer of intensities ==
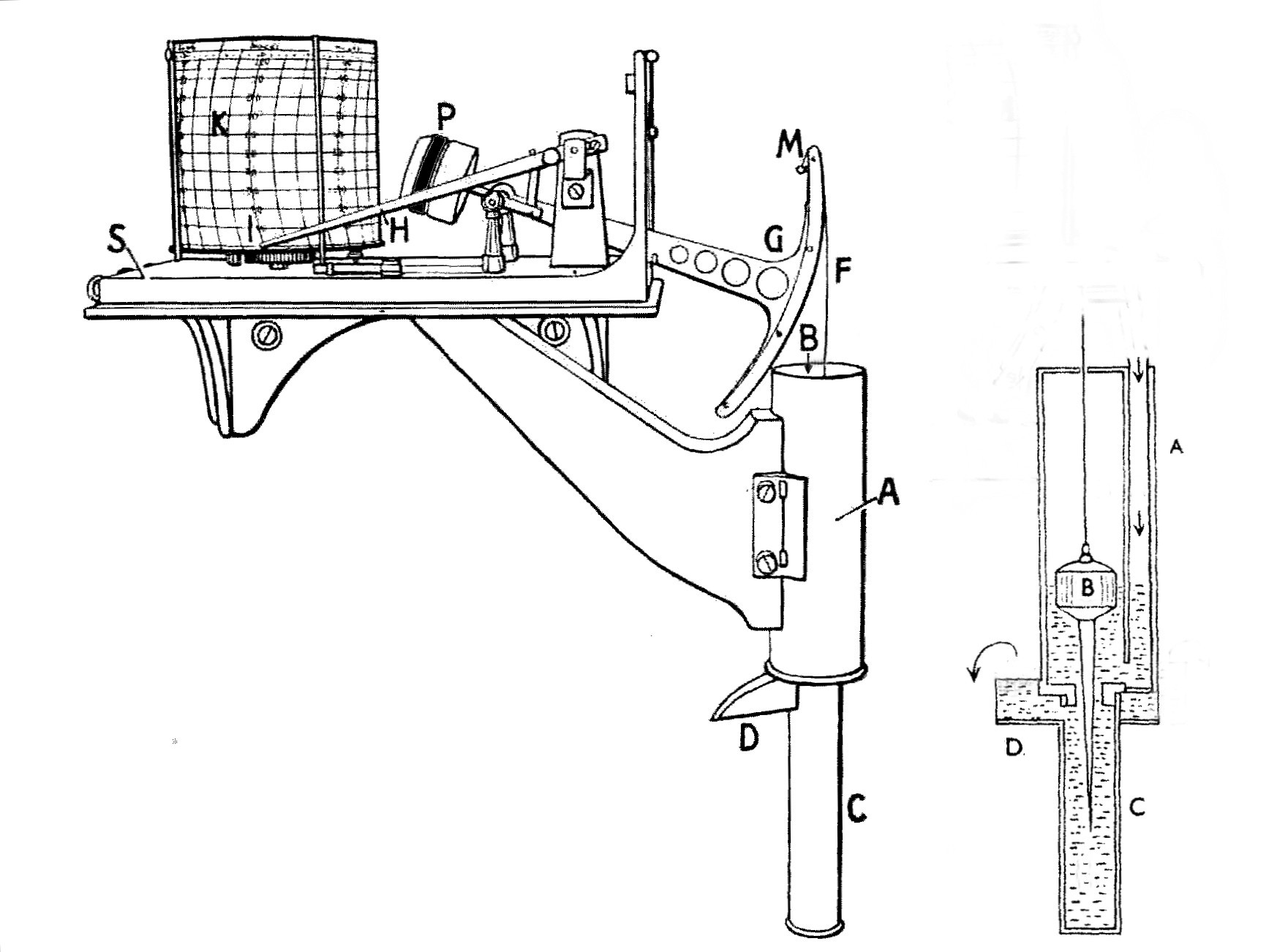
Pluviometer of intensities (Jardí, 1921)

The pluviometer of intensities (or Jardi's pluviometer), is a tool that measures the average intensity of rainfall over an interval of time. The device was initially designed to record rainfall in Barcelona, but eventually spread throughout the world.

=== History ===
In 1921, the president of the Commonwealth of Catalonia of that time, Josep Puig i Cadafalch, explained to Eduard Fontserè his concerns about the need for a method to measure the intensity of rainfall. A huge downpour had fallen in Barcelona not long before. Fontserè commissioned Jardí to construct a pluviometer that could record a similar rainfall. Before the end of that year, his device was already working in the Meteorological Service of Catalonia. Patented copies of this pluviometer were mass-produced by two international companies: Richard (Paris) and Casella (London).

In June 1927, two pluviometers entered into operation, one in the Department of Meteorology and one in the Fabra Observatory. Thanks to the device and to the uninterrupted activity of the Observatory, Barcelona has a record of "almost-instantaneous" intensities of rainfall that is the most comprehensive in the world.

=== Operation ===
It employs the principle of feedback .. the incoming water pushes the buoy upwards, outgoing water lowers it, adjusting "conic needle" to let pass the same amount of water that enters into the container, this way.. "inked needle" records, on the drum's sheet, the amount of water flowing through the "conic hole" at every moment -in mm of rainfall per square-meter

Jardi's pluviometer consists of a drum that rotates at constant speed. The drum moves a graduated sheet of cardboard (the cardboard sheet is usually for one day) that records the time at the abscissa while the y axis indicates the height of rainfall in mm. A pen moves vertically as the cardboard moves below it. The pen is driven by a buoy, marking the paper with the instantaneous rainfall rate over a period of time.

When rain falls, it is collected by an external funnel. It passes into the cylindrical reservoir and raises the buoy... that raises the pen along the vertical axis, marking the cardboard accordingly. If the rainfall does not vary, the water level in the container remains constant, and the pen's mark is approximately a horizontal line, proportional to the amount of water that is falling. If the rain is heavy enough, it can exceed the device's capacity. At that level, the regulating hole is uncovered, discarding the excess water. If the rain decreases, the buoy drops at the same speed -as the cylindrical reservoir empties.

The pluviometer recorded precipitation in Barcelona for 95 years and in places such as Hong-Kong).

To measure the average intensity of rainfall in a certain interval of time, the Pluviometer of intensities uses the formula:

$$\frac{h (\Delta \mathit{T})}{\Delta \mathit{T}}= \mathit{i}\,$$

Intensity varies over time. The pluviometer records instantaneous rain intensity (as its name defines):

$$\lim_{\Delta\mathit{T}\rightarrow 0} \frac{h(\Delta\mathit{T})}{\Delta\mathit{T}} =\mathit{i}(\mathit{t})$$

== See also ==
- Fabra Observatory
