= Vandellòs i l'Hospitalet de l'Infant =

- Municipality
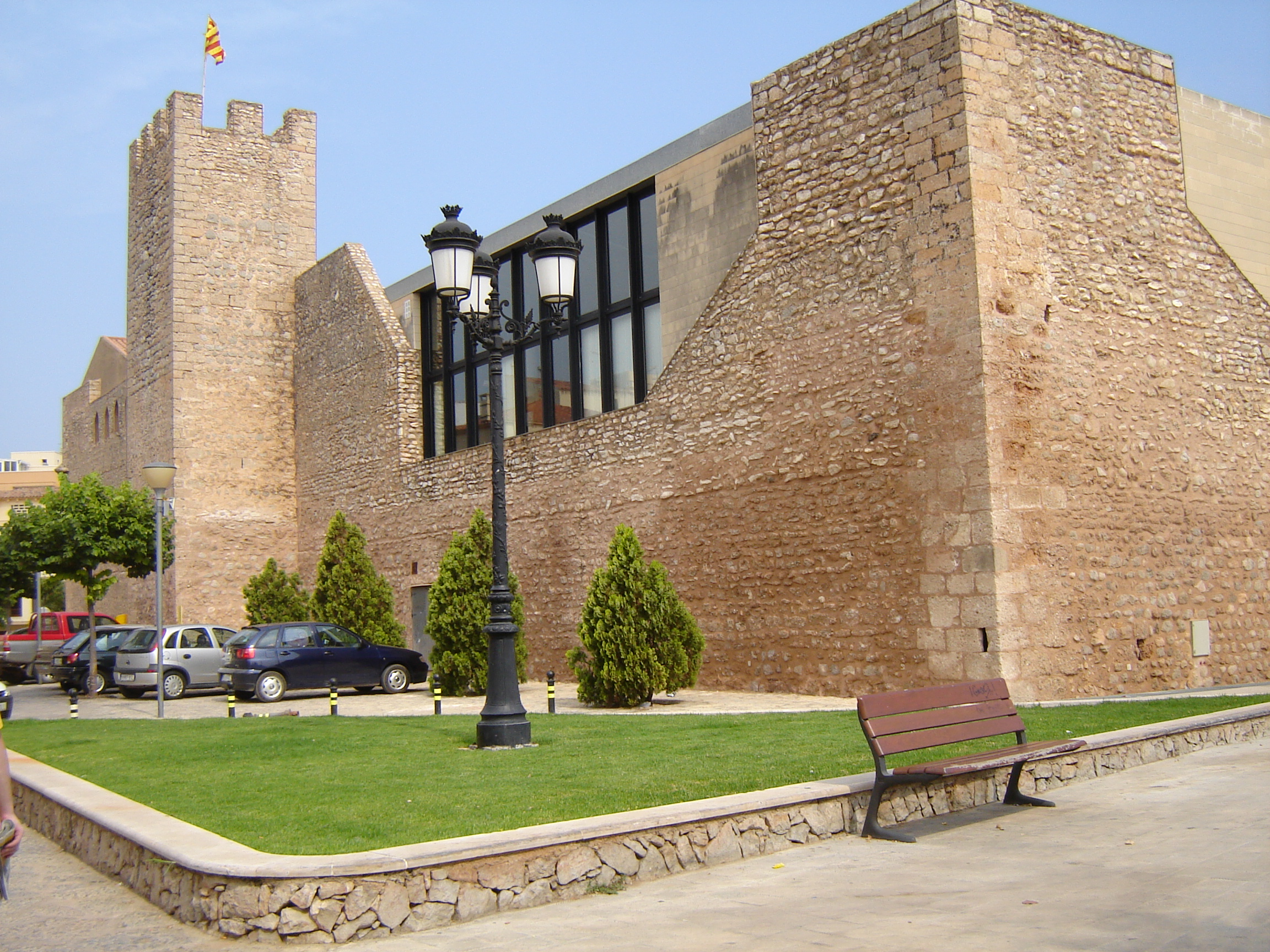

- Flag Coat of arms

- Location in Catalonia
- Coordinates: 41.020°N 0.831°E
- Country: Spain
- Community: Catalonia
- Province: Tarragona
- Comarca: Baix Camp

Government
  - Mayor: Alfons García Rodríguez (2015)

Area
  - Total: 102.7 km^{2} (39.7 sq mi)
- Elevation: 281 m (922 ft)

Population (2025-01-01)
  - Total: 7,143
  - Density: 69.55/km^{2} (180.1/sq mi)
- Demonym(s): Vandellossenc, vandellossenca
- Website: vandellos-hospitalet.cat

Vandellòs i l'Hospitalet de l'Infant (Catalan pronunciation: [bandeˈʎɔz i luspitəˈlɛd də limˈfan]) is a municipality in the comarca of the Baix Camp in Catalonia, Spain. It has a population of 7,143 (register office, 2025).

It is situated in the south-west of the comarca, between the Serra de Llaberia range and the coast. The town of Vandellòs is some 15 km inland, connected with the AP-7 autopista and the N-340 road (which run near to the coast) by the C-44 road. The town of L'Hospitalet de l'Infant is on the coast, and is an important tourist centre: it is served by a station on the Renfe railway line between Tarragona and Valencia.

== History ==
In medieval times the town was part of the Barony of Entença.

== Nuclear power stations ==
The nuclear power stations Vandellòs I and II are situated on the coast near l'Hospitalet de l'Infant.

== Demography ==
1900	1930	1950	1970	1986	2007
2722	2336	1936	2394	4338	5420

== See also ==
- Fatges
