= 1136 Mercedes =

Main-belt asteroid

Discovery
- Discovered by: J. Comas Solà
- Discovery site: Fabra Obs.
- Discovery date: 30 October 1929

Designations
- Named after: Mercedes (discoverer's sister-in-law)
- Alternative designations: 1929 UA · 1966 XB
- Minor planet category: main-belt · (middle) background

Orbital characteristics
- Epoch 4 September 2017 (JD 2458000.5)
- Uncertainty parameter 0
- Observation arc: 86.23 yr (31,497 days)
- Aphelion: 3.2207 AU
- Perihelion: 1.9111 AU
- Semi-major axis: 2.5659 AU
- Eccentricity: 0.2552
- Orbital period (sidereal): 4.11 yr (1,501 days)
- Mean anomaly: 171.68°
- Mean motion: 0° 14^{m} 23.28^{s} / day
- Inclination: 8.9825°
- Longitude of ascending node: 209.53°
- Argument of perihelion: 148.49°

Physical characteristics
- Dimensions: 25.23 km (derived); 25.296±0.249 km 26.29±6.21 km 26.349±0.078 km 26.66±0.28 km 33.19±6.54 km
- Synodic rotation period: 6.448±0.002 h 15.6 h (poor); 24.64±0.01 h
- Geometric albedo: 0.05±0.04; 0.08±0.06; 0.084±0.015; 0.1007 (derived); 0.1018±0.0230; 0.103±0.003
- Spectral type: S (assumed)
- Absolute magnitude (H): 11.00 · 11.10 · 11.2 · 11.22 · 11.68±0.75

1136 Mercedes, provisional designation 1929 UA, is a background asteroid from the central regions of the asteroid belt, approximately 26 kilometers in diameter. It was discovered on 30 October 1929, by Catalan astronomer Josep Comas i Solà at the Fabra Observatory in Barcelona, Spain. The asteroid was named for the sister-in-law of the discoverer.

== Orbit and classification ==
Mercedes is not a member of any known asteroid family and belongs to the belt's background population. It orbits the Sun in the central main-belt at a distance of 1.9–3.2 AU once every 4 years and 1 month (1,501 days). Its orbit has an eccentricity of 0.26 and an inclination of 9° with respect to the ecliptic. The body's observation arc begins at Yerkes Observatory in March 1931, more than a year after its official discovery observation at Fabra.

== Physical characteristics ==
Mercedes is an assumed S-type asteroid.

=== Rotation period ===
The asteroid has an ambiguous rotation period. A lightcurve of Mercedes obtained in 1998, gave a period of 6.448 hours and a brightness variation of 0.10 magnitude (U=2), while another lightcurve from 2007, gave a much longer period of 24.64 hours with an amplitude of 0.15 (U=2). A third period of 15.6 hours is considered of poor quality (U=1).

=== Diameter and albedo ===
According to the surveys carried out by the Japanese Akari satellite and the NEOWISE mission of NASA's Wide-field Infrared Survey Explorer, Mercedes measures between 25.296 and 33.19 kilometers in diameter and its surface has an albedo between 0.05 and 0.103.

The Collaborative Asteroid Lightcurve Link derives an albedo of 0.1007 and a diameter of 25.23 kilometers based on an absolute magnitude of 11.1.

== Naming ==
This minor planet was named by Josep Comas i Solà for his sister-in-law, Mercedes. The official naming citation was mentioned in The Names of the Minor Planets by Paul Herget in 1955 (H 106).
