= La Serra d'Almos =

- Village
- Seal

- Location in Spain
- Coordinates: 41°4′47.30″N 0°44′39″E
- Country: Spain
- Autonomous community: Catalonia
- Province: Tarragona
- Comarca: Ribera d'Ebre
- Municipality: Tivissa

Area
  - Total: 100 km^{2} (39 sq mi)
- Elevation: 229 m (751 ft)

Population (2009)
  - Total: 273
  - Density: 2.7/km^{2} (7.1/sq mi)
- Time zone: UTC+1 (CET)
  - Summer (DST): UTC+2 (CEST)

La Serra d'Almos is a village located within the municipal term of Tivissa, in the Ribera d'Ebre comarca, Catalonia, Spain.

== History ==
Administratively La Serra d'Almos was formerly a municipality in its own right since 1787. In 1940, one year after the Spanish Civil War, the village was merged with the Tivissa municipality. Since 2009 it has become a Decentralized Municipal Entity (EMD), though still depending from Tivissa, located about 7 km away.

== Geography ==
La Serra d'Almos has a church dedicated to Sant Domingo. The village is located in picturesque surroundings, in view of the Valley of the Ebro River at the feet of the Serra de Montalt, a subrange of the Serra de Llaberia, surrounded by vineyards and olive trees. Nowadays it is a favoured agritourism destination.

The wine produced in La Serra d'Almos is marketed under the Montsant DO denomination. Also local olives yield high-quality oil that has been awarded Protected Designation of Origin (PDO). This oil is marketed as DO Siurana.

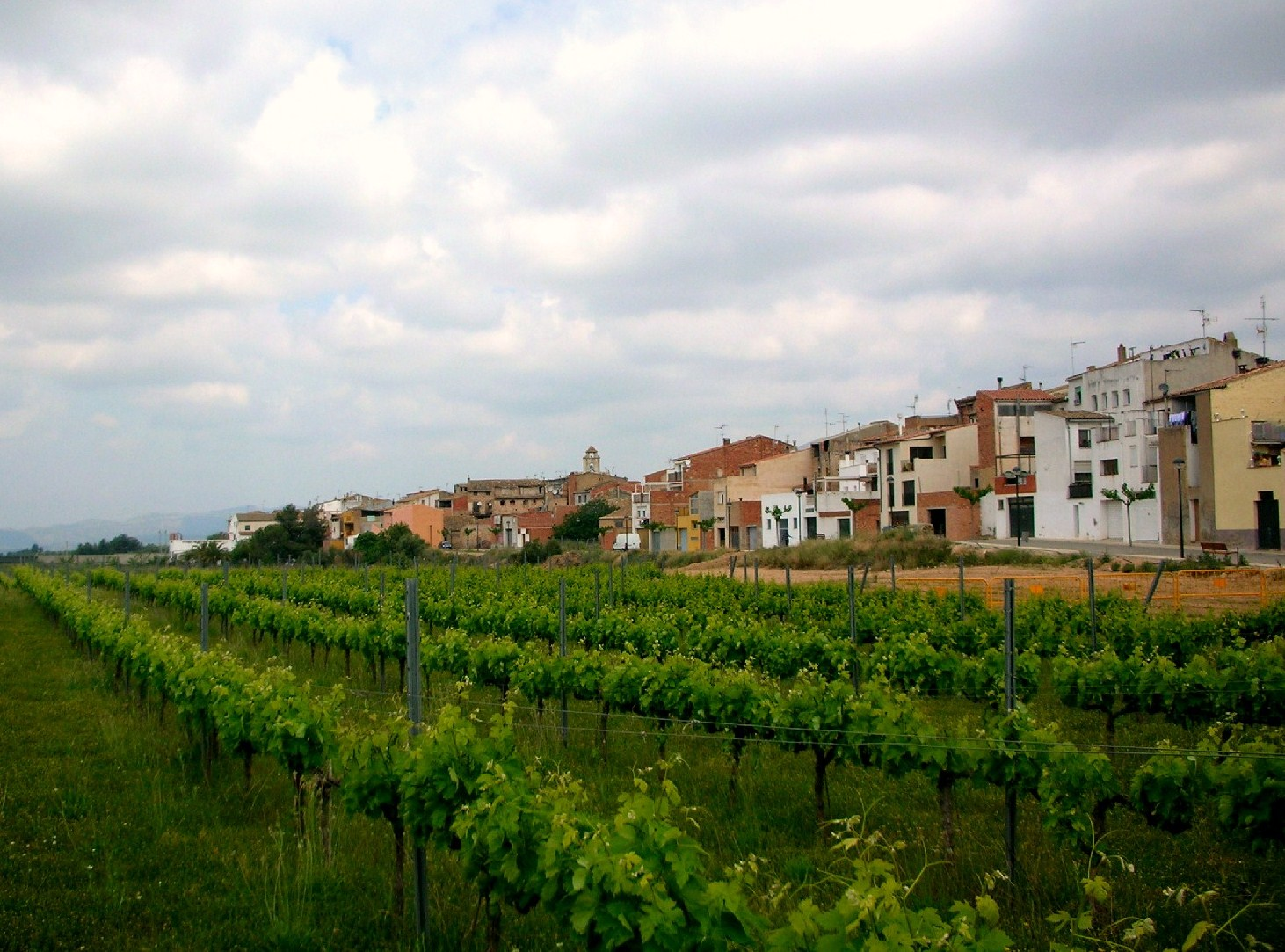
View of La Serra d'Almos

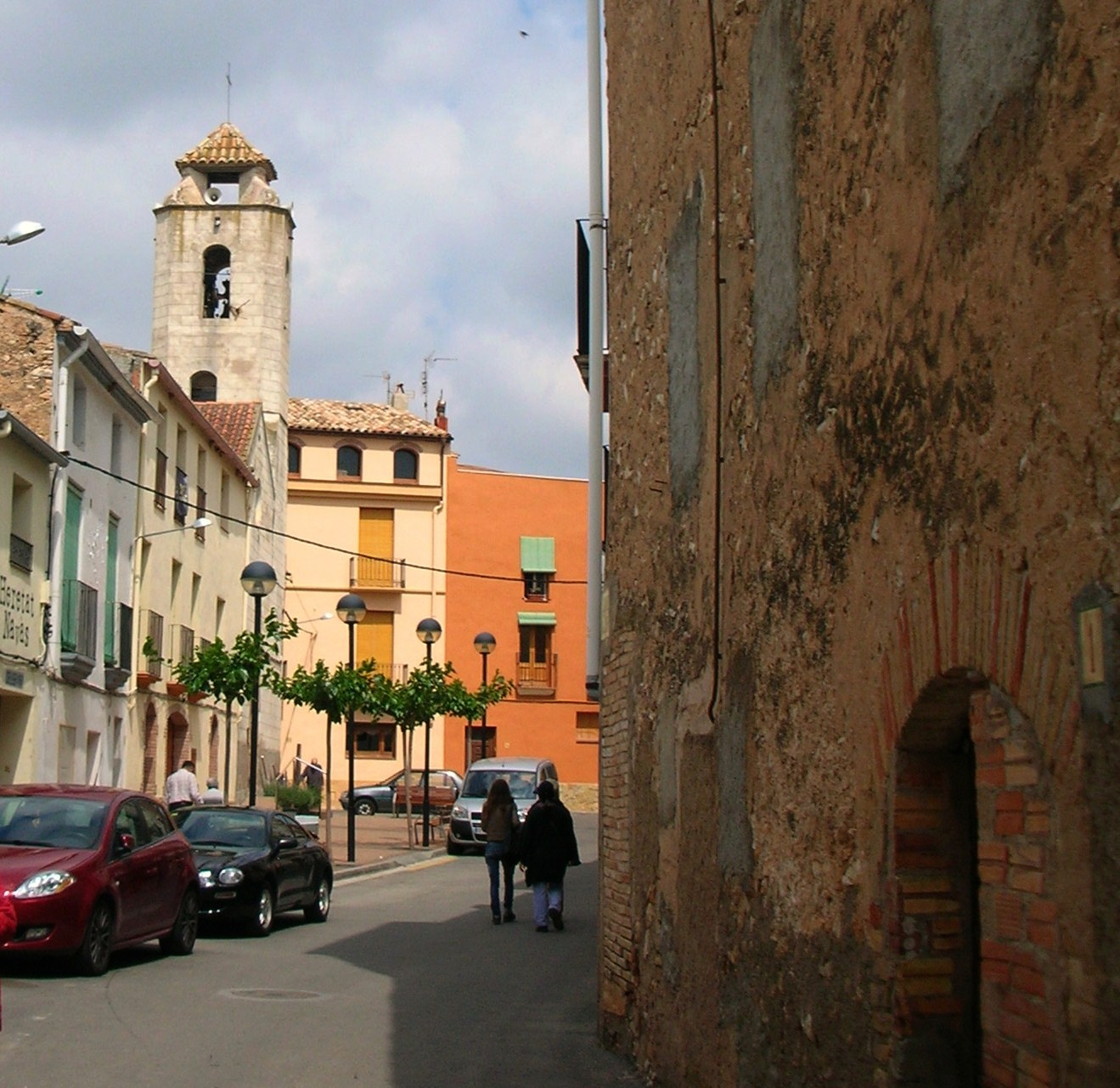
Main street in La Serra d'Almos with Sant Domingo church
