= 1626 Sadeya =

Main-belt asteroid binary

Discovery
- Discovered by: J. Comas Solà
- Discovery site: Fabra Obs.
- Discovery date: 10 January 1927

Designations
- Named after: Spanish and American Astronomical Society
- Alternative designations: 1927 AA · 1956 AA
- Minor planet category: main-belt · Phocaea

Orbital characteristics
- Epoch 17 December 2020 (JD 2459200.5)
- Uncertainty parameter 0
- Observation arc: 94.02 yr (34,339 d)
- Aphelion: 3.0090 AU
- Perihelion: 1.7185 AU
- Semi-major axis: 2.3638 AU
- Eccentricity: 0.2730
- Orbital period (sidereal): 3.63 yr (1,327 d)
- Mean anomaly: 335.85°
- Mean motion: 0° 16^{m} 16.32^{s} / day
- Inclination: 25.312°
- Longitude of ascending node: 279.48°
- Argument of perihelion: 149.29°
- Known satellites: 1 (0.26D_{s}/D_{p}; P: 2.14 d)

Physical characteristics
- Mean diameter: 14.25±2.36 km 14.77±0.19 km 15.140±0.490 km 15.95 km (calculated)
- Synodic rotation period: 3.414±0.005 h 3.418±0.001; 3.419±0.001 h 3.420±0.001 h 3.4200±0.0006 h 3.42048±0.00005 h 3.438±0.009 h
- Geometric albedo: 0.23 (assumed); 0.30±0.16; 0.486±0.067; 0.512±0.016
- Spectral type: S
- Absolute magnitude (H): 10.50 · 11.10 · 11.2

1626 Sadeya (provisional designation 1927 AA) is a stony Phocaea asteroid and binary system from the inner regions of the asteroid belt, approximately 15 kilometers (9.3 miles) in diameter. It was discovered on 10 January 1927, by Catalan astronomer Josep Comas i Solà at Fabra Observatory in Barcelona, Spain, and named after the Spanish and American Astronomical Society. The discovery of a companion was announced on 1 December 2020.

== Orbit and classification ==
The stony S-type asteroid is a member of the Phocaea family (701), a group of asteroids with rather high inclinations between 18° and 32°. It orbits the Sun in the inner main-belt at a distance of 1.7–3.0 AU once every 3 years and 8 months (1,327 days; semi-major axis of 2.36 AU). Its orbit has an eccentricity of 0.27 and an inclination of 25° with respect to the ecliptic. Sadeya's observation arc begins 2 months after its official discovery with a precovery taken at Yerkes Observatory.

== Naming ==
This minor planet was named after the Spanish and American Astronomical Society, also known by its acronym "S.A.D.E.Y.A." (Spanish: Sociedad Astrónomica de España y América). It was founded by Comas i Solà, who also was its first president. The official naming citation was published by the Minor Planet Center on 30 January 1964 (M.P.C. 2277).

== Physical characteristics ==
=== Rotation period ===
Sadeya has a well-defined rotation period between 3.414 and 3.438 hours with a change in brightness between 0.07 and 0.22 in magnitude (U=2+/3-/3). These numerous rotational lightcurves were obtained by ESO astronomers, Julian Oey, Pierre Antonini, Ramon Naves, Enric Forné, Hilari Pallares, Brian Warner and Vladimir Benishek between 1996 and 2014.

=== Diameter and albedo ===
According to the surveys carried out by the Japanese Akari satellite and NASA's Wide-field Infrared Survey Explorer with its subsequent NEOWISE mission, Sadeya measures between 14.25 and 15.14 kilometers in diameter, and its surface has an albedo between 0.30 and 0.512. The Collaborative Asteroid Lightcurve Link assumes a lower albedo of 0.23 – derived from 25 Phocaea, the namesake of the Phocaea family – and calculates a diameter of 15.95 kilometers with an absolute magnitude of 11.2.

== Satellite ==
On 1 December 2020, the discovery of a satellite in orbit of Sadeya was announced by Vladimir Benishek, Petr Pravec, and several other collaborators. The minor-planet moon measures approximately 3.81 kilometers (2.4 miles) in diameter, or 26% that of its primary, and has an orbital period of about 51.3 hours.
