= 1655 Comas Solà =

Rare-type asteroid

Discovery
- Discovered by: J. Comas Solà
- Discovery site: Fabra Obs.
- Discovery date: 28 November 1929

Designations
- Named after: Josep Comas i Solà (discoverer himself)
- Alternative designations: 1929 WG · 1929 WC_{1} 1958 BG · A901 VG
- Minor planet category: main-belt · (middle)

Orbital characteristics
- Epoch 4 September 2017 (JD 2458000.5)
- Uncertainty parameter 0
- Observation arc: 114.97 yr (41,994 days)
- Aphelion: 3.4357 AU
- Perihelion: 2.1248 AU
- Semi-major axis: 2.7803 AU
- Eccentricity: 0.2358
- Orbital period (sidereal): 4.64 yr (1,693 days)
- Mean anomaly: 323.81°
- Mean motion: 0° 12^{m} 45.36^{s} / day
- Inclination: 9.6002°
- Longitude of ascending node: 111.14°
- Argument of perihelion: 323.52°

Physical characteristics
- Dimensions: 30.57±2.1 km (IRAS:3); 32.80±0.69 km 35.6±3.6 km 35.943±0.183; 39.942±0.390 km 40±4 km
- Synodic rotation period: 12 h (dated); 20.4±0.1 h 20.456±0.004 h
- Geometric albedo: 0.04±0.01; 0.0425±0.0069; 0.045±0.010; 0.05±0.01; 0.065±0.003; 0.0726±0.011 (IRAS:3)
- Spectral type: XFU (Tholen); B (SMASS) · B B–V = 0.642; U–B = 0.262
- Absolute magnitude (H): 11.04

1655 Comas Solà, provisional designation 1929 WG, is a rare-type asteroid from the central region of the asteroid belt, approximately 36 kilometers in diameter. It was discovered on 28 November 1929, by Spanish astronomer of Catalan origin, Josep Comas i Solà at the Fabra Observatory in Barcelona, Spain. It was later named after the discoverer.

== Orbit and classification ==
It orbits the Sun in the central main-belt at a distance of 2.1–3.4 AU once every 4 years and 8 months (1,693 days). Its orbit has an eccentricity of 0.24 and an inclination of 10° with respect to the ecliptic. It was first observed as A901 VG at Heidelberg Observatory in 1901, extending the body's observation arc by 28 years prior to its official discovery observation at Barcelona.

== Physical characteristics ==
Comas Solà shows as rare XFU-type and B-type spectrum in the Tholen and SMASS classification scheme, respectively.

=== Lightcurves ===
A rotational lightcurve obtained by American amateur astronomer Robert Stephens gave a well-defined rotation period of 20.456 hours with a brightness variation of 0.20 magnitude (U=3).

=== Diameter and albedo ===
According to the surveys carried out by the Infrared Astronomical Satellite IRAS, the Japanese Akari satellite, and NASA's Wide-field Infrared Survey Explorer with its subsequent NEOWISE mission, Comas Solà measures between 30.57 and 40 kilometers in diameter and its surface has an albedo between 0.04 and 0.073. More recently published revised WISE/NEOWISE-data gave a refined diameter of 35.6 and 35.94 kilometers, respectively. The Collaborative Asteroid Lightcurve Link agrees with IRAS, and adopts an albedo of 0.0726 with a diameter of 30.57 kilometers and an absolute magnitude of 11.04.

== Naming ==
This minor planet was named in memory of its discoverer Josep Comas i Solà (1868–1937), first director of the discovering Fabra Observatory, Barcelona, capital of the Catalonia region in northeastern Spain. He was a prolific observer of minor planets and comets in the 1920s, including the periodic comet 32P/Comas Solà which is named after him.

1655 Comas Solà is one of the rare cases where a minor planet bears the name of its discoverer. Solà is also honored by the asteroid 1102 Pepita, named after his nickname, and by the 127-kilometer wide Martian crater Comas Sola. The official naming citation for 1655 Comas Solà was published by the Minor Planet Center on 1 June 1980 (M.P.C. 5357).
