= 480 Hansa =

Main-belt asteroid

Discovery
- Discovered by: M. F. Wolf; L. Carnera
- Discovery site: Heidelberg Obs.
- Discovery date: 21 May 1901

Designations
- Pronunciation: /ˈhænsə/
- Named after: Hanseatic League (medieval trade association)
- Alternative designations: 1901 GL · A905 JA; A911 UJ
- Minor planet category: main-belt · (middle); Hansa

Orbital characteristics
- Epoch 23 March 2018 (JD 2458200.5)
- Uncertainty parameter 0
- Observation arc: 116.44 yr (42,528 d)
- Aphelion: 2.7656 AU
- Perihelion: 2.5213 AU
- Semi-major axis: 2.6435 AU
- Eccentricity: 0.0462
- Orbital period (sidereal): 4.30 yr (1,570 d)
- Mean anomaly: 222.78°
- Mean motion: 0° 13^{m} 45.48^{s} / day
- Inclination: 21.307°
- Longitude of ascending node: 237.18°
- Argument of perihelion: 214.53°

Physical characteristics
- Mean diameter: 55.94±0.58 km 56.22±2.5 km 65.67±20.89 km
- Synodic rotation period: 11.758 h 16.12 h 16.183±0.001 h 16.1894±0.0005 h 16.19 h 16.22 h
- Geometric albedo: 0.162±0.264; 0.2485±0.024; 0.254±0.007
- Spectral type: Tholen = S B–V = 0.854; U–B = 0.439
- Absolute magnitude (H): 8.38; 8.51

480 Hansa, provisional designation 1901 GL, is a stony asteroid and the namesake of the Hansa family located in the central region of the asteroid belt, approximately 56 kilometers (35 miles) in diameter. It was discovered on 21 May 1901, by astronomers Max Wolf and Luigi Carnera at the Heidelberg Observatory in southwest Germany. The S-type asteroid has a rotation period of 16.19 hours and possibly an elongated shape. It was named after the Hanseatic League, a medieval European trade association.

== Orbit and classification ==
Hansa is the namesake and parent body of the stony Hansa family (803), a high-inclination family with more than a thousand known members. Hansa and the asteroid 925 Alphonsina are the two largest member of this family.

It orbits the Sun in the central asteroid belt at a distance of 2.5–2.8 AU once every 4 years and 4 months (1,570 days; semi-major axis of 2.64 AU). Its orbit has an eccentricity of 0.05 (i.e. close to a perfect circle) and an inclination of 21° with respect to the ecliptic. The body's observation arc begins at Heidelberg, the night after its official discovery observation in May 1901.

== Physical characteristics ==
In the Tholen classification, Hansa is a common, stony S-type asteroid. The near infrared spectra suggests the surface has a primary component of low-Ca pyroxene with lower amounts of olivine.

=== Rotation period ===
Several rotational lightcurves of Hansa were obtained from photometric observations since the 1990s (U = 2/2−/2+/3). Analysis of the two best-rated lightcurves gave a rotation period of 16.19 hours with a brightness amplitude of 0.58 and 0.44 magnitude, respectively (U = 3/3). A high brightness variation typically indicates an elongated shape.

A modeled lightcurve using photometric data from large collaboration network was published in 2016. It gave a concurring period of 16.1894 hours, as well as two spin axes at (352.0°, −18.0°) and (173.0°, −32.0°) in ecliptic coordinates (λ, β).

=== Diameter and albedo ===
According to the surveys carried out by the Infrared Astronomical Satellite IRAS, the Japanese Akari satellite and the NEOWISE mission of NASA's Wide-field Infrared Survey Explorer, Hansa measures between 55.94 and 65.67 kilometers in diameter and its surface has an albedo between 0.162 and 0.254.

The Collaborative Asteroid Lightcurve Link adopts the results obtained by IRAS, that is an albedo of 0.2485 and a diameter of 56.22 kilometers based on an absolute magnitude of 8.38.

== Naming ==
This minor planet was named after the Hanseatic League (German: Hansa; Hanse), a medieval confederation of merchant guilds and market towns in Northern Europe and the Baltic region. On the height of its expansion during the 14th and 15th century, the league included cities that are now located in Germany, Poland, Sweden, Estonia, Latvia, the Netherlands and Russia. The official naming citation was mentioned in The Names of the Minor Planets by Paul Herget in 1955 (H 52). The name was proposed by astronomer Heinrich Kreutz in 1906, who was an editor of the journal Astronomische Nachrichten based in the German city of Kiel, which was a member town of the Hanse League.
