= Montalt =

Mountain in Catalonia, Spain

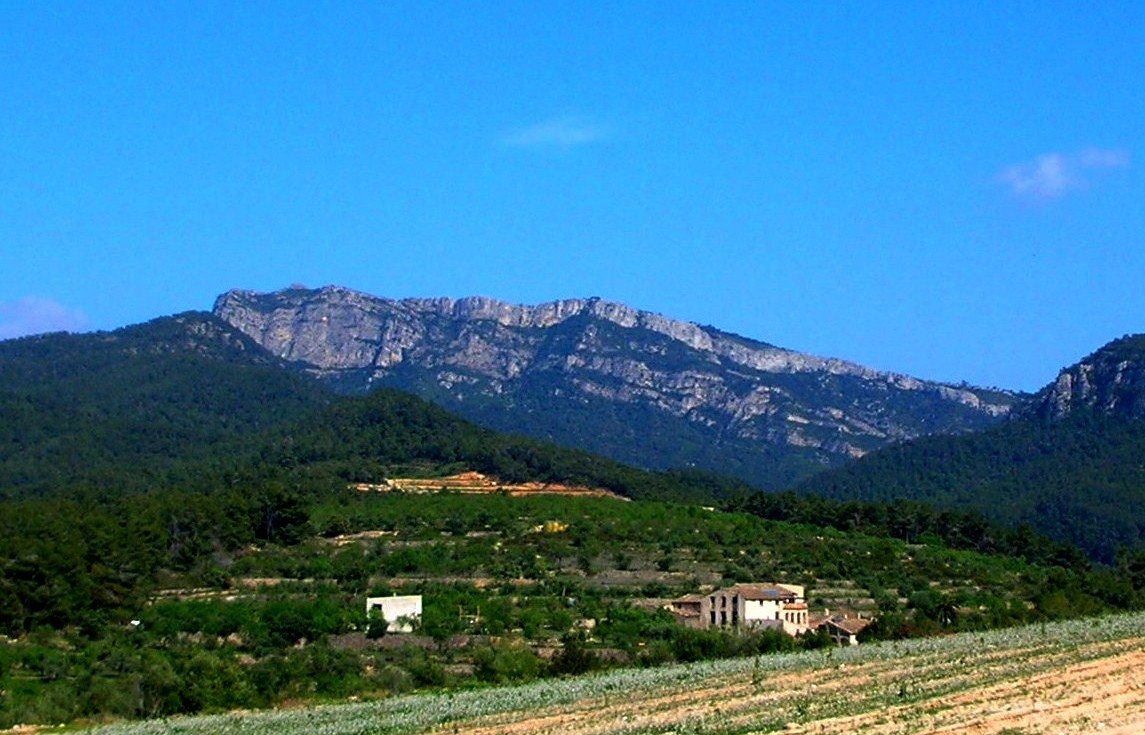
- View of the Montalt from La Serra d'Almos

Highest point
- Elevation: 749 m (2,457 ft)
- Coordinates: 41°3′49.0″N 00°48′8.880″E

Geography
- Location within Catalonia
- Location: Ribera d'Ebre, Catalonia
- Parent range: Serra de Montalt

Geology
- Mountain type: Karstic

Climbing
- Easiest route: Hike from La Serra d'Almos

Montalt is a mountain that is part of the Serra de Montalt, Serra de Llaberia in Catalonia, Spain. It has an elevation of 749 metres (2,457 ft) above sea level.

There is a triangulation station (256141001) at the summit.

== See also ==
- Tivissa
- Mountains of Catalonia
