= La Miranda =

Mountain in Spain

Coordinates: 41.0924°N 0.8629°E

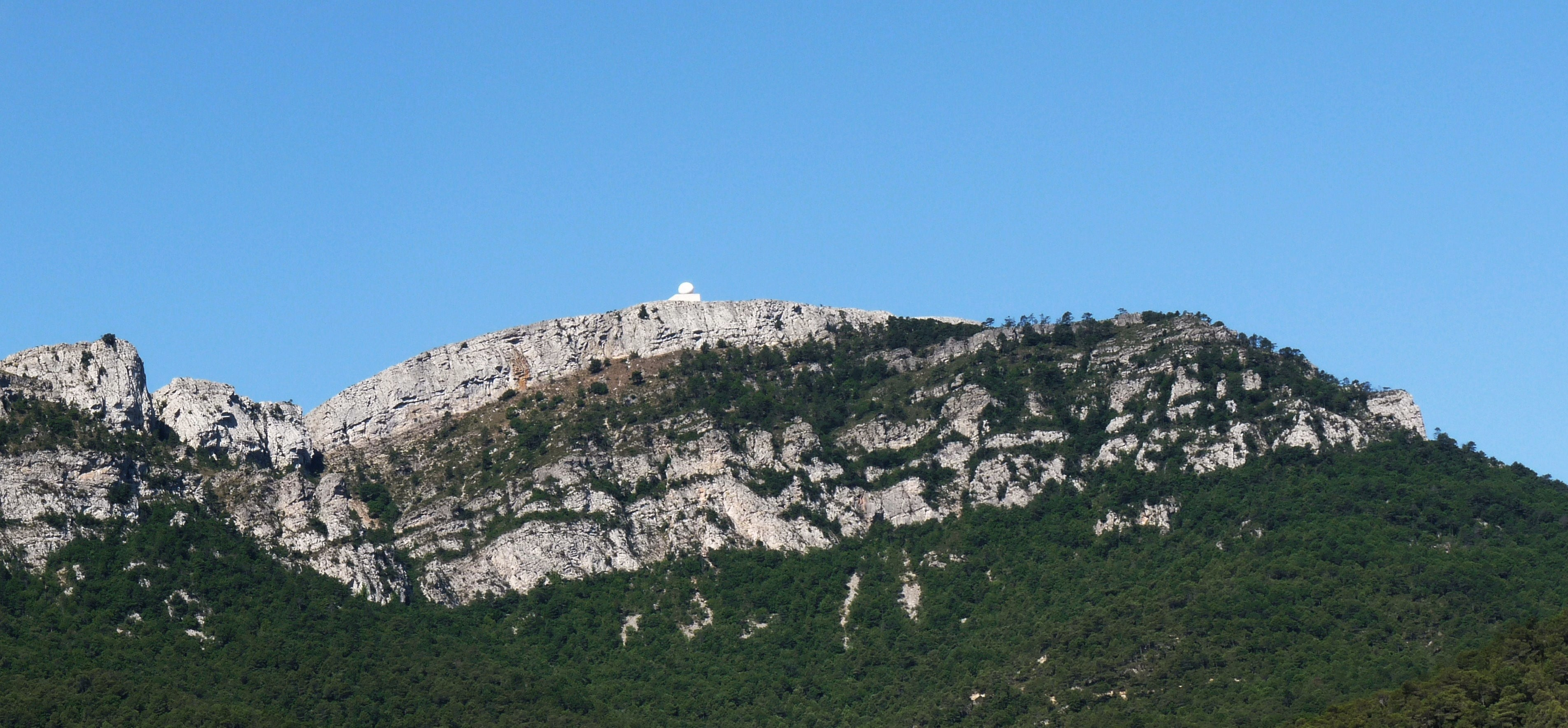

Highest point
- Elevation: 918 m (3,012 ft)
- Listing: Mountains in Catalonia

Geography
- Location: Baix Camp & Ribera d'Ebre, Catalonia
- Parent range: Serra de Llaberia

Geology
- Mountain type: Karstic

Climbing
- First ascent: Unknown
- Easiest route: From Colldejou

La Miranda is a mountain of the Catalan Pre-Coastal Range in the autonomous community of Catalonia in Spain. It has an elevation of 918 metres above sea level.

It is the second-highest summit of the Serra de Llaberia range. There is a weather radar at the top.
