= 804 Hispania =

Main-belt asteroid

Discovery
- Discovered by: J. Comas Solá
- Discovery date: 20 March 1915

Designations
- Pronunciation: /hɪˈspeɪniə/
- Named after: Spain
- Alternative designations: 1915 WT
- Minor planet category: Main belt
- Adjectives: Hispanian

Orbital characteristics
- Epoch 31 July 2016 (JD 2457600.5)
- Uncertainty parameter 0
- Observation arc: 39,655 d (108.57 yr)
- Aphelion: 3.2343 AU (483.84 Gm)
- Perihelion: 2.4418 AU (365.29 Gm)
- Semi-major axis: 2.8381 AU (424.57 Gm)
- Eccentricity: 0.13961
- Orbital period (sidereal): 4.78 yr (1746.3 d)
- Average orbital speed: 17.60 km/s
- Mean anomaly: 277.552°
- Mean motion: 0° 12^{m} 22.104^{s} / day
- Inclination: 15.395°
- Longitude of ascending node: 347.611°
- Argument of perihelion: 344.626°
- Earth MOID: 1.43481 AU (214.645 Gm)
- Jupiter MOID: 2.16034 AU (323.182 Gm)
- T_{Jupiter}: 3.244

Physical characteristics
- Mean diameter: 148.25±4.08 km (composite estimate); 137.952±1.964 km
- Mass: (5.00±1.78)×10^{18} kg (composite estimate) (2.97±0.42)×10^{18} kg (Note: Calculated from its standard gravitational parameter GM = 0.198±0.028 km^{3}/s^{2}.)
- Mean density: 2.93±1.06 g/cm^{3} 2.16 g/cm^{3} (Note: Assuming a diameter of 138 km.)
- Equatorial surface gravity: ~0.107m/s^{2}
- Equatorial escape velocity: ~129.9m/s
- Synodic rotation period: 14.845 h (0.6185 d); 7.405±0.010 h
- Geometric albedo: 0.054±0.005
- Temperature: ~167.4K
- Spectral type: PC (Tholen); C (SMASSII)
- Absolute magnitude (H): 7.98

804 Hispania is a minor planet orbiting the Sun. It was discovered from Barcelona (Spain) on 20 March 1915 by Josep Comas Solá (1868–1937), the first asteroid to be discovered by a Spaniard.

Hispania is a carbonaceous C-type asteroid. Busarev and Taran (2002) classed it as CP type with a spectrum that shows a highly hydrated body. It has a diameter of 122 kilometers according to measurements made with the W. M. Keck Observatory. This is 30% smaller than the size estimated from the IRAS observatory data. It has a size ratio of 1.16 between its major and minor axes. Two alternate rotation periods have been found for this asteroid: 7.4 hours and double that at 14.8 hours. To explain this discrepancy, it is possible the asteroid has a peculiar shape or it may be a double asteroid.
