= Ilercavones =

Ancient people of the Iberian Peninsula

The Iberian Peninsula in the 3rd century BC

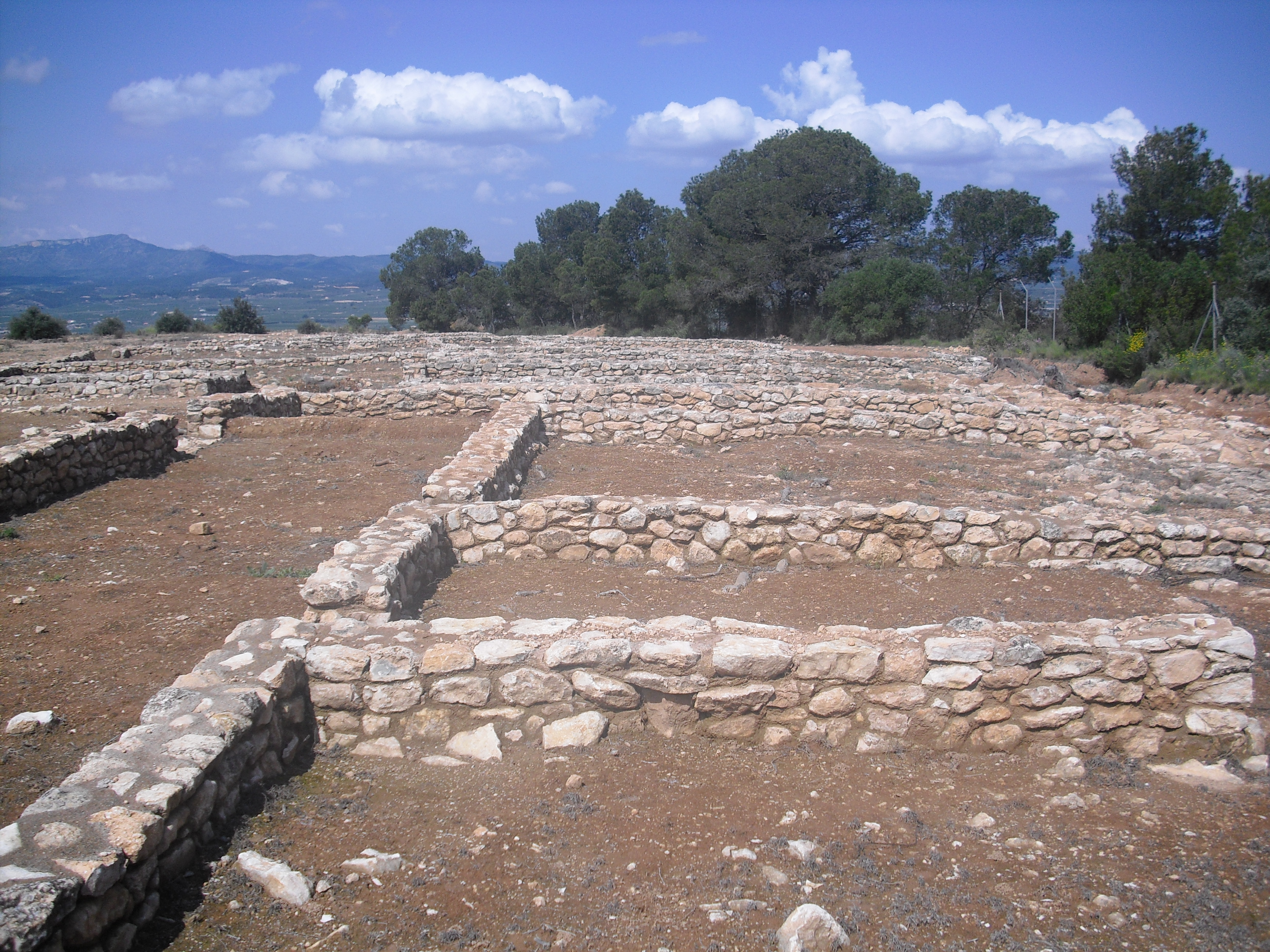
Castellet de Banyoles Iberian village remains near Tivissa

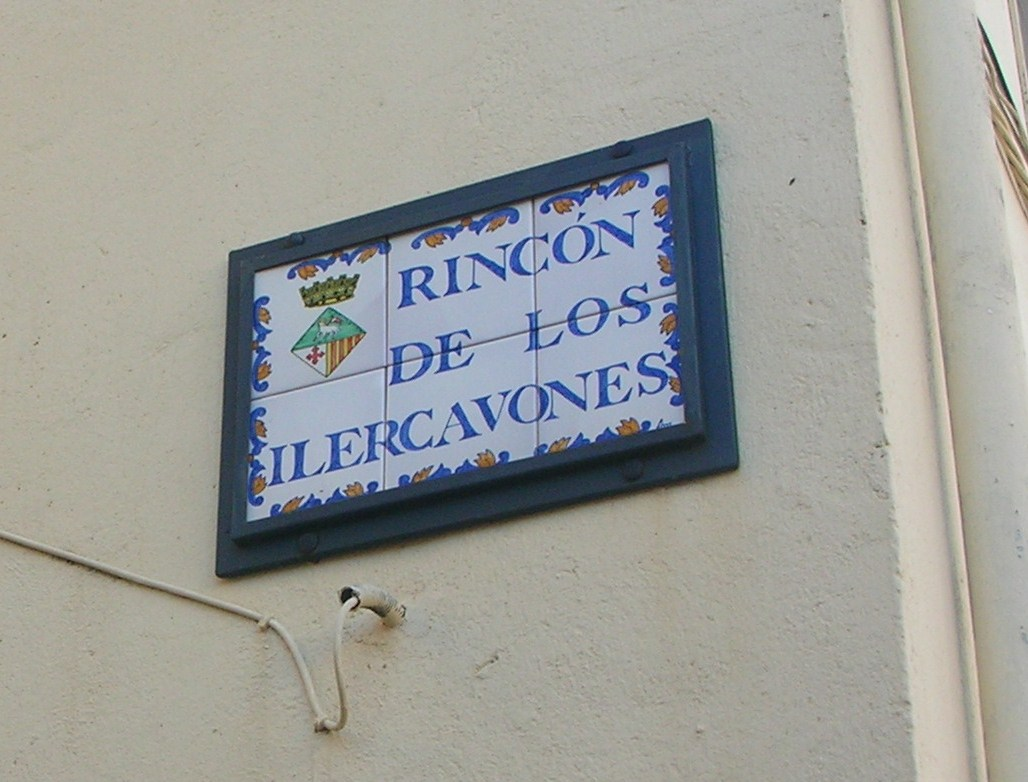
Name of a street in Queretes

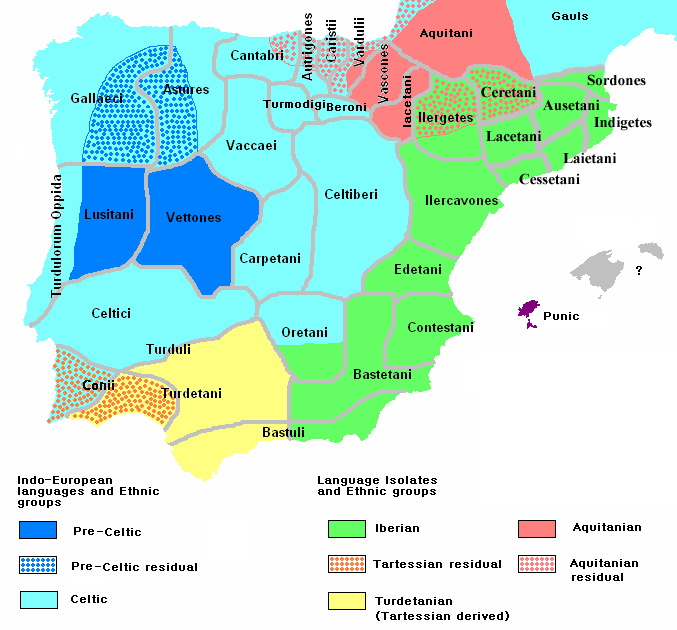
Ethnographic Iberia 200 BC

The Ilercavones were an ancient Iberian (Pre-Roman) people of the Iberian Peninsula (the Roman Hispania). They are believed to have spoken an Iberian language.

== History ==
The name Ilercavonia to refer to the territory occupied by this Iberian tribe appears in ancient Greek and Roman texts and documents and it was still mentioned in medieval texts. The northern limits of this territory were in Serra de la Llena, the northeastern in Coll de Balaguer, the western in Mequinensa and the southern in Sagunt.

The Ilercavones were very religious as a people. They did not have temples, but every mountain or hill was considered a sacred place. The Ilercavones as a nation or tribe were already mentioned by Pliny the Elder, who said that they inhabited the lands between river Udiva (possibly the Millars River) and further north of the Ebro, and by Ptolemy, who named the cape and the harbor where they lived Tenebri (possibly Orpesa). They were mentioned as well as by Livy in his texts describing the first phase of the Roman invasion of Iberia.

After the Roman conquest the Ilercavones became romanized, much like the other Iberian tribes in the peninsula. Gradually, they became assimilated into the Roman population, especially after acquiring the Latin language as their own vernacular.

== Archaeological sites ==
The most important archaeological sites are in the following places:

- Castellet de Banyoles in Tivissa
- Coll del Moro in Gandesa
- Below the Castle of La Suda in Tortosa
- Mianes in Tortosa
- Below the Templar castle in Miravet
- La Ferradura in Ulldecona
- Moleta del Remei in Alcanar
- Puig de la Nau in Benicarló
- Sant Antoni Iberian village in Calaceite

== See also ==
- Ilercavonia
- Iberians
- Pre-Roman peoples of the Iberian Peninsula
- Romanization (cultural)

== Bibliography ==
- Ángel Montenegro et alii, Historia de España 2 - colonizaciones y formación de los pueblos prerromanos (1200-218 a.C), Editorial Gredos, Madrid (1989) ISBN 84-249-1386-8
