= 945 Barcelona =

Main-belt asteroid

Discovery
- Discovered by: J. Comas Solà
- Discovery site: Barcelona
- Discovery date: 3 February 1921

Designations
- Alternative designations: 1921 JB

Orbital characteristics
- Epoch 31 July 2016 (JD 2457600.5)
- Uncertainty parameter 0
- Observation arc: 92.54 yr (33802 days)
- Aphelion: 3.0656 AU (458.61 Gm)
- Perihelion: 2.2037 AU (329.67 Gm)
- Semi-major axis: 2.6347 AU (394.15 Gm)
- Eccentricity: 0.16357
- Orbital period (sidereal): 4.28 yr (1562.0 d)
- Mean anomaly: 115.327°
- Mean motion: 0° 13^{m} 49.692^{s} / day
- Inclination: 32.896°
- Longitude of ascending node: 318.298°
- Argument of perihelion: 162.067°

Physical characteristics
- Mean radius: 12.735±0.6 km
- Synodic rotation period: 7.36 h (0.307 d)
- Geometric albedo: 0.2416±0.024
- Absolute magnitude (H): 10.13

945 Barcelona is a minor planet orbiting the Sun in the Asteroid belt. It was discovered 3 February 1921 from Barcelona by the Catalan astronomer Josep Comas i Solà (1868–1937) and named for the city of Barcelona (Spain), the birthplace of the discoverer. It has an estimated diameter of 25.5 km.

This object is the namesake of a Barcelona family of approximately 300 stony asteroids that share similar spectral properties and orbital elements; hence they may have arisen from the same collisional event. All members have a relatively high orbital inclination.
