= Tivissa =

- Municipality
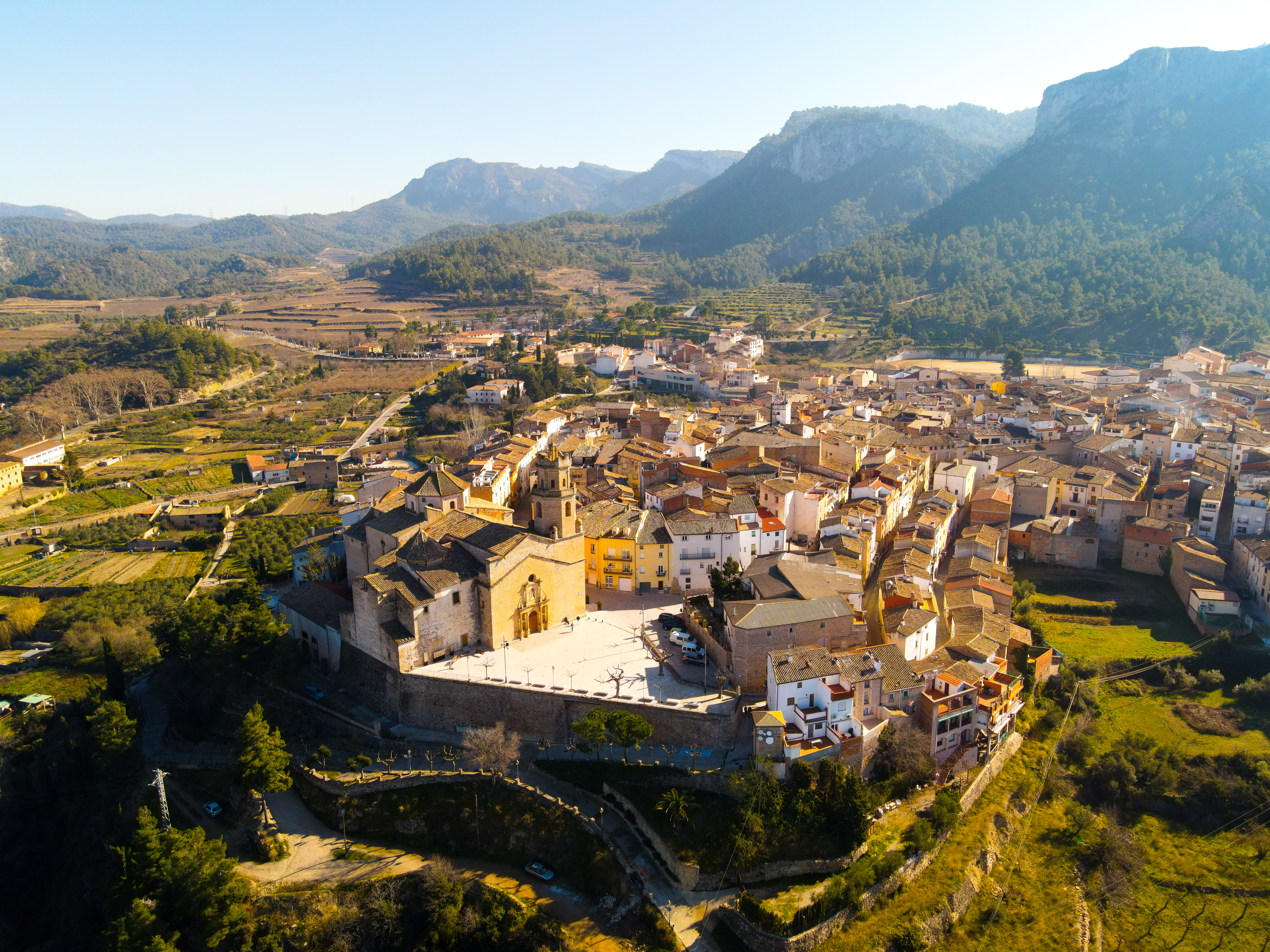
- Tivissa from the air

- Coat of arms

- Location in Catalonia
- Coordinates: 41°2′37″N 0°44′3″E
- Country: Spain
- Community: Catalonia
- Province: Tarragona
- Comarca: Ribera d'Ebre

Government
  - Mayor: Joan Cedó Sans (2025)

Area
  - Total: 209.4 km^{2} (80.8 sq mi)
- Elevation: 309 m (1,014 ft)

Population (2025-01-01)
  - Total: 1,658
  - Density: 7.918/km^{2} (20.51/sq mi)
- Demonym: Tivissà
- Postal code: 43746
- Website: www.tivissa.cat

Tivissa (Catalan pronunciation: [tiˈβisa]) is a municipality in the comarca of Ribera d'Ebre, Catalonia, Spain. It has a population of 1,658 (register office, 2025).

It is located below the La Llena massif. As well as the village of Tivissa itself, the municipality also includes the village of La Serra d'Almos, at the feet of the Montalt mountains, and the hamlets of Darmós and Llaberia.

== History ==
The area was settled in prehistoric times, and cave paintings have been discovered in several sites near the village.

In Iberian times, Tivissa was an important community, and the name itself may be of Iberian origin. There are the remains of an Iberian settlement at Banyoles, some five kilometres from the modern village and overlooking the Ebre river. The importance of these settlements was surely related to their position on the route through the pass of Coll de Fatxes, leading from the coast of Tarragona to what is now Zaragoza.

In the Roman period, amphorae made in Tivissa made their way as far as Rome itself, presumably to transport olive oil or wine. In the Middle Ages it was home to a castle, and about 1350 Tivissa became a walled settlement. Some remains of these walls can still be seen, particularly the gateways of Portal de l'Era, Portal d'Avall and Portal de la Raval, as well as of the castle.

On 4 August 1939, Tivissa was the site of Spain's first fatal airliner accident. The Hans Wende, a Junkers Ju 52/3mte (D-AUJG) of Deutsche Lufthansa, crashed into the Llaberia mountains near Tivissa en route from Toulouse to Casablanca, killing all 7 occupants.

== Main sights ==
Tivissa's main church has a 19th-century Renaissance-style appearance, but the interior is in Gothic style.

The church was built on the site of an earlier Romanesque building in the 13th-14th centuries, and various additions and alterations were made in the 16th to 18th centuries. The octagonal bell-tower was built in 1550. During the 19th century the rector Pere Rius started to plan a larger building, and received the support of the local council and of the president of the First Spanish Republic, Estanislau Figueres, who had connections with Tivissa. Because of the lack of available space, it was decided to build the new church on the same site. It was constructed around the old church with the intention of subsequently demolishing the old building. However, when the rector died in 1894 the work came to an end and the demolition never took place, thus leaving the Gothic church standing within the new one.

=== Castellet de Banyoles (Tivissa) ===
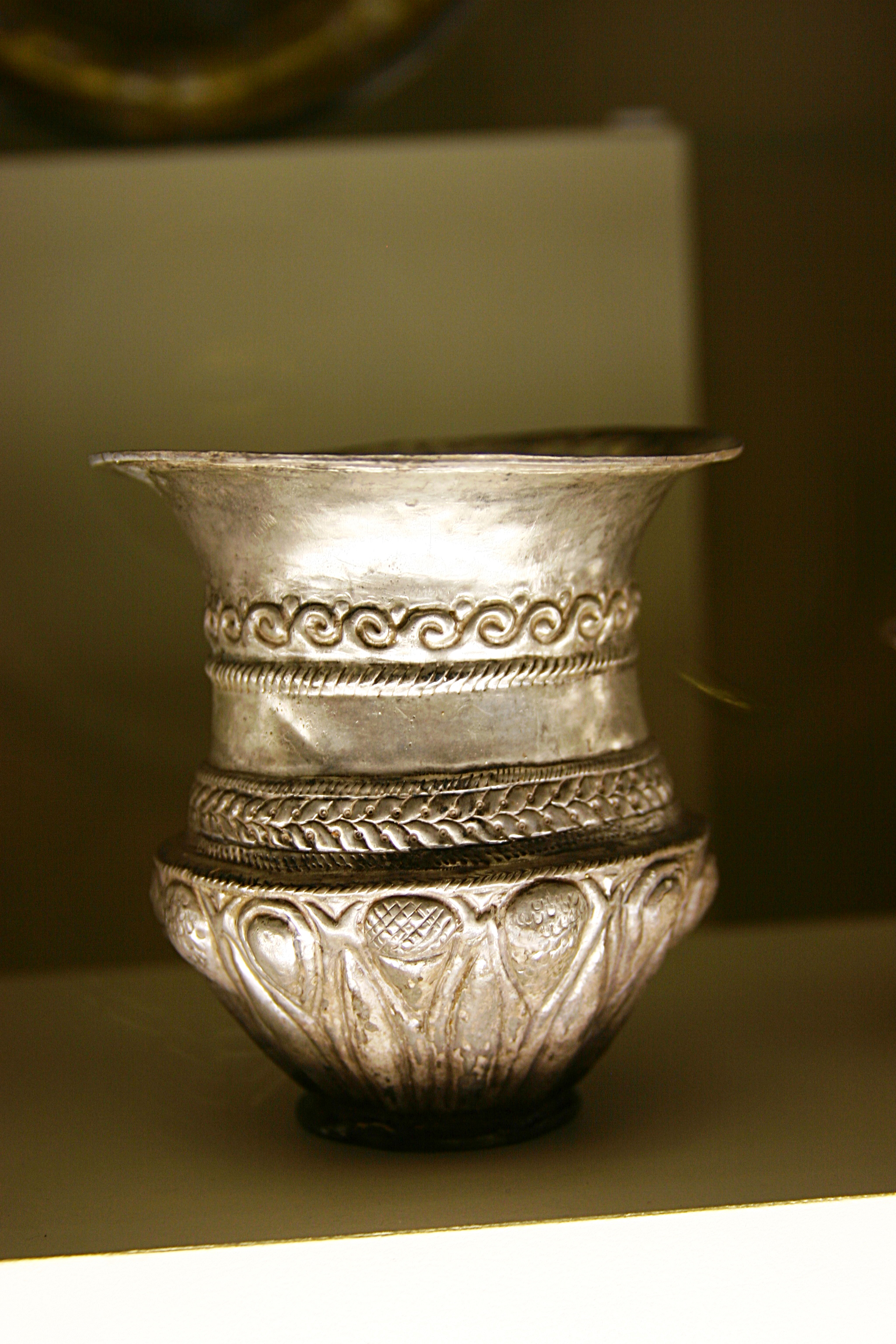
Ancient silver vessel from the Tivissa Treasure, c. 500 BC. Archaeology Museum of Catalonia

One of the most important ancient Iberian settlements of Catalonia was discovered here in 1912. Also, the 'Treasure of Tivissa', a unique collection of silver Iberian votive offerings was found in 1927.

The Iberian settlement occupies 4.4 hectares on the left side of the River Ebre. It was established between the 4th and the 6th centuries BC, or perhaps even earlier. This would have been the location controlling the trade to the interior along the river.

Classical writers described the area as belonging to the tribe of the Ilercavones. The Roman expansion into the area may have put an end to the settlement.

== Economy ==
In modern times, the economy is still largely based on agricultural activities, although the steep, marginal land in the hills has progressively gone out of cultivation. The chief crops are olives, grapes for wine, nuts (hazelnuts, almonds) and soft fruit (peaches, cherries). In recent years, tourism has been encouraged and is beginning to make an economic impact.

Close to the hamlet of Llaberia, the Catalan Institut Nacional de Meteorologia has installed a weather radar.

== Bibliography ==
- Tivissa, Tivissa Municipal Council publication, n.d.
- Dues Esglésies, Tivissa Municipal Council publication, n.d.
- Origen dels noms geogràfics de Catalunya, Manuel Bofarull i Terrades. Editorial Milà, Barcelona, 1991
