= Serra de Llaberia =

Mountain chain in Catalonia, Spain

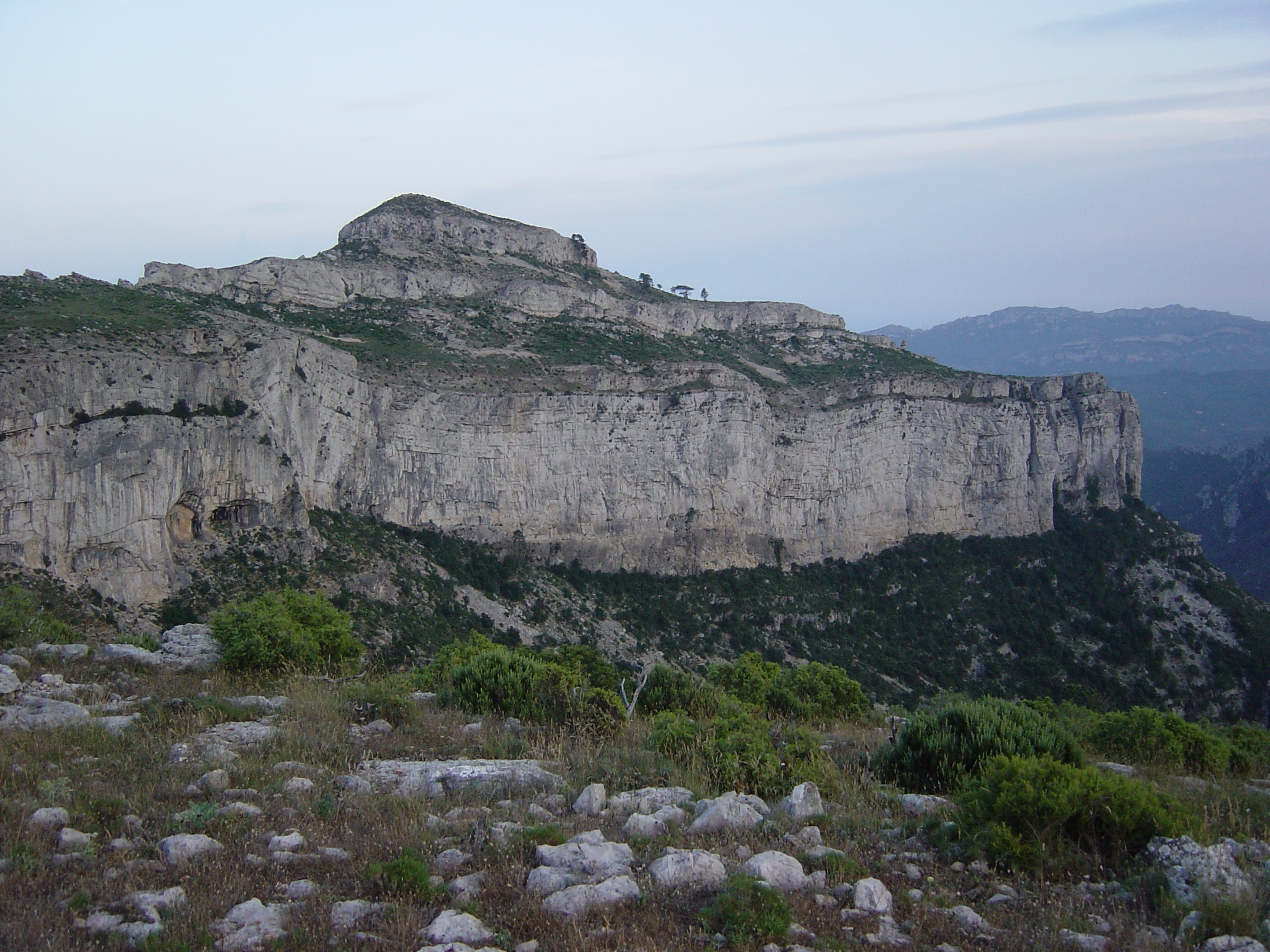
- View of Mont-redon's massive karstic cliffs

Highest point
- Elevation: 918.3 m (3,013 ft)
- Coordinates: 41°5′23″N 0°51′54″E

Geography
- Location within Catalonia
- Location: Baix Camp & Ribera d'Ebre, (Catalonia)
- Parent range: Catalan Pre-Coastal Range

Geology
- Mountain type: Karstic

Climbing
- First ascent: Unknown
- Easiest route: From Fatges or Tivissa

Serra de Llaberia is a mountain chain in Catalonia, Spain located between the Prades and the Tivissa-Vandellòs Mountains.

It is part of the Catalan Pre-Coastal Range. The main peaks are Mola de Llaberia (918.3 m), La Miranda (918 m) and Mont-redon (864 m).

This mountain range is named after Llaberia village, now a town within the Tivissa municipal term. The Serra de Montalt mountain range is a subrange of the main Llaberia range.

== See also ==
- Montalt
- Catalan Pre-Coastal Range
- Mountains of Catalonia
