= Josep Comas i Solà =

Spanish astronomer

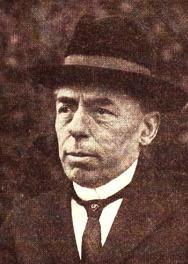
Josep Comas i Solà

Asteroids discovered: 11
| 804 Hispania | March 20, 1915 |
| 925 Alphonsina | January 13, 1920 |
| 945 Barcelona | February 3, 1921 |
| 986 Amelia | October 19, 1922 |
| 1102 Pepita | November 5, 1928 |
| 1117 Reginita | May 24, 1927 |
| 1136 Mercedes | October 30, 1929 |
| 1188 Gothlandia | September 30, 1930 |
| 1626 Sadeya | January 10, 1927 |
| 1655 Comas Solà | November 28, 1929 |
| 1708 Pólit | December 1, 1929 |

Josep Comas i Solà (Catalan pronunciation: [ʒuˈzɛp ˈkoməz i suˈla]; Barcelona 17 December 1868 – 2 December 1937) was a Spanish (Catalan) astronomer, discoverer of minor planets, comets, and double stars.

He wrote his first astronomy notes at the age of ten, and was only fifteen when he published an article in a French specialist magazine.

He observed planets including Mars and Saturn, measuring the rotation period of the latter. He wrote some books popularizing astronomy, and was first president of the Spanish and American Astronomical Society (Spanish: Sociedad Astrónomica de España y América; S.A.D.E.Y.A.). He discovered the periodic comet 32P/Comas Solà, and co-discovered the non-periodic comet C/1925 F1 (Shajn-Comas Solà); he is also credited by the Minor Planet Center with the discovery of 11 asteroids during 1915–1930. Comas i Solà is also credited with the discovery of the double star SOL 1.

In 1905, Solà received the Prix Jules Janssen, the highest award of the Société astronomique de France, the French astronomical society. In 1908 he claimed to observe limb darkening of Saturn's moon Titan, the first evidence that the body had an atmosphere. He was the head of Fabra Observatory since it was established in 1904.

The asteroids 1102 Pepita (from his nickname Pepito) and 1655 Comas Solà are named after him, as is Comas Sola crater on Mars.
