= Fatges =

Coordinates: 41°01′56″N 00°47′46″E

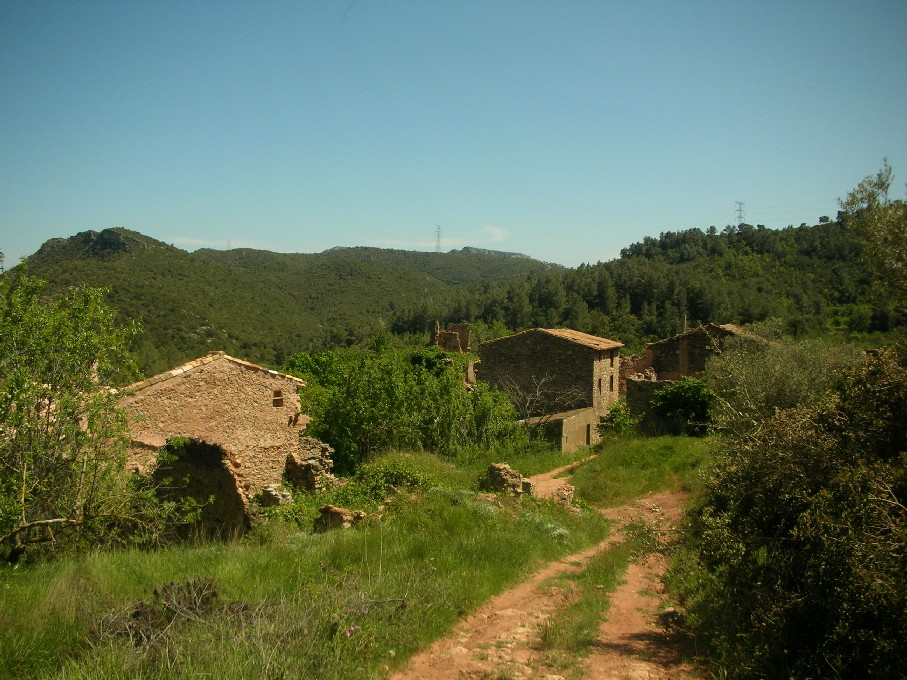
Western entrance to Fatges village from the access road

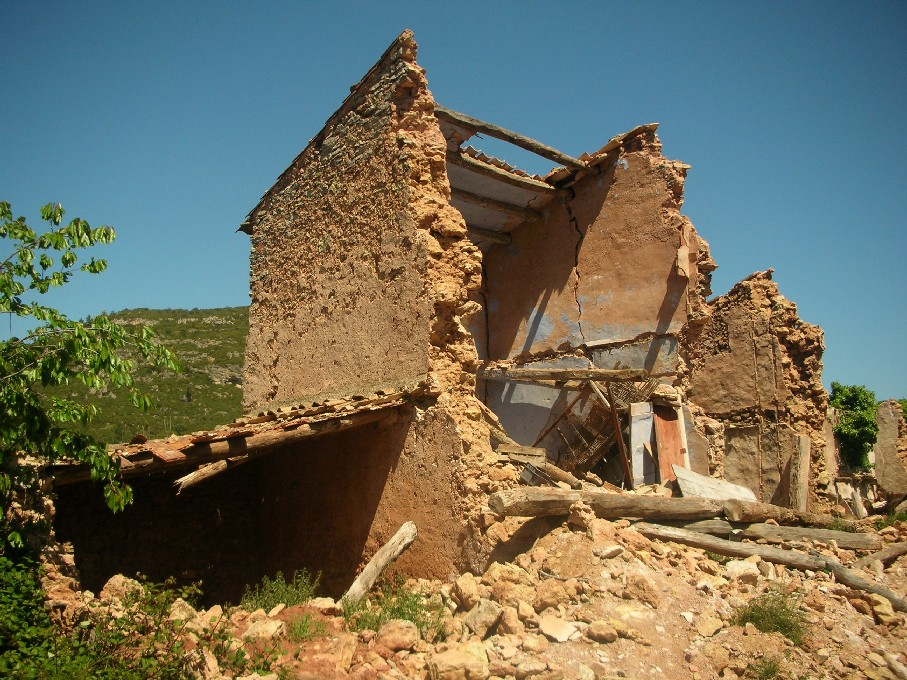
Some of the ruined houses in Fatges

Fatges or Fatxes is a ghost town located in the Baix Camp comarca, Catalonia, Spain. It is located 4,5 km to the northeast of Vandellòs town, surrounded by the Tivissa-Vandellós Mountains, within the Vandellòs i l'Hospitalet de l'Infant municipality limits.

== History and description ==
The village was abandoned in the middle of the 20th century. Local legend says that people left in a hurry after certain assassinations were committed in the place. Since the true facts are clouded in mystery, people of the area consider Fatges an accursed place that should be avoided.

In 2001, a Japanese-sponsored project rebuilt some village houses that were in ruins. Presently, though, only one of the houses is in good condition, the remaining buildings are in different states of decay and ruin.
