= 32P/Comas Solà =

Jupiter-family comet

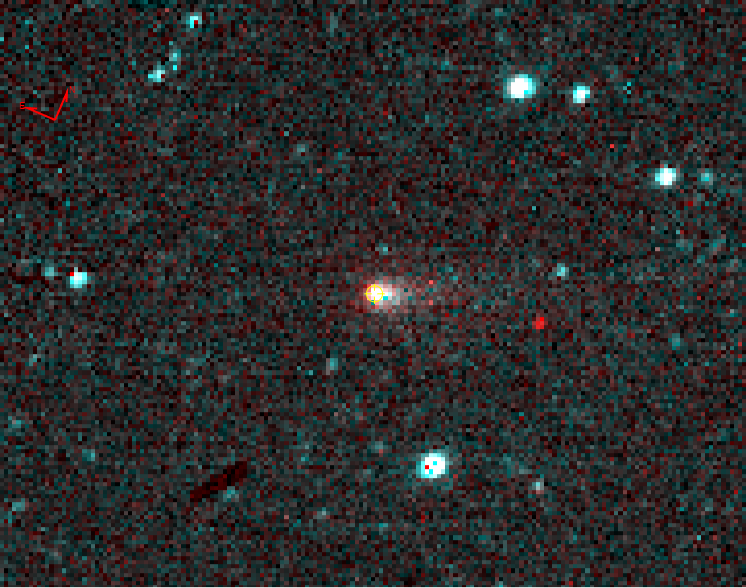
- Infrared image of Comet Comas Solà taken by NEOWISE on 4 December 2014

Discovery
- Discovered by: Josep Comas i Solà
- Discovery site: Fabra Observatory
- Discovery date: 4 November 1926

Designations
- MPC designation: P/1926 V1, P/1935 P1
- Alternative designations: 1927 III, 1935 IV, 1944 II; 1961 III, 1969 VIII; 1978 XVII, 1987 XVIII

Orbital characteristics
- Epoch: 5 May 2025 (JD 2460800.5)
- Observation arc: 98.58 years (Note: Observation arc from the Minor Planet Center database covering dates from 4 November 1926 until 4 June 2025.)
- Number of observations: 5,528
- Aphelion: 7.082 AU
- Perihelion: 2.025 AU
- Semi-major axis: 4.554 AU
- Eccentricity: 0.55529
- Orbital period: 9.718 years
- Inclination: 9.920°
- Longitude of ascending node: 54.532°
- Argument of periapsis: 54.703°
- Mean anomaly: 38.473°
- Last perihelion: 20 April 2024
- Next perihelion: 15 January 2034
- T_{Jupiter}: 2.678
- Earth MOID: 1.029 AU
- Jupiter MOID: 0.247 AU

Physical characteristics
- Mean radius: 2.52 km (1.57 mi)
- Mean density: 580±90 kg/m^{3}
- Synodic rotation period: 7.3 hours
- Comet total magnitude (M1): 10.3
- Comet nuclear magnitude (M2): 13.5

32P/Comas Solà is a Jupiter-family comet with a current orbital period of 9.7 years around the Sun. It is the second of two comets discovered by Spanish astronomer, Josep Comas Solà. (Note: Josep Comas Solà independently co-discovered C/1925 F1 (Shajn–Comas Solá) over a year earlier with Grigory Shajn.)

== Observational history ==
The comet was discovered on 4 November 1926, by Josep Comas Solà. As part of his work on asteroids for the Fabra Observatory (Barcelona), he was taking photographs with a 6-inch (150 mm) telescope. At the time, its position was located within the constellation Cetus. (Note: Reported initial position upon discovery was: α = 2^{h} 56^{m} 36^{s}, δ = –6° 31′) The comet's past orbital evolution became a point of interest as several astronomers suggested early on that the comet might be a return of the then lost periodic comet 113P/Spitaler. In 1935, additional positions had been obtained, and P. Ramensky investigated the orbital motion back to 1911. He noted the comet passed very close to Jupiter during May 1912 and that, prior to this approach, the comet had a perihelion distance of 2.15 AU (322 million km) and an orbital period of 9.43 years. The identity with Comet Spitaler was thus disproven.

In 1933, the Danish astronomer Julie Vinter Hansen undertook significant new research which calculated the orbit of the comet up to 1980, predicting when it would return to the Earth's orbit.

While searching for 32P/Comas Solà in 1969, two Soviet astronomers Klim Churyumov and Svetlana Gerasimenko accidentally discovered a new comet in photographic plates they took, which is now known as 67P/Churyumov–Gerasimenko.

== Physical characteristics ==
=== Nucleus size ===
In 1985, precession models of the comet's nucleus derived an equatorial radius somewhere between 0.99–1.15 km (0.62–0.71 mi). CCD photometry of the comet taken while it was 3.1 AU (460 million km) from the Sun in 1999 obtained a larger upper limit about 3.2 km (2.0 mi). Further studies in 2006 revised the size estimate to be about 2.52 km (1.57 mi).

=== Rotation period ===
Initial estimates of the rotation period indicated that the comet spins around its axis once every 1.5 to 2.3 days. However, based on the 1999 estimate of the size of its nucleus, forced precession models obtained in 2001 indicated a shorter rotation period of around 7.3 hours.

== Notes ==
Numbered comets
Previous; 31P/Schwassmann–Wachmann	32P/Comas Solà	Next; 33P/Daniel
