= Fabra Observatory =

Observatory in Barcelona, Spain

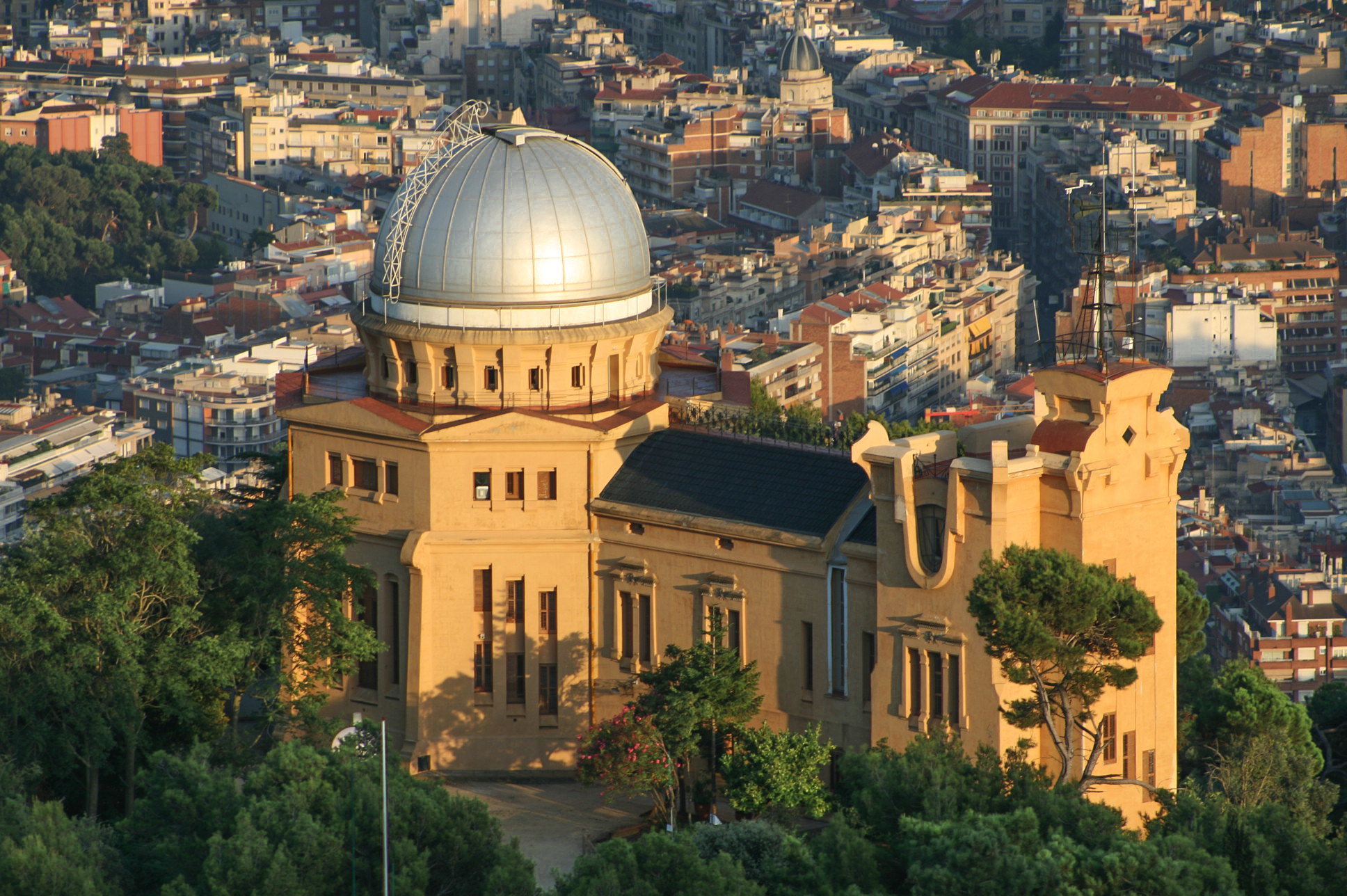
- Alternative names: Observatorio Fabra
- Named after: Camil Fabra i Fontanills
- Organization: Reial Acadèmia de Ciències i Arts de Barcelona
- Observatory code: 006
- Location: Barcelona, Catalonia, Spain, EU
- Coordinates: 41°25′06″N 2°07′27″E
- Established: 1904
- Website: fabra.cat

Telescopes
- Mailhat: Refracting telescope
- Baker-Nunn camera: Schmidt telescope
- Location of Fabra Observatory
- Related media on Commons

The Fabra Observatory (Catalan: Observatori Fabra, IPA: [upsəɾβəˈtɔɾi ˈfaβɾə]; obs. code: 006) is an astronomical observatory located in Barcelona, Catalonia, Spain pointed towards the south at 415 metres above sea level (latitude: 41,4184° N; longitude: 2,1239° E).

It was established in 1904 and belongs to the Royal Academy of Science and Arts of Barcelona (Catalan: Reial Acadèmia de Ciències i Arts de Barcelona). Its main activity is the study of asteroids and comets. It is the fourth oldest observatory in the world that is still functioning.

It is where the comet 32P/Comas Solà was discovered by Josep Comas Solà.

== Telescope ==
The double refractor was built by Mailhat, Paris, in 1904. The visual instrument (the lower of the two tubes) has an aperture of 38 cm and a focal length of 6 meters (f/15.8). The photographic instrument also has an aperture of 38 cm, but a shorter focal length of 4 meters (f/10.5).

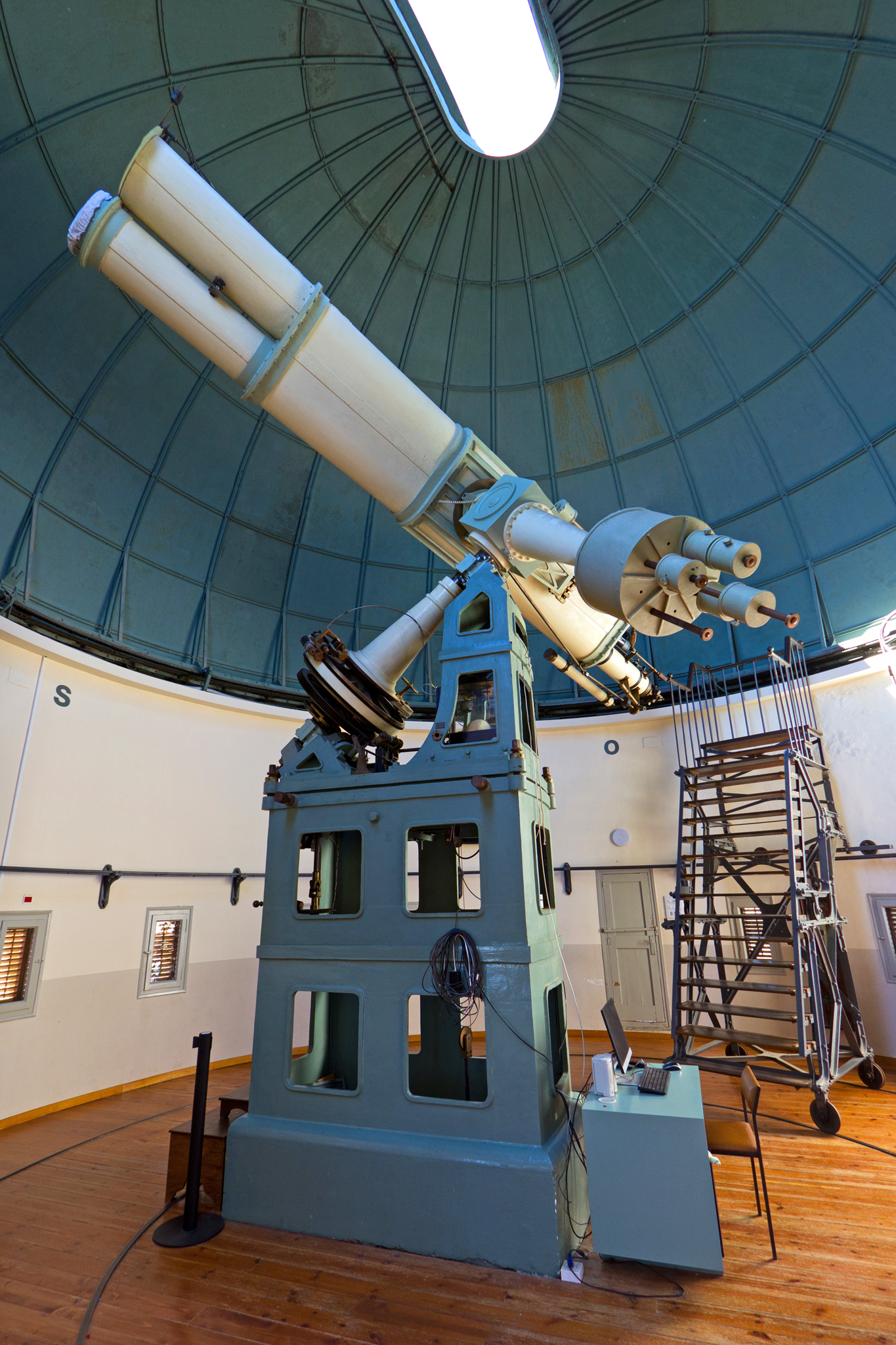
Mailhat telescope

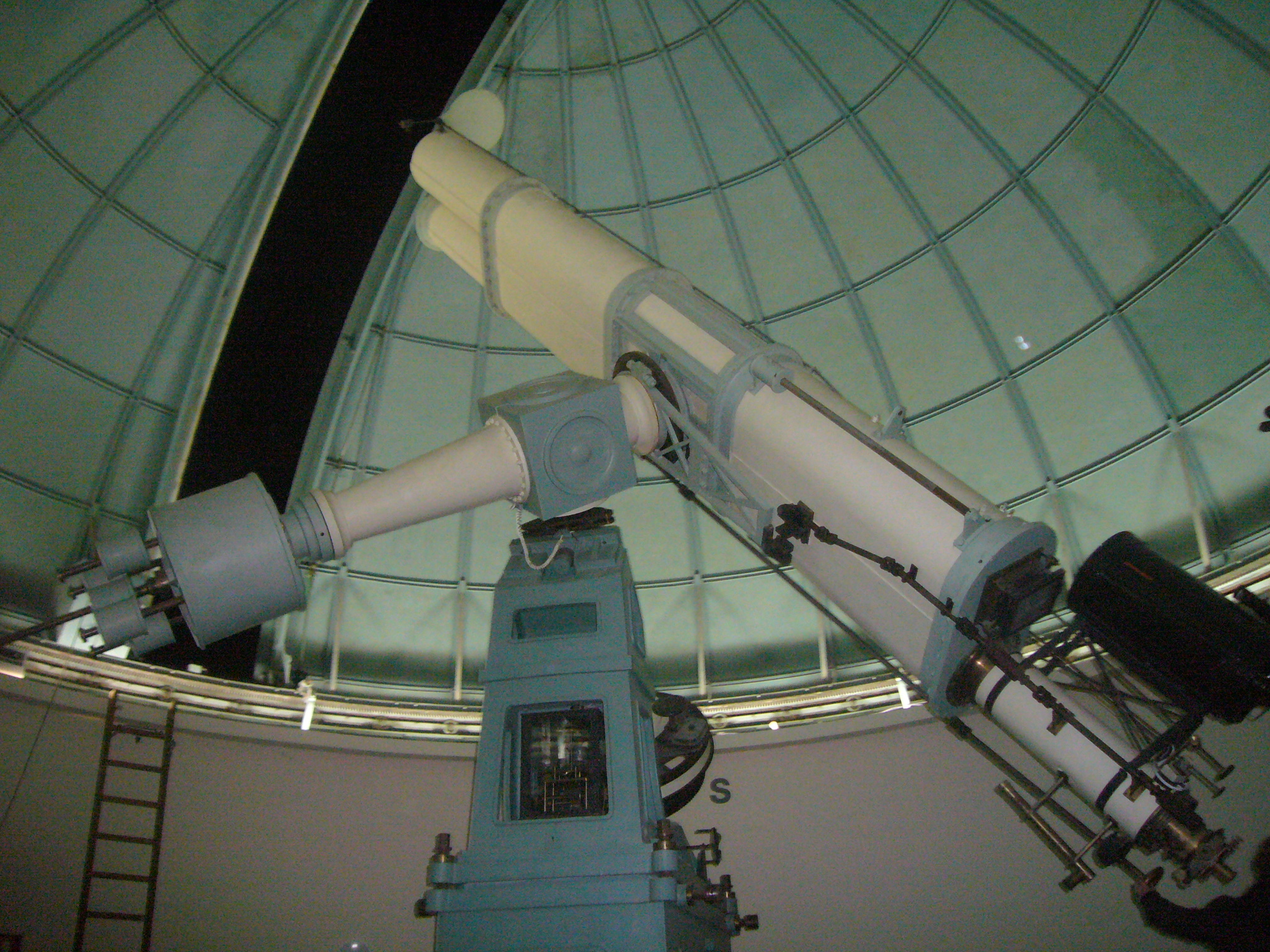
Mailhat refractor from 1904

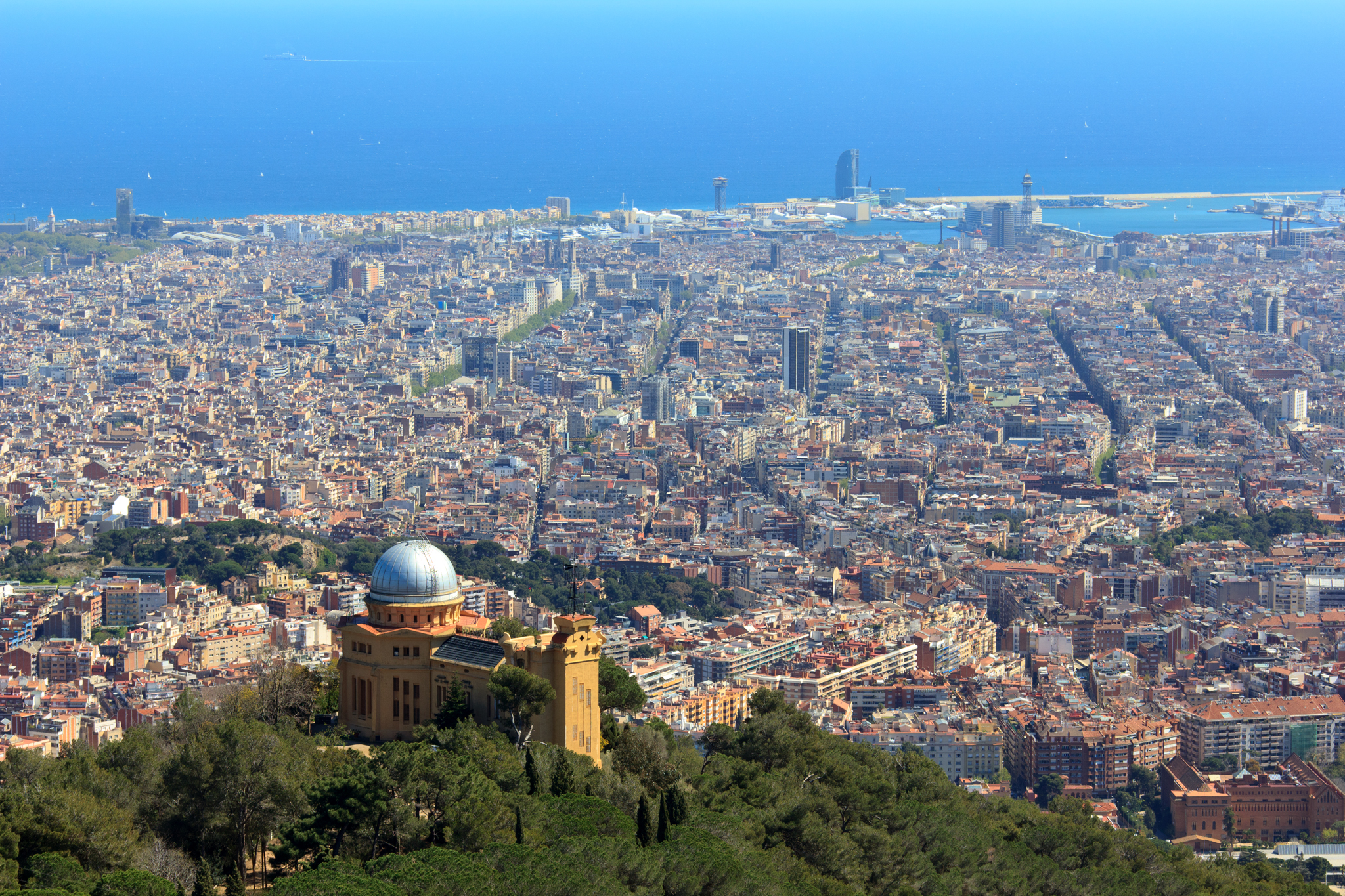
Fabra Observatory on the hill above the metropolis

== See also ==
- Ramón Jardí i Borrás
