= Hugh Rice =

Hugh Rice could refer to:

- Tom Rice (Hugh Thompson Rice Jr., born 1957), American politician
- Hugh Rice (astronomer), American museum director and amateur astronomer for whom the asteroid 1230 Riceia is named
