= Aethusa (disambiguation) =

Aethusa (Greek Aithusa) is a daughter of Poseidon and Alcyone in Greek mythology.

Aethusa may also refer to:

- 1064 Aethusa, a minor planet orbiting the Sun
- Aethusa (plant), a genus of annual herbs
