= 1220 Crocus =

Main-belt asteroid

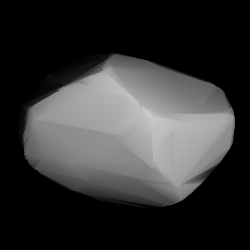
- Shape model of Crocus from its lightcurve

Discovery
- Discovered by: K. Reinmuth
- Discovery site: Heidelberg Obs.
- Discovery date: 11 February 1932

Designations
- Pronunciation: /ˈkroʊkəs/
- Named after: Crocus
- Alternative designations: 1932 CU · 1955 PC
- Minor planet category: main-belt · Eos

Orbital characteristics
- Epoch 4 September 2017 (JD 2458000.5)
- Uncertainty parameter 0
- Observation arc: 85.31 yr (31,161 days)
- Aphelion: 3.2243 AU
- Perihelion: 2.7807 AU
- Semi-major axis: 3.0025 AU
- Eccentricity: 0.0739
- Orbital period (sidereal): 5.20 yr (1,900 days)
- Mean anomaly: 204.16°
- Mean motion: 0° 11^{m} 21.84^{s} / day
- Inclination: 11.365°
- Longitude of ascending node: 113.34°
- Argument of perihelion: 333.41°

Physical characteristics
- Dimensions: 17.866±0.175
- Synodic rotation period: 491.4±0.1
- Geometric albedo: 0.114±0.020
- Spectral type: S
- Absolute magnitude (H): 11.72

1220 Crocus, provisionally designated 1932 CU, is a stony Eoan asteroid and slow rotator from the outer regions of the asteroid belt, approximately 17 kilometers in diameter. It was discovered on 11 February 1932, by German astronomer Karl Reinmuth at Heidelberg Observatory in southwest Germany.

== Orbit and classification ==
Crocus is a member of the Eos family, a collisional population of mostly stony composition. It orbits the Sun at a distance of 2.8–3.2 AU once every 5 years and 2 months (1,900 days). Its orbit has an eccentricity of 0.07 and an inclination of 11° with respect to the ecliptic. A

== Physical characteristics ==
The asteroid has been characterized as a stony S-type asteroid.

In December 2014, a rotational lightcurve of Crocus was obtained from photometric observations by an international collaboration of several astronomers from Europe and the United States. Lightcurve analysis gave a long rotation period of 491 hours with a brightness variation of 1.00 magnitude (U=3).

== Naming ==
This minor planet was later named after the genus of flowering plants, Crocus, in the iris family.
