= 1060 Magnolia =

Main-belt asteroid

Discovery
- Discovered by: K. Reinmuth
- Discovery site: Heidelberg Obs.
- Discovery date: 13 August 1925

Designations
- Pronunciation: /mæɡˈnoʊliə/
- Named after: Magnolia (flowering plant)
- Alternative designations: 1925 PA · 1945 OA
- Minor planet category: main-belt · (inner); Flora

Orbital characteristics
- Epoch 4 September 2017 (JD 2458000.5)
- Uncertainty parameter 0
- Observation arc: 92.29 yr (33,709 days)
- Aphelion: 2.6902 AU
- Perihelion: 1.7844 AU
- Semi-major axis: 2.2373 AU
- Eccentricity: 0.2024
- Orbital period (sidereal): 3.35 yr (1,222 days)
- Mean anomaly: 192.34°
- Mean motion: 0° 17^{m} 40.2^{s} / day
- Inclination: 5.9191°
- Longitude of ascending node: 221.13°
- Argument of perihelion: 84.766°

Physical characteristics
- Dimensions: 5.23±0.58 km 6.844±0.056 km 7.110±0.117 km 7.16 km 9.65±0.60 km
- Synodic rotation period: 2.78±0.05 h 2.910±0.001 h 2.9107±0.0001 h 2.9108±0.0005 h 2.911±0.0008 h 3.08±0.01 h
- Geometric albedo: 0.173±0.034; 0.2839; 0.2922±0.0328; 0.47±0.13
- Spectral type: S
- Absolute magnitude (H): 12.07±0.89 · 12.264±0.002 (R) · 12.60 · 12.7 · 12.71 · 12.71±0.06 · 12.97

1060 Magnolia, provisional designation 1925 PA, is a stony Florian asteroid from the inner regions of the asteroid belt, approximately 7 kilometers in diameter. It was discovered on 13 August 1925, by German astronomer Karl Reinmuth at the Heidelberg-Königstuhl State Observatory. The asteroid was named after the flowering plant magnolia.

== Orbit and classification ==
Magnolia is a member of the Flora family (402), a giant asteroid family and the largest family of stony asteroids in the main-belt. It orbits the Sun in the inner asteroid belt at a distance of 1.8–2.7 AU once every 3 years and 4 months (1,222 days; semi-major axis of 2.24 AU). Its orbit has an eccentricity of 0.20 and an inclination of 6° with respect to the ecliptic.

The body's observation arc begins at Heidelberg in September 1925, or one month after its official discovery observation.

== Physical characteristics ==
Pan-STARRS' photometric survey characterizes Magnolia as a common, stony S-type asteroid, which is also the overall spectral type for members of the Flora family.

=== Rotation period ===
Several rotational lightcurves of Magnolia have been obtained from photometric observations since 1992. The best-rated lightcurve by French amateur astronomers Jacques Michelet and Maurice Audejean gave a relatively short rotation period of 2.9107 hours with a brightness amplitude of 0.14 magnitude (U=3).

=== Diameter and albedo ===
According to the survey carried out by the NEOWISE mission of NASA's Wide-field Infrared Survey Explorer (WISE), Magnolia measures between 5.23 and 9.65 kilometers in diameter and its surface has an albedo between 0.173 and 0.47.

The Collaborative Asteroid Lightcurve Link adopts Petr Pravec's revised WISE results, that is, an albedo of 0.2839 and a diameter of 7.16 kilometers based on an absolute magnitude of 12.71.

== Naming ==
This minor planet was named after a genus of flowering plants, magnolia, which was in turn named after Pierre Magnol. The official naming citation was mentioned in The Names of the Minor Planets by Paul Herget in 1955 (H 101).

=== Reinmuth's flowers ===
Due to his many discoveries, Karl Reinmuth submitted a large list of 66 newly named asteroids in the early 1930s. The list covered his discoveries with numbers between (1009) and (1200). This list also contained a sequence of 28 asteroids, starting with 1054 Forsytia, that were all named after plants, in particular flowering plants (also see list of minor planets named after animals and plants).
