= 1218 Aster =

Main-belt asteroid

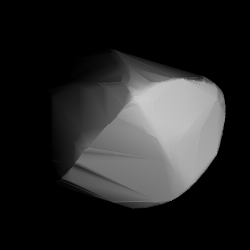
- Shape model of Aster from its lightcurve

Discovery
- Discovered by: K. Reinmuth
- Discovery site: Heidelberg Obs.
- Discovery date: 29 January 1932

Designations
- Pronunciation: /ˈæstər/
- Named after: Aster (genus of flowers)
- Alternative designations: 1932 BJ · 1978 TJ_{5} 1978 VQ_{12}
- Minor planet category: main-belt · (inner)

Orbital characteristics
- Epoch 4 September 2017 (JD 2458000.5)
- Uncertainty parameter 0
- Observation arc: 85.35 yr (31,173 days)
- Aphelion: 2.5110 AU
- Perihelion: 2.0158 AU
- Semi-major axis: 2.2634 AU
- Eccentricity: 0.1094
- Orbital period (sidereal): 3.41 yr (1,244 days)
- Mean anomaly: 56.714°
- Mean motion: 0° 17^{m} 21.84^{s} / day
- Inclination: 3.1572°
- Longitude of ascending node: 63.820°
- Argument of perihelion: 69.372°

Physical characteristics
- Dimensions: 5.554±0.084 km
- Geometric albedo: 0.332±0.043
- Absolute magnitude (H): 13.2

1218 Aster, provisional designation 1932 BJ, is a bright asteroid from the inner regions of the asteroid belt, approximately 5.5 kilometers in diameter. Discovered by Karl Reinmuth in 1932, it was later named after the flowering plant Aster.

== Discovery ==
Aster was discovered on 29 January 1932, by German astronomer Karl Reinmuth at Heidelberg Observatory in southern Germany. Two nights later, it was independently discovered by Italian astronomer Mario A. Ferrero at the Pino Torinese Observatory at Turin, Italy.

== Classification and orbit ==
Aster orbits the Sun in the inner main-belt at a distance of 2.0–2.5 AU once every 3 years and 5 months (1,244 days). Its orbit has an eccentricity of 0.11 and an inclination of 3° with respect to the ecliptic.

The asteroid's observation arc begins at the discovering observatory, one week after its official discovery observation.

== Physical characteristics ==
=== Diameter and albedo ===
According to the survey carried out by the NEOWISE mission of NASA's Wide-field Infrared Survey Explorer, Aster measures 5.554 kilometers in diameter and its surface has an albedo of 0.332.

=== Lightcurves ===
As of 2017, rotational lightcurve of Aster has been obtained. The body's rotation period, shape and variation in magnitude shifted from unknown movements to specific identifiable spin/shape determinations.

== Naming ==
The minor planet was named after the genus of flowers, Aster (also see List of minor planets named after animals and plants § Plants). The official naming citation was mentioned in The Names of the Minor Planets by Paul Herget in 1955 (H 113).
