= 1142 Aetolia =

Main-belt asteroid

Discovery
- Discovered by: K. Reinmuth
- Discovery site: Heidelberg Obs.
- Discovery date: 24 January 1930

Designations
- Pronunciation: /iːˈtoʊliə/
- Named after: Aetolia (Greek region)
- Alternative designations: 1930 BC · 1931 LC; 1937 LN · 1937 LU; 1942 GF · 1942 GS; 1943 PF · 1948 JS; 1948 KG · 1954 KJ; 1954 MU · 1958 BB; A902 GB · A907 CB; A908 GB
- Minor planet category: main-belt · (outer)

Orbital characteristics
- Epoch 4 September 2017 (JD 2458000.5)
- Uncertainty parameter 0
- Observation arc: 115.24 yr (42,093 days)
- Aphelion: 3.4423 AU
- Perihelion: 2.9265 AU
- Semi-major axis: 3.1844 AU
- Eccentricity: 0.0810
- Orbital period (sidereal): 5.68 yr (2,076 days)
- Mean anomaly: 90.209°
- Mean motion: 0° 10^{m} 24.24^{s} / day
- Inclination: 2.1096°
- Longitude of ascending node: 139.34°
- Argument of perihelion: 96.492°

Physical characteristics
- Dimensions: 22.135±0.133 km 23.764±0.124 km 24.92±1.57 km 27.10 km (calculated)
- Synodic rotation period: 7.68±0.12 h 10.730±0.005 h 10.74±0.02 h
- Geometric albedo: 0.20 (assumed); 0.216±0.029; 0.2439±0.0610; 0.273±0.034
- Spectral type: S
- Absolute magnitude (H): 9.95±0.07 (R) · 10.2 · 10.30 · 10.35±0.29

1142 Aetolia, provisional designation 1930 BC, is a stony background asteroid from the outer region of the asteroid belt, approximately 24 kilometers in diameter. It was discovered on 24 January 1930, by German astronomer Karl Reinmuth at the Heidelberg-Königstuhl State Observatory and named for the Greek region Aetolia.

== Orbit and classification ==
Aetolia has not been associated with any known asteroid family. It orbits the Sun in the outer main-belt at a distance of 2.9–3.4 AU once every 5 years and 8 months (2,076 days). Its orbit has an eccentricity of 0.08 and an inclination of 2° with respect to the ecliptic.

The asteroid was first identified as A902 GB at Heidelberg in April 1902. The body's observation arc begins at the USNO in May 1908, or 22 years prior to its official discovery observation.

== Physical characteristics ==
Aetolia has been characterized as a common stony S-type asteroid by Pan-STARRS photometric survey.

=== Rotation period ===
In May 2010, two rotational lightcurves of Aetolia were independently obtained from photometric observations by French amateur astronomer René Roy and by Russell Durkee at the S.O.S. Observatory (H39) near Minneapolis, United States. Lightcurve analysis gave a rotation period of 10.730 and 10.74 hours with a brightness variation of 0.20 and 0.22 in magnitude, respectively (U=3-/3-). A more recent and lower-rated observation gave a divergent period of 7.68 hours (U=2).

=== Diameter and albedo ===
According to the surveys carried out by the Japanese Akari satellite and the NEOWISE mission of NASA's Wide-field Infrared Survey Explorer, Aetolia measures between 22.135 and 24.92 kilometers in diameter and its surface has an albedo between 0.216 and 0.273.

The Collaborative Asteroid Lightcurve Link assumes a standard albedo for stony asteroids of 0.20 and calculates a diameter of 27.10 kilometers based on an absolute magnitude of 10.2.

== Naming ==
This minor planet was named after the Greek region Aetolia, north of the Gulf of Patras. The official naming citation was mentioned in The Names of the Minor Planets by Paul Herget in 1955 (H 107).
