= 1216 Askania =

Main-belt asteroid

1216 (One after Magna Carta) Askania
Discovery
- Discovered by: K. Reinmuth
- Discovery site: Heidelberg Obs.
- Discovery date: 29 January 1932

Designations
- Named after: Askania Werke (German manufacturer)
- Alternative designations: 1932 BL · 1952 DH; 1984 YY_{6} · A909 GF
- Minor planet category: main-belt · (inner); Flora · background

Orbital characteristics
- Epoch 4 September 2017 (JD 2458000.5)
- Uncertainty parameter 0
- Observation arc: 110.32 yr (40,295 days)
- Aphelion: 2.6325 AU
- Perihelion: 1.8328 AU
- Semi-major axis: 2.2327 AU
- Eccentricity: 0.1791
- Orbital period (sidereal): 3.34 yr (1,219 days)
- Mean anomaly: 134.38°
- Mean motion: 0° 17^{m} 43.44^{s} / day
- Inclination: 7.5997°
- Longitude of ascending node: 121.60°
- Argument of perihelion: 144.64°

Physical characteristics
- Mean diameter: 7.21±0.38 km 9.62±2.53 km 10.08±0.54 km 10.533±0.089 km
- Synodic rotation period: 6.536±0.003 h
- Geometric albedo: 0.064±0.009; 0.070±0.008; 0.136±0.014; 0.15±0.09; 0.24 (assumed)
- Spectral type: Tholen = S · S B–V = 0.903
- Absolute magnitude (H): 13.49

1216 Askania, provisional designation 1932 BL, is a stony Florian asteroid from the inner regions of the asteroid belt, approximately 9 kilometers in diameter. It was discovered on 29 January 1932, by German astronomer Karl Reinmuth at Heidelberg Observatory in southwest Germany. It was named after the company Askania Werke, a German manufacturer of precision instruments.

== Orbit and classification ==
Askania orbits the Sun in the inner main-belt at a distance of 1.8–2.6 AU once every 3 years and 4 months (1,219 days). Its orbit has an eccentricity of 0.18 and an inclination of 8° with respect to the ecliptic. The asteroid is a member of the Flora family, one of the largest families in the asteroid belt. (Note: The Collaborative Asteroid Lightcurve Link groups any asteroid into the Flora family that has a semi-major axis, inclination and eccentricity in the following ranges: 2.15 < a < 2.35; 0.03 < e < 0.23: 1.5 < i < 8. However, modern synthetic clustering models exclude (1216) Askania from the Flora family, see AstDyS-2 and Nesvorny HCM Asteroid Families V3.0.) Conversely, it is considered a background asteroid when applying the hierarchical clustering method to it proper orbital elements.

The body's observation arc begins with its official discovery observation at Heidelberg in 1932. In July 1906, a first precovery was taken at the Lowell Observatory, and in April 1909, the asteroid was first identified at the discovering observatory as A909 GF.

== Naming ==
The minor planet was named after "Askania Werke AG", a manufacturer of optical and astronomical instruments in Berlin (also see Cinetheodolite). The company went on to develop the auto pilot of the V-1 bomb in the following years. The official naming citation was published by Paul Herget in The Names of the Minor Planets in 1955 (H 112).

== Physical characteristics ==
In the Tholen classification, Askania is a common stony S-type asteroid.

=== Lightcurves ===
Lightcurve observations of Askania at the Menke Observatory in July 2006, show a well-defined periodicity of 6.536 hours, during which time the brightness of the body varies by 0.30 magnitude (U=3-).

=== Diameter and albedo ===
According to the surveys carried out by the Japanese Akari satellite, and the NEOWISE mission of NASA's Wide-field Infrared Survey Explorer, Askania measures between 7.21 and 10.533 kilometers in diameter and its surface has an albedo between 0.064 and 0.15.

The Collaborative Asteroid Lightcurve Link assumes an albedo of 0.24 – derived from 8 Flora, an stony asteroid and largest member and namesake of the Flora family – and calculates a diameter of 5.44 kilometers with an absolute magnitude of 13.49.
