= 1156 Kira =

Stony background asteroid

Discovery
- Discovered by: K. Reinmuth
- Discovery site: Heidelberg Obs.
- Discovery date: 22 February 1928

Designations
- Named after: unknown
- Alternative designations: 1928 DA · 1935 FY; 1938 DA · 1953 RC_{1} 1955 FW_{1} · 1973 QC_{2}
- Minor planet category: main-belt · (inner) background

Orbital characteristics
- Epoch 4 September 2017 (JD 2458000.5)
- Uncertainty parameter 0
- Observation arc: 88.76 yr (32,418 days)
- Aphelion: 2.3414 AU
- Perihelion: 2.1329 AU
- Semi-major axis: 2.2372 AU
- Eccentricity: 0.0466
- Orbital period (sidereal): 3.35 yr (1,222 days)
- Mean anomaly: 326.67°
- Mean motion: 0° 17^{m} 40.2^{s} / day
- Inclination: 1.3976°
- Longitude of ascending node: 91.131°
- Argument of perihelion: 353.76°

Physical characteristics
- Dimensions: 6.83±0.21 km 6.831±0.211 km 8.79±1.97 km 8.856±0.105 km 9.00±2.24 km 10.30 km (calculated); 10.83±0.76 km
- Synodic rotation period: 2.7910±0.0005 h (Note: Pravec (2012), lightcurve plot of (1156) Kira. Observation: 10 April 2012. Rotation period 2.7910±0.0005 hours with a brightness amplitude of 0.20±0.02 mag. Quality Code of 3. summary figures at Ondrejov Asteroid Photometry Project. Note: figure published at the LCDB contains a typo.); 2.79103±0.00004 h 2.79105±0.00003 h 2.79113±0.00004 h
- Geometric albedo: 0.165±0.024; 0.181±0.052; 0.20 (assumed); 0.2490±0.0585; 0.26±0.14; 0.29±0.12; 0.455±0.066
- Spectral type: S
- Absolute magnitude (H): 12.30 · 12.40 · 12.48±0.35 · 12.72

1156 Kira, provisional designation 1928 DA, is a stony background asteroid from the inner regions of the asteroid belt, approximately 9 kilometers in diameter. It was discovered on 22 February 1928, by German astronomer Karl Reinmuth at Heidelberg Observatory in southwest Germany. Any reference of its name to a person or occurrence is unknown.

== Orbit and classification ==
Kira is not a member of any known asteroid family and belongs to the main belt's background population. At the present epoch, however, it orbits within the region of the Flora family.

This asteroid orbits the Sun in the inner main-belt at a distance of 2.1–2.3 AU once every 3 years and 4 months (1,222 days). Its orbit has an eccentricity of 0.05 and an inclination of 1° with respect to the ecliptic. The body's observation arc begins with its official discovery observation at Heidelberg.

== Physical characteristics ==
Kira is an assumed stony S-type asteroid.

=== Rotation period ===
Several rotational lightcurves of Kira have been obtained from photometric observations since 2007. Lightcurve analysis gave a rotation period between 2.7910 and 2.79113 hours with a brightness variation of 0.20 to 0.26 magnitude (U=3/3/3/2+).

=== Diameter and albedo ===
According to the surveys carried out by the Japanese Akari satellite and the NEOWISE mission of NASA's Wide-field Infrared Survey Explorer, Kira measures between 6.83 and 10.83 kilometers in diameter and its surface has an albedo between 0.165 and 0.455.

The Collaborative Asteroid Lightcurve Link assumes a standard albedo for stony asteroids of 0.20 and calculates a diameter of 10.30 kilometers based on an absolute magnitude of 12.3.

== Naming ==
This minor planet was named by astronomer Max Mündler, staff member at Heidelberg Observatory. Any reference of its name to a person or occurrence is unknown.

=== Unknown meaning ===
Among the many thousands of named minor planets, Kira is one of 120 asteroids, for which no official naming citation has been published. All of these low-numbered asteroids have numbers between 164 Eva and 1514 Ricouxa and were discovered between 1876 and the 1930s, predominantly by astronomers Auguste Charlois, Johann Palisa, Max Wolf and Karl Reinmuth.
