= 1481 Tübingia =

Main-belt asteroid

Discovery
- Discovered by: K. Reinmuth
- Discovery site: Heidelberg Obs.
- Discovery date: 7 February 1938

Designations
- Named after: Tübingen (German city)
- Alternative designations: 1938 DR · 1930 UL; 1933 FT_{1} · 1933 FY_{1} 1935 SY_{1} · 1938 CN; 1938 ES · 1939 LD; 1941 WF · 1950 OQ; 1955 LA · 1959 GY; A907 GQ · A912 FB
- Minor planet category: main-belt · (outer)

Orbital characteristics
- Epoch 4 September 2017 (JD 2458000.5)
- Uncertainty parameter 0
- Observation arc: 84.28 yr (30,783 days)
- Aphelion: 3.1492 AU
- Perihelion: 2.8896 AU
- Semi-major axis: 3.0194 AU
- Eccentricity: 0.0430
- Orbital period (sidereal): 5.25 yr (1,916 days)
- Mean anomaly: 283.84°
- Mean motion: 0° 11^{m} 16.44^{s} / day
- Inclination: 3.5098°
- Longitude of ascending node: 353.74°
- Argument of perihelion: 312.18°

Physical characteristics
- Dimensions: 33.26±1.7 km (IRAS:5); 33.770±0.139 km 35.20±0.73 km 37.316±0.332 km 40.12±0.51 km
- Synodic rotation period: 24 h 160±20 (outdated)
- Geometric albedo: 0.082±0.002; 0.0920±0.0143; 0.104±0.020; 0.1167±0.013 (IRAS:5); 0.1168 (SIMPS)
- Spectral type: C B–V = 0.920; U–B = 0.370
- Absolute magnitude (H): 10.34 · 10.35 · 10.87±0.68

1481 Tübingia, provisional designation 1938 DR, is a dark asteroid from the outer region of the asteroid belt, approximately 34 kilometers in diameter. It was discovered on 7 February 1938, by German astronomer Karl Reinmuth at Heidelberg Observatory in southern Germany, and named for the German city of Tübingen.

== Orbit and classification ==
Tübingia orbits the Sun in the outer main-belt at a distance of 2.9–3.1 AU once every 5 years and 3 months (1,916 days). Its orbit has an eccentricity of 0.04 and an inclination of 4° with respect to the ecliptic. It was first identified as A907 GQ at the U.S. Taunton Observatory in 1907. The asteroid's first used observation was made at Heidelberg in 1933, extending the body's observation arc by 5 years prior to its official discovery observation.

== Physical characteristics ==
The asteroid has been characterized as a C-type asteroid.

=== Rotation period ===
In October 2008, a rotational lightcurve of Tübingia was obtained form photometric observations by James W. Brinsfield at Via Capote Observatory (G69) in California. Analysis gave a longer-than average rotation period of 24 hours with a brightness variation of 0.20 magnitude (U=2). The result supersedes a much longer period obtained in the 1980s.

=== Diameter and albedo ===
According to the surveys carried out by the Infrared Astronomical Satellite IRAS, the Japanese Akari satellite, and NASA's Wide-field Infrared Survey Explorer with its subsequent NEOWISE mission, Tübingia measures between 33.26 and 40.12 kilometers in diameter, and its surface has an albedo of 0.082 to 0.117. The Collaborative Asteroid Lightcurve Link adopts the results from IRAS, that is, an albedo of 0.117 and a diameter of 33.26 kilometers using an absolute magnitude of 10.35.

== Naming ==
This minor planet was named after Tübingen, city in southern Germany and workplace of astronomer Johannes Kepler. The official naming citation was published by the Minor Planet Center in April 1953 (M.P.C. 909).
