= 910 Anneliese =

Main-belt asteroid

Discovery
- Discovered by: K. Reinmuth
- Discovery site: Heidelberg Obs.
- Discovery date: 1 March 1919

Designations
- Pronunciation: German: [ˈanəliːzə]
- Named after: Anneliese, friend of astronomer Julius Dick
- Alternative designations: A919 EC · 1946 SJ; 1975 AH · A924 BD; 1919 FB · 1924 BD
- Minor planet category: main-belt · (outer) background

Orbital characteristics
- Epoch 31 May 2020 (JD 2459000.5)
- Uncertainty parameter 0
- Observation arc: 100.93 yr (36,864 d)
- Aphelion: 3.3765 AU
- Perihelion: 2.4747 AU
- Semi-major axis: 2.9256 AU
- Eccentricity: 0.1541
- Orbital period (sidereal): 5.00 yr (1,828 d)
- Mean anomaly: 340.99°
- Mean motion: 0° 11^{m} 49.2^{s} / day
- Inclination: 9.2090°
- Longitude of ascending node: 49.936°
- Argument of perihelion: 208.47°

Physical characteristics
- Mean diameter: 47.07±4.5 km; 48.590±0.216 km; 48.85±0.57 km
- Synodic rotation period: 11.2863±0.0002 h
- Geometric albedo: 0.057±0.013; 0.057±0.002; 0.0605±0.013
- Spectral type: SMASS = Ch; V–R = 0.369±0.020
- Absolute magnitude (H): 10.5

910 Anneliese (prov. designation: A919 EC or 1919 FB) is a dark background asteroid, approximately 48 kilometers (30 miles) in diameter, located in the outer regions of the asteroid belt. It was discovered on 1 March 1919, by astronomer Karl Reinmuth at the Heidelberg-Königstuhl State Observatory in southwest Germany. The carbonaceous C-type asteroid (Ch) has a rotation period of 11.3 hours and is likely spherical in shape. It was named by German astronomer Julius Dick after his friend "Anneliese".

== Orbit and classification ==
Anneliese is a non-family asteroid of the main belt's background population when applying the hierarchical clustering method to its proper orbital elements. It orbits the Sun in the outer asteroid belt at a distance of 2.5–3.4 AU once every 5.00 years (1,828 days; semi-major axis of 2.93 AU). Its orbit has an eccentricity of 0.15 and an inclination of 9° with respect to the ecliptic. The body's observation arc begins at Heidelberg Observatory on 19 March 1919, or 18 days after its official discovery observation.

== Naming ==
This minor planet was named after "Anneliese", an acquaintance of the German astronomer Julius Dick from the Babelsberg Observatory, who suggested the asteroid's name. The naming was also mentioned in The Names of the Minor Planets by Paul Herget in 1955 (H 88).

== Physical characteristics ==
In the Bus–Binzel SMASS classification, Anneliese is a hydrated carbonaceous C-type asteroid (Ch).

=== Rotation period ===
In June 2015, a rotational lightcurve of Anneliese was obtained from photometric observations by Uruguayan astronomer Eduardo Álvarez at the Los Algarrobos Observatory (I38). Lightcurve analysis gave a well-defined rotation period of 11.2863±0.0002 hours with a brightness variation of 0.16±0.02 magnitude, indicative of a spherical, non-elongated shape (U=3). At the time Anneliese was one of only 17 three-digit numbered asteroids for which no period was published. In May 2015, Julian Oey at the Blue Mountains Observatory (Q68), Australia, determined a concurring period of 11.294±0.002 hours with an amplitude of 0.55±0.03 magnitude (U=2+). In May 2015 a collaboration of Spanish amateur astronomers including Alfonso Garceràn (J08), Amadeo Macias (Z95), Enrique Mansego (J67), Pedro Rodriguez (Z98) and Juan de Haro (I57) measured a period of 5.63±0.01 hours—or half the period solution of the other observations, with an amplitude of 0.13±0.01 magnitude (U=2+).

=== Diameter and albedo ===
According to the survey carried out by the Infrared Astronomical Satellite IRAS, the NEOWISE mission of NASA's Wide-field Infrared Survey Explorer (WISE), and the Japanese Akari satellite, Anneliese measures (47.07±4.5), (48.590±0.216) and (48.85±0.57) kilometers in diameter and its surface has an albedo of (0.0605±0.013), (0.057±0.013) and (0.057±0.002), respectively. The Collaborative Asteroid Lightcurve Link derives an albedo of 0.0505 and a diameter of 46.98 kilometers based on an absolute magnitude of 10.5, while Alvares gives a diameter of (46.3±3.5 km) and an albedo of (0.06±0.02). An asteroid occultation, observed on 14 September 2012, gave a best-fit ellipse dimension of 48.0 × 48.0 kilometers. These timed observations are taken when the asteroid passes in front of a distant star. However the quality of the measurement is rated poorly.

Further published mean-diameters by the WISE team include (43.35±0.30 km), (45.974±14.40 km) and (50.756±0.905 km) with corresponding albedos of (0.04±0.01), (0.0586±0.0483) and (0.0308±0.0014).
