= Karl Wilhelm Reinmuth =

German astronomer (1892–1979)

- Born: 4 April 1892; Heidelberg, Germany
- Died: 6 May 1979 (aged 87); Heidelberg, Germany
- Occupation: Astronomer

Minor planets discovered: 395
see § List of discovered minor planets

Karl Wilhelm Reinmuth (4 April 1892 in Heidelberg – 6 May 1979 in Heidelberg) was a German astronomer and a prolific discoverer of 395 minor planets.

== Scientific career ==
From 1912 to 1957, Reinmuth worked as an astronomer at the Heidelberg Observatory (German: Landessternwarte Heidelberg-Königstuhl), an astronomical observatory on the Königstuhl hill above Heidelberg in southern Germany. He was a member of the minor planet studies group at the Astronomisches Rechen-Institut between 1947 and 1950, and later became "Oberobservator" or chief observer at Heidelberg Observatory until his retirement in 1957. Reinmuth obtained more than 12,500 precise astrometric measurements of minor planets' positions on photographic plates, a significant accomplishment before computer-based assistance existed.

== Honours ==
The outer main-belt asteroid 1111 Reinmuthia, discovered by Reinmuth himself at Heidelberg in 1912, was named in his honour (H 104).

== Discoveries ==
Among his most notable discoveries are the two near-Earth objects (NEOs) 1862 Apollo, the namesake of the Apollo group which became the largest group of asteroids within the NEO category with nearly 8,000 members, and 69230 Hermes, famous for being a lost asteroid for more than half a century until its recovery in 2003, and for being the only unnumbered but named asteroid during that period.

He also discovered several large Jupiter trojans including 911 Agamemnon, 1143 Odysseus, 1172 Äneas, 1173 Anchises, 1208 Troilus, 1404 Ajax, 1437 Diomedes and 1749 Telamon. The main-belt asteroid 5535 Annefrank, which he discovered in 1942 during World War II, was later visited by the Stardust spacecraft in 2002. His lowest numbered minor planet discovery is 796 Sarita, an asteroid from the middle region of the main-belt. Reinmuth also discovered two periodic comets of the Jupiter family, namely 30P/Reinmuth and 44P/Reinmuth.

=== Meta-naming ===
The initials of the minor planets (1227) through (1234), all discovered by Reinmuth, spell out "G. Stracke". Gustav Stracke was a German astronomer and orbit computer, who had asked that no planet be named after him. In this manner Reinmuth was able to honour the man whilst also honouring his wish:

- 1227 Geranium
- 1228 Scabiosa
- 1229 Tilia
- 1230 Riceia
- 1231 Auricula
- 1232 Cortusa
- 1233 Kobresia
- 1234 Elyna

Later 1019 Strackea, also discovered by Reinmuth, was named after Stracke.

=== List of discovered minor planets ===
Karl Reinmuth is credited by the Minor Planet Center with the discovery of 395 minor planets made during 1914–1957, with an interruption from April 1943 to July 1949 due to the end and the aftermath of WWII.

796 Sarita	15 October 1914
799 Gudula	9 March 1915
864 Aase	30 September 1921
909 Ulla	7 February 1919
910 Anneliese	1 March 1919
911 Agamemnon	19 March 1919
913 Otila	19 May 1919
918 Itha	22 August 1919
920 Rogeria	1 September 1919
921 Jovita	4 September 1919
922 Schlutia	18 September 1919
923 Herluga	30 September 1919
924 Toni	20 October 1919
926 Imhilde	15 February 1920
928 Hildrun	23 February 1920
929 Algunde	10 March 1920
933 Susi	10 February 1927
935 Clivia	7 September 1920
936 Kunigunde	8 September 1920
937 Bethgea	12 September 1920

938 Chlosinde	9 September 1920
939 Isberga	4 October 1920
940 Kordula	10 October 1920
942 Romilda	11 October 1920
943 Begonia	20 October 1920
948 Jucunda	3 March 1921
950 Ahrensa	1 April 1921
954 Li	4 August 1921
955 Alstede	5 August 1921
956 Elisa	8 August 1921
957 Camelia	7 September 1921
958 Asplinda	28 September 1921
959 Arne	30 September 1921
960 Birgit	1 October 1921
961 Gunnie	10 October 1921
962 Aslög	25 October 1921
963 Iduberga	26 October 1921
968 Petunia	24 November 1921
970 Primula	29 November 1921
973 Aralia	18 March 1922

974 Lioba	18 March 1922
979 Ilsewa	29 June 1922
983 Gunila	30 July 1922
984 Gretia	27 August 1922
985 Rosina	14 October 1922
987 Wallia	23 October 1922
994 Otthild	18 March 1923
997 Priska	12 July 1923
998 Bodea	6 August 1923
999 Zachia	9 August 1923
1000 Piazzia	12 August 1923
1003 Lilofee	13 September 1923
1009 Sirene	31 October 1923
1010 Marlene	12 November 1923
1011 Laodamia	5 January 1924
1012 Sarema	12 January 1924
1014 Semphyra	29 January 1924
1015 Christa	31 January 1924
1016 Anitra	31 January 1924
1018 Arnolda	3 March 1924

1019 Strackea	3 March 1924
1020 Arcadia	7 March 1924
1023 Thomana	25 June 1924
1025 Riema	12 August 1923
1026 Ingrid	13 August 1923
1035 Amata	29 September 1924
1041 Asta	22 March 1925
1042 Amazone	22 April 1925
1043 Beate	22 April 1925
1044 Teutonia	10 May 1924
1047 Geisha	17 November 1924
1048 Feodosia	29 November 1924
1049 Gotho	14 September 1925
1050 Meta	14 September 1925
1051 Merope	16 September 1925
1054 Forsytia	20 November 1925
1056 Azalea	31 January 1924
1060 Magnolia	13 August 1925
1061 Paeonia	10 October 1925
1063 Aquilegia	6 December 1925

1064 Aethusa	2 August 1926
1066 Lobelia	1 September 1926
1067 Lunaria	9 September 1926
1070 Tunica	1 September 1926
1072 Malva	4 October 1926
1076 Viola	5 October 1926
1077 Campanula	6 October 1926
1078 Mentha	7 December 1926
1080 Orchis	30 August 1927
1081 Reseda	31 August 1927
1082 Pirola	28 October 1927
1083 Salvia	26 January 1928
1085 Amaryllis	31 August 1927
1087 Arabis	2 September 1927
1091 Spiraea	26 February 1928
1092 Lilium	12 January 1924
1095 Tulipa	14 April 1926
1097 Vicia	11 August 1928
1100 Arnica	22 September 1928
1101 Clematis	22 September 1928

1104 Syringa	9 December 1928
1105 Fragaria	1 January 1929
1106 Cydonia	5 February 1929
1108 Demeter	31 May 1929
1109 Tata	5 February 1929
1111 Reinmuthia	11 February 1927
1119 Euboea	27 October 1927
1126 Otero	11 January 1929
1130 Skuld	2 September 1929
1131 Porzia	10 September 1929
1138 Attica	22 November 1929
1142 Aetolia	24 January 1930
1143 Odysseus	28 January 1930
1144 Oda	28 January 1930
1150 Achaia	2 September 1929
1151 Ithaka	8 September 1929
1152 Pawona	8 January 1930
1154 Astronomia	8 February 1927
1155 Aënna	26 January 1928
1156 Kira	22 February 1928

1157 Arabia	31 August 1929
1159 Granada	2 September 1929
1160 Illyria	9 September 1929
1161 Thessalia	29 September 1929
1162 Larissa	5 January 1930
1163 Saga	20 January 1930
1164 Kobolda	19 March 1930
1172 Äneas	17 October 1930
1173 Anchises	17 October 1930
1174 Marmara	17 October 1930
1175 Margo	17 October 1930
1180 Rita	9 April 1931
1182 Ilona	3 March 1927
1183 Jutta	22 February 1930
1184 Gaea	5 September 1926
1187 Afra	6 December 1929
1198 Atlantis	7 September 1931
1200 Imperatrix	14 September 1931
1201 Strenua	14 September 1931
1204 Renzia	6 October 1931

1205 Ebella	6 October 1931
1206 Numerowia	18 October 1931
1207 Ostenia	15 November 1931
1208 Troilus	31 December 1931
1209 Pumma	22 April 1927
1216 Askania	29 January 1932
1218 Aster	29 January 1932
1220 Crocus	11 February 1932
1223 Neckar	6 October 1931
1227 Geranium	5 October 1931
1228 Scabiosa	5 October 1931
1229 Tilia	9 October 1931
1230 Riceia	9 October 1931
1231 Auricula	10 October 1931
1232 Cortusa	10 October 1931
1233 Kobresia	10 October 1931
1234 Elyna	18 October 1931
1235 Schorria	18 October 1931
1249 Rutherfordia	4 November 1932
1250 Galanthus	25 January 1933

1251 Hedera	25 January 1933
1253 Frisia	9 October 1931
1256 Normannia	8 August 1932
1257 Mora	8 August 1932
1258 Sicilia	8 August 1932
1259 Ógyalla	29 January 1933
1260 Walhalla	29 January 1933
1272 Gefion	10 October 1931
1273 Helma	8 August 1932
1275 Cimbria	30 November 1932
1284 Latvia	27 July 1933
1297 Quadea	7 January 1934
1298 Nocturna	7 January 1934
1302 Werra	28 September 1924
1304 Arosa	21 May 1928
1308 Halleria	12 March 1931
1311 Knopfia	24 March 1933
1317 Silvretta	1 September 1935
1322 Coppernicus	15 June 1934
1334 Lundmarka	16 July 1934

1335 Demoulina	7 September 1934
1346 Gotha	5 February 1929
1370 Hella	31 August 1935
1371 Resi	31 August 1935
1372 Haremari	31 August 1935
1382 Gerti	21 January 1925
1395 Aribeda	16 July 1936
1399 Teneriffa	23 August 1936
1402 Eri	16 July 1936
1404 Ajax	17 August 1936
1408 Trusanda	23 November 1936
1409 Isko	8 January 1937
1410 Margret	8 January 1937
1411 Brauna	8 January 1937
1417 Walinskia	1 April 1937
1419 Danzig	5 September 1929
1420 Radcliffe	14 September 1931
1422 Strömgrenia	23 August 1936
1435 Garlena	23 November 1936
1437 Diomedes	3 August 1937

1438 Wendeline	11 October 1937
1439 Vogtia	11 October 1937
1440 Rostia	11 October 1937
1443 Ruppina	29 December 1937
1457 Ankara	3 August 1937
1466 Mündleria	31 May 1938
1469 Linzia	19 August 1938
1481 Tübingia	7 February 1938
1482 Sebastiana	20 February 1938
1485 Isa	28 July 1938
1487 Boda	17 November 1938
1502 Arenda	17 November 1938
1528 Conrada	10 February 1940
1553 Bauersfelda	13 January 1940
1556 Wingolfia	14 January 1942
1557 Roehla	14 January 1942
1561 Fricke	15 February 1941
1562 Gondolatsch	9 March 1943
1587 Kahrstedt	25 March 1933
1611 Beyer	17 February 1950

1612 Hirose	23 January 1950
1624 Rabe	9 October 1931
1628 Strobel	11 September 1923
1632 Sieböhme	26 February 1941
1635 Bohrmann	7 March 1924
1636 Porter	23 January 1950
1642 Hill	4 September 1951
1643 Brown	4 September 1951
1645 Waterfield	24 July 1933
1650 Heckmann	11 October 1937
1662 Hoffmann	11 September 1923
1665 Gaby	27 February 1930
1668 Hanna	24 July 1933
1669 Dagmar	7 September 1934
1673 van Houten	11 October 1937
1674 Groeneveld	7 February 1938
1682 Karel	2 August 1949
1691 Oort	9 September 1956
1704 Wachmann	7 March 1924
1706 Dieckvoss	5 October 1931

1716 Peter	4 April 1934
1719 Jens	17 February 1950
1720 Niels	7 February 1935
1726 Hoffmeister	24 July 1933
1732 Heike	9 March 1943
1739 Meyermann	15 August 1939
1742 Schaifers	7 September 1934
1749 Telamon	23 September 1949
1750 Eckert	15 July 1950
1759 Kienle	11 September 1942
1782 Schneller	6 October 1931
1785 Wurm	15 February 1941
1814 Bach	9 October 1931
1815 Beethoven	27 January 1932
1818 Brahms	15 August 1939
1820 Lohmann	2 August 1949
1823 Gliese	4 September 1951
1825 Klare	31 August 1954
1849 Kresák	14 January 1942
1850 Kohoutek	23 March 1942

1862 Apollo	24 April 1932
1880 McCrosky	13 January 1940
1881 Shao	3 August 1940
1913 Sekanina	22 September 1928
1941 Wild	6 October 1931
1944 Günter	14 September 1925
1950 Wempe	23 March 1942
1968 Mehltretter	29 January 1932
1985 Hopmann	13 January 1929
1990 Pilcher	9 March 1956
2018 Schuster	17 October 1931
2022 West	7 February 1938
2057 Rosemary	7 September 1934
2097 Galle	11 August 1953
2136 Jugta	24 July 1933
2137 Priscilla	24 August 1936
2157 Ashbrook	7 March 1924
2158 Tietjen	24 July 1933
2181 Fogelin	28 December 1942
2214 Carol	7 April 1953

2235 Vittore	5 April 1924
2236 Austrasia	23 March 1933
2248 Kanda	27 February 1933
2249 Yamamoto	6 April 1942
2278 Götz	7 April 1953
2290 Helffrich	14 February 1932
2306 Bauschinger	15 August 1939
2346 Lilio	5 February 1934
2358 Bahner	2 September 1929
2359 Debehogne	5 October 1931
2391 Tomita	9 January 1957
2414 Vibeke	18 October 1931
2444 Lederle	5 February 1934
2453 Wabash	30 September 1921
2465 Wilson	2 August 1949
2485 Scheffler	29 January 1932
2500 Alascattalo	2 April 1926
2537 Gilmore	4 September 1951
2560 Siegma	14 February 1932
2572 Annschnell	17 February 1950

2591 Dworetsky	2 August 1949
2615 Saito	4 September 1951
2623 Zech	22 September 1919
2637 Bobrovnikoff	22 September 1919
2652 Yabuuti	7 April 1953
2664 Everhart	7 September 1934
2676 Aarhus	25 August 1933
2749 Walterhorn	11 October 1937
2806 Graz	7 April 1953
2824 Franke	4 February 1934
2855 Bastian	10 October 1931
2856 Röser	14 April 1933
2879 Shimizu	14 February 1932
2896 Preiss	15 September 1931
2897 Ole Römer	5 February 1932
2942 Cordie	29 January 1932
2943 Heinrich	25 August 1933
2944 Peyo	31 August 1935
2957 Tatsuo	5 February 1934
3008 Nojiri	17 November 1938

3020 Naudts	2 August 1949
3035 Chambers	7 March 1924
3144 Brosche	10 October 1931
3183 Franzkaiser	2 August 1949
3219 Komaki	4 February 1934
3227 Hasegawa	24 February 1928
3263 Bligh	5 February 1932
3264 Bounty	7 January 1934
3265 Fletcher	9 November 1953
3289 Mitani	7 September 1934
3295 Murakami	17 February 1950
3370 Kohsai	4 February 1934
3379 Oishi	6 October 1931
3383 Koyama	9 January 1951
3404 Hinderer	4 February 1934
3415 Danby	22 September 1928
3416 Dorrit	8 November 1931
3417 Tamblyn	1 April 1937
3425 Hurukawa	29 January 1929
3426 Seki	5 February 1932

3440 Stampfer	17 February 1950
3446 Combes	12 March 1942
3473 Sapporo	7 March 1924
3500 Kobayashi	18 September 1919
3555 Miyasaka	6 October 1931
3569 Kumon	20 February 1938
3644 Kojitaku	5 October 1931
3682 Welther	12 July 1923
3707 Schröter	5 February 1934
3722 Urata	29 October 1927
3745 Petaev	23 September 1949
3790 Raywilson	26 October 1937
3911 Otomo	31 August 1940
3937 Bretagnon	14 March 1932
3938 Chapront	2 August 1949
3939 Huruhata	7 April 1953
3957 Sugie	24 July 1933
4001 Ptolemaeus	2 August 1949
4002 Shinagawa	14 May 1950
4417 Lecar	8 April 1931

4418 Fredfranklin	9 October 1931
4419 Allancook	24 April 1932
4421 Kayor	14 January 1942
4589 McDowell	24 July 1933
4615 Zinner	13 September 1923
4647 Syuji	9 October 1931
4648 Tirion	18 October 1931
4650 Mori	5 October 1950
4723 Wolfgangmattig	11 October 1937
4808 Ballaero	21 January 1925
4849 Ardenne	17 August 1936
4910 Kawasato	11 August 1953
4979 Otawara	2 August 1949
5072 Hioki	9 October 1931
5152 Labs	18 October 1931
5494 Johanmohr	19 October 1933
5532 Ichinohe	14 February 1932
5535 Annefrank	23 March 1942
5657 Groombridge	28 August 1936
5658 Clausbaader	17 February 1950

5703 Hevelius	15 November 1931
5704 Schumacher	17 February 1950
6260 Kelsey	2 August 1949
6808 Plantin	5 February 1932
6809 Sakuma	20 February 1938
7042 Carver	24 March 1933
7103 Wichmann	7 April 1953
7449 Döllen	21 August 1949
7542 Johnpond	7 April 1953
11434 Lohnert	10 October 1931
(11435) 1931 UB	17 October 1931
13473 Hokema	7 April 1953
(30717) 1937 UD	26 October 1937
32730 Lamarr	4 September 1951
69230 Hermes	28 October 1937

== Works ==
- The Herschel nebulas, De Gruyter, Berlin 1926
- Catalog of 6.500 exact photographic positions of small planets, brown, Karlsruhe 1953
