= 1944 Günter =

Main-belt asteroid

Discovery
- Discovered by: K. Reinmuth
- Discovery site: Heidelberg Obs.
- Discovery date: 14 September 1925

Designations
- Named after: Günter Reinmuth (son of discoverer)
- Alternative designations: 1925 RA · 1972 TY_{3}
- Minor planet category: main-belt · (inner)

Orbital characteristics
- Epoch 4 September 2017 (JD 2458000.5)
- Uncertainty parameter 0
- Observation arc: 91.52 yr (33,426 days)
- Aphelion: 2.7709 AU
- Perihelion: 1.7080 AU
- Semi-major axis: 2.2394 AU
- Eccentricity: 0.2373
- Orbital period (sidereal): 3.35 yr (1,224 days)
- Mean anomaly: 166.20°
- Mean motion: 0° 17^{m} 38.76^{s} / day
- Inclination: 5.4892°
- Longitude of ascending node: 212.44°
- Argument of perihelion: 124.82°

Physical characteristics
- Dimensions: 4.905±0.070 km
- Geometric albedo: 0.117±0.015
- Absolute magnitude (H): 13.8

1944 Günter, provisional designation 1925 RA, is an asteroid from the inner regions of the asteroid belt, approximately 5 kilometers in diameter.

It was discovered on 14 September 1925, by German astronomer Karl Reinmuth at Heidelberg Observatory in southern Germany, and named after the discoverer's son, Günter Reinmuth.

== Orbit and classification ==
Günter orbits the Sun in the inner main-belt at a distance of 1.7–2.8 AU once every 3 years and 4 months (1,224 days). Its orbit has an eccentricity of 0.24 and an inclination of 5° with respect to the ecliptic. As no precoveries were taken and no prior identifications were made, the body's observation arc begins at Heidelberg, one night after its official discovery observation.

== Physical characteristics ==
According to the survey carried out by NASA's Wide-field Infrared Survey Explorer with its subsequent NEOWISE mission, Günter measures 4.9 kilometers in diameter, and its surface has an albedo of 0.117. As of 2017, its composition, rotation period and shape remain unknown.

== Naming ==
This minor planet was named by Karl Reinmuth after his son, Günter Reinmuth. The official naming citation was published by the Minor Planet Center on 18 April 1977 (M.P.C. 4157).
