= 799 Gudula =

Main-belt asteroid

Discovery
- Discovered by: K. Reinmuth
- Discovery site: Heidelberg Obs.
- Discovery date: 9 March 1915

Designations
- Pronunciation: /ˈɡjuːdələ/
- Alternative designations: 1915 WO

Orbital characteristics
- Epoch 31 July 2016 (JD 2457600.5)
- Uncertainty parameter 0
- Observation arc: 109.04 yr (39828 d)
- Aphelion: 2.5974 AU (388.57 Gm)
- Perihelion: 2.4883 AU (372.24 Gm)
- Semi-major axis: 2.5428 AU (380.40 Gm)
- Eccentricity: 0.021454
- Orbital period (sidereal): 4.05 yr (1481.0 d)
- Mean anomaly: 132.296°
- Mean motion: 0° 14^{m} 35.052^{s} / day
- Inclination: 5.2827°
- Longitude of ascending node: 164.879°
- Argument of perihelion: 238.013°

Physical characteristics
- Mean radius: 21.815±1.25 km
- Mass: (2.7±1.0)×10^{17} kg (Note: Calculated from its standard gravitational parameter GM = 0.018±0.007 km^{3}/s^{2}.)
- Mean density: 5.02 g/cm^{3} (Note: Assuming a diameter of 47.2 km.)
- Synodic rotation period: 14.814 h (0.6173 d)
- Geometric albedo: 0.0704±0.009
- Absolute magnitude (H): 10.2

799 Gudula is a minor planet orbiting the Sun discovered by German astronomer Karl Wilhelm Reinmuth on 9 March 1915 at the Heidelberg observatory.

Photometric observations of this asteroid at the Oakley Observatory in Terre Haute, Indiana, during 2006 gave a light curve with a period of 14.814 ± 0.003 hours and a brightness variation of 0.30 ± 0.03 in magnitude.
