= 2591 Dworetsky =

Main-belt asteroid

Discovery
- Discovered by: K. Reinmuth
- Discovery site: Heidelberg Obs.
- Discovery date: 2 August 1949

Designations
- Named after: Michael Dworetsky (British astronomer)
- Alternative designations: 1949 PS · 1929 RH_{1} 1934 RD · 1949 QU; 1952 DC_{1} · 1962 BD; 1962 EH · 1969 OC; 1973 GQ · 1975 TU_{4} 1978 GX_{3} · 1979 OD_{14} 1981 YL_{2} · 1982 BO
- Minor planet category: main-belt · (outer)

Orbital characteristics
- Epoch 4 September 2017 (JD 2458000.5)
- Uncertainty parameter 0
- Observation arc: 82.57 yr (30,159 days)
- Aphelion: 3.0614 AU
- Perihelion: 2.8135 AU
- Semi-major axis: 2.9374 AU
- Eccentricity: 0.0422
- Orbital period (sidereal): 5.03 yr (1,839 days)
- Mean anomaly: 236.94°
- Mean motion: 0° 11^{m} 44.88^{s} / day
- Inclination: 1.5430°
- Longitude of ascending node: 356.26°
- Argument of perihelion: 273.52°

Physical characteristics
- Dimensions: 12.925±0.141; 13.269±0.195 km 15.60 km (calculated)
- Synodic rotation period: 12.77±0.05 h
- Geometric albedo: 0.20 (assumed); 0.2792±0.0310; 0.291±0.037
- Spectral type: S
- Absolute magnitude (H): 11.4 · 11.5 · 11.70±0.46

2591 Dworetsky, provisional designation 1949 PS, is a stony asteroid from the outer region of the asteroid belt, approximately 13 kilometers in diameter.

The asteroid was discovered on 2 August 1949, by German astronomer Karl Reinmuth at the Heidelberg Observatory in southern Germany. It was later named after British/American astronomer Michael Dworetsky.

== Orbit and classification ==
Dworetsky orbits the Sun in the outer main-belt at a distance of 2.8–3.1 AU once every 5.03 years (1,839 days). Its orbit has an eccentricity of 0.04 and an inclination of 2° with respect to the ecliptic.

== Physical characteristics ==
The asteroid has been characterized as a common S-type asteroid by PanSTARRS' photometric survey.

Dworetsky has a rotation period of 12.8 hours and an albedo of 0.279 and 0.291, based on observations made by NASA's Wide-field Infrared Survey Explorer and its subsequent NEOWISE mission. The Collaborative Asteroid Lightcurve Link assumes a standard albedo for stony asteroids of 0.20, and calculates a diameter of 15.6 kilometers, based on an absolute magnitude of 11.5.

== Naming ==
This minor planet was named in honor of British/American astronomer Michael Dworetsky, senior lecturer at University College London (UCL). He is an active member of the International Astronomical Union, affiliated to several divisions, including "Education, Outreach and Heritage". His research involve the stellar abundances of the mercury group of elements and has also taken a large part in the development of the undergraduate astronomy degree program. The asteroid's name was proposed by Conrad Bardwell (also see 1615 Bardwell), who made the identifications involving this minor planet. The official naming citation was published by the Minor Planet Center on 27 June 1991 (M.P.C. 18448).
