= 1044 Teutonia =

Main-belt asteroid

Discovery
- Discovered by: K. Reinmuth
- Discovery site: Heidelberg Obs.
- Discovery date: 10 May 1924

Designations
- Pronunciation: /tjuːˈtoʊniə/
- Named after: Land of the Teutons
- Alternative designations: 1924 RO · 1925 XF; 1929 RP · 1949 KX; 1954 UY_{1} · 1958 RG; 1958 UP · A907 EE
- Minor planet category: main-belt · (middle)

Orbital characteristics
- Epoch 4 September 2017 (JD 2458000.5)
- Uncertainty parameter 0
- Observation arc: 109.95 yr (40,158 days)
- Aphelion: 2.9470 AU
- Perihelion: 2.2044 AU
- Semi-major axis: 2.5757 AU
- Eccentricity: 0.1442
- Orbital period (sidereal): 4.13 yr (1,510 days)
- Mean anomaly: 147.35°
- Mean motion: 0° 14^{m} 18.24^{s} / day
- Inclination: 4.2515°
- Longitude of ascending node: 59.962°
- Argument of perihelion: 228.45°

Physical characteristics
- Dimensions: 15.20±1.3 km 15.30 km (derived); 16.85±0.61 km 17.511±0.213 km 17.929±0.192 km
- Synodic rotation period: 2.84±0.04 h 3.140±0.0010 h 3.153±0.003 h 3.157±0.001 h 3.158±0.001 h 3.18±0.02 h
- Geometric albedo: 0.2449±0.0196; 0.251±0.049; 0.273±0.021; 0.3340±0.063; 0.3613 (derived)
- Spectral type: S
- Absolute magnitude (H): 10.533±0.002 (R) · 10.8 · 10.9

1044 Teutonia, provisional designation 1924 RO, is a stony asteroid from the central regions of the asteroid belt, approximately 16 kilometers in diameter. It was discovered on 10 May 1924, by astronomer Karl Reinmuth at Heidelberg Observatory in southwest Germany. The asteroid was named after the land inhabited by the Teutonic people.

== Classification and orbit ==
Teutonia orbits the Sun in the central main-belt at a distance of 2.2–2.9 AU once every 4 years and 2 months (1,510 days). Its orbit has an eccentricity of 0.14 and an inclination of 4° with respect to the ecliptic.

The asteroid's observation arc begin 17 years prior to its official discovery observation, with its first identification as A907 EE at Taunton Observatory (803) in March 1907.

== Physical characteristics ==
=== Lightcurves ===
Images of the object made during 2007 were used to produce a light curve that gave a synodic period of 2.84 ± 0.04 h. However, a study made in 2006 gave a period of 3.153 ± 0.003, which can not yet be ruled out. The brightness of the object varied by 0.20 ± 0.03 in magnitude over the course of each rotation.

=== Diameter and albedo ===
According to the surveys carried out by the Infrared Astronomical Satellite IRAS, the Japanese Akari satellite, and NASA's Wide-field Infrared Survey Explorer with its subsequent NEOWISE mission, Teutonia measures between 15.20 and 17.929 kilometers in diameter and its surface has an albedo between 0.2449 and 0.3340. The Collaborative Asteroid Lightcurve Link derives an albedo of 0.3613 and a diameter of 15.30 kilometers based on an absolute magnitude of 10.8.

== Naming ==
This minor planet was named for the land once inhabited by the Teutons, a Germanic tribe that lived in what is now Jutland. The name was proposed by astronomer Gustav Stracke.
