= 4647 Syuji =

Main-belt asteroid

Discovery
- Discovered by: K. Reinmuth
- Discovery site: Heidelberg Obs.
- Discovery date: 9 October 1931

Designations
- Named after: Shuji Hayakawa (Japanese astronomer)
- Alternative designations: 1931 TU_{1} · 1970 PD; 1979 FN_{3} · 1979 GA; 1980 RF_{4}
- Minor planet category: main-belt · (outer) background

Orbital characteristics
- Epoch 23 March 2018 (JD 2458200.5)
- Uncertainty parameter 0
- Observation arc: 86.39 yr (31,553 d)
- Aphelion: 3.6451 AU
- Perihelion: 2.1369 AU
- Semi-major axis: 2.8910 AU
- Eccentricity: 0.2608
- Orbital period (sidereal): 4.92 yr (1,795 d)
- Mean anomaly: 240.47°
- Mean motion: 0° 12^{m} 1.8^{s} / day
- Inclination: 6.9377°
- Longitude of ascending node: 180.58°
- Argument of perihelion: 128.29°

Physical characteristics
- Mean diameter: 13.864±0.057 km
- Geometric albedo: 0.063±0.004
- Absolute magnitude (H): 12.8

4647 Syuji, provisional designation 1931 TU_{1}, is a dark background asteroid from the outer regions of the asteroid belt, approximately 14 kilometers (8.7 miles) in diameter. It was discovered on 9 October 1931, by German astronomer Karl Reinmuth at the Heidelberg Observatory in southwest Germany. The likely carbonaceous asteroid was named for Japanese astronomer Shuji Hayakawa.

== Orbit and classification ==
Syuji is a non-family asteroid from the main belt's background population. It orbits the Sun in the outer main-belt at a distance of 2.1–3.6 AU once every 4 years and 11 months (1,795 days; semi-major axis of 2.89 AU). Its orbit has an eccentricity of 0.26 and an inclination of 7° with respect to the ecliptic. The body's observation arc begins at Heidelberg on 17 October 1931, or eight nights after its official discovery observation. orbital read

== Physical characteristics ==
Syuji has an absolute magnitude of 12.8. Based on the body's albedo (see below) and its location in the asteroid belt, it is likely a carbonaceous asteroid. As of 2018, no rotational lightcurve of Syuji has been obtained from photometric observations. The body's rotation period, pole and shape remain unknown.

=== Diameter and albedo ===
According to the survey carried out by the NEOWISE mission of NASA's Wide-field Infrared Survey Explorer, Syuji measures 13.864 kilometers in diameter and its surface has an albedo of 0.063.

== Naming ==
This minor planet was named after Japanese astronomer Shuji Hayakawa (born 1958; first name also spelled "Syuji" or "Shūji"), an observer of comets and discoverer of minor planets at the Okutama Observatory (877) in Okutama, west of Tokyo. The official naming was proposed by Takao Kobayashi and the citation was published by the Minor Planet Center on 25 May 1994 (M.P.C. 23540).
