= 1258 Sicilia =

Dark background asteroid

Discovery
- Discovered by: K. Reinmuth
- Discovery site: Heidelberg Obs.
- Discovery date: 8 August 1932

Designations
- Pronunciation: /sɪˈsɪliə/
- Named after: Sicily (Italian island)
- Alternative designations: 1932 PG · 1935 BG
- Minor planet category: main-belt · (outer) background

Orbital characteristics
- Epoch 4 September 2017 (JD 2458000.5)
- Uncertainty parameter 0
- Observation arc: 85.22 yr (31,128 days)
- Aphelion: 3.3218 AU
- Perihelion: 3.0484 AU
- Semi-major axis: 3.1851 AU
- Eccentricity: 0.0429
- Orbital period (sidereal): 5.68 yr (2,076 days)
- Mean anomaly: 304.82°
- Mean motion: 0° 10^{m} 24.24^{s} / day
- Inclination: 7.7022°
- Longitude of ascending node: 299.61°
- Argument of perihelion: 77.861°

Physical characteristics
- Dimensions: 36.83±13.91 km 41.94±12.35 km 44.39 km (derived); 44.47±2.4 km 44.86±0.75 km 45.669±0.174 km 52.529±0.192 km
- Synodic rotation period: 13.500±0.003 h
- Geometric albedo: 0.0369±0.0037; 0.0470 (derived); 0.050±0.009; 0.056±0.002; 0.0564±0.007; 0.06±0.04; 0.07±0.05
- Spectral type: C (assumed)
- Absolute magnitude (H): 10.50 · 10.60 · 10.7 · 10.77 · 10.89±0.32

1258 Sicilia, provisional designation 1932 PG, is a dark background asteroid from the outer regions of the asteroid belt, approximately 44 kilometers in diameter. It was discovered on 8 August 1932, by astronomer Karl Reinmuth at the Heidelberg-Königstuhl State Observatory in southwest Germany. The asteroid was named after the Italian island of Sicily.

== Orbit and classification ==
Sicilia is a non-family asteroid of the main belt's background population. It orbits the Sun in the outer asteroid belt at a distance of 3.0–3.3 AU once every 5 years and 8 months (2,076 days; semi-major axis of 3.19 AU). Its orbit has an eccentricity of 0.04 and an inclination of 8° with respect to the ecliptic. The body's observation arc begins with its official discovery observation at Heidelberg in 1932.

== Physical characteristics ==
Sicilia is an assumed carbonaceous C-type asteroid.

=== Rotation period ===
In May 2010, a first rotational lightcurve of Sicilia was obtained from photometric observations by astronomers at the Oakley Southern Sky Observatory (E09) in Australia. Lightcurve analysis gave a rotation period of 13.500 hours with a brightness amplitude of 0.19 magnitude (U=3-).

=== Diameter and albedo ===
According to the surveys carried out by the Japanese Akari satellite, the NEOWISE mission of NASA's Wide-field Infrared Survey Explorer, and the Infrared Astronomical Satellite IRAS, Sicilia measures between 36.83 and 52.529 kilometers in diameter and its surface has an albedo between 0.0369 and 0.07.

The Collaborative Asteroid Lightcurve Link largely agrees with IRAS and derives an albedo of 0.0470 and a diameter of 44.39 kilometers based on an absolute magnitude of 10.7.

== Naming ==
This minor planet was named after the Italian island of Sicily in the Mediterranean Sea. The official naming citation was mentioned in The Names of the Minor Planets by Paul Herget in 1955 (H 116).
