= 1297 Quadea =

Eoan asteroid

Discovery
- Discovered by: K. Reinmuth
- Discovery site: Heidelberg Obs.
- Discovery date: 7 January 1934

Designations
- Named after: Quadea (parents-in-law of the discoverer's brother)
- Alternative designations: 1934 AD · 1927 VB; 1929 CA_{1} · 1929 EJ
- Minor planet category: main-belt · (outer); Eos

Orbital characteristics
- Epoch 4 September 2017 (JD 2458000.5)
- Uncertainty parameter 0
- Observation arc: 89.31 yr (32,619 days)
- Aphelion: 3.2383 AU
- Perihelion: 2.8024 AU
- Semi-major axis: 3.0203 AU
- Eccentricity: 0.0722
- Orbital period (sidereal): 5.25 yr (1,917 days)
- Mean anomaly: 30.780°
- Mean motion: 0° 11^{m} 16.08^{s} / day
- Inclination: 9.0027°
- Longitude of ascending node: 295.94°
- Argument of perihelion: 123.49°

Physical characteristics
- Dimensions: 19.62±1.00 km 22.420±0.255 km 23.408±0.216 km 23.47 km (calculated); 24.77±0.49 km
- Synodic rotation period: 6.256±0.005 h 6.267±0.001 h 6.267±0.005 h (Note: Lightcurve plot of (1297) Quadea by Brian D. Warner (2016) at PDS/CS3. Rotation period 6.267±0.005 hours with a brightness amplitude of 0.24 mag. Quality Code of 3. Summary figures at LCDB); 6.268±0.0012 h
- Geometric albedo: 0.14 (assumed); 0.142±0.007; 0.1551±0.0098; 0.200±0.033
- Spectral type: C · S
- Absolute magnitude (H): 10.668±0.001 (R) · 10.80 · 10.87±0.28 · 10.90

1297 Quadea, provisional designation 1934 AD, is an Eoan asteroid from the outer regions of the asteroid belt, approximately 23 kilometers in diameter. It was discovered on 7 January 1934, by astronomer Karl Reinmuth at the Heidelberg-Königstuhl State Observatory in Germany. The asteroid was named for the parents-in-law of the discoverer's brother.

== Orbit and classification ==
Quadea is a member the Eos family (606), the largest asteroid family in the outer main belt consisting of nearly 10,000 known asteroids. It orbits the Sun at a distance of 2.8–3.2 AU once every 5 years and 3 months (1,917 days). Its orbit has an eccentricity of 0.07 and an inclination of 9° with respect to the ecliptic.

The body's observation arc begins more than six years prior to its official discovery observation with its first identification as 1927 VB at Heidelberg in November 1927.

== Physical characteristics ==
Quadea has been characterized as a carbonaceous C-type asteroid by PanSTARRS photometric survey. The asteroid is also an assumed S-type asteroid, while the overall spectral type for members of the Eos family is that of a K-type, with albedos in-between the S-and C-types.

=== Rotation period ===
Since 2006, several rotational lightcurves of Quadea have obtained by astronomers Pierre Antonini and Brian Warner, as well as from photometric observations at the Palomar Transient Factory, California, and the Oakley Southern Sky Observatory (E09) in Australia. Analysis of the best-rated lightcurve gave a well-defined rotation period of 6.267 hours and a brightness variation of 0.35 magnitude (U=3/3/3/2).

=== Diameter and albedo ===
According to the survey carried out by the NEOWISE mission of NASA's Wide-field Infrared Survey Explorer, Quadea measures between 19.62 and 22.42 kilometers in diameter and its surface has an albedo between 0.1551 and 0.200, while the Japanese Akari satellite found a diameter of 24.7 kilometers with an albedo of 0.142. The Collaborative Asteroid Lightcurve Link assumes an albedo of 0.14 and calculates a diameter of 23.47 kilometers based on an absolute magnitude of 10.9.

== Naming ==
This minor planet was named by the discoverer after the parents-in-law of his brother, E. Reinmuth. The official naming citation was mentioned in The Names of the Minor Planets by Paul Herget in 1955 (H 119).
