= 937 Bethgea =

Main-belt asteroid

Discovery
- Discovered by: K. Reinmuth
- Discovery site: Heidelberg
- Discovery date: 12 September 1920

Designations
- Pronunciation: /ˈbɛθɡiə/
- Alternative designations: 1920 HO; A916 GA; 1946 GC; 1959 EQ

Orbital characteristics
- Epoch 31 July 2016 (JD 2457600.5)
- Uncertainty parameter 0
- Observation arc: 99.97 yr (36513 days)
- Aphelion: 2.7160 AU (406.31 Gm)
- Perihelion: 1.7473 AU (261.39 Gm)
- Semi-major axis: 2.2317 AU (333.86 Gm)
- Eccentricity: 0.21703
- Orbital period (sidereal): 3.33 yr (1217.7 d)
- Mean anomaly: 296.008°
- Mean motion: 0° 17^{m} 44.304^{s} / day
- Inclination: 3.6963°
- Longitude of ascending node: 243.574°
- Argument of perihelion: 72.509°

Physical characteristics
- Synodic rotation period: 8.356 h, 7.5390 h (0.31413 d)
- Absolute magnitude (H): 11.83

937 Bethgea is a background asteroid from the inner region of the asteroid belt. It was discovered on 12 September 1920 by German astronomer Karl Wilhelm Reinmuth, from Heidelberg.

Photometric observations of this asteroid made at the Torino Observatory in Italy during 1990–1991 were used to determine a synodic rotation period of 8.356 ± 0.006 hours.
