= 2637 Bobrovnikoff =

Asteroid

Discovery
- Discovered by: K. Reinmuth
- Discovery site: Heidelberg Obs.
- Discovery date: 22 September 1919

Designations
- Named after: Nicholas T. Bobrovnikoff (Russian-born astronomer)
- Alternative designations: A919 SB · 1953 TL; 1963 RB · 1976 JB_{7} 1980 TN_{3}
- Minor planet category: main-belt · (inner) background

Orbital characteristics
- Epoch 23 March 2018 (JD 2458200.5)
- Uncertainty parameter 0
- Observation arc: 98.35 yr (35,922 d)
- Aphelion: 2.7846 AU
- Perihelion: 1.7257 AU
- Semi-major axis: 2.2551 AU
- Eccentricity: 0.2348
- Orbital period (sidereal): 3.39 yr (1,237 d)
- Mean anomaly: 41.979°
- Mean motion: 0° 17^{m} 27.6^{s} / day
- Inclination: 4.9312°
- Longitude of ascending node: 356.13°
- Argument of perihelion: 343.65°

Physical characteristics
- Mean diameter: 5.82±0.95 km 5.97±1.05 km 6.21±0.10 km 6.919±0.094 km 7.46 km (calculated)
- Synodic rotation period: 4.7939±0.0003 h
- Geometric albedo: 0.20 (assumed); 0.2563±0.0191; 0.28±0.09; 0.316±0.061; 0.37±0.15
- Spectral type: S (assumed)
- Absolute magnitude (H): 12.90 · 13.0; 13.31±0.39 · 13.40

2637 Bobrovnikoff, provisional designation A919 SB, is a background asteroid from the inner regions of the asteroid belt, approximately 6 kilometers (4 miles) in diameter. It was discovered on 22 September 1919, by German astronomer Karl Reinmuth at the Heidelberg-Königstuhl State Observatory in Heidelberg, Germany. The presumed spherical S-type asteroid has a rotation period of 4.79 hours. It is named after astronomer Nicholas Bobrovnikoff, who was the director of the Perkins Observatory in Ohio, United States.

== Orbit and classification ==
Bobrovnikoff is a non-family asteroid from the main belt's background population. It orbits the Sun in the inner asteroid belt at a distance of 1.7–2.8 AU once every 3 years and 5 months (1,237 days; semi-major axis of 2.26 AU). Its orbit has an eccentricity of 0.23 and an inclination of 5° with respect to the ecliptic. The body's observation arc begins at Heidelberg in 1919, three days after its official discovery observation.

== Physical characteristics ==
Bobrovnikoff is an assumed, stony S-type asteroid.

=== Rotation period ===
In September 2007, a rotational lightcurve of Bobrovnikoff was obtained from photometric observations by French and Swiss astronomers Pierre Antonini, Raoul Behrend, and Alain Klotz. Lightcurve analysis gave a well-defined rotation period of 4.7939 hours with a brightness amplitude of 0.13 magnitude, indicative of a rather spherical shape (U=3).

=== Diameter and albedo ===
According to the survey carried out by the NEOWISE mission of NASA's Wide-field Infrared Survey Explorer, Bobrovnikoff measures between 5.82 and 6.919 kilometers in diameter and its surface has an albedo between 0.2563 and 0.37.

The Collaborative Asteroid Lightcurve Link assumes a standard albedo for stony asteroids of 0.20 and calculates a larger diameter of 7.46 kilometers based on an absolute magnitude of 13.0.

== Naming ==
This minor planet was named after Russian-born cometary spectroscopist Nicholas Theodore Bobrovnikoff (1896–1988), known for his research on the 1910-apparition of Halley's Comet. From 1934 to 1951, he was the director of the Perkins Observatory in Delaware, Ohio. The naming was proposed by the director of Minor Planet Center, Brian G. Marsden, and the official citation was published on 24 July 1983 (M.P.C. 8064).
