= 939 Isberga =

Main-belt asteroid

Discovery
- Discovered by: K. Reinmuth
- Discovery site: Heidelberg
- Discovery date: 4 October 1920

Designations
- Alternative designations: 1920 HR; 1930 QP; 1957 QE; 1957 UU

Orbital characteristics
- Epoch 31 July 2016 (JD 2457600.5)
- Uncertainty parameter 0
- Observation arc: 95.52 yr (34889 days)
- Aphelion: 2.6449 AU (395.67 Gm)
- Perihelion: 1.8501 AU (276.77 Gm)
- Semi-major axis: 2.2475 AU (336.22 Gm)
- Eccentricity: 0.17683
- Orbital period (sidereal): 3.37 yr (1230.7 d)
- Mean anomaly: 189.16°
- Mean motion: 0° 17^{m} 33.072^{s} / day
- Inclination: 2.5864°
- Longitude of ascending node: 327.137°
- Argument of perihelion: 5.9622°

Physical characteristics
- Dimensions: 10.39±0.18 km
- Synodic rotation period: 2.9173 h (0.12155 d)
- Absolute magnitude (H): 12.14

939 Isberga is an asteroid of the inner asteroid belt near the region of the Flora family. It was discovered from Heidelberg on 4 October 1920 by Karl Wilhelm Reinmuth. As was his common practice, Reinmuth gave the asteroid a feminine name without reference to any specific person.

Isberga rotates quickly, with a period of 2.9173 hours. It is also suspected to be a binary asteroid, due to a second periodicity observed in its lightcurve from 24 February to 4 March 2006. The secondary object has an orbital period of 26.8 hours, but its size is undetermined.
