= 1669 Dagmar =

Rare-type Themistian asteroid

Discovery
- Discovered by: K. Reinmuth
- Discovery site: Heidelberg Obs.
- Discovery date: 7 September 1934

Designations
- Named after: Generic name (common German name)
- Alternative designations: 1934 RS · 1943 GE; 1950 PX · 1953 AD; 1957 WA · 1959 CV; 1962 RH
- Minor planet category: main-belt · Themis

Orbital characteristics
- Epoch 4 September 2017 (JD 2458000.5)
- Uncertainty parameter 0
- Observation arc: 82.66 yr (30,190 days)
- Aphelion: 3.4870 AU
- Perihelion: 2.7920 AU
- Semi-major axis: 3.1395 AU
- Eccentricity: 0.1107
- Orbital period (sidereal): 5.56 yr (2,032 days)
- Mean anomaly: 126.58°
- Mean motion: 0° 10^{m} 37.92^{s} / day
- Inclination: 0.9409°
- Longitude of ascending node: 18.979°
- Argument of perihelion: 178.21°

Physical characteristics
- Dimensions: 35.78±2.4 km (IRAS:17); 42.377±0.188 km 42.99±2.86 km 43.00±0.77 km 45.194±0.620 km
- Mass: (3.98±0.80)×10^{16} kg
- Mean density: 0.95±0.27 g/cm^{3}
- Synodic rotation period: 12 h
- Geometric albedo: 0.0354±0.0061; 0.039±0.007; 0.0565±0.008 (IRAS:17)
- Spectral type: Tholen = G: · G: B–V = 0.730; U–B = 0.460
- Absolute magnitude (H): 10.91±0.18 · 10.97 (IRAS:17) · 10.97

1669 Dagmar, provisional designation 1934 RS, is a rare-type Themistian asteroid from the outer region of the asteroid belt, approximately 42 kilometers in diameter. It was discovered on 7 September 1934, by German astronomer Karl Reinmuth at Heidelberg Observatory in southern Germany, and named after a common German feminine name.

== Classification and orbit ==
The asteroid is a member of the Themis family, a large group of asteroids in the outer main-belt. It orbits the Sun at a distance of 2.8–3.5 AU once every 5 years and 7 months (2,032 days). Its orbit has an eccentricity of 0.11 and an inclination of 1° with respect to the ecliptic. As no precoveries were taken, and no prior identifications were made, Dagmar's observation arc begins with its official discovery observation.

== Physical characteristics ==
Dagmar has a rare spectra of a G-type asteroid (or Cg-type in the SMASS taxonomy), similar to 1 Ceres, the largest asteroid and only dwarf planet in the asteroid belt.

=== Rotation period ===
Astronomer Federico Manzini obtained a provisional lightcurve of Dagmar from photometric observations in March 2004. It gave a tentative rotation period of 12 hours with a brightness variation of 0.15 magnitude (U=1). As of 2017, no secure period has yet been published.

=== Diameter and albedo ===
According to the surveys carried out by the Infrared Astronomical Satellite IRAS, the Japanese Akari satellite, and NASA's Wide-field Infrared Survey Explorer with its subsequent NEOWISE mission, Dagmar measures between 35.78 and 45.194 kilometers in diameter, and its surface has an albedo between 0.035 and 0.057. The Collaborative Asteroid Lightcurve Link adopts the results obtained by 17 observations made by IRAS, that is an albedo of 0.0565 and a diameter of 35.78 kilometers with an absolute magnitude of 10.97.

== Naming ==
This minor planet was named by the discoverer after a common German feminine name. No special meaning is assigned to this name. The official naming citation was published by the Minor Planet Center on 15 December 1968 (M.P.C. 2901).
