= 1818 Brahms =

Main-belt asteroid

Discovery
- Discovered by: K. Reinmuth
- Discovery site: Heidelberg Obs.
- Discovery date: 15 August 1939

Designations
- Named after: Johannes Brahms (German composer)
- Alternative designations: 1939 PE · 1936 TF; 1955 SU · 1955 TN; 1955 UC · A904 RE
- Minor planet category: main-belt · (inner)

Orbital characteristics
- Epoch 4 September 2017 (JD 2458000.5)
- Uncertainty parameter 0
- Observation arc: 112.50 yr (41,092 days)
- Aphelion: 2.5504 AU
- Perihelion: 1.7770 AU
- Semi-major axis: 2.1637 AU
- Eccentricity: 0.1787
- Orbital period (sidereal): 3.18 yr (1,163 days)
- Mean anomaly: 194.32°
- Mean motion: 0° 18^{m} 34.92^{s} / day
- Inclination: 2.9782°
- Longitude of ascending node: 249.48°
- Argument of perihelion: 74.560°

Physical characteristics
- Dimensions: 8±3 km (generic)
- Absolute magnitude (H): 13.8

1818 Brahms, provisional designation 1939 PE, is an asteroid from the inner regions of the asteroid belt, approximately 6 kilometers in diameter. It was discovered on 15 August 1939, by German astronomer Karl Reinmuth at Heidelberg Observatory in southern Germany. The asteroid was named after composer Johannes Brahms.

== Orbit and classification ==
Brahms orbits the Sun in the inner main-belt at a distance of 1.8–2.6 AU once every 3 years and 2 months (1,163 days). Its orbit has an eccentricity of 0.18 and an inclination of 3° with respect to the ecliptic. Brahms was first identified as A904 RE at the discovering observatory in 1904, extending the body's observation arc by 35 years prior to its official discovery observation.

== Physical characteristics ==
As of 2017, Brahms's effective size, albedo and spectral type, as well as its rotation period and shape remain unknown. Based on a magnitude-to-diameter conversion, its generic diameter is between 5 and 11 kilometer for an absolute magnitude of 13.8, and an assumed albedo in the range of 0.05 to 0.25. Since asteroids in the inner main-belt are typically of stony rather than carbonaceous composition, with albedos of 0.20 or higher, Brahms's diameter can be estimated at around 6 kilometers, as the higher its albedo (reflectivity), the lower the body's diameter at a constant absolute magnitude (brightness).

== Naming ==
This minor planet is named for the German composer Johannes Brahms (1833–1897). The official naming citation was published by the Minor Planet Center on 20 February 1976 (M.P.C. 3935).
