= 1047 Geisha =

Florian asteroid

Discovery
- Discovered by: K. Reinmuth
- Discovery site: Heidelberg Obs.
- Discovery date: 17 November 1924

Designations
- Named after: The Geisha (British musical)
- Alternative designations: 1924 TE · 1932 BP; 1941 YG · 1947 NC; 1950 JF · 1974 HU_{2} A916 HB
- Minor planet category: main-belt · (inner); Flora

Orbital characteristics
- Epoch 4 September 2017 (JD 2458000.5)
- Uncertainty parameter 0
- Observation arc: 92.63 yr (33,833 d)
- Aphelion: 2.6723 AU
- Perihelion: 1.8094 AU
- Semi-major axis: 2.2409 AU
- Eccentricity: 0.1925
- Orbital period (sidereal): 3.35 yr (1,225 days)
- Mean anomaly: 256.96°
- Mean motion: 0° 17^{m} 37.68^{s} / day
- Inclination: 5.6667°
- Longitude of ascending node: 78.223°
- Argument of perihelion: 300.39°

Physical characteristics
- Dimensions: 9.96±2.15 km 10.555±0.095 km 10.729±0.112 km 11.52 km (calculated)
- Synodic rotation period: 25.62±0.02 h
- Geometric albedo: 0.24 (assumed); 0.277±0.029; 0.2897±0.0802; 0.30±0.13
- Spectral type: Tholen = S · S B–V = 0.913; U–B = 0.541
- Absolute magnitude (H): 11.86 · 12.20

1047 Geisha, provisional designation 1924 TE, is a stony Florian asteroid from the inner regions of the asteroid belt, approximately 11 kilometers in diameter. It was discovered on 17 November 1924, by German astronomer Karl Reinmuth at the Heidelberg-Königstuhl State Observatory in southwest Germany. The asteroid was named after the British musical The Geisha.

== Orbit and classification ==
Geisha is a member of the Flora family (402), a giant asteroid family and the largest family of stony asteroids in the main-belt. It orbits the Sun in the inner main-belt at a distance of 1.8–2.7 AU once every 3 years and 4 months (1,225 days; semi-major axis 2.24 AU). Its orbit has an eccentricity of 0.19 and an inclination of 6° with respect to the ecliptic.

The asteroid was first observed as A916 HB at Heidelberg in April 1916. The body's observation arc begins with its official discovery observation in November 1924.

== Physical characteristics ==
In the Tholen classification, Geisha is stony S-type asteroid, which is also the overall spectral type for members of the Flora family.

=== Rotation period ===
In February 2006, a rotational lightcurve of Geisha was obtained from photometric observations by Italian amateur astronomer Laurent Bernasconi. Lightcurve analysis gave a somewhat longer-than-average rotation period of 25.62 hours with a brightness amplitude of 0.33 magnitude (U=3-).

=== Diameter and albedo ===
According to the survey carried out by the NEOWISE mission of NASA's Wide-field Infrared Survey Explorer, Geisha measures between 9.96 and 10.729 kilometers in diameter and its surface has an albedo between 0.277 and 0.30.

The Collaborative Asteroid Lightcurve Link assumes an albedo of 0.24 – derived from 8 Flora, namesake and parent body of the Flora family – and calculates a diameter of 11.52 kilometers based on an absolute magnitude of 11.86.

== Naming ==
This minor planet was named after the British musical The Geisha, a story of a tea house (1896). The official naming citation was mentioned in The Names of the Minor Planets by Paul Herget in 1955 (H 100).
