= 1259 Ógyalla =

Themistian asteroid

Discovery
- Discovered by: K. Reinmuth
- Discovery site: Heidelberg Obs.
- Discovery date: 29 January 1933

Designations
- Named after: Hurbanovo Observatory (551) (formerly O'Gyalla Observatory)
- Alternative designations: 1933 BT · 1928 DJ_{1} 1928 FO · 1929 MA; 1935 QE_{1} · 1949 YN; 1956 JF
- Minor planet category: main-belt · Themis

Orbital characteristics
- Epoch 4 September 2017 (JD 2458000.5)
- Uncertainty parameter 0
- Observation arc: 89.36 yr (32,640 days)
- Aphelion: 3.5000 AU
- Perihelion: 2.7064 AU
- Semi-major axis: 3.1032 AU
- Eccentricity: 0.1279
- Orbital period (sidereal): 5.47 yr (1,997 days)
- Mean anomaly: 94.460°
- Mean motion: 0° 10^{m} 49.08^{s} / day
- Inclination: 2.3810°
- Longitude of ascending node: 75.001°
- Argument of perihelion: 149.89°

Physical characteristics
- Dimensions: 26.59±7.87 km 31.32±1.13 km 33.13±1.6 km 33.31 km (derived); 36.111±0.510 km 39.484±0.440 km
- Synodic rotation period: 12 h (dated); 17.2669±0.1183 h (S); 17.3038±0.0573 h (R); 17.334±0.004 h
- Geometric albedo: 0.0451±0.0103; 0.0641±0.007; 0.066±0.019; 0.072±0.006; 0.0916 (derived); 0.10±0.05
- Spectral type: S
- Absolute magnitude (H): 10.349±0.002 (R) · 10.6 · 10.64 · 10.678±0.003 (S) · 11.0

1259 Ógyalla, provisional designation 1933 BT, is a Themistian asteroid from the outer region of the asteroid belt, approximately 32 kilometers in diameter. It was discovered on 29 January 1933, by German astronomer Karl Reinmuth at Heidelberg Observatory in southwest Germany. The asteroid was named for the Hurbanovo Observatory (551).

== Orbit and classification ==
Ógyalla is a member of the Themis family, the 9th largest main-belt asteroid family of nearly 5,000 asteroids with nearly coplanar ecliptical orbits. It orbits the Sun in the outer main-belt at a distance of 2.7–3.5 AU once every 5 years and 6 months (1,997 days). Its orbit has an eccentricity of 0.13 and an inclination of 2° with respect to the ecliptic. It was first identified as 1928 DJ_{1} and 1928 FO at the discovering observatory in 1928, extending the asteroid's observation arc by 5 years prior to its official discovery observation.

== Physical characteristics ==
=== Rotation period ===
A rotational lightcurve of Ógyalla was obtained by the Spanish Photometric Asteroid Analysis Group (OBAS) in June 2016. Light curve analysis gave a well-defined rotation period of 17.334 hours with a brightness variation of 0.41 magnitude (U=3). In September 2012, photometric observations at the Palomar Transient Factory gave a period of 17.2669 and 17.3038 hours with an amplitude of 0.27 and 0.25 in the R- and S-band, respectively (U=2/2).

The first lightcurve was already obtained in 1974, by Swedish astronomer Claes-Ingvar Lagerkvist at Uppsala Observatory from photographic photometry, but it was only fragmentary and gave a tentative period of 12 hours (U=1).

=== Diameter and albedo ===
According to the surveys carried out by the Infrared Astronomical Satellite IRAS, the Japanese Akari satellite, and NASA's Wide-field Infrared Survey Explorer with its subsequent NEOWISE mission, Ógyalla measures between 26.59 and 36.11 kilometers in diameter, and its surface has an albedo between 0.064 and 0.10 (without preliminary results). The Collaborative Asteroid Lightcurve Link (CALL) derives an albedo of 0.0916 and a diameter of 33.31 kilometers based on an absolute magnitude of 10.6. CALL also classifies it as a stony S-type asteroid (as it does with all Themistians).

== Naming ==
This minor planet was named for the Hurbanovo Observatory (IAU code: 551; formerly known as O'Gyalla Observatory), a seismological, meteorological and astronomical observatory in the former Hungarian city of Ógyalla. Since 1948, the city belongs to Slovakia and is now known as Hurbanovo. The official naming citation was mentioned in The Names of the Minor Planets by Paul Herget in 1955 (H 116).
