= 1070 Tunica =

Dark background asteroid

Discovery
- Discovered by: K. Reinmuth
- Discovery site: Heidelberg Obs.
- Discovery date: 1 September 1926

Designations
- Pronunciation: /ˈtjuːnɪkə/
- Named after: Petrorhagia (flowering plant)
- Alternative designations: 1926 RB · A903 SA
- Minor planet category: main-belt · (outer) background · Ursula

Orbital characteristics
- Epoch 4 September 2017 (JD 2458000.5)
- Uncertainty parameter 0
- Observation arc: 114.03 yr (41,649 days)
- Aphelion: 3.4882 AU
- Perihelion: 2.9764 AU
- Semi-major axis: 3.2323 AU
- Eccentricity: 0.0792
- Orbital period (sidereal): 5.81 yr (2,123 days)
- Mean anomaly: 259.51°
- Mean motion: 0° 10^{m} 10.56^{s} / day
- Inclination: 16.963°
- Longitude of ascending node: 165.32°
- Argument of perihelion: 189.81°

Physical characteristics
- Dimensions: 33.77±8.89 km 33.79 km (calculated); 36.68±0.86 km 39.10±0.64 km 39.131±0.423 km 44.135±1.028 km
- Synodic rotation period: 15.673±0.0067 h 15.8±1.0 h
- Geometric albedo: 0.0476±0.0014; 0.057 (assumed); 0.061±0.003; 0.068±0.003; 0.07±0.04; 0.076±0.011
- Spectral type: C (assumed)
- Absolute magnitude (H): 10.60 · 10.634±0.001 (R) · 10.70 · 10.76±0.29 · 10.8 · 11.08

1070 Tunica, provisional designation 1926 RB, is a dark background asteroid from the outer regions of the asteroid belt, approximately 35 kilometers in diameter. It was discovered on 1 September 1926, by German astronomer Karl Reinmuth at the Heidelberg-Königstuhl State Observatory in southwest Germany. The asteroid was named after Petrorhagia, a flowering plant also known as "Tunica".

== Orbit and classification ==
Tunica is a non-family asteroid from the main belt's background population. Conversely, it has also been considered a core member of the Ursula family. It orbits the Sun in the outer main-belt at a distance of 3.0–3.5 AU once every 5 years and 10 months (2,123 days; semi-major axis of 3.23 AU). Its orbit has an eccentricity of 0.08 and an inclination of 17° with respect to the ecliptic.

The body's observation arc begins with its identification as A903 SA at Heidelberg in September 1903, or 23 years prior to its official discovery observation.

== Physical characteristics ==
Tunica is an assumed C-type asteroid.

=== Rotation period ===
In May 2017, a rotational lightcurve of Tunica was obtained from photometric observations by French amateur astronomer René Roy. Lightcurve analysis gave a rotation period of 15.8 hours with a brightness variation of 0.24 magnitude (U=2-). Another lightcurve obtained in the R-band by astronomers at the Palomar Transient Factory in February 2010 gave a period of 15.673 hours and an amplitude of 0.32 magnitude (U=2).

=== Diameter and albedo ===
According to the surveys carried out by the Japanese Akari satellite and the NEOWISE mission of NASA's Wide-field Infrared Survey Explorer, Tunica measures between 33.77 and 44.135 kilometers in diameter and its surface has an albedo between 0.0476 and 0.076.

The Collaborative Asteroid Lightcurve Link assumes a standard albedo for carbonaceous asteroids of 0.057 and calculates a diameter of 33.79 kilometers based on an absolute magnitude of 11.08.

== Naming ==
This minor planet was named after "Tunica" (Petrorhagia), a flowering plant derived from the common gillyflower.

=== Reinmuth's flowers ===
Due to his many discoveries, Karl Reinmuth submitted a large list of 66 newly named asteroids in the early 1930s. The list covered his discoveries with numbers between (1009) and (1200). This list also contained a sequence of 28 asteroids, starting with 1054 Forsytia, that were all named after plants, in particular flowering plants (also see list of minor planets named after animals and plants).
