= 1157 Arabia =

Main-belt asteroid

Discovery
- Discovered by: K. Reinmuth
- Discovery site: Heidelberg Obs.
- Discovery date: 31 August 1929

Designations
- Named after: Arabian Peninsula
- Alternative designations: 1929 QC · 1955 EC
- Minor planet category: main-belt · (outer) background

Orbital characteristics
- Epoch 4 September 2017 (JD 2458000.5)
- Uncertainty parameter 0
- Observation arc: 87.58 yr (31,987 days)
- Aphelion: 3.6412 AU
- Perihelion: 2.7221 AU
- Semi-major axis: 3.1816 AU
- Eccentricity: 0.1444
- Orbital period (sidereal): 5.68 yr (2,073 days)
- Mean anomaly: 195.98°
- Mean motion: 0° 10^{m} 25.32^{s} / day
- Inclination: 9.5447°
- Longitude of ascending node: 336.19°
- Argument of perihelion: 313.37°

Physical characteristics
- Dimensions: 29.01±0.84 km 29.113±4.433 km 55.67 km (calculated)
- Synodic rotation period: 15.225±0.005 h (Note: Peter Caspari (2008) Minor Planet Lightcurve Analysis of 1157 Arabia and 1836 Komarov. Summary figures for (1157) Arabia at the LCDB)
- Geometric albedo: 0.057 (assumed); 0.211±0.013; 0.247±0.242
- Spectral type: C (assumed)
- Absolute magnitude (H): 9.82 · 9.89±0.22 · 10.00

1157 Arabia, provisional designation 1929 QC, is an asteroid from the outer regions of the asteroid belt, approximately 29 kilometers in diameter. Astronomer Karl Reinmuth discovered it at the Heidelberg Observatory in southwest Germany on 31 August 1929. The asteroid was named for the Arabian Peninsula.

== Orbit and classification ==
Arabia is a non-family asteroid from the main belt's background population. It orbits the Sun in the outer asteroid belt at a distance of 2.7–3.6 AU once every 5 years and 8 months (2,073 days). Its orbit has an eccentricity of 0.14 and an inclination of 10° with respect to the ecliptic.

The body's observation arc begins at Heidelberg in December 1930, more than a year after its official discovery observation.

== Physical characteristics ==
Arabia is an assumed carbonaceous C-type asteroid, while the measured albedos are rather typical for a stony composition (see below).

=== Rotation period ===
In June 2008, Peter Caspari obtained a rotational lightcurve of Arabia from photometric observations at the BDI Observatory (E18) near Sydney, Australia. Lightcurve analysis gave a rotation period of 15.225 hours with a brightness amplitude of 0.37 magnitude (U=3-).

=== Diameter and albedo ===
According to the surveys carried out by the Japanese Akari satellite and the NEOWISE mission of NASA's Wide-field Infrared Survey Explorer, Arabia measures 29.01 and 29.113 kilometers in diameter and its surface has an albedo of 0.211 and 0.247, respectively. The Collaborative Asteroid Lightcurve Link assumes a standard albedo for carbonaceous asteroids of 0.057 and calculates a much larger diameter of 55.67 kilometers based on an absolute magnitude of 10.0.

== Naming ==
This minor planet was named after the Arabian Peninsula, also known as "Arabia", in Western Asia. The official naming citation was mentioned in The Names of the Minor Planets by Paul Herget in 1955 (H 108).
