= 935 Clivia =

Main-belt asteroid

Discovery
- Discovered by: K. Reinmuth
- Discovery site: Heidelberg
- Discovery date: 7 September 1920

Designations
- Pronunciation: /ˈklaɪviə/
- Alternative designations: 1920 HM; 1950 UB

Orbital characteristics
- Epoch 31 July 2016 (JD 2457600.5)
- Uncertainty parameter 0
- Observation arc: 95.60 yr (34917 days)
- Aphelion: 2.5437 AU (380.53 Gm)
- Perihelion: 1.8941 AU (283.35 Gm)
- Semi-major axis: 2.2189 AU (331.94 Gm)
- Eccentricity: 0.14639
- Orbital period (sidereal): 3.31 yr (1207.3 d)
- Mean anomaly: 318.933°
- Mean motion: 0° 17^{m} 53.52^{s} / day
- Inclination: 4.0252°
- Longitude of ascending node: 346.505°
- Argument of perihelion: 57.990°

Physical characteristics
- Mean radius: 3.935±0.35 km
- Synodic rotation period: 3.6222 h (0.15093 d)
- Geometric albedo: 0.1974±0.037
- Absolute magnitude (H): 12.9

935 Clivia belongs to the Flora family of Main Belt asteroids. Its diameter is about 7.9 km and it has an albedo of 0.197.
