= 1056 Azalea =

Florian asteroid

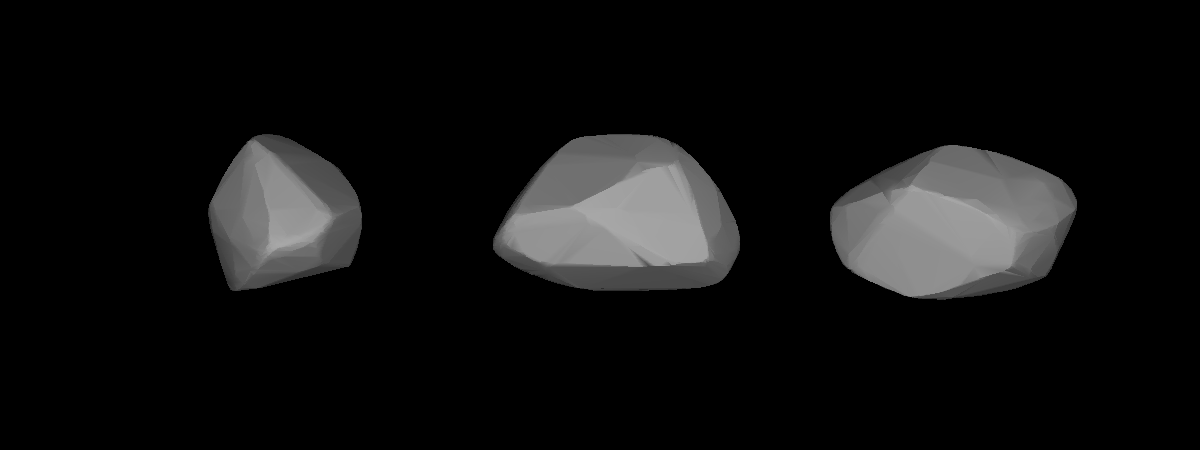
- Light curve-based 3D-model of 1056 Azalea

Discovery
- Discovered by: K. Reinmuth
- Discovery site: Heidelberg Obs.
- Discovery date: 31 January 1924

Designations
- Pronunciation: /əˈzeɪliə/ ə-ZAY-lee-ə
- Named after: Azalea (flower)
- Alternative designations: 1924 QD · 1925 NA; 1929 WX
- Minor planet category: main-belt · (inner); Flora

Orbital characteristics
- Epoch 4 September 2017 (JD 2458000.5)
- Uncertainty parameter 0
- Observation arc: 93.24 yr (34,057 days)
- Aphelion: 2.6277 AU
- Perihelion: 1.8321 AU
- Semi-major axis: 2.2299 AU
- Eccentricity: 0.1784
- Orbital period (sidereal): 3.33 yr (1,216 days)
- Mean anomaly: 226.32°
- Mean motion: 0° 17^{m} 45.6^{s} / day
- Inclination: 5.4267°
- Longitude of ascending node: 104.17°
- Argument of perihelion: 212.39°

Physical characteristics
- Dimensions: 10.66±1.99 km 11.76±0.54 km 11.869±0.136 km 12.40 km (calculated); 12.984±0.069 km 13.07±0.64 km
- Synodic rotation period: 15.0276 h 15.03±0.05 h 15.15±0.03 h
- Geometric albedo: 0.223±0.024; 0.24 (assumed); 0.2457±0.0401; 0.292±0.040; 0.34±0.16
- Spectral type: SMASS = S · S
- Absolute magnitude (H): 11.60 · 11.70 · 11.73±0.28 · 11.83

1056 Azalea, provisional designation 1924 QD, is a stony Florian asteroid from the inner regions of the asteroid belt, approximately 12 kilometers in diameter. It was discovered on 31 January 1924, by astronomer Karl Reinmuth at the Heidelberg-Königstuhl State Observatory in southwest Germany. The asteroid is named after the Azalea flower.

== Orbit and classification ==
Azalea is a member of the Flora family (402), a giant asteroid family and the largest family of stony asteroids in the main belt. It orbits the Sun in the inner main belt at a distance of 1.8–2.6 AU once every 3 years and 4 months (1,216 days). Its orbit has an eccentricity of 0.18 and an inclination of 5° with respect to the ecliptic. The body's observation arc begins at Heidelberg in April 1928, more than 4 years after its official discovery observation.

== Physical characteristics ==
In the SMASS classification, Azalea is a common stony S-type asteroid.

=== Rotation period ===
In 2004, two rotational lightcurves of Azalea were obtained from photometric observations by a group of predominately Polish astronomers including Agnieszka Kryszczyńska, as well as by astronomers Alain Klotz and Raoul Behrend. Lightcurve analysis gave a rotation period of 15.03 and 15.15 hours with a high brightness variation of 0.70 and 0.79 magnitude, respectively (U=2/2). The high brightness amplitude is typically indicative for a non-spheroidal shape.

=== Spin axis ===
In 2013, an international study modeled a lightcurve with a concurring period of 15.0276 hours and found two spin axis of (252.0°, 51.0°) and (64.0°, 41.0°) in ecliptic coordinates (λ, β) (U=n.a.).

=== Diameter and albedo ===
According to the surveys carried out by the Japanese Akari satellite and the NEOWISE mission of NASA's Wide-field Infrared Survey Explorer, Azalea measures between 10.66 and 13.07 kilometers in diameter and its surface has an albedo between 0.223 and 0.34.

The Collaborative Asteroid Lightcurve Link assumes an albedo of 0.24 – derived from 8 Flora, the largest member and namesake of the Flora family – and calculates a diameter of 12.40 kilometers based on an absolute magnitude of 11.7.

== Naming ==
This minor planet was named after the genus of flowering shrubs, Azalea, which are rhododendrons with funnel-shaped corollas. The official naming citation was mentioned in The Names of the Minor Planets by Paul Herget in 1955 (H 100).
