= 1298 Nocturna =

Main-belt asteroid

Discovery
- Discovered by: K. Reinmuth
- Discovery site: Heidelberg Obs.
- Discovery date: 7 January 1934

Designations
- Pronunciation: /nɒkˈtɜːrnə/
- Named after: nocturnus (Lat. nocturnal; nightly)
- Alternative designations: 1934 AE · A904 RA
- Minor planet category: main-belt · (outer)

Orbital characteristics
- Epoch 4 September 2017 (JD 2458000.5)
- Uncertainty parameter 0
- Observation arc: 112.66 yr (41,149 days)
- Aphelion: 3.5931 AU
- Perihelion: 2.6577 AU
- Semi-major axis: 3.1254 AU
- Eccentricity: 0.1496
- Orbital period (sidereal): 5.53 yr (2,018 days)
- Mean anomaly: 151.34°
- Mean motion: 0° 10^{m} 42.24^{s} / day
- Inclination: 5.4892°
- Longitude of ascending node: 299.99°
- Argument of perihelion: 58.719°

Physical characteristics
- Dimensions: 37.80±0.73 km 37.802±0.727 km 39.93 km (derived); 40.04±2.0 km 41.09±13.75 km 42.79±0.88 km 44.62±12.27 km
- Synodic rotation period: 34.80±0.07 h
- Geometric albedo: 0.04±0.02; 0.04±0.03; 0.0441 (derived); 0.051±0.002; 0.054±0.010; 0.0578±0.006
- Spectral type: X · C
- Absolute magnitude (H): 10.70 · 10.90 · 11.00 · 11.03 · 11.16±0.32

1298 Nocturna, provisional designation 1934 AE, is a dark asteroid from the outer regions of the asteroid belt, approximately 40 kilometers in diameter. It was discovered on 7 January 1934, by German astronomer Karl Reinmuth at the Heidelberg Observatory in southwest Germany. The asteroid's name is the Feminine adjective of nocturnus, "nightly".

== Orbit and classification ==
Nocturna is a non-family asteroid of the main belt's background population. It orbits the Sun in the outer asteroid belt at a distance of 2.7–3.6 AU once every 5 years and 6 months (2,018 days). Its orbit has an eccentricity of 0.15 and an inclination of 5° with respect to the ecliptic.

The asteroid was first identified as A904 RA at Heidelberg in September 1904. The body's observation arc begins 30 years later, with its official discovery observation at Heidelberg in 1934.

== Physical characteristics ==
Nocturna has been characterized as an X-type asteroid by PanSTARRS photometric survey. It is also an assumed carbonaceous C-type asteroid.

=== Rotation period ===
In February 2006, a rotational lightcurve of Nocturna was obtained from photometric observations by French amateur astronomer René Roy. Lightcurve analysis gave a rotation period of 34.80 hours with a brightness amplitude of 0.11 magnitude (U=2). Nocturna has a longer-than-average period, as most asteroids rotate within less than 20 hours once around their axis.

=== Diameter and albedo ===
According to the surveys carried out by the Infrared Astronomical Satellite IRAS, the Japanese Akari satellite and the NEOWISE mission of NASA's Wide-field Infrared Survey Explorer, Nocturna measures between 37.80 and 44.62 kilometers in diameter and its surface has an albedo between 0.04 and 0.0578.

The Collaborative Asteroid Lightcurve Link derives an albedo of 0.0441 and a diameter of 39.93 kilometers based on an absolute magnitude of 11.0.

== Naming ==
This minor planet was named "Nocturna" after the feminine adjective of nocturnus which means "nightly". The name was proposed by German astronomer Gustave Stracke after whom an entire sequence of asteroids, (1227) to (1234), had been named indirectly. The official naming citation was mentioned in The Names of the Minor Planets by Paul Herget in 1955 (H 119).
