= 962 Aslög =

Main-belt asteroid

Discovery
- Discovered by: K. Reinmuth
- Discovery site: Heidelberg
- Discovery date: 25 October 1921

Designations
- Alternative designations: 1921 KP

Orbital characteristics
- Epoch 31 July 2016 (JD 2457600.5)
- Uncertainty parameter 0
- Observation arc: 94.35 yr (34461 days)
- Aphelion: 3.1952 AU (478.00 Gm)
- Perihelion: 2.6140 AU (391.05 Gm)
- Semi-major axis: 2.9046 AU (434.52 Gm)
- Eccentricity: 0.10006
- Orbital period (sidereal): 4.95 yr (1808.1 d)
- Mean anomaly: 68.7191°
- Mean motion: 0° 11^{m} 56.76^{s} / day
- Inclination: 2.6035°
- Longitude of ascending node: 145.631°
- Argument of perihelion: 223.081°

Physical characteristics
- Dimensions: 39.5 km
- Synodic rotation period: 5.465 h (0.2277 d)
- Absolute magnitude (H): 11.52

962 Aslög is a minor planet orbiting the Sun that was discovered by German astronomer Karl Wilhelm Reinmuth on 25 October 1921. Measurements of the lightcurve made in 2010 and 2011 give a rotation period of 5.465 ± 0.01 hours. It has a diameter of 39.5 km (24.5 mi).

This is a member of the dynamic Koronis family of asteroids that most likely formed as the result of a collisional breakup of a parent body.
