= 1010 Marlene =

Main-belt asteroid

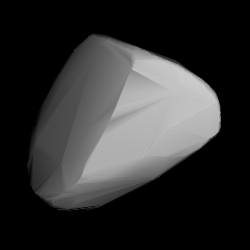
- Modelled shape of Marlene from its lightcurve

Discovery
- Discovered by: K. Reinmuth
- Discovery site: Heidelberg Obs.
- Discovery date: 12 November 1923

Designations
- Named after: Marlene Dietrich (German actress and singer)
- Alternative designations: 1923 PF · 1937 NB_{1} 1950 CJ · 1950 EY; A903 UD · A908 VA; 1923 PF
- Minor planet category: main-belt · (outer)

Orbital characteristics
- Epoch 4 September 2017 (JD 2458000.5)
- Uncertainty parameter 0
- Observation arc: 113.61 yr (41,495 days)
- Aphelion: 3.2329 AU
- Perihelion: 2.6278 AU
- Semi-major axis: 2.9303 AU
- Eccentricity: 0.1033
- Orbital period (sidereal): 5.02 yr (1,832 days)
- Mean anomaly: 265.92°
- Mean motion: 0° 11^{m} 47.4^{s} / day
- Inclination: 3.9070°
- Longitude of ascending node: 98.747°
- Argument of perihelion: 279.74°

Physical characteristics
- Dimensions: 43.38 km (derived); 43.47±1.1 km 46.37±0.51 km 46.876±0.165 km 47.07±0.75 km 49.74±17.50 km 51.085±0.156 km
- Synodic rotation period: 29.0±0.4 h 31.06±0.02 h (Note: Lightcurve plot of 1010 Marlene, Palmer Divide Observatory, Brian D. Warner (2005)); 31.0651±0.0005 h 31.066±0.005 h
- Geometric albedo: 0.03±0.02; 0.0468±0.0119; 0.047±0.007; 0.0540 (derived); 0.056±0.002; 0.0647±0.003
- Spectral type: C
- Absolute magnitude (H): 10.40 · 10.60 · 10.7

1010 Marlene (prov. designation: A923 VH or 1923 PF) is a carbonaceous background asteroid from the outer regions of the asteroid belt, approximately 47 kilometers in diameter. It was discovered on 12 November 1923, by astronomer Karl Reinmuth at the Heidelberg-Königstuhl State Observatory in southwest Germany. The asteroid was named after German actress and singer Marlene Dietrich.

== Classification and orbit ==
Marlene is not a member of any known asteroid family. It orbits the Sun in the outer main-belt at a distance of 2.6–3.2 AU once every 5.02 years (1,832 days). Its orbit has an eccentricity of 0.10 and an inclination of 4° with respect to the ecliptic.

The asteroid was first identified as A903 UD at the discovering observatory in October 1903. The body's observation arc begins at Heidelberg in January 1924, more than two months after its official discovery observation.

== Naming ==
This minor planet was named after German-born Marlene Dietrich (1901–1992), actor, singer and high-profile entertainer during World War II. The name was proposed by astronomer Gustav Stracke. The official naming citation was mentioned in The Names of the Minor Planets by Paul Herget in 1955 (H 97).

== Physical characteristics ==
Marlene is an assumed carbonaceous C-type asteroid.

=== Rotation period ===
Photometric measurements of Marlene – made by American astronomer Brian Warner at the Palmer Divide Observatory (716), Colorado, in February 2005 – showed a lightcurve with a longer-than average rotation period of 31.06±0.02 hours and a brightness variation of 0.32±0.02 in magnitude (U=2+). Most asteroids have periods shorter than 20 hours.

Another lightcurve, obtained by French amateur astronomer René Roy, gave a period of 29.0 hours and an amplitude of 0.17 magnitude (U=2).

=== Spin axis ===
In 2013 and 2016, an international study modeled a lightcurve with a concurring period of 31.0651 and 31.066 hours, respectively. The study also determined two spin axis of (299.0°, 42.0°) and (106.0°, 47.0°) in ecliptic coordinates (λ, β) (U=n.a.).

=== Diameter and albedo ===
According to the surveys carried out by the Infrared Astronomical Satellite IRAS, the Japanese Akari satellite and the NEOWISE mission of NASA's Wide-field Infrared Survey Explorer, Marlene measures between 43.47 and 51.085 kilometers in diameter and its surface has an albedo between 0.03 and 0.0647.

The Collaborative Asteroid Lightcurve Link derives an albedo of 0.054 and a diameter of 43.38 kilometers based on an absolute magnitude of 10.6.
