= 1159 Granada =

Dark background asteroid

Discovery
- Discovered by: K. Reinmuth
- Discovery site: Heidelberg Obs.
- Discovery date: 2 September 1929

Designations
- Named after: Granada (Spanish city and province)
- Alternative designations: 1929 RD · 1931 AR; 1940 RS
- Minor planet category: main-belt · (inner)

Orbital characteristics
- Epoch 4 September 2017 (JD 2458000.5)
- Uncertainty parameter 0
- Observation arc: 87.84 yr (32,083 days)
- Aphelion: 2.5184 AU
- Perihelion: 2.2409 AU
- Semi-major axis: 2.3797 AU
- Eccentricity: 0.0583
- Orbital period (sidereal): 3.67 yr (1,341 days)
- Mean anomaly: 35.176°
- Mean motion: 0° 16^{m} 6.6^{s} / day
- Inclination: 13.031°
- Longitude of ascending node: 347.89°
- Argument of perihelion: 313.33°

Physical characteristics
- Dimensions: 27.839±0.283 km 28.641±0.460 km 29.94 km (derived); 29.98±0.9 km 30.14±9.34 km 30.26±0.11 km 30.26±0.29 km 34.65±12.83 km
- Synodic rotation period: 31 h 72.852±0.2429 h
- Geometric albedo: 0.028±0.014; 0.031±0.002; 0.0379±0.0038; 0.04±0.00; 0.04±0.02; 0.0439 (derived); 0.047±0.001; 0.0471±0.003
- Spectral type: S (assumed); B–V = 0.680; U–B = 0.360
- Absolute magnitude (H): 11.385±0.001 (R) · 11.55 · 11.58 · 11.63 · 11.78±0.43 · 11.81

1159 Granada, provisional designation 1929 RD, is a dark background asteroid and relatively slow rotator from the inner regions of the asteroid belt, approximately 30 kilometers in diameter. It was discovered on 2 September 1929, by astronomer Karl Reinmuth at the Heidelberg Observatory in southwest Germany. The asteroid was named for the Spanish city and province of Granada.

== Orbit and classification ==
Granada is a background asteroid that does not belong to any known asteroid family. It orbits the Sun in the inner main-belt at a distance of 2.2–2.5 AU once every 3 years and 8 months (1,341 days). Its orbit has an eccentricity of 0.06 and an inclination of 13° with respect to the ecliptic. The body's observation arc begins nine days after its official discovery observation at Heidelberg.

== Physical characteristics ==
Although Granada is an assumed S-type asteroid, it has a notably low albedo (see below) for an asteroid of the inner main-belt, even below that of most carbonaceous asteroids.

=== Slow rotation ===
In September 1984, a rotational lightcurve of Granada was obtained from photometric observations by astronomer Richard Binzel. Lightcurve analysis gave a rotation period of 31 hours with a brightness variation of 0.28 magnitude (U=2). In October 2010, photometric observations in the R-band by astronomers at the Palomar Transient Factory gave a period of 72.852 hours and an amplitude of 0.24 (U=2). While not being a slow rotator, Granada's period is significantly longer than the typical 2 to 20 hours measures for most asteroids.

=== Diameter and albedo ===
According to the surveys carried out by the Infrared Astronomical Satellite IRAS, the Japanese Akari satellite and the NEOWISE mission of NASA's Wide-field Infrared Survey Explorer, Granada measures between 27.839 and 34.65 kilometers in diameter and its surface has a low albedo between 0.028 and 0.0471.

The Collaborative Asteroid Lightcurve Link derives an albedo of 0.0439 and a diameter of 29.94 kilometers based on an absolute magnitude of 11.63.

== Naming ==
This minor planet was named after Granada, city and province in Andalusia in southern. The official naming citation was mentioned in The Names of the Minor Planets by Paul Herget in 1955 (H 108).
