= 1665 Gaby =

Main-belt asteroid

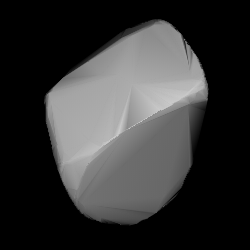
- Shape model of Gaby from its lightcurve

Discovery
- Discovered by: K. Reinmuth
- Discovery site: Heidelberg Obs.
- Discovery date: 27 February 1930

Designations
- Named after: Gaby Reinmuth (daughter-in-law of); Karl Reinmuth
- Alternative designations: 1930 DQ · 1941 BC; 1949 HS · 1951 WQ; 1957 KF
- Minor planet category: main-belt · (inner)

Orbital characteristics
- Epoch 4 September 2017 (JD 2458000.5)
- Uncertainty parameter 0
- Observation arc: 87.04 yr (31,793 days)
- Aphelion: 2.9145 AU
- Perihelion: 1.9128 AU
- Semi-major axis: 2.4136 AU
- Eccentricity: 0.2075
- Orbital period (sidereal): 3.75 yr (1,370 days)
- Mean anomaly: 165.86°
- Mean motion: 0° 15^{m} 46.08^{s} / day
- Inclination: 10.835°
- Longitude of ascending node: 91.543°
- Argument of perihelion: 5.9166°

Physical characteristics
- Dimensions: 10.746±0.179 km 10.960±0.021 km 11.009 km 11.01 km (taken)
- Synodic rotation period: 66±2 h 67.905±0.005 h 67.911±0.005 h
- Geometric albedo: 0.2532; 0.2681±0.0736; 0.278±0.049
- Spectral type: Tholen = S · S B–V = 0.848; U–B = 0.481
- Absolute magnitude (H): 11.85 · 11.9±0.2 · 12.19±0.97

1665 Gaby, provisional designation 1930 DQ, is a stony asteroid and a relatively slow rotator from the inner regions of the asteroid belt, approximately 11 kilometers in diameter. It was discovered on 27 February 1930, by German astronomer Karl Reinmuth at Heidelberg Observatory in southern Germany. It was later named after Gaby Reinmuth, the discoverer's daughter-in-law.

== Orbit and classification ==
Gaby orbits the Sun at a distance of 1.9–2.9 AU once every 3 years and 9 months (1,370 days). Its orbit has an eccentricity of 0.21 and an inclination of 11° with respect to the ecliptic. No precoveries were taken, and no prior identifications were made of Gaby. The body's observation arc begins 2 months after its official discovery observation at Heidelberg.

== Physical characteristics ==
In the Tholen classification, Gaby is a common S-type asteroid.

=== Lightcurves ===
In February 2005, French amateur astronomer Laurent Bernasconi obtained a rotational lightcurve of Gaby from photometric observations. It gave a rotation period of 66 hours with a brightness variation of 0.27 magnitude (U=2).

This is a longer-than average rotation, since most minor planets have a period between 2 and 20 hours (see list). In 2016, concurring sidereal periods of 67.905 and 67.911 hours were obtained from modeled photometric observations derived from the Lowell Photometric Database and other sources (U=n.a.).

=== Diameter and albedo ===
According to the survey carried out by NASA's Wide-field Infrared Survey Explorer with its subsequent NEOWISE mission, Gaby measures between 10.75 and 11.01 kilometers in diameter, and its surface has an albedo between 0.253 and 0.278. The Collaborative Asteroid Lightcurve Link adopts Petr Pravec's revised WISE data with an albedo of 0.2532 and a diameter of 11.01 kilometers using an absolute magnitude of 11.9±0.2.

== Naming ==
This minor planet was named by the discoverer for his daughter-in-law, Gaby Reinmuth. The official naming citation was published by the Minor Planet Center on 15 December 1968 (M.P.C. 2901).
