= 1370 Hella =

Main-belt asteroid

Discovery
- Discovered by: K. Reinmuth
- Discovery site: Heidelberg Obs.
- Discovery date: 31 August 1935

Designations
- Named after: Helene Nowacki (ARI-astronomer)
- Alternative designations: 1935 QG
- Minor planet category: main-belt · (inner); Flora

Orbital characteristics
- Epoch 4 September 2017 (JD 2458000.5)
- Uncertainty parameter 0
- Observation arc: 81.46 yr (29,754 days)
- Aphelion: 2.6343 AU
- Perihelion: 1.8665 AU
- Semi-major axis: 2.2504 AU
- Eccentricity: 0.1706
- Orbital period (sidereal): 3.38 yr (1,233 days)
- Mean anomaly: 130.52°
- Mean motion: 0° 17^{m} 31.2^{s} / day
- Inclination: 4.8039°
- Longitude of ascending node: 306.04°
- Argument of perihelion: 3.9960°

Physical characteristics
- Dimensions: 5.41 km (calculated)
- Synodic rotation period: 7.5408 h inconclusive
- Geometric albedo: 0.24 (assumed)
- Spectral type: S (assumed)
- Absolute magnitude (H): 13.5 · 13.69±0.63

1370 Hella, provisional designation 1935 QG, is a stony Florian asteroid from the inner regions of the asteroid belt, approximately 5.4 kilometers in diameter. It was discovered on 31 August 1935, by astronomer Karl Reinmuth at the Heidelberg-Königstuhl State Observatory in southwest Germany. The asteroid was named for Helene Nowacki, an astronomer at the Astronomical Calculation Institute.

== Orbit and classification ==
Hella is a member of the Flora family (402), a giant asteroid family and the largest family of stony asteroids in the main belt.

It orbits the Sun in the inner asteroid belt at a distance of 1.9–2.6 AU once every 3 years and 5 months (1,233 days). Its orbit has an eccentricity of 0.17 and an inclination of 5° with respect to the ecliptic. The body's observation arc begins at Heidelberg in September 1935, one month after its official discovery observation.

== Physical characteristics ==
According to its classification as a Florian asteroid, Hella is an assumed stony S-type asteroid.

=== Rotation period ===
In October 2006, a rotational lightcurve of Hella was obtained from photometric observations by French amateur astronomer Laurent Bernasconi. Lightcurve analysis gave an inconclusive rotation period of 7.5408 hours with a brightness amplitude of 0.17 magnitude (U=n.a.). The Lightcurve Data Base, however, only lists the measured brightness variation. As of 2017, no secure period of Hella has been obtained.

=== Diameter and albedo ===
Hella has not been observed by any of the space-based surveys, such as the Infrared Astronomical Satellite (IRAS), the Japanese Akari satellite or the NEOWISE mission of NASA's Wide-field Infrared Survey Explorer. The Collaborative Asteroid Lightcurve Link assumes an albedo of 0.24 – derived from 8 Flora the parent body of the Flora Family – and calculates a diameter of 5.41 kilometers based on an absolute magnitude of 13.5.

== Naming ==
This minor planet was named after Helene Nowacki (1904–1972), a German astronomer of the Astronomical Calculation Institute. The name was suggested by astronomer Gustav Stracke. The official naming citation was mentioned in The Names of the Minor Planets by Paul Herget in 1955 (H 124).
