= 1174 Marmara =

Main belt asteroid

Discovery
- Discovered by: K. Reinmuth
- Discovery site: Heidelberg Obs.
- Discovery date: 17 October 1930

Designations
- Named after: Sea of Marmara (Bosporus/Dardanelles)
- Alternative designations: 1930 UC
- Minor planet category: main-belt · (outer) · Eos

Orbital characteristics
- Epoch 4 September 2017 (JD 2458000.5)
- Uncertainty parameter 0
- Observation arc: 86.72 yr (31,673 days)
- Aphelion: 3.3607 AU
- Perihelion: 2.6956 AU
- Semi-major axis: 3.0281 AU
- Eccentricity: 0.1098
- Orbital period (sidereal): 5.27 yr (1,925 days)
- Mean anomaly: 227.47°
- Mean motion: 0° 11^{m} 13.2^{s} / day
- Inclination: 10.074°
- Longitude of ascending node: 1.0132°
- Argument of perihelion: 351.99°

Physical characteristics
- Dimensions: 16.21±1.6 km 16.46 km (derived); 17.01±3.92 km 17.18±1.10 km 17.77±4.33 km 18.142±0.159 km 18.496±0.180 km
- Synodic rotation period: 12 h
- Geometric albedo: 0.0821±0.0063; 0.086±0.025; 0.095±0.013; 0.1065±0.025; 0.13±0.11; 0.15±0.12; 0.1795 (derived)
- Spectral type: S
- Absolute magnitude (H): 11.40 · 11.49 · 11.5 · 11.73±0.27 · 12.0

1174 Marmara, provisional designation 1930 UC, is a stony Eoan asteroid from the outer regions of the asteroid belt, approximately 17 kilometers in diameter. It was discovered on 17 October 1930, by German astronomer Karl Reinmuth at Heidelberg Observatory in southwest Germany. The asteroid was later named after the Sea of Marmara, located between Europe and Asia.

== Classification and orbit ==
Marmara belongs to the Eos family (606), the largest asteroid family of the outer main-belt consisting of nearly 10,000 known members.

It orbits the Sun at a distance of 2.7–3.4 AU once every 5 years and 3 months (1,925 days). Its orbit has an eccentricity of 0.11 and an inclination of 10° with respect to the ecliptic. The asteroid's observation arc begins with its official discovery observation at Heidelberg.

== Physical characteristics ==
Marmara is an assumed S-type asteroid, while Eoan asteroids are typically characterized as K-type asteroids.

=== Lightcurves ===
Published in 2004, a rotational lightcurve of Marmara was obtained from photometric observations by South American astronomers from Brazil and Argentina. Lightcurve analysis gave a rotation period of 12 hours with a brightness amplitude of 0.2 magnitude (U=2).

=== Diameter and albedo ===
According to the surveys carried out by the Infrared Astronomical Satellite IRAS, the Japanese Akari satellite, and the NEOWISE mission of NASA's Wide-field Infrared Survey Explorer, Marmara measures between 16.21 and 18.496 kilometers in diameter and its surface has an albedo between 0.0821 and 0.15. The Collaborative Asteroid Lightcurve Link derives a higher albedo of 0.1795 and a diameter of 16.46 kilometers based on an absolute magnitude of 11.4.

== Naming ==
This minor planet was named by the discoverer after the Sea of Marmara, which lies in between the Black Sea and the Aegean Sea, connected by the Bosporus and the Dardanelles straits, respectively. The official naming citation was published in Paul Herget's The Names of the Minor Planets in 1955 (H 109).
