= 796 Sarita =

Minor planet

Discovery
- Discovered by: K. Reinmuth
- Discovery site: Heidelberg Obs.
- Discovery date: 15 October 1914

Designations
- Alternative designations: 1914 VH

Orbital characteristics
- Epoch 31 July 2016 (JD 2457600.5)
- Uncertainty parameter 0
- Observation arc: 101.51 yr (37076 d)
- Aphelion: 3.4777 AU (520.26 Gm)
- Perihelion: 1.7910 AU (267.93 Gm)
- Semi-major axis: 2.6344 AU (394.10 Gm)
- Eccentricity: 0.32012
- Orbital period (sidereal): 4.28 yr (1561.8 d)
- Mean anomaly: 300.91°
- Mean motion: 0° 13^{m} 49.836^{s} / day
- Inclination: 19.052°
- Longitude of ascending node: 33.194°
- Argument of perihelion: 329.694°

Physical characteristics
- Mean radius: 22.48±0.75 km
- Synodic rotation period: 8.1755 h (0.34065 d)
- Geometric albedo: 0.1966±0.013
- Spectral type: XD (Tholen), M (Rivkin)
- Absolute magnitude (H): 9.12

796 Sarita is a minor planet orbiting the Sun. It was discovered 15 October 1914 by German astronomer Karl W. Reinmuth. This is a main belt that is orbiting at a radius of 2.63 AU with a period of 4.28 yr and an eccentricity (ovalness) of 0.32. The orbital plane is inclined at an angle of 19.052° from the plane of the ecliptic. Tholen (1989) initially classified it as type XD, although later authors treated it as an M-class body. The object's visual albedo is considered characteristic of the latter type. It has a significantly higher radar albedo than most main belt objects, which also suggests a higher metallic content.
