= 963 Iduberga =

Main-belt asteroid

Discovery
- Discovered by: K. Reinmuth
- Discovery site: Heidelberg
- Discovery date: 26 October 1921

Designations
- Alternative designations: 1921 KR; A911 WA; 1929 BA; 1931 TE3; 1950 HV

Orbital characteristics
- Epoch 31 July 2016 (JD 2457600.5)
- Uncertainty parameter 0
- Observation arc: 94.16 yr (34391 days)
- Aphelion: 2.5556 AU (382.31 Gm)
- Perihelion: 1.9393 AU (290.12 Gm)
- Semi-major axis: 2.2475 AU (336.22 Gm)
- Eccentricity: 0.13710
- Orbital period (sidereal): 3.37 yr (1230.7 d)
- Mean anomaly: 17.4320°
- Mean motion: 0° 17^{m} 33.072^{s} / day
- Inclination: 7.9811°
- Longitude of ascending node: 62.490°
- Argument of perihelion: 5.2725°

Physical characteristics
- Synodic rotation period: 3.0341 h (0.12642 d)
- Absolute magnitude (H): 12.49

963 Iduberga is an S-type asteroid from the asteroid belt's background population. Its rotation period is a relatively rapid 3.02 hours.
