= 2942 Cordie =

Main-belt asteroid

Discovery
- Discovered by: K. Reinmuth
- Discovery site: Heidelberg Obs.
- Discovery date: 29 January 1932

Designations
- Named after: Cordie Robinson
- Alternative designations: 1932 BG · 1936 KF; 1976 GS_{6} · 1982 BG_{2}
- Minor planet category: main-belt

Orbital characteristics
- Epoch 4 September 2017 (JD 2458000.5)
- Uncertainty parameter 0
- Observation arc: 84.57 yr (30,890 days)
- Aphelion: 2.5826 AU
- Perihelion: 1.8949 AU
- Semi-major axis: 2.2388 AU
- Eccentricity: 0.1536
- Orbital period (sidereal): 3.35 yr (1,224 days)
- Mean anomaly: 84.621°
- Mean motion: 0° 17^{m} 39.12^{s} / day
- Inclination: 6.8175°
- Longitude of ascending node: 116.39°
- Argument of perihelion: 154.85°

Physical characteristics
- Dimensions: 6.657±0.183 km
- Synodic rotation period: 80.0 h (3.33 d)
- Geometric albedo: 0.262±0.029
- Absolute magnitude (H): 13.0

2942 Cordie, provisional designation 1932 BG, is an asteroid from the inner regions of the asteroid belt, approximately 7 kilometers in diameter. It was discovered on 29 January 1932, by German astronomer Karl Reinmuth at Heidelberg Observatory in southwest Germany.

The asteroid has a long rotation period of roughly 80 hours. It was named after of Cordie Robinson, planetary geologist at the Harvard-Smithsonian Center for Astrophysics.
