= 1072 Malva =

Dark background asteroid

Discovery
- Discovered by: K. Reinmuth
- Discovery site: Heidelberg Obs.
- Discovery date: 4 October 1926

Designations
- Pronunciation: /ˈmælvə/
- Named after: Malva (flowering plant)
- Alternative designations: 1926 TA · 1949 UU
- Minor planet category: main-belt · (outer) background

Orbital characteristics
- Epoch 4 September 2017 (JD 2458000.5)
- Uncertainty parameter 0
- Observation arc: 91.08 yr (33,267 days)
- Aphelion: 3.9291 AU
- Perihelion: 2.4010 AU
- Semi-major axis: 3.1650 AU
- Eccentricity: 0.2414
- Orbital period (sidereal): 5.63 yr (2,057 days)
- Mean anomaly: 355.23°
- Mean motion: 0° 10^{m} 30^{s} / day
- Inclination: 8.0234°
- Longitude of ascending node: 37.077°
- Argument of perihelion: 25.996°

Physical characteristics
- Dimensions: 44.97 km (derived); 45.05±1.8 km 47.48±0.87 km 53.183±1.087 km 53.675±0.343 km
- Synodic rotation period: 9.0127±0.0003 h 10.080±0.005 h (Note: Lightcurve plot of 1072 Malva, Palmer Divide Observatory, B. D. Warner (2007). Summary figures at the LCDB)
- Geometric albedo: 0.032±0.005; 0.0394±0.0050; 0.0458 (derived); 0.050±0.002; 0.0549±0.005
- Spectral type: C (assumed)
- Absolute magnitude (H): 10.50 · 10.70 · 10.8

1072 Malva, provisional designation 1926 TA, is a dark background asteroid from the outer regions of the asteroid belt, approximately 48 kilometers in diameter. It was discovered on 4 October 1926, by astronomer Karl Reinmuth at the Heidelberg-Königstuhl State Observatory in Germany. The asteroid was named after the flowering plant Malva (mallow).

== Orbit and classification ==
Malva is a non-family asteroid from the main belt's background population. It orbits the Sun in the outer asteroid belt at a distance of 2.4–3.9 AU once every 5 years and 8 months (2,057 days; semi-major axis of 3.17 AU). Its orbit has an eccentricity of 0.24 and an inclination of 8° with respect to the ecliptic. The body's observation arc begins with its official discovery observation at Heidelberg in October 1926.

== Physical characteristics ==
Malva is an assumed C-type asteroid.

=== Rotation period ===
Observations performed by Brian Warner at the Palmer Divide Observatory in Colorado Springs, Colorado, during 2007 produced a lightcurve with a period of 10.080 ± 0.005 hours and a brightness range of 0.17 ± 0.02 in magnitude (U=3). Another lightcurve obtained by Italian amateur astronomers Roberto Crippa and Federico Manzini at the Sozzago Astronomical Station (A12) gave a period of 9.0127 hours with an amplitude of 0.17 magnitude (U=2).

=== Diameter and albedo ===
According to the surveys carried out by the Infrared Astronomical Satellite IRAS, the Japanese Akari satellite and the NEOWISE mission of NASA's Wide-field Infrared Survey Explorer, Malva measures between 45.05 and 53.675 kilometers in diameter and its surface has an albedo between 0.032 and 0.0549.

The Collaborative Asteroid Lightcurve Link derives an albedo of 0.0458 and a diameter of 44.97 kilometers based on an absolute magnitude of 10.7.

== Naming ==
This minor planet was named after the genus of flowering plants, Malva, also known as mallow. The official naming citation was mentioned in The Names of the Minor Planets by Paul Herget in 1955 (H 101).

=== Reinmuth's flowers ===
Due to his many discoveries, Karl Reinmuth submitted a large list of 66 newly named asteroids in the early 1930s. The list covered his discoveries with numbers between (1009) and (1200), and also contained a sequence of 28 asteroids, starting with 1054 Forsytia, that were all named after plants, in particular flowering plants (also see list of minor planets named after animals and plants).
