= 1409 Isko =

Main-belt asteroid

Discovery
- Discovered by: K. Reinmuth
- Discovery site: Heidelberg Obs.
- Discovery date: 8 January 1937

Designations
- Named after: Ise Koch (wife of astronomer); Fritz Kubach
- Alternative designations: 1937 AK · 1933 FG; 1935 SZ_{1} · 1951 GN; A900 UD
- Minor planet category: main-belt · (middle) background

Orbital characteristics
- Epoch 4 September 2017 (JD 2458000.5)
- Uncertainty parameter 0
- Observation arc: 116.70 yr (42,623 days)
- Aphelion: 2.8258 AU
- Perihelion: 2.5258 AU
- Semi-major axis: 2.6758 AU
- Eccentricity: 0.0561
- Orbital period (sidereal): 4.38 yr (1,599 days)
- Mean anomaly: 250.81°
- Mean motion: 0° 13^{m} 30.72^{s} / day
- Inclination: 6.7090°
- Longitude of ascending node: 177.56°
- Argument of perihelion: 207.79°

Physical characteristics
- Dimensions: 34.62±11.47 km 34.66±9.67 km 35.34 km (derived); 35.54±1.7 km 37.23±0.48 km 38.46±8.82 km
- Synodic rotation period: 11.6426±0.0007 h
- Geometric albedo: 0.032±0.016; 0.04±0.03; 0.05±0.05; 0.0514 (derived); 0.074±0.002; 0.0805±0.008
- Spectral type: C · C/S (assumed)
- Absolute magnitude (H): 10.60 · 10.89±0.29 · 11.10 · 11.15 · 11.42

1409 Isko (provisional designation 1937 AK) is a carbonaceous background asteroid from the central regions of the asteroid belt, approximately 35 kilometres (22 mi) in diameter. It was discovered on 8 January 1937, by astronomer Karl Reinmuth at the Heidelberg-Königstuhl State Observatory in southwest Germany. The asteroid was named after Ise Koch, wife of astronomer Fritz Kubach.

== Orbit and classification ==
Isko is a non-family asteroid of the main belt's background population. It orbits the Sun in the central asteroid belt at a distance of 2.5–2.8 AU once every 4 years and 5 months (1,599 days). Its orbit has an eccentricity of 0.06 and an inclination of 7° with respect to the ecliptic.

The body's observation arc begins with its first identification as A900 UD at Heidelberg in October 1900, more than 36 years prior to its official discovery observation.

== Physical characteristics ==
Isko has been characterized as a carbonaceous C-type asteroid by Pan-STARRS photometric survey.

=== Rotation period ===
In December 2001, a rotational lightcurve of Isko was obtained from photometric observations by French amateur astronomers Laurent Bernasconi and René Roy. Lightcurve analysis gave a rotation period of 11.6426 hours with a brightness amplitude of 0.20 magnitude (U=2).

=== Diameter and albedo ===
According to the surveys carried out by the Infrared Astronomical Satellite IRAS, the Japanese Akari satellite and the NEOWISE mission of NASA's Wide-field Infrared Survey Explorer, Isko measures between 34.62 and 38.46 kilometres (21.51 and 23.90 mi) in diameter and its surface has an albedo between 0.032 and 0.0805.

The Collaborative Asteroid Lightcurve Link derives an albedo of 0.0514 and a diameter of 35.34 kilometres (21.96 mi) based on an absolute magnitude of 11.1.

== Naming ==
This minor planet was named after Ise Koch, wife of German astronomer Fritz Kubach (1912–1945)^{(de)} The official naming citation was mentioned in The Names of the Minor Planets by Paul Herget in 1955 (H 127).
