= 1759 Kienle =

Main-belt asteroid

Discovery
- Discovered by: K. Reinmuth
- Discovery site: Heidelberg Obs.
- Discovery date: 11 September 1942

Designations
- Named after: Hans Kienle (German astrophysicist)
- Alternative designations: 1942 RF · 1951 YY
- Minor planet category: main-belt · (middle) background

Orbital characteristics
- Epoch 27 April 2019 (JD 2458600.5)
- Uncertainty parameter 0
- Observation arc: 75.76 yr (27,671 d)
- Aphelion: 3.4829 AU
- Perihelion: 1.8201 AU
- Semi-major axis: 2.6515 AU
- Eccentricity: 0.3136
- Orbital period (sidereal): 4.32 yr (1,577 d)
- Mean anomaly: 268.08°
- Mean motion: 0° 13^{m} 41.88^{s} / day
- Inclination: 4.5585°
- Longitude of ascending node: 158.71°
- Argument of perihelion: 206.14°

Physical characteristics
- Mean diameter: 6.909±0.198 km 7.349±0.144 km
- Synodic rotation period: 29.25 h
- Geometric albedo: 0.1797; 0.203
- Spectral type: S (S3OS2)
- Absolute magnitude (H): 13.15

1759 Kienle, provisional designation 1942 RF, is a stony background asteroid from the central regions of the asteroid belt, approximately 7 kilometers (4.3 miles) in diameter. It was discovered on 11 September 1942, by astronomer Karl Reinmuth at the Heidelberg-Königstuhl State Observatory in southwest Germany. The S-type asteroid has a longer-than average rotation period of 29.3 hours. It was named for German astrophysicist Hans Kienle.

== Orbit and classification ==
Kienle is a non-family asteroid from the main belt's background population. It orbits the Sun in the central asteroid belt at a distance of 1.8–3.5 AU once every 4 years and 4 months (1,577 days; semi-major axis of 2.65 AU). Its orbit has an eccentricity of 0.31 and an inclination of 5° with respect to the ecliptic. The body's observation arc begins at with its official discovery observation during the height of World War II in September 1942.

== Naming ==
This minor planet was named after German astrophysicist Hans Kienle (1895–1975), known for his work on spectrophotometry and director of several German observatories, including the discovering Heidelberg Observatory (1950–1962). Kienle was also president of IAU Commission 36 during the 1950s. The official naming citation was published by the Minor Planet Center on 18 April 1977 (M.P.C. 4155).

== Physical characteristics ==
In both the Tholen- and SMASS-like taxonomy of the Small Solar System Objects Spectroscopic Survey (S3OS2), Kienle is a stony S-type asteroid.

=== Rotation period ===
During the early 1980s, a rotational lightcurve of Kienle was obtained from photometric observations by American astronomer Richard Binzel using the 0.91- and 2.1-meter telescopes at the University of Texas McDonald Observatory. Lightcurve analysis gave a rotation period of 29.25 hours with a brightness amplitude of 0.30 magnitude (U=2).

=== Diameter and albedo ===
According to the survey carried out by the NEOWISE mission of NASA's Wide-field Infrared Survey Explorer, Kienle measures between 6.9 and 7.3 kilometers in diameter and its surface has an albedo between 0.18 and 0.20. The Collaborative Asteroid Lightcurve Link assumes an albedo of 0.10 – a compromise figures between the stony inner- and carbonaceous outer-belt asteroids – and consequently calculates a larger diameter of 9.85 kilometers based on an absolute magnitude of 13.15.
