= 1163 Saga =

Main-belt asteroid

Discovery
- Discovered by: K. Reinmuth
- Discovery site: Heidelberg Obs.
- Discovery date: 20 January 1930

Designations
- Named after: Sagas (Norse mythological stories)
- Alternative designations: 1930 BA
- Minor planet category: main-belt · (outer)

Orbital characteristics
- Epoch 4 September 2017 (JD 2458000.5)
- Uncertainty parameter 0
- Observation arc: 87.49 yr (31,955 days)
- Aphelion: 3.3672 AU
- Perihelion: 3.0768 AU
- Semi-major axis: 3.2220 AU
- Eccentricity: 0.0451
- Orbital period (sidereal): 5.78 yr (2,112 days)
- Mean anomaly: 237.48°
- Mean motion: 0° 10^{m} 13.44^{s} / day
- Inclination: 9.0146°
- Longitude of ascending node: 127.72°
- Argument of perihelion: 197.44°

Physical characteristics
- Dimensions: 26.29±0.68 km 29.11±1.7 km 32.429±0.261 km 33.94±0.87 km 38.113±0.547 km
- Synodic rotation period: 9.278±0.001 h 9.365±0.006 h 9.394±0.0192 h
- Geometric albedo: 0.0640±0.0067; 0.097±0.006; 0.1199 (derived); 0.1200±0.015; 0.147±0.020
- Spectral type: S(assumed)
- Absolute magnitude (H): 10.548±0.003 (R) · 10.60 · 10.7 · 11.18±0.28

1163 Saga, provisionally designated 1930 BA, is a background asteroid from the outer regions of the asteroid belt, approximately 32 kilometers in diameter. It was discovered on 20 January 1930, by astronomer Karl Reinmuth at the Heidelberg-Königstuhl State Observatory in southwest Germany. The asteroid is named after the Sagas, a collection of stories from Norse mythology.

== Orbit and classification ==
Saga is classified as a background asteroid, indicating that it does not belong to any known asteroid family. It orbits the Sun in the outer main belt at a distance of 3.1–3.4 AU once every 5 years and 9 months (2,112 days). Its orbit has an eccentricity of 0.05 and an inclination of 9° with respect to the ecliptic. The body's observation arc begins at Heidelberg, six weeks after its official discovery observation.

== Physical characteristics ==
Saga is an presumed to be an S-type asteroid, although a wide range of measured albedos indicates otherwise (see below).

=== Rotation period ===
Since 2006, three rotational lightcurves of Saga have been obtained from photometric observations by French amateur astronomers Laurent Bernasconi and René Roy, as well as by astronomers at the Palomar Transient Factory in California. Lightcurve analysis gave a rotation period between 9.278 and 9.394 hours with a brightness amplitude of 0.25 to 0.33 magnitude (U=2+/3-/2).

=== Diameter and albedo ===
According to the surveys carried out by the Infrared Astronomical Satellite IRAS, the Japanese Akari satellite, and the NEOWISE mission of NASA's Wide-field Infrared Survey Explorer, Saga's diameter measures between 26.29 and 38.113 kilometers, and its surface has an albedo between 0.0640 and 0.147.

The Collaborative Asteroid Lightcurve Link derives an albedo of 0.1199 and adopts a diameter of 29.11 kilometers from IRAS with an absolute magnitude of 10.6.

== Naming ==
This minor planet was named after the Sagas, a collection of prose Norse mythological stories of ancient Scandinavian and Germanic history. It includes the early Viking voyages and is mostly written in Old Icelandic (Old Norse). The official naming citation was mentioned in The Names of the Minor Planets by Paul Herget in 1955 (H 108).
