= 1205 Ebella =

Main-belt asteroid

Discovery
- Discovered by: K. Reinmuth
- Discovery site: Heidelberg Obs.
- Discovery date: 6 October 1931

Designations
- Named after: Martin Ebell (German astronomer)
- Alternative designations: 1931 TB_{1} · 1970 JT
- Minor planet category: main-belt · (middle)

Orbital characteristics
- Epoch 4 September 2017 (JD 2458000.5)
- Uncertainty parameter 0
- Observation arc: 85.48 yr (31,221 days)
- Aphelion: 3.2287 AU
- Perihelion: 1.8411 AU
- Semi-major axis: 2.5349 AU
- Eccentricity: 0.2737
- Orbital period (sidereal): 4.04 yr (1,474 days)
- Mean anomaly: 103.87°
- Mean motion: 0° 14^{m} 39.12^{s} / day
- Inclination: 8.8616°
- Longitude of ascending node: 23.083°
- Argument of perihelion: 349.24°

Physical characteristics
- Dimensions: 5.474±0.283 km 6.0 km (est. at 0.20)
- Geometric albedo: 0.214±0.026
- Absolute magnitude (H): 13.5

1205 Ebella (provisional designation 1931 TB_{1}) is a relatively eccentric asteroid from the central regions of the asteroid belt, approximately 5.5 kilometers in diameter. It was discovered by astronomer Karl Reinmuth at Heidelberg Observatory on 6 October 1931. The asteroid was named after German astronomer Martin Ebell.

== Orbit and classification ==
Ebella orbits the Sun in the central main-belt at a distance of 1.8–3.2 AU once every 4.04 years (1,474 days). Its orbit has an eccentricity of 0.27 and an inclination of 9° with respect to the ecliptic. As no precoveries were taken and no prior identifications were made, the asteroid's observation arc begins at Heidelberg with its official discovery observation.

== Physical characteristics ==
=== Diameter and albedo ===
According to the survey carried out by NASA's Wide-field Infrared Survey Explorer with its subsequent NEOWISE mission, Ebella measures 5.474 kilometers in diameter and its surface has an albedo of 0.214, which is typical for stony S-type asteroids.

Based on a generic magnitude-to-diameter conversion, it measures 6.0 kilometers in diameter using an absolute magnitude of 13.50 with an assumed albedo of 0.20.

=== Lightcurve ===
As of 2017, no rotational lightcurve of Ebella has been obtained from photometric observations. The asteroid's rotation period, poles and shape still remain unknown.

== Naming ==
This minor planet was named after Carl Wilhelm Ludwig Martin Ebell (1871–1944) an astronomer from Neuruppin, Germany, who was on the editorial team of the renowned astronomical journal Astronomische Nachrichten. The official naming citation was published by Paul Herget in The Names of the Minor Planets in 1955 (H 112).
