= 1230 Riceia =

Main-belt asteroid

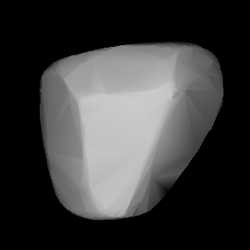
- Shape model of Riceia from its lightcurve

Discovery
- Discovered by: K. Reinmuth
- Discovery site: Heidelberg Obs.
- Discovery date: 9 October 1931

Designations
- Pronunciation: /ˈraɪsiə/
- Named after: Hugh Rice (U.S. amateur astronomer)
- Alternative designations: 1931 TX_{1} · 1964 TS; 1964 UE · 1975 HH
- Minor planet category: main-belt · (inner) background

Orbital characteristics
- Epoch 4 September 2017 (JD 2458000.5)
- Uncertainty parameter 0
- Observation arc: 86.13 yr (31,459 days)
- Aphelion: 3.0335 AU
- Perihelion: 2.1104 AU
- Semi-major axis: 2.5719 AU
- Eccentricity: 0.1795
- Orbital period (sidereal): 4.12 yr (1,507 days)
- Mean anomaly: 288.81°
- Mean motion: 0° 14^{m} 20.4^{s} / day
- Inclination: 10.515°
- Longitude of ascending node: 200.55°
- Argument of perihelion: 185.25°

Physical characteristics
- Dimensions: 6.194±0.344 km 7.46 km (calculated)
- Synodic rotation period: 6.67317±0.00001 h
- Geometric albedo: 0.20 (assumed); 0.318±0.037
- Spectral type: S
- Absolute magnitude (H): 12.90 · 13.0 · 13.11±0.22

1230 Riceia, provisional designation 1931 TX_{1}, is a stony background asteroid from the central regions of the asteroid belt, approximately 6 kilometers in diameter. It was discovered on 9 October 1931, by German astronomer Karl Reinmuth at the Heidelberg-Königstuhl State Observatory. The asteroid was named after Hugh Rice, amateur astronomer of New York and director of the Museum of Natural Sciences.

== Orbit and classification ==
Riceia is a non-family asteroid from the main belt's background population. It orbits the Sun in the central asteroid belt at a distance of 2.1–3.0 AU once every 4 years and 1 month (1,507 days; semi-major axis of 2.57 AU). Its orbit has an eccentricity of 0.18 and an inclination of 11° with respect to the ecliptic.

The body's observation arc begins at Heidelberg on 17 October 1931, or eight days after its official discovery observation.

== Physical characteristics ==
Riceia has been characterized as a stony S-type asteroid by Pan-STARRS photometric survey.

=== Rotation period and pole ===
In 2016, a rotational lightcurve of Riceia was modeled from photometric data from the Lowell Photometric Database. Lightcurve analysis gave a sidereal rotation period of 6.67317 hours as well as a spin axis of (37.0°, −63.0°) in ecliptic coordinates (λ, β).

=== Diameter and albedo ===
According to the survey carried out by the NEOWISE mission of NASA's Wide-field Infrared Survey Explorer, Riceia measures 6.19 kilometers in diameter and its surface has a high albedo of 0.318. The Collaborative Asteroid Lightcurve Link assumes a standard albedo for stony asteroids of 0.20 and calculates a diameter of 7.46 kilometers based on an absolute magnitude of 13.0.

== Naming ==
This minor planet was named after American amateur astronomer Hugh Rice, director of the Museum of Natural Sciences (possibly AMNH). The naming was proposed by Irving Meyer and endorsed by German astronomer Gustav Stracke who mentioned on a postcard in February 1937, that his American college, Meyer, who himself did not discover any asteroids, requested the naming after the city of Rutherford, where a private observatory was located at the time.

The official naming citation was mentioned in The Names of the Minor Planets by Paul Herget in 1955 (H 113).
