= 1064 Aethusa =

Main-belt asteroid

Discovery
- Discovered by: K. Reinmuth
- Discovery site: Heidelberg Obs.
- Discovery date: 2 August 1926

Designations
- Pronunciation: /iːˈθjuːsə/
- Named after: Aethusa cynapium (fool's parsley)
- Alternative designations: 1926 PA · 1962 HF
- Minor planet category: main-belt · (middle)

Orbital characteristics
- Epoch 4 September 2017 (JD 2458000.5)
- Uncertainty parameter 0
- Observation arc: 90.66 yr (33,112 days)
- Aphelion: 2.9930 AU
- Perihelion: 2.0917 AU
- Semi-major axis: 2.5424 AU
- Eccentricity: 0.1773
- Orbital period (sidereal): 4.05 yr (1,481 days)
- Mean anomaly: 165.59°
- Mean motion: 0° 14^{m} 35.16^{s} / day
- Inclination: 9.5020°
- Longitude of ascending node: 280.57°
- Argument of perihelion: 20.515°

Physical characteristics
- Dimensions: 17.42±3.60 km 18.56 km (derived); 18.66±0.9 km 19.77±0.36 km 20.007±0.173 km 22.377±0.131 km 25.361±4.376 km
- Synodic rotation period: 8.621±0.004 h (Note: Lightcurve plot of 1064 Aethusa, Palmer Divide Observatory, Brian D. Warner (2006)); 12.916±0.002 h
- Geometric albedo: 0.160±0.087; 0.2282±0.0133; 0.27±0.12; 0.278±0.046; 0.288±0.012; 0.2952 (derived); 0.3202±0.034
- Spectral type: S
- Absolute magnitude (H): 10.50 · 10.6 · 10.75±0.20 · 10.88

1064 Aethusa, provisional designation 1926 PA, is a stony background asteroid from the central regions of the asteroid belt, approximately 19 kilometers in diameter. It was discovered on 2 August 1926, by astronomer Karl Reinmuth at the Heidelberg-Königstuhl State Observatory in southwest Germany. The asteroid was named after the plant Aethusa cynapium (fool's parsley).

== Orbit and classification ==
Aethusa is a background asteroid with no associated asteroid family. It orbits the Sun in the central main belt at a distance of 2.1–3.0 AU once every 4 years and 1 month (1,481 days). Its orbit has an eccentricity of 0.18 and an inclination of 10° with respect to the ecliptic. The observation arc begins at Heidelberg/Simeiz Observatory two nights after the asteroid's official discovery observation.

== Physical characteristics ==
Aethusa is an assumed stony S-type asteroid, the most common type in the inner part of the central asteroid belt.

=== Rotation period ===
In November 2004, a rotational lightcurve of Aethusa was obtained from photometric observations by French amateur astronomer René Roy at Blauvac Observatory (627). Lightcurve analysis gave a rotation period of 12.916 hours with a brightness variation of 0.12 magnitude (U=2), while in March 2006, astronomer Brian Warner at his Palmer Divide observatory in Colorado, United States, obtained a shorter period of 8.621 hours and an amplitude of 0.18 magnitude (U=2).

=== Diameter and albedo ===
According to the surveys carried out by the Infrared Astronomical Satellite IRAS, the Japanese Akari satellite, the MIPS photometer on the Spitzer Space Telescope, and the NEOWISE mission of NASA's Wide-field Infrared Survey Explorer, Aethusa measures between 17.42 and 25.361 kilometers in diameter and its surface has an albedo between 0.160 and 0.3202.

The Collaborative Asteroid Lightcurve Link derives a high albedo of 0.2952 and a diameter of 18.56 kilometers based on an absolute magnitude of 10.6.

== Naming ==
This minor planet was named after the genus "Aethusa" in the carrot family, of which the plant Aethusa cynapium – commonly known as fool's parsley, fool's cicely, or poison parsley – is the only member. The official naming citation was mentioned in The Names of the Minor Planets by Paul Herget in 1955 (H 101).

== See also ==
- List of minor planets named after animals and plants § Plants
