= List of named minor planets: 1000–1999 =

This is a partial list of named minor planets in numerical order. It contains a total of 1,000 entries as of 20 March 2026. Minor planets for which no article exist are displayed in grey color and redirect to the list of minor planets (see List of minor planets § Main index).

== From 1,000 to 1,999 ==
- 1000 Piazzia
- 1001 Gaussia
- 1002 Olbersia
- 1003 Lilofee
- 1004 Belopolskya
- 1005 Arago
- 1006 Lagrangea
- 1007 Pawlowia
- 1008 La Paz
- 1009 Sirene
- 1010 Marlene
- 1011 Laodamia
- 1012 Sarema
- 1013 Tombecka
- 1014 Semphyra
- 1015 Christa
- 1016 Anitra
- 1017 Jacqueline
- 1018 Arnolda
- 1019 Strackea
- 1020 Arcadia
- 1021 Flammario
- 1022 Olympiada
- 1023 Thomana
- 1024 Hale
- 1025 Riema
- 1026 Ingrid
- 1027 Aesculapia
- 1028 Lydina
- 1029 La Plata
- 1030 Vitja
- 1031 Arctica
- 1032 Pafuri
- 1033 Simona
- 1034 Mozartia
- 1035 Amata
- 1036 Ganymed
- 1037 Davidweilla
- 1038 Tuckia
- 1039 Sonneberga
- 1040 Klumpkea
- 1041 Asta
- 1042 Amazone
- 1043 Beate
- 1044 Teutonia
- 1045 Michela
- 1046 Edwin
- 1047 Geisha
- 1048 Feodosia
- 1049 Gotho
- 1050 Meta
- 1051 Merope
- 1052 Belgica
- 1053 Vigdis
- 1054 Forsytia
- 1055 Tynka
- 1056 Azalea
- 1057 Wanda
- 1058 Grubba
- 1059 Mussorgskia
- 1060 Magnolia
- 1061 Paeonia
- 1062 Ljuba
- 1063 Aquilegia
- 1064 Aethusa
- 1065 Amundsenia
- 1066 Lobelia
- 1067 Lunaria
- 1068 Nofretete
- 1069 Planckia
- 1070 Tunica
- 1071 Brita
- 1072 Malva
- 1073 Gellivara
- 1074 Beljawskya
- 1075 Helina
- 1076 Viola
- 1077 Campanula
- 1078 Mentha
- 1079 Mimosa
- 1080 Orchis
- 1081 Reseda
- 1082 Pirola
- 1083 Salvia
- 1084 Tamariwa
- 1085 Amaryllis
- 1086 Nata
- 1087 Arabis
- 1088 Mitaka
- 1089 Tama
- 1090 Sumida
- 1091 Spiraea
- 1092 Lilium
- 1093 Freda
- 1094 Siberia
- 1095 Tulipa
- 1096 Reunerta
- 1097 Vicia
- 1098 Hakone
- 1099 Figneria
- 1100 Arnica
- 1101 Clematis
- 1102 Pepita
- 1103 Sequoia
- 1104 Syringa
- 1105 Fragaria
- 1106 Cydonia
- 1107 Lictoria
- 1108 Demeter
- 1109 Tata
- 1110 Jaroslawa
- 1111 Reinmuthia
- 1112 Polonia
- 1113 Katja
- 1114 Lorraine
- 1115 Sabauda
- 1116 Catriona
- 1117 Reginita
- 1118 Hanskya
- 1119 Euboea
- 1120 Cannonia
- 1121 Natascha
- 1122 Neith
- 1123 Shapleya
- 1124 Stroobantia
- 1125 China
- 1126 Otero
- 1127 Mimi
- 1128 Astrid
- 1129 Neujmina
- 1130 Skuld
- 1131 Porzia
- 1132 Hollandia
- 1133 Lugduna
- 1134 Kepler
- 1135 Colchis
- 1136 Mercedes
- 1137 Raïssa
- 1138 Attica
- 1139 Atami
- 1140 Crimea
- 1141 Bohmia
- 1142 Aetolia
- 1143 Odysseus
- 1144 Oda
- 1145 Robelmonte
- 1146 Biarmia
- 1147 Stavropolis
- 1148 Rarahu
- 1149 Volga
- 1150 Achaia
- 1151 Ithaka
- 1152 Pawona
- 1153 Wallenbergia
- 1154 Astronomia
- 1155 Aënna
- 1156 Kira
- 1157 Arabia
- 1158 Luda
- 1159 Granada
- 1160 Illyria
- 1161 Thessalia
- 1162 Larissa
- 1163 Saga
- 1164 Kobolda
- 1165 Imprinetta
- 1166 Sakuntala
- 1167 Dubiago
- 1168 Brandia
- 1169 Alwine
- 1170 Siva
- 1171 Rusthawelia
- 1172 Äneas
- 1173 Anchises
- 1174 Marmara
- 1175 Margo
- 1176 Lucidor
- 1177 Gonnessia
- 1178 Irmela
- 1179 Mally
- 1180 Rita
- 1181 Lilith
- 1182 Ilona
- 1183 Jutta
- 1184 Gaea
- 1185 Nikko
- 1186 Turnera
- 1187 Afra
- 1188 Gothlandia
- 1189 Terentia
- 1190 Pelagia
- 1191 Alfaterna
- 1192 Prisma
- 1193 Africa
- 1194 Aletta
- 1195 Orangia
- 1196 Sheba
- 1197 Rhodesia
- 1198 Atlantis
- 1199 Geldonia
- 1200 Imperatrix
- 1201 Strenua
- 1202 Marina
- 1203 Nanna
- 1204 Renzia
- 1205 Ebella
- 1206 Numerowia
- 1207 Ostenia
- 1208 Troilus
- 1209 Pumma
- 1210 Morosovia
- 1211 Bressole
- 1212 Francette
- 1213 Algeria
- 1214 Richilde
- 1215 Boyer
- 1216 Askania
- 1217 Maximiliana
- 1218 Aster
- 1219 Britta
- 1220 Crocus
- 1221 Amor
- 1222 Tina
- 1223 Neckar
- 1224 Fantasia
- 1225 Ariane
- 1226 Golia
- 1227 Geranium
- 1228 Scabiosa
- 1229 Tilia
- 1230 Riceia
- 1231 Auricula
- 1232 Cortusa
- 1233 Kobresia
- 1234 Elyna
- 1235 Schorria
- 1236 Thaïs
- 1237 Geneviève
- 1238 Predappia
- 1239 Queteleta
- 1240 Centenaria
- 1241 Dysona
- 1242 Zambesia
- 1243 Pamela
- 1244 Deira
- 1245 Calvinia
- 1246 Chaka
- 1247 Memoria
- 1248 Jugurtha
- 1249 Rutherfordia
- 1250 Galanthus
- 1251 Hedera
- 1252 Celestia
- 1253 Frisia
- 1254 Erfordia
- 1255 Schilowa
- 1256 Normannia
- 1257 Móra
- 1258 Sicilia
- 1259 Ógyalla
- 1260 Walhalla
- 1261 Legia
- 1262 Sniadeckia
- 1263 Varsavia
- 1264 Letaba
- 1265 Schweikarda
- 1266 Tone
- 1267 Geertruida
- 1268 Libya
- 1269 Rollandia
- 1270 Datura
- 1271 Isergina
- 1272 Gefion
- 1273 Helma
- 1274 Delportia
- 1275 Cimbria
- 1276 Ucclia
- 1277 Dolores
- 1278 Kenya
- 1279 Uganda
- 1280 Baillauda
- 1281 Jeanne
- 1282 Utopia
- 1283 Komsomolia
- 1284 Latvia
- 1285 Julietta
- 1286 Banachiewicza
- 1287 Lorcia
- 1288 Santa
- 1289 Kutaïssi
- 1290 Albertine
- 1291 Phryne
- 1292 Luce
- 1293 Sonja
- 1294 Antwerpia
- 1295 Deflotte
- 1296 Andrée
- 1297 Quadea
- 1298 Nocturna
- 1299 Mertona
- 1300 Marcelle
- 1301 Yvonne
- 1302 Werra
- 1303 Luthera
- 1304 Arosa
- 1305 Pongola
- 1306 Scythia
- 1307 Cimmeria
- 1308 Halleria
- 1309 Hyperborea
- 1310 Villigera
- 1311 Knopfia
- 1312 Vassar
- 1313 Berna
- 1314 Paula
- 1315 Bronislawa
- 1316 Kasan
- 1317 Silvretta
- 1318 Nerina
- 1319 Disa
- 1320 Impala
- 1321 Majuba
- 1322 Coppernicus
- 1323 Tugela
- 1324 Knysna
- 1325 Inanda
- 1326 Losaka
- 1327 Namaqua
- 1328 Devota
- 1329 Eliane
- 1330 Spiridonia
- 1331 Solvejg
- 1332 Marconia
- 1333 Cevenola
- 1334 Lundmarka
- 1335 Demoulina
- 1336 Zeelandia
- 1337 Gerarda
- 1338 Duponta
- 1339 Désagneauxa
- 1340 Yvette
- 1341 Edmée
- 1342 Brabantia
- 1343 Nicole
- 1344 Caubeta
- 1345 Potomac
- 1346 Gotha
- 1347 Patria
- 1348 Michel
- 1349 Bechuana
- 1350 Rosselia
- 1351 Uzbekistania
- 1352 Wawel
- 1353 Maartje
- 1354 Botha
- 1355 Magoeba
- 1356 Nyanza
- 1357 Khama
- 1358 Gaika
- 1359 Prieska
- 1360 Tarka
- 1361 Leuschneria
- 1362 Griqua
- 1363 Herberta
- 1364 Safara
- 1365 Henyey
- 1366 Piccolo
- 1367 Nongoma
- 1368 Numidia
- 1369 Ostanina
- 1370 Hella
- 1371 Resi
- 1372 Haremari
- 1373 Cincinnati
- 1374 Isora
- 1375 Alfreda
- 1376 Michelle
- 1377 Roberbauxa
- 1378 Leonce
- 1379 Lomonosowa
- 1380 Volodia
- 1381 Danubia
- 1382 Gerti
- 1383 Limburgia
- 1384 Kniertje
- 1385 Gelria
- 1386 Storeria
- 1387 Kama
- 1388 Aphrodite
- 1389 Onnie
- 1390 Abastumani
- 1391 Carelia
- 1392 Pierre
- 1393 Sofala
- 1394 Algoa
- 1395 Aribeda
- 1396 Outeniqua
- 1397 Umtata
- 1398 Donnera
- 1399 Teneriffa
- 1400 Tirela
- 1401 Lavonne
- 1402 Eri
- 1403 Idelsonia
- 1404 Ajax
- 1405 Sibelius
- 1406 Komppa
- 1407 Lindelöf
- 1408 Trusanda
- 1409 Isko
- 1410 Margret
- 1411 Brauna
- 1412 Lagrula
- 1413 Roucarie
- 1414 Jérôme
- 1415 Malautra
- 1416 Renauxa
- 1417 Walinskia
- 1418 Fayeta
- 1419 Danzig
- 1420 Radcliffe
- 1421 Esperanto
- 1422 Strömgrenia
- 1423 Jose
- 1424 Sundmania
- 1425 Tuorla
- 1426 Riviera
- 1427 Ruvuma
- 1428 Mombasa
- 1429 Pemba
- 1430 Somalia
- 1431 Luanda
- 1432 Ethiopia
- 1433 Geramtina
- 1434 Margot
- 1435 Garlena
- 1436 Salonta
- 1437 Diomedes
- 1438 Wendeline
- 1439 Vogtia
- 1440 Rostia
- 1441 Bolyai
- 1442 Corvina
- 1443 Ruppina
- 1444 Pannonia
- 1445 Konkolya
- 1446 Sillanpää
- 1447 Utra
- 1448 Lindbladia
- 1449 Virtanen
- 1450 Raimonda
- 1451 Granö
- 1452 Hunnia
- 1453 Fennia
- 1454 Kalevala
- 1455 Mitchella
- 1456 Saldanha
- 1457 Ankara
- 1458 Mineura
- 1459 Magnya
- 1460 Haltia
- 1461 Jean-Jacques
- 1462 Zamenhof
- 1463 Nordenmarkia
- 1464 Armisticia
- 1465 Autonoma
- 1466 Mündleria
- 1467 Mashona
- 1468 Zomba
- 1469 Linzia
- 1470 Carla
- 1471 Tornio
- 1472 Muonio
- 1473 Ounas
- 1474 Beira
- 1475 Yalta
- 1476 Cox
- 1477 Bonsdorffia
- 1478 Vihuri
- 1479 Inkeri
- 1480 Aunus
- 1481 Tübingia
- 1482 Sebastiana
- 1483 Hakoila
- 1484 Postrema
- 1485 Isa
- 1486 Marilyn
- 1487 Boda
- 1488 Aura
- 1489 Attila
- 1490 Limpopo
- 1491 Balduinus
- 1492 Oppolzer
- 1493 Sigrid
- 1494 Savo
- 1495 Helsinki
- 1496 Turku
- 1497 Tampere
- 1498 Lahti
- 1499 Pori
- 1500 Jyväskylä
- 1501 Baade
- 1502 Arenda
- 1503 Kuopio
- 1504 Lappeenranta
- 1505 Koranna
- 1506 Xosa
- 1507 Vaasa
- 1508 Kemi
- 1509 Esclangona
- 1510 Charlois
- 1511 Daléra
- 1512 Oulu
- 1513 Mátra
- 1514 Ricouxa
- 1515 Perrotin
- 1516 Henry
- 1517 Beograd
- 1518 Rovaniemi
- 1519 Kajaani
- 1520 Imatra
- 1521 Seinäjoki
- 1522 Kokkola
- 1523 Pieksämäki
- 1524 Joensuu
- 1525 Savonlinna
- 1526 Mikkeli
- 1527 Malmquista
- 1528 Conrada
- 1529 Oterma
- 1530 Rantaseppä
- 1531 Hartmut
- 1532 Inari
- 1533 Saimaa
- 1534 Näsi
- 1535 Päijänne
- 1536 Pielinen
- 1537 Transylvania
- 1538 Detre
- 1539 Borrelly
- 1540 Kevola
- 1541 Estonia
- 1542 Schalén
- 1543 Bourgeois
- 1544 Vinterhansenia
- 1545 Thernöe
- 1546 Izsák
- 1547 Nele
- 1548 Palomaa
- 1549 Mikko
- 1550 Tito
- 1551 Argelander
- 1552 Bessel
- 1553 Bauersfelda
- 1554 Yugoslavia
- 1555 Dejan
- 1556 Wingolfia
- 1557 Roehla
- 1558 Järnefelt
- 1559 Kustaanheimo
- 1560 Strattonia
- 1561 Fricke
- 1562 Gondolatsch
- 1563 Noël
- 1564 Srbija
- 1565 Lemaître
- 1566 Icarus
- 1567 Alikoski
- 1568 Aisleen
- 1569 Evita
- 1570 Brunonia
- 1571 Cesco
- 1572 Posnania
- 1573 Väisälä
- 1574 Meyer
- 1575 Winifred
- 1576 Fabiola
- 1577 Reiss
- 1578 Kirkwood
- 1579 Herrick
- 1580 Betulia
- 1581 Abanderada
- 1582 Martir
- 1583 Antilochus
- 1584 Fuji
- 1585 Union
- 1586 Thiele
- 1587 Kahrstedt
- 1588 Descamisada
- 1589 Fanatica
- 1590 Tsiolkovskaja
- 1591 Baize
- 1592 Mathieu
- 1593 Fagnes
- 1594 Danjon
- 1595 Tanga
- 1596 Itzigsohn
- 1597 Laugier
- 1598 Paloque
- 1599 Giomus
- 1600 Vyssotsky
- 1601 Patry
- 1602 Indiana
- 1603 Neva
- 1604 Tombaugh
- 1605 Milankovitch
- 1606 Jekhovsky
- 1607 Mavis
- 1608 Muñoz
- 1609 Brenda
- 1610 Mirnaya
- 1611 Beyer
- 1612 Hirose
- 1613 Smiley
- 1614 Goldschmidt
- 1615 Bardwell
- 1616 Filipoff
- 1617 Alschmitt
- 1618 Dawn
- 1619 Ueta
- 1620 Geographos
- 1621 Druzhba
- 1622 Chacornac
- 1623 Vivian
- 1624 Rabe
- 1625 The NORC
- 1626 Sadeya
- 1627 Ivar
- 1628 Strobel
- 1629 Pecker
- 1630 Milet
- 1631 Kopff
- 1632 Sieböhme
- 1633 Chimay
- 1634 Ndola
- 1635 Bohrmann
- 1636 Porter
- 1637 Swings
- 1638 Ruanda
- 1639 Bower
- 1640 Nemo
- 1641 Tana
- 1642 Hill
- 1643 Brown
- 1644 Rafita
- 1645 Waterfield
- 1646 Rosseland
- 1647 Menelaus
- 1648 Shajna
- 1649 Fabre
- 1650 Heckmann
- 1651 Behrens
- 1652 Hergé
- 1653 Yakhontovia
- 1654 Bojeva
- 1655 Comas Solà
- 1656 Suomi
- 1657 Roemera
- 1658 Innes
- 1659 Punkaharju
- 1660 Wood
- 1661 Granule
- 1662 Hoffmann
- 1663 van den Bos
- 1664 Felix
- 1665 Gaby
- 1666 van Gent
- 1667 Pels
- 1668 Hanna
- 1669 Dagmar
- 1670 Minnaert
- 1671 Chaika
- 1672 Gezelle
- 1673 van Houten
- 1674 Groeneveld
- 1675 Simonida
- 1676 Kariba
- 1677 Tycho Brahe
- 1678 Hveen
- 1679 Nevanlinna
- 1680 Per Brahe
- 1681 Steinmetz
- 1682 Karel
- 1683 Castafiore
- 1684 Iguassú
- 1685 Toro
- 1686 De Sitter
- 1687 Glarona
- 1688 Wilkens
- 1689 Floris-Jan
- 1690 Mayrhofer
- 1691 Oort
- 1692 Subbotina
- 1693 Hertzsprung
- 1694 Kaiser
- 1695 Walbeck
- 1696 Nurmela
- 1697 Koskenniemi
- 1698 Christophe
- 1699 Honkasalo
- 1700 Zvezdara
- 1701 Okavango
- 1702 Kalahari
- 1703 Barry
- 1704 Wachmann
- 1705 Tapio
- 1706 Dieckvoss
- 1707 Chantal
- 1708 Pólit
- 1709 Ukraina
- 1710 Gothard
- 1711 Sandrine
- 1712 Angola
- 1713 Bancilhon
- 1714 Sy
- 1715 Salli
- 1716 Peter
- 1717 Arlon
- 1718 Namibia
- 1719 Jens
- 1720 Niels
- 1721 Wells
- 1722 Goffin
- 1723 Klemola
- 1724 Vladimir
- 1725 CrAO
- 1726 Hoffmeister
- 1727 Mette
- 1728 Goethe Link
- 1729 Beryl
- 1730 Marceline
- 1731 Smuts
- 1732 Heike
- 1733 Silke
- 1734 Zhongolovich
- 1735 ITA
- 1736 Floirac
- 1737 Severny
- 1738 Oosterhoff
- 1739 Meyermann
- 1740 Paavo Nurmi
- 1741 Giclas
- 1742 Schaifers
- 1743 Schmidt
- 1744 Harriet
- 1745 Ferguson
- 1746 Brouwer
- 1747 Wright
- 1748 Mauderli
- 1749 Telamon
- 1750 Eckert
- 1751 Herget
- 1752 van Herk
- 1753 Mieke
- 1754 Cunningham
- 1755 Lorbach
- 1756 Giacobini
- 1757 Porvoo
- 1758 Naantali
- 1759 Kienle
- 1760 Sandra
- 1761 Edmondson
- 1762 Russell
- 1763 Williams
- 1764 Cogshall
- 1765 Wrubel
- 1766 Slipher
- 1767 Lampland
- 1768 Appenzella
- 1769 Carlostorres
- 1770 Schlesinger
- 1771 Makover
- 1772 Gagarin
- 1773 Rumpelstilz
- 1774 Kulikov
- 1775 Zimmerwald
- 1776 Kuiper
- 1777 Gehrels
- 1778 Alfvén
- 1779 Paraná
- 1780 Kippes
- 1781 Van Biesbroeck
- 1782 Schneller
- 1783 Albitskij
- 1784 Benguella
- 1785 Wurm
- 1786 Raahe
- 1787 Chiny
- 1788 Kiess
- 1789 Dobrovolsky
- 1790 Volkov
- 1791 Patsayev
- 1792 Reni
- 1793 Zoya
- 1794 Finsen
- 1795 Woltjer
- 1796 Riga
- 1797 Schaumasse
- 1798 Watts
- 1799 Koussevitzky
- 1800 Aguilar
- 1801 Titicaca
- 1802 Zhang Heng
- 1803 Zwicky
- 1804 Chebotarev
- 1805 Dirikis
- 1806 Derice
- 1807 Slovakia
- 1808 Bellerophon
- 1809 Prometheus
- 1810 Epimetheus
- 1811 Bruwer
- 1812 Gilgamesh
- 1813 Imhotep
- 1814 Bach
- 1815 Beethoven
- 1816 Liberia
- 1817 Katanga
- 1818 Brahms
- 1819 Laputa
- 1820 Lohmann
- 1821 Aconcagua
- 1822 Waterman
- 1823 Gliese
- 1824 Haworth
- 1825 Klare
- 1826 Miller
- 1827 Atkinson
- 1828 Kashirina
- 1829 Dawson
- 1830 Pogson
- 1831 Nicholson
- 1832 Mrkos
- 1833 Shmakova
- 1834 Palach
- 1835 Gajdariya
- 1836 Komarov
- 1837 Osita
- 1838 Ursa
- 1839 Ragazza
- 1840 Hus
- 1841 Masaryk
- 1842 Hynek
- 1843 Jarmila
- 1844 Susilva
- 1845 Helewalda
- 1846 Bengt
- 1847 Stobbe
- 1848 Delvaux
- 1849 Kresák
- 1850 Kohoutek
- 1851 Lacroute
- 1852 Carpenter
- 1853 McElroy
- 1854 Skvortsov
- 1855 Korolev
- 1856 Růžena
- 1857 Parchomenko
- 1858 Lobachevskij
- 1859 Kovalevskaya
- 1860 Barbarossa
- 1861 Komenský
- 1862 Apollo
- 1863 Antinous
- 1864 Daedalus
- 1865 Cerberus
- 1866 Sisyphus
- 1867 Deiphobus
- 1868 Thersites
- 1869 Philoctetes
- 1870 Glaukos
- 1871 Astyanax
- 1872 Helenos
- 1873 Agenor
- 1874 Kacivelia
- 1875 Neruda
- 1876 Napolitania
- 1877 Marsden
- 1878 Hughes
- 1879 Broederstroom
- 1880 McCrosky
- 1881 Shao
- 1882 Rauma
- 1883 Rimito
- 1884 Skip
- 1885 Herero
- 1886 Lowell
- 1887 Virton
- 1888 Zu Chong-Zhi
- 1889 Pakhmutova
- 1890 Konoshenkova
- 1891 Gondola
- 1892 Lucienne
- 1893 Jakoba
- 1894 Haffner
- 1895 Larink
- 1896 Beer
- 1897 Hind
- 1898 Cowell
- 1899 Crommelin
- 1900 Katyusha
- 1901 Moravia
- 1902 Shaposhnikov
- 1903 Adzhimushkaj
- 1904 Massevitch
- 1905 Ambartsumian
- 1906 Naef
- 1907 Rudneva
- 1908 Pobeda
- 1909 Alekhin
- 1910 Mikhailov
- 1911 Schubart
- 1912 Anubis
- 1913 Sekanina
- 1914 Hartbeespoortdam
- 1915 Quetzálcoatl
- 1916 Boreas
- 1917 Cuyo
- 1918 Aiguillon
- 1919 Clemence
- 1920 Sarmiento
- 1921 Pala
- 1922 Zulu
- 1923 Osiris
- 1924 Horus
- 1925 Franklin-Adams
- 1926 Demiddelaer
- 1927 Suvanto
- 1928 Summa
- 1929 Kollaa
- 1930 Lucifer
- 1931 Čapek
- 1932 Jansky
- 1933 Tinchen
- 1934 Jeffers
- 1935 Lucerna
- 1936 Lugano
- 1937 Locarno
- 1938 Lausanna
- 1939 Loretta
- 1940 Whipple
- 1941 Wild
- 1942 Jablunka
- 1943 Anteros
- 1944 Günter
- 1945 Wesselink
- 1946 Walraven
- 1947 Iso-Heikkilä
- 1948 Kampala
- 1949 Messina
- 1950 Wempe
- 1951 Lick
- 1952 Hesburgh
- 1953 Rupertwildt
- 1954 Kukarkin
- 1955 McMath
- 1956 Artek
- 1957 Angara
- 1958 Chandra
- 1959 Karbyshev
- 1960 Guisan
- 1961 Dufour
- 1962 Dunant
- 1963 Bezovec
- 1964 Luyten
- 1965 van de Kamp
- 1966 Tristan
- 1967 Menzel
- 1968 Mehltretter
- 1969 Alain
- 1970 Sumeria
- 1971 Hagihara
- 1972 Yi Xing
- 1973 Colocolo
- 1974 Caupolican
- 1975 Pikelner
- 1976 Kaverin
- 1977 Shura
- 1978 Patrice
- 1979 Sakharov
- 1980 Tezcatlipoca
- 1981 Midas
- 1982 Cline
- 1983 Bok
- 1984 Fedynskij
- 1985 Hopmann
- 1986 Plaut
- 1987 Kaplan
- 1988 Delores
- 1989 Tatry
- 1990 Pilcher
- 1991 Darwin
- 1992 Galvarino
- 1993 Guacolda
- 1994 Shane
- 1995 Hajek
- 1996 Adams
- 1997 Leverrier
- 1998 Titius
- 1999 Hirayama
back to top

== See also ==
- List of minor planet discoverers
- List of observatory codes
- Meanings of minor planet names § Index
