= 1382 Gerti =

Asteroid

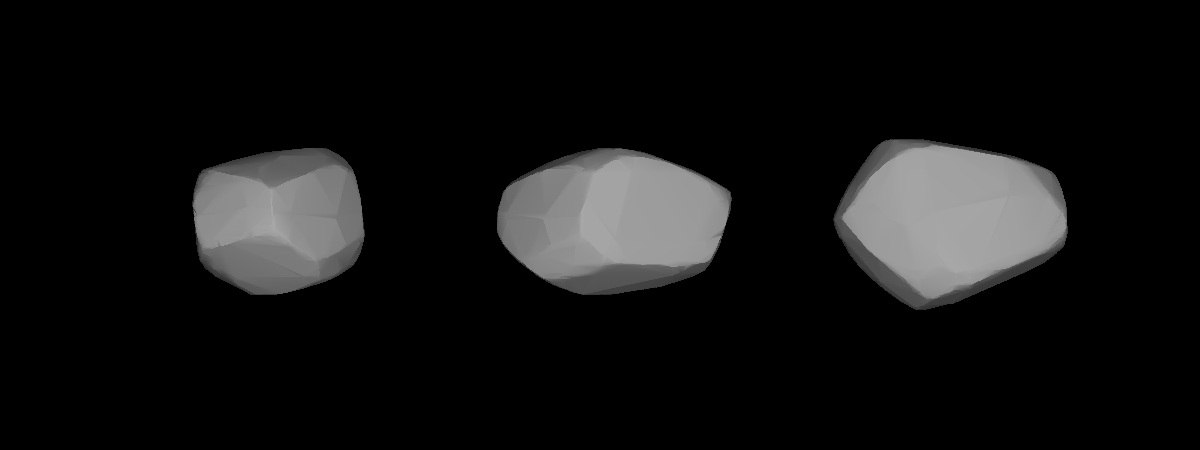
- Lightcurve-based 3D-model of Gerti

Discovery
- Discovered by: K. Reinmuth
- Discovery site: Heidelberg Obs.
- Discovery date: 21 January 1925

Designations
- Named after: Gertrud Höhne (ARI secretary)
- Alternative designations: 1925 BB · 1929 LH; 1933 UL_{1} · 1936 QB_{1}
- Minor planet category: main-belt · (inner); Flora · background

Orbital characteristics
- Epoch 4 September 2017 (JD 2458000.5)
- Uncertainty parameter 0
- Observation arc: 92.18 yr (33,670 days)
- Aphelion: 2.5119 AU
- Perihelion: 1.9274 AU
- Semi-major axis: 2.2196 AU
- Eccentricity: 0.1317
- Orbital period (sidereal): 3.31 yr (1,208 days)
- Mean anomaly: 258.61°
- Mean motion: 0° 17^{m} 52.8^{s} / day
- Inclination: 1.5621°
- Longitude of ascending node: 353.04°
- Argument of perihelion: 246.96°

Physical characteristics
- Dimensions: 8.54 km (derived); 9.14±0.95 km 9.75±1.68 km 11.94±0.19 km
- Synodic rotation period: 3.0±0.2 h 3.081545±0.000005 h 3.082±0.0004 h 3.082±0.002 h
- Geometric albedo: 0.196±0.024; 0.24 (assumed); 0.278±0.059; 0.28±0.08
- Spectral type: S (assumed)
- Absolute magnitude (H): 11.765±0.000 (R) · 12.00 · 12.04±0.28 · 12.20 · 12.27 · 12.51 · 12.51±0.01

1382 Gerti, provisional designation 1925 BB, is a Florian asteroid from the inner regions of the asteroid belt, approximately 10 kilometers in diameter. It was discovered on 21 January 1925, by astronomer Karl Reinmuth at the Heidelberg-Königstuhl State Observatory in southwest Germany. The asteroid was named after a secretary of the Astronomical Calculation Institute, Gertrud Höhne.

== Orbit and classification ==
Gerti has been dynamically classified as a member of the Flora family (402), a giant asteroid family and the largest family of stony asteroids in the main-belt. It is, however, a non-family asteroid of the main belt's background population when applying the Hierarchical Clustering Method to its proper orbital elements (both by Nesvorný as well as by Novakovic, Knežević and Milani).

It orbits the Sun in the inner main-belt at a distance of 1.9–2.5 AU once every 3 years and 4 months (1,208 days). Its orbit has an eccentricity of 0.13 and an inclination of 2° with respect to the ecliptic. The body's observation arc begins with its official discovery observation at Heidelberg in January 1925.

== Physical characteristics ==
The LCDB assumes it to be a stony S-type asteroid, due to its dynamical classification as a member of the Flora family (402).

=== Rotation period ===
Two rotational lightcurve of Gerti were obtained from photometric observations by Wiesław Wiśniewski in February 1988, and by astronomers at the Palomar Transient Factory in January 2011, respectively. Lightcurve analysis gave an identical rotation period of 3.082 hours with a respective brightness amplitude of 0.20 and 0.29 magnitude (U=3/2). A third lightcurve by René Roy in March 2008 gave a period of 3.0 hours with an amplitude of 0.36 magnitude (U=2).

=== Poles ===
In 2011, a modeled lightcurve using data from the Uppsala Asteroid Photometric Catalogue and other sources gave a concurring sidereal period of 3.081545 hours, as well as two spin axis of (268.0°, 23.0°) and (87.0°, 28.0°) in ecliptic coordinates (λ, β).

=== Diameter and albedo ===
According to the surveys carried out by the Japanese Akari satellite and the NEOWISE mission of NASA's Wide-field Infrared Survey Explorer, Gerti measures between 9.14 and 11.94 kilometers in diameter and its surface has an albedo between 0.196 and 0.28.

The Collaborative Asteroid Lightcurve Link assumes an albedo of 0.24 – taken from 8 Flora, the Flora family's parent body – and derives a diameter of 8.54 kilometers based on an absolute magnitude of 12.51.

== Naming ==
This minor planet was named after Gertrud Höhne who was a secretary at the Berlin Astronomical Calculation Institute (German: Astronomisches Rechen-Institut. The official naming citation was mentioned in The Names of the Minor Planets by Paul Herget in 1955 (H 125).
