= 1083 Salvia =

Main-belt asteroid

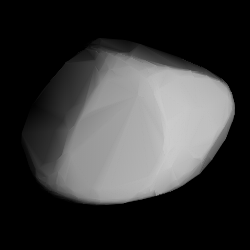
- Shape model of Salvia from its lightcurve

Discovery
- Discovered by: K. Reinmuth
- Discovery site: Heidelberg Obs.
- Discovery date: 26 January 1928

Designations
- Pronunciation: /ˈsælviə/
- Named after: Salvia (flowering plant)
- Alternative designations: 1928 BC · 1948 VO; A910 AA · A916 WF
- Minor planet category: main-belt · (inner); background

Orbital characteristics
- Epoch 4 September 2017 (JD 2458000.5)
- Uncertainty parameter 0
- Observation arc: 107.49 yr (39,261 days)
- Aphelion: 2.7548 AU
- Perihelion: 1.9036 AU
- Semi-major axis: 2.3292 AU
- Eccentricity: 0.1827
- Orbital period (sidereal): 3.55 yr (1,298 days)
- Mean anomaly: 91.450°
- Mean motion: 0° 16^{m} 38.28^{s} / day
- Inclination: 5.1311°
- Longitude of ascending node: 80.812°
- Argument of perihelion: 32.665°

Physical characteristics
- Dimensions: 8.927±0.131 km 10.145±0.028 km 10.28 km (taken); 10.283 km
- Synodic rotation period: 4.23±0.02 h
- Pole ecliptic latitude: (165.0°, −59.0°) (λ_{1}/β_{1}); (358.0°, −58.0°) (λ_{2}/β_{2})
- Geometric albedo: 0.2103; 0.211±0.020; 0.2184±0.0353
- Spectral type: S (assumed)
- Absolute magnitude (H): 12.1 · 12.25 · 12.25±0.11

1083 Salvia (prov. designation: 1928 BC) is a stony background asteroid from the inner regions of the asteroid belt. It was discovered on 26 January 1928, by astronomer Karl Reinmuth at the Heidelberg Observatory in southwest Germany. The assumed S-type asteroid has a rotation period of 4.2 hours and measures approximately 10 kilometers (6.2 miles) in diameter. It was named after the flowering plant Salvia (sage).

== Orbit and classification ==
Located in the region of the Flora family, Salvia is a non-family asteroid of the main belt's background population when applying the hierarchical clustering method to its proper orbital elements. It orbits the Sun in the inner asteroid belt at a distance of 1.9–2.8 AU once every 3 years and 7 months (1,298 days; semi-major axis of 2.33 AU). Its orbit has an eccentricity of 0.18 and an inclination of 5° with respect to the ecliptic. The asteroid was first observed as A910 AA at Heidelberg Observatory on 7 January 1910, where the body's observation arc begins 18 years later, with its official discovery observation on 26 January 1928.

== Naming ==
This minor planet was named after the flowering plant Salvia (sage), a genus of herbs or shrubs that belong to the mint family. The official naming citation was mentioned in The Names of the Minor Planets by Paul Herget in 1955 (H 102).

=== Reinmuth's flowers ===
Due to his many discoveries, Karl Reinmuth submitted a large list of 66 newly named asteroids in the early 1930s. The list covered his discoveries with numbers between (1009) and (1200). This list also contained a sequence of 28 asteroids, starting with 1054 Forsytia, that were all named after plants, in particular flowering plants (also see list of minor planets named after animals and plants).

== Physical characteristics ==
Salvia is an assumed stony S-type asteroid, which corresponds to its observed albedo (see below).

=== Rotation period and poles ===
In March 1992, a rotational lightcurve of Salvia was obtained from photometric observations by Polish astronomer Wiesław Wiśniewski. Lightcurve analysis gave a well-defined rotation period of 4.23 hours with a brightness amplitude of 0.61 magnitude (U=3). A 2016-published lightcurve, using modeled photometric data from the Lowell Photometric Database, gave a concurring period of 4.281429±0.000001 hours, as well as two spin axis of (165.0°, −59.0°) and (358.0°, −58.0°) in ecliptic coordinates (λ, β).

=== Diameter and albedo ===
According to the survey carried out by the NEOWISE mission of NASA's Wide-field Infrared Survey Explorer (WISE), Salvia measures between 8.927 and 10.283 kilometers in diameter and its surface has an albedo between 0.2103 and 0.2184. The Collaborative Asteroid Lightcurve Link adopts Petr Pravec's revised WISE data, that is an albedo of 0.2103 and a diameter of 10.28 kilometers based on an absolute magnitude of 12.25.
