= 1105 Fragaria =

Main-belt asteroid

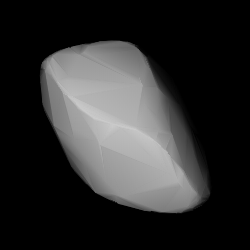
- Shape model of Fragaria from its lightcurve

Discovery
- Discovered by: K. Reinmuth
- Discovery site: Heidelberg Obs.
- Discovery date: 1 January 1929

Designations
- Pronunciation: /frəˈɡɛəriə/
- Named after: Fragaria (flowering plant)
- Alternative designations: 1929 AB · 1947 KB; 1977 EU · A916 MA; A917 UH
- Minor planet category: main-belt · (outer); Eos

Orbital characteristics
- Epoch 23 March 2018 (JD 2458200.5)
- Uncertainty parameter 0
- Observation arc: 89.13 yr (32,553 days)
- Aphelion: 3.3288 AU
- Perihelion: 2.6915 AU
- Semi-major axis: 3.0101 AU
- Eccentricity: 0.1059
- Orbital period (sidereal): 5.22 yr (1,908 days)
- Mean anomaly: 110.60°
- Mean motion: 0° 11^{m} 19.32^{s} / day
- Inclination: 10.968°
- Longitude of ascending node: 116.90°
- Argument of perihelion: 225.01°

Physical characteristics
- Mean diameter: 27.92±3.41 km 31.518±0.346 km 36.95 km (derived); 37.03±3.8 km 38.206±0.703 km 38.41±0.46 km
- Synodic rotation period: 5.4312±0.0008 h
- Geometric albedo: 0.1017±0.0167; 0.1086 (derived); 0.113±0.003; 0.1186±0.029; 0.128±0.008; 0.166±0.058
- Spectral type: Tholen = ST · U/L; B–V = 0.776±029; U–B = 0.419±0.049
- Absolute magnitude (H): 10.09; 10.19; 10.34

1105 Fragaria /frəˈɡɛəriə/ is an Eos asteroid from the outer regions of the asteroid belt. It was discovered on 1 January 1929, by German astronomer Karl Reinmuth at the Heidelberg Observatory in southwest Germany, and assigned the provisional designation 1929 AB. The S-type asteroid (ST/L) has a rotation period of 5.4 hours and measures approximately 37 kilometers (23 miles) in diameter. It was named after the flowering plant Fragaria (strawberry).

== Orbit and classification ==
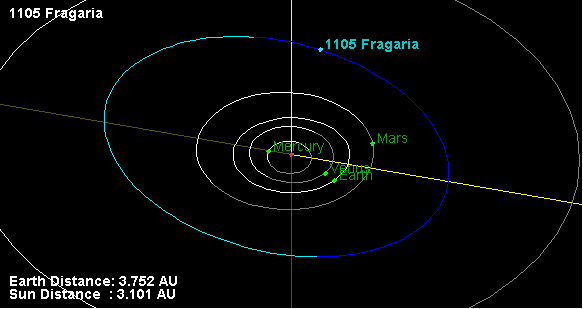
Orbital diagram of Fragaria

Fragaria belongs to the Eos family (606), the largest asteroid family of the outer asteroid belt consisting of nearly 10,000 members. It orbits the Sun in the outer asteroid belt at a distance of 2.7–3.3 AU once every 5 years and 3 months (1,908 days; semi-major axis of 3.01 AU). Its orbit has an eccentricity of 0.11 and an inclination of 11° with respect to the ecliptic.

The asteroid was first observed as 1916 MA at Simeiz Observatory in June 1916. The body's observation arc begins at Heidelberg in December 1928, three weeks prior to its official discovery observation.

== Naming ==
This minor planet was named after Fragaria, the genus of flowering plants in the rose family, commonly known as strawberries. The official naming citation was mentioned in The Names of the Minor Planets by Paul Herget in 1955 (H 104).

=== Reinmuth's flower ===
Karl Reinmuth submitted a list of 66 newly named asteroids in the early 1930s. The list covered his discoveries with numbers between (1009) and (1200). This list also contained a sequence of 28 asteroids, starting with 1054 Forsytia, that were all named after plants, in particular flowering plants (also see list of minor planets named after animals and plants).

== Physical characteristics ==
In the Tholen classification, Fragaria has an ambiguous spectral type, closest to an S-type and somewhat similar to the darker and uncommon T-type asteroids (ST), while polarimetric observations characterized it as an U/L-type asteroid. The overall spectral type for members of the Eos family is that of a K-type.

=== Rotation period ===
In December 2017. a rotational lightcurve of Fragaria was obtained from photometric observations by American photometrist Tom Polakis at the Command Module Observatory (V02) in Arizona. Lightcurve analysis gave a rotation period of 5.4312±0.0008 hours with a brightness variation of 0.33±0.03 magnitude (U=3–). Since the 1990s, the best period determinations was mady by French and Italian astronomers at ESO's La Silla Observatory using the ESO 1-metre telescope which gave 10.88 hours (or twice the period solution) and an amplitude of 0.12 magnitude (U=1). As of 2018, no secure period has been obtained.

=== Diameter and albedo ===
According to the surveys carried out by the Infrared Astronomical Satellite IRAS, the Japanese Akari satellite and the NEOWISE mission of NASA's Wide-field Infrared Survey Explorer, Fragaria measures between 27.92 and 38.41 kilometers in diameter and its surface has an albedo between 0.1017 and 0.166. The Collaborative Asteroid Lightcurve Link derives an albedo of 0.1086 and a diameter of 36.95 kilometers based on an absolute magnitude of 10.19.
