= 1253 Frisia =

Themistian asteroid

Discovery
- Discovered by: K. Reinmuth
- Discovery site: Heidelberg Obs.
- Discovery date: 9 October 1931

Designations
- Pronunciation: /ˈfrɪziə/
- Named after: Frisia · Frisian Islands (Home of the Frisian people)
- Alternative designations: 1931 TV_{1} · 1933 BO; 1937 VN · 1948 SE; 1954 UC · 1959 RC; 1971 UE_{3}
- Minor planet category: main-belt · (outer); Themis

Orbital characteristics
- Epoch 4 September 2017 (JD 2458000.5)
- Uncertainty parameter 0
- Observation arc: 85.48 yr (31,220 days)
- Aphelion: 3.8295 AU
- Perihelion: 2.4952 AU
- Semi-major axis: 3.1624 AU
- Eccentricity: 0.2110
- Orbital period (sidereal): 5.62 yr (2,054 days)
- Mean anomaly: 78.227°
- Mean motion: 0° 10^{m} 31.08^{s} / day
- Inclination: 1.3468°
- Longitude of ascending node: 40.015°
- Argument of perihelion: 355.23°

Physical characteristics
- Dimensions: 18.71 km (calculated); 19.09±0.19 km 21.682±0.043 km 22.995±0.121 km 24.00±7.16 km
- Synodic rotation period: 14.557±0.002 h 18.500±0.0096 h
- Geometric albedo: 0.04±0.03; 0.077±0.012; 0.08 (assumed); 0.0839±0.0105
- Spectral type: C (assumed)
- Absolute magnitude (H): 11.5 · 12.00 · 12.02±0.26 · 12.088±0.001 (R) · 12.13

1253 Frisia, provisional designation 1931 TV_{1}, is a carbonaceous Themistian asteroid from the outer regions of the asteroid belt, approximately 20 kilometers in diameter. Discovered by Karl Reinmuth at Heidelberg Observatory in 1931, the asteroid was later named after the region of Frisia and the Frisian Islands.

== Discovery ==
Frisia was discovered on 9 October 1931, by German astronomer Karl Reinmuth at the Heidelberg-Königstuhl State Observatory in southwest Germany. It was independently discovered by Soviet astronomer Pelageya Shajn at the Simeiz Observatory on the Crimean peninsula on 6 November 1931. The body's observation arc begins at Heidelberg eleven days after its official discovery observation.

== Orbit and classification ==
Frisia is a Themistian asteroid that belongs to the Themis family (602), a very large family of carbonaceous asteroids, named after 24 Themis. It orbits the Sun in the outer main-belt at a distance of 2.5–3.8 AU once every 5 years and 7 months (2,054 days). Its orbit has an eccentricity of 0.21 and an inclination of 1° with respect to the ecliptic.

== Physical characteristics ==
Frisia is an assumed carbonaceous C-type asteroid, which corresponds to the overall spectral type of the Themis family.

=== Rotation period ===
In November 2011, a rotational lightcurve of Frisia was obtained by astronomers at the University of North Dakota (730) and the Badlands Observatory in North Dakota, United States. Lightcurve analysis gave a rotation period of 14.557 hours with a brightness variation of 0.16 magnitude (U=2). Photometric observations in the R-band at the Palomar Transient Factory in September 2011, gave a somewhat similar period of 18.500 hours and an amplitude of 0.15 magnitude (U=2).

=== Diameter and albedo ===
According to the survey carried out by the NEOWISE mission of NASA's Wide-field Infrared Survey Explorer, Frisia measures between 19.09 and 24.00 kilometers in diameter and its surface has an albedo between 0.04 and 0.0839.

The Collaborative Asteroid Lightcurve Link assumes an albedo of 0.08 and calculates a diameter of 18.71 kilometers based on an absolute magnitude of 12.0.

== Naming ==
This minor planet was named after region of Frisia and its Frisian Islands, located on the southeastern coast of the North Sea. The region is the homeland of the Frisian people and mostly part of the Netherlands but its islands stretch along the coast up to Germany and Denmark. The official naming citation was mentioned in The Names of the Minor Planets by Paul Herget in 1955 (H 115).
