= 1632 Sieböhme =

Asteroid and relatively slow rotator

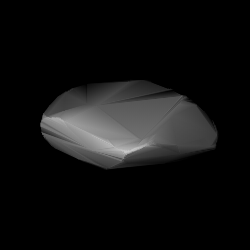
- Shape model of Sieböhme from its lightcurve

Discovery
- Discovered by: K. Reinmuth
- Discovery site: Heidelberg Obs.
- Discovery date: 26 February 1941

Designations
- Named after: Siegfried Böhme (astronomer)
- Alternative designations: 1941 DF · 1930 UJ; 1942 JC · 1947 RB; 1951 MN · 1956 TM; A917 SO
- Minor planet category: main-belt · (middle)

Orbital characteristics
- Epoch 4 September 2017 (JD 2458000.5)
- Uncertainty parameter 0
- Observation arc: 99.22 yr (36,239 days)
- Aphelion: 3.0198 AU
- Perihelion: 2.2915 AU
- Semi-major axis: 2.6557 AU
- Eccentricity: 0.1371
- Orbital period (sidereal): 4.33 yr (1,581 days)
- Mean anomaly: 68.735°
- Mean motion: 0° 13^{m} 39.72^{s} / day
- Inclination: 5.7171°
- Longitude of ascending node: 199.80°
- Argument of perihelion: 127.21°

Physical characteristics
- Dimensions: 25.16±7.20 km 26.05±8.68 km 26.56 km (derived); 28.842±0.383 km 29.351±0.105 km 29.38±0.41 km
- Synodic rotation period: 56.65±0.04 h 56.81±0.01 h 56.8129±0.1652 h
- Geometric albedo: 0.043±0.008; 0.0477 (derived); 0.05±0.03; 0.05±0.04; 0.060±0.003; 0.0643±0.0074
- Spectral type: S
- Absolute magnitude (H): 11.3 · 11.597±0.002 (R) · 11.7 · 11.80 · 11.80±0.24

1632 Sieböhme, provisional designation 1941 DF, is an asteroid and relatively slow rotator from the middle region of the asteroid belt, approximately 27 kilometers in diameter. It was discovered on 26 February 1941, by German astronomer Karl Reinmuth at Heidelberg Observatory in southern Germany. It was later named after ARI-astronomer Siegfried Böhme.

== Orbital characteristics ==
Sieböhme orbits the Sun in the central main-belt at a distance of 2.3–3.0 AU once every 4 years and 4 months (1,581 days). Its orbit has an eccentricity of 0.14 and an inclination of 6° with respect to the ecliptic. In 1907, the body was first identified as A917 SO at the Crimean Simeis Observatory, extending its observation arc by 34 years prior to its official discovery observation.

== Physical characteristics ==
In August 2012, two rotational lightcurves of Sieböhme were obtained at the Palomar Transient Factory in California, and by Italian astronomer Albino Carbognani. These lightcurves gave a rotation period of 56.8129 and 56.81 hours with a brightness variation of 0.44 and 0.45 magnitude, respectively (U=2/2). One month later, photometric observations by amateur astronomer Pierre Antonini gave a period of 56.65 hours and an amplitude of 0.47 magnitude (U=2). As most minor planets rotate within 2 to 20 hours around their axis, Sieböhme has a relatively long period, despite not being a slow rotator.

According to the survey carried out by NASA's Wide-field Infrared Survey Explorer with its subsequent NEOWISE mission, Sieböhme measures between 25.16 and 29.38 kilometers in diameter, and its surface has an albedo between 0.043 and 0.064. The Collaborative Asteroid Lightcurve Link (CALL) derives an albedo of 0.0477 and a diameter of 26.56 kilometers with an absolute magnitude of 11.80. Although CALL derives an albedo that is darker than that of a carbonaceous asteroid, it classifies Sieböhme as a stony asteroid.

== Naming ==
This minor planet was named in honor of German astronomer Siegfried Böhme (1909–1996), staff member at Astronomisches Rechen-Institut in Heidelberg since 1949. He improved upon the orbital elements of many asteroids, in particular upon 919 Ilsebill. The official naming citation was published by the Minor Planet Center on 20 February 1976 (M.P.C. 3931).
