= 1104 Syringa =

Main-belt asteroid

Discovery
- Discovered by: K. Reinmuth
- Discovery site: Heidelberg Obs.
- Discovery date: 9 December 1928

Designations
- Pronunciation: /sɪˈrɪŋɡə/
- Named after: Syringa (flowering plant)
- Alternative designations: 1928 XA
- Minor planet category: main-belt · (middle) background

Orbital characteristics
- Epoch 23 March 2018 (JD 2458200.5)
- Uncertainty parameter 0
- Observation arc: 88.80 yr (32,435 days)
- Aphelion: 3.5342 AU
- Perihelion: 1.7257 AU
- Semi-major axis: 2.6299 AU
- Eccentricity: 0.3438
- Orbital period (sidereal): 4.27 yr (1,558 days)
- Mean anomaly: 351.89°
- Mean motion: 0° 13^{m} 51.96^{s} / day
- Inclination: 6.4413°
- Longitude of ascending node: 128.66°
- Argument of perihelion: 277.48°

Physical characteristics
- Mean diameter: 19.711±0.260 km 22.10±0.7 km 22.13 km (derived); 23.244±0.213 km 24.20±0.53 km 24.30±1.17 km
- Synodic rotation period: 5.1547±0.0012 h
- Geometric albedo: 0.031±0.003; 0.033±0.006; 0.036±0.008; 0.0362±0.002; 0.0434 (derived); 0.0450±0.0064
- Spectral type: SMASS = Xk · X · P
- Absolute magnitude (H): 12.30; 12.35±0.29; 12.50

1104 Syringa, provisional designation 1928 XA, is a dark background asteroid from the central regions of the asteroid belt, approximately 23 kilometers in diameter. It was discovered on 9 December 1928, by German astronomer Karl Reinmuth at the Heidelberg-Königstuhl State Observatory in southwest Germany. The asteroid was named after the flowering plant Syringa (lilac).

== Orbit and classification ==
Syringa is a non-family asteroid from the main belt's background population. It orbits the Sun in the intermediate asteroid belt at a distance of 1.7–3.5 AU once every 4 years and 3 months (1,558 days; semi-major axis of 2.63 AU). Its orbit has an eccentricity of 0.34 and an inclination of 6° with respect to the ecliptic. For a main-belt asteroid, it has a rather high eccentricity. The body's observation arc begins at Heidelberg on 1 January 1929, three weeks after its official discovery observation.

== Physical characteristics ==
In the SMASS classification, Syringa is a Xk-subtype that transitions between the X- and the dark and uncommon K-type asteroids. It has also been characterized as an X-type by Pan-STARRS' photometric survey, and as a primitive P-type asteroid by the Wide-field Infrared Survey Explorer (WISE).

=== Rotation period ===
In February 2006, a rotational lightcurve of Syringa was obtained from photometric observations at the Calvin–Rehoboth Observatory in New Mexico, United States. Lightcurve analysis gave a well-defined rotation period of 5.1547 hours with a brightness amplitude of 0.27 magnitude (U=3).

=== Diameter and albedo ===
According to the surveys carried out by the Infrared Astronomical Satellite IRAS, the Japanese Akari satellite and the NEOWISE mission of NASA's WISE telescope, Syringa measures between 19.711 and 24.30 kilometers in diameter and its surface has a low albedo between 0.031 and 0.045. The Collaborative Asteroid Lightcurve Link derives an albedo of 0.0434 and a diameter of 22.13 kilometers based on an absolute magnitude of 12.3.

== Naming ==
This minor planet was named after a genus of flowering plants, Syringa, of the family Oleaceae. The most common member of Syringa is Syringa vulgaris (common lilac). The official naming citation was mentioned in The Names of the Minor Planets by Paul Herget in 1955 (H 104).

=== Reinmuth's flowers ===
Due to his many discoveries, Karl Reinmuth submitted a large list of 66 newly named asteroids in the early 1930s. The list covered his discoveries with numbers between (1009) and (1200). This list also contained a sequence of 28 asteroids, starting with 1054 Forsytia, that were all named after plants, in particular flowering plants (also see list of minor planets named after animals and plants).
