= 1837 Osita =

Stony main-belt asteroid

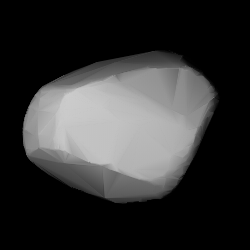
- Shape model of Osita from its lightcurve

Discovery
- Discovered by: J. Gibson
- Discovery site: El Leoncito Complex
- Discovery date: 16 August 1971

Designations
- Named after: Ursula Gibson (astronomer's wife)
- Alternative designations: 1971 QZ_{1} · 1962 XQ; 1968 QB_{1} · 1972 YJ_{1}
- Minor planet category: main-belt · Flora

Orbital characteristics
- Epoch 4 September 2017 (JD 2458000.5)
- Uncertainty parameter 0
- Observation arc: 54.27 yr (19,823 days)
- Aphelion: 2.3955 AU
- Perihelion: 2.0158 AU
- Semi-major axis: 2.2057 AU
- Eccentricity: 0.0861
- Orbital period (sidereal): 3.28 yr (1,196 days)
- Mean anomaly: 93.913°
- Mean motion: 0° 18^{m} 3.24^{s} / day
- Inclination: 3.8455°
- Longitude of ascending node: 280.93°
- Argument of perihelion: 315.11°

Physical characteristics
- Dimensions: 7.14 km (calculated); 7.530±0.119; 7.693±0.061 km 7.85±0.29 km 7.94±0.58 km
- Synodic rotation period: 3.8186±0.0020 h 3.81862±0.0001; 3.81880±0.00005 h
- Geometric albedo: 0.194±0.030; 0.198±0.024; 0.2067±0.0254; 0.216±0.019; 0.24 (assumed)
- Spectral type: AQ · S
- Absolute magnitude (H): 12.674±0.001 (R) · 12.81±0.23 · 12.9

1837 Osita (prov. designation: 1971 QZ_{1}) is a stony Flora asteroid from the inner regions of the asteroid belt, approximately 7 kilometers in diameter. It was discovered on 16 August 1971, by American astronomer James Gibson at the Yale–Columbia Southern Station of the Leoncito Astronomical Complex in Argentina, who named it after his wife Ursula ("Osita").

== Orbit and classification ==
The S-type asteroid is a member of the Flora family, one of the largest groups of stony asteroids in the main-belt. It orbits the Sun in the inner main-belt at a distance of 2.0–2.4 AU once every 3 years and 3 months (1,196 days). Its orbit has an eccentricity of 0.09 and an inclination of 4° with respect to the ecliptic. Osita was first identified as 1962 XQ at Goethe Link Observatory in 1962, extending the body's observation arc by 9 years prior to its official discovery observation.

== Physical characteristics ==
PanSTARRS's large-scale survey also classified Osita as a rare AQ-type, having intermediate spectral characteristics of an A and Q type asteroid.

=== Rotation period ===
In February 2006, a rotational lightcurve of Osita was obtained from photometric observation by French amateur astronomer René Roy, giving a well-defined rotation period of 3.81880 hours with a brightness variation of 0.48 magnitude (U=3). Photometric observations in the R-band at the Palomar Transient Factory in October 2011, gave a concurring period of 3.8186 hours and an amplitude of 0.59 magnitude (U=2). A third period of 3.81880 hours was derived from a large international data-mining collaboration in February 2016 (U=n.a.).

=== Diameter and albedo ===
According to the surveys carried out by the Japanese Akari satellite and NASA's Wide-field Infrared Survey Explorer with its subsequent NEOWISE mission, Osita measures between 7.53 and 7.94 kilometers in diameter, and its surface has an albedo between 0.194 and 0.216.

The Collaborative Asteroid Lightcurve Link assumes an albedo of 0.24 – derived from 8 Flora, the largest member and namesake of this orbital family – and calculates a diameter of 7.14 kilometers with an absolute magnitude of 12.9.

== Naming ==
This minor planet was named by the discoverer for his wife Ursula ("Osita" is the Spanish equivalent). She volunteered as an assistant and actively participated in the observations by measuring or reducing more than 150 positions of comets and minor planets. The official naming citation was published by the Minor Planet Center on 20 February 1976 (M.P.C. 3935).
