= 1335 Demoulina =

Stony Florian asteroid from the inner regions of the asteroid belt

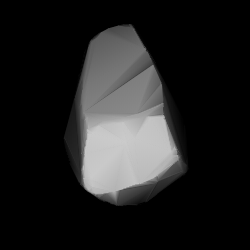
- Shape model of Demoulina from its lightcurve

Discovery
- Discovered by: K. Reinmuth
- Discovery site: Heidelberg Obs.
- Discovery date: 7 September 1934

Designations
- Named after: Prof. Demoulin (Belgian astronomer)
- Alternative designations: 1934 RE · 1954 RA
- Minor planet category: main-belt · (inner); Flora · background

Orbital characteristics
- Epoch 4 September 2017 (JD 2458000.5)
- Uncertainty parameter 0
- Observation arc: 82.66 yr (30,191 days)
- Aphelion: 2.5854 AU
- Perihelion: 1.8955 AU
- Semi-major axis: 2.2404 AU
- Eccentricity: 0.1540
- Orbital period (sidereal): 3.35 yr (1,225 days)
- Mean anomaly: 255.64°
- Mean motion: 0° 17^{m} 38.04^{s} / day
- Inclination: 2.5472°
- Longitude of ascending node: 172.62°
- Argument of perihelion: 198.89°

Physical characteristics
- Dimensions: 6.35±1.43 km 7.47 km (calculated); 7.484±0.130 km 7.684±0.133 km
- Synodic rotation period: 2.59±0.05 h (poor); 74.86±0.10 h
- Geometric albedo: 0.2073±0.0275; 0.218±0.043; 0.24 (assumed); 0.26±0.14
- Spectral type: S (assumed)
- Absolute magnitude (H): 12.8 · 12.9 · 13.06 · 13.89±0.74

1335 Demoulina, provisional designation 1934 RE, is a stony Florian asteroid from the inner regions of the asteroid belt, approximately 7 kilometers in diameter. Discovered by Karl Reinmuth at Heidelberg Observatory in 1934, the asteroid was named after Prof. Demoulin, a Belgian astronomer at Ghent University. It has a slower-than average spin rate of nearly 75 hours.

== Discovery ==
Demoulina was discovered on 7 September 1934, by German astronomer Karl Reinmuth at the Heidelberg-Königstuhl State Observatory in southwest Germany. Six nights later, it was independently discovered by Belgian astronomer Eugène Delporte at Uccle Observatory on 13 September 1934. The Minor Planet Center only recognizes the first discoverer.

== Orbit and classification ==
Demoulina is a member of the Flora family (402), a giant asteroid family and the largest family of stony asteroids in the asteroid belt. However, it is a non-family asteroid of the main belt's background population when applying the Hierarchical Clustering Method to its proper orbital elements.

It orbits the Sun in the inner asteroid belt at a distance of 1.9–2.6 AU once every 3 years and 4 months (1,225 days; semi-major axis of 2.24 AU). Its orbit has an eccentricity of 0.15 and an inclination of 3° with respect to the ecliptic. The body's observation arc begins with its official discovery observation at Heidelberg in 1934.

== Physical characteristics ==
Demoulina is an assumed S-type asteroid.

=== Rotation period ===
In February 2006, a rotational lightcurve of Demoulina was obtained from photometric observations by American astronomers Lawrence Molnar and Melissa Haegert at the Calvin–Rehoboth Observatory in New Mexico. Lightcurve analysis gave a rotation period of 74.86 hours with a brightness amplitude of 0.78 magnitude (U=2+). While not being a slow rotator, Demoulina's period is significantly longer than that for most asteroids. Its high brightness amplitude also indicates that it has an irregular or elongated shape.

Other photometric lightcurves which are based on a single night of observation are rated poorly (U=1).

=== Diameter and albedo ===
According to the survey carried out by the NEOWISE mission of NASA's Wide-field Infrared Survey Explorer, Demoulina measures between 6.35 and 7.684 kilometers in diameter and its surface has an albedo between 0.2073 and 0.26.

The Collaborative Asteroid Lightcurve Link assumes an albedo of 0.24 – derived from 8 Flora, the parent body of the Flora family, and calculates a diameter of 7.47 kilometers based on an absolute magnitude of 12.8.

== Naming ==
This minor planet was named after Prof. Demoulin, a Belgian astronomer at Ghent University. The official naming citation was mentioned in The Names of the Minor Planets by Paul Herget in 1955 (H 121).
