= 1076 Viola =

Main-belt asteroid

Discovery
- Discovered by: K. Reinmuth
- Discovery site: Heidelberg Obs.
- Discovery date: 5 October 1926

Designations
- Pronunciation: /ˈvaɪ.ələ/
- Named after: Viola (flowering plant)
- Alternative designations: 1926 TE
- Minor planet category: main-belt · (inner); Nysa-Polana complex · background

Orbital characteristics
- Epoch 4 September 2017 (JD 2458000.5)
- Uncertainty parameter 0
- Observation arc: 90.48 yr (33,048 days)
- Aphelion: 2.8323 AU
- Perihelion: 2.1164 AU
- Semi-major axis: 2.4744 AU
- Eccentricity: 0.1447
- Orbital period (sidereal): 3.89 yr (1,422 days)
- Mean anomaly: 70.608°
- Mean motion: 0° 15^{m} 11.52^{s} / day
- Inclination: 3.3195°
- Longitude of ascending node: 143.71°
- Argument of perihelion: 304.08°

Physical characteristics
- Dimensions: 21.412±7.130 km 21.43±6.81 km 22.0±2.2 km 22.273±0.069 km 22.298±0.117 km 22.63±2.7 km 23.57±7.70 km 24±2 km 26.39±0.61 km
- Synodic rotation period: 7.336 h
- Geometric albedo: 0.032±0.002; 0.0375±0.0535; 0.04±0.01; 0.04±0.02; 0.04±0.05; 0.041±0.004; 0.0415±0.012; 0.0428±0.0046
- Spectral type: Tholen = F SMASS = C B–V = 0.629; U–B = 0.250
- Absolute magnitude (H): 12.21 · 12.30

1076 Viola /ˈvaɪ.ələ/, provisional designation 1926 TE, is an asteroid from the inner regions of the asteroid belt, approximately 22 kilometers in diameter. It was discovered on 5 October 1926, by German astronomer Karl Reinmuth at the Heidelberg Observatory in southwest Germany. The asteroid was named after the flowering plant Viola.

== Orbit and classification ==
Viola is a non-family asteroid of the main belt's background population when applying the Hierarchical Clustering Method to its proper orbital elements. The asteroid has also been classified as a member of the Nysa–Polana complex, a collection of overlapping asteroid families in the inner main belt. The family is located near the Kirkwood gap (3:1 orbital resonance with Jupiter), a depleted zone that separates the central main belt.

Viola orbits the Sun in the inner asteroid belt at a distance of 2.1–2.8 AU once every 3 years and 11 months (1,422 days; semi-major axis of 2.47 AU). Its orbit has an eccentricity of 0.14 and an inclination of 3° with respect to the ecliptic. The body's observation arc begins at Heidelberg in January 1951, or more than 24 years after its official discovery observation.

== Physical characteristics ==
In the Tholen classification, Viola is a rare F-type asteroid, while in the SMASS taxonomy, it is classified as a common, carbonaceous C-type.

=== Rotation period ===
In the 1980s, a rotational lightcurve of Viola was obtained from photometric observations by American astronomer Richard Binzel. Lightcurve analysis gave a well-defined rotation period of 7.336 hours with a brightness amplitude of 0.12 magnitude (U=3). A tentative period of 14.4 hours was measured by French amateur astronomer René Roy in January 2009, but later retracted from the LCDB (U=n.a.).

=== Diameter and albedo ===
According to the surveys carried out by the Infrared Astronomical Satellite IRAS, the Japanese Akari satellite and the NEOWISE mission of NASA's Wide-field Infrared Survey Explorer, Viola measures between 21.412 and 26.39 kilometers in diameter and its surface has an albedo between 0.032 and 0.0428.

The Collaborative Asteroid Lightcurve Link adopts the results obtained by IRAS, that is, an albedo of 0.0415 and a diameter of 22.63 kilometers based on an absolute magnitude of 12.30.

== Naming ==
This minor planet was named after Viola, a genus of flowering plants within the violet family. The official naming citation was mentioned in The Names of the Minor Planets by Paul Herget in 1955 (H 102).

=== Reinmuth's flowers ===
Due to his many discoveries, Karl Reinmuth submitted a large list of 66 newly named asteroids in the early 1930s. The list covered his discoveries with numbers between (1009) and (1200). This list also contained a sequence of 28 asteroids, starting with 1054 Forsytia, that were all named after plants, in particular flowering plants.
