= 1187 Afra =

Main-belt asteroid

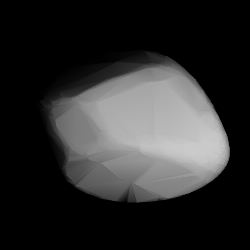
- Modelled shape of Afra from its lightcurve

Discovery
- Discovered by: K. Reinmuth
- Discovery site: Heidelberg Obs.
- Discovery date: 6 December 1929

Designations
- Named after: unknown
- Alternative designations: 1929 XC
- Minor planet category: main-belt · (middle); background

Orbital characteristics
- Epoch 31 May 2020 (JD 2459000.5)
- Uncertainty parameter 0
- Observation arc: 90.16 yr (32,932 d)
- Aphelion: 3.2285 AU
- Perihelion: 2.0523 AU
- Semi-major axis: 2.6404 AU
- Eccentricity: 0.2227
- Orbital period (sidereal): 4.29 yr (1,567 d)
- Mean anomaly: 52.040°
- Mean motion: 0° 13^{m} 46.92^{s} / day
- Inclination: 10.697°
- Longitude of ascending node: 327.16°
- Argument of perihelion: 74.956°

Physical characteristics
- Mean diameter: 31.83±3.9 km; 31.96±0.33 km; 32.348±0.299 km
- Synodic rotation period: 14.06993±0.00001 h; 14.0701±0.0005 h; 14.09±0.02 h; 14.645±0.006 h
- Geometric albedo: 0.051±0.007; 0.0527; 0.053
- Spectral type: SMASS = X
- Absolute magnitude (H): 11.50

1187 Afra (prov. designation: 1929 XC) is a dark background asteroid from the central regions of the asteroid belt. It was discovered by German astronomer Karl Reinmuth at Heidelberg Observatory on 6 December 1929. The X-type asteroid has a rotation period of 14.1 hours and measures approximately 32 kilometers (20 miles) in diameter. The origin of the asteroid's name remains unknown.

== Orbit and classification ==
Afra is a non-family asteroid of the main belt's background population when applying the hierarchical clustering method to its proper orbital elements. It orbits the Sun in the central asteroid belt at a distance of 2.1–3.2 AU once every 4 years and 3 months (1,567 days; semi-major axis of 2.64 AU). Its orbit has an eccentricity of 0.22 and an inclination of 11° with respect to the ecliptic. The body's observation arc begins at Heidelberg in January 1930, seven weeks after its official discovery observation.

== Naming ==
It is not known to what person, group of persons, or occurrence the name "Afra" refers to.

=== Unknown meaning ===
Among the many thousands of named minor planets, Afra is one of 120 asteroids, for which no official naming citation has been published. All of these low-numbered asteroids have numbers between 164 Eva and 1514 Ricouxa and were discovered between 1876 and the 1930s, predominantly by astronomers Auguste Charlois, Johann Palisa, Max Wolf and Karl Reinmuth.

== Physical characteristics ==
The lightcurve of Afra shows a periodicity of 14.09±0.02 hours, during which time the brightness of the object varies by 0.40±0.02 in magnitude.
