= 1739 Meyermann =

Main-belt asteroid

Discovery
- Discovered by: K. Reinmuth
- Discovery site: Heidelberg Obs.
- Discovery date: 15 August 1939

Designations
- Named after: Bruno Meyermann (German astronomer)
- Alternative designations: 1939 PF · 1929 TB_{1} 1935 GN · 1952 HN_{3} 1953 XO_{1} · 1963 TG
- Minor planet category: main-belt · Flora

Orbital characteristics
- Epoch 4 September 2017 (JD 2458000.5)
- Uncertainty parameter 0
- Observation arc: 87.57 yr (31,984 days)
- Aphelion: 2.5407 AU
- Perihelion: 1.9812 AU
- Semi-major axis: 2.2610 AU
- Eccentricity: 0.1237
- Orbital period (sidereal): 3.40 yr (1,242 days)
- Mean anomaly: 26.730°
- Mean motion: 0° 17^{m} 23.64^{s} / day
- Inclination: 3.4093°
- Longitude of ascending node: 203.35°
- Argument of perihelion: 82.116°

Physical characteristics
- Dimensions: 6.62±0.79 km 7.47 km (calculated); 7.858±0.124; 8.688±0.063 km
- Synodic rotation period: 2.8212±0.0002 h (Note: Pravec (2014) web: rotation period 2.8212±0.0002 hours with a brightness amplitude of 0.17. Quality Code of 3. Summary figures at Asteroid Lightcurve Database); 2.8219±0.0002 h (Note: Pravec (2007) web: rotation period 2.8219±0.0002 hours with a brightness amplitude of 0.22. Quality Code of 3. Summary figures at Asteroid Lightcurve Database)
- Geometric albedo: 0.1961±0.0376; 0.24 (assumed); 0.254±0.015; 0.336±0.116
- Spectral type: S
- Absolute magnitude (H): 12.63±0.27 · 12.7 · 12.8

1739 Meyermann, provisional designation 1939 PF, is a stony Florian asteroid from the inner regions of the asteroid belt, approximately 7.5 kilometers in diameter. It was discovered by German astronomer Karl Reinmuth at Heidelberg Observatory on 15 August 1939. It was later named in memory of astronomer Bruno Meyermann.

== Orbit and classification ==
Meyermann is a member of the Flora family, a large group of S-type asteroids in the inner main-belt. It orbits the Sun at a distance of 2.0–2.5 AU once every 3 years and 5 months (1,242 days). Its orbit has an eccentricity of 0.12 and an inclination of 3° with respect to the ecliptic. Meyermann was first identified as 1929 TB_{1} at Lowell Observatory in 1929, extending the body's observation arc by 10 years prior to its official discovery observation at Heidelberg.

=== Rotation period ===
Two rotational lightcurves of Meyermann were obtained from photometric observations taken by Czech astronomer Petr Pravec at Ondřejov Observatory in 2007 and 2014. They gave a rotation period of 2.8212 and 2.8219 hours with a brightness variation of 0.12 and 0.17 magnitude, respectively (U=3/3).

=== Diameter and albedo ===
According to the refitted 2014-results from the survey carried out by the Wide-field Infrared Survey Explorer with its NEOWISE missions, Meyermann measures 7.858 kilometers in diameter, and its surface has an albedo of 0.254. The Collaborative Asteroid Lightcurve Link assumes an albedo of 0.24 – derived from 8 Flora, the largest member and namesake of its family – and calculates a diameter of 7.47 kilometers based on an absolute magnitude of 12.8.

== Naming ==
This minor planet was named in memory of Bruno Meyermann (1876–1963), a classical astronomer and academic teacher at Göttingen Observatory in Lower Saxony, Germany. His fields of interest included polar motion and relativistic effects. The official naming citation was published by the Minor Planet Center on 18 April 1977 (M.P.C. 4155).
