= 1043 Beate =

Stony asteroid

Discovery
- Discovered by: K. Reinmuth
- Discovery site: Heidelberg Obs.
- Discovery date: 22 April 1925

Designations
- Pronunciation: German: [beːˈʔaːtə]
- Named after: unknown
- Alternative designations: 1925 HB
- Minor planet category: main-belt · (outer)

Orbital characteristics
- Epoch 4 September 2017 (JD 2458000.5)
- Uncertainty parameter 0
- Observation arc: 92.20 yr (33,677 days)
- Aphelion: 3.2214 AU
- Perihelion: 2.9717 AU
- Semi-major axis: 3.0966 AU
- Eccentricity: 0.0403
- Orbital period (sidereal): 5.45 yr (1,990 days)
- Mean anomaly: 255.00°
- Mean motion: 0° 10^{m} 51.24^{s} / day
- Inclination: 8.9257°
- Longitude of ascending node: 159.31°
- Argument of perihelion: 154.71°

Physical characteristics
- Dimensions: 31.60±1.3 km 31.85 km (derived); 31.986±0.075 km 33.97±0.43 km 34.08±1.11 km 40.952±0.967 km
- Synodic rotation period: 14.6±0.1 h 44.3±0.1 h (Note: Lightcurve plot of 1043 Beate, Palmer Divide Observatory, Brian D. Warner (2006))
- Geometric albedo: 0.1283±0.0193; 0.188±0.006; 0.209±0.032; 0.2147±0.019; 0.241±0.038; 0.2517 (derived)
- Spectral type: Tholen = S · S B–V = 0.900; U–B = 0.455
- Absolute magnitude (H): 9.50 · 9.6 · 9.79 · 9.90±0.21

1043 Beate, provisional designation 1925 HB, is a stony asteroid from the outer region of the asteroid belt, approximately 32 kilometers in diameter. It was discovered by German astronomer Karl Reinmuth at the Heidelberg-Königstuhl State Observatory on 22 April 1925. Any reference of its name to a person is unknown.

== Orbit and classification ==
Beate orbits the Sun in the outer main-belt at a distance of 3.0–3.2 AU once every 5 years and 5 months (1,990 days). Its orbit has an eccentricity of 0.04 and an inclination of 9° with respect to the ecliptic. The asteroid's observation arc begins at the discovering observatory in May 1925, 3 weeks after its official discovery observation.

== Physical characteristics ==
In the Tholen classification, Beate is a common S-type asteroid.

=== Rotation period ===
In April 2006, a rotational lightcurve of Beate was obtained from photometric observations by American astronomer Brian Warner at his Palmer Divide Observatory (716) in Colorado. It gave a longer-than average rotation period of 44.3±0.1 hours with a brightness variation of 0.47 magnitude (U=2+).

=== Diameter and albedo ===
According to the surveys carried out by the Infrared Astronomical Satellite IRAS, the Japanese Akari satellite, and NASA's Wide-field Infrared Survey Explorer with its subsequent NEOWISE mission, Beate measures between 31.6 and 41.0 kilometers in diameter and its surface has an albedo between 0.128 and 0.241. The Collaborative Asteroid Lightcurve Link derives an albedo of 0.2517 and a diameter of 31.85 kilometers with an absolute magnitude of 9.6.

== Naming ==
For this minor planet, any reference of its name to a person or occurrence is unknown.

=== Unknown meaning ===
Among the many thousands of named minor planets, Beate is one of 120 asteroids, for which no official naming citation has been published. All of these low-numbered asteroids have numbers between 164 Eva and 1514 Ricouxa and were discovered between 1876 and the 1930s, predominantly by astronomers Auguste Charlois, Johann Palisa, Max Wolf and Karl Reinmuth.
