= 1077 Campanula =

Main-belt asteroid

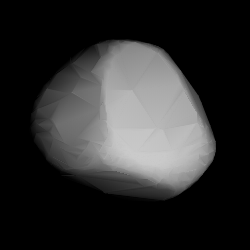
- Shape model of Campanula from its lightcurve

Discovery
- Discovered by: K. Reinmuth
- Discovery site: Heidelberg Obs.
- Discovery date: 6 October 1926

Designations
- Pronunciation: /kæmˈpænjʊlə/
- Named after: Campanula (bellflower)
- Alternative designations: 1926 TK · 1957 AJ; 1972 CB
- Minor planet category: main-belt · (inner); Erigone

Orbital characteristics
- Epoch 4 September 2017 (JD 2458000.5)
- Uncertainty parameter 0
- Observation arc: 90.56 yr (33,077 days)
- Aphelion: 2.8655 AU
- Perihelion: 1.9220 AU
- Semi-major axis: 2.3938 AU
- Eccentricity: 0.1971
- Orbital period (sidereal): 3.70 yr (1,353 days)
- Mean anomaly: 218.36°
- Mean motion: 0° 15^{m} 57.96^{s} / day
- Inclination: 5.3941°
- Longitude of ascending node: 346.20°
- Argument of perihelion: 13.591°

Physical characteristics
- Mean diameter: 7.55±1.72 km 9±2 km 9.709±0.278 km
- Synodic rotation period: 3.847±0.002 h (Note: Higgins (2011) web: rotation period 3.847±0.002 hours with a brightness amplitude of 0.40±0.02 mag. Quality code is 3–. Summary figures for (1077) Campanula at the LCDB.); 3.850±0.001 h 3.850486±0.000001 h 3.85085±0.00005 h 3.852±0.002 h
- Pole ecliptic latitude: (178.0°, 76.0°) (λ_{1}/β_{1}); (313.0°, 59.0°) (λ_{2}/β_{2})
- Geometric albedo: 0.225±0.017; 0.2253±0.0169; 0.33±0.12
- Spectral type: S V–R = 0.400±0.070
- Absolute magnitude (H): 12.3

1077 Campanula, provisional designation 1926 TK, is a presumed Erigonian asteroid, approximately 9 kilometers (5.6 miles) in diameter, located in the inner region of the asteroid belt. It was discovered on 6 October 1926, by German astronomer Karl Reinmuth at the Heidelberg Observatory in southwest Germany. The asteroid was named after the bellflower Campanula.

== Classification and orbit ==
Campanula is considered to be a member of the Erigone family (406), which is named after 163 Erigone, while other sources classify it as a background asteroid, not associated to any known asteroid family. It orbits the Sun in the inner main-belt at a distance of 1.9–2.9 AU once every 3 years and 8 months (1,353 days). Its orbit has an eccentricity of 0.20 and an inclination of 5° with respect to the ecliptic. The body's observation arc begins at Heidelberg, 2 months after its official discovery observation.

== Naming ==
This minor planet was named for the bellflower Campanula. The official naming citation was mentioned in The Names of the Minor Planets by Paul Herget in 1955 (H 102).

=== Reinmuth's flowers ===
Due to his many discoveries, Karl Reinmuth submitted a large list of 66 newly named asteroids in the early 1930s. The list covered his discoveries with numbers between (1009) and (1200). This list also contained a sequence of 28 asteroids, starting with 1054 Forsytia, that were all named after plants, in particular flowering plants (also see list of minor planets named after animals and plants).

== Physical characteristics ==
Campanula is an assumed stony S-type asteroid, which is not in line with the darker C- and X-types seen among the Erigonian asteroids.

=== Rotation period and poles ===
Several rotational lightcurves of Campanula were obtained from photometric observations. Lightcurve analysis gave a rotation period of 3.847 to 3.852 hours with a brightness variation of 0.24 to 0.40 magnitude (U=3-/3/3/3). A 2016-published lightcurve, using modeled photometric data from the Lowell Photometric Database (LPD), gave a concurring period of 3.850486 hours (U=n.a.), as well as two spin axis of (178.0°, 76.0°) and (313.0°, 59.0°) in ecliptic coordinates (λ, β).

=== Diameter and albedo ===
According to observations taken at the Balzaretto Observatory (A81) and the survey carried out by the NEOWISE mission of NASA's Wide-field Infrared Survey Explorer, Campanula measures between 7.55 and 9.709 kilometers in diameter and its surface has an albedo between 0.225 and 0.33. The Collaborative Asteroid Lightcurve Link assumes a standard albedo for stony asteroids of 0.20 and calculates a diameter of 9.40 kilometers based on an absolute magnitude of 12.50.

== See also ==
- List of minor planets named after animals and plants § Plants
