= 1080 Orchis =

Main-belt asteroid

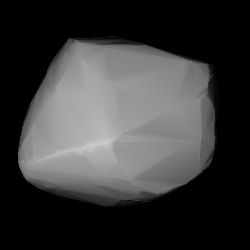
- Modelled shape of Orchis from its lightcurve

Discovery
- Discovered by: K. Reinmuth
- Discovery site: Heidelberg Obs.
- Discovery date: 30 August 1927

Designations
- Pronunciation: /ˈɔːrkɪs/
- Named after: Orchis (flowering plant)
- Alternative designations: 1927 QB · 1955 DT; A906 BH
- Minor planet category: main-belt · (inner) background

Orbital characteristics
- Epoch 4 September 2017 (JD 2458000.5)
- Uncertainty parameter 0
- Observation arc: 111.76 yr (40,821 days)
- Aphelion: 3.0452 AU
- Perihelion: 1.7924 AU
- Semi-major axis: 2.4188 AU
- Eccentricity: 0.2590
- Orbital period (sidereal): 3.76 yr (1,374 days)
- Mean anomaly: 278.54°
- Mean motion: 0° 15^{m} 43.2^{s} / day
- Inclination: 4.5873°
- Longitude of ascending node: 2.0437°
- Argument of perihelion: 57.028°

Physical characteristics
- Mean diameter: 20.755±8.470 km 21.797±0.130 km 21.86±0.26 km 22.918±0.241 km 23.28±1.7 km 23.53±6.59 km 24.62±6.75 km
- Synodic rotation period: 16.061±0.004 h 16.0657±0.0005 h 16.075±0.0207 h 16.1±0.1 h
- Pole ecliptic latitude: (255.0°, 27.0°) (λ_{1}/β_{1}); (71.0°, 28.0°) (λ_{2}/β_{2})
- Geometric albedo: 0.029±0.002; 0.03±0.02; 0.031±0.032; 0.0331±0.0028; 0.0430±0.007; 0.0508±0.0499; 0.051±0.001
- Spectral type: Tholen = F B–V = 0.624; U–B = 0.206
- Absolute magnitude (H): 12.133±0.002 (R) · 12.20 · 12.32 · 12.43

1080 Orchis, provisional designation 1927 QB, is a dark background asteroid from the inner regions of the asteroid belt. It was discovered on 30 August 1927, by German astronomer Karl Reinmuth at the Heidelberg Observatory in southwest Germany. The carbonaceous F-type asteroid has a rotation period of 16.1 hours and measures approximately 22 kilometers (14 miles) in diameter. It was named after the flowering plant Orchis.

== Orbit and classification ==
Orchis is a non-family asteroid of the main belt's background population. It orbits the Sun in the inner asteroid belt at a distance of 1.8–3.0 AU once every 3 years and 9 months (1,374 days; semi-major axis of 2.42 AU). Its orbit has an eccentricity of 0.26 and an inclination of 5° with respect to the ecliptic. The asteroid was first observed as A906 BH at Heidelberg in January 1906. The body's observation arc begins with its official discovery observation in August 1927.

== Naming ==
This minor planet was named after the flowering plant Orchis, a genus in the orchid family. The official naming citation was mentioned in The Names of the Minor Planets by Paul Herget in 1955 (H 102).

=== Reinmuth's flowers ===
Due to his many discoveries, Karl Reinmuth submitted a large list of 66 newly named asteroids in the early 1930s. The list covered his discoveries with numbers between (1009) and (1200). This list also contained a sequence of 28 asteroids, starting with 1054 Forsytia, that were all named after plants, in particular flowering plants (also see list of minor planets named after animals and plants).

== Physical characteristics ==
In the Tholen classification, Orchis is an uncommon F-type asteroid (or, called B-type in the SMASS classification, where F-type are grouped together under the B-type because they are not distinguishable as per the criteria used in that classification). This type belongs to the wider C-complex of carbonaceous asteroids.

=== Rotation period and poles ===
In 2010, three rotational lightcurves of Orchis were obtained from photometric observations. Lightcurve analysis gave a rotation period of 16.061, 16.075 and 16.1 hours with a brightness amplitude of between 0.23 and 0.31 magnitude (U=2+/2/3). A modeled lightcurve based on optical data from a large collaboration network found a concurring period of 16.0657 hours and two spin axis of (255.0°, 27.0°) and (71.0°, 28.0°) in ecliptic coordinates (λ, β).

=== Diameter and albedo ===
According to the surveys carried out by the Infrared Astronomical Satellite IRAS, the Japanese Akari satellite and the NEOWISE mission of NASA's Wide-field Infrared Survey Explorer, Orchis measures between 20.755 and 24.62 kilometers in diameter and its surface has an albedo between 0.029 and 0.051. The Collaborative Asteroid Lightcurve Link adopts the results obtained by IRAS, that is, an albedo of 0.0430 and a diameter of 23.28 kilometers based on an absolute magnitude of 12.2.
