= 1008 La Paz =

Asteroid

Discovery
- Discovered by: M. F. Wolf
- Discovery site: Heidelberg Obs.
- Discovery date: 31 October 1923

Designations
- Named after: La Paz (Bolivian capital)
- Alternative designations: 1923 PD · 1950 UN; 1970 JA
- Minor planet category: main-belt · (outer)

Orbital characteristics
- Epoch 4 September 2017 (JD 2458000.5)
- Uncertainty parameter 0
- Observation arc: 93.41 yr (34,118 days)
- Aphelion: 3.3333 AU
- Perihelion: 2.8495 AU
- Semi-major axis: 3.0914 AU
- Eccentricity: 0.0783
- Orbital period (sidereal): 5.44 yr (1,985 days)
- Mean anomaly: 70.925°
- Mean motion: 0° 10^{m} 52.68^{s} / day
- Inclination: 8.9362°
- Longitude of ascending node: 20.553°
- Argument of perihelion: 14.821°

Physical characteristics
- Dimensions: 38.54 km (derived); 38.64±2.7 km 39.02±0.66 km 40.13±13.98 km 41.061±0.240 km 45.450±0.245 km 49.27±17.54 km 50.50±0.91 km
- Synodic rotation period: 8.998±0.002 h 9.002±0.001 h
- Geometric albedo: 0.04±0.02; 0.048±0.002; 0.05±0.03; 0.0592±0.0140; 0.0684 (derived); 0.073±0.018; 0.0819±0.013; 0.099±0.015
- Spectral type: C
- Absolute magnitude (H): 10.40 · 10.50 · 10.60 · 10.74 · 10.92±0.75

La Paz (minor planet designation: 1008 La Paz), provisional designation 1923 PD, is a carbonaceous asteroid from the outer region of the asteroid belt, approximately 40 kilometers in diameter. It was discovered on 31 October 1923, by German astronomer Max Wolf at the Heidelberg-Königstuhl State Observatory and named after the city La Paz in Bolivia.

== Orbit and classification ==
La Paz is a background asteroid as it does not belong to any known asteroid family. It orbits the Sun in the outer main-belt at a distance of 2.8–3.3 AU once every 5 years and 5 months (1,985 days). Its orbit has an eccentricity of 0.08 and an inclination of 9° with respect to the ecliptic. The body's observation arc begins at Heidelberg, 10 days after its official discovery observation.

== Physical characteristics ==
La Paz is an assumed carbonaceous C-type asteroid.

=== Lightcurves ===
In November 2005, a rotational lightcurve of La Paz was obtained from photometric observations by French amateur astronomer René Roy. Lightcurve analysis gave a well-defined rotation period of 8.998 hours with a brightness amplitude of 0.14 magnitude (U=3). In March 2007, a concurring period of 9.002 hours and an amplitude of 0.14 magnitude (U=3-) was obtained by astronomers Roberto Crippa and Federico Manzini at the Sozzago Astronomical Station in Italy (A12).

=== Diameter and albedo ===
According to the surveys carried out by the Infrared Astronomical Satellite IRAS, the Japanese Akari satellite and the NEOWISE mission of NASA's Wide-field Infrared Survey Explorer, La Paz measures between 38.64 and 50.50 kilometers in diameter and its surface has an albedo between 0.04 and 0.099.

The Collaborative Asteroid Lightcurve Link derives an albedo of 0.0684 and a diameter of 38.54 kilometers based on an absolute magnitude of 10.6.

== Naming ==
This minor planet was named after La Paz, the capital city of Bolivia in South America. The official naming citation was mentioned in The Names of the Minor Planets by Paul Herget in 1955 (H 96).
