= 1661 Granule =

Asteroid

Discovery
- Discovered by: M. Wolf
- Discovery site: Heidelberg Obs.
- Discovery date: 31 March 1916

Designations
- Named after: Edward Gall (pathologist)
- Alternative designations: A916 FA · 1936 PM; 1949 QG_{1} · 1949 SJ; 1961 DB
- Minor planet category: main-belt · Flora

Orbital characteristics
- Epoch 4 September 2017 (JD 2458000.5)
- Uncertainty parameter 0
- Observation arc: 101.07 yr (36,915 days)
- Aphelion: 2.3818 AU
- Perihelion: 1.9857 AU
- Semi-major axis: 2.1838 AU
- Eccentricity: 0.0907
- Orbital period (sidereal): 3.23 yr (1,179 days)
- Mean anomaly: 121.10°
- Mean motion: 0° 18^{m} 19.44^{s} / day
- Inclination: 3.0353°
- Longitude of ascending node: 261.69°
- Argument of perihelion: 328.08°

Physical characteristics
- Dimensions: 7.14 km (calculated)
- Synodic rotation period: 24 h
- Geometric albedo: 0.24 (assumed)
- Spectral type: S
- Absolute magnitude (H): 12.9 · 12.99±0.22

1661 Granule, also designated A916 FA, is a stony Florian asteroid from the inner regions of the asteroid belt, approximately 7 kilometers in diameter. It was discovered on 31 March 1916, by German astronomer Max Wolf at Heidelberg Observatiry in southern Germany, and named for American pathologist Edward Gall.

== Classification and orbit ==
The S-type asteroid is a member of the Flora family, a large collisional population of stony asteroids in the inner main-belt. It orbits the Sun at a distance of 2.0–2.4 AU once every 3 years and 3 months (1,179 days). Its orbit has an eccentricity of 0.09 and an inclination of 3° with respect to the ecliptic. Granule's observation arc begins with its observation at Bergedorf Observatory, one month after its official discovery observation. (It is unclear whether "HD 17", Message from Heidelberg Observatory #17, is the official discovery observation due to a different time stamp).

== Physical characteristics ==
=== Rotation period ===
In January 2006, the first rotational light-curve of Granule was obtained from photometric observations by French amateur astronomer René Roy. It gave a longer-than average rotation period of 24 hours with a brightness variation of 0.15 magnitude (U=2). No other light-curves have been obtained yet.

=== Size estimates ===
Granule has neither been observed by the Infrared Astronomical Satellite IRAS, nor the Japanese Akari satellite, nor NASA's Wide-field Infrared Survey Explorer with its subsequent NEOWISE mission. The Collaborative Asteroid Lightcurve Link assumes an albedo of 0.24 – derived from the family's principal body and namesake, the asteroid 8 Flora – and calculates a diameter of 7.14 kilometers using an absolute magnitude of 12.9.

== Naming ==
This minor planet was named in honor of Edward A. Gall, an internationally renowned American pathologist, former director of the University of Cincinnati Academic Health Center and president of USCAP. It was named on the occasion of his retirement to commemorate his career and his discovery of the Gall's granule, a feature of lymphocytes. The official naming citation was published by the Minor Planet Center on 20 December 1974 (M.P.C. 3757).
