= 1806 Derice =

Stony main-belt asteroid

Discovery
- Discovery site: Perth Obs. (Bickley)
- Discovery date: 13 June 1971

Designations
- Named after: Derice Harwood (wife of astronomer)
- Alternative designations: 1971 LC · 1927 EB; 1942 TD · 1949 YD; 1967 EB
- Minor planet category: main-belt · Flora

Orbital characteristics
- Epoch 4 September 2017 (JD 2458000.5)
- Uncertainty parameter 0
- Observation arc: 67.44 yr (24,634 days)
- Aphelion: 2.4750 AU
- Perihelion: 1.9990 AU
- Semi-major axis: 2.2370 AU
- Eccentricity: 0.1064
- Orbital period (sidereal): 3.35 yr (1,222 days)
- Mean anomaly: 74.051°
- Mean motion: 0° 17^{m} 40.56^{s} / day
- Inclination: 3.8406°
- Longitude of ascending node: 271.10°
- Argument of perihelion: 193.78°

Physical characteristics
- Dimensions: 7.976±0.759; 10.14±0.41 km 10.697±0.061 km 10.7 km (derived)
- Synodic rotation period: 3.22352±0.00004 h (Note: Pravec, P.; Wolf, M.; Sarounova, L. (2009, 2011 and 2012) web publication. Summary figures listed at the Light Curve Data Base-(1806) Derice); 3.2236±0.0005 h 3.2237±0.0001 h 3.2240±0.0005 h 3.4602±0.0007 h
- Geometric albedo: 0.035±0.149; 0.2149; 0.2474±0.0669; 0.282±0.025
- Spectral type: S
- Absolute magnitude (H): 11.65±0.06 (R) · 12.00 · 12.1 · 12.14±0.078

1806 Derice, provisional designation 1971 LC, is a stony Flora asteroid from the inner regions of the asteroid belt, approximately 10 kilometers in diameter. Discovered on 13 June 1971, at the Bickley site of the Perth Observatory in Western Australia, it was the first discovery of a minor planet ever made in Oceania. The asteroid was named after the wife of Dennis Harwood, staff member at Bickley.

== Classification and orbit ==
The S-type asteroid is a member of the Flora family, one of the largest groups of stony asteroids in the main-belt. It orbits the Sun at a distance of 2.0–2.5 AU once every 3 years and 4 months (1,222 days). Its orbit has an eccentricity of 0.11 and an inclination of 4° with respect to the ecliptic. The first used precovery was taken at Palomar Observatory in 1949, extending the asteroid's observation arc by 22 years prior to its official discovery at Bickley. The first unused observation dates back to 1927, at Tokyo Observatory.

== Physical characteristics ==
=== Lightcurves ===
A large number of rotational lightcurves for this asteroid were obtained from several photometric observations. The first observations were made by Italian astronomer Silvano Casulli in November 2006, and gave a rotation period 3.4602±0.0007 hours with a brightness amplitude of 0.19 in magnitude (U=3).

One month later, in December 2006, observations at the Carbuncle Hill Observatory gave a period of 3.2240±0.0005 hours with an identical amplitude of 0.19 in magnitude (U=3).

Between November 2009 and December 2012, Czech astronomer Petr Pravec at Ondřejov Observatory obtained three more lightcurves with periods between 3.2235 and 3.2237 hours and corresponding amplitudes of 0.07. 0.10 and 0.10, respectively (U=3/3/3).

=== Diameter and albedo ===
According to the space-based surveys carried out by the Japanese Akari satellite and the NEOWISE mission of NASA's Wide-field Infrared Survey Explorer, the asteroid measures between 8.0 and 10.7 kilometers in diameter, respectively, and its surface has an albedo between 0.035 and 0.282. Astronomer Petr Pravec and the Collaborative Asteroid Lightcurve Link derive an albedo of 0.21 and a diameter of 10.7 kilometers with an absolute magnitude of 12.4.

== Naming ==
This minor planet was named after Derice Harwood, wife of Dennis Harwood, astrometric staff member of the discovering Perth Observatory. The official naming citation was published by the Minor Planet Center on 11 December 1981 (M.P.C. 6530).
