= 1469 Linzia =

Main-belt asteroid

Discovery
- Discovered by: K. Reinmuth
- Discovery site: Heidelberg Obs.
- Discovery date: 19 August 1938

Designations
- Pronunciation: /ˈlɪntsiə/
- Named after: Linz (Austrian city)
- Alternative designations: 1938 QD · 1931 JD; 1933 SM_{1} · 1936 FC_{1} 1949 OP_{1} · 1955 ST; 1955 UB · A916 QD
- Minor planet category: main-belt · (outer) background

Orbital characteristics
- Epoch 4 September 2017 (JD 2458000.5)
- Uncertainty parameter 0
- Observation arc: 86.40 yr (31,556 days)
- Aphelion: 3.3312 AU
- Perihelion: 2.9148 AU
- Semi-major axis: 3.1230 AU
- Eccentricity: 0.0667
- Orbital period (sidereal): 5.52 yr (2,016 days)
- Mean anomaly: 52.444°
- Mean motion: 0° 10^{m} 42.96^{s} / day
- Inclination: 13.398°
- Longitude of ascending node: 188.96°
- Argument of perihelion: 207.33°

Physical characteristics
- Dimensions: 54.30±16.67 km 58.78 km (derived); 58.99±2.5 km 59.021±0.518 km 66.05±21.19 km 67.66±0.80 km 74.78±0.36 km
- Synodic rotation period: 6.067 h (poor); 12 h (poor); 15.2±0.2 h 22.215±0.004 h
- Geometric albedo: 0.038±0.006; 0.056±0.002; 0.0561 (derived); 0.06±0.04; 0.0733±0.0123; 0.0734±0.007
- Spectral type: P · C (assumed)
- Absolute magnitude (H): 9.10±0.83 · 9.60 · 9.80 · 9.9 · 9.94

1469 Linzia, provisional designation 1938 QD, is a dark asteroid from the outer regions of the asteroid belt, approximately 60 kilometers in diameter. Discovered by Karl Reinmuth at Heidelberg Observatory in 1938, the asteroid was later named after the Austrian city of Linz.

== Discovery ==
Linzia was discovered on 19 August 1938, by German astronomer Karl Reinmuth at the Heidelberg-Königstuhl State Observatory in southwest Germany. Twelve nights later, the asteroid was independently discovered by Soviet astronomer Grigory Neujmin at the Simeiz Observatory, Crimea, on 31 August 1938. The Minor Planet Center only recognizes the first discoverer. The asteroid was first identified as A916 QD at Simeiz in August 1916, or 22 years prior to its official discovery.

== Orbit and classification ==
Linzia is a non-family asteroid from the main belt's background population. It orbits the Sun in the outer asteroid belt at a distance of 2.9–3.3 AU once every 5 years and 6 months (2,016 days). Its orbit has an eccentricity of 0.07 and an inclination of 13° with respect to the ecliptic. The body's observation arc begins at the discovering Heidelberg Observatory in May 1931, when it was identified as 1931 JD.

== Physical characteristics ==
Linzia has been characterized as a dark and primitive P-type asteroid by the Wide-field Infrared Survey Explorer (WISE), while the Lightcurve Data Base assumes it to be a carbonaceous C-type asteroid.

=== Rotation period ===
In September 2010, a rotational lightcurve of Linzia was obtained from photometric observations by Robert Stephens in collaboration with Vladimir Benishek. Lightcurve analysis gave a slightly longer-than average rotation period of 22.215 hours with a brightness amplitude of 0.09 magnitude (U=3). Other lightcurves which measured a period of 6.067, 12 and 15.2 hours, received a lower quality rating (U=1/1/2-).

=== Diameter and albedo ===
According to the surveys carried out by the Infrared Astronomical Satellite IRAS, the Japanese Akari satellite and the NEOWISE mission of NASA's WISE telescope, Linzia measures between 54.30 and 74.78 kilometers in diameter and its surface has an albedo between 0.038 and 0.0734.

The Collaborative Asteroid Lightcurve Link derives an albedo of 0.0561 and a diameter of 58.78 kilometers based on an absolute magnitude of 9.9.

== Naming ==
This minor planet was named in honor of the Austrian city of Linz, located on the Danube river. The name was proposed by A. Wersig (RI 2319), and the official naming citation was mentioned in The Names of the Minor Planets by Paul Herget in 1955 (H 132).
