= 1066 Lobelia =

Main-belt asteroid

Discovery
- Discovered by: K. Reinmuth
- Discovery site: Heidelberg Obs.
- Discovery date: 1 September 1926

Designations
- Pronunciation: /loʊˈbiːliə/
- Named after: Lobelia (flowering plant)
- Alternative designations: 1926 RA · 1941 SK; 1965 AL_{1} · A911 QB
- Minor planet category: main-belt · (inner) background

Orbital characteristics
- Epoch 4 September 2017 (JD 2458000.5)
- Uncertainty parameter 0
- Observation arc: 106.28 yr (38,818 d)
- Aphelion: 2.9050 AU
- Perihelion: 1.8990 AU
- Semi-major axis: 2.4020 AU
- Eccentricity: 0.2094
- Orbital period (sidereal): 3.72 yr (1,360 days)
- Mean anomaly: 146.53°
- Mean motion: 0° 15^{m} 52.92^{s} / day
- Inclination: 4.8237°
- Longitude of ascending node: 345.15°
- Argument of perihelion: 16.910°

Physical characteristics
- Dimensions: 6.014±0.404 km
- Geometric albedo: 0.488±0.079
- Absolute magnitude (H): 12.3

1066 Lobelia, provisional designation 1926 RA, is a bright background asteroid from the inner regions of the asteroid belt, approximately 6 kilometers in diameter. It was discovered on 1 September 1926, by astronomer Karl Reinmuth at the Heidelberg-Königstuhl State Observatory in Germany. The asteroid was named after the flowering plant Lobelia (lobelias).

== Orbit and classification ==
Lobelia is a non-family asteroid from the main belt's background population. It orbits the Sun in the inner main-belt at a distance of 1.9–2.9 AU once every 3 years and 9 months (1,360 days; semi-major axis of 2.40 AU). Its orbit has an eccentricity of 0.21 and an inclination of 5° with respect to the ecliptic.

The asteroid was first observed at Heidelberg as A911 QB in August 1911. The body's observation arc begins at Simeiz Observatory in October 1926, one month after its official discovery observation at Heidelberg.

== Physical characteristics ==
The asteroid's spectral type is unknown.

=== Rotation period ===
As of 2017, no rotational lightcurve of Lobelia was obtained from photometric observations. The body's rotation period, spin axis and shape remain unknown.

=== Diameter and albedo ===
According to the survey carried out by the NEOWISE mission of NASA's Wide-field Infrared Survey Explorer, Lobelia measures 6.014 kilometers in diameter and its surface has a high albedo of 0.488.

== Naming ==
This minor planet was named after the Indian tobacco flower, Lobelia, a genus of flowering plants also known as lobelias. The official naming citation was mentioned in The Names of the Minor Planets by Paul Herget in 1955 (H 101).

=== Reinmuth's flowers ===
Due to his many discoveries, Karl Reinmuth submitted a large list of 66 newly named asteroids in the early 1930s. The list covered his discoveries with numbers between (1009) and (1200). This list also contained a sequence of 28 asteroids, starting with 1054 Forsytia, that were all named after plants, in particular flowering plants (also see list of minor planets named after animals and plants).
