= 1619 Ueta =

Main-belt asteroid

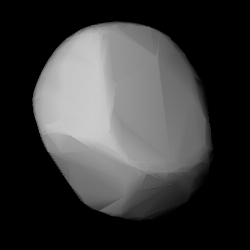
- Shape model of Ueta from its lightcurve

Discovery
- Discovered by: T. Mitani
- Discovery site: Kwasan Obs. (377)
- Discovery date: 11 October 1953

Designations
- Named after: Mr Ueta (observatory's director)
- Alternative designations: 1953 TA · 1926 RR; 1931 AO · 1940 YJ; 1951 AG_{1} · 1978 GM
- Minor planet category: main-belt · (inner)

Orbital characteristics
- Epoch 4 September 2017 (JD 2458000.5)
- Uncertainty parameter 0
- Observation arc: 85.68 yr (31,293 days)
- Aphelion: 2.6368 AU
- Perihelion: 1.8454 AU
- Semi-major axis: 2.2411 AU
- Eccentricity: 0.1766
- Orbital period (sidereal): 3.35 yr (1,225 days)
- Mean anomaly: 5.9446°
- Mean motion: 0° 17^{m} 37.68^{s} / day
- Inclination: 6.2142°
- Longitude of ascending node: 61.494°
- Argument of perihelion: 328.18°

Physical characteristics
- Dimensions: 7.13±0.40 km 8.965±0.124 km 9.927±0.066 km 11.04 km (calculated)
- Synodic rotation period: 2.717943±0.000005 h 2.7180±0.0005 h 2.718238±0.000001 h 2.720±0.002 h 2.720±0.005 h 2.94 h (dated)
- Geometric albedo: 0.20 (assumed); 0.2517±0.0317; 0.479±0.056
- Spectral type: Tholen = S · S B–V = 0.900; U–B = 0.546
- Absolute magnitude (H): 12.48±0.28 · 12.15

1619 Ueta, provisional designation 1953 TA, is a stony asteroid from the inner regions of the asteroid belt, approximately 11 kilometers in diameter. It was discovered on 11 October 1953, by Japanese astronomer Tetsuyasu Mitani at Kyoto University's Kwasan Observatory (377), near Kyoto, Japan. It was named after the former director of the discovering observatory.

== Classification and orbit ==
Ueta is a S-type asteroid, that orbits the Sun in the inner main-belt at a distance of 1.8–2.6 AU once every 3 years and 4 months (1,225 days). Its orbit has an eccentricity of 0.18 and an inclination of 6° with respect to the ecliptic.

It was first identified as 1926 RR at Johannesburg in 1926. Ueta's observation arc begins 22 years prior to its official discovery observation with a precovery taken at Lowell Observatory in 1931.

== Rotation period and pole ==
Several rotational lightcurves of Ueta were obtained from photometric observations. Best rated lightcurves were obtained by astronomers Robert Stephens and David Higgins in September 2009, securing an identical rotation period of 2.720 hours with a brightness variation of 0.35 and 0.39 magnitude, respectively (U=3/3). Modeled lightcurves from various photometric data sources also gave a similar period of 2.717943 and 2.718238 hours (U=n.a.).

== Diameter and albedo ==
According to the survey carried out by NASA's Wide-field Infrared Survey Explorer with its subsequent NEOWISE mission, Ueta measures between 7.13 and 9.93 kilometers in diameter, and its surface has an albedo between 0.251 and 0.479. The Collaborative Asteroid Lightcurve Link assumes a standard albedo for stony asteroids of 0.20 and calculates a diameter of 11.04 kilometers with an absolute magnitude of 12.15.

== Naming ==
Ueta was named by the discoverer for the former Director of Kwasan Observatory (also see § External links) who encouraged him to keep on with his observations of minor planets and comets. The official naming citation was published by the Minor Planet Center on 1 February 1965 (M.P.C. 2347).
