= 1251 Hedera =

Main-belt asteroid

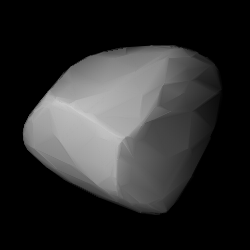
- Modelled shape of Hedera from its lightcurve

Discovery
- Discovered by: K. Reinmuth
- Discovery site: Heidelberg Obs.
- Discovery date: 25 January 1933

Designations
- Pronunciation: /ˈhɛdərə/
- Named after: Hedera (a.k.a. "Ivy")
- Alternative designations: 1933 BE · 1929 CD_{1} 1931 TJ_{2} · 1975 NW_{1} A907 GD · A915 CA
- Minor planet category: main-belt · (middle) background

Orbital characteristics
- Epoch 4 September 2017 (JD 2458000.5)
- Uncertainty parameter 0
- Observation arc: 102.80 yr (37,548 days)
- Aphelion: 3.1452 AU
- Perihelion: 2.2884 AU
- Semi-major axis: 2.7168 AU
- Eccentricity: 0.1577
- Orbital period (sidereal): 4.48 yr (1,636 days)
- Mean anomaly: 55.862°
- Mean motion: 0° 13^{m} 12.36^{s} / day
- Inclination: 6.0489°
- Longitude of ascending node: 140.65°
- Argument of perihelion: 217.52°

Physical characteristics
- Mean diameter: 13.239±0.150 km 44.22 km (calculated)
- Synodic rotation period: 15.015±0.010 h 19.9000±0.0002 h 19.9020±0.0001 h 19.9020±0.0002 h 19.915±0.005 h 19.915±0.007 h 19.985±0.002 h
- Geometric albedo: 0.057 (assumed); 0.636±0.050
- Spectral type: Tholen = E SMASS = X E · C(SDSS-MFB); B–V = 0.689; U–B = 0.233
- Absolute magnitude (H): 10.5 · 10.67±0.28

1251 Hedera (prov. designation: 1933 BE) is a background asteroid from the central regions of the asteroid belt, approximately 13 kilometers (8 miles) in diameter. It was discovered on 25 January 1933, by German astronomer Karl Reinmuth at the Heidelberg-Königstuhl State Observatory in southwest Germany. The asteroid was named for the climbing plant Hedera, commonly known as "ivy".

== Orbit and classification ==
Hedera is a non-family asteroid from the main belt's background population. It orbits the Sun in the central asteroid belt at a distance of 2.3–3.1 AU once every 4 years and 6 months (1,636 days; semi-major axis of 2.72 AU). Its orbit has an eccentricity of 0.16 and an inclination of 6° with respect to the ecliptic. The asteroid was first observed as A907 GD at Heidelberg in April 1907. The body's observation arc begins at Heidelberg, the night after its official discovery observation.

== Naming ==
This minor planet was named after the evergreen woody plant Hedera ("ivy") a genus of climbing or ground-creeping woody plants in the aralia family (ivy family). The naming was mentioned in The Names of the Minor Planets by Paul Herget in 1955 (H 115).

=== Reinmuth's flowers ===
Due to his many discoveries, Karl Reinmuth submitted a large list of 66 newly named asteroids in the early 1930s. The list covered his discoveries with numbers between (1009) and (1200). This list also contained a sequence of 28 asteroids, starting with 1054 Forsytia, that were all named after plants, in particular flowering plants (also see list of minor planets named after animals and plants).

== Physical characteristics ==
Hedera is an E-type and X-type asteroid in the Tholen and SMASS classification, respectively.

=== Rotation period ===
Several rotational lightcurves of Hedera have been obtained from photometric observations since 2007. Best-rated lightcurve by Julian Oey at Kingsgrove and Leura observatories, Australia, gave a rotation period of 19.9000 hours with a consolidated brightness amplitude between 0.41 and 0.61 magnitude (U=3-).

=== Spin axis ===
Modeled photometric data from the Lowell Photometric Database (LPD) and the robotic BlueEye600 Observatory, gave a concurring period of 19.9020 hours, Both studies determined two spin axes of (124.0°, −70.0°) and (266.0°, −62.0°), as well as (271.0°, −53.0°) and (115.0°, −62.0°) in ecliptic coordinates (λ, β).

=== Diameter and albedo ===
According to the survey carried out by the NEOWISE mission of NASA's Wide-field Infrared Survey Explorer, Hedera measures 13.239 kilometers in diameter and its surface has an albedo of 0.636.

The Collaborative Asteroid Lightcurve Link assumes a standard albedo for carbonaceous asteroids of 0.057 and consequently calculates a larger diameter of 44.22 kilometers based on an absolute magnitude of 10.50.
