= 1207 Ostenia =

Main-belt asteroid

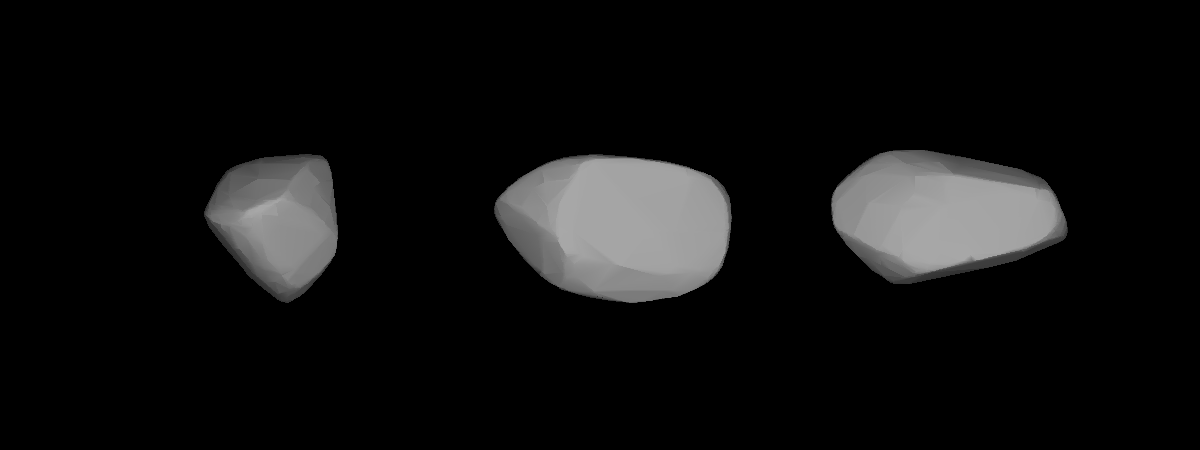
- Lightcurve-based 3D-model of Ostenia

Discovery
- Discovered by: K. Reinmuth
- Discovery site: Heidelberg Obs.
- Discovery date: 15 November 1931

Designations
- Named after: Hans Osten (amateur astronomer)
- Alternative designations: 1931 VT · 1959 EF_{1}
- Minor planet category: main-belt · Eos

Orbital characteristics
- Epoch 16 February 2017 (JD 2457800.5)
- Uncertainty parameter 0
- Observation arc: 84.41 yr (30,829 days)
- Aphelion: 3.2804 AU
- Perihelion: 2.7656 AU
- Semi-major axis: 3.0230 AU
- Eccentricity: 0.0851
- Orbital period (sidereal): 5.26 yr (1,920 days)
- Mean anomaly: 88.892°
- Mean motion: 0° 11^{m} 15^{s} / day
- Inclination: 10.363°
- Longitude of ascending node: 20.129°
- Argument of perihelion: 43.856°

Physical characteristics
- Dimensions: 21.925±0.632 km 22.93±1.3 km 23.05 km (derived)
- Synodic rotation period: 7.7 (dated)h 8.4 h (dated); 9.07129 h 9.07129±0.00005 h 9.073±0.004 h
- Geometric albedo: 0.1338±0.016; 0.1591 (derived); 0.176±0.024
- Spectral type: S (assumed)
- Absolute magnitude (H): 10.8 · 11.00

1207 Ostenia (provisional designation 1931 VT) is a stony Eoan asteroid from the outer region of the asteroid belt, approximately 23 kilometers in diameter. It was discovered on 15 November 1931, by German astronomer Karl Reinmuth at Heidelberg Observatory in southwest Germany, and named for amateur astronomer Hans Osten.

== Classification and orbit ==
The S-type asteroid is a member of the Eos family, thought to have formed from a catastrophic collision of its parent body resulting in more than 4,000 known members of the family. It orbits the Sun at a distance of 2.8–3.3 AU once every 5 years and 3 months (1,920 days). Its orbit has an eccentricity of 0.09 and an inclination of 10° with respect to the ecliptic. Ostenia's observation arc begins at Heidelberg with its official discovery observation. No precoveries were taken and no prior identifications were made.

== Diameter and albedo ==
According to the surveys carried out by the Infrared Astronomical Satellite IRAS and NASA's Wide-field Infrared Survey Explorer with its subsequent NEOWISE mission, Ostenia measures 21.925 and 22.93 kilometers in diameter, and its surface has an albedo of 0.176 and 0.1338, respectively. The Collaborative Asteroid Lightcurve Link derives an albedo of 0.1591 and a diameter of 23.05 kilometers with an absolute magnitude of 10.8.

== Lightcurves ==
In February 2006, photometric observations of Ostenia by Brian Warner at his Palmer Divide Observatory in Colorado Springs, Colorado (see § External links), were used to generate a well-defined lightcurve with a period of 9.073±0.004 hours and a variation in brightness of 0.60±0.02 magnitude (U=3). Results from modeled lightcurves in 2009 and 2011, confirmed a rotation period of 9.07 hours (U=n.a.), while previous observations from the 1970s, taken by Swedish astronomer Claes-Ingvar Lagerkvist at Mount Stromlo (Uppsala Southern Station in Australia) and Kvistaberg observatories gave a shorter period of 7.7 and 8.4 hours, respectively (U=2/2).

== Naming ==
This minor planet was named after Hans Osten (1875–1936) a German amateur astronomer, orbit computer and business man. As a non-professional, Osten attracted attention with his precise calculations of comets and asteroids. He is known for calculating the orbit of 447 Valentine, taking into account perturbations by all major planets with such precision, that it was considered exemplary in the astronomical community. Osten received the silver Leibniz Medal in 1911. Naming citation was first mentioned in The Names of the Minor Planets by Paul Herget in 1955 (H 112).
