= 1736 Floirac =

Stony Florian asteroid

Discovery
- Discovered by: G. Soulié
- Discovery site: Bordeaux Obs.
- Discovery date: 6 September 1967

Designations
- Named after: Floirac, Gironde (location of observatory)
- Alternative designations: 1967 RA · 1927 RB; 1927 SN · 1934 XC; 1937 RP · 1952 DO_{1} 1957 TC · 1957 US; 1962 CN · A914 WD
- Minor planet category: main-belt · Flora

Orbital characteristics
- Epoch 4 September 2017 (JD 2458000.5)
- Uncertainty parameter 0
- Observation arc: 89.65 yr (32,745 days)
- Aphelion: 2.6074 AU
- Perihelion: 1.8500 AU
- Semi-major axis: 2.2287 AU
- Eccentricity: 0.1699
- Orbital period (sidereal): 3.33 yr (1,215 days)
- Mean anomaly: 331.80°
- Inclination: 4.5502°
- Longitude of ascending node: 159.80°
- Argument of perihelion: 248.92°

Physical characteristics
- Dimensions: 8.617±0.075; 8.701±0.119 km 8.729 km 8.73 km (taken); 9.50±0.30 km 10.08±0.34 km
- Synodic rotation period: 6.775±0.001 h (Note: Pravec (2007) web: rotation period 6.775±0.001 hours with a brightness amplitude of 0.08 mag. Quality Code is 3. Summary figures at Collaborative Asteroid Lightcurve Link (CALL) for (1736) Floirac and Pravec, P.; Wolf, M.; Sarounova, L. (2007)) (Note: Lightcurve plot of 1736 Floirac by Higgins and Pravec, from Ondrejov data obtained by the NEO Photometric Program and collaborating projects); 12.28±0.06 h
- Geometric albedo: 0.252±0.020; 0.258±0.060; 0.2711; 0.2994±0.0420; 0.302±0.021
- Spectral type: S
- Absolute magnitude (H): 11.84±0.07 (R) · 12.20 · 12.24 · 12.33±0.086 · 12.4 · 12.44±0.33

1736 Floirac, provisional designation 1967 RA, is a stony Florian asteroid from the inner regions of the asteroid belt, approximately 8.7 kilometer in diameter.

It was discovered on 6 September 1967, by French astronomer Guy Soulié at Bordeaux Observatory in southwestern France, who named it after the French town of Floirac.

== Classification and orbit ==
Floirac is a member of the Flora family. It orbits the Sun at a distance of 1.9–2.6 AU once every 3 years and 4 months (1,215 days). Its orbit has an eccentricity of 0.17 and an inclination of 5° with respect to the ecliptic.

First observed as A914 WD at Simeiz Observatory in 1914, the body's observation arc begins with its 1927-identification as 1927 RB at Heidelberg Observatory, approximately 40 years prior to its official discovery observation at Bordeaux.

== Physical characteristics ==
This asteroid has been characterized as a stony S-type asteroid by PanSTARRS' photometric survey.

=== Lightcurves ===
In October 2007, a rotational lightcurve of Floirac was obtained from photometric observations by astronomer Petr Pravec and collaborating colleges. Lightcurve analysis gave a rotation period of 6.775 hours with a low brightness variation of 0.08 magnitude (U=3). An alternative period solution of 12.28 hours (Δmag 0.25) was found by French amateur astronomer Laurent Bernasconi in June 2006 (U=2).

=== Diameter and albedo ===
According to the surveys carried out by the Japanese Akari satellite and NASA's Wide-field Infrared Survey Explorer with its subsequent NEOWISE mission, Floirac measures between 8.617 and 10.08 kilometers in diameter and its surface has an albedo of 0.252 and 0.302.

The Collaborative Asteroid Lightcurve Link takes an albedo of 0.2711 and a diameter of 8.73 kilometers with an absolute magnitude of 12.4, based on Petr Pravec's revised WISE-data.

== Naming ==
This minor planet was named by the discoverer for Floirac, a French town in the Département Gironde, near Bordeaux, where the discovering observatory is located. The official naming citation was published by the Minor Planet Center on 15 July 1968 (M.P.C. 2883).
