= 1183 Jutta =

Main-belt asteroid

Discovery
- Discovered by: K. Reinmuth
- Discovery site: Heidelberg Obs.
- Discovery date: 22 February 1930

Designations
- Named after: unknown
- Alternative designations: 1930 DC · 1961 VB
- Minor planet category: main-belt · (inner); Nysa–Polana complex

Orbital characteristics
- Epoch 4 September 2017 (JD 2458000.5)
- Uncertainty parameter 0
- Observation arc: 86.98 yr (31,770 days)
- Aphelion: 2.6934 AU
- Perihelion: 2.0732 AU
- Semi-major axis: 2.3833 AU
- Eccentricity: 0.1301
- Orbital period (sidereal): 3.68 yr (1,344 days)
- Mean anomaly: 243.60°
- Mean motion: 0° 16^{m} 4.44^{s} / day
- Inclination: 2.8011°
- Longitude of ascending node: 15.139°
- Argument of perihelion: 205.59°

Physical characteristics
- Dimensions: 17.83 km (derived); 19.65±6.47 km 21.87±3.04 km 23.751±0.133 km 23.81±0.35 km 24.30±7.18 km 25.165±0.074 km
- Synodic rotation period: 212.5±5.0 h
- Geometric albedo: 0.03±0.02; 0.0337±0.0009; 0.039±0.032; 0.04±0.01; 0.045±0.006; 0.0609 (derived)
- Absolute magnitude (H): 12.1 · 12.30 · 12.4 · 12.43 · 12.68 · 12.95±0.23

1183 Jutta, provisional designation 1930 DC, is a slowly-rotating asteroid from the inner region of the asteroid belt, approximately 22 kilometers in diameter. It was discovered by German astronomer Karl Reinmuth at the Heidelberg Observatory on 22 February 1930. Any reference of its name to a person is unknown.

== Classification and orbit ==
Jutta orbits the Sun in the inner main asteroid belt at a distance of 2.1–2.7 AU, once every 3 years and 8 months (1,344 days). Its orbit has an eccentricity of 0.13 and an inclination of 3° with respect to the ecliptic. This asteroid is a member of the Nysa–Polana complex, a collection of overlapping asteroid families in the inner main belt. The body's observation arc begins at Heidelberg, six days after its official discovery observation.

== Physical characteristics ==
=== Slow rotator ===
In March 2011, a rotational lightcurve of Jutta was obtained from photometric observations by American astronomer Robert Stephens at his Santana Observatory (646) and Goat Mountain Astronomical Research Station (G79) in California. Lightcurve analysis gave a rotation period of 212.5±5.0 hours with a brightness amplitude of 0.10 magnitude (U=2). During the same period, French amateur astronomer Pierre Antonini obtained a provisional period of 36 hours, which is now considered incorrect.

While most asteroid have a rotation period between 2 and 20 hours, Jutta is a slow rotator, approximately among the Top 250 slowest ones known to exist. Also, no evidence of a tumbling motion has been found.

=== Diameter and albedo ===
According to the surveys carried out by the Infrared Astronomical Satellite IRAS, the Japanese Akari satellite, and NASA's Wide-field Infrared Survey Explorer with its subsequent NEOWISE mission, Jutta measures between 19.65 and 25.165 kilometers in diameter and its surface has an albedo between 0.03 and 0.045.

The Collaborative Asteroid Lightcurve Link derives a higher albedo of 0.0609 and consequently a shorter diameter of 17.83 kilometers based on an absolute magnitude of 12.4.

== Naming ==
This minor planet is named after a common German female name. Any reference of this name to a person or occurrence is unknown. The name was suggested by Gustav Stracke.

=== Unknown meaning ===
Among the many thousands of named minor planets, Jutta is one of 120 asteroids, for which no official naming citation has been published. All of these low-numbered asteroids have numbers between 164 Eva and 1514 Ricouxa and were discovered between 1876 and the 1930s, predominantly by astronomers Auguste Charlois, Johann Palisa, Max Wolf and Karl Reinmuth.
