= 1257 Móra =

Main-belt asteroid

Discovery
- Discovered by: K. Reinmuth
- Discovery site: Heidelberg Obs.
- Discovery date: 8 August 1932

Designations
- Named after: Kráoly Móra (Hungarian astronomer)
- Alternative designations: 1932 PE · 1928 QA; 1935 KL · 1964 VO; 1964 WA
- Minor planet category: main-belt · (inner)

Orbital characteristics
- Epoch 4 September 2017 (JD 2458000.5)
- Uncertainty parameter 0
- Observation arc: 88.80 yr (32,434 days)
- Aphelion: 2.6962 AU
- Perihelion: 2.2815 AU
- Semi-major axis: 2.4888 AU
- Eccentricity: 0.0833
- Orbital period (sidereal): 3.93 yr (1,434 days)
- Mean anomaly: 335.03°
- Mean motion: 0° 15^{m} 3.6^{s} / day
- Inclination: 3.9231°
- Longitude of ascending node: 213.94°
- Argument of perihelion: 18.983°

Physical characteristics
- Dimensions: 10.79 km (derived); 14.72±4.32 km 17.05±6.10 km 21.392±1.126 km 21.47±0.64 km
- Synodic rotation period: 5.28 h 5.2948±0.0004 h 5.3±0.1 h
- Geometric albedo: 0.051±0.007; 0.08±0.07; 0.096±0.007; 0.10±0.07; 0.20 (assumed)
- Spectral type: C · S B–V = 0.630; U–B = 0.320
- Absolute magnitude (H): 11.50 · 12.00 · 12.09 · 12.1 · 12.2

1257 Móra, provisional designation 1932 PE, is an asteroid from the inner regions of the asteroid belt, approximately 15 kilometers in diameter. It was discovered on 8 August 1932, by German astronomer Karl Reinmuth at Heidelberg Observatory in southwest Germany. The asteroid was named after Hungarian astronomer Károly Móra.

== Orbit and classification ==
Móra orbits the Sun in the inner main-belt at a distance of 2.3–2.7 AU once every 3 years and 11 months (1,434 days). Its orbit has an eccentricity of 0.08 and an inclination of 4° with respect to the ecliptic. Identified as 1928 QA, it was first observed at Heidelberg and Algiers Observatory in 1928, extending the body's observation arc by 4 years prior to its official discovery observation.

== Physical characteristics ==
=== Rotation period ===
American astronomer Richard Binzel and French amateur astronomer René Roy obtained three rotational light curves of Móra from photometric observation taken in 1983 and 2009/11, respectively. Light curve analysis gave a well-defined rotation period between 2.28 and 2.30 hours with a change in brightness of 0.23 to 0.43 magnitude (U=3/2+/3). The short period is just above the threshold of 2.2 hours for the so-called fast rotators.

=== Diameter, albedo and spectral type ===
According to the space-based surveys carried out by the Japanese Akari satellite and NASA's Wide-field Infrared Survey Explorer with its subsequent NEOWISE mission, Móra measures between 14.72 and 21.47 kilometers in diameter and its surface has an albedo between 0.051 and 0.10.

The Collaborative Asteroid Lightcurve Link assumes a standard albedo for stony S-type asteroids of 0.20 and derives a shorter diameter of 10.79 kilometers, while Richard Binzel classified it as a carbonaceous C-type asteroid during his photometric observations in the 1980s.

== Naming ==
This minor planet was named in honour of Hungarian astronomer Károly Móra (1899–1938). The official naming citation was mentioned in The Names of the Minor Planets by Paul Herget in 1955 (H 116). As a curiosity, astronomer Paul Wild reshuffled the letters and numbers of the designation "1257 Mora" to construct a name for his discovery 2517 Orma in 1968 (orma also means "trace, track" in Italian).
