= 1175 Margo =

Stony background asteroid

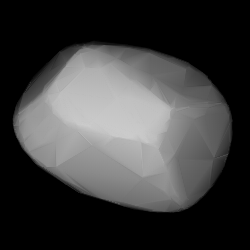
- Modelled shape of Margo from its lightcurve

Discovery
- Discovered by: K. Reinmuth
- Discovery site: Heidelberg Obs.
- Discovery date: 17 October 1930

Designations
- Named after: unknown
- Alternative designations: 1930 UD · 1953 VK; 1957 KU · A907 VA
- Minor planet category: main-belt · (outer) background

Orbital characteristics
- Epoch 4 September 2017 (JD 2458000.5)
- Uncertainty parameter 0
- Observation arc: 109.91 yr (40,146 days)
- Aphelion: 3.4345 AU
- Perihelion: 2.9979 AU
- Semi-major axis: 3.2162 AU
- Eccentricity: 0.0679
- Orbital period (sidereal): 5.77 yr (2,107 days)
- Mean anomaly: 61.257°
- Mean motion: 0° 10^{m} 15.24^{s} / day
- Inclination: 16.307°
- Longitude of ascending node: 237.19°
- Argument of perihelion: 102.79°

Physical characteristics
- Dimensions: 22.99±0.85 km 24.266±0.276 km 25.394±0.250 km 58.29 km (calculated)
- Synodic rotation period: 6.01±0.02 h 6.01±0.03 h 6.0136±0.0002 h 6.01375±0.00005 h 6.015±0.001 h 6.017±0.001 h 11.99±0.03 h
- Geometric albedo: 0.057 (assumed); 0.2409±0.0329; 0.249±0.042; 0.302±0.026
- Spectral type: S · C (assumed)
- Absolute magnitude (H): 9.9 · 10.0 · 10.06±0.23 · 10.20

1175 Margo, provisional designation 1930 UD, is a stony background asteroid from the outermost regions of the asteroid belt, approximately 24 kilometers in diameter. It was discovered on 17 October 1930, by astronomer Karl Reinmuth at the Heidelberg-Königstuhl State Observatory in southwest Germany. The meaning of the asteroids's name is unknown.

== Orbit and classification ==
Margo is a non-family asteroid from the main belt's background population. It orbits the Sun in the outermost asteroid belt at a distance of 3.0–3.4 AU once every 5 years and 9 months (2,107 days; semi-major axis of 3.22 AU). Its orbit has an eccentricity of 0.07 and an inclination of 16° with respect to the ecliptic.

The body's observation arc begins with its first identification as A907 VA at Heidelberg in November 1907, almost 23 years prior to its official discovery observation.

== Physical characteristics ==
Margo has been characterized as a stony S-type asteroid by Pan-STARRS photometric survey. Conversely, the Collaborative Asteroid Lightcurve Link (CALL) assumes it to be a carbonaceous C-type.

=== Rotation period and poles ===
In November 2005, a rotational lightcurve of Margo was obtained from photometric observations by astronomers Raymond Poncy (177), Gino Farroni, Pierre Antonini, Donn Starkey (H63) and Raoul Behrend. Lightcurve analysis gave a well-defined rotation period of 6.0136 hours with a brightness amplitude of 0.31 magnitude (U=3). Since then, several other, lower-rated lightcurves have been published (U=3-/2+/2+/2/2).

In 2016, the asteroid lightcurve has also been modeled using photometric data from various sources. It gave a concurring period of 6.01375 hours and two spin axis in ecliptic coordinates of (184.0°, −43.0°) and (353.0°, −17.0°).

=== Diameter and albedo ===
According to the surveys carried out by the Japanese Akari satellite and the NEOWISE mission of NASA's Wide-field Infrared Survey Explorer, Margo measures between 22.99 and 25.394 kilometers in diameter and its surface has an albedo between 0.2409 and 0.302. CALL assumes a standard albedo for carbonaceous asteroids of 0.057 and consequently calculates a much larger diameter of 58.29 kilometers based on an absolute magnitude of 9.9.

== Naming ==
This minor planet was named by the discoverer Karl Reinmuth. Any reference of its name to a person or occurrence is unknown.

=== Unknown meaning ===
Among the many thousands of named minor planets, Margo is one of 120 asteroids, for which no official naming citation has been published. All of these low-numbered asteroids have numbers between 164 Eva and 1514 Ricouxa and were discovered between 1876 and the 1930s, predominantly by astronomers Auguste Charlois, Johann Palisa, Max Wolf and Karl Reinmuth.
