= 1081 Reseda =

Dark background asteroid

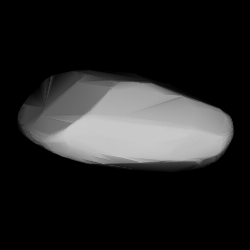
- Modelled shape of Reseda from its lightcurve

Discovery
- Discovered by: K. Reinmuth
- Discovery site: Heidelberg Obs.
- Discovery date: 31 August 1927

Designations
- Pronunciation: /rɪˈsiːdə/
- Named after: Resēda (mignonette) (herbaceous plant)
- Alternative designations: 1927 QF · 1949 UA_{1} 1975 LS
- Minor planet category: main-belt · (outer); background

Orbital characteristics
- Epoch 4 September 2017 (JD 2458000.5)
- Uncertainty parameter 0
- Observation arc: 89.85 yr (32,816 days)
- Aphelion: 3.5567 AU
- Perihelion: 2.6505 AU
- Semi-major axis: 3.1036 AU
- Eccentricity: 0.1460
- Orbital period (sidereal): 5.47 yr (1,997 days)
- Mean anomaly: 167.25°
- Mean motion: 0° 10^{m} 49.08^{s} / day
- Inclination: 4.2029°
- Longitude of ascending node: 30.443°
- Argument of perihelion: 7.5205°

Physical characteristics
- Dimensions: 31.60±11.05 km 35.66±0.70 km 37.03±8.13 km 37.810±0.219 km 37.89±0.46 km 37.97 km (derived); 40.462±0.470 km
- Synodic rotation period: 7.3002±0.0006 h 7.30136±0.00001 h
- Pole ecliptic latitude: (92.0°, −69.0°) (λ_{1}/β_{1}); (256.0°, −76.0°) (λ_{2}/β_{2})
- Geometric albedo: 0.0326±0.0026; 0.042±0.002; 0.043±0.006; 0.0488 (derived); 0.049±0.008; 0.06±0.02; 0.09±0.07
- Spectral type: C (assumed)
- Absolute magnitude (H): 11.00 · 11.1 · 11.16 · 11.30

1081 Reseda (prov. designation: 1927 QF) is a dark background asteroid from the outer regions of the asteroid belt. It was discovered on 31 August 1927, by astronomer Karl Reinmuth at the Heidelberg-Königstuhl State Observatory in southwest Germany. The asteroid has a rotation period of 7.3 hours and measures approximately 37 kilometers (23 miles) in diameter. It was named after the herbaceous plant Reseda.

== Orbit and classification ==
Reseda is a non-family asteroid of the main belt's background population when applying the hierarchical clustering method to its proper orbital elements. It orbits the Sun in the outer asteroid belt at a distance of 2.7–3.6 AU once every 5 years and 6 months (1,997 days; semi-major axis of 3.10 AU). Its orbit has an eccentricity of 0.15 and an inclination of 4° with respect to the ecliptic. The body's observation arc begins at Heidelberg in September 1927, or 26 days after its official discovery observation.

== Naming ==
This minor planet was named after the herbaceous plant Reseda (also known as "weld", "dyer's rocket" and "bastard rocket") a genus of Old World herbs of the mignonette family. The official naming citation was mentioned in The Names of the Minor Planets by Paul Herget in 1955 (H 102).

=== Reinmuth's flowers ===
Due to his many discoveries, Karl Reinmuth submitted a large list of 66 newly named asteroids in the early 1930s. The list covered his discoveries with numbers between (1009) and (1200). This list also contained a sequence of 28 asteroids, starting with 1054 Forsytia, that were all named after plants, in particular flowering plants (also see list of minor planets named after animals and plants).

== Physical characteristics ==
Reseda is an assumed carbonaceous C-type asteroid.

=== Rotation period ===
In August 2008, a rotational lightcurve of Reseda was obtained from photometric observations. Lightcurve analysis gave a well-defined rotation period of 7.3002 hours with a brightness amplitude of 0.34 magnitude (U=3).

=== Poles ===
A 2016-published lightcurve, using modeled photometric data from the Lowell Photometric Database, gave a concurring period of 7.30136 hours, as well as two spin axis of (92.0°, −69.0°) and (256.0°, −76.0°) in ecliptic coordinates (λ, β).

=== Diameter and albedo ===
According to the surveys carried out by the Japanese Akari satellite and the NEOWISE mission of NASA's Wide-field Infrared Survey Explorer, Reseda measures between 31.60 and 40.462 kilometers in diameter and its surface has an albedo between 0.0326 and 0.09. The Collaborative Asteroid Lightcurve Link derives an albedo of 0.0488 and a diameter of 37.97 kilometers based on an absolute magnitude of 11.0.
