= 1141 Bohmia =

Asteroid

Discovery
- Discovered by: M. F. Wolf
- Discovery site: Heidelberg Obs.
- Discovery date: 4 January 1930

Designations
- Named after: Katharina Bohm-Waltz (German philanthropist)
- Alternative designations: 1930 AA · 1949 SU
- Minor planet category: main-belt · (inner); Flora

Orbital characteristics
- Epoch 4 September 2017 (JD 2458000.5)
- Uncertainty parameter 0
- Observation arc: 87.83 yr (32,079 days)
- Aphelion: 2.6457 AU
- Perihelion: 1.8946 AU
- Semi-major axis: 2.2701 AU
- Eccentricity: 0.1654
- Orbital period (sidereal): 3.42 yr (1,249 days)
- Mean anomaly: 284.92°
- Mean motion: 0° 17^{m} 17.52^{s} / day
- Inclination: 4.2753°
- Longitude of ascending node: 105.52°
- Argument of perihelion: 276.18°

Physical characteristics
- Dimensions: 5.642±0.241 km
- Geometric albedo: 0.251±0.060
- Absolute magnitude (H): 13.4

1141 Bohmia, provisional designation 1930 AA, is a Florian asteroid from the inner regions of the asteroid belt, approximately 6 kilometers in diameter. It was discovered by German astronomer Max Wolf at the Heidelberg-Königstuhl State Observatory on 4 January 1930. The asteroid was named after German philanthropist Katharina Bohm-Waltz.

== Orbit and classification ==
Bohmia is a member of the Flora family (402), a giant asteroid family and the largest family of stony asteroids in the main-belt. It orbits the Sun in the inner asteroid belt at a distance of 1.9–2.6 AU once every 3 years and 5 months (1,249 days; semi-major axis 2.27 AU). Its orbit has an eccentricity of 0.17 and an inclination of 4° with respect to the ecliptic. The body's observation arc begins with its official discovery observation at Heidelberg in January 1930.

== Physical characteristics ==
Bohmia's spectral type is unknown. However, its albedo is similar to that of the Flora family's parent body, 8 Flora, which is a stony S-type asteroid.

=== Diameter and albedo ===
According to the survey carried out by the NEOWISE mission of NASA's Wide-field Infrared Survey Explorer, Bohmia measures 5.642 kilometers in diameter and its surface has an albedo of 0.251.

=== Rotation period ===
No rotational lightcurve of Bohmia has been obtained from photometric observations. The asteroid's rotation period, poles and shape remain unknown.

== Naming ==
This minor planet was named after Katharina Bohm-Waltz (died 1901), a German philanthropist who donated a 0.72-meter reflecting telescope (named Waltz reflector) to the discovering Heidelberg Observatory. The official naming citation was mentioned in The Names of the Minor Planets by Paul Herget in 1955 (H 107).
