= 1180 Rita =

Main-belt asteroid

Discovery
- Discovered by: K. Reinmuth
- Discovery site: Heidelberg Obs.
- Discovery date: 9 April 1931

Designations
- Named after: unknown
- Alternative designations: 1931 GE · 1929 CM; 1953 AH · 1957 UF_{1} A907 GG · A908 KA; A916 LA
- Minor planet category: main-belt · (outer) · Hilda

Orbital characteristics
- Epoch 16 February 2017 (JD 2457800.5)
- Uncertainty parameter 0
- Observation arc: 109.98 yr (40,172 days)
- Aphelion: 4.6127 AU
- Perihelion: 3.3574 AU
- Semi-major axis: 3.9851 AU
- Eccentricity: 0.1575
- Orbital period (sidereal): 7.96 yr (2,906 days)
- Mean anomaly: 209.15°
- Mean motion: 0° 7^{m} 26.04^{s} / day
- Inclination: 7.1985°
- Longitude of ascending node: 88.336°
- Argument of perihelion: 209.12°
- Jupiter MOID: 0.6111 AU

Physical characteristics
- Mean diameter: 82.72 km (calculated); 97 km 97.63±2.30 km
- Synodic rotation period: 9 h 9.605±0.006 h 12 h 13.090±0.002 h (Note: Warner (2017) web: lightcurve plot of 1180 Rita – rotation period 13.090±0.002 hours with a brightness amplitude of 0.06±0.01 magnitude. No quality code of 2. Observed between 12 December 2016 and 26 January 2017, with a total of 304 data points. Summary figures at the Light Curve Data Base.); 14.72 h 14.902 h 20.496±0.005 h (Note: Slyusarev (2012) web: rotation period 20.496±0.005 hours with a brightness amplitude of 0.05 magnitude. No quality code determined. Color Indices for BV and VR are 0.670±0.010 and 0.440±0.010, respectively. Summary figures at the Light Curve Data Base.)
- Geometric albedo: 0.041±0.002; 0.044±0.008; 0.048; 0.057 (assumed); 0.058±0.009
- Spectral type: Tholen = P · P B–V = 0.682 · 0.670±0.010; U–B = 0.216; V–R = 0.440±0.010
- Absolute magnitude (H): 9.14 · 9.17±0.19

1180 Rita, provisional designation 1931 GE, is a dark and spheroidal Hildian asteroid from the outermost regions of the asteroid belt, approximately 97 kilometers in diameter. It was discovered on 9 April 1931, by German astronomer Karl Reinmuth at the Heidelberg Observatory in southwest Germany. Any reference of its later name, Rita, is unknown.

== Orbit and classification ==
Rita belongs to the orbital Hilda group which is located in the outermost part of the main-belt. Asteroids in this dynamical group have semi-major axis between 3.7 and 4.2 AU and stay in a 3:2 resonance with the gas giant Jupiter. Rita, however, is a background asteroid and not a member of the (collisional) Hilda family (101). Hildian asteroids are thought to have originated from the Kuiper belt.

The asteroid orbits the Sun at a distance of 3.4–4.6 AU once every 7 years and 12 months (2,906 days). Its orbit has an eccentricity of 0.16 and an inclination of 7° with respect to the ecliptic.

It was first observed as A907 GG at Heidelberg in 1907. The body's observation arc begins at Heidelberg in 1908, when it was identified as A908 KA, approximately 23 years prior to its official discovery observation.

== Physical characteristics ==
In the Tholen taxonomy, Rita is a dark and reddish P-type asteroid. The P-type asteroids are some of the darkest objects in the Solar System.

=== Rotation period ===
Since 1983, several rotational lightcurves of Rita have been obtained from photometric observations. Lightcurve analysis gave a wide range of divergent rotation periods between 9 and 20.5 hours. The Light Curve Data Base adopts a period of 13.090 hours with a brightness amplitude of 0.06 magnitude. Bodies with such a low brightness variation are typically of a spherical rather than elongated shape. The lightcurve was obtained in January 2017, by American astronomer Brian Warner at the Center for Solar System Studies in California (U=2).

=== Diameter and albedo ===
According to the surveys carried out by the Japanese Akari satellite, and NASA's Wide-field Infrared Survey Explorer with its subsequent NEOWISE mission, Rita measures 97 kilometers in diameter and its surface has an albedo between 0.041 and 0.058. The Collaborative Asteroid Lightcurve Link assumes a standard albedo for carbonaceous, outer main-belt asteroids of 0.057, and calculates a diameter of 82.72 kilometers with on an absolute magnitude of 9.14.

== Naming ==
Any reference of this minor planet's name to a person or occurrence is unknown.

=== Unknown meaning ===
Among the many thousands of named minor planets, Rita is one of 120 asteroids, for which no official naming citation has been published. All of these low-numbered asteroids have numbers between 164 Eva and 1514 Ricouxa and were discovered between 1876 and the 1930s, predominantly by astronomers Auguste Charlois, Johann Palisa, Max Wolf and Karl Reinmuth.
