= 1628 Strobel =

Main-belt asteroid

Discovery
- Discovered by: K. Reinmuth
- Discovery site: Heidelberg Obs.
- Discovery date: 11 September 1923

Designations
- Named after: Willi Strobel (astronomer)
- Alternative designations: 1923 OG · 1926 GY; 1947 GC · 1949 QA_{2} 1952 DV_{2} · 1957 CA; 1960 WH
- Minor planet category: main-belt · (outer)

Orbital characteristics
- Epoch 4 September 2017 (JD 2458000.5)
- Uncertainty parameter 0
- Observation arc: 93.11 yr (34,007 days)
- Aphelion: 3.2152 AU
- Perihelion: 2.8088 AU
- Semi-major axis: 3.0120 AU
- Eccentricity: 0.0675
- Orbital period (sidereal): 5.23 yr (1,909 days)
- Mean anomaly: 244.38°
- Mean motion: 0° 11^{m} 18.6^{s} / day
- Inclination: 19.387°
- Longitude of ascending node: 181.19°
- Argument of perihelion: 289.14°

Physical characteristics
- Dimensions: 51.15±14.91 km 53.147±0.793 km 54.26±16.39 km 56.58±0.68 km 57.06 km (derived); 57.12±1.7 km (IRAS:12); 59.345±0.484 km
- Synodic rotation period: 9.52±0.01 h 11.80 h
- Geometric albedo: 0.047±0.010; 0.05±0.03; 0.0504 (derived); 0.0532±0.003 (IRAS:12); 0.055±0.002; 0.0581±0.0113; 0.06±0.04
- Spectral type: P · X · C B–V = 0.840; U–B = 0.320
- Absolute magnitude (H): 10.02 · 10.08 · 10.31±0.20 · 10.32

1628 Strobel (provisional designation 1923 OG) is a carbonaceous asteroid from the outer region of the asteroid belt, approximately 55 kilometers in diameter.

It was discovered on 11 September 1923, by German astronomer Karl Reinmuth at Heidelberg Observatory in southern Germany, and named after ARI-astronomer Willi Strobel.

== Classification and orbit ==
Strobel orbits the Sun in the outer main-belt at a distance of 2.8–3.2 AU once every 5 years and 3 months (1,909 days). Its orbit has an eccentricity of 0.07 and an inclination of 19° with respect to the ecliptic. Strobel's observation arc begins two nights after its official discovery observation at Heidelberg in 1923.

== Physical characteristics ==
Strobel is a carbonaceous C-type asteroid. It is also classified as a P-type by WISE and as an X-type asteroid by Pan-STARRS.

=== Rotation period ===
American astronomer Richard Binzel obtained the first rotational lightcurve of Strobel in May 1984. It gave a rotation period of 11.80 hours with a brightness amplitude of 0.22 magnitude (U=2). In May 2005, photometric observations by French amateur astronomer Laurent Bernasconi gave a shorter period of 9.52 hours and a brightness change of 0.20 magnitude (U=2).

=== Diameter and albedo ===
According to the surveys carried out by the Infrared Astronomical Satellite IRAS, the Japanese Akari satellite, and NASA's Wide-field Infrared Survey Explorer with its subsequent NEOWISE mission, Strobel measures between 51.15 and 59.35 kilometers in diameter, and its surface has an albedo between 0.047 and 0.06. The Collaborative Asteroid Lightcurve Link derives an albedo of 0.0504 and a diameter of 57.06 kilometers with an absolute magnitude of 10.08.

== Naming ==
This minor planet was named in honor of Willi Strobel (1909–1988), staff member at Astronomisches Rechen-Institut (ARI) since 1938, and author of the 1963-edition of Identifizierungsnachweis der Kleinen Planeten (Minor planet identifications, published by ARI). The official naming citation was published by the Minor Planet Center on 20 February 1976 (M.P.C. 3931).
