= Wiesław Z. Wiśniewski =

Polish astronomer

Wiesław Z. Wiśniewski (May 2, 1931 in Poland – February 28, 1994 in Tucson, Arizona, United States) was a Polish astronomer. Wisniewski was born and educated in Poland. He survived the Nazi occupation and many of his later insights and viewpoints may have grown from the hardships suffered during the war and the years afterwards. He joined the staff of the Cracow Observatory at Jagiellonian University as a research assistant in 1953. From 1957 to 1959, he participated as a Scientist of the International Geophysical Year Expedition to Spitsbergen. Wisniewski moved to the United States in 1963 to work as an astronomy professor at the newly founded Lunar and Planetary Laboratory at the University of Arizona in Tucson Arizona. Wisniewski returned to Poland in 1967, but eventually made his permanent home in Tucson, Arizona in 1971.

His main interests were comets and asteroids. Wisniewski was heavily involved in astronomical photometry which he learned while working with Harold Johnson at the Lunar and Planetary Laboratory. His later years were occupied with observations of asteroids and comets, especially of the light-curves of small asteroids as well as taxonomic measurements of asteroids. At the time of his death, he was actively planning to participate in a network of telescopes to observe the impacts of comet Shoemaker-Levy 9 on Jupiter. He had obtained one of the early high resolution images of the comet on March 28, 1993 while using the Steward Observatory 90 inch telescope.

== See also ==
- 2256 Wiśniewski, an asteroid named in his honour
