= Comet Kohoutek (disambiguation) =

Comet Kohoutek most commonly refers to C/1973 E1 (Kohoutek). It may also refer to other comets discovered by Czech astronomer, Luboš Kohoutek, including:

- 75D/Kohoutek
- 76P/West–Kohoutek–Ikemura
- C/1969 O1 (Kohoutek)
- C/1973 D1 (Kohoutek)
