= 1850 Kohoutek =

Stony main-belt asteroid

Discovery
- Discovered by: K. Reinmuth
- Discovery site: Heidelberg Obs.
- Discovery date: 23 March 1942

Designations
- Named after: Luboš Kohoutek (astronomer)
- Alternative designations: 1942 EN · 1949 KD; 1953 SH · 1959 GR; 1965 AQ
- Minor planet category: main-belt · Flora

Orbital characteristics
- Epoch 4 September 2017 (JD 2458000.5)
- Uncertainty parameter 0
- Observation arc: 75.20 yr (27,468 days)
- Aphelion: 2.5338 AU
- Perihelion: 1.9679 AU
- Semi-major axis: 2.2508 AU
- Eccentricity: 0.1257
- Orbital period (sidereal): 3.38 yr (1,233 days)
- Mean anomaly: 63.537°
- Mean motion: 0° 17^{m} 30.84^{s} / day
- Inclination: 4.0510°
- Longitude of ascending node: 68.923°
- Argument of perihelion: 190.65°

Physical characteristics
- Dimensions: 5.91±0.24 km 6.05 km (calculated); 7.642±0.086 km
- Synodic rotation period: 3.68±0.01 h
- Geometric albedo: 0.181±0.018; 0.24 (assumed); 0.383±0.127
- Spectral type: S
- Absolute magnitude (H): 12.8 · 12.81±0.09 (R) · 12.9 · 13.26

1850 Kohoutek, provisional designation 1942 EN, is a stony Florian asteroid from the inner regions of the asteroid belt, approximately 6 kilometers in diameter. It was named after Czech astronomer Luboš Kohoutek.

== Discovery ==
Kohoutek was discovered during World War II on 23 March 1942, by German astronomer Karl Reinmuth at Heidelberg Observatory in southwest Germany, Ten days prior to its discovery, the body was observed at Turku Observatory, Finland. However, these observations are not considered for the asteroid's orbital computation and its observation arc begins with the discovery observation at Heidelberg.

Since the discovery was made in the second half of March, the letter "E" in the provisional designation is erroneous. It should have been "F", but the initially incorrect assignment has persisted.

== Classification and orbit ==
It is a member of the Flora family, one of the largest families of stony asteroids in the asteroid belt. It orbits the Sun in the inner main-belt at a distance of 2.0–2.5 AU once every 3 years and 5 months (1,233 days). Its orbit has an eccentricity of 0.13 and an inclination of 4° with respect to the ecliptic.

== Physical parameters ==
=== Rotation period ===
In December 2014, a rotational lightcurve of Kohoutek was obtained from photometric observations in the R-band at the Palomar Transient Factory in California. Lightcurve analysis gave a rotation period of 3.68 hours with a brightness variation of 0.31 magnitude (U=2).

=== Diameter and albedo ===
According to the survey carried out by NASA's Wide-field Infrared Survey Explorer with its subsequent NEOWISE mission, Kohoutek measures 5.91 and 7.64 kilometers in diameter, and its surface has an albedo of 0.181 and 0.383, respectively. The Collaborative Asteroid Lightcurve Link assumes an albedo of 0.24 – derived from 8 Flora, a S-type asteroid and the family's largest member and namesake – and calculates a diameter of 6.05 kilometers with an absolute magnitude of 13.26.

== Naming ==
This minor planet was named in honor of the Czech astronomer, Luboš Kohoutek (born 1935), former staff member of the Hamburg-Bergedorf Observatory and prolific observer and discoverer of minor planets and comets, most notably 75D/Kohoutek, 76P/West–Kohoutek–Ikemura, and the long-period Comet Kohoutek. He has also contributed in the fields of planetary nebulae and emission-line stars. The official naming citation was published by the Minor Planet Center on 20 February 1976 (M.P.C. 3935).
