= 1865 Cerberus =

Stony near-Earth asteroid

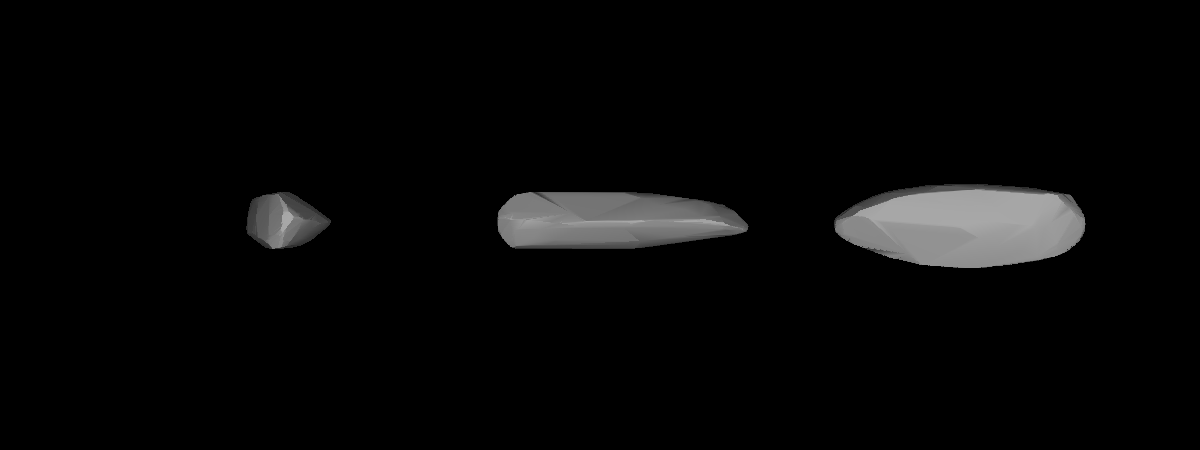
- Lightcurve-based 3D-model of Cerberus

Discovery
- Discovered by: L. Kohoutek
- Discovery site: Bergedorf Obs.
- Discovery date: 26 October 1971

Designations
- Pronunciation: /ˈsɜːrbərəs/
- Named after: Cerberus (Greek mythology)
- Alternative designations: 1971 UA
- Minor planet category: NEO · Apollo
- Adjectives: Cerberean, -ian /sɜːrˈbɪəriən/

Orbital characteristics
- Epoch 4 September 2017 (JD 2458000.5)
- Uncertainty parameter 0
- Observation arc: 45.05 yr (16,456 days)
- Aphelion: 1.5844 AU
- Perihelion: 0.5757 AU
- Semi-major axis: 1.0801 AU
- Eccentricity: 0.4669
- Orbital period (sidereal): 1.12 yr (410 days)
- Mean anomaly: 205.19°
- Mean motion: 0° 52^{m} 41.16^{s} / day
- Inclination: 16.095°
- Longitude of ascending node: 212.93°
- Argument of perihelion: 325.26°
- Earth MOID: 0.1567 AU · 61 LD

Physical characteristics
- Mean diameter: 1.2 ± 0.1 km 1.2 ± 0.0 km
- Synodic rotation period: 6.80329 h
- Pole ecliptic longitude: 306°
- Pole ecliptic latitude: −77°
- Geometric albedo: 0.155+0.001 −0.002; 0.281+0.036 −0.034; 0.1118; 0.136±0.021; 0.50±0.29
- Temperature: 250 ± 15 K
- Spectral type: S (Tholen) · S (SMASS); S B–V = 0.790; U–B = 0.442
- Absolute magnitude (H): 16.45±0.07 (R); 16.84; 16.965±0.04; 16.97±0.04; 16.97±0.13

1865 Cerberus is a stony asteroid and near-Earth object of the Apollo group, approximately 1.6 kilometers in diameter. It was discovered on 26 October 1971, by Czech astronomer Luboš Kohoutek at the Hamburger Bergedorf Observatory, Germany, and given the provisional designation 1971 UA. It was named for Cerberus from Greek mythology.

== Orbit and classification ==
Cerberus orbits the Sun at a distance of 0.6–1.6 AU once every 1 years and 1 month (410 days). Its orbit has an eccentricity of 0.47 and an inclination of 16° with respect to the ecliptic.

The Apollo asteroid has an Earth minimum orbital intersection distance of 0.1567 AU (23,400,000 km), which corresponds to 61 lunar distances. It passes within 30 million km of the Earth seven times from the year 1900 to the year 2100, each time at a distance of 24.4 to 25.7 million km. It also makes close approaches to Mars and Venus.

== Physical characteristics ==
In the Tholen and SMASS taxonomy, Cerberus is a common stony S-type asteroid, composed of 65% plagioclase and 35% pyroxene. It has a rotation period of 6.804 hours and a geometric albedo of 0.220. With a maximum lightcurve range of 2.3, (Note: Detail: "Pravec2008web" at LCDB Data for (1865) Cerberus) Cerberus may be cigar shaped like 1I/ʻOumuamua.

== Naming ==
This minor planet is named after the figure from Greek mythology, Cerberus, a three-headed dog that guarded the entrance to Hades, the Underworld. His capture marked the last of the twelve labors of Hercules. It is also the name of an extinct constellation, Cerberus, now contained in the eastern part of Hercules. (It should not be confused with Kerberos, a moon of the dwarf planet Pluto.) The official naming citation was published by the Minor Planet Center on 20 December 1974 (M.P.C. 3758).
