= 2055 Dvořák =

Eccentric Mars-crossing asteroid

Discovery
- Discovered by: L. Kohoutek
- Discovery site: Bergedorf Obs.
- Discovery date: 19 February 1974

Designations
- Pronunciation: /d(ə)ˈvɔːrʒɑːk, -ʒæk/ d(ə)-VOR-zha(h)k
- Named after: Antonín Dvořák (Czech composer)
- Alternative designations: 1974 DB
- Minor planet category: Mars-crosser

Orbital characteristics
- Epoch 4 September 2017 (JD 2458000.5)
- Uncertainty parameter 0
- Observation arc: 42.37 yr (15,475 days)
- Aphelion: 3.0297 AU
- Perihelion: 1.5909 AU
- Semi-major axis: 2.3103 AU
- Eccentricity: 0.3114
- Orbital period (sidereal): 3.51 yr (1,283 days)
- Mean anomaly: 101.49°
- Mean motion: 0° 16^{m} 50.52^{s} / day
- Inclination: 21.488°
- Longitude of ascending node: 340.44°
- Argument of perihelion: 244.12°

Physical characteristics
- Dimensions: 8.18 km (calculated)
- Synodic rotation period: 4.405±0.001 h 4.4106±0.0001 h
- Geometric albedo: 0.20 (assumed)
- Spectral type: S
- Absolute magnitude (H): 12.8 · 12.81±0.05 · 13.27±0.65

2055 Dvořák, provisional designation 1974 DB, is an eccentric asteroid and sizable Mars-crosser from the innermost regions of the asteroid belt, approximately 8 kilometers in diameter. It was discovered on 19 February 1974, by Czech astronomer Luboš Kohoutek at the Bergedorf Observatory in Hamburg, Germany. It was named after Czech composer Antonín Dvořák.

== Classification and orbit ==
Dvořák is a Mars-crossing asteroid, as it crosses the orbit of Mars at 1.666 AU. It orbits the Sun at a distance of 1.6–3.0 AU once every 3 years and 6 months (1,283 days). Its orbit has an eccentricity of 0.31 and an inclination of 21° with respect to the ecliptic. The body's observation arc begins with its official discovery observation at Bergedorf in 1974.

== Physical characteristics ==
=== Lightcurves ===
In July 2013, two rotational lightcurves of Dvořák were obtained from photometric observations by Julian Oey at the Blue Mountain Observatory (Q68), Australia, and by a collaboration of astronomers in Argentina. Lightcurve analysis gave a concurring rotation period of 4.405 and 4.4106 hours, respectively, both with a brightness variation of 0.17 magnitude (U=3-/3-).

=== Diameter and albedo estimates ===
The Collaborative Asteroid Lightcurve Link assumes a standard albedo for stony asteroids of 0.20 and calculates a diameter of 8.18 kilometers based on an absolute magnitude of 12.8. Dvořák has not been surveyed by any of the space-based telescopes such as IRAS, Akari and WISE.

== Naming ==
This minor planet was named after Czech composer Antonin Dvořák (1841–1904), one of the worldwide known Czech composers along with Bedřich Smetana. The official naming citation was published by the Minor Planet Center on 1 July 1979 (M.P.C. 4786).
