= 2047 Smetana =

Hungaria asteroid and synchronous binary system

Discovery
- Discovered by: L. Kohoutek
- Discovery site: Bergedorf Obs.
- Discovery date: 26 October 1971

Designations
- Pronunciation: /ˈsmɛtənə/
- Named after: Bedřich Smetana (Czech composer)
- Alternative designations: 1971 UA1
- Minor planet category: main-belt · (inner) · Hungaria

Orbital characteristics
- Epoch 4 September 2017 (JD 2458000.5)
- Uncertainty parameter 0
- Observation arc: 44.77 yr (16,353 days)
- Aphelion: 1.8783 AU
- Perihelion: 1.8658 AU
- Semi-major axis: 1.8720 AU
- Eccentricity: 0.0033
- Orbital period (sidereal): 2.56 yr (936 days)
- Mean anomaly: 16.211°
- Mean motion: 0° 23^{m} 5.28^{s} / day
- Inclination: 25.281°
- Longitude of ascending node: 36.611°
- Argument of perihelion: 307.99°
- Known satellites: 1

Physical characteristics
- Dimensions: 3.131±0.153 km 3.85 km (calculated)
- Synodic rotation period: 2.4801±0.0005 h (Note: Warner (2006/11/12): Lightcurve plots of (2047) Smetana from 2006, 2011 and 2012 (two plots) by Brian Warner at the PDO and PDS. Summary figures at Collaborative Asteroid Lightcurve Link (CALL)); 2.4969±0.0004 h 2.4970±0.0003 h 2.498±0.001 h
- Geometric albedo: 0.3 (assumed); 0.544±0.069
- Spectral type: E
- Absolute magnitude (H): 13.80 · 14.0 · 14.25±0.05

2047 Smetana, provisional designation 1971 UA_{1}, is a bright Hungaria asteroid and synchronous binary system from the innermost regions of the asteroid belt, approximately 3.5 kilometers in diameter. It was discovered on 26 October 1971, by Czech astronomer Luboš Kohoutek at Bergedorf Observatory in Hamburg, Germany. The asteroid was named after Czech composer Bedřich Smetana. Its sub-kilometer sized minor-planet moon was discovered in 2012.

== Classification and orbit ==
Smetana is a bright member of the Hungaria family, which form the innermost dense concentration of asteroids in the Solar System. It orbits the Sun in the inner main-belt at a distance of 1.9–1.9 AU once every 2 years and 7 months (936 days). Its orbit has an eccentricity of 0.00 and an inclination of 25° with respect to the ecliptic. The asteroid's observation arc begins with its official discovery observation at Bergedorf, with no precoveries taken, and no prior identifications made.

== Physical characteristics ==
Smetana is an assumed E-type asteroid.

=== Lightcurves ===
Between 2006 and 2012, several rotational lightcurves of Smetana were obtained from photometric observations by American astronomer Brian Warner at his Palmer Divide Observatory (716) and CS3–Palmer Divide Station (U82) in Colorado and California, respectively. Lightcurve analysis gave a rotation period between 2.4801 and 2.498 hours with a brightness variation of between 0.12 and 0.16 magnitude (U=2+/2+/3/3).

=== Satellite ===
During Warner's photometric observations in 2012, it was revealed that Smetana is a synchronous binary asteroid with an orbiting minor-planet moon. The satellite orbits its primary every 22.43 hours and measures approximately 0.63 kilometers in diameter. However the binary status of Smetana has not yet been confirmed unambiguously, since observations in 2016 could not clearly detect any mutual occultation and eclipsing events.

=== Diameter and albedo ===
According to the surveys carried out by the NEOWISE mission of NASA's Wide-field Infrared Survey Explorer, Smetana measures 3.131 kilometers in diameter and its surface has an albedo of 0.544. The Collaborative Asteroid Lightcurve Link assumes an albedo of 0.30 – a compromise value between 0.4 and 0.2, corresponding to the Hungaria asteroids both as family and orbital group – and calculates a diameter of 3.85 kilometers with an absolute magnitude of 14.0.

== Naming ==
This minor planet was named for the Czech national composer Bedřich Smetana (1824–1884), best known for the opera The Bartered Bride, the cycle of six symphonic poems My homeland and the string quartet From my life. The official naming citation was published by the Minor Planet Center on 1 July 1979 (M.P.C. 4786).
