= (11436) 1969 QR =

Main-belt asteroid

Discovery
- Discovered by: L. Kohoutek
- Discovery site: Bergedorf Obs.
- Discovery date: 22 August 1969

Designations
- Alternative designations: 1988 DP
- Minor planet category: main-belt · Flora

Orbital characteristics
- Epoch 4 September 2017 (JD 2458000.5)
- Uncertainty parameter 0
- Observation arc: 47.51 yr (17,352 days)
- Aphelion: 2.5411 AU
- Perihelion: 1.9081 AU
- Semi-major axis: 2.2246 AU
- Eccentricity: 0.1423
- Orbital period (sidereal): 3.32 yr (1,212 days)
- Mean anomaly: 195.20°
- Mean motion: 0° 17^{m} 49.2^{s} / day
- Inclination: 7.3470°
- Longitude of ascending node: 239.46°
- Argument of perihelion: 56.011°

Physical characteristics
- Dimensions: 3.74 km (calculated)
- Synodic rotation period: 2.65 h
- Geometric albedo: 0.24 (assumed)
- Spectral type: S
- Absolute magnitude (H): 14.3 · 14.60±0.33

(11436) 1969 QR is a stony Florian asteroid from the inner regions of the asteroid belt, approximately 3.7 kilometers in diameter. It was discovered on 22 August 1969, by Czech astronomer Luboš Kohoutek at Bergedorf Observatory in Hamburg, Germany.

== Description ==
The S-type asteroid is a member of the Flora family, one of the largest groups of stony asteroids in the main-belt. It orbits the Sun at a distance of 1.9–2.5 AU once every 3 years and 4 months (1,212 days). Its orbit has an eccentricity of 0.14 and an inclination of 7° with respect to the ecliptic. As no precoveries were taken, the asteroid's observation arc starts with its discovery observation in 1969.

A rotational lightcurve for this asteroid was published by several Hungarian astronomers in August 2005. The photometric observations gave a rotation period of 2.65 hours with a brightness variation of 0.27 magnitude (U=2).

The Collaborative Asteroid Lightcurve Link assumes an albedo of 0.24 – derived from 8 Flora, the largest member and namesake of its orbital family – and calculates a diameter of 3.7 kilometers.

== Numbering and naming ==
This minor planet was numbered by the Minor Planet Center on 28 September 1999. As of 2018, it has not been named.
