= 1861 Komenský =

Main-belt asteroid

Discovery
- Discovered by: L. Kohoutek
- Discovery site: Bergedorf Obs.
- Discovery date: 24 November 1970

Designations
- Named after: John Amos Comenius (Czech theologist)
- Alternative designations: 1970 WB
- Minor planet category: main-belt · (outer); Eos

Orbital characteristics
- Epoch 4 September 2017 (JD 2458000.5)
- Uncertainty parameter 0
- Observation arc: 45.98 yr (16,793 days)
- Aphelion: 3.2152 AU
- Perihelion: 2.8261 AU
- Semi-major axis: 3.0207 AU
- Eccentricity: 0.0644
- Orbital period (sidereal): 5.25 yr (1,918 days)
- Mean anomaly: 83.442°
- Mean motion: 0° 11^{m} 15.72^{s} / day
- Inclination: 10.456°
- Longitude of ascending node: 23.586°
- Argument of perihelion: 267.92°

Physical characteristics
- Dimensions: 14.815±0.148; 20±8 km (generic)
- Geometric albedo: 0.158±0.022
- Absolute magnitude (H): 11.7

1861 Komenský, provisional designation 1970 WB, is an Eoan asteroid from the outer region of the asteroid belt, estimated to measure approximately 15 kilometers in diameter. It was discovered on 24 November 1970, by Czech astronomer Luboš Kohoutek at the Bergedorf Observatory in Hamburg, Germany, and named after John Amos Comenius.

== Orbit and classification ==
Komenský is a member of the Eos family (606), the largest asteroid family in the outer main belt consisting of nearly 10,000 asteroids. It orbits the Sun in the outer main-belt at a distance of 2.8–3.2 AU once every 5 years and 3 months (1,918 days). Its orbit has an eccentricity of 0.06 and an inclination of 10° with respect to the ecliptic. Komenský's observation arc begins with its official discovery observation, as no precoveries and no previous identifications were made.

== Physical characteristics ==
According to the survey carried out by NASA's Wide-field Infrared Survey Explorer with its subsequent NEOWISE mission, Komenský measures 14.8 kilometers in diameter and its surface has an albedo of 0.158. Based on an absolute magnitude of 11.7, and assuming an albedo in the range of 0.05 to 0.25, the asteroid has a generic mean diameter of 12 to 28 kilometers. As of 2016, Komenský's composition, rotation period and shape remain unknown.

== Naming ==
This minor planet was named in honor of Czech educational reformer and theologist, John Amos Comenius (1592–1670), known as Jan Amos Komenský in the original Czech language. He is considered the father of modern education and spend most of his life in exile. The official naming citation was published by the Minor Planet Center on 20 December 1974 (M.P.C. 3757).
