= 1842 Hynek =

Stony main-belt asteroid

Discovery
- Discovered by: L. Kohoutek
- Discovery site: Hamburg Observatory
- Discovery date: 14 January 1972

Designations
- Named after: Hynek Kohoutek (father of discoverer)
- Alternative designations: 1972 AA · 1928 DE; 1929 SO · 1952 DN_{2} 1953 UV · 1962 EA; 1963 SS · 1964 YF; 1966 HE · 1969 EG_{1} 2004 TE_{363}
- Minor planet category: main-belt · Flora

Orbital characteristics
- Epoch 4 September 2017 (JD 2458000.5)
- Uncertainty parameter 0
- Observation arc: 87.59 yr (31,992 days)
- Aphelion: 2.6758 AU
- Perihelion: 1.8568 AU
- Semi-major axis: 2.2663 AU
- Eccentricity: 0.1807
- Orbital period (sidereal): 3.41 yr (1,246 days)
- Mean anomaly: 339.54°
- Mean motion: 0° 17^{m} 20.04^{s} / day
- Inclination: 5.3539°
- Longitude of ascending node: 153.45°
- Argument of perihelion: 125.55°

Physical characteristics
- Dimensions: 7.996±0.073; 8.171±0.027 km 9.31±1.70 km 9.80 km (calculated)
- Synodic rotation period: 3.94±0.02 h 3.9410±0.0007 h
- Geometric albedo: 0.20 (assumed); 0.28±0.14; 0.2899±0.0415; 0.300±0.073
- Spectral type: Tholen = S · S B–V = 0.871; U–B = 0.522
- Absolute magnitude (H): 12.41 · 12.89±0.41

1842 Hynek, provisional designation 1972 AA, is a stony Florian asteroid from the inner regions of the asteroid belt, approximately 8 kilometers in diameter.

The asteroid was discovered on 14 January 1972 by Czech astronomer Luboš Kohoutek at Hamburg Observatory, who named it after his father, Hynek Kohoutek.

== Orbit and classification ==
Hynek is member of the Flora family. It orbits the Sun in the inner main-belt at a distance of 1.9–2.7 AU once every 3 years and 5 months (1,246 days). Its orbit has an eccentricity of 0.18 and an inclination of 5° with respect to the ecliptic.

First identified as 1928 DE at Heidelberg, the asteroid's observation arc begins with its first used observation taken at Lowell Observatory in 1929, when it was identified as 1929 SO, nearly 43 years prior to its official discovery observation at Hamburg.

== Physical characteristics ==
In the Tholen classification, Hynek is characterized as a common S-type asteroid.

=== Rotation period ===
In July 2007, the so-far best rated rotational lightcurve of Hynek was obtained from photometric observations by French amateur astronomer Pierre Antonini. Lightcurve analysis gave a well-defined rotation period of 3.9410 hours with a brightness variation of 0.17 magnitude (U=3).

=== Diameter and albedo ===
According to the surveys carried out by NASA's Wide-field Infrared Survey Explorer with its subsequent NEOWISE mission, Hynek measures between 7.996 and 9.31 kilometers in diameter, and its surface has an albedo between 0.28 of 0.300.

The Collaborative Asteroid Lightcurve Link assumes a standard albedo for stony asteroids of 0.20 and calculates a diameter of 9.80 kilometers with an absolute magnitude of 12.41.

== Naming ==
This minor planet was named after Hynek Kohoutek, the father of the discoverer, celebrating his 70th birthday. The official naming citation was published by the Minor Planet Center on 20 December 1974 (M.P.C. 3757).
