= Comet Observation Database =

Astronomy database

The light curve of the comet C/1973 E1 (Kohoutek) plotted from ground-based observations collected by COBS

The Comet Observation Database (COBS) is an online astronomy database of visual and CCD observations of comets. Open to amateur astronomers, it systematically collects sets of parameters of comet observations to make them available to the wider public and the research community. As of September 2025, the database contained over 288,700 observations of more than 1640 comets. It is considered an important resource for analysis of comet behavior, such as changes in brightness as the comets pass through the visual range, and one of the most prominent image repositories for amateur astronomers.

The database is hosted by the Črni Vrh Observatory in Slovenia, which originally provided a service to Slovenian astronomers for correct formatting of submissions to the International Comet Quarterly (ICQ). In 2010, this service was upgraded to a database and a decision was made to open the submission to the worldwide public. The submitted data is openly available for viewing, analysis with the associated website's tools or exporting for further analysis. It continues to use the ICQ format for submissions, with automated tools for facilitating correct formatting.
