= 1933 Tinchen =

Vestian main-belt asteroid

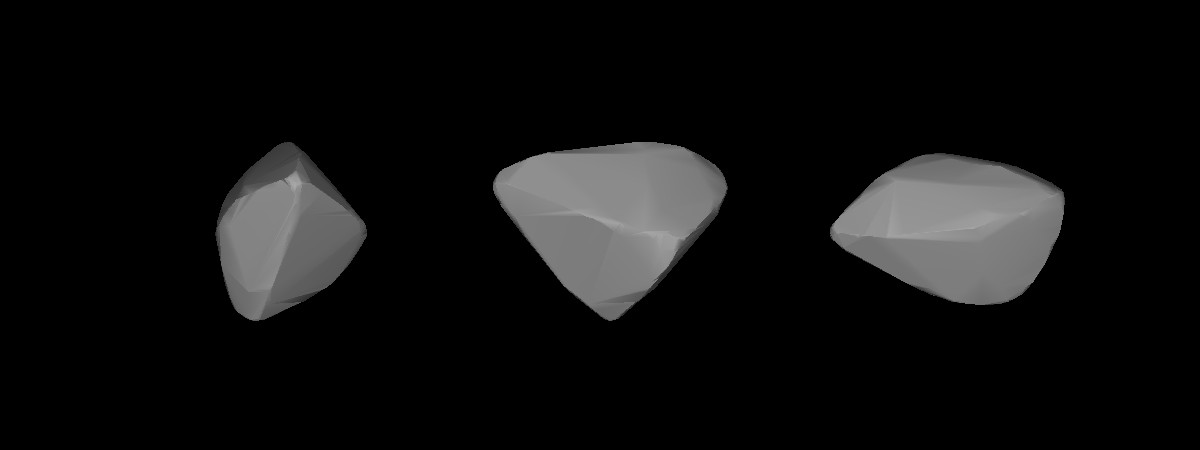
- Lightcurve-based 3D-model of Tinchen

Discovery
- Discovered by: L. Kohoutek
- Discovery site: Bergedorf Obs.
- Discovery date: 14 January 1972

Designations
- Named after: Christine Kohoutek (wife of the discoverer)
- Alternative designations: 1972 AC · 1956 TB; 1956 VE · 1962 JF; 1962 JS
- Minor planet category: main-belt · Vesta

Orbital characteristics
- Epoch 4 September 2017 (JD 2458000.5)
- Uncertainty parameter 0
- Observation arc: 60.59 yr (22,131 days)
- Aphelion: 2.6437 AU
- Perihelion: 2.0617 AU
- Semi-major axis: 2.3527 AU
- Eccentricity: 0.1237
- Orbital period (sidereal): 3.61 yr (1,318 days)
- Mean anomaly: 315.04°
- Mean motion: 0° 16^{m} 23.16^{s} / day
- Inclination: 6.8822°
- Longitude of ascending node: 164.93°
- Argument of perihelion: 214.52°

Physical characteristics
- Dimensions: 4.51±0.11 km 5.04 km (calculated); 6.454±0.041 km
- Synodic rotation period: 3.67±0.07 h 3.6703±0.0006 h 3.671±0.005 h 3.672±0.003 h (Note: Ryan 2007 (web) figures at LCDB for results of LCDB – 1933 Tinchen)
- Geometric albedo: 0.2950±0.0588; 0.4 (assumed); 0.613±0.029
- Spectral type: V
- Absolute magnitude (H): 12.769±0.003 (R) · 12.88 · 12.9 · 13.07±0.32 · 13.1

1933 Tinchen, provisional designation 1972 AC, is a Vestian asteroid from the inner regions of the asteroid belt, about 5 kilometers in diameter. It was discovered on 14 January 1972, by Czech astronomer Luboš Kohoutek at the Hamburger Bergedorf Observatory in Germany, who named it after his wife, Christine Kohoutek.

== Classification and orbit ==
Tinchen orbits the Sun in the inner main-belt at a distance of 2.1–2.6 AU once every 3 years and 7 months (1,318 days). Its orbit has an eccentricity of 0.12 and an inclination of 7° with respect to the ecliptic.

The vestoid or V-type asteroid is also a member of the Vesta family. Asteroids with these spectral and orbital characteristics are thought to have all originated from Rheasilvia, a large impact crater on the south-polar surface of 4 Vesta, which is the main-belt's second-most-massive asteroid after 1 Ceres.

== Physical characteristics ==
Tinchen has a rotation period of 3.671 hours.

According to the survey carried out by NASA's Wide-field Infrared Survey Explorer with its subsequent NEOWISE mission, Tinchen measures between 4.51 and 6.454 kilometers in diameter and its surface has an albedo between 0.2950 and 0.613. The Collaborative Asteroid Lightcurve Link assumes a standard albedo for Vestian asteroids of 0.40 and calculates a diameter of 5.04 kilometers with an absolute magnitude of 13.1.

== Naming ==
The discoverer named this minor planet after his wife, Christine Kohoutek. The official naming citation was published by the Minor Planet Center on 20 February 1976 (M.P.C. 3938).
