= 1840 Hus =

Stony main-belt asteroid

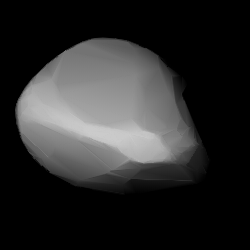
- Shape model of Hus from its lightcurve

Discovery
- Discovered by: L. Kohoutek
- Discovery site: Bergedorf Obs.
- Discovery date: 26 October 1971

Designations
- Named after: Jan Hus (early Reformer)
- Alternative designations: 1971 UY · 1931 TS_{3} 1935 NC · 1953 CG
- Minor planet category: main-belt · (outer); Koronis

Orbital characteristics
- Epoch 27 April 2019 (JD 2458600.5)
- Uncertainty parameter 0
- Observation arc: 86.72 yr (31,673 d)
- Aphelion: 2.9646 AU
- Perihelion: 2.8731 AU
- Semi-major axis: 2.9188 AU
- Eccentricity: 0.0157
- Orbital period (sidereal): 4.99 yr (1,821 d)
- Mean anomaly: 174.31°
- Mean motion: 0° 11^{m} 51.36^{s} / day
- Inclination: 2.4077°
- Longitude of ascending node: 40.525°
- Argument of perihelion: 14.250°

Physical characteristics
- Mean diameter: 12.446±0.193 km 12.592±0.123 km
- Synodic rotation period: 4.7483±0.0008 h
- Geometric albedo: 0.2554±0.0232; 0.261±0.043
- Spectral type: S (family-based)
- Absolute magnitude (H): 11.6; 11.7

1840 Hus (prov. designation: 1971 UY) is a stony Koronis asteroid from the outer regions of the asteroid belt, approximately 12.5 kilometers (7.8 miles) in diameter. It was discovered on 26 October 1971, by Czech astronomer Luboš Kohoutek at the Bergedorf Observatory in Hamburg, Germany. The S-type asteroid has a rotation period of 4.8 hours and is likely elongated in shape. It was later named after 15th-century theologian Jan Hus.

== Orbit and classification ==
Hus is a core member of the Koronis family (605), a very large asteroid family of almost 6,000 known asteroids with nearly co-planar ecliptical orbits. It orbits the Sun in the outer main-belt at a distance of 2.9–3.0 AU once every 5 years (1,821 days; semi-major axis of 2.92 AU). Its orbit has an eccentricity of 0.02 and an inclination of 2° with respect to the ecliptic. Hus was first observed as 1931 TS_{3} at the Lowell Observatory in October 1931. The body's observation arc begins with its observation as 1953 CG at the Goethe Link Observatory in January 1953, more than 18 years prior to its official discovery observation at Hamburg.

== Physical characteristics ==
Based on the asteroid's membership to the Koronis family and its relatively high geometric albedo determined by the Wide-field Infrared Survey Explorer (WISE), Hus is very likely a stony S-type asteroid.

=== Rotation period and pole ===
In June 2006, a rotational lightcurve of Hus was obtained from photometric observations taken by Maurice Clark at the Chiro Observatory (320) in Western Australia. Lightcurve analysis gave a rotation period of 4.780±0.002 hours with a high brightness variation of 0.85 magnitude (U=2-), strongly indicative of an elongated, non-spherical shape. In March 2016, a synthetic lightcurve gave a similar period of 4.749057±0.000001 hours, using sparse-in-time photometry data from the Lowell Photometric Database (U=n.a.). More recent lightcurve analysis during observations of the 1840 Hus apparition in 2020, from the MIT Koronis Family Asteroids Rotation Lightcurve Observing Program, gave a secure rotation period of 4.7483±0.0008 hours.

=== Diameter and albedo ===
According to the survey carried out by NASA's WISE telescope with its subsequent NEOWISE mission, Hus measures 12.4 and 12.6 kilometers in diameter, and its surface has an albedo of 0.261 and 0.255, respectively. Conversely, the Collaborative Asteroid Lightcurve Link assumes a standard albedo for carbonaceous asteroids of 0.057, rather than one for a stony body, as indicated by WISE/NEOWISE – and calculates therefore a twice as large diameter of 25.4 kilometers, as the lower the albedo, the larger the body's diameter for a constant absolute magnitude.

== Naming ==
This minor planet was named after Czech Jan Hus (1372–1415), a fifteenth century Bohemian theologian, rector of Charles University in Prague and forerunner of the Protestant Reformation. He was condemned to death by the Council of Constance and burned at the stake for his reformation ideas. Jan Hus is also known as John Huss in the English speaking world. The official naming citation was published by the Minor Planet Center on 20 December 1974 (M.P.C. 3757).
