= Luboš Kohoutek =

Czech astronomer (1935–2023)

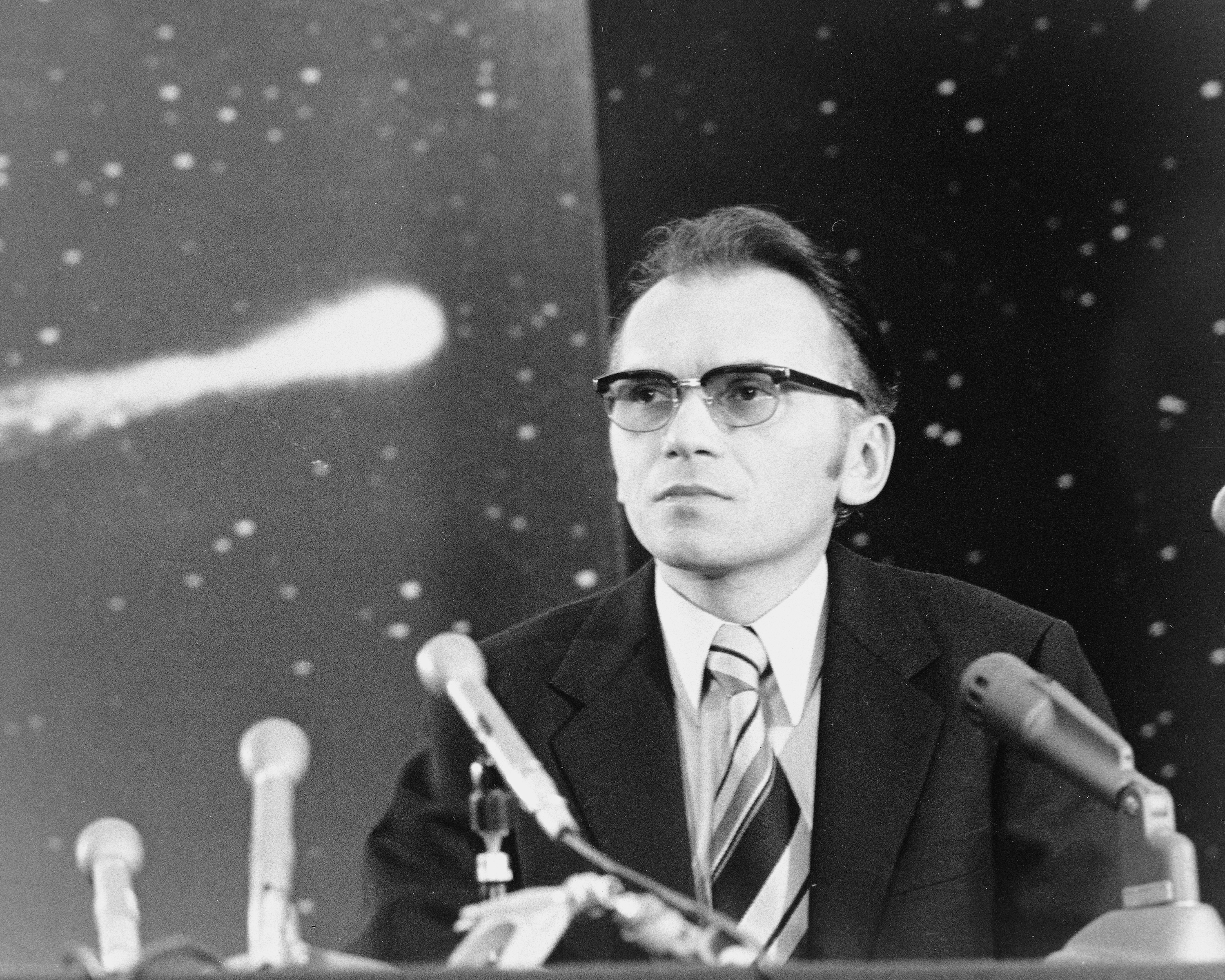
- Kohoutek in 1974
- Born: 29 January 1935; Zábřeh, Czechoslovakia
- Died: 30 December 2023 (aged 88); Bergedorf, Hamburg, Germany
- Education: Masaryk University
- Known for: Discovery of Comet Kohoutek and various minor planets
- Scientific career
- Fields: Planetary astronomy

Minor planets discovered: 76
see § List of discovered minor planets

Luboš Kohoutek (Czech pronunciation: [ˈkoɦou̯tɛk]; 29 January 1935 – 30 December 2023) was a Czech astronomer and a discoverer of minor planets and comets, including Comet Kohoutek which was visible to the naked eye in 1973. He also discovered a large number of planetary nebulae.

== Biography ==
Kohoutek was born on 29 January 1935 to Hynek and Jarmila Kohoutek. His brother was the Czech composer Ctirad Kohoutek.

Kohoutek was interested in astronomy since high school. He studied physics and astronomy at universities in Brno and Prague (finished 1958). Then he started to work in the Astronomical Institute of Czechoslovak Academy of Sciences, where he published a well-cited catalogue (Catalogue of Galactic Planetary Nebulae, 1967). Kohoutek obtained a long term position at the Bergedorf Observatory in Hamburg. After the Soviet occupation of Czechoslovakia (1968) he decided to stay in West Germany (1970). His discoveries in the 1970s made him well known in the media. In later years, Kohoutek worked in observatories in Spain and Chile, studying planetary nebulae. He officially retired in 2001, yet kept researching at the Hamburg-Bergedorf Observatory. Kohoutek published 162 scientific works.

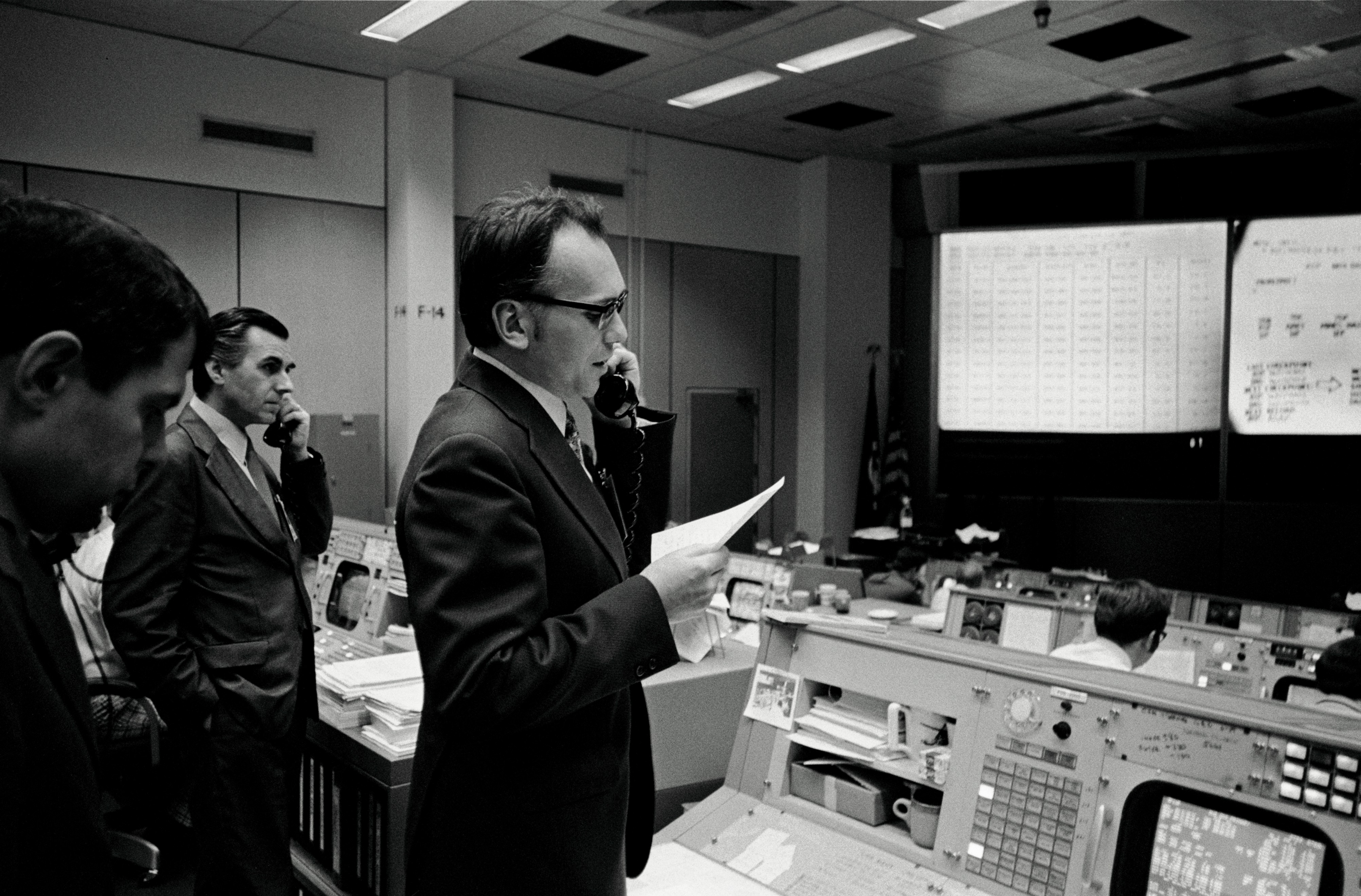
Kohoutek at NASA Johnson Space Center mission control center during Skylab 4 mission talking with the astronauts on board about the Comet Kohoutek observations

Kohoutek is most famous for his discovery of numerous comets, including periodic comets 75D/Kohoutek and 76P/West–Kohoutek–Ikemura, as well as the famously disappointing "Comet Kohoutek" (C/1973 E1).

Kohoutek also discovered numerous asteroids, including the Apollo asteroid 1865 Cerberus. The main-belt asteroid 1850 Kohoutek was named after him.

Kohoutek died on 30 December 2023, at the age of 88.

== Discoveries ==
Kohoutek discovered supernova SN 1973F, 5 comets, and 76 minor planets.

=== List of discovered comets ===
- 75D/Kohoutek
- 76P/West–Kohoutek–Ikemura
- C/1973 E1 (Kohoutek)
- C/1969 O1-A (Kohoutek)
- C/1973 D1 (Kohoutek)

=== List of discovered minor planets ===
| 1834 Palach | 22 August 1969 | list |
| 1840 Hus | 26 October 1971 | list |
| 1841 Masaryk | 26 October 1971 | list |
| 1842 Hynek | 14 January 1972 | list |
| 1843 Jarmila | 14 January 1972 | list |
| 1861 Komenský | 24 November 1970 | list |
| 1865 Cerberus | 26 October 1971 | list |
| 1875 Neruda | 22 August 1969 | list |
| 1894 Haffner | 26 October 1971 | list |
| 1895 Larink | 26 October 1971 | list |
| 1896 Beer | 26 October 1971 | list |
| 1897 Hind | 26 October 1971 | list |
| 1898 Cowell | 26 October 1971 | list |
| 1899 Crommelin | 26 October 1971 | list |
| 1901 Moravia | 14 January 1972 | list |
| 1931 Čapek | 22 August 1969 | list |
| 1932 Jansky | 26 October 1971 | list |
| 1933 Tinchen | 14 January 1972 | list |
| 1942 Jablunka | 30 September 1972 | list |
| 1963 Bezovec | 9 February 1975 | list |

| 1995 Hajek | 26 October 1971 | list |
| 1999 Hirayama | 27 February 1973 | list |
| 2047 Smetana | 26 October 1971 | list |
| 2055 Dvořák | 19 February 1974 | list |
| 2073 Janáček | 19 February 1974 | list |
| 2281 Biela | 26 October 1971 | list |
| 2375 Radek | 8 January 1975 | list |
| 2407 Haug | 27 February 1973 | list |
| 2418 Voskovec-Werich | 26 October 1971 | list |
| 2472 Bradman | 27 February 1973 | list |
| 2541 Edebono | 27 February 1973 | list |
| 2667 Oikawa | 30 October 1967 | list |
| 2767 Takenouchi | 30 October 1967 | list |
| 2838 Takase | 26 October 1971 | list |
| 2900 Lubos Perek | 14 January 1972 | list |
| 2901 Bagehot | 27 February 1973 | list |
| 3081 Martinůboh | 26 October 1971 | list |
| 3109 Machin | 19 February 1974 | list |
| 3303 Merta | 30 October 1967 | list |
| 3336 Grygar | 26 October 1971 | list |

| 3337 Miloš | 26 October 1971 | list |
| 3407 Jimmysimms | 28 February 1973 | list |
| 3475 Fichte | 4 October 1972 | list |
| 3514 Hooke | 26 October 1971 | list |
| 3627 Sayers | 28 February 1973 | list |
| 3635 Kreutz | 21 November 1981 | list |
| 3769 Arthurmiller | 30 October 1967 | list^{[A]} |
| 3825 Nürnberg | 30 October 1967 | list |
| 4137 Crabtree | 24 November 1970 | list |
| 4425 Bilk | 30 October 1967 | list |
| 5268 Černohorský | 26 October 1971 | list |
| 6215 Mehdia | 7 March 1973 | list |
| (6431) 1967 UT | 30 October 1967 | list |
| (6680) 1970 WD | 24 November 1970 | list |
| (7044) 1971 UK | 26 October 1971 | list |
| 7806 Umasslowell | 26 October 1971 | list |
| (8606) 1971 UG | 26 October 1971 | list |
| (8607) 1971 UT | 26 October 1971 | list |
| (8779) 1971 UH_{1} | 26 October 1971 | list |
| (9513) 1971 UN | 26 October 1971 | list |

| 10003 Caryhuang | 26 October 1971 | list |
| (10260) 1972 TC | 4 October 1972 | list |
| (10987) 1967 US | 30 October 1967 | list |
| (11250) 1972 AU | 14 January 1972 | list |
| (11436) 1969 QR | 22 August 1969 | list |
| (11783) 1971 UN_{1} | 26 October 1971 | list |
| (11784) 1971 UT_{1} | 26 October 1971 | list |
| (14311) 1971 UK_{1} | 26 October 1971 | list |
| (16351) 1971 US | 26 October 1971 | list |
| (20960) 1971 UR | 26 October 1971 | list |
| (24600) 1971 UQ | 26 October 1971 | list |
| 24601 Valjean | 26 October 1971 | list |
| (29076) 1972 TR_{8} | 4 October 1972 | list |
| (37527) 1971 UJ_{1} | 26 October 1971 | list |
| (58094) 1972 AP | 14 January 1972 | list |
| (85118) 1971 UU | 26 October 1971 | list |
Co-discovery made with:^{A} A. Kriete
