= 75D/Kohoutek =

Lost comet

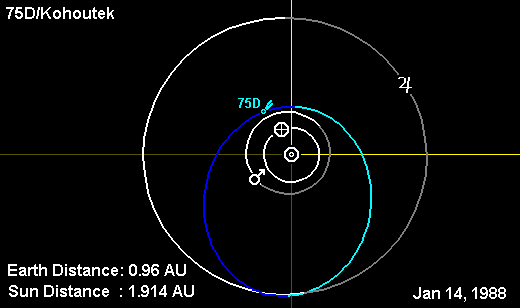
- Orbit of Comet 75D/Kohoutek

Discovery
- Discovered by: Luboš Kohoutek
- Discovery site: Hamburg-Bergedorf Observatory
- Discovery date: 9 February 1975

Designations
- MPC designation: D/1975 C1, D/1980 P1
- Alternative designations: 1975 III, 1981 IX; 1987 XXVII; 1975c, 1980j, 1986k

Orbital characteristics
- Epoch: 25 February 2023 (JD 2460000.5)
- Observation arc: 13.27 years (Not observed in 38 years)
- Number of observations: 104
- Aphelion: 5.3 AU
- Perihelion: 1.77 AU
- Semi-major axis: 3.54 AU
- Eccentricity: 0.499
- Orbital period: 6.7 years
- Inclination: 5.92°
- Longitude of ascending node: 269.6°
- Argument of periapsis: 175.5°
- Mean anomaly: 106.6°
- Last perihelion: 7 March 2021? (last seen 1988)
- Next perihelion: 2 November 2027? (assumed)
- T_{Jupiter}: 2.894
- Earth MOID: 0.8 AU

Physical characteristics
- Mean radius: 1.7 km (1.1 mi)
- Comet total magnitude (M1): 10.5
- Comet nuclear magnitude (M2): 14.5
- Apparent magnitude: 14.0 (1975 apparition)

75D/Kohoutek is a periodic comet discovered in February 1975, by Luboš Kohoutek. Even on the discovery plate the comet was only apparent magnitude 14. The comet was last observed in 1988 and has not been observed in 38 years.

Not to be confused with the much better-known C/1973 E1 (Kohoutek), 75D is a repeat visitor to the inner Solar System, with a period of about seven years. It was placed on the discovery orbit when it passed 0.143 AU (21.4 million km) from Jupiter on 28 July 1972. Apparitions have been dim, with the brightest being in 1988 at about apparent magnitude 13. It was not seen in 1994, 2000, 2007, 2014, or 2021. The comet has been estimated to be 4.6 km (2.9 mi) in diameter.

This comet was last observed by Mauna Kea on 19 May 1988. The Minor Planet Center has given the comet a "D/" designation as the comet is believed to be lost.

In August 2026 the comet is calculated to come to opposition in the constellation of Aquarius at around apparent magnitude 19.5. In late January 2028 it may come to opposition in the constellation of Cancer at around apparent magnitude 16.

== See also ==
- List of numbered comets

Numbered comets
Previous; 74P/Smirnova–Chernykh	75D/Kohoutek	Next; 76P/West–Kohoutek–Ikemura
