= 76P/West–Kohoutek–Ikemura =

Jupiter-family comet

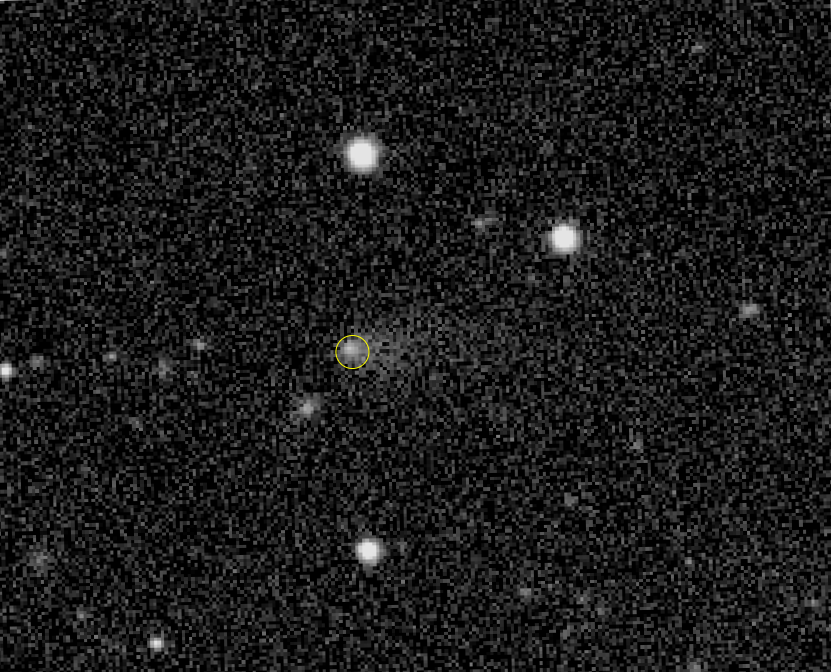
- 76P/W–K–I photographed from the Zwicky Transient Facility on 29 December 2019

Discovery
- Discovered by: Richard M. West; Lubos Kohoutek; Toshihiko Ikemura
- Discovery site: Geneva, Switzerland; Hamburg, Germany; Shinshiro, Japan
- Discovery date: January–March 1975

Designations
- MPC designation: P/1975 D1, P/1980 V2
- Alternative designations: 1975 IV, 1981 VIII; 1987 XV, 1993 XXI; 1975b, 1980r; 1987x, 1993o

Orbital characteristics
- Epoch: 21 January 2022 (JD 2459600.5)
- Observation arc: 48.44 years
- Earliest precovery date: 15 October 1974
- Number of observations: 1,281
- Aphelion: 5.341 AU
- Perihelion: 1.603 AU
- Semi-major axis: 3.472 AU
- Eccentricity: 0.53829
- Orbital period: 6.469 years
- Inclination: 30.466°
- Longitude of ascending node: 84.109°
- Argument of periapsis: 359.95°
- Mean anomaly: 124.62°
- Last perihelion: 13 April 2026
- Next perihelion: 22 September 2032
- T_{Jupiter}: 2.685
- Earth MOID: 0.616 AU (92.2 million km)
- Jupiter MOID: 0.046 AU (6.9 million km)

Physical characteristics
- Dimensions: 0.62 km (0.39 mi)
- Mean density: 500±70 kg/m^{3}
- Synodic rotation period: 6.6±1.0 hours
- Comet total magnitude (M1): 15.4
- Comet nuclear magnitude (M2): 17.2

76P/West–Kohoutek–Ikemura is a Jupiter-family comet with a current orbital period of 6.47 years around the Sun. It last came to perihelion on 13 April 2026 and will next come to perihelion on 22 September 2032.

== Discovery and observations ==
The comet was initially spotted on a photographic plate by Richard M. West at the European Southern Observatory Sky Atlas Laboratory, Geneva in January 1975, when it had a brightness of magnitude 12. Inability to predict its movement from a single image meant the comet had to be presumed lost.

In late February it was accidentally rediscovered by Lubos Kohoutek at the Hamburg Observatory, Germany and independently on 1 March by Toshihiko Ikemura in Shinshiro, Japan. After further observations the comet's parabolic orbit was computed, which gave a perihelion date of 23 March 1975. It was demonstrated that all three sightings were of the same object, which was accordingly designated 76P/West–Kohoutek–Ikemura.

The comet has been observed at its successive returns in 1987, 1993, 2000, 2006 and 2013.

== Orbit ==
Further calculations by Brian G. Marsden determined the comet's elliptical orbit and revealed that it had passed only 0.012 AU (1.8 million km) from Jupiter on 22 March 1972. This close approach had reduced its orbital frequency from some 30 years to the current 6.48 years and its perihelion distance from 4.78 AU to 1.60 AU.

== Physical characteristics ==
Its nucleus is estimated to have an effective radius of 0.31 ± 0.01 km (0.1926 ± 0.0062 mi) and its rotational period is estimated to be 6.6±1.0 hours.

== See also ==
- List of numbered comets

Numbered comets
Previous; 75D/Kohoutek	76P/West–Kohoutek–Ikemura	Next; 77P/Longmore
