= C/1973 E1 (Kohoutek) =

Non-periodic comet

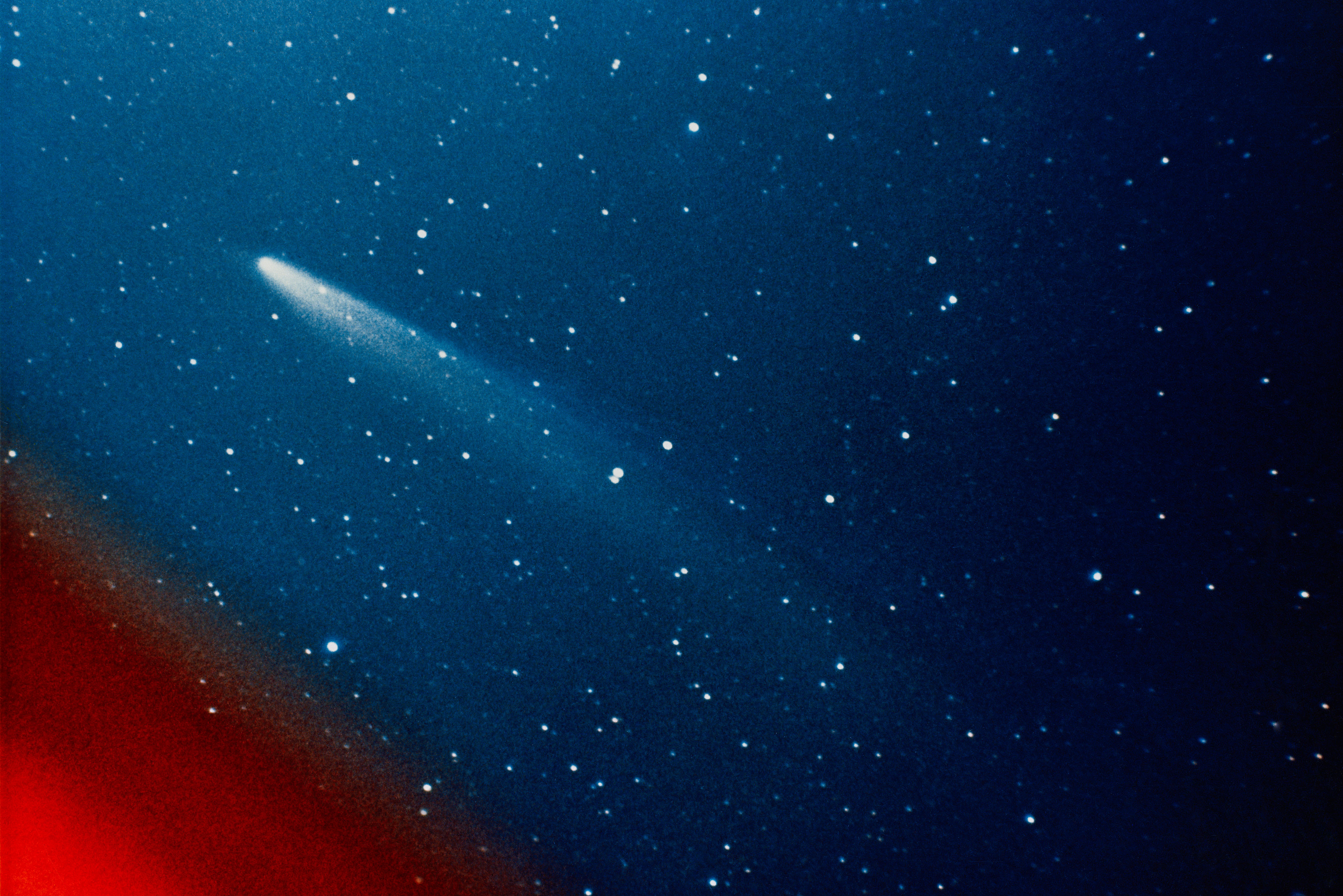
- Comet Kohoutek on 11 January 1974 as seen from the Catalina Observatory

Discovery
- Discovered by: Luboš Kohoutek
- Discovery date: 18 March 1973

Designations
- Alternative designations: 1973f, 1973 XII

Orbital characteristics
- Epoch: 24 December 1973 (JD 2442040.5)
- Observation arc: 1.24 years (453 days)
- Earliest precovery date: 28 January 1973
- Number of observations: 812
- Aphelion: 98,000 AU (inbound); 3,700 AU (outbound)
- Perihelion: 0.142 AU
- Eccentricity: 0.999997 (inbound); 0.99992 (outbound)
- Orbital period: ≈11 million years (inbound) ≈80,000 years (outbound)
- Inclination: 14.304°
- Longitude of ascending node: 258.489°
- Argument of periapsis: 37.798°
- Last perihelion: 28 December 1973
- Earth MOID: 0.029 AU
- Jupiter MOID: 0.399 AU

Physical characteristics
- Mean diameter: 4.2 km (2.6 mi)
- Geometric albedo: 0.67 (Note: Most comets have an albedo of around 0.04)
- Comet total magnitude (M1): 5.8
- Comet nuclear magnitude (M2): 9.5
- Apparent magnitude: −3.0 (1973 apparition); 0.0 (ground observers)

Comet Kohoutek (pronounced "ko-HU-tek" /koʊˈhuːtɛk/, or "ko-ho-tek" /koʊhoʊtɛk/), (Note: A teaching guide published by the Educational Programs Branch of the NASA Goddard Space Flight Center lists the pronunciation of Kohoutek as "KŌ-HÜ'-TEK". A January 1974 article in the New York Times provided the phonetic pronunciation "ko-ho-tek" without any accented syllables. A special report on the comet in Time gave the phonetic pronunciation "ko-hoe-tek".) formally designated as C/1973 E1, 1973 XII and 1973f, (Note: The designation C/1973 E1 reflects the modern comet designation scheme adopted by the International Astronomical Union in 1995 and indicates that Comet Kohoutek appeared once and was the first comet discovered in the first half of March 1973. However, during the time of perihelion the comet was contemporaneously designated as 1973f, as it was the sixth comet discovered in 1973, or alternatively as 1973 XII, as the comet was the twelfth to reach perihelion in 1973.) is a comet that passed close to the Sun towards the end of 1973. Early predictions of the comet's peak brightness suggested that it had the potential to become one of the brightest comets of the 20th century, capturing the attention of the wider public and the press and earning the comet the moniker of "Comet of the Century". Although Kohoutek became rather bright, the comet was ultimately far dimmer than the optimistic projections: its apparent magnitude peaked at only −3 (as opposed to predictions of roughly magnitude −10), and it was visible for only a short period, quickly dimming below naked-eye visibility by the end of January 1974. (Note: All mentions of apparent magnitude in this article refer to brightness in visible light unless otherwise noted.)

The comet was discovered by and named after Luboš Kohoutek at the Hamburg Observatory on 18 March 1973; Kohoutek had been searching for Biela's Comet and had serendipitously discovered his eponymous comet while reviewing photographic plates for a different object. The comet was discovered farther away from the Sun than any previous comet. Conventional practices for predicting comet brightness led to generous projections of Comet Kohoutek's luminosity towards the end of 1973 and the beginning of 1974, leading to great anticipation within both scientific circles and the general public. Comet Kohoutek reached perihelion on 28 December 1973. Though the comet was then at its brightest, it could only be observed by scientific instrumentation and astronauts on Skylab. For most ground observers, Kohoutek only reached as bright as magnitude 0 when it emerged from the Sun's glare in January 1974. It quickly faded beyond naked-eye visibility later that month and was last observed in November 1974. Due to its underwhelming brightness after intense publicity, Kohoutek became synonymous with spectacular disappointment.

Because of its early detection and unique characteristics, numerous scientific assets were dedicated to observing Kohoutek during its 1973–1974 traversal of the inner Solar System, making Kohoutek the most well-studied comet at the time; the resulting findings significantly advanced the understanding of comets. The identification of larger and more complex molecules emanating from Kohoutek alongside related but simpler chemical species confirmed the hypothesis that comets were composed of larger molecules that dissociated into simpler products. The significant presence of gasses and plasma expelled from Kohoutek supported the longstanding "dirty snowball" hypothesis concerning the composition of comet nuclei. The detection of water, (Note: Observations identified the cation of water (H_{2}O^{+}) in Kohoutek. It would not be until Comet Bradfield (1974 III) that neutral water (H_{2}O) was detected in a comet.) methyl cyanide, hydrogen cyanide, and silicon in Kohoutek were the first time such chemical species were observed in any comet. Its underwhelming display challenged longstanding assumptions regarding the light curve of similar comets entering the inner Solar System.

Kohoutek's highly eccentric orbit preceding its 1973 perihelion suggests that it may have been formed early in the formation of the Solar System or originated from a different planetary system. Its orbital period may have been initially in the order of several million years, or its 1973 apparition may have been its first trek into the inner Solar System. Its nucleus has an estimated average radius of 2.1 km (1.3 mi).

== Discovery ==
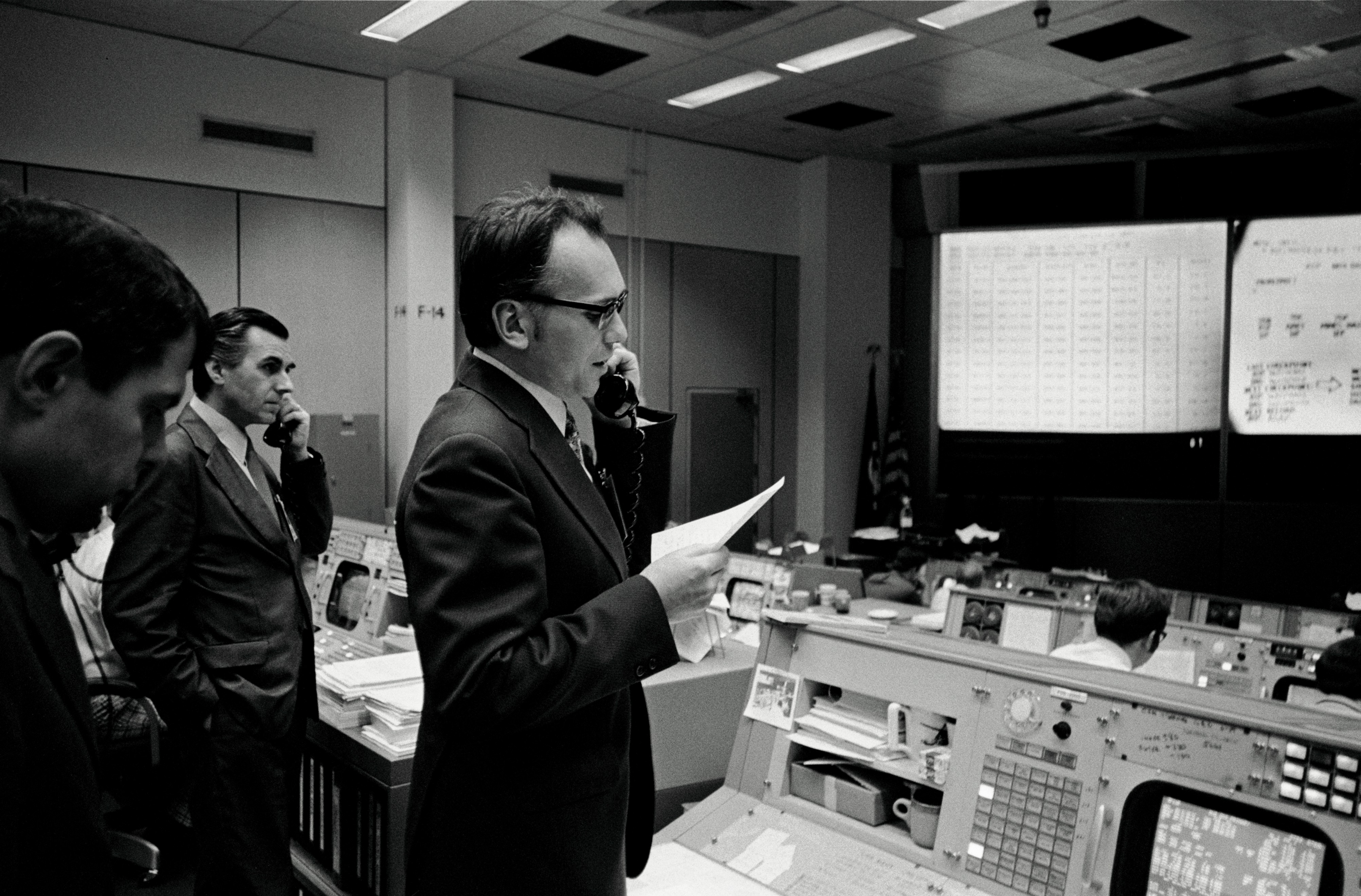
Luboš Kohoutek, eponymous discoverer of Comet Kohoutek, at the mission control center at Johnson Space Center speaking with the astronauts of Skylab 4 during the passage of the comet in January 1974

The comet was discovered on 18 March 1973 by Czech astronomer Luboš Kohoutek after reviewing twice-exposed photographic plates taken by the 80 cm (31 in) aperture Schmidt camera at the Hamburg Observatory in Bergedorf on 7 and 9 March. The object remained evident and was displaced slightly towards the west-northwest in the latter plate, confirming that it was moving against the background stars and not a transient or erroneous feature. Upon discovery, the comet had an apparent magnitude between 15.5 and 16 and lay in the constellation of Hydra; Kouhoutek described the comet as initially "diffuse with central condensation". The comet was located near the orbit of Jupiter around the time of discovery, 4.7 AU (700 million km) away from the Sun and 4.0 AU (600 million km) from the Earth. As a result, the comet was moving very slowly towards the west-northwest at around 0.2° per day. Based on subsequent orbital calculations, the discovery of the comet occurred roughly seven months before perihelion. The discovery of a comet at such large distances and long leadtimes before their perihelia was unprecedented; at the time comets were rarely discovered at such large distances from the Sun, as most were too faint to be detected. Kohoutek transmitted his findings to the Central Bureau for Astronomical Telegrams on 19 March, leading to the announcement of his discovery in circular 2511 of the International Astronomical Union. It was the sixth comet discovered in 1973 and thus given the designation 1973f. Due to increasing public attention towards the comet, the comet was also named Comet Kohoutek in honor of its discoverer Luboš Kohoutek.

The comet's discovery was serendipitous: beginning in 1971, Kohoutek had been searching for Biela's Comet, which had not been observed since 1852. Using the Hamburg Observatory's Schmidt camera, the initial search in October and November 1971 found 52 minor planets in a roughly 180-square-degree region of the sky. Preliminary orbits were determined for 35 of these newly-found objects, of which 15 were targeted for observation between January and April 1973. The 7 March photographic plate was intended to feature one of the objects, main-belt asteroid (8606) 1971 UG, (Note: (8606) 1971 UG is a main-belt asteroid about 10 km in diameter discovered by Kohoutek on 26 October 1971. It is also known as 1980 RT_{3} and 1995 UZ_{44}. It has been observed every year since 1998.) but instead captured Comet Kohoutek. Comet Kohoutek was later precovered on a photographic plate taken on 28 January, exhibiting a similar brightness as during its discovery and a heliocentric distance of 5.2 AU (780 million km). The plate was also taken in pursuit of (8606) 1971 UG. The comet was the second discovered by Kohoutek in 1973; the first had been discovered on 28 February during the same search for Biela's Comet and was also found on a photographic plate that was intended to contain another of the newly discovered minor planets. (Note: The first comet discovered by Kohoutek in 1973 was designated 1973e (modern designation: C/1973 D1) and has an orbital period of about 36,751 years. It reached its perihelion on 7 June 1973 and was last observed in October 1973.)

== Orbit ==
The orbits and timings of Comet Kohoutek near its perihelion (in red) and the Earth (in blue)

Orbital elements for Comet Kohoutek were calculated by British astronomer Brian G. Marsden soon after the comet's discovery, using photographic plates taken of the comet on 7 March, 9 March, and 21 March. These calculations suggested that Kohoutek had a nearly parabolic orbit lying close to the ecliptic with an eccentricity between 0.9999 and 1 and an inclination of 14.3°. Such an orbit meant that the comet would approach very close to the Sun, with perihelion occurring on 28 December 1973 at a distance of only 0.14 AU (21 million km). The close perihelion and the comet's brightness upon discovery were analogous to other comets that had become very bright. The calculated orbit also suggested that Kohoutek's close pass of the Sun could be its first traversal of the inner Solar System. Marsden's calculated orbit placed Kohoutek's initial semi-major axis at 50,000 AU (0.79 ly). Alternatively, Kohoutek may have had an orbital period of 4 million years before experiencing the gravitational perturbations from the Solar System's planets, which would make Kohoutek a long-period comet. This idea was supported by Stephen P. Maran, the head of NASA's efforts to study Kohoutek. Maran believed that the comet initially had a perihelion farther out than the orbit of Jupiter until it was gravitationally perturbed by a passing star, lowering its perihelion to within the orbit of Mercury and its orbital period to 4–5 million years; additional gravitational interactions between the comet and the planets would have shortened the comet's orbital period further to about 75,000 years. The closest approach of Kohoutek to Earth occurred on 15 January 1974 and be no nearer than 0.8 AU (120 million km), preventing the resolution of its nucleus via Earth-based instruments.

Both the Minor Planet Center and the JPL Small-Body Database list Kohoutek as having a hyperbolic trajectory when it was near perihelion, but the orbit became bound to the Sun by 1978. The comet is not expected to return for about 75,000 years. Some of the meteoroids ejected by Kohoutek during its initial approach, particularly those with diameters no smaller than 0.2 mm (0.0079 in), were placed into stable orbits around the Sun.

As seen from Earth between 1973 and 1974, the comet took a southeastward path across the sky similar to Comet Halley's path between 1985 and 1986. The visibility of the comet was most favorable to observers in the Southern Hemisphere and the tropics. It was in the evening sky from the time of its discovery to the end of September 1973, after which the comet became a morning sky object. After being positioned in Hydra upon the time of discovery, Comet Kohoutek moved across the constellations of Sextans, Leo, Crater, Corvus, Virgo, Libra, Scorpius, and Sagittarius by the end of 1973. Kohoutek was near the boundary of Sagittarius and Ophiuchus during perihelion when it was visually separated from the Sun by only 0.5°. In 1974, the comet moved across the constellations of Capricorn, Aquarius, Pisces, and Taurus. As of 2022, comet Kohoutek is about 74 AU (11.1 billion km) from the Sun in the constellation of Gemini. It is currently receding from the Sun at 4.8 km/s (3.0 mi/s).

== Structure and composition ==
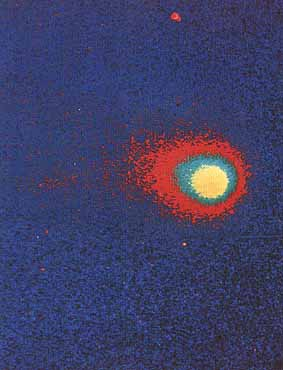
False-color image of Comet Kohoutek as photographed with a far-ultraviolet electrographic camera during a Skylab spacewalk on 25 December 1973

Kohoutek's highly eccentric orbit and possible lack of prior planetary or solar interactions suggest that the comet may have been a primordial body of either the Solar System or that it may have originated from another planetary system. The comet may have also originated from the Oort cloud. A 1976 analysis of photometry and water loss rates estimated that the nucleus had a radius of around 2.1 km (1.3 mi) and an albedo of around 0.67. A photometric analysis of Kohoutek, using Mercury as a reference, established an upper limit of 30 km (19 mi) for the diameter of Kohoutek's nucleus. An attempt to detect a radar echo from Kohoutek's nucleus using the Haystack Radio Telescope received no radar returns, constraining the nucleus's size to under 250 km (160 mi). The comet has a total absolute magnitude (at 1 AU) of 5.8 and a nuclear absolute magnitude of 9.5. During Kohoutek's 1973–1974 apparition, its tail's width ranged from around 30,000 km (19,000 mi) near the coma to 300,000 km (190,000 mi) farther away. Detection of positive carbon monoxide ions showed that the tail was at least 20 million km (12 million mi) in length. A more yellow and orange appearance of the dust tail of Kohoutek during its perihelion – as observed by astronauts on Skylab – was likely the result of light scattering by basaltic dust particles with sizes of around 0.5 μm. The tail lacked color closer to the coma near perihelion, indicating a large distribution of particle sizes and resulting in a white appearance. Observations from the Joint Observatory for Cometary Research in Socorro, New Mexico, were able to trace the blue ion tail of Kohoutek – featuring more prominently than the comet's dust tail – to a distance of 0.333 AU (49.8 million km) away from the nucleus. The ion density within the tail several million miles away from the nucleus was about 10 cm^{−3}, while the maximal electron density within the tail was around 20,000 cm^{−3}. At a distance of around 0.5 AU (75 million km) from the Sun, the plasma outflow in Kohoutek's tail generated a weak magnetic field with a strength comparable to the interplanetary magnetic field.

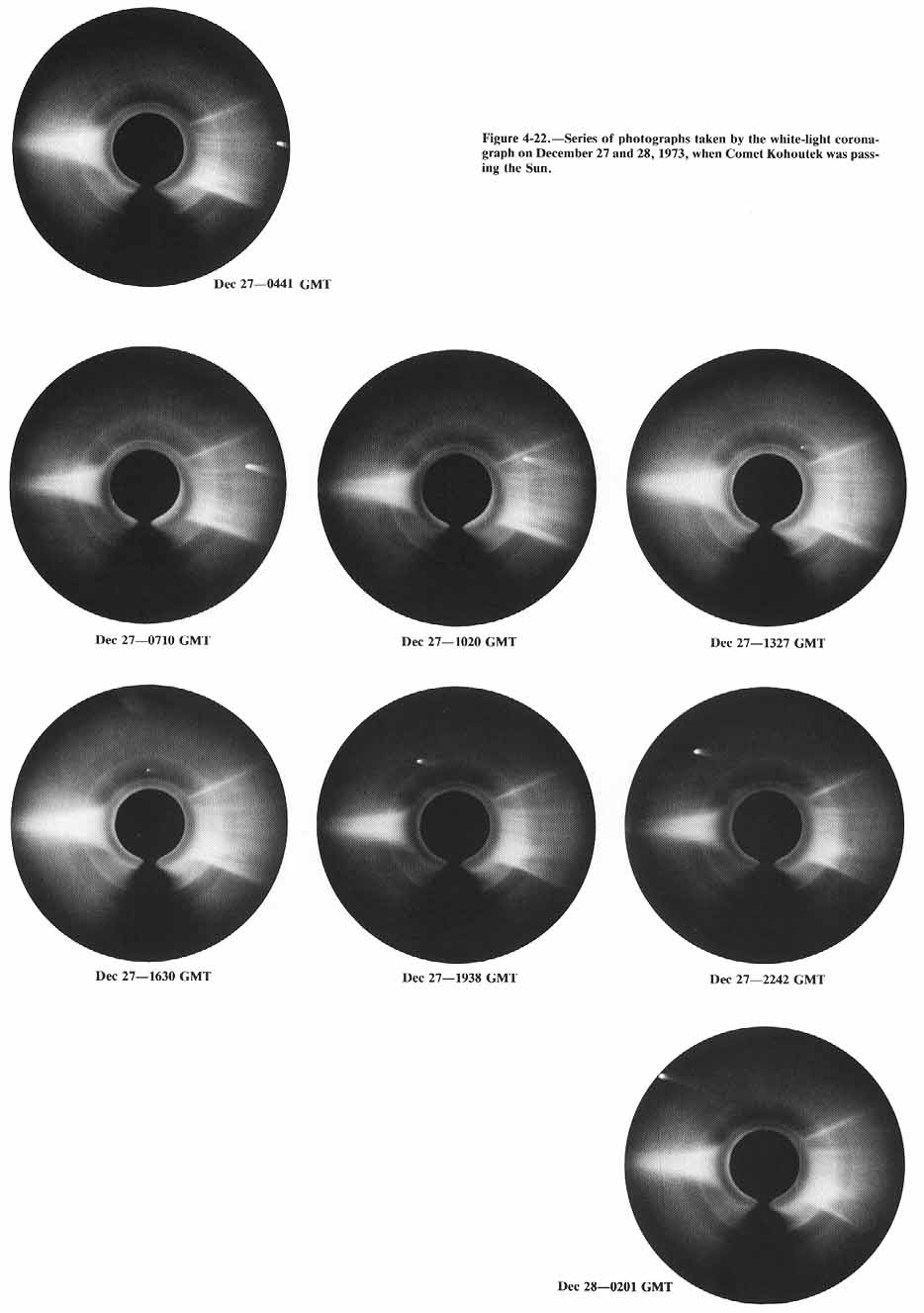
Sequence of images of Kohoutek at perihelion taken via coronagraph

Analyses of Kohoutek have provided different assessments of the scale of the comet's release of dust and gas, with some suggesting that Kohoutek is relatively dust-rich (and consequently gas-poor), and others suggesting that the comet is relatively dust-poor (and consequently gas-rich). Between 16 and 29 January 1974, the nucleus was expelling roughly 1,675 kg (3,693 lb) of gas and 16,000 kg (35,000 lb) of dust per second on average. The predominance of dust was thought to have been demonstrated by the emergence of an antitail when the Earth passed through the plane of Kohoutek's orbit; antitails are composed of relatively large solid particles that disperse around the nucleus. Particles in the antitail had radii larger than approximately 10 μm, while particle radii in the coma and tail were less than 1.0 μm. At a distance of 0.23 AU (34 million km) from the Sun, the less reflective material in the coma had an effective temperature of 720±20 K, while the material in the antitail featured effective temperatures of 565±10 K. Intense solar heating near the time of perihelion greatly reduced the size of particles in the antitail, leaving behind only particles with initial sizes of at least 100–150 μm and leading to a decrease in the antitail's brightness following perihelion. Silicates were also detected in the tail and antitail via infrared astronomy. On 2 December 1973, Kohoutek was expelling about 900 billion dust molecules per second. However, Kohoutek became less dusty following perihelion, with dust production lowering to around 30 billion dust molecules per second on 31 January 1974. This transition was also underscored by an increase in the gas-to-dust ratio of Kohoutek by at least a factor of 2 after perihelion. The change may have been enabled by the evaporation of ice-covered surfaces as Kohoutek drew closer to the Sun. The ejection of meteoroids during Kohoutek's approach and passage of the Sun added about 1.0 billion kg (2.2 billion lb) of mass to the zodiacal cloud. Smaller micrometeoroids were detected by the HEOS 2 satellite when it crossed the orbital plane of the outgoing comet around 9 June 1974, with the micrometeoroids being detected over the course of around 60 days surrounding the plane traversal; these micrometeoroids had masses ranging between 10^{−13} and 10^{−11} g.

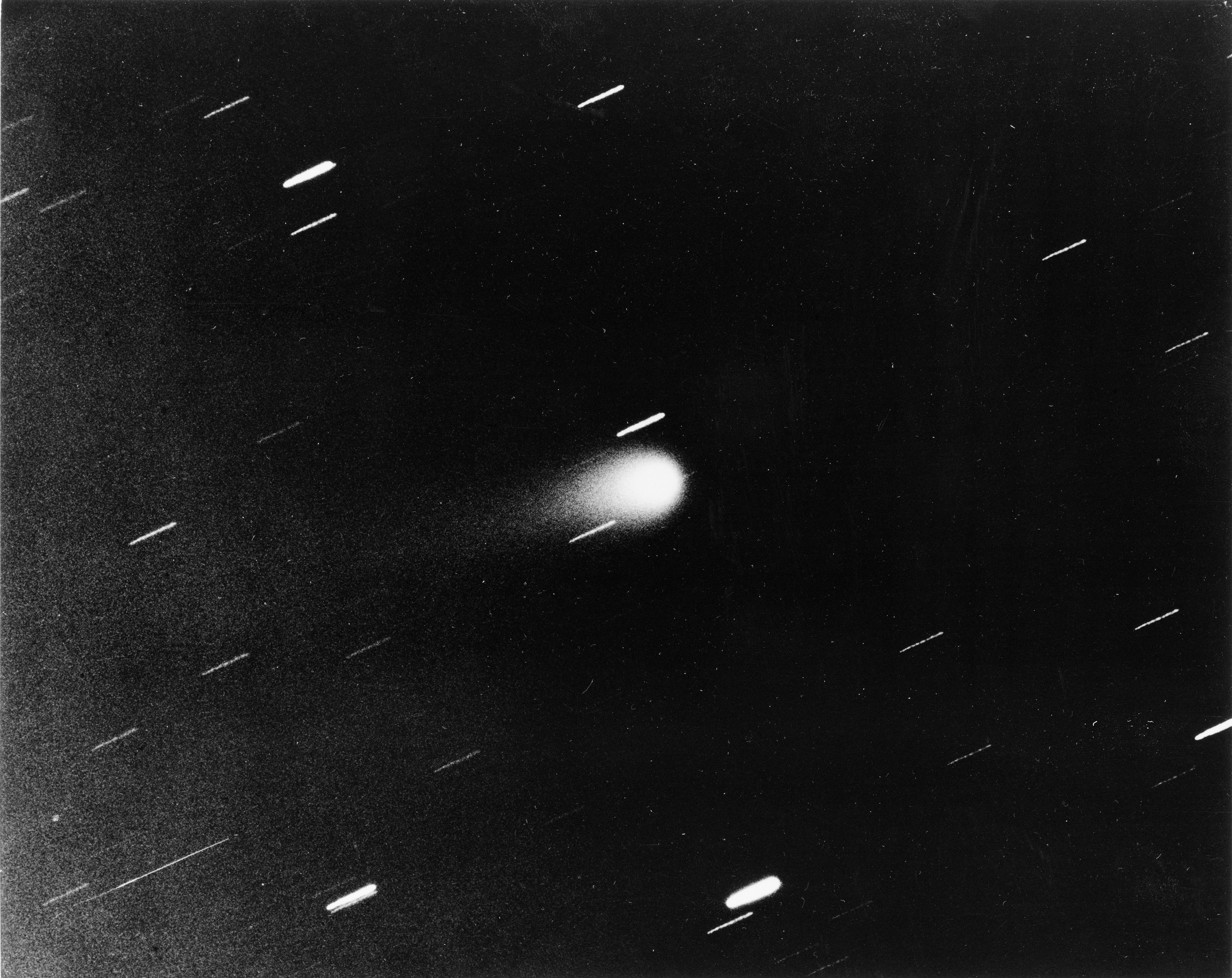
Kohoutek as seen from Skylab in December 1973

Later photometric analyses indicated that Kohoutek was a gassy comet with a high gas-to-dust ratio, emblematic of comets entering the inner Solar System for the first time, suggesting a nucleus rich in volatiles and relatively depleted in refractory substances. Analyses of Kohoutek's coma and tail in the near-ultraviolet found the roughly equal presence of hydrogen atoms and hydroxide, suggesting that these chemical species were once constituents of water. At a distance of 1.0 AU (150 million km) from the Sun, Kohoutek was losing roughly 1.0 million tons (0.9 million tonnes) of water per day. The mass of water lost between 60 days before perihelion and 60 days after perihelion, when Kohoutek would have been ejecting the most water, was approximately 64 billion kg (140 billion lb). The mass loss due to the ejection of water after perihelion was roughly half as much as before perihelion. The surface of Kohoutek's nucleus was likely covered in a mix of particles and water ice stored in clathrates. Much of this water was evaporated away as Kohoutek approached perihelion due to increased insolation, leaving behind only subsurface ices and smaller pockets of water on the nuclear surface. The uneven outgassing behavior of both water and other volatiles indicates that Kohoutek's nucleus likely has a heterogeneous composition and structure on scales of around 10 m (33 ft). Jets of vaporizing volatiles likely emanated from exposed areas where less volatile ices previously vaporized. Later analysis of spectrograms of Kohoutek provided strong evidence of the presence of the water cation (H_{2}O^{+}), particularly in the comet's tail. This chemical species was most likely the result of the photoionization of neutral water (H_{2}O) very near the nucleus.

Atomic oxygen and atomic carbon were also detected as the likely products of dissociating carbon monoxide or carbon dioxide from the nucleus. The nucleus also outgassed hydrogen at rates of up to approximately 4.5×10^{29} atoms per second at speeds of around 7.8±0.2 km/s. Due to the low mass of hydrogen and the weak gravitational pull of Kohoutek, the cloud of hydrogen surrounding the comet was of great extent, extending over 30 million km (19 million mi) across; the hydrogen cloud was thus larger than the disk of the Sun. Within the cloud, the ratio of deuterium to atomic hydrogen was at most 1.0%. The atomic hydrogen was later understood to be the product of the photodissociation of water ice present in Kohoutek's nucleus. The nucleus may also have been once covered by a roughly meter-thick layer of highly volatile substances that quickly outgassed when Kohoutek first approached the inner Solar System. Cyanide was first observed within Kohoutek's coma on 15 October 1973, while the comet was at a heliocentric distance of 1.8 AU (270 million km). The spectrographic signature of methyl cyanide at a wavelength of 2.7 mm was also detected in the nucleus of Kohoutek. Radio and microwave observations of the comet identified hydrogen cyanide, methylidyne radicals, and ethyl alcohol in addition to hydroxide and water. Other chemical species identified in the inner coma of Kohoutek included the amino radical, diatomic carbon, and sodium iodide. Emission signatures of tricarbon and nitrogen gas were also detected. Unlike in previously observed comets, the cyano radicals and diatomic carbon in Kohoutek's coma were not distributed spherically but instead elongated significantly away from the sun to distances of up to 10 million km (6.2 million mi).

== Observational history ==
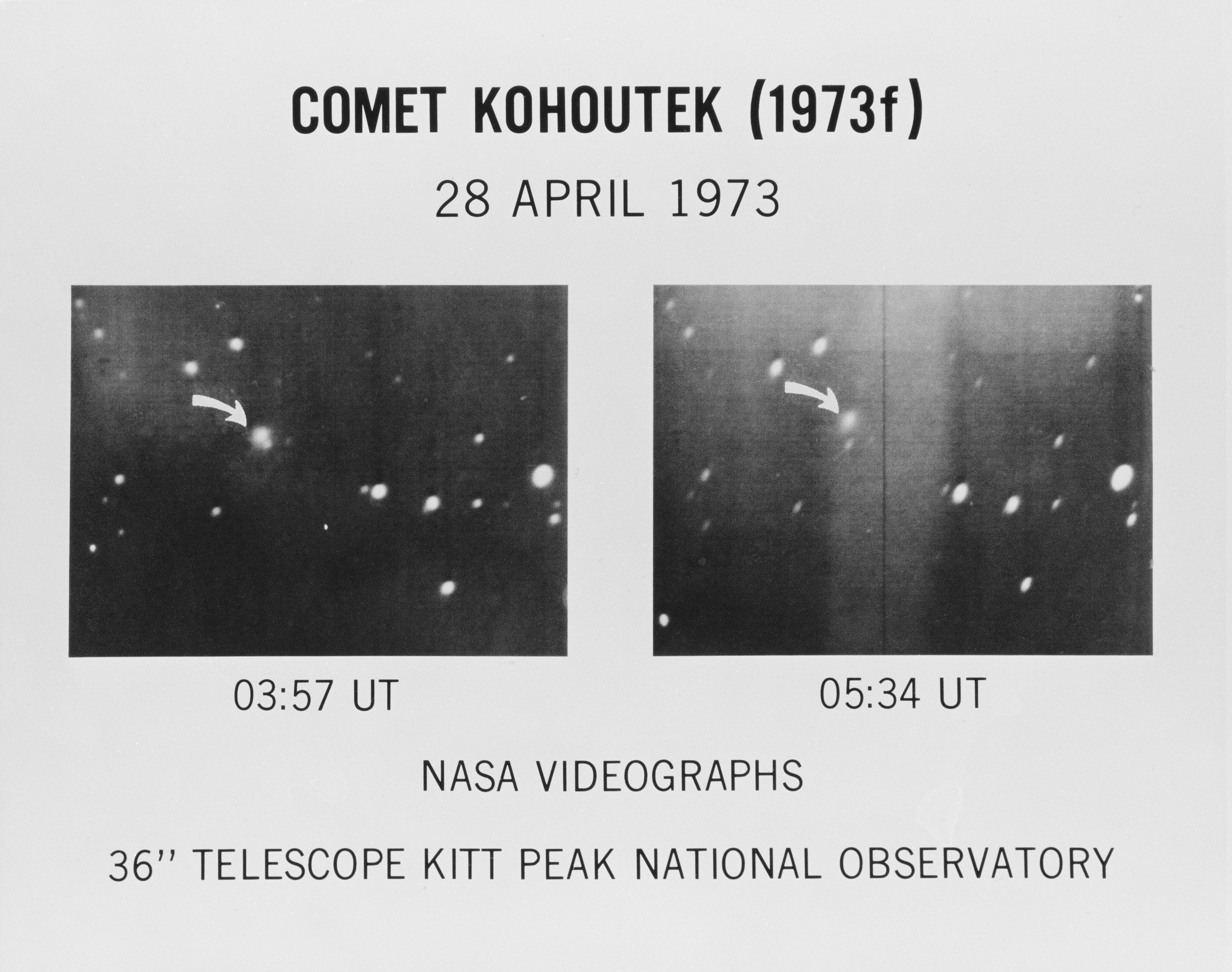
Kohoutek as seen from the Kitt Peak National Observatory on 28 April 1973

Following Luboš Kohoutek's discovery of his eponymous comet, additional photographic observations taken on 30 March and 2 April 1973 showed that the comet's coma was highly condensed and 20 arcseconds in diameter. The comet was last observed by Kohoutek on 5 May 1973 before it became too faint and unremarkable to observe or discern against the glare of twilight. At this stage, the comet's brightness was around magnitude 14. After several months of poor visibility, the comet was detected by Japanese astronomer Tsutomu Seki on 23 September; the comet's apparent magnitude had brightened to magnitude 11, but it remained a diffuse object. By the time the comet was recovered, it had neared to a distance of 2.2 AU (330 million km) away from the Sun. While the comet previously appeared as only a faint, featureless nebulosity, by late September a tail had become conspicuous, appearing first in a broad and fan-like form extending 2 arcminutes to the north. The coma grew to about 1 arcminute in diameter by mid-October 1973, as the comet brightened. By the end of the month, both the nucleus and a lengthening tail had become clearly apparent.

In November 1973, Kohoutek became bright enough to be visible to the naked eye. The ion component of the comet's tail was first noted on 21 November, accompanying the brighter dust component. The comet brightened to an apparent magnitude of 2.8 by 22 December 1973 before becoming indiscernible to ground-based observers due to Kohoutek's conjunction with the Sun; between 24 and 31 December the comet was within 10° of the Sun. During this period, the comet experienced a surge in brightness that – although not clearly observable from the Earth's surface – placed it in the echelon of great comets. Kohoutek was at its brightest during this period, becoming a roughly −3rd-magnitude object. Kohoutek was a much brighter object in the infrared, reaching magnitudes of at least −4.75 and −5.70 at wavelengths of 10 and 20 μm respectively. At its closest approach, the comet was visually separated by only around 0.75° from the center of the Sun. While the comet was too close to the Sun to be discernible from the ground, astronauts on Skylab and Soyuz 13 were able to observe the comet during its perihelion. The astronauts on Skylab noted that the comet was distinctly yellow and estimated that Kohoutek at its brightest was comparable to the magnitude −1.6 brightness of Jupiter. An antitail emerged during Kohoutek's close passage, stretching as far as 5–7° from the comet towards the Sun. The separate gas and dust tails typically seen on comets were not observed from Skylab; instead, the comet uniformly took on a yellow texture, transitioning to white and later to a mottled violet appearance. The strikingly yellow color of the comet at perihelion was due to the scattering of sunlight by sodium released by the comet.

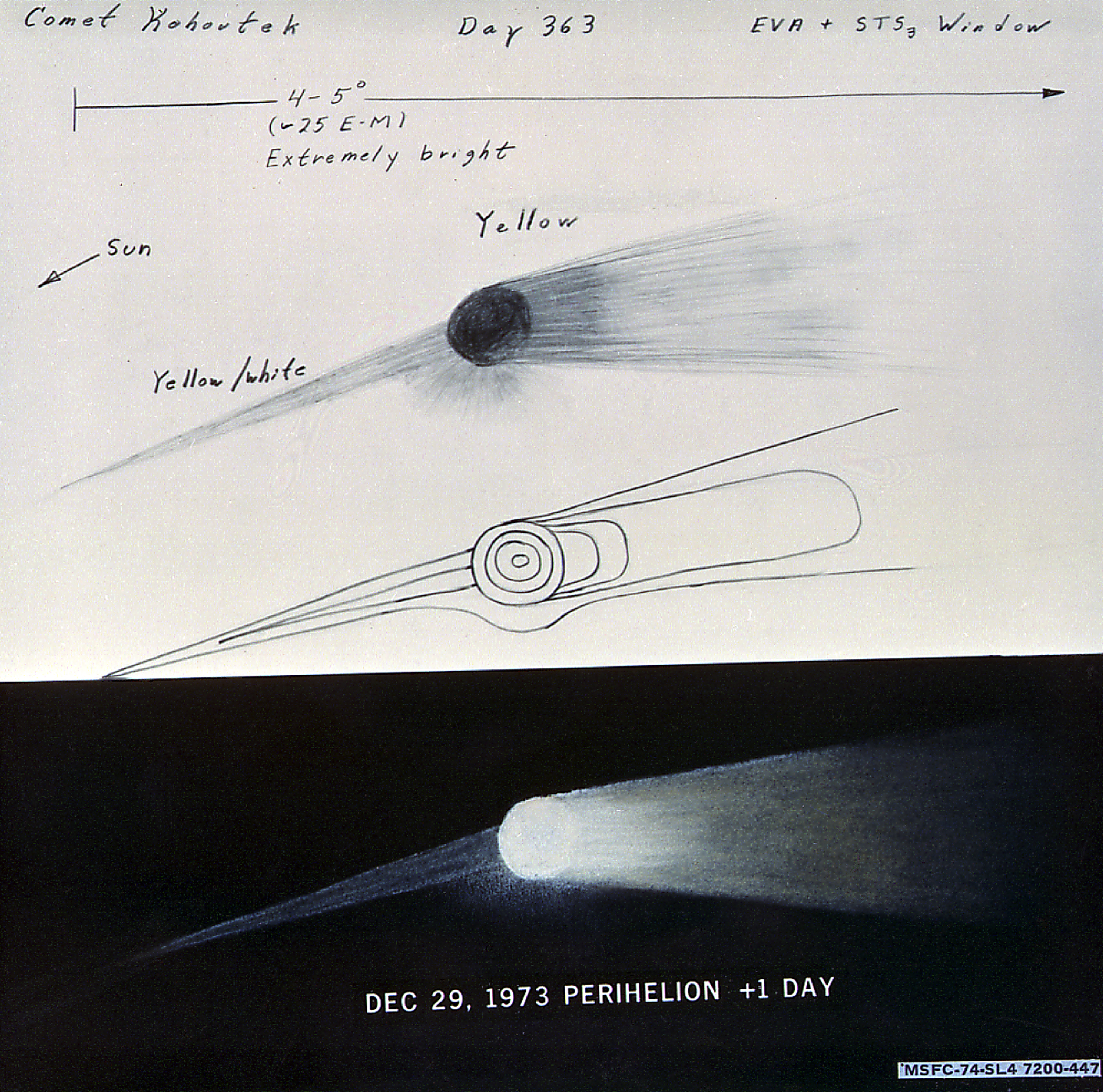
Illustration of Kohoutek on 29 December 1973 by Skylab 4's Edward Gibson

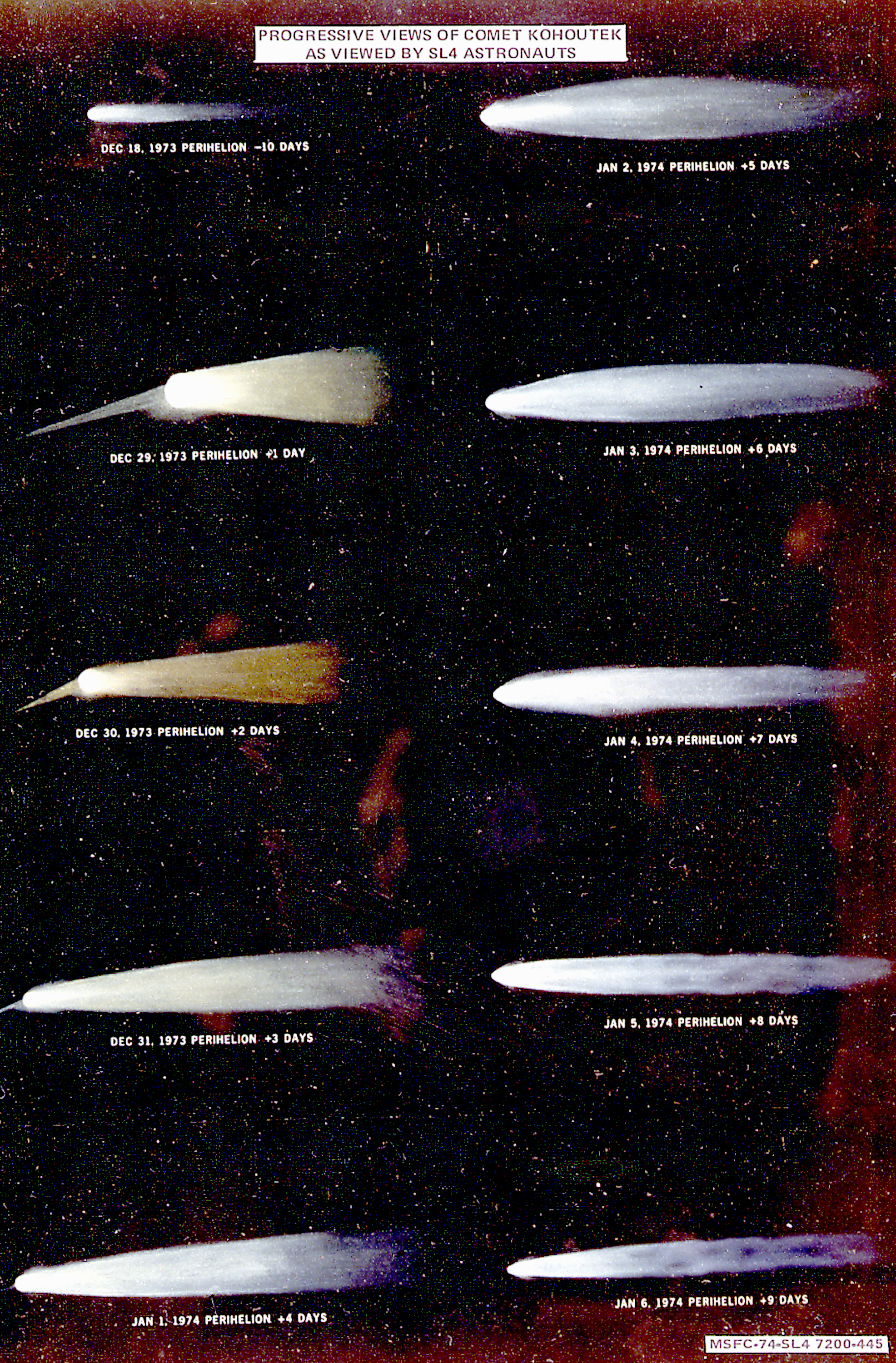
Progressive views of Comet Kohoutek as viewed by SL4 astronauts

I just finished taking the 233 photos and Kohoutek is not looking like our old, pretty, graceful-looking, blue-white comet any more. It's getting so close to the Sun now that the tail is fanning out; it's very short. I think I can't see the rest of the tail just because it's so light. But what I can see behind the comet now, the—the [coma] is getting quite large and bright, and the tail, all we can see is a fan behind it. And we're beginning to see some reds and some yellows in it.

— Gerald P. Carr, speaking to NASA Mission Control Center on 25 December 1973, Skylab Air-to-Ground Voice Transcription (Tape #MC1309/1)

Kohoutek once again became observable to ground-based observers beginning on 27 December 1973. For ground observers, the comet was at most a 0th- or 1st-magnitude object. By the time Kohoutek had reached a more favorable position for viewing by the general public, it had faded to around magnitude 2. Although the comet was dimmer than anticipated, it was nonetheless among the ten brightest comets as seen from Earth between 1750 and 1994. The comet rapidly dimmed following its perihelion on 28 December, diminishing to magnitude −1.5 on 1 January 1974 and reaching magnitude 4 by 10 January 1974. By the end of January 1974, Kohoutek was too faint to be seen with the unaided eye. The comet dimmed to around 10th magnitude towards the end of March 1974, after which it became too faint to clearly detect against the backdrop of the zodiacal light. Unlike on the comet's inbound trek, its appearance on the outbound trek was much more diffuse and nebulous. When the comet returned to the same distance from the Sun at which it was discovered, it was over 100 times fainter than at its first detection. The comet was last photographed in early November 1974 at a heliocentric distance of around 5.0 AU (750 million km) with an apparent magnitude of 22. At its greatest visual extent, Kohoutek's tail was well-defined and spanned 25° in length. In January 1974 its tail featured both a helical structure and a more irregular cloud-like structure about 0.1 AU (15 million km) away from the nucleus. Kohoutek's antitail spanned as much as 3° for ground observers; the antitail became more diffuse and dim following perihelion, making its visibility less favorable. A faint meteor shower seen on 1–3 March 1974, concurrent with Earth's closest pass of Kohoutek's orbit, may have been directly associated with Kohoutek.

== Brightness predictions ==
The light curve of Kohoutek plotted from ground-based observations (COBS), with the perihelion denoted by the red line. While initial predictions assumed the comet's luminosity would scale to the 4th or even 6th power of its heliocentric distance, its brightness on approach scaled more closely with the second power.

Kohoutek's anticipated close passage of the Sun and its pristine condition – having likely never approached the Sun previously – made the comet a candidate for becoming one of the brightest comets of the 20th century. Conventional wisdom held that the brightness of a comet was scaled according to the inverse fourth power of its distance from the Sun, and it was customary at the time to use this assumption in predicting the peak brightnesses of newly discovered comets. The value of the power (denoted n) would be repeatedly changed in subsequent estimates from the conventional value of 4, with estimates generally using values of n between 3 and 6. Kohoutek's distance at the time of its discovery meant that its intrinsic brightness could increase by more than a million-fold using these assumptions. While a more accurate estimate for the comet's ultimate apparent brightness – around magnitude −2.3 – could be derived from early observations, some of the first extrapolations of the comet's brightness using the initial photographic observations predicted apparent magnitudes as bright as magnitude −10 near perihelion; such a remarkably bright comet would be visible in daylight. Estimates later reached as bright as magnitude −12, comparable to the brightness of the full Moon. The high peak luminosity also implied ample visibility: early projections showed Kohoutek reaching naked-eye visibility in early November and then becoming as bright as Jupiter by mid-December, with increasing brilliance in January 1974 following its perihelion. Kohoutek was billed by the press as the "Comet of the Century" when these estimates were publicized. Fred Lawrence Whipple also remarked that the comet could "well be the comet of the century". Brian Marsden stated that "an object [as large as Comet Kohoutek] should achieve unusual brightness and produce an exceptional tail" with twelve weeks of naked-eye visibility, but also cautioned that "some very promising comets of the past [have] fizzled out". The Associated Press reported in early April 1973 that astronomers believed that the comet's approach "could be the most spectacular astrophysical event of the [20th] century".

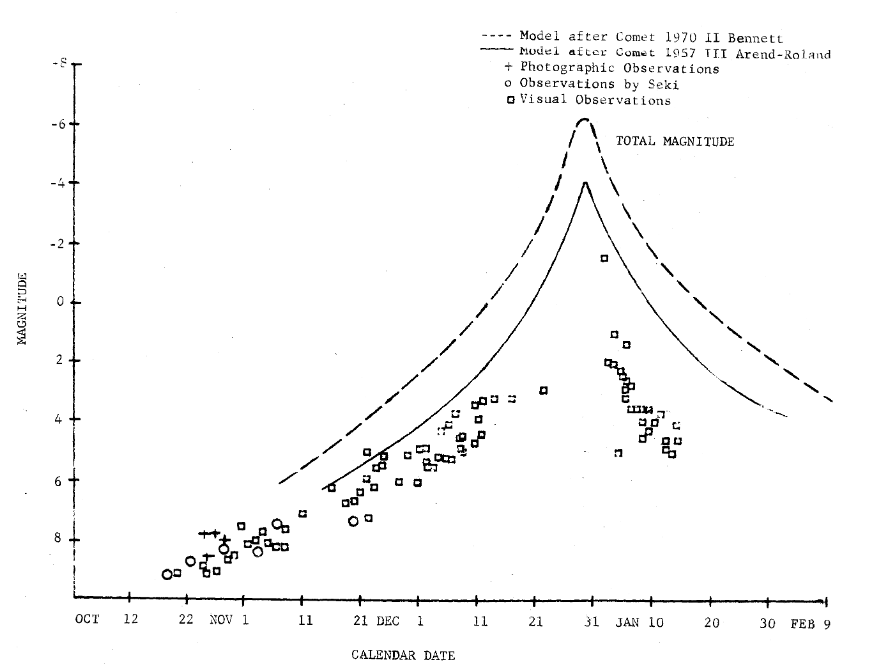
Kohoutek's brightness (observations plotted as points) fell short of predictions based on the light curves of past comets like Arend–Roland and Bennett (the solid and dashed lines respectively).

Although the most bullish predictions caught the attention of the press and the general public, some astronomers – like S. W. Milbourn and Whipple – were more uncertain and held that such predictions were optimistic. Regardless of its luminosity, the comet would be too close to the Sun to be seen by ground observers at its brightest. British Astronomical Association (BAA) circular 548, published on 25 July 1973, provided an alternative prediction of magnitude −3 for Kohoutek's peak brightness. Higher-end projections of Kohoutek's peak brightness remained as high as magnitude −10 into August 1973. An article in Nature published in the final week of September 1973 suggested that Kohoutek's peak brightness could have a greater than 50% chance of being within two magnitudes of −4. The National Newsletter accompanying the Journal of the Royal Astronomical Society of Canada in October 1973 estimated that Kohoutek would remain visible to the naked eye for four months bracketing perihelion. Brightness predictions were revised downward following the comet's behavior as perihelion approached. On 11 October 1973, BAA circular 549 provided a revised estimate of magnitude −4 for Kohoutek's brightest apparent magnitude. While still bright, such a brightness would yield only around ten days of clear naked-eye visibility for observers in the Northern Hemisphere. Publicized predictions of the comet were scaled back in November 1973. Although Kohoutek brightened by a factor of nearly a million by perihelion, sufficiently "to be a fine object for experienced observers when seen under ideal conditions in clear skies away from city lights" according to Whipple, its peak magnitude of −3 fell short of the most publicized projections and proved mediocre to the public eye; however, the comet's ultimate brightness was close to the published lower-end predictions. Whipple later quipped that "if you want to have a safe gamble, bet on a horse – not a comet".

Despite higher assumed values of n, the light curve of Kohoutek from 24 November 1973 to perihelion best fit n = 2.2 while its light curve after perihelion to 16 January 1974 best fit n = 3.3 or n = 3.8. The more optimistic use of n = 6 led to overestimates of Kohoutek's perihelion brightness by as much as a factor of 2800. The early brightness of Kohoutek around the time of its discovery may have been influenced by the intense outgassing of highly volatile substances; such volatiles may have been abundant in the nucleus if Kohoutek had never previously entered the inner Solar System. The degree of outgassing may have been enhanced by extremely porous outer layers of the nucleus that readily allowed the most volatile ices to vaporize at great distances from the Sun. In this model, the comet would have brightened quickly in the early stages of its solar approach, at about n = 5.78, before brightening more in line with shorter-period comets. The early burst would have led to inflated expectations for the comet's ultimate brightness. A separate study of long-period comets published in 1995 found that comets with initial semi-major axes greater than 10,000 AU (0.16 ly) brighten more slowly and less substantially before perihelion than shorter-period comets. Such comets are discovered at farther distances from the Sun than other comets as a result. It is now understood that Kohoutek's light curve preceding its 1973 perihelion was typical for comets with similar orbits.

== Observing campaigns and scientific results ==
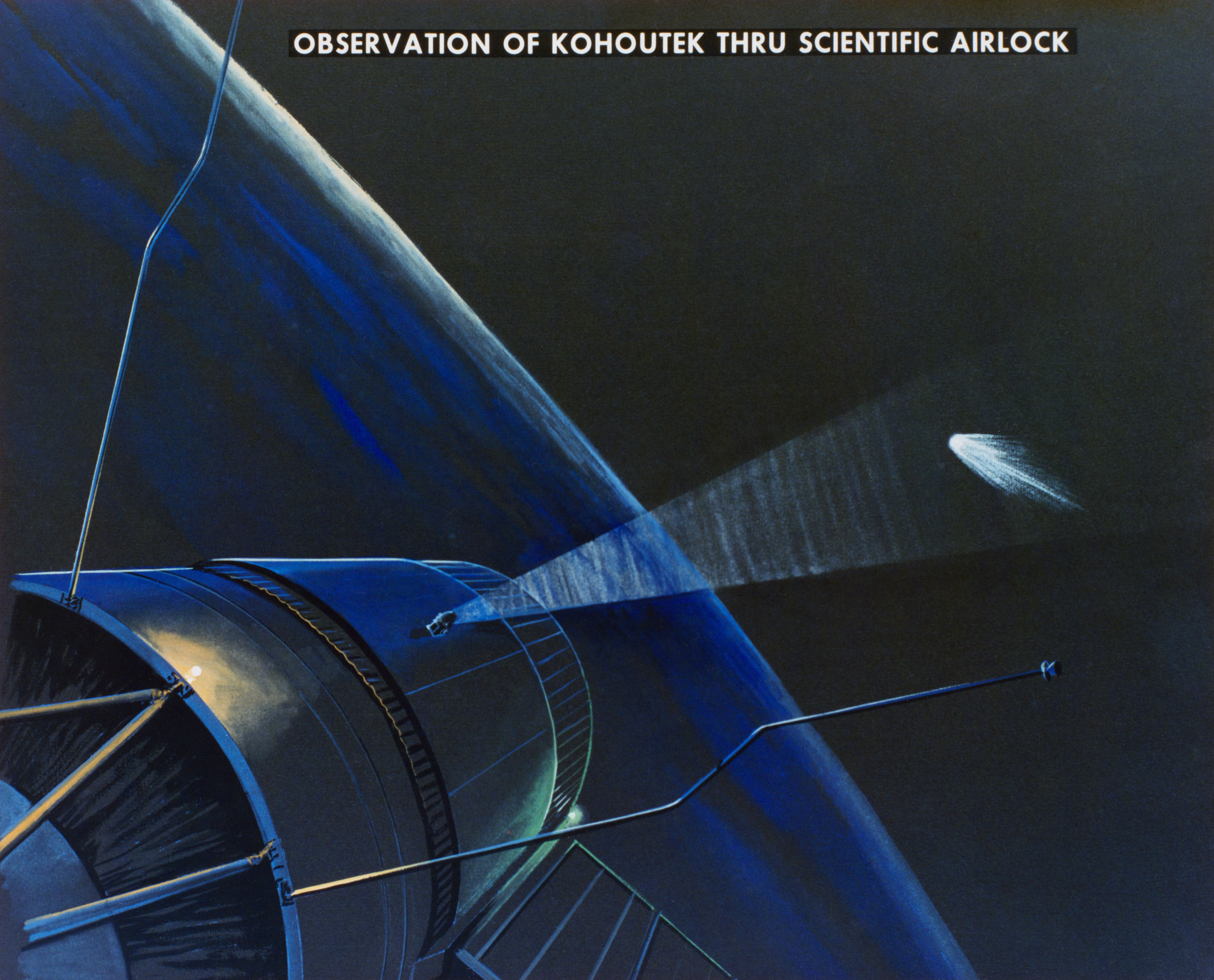
Artist's concept of Skylab 4 astronauts observing Comet Kohoutek via the space station's airlock

Kohoutek was the subject of intense scientific investigation and was observed over an unprecedentedly large range of the electromagnetic spectrum. Kohoutek represented the first time radio astronomy techniques were used to study a comet. The possibility that the comet could be entering the inner Solar System for the first time since its formation – making it potentially illustrative of the evolution of comets and conditions in the early Solar System – made it an attractive scientific target. The comet's exceptionally early detection, as well as the concurrence of its perihelion with Skylab 4, allowed for and motivated the coordination of Operation Kohoutek, a cometary observing campaign backed by NASA and involving a wide array of instruments and observation platforms. The resulting study of Kohoutek was in its time the most comprehensive and detailed of any comet; the scale of the international effort to observe the comet would not be surpassed until the 1986 International Halley Watch for Halley's Comet.

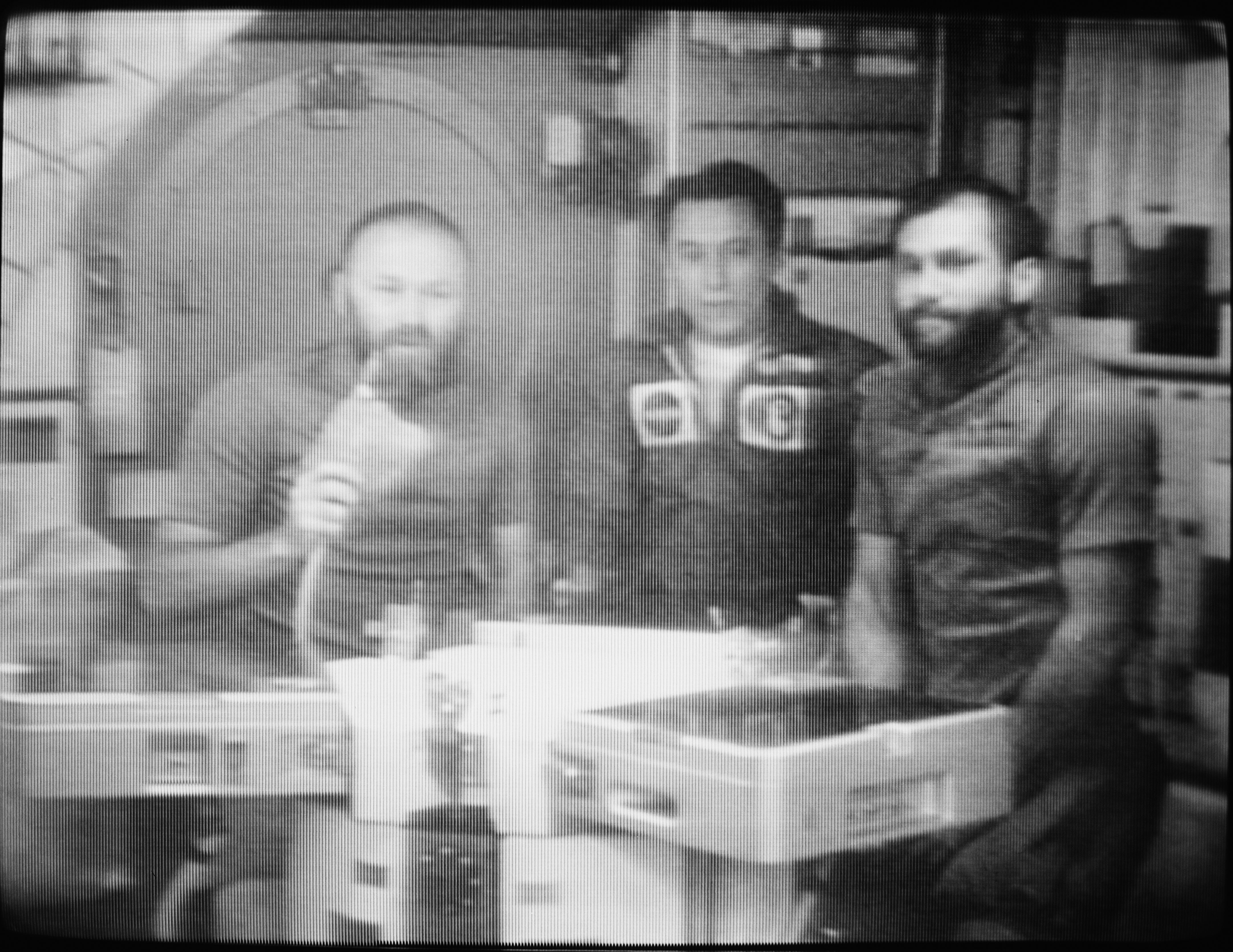
The crew of Skylab 4 discussing their observations of the comet via television on 28 December 1973

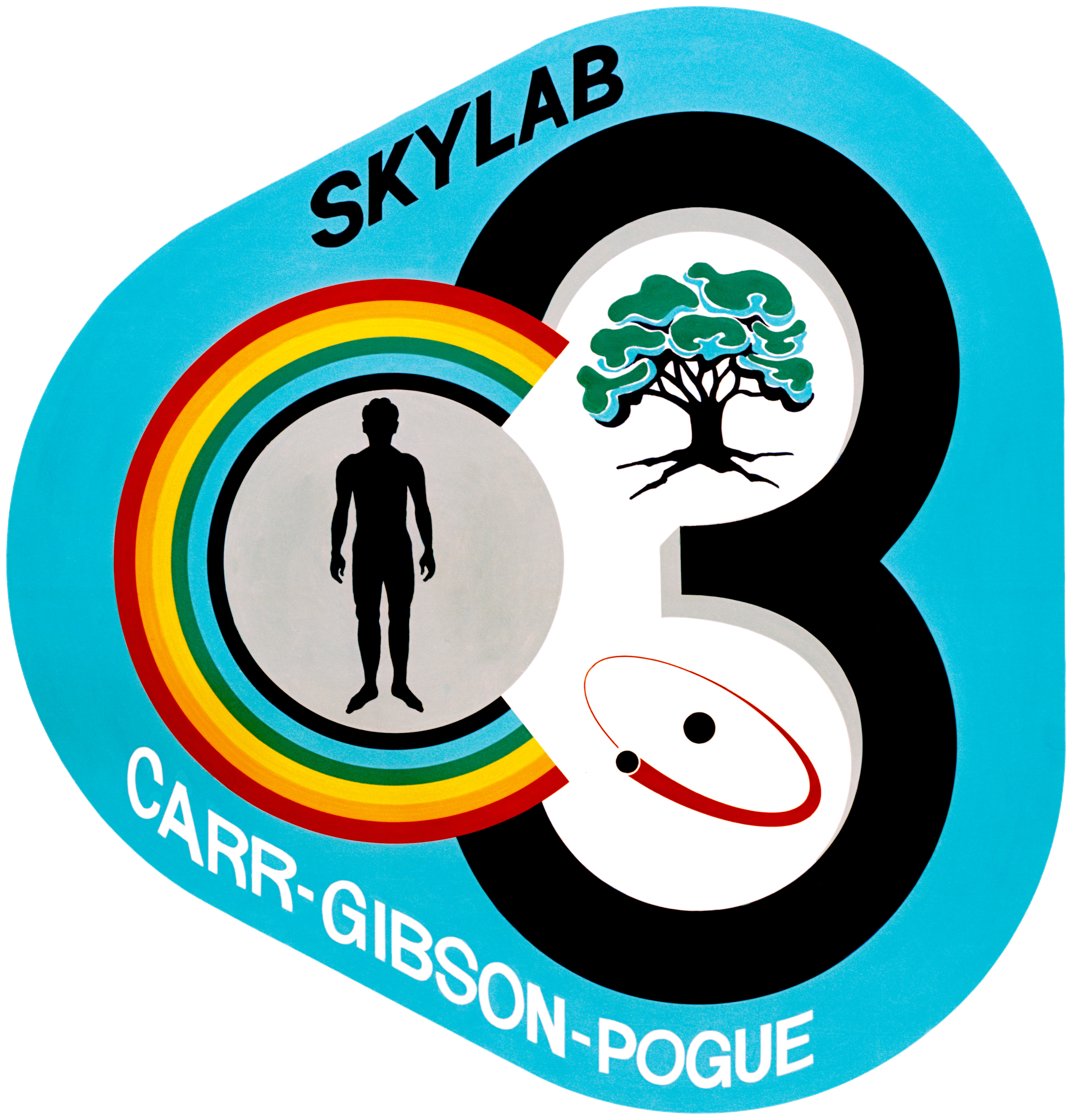
Skylab 4 emblem

Of particular interest were the molecular makeup of the comet and the dust in its tail. Many of the observations focused on the possible detection of water, which until Kohoutek had been never detected in a comet. While the presence of water in comets could be inferred by the identification of hydroxide and hydrogen constituents in previous comets, the prominent spectral signature of water in Kohoutek's tail was the first conclusive evidence that comets contained water. Observations also aimed to detect complex molecules in the comet; before Kohoutek, no molecule with more than three atoms had ever been detected in a comet. The detection of methyl cyanide in Kohoutek's nucleus was the first time such a molecule had been observed in a comet. It was also the first direct evidence of the hypothesis that comet nuclei harbored complex and stable chemical compounds (also known as "parent molecules") that sublimated or dissociated into the chemically unstable radicals and simpler molecules often identified in cometary spectra. Kohoutek also marked the first time that hydrogen cyanide was identified in a comet, supporting the hypothesis that hydrogen cyanide could be a parent molecule of the cyano radical previously detected in comets. The signature of silicon in infrared spectra of Kohoutek offered the first direct evidence of silicon in comets. The identification of a hydrogen cloud surrounding Kohoutek and its Lyman-alpha line signature validated earlier predictions that comets amass hydrogen. The low abundance of methane in Kohoutek and what Whipple described as "chemically ill-mated carbon molecules" suggested that comets were formed from the aggregation of compounds at low temperatures as opposed to the cooling of hot gases, possibly pointing to a larger role of the interstellar medium in providing the constituents of cometary compositions. Acetone, ammonia, and helium were not detected in Kohoutek despite searches.

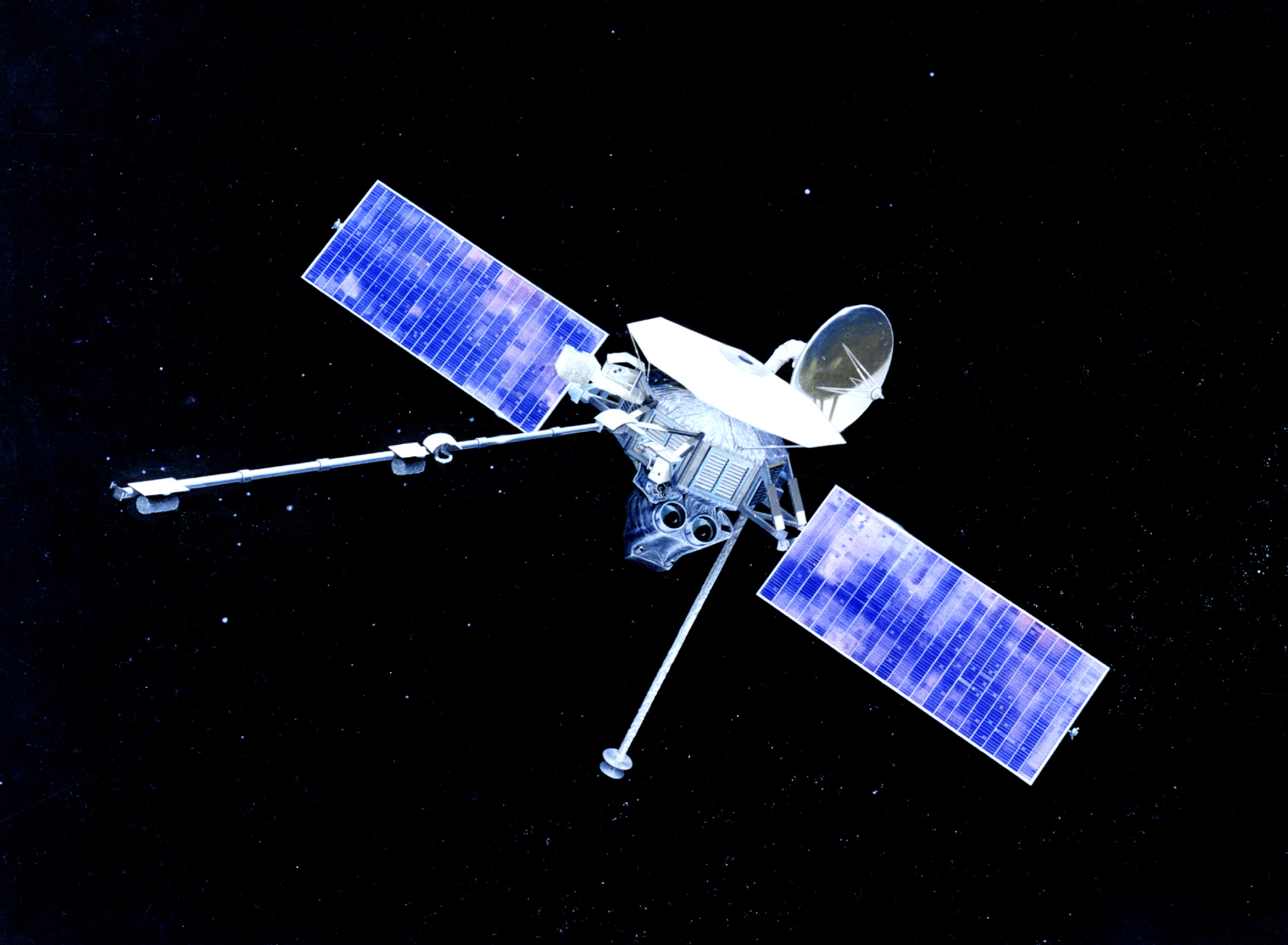
In observing Kohoutek, Mariner 10 became the first interplanetary spacecraft to observe a comet.

Skylab, the Orbiting Astronomical Observatory, the Orbiting Solar Observatory, ground observatories, and various sounding rockets were among the many observing platforms used to investigate Kohoutek during the comet's approach. Some resources in other projects under the auspices of NASA were redirected to study the comet. The newly built Joint Observatory for Cometary Research near Socorro, New Mexico, was made operational in time to observe the comet. In June 1973, NASA also briefly considered launching a spacecraft to intercept and investigate the comet via either a Thor-Delta or Atlas-Centaur launch vehicle but scrapped the proposal due to insufficient preparation time. Skylab 4 – the third crewed mission to the Skylab space station – was scheduled favorably for the passage and perihelion of Kohoutek. As a result, a substantial observation program targeting Kohoutek was appended to the original Skylab 4 mission, with the launch date selected due to scientific interest in the comet. The observation of the comet from Skylab was primarily conducted using instruments already on the space station, along with the backup of the Far Ultraviolet Camera/Spectrograph from Apollo 16. Due to Skylab's orbit around Earth, the comet could only be observed for at most 26 minutes at a time. When Kohoutek appeared closest to the Sun on 27 December 1973, Skylab instruments were trained on the comet almost continuously for 21 consecutive orbits. Mariner 10, en route to Venus, also made ultraviolet measurements of Kohoutek at a distance of around 0.7 AU (100 million km) in January 1974, making the comet the first to be observed by an interplanetary spacecraft. Although the comet's unexpected faintness prevented clear television images from being obtained by the spacecraft, Mariner 10's ultraviolet spectrometer nonetheless collected useful data concerning Kohoutek's hydrogen coma. Pioneer 6 and Pioneer 8 recorded data from within the comet's tail in 1974.

The results of the observations conducted as part of Operation Kohoutek were presented in June 1974 at a workshop held at the Marshall Space Flight Center. Comet science saw considerable advances as a result of the observational research conducted on Kohoutek, ushering in what Fred Whipple termed a "'renaissance' of cometary research". At the time, most scientists accepted Whipple's hypothesis that cometary nuclei were "dirty snowballs" made mostly of ices. However, there were other alternative models for comet nuclei, such as the "sand bank" model championed by British astronomer Raymond A. Lyttleton which considered nuclei as loose collections of dust particles with negligible amounts of ice. The detection and identification of various gasses emanating from Kohoutek validated the predictions of Whipple's model. Kohoutek's behavior led to the development of more detailed models seeking to explain the physical structure of comet nuclei. One proposal suggested that Kohoutek belonged to a subset of comets containing a non-volatile dust mantle around an icy volatile core. The occultation of the radio source PKS 2025–15 by Kohoutek's tail on 5 January 1974 also served as an opportunity to study interplanetary scintillation.

== Media coverage and viewing events ==
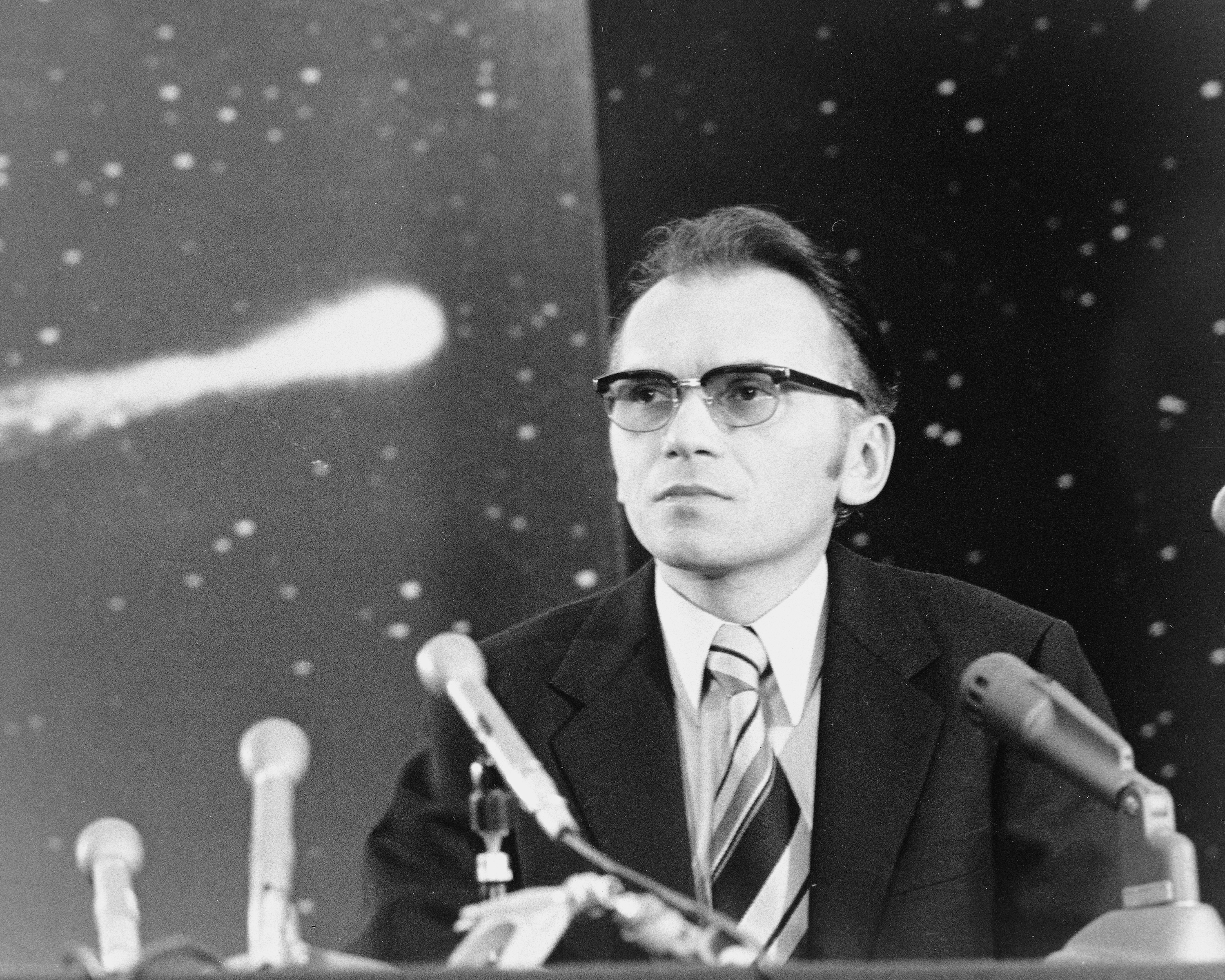
Luboš Kohoutek briefing the press on expectations for the comet on 5 January 1974

A hundred years from now, how will our great, great grandchildren remember 1973? In a future age, when the names of Nixon and Brezhnev are dimly remembered, and those of Ervin and Mitchell and Dean are minor footnotes in scholarly treatises, the name and the discovery that will illuminate the 1973 will be Lubos Kohoutek.

— William Safire, "Kohoutek's Comet", The New York Times (30 July 1973)

Kohoutek was in its time the most publicized comet aside from Halley's Comet. The media attention was brought about by a combination of factors, including the early predictions of its brightness, its passage concurrent with the Christmas and holiday season, the involvement of many observatories and powerful telescopes, and the possible effort of a crewed spaceflight mission – Skylab 4 – to investigate the comet. NASA also pursued an extensive public relations campaign that led to widespread coverage of the comet's approach in American newspapers in the final six months of 1973. Dale D. Myers, the Associate Administrator for Manned Space Flight at NASA, commented in July 1973 that "comets [of Kohoutek's] size come this close once in a century", further adding to the public interest. On the 30 July 1973 edition of the New York Times, columnist William Safire wrote that Kohoutek "may well be the biggest, brightest, most spectacular astral display that living man has ever seen". In August 1973, a reporter from The Mercury News in San Jose, California, wrote that researchers preparing to study the comet at NASA's Ames Research Center were calling Kohoutek "the comet of the century"; this honorific quickly became associated with the comet. NASA's decision to postpone the launch of Skylab 4 to support observations of the comet only further intensified public interest and added to the attention of the press towards Kohoutek after 16 August 1973. Despite more reserved and cautious statements from scientists regarding the comet's luminosity, stories referencing the more bullish and earlier estimates of Kohoutek's brightness continued to circulate as the comet drew closer, disregarding revised estimates. One edition of Time placed the comet on its cover. However, NASA spokespeople continued to relay an expectation that the comet would be a generational event. As November 1973 passed, newspapers began to more frequently convey the guarded skepticism that surrounded Kohoutek's brightness. Seizing the opportunity created by the comet in giving NASA good publicity, an adviser to NASA administrator James C. Fletcher proposed a half-hour television special featuring the comet, Skylab, and a Christmas message from the first family of the U.S. However, John Donnelly, the NASA Assistant Administrator for Public Affairs, derided the proposal because of its intertwining of politics with NASA. The proposal continued to be hotly contested within NASA but was eventually dropped. Although a spokesman for the Goddard Space Flight Center later stated that Kohoutek was a "roaring success" for science, "from a public relations point of view, it [was] a disaster".

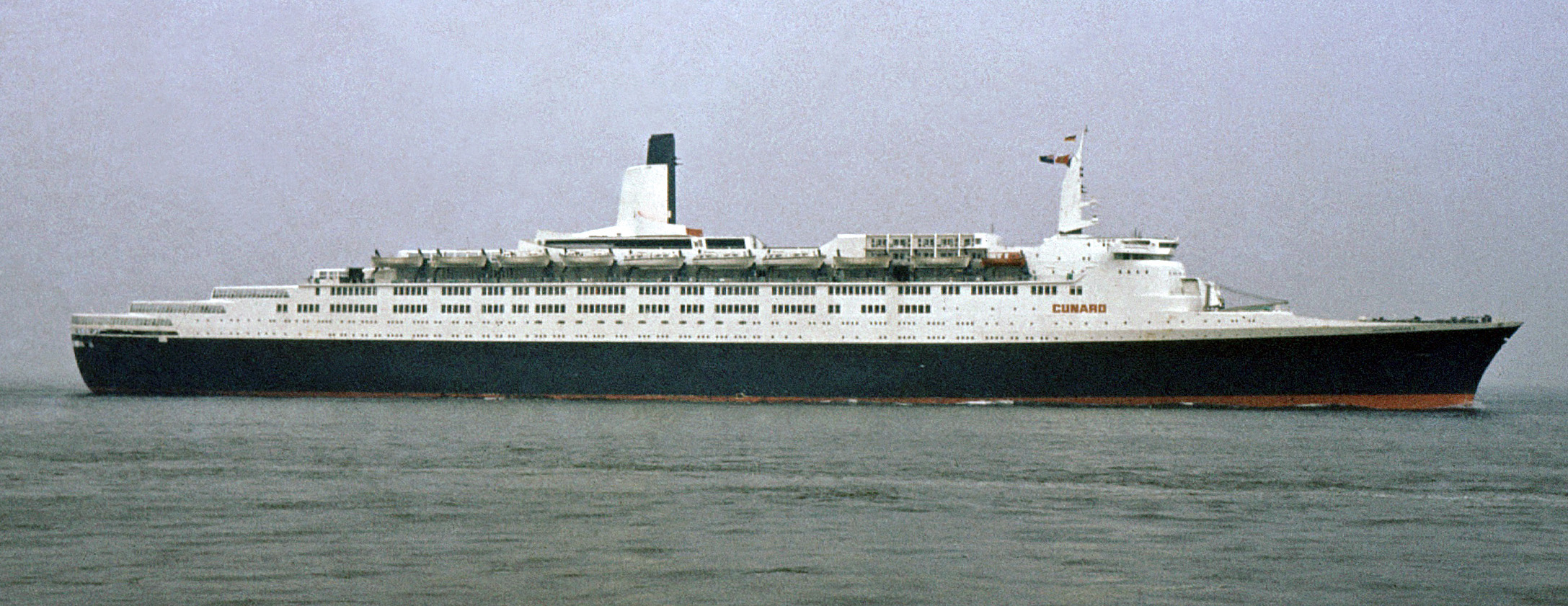
The Queen Elizabeth 2 (pictured in August 1973) sailed on a special three day cruise offering telescope views and comet lectures in December 1973

Queen Elizabeth 2 sailed on a sold-out "cruise to nowhere" dedicated to the comet from 9 to 12 December 1973, including guest of honor Luboš Kohoutek; Isaac Asimov and Kenneth Franklin were also present on the cruise. Astrophotography discussions and lectures discussing astronomy and the comet, led by scientists from Dowling College, were also held on board. Overcast and rainy conditions prevented views of the comet during the trek, which departed from New York and remained along the U.S. East Coast before returning to New York. In his final autobiography, Asimov later wrote that "even if it hadn't been [cloudy and rainy every night], Comet Kohoutek proved a colossal disappointment". Queen Elizabeth 2 later embarked on similar cruises in the Caribbean in January 1974, which afforded better views of the comet; Buzz Aldrin, Hugh Downs, Burl Ives, and Carl Sagan featured on the Caribbean cruises, with Hayden Planetarium director Mark Chartrand serving as the cruise's resident astronomer. The SS Rotterdam departed on a nine-day cruise beginning on 3 January 1974 to Puerto Rico and the Virgin Islands that was billed as a "Caribbean Comet Watch Cruise"; educational astronomy segments on the cruise were led by astronomer Lloyd Motz. Freelandia flew 149 of its members to Peru to view the comet in December 1973. Another chartered trip sponsored by the Hayden Planetarium to take passengers to observatories to view the comet was canceled. The American Automobile Association advised travelers to bring binoculars on roadtrips between December 1973 and February 1974 in anticipation of the comet's apparition. Planetariums throughout the U.S. launched comet-centered events and established hotlines offering information regarding Kohoutek. The William Miller Sperry Observatory at Union County College and the observatory on the roof of Boyden Hall at Rutgers University–Newark – both in New Jersey – made their facilities accessible to the public interested in the comet, with the former maintaining a phone line for updates on the comet.

== Cultural impact ==
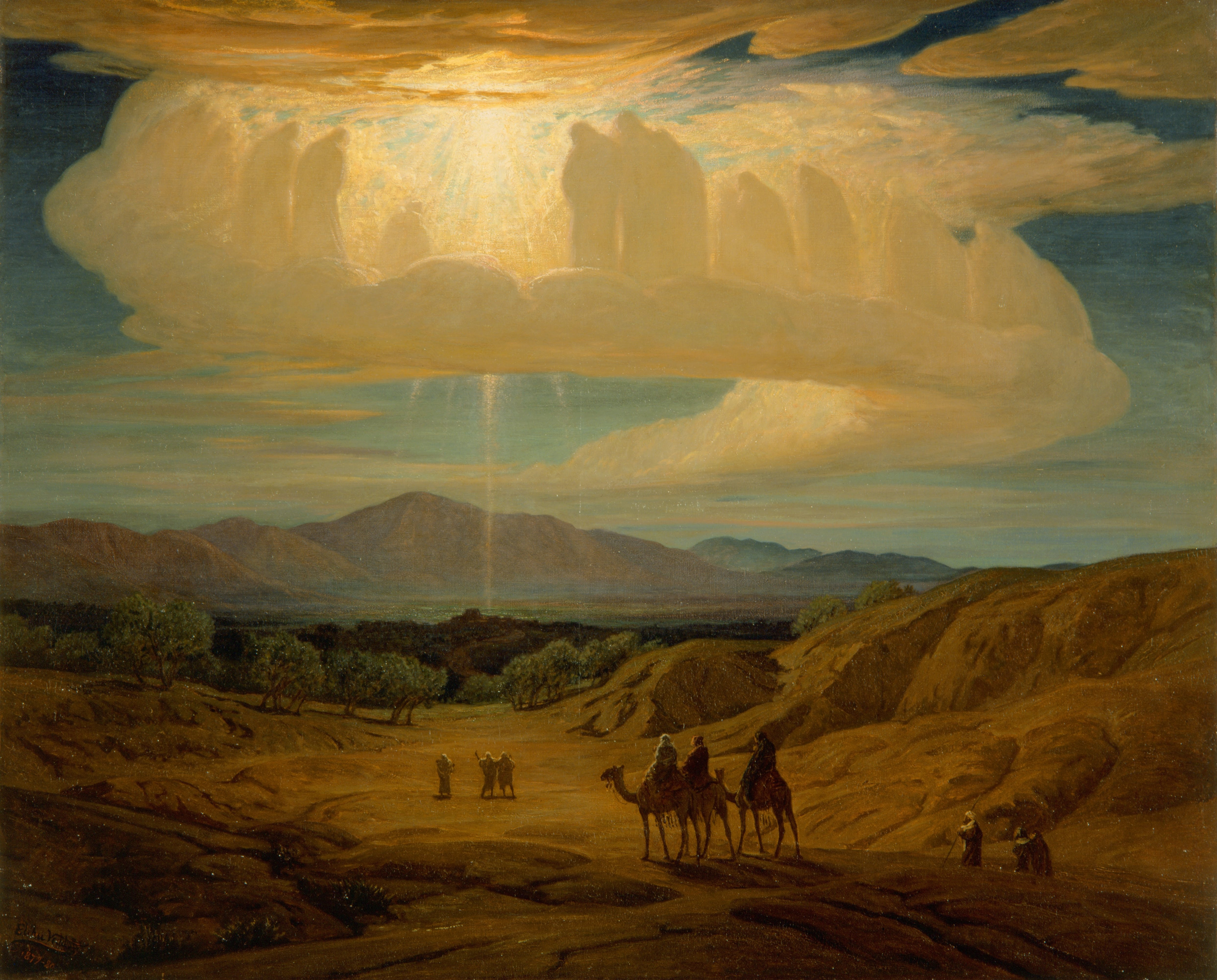
Kohoutek's anticipated brightness and apparition around Christmas was a spiritual significance in some religious fundamentalist circles.

It is among nonpatients that I have seen the most interest in the comet; in some instances the impact has already been profound. Many Christians have seen an umistakable link between the fact of Kohoutek's December 28 perihelion [...] and the Christmas observance. Some individuals have seemed to downplay the significance the event has for reasons of propriety or in the interest of appearing sensible. [...] A fair number of young adults have taken the comet to be some kind of sign, the significance to each individual varying with his specific religious or general spiritual outlook.

— Lawrence Weiner, letter to the editor, American Journal of Psychiatry (March 1974)

With predictions of Kohoutek's exceptional brightness being well-circulated, the comet became a cultural and media phenomenon by mid-summer 1973, leading to widespread cometary paraphernalia, apparel, and accessories. Sales of telescopes rose sharply leading up to the comet's anticipated appearance. Edmund Scientific Corporation reported a 200% increase in its sale of telescopes in 1973 relative to 1972. Sales for telescopes and binoculars quadrupled at Macy's after the company ran a seven-column ad in the New York Times. Interest in popular astronomy books also increased as the comet neared. Pinnacle Books published and quickly sold 750,000 copies of astrologer Joseph Goodavage's book "The Comet Kohoutek", which described the comet as a "harbinger of God". Astronomers appeared more frequently on television talk shows and were in greater demand as lecturers to speak on comets; Carl Sagan appeared on The Tonight Show Starring Johnny Carson to discuss the comet.

The timing of Kohoutek's visible apparition around Christmastide was of spiritual significance to fundamentalist Christians; in some circles, Kohoutek became known as the "Christmas comet". It renewed interest in the nature of the Star of Bethlehem, including the idea that the event may have been a comet. Some fundamentalist Protestants interpreted the comet as a harbinger of the Second Coming. Radio preacher Carl McIntire stated that the comet was "so beyond anything men have ever seen before" and that "only the Holy Scripture [offered] anything to explain it". Kohoutek also took on spiritual significance in the New Age movement and other followers of Western esotericism. One view was that the comet heralded a new cosmic age – the "age of Kohoutek". Proponents of this view organized the Kohoutek Celebration of Consciousness at the Bill Graham Civic Auditorium in San Francisco in January 1974. For some, the comet's arrival was a portent of disaster. In 1973, David Berg, founder of the Children of God, predicted that Comet Kohoutek foretold a colossal doomsday event in the United States by the end of January 1974 because of divine judgment and "America's wickedness". Some of the movement's followers intended to leave the U.S. in response to the impending comet. There were other circulated fringe claims predicting that the comet would cause mass hysteria or spell death for humanity by igniting the global oil supply.

Because Kohoutek fell far short of expectations, its name became synonymous with spectacular disappointment. Russell Baker described the comet as "the biggest flopperoo since 'Kelly' hit Broadway" and "the Edsel of the firmament", among other witty metaphors. While newspapers had been touting the comet's brightness for the latter half of 1973, the anticlimactic display led to satirical and parodical reporting following Kohoutek's passage. For instance, the Chicago Tribune featured a satirical article linking the optimistic brightness predictions to an effort to distract the public from the Watergate scandal or to a conspiracy to boost telescope sales. The widely circulated inaccurate projections came during a time of increasing distrust of the sciences that Time termed a "deepening disillusionment". Mainstream media shied away from extensive coverage of comets following Kohoutek; despite Comet West becoming bright enough to be visible in daylight in March 1976, West received little attention from the press compared to the media frenzy that preceded Kohoutek. Though astronomers and the sciences received backlash due to the comet's underwhelming performance, much of the general public's disdain was also directed towards astrologers and cultists who ascribed a transcendental significance to the comet's apparition.

In response to the disappointing display from the comet, students at Pitzer College organized the Kohoutek Music and Arts Festival in January 1974, which became an annual event featuring various musical artists. Several music albums and songs released in the 1970s and 1980s were dedicated to or named after Kohoutek, such as "Kohoutek" first performed in public by Journey on New Year's Eve 1973 and later recorded on their eponymous debut album (released in 1975). Sun Ra played a concert at The Town Hall in New York dedicated to Kohoutek's arrival on 22 December 1973. Other musical groups with works influenced by the comet included Kraftwerk, Pink Floyd, Argent, R.E.M., and Weather Report. The funk band Father's Children have a track on their album Who's Gonna Save the World named after the comet. References to Kohoutek permeated other forms of popular media, such as in the comic strip Peanuts over a week-long period, in the sitcom El Chavo del Ocho, and a poem by Jaime Sabines.

In The Defenders #15 (September 1974), the Comet Kohoutek is mentioned as having freed Magneto from imprisonment within the Earth's core. In The Simpsons season-6 episode "Bart's Comet", Principal Skinner mentions that he previously had the sighting of a comet stolen from him by a "Principal Kohoutek", who he would bitterly take his revenge on, stating: "I got him back though, him and that boy of his."

== See also ==
- Comet ISON – sungrazing comet that disintegrated upon passing close to the Sun in 2013
- C/1989 X1 (Austin) – fell short of brightness predictions in spring 1990
- Comet Ikeya–Seki – one of the brightest comets on record
- Oort cloud
- Interstellar object
