= 2384 Schulhof =

Asteroid

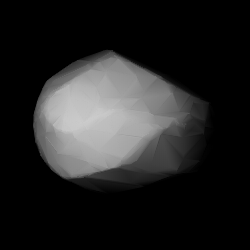
- Shape model of Schulhof from its lightcurve

Discovery
- Discovered by: M. Laugier
- Discovery site: Nice Obs.
- Discovery date: 2 March 1943

Designations
- Named after: Lipót Schulhof (Hungarian astronomer)
- Alternative designations: 1943 EC_{1} · 1943 GV; 1960 FE · 1962 WL_{1} 1970 RP · 1981 FF; A909 BF
- Minor planet category: main-belt · (middle); Schulhof

Orbital characteristics
- Epoch 23 March 2018 (JD 2458200.5)
- Uncertainty parameter 0
- Observation arc: 108.97 yr (39,803 d)
- Aphelion: 2.9231 AU
- Perihelion: 2.2989 AU
- Semi-major axis: 2.6110 AU
- Eccentricity: 0.1195
- Orbital period (sidereal): 4.22 yr (1,541 d)
- Mean anomaly: 256.37°
- Mean motion: 0° 14^{m} 0.96^{s} / day
- Inclination: 13.530°
- Longitude of ascending node: 7.9084°
- Argument of perihelion: 205.72°

Physical characteristics
- Mean diameter: 11.485±0.174 km 11.721±0.138 km 12.66 km (calculated)
- Synodic rotation period: 3.294±0.006 h
- Geometric albedo: 0.21 (assumed); 0.2733±0.0217; 0.280±0.045
- Spectral type: S (assumed)
- Absolute magnitude (H): 11.7; 11.8

2384 Schulhof (prov. designation: 1943 EC_{1}) is a mid-sized asteroid and the namesake of the Schulhof family, located in the Eunomian region of the intermediate asteroid belt. It was discovered on 2 March 1943, by French astronomer Marguerite Laugier at Nice Observatory in southeastern France. The asteroid was later named after Hungarian astronomer Lipót Schulhof. The presumed S-type asteroid has a short rotation period of 3.3 hours and measures approximately 12 kilometers (7.5 miles) in diameter.

== Orbit and classification ==
Schulhof is the principal body and namesake of the Schulhof family, a small asteroid family within the region of the Eunomia family of the main-belt. It orbits the Sun in the central asteroid belt at a distance of 2.3–2.9 AU once every 4 years and 3 months (1,541 days). Its orbit has an eccentricity of 0.12 and an inclination of 14° with respect to the ecliptic. It was first observed as A909 BF at Heidelberg Observatory in 1909. The body's observation arc begins with its official discovery observation at Nice in 1943.

== Naming ==
This minor planet was named in memory of Austrian–Hungarian astronomer Lipót Schulhof (1847–1921), observer of asteroids and comets, discoverer of the main-belt asteroid 147 Protogeneia, and awardee of the Lalande Prize. The official naming citation was published by the Minor Planet Center on 17 February 1984, based on a suggestion by Brian G. Marsden (M.P.C. 8541).

== Physical characteristics ==
Schulhof is an assumed S-type asteroid.

=== Rotation period ===
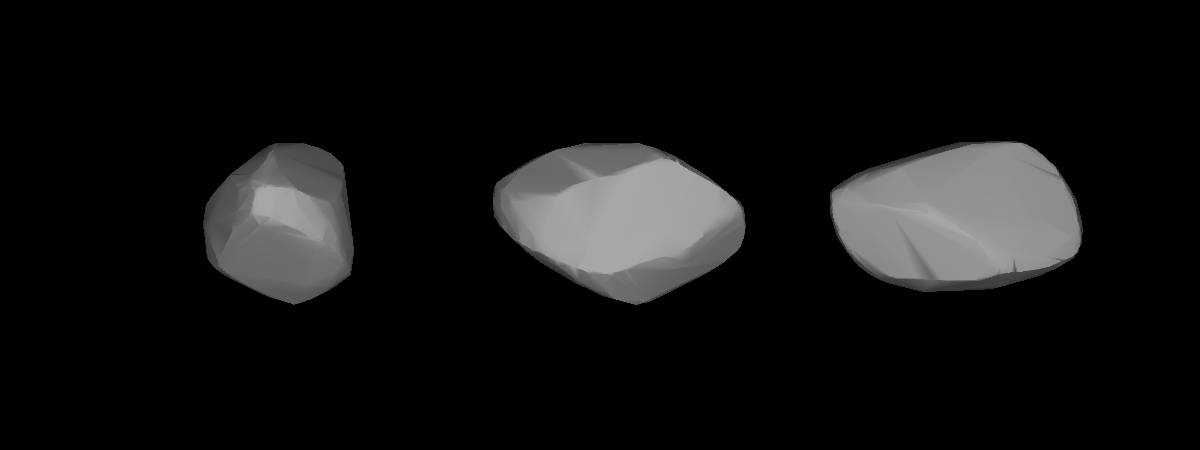
Lightcurve-based 3D-model of Schulhof

In April 2002, a rotational lightcurve of Schulhof was obtained from photometric observations at the U.S. Oakley Observatory. It gave a well-defined rotation period of 3.294±0.006 hours with a brightness variation of 0.43 magnitude (U=3).

=== Diameter and albedo ===
According to the survey carried out by the NEOWISE mission of NASA's Wide-field Infrared Survey Explorer, Schulhof measures 11.5 and 11.7 kilometers in diameter and its surface has an albedo of 0.27 and 0.28, respectively. The Collaborative Asteroid Lightcurve Link assumes an albedo of 0.21 – derived form 15 Eunomia, the family's largest member and namesake – and calculates a diameter of 12.7 kilometers with an absolute magnitude of 11.8.
