= Stephan Ulamec =

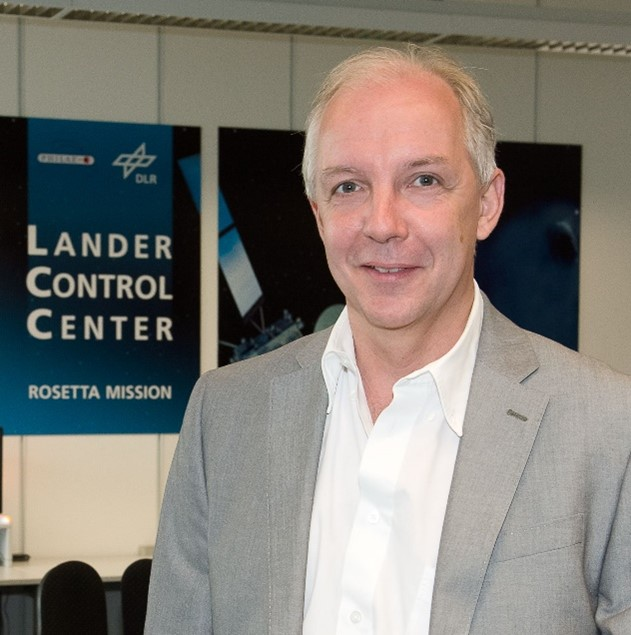
- Ulamec in 2015
- Born: Salzburg, Austria
- Known for: Exploration of small bodies in the solar system
- Awards: Sir Arthur Clark Award, 2014; Wernher von Braun Honour, 2015
- Scientific career
- Fields: Geophysics
- Workplaces: Microgravity User Support Center (MUSC), Space Operations and Astronaut Training, German Space Agency (DLR)
- Thesis: Acoustic and Electrical Methods for the Exploration of Atmospheres and Surfaces, with Application to Saturn's Moon Titan (1991)
- Website: https://www.dlr.de/rb/en/desktopdefault.aspx/tabid-4535/

Stephan Ulamec (born 1966) is an Austrian geophysicist who participated in several space missions. He is working at the German Aerospace Center (Deutsches Zentrum für Luft- und Raumfahrt, DLR) in Cologne. He is regularly giving lectures about his publications in aerospace engineering at the University of Applied Sciences: Fachhochschule FH-Aachen. Main aspects of his work are related to the exploration of small bodies in the Solar System (asteroids and comets).

== Early life and education ==
Ulamex was born in Salzburg on January 27, 1966.

Ulamec studied geophysics at the Karl-Franzens University in Graz (Austria) as student of Prof. Siegfried J. Bauer. He finished his PhD on "Acoustic and Electrical Methods for the Exploration of Atmospheres and Surfaces, with Application to Saturn's Moon Titan" in 1991.

== Career ==
From 1991 till 1993 he worked as a research fellow at the European Space Agency (ESA), specifically at European Space Research and Technology Centre (ESTEC) in Noordwijk, in The Netherlands. Since 1994, he is at the Microgravity User Support Center (MUSC) which is part of the DLR Space Operations and Astronaut Training (SOAT). He has made several presentations at the International Astronautical Congress (IAC).

== Involvement in space missions ==
=== Mission to 67P/Churyumov-Gerasimenko ===
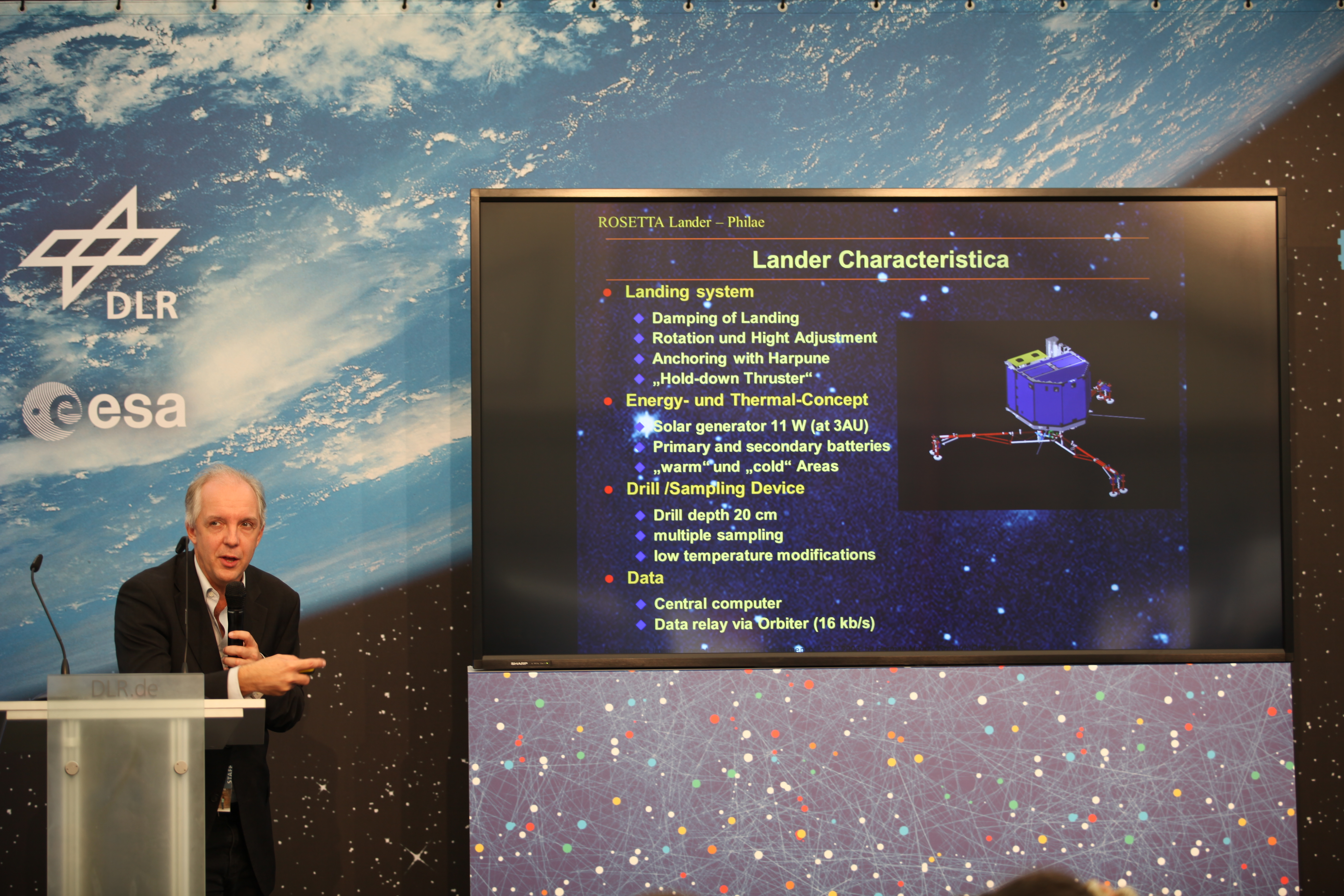
"Philae will land on a comet in 2014. Preparations for this are already in full swing," says Stephan Ulamec in September 2013.

Stephan Ulamec has been the project manager of the Rosetta lander Philae, which successfully landed on comet 67P/Churyumov-Gerasimenko in 2014.

=== Mission to (162173) Ryugu ===
He has also been Payload Manager of MASCOT, a lander made in common by the French space agency (CNES) and the DLR, that has been delivered by the JAXA Hayabusa2 spacecraft to asteroid (162173) Ryugu in 2018.

=== Mission to Phobos (MMX, IDEFIX) ===
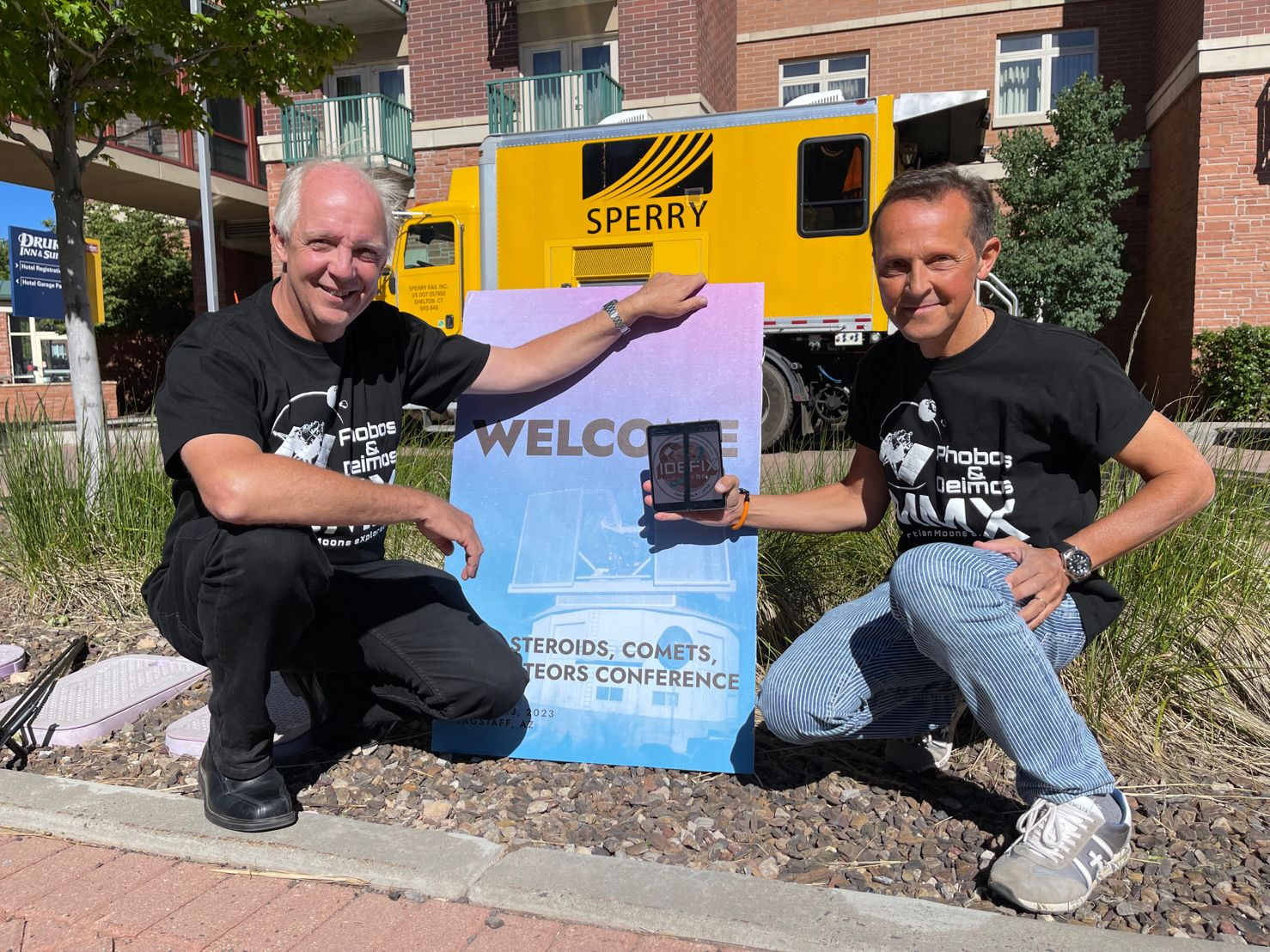
Stephan Ulamec and Patrick Michel on 21 June 2023 in Flagstaff, Arizona (USA) during a break at the Asteroid, Comet, Meteor (ACM) Conference, celebrating the naming of IDEFIX©, the JAXA's MMX mission DLR CNES rover, as its two Co Principal Investigators.

He is one of two lead scientists (Co Principal Investigator) of the French-German MMX rover called Idefix, together with Dr Patrick Michel. This rover is to be launched in 2026 by the Japanese Mars Moons eXploration (MMX), a JAXA (Japan Aerospace eXploration Agency) mission to the Mars natural satellite Phobos.

=== Mission to (65803) Didymos ===
Ulamec is also part of the Science Management Board for the ESA Hera mission, launched in 2024 with a SpaceX Falcon 9 rocket, aimed at operating a rendezvous and characterising in details the asteroid (65803) Didymos and its natural satellite Dimorphos, and also analysing the artificial impact created by the American space agency NASA probe DART in September 2022.

== Involvement in other projects and working groups ==
=== NEO-MAPP ===
He is involved in NEO-MAPP, a European Union Horizon 2020 project to study mitigation and characterisation techniques for potentially hazardous asteroids.

=== SSEWG and SSAC ===
From January 2020 till December 2023, he is chairing the ESA Solar System and Exploration Working Group (SSEWG) and is a member of the Space Science Advisory Committee (SSAC).

== Writings ==
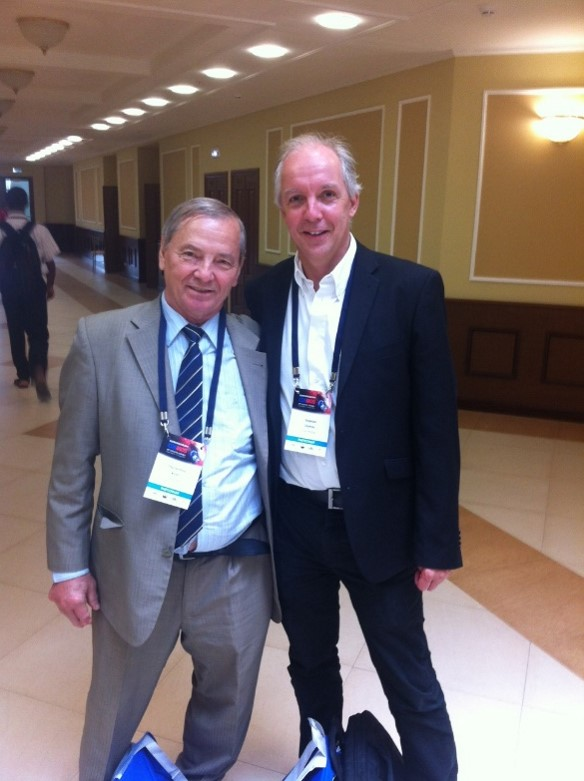
- Stephan Ulamec with Klim Churyumov, during COSPAR, in 2014.
  Raumsonde Rosetta ( ISBN 978-3-4401-3083-4).
- Handbuch der Raumfahrttechnik, chapter on Weltraumastronomie und Planetenmissionen ( ISBN 978-3-446-45429-3).
- Spacecraft Operations, chapter on Lander Operations (ISBN 978-3-7091-1803-0).

== Awards and honours ==
- Member of International Academy of Astronautics (IAA).
- Member of European Geosciences Union (EGU).
- Asteroid (11818) Ulamec was named in his honour by the International Astronomical Union (IAU).
- Sir Arthur Clark Award, 2014.
- Wernher von Braun Ehrung (in German, honour) by the German Society for Aeronautics and Astronautics (DGLR), 2015.

== Selected publications ==
- Ulamec, Stephan; Biele, Jens (1 October 2009). "Surface elements and landing strategies for small bodies missions – Philae and beyond". Advances in Space Research. 44 (7): 847–858. Bibcode:2009AdSpR..44..847U. doi:10.1016/j.asr.2009.06.009.
- Ulamec, S.; Kucherenko, V.; Biele, J.; Bogatchev, A.; Makurin, A.; Matrossov, S. (February 2011). "Hopper concepts for small body landers". Advances in Space Research. 47 (3): 428–439. Bibcode:2011AdSpR..47..428U. doi:10.1016/j.asr.2010.09.013.
- Ulamec, Stephan; Biele, Jens; Bousquet, Pierre-W.; Gaudon, Philippe; Geurts, Koen; Ho, Tra-Mi; Krause, Christian; Lange, Caroline; Willnecker, Rainer; Witte, Lars (2014). "Landing on small bodies: From the Rosetta Lander to MASCOT and beyond" (PDF). Acta Astronautica. 93: 460–466. Bibcode:2014AcAau..93..460U. doi:10.1016/j.actaastro.2013.02.007.
- Ulamec, Stephan; Biele, Jens; Blazquez, Alejandro; Cozzoni, Barbara; Delmas, Cedric; Fantinati, Cinzia; Gaudon, Philippe; Geurts, Koen; Jurado, Eric; Küchemann, Oliver; Lommatsch, Valentina; Maibaum, Michael; Sierks, Holger; Witte, Lars (February 2015). "Rosetta Lander – Philae: Landing preparations" (PDF). Acta Astronautica. 107: 79–86. Bibcode:2015AcAau.107...79U. doi:10.1016/j.actaastro.2014.11.019.
- Biele, Jens; Ulamec, Stephan; Maibaum, Michael; Roll, Reinhard; Witte, Lars; Jurado, Eric; Muñoz, Pablo; Arnold, Walter; Auster, Hans-Ulrich; Casas, Carlos; Faber, Claudia; Fantinati, Cinzia; Finke, Felix; Fischer, Hans-Herbert; Geurts, Koen; Güttler, Carsten; Heinisch, Philip; Herique, Alain; Hviid, Stubbe; Kargl, Günter; Knapmeyer, Martin; Knollenberg, Jörg; Kofman, Wlodek; Kömle, Norbert; Kührt, Ekkehard; Lommatsch, Valentina; Mottola, Stefano; Pardo de Santayana, Ramon; Remetean, Emile; Scholten, Frank; Seidensticker, Klaus J.; Sierks, Holger; Spohn, Tilman (31 July 2015). "The landing(s) of Philae and inferences about comet surface mechanical properties". Science. 349 (6247) aaa9816. Bibcode:2015Sci...349a9816B. doi:10.1126/science.aaa9816. PMID 26228158. S2CID 29901828.
- Ulamec, Stephan; Fantinati, Cinzia; Maibaum, Michael; Geurts, Koen; Biele, Jens; Jansen, Sven; Küchemann, Oliver; Cozzoni, Barbara; Finke, Felix; Lommatsch, Valentina; Moussi-Soffys, Aurelie; Delmas, Cedric; O´Rourke, Laurence (1 August 2016). "Rosetta Lander – Landing and operations on comet 67P/Churyumov–Gerasimenko" (PDF). Acta Astronautica. 125: 80–91. Bibcode:2016AcAau.125...80U. doi:10.1016/j.actaastro.2015.11.029.
- Jaumann, R.; Schmitz, N.; Ho, T.-M.; Schröder, S. E.; Otto, K. A.; Stephan, K.; Elgner, S.; Krohn, K.; Preusker, F.; Scholten, F.; Biele, J.; Ulamec, S.; Krause, C.; Sugita, S.; Matz, K.-D.; Roatsch, T.; Parekh, R.; Mottola, S.; Grott, M.; Michel, P.; Trauthan, F.; Koncz, A.; Michaelis, H.; Lange, C.; Grundmann, J. T.; Maibaum, M.; Sasaki, K.; Wolff, F.; Reill, J.; Moussi-Soffys, A.; Lorda, L.; Neumann, W.; Vincent, J.-B.; Wagner, R.; Bibring, J.-P.; Kameda, S.; Yano, H.; Watanabe, S.; Yoshikawa, M.; Tsuda, Y.; Okada, T.; Yoshimitsu, T.; Mimasu, Y.; Saiki, T.; Yabuta, H.; Rauer, H.; Honda, R.; Morota, T.; Yokota, Y.; Kouyama, T. (23 August 2019). "Images from the surface of asteroid Ryugu show rocks similar to carbonaceous chondrite meteorites". Science. 365 (6455): 817–820. Bibcode:2019Sci...365..817J. doi:10.1126/science.aaw8627. PMID 31439797. S2CID 201616571.
- Thomas, N.; Ulamec, S.; Kührt, E.; Ciarletti, V.; Gundlach, B.; Yoldi, Z.; Schwehm, G.; Snodgrass, C.; Green, S. F. (December 2019). "Towards New Comet Missions". Space Science Reviews. 215 (8): 47. Bibcode:2019SSRv..215...47T. doi:10.1007/s11214-019-0611-0. hdl:20.500.11820/c37de5be-9dbc-493c-ad57-e37b2978e970. S2CID 208652862.
- Michel, Patrick; Ulamec, Stephan; Böttger, Ute; Grott, Matthias; Murdoch, Naomi; Vernazza, Pierre; Sunday, Cecily; Zhang, Yun; Valette, Rudy; Castellani, Romain; Biele, Jens; Tardivel, Simon; Groussin, Olivier; Jorda, Laurent; Knollenberg, Jörg; Grundmann, Jan Thimo; Arrat, Denis; Pont, Gabriel; Mary, Stephane; Grebenstein, Markus; Miyamoto, Hirdy; Nakamura, Tomoki; Wada, Koji; Yoshikawa, Kent; Kuramoto, Kiyoshi (December 2022). "The MMX rover: performing in situ surface investigations on Phobos". Earth, Planets and Space. 74 (1): 2. Bibcode:2022EP&S...74....2M. doi:10.1186/s40623-021-01464-7. hdl:2115/83920. S2CID 234254574.
- Michel, Patrick; Küppers, Michael; Bagatin, Adriano Campo; Carry, Benoit; Charnoz, Sébastien; Leon, Julia de; Fitzsimmons, Alan; Gordo, Paulo; Green, Simon F.; Hérique, Alain; Juzi, Martin; Karatekin, Özgür; Kohout, Tomas; Lazzarin, Monica; Murdoch, Naomi; Okada, Tatsuaki; Palomba, Ernesto; Pravec, Petr; Snodgrass, Colin; Tortora, Paolo; Tsiganis, Kleomenis; Ulamec, Stephan; Vincent, Jean-Baptiste; Wünnemann, Kai; Zhang, Yun; Raducan, Sabina D.; Dotto, Elisabetta; Chabot, Nancy; Cheng, Andy F.; Rivkin, Andy; Barnouin, Olivier; Ernst, Carolyn; Stickle, Angela; Richardson, Derek C.; Thomas, Cristina; Arakawa, Masahiko; Miyamoto, Hirdy; Nakamura, Akiko; Sugita, Seiji; Yoshikawa, Makoto; Abell, Paul; Asphaug, Erik; Ballouz, Ronald-Louis; Bottke, William F.; Lauretta, Dante S.; Walsh, Kevin J.; Martino, Paolo; Carnelli, Ian (July 2022). "The ESA Hera Mission: Detailed Characterization of the DART Impact Outcome and of the Binary Asteroid (65803) Didymos". The Planetary Science Journal. 3 (7): 160. Bibcode:2022PSJ.....3..160M. doi:10.3847/PSJ/ac6f52. hdl:10045/125568. S2CID 250599919.
