= 1426 Riviera =

Bright asteroid from the central regions of the asteroid belt

Discovery
- Discovered by: M. Laugier
- Discovery site: Nice Obs.
- Discovery date: 1 April 1937

Designations
- Named after: French Riviera (Mediterranean coast)
- Alternative designations: 1937 GF · 1930 UD_{1} 1933 HJ · 1938 SN; 1949 HP · 2004 ST_{12} A920 CA
- Minor planet category: main-belt · (middle) background

Orbital characteristics
- Epoch 4 September 2017 (JD 2458000.5)
- Uncertainty parameter 0
- Observation arc: 80.50 yr (29,403 days)
- Aphelion: 2.9943 AU
- Perihelion: 2.1690 AU
- Semi-major axis: 2.5816 AU
- Eccentricity: 0.1598
- Orbital period (sidereal): 4.15 yr (1,515 days)
- Mean anomaly: 111.74°
- Mean motion: 0° 14^{m} 15.36^{s} / day
- Inclination: 9.0632°
- Longitude of ascending node: 335.04°
- Argument of perihelion: 275.05°

Physical characteristics
- Dimensions: 14.29±0.80 km 15.35 km (derived); 15.44±0.7 km 17.41±0.47 km 17.613±0.110 km 18.033±0.094 km
- Synodic rotation period: 4.38±0.06 h 4.4±0.1 h 4.40 h 4.4044±0.0002 h
- Geometric albedo: 0.2671±0.0290; 0.281±0.017; 0.3274 (derived); 0.3546±0.037; 0.414±0.048
- Spectral type: S (assumed)
- Absolute magnitude (H): 10.80 · 10.9

1426 Riviera, provisional designation 1937 GF, is a bright asteroid from the central regions of the asteroid belt, approximately 16 kilometers in diameter. Discovered by Marguerite Laugier at the Nice Observatory in 1937, the asteroid was later named for the Côte d'Azur, also known as French Riviera.

== Discovery ==
Riviera was discovered on 1 April 1937, by French astronomer Marguerite Laugier at the Nice Observatory in southeastern France. Two nights later, the asteroid was independently discovered by South African astronomer Cyril Jackson at the Union Observatory in Johannesburg on 3 April 1937. The Minor Planet Center only recognizes the first discoverer. The asteroid was first identified as A920 CA at the German Bergedorf Observatory in February 1920.

== Orbit and classification ==
Riviera is a non-family asteroid of the main belt's background population. It orbits the Sun in the central asteroid belt at a distance of 2.2–3.0 AU once every 4 years and 2 months (1,515 days). Its orbit has an eccentricity of 0.16 and an inclination of 9° with respect to the ecliptic. The body's observation arc begins at Johannesburg Observatory in 1937, two weeks after its official discovery observation at Nice.

== Physical characteristics ==
Riviera is an assumed stony S-type asteroid.

=== Rotation period ===
In March 2003, a rotational lightcurve of Riviera was obtained from photometric observations by French amateur astronomers Laurent Bernasconi and Nathanaël Berger. Lightcurve analysis gave a well-defined rotation period of 4.4044 hours with a brightness amplitude of 0.30 magnitude (U=3). Other lightcurves with a concurring period between 4.38 and 4.40 hours were obtained by René Roy, Horacio Correia and by a group of astronomers at the Pico dos Dias Observatory in Brazil (U=2/2/3-).

=== Diameter and albedo ===
According to the surveys carried out by the Infrared Astronomical Satellite IRAS, the Japanese Akari satellite and the NEOWISE mission of NASA's Wide-field Infrared Survey Explorer, Riviera measures between 14.29 and 18.033 kilometers in diameter and its surface has an albedo between 0.2671 and 0.414.

The Collaborative Asteroid Lightcurve Link derives an albedo of 0.3274 and a diameter of 15.35 kilometers based on an absolute magnitude of 10.9.

== Naming ==
This minor planet was named after the French Riviera (Côte d'Azur), the Mediterranean coast in southeastern France, noted for its mild weather and where the discovering Nice Observatory is located. The asteroid's name was suggested by Frederick Pilcher, after whom 1990 Pilcher was named. The official naming citation was published by the Minor Planet Center on 8 April 1982 (M.P.C. 6831).
