= 1690 Mayrhofer =

Main-belt asteroid

Discovery
- Discovered by: M. Laugier
- Discovery site: Nice Obs.
- Discovery date: 8 November 1948

Designations
- Named after: Karl Mayrhofer (amateur astronomer)
- Alternative designations: 1948 VB · 1932 WN; 1953 VC_{2} · 1956 GN
- Minor planet category: main-belt · (outer)

Orbital characteristics
- Epoch 4 September 2017 (JD 2458000.5)
- Uncertainty parameter 0
- Observation arc: 84.11 yr (30,723 days)
- Aphelion: 3.3376 AU
- Perihelion: 2.7395 AU
- Semi-major axis: 3.0386 AU
- Eccentricity: 0.0984
- Orbital period (sidereal): 5.30 yr (1,935 days)
- Mean anomaly: 24.198°
- Mean motion: 0° 11^{m} 9.96^{s} / day
- Inclination: 13.049°
- Longitude of ascending node: 230.45°
- Argument of perihelion: 156.46°

Physical characteristics
- Dimensions: 31.18±0.49 km 31.198±7.539 km 31.63 km (derived); 31.71±2.0 km 33.810±1.378 km
- Synodic rotation period: 19.0808±0.1110 h 22.194±0.004 h
- Geometric albedo: 0.056±0.012; 0.0641 (derived); 0.0767±0.011; 0.0792±0.0384; 0.082±0.003
- Spectral type: C
- Absolute magnitude (H): 10.9 · 10.91±0.34 · 10.950±0.004 (R) · 11.1

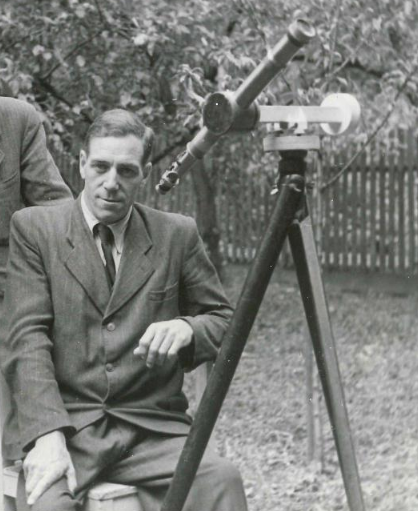
Karl Mayrhofer anno 1947

1690 Mayrhofer, provisional designation 1948 VB, is a carbonaceous asteroid from the outer region of the asteroid belt, approximately 32 kilometers in diameter. It was discovered on 8 November 1948, by French astronomer Marguerite Laugier at Nice Observatory in south-east France. It was later named after Austrian amateur astronomer Karl Mayrhofer.

== Orbit and classification ==
The C-type asteroid orbits the Sun in the outer main-belt at a distance of 2.7–3.3 AU once every 5 years and 4 months (1,935 days). Its orbit has an eccentricity of 0.10 and an inclination of 13° with respect to the ecliptic. First identified as 1932 WN at Uccle, Mayrhofer's observation arc begins with its first used observation taken at Goethe Link Observatory in 1953, or 5 years after its official discovery observation at Nice.

== Physical characteristics ==
=== Rotation period ===
In November 2006, a rotational lightcurve of Mayrhofer was obtained from observations taken by French amateur astronomer Pierre Antonini, giving a rotation period of 22.194 hours with a brightness variation of 0.45 in magnitude (U=2). Photometric observation in the R-band at the Palomar Transient Factory in November 2011, gave a shorter period of 19.0808 hours with an amplitude of 0.30 magnitude (U=2).

=== Diameter and albedo ===
According to the surveys carried out by the Infrared Astronomical Satellite IRAS, the Japanese Akari satellite, and NASA's Wide-field Infrared Survey Explorer with its subsequent NEOWISE mission, Mayrhofer measures between 31.18 and 33.81 kilometers in diameter, and its surface has an albedo between 0.056 and 0.082. The Collaborative Asteroid Lightcurve Link derives an albedo of 0.064 and a diameter of 31.63 kilometers based on an absolute magnitude of 11.1.

== Naming ==
Proposed by German catholic priest and amateur astronomer Otto Kippes, this minor planet was named after Austrian amateur astronomer Karl Mayrhofer (1903–1982). He lived in the Austrian town of Ried im Innkreis and was known for his calculations of orbital elements for asteroids. Naming citation was published on 1 October 1980 (M.P.C. 5523).
