= 1461 Jean-Jacques =

Metallic asteroid from the outer region of the asteroid belt

Discovery
- Discovered by: M. Laugier
- Discovery site: Nice Obs.
- Discovery date: 30 December 1937

Designations
- Named after: Jean-Jacques Laugier (son of discoverer)
- Alternative designations: 1937 YL · 1935 OH; 1939 GH
- Minor planet category: main-belt · (outer)

Orbital characteristics
- Epoch 4 September 2017 (JD 2458000.5)
- Uncertainty parameter 0
- Observation arc: 81.92 yr (29,921 days)
- Aphelion: 3.2752 AU
- Perihelion: 2.9749 AU
- Semi-major axis: 3.1250 AU
- Eccentricity: 0.0480
- Orbital period (sidereal): 5.52 yr (2,018 days)
- Mean anomaly: 183.52°
- Mean motion: 0° 10^{m} 42.24^{s} / day
- Inclination: 15.314°
- Longitude of ascending node: 104.64°
- Argument of perihelion: 335.41°

Physical characteristics
- Dimensions: 25.33±1.04 km 32.94±1.4 km (IRAS:8); 33.75±1.40 km 35.145±0.172; 41.431±0.464 km
- Synodic rotation period: 16.56±0.01 h
- Geometric albedo: 0.1022±0.0095; 0.1613±0.014 (IRAS:8); 0.168±0.017; 0.172±0.030; 0.273±0.043
- Spectral type: Tholen = M · X · M B–V = 0.715; U–B = 0.210
- Absolute magnitude (H): 9.97±0.33 · 10.01

1461 Jean-Jacques, provisional designation 1937 YL, is a metallic asteroid from the outer region of the asteroid belt, approximately 34 kilometers in diameter. It was discovered on 30 December 1937, by French astronomer Marguerite Laugier at Nice Observatory in southern France, who named it after her son Jean-Jacques Laugier.

== Orbit and classification ==
Jean-Jacques orbits the Sun in the outer main-belt at a distance of 3.0–3.3 AU once every 5 years and 6 months (2,018 days). Its orbit has an eccentricity of 0.05 and an inclination of 15° with respect to the ecliptic. The asteroid was first identified as 1935 OH at Johannesburg Observatory in 1935, extending the body's observation arc by 2 years prior to its official discovery observation.

== Physical characteristics ==
In the Tholen classification, Jean-Jacques is a metallic M-type asteroid.

=== Rotation period ===
In March 2005, a rotational lightcurve of Jean-Jacques was obtained from photometric observations by Laurent Bernasconi and Horacio Correia. Lightcurve analysis gave a rotation period of 16.56 hours with a brightness variation of 0.09 in magnitude (U=2).

=== Diameter and albedo ===
According to the surveys carried out by the Infrared Astronomical Satellite IRAS, the Japanese Akari satellite, and NASA's Wide-field Infrared Survey Explorer with its subsequent NEOWISE mission, Jean-Jacques measures between 25.33 and 41.43 kilometers in diameter and its surface has an albedo between 0.102 and 0.273.

The Collaborative Asteroid Lightcurve Link adopts the results from IRAS, that is an albedo of 0.161 and a diameter of 32.94 kilometers with an absolute magnitude of 10.01.

== Naming ==
This minor planet was named after Jean-Jacques Laugier, the son of the discoverer. The official naming citation was published by the Minor Planet Center on 31 January 1962 (M.P.C. 2116).
