= Lipót Schulhof =

Hungarian-Jewish astronomer

Asteroids discovered: 1
147 Protogeneia	10 July 1875	MPC

Lipót Schulhof (12 March 1847 in Baja – October 1921 in Paris; Hungarian: Schulhof Lipót; German: Leopold Schulhof or Schulhoff; French: Léopold Schulhof) was a Hungarian-Jewish astronomer, born in the Austrian Empire, who first worked at the Vienna Observatory and later spent most of his time at the Paris Observatory, observing comets and asteroids.

He provided a prediction for the 1893 return of comet 15P/Finlay, discovered the main-belt asteroid 147 Protogeneia in 1875, and was awarded the Lalande Prize of the French Academy of Sciences in 1893. Schulhof won the Lalande Prize again in 1920 for his calculation, assisted by Joseph Bossert, of the orbit of the periodic comet 12P/Pons–Brooks, discovered in 1812 by Pons.

Schulhof calculated the orbits of many asteroids and comets, taking perturbative interactions into account. With his exhaustive studies of objects such as comet 27P/Crommelin and others, he advanced the recovery of lost comets as well as those of lost minor planets.

The main-belt asteroid 2384 Schulhof, discovered by Marguerite Laugier in 1943, was named in his honor.
