= 1681 Steinmetz =

Main-belt asteroid

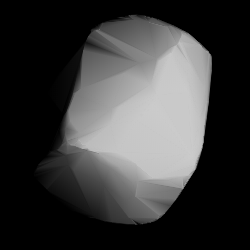
- Shape model of Steinmetz from its lightcurve

Discovery
- Discovered by: M. Laugier
- Discovery site: Nice Obs.
- Discovery date: 23 November 1948

Designations
- Named after: Julius Steinmetz (amateur astronomer)
- Alternative designations: 1948 WE · 1926 YA; 1936 BE · 1939 VC; 1945 ED · 1957 YH; 1958 AE · A914 DB
- Minor planet category: main-belt · (middle)

Orbital characteristics
- Epoch 4 September 2017 (JD 2458000.5)
- Uncertainty parameter 0
- Observation arc: 103.18 yr (37,688 days)
- Aphelion: 3.2486 AU
- Perihelion: 2.1443 AU
- Semi-major axis: 2.6965 AU
- Eccentricity: 0.2048
- Orbital period (sidereal): 4.43 yr (1,617 days)
- Mean anomaly: 169.22°
- Mean motion: 0° 13^{m} 21.36^{s} / day
- Inclination: 7.2063°
- Longitude of ascending node: 94.373°
- Argument of perihelion: 1.6555°

Physical characteristics
- Dimensions: 14.58±0.75 km 16.159±0.342 km 20.49 km (calculated)
- Synodic rotation period: 8.99917±0.00007 h
- Geometric albedo: 0.10 (assumed); 0.161±0.041; 0.204±0.024
- Spectral type: Tholen = S · S B–V = 0.878; U–B = 0.447
- Absolute magnitude (H): 11.37±0.33 · 11.56

1681 Steinmetz, provisional designation 1948 WE, is a stony asteroid from the central region of the asteroid belt, approximately 16 kilometers in diameter. It was discovered on 23 November 1948, by French astronomer Marguerite Laugier at Nice Observatory in south-eastern France. It was named after German amateur astronomer Julius Steinmetz.

== Orbit and classification ==
Steinmetz orbits the Sun in the central main-belt at a distance of 2.1–3.2 AU once every 4 years and 5 months (1,617 days). Its orbit has an eccentricity of 0.20 and an inclination of 7° with respect to the ecliptic. Steinmetz was first identified as A914 DB at Heidelberg Observatory in 1914, extending the body's observation arc by 34 years prior to its official discovery observation at Nice.

== Physical characteristics ==
This asteroid is characterized as a common S-type asteroid in the Tholen classification.

=== Rotation period ===
In December 2006, Italian amateur astronomer Silvano Casulli obtained a rotational lightcurve of Steinmetz from photometric observations. It gave a well-defined rotation period of 8.99917 hours with a brightness variation of 0.42 magnitude (U=3).

=== Diameter and albedo ===
According to the surveys carried out by the Japanese Akari satellite and NASA's Wide-field Infrared Survey Explorer with its subsequent NEOWISE mission, Steinmetz measures 14.58 and 16.16 kilometers in diameter, and its surface has an albedo of 0.204 and 0.161, respectively. The Collaborative Asteroid Lightcurve Link assumes an albedo of 0.10 and calculates a diameter of 20.49 kilometers based on an absolute magnitude of 11.56.

== Naming ==
According to a proposal by Otto Kippes, who verified the discovery, this minor planet was named after Julius Steinmetz (1893–1965), a German amateur astronomer, orbit computer, and pastor from Gerolfingen in Bavaria. The official naming citation was published by the Minor Planet Center on 1 October 1980 (M.P.C. 5523).
