= 1651 Behrens =

Asteroid

Discovery
- Discovered by: M. Laugier
- Discovery site: Nice Obs.
- Discovery date: 23 April 1936

Designations
- Named after: Johann Behrens (pastor, astronomer)
- Alternative designations: 1936 HD · 1939 EJ; 1940 QD · 1944 YA; 1947 WA · 1950 TB_{4} 1952 FF · 1952 HB; 1952 KG · 1958 BC; 1961 AB · 1963 UQ
- Minor planet category: main-belt · Flora

Orbital characteristics
- Epoch 4 September 2017 (JD 2458000.5)
- Uncertainty parameter 0
- Observation arc: 81.03 yr (29,597 days)
- Aphelion: 2.3237 AU
- Perihelion: 2.0354 AU
- Semi-major axis: 2.1796 AU
- Eccentricity: 0.0661
- Orbital period (sidereal): 3.22 yr (1,175 days)
- Mean anomaly: 147.98°
- Mean motion: 0° 18^{m} 22.68^{s} / day
- Inclination: 5.0752°
- Longitude of ascending node: 187.51°
- Argument of perihelion: 339.10°

Physical characteristics
- Dimensions: 8.963±0.113; 9.264±0.080 km 10.25±2.24 km 10.31 km (calculated); 10.33±2.35 km
- Synodic rotation period: 34.34±0.10 h
- Geometric albedo: 0.20±0.14; 0.24 (assumed); 0.26±0.07; 0.3003±0.0264; 0.318±0.052
- Spectral type: S
- Absolute magnitude (H): 12.1 · 12.17±0.20 · 12.56

1651 Behrens, provisional designation 1936 HD, is a stony Florian asteroid from the inner regions of the asteroid belt, approximately 10 kilometers in diameter. Discovered by Marguerite Laugier in 1936, it was named after Johann Behrens.

== Discovery ==
Behrens was discovered on 23 April 1936, by French astronomer Marguerite Laugier at Nice Observatory in southeastern France. It was independently discovered by Karl Reinmuth at Heidelberg Observatory, Germany in the following month.

== Classification and orbit ==
Behrens is an S-type asteroid and member of the Flora family, a large group of stony asteroids in the inner main-belt. It orbits the Sun at a distance of 2.0–2.3 AU once every 3 years and 3 months (1,175 days). Its orbit has an eccentricity of 0.07 and an inclination of 5° with respect to the ecliptic. As no precoveries were taken, and no prior identifications were made, the body's observation arc begins with its official discovery observation.

== Physical characteristics ==
=== Rotation period ===
Astronomers Laurent Bernasconi and Stéphane Charbonnel obtained a rotational lightcurve of Behrens from photometric observations made in August 2001. It gave a longer than average rotation period of 34.34 hours with a brightness variation of 0.16 magnitude (U=2).

=== Diameter and albedo ===
According to the survey carried out by NASA's Wide-field Infrared Survey Explorer with its subsequent NEOWISE mission, Behrens measures between 8.96 and 10.33 kilometers in diameter, and its surface has an albedo between 0.20 and 0.318. The Collaborative Asteroid Lightcurve Link assumes an albedo of 0.24 – derived from 8 Flora, the largest member and namesake of this orbital family – and calculates a diameter of 10.31 kilometers with an absolute magnitude of 12.1.

== Naming ==
Based on a proposal by Otto Kippes, who verified the discovery, this minor planet was named after Johann Gerhard Behrens (1889–1978), German amateur astronomer and pastor at Detern, in lower Saxony. He was known for his orbit computations on comets and minor planets. The official naming citation was published by the Minor Planet Center on 1 October 1980 (M.P.C. 5523).
