= Paolo Farinella Prize =

- Awarded for: Significant contributions in Paolo Farinella's fields of interest
- First award: 2011
- Website: https://www.europlanet-society.org/paolo-farinella-prize/

The Paolo Farinella Prize is named after Paolo Farinella. The prize recognizes significant contributions in the fields of planetary sciences, space geodesy, fundamental physics, science popularization, security in space, weapons control, and disarmament. Recipients must be under the age of 47 (the age at which Farinella died) to qualify for the prize.

== Prize winners ==
Year	Name
2011	William Bottke
2012	John Chambers
2013	Patrick Michel
2014	David Vokrouhlický
2015	Nicolas Biver
2016	Kleomenis Tsiganis
2017	Simone Marchi
2018	Francis Nimmo
2019	Scott Sheppard and Chad Trujillo
2020	Jonathan Fortney and Heather Knutson
2021	Diana Valencia and Lena Noack
2022	Castillo-Rogez and Martin Jutzi
2023	Federica Spoto and Diego Turrini
2024	Ravit Helled

== See also ==
- List of astronomy awards
