= 3568 ASCII =

Asteroid

Discovery
- Discovered by: M. Laugier
- Discovery site: Nice Obs.
- Discovery date: 17 October 1936

Designations
- Named after: ASCII / ASCII (magazine) (character code and magazine)
- Alternative designations: 1936 UB · 1975 WZ_{1}
- Minor planet category: main-belt · (outer) background

Orbital characteristics
- Epoch 23 March 2018 (JD 2458200.5)
- Uncertainty parameter 0
- Observation arc: 81.52 yr (29,776 d)
- Aphelion: 3.8974 AU
- Perihelion: 2.4073 AU
- Semi-major axis: 3.1523 AU
- Eccentricity: 0.2363
- Orbital period (sidereal): 5.60 yr (2,044 d)
- Mean anomaly: 264.51°
- Mean motion: 0° 10^{m} 33.96^{s} / day
- Inclination: 19.454°
- Longitude of ascending node: 58.210°
- Argument of perihelion: 280.22°
- T_{Jupiter}: 3.0770

Physical characteristics
- Mean diameter: 23.752±0.211 km
- Geometric albedo: 0.045±0.007
- Spectral type: D (SDSS-MOC)
- Absolute magnitude (H): 11.8

3568 ASCII, provisional designation 1936 UB, is a dark background asteroid from the outer regions of the asteroid belt, approximately 24 kilometers (15 miles) in diameter. It was discovered on 17 October 1936, by French astronomer Marguerite Laugier at the Nice Observatory in southwestern France. In 1988, the D-type asteroid was named after both the computer character code ASCII and the Japanese computer magazine with the same name.

== Orbit and classification ==
ASCII is a non-family asteroid from the main belt's background population. It orbits the Sun in the outer main-belt at a distance of 2.4–3.9 AU once every 5 years and 7 months (2,044 days; semi-major axis of 3.15 AU). Its orbit has an eccentricity of 0.24 and an inclination of 19° with respect to the ecliptic.

The body's observation arc begins with its observation as 1975 WZ_{1} at the Karl Schwarzschild Observatory in November 1975, or more than 39 years after its official discovery observation at Nice.

== Physical characteristics ==
ASCII has an absolute magnitude of 11.8. Based on the Moving Object Catalog (MOC) of the Sloan Digital Sky Survey, the body has a spectral type of a very dark D-type asteroid, typically found in the outer main-belt and numerous among the Jupiter trojans. As of 2018, no rotational lightcurve of this asteroid has been obtained from photometric observations. The body's rotation period, pole and shape remain unknown.

=== Diameter and albedo ===
According to the survey carried out by the NEOWISE mission of NASA's Wide-field Infrared Survey Explorer, ASCII measures 23.752 kilometers in diameter and its surface has an albedo of 0.045.

== Naming ==
This minor planet was named after the acronym for American Standard Code for Information Interchange, ASCII, a computer character code and the name of a major Japanese magazine on microcomputers. The name was proposed by Syuichi Nakano, who identified this asteroid during his stay at the Smithsonian Astrophysical Observatory; a stay which was partially funded by articles he wrote for the principal Japanese ASCII magazine. The official naming citation was published by the Minor Planet Center on 2 April 1988 (M.P.C. 12973).
