= 1755 Lorbach =

Asteroid

Discovery
- Discovered by: M. Laugier
- Discovery site: Nice Obs.
- Discovery date: 8 November 1936

Designations
- Named after: Anne Lorbach Herget (wife of Paul Herget)
- Alternative designations: 1936 VD · 1935 QA_{1} 1936 UK · 1949 ED; 1956 NA · 1960 EA; 1965 AV · A924 PA
- Minor planet category: main-belt · (outer); Eos

Orbital characteristics
- Epoch 4 September 2017 (JD 2458000.5)
- Uncertainty parameter 0
- Observation arc: 92.72 yr (33,866 days)
- Aphelion: 3.2391 AU
- Perihelion: 2.9443 AU
- Semi-major axis: 3.0917 AU
- Eccentricity: 0.0477
- Orbital period (sidereal): 5.44 yr (1,986 days)
- Mean anomaly: 241.19°
- Mean motion: 0° 10^{m} 52.68^{s} / day
- Inclination: 10.707°
- Longitude of ascending node: 157.11°
- Argument of perihelion: 322.08°

Physical characteristics
- Dimensions: 24.878±0.265 km
- Geometric albedo: 0.140±0.024
- Spectral type: Tholen = S B–V = 0.915; U–B = 0.360
- Absolute magnitude (H): 10.77

1755 Lorbach, provisional designation 1936 VD, is a stony Eoan asteroid from the outer region of the asteroid belt, approximately 25 kilometers in diameter.

It was discovered on 8 November 1936, by French astronomer Marguerite Laugier at Nice Observatory in southeastern France, and named after Anne Lorbach Herget, wife of astronomer Paul Herget.

== Classification and orbit ==
Lorbach is a member of the Eos family (606), the largest asteroid family in the outer main belt consisting of nearly 10,000 asteroids. It orbits the Sun at a distance of 2.9–3.2 AU once every 5 years and 5 months (1,986 days). Its orbit has an eccentricity of 0.05 and an inclination of 11° with respect to the ecliptic. Lorbach was first identified as A924 PA at Heidelberg Observatory in 1924. The body's observation arc, however, begins 2 days after its official discovery observation at Nice in 1936.

== Physical characteristics ==
According to the survey carried out by NASA's Wide-field Infrared Survey Explorer with its subsequent NEOWISE mission, Lorbach measures 24.88 kilometers in diameter, and its surface has an albedo of 0.140. It is a stony S-type asteroid on the Tholen taxonomic scheme, and has an absolute magnitude of 10.77. As of 2017, Lorbach's spectral type, rotation period and shape remain unknown.

== Naming ==
This minor planet was named after the maiden name of American Anne Lorbach Herget, the second wife of astronomer Paul Herget, after whom the minor planet 1751 Herget is named. Anne worked as an assistant at the Cincinnati Observatory since the 1960s, key-punching MPC-data and assigning provisional designations to minor planets. The official naming citation was published by the Minor Planet Center on 1 August 1978 (M.P.C. 4419).
