= 1247 Memoria =

Asteroid

Discovery
- Discovered by: M. Laugier
- Discovery site: Uccle Obs.
- Discovery date: 30 August 1932

Designations
- Pronunciation: /mɪˈmɔːriə/
- Named after: memoria (Latin for memory; remembrance)
- Alternative designations: 1932 QA · 1927 UL; 1931 JU · 1936 FN; A905 WA
- Minor planet category: main-belt · (outer); Themis

Orbital characteristics
- Epoch 4 September 2017 (JD 2458000.5)
- Uncertainty parameter 0
- Observation arc: 112.03 yr (40,920 days)
- Aphelion: 3.6792 AU
- Perihelion: 2.5851 AU
- Semi-major axis: 3.1321 AU
- Eccentricity: 0.1747
- Orbital period (sidereal): 5.54 yr (2,025 days)
- Mean anomaly: 130.45°
- Mean motion: 0° 10^{m} 40.08^{s} / day
- Inclination: 1.7780°
- Longitude of ascending node: 161.73°
- Argument of perihelion: 139.43°

Physical characteristics
- Dimensions: 35.97±1.9 km 38.906±0.174 km
- Geometric albedo: 0.078±0.014; 0.0846±0.009
- Spectral type: Tholen = CXF; B–V = 0.680; U–B = 0.290
- Absolute magnitude (H): 10.52

1247 Memoria, provisional designation 1932 QA, is a dark Themistian asteroid from the outer regions of the asteroid belt, approximately 37 kilometers in diameter. It was discovered by Marguerite Laugier at Uccle Observatory in 1932, who later named it Memoria in memory of her pleasant stay at the discovering observatory.

== Discovery ==
Memoria was discovered on 30 August 1932, by French astronomer Marguerite Laugier at the Royal Observatory of Belgium in Uccle. On the same night, it was independently discovered by Soviet astronomer Grigory Neujmin at the Simeiz Observatory on the Crimean peninsula. One week later, on 6 September 1932, it was again independently discovered by German astronomer Karl Reinmuth at Heidelberg Observatory. The Minor Planet Center only recognizes the first discoverer.

== Orbit and classification ==
Memoria belongs to the Themis family (602), a very large family of typically carbonaceous asteroids, named after 24 Themis. It orbits the Sun in the outer main-belt at a distance of 2.6–3.7 AU once every 5 years and 6 months (2,025 days; semi-major axis of 3.13 AU). Its orbit has an eccentricity of 0.17 and an inclination of 2° with respect to the ecliptic.

The asteroid was first observed as A905 WA at Heidelberg Observatory in November 1905. The body's observation arc begins as 1931 JU at Johannesburg Observatory in May 1931, or 15 months prior to its official discovery observation at Uccle.

== Physical characteristics ==
In the Tholen classification, Memoria's spectral type is ambiguous, closest to a carbonaceous C-type, and somewhat similar to an X- and F-type asteroid (CXF). The overall spectral type for members of the Themis family is that of a C-type.

=== Rotation period ===
As of 2018, no rotational lightcurve of Memoria has been obtained from photometric observations. The asteroid's rotation period, shape and poles remain unknown.

=== Diameter and albedo ===
According to the surveys carried out by the Infrared Astronomical Satellite IRAS and the NEOWISE mission of NASA's Wide-field Infrared Survey Explorer, Memoria measures 35.97 and 38.906 kilometers in diameter and its surface has an albedo of 0.0846 and 0.078, respectively.

== Naming ==
This minor planet was named "memoria" (Latin for memory or remembrance) by the French discoverer Marguerite Laugier who remembered the pleasant relationships she had during her stay at the discovering Uccle Observatory, Belgium, in 1932. The official naming citation was mentioned in The Names of the Minor Planets by Paul Herget in 1955 (H 115).
