= Farinella =

Farinella is an Italian surname. Notable people with the surname include:

- Giuseppe Farinella (1925–2017), Sicilian Mafiosi
- Paolo Farinella (1953–2000), Italian astronomer

== See also ==
- 3248 Farinella, a main-belt asteroid
