= Francis Nimmo =

Planetary Scientist and academic

- Born: 11 May 1971
- Alma mater: St John's College
- Occupation: Scientist; university teacher
- Awards: Royal Society University Research Fellowship (2001–2004); James B. Macelwane Medal (2007); Harold C. Urey Prize (2007); Paolo Farinella Prize (for his contribution to the field of “Giant planets’ satellite systems”, 2018); Fellow of the Royal Society (2024)
- Academic career
- Fields: Geology, planet, planetary science, planetary geology, geophysics
- Institutions: University of California Santa Cruz
- Thesis: Volcanism and tectonics on Venus

Walter Heron Francis Nimmo (born 1971) is a Professor of Planetary Science at the University of California Santa Cruz.

== Biography ==
=== Education ===
Nimmo attended Wolverhampton Grammar School and received his Bachelor of Arts degree in Geological Sciences from St John's College, Cambridge University, in 1993 and completed his Ph.D. on Volcanism and Tectonics on Venus from Cambridge in 1996.

=== Career ===
His research focuses on the origin and evolution of solid body surfaces and interiors from observations and geophysical modelling. Some of his research achievements include his showing that a giant impact could have generated the Martian hemispheric dichotomy, identification of shear-heating as an important process on Enceladus, Europa and Triton and the explanation of the link between plate tectonics and dynamo activity on Mars and Venus.

=== Awards and honors ===
- 2001: President's Award of the Geological Society
- 2001: Royal Society University Research Fellowship
- 2007: James B. Macelwane Medal of the American Geophysical Union
- 2007: Nimmo received the Harold C. Urey Prize of the Division for Planetary Sciences
- 2011: Japan Society for the Promotion of Science (JSPS) Visiting Fellow
- 2018: He is a recipient of the 2018 Paolo Farinella Prize.
- 2018: Asteroid 175920 Francisnimmo was named in his honor. The official naming citation was published by the Minor Planet Center on 25 September 2018 (M.P.C. 111802).
- 2019: He receives the 2019 Harold Jeffreys Lectureship of the RAS.
- 2020: Elected to the US National Academy of Sciences
- 2024: Elected Fellow of the Royal Society
