= Paolo Farinella =

Italian astronomer

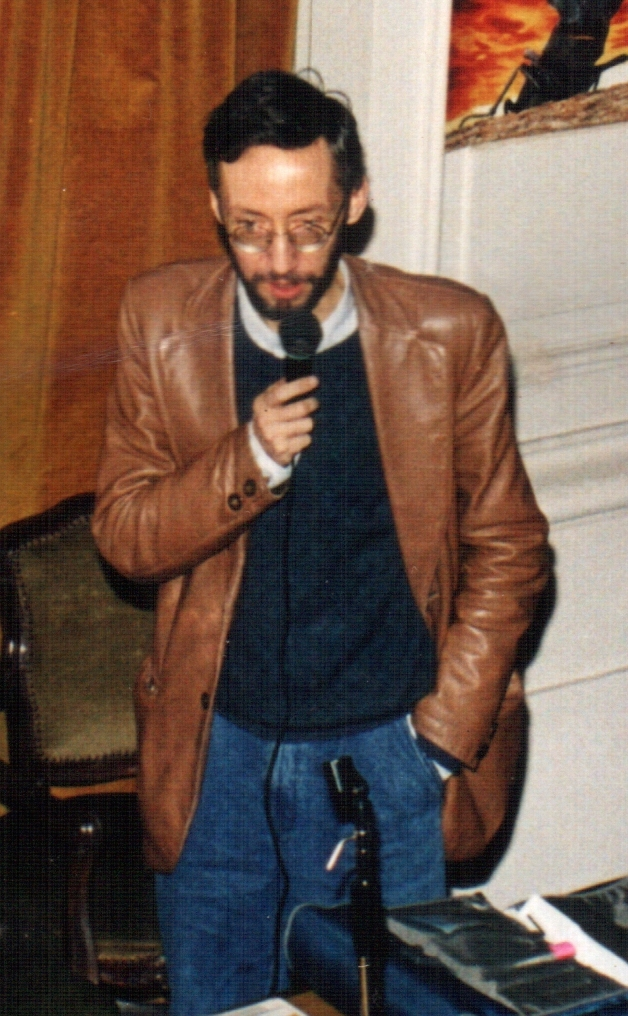
- Farinella giving a public lecture in Genoa in May 1999
- Born: 13 January 1953; Migliarino, Italy
- Died: 25 March 2000 (aged 47); Bergamo, Italy
- Known for: study of asteroids and small bodies in solar system
- Scientific career
- Fields: Astronomy, astrophysics
- Workplaces: Observatory of Brera Scuola Normale Superiore; Nice Observatory University of Trieste
- Doctoral advisor: Giuseppe Colombo

Paolo Farinella (13 January 1953 – 25 March 2000) was an Italian scientist active in the field of planetary science and in particular in the study of asteroids and other small bodies of the Solar System.

== Biography ==
Paolo Farinella was born on 13 January 1953 in Migliarino, close to Ferrara in Italy. He received his degree in 1975 at the University and the "Scuola Normale Superiore" of Pisa. After that he became a graduate student of Giuseppe (Bepi) Colombo and worked as a research astronomer at the Observatory of Brera.

From 1982 to 1998, he was a university researcher in Pisa, at the Department of Mathematics and at the Scuola Normale Superiore, teaching Physics and Celestial Mechanics. In the period 1992–1994 he was visiting professor at the Nice Observatory with an ESA "Giuseppe Colombo" fellowship.

In summer 1998 he won a national competition for a position of associate professor of astronomy and astrophysics in the Italian university, and starting from late 1998 he taught at the University of Trieste. Paolo Farinella died in Bergamo on 25 March 2000, due to heart failure.

== The work as planetary scientist ==
His work as planetary scientist changed the view of the solar system revolutionizing the way orbital and collisional histories of asteroids are seen. He used his ideas in many fields of the space science that can be summarized in the following activities:

- Planetary science: small bodies, collisions, satellites, dynamics, and space debris
- Space geodesy and fundamental physics
- Science popularization, social commitment of concerned scientists

In 1980's Farinella was among the first scientists to conjecture the Yarkovsky effect to be responsible for the migration of small asteroids from the main asteroid belt into different and potentially resonant orbits, with possible risks of impact on Earth.

Paolo Farinella was a member of the editorial board of "Icarus" and an Associate Editor of "Icarus" and "Meteoritics and Planetary Science". He was a member of the International Astronomical Union (IAU) and an affiliate member of the Division of Planetary Science (DPS) of the American Astronomical Society as well as a member of the Solar System Working Group of the European Space Agency.

He was very active into the astronomy popularization, writing dozens of articles that were mainly published by the Italian astronomical magazine "L'Astronomia".

== Honors ==
- In June 2010, ten years after his death, an international workshop in his name was held in Pisa. The Paolo Farinella Prize was proposed at this workshop and later was awarded annually from 2011 to 2024, followed by the Europlanet Mid-Career Medal awarded in his memory since 2025.
- In July 2015, after the New Horizons fly-by with Pluto, the New Horizons team gave the provisional name "Farinella" to a crater on Pluto, north of the Tombaugh Regio. The name was approved by IAU in 2024.
- Asteroid 3248 Farinella is named after him.
- One of the CubeSats flying on ESA's Ramses mission was named Farinella after him in 2026.

== Notable works ==
- Farinella, Paolo; Gonczi, R.; Froeschlé, Christiane; Froeschlé, Claude; "The injection of Asteroid Fragments into Resonances", Icarus n. 101, 174-187 (1993)
- Vokrouhlicky, D.; Farinella, Paolo; Mignard, F.; "Solar radiation pressure perturbations for earth satellites", Astronomy and Astrophysics 285, 333-343 (1994)
- Farinella, Paolo; Froeschlé, Christiane; Froeschlé, Claude; Gonczi, R.; Hahn, G.; Morbidelli, Alessandro; Valsecchi, G.; "Asteroids falling into the Sun", Nature Vol. 371, 22 September 1994
- Farinella, Paolo; Vokrouhlicky, D.; Barlier, F.; "The rotation of LAGEOS and its long-term semimajor axis decay: A self-consistent solution", Journal of Geophysical Research Vol 101, NO. B8, pages 17,861-17,872, August 10, 1996
