= Paul Herget =

American astronomer (1908–1981)

Paul Frederick Ernst Herget (January 30, 1908 – August 27, 1981) was an American astronomer and director of the Cincinnati Observatory. He established the Minor Planet Center in 1947, after World War II.

== Early life ==
Paul Frederick Ernst Herget was born in Cincinnati, Ohio on January 30, 1908, the son of Conrad Frederick and Clara (Brueckner) Herget. His father was an immigrant from Germany and his mother was born in Cincinnati to German immigrants. Herget graduated from Withrow High School.. He graduated from the University of Cincinnati with an A.B. in mathematics in 1931 and earned an M.A. in 1933.

== Career ==
Herget taught astronomy at the University of Cincinnati. He was a pioneer in the use of machine methods, and eventually digital computers, in the solving of scientific and specifically astronomical problems (for example, in the calculation of ephemeris tables for minor planets).

During World War II he applied these same talents to the war effort, helping to locate U-boats by means of the application of spherical trigonometry.

After the war, Herget established the Minor Planet Center in 1947. He was also named director of the Cincinnati Observatory. The Minor Planet Center was eventually relocated in 1978 to the Smithsonian Astrophysical Observatory in Cambridge, Massachusetts, where it still operates.

Herget is also credited with helping design the shape of the Pringles potato-based chip.

He died at his home in Cincinnati on August 27, 1981..

== Awards and honors ==
- In 1965 he was awarded the James Craig Watson Medal by the National Academy of Sciences for, "his scientific accomplishments in celestial mechanics and orbit computation, and particularly for his contributions to the knowledge of the orbits of asteroids".
- Asteroid 1751 Herget, discovered by astronomers with the Indiana Asteroid Program at Goethe Link Observatory in 1955, was named in his honor. The official naming citation was published by the Minor Planet Center on February 20, 1971 (M.P.C. 3143).
- On August 1, 1978, asteroid 1755 Lorbach, discovered by Marguerite Laugier at Nice in 1936, was named for his wife, Anne Lorbach Herget (M.P.C. 4419).

== Publication of discovery circumstances ==
In the 1950s and 1960s, Paul Herget compiled a large number of naming citations for minor planets, giving the discovery circumstances as well as background information on the name's origin and on the involved astronomers. His collected work is known as The Names of the Minor Planets and was published by the Cincinnati Observatory in 1955 and 1968. The last publication contains details of the discovery and naming of 1,564 minor planets up to the height of WWII in 1943, and spans from the first discovered minor planet, 1 Ceres, up to 1564 Srbija. Herget's discovery circumstances were later incorporated into the Dictionary of Minor Planet Names, which was prepared by astronomer Lutz Schmadel on behalf of IAU's commission 20. In this work, citations that originate from Herget's original compilation are marked with the letter "H" and the corresponding page number.

== See also ==
- Meanings of minor-planet names
