= 147 Protogeneia =

Main-belt asteroid

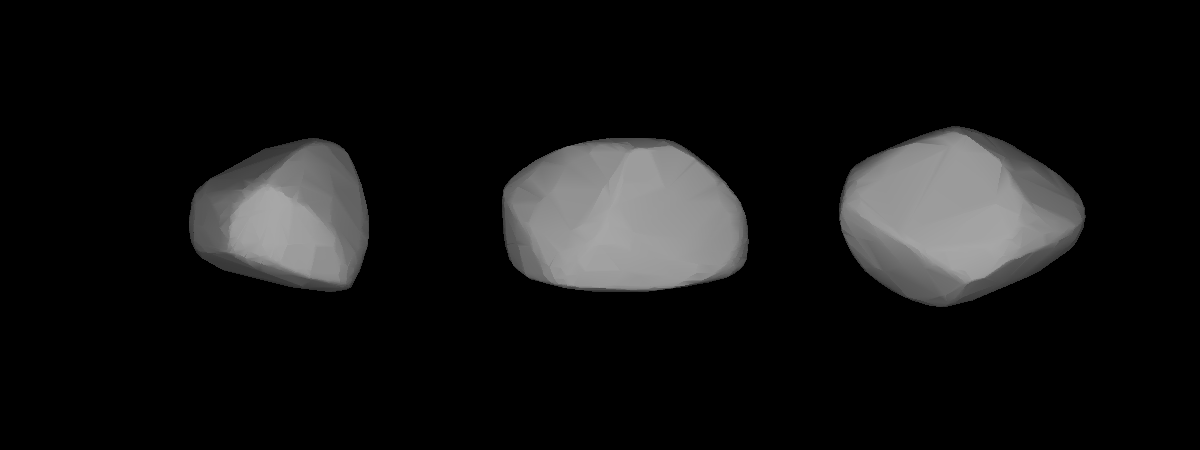
- A three-dimensional model of 147 Protogeneia based on its light curve

Discovery
- Discovered by: Lipót Schulhof
- Discovery date: 10 July 1875

Designations
- Pronunciation: /ˌprɒtoʊdʒɪˈniːə/
- Named after: Protogeneia
- Alternative designations: A875 PA
- Minor planet category: Main belt

Orbital characteristics
- Epoch 31 July 2016 (JD 2457600.5)
- Uncertainty parameter 0
- Observation arc: 132.02 yr (48222 d)
- Aphelion: 3.2230 AU (482.15 Gm)
- Perihelion: 3.04727 AU (455.865 Gm)
- Semi-major axis: 3.13512 AU (469.007 Gm)
- Eccentricity: 0.028020
- Orbital period (sidereal): 5.55 yr (2027.6 d)
- Average orbital speed: 16.82 km/s
- Mean anomaly: 92.9051°
- Mean motion: 0° 10^{m} 39.184^{s} / day
- Inclination: 1.9309°
- Longitude of ascending node: 248.357°
- Argument of perihelion: 100.692°
- Earth MOID: 2.03996 AU (305.174 Gm)
- Jupiter MOID: 1.90385 AU (284.812 Gm)
- T_{Jupiter}: 3.211

Physical characteristics
- Mean radius: 66.465±2.55 km 59.22 ± 5.225 km (composite estimate)
- Mass: (1.12±0.39)×10^{18} kg (Note: Calculated from its standard gravitational parameter GM = 0.075±0.026 km^{3}/s^{2}.)
- Mean density: 0.91 g/cm^{3} (Note: Assuming a diameter of 133 km.)
- Equatorial surface gravity: 0.0371 m/s²
- Equatorial escape velocity: 0.0703 km/s
- Synodic rotation period: 7.8528 h (0.32720 d)
- Geometric albedo: 0.0492±0.004
- Temperature: ~157 K
- Spectral type: C
- Apparent magnitude: 12.4 to 14.5
- Absolute magnitude (H): 8.27; 8.8

147 Protogenia is a main belt asteroid that was discovered by Hungarian astronomer Lipót Schulhof on July 10, 1875, from the Vienna Observatory; it was his only asteroid discovery. Its name is Greek for "first born" and was chosen by Karl L. Littrow in allusion to the fact that this was the first asteroid discovered by an astronomer who was already known for work in other fields of astronomy.

This object has a low orbital eccentricity and inclination. With an orbital period roughly double that of the planet Jupiter, it has been identified as a member of the Hecuba group of asteroids that share a 2:1 mean-motion orbital resonance with the giant planet. Based upon its spectrum, it has a Tholen classification as a C-type asteroid, which indicates that it has a dark surface and probably a primitive composition of carbonaceous material.

Photometric observations of this asteroid at the Altimira Observatory in 2004 gave a light curve with a period of 7.8528 ± 0.0008 hours and a brightness variation of 0.28 in magnitude. A photometric study was reported in 2006 from the Yunnan Observatory in China, finding a matching period of 7.852 hours and a brightness variation of 0.25 magnitude. They estimate the ratio of the lengths for the asteroid's major and minor axes is at least 1.26:1.

There is one reported stellar occultation by Protogeneia, on May 28, 2002, from Texas, United States.
