= Ravit Helled =

Israeli planetary scientist

- רוית הלד
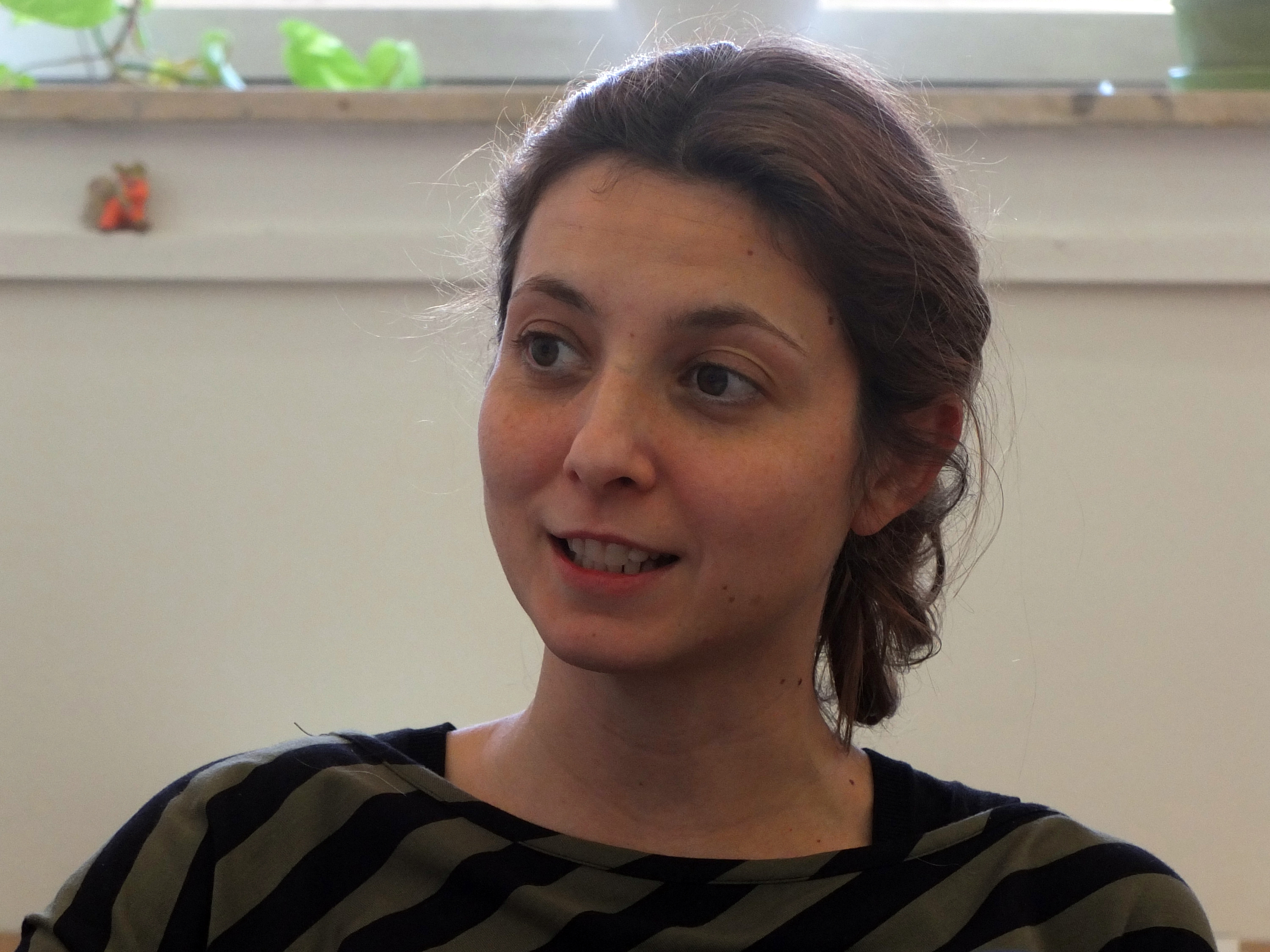
- Helled in February 2013
- Known for: Investigation of the composition of giant gas planets in the model of disk instability, investigation of the relationship between the rotation time of planets and their composition and internal structure, assessment of the rotation period of Saturn
- Awards: Ranked # 41 in Forbes Israel in the Forbes Israel list of the 50 most influential women in 2015
- Scientific career
- Fields: Planetary Sciences

Ravit Helled (Hebrew: רוית הלד) is a planetary scientist and a professor in the department of astrophysics and cosmology at the University of Zürich. She studies gas giant planets in the Solar System and exoplanets.

She is a member of the science team of Juno, a NASA probe to study the planet Jupiter. In 2015, she accurately calculated Saturn's rotational period together with Eli Galanti and Yohai Kaspi of the Weizmann Institute of Science. In 2015, she was selected among the 50 most influential women of Forbes Israel.

== Biography ==
Ravit Helled completed her bachelor's degree in science at Tel Aviv University in 2004. She continued her doctoral studies at Tel Aviv University, where she completed her PhD work on giant planet formation in 2007.

From 2007 to 2009 she was a postdoctoral fellow at the University of California Los Angeles in the Department of Planetary Science. In 2009, she was appointed a research fellow. During her time at the University of California, she studied the influence of planetesimals on the formation of gas giants, and modelled the outer planets in the Solar System.

In 2011 she was appointed senior lecturer in the Department of Earth Sciences of Tel Aviv University. In 2015, she was appointed associate professor in the Department of Earth Sciences. In 2016 she became a professor at the Institute for Computational Science at the University of Zurich. She is director of the University of Zürich (UZH) Space network.

Helled is part of the scientific team of the NASA Juno probe, which is investigating the planet Jupiter.

She is one of the lead scientists of the European Space Agency's JUICE Jupiter Icy Moon Explorer and also a member of the science team of the European Space Agency's Space Telescope PLATO (spacecraft) which is scheduled to be launched in 2026.

== Research ==
=== Planetary formation ===
Helled's research deals with the formation and evolution of planets in the Solar System and beyond. Her studies examine the relationship between the formation of planets and their internal structure, for the gas giants Jupiter and Saturn, and the ice giants Neptune and Uranus. The processes that lead to the formation of planets in the Solar System are compared to the formation of exoplanets. She also examines whether a uniform mechanism can be found predicting the formation of planets, and the differences among different planetary systems and the physical processes that influence the formation of planets in a particular system.

=== Internal structure of planets and time of internal rotation ===
Helled's research group also examines the internal structure of planets and their composition. Computational models are developed to predict the dynamic behaviour of a planet and compare it with existing observations. The team is investigating the velocities of the gas giants' internal rotation and whether their structures can be related to the atmospheric movement of these planets.

=== Calculating the rotation periods of Saturn, Uranus and Neptune ===
In 2010, Helled and collaborators suggested that the rotation periods of both Uranus and Neptune are in fact unknown. They suggested that the lengths of day on the ice giants are ≈16.58 hr (Uranus) and 17.46 (Neptune). In 2015, Helled and collaborators accurately calculated Saturn's rotation time (10 hours, 32 minutes, 45 seconds). The previous calculation was based on measurements of the Voyager 2 probe in 1981. However, calculations from the Cassini probe showed that there is a discrepancy in numbers and a gap in the understanding and calculating of Saturn's rotation time. The problem is that the components of Saturn's atmosphere, especially hydrogen and helium, travel at different speeds and do not attest to Saturn's own rotation. Helled's research determined the speed of rotation by measuring Saturn's gravitational field and calculating its density and oblateness (the fact that its polar diameter is smaller than its equatorial diameter).

=== Obstacles to the movement of winds in Uranus and Neptune ===
Together with Yohai Kaspi and Oded Aaronson of the Weizmann Institute of Science, Adam Schumann, and Bill Hubbard of the University of Arizona, Helled succeeded in calculating that the strong winds blowing over Neptune and Uranus are limited to an atmospheric layer whose depth is not more than 1,000 km. On Neptune, these winds blow at speeds of about 2,000 km/h, with storms and strong jet currents. Since the discovery of these winds by the Voyager 2 probe, researchers have been trying to find out the extent of the phenomenon of wind, in order to better understand the composition of these ice giants. The team modelled the influence of the winds on the gravitational field of the planets to show that the jet currents constitute only a small percentage of the planet's mass. The movement of the winds changes the momentary mass of the planet and thus causes a fluctuation in its gravitational field. By calculating the relationship between pressure and density for the wind pattern and measuring the torque, they proved that the wind layer is limited to 1,000 km thick and constitutes only a few percent of the planet's mass. The researchers were able to create a map of the gravitational field of the planets based on wind data.

== Selected publications ==
- Helled, Ravit; Anderson, John D.; Podolak, Morris; Schubert, Gerald (2010-12-09). "Interior Models of Uranus and Neptune". The Astrophysical Journal. 726 (1): 15. arXiv:1010.5546. doi:10.1088/0004-637x/726/1/15. ISSN 0004-637X.
- Henning, Thomas K.; Dullemond, Cornelis Petrus; Klessen, Ralf S.; Beuther, Henrik (2014), "Giant Planet Formation, Evolution, and Internal Structure", Protostars and Planets VI, University of Arizona Press, pp. 643–666, arXiv:1311.1142, Bibcode:2014prpl.conf..643H, doi:10.2458/azu_uapress_9780816531240-ch028, ISBN 978-0-8165-9876-2
- Helled, Ravit; Schubert, Gerald (2008-08-20). "Core formation in giant gaseous protoplanets". Icarus. 198 (1): 156–162. arXiv:0808.2787. Bibcode:2008Icar..198..156H. doi:10.1016/j.icarus.2008.08.002. ISSN 0019-1035.
- Helled, Ravit; Galanti, Eli; Kaspi, Yohai (2015-04-09). "Saturn's fast spin determined from its gravitational field and oblateness". Nature. 520 (7546): 202–204. arXiv:1504.02561. Bibcode:2015Natur.520..202H. doi:10.1038/nature14278. ISSN 1476-4687. PMID 25807487.
- Helled, R.; Lunine, J. (2014-05-19). "Measuring Jupiter's water abundance by Juno: the link between interior and formation models". Monthly Notices of the Royal Astronomical Society. 441 (3): 2273–2279. arXiv:1403.2891. doi:10.1093/mnras/stu516. ISSN 0035-8711.

== Awards and recognition ==
- Selected among the 50 most influential women of Forbes Israel (2015)
- Selected among the 50 influential women of Globes (2016)
- Selected in the list of the 40 most promising young people of the year by Globes (2016)
- The Mako site selected her as one of its most influential people in Israel (2016)
- The 2024 Farinella Prize for her outstanding contributions to research into ‘the internal structure of planetary bodies: clues on formation processes of the Solar System’.
