= NEO-MAPP =

NEO-MAPP (Near-Earth-Object Modelling and Payloads for Protection) is a project for studying planetary defence and asteroid exploration.

This project is focused on two main topics, that are: on one side, maturation of existing digital modelisation capacities of various process governing asteroids evolution (impact, dynamic, structural evolution) and its adaptation to specific use cases, and, on the other side, development of instruments, technologies and data exploitation models linked to it, in order to support space missions towards near-Earth-objects.

== Presentation ==
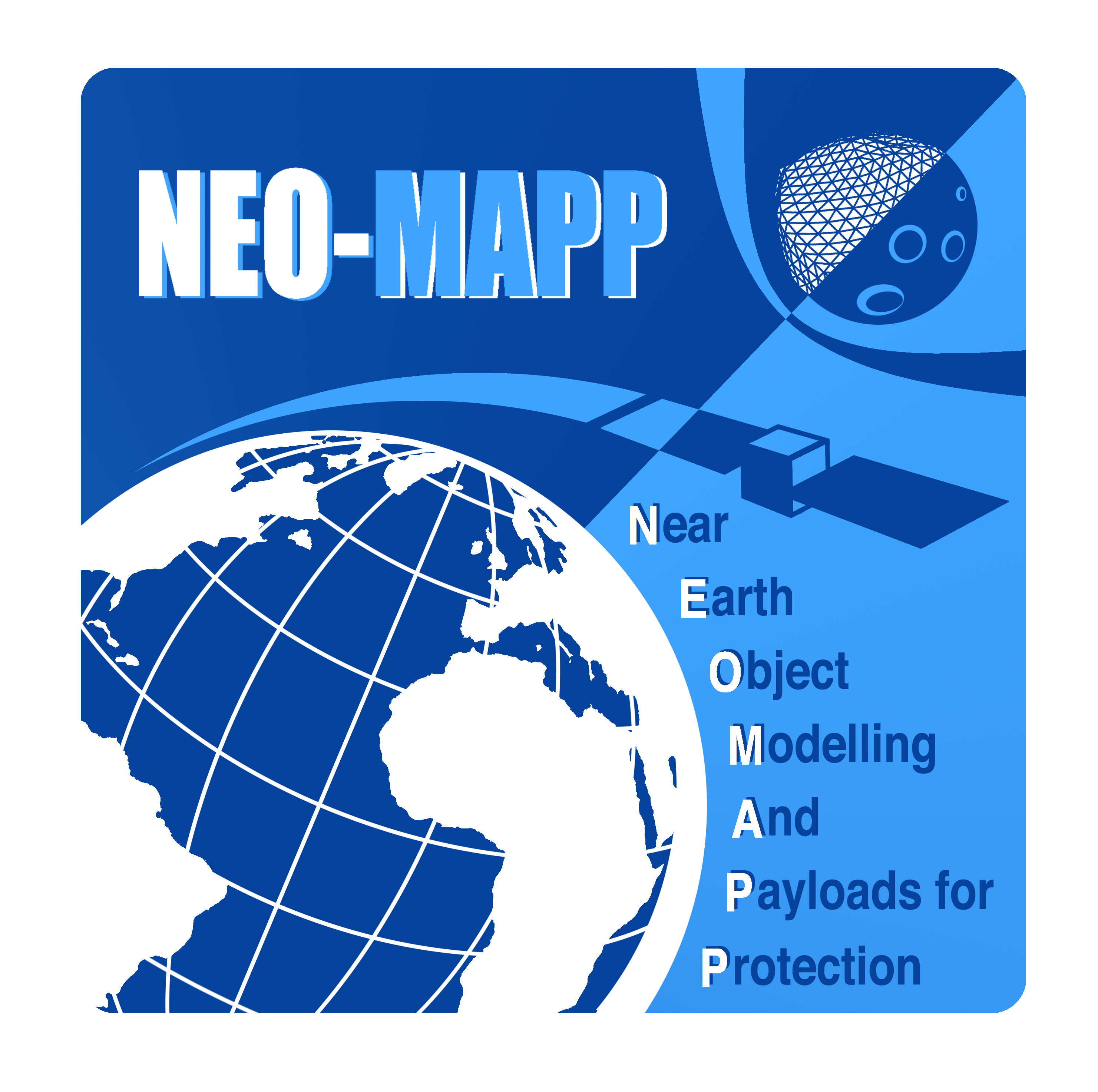
The Horizon 2020 NEO-MAPP Project logo

The NEO-MAPP project, financed by the European Commission through its Horizon 2020 programme, is coordinated by the French Centre National de la Recherche Scientifique (CNRS) and its coordinator Patrick Michel, from Lagrange Laboratory, who is also the Principal Investigator of ESA's Hera space mission, the reference mission of the project.

The reference mission of the NEO-MAPP project is the Hera mission, currently under development under the Space Security programme at the European Space Agency (ESA), which will be launched in October 2024 with aim to measure impact results of the NASA's DART mission on satellite Dimorphos, part of the double asteroid (65803) Didymos.

Hera will also characterize the entire physical properties and composition of the double asteroid, including for the first time, internal properties. NEO-MAPP activities therefore accompany the Hera mission development, both in term of digital modellisation than in term of developing some instruments aboard the probe and analysis tools obtain by the mission. Most of the science team members of Hera mission are also members of NEO-MAPP. The main NEO-MAPP goal is to provide significant advances, both on understanding the response of asteroids to external forces (in particular to kinetic impact or to immediate approach of a planet), and in associated measures carried out by a space craft (including those necessary to physical and dynamical characterization in general).

Several communities are interested in asteroids for pour various reasons, from Science to planetary defence and even business objectives (for instance mining, resource extraction and exploitation). Given the principle scientific and technological sharing, all these communities are seeking knowledge and means of asteroid property modelisations, as well as capacity to achieve operations at close proximity of a celestial small body and to obtain relevant measures. Multidisciplinary approach at the heart of NEO-MAPP offers the possibility to accomplish significant advances on each of these aspects.

The most threatening asteroids with a trajectory crossing the Earth orbit – in terms of collisions frequency with Earth – are the smallest, the ones whose size is below 1 km. However, this is least humankind-known population, due to the fact that ground observations does not allow us to obtain measures of its physical properties at a required level of detail.

== Project partners ==
The NEO-MAPP consortium consists of a grouping of European research institutes and of two space industries in Europe. Most of the consortium members have collaborated, under the auspices of the ESA, in exploration project of the Solar System, have responsibilities within the science team of the Hera mission, and are involved in space missions towards small bodies of other pace agencies (for instance the NASA's or the JAXA's). Furthermore, some project partners were before that members of PF7 NEOShield and/or H2020 NEOShield-2 European programmes.

Here are the 15 partners of the project :

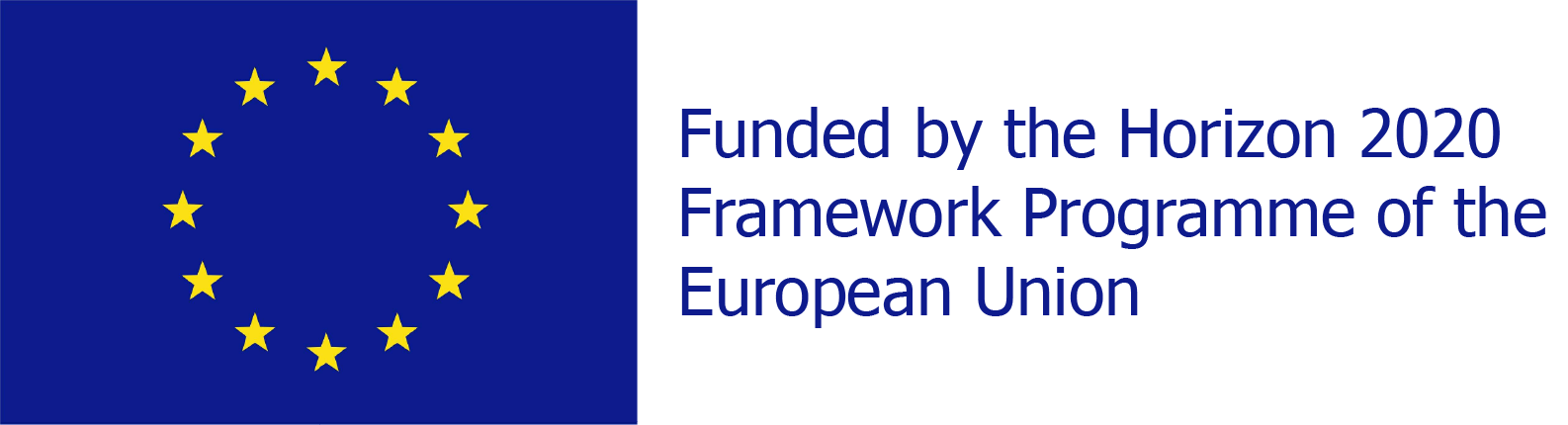
The Horizon 2020 logo, the framework programme of the European Union.

- Centre National de la Recherche Scientifique, CNRS (Laboratoire Joseph Louis Lagrange, France)
- Asteroid Foundation (Luxembourg)
- Airbus Defence and Space (Germany)
- Aristotelio Panepistimio Thessalonikis (Greece)
- Deutsches Zentrum für Luft- und Raumfahrt, DLR (Germany)
- FCiencias.ID – Associacao para a Investigacao e Desenvolvimento de Ciencias (Portugal)
- GMV S.A. (Portugal)
- Instituto de Astrofisica de Canarias (Spain)
- Institut Supérieur de l'Aéronautique et de l'Espace, ISAE (France)
- Museum für Naturkunde Berlin (Germany)
- Observatoire Royal de Belgique (Belgium)
- University of Alicante (Espagne)
- Universität Bern (Suisse)
- ALMA MATER STUDIORUM - Università di Bologna (Italy)
- Université Grenoble Alpes (France)

Members of partner institutes contributing to work modules with a scientific vocation are experts in impact process, in dynamic evolution of NEOs, and in modelisation of their physical properties, including their internal structures. This consortium includes partners having an experience in developing relevant technologies and space missions systems. Public outreach to all these activities is supervised by a partner whose experience and efficiency has been proven through the increasing success of Asteroid Day, which they organize every year since its creation in 2015. Some partnership are overlapping in terms of research field and in competences, which ensures a good and necessary synergy between the various work modules.

== Advisory board ==
The NEO-MAPP project is led by a seven member-advisory board.

Dr. Brian May (Queen band guitarist and co-founder of the Asteroid Day movement) assists the project on the outreach side toward general public by producing image pairs and stereoscopic films of the digital modelisations of the project, allowing them to be visualised in 3D.

Ian Carnelli is the Hera mission manager at ESA, Dr. Michael Kueppers is the Hera mission ESA scientist, Dr. Aurélie Moussi is a small bodies mission CNES expert, Dr. Andy Cheng is one of the leader of NASA's DART mission at Johns Hopkins University's Applied Physic Laboratory (APL), Dr. Paul Abell is a small bodies expert representing NASA and Pr. Makoto Yoshikawa is JAXA's Hayabusa2 mission manager.

== Results ==
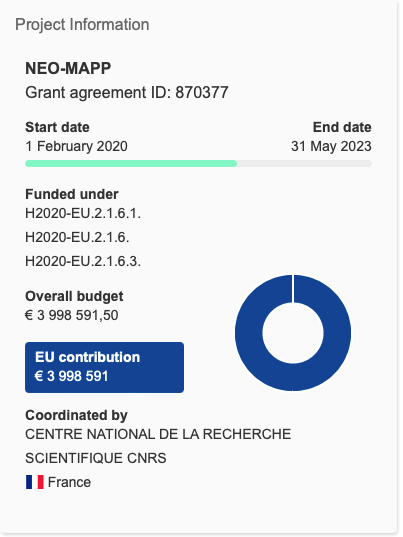
Information on Project NEO-MAPP

The project has led to increased understanding of NEOs while yielding profit and increasing progress in the expertise European scientists and engineers, both in terms of efforts dedicated to planetary defence and to small bodies exploration.

Therefore, project members participate in publishing of several articles in peer-reviewed journals among them Science, Nature Astronomy, Nature Communications, Astronomy & Astrophysics and Icarus.

== Public Outreach ==
The project has also given itself the objective to increase media coverage of scientific space research dedicated to planetary defence, public outreach (in particular among the youngest and science and engineering students) to impact risks and coverage of this global risk by the European scientific community, admittedly at low probability but factually at high consequence for Earth, by the combination of videos published on its website and by interventions in the medias.

== Going Beyond ==
=== Bibliography ===
- Michel, P., Cheng, A., Küppers, M., Pravec, P., Blum, J., Delbo, M., Green, S.F., Rosenblatt, R., Tsiganis, K., Vincent, J.B., Biele, J., Ciarletti, V., Hérique, A., Ulamec, S., Carnelli, I., Galvez, A., Benner, L., Naidu, S.P., Barnouin, O.S., Richardson, D.C., Rivkin, A., Scheirich, P., Moskovitz, N., Thirouin, A., Schwartz, S.R., Campo Bagatin, A., Yu, Y. 2016. Science case for the Asteroid Impact Mission (AIM): a component of the Asteroid Impact & Deflection Assessment (AIDA) Mission. Advances in Space Research 57, 2529–2547.
- Michel, P., Kueppers, M., Sierks, H., Carnelli, I., Cheng, A.F., Mellab, K., Granvik, M., Kestilä, A., Kohout, T., Muinonen, K., Näsilä, A., Penttilä, A., Tikka, T., Tortora, P., Ciarletti, V., Hérique, A., Murdoch, N., Asphaug, E., Rivkin, A., Barnouin, O.S., Campo Bagatin, A., Pravec, P., Richardson, D.C., Schwartz, S.R., Tsiganis, K., Ulamec, S., Karatekin, O. 2018. European component of the AIDA mission to a binary asteroid: characterization and interpretation of the impact of the DART mission. Advances in Space Research 62, 2261–2272.
- Mariella Graziano, Monica Lazzarin, Richard Moissl, P. Michel, M. Küppers, F. Topputo et Ö. Karatekin (26 avril 2021) « Session 1: Hera [archive] » (pdf) in 7th IAA Planetary Defense Conference : 57 p., Vienna, Austria: United Nations. — The mission detailed presentation (objectives, technical characteristics, procedure) at l'UNOOSA in 2021 (PowerPoint).
- Michel, P., Küppers, M., Campo Bagatin, A., Carry, B., Charnoz, S., De Leon, J., Fitzsimmons, A., Gordo, P., Green, S.F., Hérique, A., Jutzi, M., Karatekin, Ö., Kohout, T., Lazzarin, M., Murdoch, N., Okada, T., Palomba, E., Pravec, P., Snodgrass, C., Tortora, P., Tsiganis, K., Ulamec, S., Vincent, J.-B., Wünnemann, K., Zhang, Y., Raducan, S. D., Dotto, E., Chabot, N., Cheng, A. F., Rivkin, A., Barnouin, O., Ernst, C., Stickle, A., Richardson, D. C., Thomas, C., Arakawa, M., Miyamoto, H., Nakamura, A., Sugita, S., Yoshikawa, M., Abell, P., Asphaug, E., Ballouz, R.-L., Bottke, Jr., W. F., Lauretta, D. S., Walsh, K. J., Martino, P. and Carnelli, I. 2022. The ESA Hera Mission: Detailed Characterization of the DART Impact Outcome and of the Binary Asteroid (65803) Didymos. The Planetary Science Journal, Volume 3, Number 7 (on open access).
- Asteroid IV.

=== Related articles ===
- DART
- Hera (space mission)
- AIDA
- NEO
- (65803) Didymos and Dimorphos - double asteroid crushed by DART and to be explored by Hera.
- Impactor (spacecraft)
- Asteroid Impact Avoidance

=== External links ===
- Center for Near Earth Object Studies (CNEOS) – Jet Propulsion Laboratory, NASA
- Table of Asteroids Next Closest Approaches to the Earth – Sormano Astronomical Observatory
- IAU Minor Planet Center
- Current Map Of The Solar System – Armagh Observatory
- The Hera mission scientists website

=== Videos ===
- Youtube channel of the NEO-MAPP project.
