= Patrick Michel =

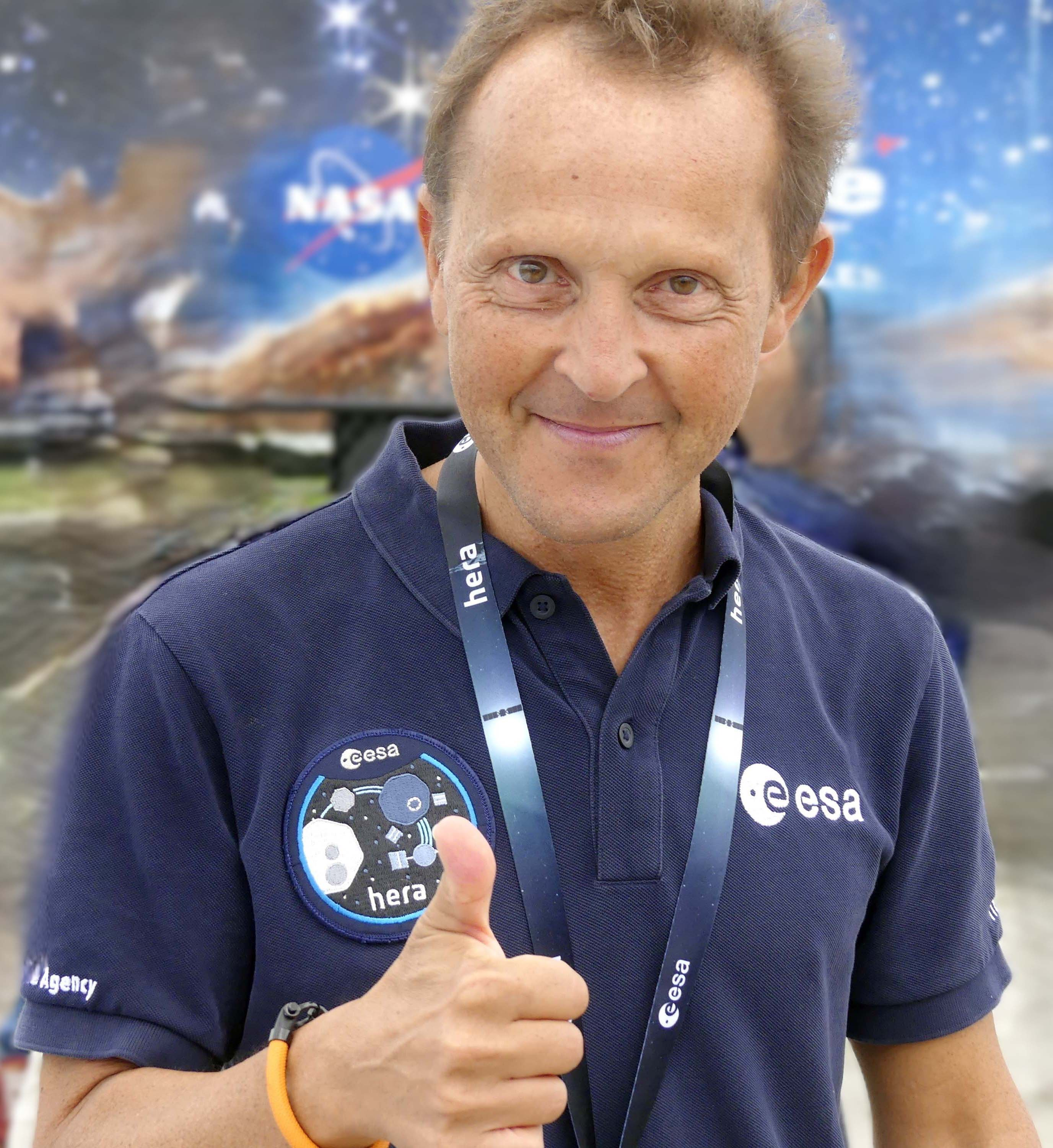
- Michel, after the ESA Hera spacecraft launch aboard at SpaceX Falcon 9 rocket, at Cape Canaveral, Fla., on 7 October 2024
- Born: February 25, 1970; Saint-Tropez, France
- Citizenship: French
- Education: Université Nice-Sophia-Antipolis
- Scientific career
- Fields: astrophysics, planetary science, space missions
- Workplaces: Centre National de la Recherche Scientifique European Space Agency
- Thesis: Dynamical evolution of Near-Earth Asteroids (1997)
- Website: http://www.obs-nice.fr/michel

Patrick Michel (born 25 February 1970 in Saint-Tropez, France) is a French planetary scientist, Senior Researcher Exceptionnal Class at CNRS (Centre National de la Recherche Scientifique), Project Scientist at the European Space Agency (in the Human and Robotic Exploration programme) and working within the Lagrange laboratory, itself under the supervision of Université Côte d'Azur, Côte d'Azur Observatory and CNRS, in Nice (France). He is also a Global Fellow of the University of Tokyo.

== Career ==
Michel began his advanced education with a degree in Aeronautical Engineering and Space Techniques in 1993 at ESTACA. He holds a Diplôme d’Études Approfondies (French for advanced studies diploma) in Imaging, Astronomy, and High Angular Resolution since 1994 and he received his PhD in 1997 for a thesis titled "Dynamical evolution of Near-Earth Asteroids", both at Université de Nice Sophia-Antipolis. He then obtained his Habilitation à Diriger des Recherches (French for accreditation to supervise research) in 2004. Recruited at the CNRS in 1999 as a Chargé de Recherche, he was promoted to the Corps des Directeurs de Recherche in 2010. He is afterwards promoted to Director of Research in Exceptional Class in 2025. He is a specialist in the physical properties and evolution of asteroids, the process of collisions between small celestial bodies and the behavior of their surfaces under the appropriate gravity conditions. His research is mainly carried out by the development of massive numerical simulations of the processes involved (impacts, surface movements made of granular material, gravitational evolution). He also contributes to the development of experiments, in laboratory or in micro-gravity, whose purpose is to validate numerical simulations before applying them to astrophysical problems at scales inaccessible in the laboratory (e.g. asteroids with kilometric sizes). He has scientific responsibility or is heavily involved in space missions to asteroids, launched, under development and planned. He also participates in international forums dedicated to planetary defence and the development of a coordinated response to the risk of asteroid impact. He actively contributes to the mediatisation of knowledge in these fields by participating in television, radio and internet broadcasts, giving numerous conferences and writing articles in mainstream newspapers and encyclopaedias. He is editor-in-chief of the book Asteroids IV, published in December 2015 (University of Arizona Press), which reviews the science of asteroids in 42 chapters and serves as a reference for students and researchers during the current decade, and two public books in French devoted to asteroids and planetary defense, published by Odile Jacob's.

== Academic topics ==
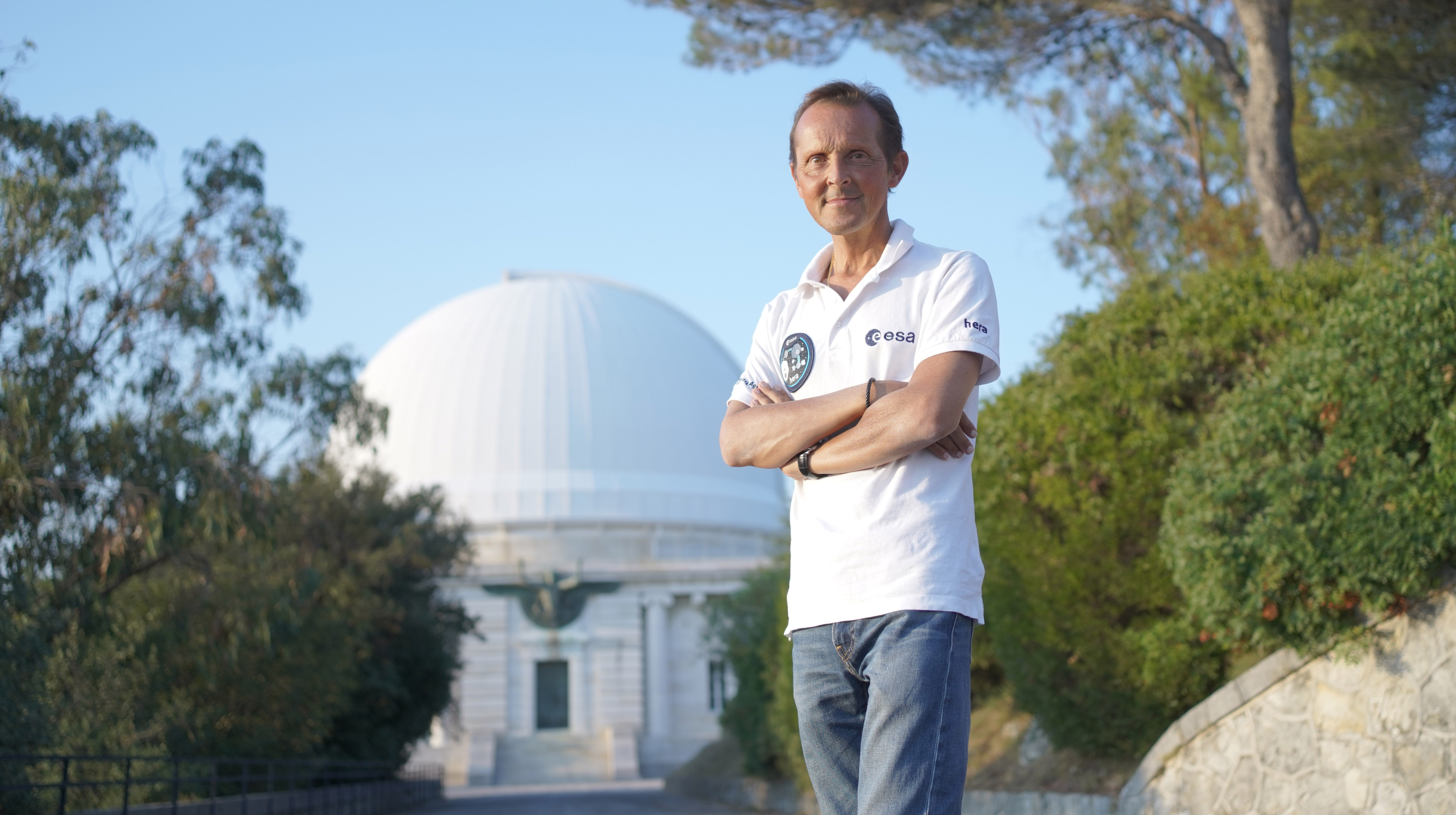
Patrick Michel, Côte d'Azur Observatory, 2020.

He is specialist of the physical properties and the collisional and dynamical evolution of asteroids. His researches focus on the collisional processes between asteroids, the origin of near-Earth objects, binary asteroids, their physical properties, their response to various processes (impacts, tidal encounters, shaking) as a function of their internal and surface properties, and the risks of impacts with the Earth.

His work was notably the first to produce simulations that fully represent the process of an asteroid's destruction by collision with another object, calculating not only the fragmentation of the asteroid due to the impact but also the gravitational interactions of the fragments formed and their possible re-accumulations. The numerical simulations by Patrick Michel and his colleagues confirmed in particular that asteroid families (around twenty distinct groups of objects identified in the region between Mars and Jupiter, known as the asteroid belt) are each the result of the destruction of a parent body (up to several hundred kilometres in diameter). They also suggest that most second-generation asteroids (derived from a larger body) are aggregates rather than monolithic rocks, which explains the low bulk densities measured by observations.

His results have been the subject of more than 600 publications, 108000 reads and 18000 citations in refereed international journals, and have been featured on the covers of both Science in 2001 and Nature in 2003.

In particular, Patrick contributed to the development of a digital model of porous body fragmentation (comets, carbonaceous asteroids), validated by laboratory impact experiments conducted in Japan. His research published in Nature in 2008 also provided an explanation for the origin of small binary asteroids, which make up 15% of the asteroid population, and their particular physical properties, notably the shape of the central body.

== Participations in spacecraft missions ==
Michel is also deeply involved in several space missions and mission concepts devoted to the investigation of the Solar System small bodies and asteroid hazard, also known as planetary defence.

=== NEOMAP committee and Don Quijote ===
He belongs to the Near-Earth Object Mission Advisory Panel (NEOMAP) mandated by European Space Agency (ESA) to recommend space missions devoted to a better understanding of the impact threat. In 2004, the committee recommends the Don Quijote mission concept, which consists in making a test of asteroid deflection by using the technique of an artificial impactor. This mission was studied at ESA until 2007.

=== MarcoPolo-R ===
He was a co-chair of the science study team of the MarcoPolo-R sample return mission during the assessment study phase (2011-2014) selected by ESA's Cosmic Vision programme (2015-2025). The objective was to bring back a sample from a primitive near-Earth asteroid in partnership with NASA. The pre-phase A study took place from 2011 to 2014, but ESA did not select the project for launch.

=== AIDA, DART, AIM and Hera ===
While Dr Andy Cheng is leading the American science team, Michel is leading the European science team of AIDA, for Asteroid Impact and Deflection Assessment, an international space cooperation inspired by Don Quijote, a collaboration between ESA and NASA aimed at deflecting the secondary of the binary near-Earth asteroid Didymos using a kinetic impactor.

After an unsuccessful attempt with AIM, Patrick becomes then the principal investigator for the approved ESA's Hera mission, which will measure the impact of NASA's DART mission as part of this first deflection test of Dimorphos that happened on 26 September 2022. The European mission will therefore measure for the first time the results of a very high-speed impact (size and morphology of the crater) and the internal properties of an asteroid that will be the smallest asteroid ever visited, with Dimorphos measuring about 160 metres in diameter. Patrick is also a member of the DART mission team.

=== Hayabusa2 and OSIRIS-REx ===
Michel is a co-I on both the JAXA Hayabusa2 and NASA OSIRIS-REx sample return missions to a primitive near-Earth asteroid. Hayabusa2 was launched in 2014 and OSIRIS-REx in 2016.

=== MMX ===
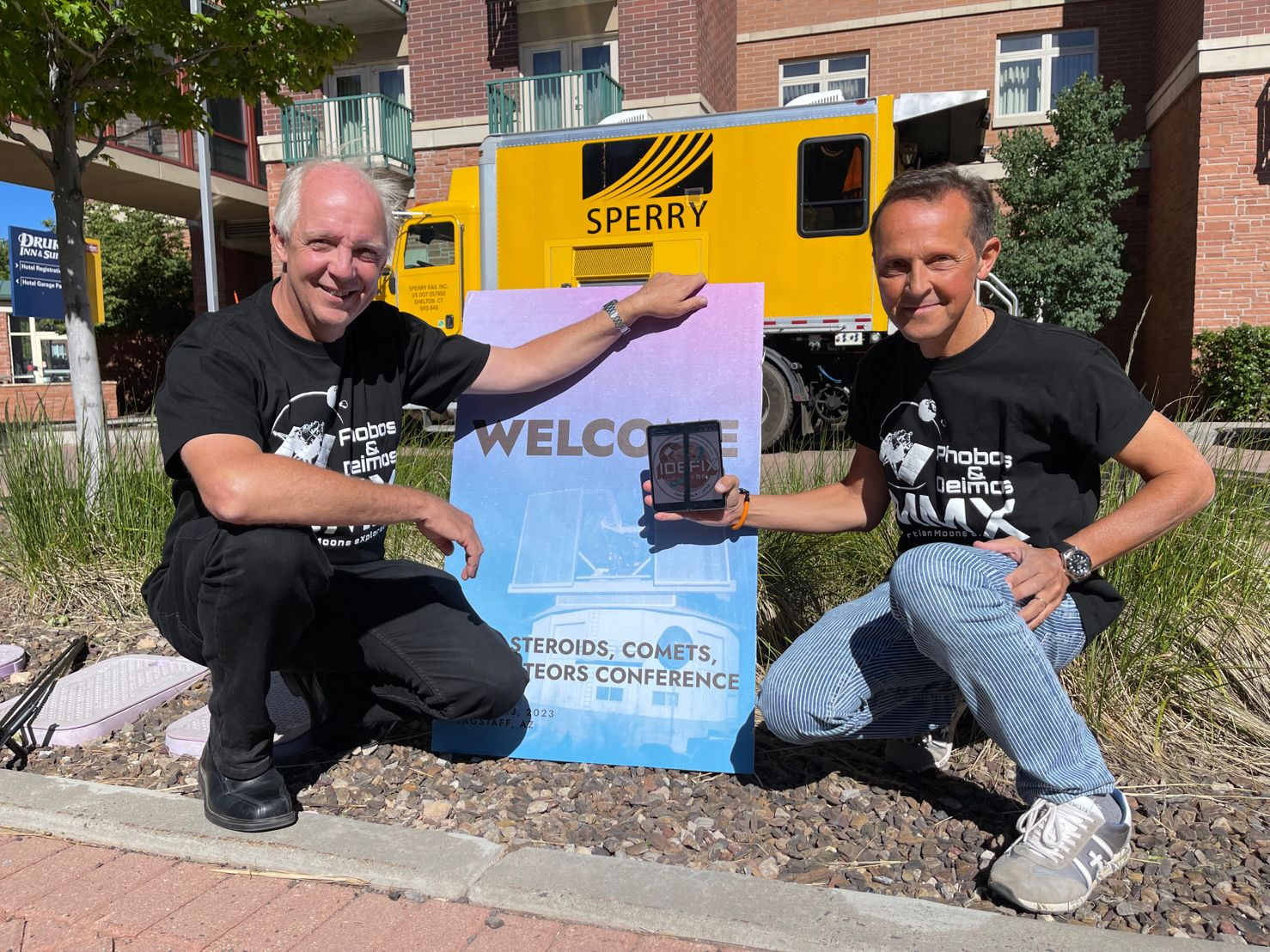
Stephan Ulamec and Michel in 2023 in Flagstaff, Arizona, celebrating the naming of Idefix

Together with Stephan Ulamec, they are the co-Principal Investigators of Idefix, the rover developed in partnership by CNES and DLR for the JAXA Martian Moons eXploration mission to return samples from Phobos, a moon of Mars, which will be launched in 2026 to arrive on Phobos in 2029 and return to Earth in 2031, with a deployment of the rover to perform in-situ surface analyses in 2028.

=== Rapid Apophis Mission for Space Safety (Ramses) ===
Together with Monica Lazzarin, Michel is the co-PI of the proposed ESA Ramses mission, a spacecraft that would rendezvous with (99942) Apophis before it passes Earth on Friday, 13 April 2029 and accompany the asteroid during the flyby to observe how it is warped and changed by our planet’s gravity. In 2025, this programme has received permission to begin preparatory work. He is also the ESA project scientist of the mission.

== Participations to activities financed by the European Commission ==
=== NEOShield and NEOShield-2 ===
He is also responsible of the Work Package on numerical simulations of collisions and asteroid deflection by a kinetic impactor in the European Consortiums NEOShield and NEOShield-2 funded, respectively, by the FP7 and the Horizon2020 framework programmes (2012-2017).

=== NEO-MAPP ===
He is the coordinator of the NEO-MAPP project, also under the Horizon2020 framework programme (2020-2023).

== Roles in French and international organisations ==
He has wide involvement in international organisations and belongs to the Science Program Committee of CNES (French space agency).

He has been elected Secretary of the Division 3 (Planetary Science) of the International Astronomical Union (IAU) in 2009-2012.

He also belongs to the Action Team 14 (AT14) of the COPUOS (for Committee On the Peaceful Uses of Outer Space) at the United Nations aimed at recommending actions and an international organisation to deal with the asteroid impact threat and to the Steering Committee of the International Asteroid Warning Network (IAWN) recommended by AT14, since it started in 2014. He is also representing IAWN within the Space Mission Planning Advisory Group (SMPAG).

In 2023, he was first elected a Corresponding Member, then a full Member since June 2025, of the International Academy of Astronautics.

In 2024, he was elected to the Small Bodies Assessment Group (SBAG), a NASA committee. The SBAG's aim is to identify scientific priorities and opportunities for the exploration of asteroids, comets, interplanetary dust, small satellites, and Trans-Neptunian Objects.

Until 2024 he was the leader of his planetology team within the Joseph-Louis Lagrange Laboratory.

== Media ==
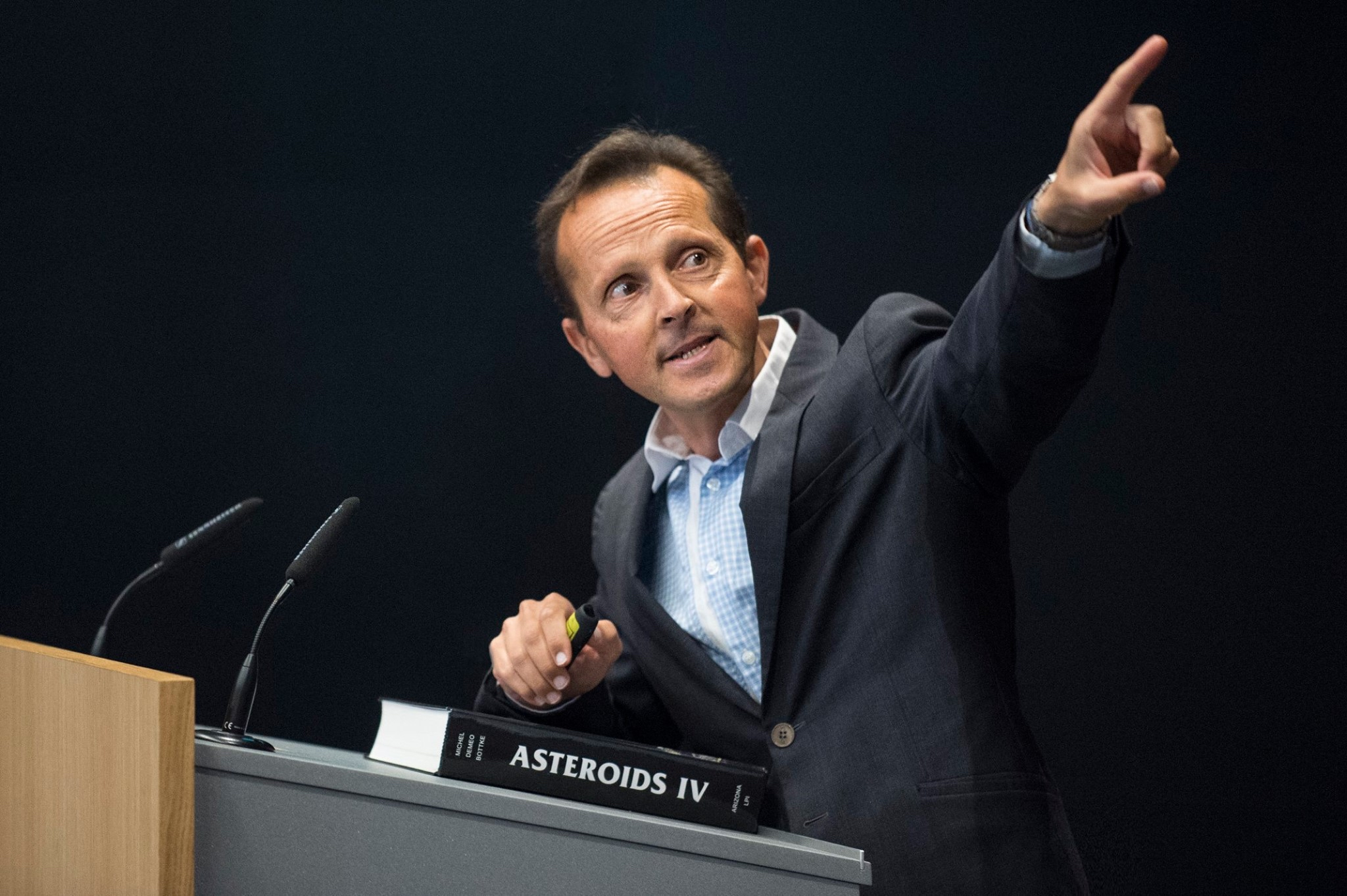
Patrick Michel with his book Asteroids IV, 2017.

He actively contributes to public outreach and is regularly solicited by various media to participate in French and English TV shows, radio shows and magazine interviews, and to contribute to the writing of papers in popular journals and encyclopedias, on topics related to small celestial body hazards, space missions and planetary formation (cf. external links).

Michel is the lead editor of the book Asteroids IV published in 2015 by the University of Arizona Press.

In 2023, he is the author in French of an outreach science book called "A la rencontre des astéroïdes : missions spatiales et défense de la planète" that can be translated into "Encountering asteroids: space missions and defending the planet". In 2026, he published a second French public science book called "La Défense planétaire contre les astéroïdes", for "Planetary defence against the asteroids". His first book was prefaced by Jean-François Clervoy and his second by Sir D^{r} Brian May.

Since 2024, he is contributing to a French podcast called Astroroches, discussing topics related to the little bodies, like their properties, their role in the history of the Solar System, planetary defence, and the space missions dedicated to them.

== Awards ==
In 1999 Asteroid (7561) PatrickMichel was named in his honour by the International Astronomical Union (IAU).

In 2006 he received the "Young Researcher" prize from the French Society of Astronomy and Astrophysics.

In 2012, he was awarded the Carl Sagan Medal from the American Astronomical Society and the Silver Medal of Saint-Tropez.

In 2013 he was awarded the International Prize Paolo Farinella in Planetary Science from the University of Pisa in recognition of his work on the collisional process.

He got the NASA Silver Medal Achievement for his contribution to the United States space mission OSIRIS-REx.

In 2022 he was given both the Nice Gold Medal and the Nice Silver Eagle Garland.

In 2023 he was awarded the Saint-Tropez Gold Medal and the Honorary Citizen Medal of Ollioules.

By decree of the French Republic of 2 December 2025, Patrick Michel was promoted to the rank of Knight in the French National Order of Merit. Philippe Baptiste, Minister of higher education, research and space offcially pinned the knight medal on Patrick on October, 27th, 2026. The same day, The French Sciences Academy gave him the CNES Prize of Astrophysics and Space Science at Paris' Institut de France.
