= Marguerite Laugier =

French astronomer (1896–1976)

Asteroids discovered: 21
1247 Memoria	30 August 1932
1426 Riviera	1 April 1937
1461 Jean-Jacques	30 December 1937
1651 Behrens	23 April 1936
1681 Steinmetz	23 November 1948
1690 Mayrhofer	8 November 1948
1730 Marceline	17 October 1936
1755 Lorbach	8 November 1936
1884 Skip	2 March 1943
2068 Dangreen	8 January 1948
2106 Hugo	21 October 1936
2384 Schulhof	2 March 1943
2393 Suzuki	17 November 1955
2677 Joan	25 March 1935
3220 Murayama	22 November 1951
3568 ASCII	17 October 1936
4649 Sumoto	20 December 1936
4909 Couteau	28 September 1949
6887 Hasuo	24 November 1951
10449 Takuma	16 October 1936
(20959) 1936 UG	21 October 1936

Marguerite Laugier (née Lhomme) (12 September 1896 – 10 June 1976) was a French astronomer active at the Nice Observatory from the 1930s to the 1950s. Contemporary astronomical articles refer to her as "Madame Laugier".

The Minor Planet Center credits her with the discovery of 21 numbered asteroids, made between 1932 and 1955.

Marguerite Laugier maintained international correspondence with professional and amateur astronomers, which is reflected in the various asteroid names attributed to her contacts.

In 1939, she was awarded the Lalande Prize for her work.

The outer main-belt asteroid 1597 Laugier, discovered by Louis Boyer at Algiers in 1949, is named in her honor (M.P.C. 4418).

Note: She is not to be confused with a male "M. Laugier" in 19th century literature, where the M. stands for "Monsieur". This refers to Paul Auguste Ernest Laugier (1812–1872).
