= Nice Observatory =

Astronomical observatory in Nice, France

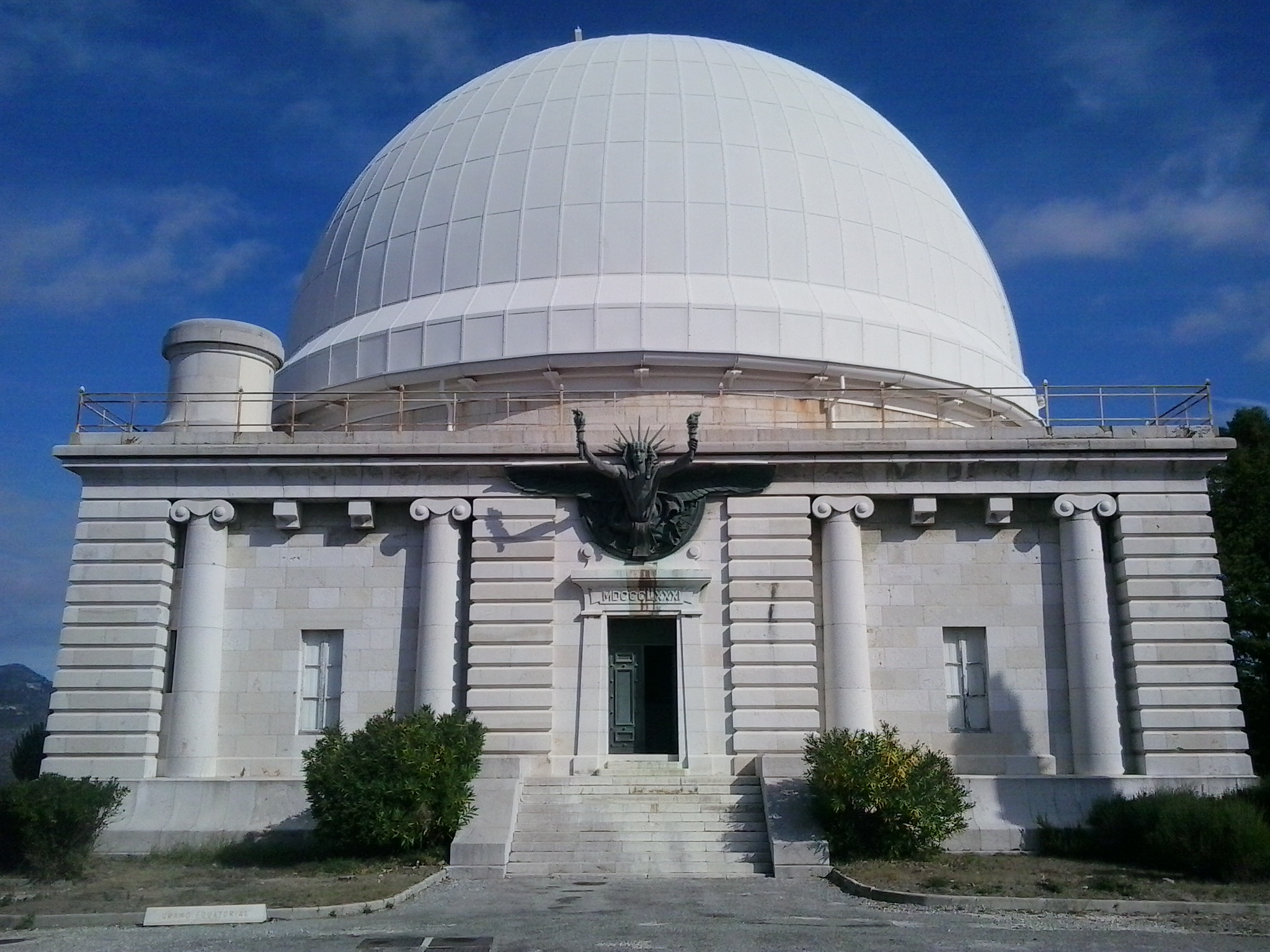
- The Nice Observatory
- Alternative names: 020 NI
- Named after: City of Nice
- Organization: Observatory of the Côte d'Azur
- Observatory code: 020
- Location: Mont Gros, Nice, Alpes-Maritimes, France
- Coordinates: 43°43′39″N 7°17′57″E
- Altitude: 372 m (1,220 ft)
- Weather: Mediterranean climate
- Established: 1878
- Website: www.oca.eu
- Architect: Charles Garnier

Telescopes
- Grande Lunette: 77-cm refractor
- Related media on Commons

The Nice Observatory (French: Observatoire de Nice) is an astronomical observatory located in Nice, France, on the summit of Mount Gros. The observatory was founded in 1879, by the banker Raphaël Bischoffsheim. The architect was Charles Garnier, and Gustave Eiffel designed the main dome.

In 1886 the largest refracting (i.e., with an objective lens rather than a mirror) telescope in the World made its debut at Nice Observatory, the Grand Lunette.

== Description ==
The 77 cm (30 in) refractor telescope made by Henry and Gautier became operational around 1886–1887, was the largest in a privately funded observatory, and the first at such high altitude (325 m or 1,066 ft above sea level). It was slightly bigger in aperture, several metres longer, and located at a higher altitude than the new (1885) 76 cm (30 in) at Pulkovo observatory in the Russian Empire, and the 68 cm (27 in) at Vienna Observatory (completed early 1880s). In the records for the largest refracting telescopes, all three were outperformed by the 91 cm (36 in) refractor installed at the Lick Observatory at 1,283 m altitude in 1889.

== History ==
The first studies for the construction of the observatory began in 1878. Raphaël Bischoffsheim, a banker passionate about science and astronomy, purchased the summit of Mont-Gros to establish an observatory. He enlisted his friend Charles Garnier to lead the architectural project. Garnier, drawing on his background in botany, designed a beautiful landscaped environment. The site consists of 18 pavilions, 13 of which were designed by Charles Garnier. Among the buildings are the large equatorial, the small equatorial housing a 50 cm diameter equatorial instrument that enabled astronomer Auguste Charlois to discover 140 minor planets, the bent equatorial, the large meridian with its two sloped, zenith-opening roofs, and the central pavilion housing a library and researchers' offices. All of these buildings are nestled among the botanical paths of the garden and an olive grove with 250 trees purchased by Garnier.

In 1986, the Nice Observatory merged with the Center for Research in Geodynamics and Astrometry (CERGA) to form the Observatory of the Alpes-Maritimes, which became the Observatory of the Côte d'Azur in 1988.

Since 1988, the observatory site has been listed in the ZNIEFF (Natural Zone of Ecological, Faunistic, and Floristic Interest) inventory of the Provence-Alpes-Côte d'Azur region. The entire site is part of the ZNIEFF titled "Mont-Gros - Eze - Tête de Chien," which spans ten municipalities and covers an area of 2,907 hectares. On July 6, 1992, the site was partially classified as a historic monument, and on October 24, 1994, the buildings were fully classified, including the various telescopes. On March 1, 2001, the observatory received the "20th Century Heritage" label.

== Directors and Associated Personalities ==
The observatory has had the following directors:

- Henri Perrotin (1880–1904)
- General J. A. L. Bassot (1904–1917)
- Gaston Fayet (1917–1962)
- Jean-Claude Pecker (1962–1969)
- Philippe Delache (1969–1972)
- Jean-Paul Zahn (1972–1975)
- Philippe Delache (1975)
- Jean-Paul Zahn (1975–1981)
- Raymond Michard (1981-1989)
- Philippe Delache (1989–1994)
- José Pacheco (1994–1999)
- Jacques Colin (1999–2009)
- Farrokh Vakili (2009–2015)
- Thierry Lanz (2015-2021)
- Stéphane Mazevet (since 2021)

The following notable figures are also associated with its history:

- Auguste Charlois
- Paul Couteau
- Jean-Louis Heudier
- Joanny-Philippe Lagrula
- Marguerite Laugier
- Guy Reiss
- Alexandre Schaumasse
- Henri Chrétien
- Michel Hénon
- François Mignard
- Alessandro Morbidelli
- Patrick Michel.

== The Great Refracting Telescope called the Grande Lunette ==
The main instrument of the Nice Observatory is the refracting telescope housed in the Grand Equatorial. It is 18 meters long, with a 76 cm diameter lens. It became operational for the first time in 1888 and was, at the time, the largest refracting telescope in the world. It was later surpassed by the telescope at the Lick Observatory, which has a 91 cm diameter lens.

== In popular culture ==
The Nice Observatory was featured in the 1999 film Simon Sez. It was also the setting for the title scene in the 2014 Woody Allen flick Magic in the Moonlight.

On May 7, 2021, French artist French79 recorded a concert there, which was broadcast on Arte Concert.

In 2018, the exteriors in front of the Great Dome and the Grand Meridian served as the backdrop for Angèle's music video "La Thune".

In 2022, the band Hyphen Hyphen, originally from Nice, filmed the music video for "Too Young" at the observatory.

== Gallery ==
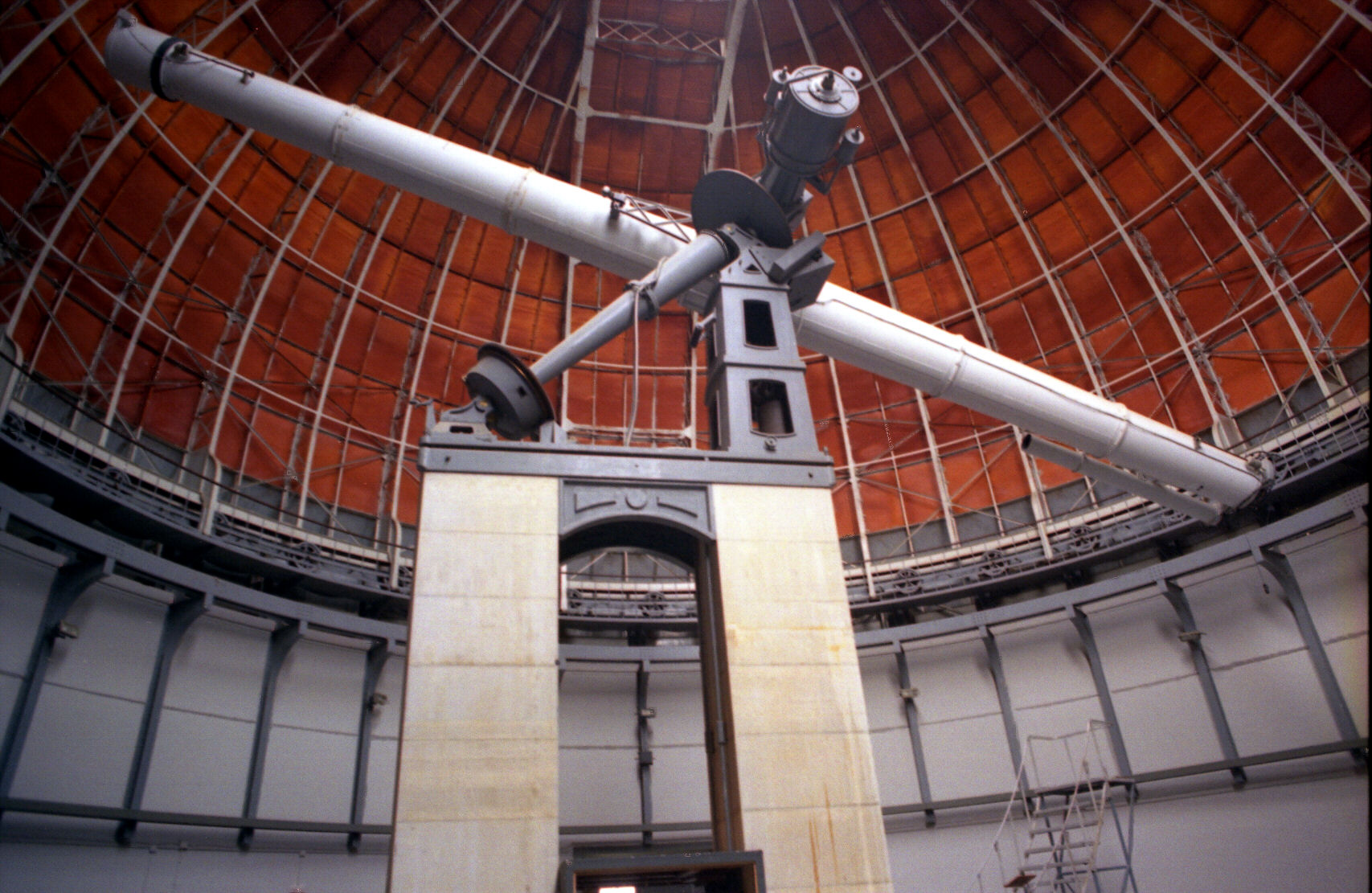
The 77-centimetre (30 in) refractor at Nice Observatory, when built the world's largest, longest, and highest refracting telescope

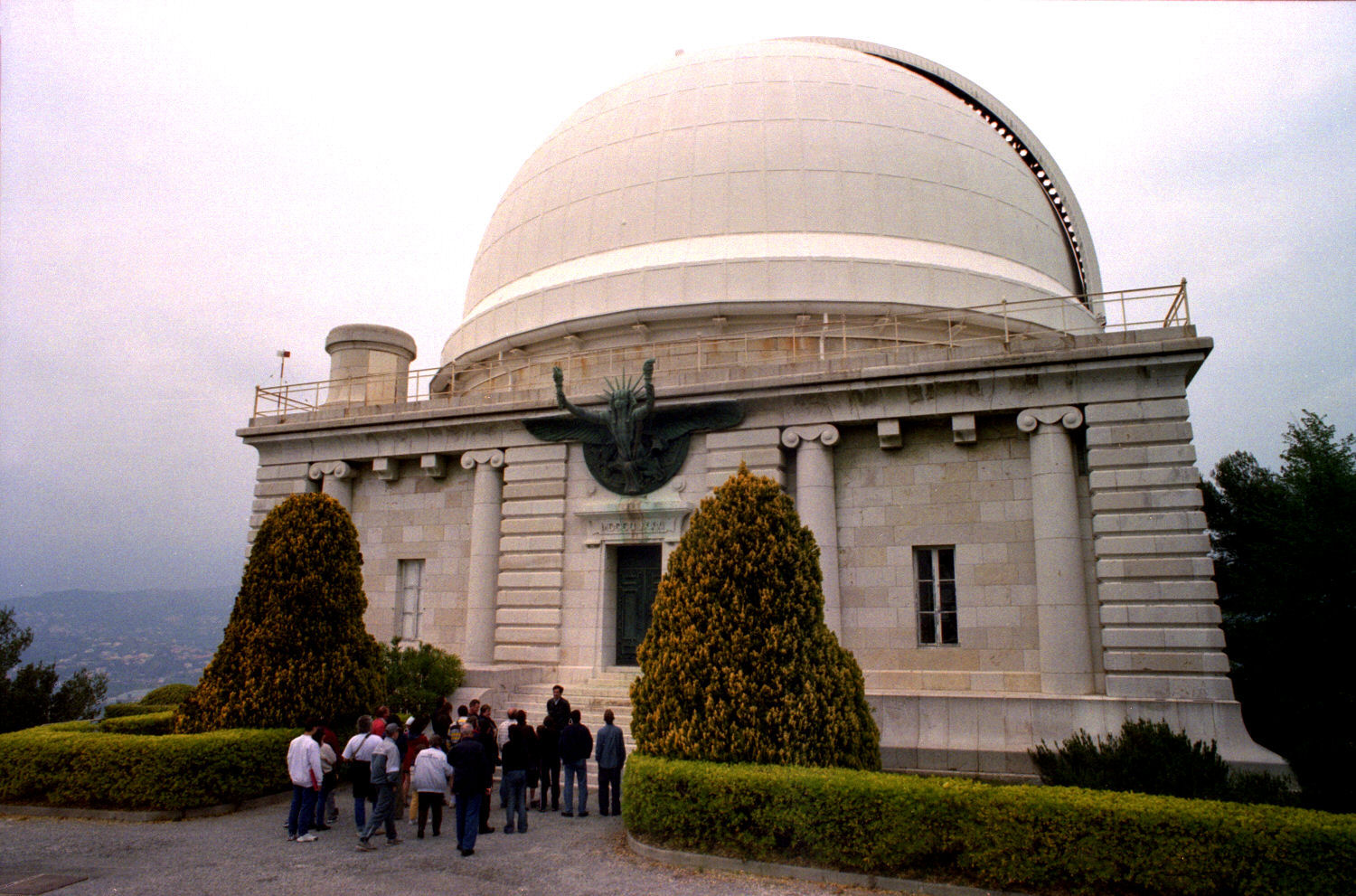
The Bischoffsheim cupola

== See also ==
- List of largest optical refracting telescopes
- List of largest optical reflecting telescopes
- List of astronomical observatories
