= Russian names in space =

Overview of space objects named after Russian people and places

This is a list of space objects and features which were named after Russian people and places:

== Asteroids ==
As of August 2025, there are 118+ asteroids named after Soviet/Russian people and places, most of which are located in the main asteroid belt between Mars and Jupiter

Near-Earth obj.	MBA (inner)	MBA (outer)	Centaur
Mars-crosser	MBA (middle)	Jupiter trojan	Trans-Neptunian obj.
Unclassified

back to top

Named minor planet	Provisional	This minor planet was named for...	Ref · Catalog
232 Russia	A883 BA	Russia	· 232
675 Ludmilla	1908 DU	A character in the opera Ruslan and Lyudmila (1820) by Mikhail Glinka	· 675
749 Malzovia	1913 RF	Nikolai Maltsov	· 749
762 Pulcova	1913 SQ	Pulkovo Observatory, Russia	· 762
769 Tatjana	1913 TA	The heroine of Eugene Onegin (1833) by Aleksandr Pushkin	· 769
779 Nina	1914 UB	Nina N. Neujmina (1877–1956), sister of Grigory Neujmin	· 769
786 Bredichina	1914 UO	Fyodor Bredikhin (1831–1904)	· 786
787 Moskva	1914 UQ	Moscow, Russia	· 787
807 Ceraskia	1915 WY	Vitold Tserasky (1849–1925)	· 807
824 Anastasia	1916 ZH	Anastasia Semenoff	· 824
825 Tanina	1916 ZL	Princess Tanina	· 825
829 Academia	1916 ZY	Russian Academy of Sciences	· 829
830 Petropolitana	1916 ZZ	St. Petersburg, Russia	· 830
847 Agnia	1915 XX	Agnia I. Bad'ina (1877–1956)	· 847
848 Inna	1915 XS	Nikolaevna L. Balanovskaya (1881–1945)	· 848
852 Wladilena	A916 GM	Vladimir Lenin (1870–1924)	· 852
856 Backlunda	A916 GQ	Oskar Backlund (1846–1916)	· 856
857 Glasenappia	A916 GR	Sergey Glazenap (1848–1937)	· 857
882 Swetlana	1917 CM	Svetlana, a Russian feminine name	· 882
969 Leocadia	1921 KZ	Leocadia, a Russian feminine name	· 969
995 Sternberga	1923 NP	Pavel Shternberg (1865–1920)	· 995
1004 Belopolskya	1923 OS	Aristarkh Belopolsky (1854–1934)	· 1004
1007 Pawlowia	1923 OX	Ivan P. Pavlov (1849–1936)	· 1007
1028 Lydina	1923 PG	Lydia Albitskaya, wife of Vladimir Albitsky	· 1028
1059 Mussorgskia	1925 OA	Modest Mussorgsky (1839–1881)	· 1059
1074 Beljawskya	1925 BE	Sergey Belyavsky (1883–1953)	· 1074
1075 Helina	1926 SC	Helij G. Neujmin, son of Grigory Neujmin	· 1075
1094 Siberia	1926 CB	Siberia, Russia	· 1094
1099 Figneria	1928 RQ	Vera Figner (1852–1942)	· 1099
1113 Katja	1928 QC	Katja, a Russian feminine name	· 1113
1118 Hanskya	1927 QD	Alexis Hansky (1872–1908)	· 1118
1121 Natascha	1928 RZ	Natasha "Natalia" Tichomirova, Russian hydro-geologist and daughter of Grigory Neujmin	· 1121
1129 Neujmina	1929 PH	Grigory Neujmin (1885–1946)	· 1129
1147 Stavropolis	1929 LF	Stavropol, Russia	· 1147
1149 Volga	1929 PF	Volga River, Russia	· 1149
1158 Luda	1929 QF	Luda, shortened version of Ludmilla	· 1158
1167 Dubiago	1930 PB	Alexander Dubyago (1903–1959)	· 1167
1189 Terentia	1930 SG	Lidiya I. Terenteva (1879–1933)	· 1189
1190 Pelagia	1930 SL	Pelageya Shajn (1894–1956)	· 1190
1204 Renzia	1931 TE	Franz Robert Renz (1860–1942)	· 1204
1206 Numerowia	1931 UH	Boris Numerov (1891–1941)	· 1206
1210 Morosovia	1931 LB	Nikolai A. Morozov (1854–1946)	· 1210
1255 Schilowa	1932 NC	Mariya V. Zhilova (1870–1934)	· 1255
1306 Scythia	1930 OB	Scythia, an ancient region within present-day Russia and Ukraine	· 1306
1316 Kasan	1933 WC	Kazan, Russia	· 1316
1330 Spiridonia	1925 DB	Spiridon Zaslavsky (1883–1942)	· 1330
1369 Ostanina	1935 QB	Ostanin, Russia	· 1369
1379 Lomonosowa	1936 FC	Mikhail Lomonosov (1711–1765)	· 1379
1380 Volodia	1936 FM	Vladimir Vesselovsky	· 1380
1459 Magnya	1937 VA	Magnya, Russian word meaning "clear, bright and wonderful"	· 1459
1479 Inkeri	1938 DE	Ingria, Russia	· 1479
1480 Aunus	1938 DK	Olonets, Russia	· 1480
1590 Tsiolkovskaja	1933 NA	Konstantin Tsiolkovsky (1857–1935)	· 1590
1603 Neva	1926 VH	Neva River, Russia	· 1603
1606 Jekhovsky	1950 RH	Benjamin Jekhowsky (1881–1975)	· 1606
1610 Mirnaya	1928 RT	Mirnaya, Russian word meaning "peaceful"	· 1610
1621 Druzhba	1926 TM	Druzhba, Russian word meaning "friendship"	· 1621
1648 Shajna	1935 RF	Grigory Shajn (1892–1956)	· 1648
1653 Yakhontovia	1937 RA	N. S. Yakhontova	· 1653
1654 Bojeva	1931 TL	Nina F. Bojeva (1890–1956)	· 1654
1671 Chaika	1934 TD	Valentina Tereshkova	· 1671
1772 Gagarin	1968 CB	Yuri Gagarin (1934–1968)	· 1772
1836 Komarov	1971 OT	Vladimir Komarov (1927–1967)	· 1836
1855 Korolev	1969 TU_{1}	Sergei Korolev (1907–1966)	· 1855
1979 Sakharov	2006 P-L	Andrei Sakharov (1921–1989)	· 1979
2227 Otto Struve	1955 RX	Otto Struve (1897–1963)	· 2227
2233 Kuznetsov	1972 XE_{1}	Nikolai Kuznetsov (1911–1944)	· 2233
2266 Tchaikovsky	1974 VK	Pyotr I. Tchaikovsky (1840–1893)	· 2266
2325 Chernykh	1979 SP	Lyudmila (1935–2017) and Nikolai Chernykh (1931–2004)	· 2325
2700 Baikonur	1976 YP_{7}	Baikonur Cosmodrome, Kazakhstan	· 2700
2776 Baikal	1976 SZ_{7}	Lake Baikal, Russia	· 2776
3010 Ushakov	1978 SB_{5}	Fyodor Ushakov (1745–1817)	· 3010
3013 Dobrovoleva	1979 SD_{7}	Oleg Dobrovolsky (1914–1989)	· 3013
3036 Krat	1937 TO	Vladimir Krat (1911–1983)	· 3036
3038 Bernes	1978 QB_{3}	Mark Bernes (1911–1969)	· 3038
3039 Yangel	1978 SP_{2}	Mikhail Yangel (1911–1971)	· 3039
3044 Saltykov	1983 RE_{3}	Nikita Saltykov (1893–1946)	· 3044
3049 Kuzbass	1968 FH	Kuznets Basin, Siberia, Russia	· 3049
3052 Herzen	1976 YJ_{3}	Alexander Herzen (1812–1870)	· 3052
3054 Strugatskia	1977 RE_{7}	Arkady (1925–1991) and Boris Strugatsky (1933–2012)	· 3054
3055 Annapavlova	1978 TR_{3}	Anna Pavlova (1881–1931)	· 3055
3067 Akhmatova	1982 TE_{2}	Anna Akhmatova (1889–1966)	· 3067
3068 Khanina	1982 YJ_{1}	Frida Khanina	· 3068
3071 Nesterov	1973 FT_{1}	Pyotr Nesterov (1887–1914)	· 3071
3073 Kursk	1979 SW_{11}	Kursk, Russia	· 3073
3074 Popov	1979 YE_{9}	Alexander S. Popov (1859–1906)	· 3074
3080 Moisseiev	1935 TE	Nikolay Moiseyev (1902–1955)	· 3080
3082 Dzhalil	1972 KE	Musa Cälil (1906–1944)	· 3082
3084 Kondratyuk	1977 QB_{1}	Yuri Kondratyuk (1897–1942)	· 3084
3093 Bergholz	1971 MG	Olga Bergholz (1910–1975)	· 3093
3094 Chukokkala	1979 FE_{2}	Korney Chukovsky (1882–1969)	· 3094
3100 Zimmerman	1977 EQ_{1}	Nikolaj V. Zimmerman (1890–1942)	· 3100
3170 Dzhanibekov	1979 SS_{11}	Vladimir Dzhanibekov	· 3170
3942 Churivannia	1977 RH_{7}	Ivan I. Churyumov (1929–1988)	· 3942
3946 Shor	1983 EL_{2}	Viktor A. Shor (1929–2021)	· 3946
5154 Leonov	1969 TL_{1}	Yevgeny Leonov (1926–1994)	· 5154
6180 Bystritskaya	1986 BX_{4}	Ehlina A. Bystritskaya (1928–2019)	· 6180
6278 Ametkhan	1971 TF	Amet-khan Sultan (1920–1971)	· 6278
6355 Univermoscow	1969 TX_{5}	Lomonosov Moscow State University	· 6355
6356 Tairov	1976 QR	Vasiliy E. Tairov (1859–1938)	· 6356
6357 Glushko	1976 SK_{3}	Valentin Glushko (1908–1989)	· 6357
6358 Chertok	1977 AL_{1}	Boris Chertok (1912–2011)	· 6358
6359 Dubinin	1977 AZ_{1}	Yuri Dubinin (1930–2013)	· 6359
6719 Gallaj	1990 UL_{11}	Mark L. Gallaj (1914–1998)	· 6719
6763 Kochiny	1981 RA_{2}	Pelageya (1899–1999) and Nikolai Kochin (1901–1944)	· 6763
6764 Kirillavrov	1981 TM_{3}	Kirill Lavrov (1925–2007)	· 6764
6821 Ranevskaya	1986 SZ_{1}	Faina Ranevskaya (1896–1984)	· 6821
6890 Savinykh	1975 RP	Viktor Savinykh	· 6890
7469 Krikalev	1990 VU_{14}	Sergei Krikalev	· 7469
9533 Aleksejleonov	1981 SA_{7}	Alexei Leonov (1934–2019)	· 9533
11010 Artemieva	1981 ET_{24}	Natalia Artemieva	· 11010
11011 KIAM	1981 UK_{11}	Keldysh Institute of Applied Mathematics (KIAM)	· 11011
11015 Romanenko	1982 SJ_{7}	Boris I. Romanenko (1912–)	· 11015
11016 Borisov	1982 SG_{12}	Vladimir A. Borisov (1809–1862)	· 11016
11026 Greatbotkin	1986 RE_{1}	Botkin Hospital, Moscow	· 11026
11027 Astafʹev	1986 RX_{5}	Victor P. Astafʹev (1924–2001)	· 11027
14519 Ural	1996 TT_{38}	Ural River, Russia/Kazakhstan	· 14519
365756 ISON	2010 WZ_{71}	International Scientific Optical Network (ISON)	· 365756

=== Features on asteroids ===
Mathilde

- Kuznetsk crater - after a Russian coal basin

== Comets ==
As of August 2025, there are 33 known comets discovered by Russian astronomers

Comet designation	Namesake(s)	Discovery (year)	Ref
25D/Neujmin 2	Grigory Neujmin (1885–1946)	1916	
28P/Neujmin 1	Grigory Neujmin (1885–1946)	1913	
42P/Neujmin 3	Grigory Neujmin (1885–1946)	1929	
57P/du Toit-Neujmin-Delporte	Daniel du Toit (1917–1981); Grigory Neujmin; Eugène J. Delporte (1882–1955)	1941	
58P/Jackson-Neujmin	Cyril Jackson (1903–1988) and Grigory Neujmin	1936	
61P/Shajn-Schaldach	Pelageya Shajn (1894–1956) and Robert Schaldach	1949	
74P/Smirnova-Chernykh	Tamara Smirnova (1935–2001) and Nikolai Chernykh (1931–2004)	1975	
101P/Chernykh	Nikolai Chernykh (1931–2004)	1977	
408P/Novichonok-Gerke	Artyom Novichonok and Vladimir Gerke	2011	
479P/Elenin	Leonid Elenin	2011	
C/1914 M1 (Neujmin)	Grigory Neujmin (1885–1946)	1914	
C/1921 H1 (Dubiago)	Alexander Dubyago (1903–1959)	1921	
C/2010 X1 (Elenin)	Leonid Elenin	2010	
C/2012 S1 (ISON)	International Scientific Optical Network (ISON)	2012	
C/2013 N4 (Borisov)	Gennadiy Borisov	2013	
C/2013 V2 (Borisov)	Gennadiy Borisov	2013	
C/2014 Q3 (Borisov)	Gennadiy Borisov	2014	
C/2014 Q3 (Borisov)	Gennadiy Borisov	2014	
C/2014 R1 (Borisov)	Gennadiy Borisov	2014	
C/2015 D4 (Borisov)	Gennadiy Borisov	2015	
C/2015 X4 (Elenin)	Leonid Elenin	2010	
C/2016 R3 (Borisov)	Gennadiy Borisov	2016	
C/2017 A3 (Elenin)	Leonid Elenin	2010	
C/2017 E1 (Borisov)	Gennadiy Borisov	2017	
C/2019 Q4 (Borisov)	Gennadiy Borisov	2019	
C/2019 Q4 (Borisov)	Also known as 2I/Borisov		
C/2019 V1 (Borisov)	Gennadiy Borisov	2019	
C/2020 Q1 (Borisov)	Gennadiy Borisov	2020	
C/2021 L3 (Borisov)	Gennadiy Borisov	2021	
C/2023 T2 (Borisov)	Gennadiy Borisov	2023	
C/2024 V1 (Borisov)	Gennadiy Borisov	2024	
C/2025 B2 (Borisov)	Gennadiy Borisov	2025	
C/2025 J1 (Borisov)	Gennadiy Borisov	2025	
P/2014 X1 (Elenin)	Leonid Elenin	2014	
P/2015 PD_{229} (Cameron–ISON)	Dave Cameron and the International Scientific Optical Network (ISON)	2015	

== Moons ==
=== The Moon ===
Feature	Type	Coordinates	Named after	Ref
Andronov	Crater	22.68°S 146.11°E	Aleksandr Andronov (1901–1952)	
Andrusov	Dorsa	1.56°S 56.77°E	Nicolai I. Andrusov (1861–1924)	
Artamonov	Catena	26.09°N 105.77°E	Nikolay Artamonov (1906–1965)	
Artamonov	Crater	25.44°N 103.79°E	Nikolay Artamonov (1906–1965)	
Beketov	Crater	16.23°N 29.18°E	Nikolay Beketov (1827–1911)	
Belopol'skiy	Crater	17.25°S 128.23°W	Aristarkh Belopolsky (1854–1934)	
Belyaev	Crater	23.10°N 143.11°E	Pavel Belyayev (1925–1970)	
Boris	Crater	30.53°N 33.50°W	Boris, a Russian masculine name	
Boris	Rupes	30.67°N 33.60°W	Boris, a Russian masculine name	
Butlerov	Crater	12.05°N 108.81°W	Aleksandr Butlerov (1828–1886)	
Evdokimov	Crater	34.57°N 153.04°W	Nikolaj N. Evdokimov (1868–1940)	
Fedorov	Crater	28.23°N 37.05°W	Aleksandr P. Fedorov (1872–1910)	
Feoktistov	Crater	30.73°N 140.50°E	Konstantin Feoktistov (1926–2009)	
Fesenkov	Crater	23.16°S 135.14°E	Vasily Fesenkov (1889–1972)	
Firsov	Crater	4.20°N 112.70°E	Georgij F. Firsov (1917–1960)	
Gagarin	Crater	19.66°S 149.35°E	Yuri Gagarin (1934–1968)	
Gavrilov	Crater	17.41°N 131.22°E	Aleksandr (1884–1955) and Igor Gavrilov (1928–1982)	
Kleymenov	Crater	32.48°S 140.36°W	Ivan Kleymyonov (1899–1938)	
Komarov	Crater	24.59°N 152.25°E	Vladimir Komarov (1927–1967)	
Konstantinov	Crater	19.56°N 158.34°E	Konstantin Konstantinov (1818–1871)	
Kramarov	Crater	2.29°S 98.89°W	Grigory Kramarov (1887–1970)	
Krasnov	Crater	29.93°S 79.82°W	Aleksandr V. Krasnov (1866–1911)	
Krylov	Crater	35.26°N 166.11°W	Aleksey Krylov (1863–1945)	
Kurchatov	Crater	38.30°N 141.74°E	Igor Kurchatov (1903–1960)	
Leonov	Crater	19.07°N 148.36°E	Alexei Leonov (1934–2019)	
Lomonosov	Crater	27.35°N 98.28°E	Mikhail Lomonosov (1711–1765)	
Lyapunov	Crater	26.43°N 89.36°E	Aleksandr Lyapunov (1857–1918)	
Maksutov	Crater	40.75°S 168.65°W	Dmitri D. Maksutov (1896–1964)	
Markov	Crater	53.43°N 62.84°W	Aleksandr (1897–1968) and Andrey Markov (1856–1922)	
Mechnikov	Crater	10.47°S 148.99°W	Ilya Mechnikov (1845–1916)	
Moscoviense	Mare	27.28°N 148.12°E	Moscow, Russia	
Morozov	Crater	4.62°N 127.33°E	Nikolai Morozov (1854–1946)	
Numerov	Crater	70.52°S 162.20°W	Boris Numerov (1891–1941)	
Orlov	Crater	25.77°S 175.08°W	Sergei Orlov (1880–1958)	
Pavlov	Crater	28.28°S 142.40°E	Ivan P. Pavlov (1849–1936)	
Petrov	Crater	61.36°S 88.18°E	Yevgeny Petrov	
Polzunov	Crater	25.57°N 115.01°E	Ivan Polzunov (1728–1766)	
Popov	Crater	16.93°N 99.38°E	Aleksandr Popov (1859–1906)	
Razumov	Crater	38.95°N 114.63°W	Vladimir V. Razumov (1890–1967)	
Sechenov	Crater	6.97°S 143.09°W	Ivan Sechenov (1829–1905)	
Sharonov	Crater	12.37°N 173.10°E	Vsevolod Sharonov (1901–1964)	
Shatalov	Crater	24.26°N 140.48°E	Vladimir Shatalov (1927–2021)	
Smirnov	Dorsa	26.41°N 25.53°E	Sergei S. Smirnov (1895–1947)	
Steklov	Crater	36.73°S 105.05°W	Vladimir A. Steklov (1864–1926)	
Stoletov	Crater	44.82°N 155.5°W	Aleksandr Stoletov (1839–1896)	
Tetyaev	Dorsa	20.02°N 64.06°E	Mikhail Tetyaev (1882–1956)	
Tikhomirov	Crater	24.2°N 161.33°E	Nikolai Tikhomirov (1859–1930)	
Tikhov	Crater	61.66°N 172.29°E	Gavriil A. Tikhov (1875–1960)	
Titov	Crater	28.55°N 150.29°E	Gherman Titov (1935–2000)	
Tseraskiy	Crater	48.66°S 142.64°E	Vitold Tserasky (1849–1925)	
Tsiolkovskiy	Crater	20.38°S 128.97°E	Konstantin Tsiolkovsky (1857–1935)	
Usov	Mons	11.91°N 63.26°E	Mikhail Usov (1883–1939)	
Vavilov	Crater	0.87°S 138.77°W	Nikolai (1887–1943) and Sergey Vavilov (1891–1951)	
Vernadskiy	Crater	23.11°N 130.43°E	Vladimir Vernadsky (1863–1945)	
Vetchinkin	Crater	23.11°N 131.08°E	Vladimir Vetchinkin (1888–1950)	
Vil'ev	Crater	5.76°S 144.39°E	Mikhail A. Vil'ev (1893–1919)	
Vinogradov	Mons	9.77°N 32.52°W	Alexander P. Vinogradov (1895–1975)	
Volkov	Crater	13.62°S 131.67°E	Vladislav Volkov (1935–1971)	
Voskresenskiy	Crater	27.91°N 88.12°W	Leonid Voskresensky (1913–1965)	
Yablochkov	Crater	60.78°N 127.58°E	Pavel Yablochkov (1847–1894)	
Yakovkin	Crater	54.42°S 78.93°W	Avenir A. Yakovkin (1887–1974)	
Yangel'	Crater	16.96°N 4.69°E	Mikhail Yangel (1911–1971)	
Yuri	Catena	24.41°N 30.38°W	Yuri, a Russian masculine name	
Zasyadko	Crater	3.96°N 94.19°E	Alexander D. Zasyadko (1779–1837)	
Zelinskiy	Crater	28.74°S 166.86°E	Nikolay Zelinsky (1861–1953)	
Zhiritskiy	Crater	24.84°S 120.26°E	Georgy S. Zhiritskiy (1883–1966)	
Zhukovskiy	Crater	7.55°N 167.28°W	Nikolay Y. Zhukovsky (1847–1921)	

=== Io ===
Feature	Type	Coordinates	Named after	Ref
Podja	Patera	18.5°S 304.75°E	Podja, the spirit of fire in Evenki mythology	
Purgine	Patera	2.37°S 297.26°E	Purgine, the god of thunder in Mordvinian mythology	
Tol-Ava	Patera	1.75°N 322.04°E	Tol-Ava, the goddess of fire in Mordvinian mythology	

=== Callisto ===
Feature	Type	Coordinates	Named after	Ref
Numi-Torum	Crater	50.1°S 92.9°E	Num-Torum, the supreme deity in Mansi mythology	

=== Titan ===
Feature	Type	Coordinates	Named after	Ref
Buyan	Insula	82.87°N 335.43°E	Buyan, an island in Russian folklore said to be located somewhere in the Baltic Sea	
Avancha	Sinus	77.3°N 245.1°E	Avacha Bay, Russia	

=== Charon ===
Feature	Type	Coordinates	Named after	Ref
Sadko	Crater	16.1°S 331.2°E	Sadko, a hero in medieval Russian oral epic poems called bylina	

== Planets ==
=== Mercury ===
Feature	Type	Coordinates	Named after	Ref
Aksakov	Crater	34.71°N 78.74°E	Sergey Aksakov (1791–1859)	
Balanchine	Crater	38.47°N 184.48°E	George Balanchine (1904–1983)	
Barma	Crater	40.93°S 163.49°E	Postnik "Barma" Yakovlev (c. 16th century)	
Belinskij	Crater	77.09°S 103.92°E	Vissarion Belinsky (1811–1848)	
Bunin	Crater	84.47°N 141.76°E	Ivan Bunin (1870–1953)	
Chaikovskij	Crater	7.86°N 50.93°E	Pyotr I. Tchaikovsky (1840–1893)	
Chekov	Crater	36.20°S 61.23°E	Anton Chekhov (1860–1904)	
Derzhavin	Crater	45.60°N 36.93°E	Gavrila Derzhavin (1743–1816)	
Dostoevskij	Crater	44.73°S 178.11°E	Fyodor Dostoevsky (1821–1881)	
Erté	Crater	27.44°N 117.33°E	Romain "Erté" de Tirtoff (1892–1890)	
Fet	Crater	4.72°S 180.22°E	Afanasy Fet (1820–1892)	
Glinka	Crater	14.83°N 112.55°E	Mikhail Glinka (1804–1857)	
Gogol	Crater	28.26°S 147.46°E	Nikolai Gogol (1809–1852)	
Kandinsky	Crater	87.89°N 281.22°E	Wassily Kandinsky (1866–1944)	
Lermontov	Crater	15.24°N 48.94°E	Mikhail Lermontov (1814–1841)	
Mussorgskij	Crater	32.82°N 97.65°E	Modest Mussorgsky (1839–1881)	
Nabokov	Crater	14.56°S 304.24°E	Vladimir Nabokov (1899–1977)	
Petipa	Crater	11.54°S 338.95°E	Marius Petipa (1818–1910)	
Popova	Crater	34.72°S 66.73°E	Lyubov Popova (1889–1924)	
Prokofiev	Crater	85.77°N 297.08°E	Sergei Prokofiev (1891–1953)	

- Pushkin crater
- Rachmaninoff (crater)
- Repin crater
- Roerich (crater)
- Rublev crater
- Stravinsky (crater)
- Surikov crater
- Tolstoj (crater)
- Turgenev Crater

=== Venus ===
Feature	Type	Coordinates	Named after	Ref
Akhmatova	Crater	61.30°N 307.90°E	Anna Akhmatova (1889–1966)	
Andreianova	Crater	3.00°S 68.80°E	Elena Andreianova (1819–1857)	
Barsova	Crater	61.30°N 223.00°E	Valeria Barsova (1892–1967)	
Bugoslavskaya	Crater	23.00°S 300.40°E	Yevgenia Bugoslavskaya (1899–1960)	

=== Mars ===
- Alexey Tolstoy crater
- Barabashov (crater)
- Barsukov crater
- Belyov crater
- Fesenkov (Martian crater)
- Kasimov crater
- Kirsanov crater
- Koval'sky (crater)
- Krishtofovich crater
- Lomonosov (Martian crater)
- Martynov (crater)
- Moroz crater
- Okhotsk crater
- Olenek crater
- Olom crater
- Ostrov crater
- Palana crater
- Reutov crater
- Revda crater
- Ruza crater
- Rynok crater
- Sabo crater
- Sangar crater
- Satka crater
- Sevi crater
- Sharonov (Martian crater)
- Sian crater
- Sinda crater
- Sokol crater
- Sulak crater
- Tem' crater
- Tikhonravov (crater)
- Tokko crater
- Tokma crater
- Tolon crater
- Tomari crater
- Trud crater
- Tumul crater
- Tura crater
- Turma crater
- Udzha crater
- Ulu crater
- Ulya crater
- Utan crater
- Volgograd crater
- Vol'sk crater
- Yar crater
- Zilair (crater)
- Žulanka crater

== Dwarf planets ==
=== 1 Ceres ===
Feature	Type	Coordinates	Named after	Ref
Kupalo	Crater	39.44°S 173.20°E	Kupalo, the god of agriculture in Russian/Slavic mythology	
Baltay	Catena	49.34°S 274.49°E	Baltai, an agricultural festival of the Mordvin people	
Gerber	Catena	38.30°S 215.50°E	Gerber, an agricultural festival of the Udmurt people	

=== 134340 Pluto ===
Feature	Type	Coordinates	Named after	Ref
Safronov	Regio	13.36°S 209.49°E	Viktor Safronov (1917–1999)	

== Stars and exoplanets ==
As of March 2024, only HAT-P-3 and its planet (b) have IAU-approved Russian formal names, which they received during the second NameExoWorlds campaign in 2019

Star	Planet	Distance	Named after
Dombay (HAT-P-3)	Teberda (HAT-P-3b)	440 ly	Dombay and Teberda River, Russia

== See also ==
- List of cosmonauts

== Sources ==
- Lists of geological features of the Solar System
- List of craters in the Solar System
- List of people with craters of the Moon named after them
- List of minor planets named after people
- List of astronomical objects named after people
- List of galaxies named after people
- Stars named after people
