= 1084 Tamariwa =

Main-belt asteroid

Discovery
- Discovered by: S. Belyavskyj
- Discovery site: Simeiz Obs.
- Discovery date: 12 February 1926

Designations
- Named after: Tamara Ivanova (Soviet parachutist)
- Alternative designations: 1926 CC · 1927 JB; 1928 TA
- Minor planet category: main-belt · (middle) background

Orbital characteristics
- Epoch 4 September 2017 (JD 2458000.5)
- Uncertainty parameter 0
- Observation arc: 90.51 yr (33,058 days)
- Aphelion: 3.0443 AU
- Perihelion: 2.3327 AU
- Semi-major axis: 2.6885 AU
- Eccentricity: 0.1323
- Orbital period (sidereal): 4.41 yr (1,610 days)
- Mean anomaly: 122.39°
- Mean motion: 0° 13^{m} 24.96^{s} / day
- Inclination: 3.8953°
- Longitude of ascending node: 186.88°
- Argument of perihelion: 109.88°

Physical characteristics
- Dimensions: 24.71±6.42 km 26.476±0.237 km 27.19±1.9 km 28.87±0.44 km 30.681±0.394 km
- Synodic rotation period: 6.153±0.001 h 6.153 h 6.19±0.01 h 6.1949±0.0002 h 6.195±0.001 h 6.1961±0.0002 h 6.22 h 7.08 h
- Geometric albedo: 0.0916±0.0083; 0.103±0.004; 0.1165±0.018; 0.132±0.034; 0.15±0.12
- Spectral type: C B–V = 0.770; U–B = 0.270
- Absolute magnitude (H): 10.78 · 10.84

1084 Tamariwa, provisional designation 1926 CC, is a carbonaceous background asteroid approximately 27 kilometres in diameter from the central regions of the asteroid belt. It was discovered on 12 February 1926, by Soviet astronomer Sergey Belyavsky at the Simeiz Observatory on the Crimean peninsula. The asteroid was named after female paratrooper Tamara Ivanova, who died at an early age.

== Orbit and classification ==
Tamariwa is a non-family asteroid from the main belt's background population. It orbits the Sun in the central asteroid belt at a distance of 2.3–3.0 AU once every 4 years and 5 months (1,610 days; semi-major axis of 2.69 AU). Its orbit has an eccentricity of 0.13 and an inclination of 4° with respect to the ecliptic.

The body's observation arc begins at Simeiz with its identification as 1927 JB in May 1927, more than 14 months after its official discovery observation.

== Physical characteristics ==
Tamariwa is a common carbonaceous C-type asteroid.

=== Rotation period ===
Several rotational lightcurves of Tamariwa with a rotation period between 6.153 and 7.08 hours have been obtained from photometric observations since 1984. Analysis of the best-rated lightcurve by French amateur astronomer Pierre Antonini gave a period of 6.1961 hours with a brightness amplitude of 0.42 magnitude (U=3).

=== Diameter and albedo ===
According to the surveys carried out by the Infrared Astronomical Satellite IRAS, the Japanese Akari satellite and the NEOWISE mission of NASA's Wide-field Infrared Survey Explorer, Tamariwa measures between 24.71 and 30.681 kilometers in diameter and its surface has an albedo between 0.0916 and 0.15.

The Collaborative Asteroid Lightcurve Link adopts the results obtained by IRAS, that is, an albedo of 0.1165 and a diameter of 27.19 kilometers based on an absolute magnitude of 10.78.

== Naming ==
This minor planet was named "Tamariwa" after Soviet parachutist Tamara Ivanova (1912–1936). The minor planets 1062 Ljuba and 1086 Nata were also named after Soviet female paratroopers Lyuba Berlin (1915–1936) and Nata Babushkina (1915–1936), respectively.
