= 850 Altona =

Large background asteroid

Discovery
- Discovered by: S. Belyavskyj
- Discovery site: Simeiz Obs.
- Discovery date: 27 March 1916

Designations
- Pronunciation: /ælˈtoʊnə/
- Named after: German city of Altona
- Alternative designations: A916 FG · A923 RP; 1916 Σ24 · 1923 RP
- Minor planet category: main-belt · (outer) background

Orbital characteristics
- Epoch 31 May 2020 (JD 2459000.5)
- Uncertainty parameter 0
- Observation arc: 102.52 yr (37,446 d)
- Aphelion: 3.3753 AU
- Perihelion: 2.6234 AU
- Semi-major axis: 2.9994 AU
- Eccentricity: 0.1253
- Orbital period (sidereal): 5.19 yr (1,897 d)
- Mean anomaly: 318.70°
- Mean motion: 0° 11^{m} 22.92^{s} / day
- Inclination: 15.546°
- Longitude of ascending node: 121.13°
- Argument of perihelion: 134.95°

Physical characteristics
- Dimensions: 80.0 km × 80.0 km
- Mean diameter: 73.16±0.88 km; 77.097±2.263 km; 80.90±1.8 km
- Synodic rotation period: 11.1913±0.0009 h (Note: Lightcurve plot of (850) Altona by Brian Warner, Palmer Divide Station (U82) at Center for Solar System Studies (2017). Rotation period 11.1913±0.0009 hours with a brightness amplitude of 0.17±0.01 mag. Quality code is 3. Summary figures at the LCDB and CS3.)
- Geometric albedo: 0.0390±0.002; 0.043±0.009; 0.048±0.001
- Spectral type: X (S3OS2)
- Absolute magnitude (H): 9.70

850 Altona (prov. designation: A916 FG or 1916 Σ24) is a large background asteroid, approximately 77 kilometers (48 miles) in diameter, that is located in the outer region of the asteroid belt. It was discovered on 27 March 1916, by Russian astronomer Sergey Belyavsky at the Simeiz Observatory on the Crimean peninsula. The X-type asteroid has a rotation period of 11.2 hours. It was named after the city of Altona near Hamburg, Germany.

== Orbit and classification ==
Altona is a non-family asteroid of the main belt's background population when applying the hierarchical clustering method to its proper orbital elements. It orbits the Sun in the outer asteroid belt at a distance of 2.6–3.4 AU once every 5 years and 2 months (1,897 days; semi-major axis of 3 AU). Its orbit has an eccentricity of 0.13 and an inclination of 16° with respect to the ecliptic. The body's observation arc begins at Algiers Observatory in North Africa on 28 July 1917, more than a year after its official its discovery observation at the Simeiz Observatory on 27 March 1916.

== Naming ==
This minor planet was named after Altona, Hamburg, the location of the Altona Observatory, at which Heinrich Christian Schumacher began publication of the astronomical journal Astronomische Nachrichten in 1821. Altona is the home-town of Friedrich Georg Wilhelm von Struve, who founded the Pulkovo Observatory near St Petersburg, Russia. The naming was also mentioned in The Names of the Minor Planets by Paul Herget in 1955 (H 83).

== Physical characteristics ==
In both the Tholen- and SMASS-like taxonomy of the Small Solar System Objects Spectroscopic Survey (S3OS2), Altona is an X-type asteroid.

=== Rotation period ===
In September 2017, a rotational lightcurve of Altona was obtained from photometric observations by Brian Warner at his Palmer Divide Station (U82) of the Center for Solar System Studies in California. Lightcurve analysis gave a well-defined rotation period of 11.1913±0.0009 hours with a brightness variation of 0.17±0.01 magnitude (U=3).

The result supersedes previous period determinations of: 11.131±0.0066 and 11.16±0.380 hours by astronomers at the Palomar Transient Factory, California, in January 2014 (U=2/2), 11.195±0.001 hours by Michael Alkema at the Elephant Head Observatory (G35) in Arizona in December 2012 (U=2+), 11.197±0.002 hours by Frederick Pilcher at the Organ Mesa Observatory (G50) in June 2010 (U=2), and 11.9±0.5 hours by Robin Esseiva, Nicolas Esseiva and Raoul Behrend in April 2015 (U=2).

=== Diameter and albedo ===
According to the surveys carried out by the Japanese Akari satellite, the NEOWISE mission of NASA's Wide-field Infrared Survey Explorer (WISE), and the Infrared Astronomical Satellite IRAS, Altona measures (73.16±0.88), (77.097±2.263) and (80.90±1.8) kilometers in diameter and its surface has an albedo of (0.048±0.001), (0.043±0.009) and (0.0390±0.002), respectively.

The Collaborative Asteroid Lightcurve Link derives an albedo of 0.0356 and a diameter of 80.85 kilometers based on an absolute magnitude of 9.7. Alternative mean-diameter measurements published by the WISE team include (59.945±0.585 km), (63.25±16.39 km), (69.47±2.17 km) and (81.518±19.16 km) with corresponding albedos of (0.0710±0.0051), (0.06±0.04), (0.053±0.018), and (0.0403±0.0278). An asteroid occultation observed on 3 April 2008, gave a best-fit ellipse dimension of (80.0 km × 80.0 km). These timed observations are taken when the asteroid passes in front of a distant star.
