= 849 Ara =

Asteroid

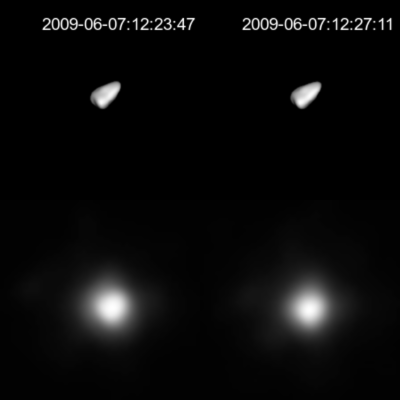
- Lightcurve model of 849 Ara on the top and an image of 849 Ara on the bottom.

Discovery
- Discovered by: S. Belyavskyj
- Discovery site: Simeiz Obs.
- Discovery date: 9 February 1912

Designations
- Pronunciation: /ˈɛərə/
- Named after: American Relief Administration
- Alternative designations: A912 CD · 1935 FU; 1960 WN · A915 UB; 1912 NY · 1915 Σai
- Minor planet category: main-belt · (outer); background

Orbital characteristics
- Epoch 31 May 2020 (JD 2459000.5)
- Uncertainty parameter 0
- Observation arc: 100.58 yr (36,737 d)
- Aphelion: 3.7783 AU
- Perihelion: 2.5141 AU
- Semi-major axis: 3.1462 AU
- Eccentricity: 0.2009
- Orbital period (sidereal): 5.58 yr (2,038 d)
- Mean anomaly: 323.29°
- Mean motion: 0° 10^{m} 35.76^{s} / day
- Inclination: 19.530°
- Longitude of ascending node: 228.37°
- Argument of perihelion: 63.293°
- T_{Jupiter}: 3.0900

Physical characteristics
- Dimensions: 97.5 km × 70.7 km
- Mean diameter: 73±3 km
- Mass: (7.5±7.5)×10^{17} kg (Note: Calculated from its standard gravitational parameter GM = 0.05±0.05 km^{3}/s^{2}.) (SB441)
- Mean density: 3.7±3.7 g/cm^{3} (calculated)
- Synodic rotation period: 4.116391 h
- Pole ecliptic longitude: 223° ± 3°
- Pole ecliptic latitude: −41° ± 3°
- Geometric albedo: 0.126±0.040
- Spectral type: Tholen = M; M (Tholen like); X (Bus–DeMeo like); U–B = 0.252±0.016; B–V = 0.700±0.010; V–R = 0.37±0.03; V–I = 0.79±0.04
- Absolute magnitude (H): 8.2

849 Ara (prov. designation: A912 CD or 1912 NY) is a large, metallic background asteroid, approximately 80 kilometers (50 miles) in diameter, that is located in the outer region of the asteroid belt. It was discovered on 9 February 1912, by Russian astronomer Sergey Belyavsky at the Simeiz Observatory on the Crimean peninsula. The M-type asteroid has a short rotation period of 4.1 hours and is likely elongated in shape. It was named after the American Relief Administration (ARA) for the help given during the Russian famine of 1921–22.

== Orbit and classification ==
Ara is a non-family asteroid of the main belt's background population when applying the hierarchical clustering method to its proper orbital elements. It orbits the Sun in the outer asteroid belt at a distance of 2.5–3.8 AU once every 5 years and 7 months (2,038 days; semi-major axis of 3.15 AU). Its orbit has an eccentricity of 0.20 and an inclination of 20° with respect to the ecliptic. In addition, Ara has a low Jupiter tisserand of 3.09, just above the defined threshold of 3.0 which is used to distinguish asteroids from the Jupiter-family comets. The body's observation arc begins at the Collegio Romano Observatory (531) in Italy on 3 July 1919, more than 6 years after its official discovery observation at Simeiz.

== Naming ==
This minor planet was named after American Relief Administration (ARA), in appreciation of the help it gave during the Russian famine of 1921–22. Headed by Herbert Hoover, ARA was a relief mission after World War I to Europe which also included post-revolutionary Russia later on. The naming was mentioned in The Names of the Minor Planets by Paul Herget in 1955 (H 83).

== Physical characteristics ==
In the Tholen classification as well as in the lesser known taxonomic method by Howell, Ara is a metallic M-type asteroid. This spectral type translates into the X-type in more modern asteroid taxonomic systems. In 2018 and 2019, a study using photometry from the Korea Microlensing Telescope Network and the South African Astronomical Observatory, grouped Ara into the X-type category based on the Bus–DeMeo classification.

=== Rotation period and pole ===
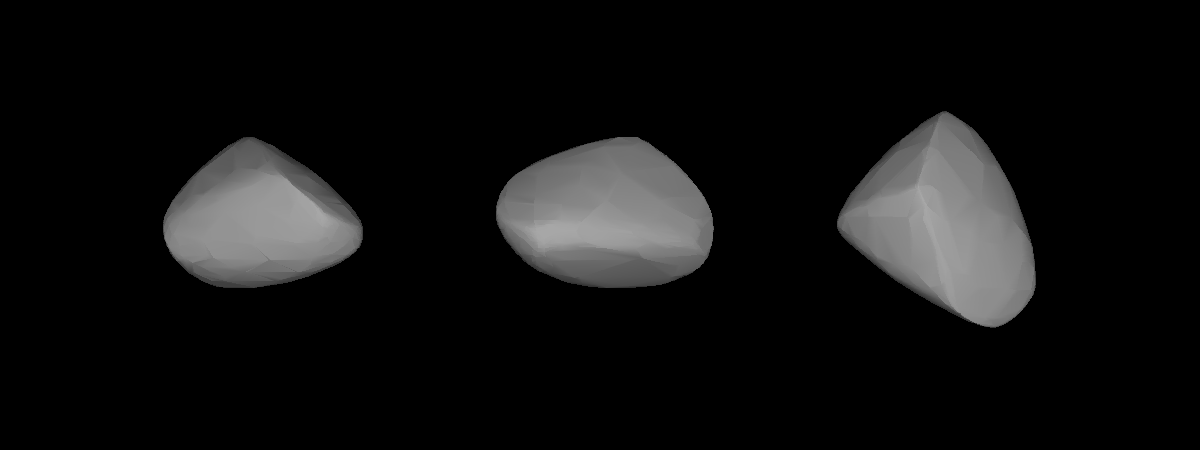
Lightcurve-based 3D-model of Ara

In June 1981, a rotational lightcurve of Ara was obtained from photometric observations by Alan Harris. Lightcurve analysis gave a rotation period of 4.116 hours with a brightness variation of 0.34 magnitude, indicative of an elongated shape (U=3). Numerous observations have since confirmed this period. This includes Laurent Bernasconi 4.1165±0.0007 h (2004) and 4.123±0.007 h (2006), Davide Gandolfi 4.117±0.001 h (2006), Adam Marciniak 4.116±0.001 h (2009), Maurice Audejean 4.1176±0.0007 h (2010), and Richard E. Schmidt 4.1168±0.0025 h (2017). In 2017, a modeled lightcurve gave a concurring sidereal period of 4.116391±0.000002 hours as well as a spin axis of (223°, −41°) in ecliptic coordinates (λ, β).

=== Diameter and albedo ===
According to the surveys carried out by the Japanese Akari satellite, the Infrared Astronomical Satellite IRAS, and the NEOWISE mission of NASA's Wide-field Infrared Survey Explorer (WISE), Ara measures (59.92±1.09), (61.82±3.3) and (80.756±1.127) kilometers in diameter and its surface has an albedo of (0.287±0.013), (0.2660±0.031) and (0.126±0.040), respectively. Alternative mean-diameters published by the WISE team include (74.00±2.89 km) and (84.417±2.447 km) with corresponding albedos of (0.186±0.023) and (0.1155±0.0163).

In 2009 and 2015, several asteroid occultations of Ara were observed. The two best-rated observations from January 2009 and April 2015 and August 2008, gave a best-fit ellipse dimension of (97.5 km × 70.7 km) and (98.0 km × 98.0 km), respectively. These timed observations are taken when the asteroid passes in front of a distant star. The Collaborative Asteroid Lightcurve Link adopts Petr Pravec's revised WISE albedo of 0.1149 and takes a diameter of 84.61 kilometers based on an absolute magnitude of 8.33, while Josef Ďurech calculates a diameter of 76±14 km by combining lightcurve inversion models with asteroid occultation silhouettes.
