= 812 Adele =

Eunomia asteroid

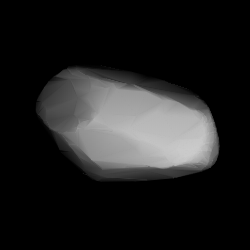
- Modelled shape of Adele from its lightcurve

Discovery
- Discovered by: S. Belyavskyj
- Discovery site: Simeiz Obs.
- Discovery date: 8 September 1915

Designations
- Named after: Adele, character in the operetta Die Fledermaus
- Alternative designations: A915 RU · A902 UE; 1915 XV
- Minor planet category: main-belt · (middle); Eunomia

Orbital characteristics
- Epoch 31 May 2020 (JD 2459000.5)
- Uncertainty parameter 0
- Observation arc: 104.40 yr (38,132 d)
- Aphelion: 3.0981 AU
- Perihelion: 2.2220 AU
- Semi-major axis: 2.6601 AU
- Eccentricity: 0.1647
- Orbital period (sidereal): 4.34 yr (1,585 d)
- Mean anomaly: 46.769°
- Mean motion: 0° 13^{m} 37.92^{s} / day
- Inclination: 13.298°
- Longitude of ascending node: 7.2582°
- Argument of perihelion: 353.10°

Physical characteristics
- Mean diameter: 12.356±0.111 km; 13.57±0.43 km
- Synodic rotation period: 5.8587±0.0002 h
- Pole ecliptic latitude: (301.0°, 44.0°) (λ_{1}/β_{1}); (154.0°, 69.0°) (λ_{2}/β_{2})
- Geometric albedo: 0.257±0.019; 0.291±0.041
- Spectral type: S (family-based)
- Absolute magnitude (H): 11.50; 11.8

812 Adele (prov. designation: A915 RU or 1915 XV) is an elongated Eunomia asteroid from the central regions of the asteroid belt. It was discovered on 8 September 1915, by Russian astronomer Sergey Belyavsky at the Simeiz Observatory on the Crimean peninsula. The presumed S-type asteroid has a rotation period of 5.9 hours and measures approximately 13 kilometers (8 miles) in diameter. It was likely named after the character "Adele" in the opera Die Fledermaus by Johann Strauss.

== Orbit and classification ==
When applying the hierarchical clustering method to its proper orbital elements, Adele is a core member of the Eunomia family (502), a prominent family of stony S-type asteroids and the largest one in the intermediate main belt with more than 5,000 known members. It orbits the Sun in the central asteroid belt at a distance of 2.2–3.1 AU once every 4 years and 4 months (1,585 days; semi-major axis of 2.66 AU). Its orbit has an eccentricity of 0.16 and an inclination of 13° with respect to the ecliptic.

== Discovery ==
Adele was discovered by Russian astronomer Sergey Belyavsky at the Simeiz Observatory on the Crimean peninsula 8 September 1915. Three nights later, on 11 September 1915, it was independently discovered by Max Wolf the Heidelberg Observatory in Germany. The Minor Planet Center however, only credits the first discoverer. The asteroid was first observed as A902 UE at Heidelberg on 25 October 1902. The body's observation arc begins at the Bergedorf Observatory on 19 September 1915, less than two weeks after its official discovery observation.

== Naming ==
This minor planet was likely named after "Adele", Rosalinde's maid, a character in the operetta Die Fledermaus by Johann Strauss (1825–1899). The name was given by the independent discoverer Max Wolf. The author of the Dictionary of Minor Planet Names, Lutz Schmadel, learned about the meaning of the asteroid's name from R. Bremer and Ingrid van Houten-Groeneveld, latter who worked as a young astronomer at Heidelberg.

== Physical characteristics ==
Based on the overall spectral type of the Eunomia family, Adele is likely a common, stony S-type asteroid.

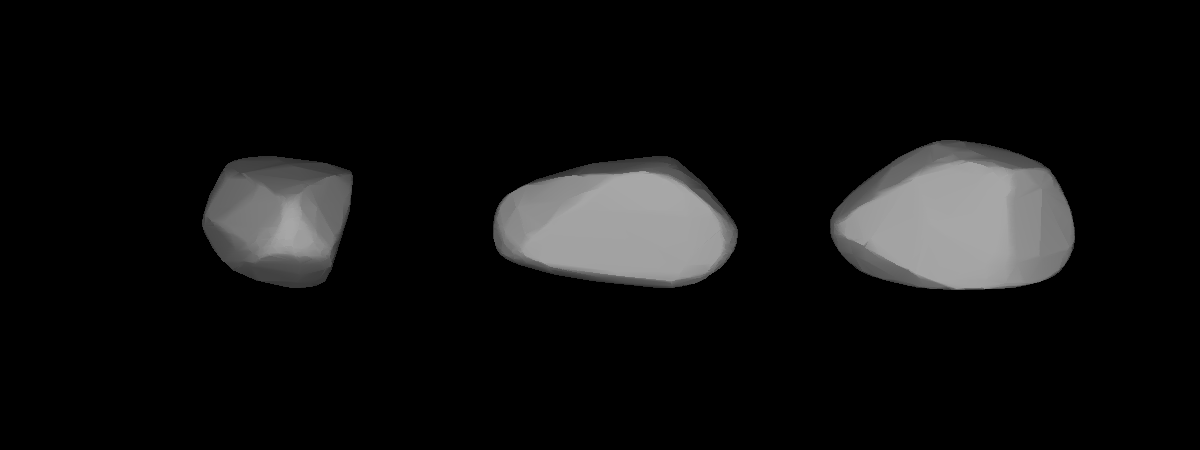
Lightcurve-based 3D-model of Adele

=== Rotation period ===
In October 2002, a rotational lightcurve of Adele was obtained from photometric observations by French amateur astronomer René Roy. Lightcurve analysis gave a well-defined rotation period of 5.8587±0.0002 hours with a high brightness variation of 0.69±0.02 magnitude, indicative of an elongated shape (U=3).

In 2016, a modeled lightcurve gave a concurring sidereal period of 5.85746±0.00002 hours using data from the Uppsala Asteroid Photometric Catalogue, the Palomar Transient Factory survey, and individual observers (such as above), as well as sparse-in-time photometry from the NOFS, the Catalina Sky Survey, and the La Palma surveys (950). The study also determined two spin axes at (301.0°, 44.0°) and (154.0°, 69.0°) in ecliptic coordinates (λ, β).

=== Diameter and albedo ===
According to the surveys carried out by the NEOWISE mission of NASA's Wide-field Infrared Survey Explorer (WISE) and the Japanese Akari satellite, Adele measures (12.356±0.111) and (13.57±0.43) kilometers in diameter and its surface has an albedo of (0.291±0.041) and (0.257±0.019), respectively. The Collaborative Asteroid Lightcurve Link assumes a standard albedo for a Eunomian asteroid of 0.21 and calculates a diameter of 12.66 kilometers based on an absolute magnitude of 11.8. Alternative mean-diameter measurements published by the WISE team include (11.93±0.33 km) and (13.619±0.263 km) with corresponding albedos of (0.259±0.047) and (0.2420±0.0275).
