= 855 Newcombia =

Stony background asteroid

Discovery
- Discovered by: S. Belyavskyj
- Discovery site: Simeiz Obs.
- Discovery date: 3 April 1916

Designations
- Named after: Simon Newcomb (United States Naval Observatory)
- Alternative designations: A916 GP · 1935 SJ_{1} 1938 KB · 1916 ZP
- Minor planet category: main-belt · (inner) background

Orbital characteristics
- Epoch 31 May 2020 (JD 2459000.5)
- Uncertainty parameter 0
- Observation arc: 103.77 yr (37,902 d)
- Aphelion: 2.7845 AU
- Perihelion: 1.9403 AU
- Semi-major axis: 2.3624 AU
- Eccentricity: 0.1787
- Orbital period (sidereal): 3.63 yr (1,326 d)
- Mean anomaly: 211.62°
- Mean motion: 0° 16^{m} 17.04^{s} / day
- Inclination: 10.881°
- Longitude of ascending node: 17.118°
- Argument of perihelion: 233.98°

Physical characteristics
- Mean diameter: 10.97±0.28 km; 12.392±0.088 km
- Synodic rotation period: 3.003 h
- Geometric albedo: 0.219±0.040; 0.285±0.017
- Spectral type: S (SDSS-MOC)
- Absolute magnitude (H): 11.70

855 Newcombia (prov. designation: A916 GP or 1916 ZP) is a stony background asteroid from the inner regions of the asteroid belt. It was discovered on 3 April 1916, by astronomer Sergey Belyavsky at the Simeiz Observatory on the Crimean peninsula. The S-type asteroid has a notably short rotation period of 3.0 hours and measures approximately 12 kilometers (7.5 miles) in diameter. It was named after Canadian–American astronomer Simon Newcomb (1835–1909).

== Orbit and classification ==
Newcombia is a non-family asteroid of the main belt's background population when applying the hierarchical clustering method to its proper orbital elements. It orbits the Sun in the inner main-belt at a distance of 1.9–2.8 AU once every 3 years and 8 months (1,326 days; semi-major axis of 2.36 AU). Its orbit has an eccentricity of 0.18 and an inclination of 11° with respect to the ecliptic.

== Discovery ==
Newcombia was discovered by Soviet-Russian astronomer Sergey Belyavsky at the Simeiz Observatory on the Crimean peninsula on 3 April 1916. The body's observation arc begins three weeks later, with its independent discovery by Max Wolf at Heidelberg Observatory on 28 April 2016. The Minor Planet Center, however, only credits the first discoverer.

== Naming ==
This minor planet was named after Simon Newcomb (1835–1909), a Canadian–American professor of astronomy and director of the U.S. Nautical Almanac Office at the United States Naval Observatory. He worked on cometary and planetary orbits and is known for his Tables of the Motion of the Earth on its Axis and Around the Sun, a mathematical development of the position of the Earth in the Solar System. Newcomb also measured the speed of light and revised the astronomical unit. The naming was mentioned in The Names of the Minor Planets by Paul Herget in 1955 (H 84). The lunar crater Newcomb as well as the Martian crater Newcomb were also named in his honor.

== Physical characteristics ==
In the SDSS-based taxonomy, Newcombia is a common, stony S-type asteroid.

=== Rotation period ===
In October 2004, a rotational lightcurve of Newcombia was obtained from photometric observations by American amateur astronomer Walter R. Cooney Jr. in collaboration with John Gross, Dirk Terrell, Vishnu Reddy and Ron Dyvig. Lightcurve analysis gave a well-defined rotation period of 3.003±0.007 hours with a brightness variation of 0.35±0.03 magnitude (U=3).

An identical period of 3.003±0.001 hours with an amplitude of 0.33±0.02 magnitude was determined in April 2014, by Daniel Klinglesmith and colleagues at the Etscorn Observatory (719) in New Mexico (U=3). Klinglesmith also published a period of 3.004±0.001 h in November 2015 and January 2017 (U=3/3). Two more lightcurves by Robert Stephens at the Center for Solar System Studies (U81) gave a period of 3.002±0.001 and 3.004±0.001 hours with a brightness variation of 0.41±0.02 and 0.4±0.02 magnitude in March 2014 and September 2019, respectively (U=3/3). (Note: Lightcurve plots of (855) Newcombia from March 2014 (3.002±0.001 h) and from September 2019 (3.004±0.001 h) taken at the Center for Solar System Studies (CS3). Quality code of 3. Summary figures at the LCDB and CS3.)

=== Diameter and albedo ===
According to the surveys carried out by the Japanese Akari satellite and the NEOWISE mission of NASA's Wide-field Infrared Survey Explorer (WISE), Newcombia measures (10.97±0.28) and (12.392±0.088) kilometers in diameter and its surface has an albedo of (0.285±0.017) and (0.219±0.040), respectively. The Collaborative Asteroid Lightcurve Link assumes a standard albedo for a stony asteroid of 0.20 and calculates a diameter of 13.58 kilometers based on an absolute magnitude of 11.7. Alternative mean-diameter measurements published by the WISE team include (10.19±1.49 km) and (12.930±0.133 km) with corresponding albedos of (0.41±0.19) and (0.2037±0.0483).
