= 1074 Beljawskya =

Themistian asteroid

Discovery
- Discovered by: S. Belyavskyj
- Discovery site: Simeiz Obs.
- Discovery date: 26 January 1925

Designations
- Named after: Sergey Belyavsky (discoverer himself)
- Alternative designations: 1925 BE · 1949 KC_{1} A912 VN · A914 BB; A917 QB · A923 TA
- Minor planet category: main-belt · Themis

Orbital characteristics
- Epoch 16 February 2017 (JD 2457800.5)
- Uncertainty parameter 0
- Observation arc: 91.32 yr (33,353 days)
- Aphelion: 3.7138 AU
- Perihelion: 2.5863 AU
- Semi-major axis: 3.1501 AU
- Eccentricity: 0.1790
- Orbital period (sidereal): 5.59 yr (2,042 days)
- Mean anomaly: 196.05°
- Mean motion: 0° 10^{m} 34.68^{s} / day
- Inclination: 0.8006°
- Longitude of ascending node: 38.132°
- Argument of perihelion: 22.886°

Physical characteristics
- Dimensions: 39.91±11.13 km 47.70 km (derived); 47.82±2.2 km (IRAS:11); 49.189±0.666 km 52.28±0.96 km 54.368±0.813 km
- Synodic rotation period: 6.284±0.002 h 6.285±0.0035 h
- Geometric albedo: 0.0598±0.0111; 0.0646 (derived); 0.066±0.003; 0.073±0.008; 0.0772±0.007 (IRAS:11); 0.08±0.03
- Spectral type: S (assumed)
- Absolute magnitude (H): 10.0 · 10.046±0.004 (R) · 10.10 · 10.2 · 10.21±0.15

1074 Beljawskya, provisional designation 1925 BE, is a Themistian asteroid from the outer region of the asteroid belt, approximately 48 kilometers in diameter.

It was discovered on 26 January 1925, by Soviet–Russian astronomer Sergey Belyavsky at Simeiz Observatory on the Crimean peninsula. It was named in honor of its discoverer.

== Orbit and classification ==
Beljawskya is a member of the Themis family, a dynamical family of outer-belt asteroids with nearly coplanar ecliptical orbits. It orbits the Sun at a distance of 2.6–3.7 AU once every 5 years and 7 months (2,042 days). Its orbit has an eccentricity of 0.18 and an inclination of 1° with respect to the ecliptic.

It was first identified as A912 VN at Winchester Observatory (799) in 1912. The body's observation arc begins with its identification as A923 TA at Simeiz in 1923, almost two years prior to its official discovery observation.

== Physical characteristics ==
=== Photometry ===
In October 2007, a rotational lightcurve of Beljawskya was obtained by French amateur astronomer Pierre Antonini. It gave a well-defined rotation period of 6.284 hours with a brightness variation of 0.37 magnitude (U=3). Photometric observations in the R-band at the U.S. Palomar Transient Factory in September 2013, gave a concurring period of 6.285 hours with an amplitude of 0.32 magnitude (U=2).

=== Diameter and albedo ===
According to the surveys carried out by the Infrared Astronomical Satellite IRAS, the Japanese Akari satellite, and NASA's Wide-field Infrared Survey Explorer with its subsequent NEOWISE mission, Beljawskya measures between 39.91 and 52.28 kilometers in diameter, and its surface has an albedo of 0.066 and 0.08 (without preliminary results).

The Collaborative Asteroid Lightcurve Link derives an albedo of 0.0646 and a diameter of 47.70 kilometers using an absolute magnitude of 10.2. CALL also classifies the dark Themistian asteroid as a S-type rather than a C-type body.

== Naming ==
Proposed by staff members of the discovering Simeis Observatory, this minor planet was named in honor of its discoverer Sergey Ivanovich Belyavsky (1883–1953). He also discovered the hyperbolic comet C/1911 S3 that was visible to the naked eye. Between 1912 and 1927, he has discovered 36 numbered minor planets. Naming citation was first mentioned in The Names of the Minor Planets by Paul Herget in 1955 (H 102).
