= 1911 (disambiguation) =

1911 is a year in the Gregorian calendar.

1911 may also refer to:

== Aircraft ==
- Bristol 1911 Monoplane
- Epps 1911 Monoplane

== Comets ==
- 1911 IV (C/1911 S3), discovered by Sergei Ivanovich Beljawsky
- 1911 V (C/1911 O1), discovered by William Robert Brooks

== Firearms ==
- M1911, a semi-automatic pistol
- Remington 1911 R1, modeled after the M1911
- Ruger SR1911, modeled after the M1911
- Winchester Model 1911, a semi-automatic shotgun

== Mass media ==
- 1911 (film)
- 1911 Encyclopædia Britannica
