= 1153 Wallenbergia =

Main-belt asteroid

Discovery
- Discovered by: S. Belyavskyj
- Discovery site: Simeiz Obs.
- Discovery date: 5 September 1924

Designations
- Named after: Georg Wallenberg (Note: Wallenberg's middle name is likely "Jakob", not "James" as given in the Dictionary of Minor Planet Names) (German mathematician)
- Alternative designations: 1924 SL · 1930 HH
- Minor planet category: main-belt · (inner) · Flora

Orbital characteristics
- Epoch 4 September 2017 (JD 2458000.5)
- Uncertainty parameter 0
- Observation arc: 87.02 yr (31,784 days)
- Aphelion: 2.5489 AU
- Perihelion: 1.8428 AU
- Semi-major axis: 2.1958 AU
- Eccentricity: 0.1608
- Orbital period (sidereal): 3.25 yr (1,189 days)
- Mean anomaly: 237.52°
- Mean motion: 0° 18^{m} 10.44^{s} / day
- Inclination: 3.3345°
- Longitude of ascending node: 280.54°
- Argument of perihelion: 28.766°

Physical characteristics
- Dimensions: 8.02±1.81 km 8.037±0.357 km 9.36 km (derived)
- Synodic rotation period: 4.096±0.002 h 4.116±0.0055 h 4.12±0.070 h
- Geometric albedo: 0.24 (assumed); 0.37±0.14; 0.433±0.091
- Spectral type: S
- Absolute magnitude (H): 11.985±0.002 (R) · 12.00 · 12.040±0.100 (R) · 12.1 · 12.28 · 12.31±0.08 · 12.49±0.22

1153 Wallenbergia, provisional designation 1924 SL, is a stony Florian asteroid from the inner regions of the asteroid belt, approximately 8 kilometers in diameter. It was discovered on 5 September 1924, by Soviet astronomer Sergey Belyavsky at the Simeiz Observatory on the Crimean peninsula. The asteroid was named after German mathematician Georg Wallenberg.

== Orbit and classification ==
Wallenbergia is a member of the Flora family (402), a giant asteroid family and the largest family of stony asteroids in the main-belt. It orbits the Sun in the inner main-belt at a distance of 1.8–2.5 AU once every 3 years and 3 months (1,189 days). Its orbit has an eccentricity of 0.16 and an inclination of 3° with respect to the ecliptic.

The body's observation arc begins with its identification as 1930 HH at Johannesburg Observatory in April 1930, almost six years after its official discovery observation at Simeiz.

== Physical characteristics ==
Wallenbergia has been characterized as a stony S-type asteroid by PanSTARRS photometric survey.

=== Rotation period ===
In September 1989, the first rotational lightcurve of Wallenbergia was obtained from photometric observations by Polish astronomer Wiesław Z. Wiśniewski at University of Arizona. Lightcurve analysis gave a well-defined rotation period of 4.096 hours with a brightness amplitude of 0.33 magnitude (U=3). Observations in the R-band at the Palomar Transient Factory in 2014, gave a period of 4.116 and 4.12 hours with an amplitude of 0.25 and 0.23 magnitude, respectively (U=2/2).

=== Diameter and albedo ===
According to the survey carried out by the NEOWISE mission of NASA's Wide-field Infrared Survey Explorer, Wallenbergia measures 8.02 and 8.037 kilometers in diameter and its surface has an albedo of 0.37 and 0.433, respectively.

The Collaborative Asteroid Lightcurve Link assumes an albedo of 0.24 – taken from 8 Flora, the parent body of the Flora family – and derives a diameter of 9.36 kilometers based on an absolute magnitude of 12.31.

== Naming ==
This minor planet was named after German mathematician Georg Wallenberg (1864–1924). The official naming citation was mentioned in The Names of the Minor Planets by Paul Herget in 1955 (H 107).
