= 853 Nansenia =

Main-belt asteroid

Discovery
- Discovered by: S. Beljavskij
- Discovery site: Simeis
- Discovery date: 2 April 1916

Designations
- Alternative designations: 1916 S28

Orbital characteristics
- Epoch 31 July 2016 (JD 2457600.5)
- Uncertainty parameter 0
- Observation arc: 95.45 yr (34863 d)
- Aphelion: 2.5565 AU (382.45 Gm)
- Perihelion: 2.0686 AU (309.46 Gm)
- Semi-major axis: 2.3125 AU (345.95 Gm)
- Eccentricity: 0.10550
- Orbital period (sidereal): 3.52 yr (1284.5 d)
- Mean anomaly: 156.829°
- Mean motion: 0° 16^{m} 48.972^{s} / day
- Inclination: 9.2173°
- Longitude of ascending node: 182.864°
- Argument of perihelion: 59.947°

Physical characteristics
- Mean radius: 13.50±0.4 km
- Synodic rotation period: 7.931 h (0.3305 d)
- Geometric albedo: 0.0511±0.003
- Absolute magnitude (H): 11.67

853 Nansenia is a minor planet orbiting the Sun. It is named after the Norwegian polar explorer and Nobel Peace Prize laureate Fridtjof Nansen.
