= 1006 Lagrangea =

Main-belt asteroid

Discovery
- Discovered by: S. Belyavskyj
- Discovery site: Simeiz Obs.
- Discovery date: 12 September 1923

Designations
- Pronunciation: /ləˈɡrɒndʒiə/
- Named after: Joseph-Louis Lagrange (Italian astronomer)
- Alternative designations: 1923 OU
- Minor planet category: main-belt · (outer)

Orbital characteristics
- Epoch 4 September 2017 (JD 2458000.5)
- Uncertainty parameter 0
- Observation arc: 93.73 yr (34,235 days)
- Aphelion: 4.2641 AU
- Perihelion: 2.0210 AU
- Semi-major axis: 3.1425 AU
- Eccentricity: 0.3569
- Orbital period (sidereal): 5.57 yr (2,035 days)
- Mean anomaly: 283.17°
- Mean motion: 0° 10^{m} 36.84^{s} / day
- Inclination: 10.917°
- Longitude of ascending node: 294.59°
- Argument of perihelion: 86.231°

Physical characteristics
- Dimensions: 29.53 km (derived); 29.56±2.3 km 30.36±6.84 km 32.24±1.16 km 35.310±0.345 km
- Synodic rotation period: 32.79±0.06 h
- Geometric albedo: 0.046±0.006; 0.0469±0.0064; 0.058±0.005; 0.06±0.03; 0.0612 (derived); 0.0670±0.012
- Spectral type: D · C
- Absolute magnitude (H): 11.20 · 11.30 · 11.36±0.19

Lagrangea (minor planet designation: 1006 Lagrangea), provisional designation 1923 OU, is a carbonaceous background asteroid from the outer region of the asteroid belt, approximately 30 kilometers in diameter. It was discovered on 12 September 1923, by Russian astronomer Sergey Belyavsky at the Simeiz Observatory on the Crimean peninsula. The asteroid was named after Italian mathematician and astronomer Joseph-Louis Lagrange.

== Orbit and classification ==
Lagrangea is not a member of any known asteroid family. It orbits the Sun in the outer main belt at a distance of 2.0–4.3 AU once every 5 years and 7 months (2,035 days). Its orbit has an eccentricity of 0.36 and an inclination of 11° with respect to the ecliptic. The body's observation arc begins at the discovering observatory, 4 days after its official discovery observation.

== Physical characteristics ==
Lagrangea has been characterized as a dark D-type asteroid by Pan-STARRS photometric survey, while the LCDB assumes a generic, carbonaceous C-type.

=== Rotation period ===
In September 2001, a rotational lightcurve of Lagrangea was obtained from photometric observations by French amateur astronomer Laurent Bernasconi. Lightcurve analysis gave a longer-than-average rotation period of 32.79 hours with a brightness amplitude of 0.17 magnitude. As the lightcurve has received a low quality rating, the obtained period must be considered tentative (U=1).

=== Diameter and albedo ===
According to the surveys carried out by the Infrared Astronomical Satellite IRAS, the Japanese Akari satellite and the NEOWISE mission of NASA's Wide-field Infrared Survey Explorer, Lagrangea measures between 29.56 and 35.31 kilometers in diameter and its surface has an albedo between 0.046 and 0.067.

The Collaborative Asteroid Lightcurve Link derives an albedo of 0.0612 and a diameter of 29.53 kilometers based on an absolute magnitude of 11.3.

== Naming ==
This minor planet was named after Italian mathematician Joseph-Louis Lagrange (1736–1813), who made significant contributions to astronomy, in particular celestial mechanics. The official naming citation was mentioned in The Names of the Minor Planets by Paul Herget in 1955 (H 96). The Lagrangian points are named after him. He is also honored by the lunar crater Lagrange.
