= 1031 Arctica =

Dark asteroid from the outer region of the asteroid belt

Discovery
- Discovered by: S. Belyavskyj
- Discovery site: Simeiz Obs.
- Discovery date: 6 June 1924

Designations
- Pronunciation: /ˈɑːrtɪkə/
- Named after: Arctic Ocean
- Alternative designations: 1924 RR · A910 VB; A913 JA
- Minor planet category: main-belt · (outer)

Orbital characteristics
- Epoch 16 February 2017 (JD 2457800.5)
- Uncertainty parameter 0
- Observation arc: 92.59 yr (33,820 days)
- Aphelion: 3.2208 AU
- Perihelion: 2.8767 AU
- Semi-major axis: 3.0487 AU
- Eccentricity: 0.0564
- Orbital period (sidereal): 5.32 yr (1,944 days)
- Mean anomaly: 242.71°
- Mean motion: 0° 11^{m} 6.72^{s} / day
- Inclination: 17.634°
- Longitude of ascending node: 218.92°
- Argument of perihelion: 307.14°

Physical characteristics
- Dimensions: 73.83±20.13 km 74.78±19.68 km 75.400±0.497 km 75.47±1.5 km (IRAS:21); 75.784±1.399 km 77.28±1.05 km 87.61±0.64 km
- Synodic rotation period: 51.0 h 51.0±0.5 h 51±2 h
- Geometric albedo: 0.035±0.004; 0.04±0.01; 0.04±0.03; 0.044±0.001; 0.0461±0.0046; 0.0465±0.002 (IRAS:21)
- Spectral type: B–V = 0.680; U–B = 0.325; Tholen = CX: · CX:
- Absolute magnitude (H): 9.51 · 9.56

1031 Arctica, provisional designation 1924 RR, is a dark asteroid from the outer region of the asteroid belt, approximately 75 kilometers in diameter. It was discovered on 6 June 1924, by Soviet−Russian astronomer Sergey Belyavsky at Simeiz Observatory on the Crimean peninsula. It was named for the Arctic Sea.

== Classification and orbit ==
Arctica orbits the Sun in the outer main-belt at a distance of 2.9–3.2 AU once every 5 years and 4 months (1,944 days). Its orbit has an eccentricity of 0.06 and an inclination of 18° with respect to the ecliptic. Prior to its discovery, Arctica was identified as A910 VB and A913 JA at Collurania and Johannesburg in 1910 and 1913, respectively. The body's observation arc begins with its official discovery observation at Simeiz in 1924.

== Physical characteristics ==
In the Tholen taxonomic classification scheme, Arctica is a rather rare CX: type, an intermediary between the carbonaceous C and X-type asteroids (also see category listing).

=== Rotation period ===
In February 1992, the first rotational lightcurve of Arctica was obtained by Italian astronomer Mario Di Martino at Torino Observatory, using the ESO 1-metre telescope at La Silla in Chile. It gave a rotation period of 51.0 hours with a change in brightness of 0.22 magnitude (U=2).

Since then, photometric observations were taken by French amateur astronomers Raymond Poncy (2005), René Roy (2010) and Patrick Sogorb (2016), giving an identical period of 51 hours, based on a fragmentary and poorly rated lightcurve (U=1/n.a./1). While Arctica has a much longer period than most minor planets, it is not a slow rotator, which have periods up to a 1000 or more hours.

=== Diameter and albedo ===
According to the space-based surveys carried out by the Infrared Astronomical Satellite IRAS, the Japanese Akari satellite, and NASA's Wide-field Infrared Survey Explorer with its subsequent NEOWISE mission, Arctica measures between 73.83 and 77.28 kilometers in diameter and its surface has a low albedo between 0.04 and 0.047 (without preliminary results). The Collaborative Asteroid Lightcurve Link adopts the results obtained by IRAS, that is, an albedo of 0.0465 and a diameter of 75.47 kilometers with an absolute magnitude of 9.56.

== Naming ==
This minor planet was named for the Arctic Sea, located in the Northern Hemisphere and the smallest and shallowest of the world's five major oceanic divisions. Naming citation was first published in The Names of the Minor Planets by Paul Herget in 1955 (H 98).
