= 978 Aidamina =

Main-belt asteroid

Discovery
- Discovered by: S. Belyavskyj
- Discovery site: Simeiz Obs.
- Discovery date: 18 May 1922

Designations
- Named after: Aida Minaevna (discoverer's friend)
- Alternative designations: 1922 LY · 1929 YA; 1946 QD · 1966 BD; A906 VB · A923 YA
- Minor planet category: main-belt · (outer) background

Orbital characteristics
- Epoch 16 February 2017 (JD 2457800.5)
- Uncertainty parameter 0
- Observation arc: 110.15 yr (40,232 days)
- Aphelion: 3.9462 AU
- Perihelion: 2.4492 AU
- Semi-major axis: 3.1977 AU
- Eccentricity: 0.2341
- Orbital period (sidereal): 5.72 yr (2,089 days)
- Mean anomaly: 119.30°
- Mean motion: 0° 10^{m} 20.64^{s} / day
- Inclination: 21.645°
- Longitude of ascending node: 216.64°
- Argument of perihelion: 132.94°

Physical characteristics
- Dimensions: 78.73±2.3 km (IRAS:17); 78.78±29.26 km 79.54±22.88 km 82.28±2.71 km 92.105±0.764 km
- Mass: (1.27±0.54)×10^{18} kg (Note: Calculated from its standard gravitational parameter GM = 0.085±0.036 km^{3}/s^{2}.)
- Mean density: 3.11 g/cm^{3} (Note: Assuming a diameter of 92.1 km.)
- Synodic rotation period: 9.5 h 10.098±0.001 h 10.099±0.004 h 10.100±0.003 h
- Geometric albedo: 0.027±0.004; 0.035±0.002; 0.0365±0.002 (IRAS:17); 0.04±0.02; 0.04±0.03
- Spectral type: B–V = 0.677; U–B = 0.252; Tholen = PF · PF
- Absolute magnitude (H): 9.08±0.64 · 9.56 · 9.73

978 Aidamina, provisional designation 1922 LY, is a dark background asteroid from the outer region of the asteroid belt, approximately 79 kilometers (49 miles) in diameter. It was discovered by astronomer Sergey Belyavsky in 1922, and later named after Aida Minaevna, a friend of the discoverer's family.

== Discovery ==
Aidamina was discovered on 18 May 1922, by Soviet–Russian astronomer Sergey Belyavsky at Simeiz Observatory on the Crimean peninsula, Twelve nights later, the body was independently discovered by Max Wolf at Heidelberg in Germany.

In 1906, it was first observed as A906 VB at Heidelberg. Aidamina's observation arc begins at Vienna, one month after its official discovery. The Minor Planet Center's observational records do not include the body's discovery observation at Simeiz from May 1922.

== Orbit and classification ==
Aidamina is a non-family asteroid from the main belt's background population. It orbits the Sun in the outer asteroid belt at a distance of 2.4–3.9 AU once every 5 years and 9 months (2,089 days). Its orbit has an eccentricity of 0.23 and an inclination of 22° with respect to the ecliptic.

== Naming ==
This minor planet was named after a friend of the discoverer's family, Aida Minaevna. The author of the Dictionary of Minor Planet Names, Lutz Schmadel, compiled this citation asking several Russian astronomers including Nikolai Chernykh for further information.

== Physical characteristics ==
In the Tholen taxonomy, Aidamina is the only asteroid classified as PF-type asteroid, a transitional class between the carbonaceous F-type and dark P-type asteroids, of which only a few dozens bodies are currently known.

=== Rotation period ===
In 2003, three mostly fragmentary lightcurves of Aidamina were obtained by astronomers Maurice Clark at Montgomery College (9.5 hours; Δ0.1 mag; U=1), French amateur astronomers Laurent Bernasconi and Jean-Gabriel Bosch (10.100 hours; Δ0.1 mag; U=1), and a group of astronomers including Elaine Kirkpatrick at Rose-Hulman Observatory in Indiana, United States (10.099 hours; Δ0.13 mag; U=2).

In July 2014, a rather asymmetric bimodal lightcurve, obtained by a collaboration between American astronomers Frederick Pilcher and Andrea Ferrero, gave a more refine rotation period of 10.098 hours with a brightness variation of 0.24 magnitude.(U=3).

=== Diameter and albedo ===
According to the surveys carried out by the Infrared Astronomical Satellite IRAS, the Japanese Akari satellite, and NASA's Wide-field Infrared Survey Explorer with its subsequent NEOWISE mission, Aidamina measures between 78.73 and 82.28 kilometers in diameter, and its surface has a low albedo between 0.035 and 0.04 (without preliminary results).

The Collaborative Asteroid Lightcurve Link adopts the results obtained from 17 observations made by IRAS, that is, an albedo of 0.0365 and a diameter of 78.73 kilometers with an absolute magnitude of 9.73.
