= Simeiz Vallis =

Vallis on Mercury

- Feature type: Vallis
- Coordinates: 13.2°S 64.3°W
- Eponym: Simeiz Observatory

Simeiz Vallis is a valley at 13.2 S, 64.3 W on Mercury. It is named after Simeiz Observatory. The name of the valley has since been dropped by the IAU, without being replaced by a new name.
