= 981 Martina =

Main-belt asteroid

Discovery
- Discovered by: S. Belyavskyj
- Discovery site: Simeiz Obs.
- Discovery date: 23 September 1917

Designations
- Named after: Henri Martin (French historian)
- Alternative designations: A917 SW · 1917 Σ92; 1906 SD · 1928 TG; 1942 EY · 1949 MF; 1953 FG · 1959 GF; 1959 JF · 1966 QA; A906 SD
- Minor planet category: main-belt · (outer); Themis

Orbital characteristics
- Epoch 31 May 2020 (JD 2459000.5)
- Uncertainty parameter 0
- Observation arc: 112.98 yr (41,266 d)
- Aphelion: 3.7284 AU
- Perihelion: 2.4685 AU
- Semi-major axis: 3.0984 AU
- Eccentricity: 0.2033
- Orbital period (sidereal): 5.45 yr (1,992 d)
- Mean anomaly: 309.55°
- Mean motion: 0° 10^{m} 50.52^{s} / day
- Inclination: 2.0633°
- Longitude of ascending node: 46.062°
- Argument of perihelion: 297.91°

Physical characteristics
- Mean diameter: 28.87±1.7 km; 31.70±1.29 km; 32.545±0.124 km
- Synodic rotation period: 11.267±0.003 h
- Geometric albedo: 0.106±0.020; 0.108±0.010; 0.1254±0.016
- Spectral type: Tholen = CFU: C (SDSS-MOC); B (S3OS2); B–V = 0.620±0.020; U–B = 0.330±0.020
- Absolute magnitude (H): 10.9

981 Martina (prov. designation: A917 SW or 1917 Σ92) is a carbonaceous Themistian asteroid from the outer regions of the asteroid belt, approximately 31 kilometers (19 miles) in diameter. It was discovered on 23 September 1917, by Russian astronomer Sergey Belyavsky at the Simeiz Observatory on the Crimean peninsula. The C/B-type asteroid has a rotation period of 11.3 hours. It was named after French historian and revolutionary Henri Martin (1810–1883).

== Orbit and classification ==
Martina is a core member of the Themis family (602), a very large family of carbonaceous asteroids, named after 24 Themis. It orbits the Sun in the outer asteroid belt at a distance of 2.5–3.7 AU once every 5 years and 5 months (1,992 days; semi-major axis of 3.1 AU). Its orbit has an eccentricity of 0.20 and an inclination of 2° with respect to the ecliptic. The body's observation arc begins with its first observation as A906 SD (1906 SD) at Lowell Observatory in August 1906, more than 11 years prior to its official discovery observation at Crimea–Simeis.

== Naming ==
This minor planet was named after French historian and revolutionary politician, Henri Martin (1810–1883). The naming was mentioned in The Names of the Minor Planets by Paul Herget in 1955 (H 94).

== Physical characteristics ==
In the SDSS-based taxonomy, Martina is a carbonaceous C-type asteroid, while in the classical Tholen classification, it has been classified as a CFU: asteroid, closest to a C-type and somewhat similar to an F-type, though with an unusual (U) and noisy spectra (:). In both the Tholen- and SMASS-like taxonomy of the Small Solar System Objects Spectroscopic Survey (S3OS2), Martina is a B-type asteroid, a "brighter" variant of the more common C-type. Members of the Themis family are typically classified as C-types with an albedo of 0.07, a value notably lower than for this asteroid at 0.10–0.13 (see below).

=== Rotation period ===
In August 2004, a rotational lightcurve of Martina was obtained from photometric observations by David Higgins at the Hunters Hill Observatory (E14) in Australia. Lightcurve analysis gave a rotation period of 28.87±1.7 hours with a brightness variation of 0.20±0.02 magnitude (U=2). Astronomers at the Palomar Transient Factory in California also determined the period in the R-band on two occasions, measuring 11.263 and 11.268 hours with an amplitude of 0.24 and 0.15 in 2010 and 2012, respectively (U=2/2).

=== Diameter and albedo ===
According to the survey carried out by the Infrared Astronomical Satellite IRAS, the Japanese Akari satellite, and the NEOWISE mission of NASA's Wide-field Infrared Survey Explorer, Franklina measures between 28.8 and 32.5 kilometers in diameter and its surface has an albedo between 0.10 and 0.13. The Collaborative Asteroid Lightcurve Link adopts the results from IRAS, that is, an albedo of 0.1254 and a diameter of 28.87 kilometers, based on an absolute magnitude of 10.9.
