= 851 Zeissia =

Main-belt asteroid

Discovery
- Discovered by: S. Beljavskij
- Discovery site: Simeis
- Discovery date: 2 April 1916

Designations
- Pronunciation: /ˈzaɪsiə/
- Alternative designations: 1916 S26; SIGMA 26; 1950 NS1; 1950 PA1

Orbital characteristics
- Epoch 31 July 2016 (JD 2457600.5)
- Uncertainty parameter 0
- Observation arc: 90.03 yr (32885 d)
- Aphelion: 2.4286 AU (363.31 Gm)
- Perihelion: 2.0276 AU (303.32 Gm)
- Semi-major axis: 2.2281 AU (333.32 Gm)
- Eccentricity: 0.089975
- Orbital period (sidereal): 3.33 yr (1214.8 d)
- Mean anomaly: 101.520°
- Mean motion: 0° 17^{m} 46.86^{s} / day
- Inclination: 2.3920°
- Longitude of ascending node: 141.204°
- Argument of perihelion: 7.2372°

Physical characteristics
- Mean radius: 6.13±0.5 km
- Synodic rotation period: 9.34 h (0.389 d)
- Geometric albedo: 0.2646±0.050
- Absolute magnitude (H): 11.62

851 Zeissia /ˈzaɪsiə/ is an S-type asteroid background asteroid from the inner region of the asteroid belt. Its diameter is about 12 km and it has an albedo of 0.2646. Its rotation period is 9.34 hours.

The asteroid is named after the German optician and company founder Carl Zeiss.
