= 2156 Kate =

Highly elongated background asteroid

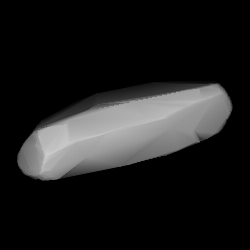
- Shape model of Kate from its lightcurve

Discovery
- Discovered by: S. Belyavsky
- Discovery site: Simeiz Obs.
- Discovery date: 23 September 1917

Designations
- Named after: Kate Kristensen (wife of naming astronomer)
- Alternative designations: A917 SH · 1937 PK; 1954 UT_{2} · 1956 GP; 1957 QK · 1969 BE; 1970 LK · 1974 RL_{1} 1976 GK_{1} · 1979 BC
- Minor planet category: main-belt · (inner)

Orbital characteristics
- Epoch 4 September 2017 (JD 2458000.5)
- Uncertainty parameter 0
- Observation arc: 99.61 yr (36,384 days)
- Aphelion: 2.6942 AU
- Perihelion: 1.7900 AU
- Semi-major axis: 2.2421 AU
- Eccentricity: 0.2016
- Orbital period (sidereal): 3.36 yr (1,226 days)
- Mean anomaly: 264.22°
- Mean motion: 0° 17^{m} 36.96^{s} / day
- Inclination: 5.3475°
- Longitude of ascending node: 17.175°
- Argument of perihelion: 4.7281°

Physical characteristics
- Mean diameter: 8.131±0.144 km 8.61 km (calculated)
- Synodic rotation period: 5.62 h 5.62215±0.00005 h 5.6228±0.0003 h (Note: Dunckel (2011) web: rotation period 5.6228±0.0003 hours with a brightness amplitude of 0.84 mag. (U=3). Summary figures for (2156) Kate at Collaborative Asteroid Lightcurve Link (CALL)); 5.623±0.005 h
- Geometric albedo: 0.189±0.028; 0.20 (assumed); 0.2242±0.0353
- Spectral type: Tholen = S · A B–V = 0.916; U–B = 0.525
- Absolute magnitude (H): 12.69 · 13.23±1.05

2156 Kate (prov. designation: A917 SH) is a highly elongated background asteroid from the inner regions of the asteroid belt. The asteroid was discovered on 23 September 1917, by Soviet–Russian astronomer Sergey Belyavsky at the Simeiz Observatory on the Crimean peninsula. It was named for Kate Kristensen, wife of astronomer L. K. Kristensen. The bright S-type/A-type asteroid has a rotation period of 5.6 hours and measures approximately 8 kilometers (5.0 miles) in diameter.

== Orbit and classification ==
Kate orbits the Sun in the inner main-belt at a distance of 1.8–2.7 AU once every 3 years and 4 months (1,226 days). Its orbit has an eccentricity of 0.20 and an inclination of 5° with respect to the ecliptic. As no precoveries were taken, and no prior identifications were made, the asteroid's observation arc begins with its official discovery observation at Simeiz in 1917.

== Naming ==
This minor planet was named after Kate Kristensen, wife of astronomer L. K. Kristensen, who was involved in the body's orbit computation. The official naming citation was published by the Minor Planet Center on 1 April 1980 (M.P.C. 5284).

== Physical characteristics ==
In the Tholen classification, Kate is a common S-type asteroid. It has also been characterized as a rare A-type asteroid by Pan-STARRS' large photometric survey.

=== Rotation period ===
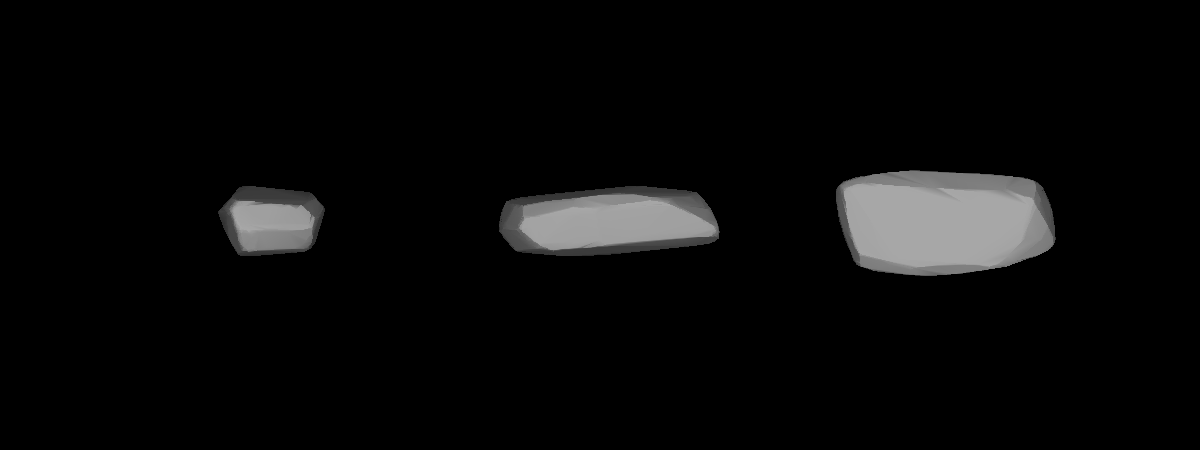
Lightcurve-based 3D-model of Kate

A large number of rotational lightcurves were obtained from photometric observations. They gave a well-defined rotation period of 5.620 to 5.623 hours with a brightness variation between 0.5 and 0.9 magnitude (U=3/3-).

=== Diameter and albedo ===
According to the survey carried out by the NEOWISE mission of NASA's space-based Wide-field Infrared Survey Explorer, Kate measures 8.131 kilometers in diameter and its surface has an albedo of 0.189 and 0.2242, respectively, while the Collaborative Asteroid Lightcurve Link assumes a standard albedo for stony asteroids of 0.20 and calculates a diameter of 8.61 kilometers with an absolute magnitude of 12.69.
