= 969 Leocadia =

Main-belt asteroid

Discovery
- Discovered by: S. Belyavskyj
- Discovery site: Simeiz Obs.
- Discovery date: 5 November 1921

Designations
- Pronunciation: /liːoʊˈkeɪdiə/
- Named after: unknown
- Alternative designations: A921 VC · 1940 RV; 1944 SB · 1948 UG; 1963 PA · 1921 KZ
- Minor planet category: main-belt · (inner) background

Orbital characteristics
- Epoch 31 May 2020 (JD 2459000.5)
- Uncertainty parameter 0
- Observation arc: 98.12 yr (35,837 d)
- Aphelion: 2.9694 AU
- Perihelion: 1.9537 AU
- Semi-major axis: 2.4615 AU
- Eccentricity: 0.2063
- Orbital period (sidereal): 3.86 yr (1,411 d)
- Mean anomaly: 199.53°
- Mean motion: 0° 15^{m} 18.72^{s} / day
- Inclination: 2.2928°
- Longitude of ascending node: 287.76°
- Argument of perihelion: 91.332°

Physical characteristics
- Mean diameter: 17.321±0.218 km; 19.37±0.22 km; 19.51±0.7 km
- Synodic rotation period: 6.87±0.01 h
- Geometric albedo: 0.019±0.005; 0.0435±0.003; 0.045±0.001
- Spectral type: Tholen = FXU: B–V = 0.621±0.010; U–B = 0.227±0.030
- Absolute magnitude (H): 12.8

969 Leocadia (prov. designation: A921 VC or 1921 KZ) is a very dark background asteroid from the inner regions of the asteroid belt, approximately 19 kilometers (12 miles) in diameter. It was discovered on 5 November 1921, by Russian astronomer Sergey Belyavsky at the Simeiz Observatory on the Crimean peninsula. The uncommon F-type asteroid (FX) has a rotation period of 6.9 hours and is likely regular in shape. Any reference of the asteroid's name to a person is unknown.

== Orbit and classification ==
Leocadia is a non-family asteroid of the main belt's background population when applying the hierarchical clustering method to its proper orbital elements. It orbits the Sun in the inner main-belt at a distance of 2.0–3.0 AU once every 3 years and 10 months (1,411 days; semi-major axis of 2.46 AU). Its orbit has an eccentricity of 0.21 and an inclination of 2° with respect to the ecliptic. The body's observation arc begins at Uccle Observatory in February 1933, more than a decade after its official discovery observation Simeiz Observatory on 5 November 1921.

== Naming ==
This minor planet is named after a Feminine Russian first name. Any reference of this name to a person or occurrence is unknown.

=== Unknown meaning ===
Among the many thousands of named minor planets, Leocadia is one of 120 asteroids, for which no official naming citation has been published. All of these low-numbered asteroids have numbers between 164 Eva and 1514 Ricouxa and were discovered between 1876 and the 1930s, predominantly by astronomers Auguste Charlois, Johann Palisa, Max Wolf and Karl Reinmuth.

== Physical characteristics ==
In the Tholen classification (FXU:), Leocadia is an uncommon and dark F-type asteroid, somewhat similar to that of an X-type, though with an unusual (U) and noisy (:) spectra.

=== Rotation period ===
In December 2006, a rotational lightcurve of Leocadia was obtained from photometric observations by Italian amateur astronomers Roberto Crippa and Federico Manzini at the Sozzago Astronomical Station (A12). Lightcurve analysis gave a rotation period of 6.87±0.01 hours with a brightness amplitude of 0.14±0.01 magnitude (U=2), which is indicative of a rather spherical, non-irregular shape.

=== Diameter and albedo ===
According to the surveys carried out by the NEOWISE mission of NASA's Wide-field Infrared Survey Explorer (WISE), the Japanese Akari satellite, and the Infrared Astronomical Satellite IRAS, Leocadia measures 17.321±0.218, 19.37±0.22 and 19.51±0.7 kilometers in diameter, and its surface has a very low albedo of 0.019±0.005, 0.0435±0.003 and 0.045±0.001, respectively. Additional measurements by the WISE telescope were published giving a mean diameter as low as 13.58±3.09 km. The Collaborative Asteroid Lightcurve Link adopts the result from IRAS, that is, an albedo of 0.0435 and a diameter of 19.51 kilometers based on an absolute magnitude of 9.22.

An asteroid occultation on 19 August 2013, gave a best-fit ellipse dimension of 19.0 × 19.0 kilometers. These timed observations are taken when the asteroid passes in front of a distant star. However the measurements for Leocadia were of poor quality.
