= 1004 Belopolskya =

Main-belt asteroid

Discovery
- Discovered by: S. Belyavskyj
- Discovery site: Simeiz Obs.
- Discovery date: 5 September 1923

Designations
- Named after: Aristarkh Belopolsky (astrophysicist)
- Alternative designations: 1923 OS · 1936 WB; 1937 YB · 1938 AA; 1963 DC · 1974 WK; 2004 SU_{12} · A917 TA
- Minor planet category: main-belt · (outer) · Cybele

Orbital characteristics
- Epoch 16 February 2017 (JD 2457800.5)
- Uncertainty parameter 0
- Observation arc: 92.89 yr (33,928 days)
- Aphelion: 3.6994 AU
- Perihelion: 3.1054 AU
- Semi-major axis: 3.4024 AU
- Eccentricity: 0.0873
- Orbital period (sidereal): 6.28 yr (2,292 days)
- Mean anomaly: 322.58°
- Mean motion: 0° 9^{m} 25.2^{s} / day
- Inclination: 2.9787°
- Longitude of ascending node: 153.54°
- Argument of perihelion: 215.17°

Physical characteristics
- Dimensions: 71.60±2.1 km (IRAS:9); 79.83±1.33 km
- Synodic rotation period: 9.44±0.01 h
- Geometric albedo: 0.028±0.001; 0.0348±0.002 (IRAS:9)
- Spectral type: B–V = 0.720; U–B = 0.120; Tholen = PC · PC
- Absolute magnitude (H): 9.99 · 10.02±0.29

Belopolskya (minor planet designation: 1004 Belopolskya), provisional designation 1923 OS, is a dark Cybele asteroid from the outermost region of the asteroid belt, approximately 75 kilometers (47 mi) in diameter. It was named for Russian astrophysicist Aristarkh Belopolsky.

== Discovery ==
Belopolskya was discovered on 5 September 1923, by Russian astronomer Sergey Belyavsky at Simeiz Observatory on the Crimean peninsula. Eight nights later, the body was independently discovered by Karl Reinmuth at Heidelberg in Germany.

It was first identified as A917 TA at Simeiz in 1917. The body's observation arc begins with the above-mentioned Heidelberg-observation following its official discovery.

== Classification and orbit ==
Belopolskya orbits the Sun at a distance of 3.1–3.7 AU once every 6 years and 3 months (2,292 days). Its orbit has an eccentricity of 0.09 and an inclination of 3° with respect to the ecliptic. With these orbital parameters, it belongs to the Cybele asteroids, a dynamical group named after one of the largest asteroids, 65 Cybele.

== Physical characteristics ==
Belopolskya is classified as a PF-type asteroid in the Tholen taxonomy, a subtype of the dark and reddish P-type asteroids. A few dozens of these bodies are known, most of them are Jupiter trojans or reside in the outermost main-belt.

=== Diameter and albedo ===
According to the surveys carried out by the Infrared Astronomical Satellite IRAS and the Japanese Akari satellite, Belopolskya measures 71.60 and 79.83 kilometers in diameter, and its surface has an albedo of 0.0348 and 0.028, respectively. The Collaborative Asteroid Lightcurve Link adopts the shorter diameter obtained by IRAS.

=== Rotation period ===
A rotational lightcurve of Belopolskya, obtained by Italian amateur astronomer Silvano Casulli in July 2010, gave a rotation period of 9.44 hours with a brightness variation of 0.14 magnitude (U=2). No other lightcurves have been obtained.

== Naming ==
This minor planet was named in honor of Aristarkh Belopolsky (1854–1934), astrophysicist at Pulkovo Observatory, the principal astronomical observatory of the Russian Academy of Sciences, which is located south of Saint Petersburg in Russia. Belopolsky is also honored by the lunar crater Belopol'skiy. Naming citation was first mentioned in The Names of the Minor Planets by Paul Herget in 1955 (H 96).
