= 857 Glasenappia =

Main-belt asteroid

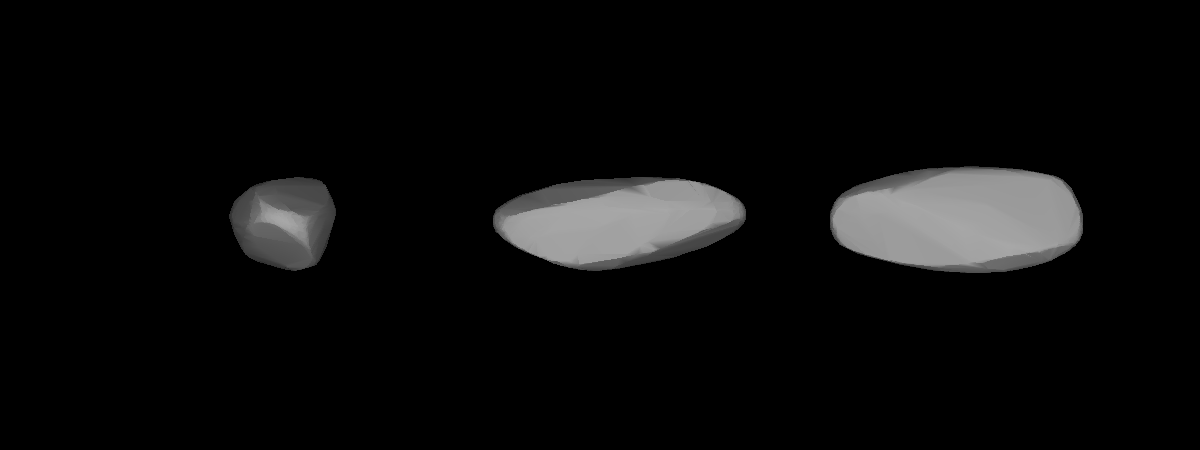
- A three-dimensional model of 857 Glasenappia based on its light curve

Discovery
- Discovered by: S. Beljavskij
- Discovery site: Simeis
- Discovery date: 6 April 1916

Designations
- Named after: Sergey Glazenap
- Alternative designations: 1916 S33

Orbital characteristics
- Epoch 31 July 2016 (JD 2457600.5)
- Uncertainty parameter 0
- Observation arc: 95.56 yr (34905 days)
- Aphelion: 2.3843 AU (356.69 Gm)
- Perihelion: 1.9975 AU (298.82 Gm)
- Semi-major axis: 2.1909 AU (327.75 Gm)
- Eccentricity: 0.088278
- Orbital period (sidereal): 3.24 yr (1184.5 d)
- Mean anomaly: 232.96°
- Mean motion: 0° 18^{m} 14.112^{s} / day
- Inclination: 5.2999°
- Longitude of ascending node: 82.932°
- Argument of perihelion: 238.854°
- Earth MOID: 0.989921 AU (148.0901 Gm)
- Jupiter MOID: 2.81688 AU (421.399 Gm)
- T_{Jupiter}: 3.662

Physical characteristics
- Mean radius: 7.515±0.35 km
- Synodic rotation period: 8.23 h (0.343 d)
- Geometric albedo: 0.2318±0.024
- Absolute magnitude (H): 11.32

857 Glasenappia is a minor planet orbiting the Sun. It was named after Russian astronomer Sergey Glazenap, who was often referred to as "S. de Glasenapp" in pre-Revolution publications.
