= 490 Veritas =

Main-belt asteroid

Discovery
- Discovered by: Max Wolf
- Discovery site: Heidelberg Obs.
- Discovery date: 3 September 1902

Designations
- Pronunciation: /ˈvɛrɪtæs/
- Alternative designations: 1902 JP
- Minor planet category: main-belt · (outer); Veritas
- Adjectives: Veritasian

Orbital characteristics
- Epoch 31 July 2016 (JD 2457600.5)
- Uncertainty parameter 0
- Observation arc: 113.37 yr (41409 d)
- Aphelion: 3.4715 AU (519.33 Gm)
- Perihelion: 2.8719 AU (429.63 Gm)
- Semi-major axis: 3.1717 AU (474.48 Gm)
- Eccentricity: 0.094527
- Orbital period (sidereal): 5.65 yr (2063.2 d)
- Mean anomaly: 31.094°
- Mean motion: 0° 10^{m} 28.164^{s} / day
- Inclination: 9.2809°
- Longitude of ascending node: 178.335°
- Argument of perihelion: 194.390°
- Earth MOID: 1.87147 AU (279.968 Gm)
- Jupiter MOID: 1.98443 AU (296.867 Gm)
- T_{Jupiter}: 3.175

Physical characteristics
- Mean diameter: 114.87±3.64 km (composite estimate); 115.55±5.5 km
- Mass: (1.35±0.30)×10^{18} kg (Note: Calculated from its standard gravitational parameter GM = 0.090±0.020 km^{3}/s^{2}.)
- Mean density: 1.54 g/cm^{3} (Note: Assuming a diameter of 119 km.)
- Synodic rotation period: 7.930 h (0.3304 d)
- Geometric albedo: 0.0622±0.006
- Absolute magnitude (H): 8.53, 8.32

490 Veritas is a carbonaceous Veritasian asteroid, which may have been involved in one of the more massive asteroid-asteroid collisions of the past 100 million years. It was discovered by German astronomer Max Wolf at Heidelberg Observatory on 3 September 1902.

== Description ==
With a diameter of more than 100 kilometers, Veritas is the largest member and namesake of the Veritas family, a mid-sized asteroid family of carbonaceous asteroids in the outer main-belt, that formed recently approximately 8.5±0.5 million years ago. David Nesvorný of the Southwest Research Institute in Boulder traced the orbits of these bodies back in time, and calculated that they formed in a collision of a body at least 150 km in diameter with a smaller asteroid. Veritas and Undina would have been the largest fragments of that collision which caused a "late Miocene dust shower". The family consists of more than a thousand known members including 1086 Nata, 2428 Kamenyar and 2934 Aristophanes.

=== Late Miocene dust shower ===
Substantiating Nesvorný's estimate, Kenneth Farley et al. found evidence in sea-floor sediments of a fourfold increase in the amount of cosmic dust reaching Earth's surface, which began 8.2 million years ago and tapered off over the next million and a half years. This is one of the largest increases in dust deposits of the past 100 million years.

The suspected Veritas collision would have been too far from Jupiter for the fragments to have been slung into a collision course with Earth. However, solar radiation would have caused the resulting dust to drift inward to Earth orbit over a time span consistent with the record of dust in the ocean sediment.

Today continuing collisions among Veritas-family asteroids are estimated to send five thousand tons of cosmic dust to Earth each year, 15% of the total.

== Study ==
490 Veritas has been observed to occult 13 stars between 2006 and 2023.
