= 1062 Ljuba =

Carbonaceous background asteroid

Discovery
- Discovered by: S. Belyavskyj
- Discovery site: Simeiz Obs.
- Discovery date: 11 October 1925

Designations
- Named after: Ljuba Berlin (Soviet parachutist)
- Alternative designations: 1925 TD · 1943 EH_{1} 1976 MM · A904 TB; A914 SD · A917 GB; A924 ND
- Minor planet category: main-belt · (outer) background

Orbital characteristics
- Epoch 23 March 2018 (JD 2458200.5)
- Uncertainty parameter 0
- Observation arc: 91.55 yr (33,437 d)
- Aphelion: 3.2145 AU
- Perihelion: 2.7948 AU
- Semi-major axis: 3.0046 AU
- Eccentricity: 0.0698
- Orbital period (sidereal): 5.21 yr (1,902 d)
- Mean anomaly: 218.82°
- Mean motion: 0° 11^{m} 21.12^{s} / day
- Inclination: 5.5963°
- Longitude of ascending node: 341.40°
- Argument of perihelion: 101.41°

Physical characteristics
- Mean diameter: 44±4 km 51.017±0.887 km 55.10±2.0 km 55.75±0.96 km 57.16±13.41 km 58.031±1.315 km 60.80±14.17 km
- Synodic rotation period: 33.8±0.2 h 36 h (poor); 41.5±0.2 h 42 h (poor)
- Geometric albedo: 0.060±0.007; 0.06±0.06; 0.0668±0.005; 0.067±0.003; 0.0779±0.0156; 0.12±0.06
- Spectral type: C (Tholen); B–V = 0.720
- Absolute magnitude (H): 9.85; 10.09

1062 Ljuba, provisional designation 1925 TD, is a carbonaceous background asteroid from the outer regions of the asteroid belt, approximately 58 kilometers (36 miles) in diameter. The asteroid was discovered on 11 October 1925, by Soviet–Russian astronomer Sergey Belyavsky at the Simeiz Observatory on the Crimean peninsula. It was named after female paratrooper Ljuba Berlin, who died at an early age. The C-type asteroid has a longer-than average rotation period of 33.8 hours.

== Orbit and classification ==
Ljuba is a non-family asteroid from the main belt's background population. It orbits the Sun in the outer asteroid belt at a distance of 2.8–3.2 AU once every 5 years and 3 months (1,902 days; semi-major axis of 3 AU). Its orbit has an eccentricity of 0.07 and an inclination of 6° with respect to the ecliptic.

The asteroid was first observed as A904 TB at Heidelberg Observatory in October 1904. The body's observation arc also begins at Heidelberg in February 1929, or 16 months after its official discovery observation at Simeiz.

== Physical characteristics ==
In the Tholen classification, Ljuba is a carbonaceous C-type asteroid.

=== Rotation period ===
In October 2003, a rotational lightcurve of Ljuba was obtained from photometric observations by American amateur astronomer Walter Cooney at this Blackberry Observatory (929) in Port Allen, Louisiana. Lightcurve analysis gave a well-defined rotation period of 33.8 hours with a brightness variation of 0.17 magnitude (U=3). Lower-rated lightcurves by Richard Binzel, René Roy and Laurent Bernasconi gave a somewhat longer period of 36, 41.5 and 42 hours, respectively (U=1/2/1). While not being a slow rotator, Ljuba's period is significantly longer than that for most other asteroids, which rotate every 2–20 hours once around their axis.

=== Diameter and albedo ===
According to the surveys carried out by the Infrared Astronomical Satellite IRAS, the Japanese Akari satellite and the NEOWISE mission of NASA's Wide-field Infrared Survey Explorer, Ljuba measures between 51.017 and 60.80 kilometers in diameter and its surface has an albedo between 0.060 and 0.12.

The Collaborative Asteroid Lightcurve Link adopts the results obtained by IRAS, that is, an albedo of 0.0668 and a diameter of 55.10 kilometers based on an absolute magnitude of 9.85.

== Naming ==
This minor planet was named after Soviet parachutist Ljuba Berlin (1915–1936). The asteroids (1084) and (1086) were also named after Soviet female paratroopers, namely, Tamara Ivanova (1912–1936) and Nata Babushkina (1915–1936), respectively.
