= 852 Wladilena =

Main-belt asteroid

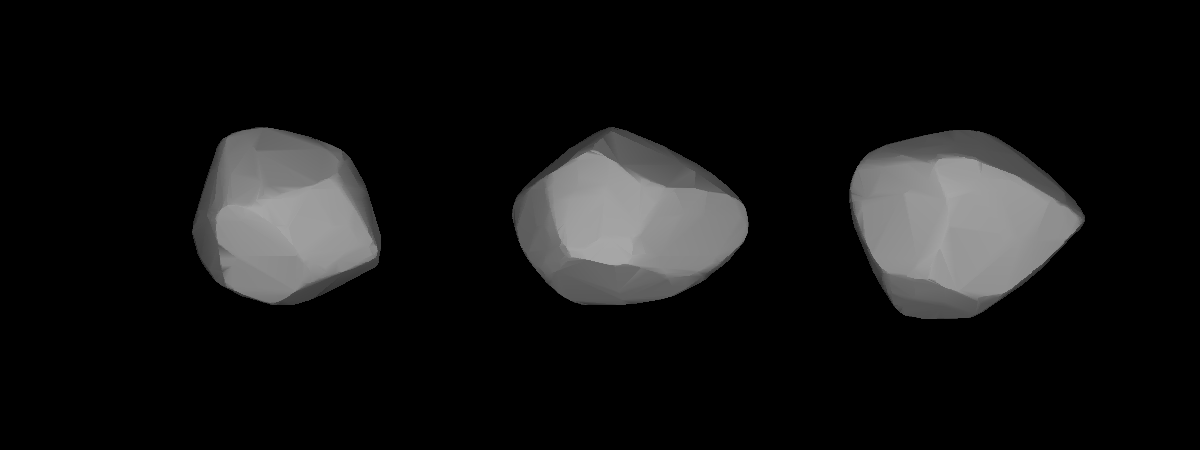
- A three-dimensional model of 852 Wladilena based on its light curve

Discovery
- Discovered by: S. Beljavskij
- Discovery site: Simeis
- Discovery date: 2 April 1916

Designations
- Alternative designations: 1916 S27

Orbital characteristics
- Epoch 31 July 2016 (JD 2457600.5)
- Uncertainty parameter 0
- Observation arc: 92.99 yr (33965 d)
- Aphelion: 3.0112 AU (450.47 Gm)
- Perihelion: 1.7122 AU (256.14 Gm)
- Semi-major axis: 2.3617 AU (353.31 Gm)
- Eccentricity: 0.27501
- Orbital period (sidereal): 3.63 yr (1325.7 d)
- Mean anomaly: 147.622°
- Mean motion: 0° 16^{m} 17.616^{s} / day
- Inclination: 23.019°
- Longitude of ascending node: 27.306°
- Argument of perihelion: 282.313°

Physical characteristics
- Mean radius: 11.505±0.7 km
- Synodic rotation period: 4.6134 h (0.19223 d)
- Geometric albedo: 0.3660±0.047
- Absolute magnitude (H): 10.0

852 Wladilena is a Phocaea asteroid from the inner region of the asteroid belt. It is named after the Russian Communist leader Vladimir Lenin.
