= 1086 Nata =

Main-belt asteroid

Discovery
- Discovered by: S. Belyavskyj; N. Ivanov
- Discovery site: Simeiz Obs.
- Discovery date: 25 August 1927

Designations
- Named after: Nadezhda Babushkina (Soviet female parachutist)
- Alternative designations: 1927 QL · 1925 JA; A900 YB
- Minor planet category: main-belt · (outer); Veritas

Orbital characteristics
- Epoch 4 September 2017 (JD 2458000.5)
- Uncertainty parameter 0
- Observation arc: 116.27 yr (42,467 days)
- Aphelion: 3.3349 AU
- Perihelion: 2.9907 AU
- Semi-major axis: 3.1628 AU
- Eccentricity: 0.0544
- Orbital period (sidereal): 5.62 yr (2,054 days)
- Mean anomaly: 236.41°
- Mean motion: 0° 10^{m} 30.72^{s} / day
- Inclination: 8.3587°
- Longitude of ascending node: 313.24°
- Argument of perihelion: 158.78°

Physical characteristics
- Dimensions: 66.10 km (derived); 66.27±4.3 km 68.24±21.78 km 68.48±0.83 km 73.3±1.3 km 79.867±1.160 km
- Synodic rotation period: 18.074±0.002 h
- Geometric albedo: 0.04±0.03; 0.0528±0.0096; 0.06±0.01; 0.0641 (derived); 0.072±0.002; 0.0767±0.011
- Spectral type: SMASS = Ch · C
- Absolute magnitude (H): 9.30 · 9.5 · 9.54±0.30 · 9.58

1086 Nata, provisional designation 1927 QL, is a carbonaceous Veritasian asteroid from the outer regions of the asteroid belt, approximately 68 kilometers in diameter. It was discovered on 25 August 1927, by Russian astronomers Sergey Belyavsky and Nikolaj Ivanov at the Simeiz Observatory on the Crimean peninsula. The asteroid was named in memory of Soviet female parachutist Nata Babushkina (1915–1936).

== Orbit and classification ==
Nata is a member of the Veritas family, a young family of carbonaceous asteroids, that formed approximately 8.5±0.5 million years ago. The family is named after 490 Veritas and consists of nearly 1,300 members.

Nata orbits the Sun in the outer main-belt at a distance of 3.0–3.3 AU once every 5 years and 7 months (2,054 days). Its orbit has an eccentricity of 0.05 and an inclination of 8° with respect to the ecliptic.

The body's observation arc begins with its first identification as A900 YB at Heidelberg Observatory in December 1900, almost 27 years prior to its official discovery observation at Simeiz.

== Physical characteristics ==
In the SMASS classification, Nata is a Ch-subtype, a "hydrated" carbonaceous C-type asteroid.

=== Rotation period ===
In November 2011, a rotational lightcurve of Nata was obtained from photometric observations by American astronomer Edwin E. Sheridan at the Crescent Butte Observatory (682). Lightcurve analysis gave a rotation period of 18.074 hours with a brightness amplitude of 0.17 magnitude (U=2).

=== Diameter and albedo ===
According to the surveys carried out by the Spitzer Space Telescope, the Infrared Astronomical Satellite IRAS, the Japanese Akari satellite and the NEOWISE mission of NASA's Wide-field Infrared Survey Explorer, Nata measures between 66.27 and 79.867 kilometers in diameter and its surface has an albedo between 0.04 and 0.0767.

The Collaborative Asteroid Lightcurve Link derives an albedo of 0.0641 and a diameter of 66.10 kilometers based on an absolute magnitude of 9.5.

== Naming ==
This minor planet was named in memory of Nadezhda Vasilievna Babushkina (1915–1936), nicknamed "Nata", a Soviet female parachutist who died in an accident at the age of 21. The minor planets (1062) and (1084), were named after paratroopers Tamara Ivanova (1912–1936) and Lyuba Berlin (1915–1936), respectively, which died just three months earlier.
