= 2934 Aristophanes =

Main-belt asteroid

Discovery
- Discovered by: C. J. van Houten; I. van Houten-G. T. Gehrels
- Discovery site: Palomar Obs.
- Discovery date: 25 September 1960

Designations
- Pronunciation: /ˌærɪˈstɒfəniːz/
- Named after: Ἀριστοφάνης Aristophanēs (ancient Greek dramatist)
- Alternative designations: 4006 P-L · 1971 OQ_{1} 1977 RM_{5} · 1980 FC_{9}
- Minor planet category: main-belt · (outer); Veritas

Orbital characteristics
- Epoch 4 September 2017 (JD 2458000.5)
- Uncertainty parameter 0
- Observation arc: 56.24 yr (20,543 days)
- Aphelion: 3.3326 AU
- Perihelion: 3.0085 AU
- Semi-major axis: 3.1705 AU
- Eccentricity: 0.0511
- Orbital period (sidereal): 5.65 yr (2,062 days)
- Mean anomaly: 99.361°
- Mean motion: 0° 10^{m} 28.56^{s} / day
- Inclination: 8.7965°
- Longitude of ascending node: 202.23°
- Argument of perihelion: 89.870°

Physical characteristics
- Dimensions: 21.941±0.390 km
- Geometric albedo: 0.110±0.006
- Spectral type: SMASS = Ch
- Absolute magnitude (H): 11.7

2934 Aristophanes /ˌærɪˈstɒfəniːz/, provisional designation 4006 P-L, is a carbonaceous Veritasian asteroid from the outer regions of the asteroid belt, approximately 22 kilometers in diameter. It was discovered during the Palomar–Leiden survey in 1960, and later named after ancient Greek dramatist Aristophanes.

== Discovery ==
Aristophanes was discovered on 25 September 1960, by Dutch astronomers Ingrid and Cornelis van Houten at Leiden, on photographic plates taken by Tom Gehrels at the Palomar Observatory, California, United States.

=== Palomar–Leiden survey ===
The survey designation P-L stands for "Palomar–Leiden", named after Palomar Observatory and Leiden Observatory, which collaborated on the fruitful Palomar–Leiden survey in the 1960s. Gehrels used Palomar's Samuel Oschin telescope (also known as the 48-inch Schmidt Telescope), and shipped the photographic plates to Ingrid and Cornelis van Houten at Leiden Observatory where astrometry was carried out. The trio are credited with the discovery of several thousand asteroids.

== Orbit and classification ==
Aristophanes is a member of the Veritas family (609), a young family of carbonaceous asteroids, that formed approximately 8.5±0.5 million years ago. The family is named after 490 Veritas and consists of nearly 1,300 members.

It orbits the Sun in the outer main-belt at a distance of 3.0–3.3 AU once every 5 years and 8 months (2,062 days). Its orbit has an eccentricity of 0.05 and an inclination of 9° with respect to the ecliptic. The body's observation arc begins at Palomar, the night prior to its official discovery observation.

== Physical characteristics ==
In the SMASS classification, Aristophanes is a Ch-type, a hydrated subtype of the carbonaceous C-type asteroid with absorption features at 0.7 μm.

=== Rotation period ===
As of 2017, no rotational lightcurve of Aristophanes has been obtained from photometric observations. The asteroid's rotation period, shape and poles remain unknown.

=== Diameter and albedo ===
According to the survey carried out by the NEOWISE mission of NASA's Wide-field Infrared Survey Explorer, Aristophanes measures 21.941 kilometers in diameter and its surface has an albedo of 0.110.

== Naming ==
This minor planet was named after Aristophanes (445–385 B.C.), a Greek comic playwright of ancient Athens. The official naming citation was published by the Minor Planet Center on 29 September 1985 (M.P.C. 10044).
