= 995 Sternberga =

Main-belt asteroid

Discovery
- Discovered by: S. Beljavskij
- Discovery site: Simeis
- Discovery date: 8 June 1923

Designations
- Alternative designations: 1923 NP

Orbital characteristics
- Epoch 31 July 2016 (JD 2457600.5)
- Uncertainty parameter 0
- Observation arc: 112.34 yr (41031 days)
- Aphelion: 3.0547 AU (456.98 Gm)
- Perihelion: 2.1748 AU (325.35 Gm)
- Semi-major axis: 2.6148 AU (391.17 Gm)
- Eccentricity: 0.16825
- Orbital period (sidereal): 4.23 yr (1544.4 d)
- Mean anomaly: 306.02°
- Mean motion: 0° 13^{m} 59.196^{s} / day
- Inclination: 13.054°
- Longitude of ascending node: 221.747°
- Argument of perihelion: 122.464°

Physical characteristics
- Mean diameter: 25.5+1.1 −1.4 km (pole solution 1); 25.2+1.1 −0.9 km (pole solution 2)
- Synodic rotation period: 11.19511±0.00012 h (pole solution 1); 11.19512±0.00008 h (pole solution 2)
- Pole ecliptic longitude: 27° ± 3° or 222° ± 4°
- Pole ecliptic latitude: −20° ± 6° or −26° ± 5°
- Geometric albedo: 0.22+0.03 −0.04 (pole solution 1); 0.226+0.005 −0.032 (pole solution 2)
- Absolute magnitude (H): 10.2

995 Sternberga is a main-belt asteroid discovered in 1923 by Sergei Belyavsky at Simeiz Observatory. It was named after Russian astronomer Pavel Shternberg.

Photometric observations of this asteroid collected during 2004 show a rotation period of 15.26 ± 0.01 hours with a brightness variation of 0.15 ± 0.03 magnitude.
