= 1094 Siberia =

Main-belt asteroid

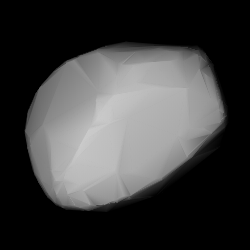
- Shape model of Siberia from its lightcurve

Discovery
- Discovered by: S. Belyavskyj
- Discovery site: Simeiz Obs.
- Discovery date: 12 February 1926

Designations
- Pronunciation: /saɪˈbɪəriə/
- Named after: Siberia (Region in North Asia)
- Alternative designations: 1926 CB · A918 EJ
- Minor planet category: main-belt · (middle); Eunomia

Orbital characteristics
- Epoch 4 September 2017 (JD 2458000.5)
- Uncertainty parameter 0
- Observation arc: 82.07 yr (29,977 days)
- Aphelion: 2.8844 AU
- Perihelion: 2.2048 AU
- Semi-major axis: 2.5446 AU
- Eccentricity: 0.1335
- Orbital period (sidereal): 4.06 yr (1,483 days)
- Mean anomaly: 221.13°
- Mean motion: 0° 14^{m} 34.08^{s} / day
- Inclination: 14.028°
- Longitude of ascending node: 149.14°
- Argument of perihelion: 310.29°

Physical characteristics
- Dimensions: 17.08±6.34 km 17.869±0.180 km 17.87±0.18 km 18.05±1.0 km 18.16 km (derived); 18.36±4.08 km 18.79±0.24 km
- Synodic rotation period: 21.15±0.01 h
- Geometric albedo: 0.089±0.003; 0.0943±0.011; 0.10±0.05; 0.11±0.05; 0.1227 (derived); 0.127±0.012
- Spectral type: SMASS = Xk
- Absolute magnitude (H): 11.60 · 11.7 · 11.81 · 11.90

1094 Siberia (prov. designation: 1926 CB) is an Eunomian asteroid from the central regions of the asteroid belt. It was discovered on 12 February 1926, by Soviet astronomer Sergey Belyavsky at the Simeiz Observatory on the Crimean peninsula. The X-type asteroid (Xk) has a rotation period of 21.2 hours and measures approximately 18 kilometers (11 miles) in diameter. It was named after the vast region of Siberia in North Asia.

== Orbit and classification ==
Siberia is a member of the Eunomia family (502), a prominent family of stony asteroids and the largest one in the intermediate main belt with more than 5,000 members. It orbits the Sun in the central main-belt at a distance of 2.2–2.9 AU once every 4 years and 1 month (1,483 days). Its orbit has an eccentricity of 0.13 and an inclination of 14° with respect to the ecliptic.

The asteroid was first identified as A918 EJ at Heidelberg or Simeiz in March 1918. The body's observation arc begins at Heidelberg in June 1935, more than 9 years after its official discovery observation at Simeiz.

== Naming ==
This minor planet was named after the vast geographic region of Siberia in North Asia, approximately 13.1 million square kilometres (5,100,000 mi^{2}) in area. The official naming citation was mentioned in The Names of the Minor Planets by Paul Herget in 1955 (H 103).

== Physical characteristics ==
In the SMASS classification, Siberia is a Xk-subtype, that transitions from the X-type to the K-type asteroids, while the overall spectral type of the Eunomia family is that of a stony S-type asteroid. It is also an assumed X-type.

=== Slow rotation ===
In December 2006, a first rotational lightcurve of Siberia was obtained from photometric observations by astronomers from New Zealand and Australia. Lightcurve analysis gave a rotation period of 21.15 hours with a brightness amplitude of 0.45 magnitude, indicating a non-spherical shape (U=2). While not being a slow rotator, Siberia has a longer than average rotation period, especially for its size.

=== Diameter and albedo ===
According to the surveys carried out by the Infrared Astronomical Satellite IRAS, the Japanese Akari satellite and the NEOWISE mission of NASA's Wide-field Infrared Survey Explorer, Siberia measures between 17.08 and 18.79 kilometers in diameter and its surface has an albedo between 0.089 and 0.127.

The Collaborative Asteroid Lightcurve Link derives an albedo of 0.1227 and a diameter of 18.16 kilometers based on an absolute magnitude of 11.6.

== In fiction ==
1094 Siberia is mentioned briefly in John Varley's science fiction novel Rolling Thunder, where it is described as "an escape-proof prison" of the Republic of Mars.
