= 856 Backlunda =

Dark background asteroid

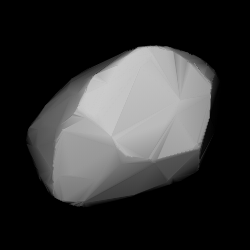
- Shape of Backlunda from modeled lightcurve

Discovery
- Discovered by: S. Belyavskyj
- Discovery site: Simeiz Obs.
- Discovery date: 3 April 1916

Designations
- Named after: Oskar Backlund (Swedish-Russian astronomer)
- Alternative designations: A916 GQ · 1955 PB; 1955 QO_{1} · 1958 LA; 1959 SQ · 1962 MA; A908 CB · 1916 Σ30
- Minor planet category: main-belt · (inner); background

Orbital characteristics
- Epoch 31 May 2020 (JD 2459000.5)
- Uncertainty parameter 0
- Observation arc: 88.67 yr (32,385 d)
- Aphelion: 2.7255 AU
- Perihelion: 2.1440 AU
- Semi-major axis: 2.4348 AU
- Eccentricity: 0.1194
- Orbital period (sidereal): 3.80 yr (1,388 d)
- Mean anomaly: 137.72°
- Mean motion: 0° 15^{m} 33.84^{s} / day
- Inclination: 14.328°
- Longitude of ascending node: 125.54°
- Argument of perihelion: 72.999°

Physical characteristics
- Mean diameter: 43.43±0.50 km; 45.449±0.132 km
- Synodic rotation period: 12.08 h
- Pole ecliptic latitude: (42.0°, 44.0°) (λ_{1}/β_{1}); (226.0°, 73.0°) (λ_{2}/β_{2})
- Geometric albedo: 0.045±0.007; 0.050±0.001
- Spectral type: SMASS = C; C (MOVIS); B–V = 0.680±0.020; V–R = 0.411±0.010
- Absolute magnitude (H): 10.7

856 Backlunda (prov. designation: A916 GQ or 1916 Σ30) is a dark background asteroid from the inner region of the asteroid belt. It was discovered on 3 April 1916, by Russian astronomer Sergey Belyavsky at the Simeiz Observatory on the Crimean peninsula. The carbonaceous C-type asteroid has a rotation period of 12.1 hours and measures approximately 45 kilometers (28 miles) in diameter. It was named after Swedish-Russian astronomer Oskar Backlund (1846–1916).

== Orbit and classification ==
Backlunda is a non-family asteroid of the main belt's background population when applying the hierarchical clustering method to its proper orbital elements. It orbits the Sun in the inner asteroid belt at a distance of 2.1–2.7 AU once every 3 years and 10 months (1,388 days; semi-major axis of 2.43 AU). Its orbit has an eccentricity of 0.12 and an inclination of 14° with respect to the ecliptic. The asteroid was first observed as A908 CB at Taunton Observatory (803) in February 1908. The body's observation arc begins at Algiers Observatory in North Africa on 28 February 1931, almost 15 years after to its official discovery observation at Simeiz.

== Naming ==
This minor planet was named after Swedish-born Russian astronomer Oskar Backlund (1846–1916), who is known for studying the orbit of comets, in particular that of Comet Encke. The naming was mentioned in The Names of the Minor Planets by Paul Herget in 1955 (H 84). The astronomer is also honored by the 75-kilometer lunar crater Backlund.

== Physical characteristics ==
In the Bus–Binzel SMASS classification, Backlunda is a common carbonaceous C-type asteroid. It is also a C-type in the MOVIS catalog of the VISTA Hemisphere Survey conducted with the VISTA telescope at Paranal Observatory in Chile.

=== Rotation period and poles ===
In February 1984, a rotational lightcurve of Backlunda was obtained from photometric observations by Richard Binzel. Lightcurve analysis gave a rotation period of 12.08 hours with a brightness variation of 0.29 magnitude (U=2).

In May 2019, an alternative period determination of 11.965±0.007 hours with an amplitude of 0.09±0.02 magnitude was made by Tom Polakis at the Command Module Observatory (V02) in Arizona (U=2). Additional, tentative lightcurves gave a period of (12.05±0.05 h) by French amateur astronomer Laurent Bernasconi in July 2004, (12.028±0.001 h) by Jean-Gabriel Bosch and Axel Martin in March 2007, and (12.050±0.001 h) by Bruno Christmann, David Augustin and Raoul Behrend in July 2019 (U=2/2/2).

In 2016, a modeled lightcurve gave a concurring sidereal period of 12.02894±0.00005 hours using data from a large collaboration of individual observers (such as above). The study also determined two spin axes of (42.0°, 44.0°) and (226.0°, 73.0°) in ecliptic coordinates (λ,β).

=== Diameter and albedo ===
According to the surveys carried out by the Japanese Akari satellite and the NEOWISE mission of NASA's Wide-field Infrared Survey Explorer, Backlunda measures (43.43±0.50) and (45.449±0.132) kilometers in diameter and its surface has an albedo of (0.050±0.001) and (0.045±0.007), respectively. The Collaborative Asteroid Lightcurve Link assumes a standard albedo for carbonaceous asteroids of 0.057 and derives a diameter of 40.51 kilometers based on an absolute magnitude of 10.69. Alternative mean-diameter measurements published by the WISE team include (42.354±15.82 km), (45.94±16.45 km), (47.09±17.54 km), (49.222±0.414 km) and (67.06±13.72 km) with corresponding albedos of (0.0394), (0.04±0.02), (0.032±0.017), (0.0317±0.0021) and (0.02±0.02). Between 2003 and 2009, several asteroid occultations of Backlunda were observed. The best-rated observations from March 2003, October 2005 and August 2008, gave a best-fit ellipse dimension of (59.5 km × 36.9 km), (57.2 km × 43.8 km) and (48.7 km × 44.7 km), respectively. These timed observations are taken when the asteroid passes in front of a distant star.
