= Sergey Belyavsky =

Soviet/Russian astronomer

Minor planets discovered: 36
see § List of discovered minor planets

Sergey Ivanovich Belyavsky (Russian: Серге́й Ива́нович Беля́вский; December 7, 1883 (Julian calendar: November 25) – October 13, 1953) was a Soviet/Russian astronomer and a discoverer of 36 numbered minor planets.

His last name is also alternatively spelled Beljavskij (name under which the Minor Planet Center credits him) or Beljawskij. His first name is occasionally given as "Sergius". He was born in St. Petersburg and was a member of the Academy of Sciences of the Soviet Union. His field of work included astrophotometry, astrometry, and the study of variable stars. He died in Leningrad.

He discovered the bright naked-eye comet C/1911 S3 (Beljawsky), also known according to the nomenclature of the time as "Comet 1911 IV" or "Comet 1911g". Belyavsky observed at Simeiz Observatory (Симеиз) in Crimea. Between 1937 and 1944, Belyavsky was the seventh director of the Pulkovo Observatory, where he succeeded Boris Gerasimovich.

== List of discovered minor planets ==
749 Malzovia	5 April 1913	list
812 Adele	8 September 1915	list
849 Ara	9 February 1912	list
850 Altona	27 March 1916	list
851 Zeissia	2 April 1916	list
852 Wladilena	2 April 1916	list
853 Nansenia	2 April 1916	list
854 Frostia	3 April 1916	list
855 Newcombia	3 April 1916	list
856 Backlunda	3 April 1916	list
857 Glasenappia	6 April 1916	list
885 Ulrike	23 September 1917	list
969 Leocadia	5 November 1921	list
978 Aidamina	18 May 1922	list
981 Martina	23 September 1917	list

995 Sternberga	8 June 1923	list
1001 Gaussia	8 August 1923	list
1004 Belopolskya	5 September 1923	list
1005 Arago	5 September 1923	list
1006 Lagrangea	12 September 1923	list
1031 Arctica	6 June 1924	list
1062 Ljuba	11 October 1925	list
1065 Amundsenia	4 August 1926	list
1074 Beljawskya	26 January 1925	list
1084 Tamariwa	12 February 1926	list
1086 Nata	25 August 1927	list^{[A]}
1094 Siberia	12 February 1926	list
1118 Hanskya	29 August 1927	list^{[A]}
1153 Wallenbergia	5 September 1924	list
1224 Fantasia	29 August 1927	list^{[A]}

1621 Druzhba	1 October 1926	list
1874 Kacivelia	5 September 1924	list
1984 Fedynskij	10 October 1926	list
2156 Kate	23 September 1917	list
3134 Kostinsky	5 November 1921	list
4509 Gorbatskij	23 September 1917	list
Co-discovery made with:^{A} N. Ivanov
