= Sergey Glazenap =

Russian astronomer

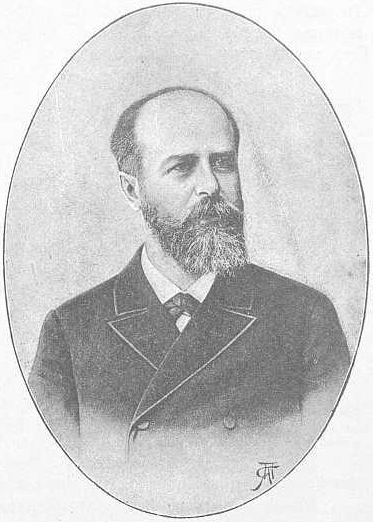
Sergey Glazenap

Sergey Pavlovich Glazenap (Russian: Серге́й Павлович Глазенап; 13(25) September 1848 - 12 April 1937) was a Russian and Soviet astronomer, honorary member of the Soviet Academy of Sciences (1929), and Hero of Socialist Labor (1932). In some publications, particularly in the 19th century, his last name was given as S. de Glasenapp (in French) or von Glasenapp (in German).

He published Orbites des étoiles doubles du catalogue de Poulkova, a study of double stars, for which he was awarded the Valz Prize in 1890.

Glazenap crater on the Moon and the minor planet 857 Glasenappia have been named after him.
