= C/1911 S3 (Beljawsky) =

Parabolic comet

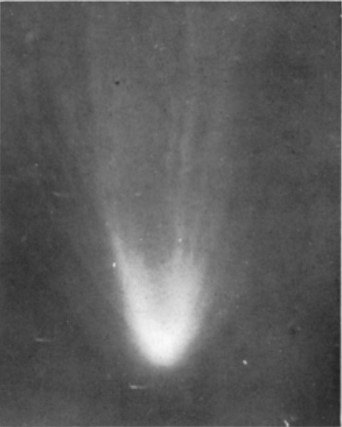
- Comet Beljawsky photographed by Heber D. Curtis in 19 October 1911

Discovery
- Discovered by: Sergei I. Beljawsky
- Discovery date: 29 September 1911

Designations
- Alternative designations: 1911 IV, 1911g

Orbital characteristics
- Epoch: 11 October 1911 (JD 2419320.5)
- Observation arc: 140 days
- Number of observations: 66
- Perihelion: 0.3034 AU
- Semi-major axis: –2064.109 AU
- Eccentricity: 1.000147
- Inclination: 96.466°
- Longitude of ascending node: 89.897°
- Argument of periapsis: 71.711°
- Last perihelion: 10 October 1911

Physical characteristics
- Mean radius: 1.40 km (0.87 mi) (Note: Calculated mean radius using the formula: $\log_{10}\,(\,R\,)\ =\;0.9 +\;0.13 (\,H\,)$ Where $\,H\,$ is the comet's absolute total magnitude (M1))
- Comet total magnitude (M1): 5.8
- Apparent magnitude: 1.0 (1911 apparition)

Comet Beljawsky, formally designated as C/1911 S3, is a non-periodic comet discovered by the Russian astronomer Sergei Ivanovich Beljawsky on 29 September 1911 and shortly thereafter, it was seen independently by four or five other observers in the United States and probably by others throughout the world.

== Observational history ==
At the time it was discovered, the comet was near to the Sun which made observations difficult. However, several days after discovery it was a naked-eye object for a few days in the morning sky and later, after perihelion, as an evening object. It faded rapidly, becoming visible only in telescopes and was last seen on 17 February 1912. The comet sported a tail 8 to 10 degrees in length. In mid-October, the comet was visible in the evening sky together with another bright comet, C/1911 O1 (Brooks).

Comet Beljawsky is a non-periodic comet noteworthy for having a hyperbolic trajectory and so it is not expected to return to the inner Solar System.
