= Simeiz Observatory =

Former observatory on Kosh-Kaya, Crimea

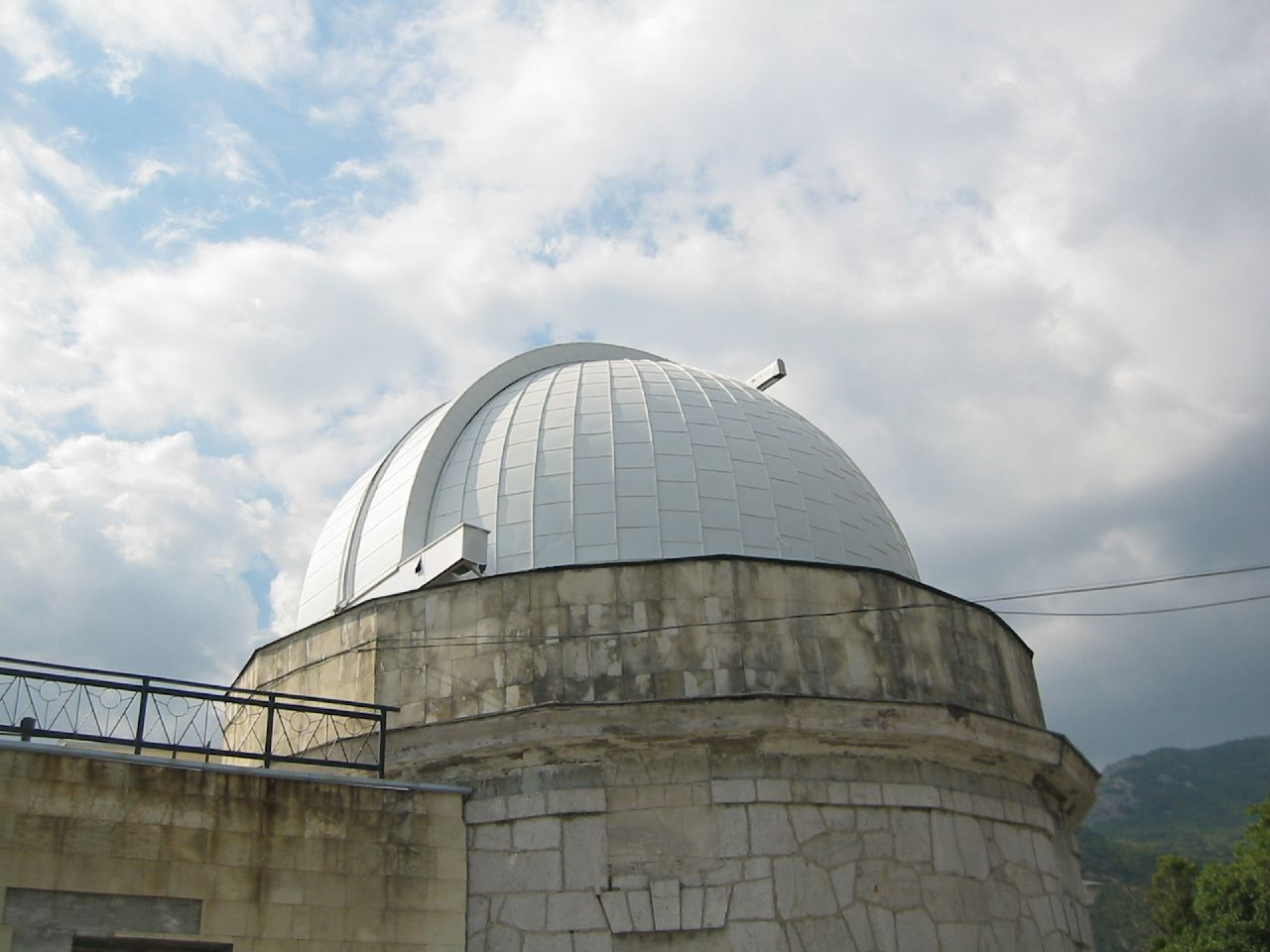
- Named after: Simeiz
- Observatory code: 094
- Location: Yalta Municipality, Autonomous Republic of Crimea, Ukraine
- Coordinates: 44°25′05″N 33°59′51″E
- Altitude: 360 m (1,180 ft)
- Established: 1908
- Telescopes: Simeiz RT-22
- Related media on Commons

Simeiz Observatory (also spelled Simeis or Simeïs) was an astronomy research observatory until the mid-1950s. It is located on Mount Koshka, Crimea, by the town of Simeiz.

Part of the Crimean Astrophysical Observatory, it is currently used for laser based studies of the orbits of satellites.

The Minor Planet Center (MPC) credits Simeiz Observatory as the location where a total of 150 minor planets were discovered by astronomers Grigory Neujmin, Sergey Belyavsky, Vladimir Albitsky, Grigory Shajn, Nikolaj Ivanov, Pelageya Shajn, Praskov'ja Parchomenko, Alexander Deutsch and Evgenij Skvorcov.

As of 2017, the discovery of the minor planet 369010 Ira is directly credited to Simeiz Observatory by the MPC.

== History ==
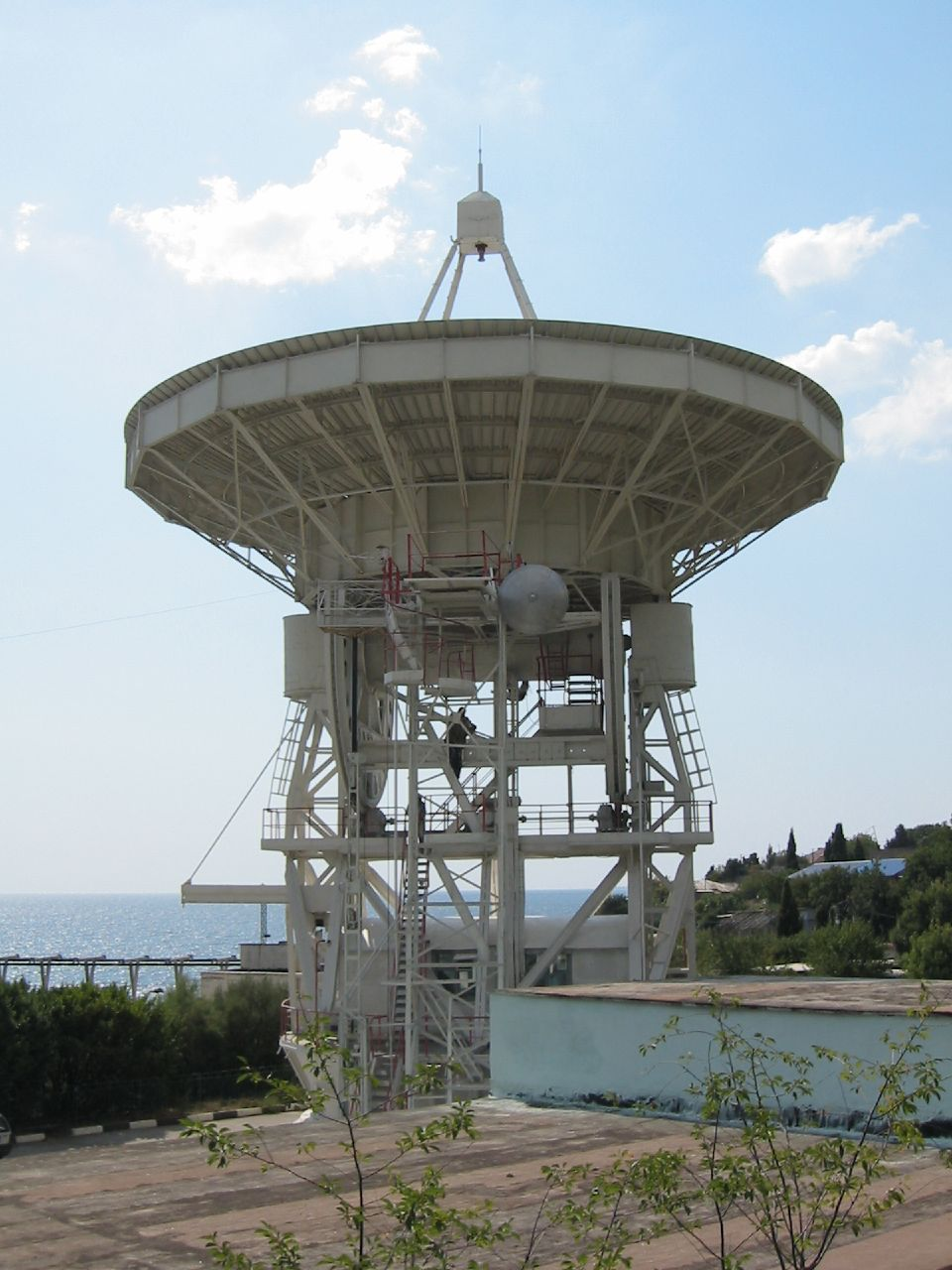
Radiotelescope RT-22 at Simeiz

The Simeiz Observatory was founded by Russian amateur astronomer Nikolai Maltsov, who later became a honored member of the Russian Academy of Sciences and after whom asteroid 749 Malzovia was named. In 1900, he built a tower for refractor at his land plot near Simeiz. In 1906 – a tower with dome for Zeiss double astrograph. Both towers are preserved and being used nowadays. In 1908, Maltsov handed his observatory to Pulkovo Observatory as a present. In 1912, the first astrophysical department of Pulkovo Observatory was officially opened at the south of Russia. Simeiz observatory is situated at the level of 360 m above sea level at southern mountainside of the Crimean mountains, at Koshka mountain. A main building was restored after the Second World War on the basis of old building in modernized style with balconies decorated by columns.

Research of interstellar space and star formation zones, discovery of star rotation, creation of stellar catalogues of radial velocities, study of chemical composition of stars and the Sun brought the world publicity to Simeiz Observatory. The results of research of stars and the Sun represents an independent value.

The department provides observing facilities for astronomers of international community and for its own staff. The following projects currently run:

1. Very Long Baseline Interferometry (VLBI)
2. Multi-wavelength monitoring of Active Galactic Nuclei (AGN)
3. Solar and stellar activity investigations
4. Molecular lines observations at mm wavelengths

== Discoveries ==
Minor planets, whose discovery is directly credited to the observatory.

Minor planets discovered: 1
369010 Ira	18 July 2007	list

In the 1950s the observatory issued several lists of galactic emission nebulas, published by G. A. Shajn and V. F. Gaze (also transliterated Hase) in the Ukrainian "Bulletin of the Crimean Astrophysical Observatory" (Izvestiya Krymskoi Astrofizicheskoi Observatorii) and known collectively as the Simeis catalogue. The catalogue includes Simeis 57 (the Propeller Nebula in Cygnus) and Simeis 147 (the Spaghetti Nebula in Auriga).

== See also ==
- List of minor planet discoverers § Discovering institutions
