= Van Gent (crater) =

Crater on the Moon

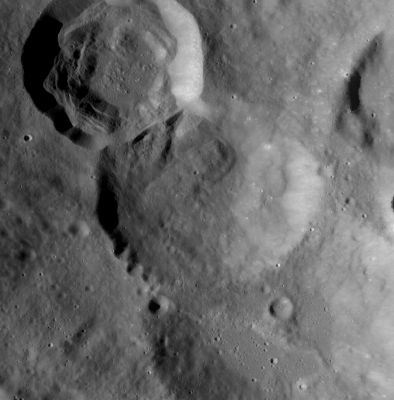
- LRO image
- Coordinates: 15.4°N 160.4°E
- Diameter: 43 km
- Depth: Unknown
- Colongitude: 200° at sunrise
- Eponym: Hendrik van Gent

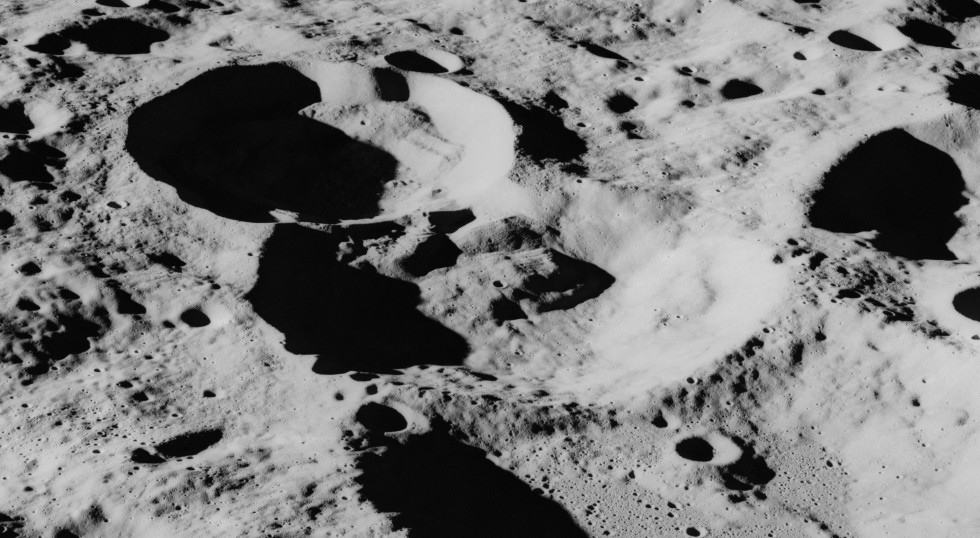
Oblique Apollo 16 image, facing north. Van Gent at center, Van Gent X in upper left.

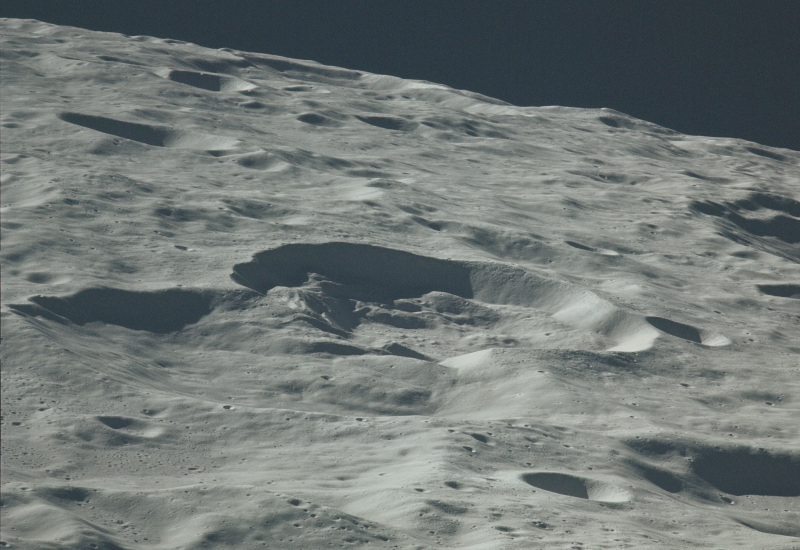
Another Apollo 16 image with Van Gent X at center and Van Gent in lower left

Van Gent is a lunar impact crater on the far side of the Moon that is located to the south-southeast of the larger crater Konstantinov. About an equal distance to the east-southeast is Spencer Jones and to the southeast is Papaleksi.

This crater joins the satellite crater Van Gent X to the northwest to form a double crater. Van Gent also partly overlies what appears to be an older crater remnant to the southeast. This in turn is joined to Van Gent N, which is joined to Van Gent P along its southeastern side. The result is a crater chain of sorts, consisting of five craters forming an arc with the concave side facing to the west.

The rim of Van Gent is slightly distorted from a circle due to the craters with which it has formed. The rim edge is somewhat worn, and a small craterlet lies along the shared rim with Van Gent X. The interior is relatively featureless, marked only by a few tiny craterlets.

The crater is the final resting place of Chinese micro-satellite Longjiang 2, which was crashed there in mid-2019.

== Satellite craters ==
By convention these features are identified on lunar maps by placing the letter on the side of the crater midpoint that is closest to Van Gent.

Van Gent	Latitude	Longitude	Diameter
D	16.3° N	161.7° E	35 km
N	13.5° N	160.0° E	32 km
P	12.6° N	159.4° E	47 km
T	15.5° N	157.2° E	16 km
U	17.0° N	157.1° E	20 km
X	16.4° N	159.7° E	38 km
