= Hutton (lunar crater) =

Crater on the Moon

- Coordinates: 37.3°N 168.7°E
- Diameter: 50 km
- Depth: Unknown
- Colongitude: 192° at sunrise
- Eponym: James Hutton

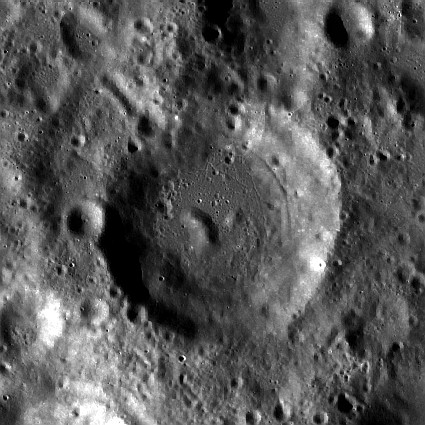

Hutton is a lunar impact crater on the far side of the Moon. It lies to the northwest of the larger crater Shayn, and to the north of Nušl.

Hutton is a worn, circular crater with a largely symmetrical appearance. Its features include a small craterlet across the western rim, some slight disruption to the northern rim, and an eroded, ledge-like form along the southern inner wall. The interior floor has an elongated central ridge at the midpoint, and a smaller ridge offset to the east, but it is otherwise marked only by tiny craterlets and a few small hills.

== Satellite craters ==
By convention, these features are identified on lunar maps by placing the letter on the side of the crater midpoint that is closest to Hutton.

Hutton	Latitude	Longitude	Diameter
P	35.7° N	167.4° E	42 km
W	39.1° N	166.7° E	23 km
