= Zernike (crater) =

Lunar impact crater

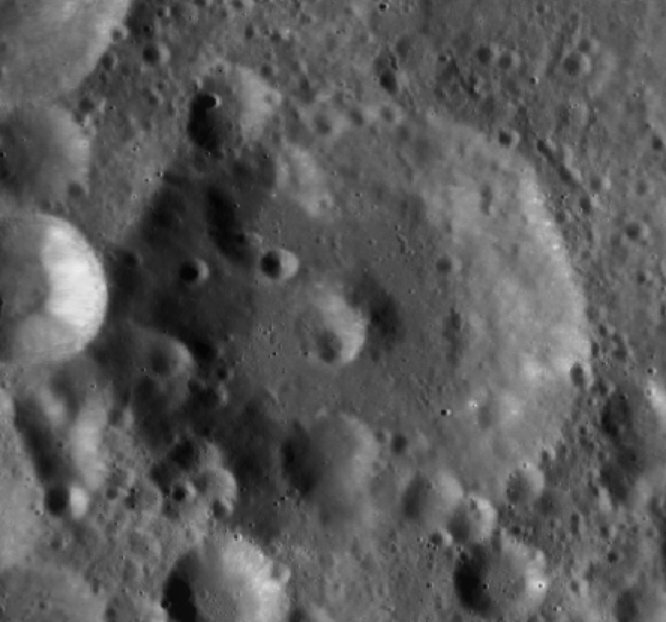
- LRO image
- Coordinates: 18.4°N 168.2°E
- Diameter: 48 km
- Depth: Unknown
- Colongitude: 192° at sunrise
- Eponym: Frits Zernike

Zernike is a lunar impact crater that is located on the far side of the Moon. The crater lies within the Freundlich-Sharonov Basin. It lies to the northwest of the larger crater Anderson.

Like many craters on the far side, this formation has been battered by impacts, and as a result it is worn and eroded, especially in the southern half. Several small craterlets overlie the rim, and lie within the rugged interior floor.

The crater is named after Frits Zernike, a Dutch physicist and winner of the 1953 Nobel Prize in Physics.

== Satellite craters ==
By convention these features are identified on lunar maps by placing the letter on the side of the crater midpoint that is closest to Zernike.

Zernike	Latitude	Longitude	Diameter
T	18.5° N	166.9° E	17 km
W	19.6° N	166.8° E	27 km
Z	20.9° N	168.0° E	30 km
