= Virtanen (crater) =

Crater on the Moon

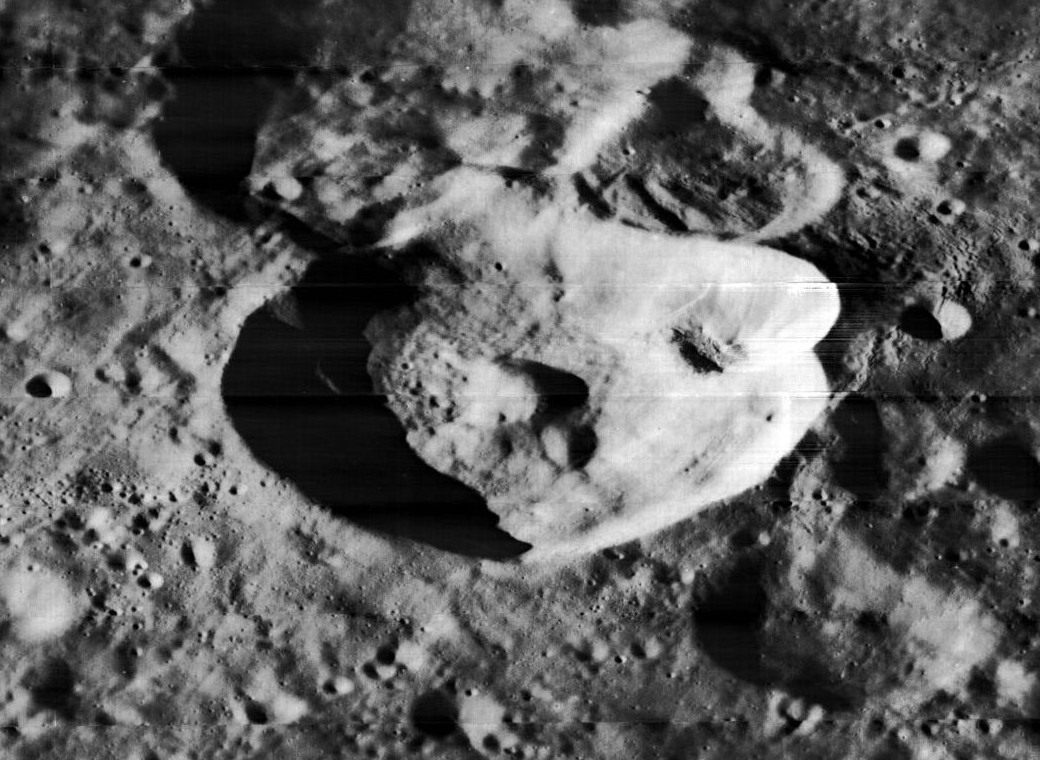
- Lunar Orbiter 2 image
- Coordinates: 15.64°N 176.74°E
- Diameter: 44 km
- Depth: Unknown
- Colongitude: 187° at sunrise
- Eponym: Artturi I. Virtanen

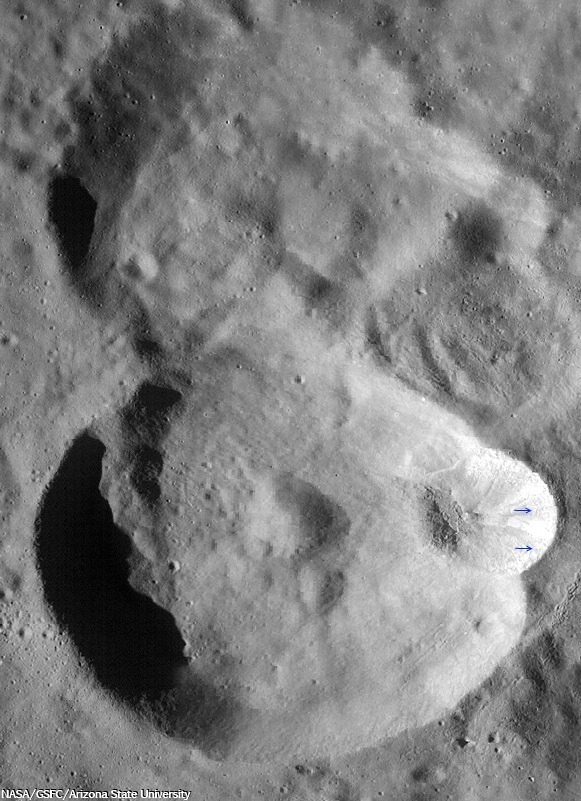
LRO WAC image

Virtanen is a lunar impact crater that lies within the Freundlich-Sharonov Basin. It is located to the northeast of the larger crater Sharonov, and to the east of Anderson. Virtanen lies on the far side of the Moon, and cannot be viewed directly from the Earth.

This crater has a nearly circular rim, with a relatively narrow inner wall and a central peak near the interior midpoint. The infrared spectrum of pure crystalline plagioclase has been identified within Virtanen. The large crater attached to the northern rim is Virtanen Z.

The small crater Virtanen F lying across the eastern rim is at the focus of a small ray system that covers much of Virtanen and its surroundings. The rays are wispy in nature and somewhat asymmetrical, with the distribution being much more expansive to the west. At the origin of the rays is a bright patch of higher-albedo surface.

== Satellite craters ==
By convention these features are identified on lunar maps by placing the letter on the side of the crater midpoint that is closest to Virtanen.

Virtanen	Coordinates	Diameter, km
B	17.83°N 177.9°E	27.3
C	17.28°N 178.2°E	19.7
F	15.79°N 177.32°E	11.6
J	14.03°N 178.06°E	19.9
Z	16.75°N 176.66°E	34.1
