= Šafařík (crater) =

Crater on the Moon

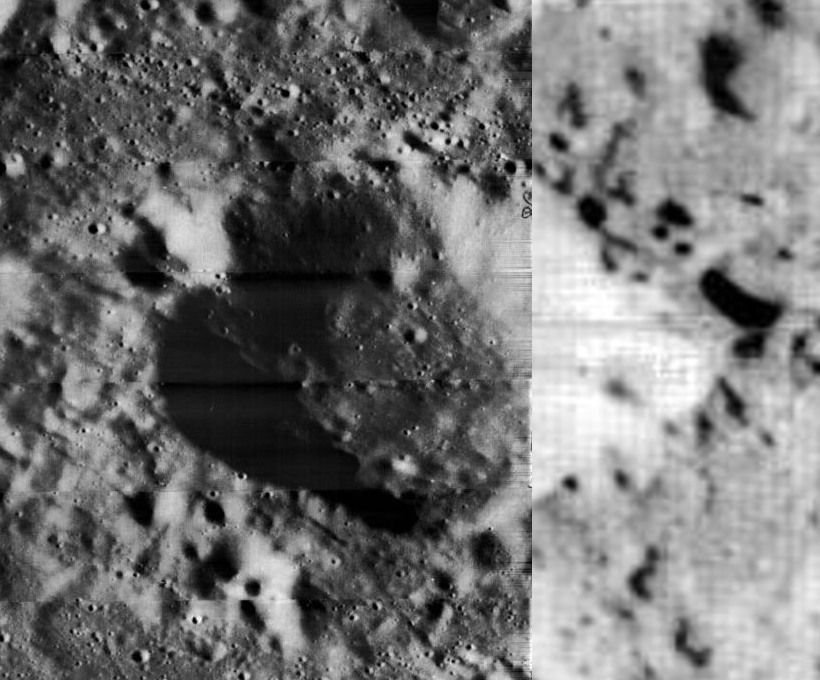
- Oblique Lunar Orbiter 2 image (mosaic of high and low resolution images)
- Coordinates: 10.6°N 176.9°E
- Diameter: 27 km
- Depth: Unknown
- Colongitude: 176° at sunrise
- Eponym: Vojtěch Šafařík

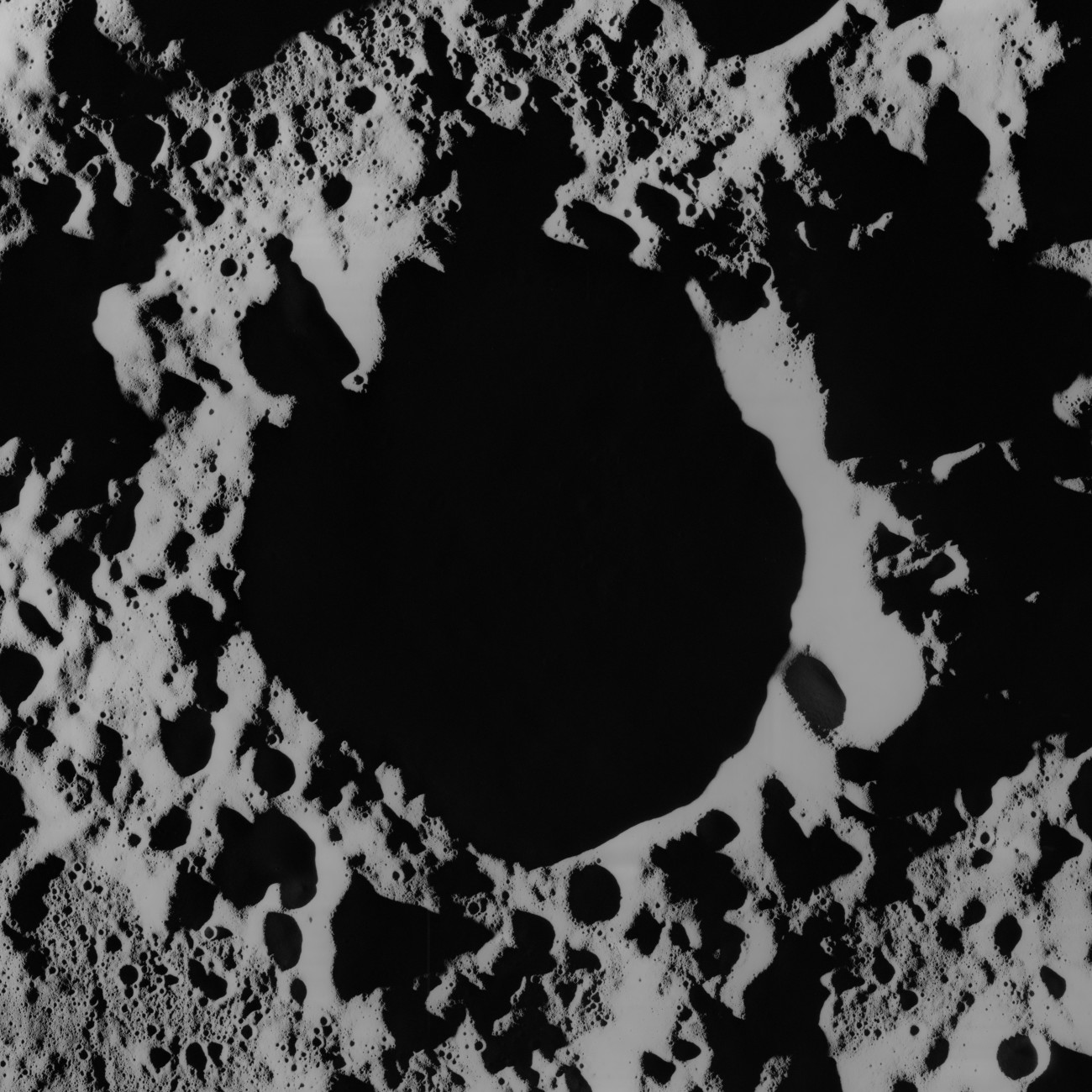
Apollo 16 image, when the crater was near the sunset terminator.

Šafařík is a small lunar impact crater on the far side of the Moon. It lies due north of the crater Tiselius and to the east-southeast of Sharonov. This is a worn and eroded crater with smaller impacts along the rim to the east and northwest. The remainder of the worn rim and the interior are relatively featureless.

The crater was named by the IAU in 1970.

The crater lies within the Freundlich-Sharonov Basin.

== Satellite craters ==
By convention these features are identified on lunar maps by placing the letter on the side of the crater midpoint that is closest to Šafařík.

Šafařík	Latitude	Longitude	Diameter
A	12.6° N	177.2° E	19 km
H	9.7° N	179.3° E	16 km
S	10.0° N	174.4° E	14 km
