= Buys-Ballot (crater) =

Crater on the Moon

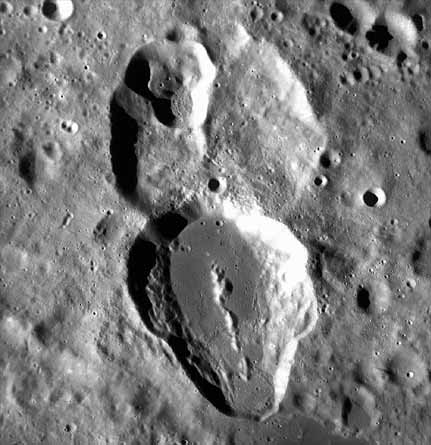
- LRO image showing the pear-shaped Buys-Ballot crater at bottom center, and dual satellite features Y and Z at top center
- Coordinates: 20.86°N 174.82°E
- Diameter: 66.38 km (41.25 mi)
- Depth: Unknown
- Colongitude: 186° at sunrise
- Formation: Imbrian or Nectarian
- Eponym: C. H. D. Buys Ballot

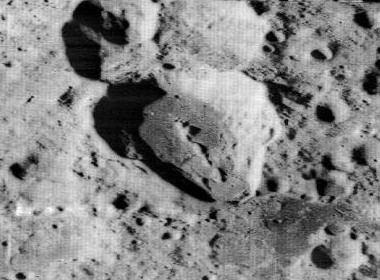
Lunar Orbiter 2 image

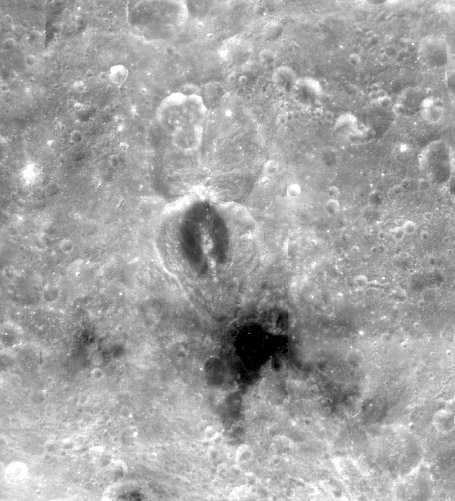
Clementine image of vicinity of Buys-Ballot. The dark region in the lower right is Lacus Luxuriae.

Buys-Ballot is an oddly-shaped lunar impact crater that is located on the far side of the Moon. This crater lies within the Freundlich-Sharonov Basin, to the north of center. Buys-Ballot lies just to the northwest of the small lunar mare named Lacus Luxuriae, and southeast of the crater Freundlich. Other nearby craters of note are Anderson to the southwest and Dante to the northeast.

This crater was named after Dutch meteorologist C. H. D. Buys Ballot (1817–1890). Its designation was formally adopted by the International Astronomical Union in 1970.

== Description ==
This formation has a distinctive shape for a crater, having a prominent extension to the south that nearly doubles the dimension compared to the width across the maximum west–east cross-section. It vaguely resembles a pear, with the thinner end to the south and the bulge to the north. The shape is likely the result of an oblique impact coming from the north. The larger end has a diameter of about 50 km, while the extension adds 20 km for a total area of 440 km^{2}. Despite the odd shape, this crater has not been significantly eroded and only a few tiny craterlets mark the interior or the rim.

Running down the middle of the crater along its longest dimension is a ridge that divides the southern part in half. This ridge extends as far north as the widest part before coming to an end. The floor at this widest part has been partially resurfaced by basaltic lava, leaving an oval area around the northern edge of the central ridge surrounded by a patch of material with a lower albedo than the surroundings. This basalt has an iron content estimated at 8–15 wt% and titanium content of around 0–2 wt%. The remainder of the interior floor is somewhat rough and irregular, particularly in the southern half.

Attached to the northern end of the crater is another odd formation consisting of the satellite craters Buys-Ballot Y and Z. These two nearly resemble mirror images of each other, being joined down the center by a narrow ridge line and extending nearly twice as far to the north as their individual widths in the east–west direction. The main difference between the two is that there is a concentric formation at the north end of the crater Y. The interior surfaces of both craters are irregular. The infrared spectrum of pure crystalline plagioclase has been identified on the northwest wall.

== Satellite craters ==
By convention these features are identified on lunar maps by placing the letter on the side of the crater midpoint that is closest to Buys-Ballot.

| Buys-Ballot | Latitude | Longitude | Diameter |
|---|---|---|---|
| H | 19.4° N | 179.5° E | 22 km |
| Q | 19.5° N | 172.7° E | 58 km |
| Y | 22.9° N | 174.0° E | 31 km |
| Z | 22.5° N | 174.5° E | 58 km |
