= Larmor (crater) =

Crater on the Moon

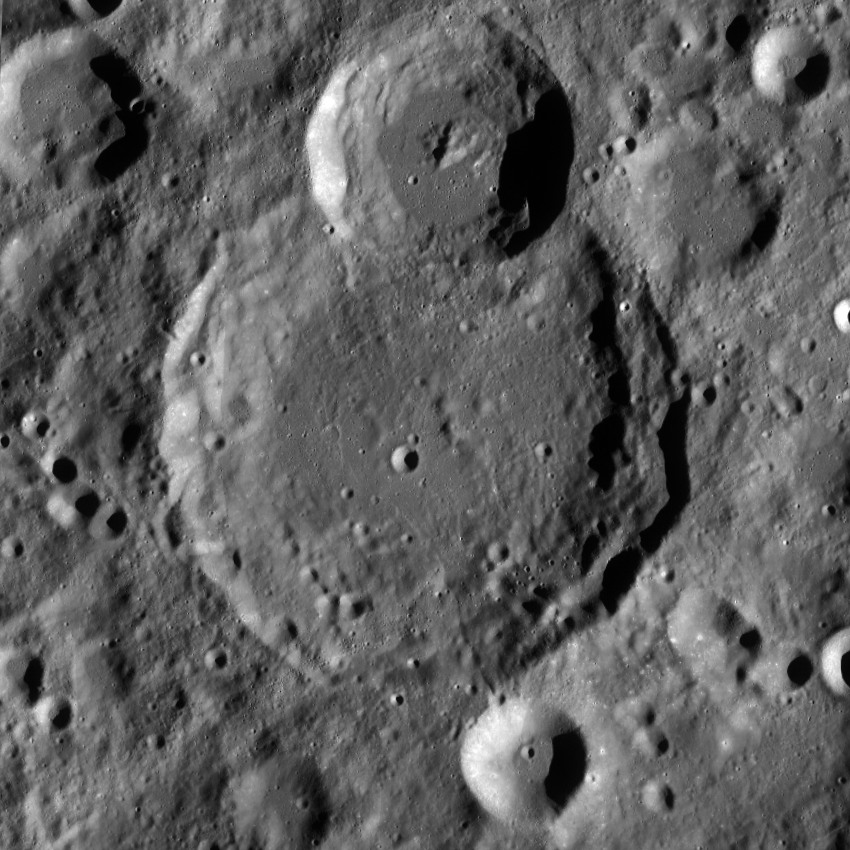
- LRO image, with Larmor Z at top
- Coordinates: 32.1°N 179.7°E
- Diameter: 97 km (60 mi)
- Depth: Unknown
- Colongitude: 180° at sunrise
- Eponym: Joseph Larmor

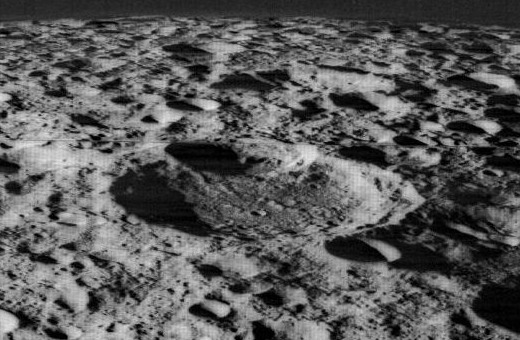
Oblique Lunar Orbiter 2 image, facing north

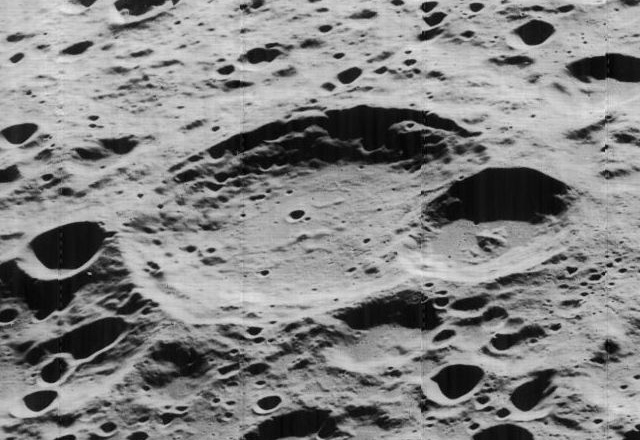
Oblique Lunar Orbiter 5 image, facing west

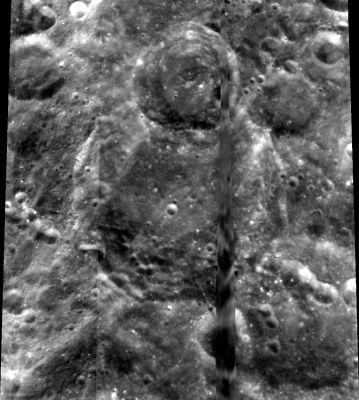
Clementine mosaic

Larmor is a crater on the Moon's far side. It is located to the east-southeast of Shayn and due north of Dante. It is named in honor of the physicist Joseph Larmor.

The rim of Larmor is broken across by the satellite crater Larmor Z. The remaining rim is slightly worn, particularly to the southwest, and the inner wall is somewhat wider at the southern end. The wider southern inner wall displays terrace structures. Near the midpoint of the otherwise relatively level interior floor are some low hill features.

The satellite crater Larmor Q, located about one and a half crater diameters to the southwest of Larmor, has a ray system. These rays lie primarily within cones to the north and southeast, which leave a 120° arc to the west which is free of ray material. The crater is fresh, with an impact melt splash pool at the bottom and lobes of melt that have flowed down the outside of the rim.

The crater was named after Joseph Larmor by the IAU in 1970.

== Satellite craters ==
By convention these features are identified on lunar maps by placing the letter on the side of the crater midpoint that is closest to Larmor.

Larmor	Latitude	Longitude	Diameter
K	30.3° N	179.0° W	24 km (15 mi)
Q	28.6° N	176.2° E	22 km (14 mi)
W	33.3° N	177.6° E	27 km (17 mi)
Z	33.7° N	179.8° W	49 km (30 mi)

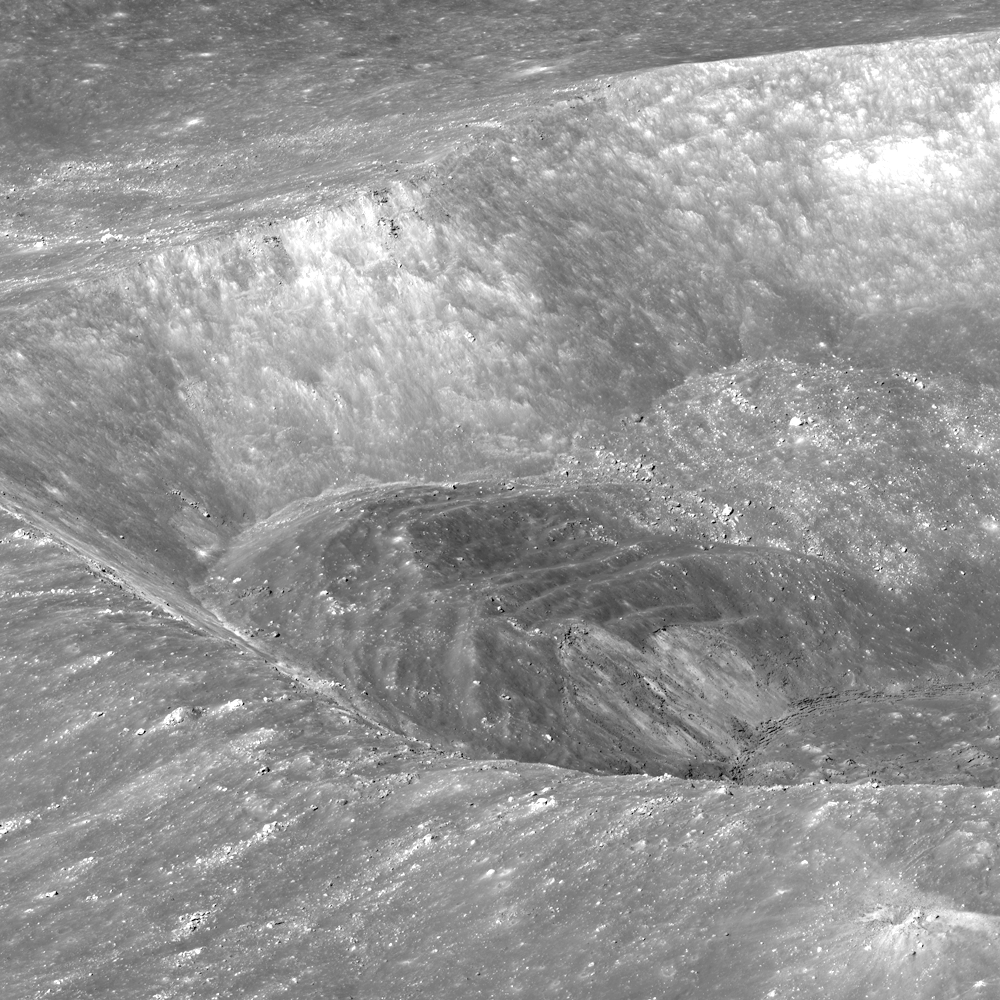
Oblique view of part of Larmor Q crater
