= Champollion (crater) =

Crater on the Moon

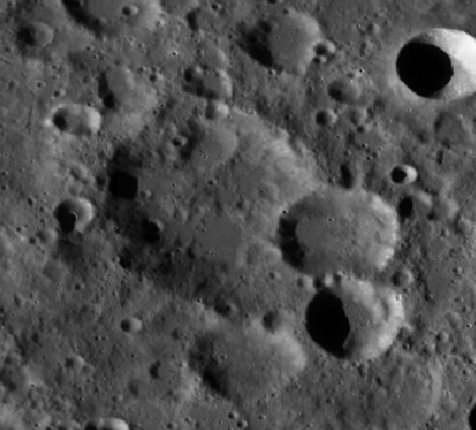
- LRO image
- Coordinates: 37.4°N 175.2°E
- Diameter: 48.97 km (30.43 mi)
- Depth: Unknown
- Colongitude: 186° at sunrise
- Eponym: Jean F. Champollion

Champollion is a lunar impact crater that lies on the far side of the Moon. It is located north-northeast of the larger crater Shayn, and south-southeast of Chandler.

This degraded crater formation has been heavily damaged by subsequent impacts, and is now a battered depression in the surface. An unnamed crater overlays the eastern rim, and the remaining inner wall is incised along much of its circumference by lesser impacts. One of these forms a trough in the northern inner wall, with side walls that extend almost to the center of the floor.

This formation was named after French Eygyptologist Jean F. Champollion (1790–1832). Its designation was formally adopted by the International Astronomical Union in 1970.

== Satellite craters ==
By convention these features are identified on lunar maps by placing the letter on the side of the crater midpoint that is closest to Champollion.

Champollion	Latitude	Longitude	Diameter
A	41.1° N	177.1° E	27 km
F	37.3° N	177.8° E	21 km
K	36.5° N	176.4° E	22 km
Y	40.8° N	174.7° E	22 km
