= Konstantin Konstantinov =

Russian military officer (1818–1871)

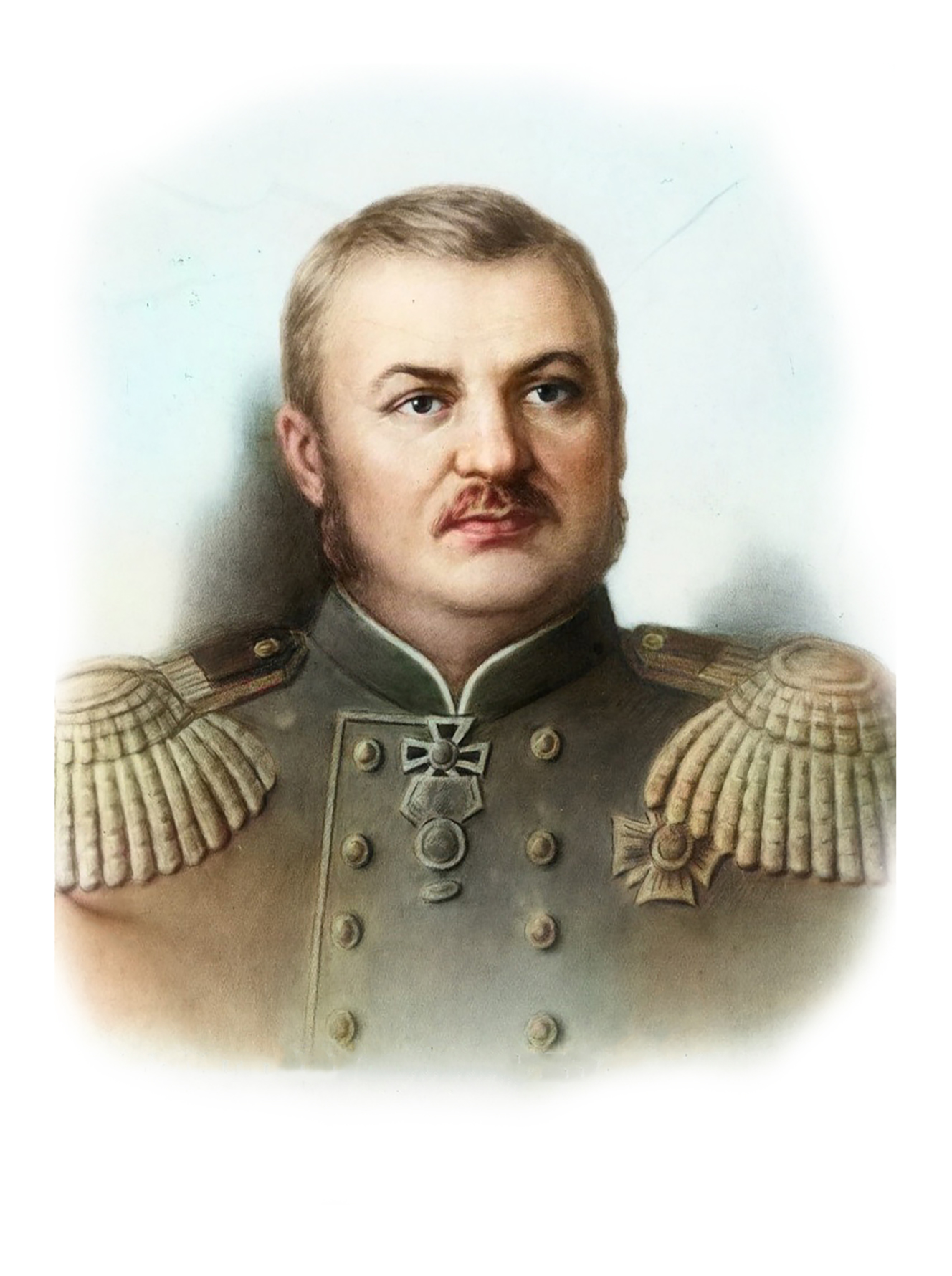
Konstantin Ivanovich Konstantinov

Konstantin Ivanovich Konstantinov (Russian: Константин Иванович Константинов; 6 Аpril 1818 Warsaw, Congress Poland – 12 January 1871 Nikolaev, Russian Empire) was a Russian military officer and scientist in the fields of artillery, rocketry and instrument making. He completed his military career at the rank of Lieutenant General.

== Life ==
He was an illegitimate son of Grand Duke Constantine Pavlovich of Russia and the French actress Clara-Anna de Laurens. At birth, the boy was named Konstantin Konstantinovich Konstantinov.

His father was childless in two marriages, so he spent considerable funds on the upbringing and education of his illegitimate children. For example, music lessons for Konstantin and his sister Constance were given by the young Frédéric Chopin, who was often invited for this purpose to Belvedere, the summer Warsaw residence of the Grand Duke.

Constantine Pavlovich's family circumstances were such that his children, Constance and Konstantin, were considered wards (adopted children) of Prince Ivan Alexandrovich Golitsyn, the Grand Duke's adjutant. It was for this reason that their patronymics were subsequently changed.

In 1831, during the Polish uprising, Constantine Pavlovich left Poland for Russia, but fell ill with cholera on the way and died in Vitebsk. Prince Golitsyn, together with the 13-year-old Konstantin and his mother Clara-Anne de Laurens, settled in St. Petersburg.

In January 1834, fulfilling the will of the late Constantine Pavlovich, Prince Golitsyn assigned the 15-year-old Konstantin to the prestigious Mikhailovskoye Artillery School as a cadet.

Konstantinov graduated from Mikhailovskoye Artillery School in St.Petersburg in 1836.

In 1844, he invented a device for measuring the flight speed of projectiles at any point of their trajectory.

In 1847, Konstantinov created a ballistic rocket pendulum, which would allow to establish a law of changing rocket motion in time. With the help of this device, he was able to determine the influence of the form and design of a rocket on its ballistic characteristics, thereby laying the foundations for calculated rocket designs.

In 1849, he was appointed commander of the Petersburg Rocketry Department (Петербургское ракетное заведение).

In 1861, he supervised the construction of a rocket factory in Nikolayev, which he would head six years later.

Konstantinov is known to have created structurally perfect missiles (for the 19th century) with a range of 4 to 5 km, launch pads, and rocket-making machines. He authored a number of works on rocket science, artillery, firearms, pyrotechnics, and aeronautics.

A crater on the far side of the Moon is named after him.

== See also ==
- List of Russian inventors
