= Papaleksi (crater) =

Crater on the Moon

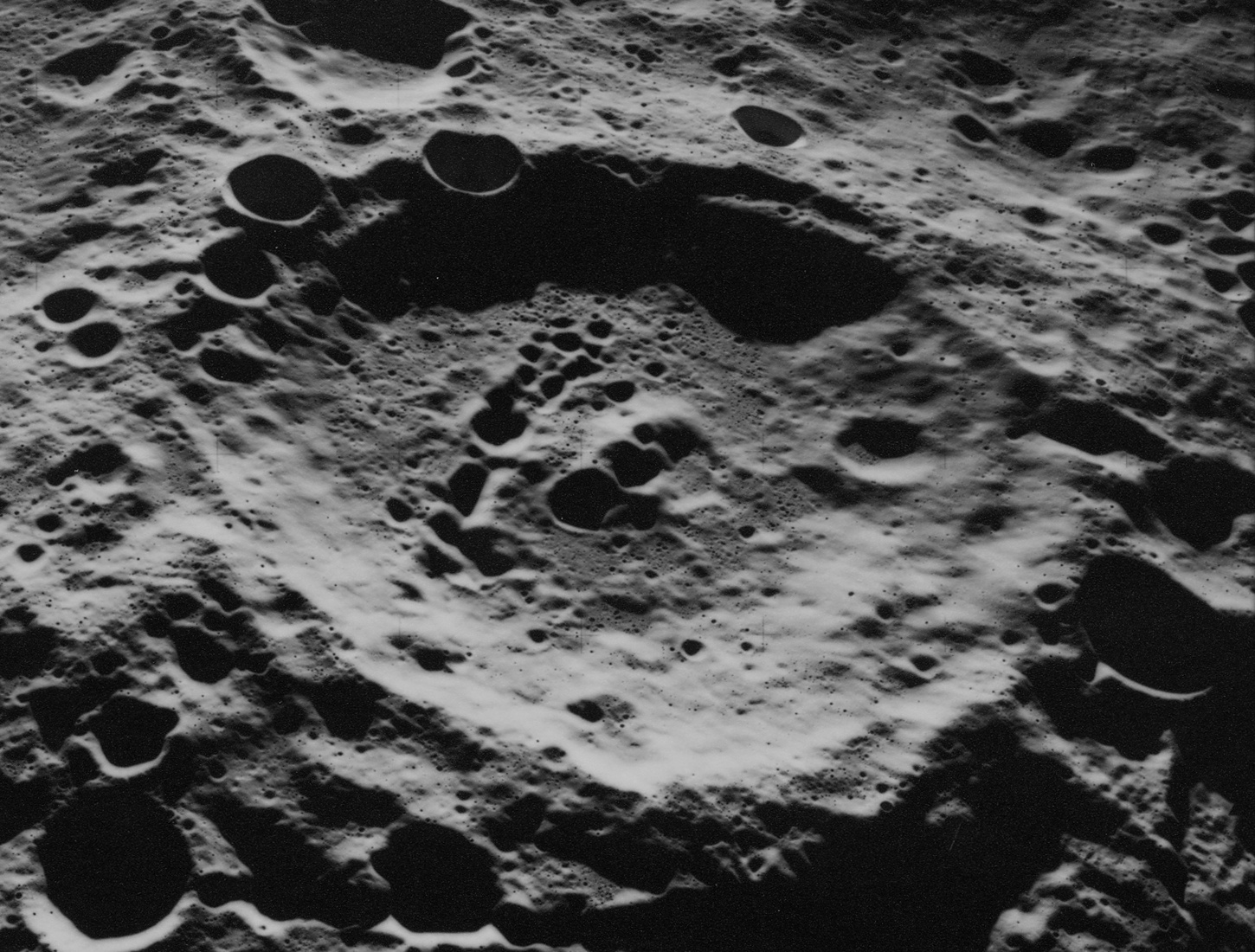
- Oblique Apollo 16 image, facing west
- Coordinates: 10.2°N 164.0°E
- Diameter: 97 km
- Depth: Unknown
- Colongitude: 197° at sunrise
- Eponym: Nikolaj D. Papaleksi

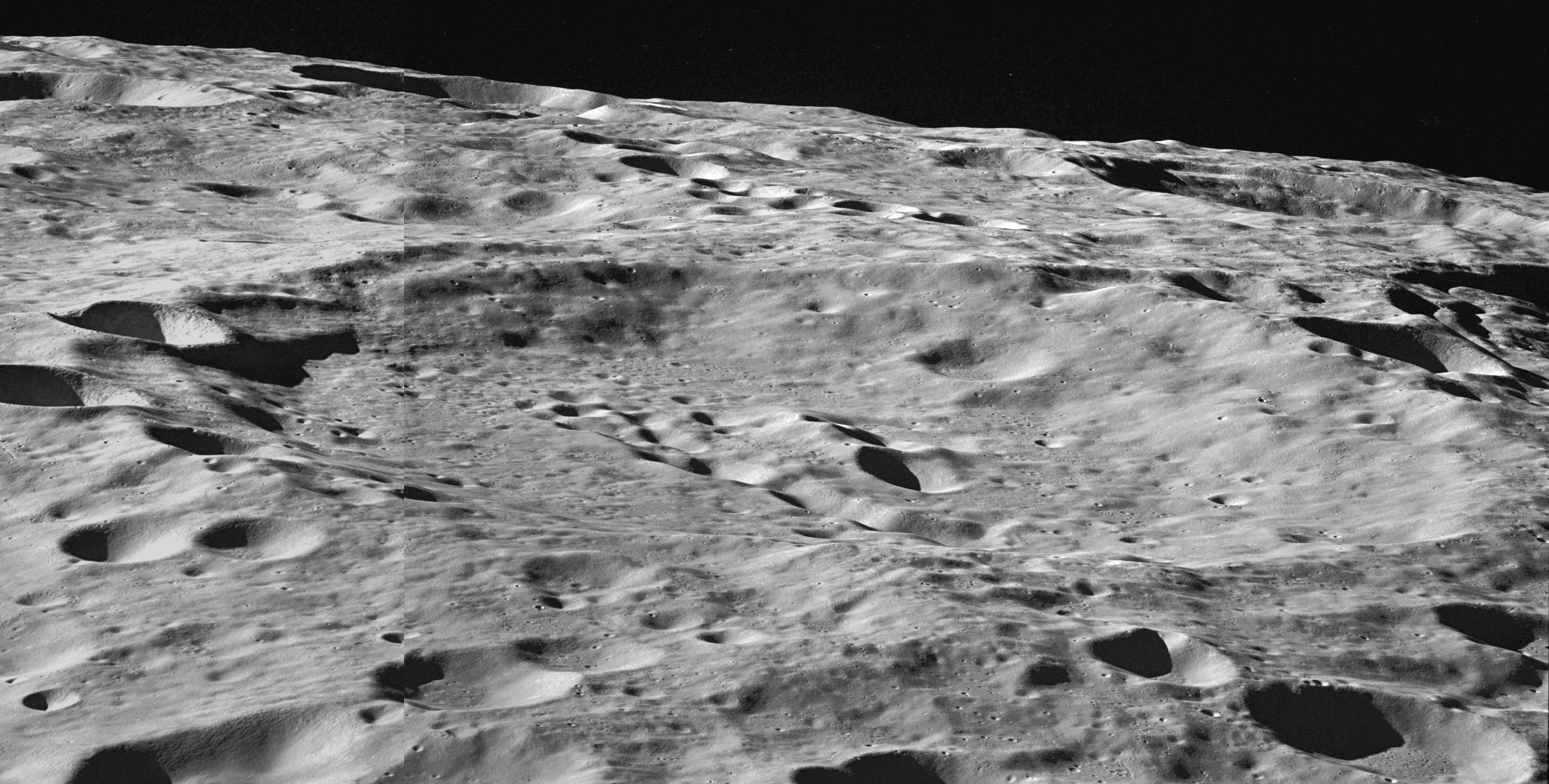
Oblique view from Apollo 10

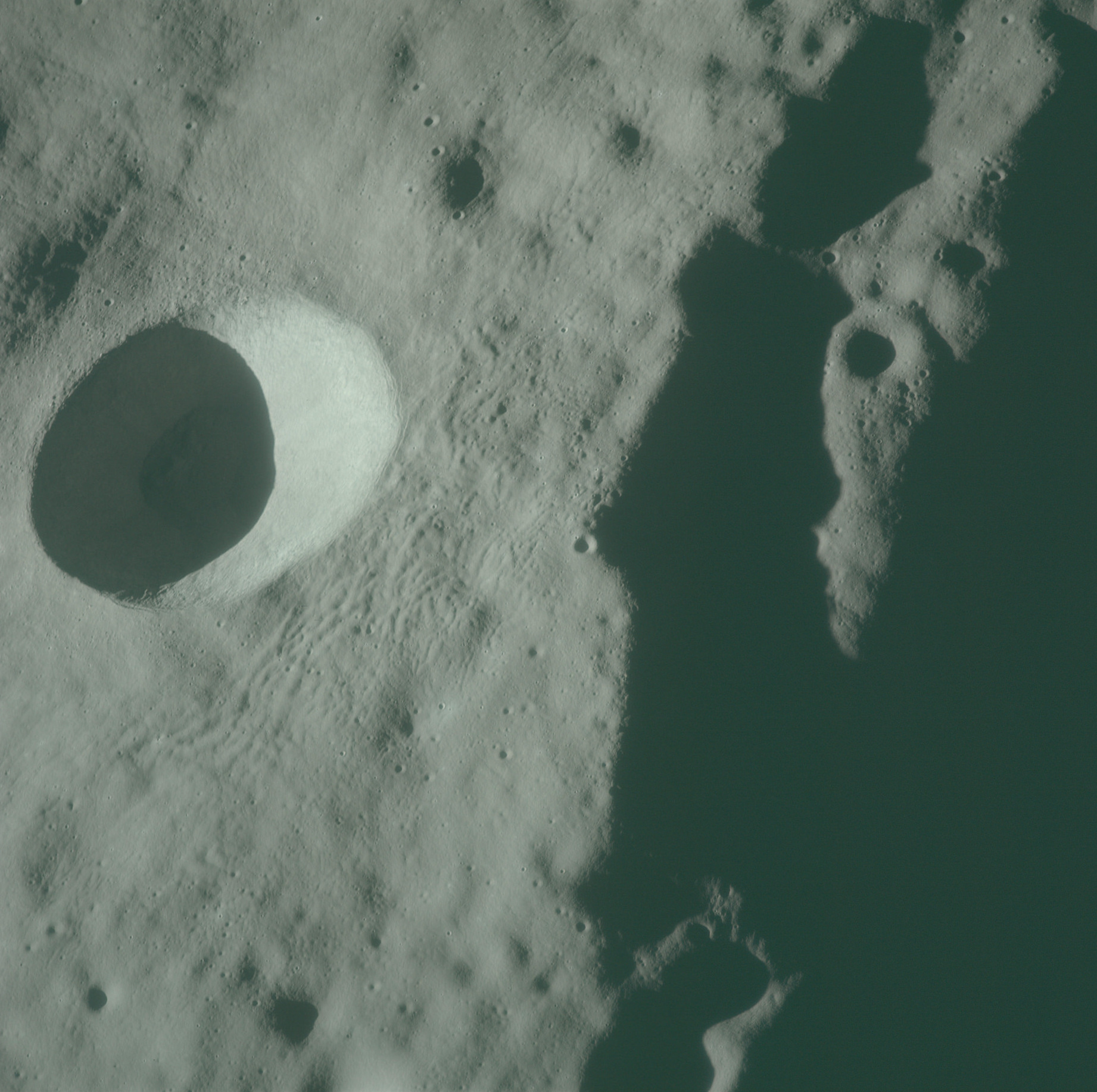
Oblique view of small, unnamed crater with dune-like ejecta, near the northwest rim of Papaleksi, from Apollo 16

Papaleksi is an impact crater on the far side of the Moon. It lies along the northeastern outskirts of the large crater Mandel'shtam. About 20 km to the north-northeast of Papaleksi is the similar crater Spencer Jones.

This is a roughly circular crater with an eroded outer rim that has lost much of its original sharp definition. Much of the original structure of the rim and inner walls have been worn down, but only three small craters lie along the rim edge to the southwest. There is a central ridge near the midpoint with an impact at the east end, and a linear arrangement of small impacts to the south of this ridge. A small crater lies along the edge of the northern inner wall.

Prior to formal naming by the IAU in 1970, Papaleksi was called Crater 221. It was named after Nikolai Papaleksi who worked closely with Leonid Mandelstam.

== Satellite craters ==
By convention these features are identified on lunar maps by placing the letter on the side of the crater midpoint that is closest to Papaleksi.

Papaleksi	Latitude	Longitude	Diameter
Q	9.0° N	162.7° E	14 km
