= Nagaoka (crater) =

Crater on the Moon

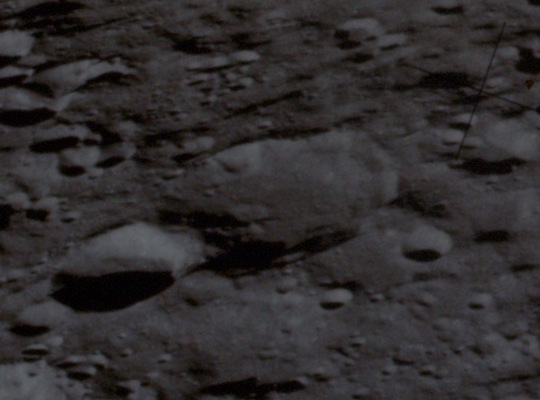
- Oblique Apollo 13 image, facing east
- Coordinates: 19.4°N 154.0°E
- Diameter: 46 km
- Depth: Unknown
- Colongitude: 206° at sunrise
- Eponym: Hantaro Nagaoka

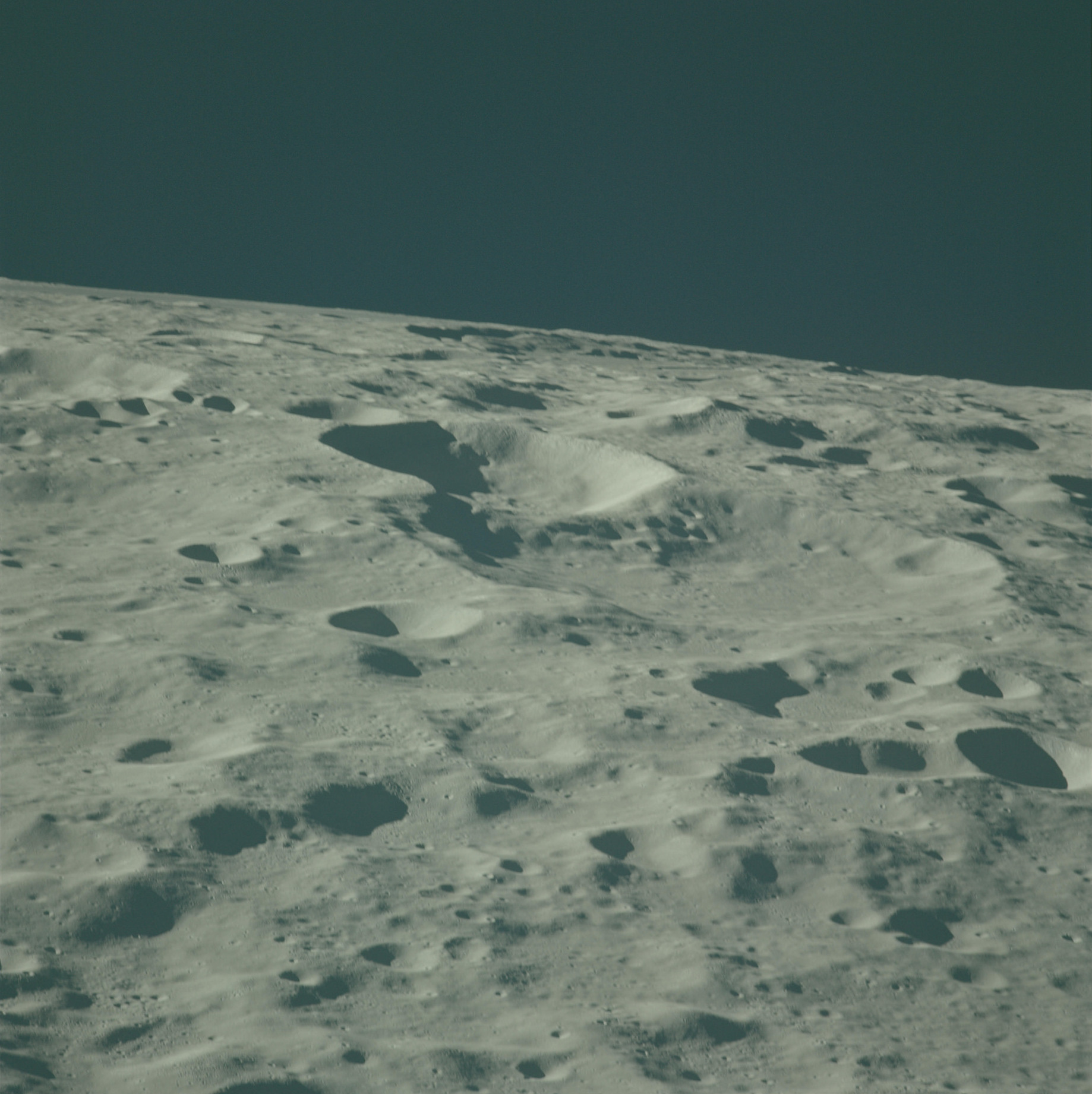
Oblique Apollo 16 image, facing north

Nagaoka is a lunar impact crater that lies to the southeast of the Mare Moscoviense, on the far side of the Moon. To the east of Nagaoka is the somewhat larger Konstantinov.

This is a moderately eroded crater, with the satellite crater Nagaoka W overlapping the northwestern rim. The remainder of the rim remains well-defined, although it is overlain by several tiny craters. The inner wall has slumped in places, forming terrace-like shelves. A few small craters lie within the crater interior.

The crater was named after Japanese physicist Hantaro Nagaoka by the IAU in 1970.

== Satellite craters ==
By convention these features are identified on lunar maps by placing the letter on the side of the crater midpoint that is closest to Nagaoka.

Nagaoka	Latitude	Longitude	Diameter
U	19.9° N	151.4° E	30 km
W	20.0° N	153.0° E	29 km
