= Konstantinov (crater) =

Crater on the Moon

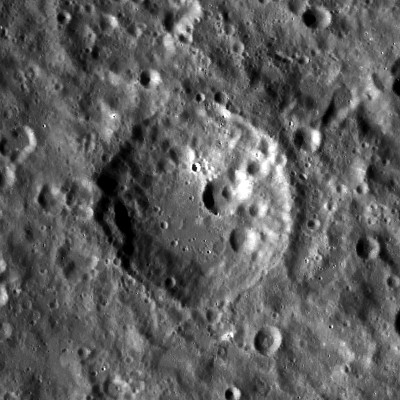
- LRO WAC image
- Coordinates: 19.8°N 158.4°E
- Diameter: 66 km
- Depth: Unknown
- Colongitude: 202° at sunrise
- Eponym: Konstantin I. Konstantinov

Konstantinov is a lunar impact crater that is located to the southeast of the Mare Moscoviense, on the far side of the Moon. To the west of Konstantinov is the smaller crater Nagaoka, and to the south-southeast is the small Van Gent.

This is a moderately worn crater, particularly along the northeastern quadrant where multiple small craterlets lie along the inner wall. There is a pair of small craters on the interior floor along the eastern edge. At the northern end of the floor is a bright patch, most likely due to a recent impact.

The crater was named by the IAU in 1970.

== Apollo Views ==
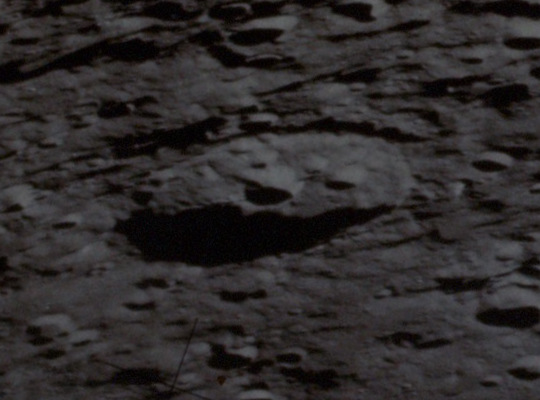
Oblique Apollo 13 image, facing east

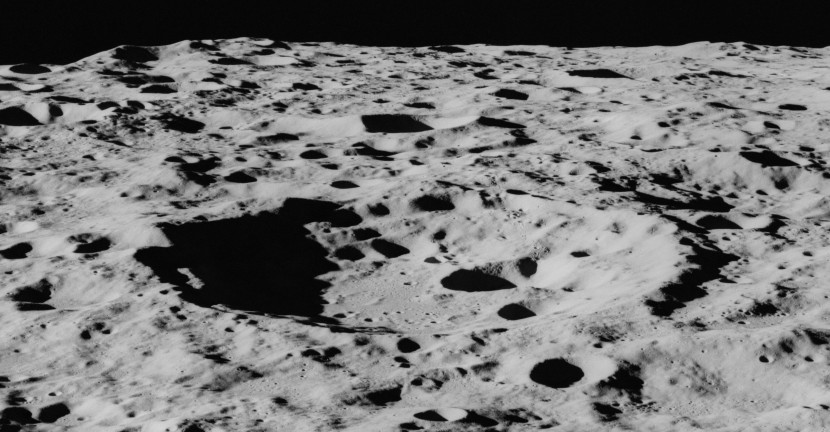
Oblique Apollo 16 image, facing north

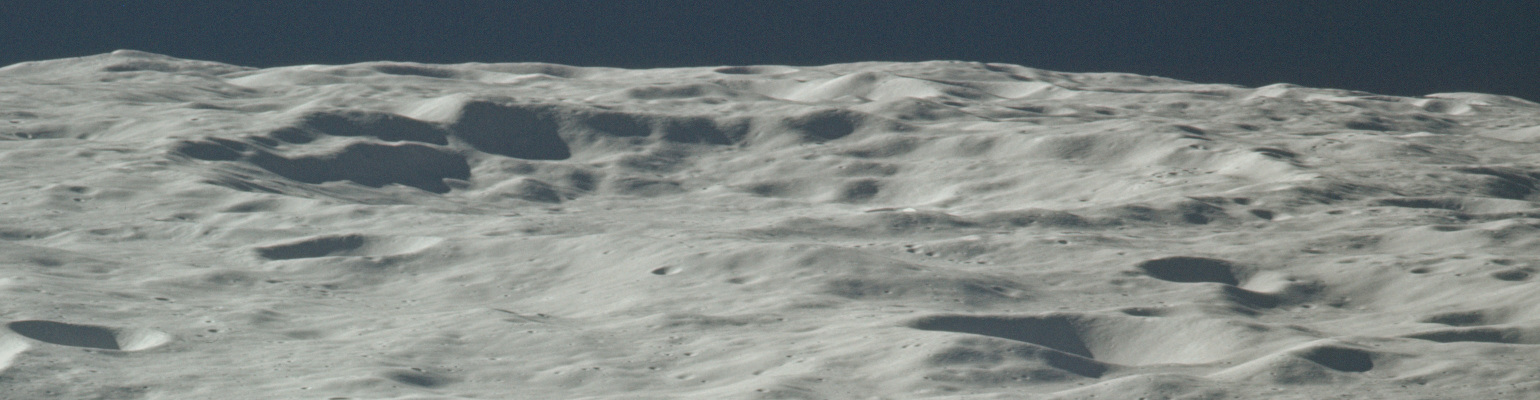
Highly oblique Apollo 16 image, facing northeast
