= Morse (crater) =

Crater on the Moon

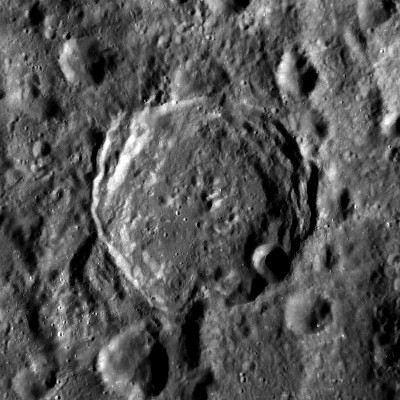
- LRO image
- Coordinates: 22.1°N 175.1°W
- Diameter: 77 km
- Depth: Unknown
- Colongitude: 176° at sunrise
- Eponym: Samuel F. B. Morse

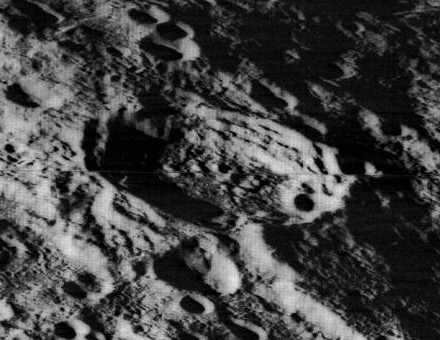
Oblique Lunar Orbiter 2 image

Morse is a lunar impact crater that is located on the far side of the Moon and cannot be seen directly from the Earth. The crater lies at the northeast margin of the Freundlich-Sharonov Basin. It lies about one crater diameter to the southwest of the larger Fitzgerald. To the west-northwest of Morse is Dante.

This formation dates to the Eratosthenian epoch of the lunar geologic timescale. It is a relatively well-defined crater with features that have not been markedly eroded by subsequent impacts. There is a small crater along the southeastern rim, however, and the southern rim is somewhat disrupted. The rim edge is uneven in places and there are terrace features along the inner walls to the northeast and west. The interior floor, while generally level, has a number of low irregularities forming small hills. The infrared spectrum of pure crystalline plagioclase has been identified on the central peak.

== Satellite craters ==
By convention these features are identified on lunar maps by placing the letter on the side of the crater midpoint that is closest to Morse.

Morse	Latitude	Longitude	Diameter
N	20.2° N	176.1° W	25 km
T	22.0° N	179.5° W	34 km
