= Erwin Finlay-Freundlich =

German astronomer

Erwin Finlay-Freundlich FRSE FRAS
- Born: 29 May 1885; Biebrich, Hesse, Germany
- Died: 24 July 1964 (aged 79); Wiesbaden, Hesse, Germany
- Education: Charlottenburg Polytechnic; University of Göttingen
- Spouse: Kate Hirschberg (m. 1913)
- Scientific career
- Fields: Astronomy
- Workplaces: Berlin Observatory; Einstein Tower; University of Istanbul; Charles University of Prague; St. Andrews University; University of Mainz
- Thesis: Analytische Funktionen mit beliebig vorgeschriebenem unendlich-blättrigem Existenzbereiche (1910)
- Doctoral advisor: C. Felix Klein; Paul Koebe

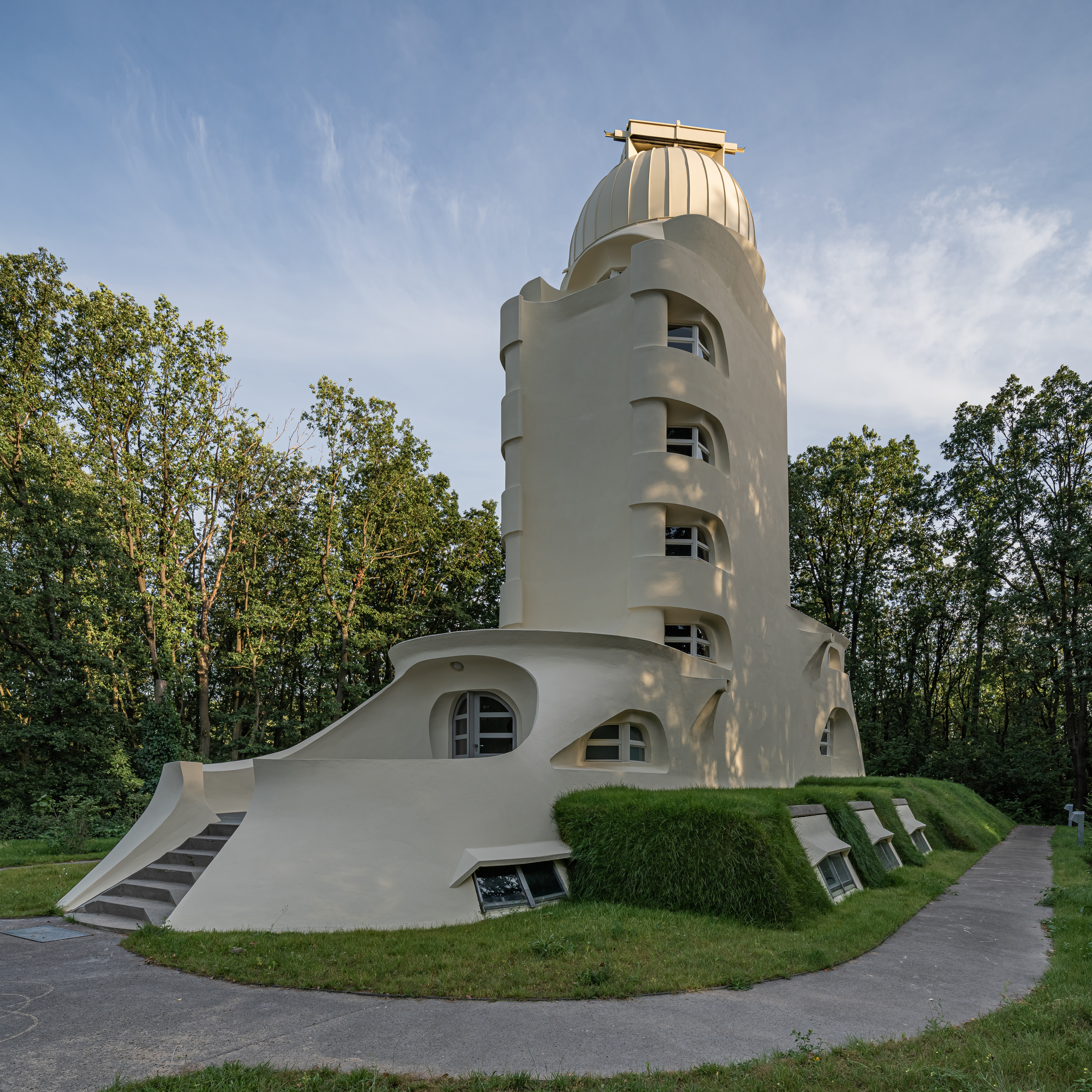
Einstein Tower in Potsdam

Erwin Finlay-Freundlich FRSE FRAS (German: [ˈfʀɔɪntlɪç]; 29 May 1885 – 24 July 1964) was a German astronomer, a pupil of Felix Klein. Freundlich was a working associate of Albert Einstein and introduced experiments for which the general theory of relativity could be tested by astronomical observations based on the gravitational redshift.

== Life ==
He was born in Biebrich, Germany the son of Friedrich Philipp Ernst Freundlich, a manufacturer, and his wife Elizabeth (Ellie) Finlayson. He was one of seven children, all of whom were raised Protestant, despite their father's Jewish heritage. His elder brother was Herbert Max Finlay Freundlich. He studied locally, leaving school in 1903. He spent 6 months working in the shipyards of Stettin which inspired him to begin studying shipbuilding at the Charlottenburg Polytechnic in Berlin. However he abandoned this in autumn 1905 to instead study Mathematics and Astronomy at Göttingen. Here he studied under Felix Klein and Karl Schwarzschild.

In 1913 he married Kate Hirschberg. After finishing his thesis under the direction of Paul Koebe at the University of Göttingen in 1910 and gaining his doctorate (PhD), he became assistant at the Berlin Observatory, where he became associated with Albert Einstein. During an expedition to verify general relativity during a solar eclipse in 1914, World War I broke out and he was interned in Russia, for a few days, before being freed in an exchanging of prisoners. The expedition failed. After the war, he was engaged in the construction of a solar observatory in Potsdam, the Einsteinturm, and he was director of the Einstein-Institut. In 1933 Hitler came to power and Freundlich was forced to leave Germany; he had a Jewish grandmother and his wife was Jewish. He was appointed professor at the University of Istanbul, which was reformed by Kemal Atatürk with the help of many German scholars. In 1937 he left Istanbul to take up the post of professor of astronomy at the Charles University of Prague, but this appointment was terminated by the German occupation in 1938.

On the recommendation of Arthur Stanley Eddington he went to St. Andrews University in Scotland, where he lectured in astronomy from 1939. In 1941 he was elected a Fellow of the Royal Society of Edinburgh. His proposers were William Greaves, Alexander Aitken, Max Born and Robert Schlapp.

In 1951 he was created John Napier Professor of Astronomy. On his retirement in 1959, he returned to his native town Wiesbaden and was appointed professor at the University of Mainz. Freundlich died in Wiesbaden, Germany on 24 July 1964.

The Freundlich crater on the moon is named after him.

== Achievements ==
Freundlich researched the deflection of light rays passing close to the Sun. He proposed an experiment, during an eclipse, to verify the validity of Einstein's theory of general relativity. Freundlich's demonstration would have proven Newton's theories incorrect. He did conduct inconclusive tests on the prediction by Einstein's theory of gravitation-induced red shift of spectral lines in the Sun, using the solar observatories he had constructed in Potsdam and Istanbul. In 1953, he proposed with Max Born an alternative explanation of the red shifts observed in galaxies by a tired light model.

== Publications ==
- Die Grundlagen der Einsteinschen Gravitationstheorie. Mit e. Vorw. von Albert Einstein. – Berlin : Springer, 1916. – 64 S.; 8
- Über die Rotverschiebung der Spektrallinien with Max Born (1953)
- Theoretische Bemerkungen zu Freundlichs Formel für die stellare Rotverschiebung (1953)
- Cosmology (1971)

== External links and resources ==
- Klaus Hentschel: The Einstein Tower An Intertexture of Dynamic Construction, Relativity Theory, and Astronomy, Stanford University Press, Stanford 1997.
- School of Mathematics and Statistics. "Erwin Finlay Freundlich". University of St Andrews, Scotland.
- Erwin Freundlich at the Mathematics Genealogy Project
