= Freundlich-Sharonov Basin =

Crater on the Moon

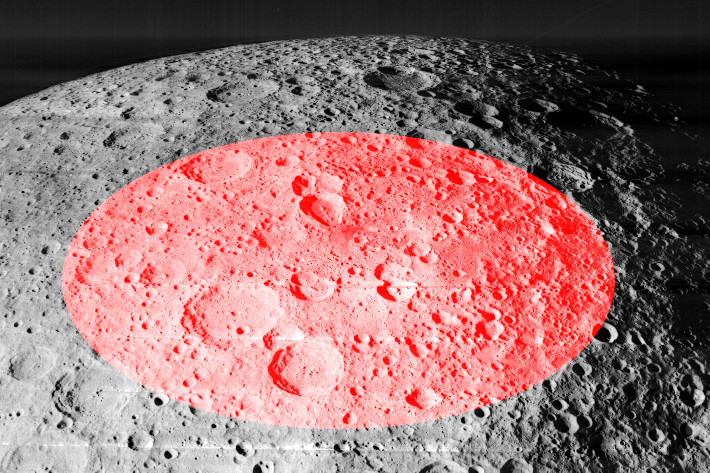
- Oblique Lunar Orbiter 2 image with the approximate extent of the basin highlighted in red
- Coordinates: 19.0°N 176.0°E
- Diameter: 600 km
- Eponym: Freundlich and Sharonov craters

The Freundlich-Sharonov Basin is a Pre-Nectarian impact basin on the far side of the Moon. It is named after the younger craters Freundlich near the northwest margin and Sharonov near the southwest margin. It lies east of Mare Moscoviense basin and northwest of Korolev basin.

The basin is not obvious on lunar photographs, although it was discovered from analysis of Lunar Orbiter photographs. At the center is the small mare Lacus Luxuriae, just south of the oblique crater Buys-Ballot.

Also at the center is a mass concentration (mascon), or gravitational high. The mascon was first identified by Doppler tracking of the Lunar Prospector spacecraft.

Other craters within the basin include Anderson, Virtanen, Zernike, Dante, and the smaller Šafařík. Morse and Spencer Jones are at the margins.

== Views ==
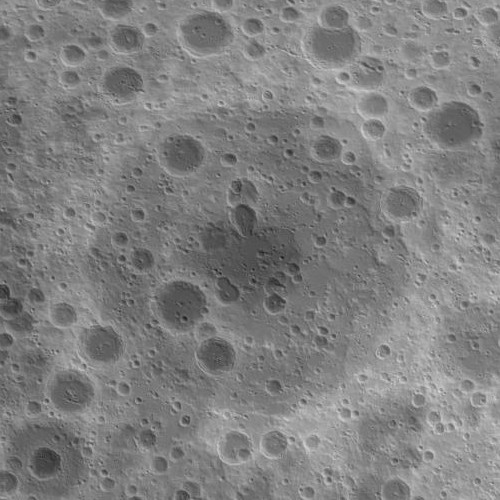
Topographic map

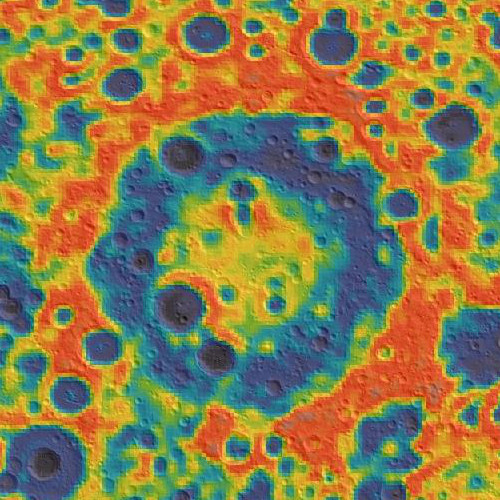
Gravity map based on GRAIL

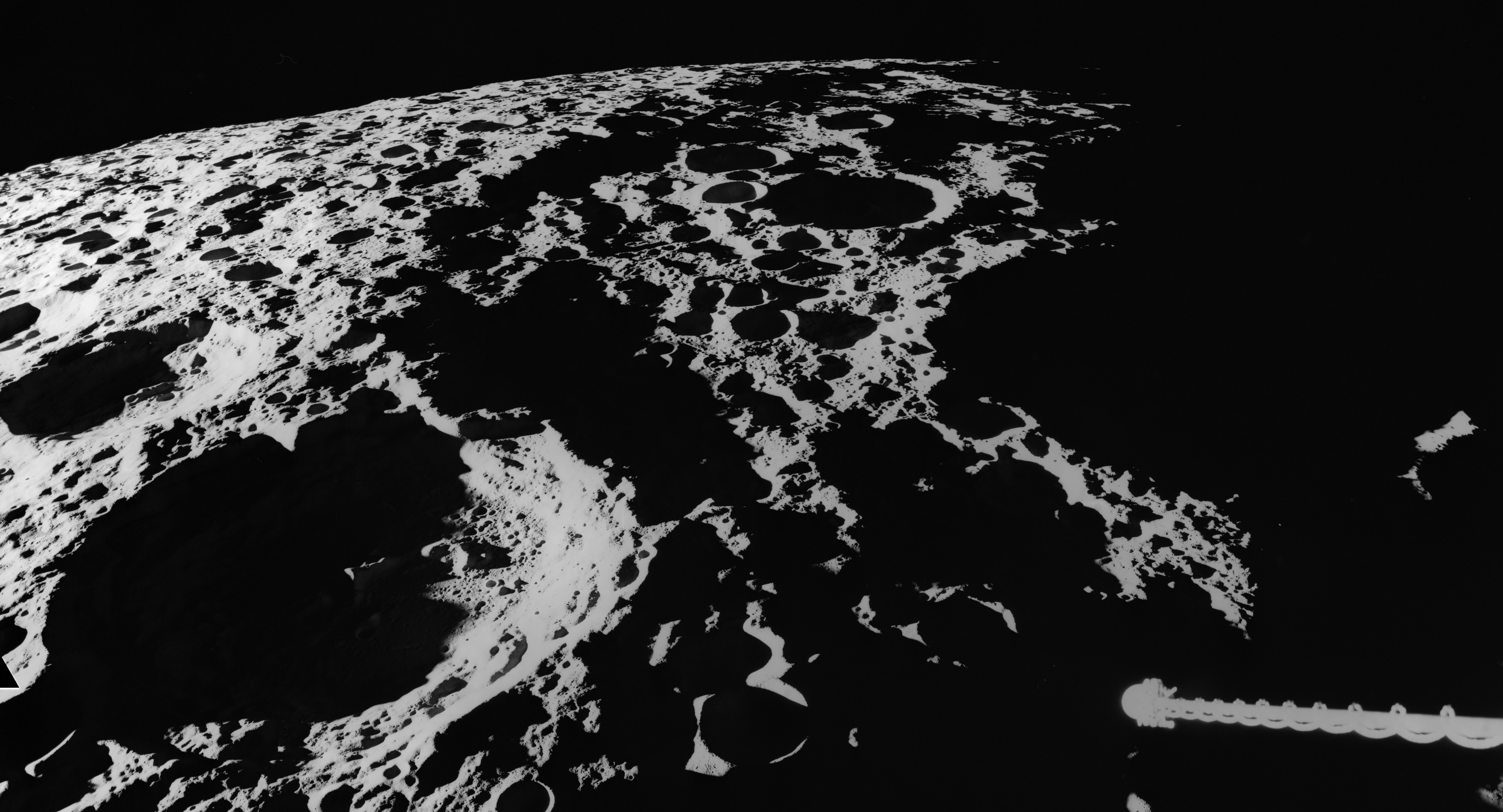
View of the west rim of the basin while at the sunset terminator during the Apollo 16 mission. Spencer Jones is in the lower left, and the spacecraft's gamma-ray spectrometer is in lower right.
