= FitzGerald (crater) =

Crater on the Moon

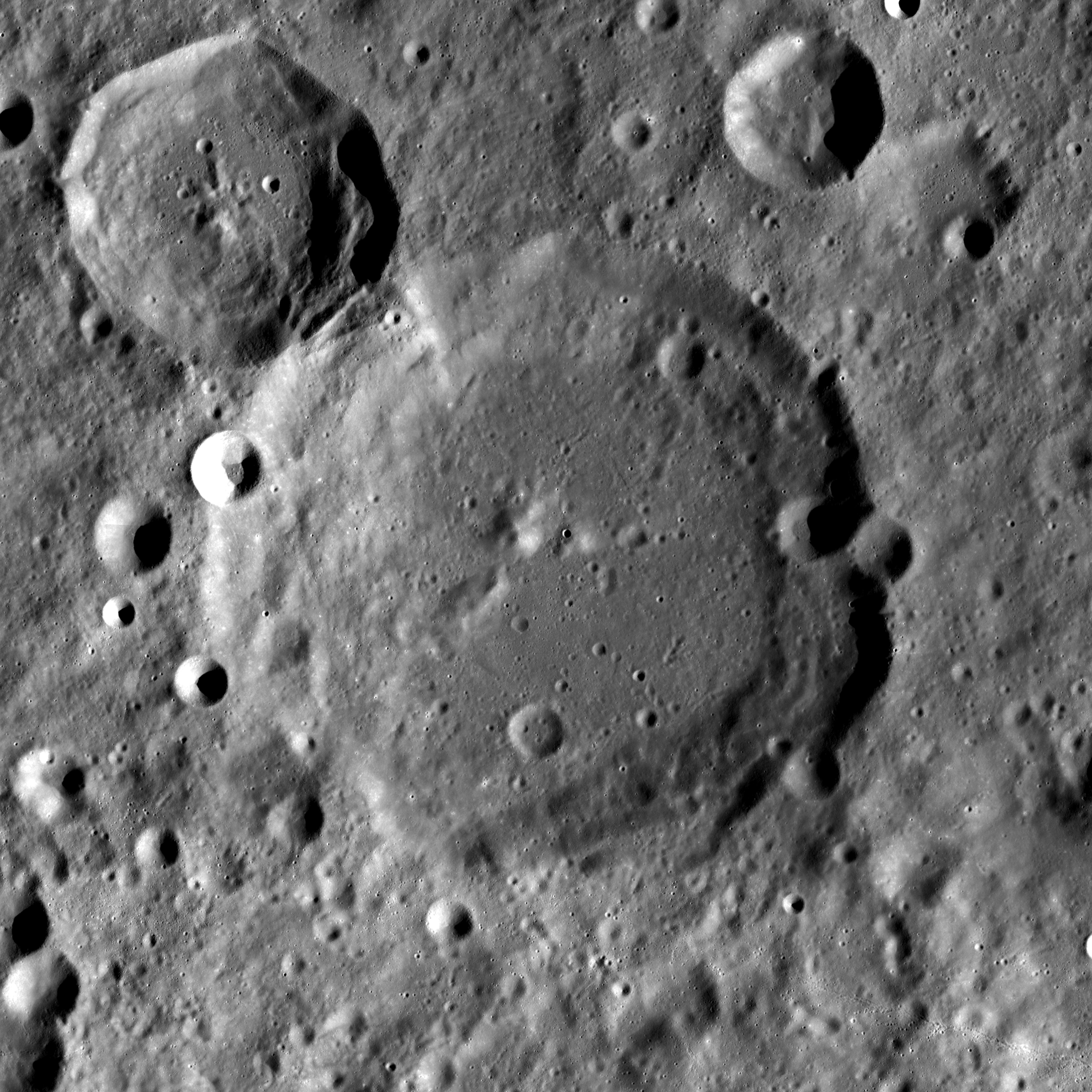
- Coordinates: 26.67°N 172.14°W
- Diameter: 104.21 km (64.75 mi)
- Depth: Unknown
- Colongitude: 173° at sunrise
- Eponym: George F. FitzGerald

FitzGerald is a large lunar impact crater on the far side of the Moon. It lies to the west-southwest of the crater Cockcroft, and about two crater diameters to the northeast of Morse. Along with Jackson crater, this feature lies in proximity to the Fitzgerald–Jackson basin.

This is an impact crater with features that have become degraded by subsequent impacts in the vicinity. The younger satellite crater FitzGerald W is attached to the exterior along the northwest. Faint ray material extends from the southeastern rim of this satellite across the western floor of FitzGerald, although it is unclear if this impact is the source or if it came from the rayed crater Moore F to the north.

Several smaller craters also lie along the rim of FitzGerald, with a joined pair along the eastern rim and two more along the western edge. The inner walls display some indications of past slumping and terracing, although these features have become smoothed out with time. The interior floor is a nearly level, featureless plain, with some slight irregularities to the northeast.

This formation is named after Irish physicist George Francis FitzGerald (1851–1901). Its designation was officially adopted by the International Astronomical Union in 1970.

== Satellite craters ==
By convention these features are identified on lunar maps by placing the letter on the side of the crater midpoint that is closest to FitzGerald.

Fitzgerald	Coordinares	Diameter
B	29.02°N 170.74°W	24 km
W	28.50°N 173.99°W	49 km
Y	30.90°N 172.93°W	35 km
