= František Nušl =

Czech astronomer and politician

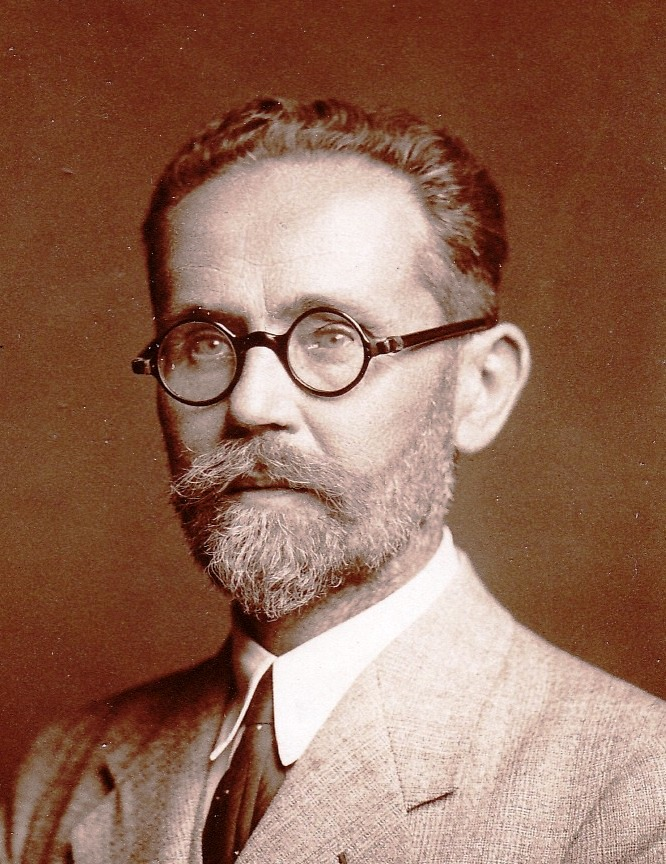
František Nušl (1930)

František Nušl (Czech pronunciation: [ˈfrantɪʃɛk ˈnuʃl̩]; 3 December 1867, in Jindřichův Hradec – 17 September 1951, in Prague) was a Czech astronomer and mathematician.

== Life ==
After high school in Jindřichův Hradec, he studied physics and astronomy in Prague, where he met among others the future president of Czechoslovakia, T. G. Masaryk, the linguist Jan Gebauer and the historian Josef Goll, with whom he collaborated on Otto's encyclopedia. After 1893 he taught maths on various high schools and met with J. J. Frič, a manufacturer of precision instruments. In 1898 Frič bought a large piece of land in Ondřejov, 50 km south-east from Prague, where they established an astronomical observatory. Since 1904 Nušl was assistant professor of astronomy at the Charles University of Prague and after 1908 professor of mathematics at the Czech Technical University in Prague (ČVUT). In 1917, Nušl was among the founders of the Czech Astronomical Society, whose president he was to become later. In 1928 Frič dedicated the well-equipped Ondřejov Observatory to the Charles university and to the Czechoslovak state and Nušl became its first head. He was a member and temporarily vice-chairman of the International Astronomical Union and participated in establishing the popular Štefánik's Observatory on the Petřín hill in Prague. Nušl was a gifted musician, he played viola and was member of a Prague chorus. He was married and had three children.

== Work ==
Nušl was a very gifted experimenter, particularly interested in geometrical optics and in geodetical instruments. His circumzenithal, jointly developed with Frič, was an ingenious portable instrument used to precisely determine geodetical coordinates. The method was based on the properties of mercury horizon and allowed to establish local coordinates with an error about 10 m, surpassed only much later by satellite navigation. To reduce the error caused by the observer, Nušl developed an "impersonal micrometer": instead of pushing a button in the moment of the passage of a star, the observer set up the instrument to follow exactly the movement of the star and the moment of the passage has been signalled automatically.

== Awards and honors ==
- Since 1999, the František Nušl Award has been given by the Czech Astronomical Society as a lifetime achievement award.
- Asteroid 3424 Nušl was named for him.
- The crater Nušl on the Moon is named after him.
- The astronomical observatory in his native town Jindřichův Hradec bears his name.
