= Dante (crater) =

Crater on the Moon

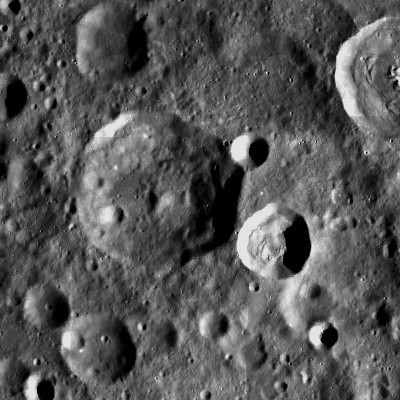
- LRO image
- Coordinates: 25.5°N 180.0°E
- Diameter: 53.83 km (33.45 mi)
- Depth: Unknown
- Colongitude: 181° at sunrise
- Eponym: Dante Alighieri

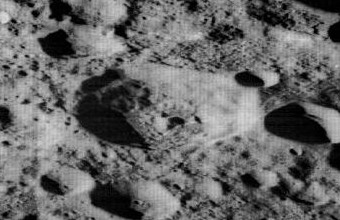
Oblique Lunar Orbiter 2 image

Dante is a lunar impact crater that is located on the far side of the Moon. It lies within the Freundlich-Sharonov Basin, in the northern hemisphere exactly opposite the prime meridian facing the Earth. The nearest craters of note are Larmor to the north and Morse to the southeast. To the southwest is the oddly shaped Buys-Ballot.

The Dante crater is overlain by part of the ray system radiating from Larmor Q to the northwest. The rim is circular but somewhat eroded. A fresh crater, Dante G, is attached to the exterior along the east-southeastern rim. The interior floor of this crater is uneven and marked by several small impacts. There is a central peak formation.

This crater is named after Italian poet Dante Alighieri (1265–1321). Its designation was officially adopted by the International Astronomical Union in 1970.

== Satellite craters ==
By convention these features are identified on lunar maps by placing the letter on the side of the crater midpoint that is closest to Dante.

Dante	Latitude	Longitude	Diameter
C	28.3° N	177.1° W	54 km
E	26.7° N	177.0° W	43 km
G	24.9° N	178.6° W	24 km
P	23.6° N	179.4° E	27 km
S	24.9° N	177.3° E	17 km
T	25.8° N	176.6° E	20 km
Y	27.1° N	179.5° E	27 km
