= Shayn (crater) =

Crater on the Moon

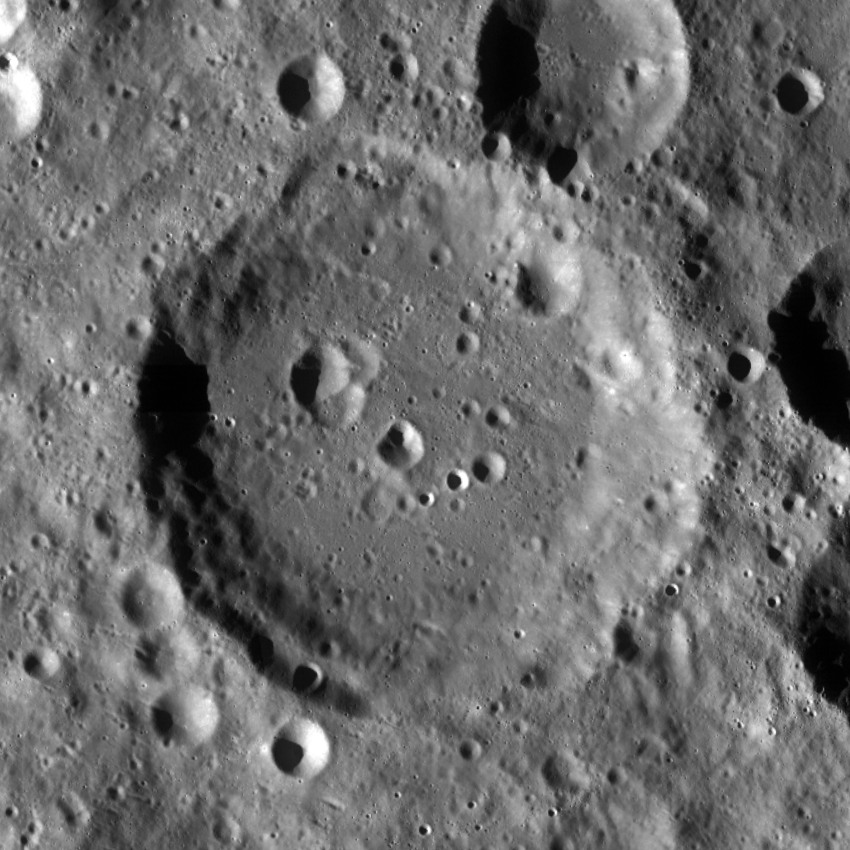
- LRO image
- Coordinates: 32.6°N 172.5°E
- Diameter: 93 km
- Depth: unknown
- Colongitude: 289° at sunrise
- Eponym: Grigory A. Shajn

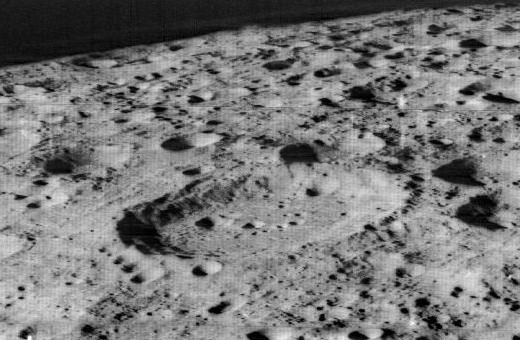
Oblique Lunar Orbiter 2 image, facing north

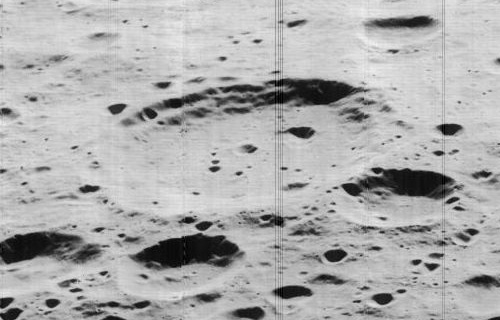
Oblique Lunar Orbiter 5 image, facing west

Shayn is an eroded impact crater that lies on the Moon's far side. It lies to the north of the crater Freundlich and northeast of Trumpler. To the west of Shayn is the crater Nušl, and to the north-northeast lies Champollion.

This is an eroded crater that has undergone wear from subsequent impacts. Most of the rim has become rounded and the original sharp edges lost from a history of minor impacts. The southern inner wall, however, still displays some slumped, shelf-like structure. A pair of small impacts lie along the inner wall in the northeast part of the crater. The interior floor is pitted with small and tiny craterlets. The most notable of these is a small crater to the northwest of the midpoint.

== Satellite craters ==
By convention these features are identified on lunar maps by placing the letter on the side of the crater midpoint that is closest to Shayn.

| Shayn | Latitude | Longitude | Diameter |
|---|---|---|---|
| B | 34.5° N | 173.5° E | 35 km |
| F | 33.0° N | 175.5° E | 38 km |
| H | 31.4° N | 175.5° E | 38 km |
| Y | 35.9° N | 171.7° E | 23 km |

== See also ==
- 1648 Shajna, minor planet
