= Nušl (crater) =

Crater on the Moon

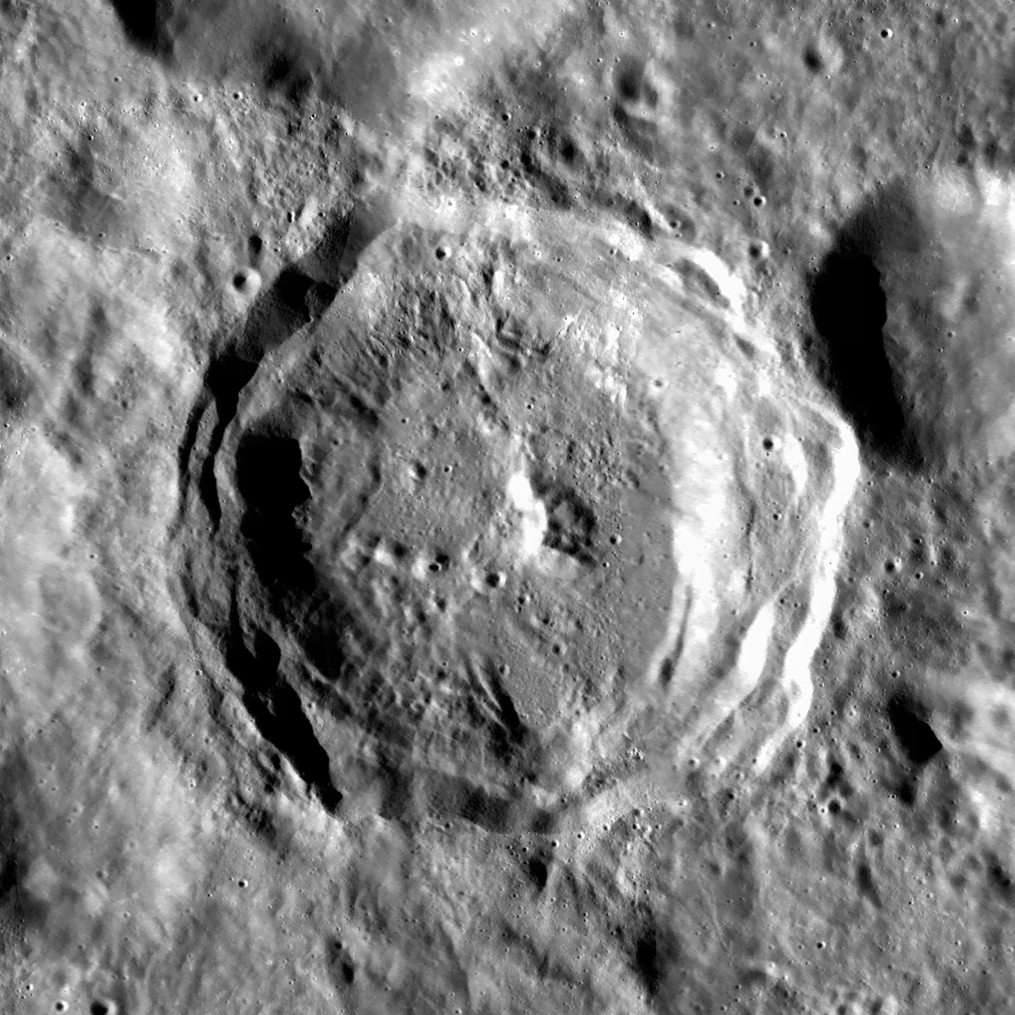
- LRO image image width 90 km
- Coordinates: 32.3°N 167.6°E
- Diameter: 61 km
- Depth: 3.8 km
- Colongitude: 192° at sunrise
- Eponym: František Nušl

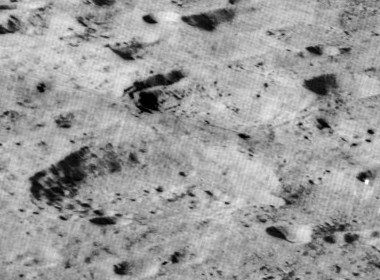
Oblique Lunar Orbiter 2 image with Trumpler below center and Nušl above center

Nušl /ˈnʊʃəl/ is an impact crater that is located on the far side of the Moon. It lies just to the north of the crater Trumpler, and to the west of Shayn.

Diameter of the crater is 61 km. Its mean depth is about 3.8 km, but the full range of heights (from the lowest point of the floor to the highest point of the rim) reaches 5.2 km.

Age of this crater is estimated as Late Imbrian. It has a slightly eroded rim, and still possesses some terrace or ledge structures along the inner wall. A small crater (Nušl E) is attached to the exterior rim along the east-northeast. The interior floor is relatively level, with an elongated central peak near the midpoint. Nušl contains only small craterlets, the biggest being about 1.5 km. It has no lava, rilles, or ray system.

== Satellite craters ==
By convention these features are identified on lunar maps by placing the letter on the side of the crater midpoint that is closest to Nušl.

Nušl	Coordinates	Diameter
E	32.8°N 169.0°E	26.5 km
S	31.2°N 164.1°E	42 km
Y	34.2°N 166.8°E	51 km

== Sources ==
- Andersson, L. E.; Whitaker, E. A. (1982). NASA Catalogue of Lunar Nomenclature (PDF). NASA RP-1097. Archived from the original on 2014-10-06.
- Bussey, B.; Spudis, P. (2004). The Clementine Atlas of the Moon. New York: Cambridge University Press. ISBN 978-0-521-81528-4.
- Cocks, Elijah E.; Cocks, Josiah C. (1995). Who's Who on the Moon: A Biographical Dictionary of Lunar Nomenclature. Tudor Publishers. ISBN 978-0-936389-27-1.
- McDowell, Jonathan (July 15, 2007). "Lunar Nomenclature". Jonathan's Space Report. Archived from the original on 2012-02-08.
- Menzel, D. H.; Minnaert, M.; Levin, B.; Dollfus, A.; Bell, B. (1971). "Report on Lunar Nomenclature by the Working Group of Commission 17 of the IAU". Space Science Reviews. 12 (2): 136–186. Bibcode:1971SSRv...12..136M. doi:10.1007/BF00171763. S2CID 122125855.
- Moore, Patrick (2001). On the Moon. Sterling Publishing Co. ISBN 978-0-304-35469-6.
- Rükl, Antonín (1990). Atlas of the Moon. Kalmbach Books. ISBN 978-0-913135-17-4.
