= Lacus Luxuriae =

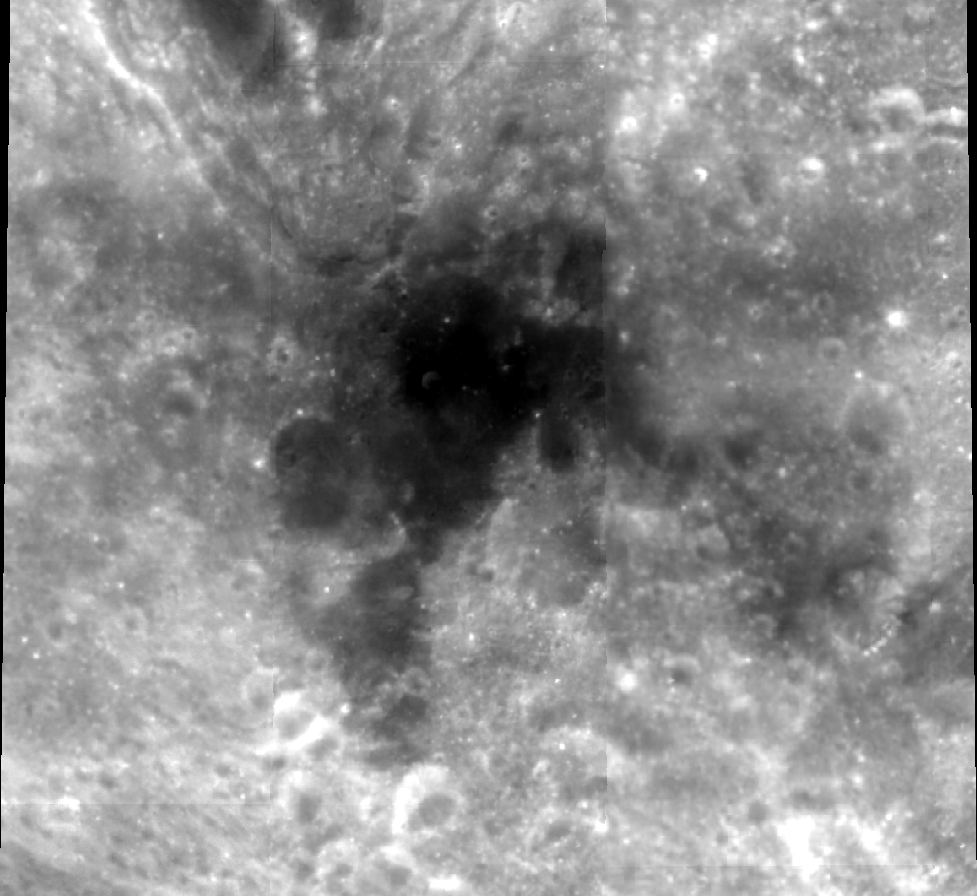
- Clementine mosaic
- Coordinates: 19.41°N 176.50°E
- Diameter: 50.61 km (31.45 mi)
- Eponym: Lake of Luxury

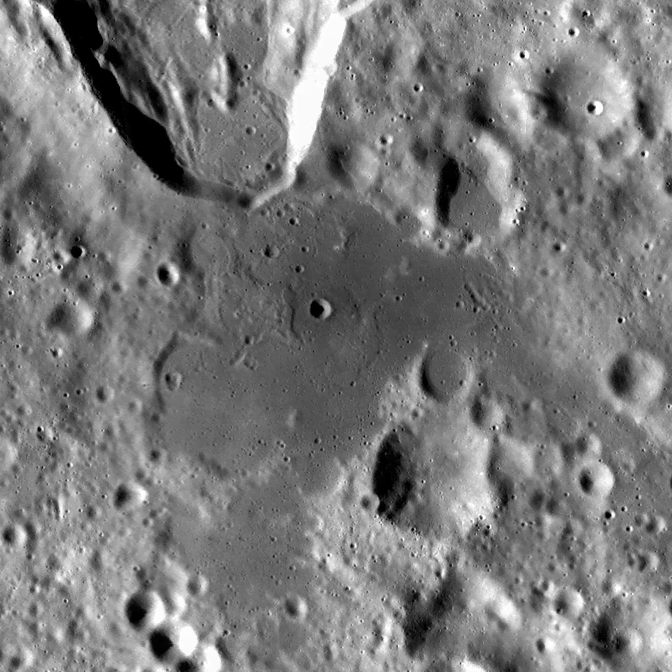
LRO image

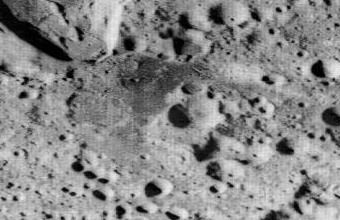
Oblique Lunar Orbiter 2 image

Lacus Luxuriae (Latin lūxuriae, "Lake of Luxury") is a small lunar mare on the far side of Moon. It was named by the IAU in 1976.

Lacus Luxuriae is at the center of the Freundlich-Sharonov Basin.
