= Spencer Jones (crater) =

Crater on the Moon

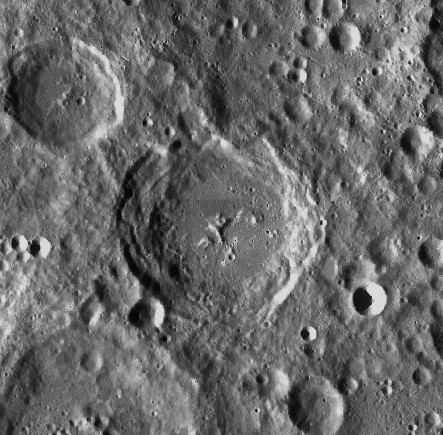
- LRO mosaic
- Coordinates: 13.3°N 165.6°E
- Diameter: 156 km
- Depth: Unknown
- Colongitude: 195° at sunrise
- Eponym: Harold Spencer Jones

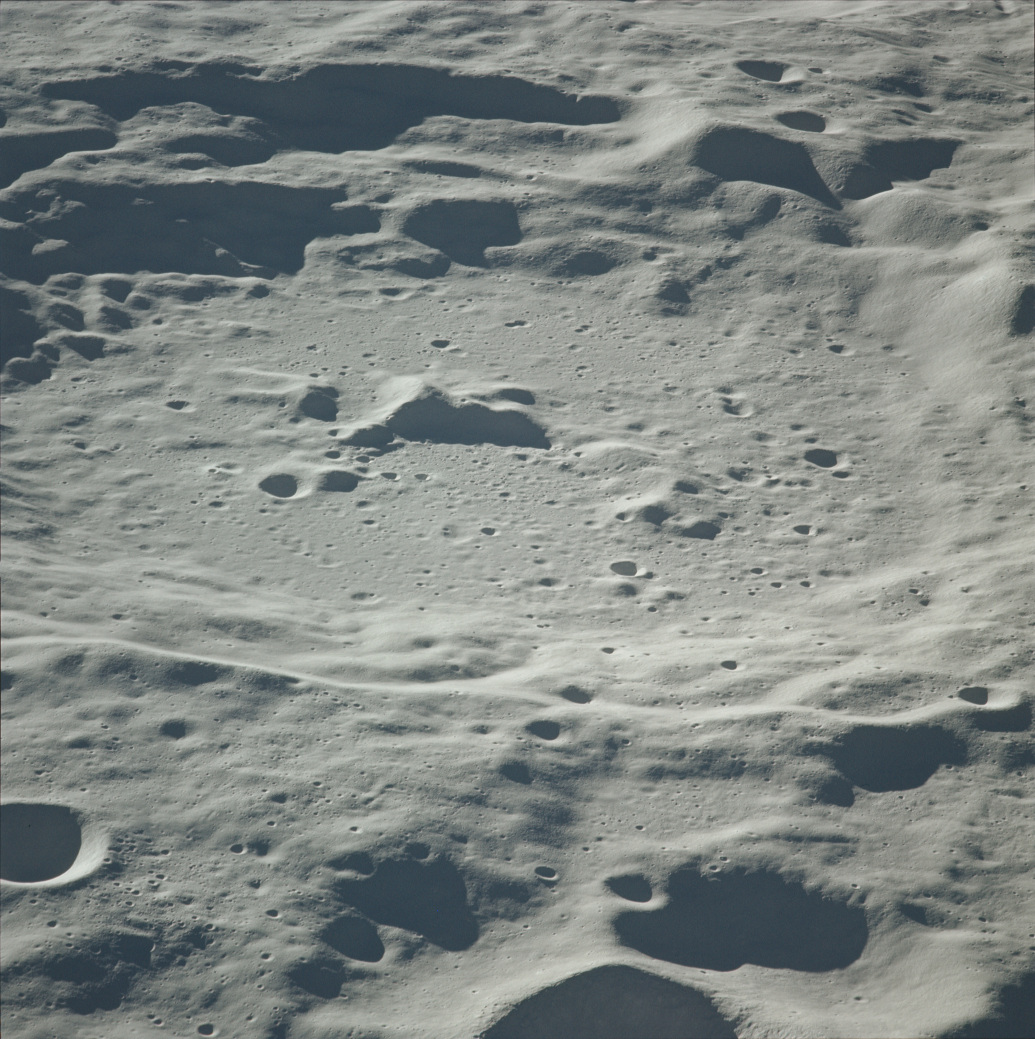
Apollo 16 image

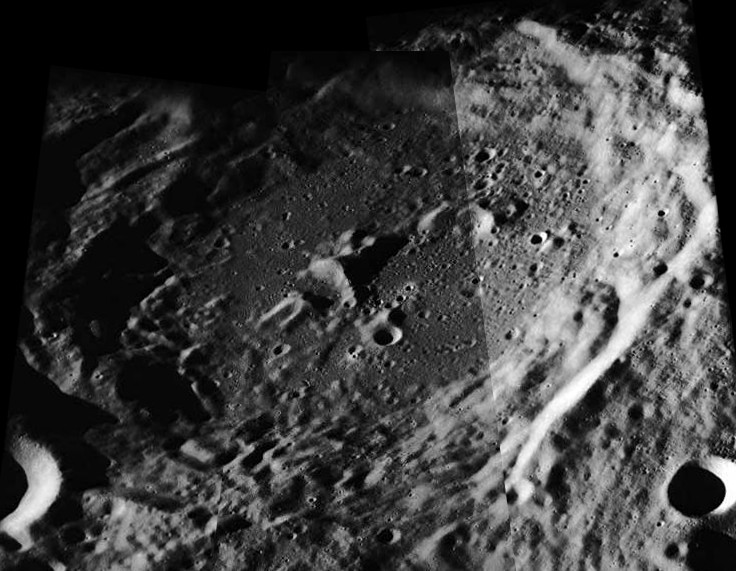
Oblique view also from Apollo 16

Spencer Jones is a lunar impact crater on the Moon's far side. The crater lies at the southwest margin of the Freundlich-Sharonov Basin. Just over 20 km from Spencer Jones is the slightly smaller crater Papaleksi to the south-southwest. To the northeast lies Anderson.

This is a roughly circular feature with a rim edge that is only moderately eroded. The northwest inner wall of Spencer Jones is wider than elsewhere. The interior floor is relatively level with a low ridge offset to the south of the midpoint. The infrared spectrum of pure crystalline plagioclase has been identified on the crater floor and central peak. Attached to the southwestern outer rim is the small satellite crater Spencer Jones Q.

This crater is named after British astronomer Harold Spencer Jones (1890–1960).

== Satellite craters ==
By convention these features are identified on lunar maps by placing the letter on the side of the crater midpoint that is closest to Spencer Jones.

Spencer Jones	Latitude	Longitude	Diameter
H	12.1° N	167.9° E	17 km
J	9.7° N	168.0° E	12 km
K	10.4° N	167.0° E	29 km
Q	12.0° N	164.4° E	17 km
W	15.2° N	163.3° E	50 km
