= Freundlich (crater) =

Crater on the Moon

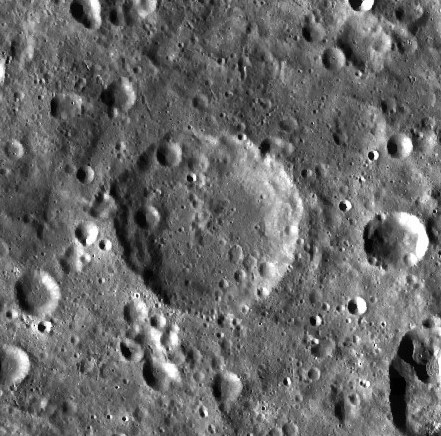
- LRO image
- Coordinates: 25.0°N 171.0°E
- Diameter: 83.16 km (51.67 mi)
- Depth: Unknown
- Colongitude: 190° at sunrise
- Formation: Imbrian
- Eponym: Erwin F. Freundlich

Freundlich is a lunar impact crater that is located on the far side of the Moon. The crater lies within the 600 km diameter Freundlich-Sharonov Basin. It is located midway between the craters Trumpler to the north-northwest and the irregular Buys-Ballot to the south-southeast.

This formation dates to the Imbrian period of the lunar geologic timescale. It has a circular rim that is more heavily eroded at the northern and southern ends. Groups of craters lie across the floor to the southeast and the north, and individual small craters lie elsewhere within the interior.

The crater was named after German-British astronomer Erwin Finlay-Freundlich (1885-1964). Its designation was officially adopted by the International Astronomical Union in 1970.

== Satellite craters ==
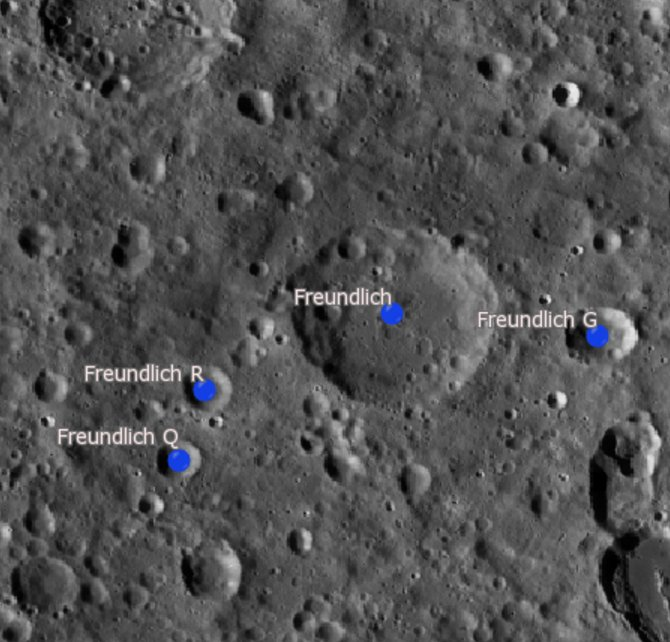
Satellite features and surroundings

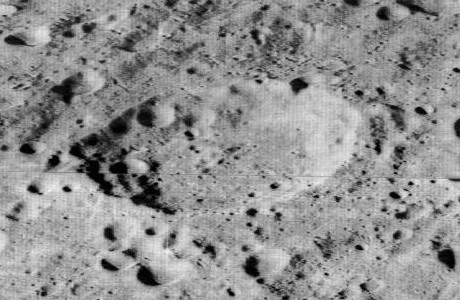
Oblique Lunar Orbiter 2 image

By convention these features are identified on lunar maps by placing the letter on the side of the crater midpoint that is closest to Freundlich.

Freundlich	Latitude	Longitude	Diameter
G	24.5° N	173.5° E	25 km
Q	22.7° N	167.4° E	17 km
R	23.8° N	167.8° E	20 km
