= Sharonov (lunar crater) =

Crater on the Moon

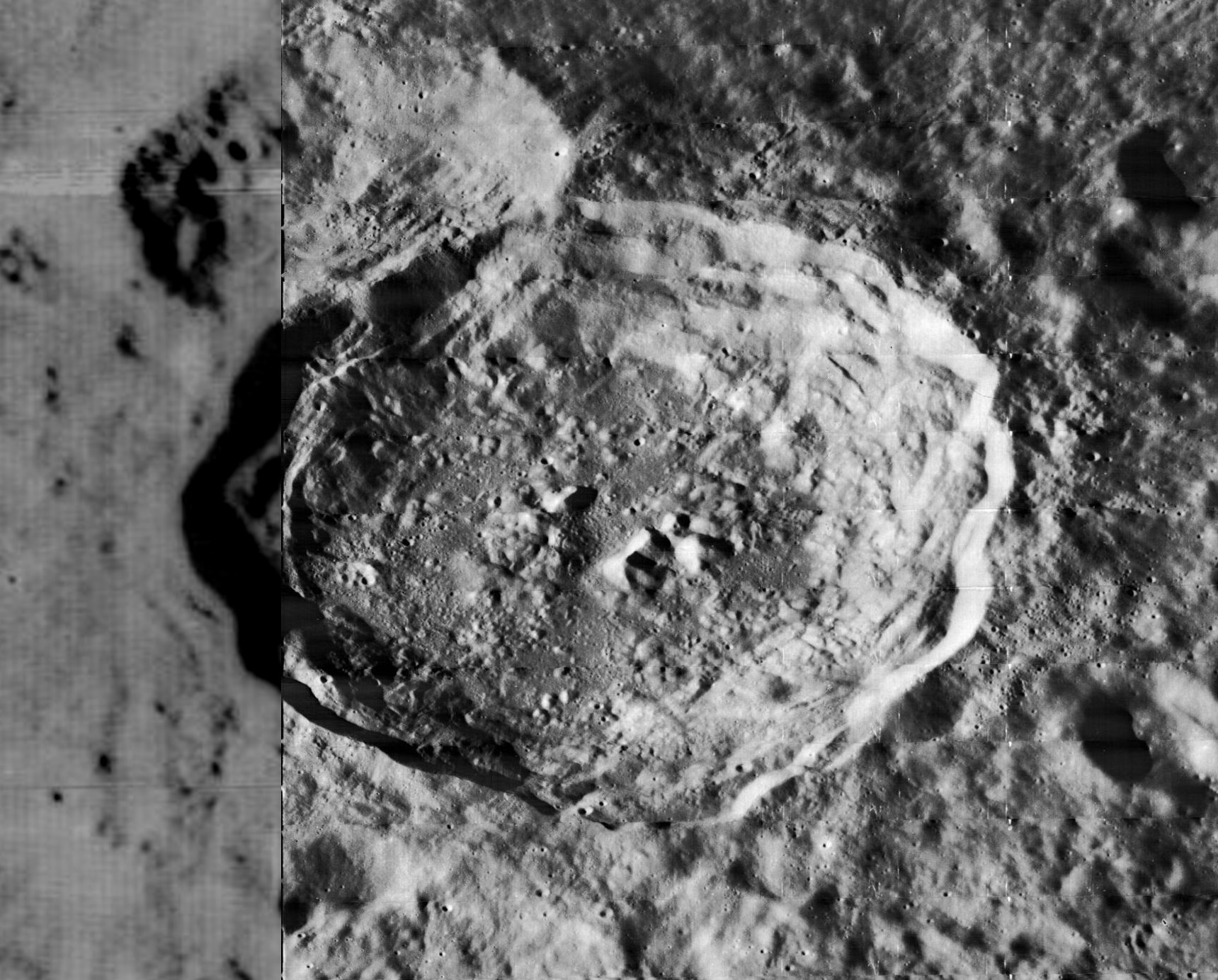
- Lunar Orbiter 2 image (mosaic of high and low resolution images)
- Coordinates: 12.4°N 173.3°E
- Diameter: 74 km
- Depth: Unknown
- Colongitude: 188° at sunrise
- Eponym: Vsevolod Vasilievich Sharonov

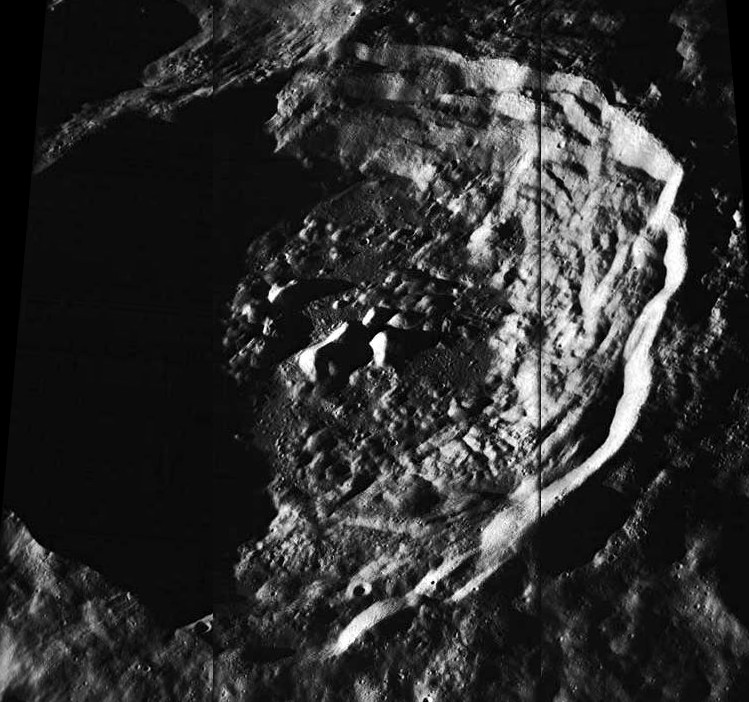
Mosaic of Apollo 16 panoramic camera images

Sharonov is a lunar impact crater that lies on the Moon's far side. The crater lies within the Freundlich-Sharonov Basin. It is located to the southeast of the crater Anderson, and to the southwest of the ray-covered Virtanen. To the south-southeast of Sharonov lies Valier.

On the lunar geologic timescale, Sharonov is probably part of the Eratosthenian System, but may be part of the Upper Imbrian System. This crater is roughly circular, with a slight outward bulge along the southern rim. The rim edge is well-defined and has not been significantly degraded as a result of impact erosion. Sharonov partially overlays the smaller crater Sharonov X along the northwestern rim, which in turn connects to the southeastern outer rim of Anderson.

The inner walls of Sharonov display some terraces, especially along the northern half. The infrared spectrum of pure crystalline plagioclase has been identified on the northwest wall. The interior is not marked by any significant impacts, but there are some ridges near the midpoint.

== Satellite craters ==
By convention these features are identified on lunar maps by placing the letter on the side of the crater midpoint that is closest to Sharonov.

Sharonov	Latitude	Longitude	Diameter
D	13.5° N	175.4° E	17 km
F	12.3° N	176.2° E	14 km
X	14.1° N	172.7° E	36 km
