= Nikolai Papaleksi =

Russian academician and physicist (1880–1947)

Nikolai Dmitrievich Papaleksi (Russian: Никола́й Дми́триевич Папале́кси, 20 November 1880 – 3 February 1947) was a Soviet and Russian physicist who pioneered radio technology and radio astronomy in the Soviet Union. He was involved in the discovery of radio wave emission by solar coronae in 1947.

== Early life ==
Papaleksi was born in Simferopol in a family that produced many military officers. His father was a battalion commander in the 51st Lithuanian Infantry Regiment and the family may have had origins in Greece. He was educated locally at then at Poltava before he went to the Universities of Berlin and later Strasbourg where he met L. I. Mandelshtam. Together they studied radiowaves under Carl Ferdinand Braun who headed the Institute of Physics. Papaleksi received his doctorate in 1904.

== Career ==
In 1906 Mandelshtam and Papaleksi worked on the production of high frequency radio waves. The worked for a while with the Telefunken company. In 1914 Papaleksi moved back to Russia due to World War I. He then worked on the production of gas triodes which came to be known as Papaleksi tubes. He worked on applications of radio communication for submarines, remote control and for home radio receivers. He became a professor at the National Polytechnic University of Odessa in 1922. He also collaborated with Mandelshtam on research at the St. Petersburg Radio Centre. He subsequently worked at the Lebedev Physics Institute and at the USSR Institute of Energy in Moscow. In 1946 he was involved in radio wave based determination of the distance from the Earth to the Moon.

In 1947 he was involved in examining radio wave emissions from the Sun and had organized an expedition to Brazil where a total solar eclipse was expected. Papaleksi died before the expedition could set out, but it was successful in demonstrating radio wave emission by solar coronae.

The Lunar crater Papaleksi was named after him in 1970.
