= Trumpler (lunar crater) =

Crater on the Moon

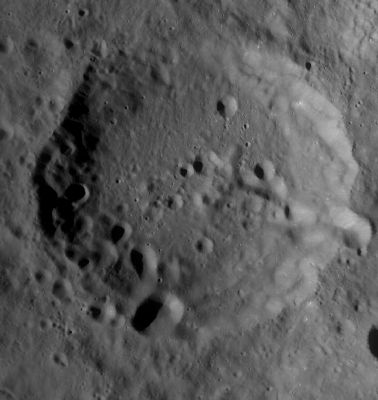
- LRO WAC image
- Coordinates: 29.3°N 167.1°E
- Diameter: 77 km
- Depth: Unknown
- Colongitude: 194° at sunrise
- Eponym: Robert J. Trumpler

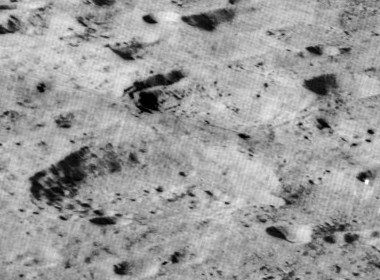
Oblique Lunar Orbiter 2 image with Trumpler below center and Nušl above center

Trumpler is a lunar impact crater on the far side of the Moon. It was named by the IAU in 1970 after Swiss-American astronomer Robert Julius Trumpler (1886–1956). It lies just to the south of the crater Nušl, and northwest of Freundlich. To the southwest is the heavily battered crater Tikhomirov.

This is an old, eroded crater with an outer rim that has been damaged in places by subsequent impacts, especially along the southwestern section. The rim edge has been worn to the point where it is now poorly defined, and forms an uneven ridge in the surface. A short chain of small craterlets extends from near the crater midpoint to just outside the eastern rim. The southern interior floor is generally less impacted in the northern half.

== Satellite craters ==
By convention these features are identified on lunar maps by placing the letter on the side of the crater midpoint that is closest to Trumpler.

Trumpler	Latitude	Longitude	Diameter
V	29.8° N	164.0° E	36 km
