= Anderson (crater) =

Lunar impact crater

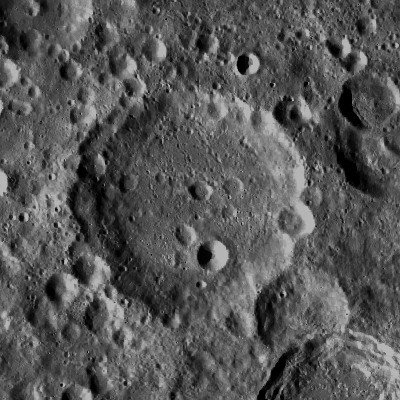
- LRO image
- Coordinates: 15.8°N 171.1°E
- Diameter: 105.33 km (65.45 mi)
- Depth: Unknown
- Colongitude: 191° at sunrise
- Eponym: John A. Anderson

Anderson is a lunar impact crater that is located on the far side of the Moon. It lies within the Freundlich-Sharonov Basin, and is located to the northwest of the crater Sharonov. The satellite crater Sharanov X is attached to the southeast rim of Anderson. To the northeast is the peculiar formation Buys-Ballot, and to the east-southeast lies the larger crater Spencer Jones.

The outer rim of Anderson is heavily worn and eroded. Small craters overlie the southeastern and southwestern rims. The interior is relatively flat, with multiple tiny craters covering parts of the floor. The most prominent of these is Anderson L, located near the southeastern rim. The infrared spectrum of pure crystalline plagioclase has been identified on the northeast and southeast rim, along with ejecta to the northeast.

This crater is named after American astronomer John A. Anderson (1876–1959). Its designation was formally adopted by the International Astronomical Union in 1970.

== Satellite craters ==
By convention these features are identified on lunar maps by placing the letter on the side of the crater midpoint that is closest to Anderson.

| Anderson | Latitude | Longitude | Diameter |
|---|---|---|---|
| E | 16.9° N | 173.4° E | 28 km |
| F | 16.3° N | 173.6° E | 49 km |
| L | 14.6° N | 170.9° E | 14 km |

Anderson E and F have fractured floors. Both date to the Nectarian period of the lunar geologic timescale.

== Gallery ==
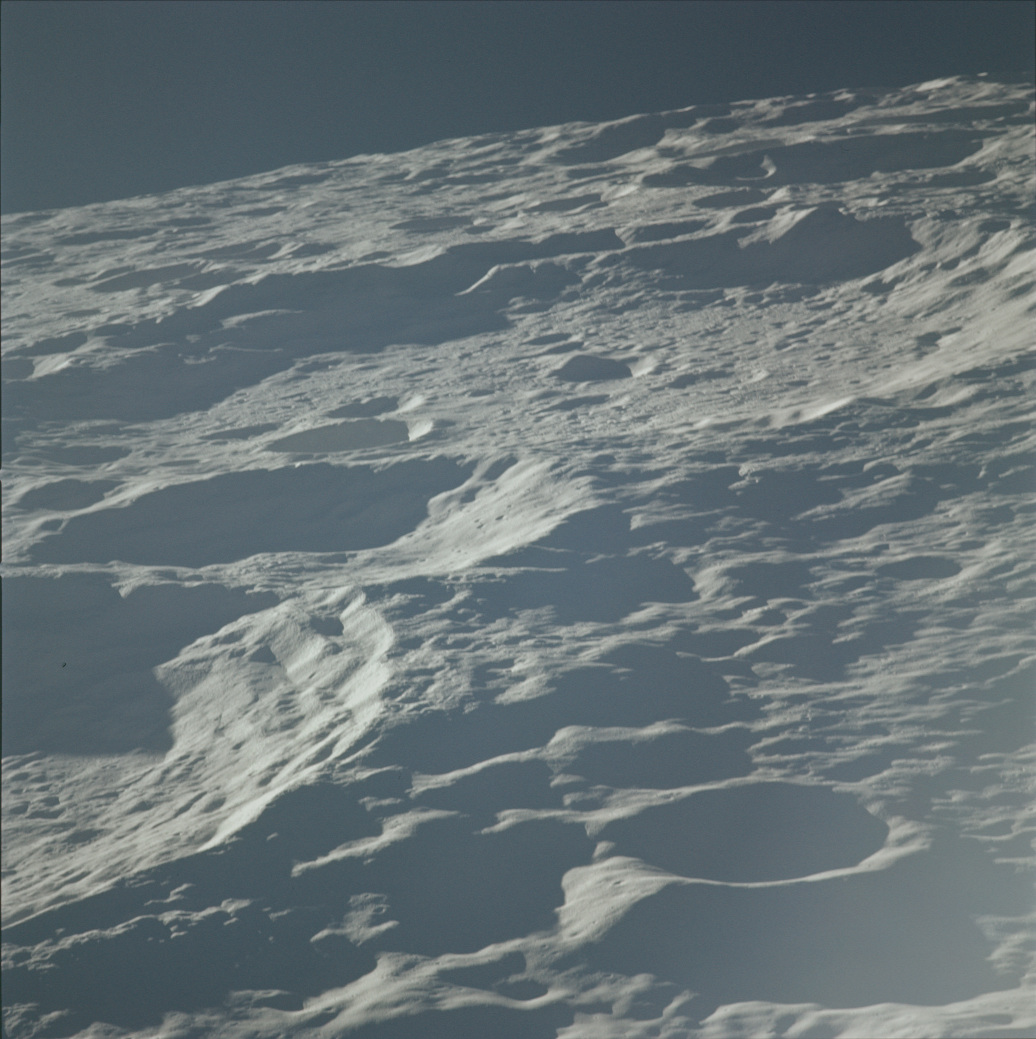
Oblique view of Anderson from Apollo 16

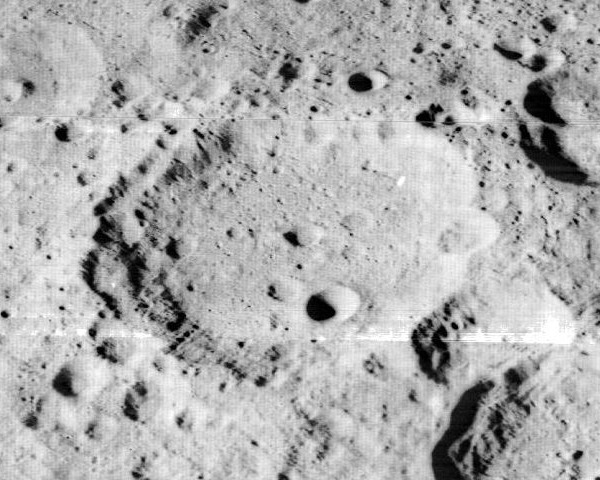
Lunar Orbiter 2 image

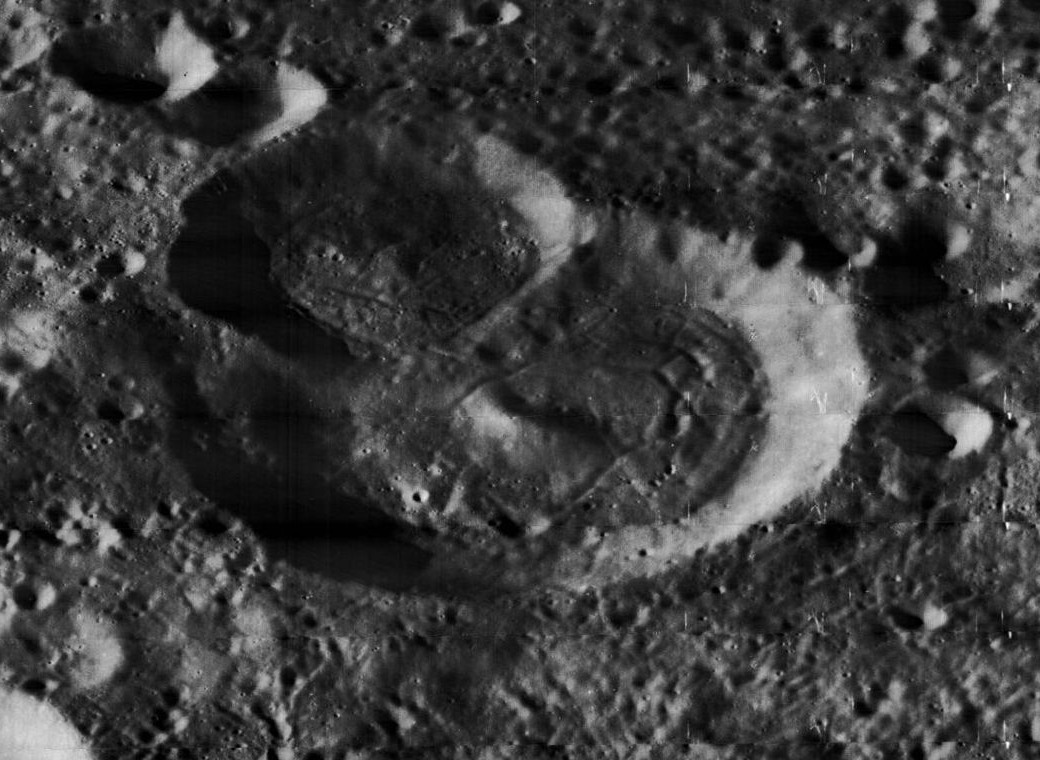
Anderson F (center) and Anderson E (upper left)
