= Hungarian names in space =

Several space objects and features have been named after Hungarian people or things in Hungary. These include planetary features on Mars and Venus, asteroids and exoplanets.

== Moon ==
- Béla (crater)
- Bolyai (crater)
- Eötvös (crater)
- Fényi (crater)
- Hell (crater)
- Von Békésy (crater)
- Hédervári (crater)
- Izsak (crater)
- Petzval (crater)
- Szilard (crater)
- Von Kármán (lunar crater)
- Weinek (crater)
- Zach (crater)
- Zsigmondy (crater)

== Mercury ==
- Bartók (crater)
- Jókai (crater)
- Kertész (crater)
- Liszt (crater)
- Munkácsy (crater)
- Petőfi (crater)

== Venus ==
- Erica crater
- Klafsky crater
- Margit crater
- Orczy crater
- Tünde crater

== Mars ==
- Von Kármán (Martian crater)
- Bak crater
- Eger crater
- Igal crater
- Kalocsa crater
- Paks crater

== Asteroids ==
- 1546 Izsák

== Exoplanets ==
- Magor
