= Izsák =

Izsák can refer to:

- Izsák, Hungary, a Hungarian town
- 1546 Izsák, an asteroid named after Imre Izsák
- Izsák Lőwy (1793–1847), a Hungarian industrialist

Izsak can refer to:

- Izsak (crater), a lunar crater named after Imre Izsák
- Imre Izsak (1929–1965), a Hungarian scientist
- Carolina Izsak (born 1971), a Venezuelan beauty queen
- Meir ben Izsak Eisenstadt (1670–1744), a Jewish rabbi

== See also ==
- Izak (surname), also spelled Izaak, Izhak, Itzchak, Itzik, etc.
