= Tsiolkovsky (disambiguation) =

Tsiolkovsky (Russian: Циолко́вский) may refer to:

- Konstantin Tsiolkovsky (1857–1935), Russian and Soviet rocket scientist
- Tsiolkovsky, Amur Oblast (formerly Uglegorsk), Russian town named for Tsiolkovsky
- Tsiolkovsky State Museum of the History of Cosmonautics in Kaluga; named for Tsiolkovsky
- Tsiolkovsky rocket equation, named for Tsiolkovsky
- Tsiolkovsky tower, spacelaunch concept developed by Tsiolkovsky
- Tsiolkovsky mission, Soviet space program named for Tsiolkovsky
- Tsiolkovskiy Island, Antarctic island named for Tsiolkovsky
- Tsiolkovskiy (crater), Moon crater named for Tsiolkovsky
- 1590 Tsiolkovskaja, asteroid named for Tsiolkovsky

== See also ==
- Ziółkowski (surname), Tsiolkovsky's Polish ancestry
