= Schaeberle (disambiguation) =

John Martin Schaeberle (1853–1924) was a German-American astronomer.

Schaeberle may also refer to:

- Schaeberle (lunar crater)
- Schaeberle (Martian crater)
