= Neupokoyev Bight =

Bay in Antarctica

- Location in Antarctica
- Coordinates: 70°5′S 4°45′E
- Ocean/sea sources: Southern Ocean
- Basin countries: Antarctica
- Settlements: None

Neupokoyev Bight is a bight 30 nautical miles (60 km) wide, indenting the ice shelf that fringes the coast of Queen Maud Land about 20 nautical miles (37 km) northeast of Tsiolkovskiy Island. The feature was photographed from the air by Norwegian Antarctic Expedition in 1958-59 and roughly mapped from these photos. It was also mapped by Soviet Antarctic Expedition in 1961 and named for Konstantin Neupokoev (1884—1924), a naval officer, hydrographer and explorer of the Russian Hydrographic Service in Soviet times who worked in northern polar areas in the 1920s.

== Named features ==
Several small bay and other features along the Neupokoyev Bight have been named by various expeditions and survey groups.

Proshchaniya Bay and Pryamougol'naya Bay indent the southwest and southeast sides of Neupokoyev Bight, respectively. Both features were photographed from the air by the Norwegian Antarctic Expedition in 1958-59 and roughly mapped from these photos. It was also mapped by the Soviet Antarctic Expedition in 1961. The Soviet expedition named them "Bukhta Proshchaniya" ("farewell bay") and "Bukhta Pryamougol'naya" ("rectangle bay"), respectively.
