= Izsak (crater) =

Crater on the Moon

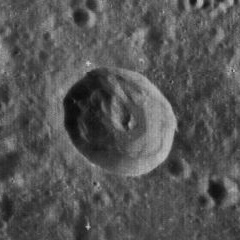
- Lunar Orbiter 3 image
- Coordinates: 23.3°S 117.1°E
- Diameter: 30.83 km
- Depth: 3.4
- Colongitude: 243° at sunrise
- Eponym: Imre Izsák

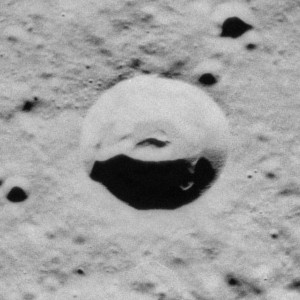
Oblique Apollo 17 image, facing east

Izsak is a small lunar impact crater that is located on the Moon's far side, hidden from view from the Earth. It lies about half-way between two walled plains; Fermi to the northeast and Milne to the southwest. Due south of Izsak is the larger crater Schaeberle. Izsak is a circular, nearly symmetric crater formation with a sharp-edged rim that has received little erosion. At the midpoint of the interior floor is a small central peak. The infrared spectrum of pure crystalline plagioclase has been identified on this rise.

== Satellite craters ==
By convention these features are identified on lunar maps by placing the letter on the side of the crater midpoint that is closest to Izsak.

Feature	Latitude	Longitude	Diameter	Ref
Izsak T	23.2° S	114.8° E	13.04 km	WGPSN

== See also ==
- 1546 Izsák, asteroid
