= Xenophon (crater) =

Crater on the Moon

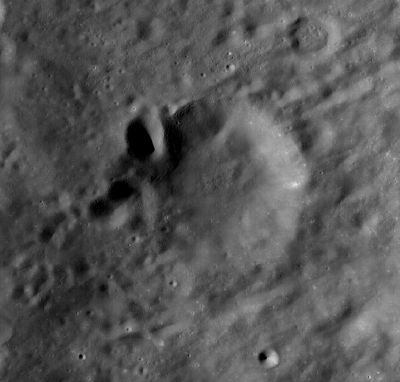
- LRO image
- Coordinates: 22.79°S 122.05°E
- Diameter: 25.50 km (15.84 mi)
- Depth: Unknown
- Colongitude: 238° at sunrise
- Eponym: Xenophon

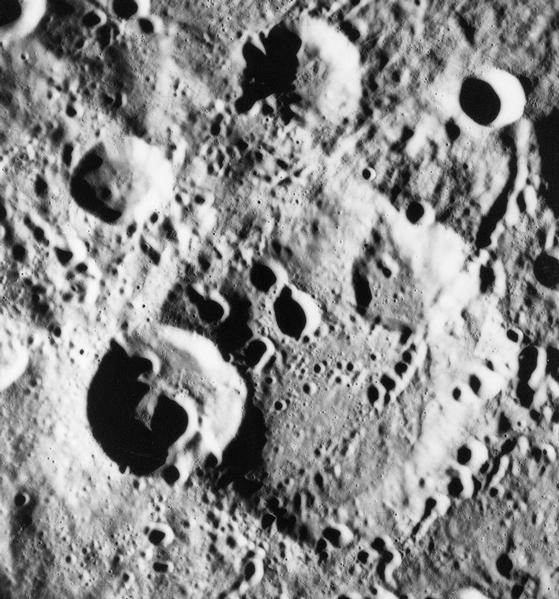
Xenophon is at top center, to the north of Zhiritskiy F. Apollo 15 image.

Xenophon is a small lunar impact crater that lies across the southern rim of the walled plain called Fermi, to the west of the crater Tsiolkovskiy. It was named by the IAU in 1976, after the Greek philosopher Xenophon. This crater is located on the far side of the Moon and cannot be seen directly from the Earth.

The worn rim of this crater is eroded and crossed by several small craters, especially along the western edge. The interior floor is relatively featureless.

South of Xenophon is Zhiritskiy F, a satellite crater of Zhiritskiy to the south-southwest.
