= Zhiritskiy (crater) =

Crater on the Moon

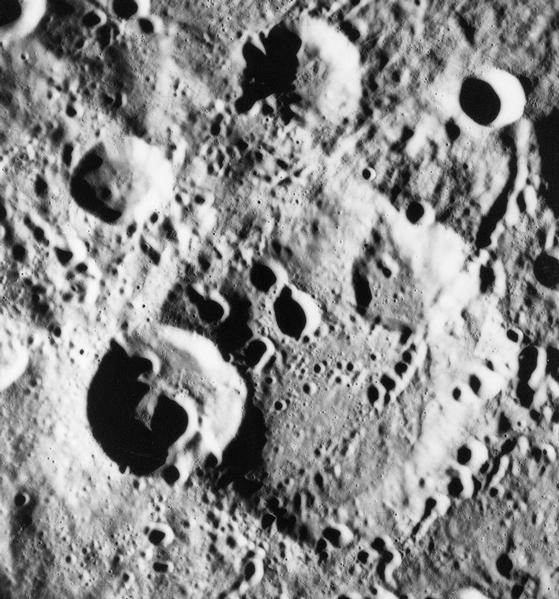
- Zhiritskiy (lower left) from Apollo 15. The larger crater is Zhiritsky F. At top-center is Xenophon, within the rim of Fermi. NASA photo.
- Coordinates: 24.84°S 120.26°E
- Diameter: 33.36 km (20.73 mi)
- Depth: 3.5 km (2.2 mi)
- Colongitude: 240° at sunrise
- Eponym: Georgiy S. Zhiritskiy

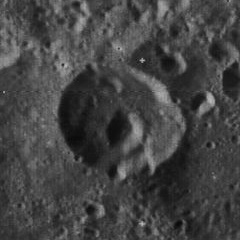
Lunar Orbiter 3 image

Zhiritskiy is a lunar impact crater that is located on the far side of the Moon. It lies to the south of the large walled plain named Fermi, and northwest of the crater Schaeberle.

This crater lies across the western rim of the much larger satellite crater Zhiritskiy F, a circular, eroded formation. Zhiritskiy is slightly elongated, having a minor protrusion in its outer rim toward the east. A pair of tiny craterlets lies along the southern rim, and a small but notable crater lies near the midpoint. There is also a smaller crater along the base of the northern inner wall. The interior floor is somewhat irregular in form, especially in the eastern half where the crater overlies the rim of Zhiritskiy F.

The crater was named after Soviet rocketry scientist Georgiy S. Zhiritskiy by the IAU in 1970.

== Satellite craters ==
By convention these features are identified on lunar maps by placing the letter on the side of the crater midpoint that is closest to Zhiritskiy.

Zhiritskiy	Latitude	Longitude	Diameter
F	24.9° S	121.6° E	75 km
Z	23.2° S	120.4° E	22 km
