= Schaeberle (lunar crater) =

Crater on the Moon

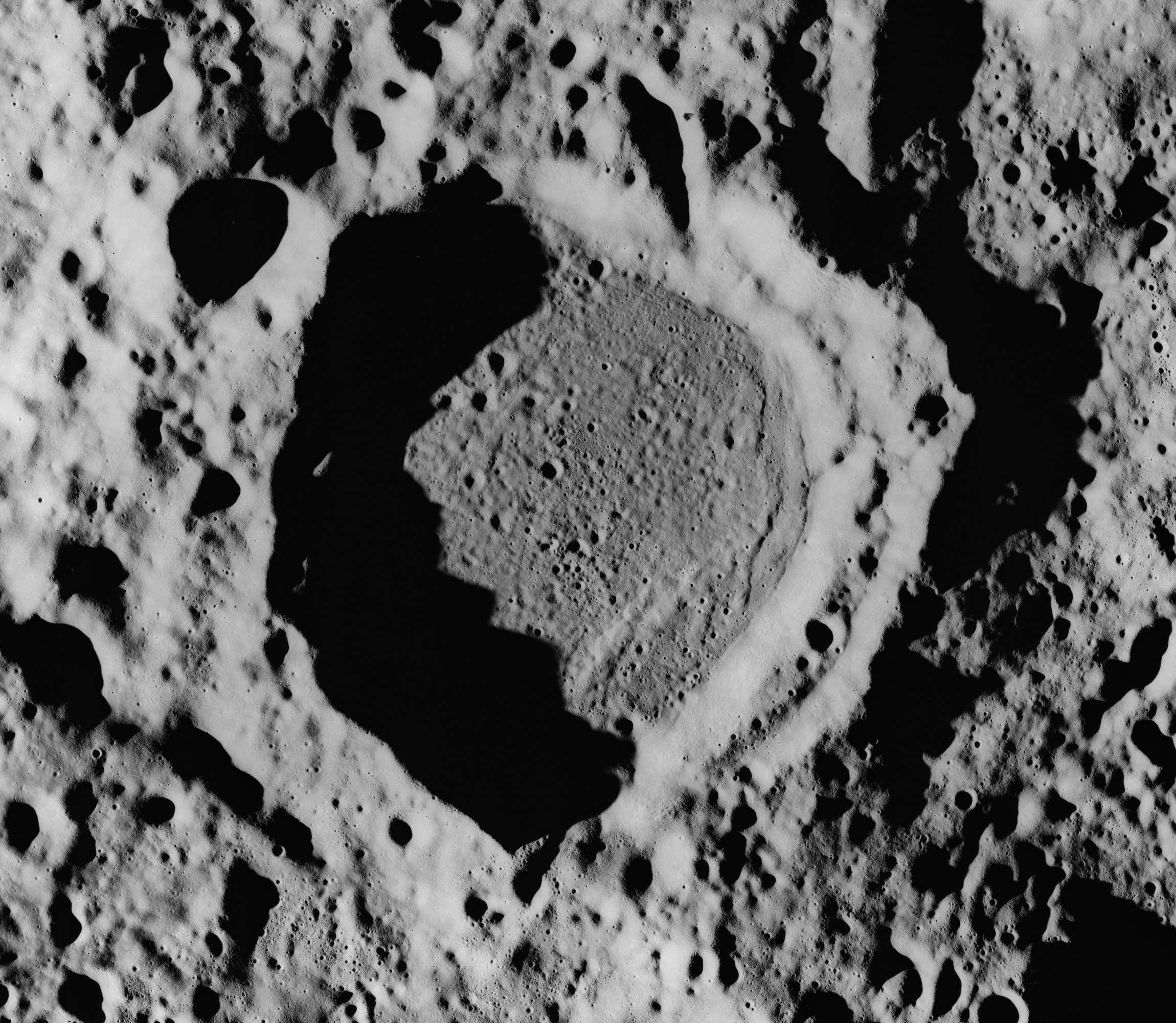
- Schaeberle from Apollo 15. NASA photo.
- Coordinates: 26.2°S 117.2°E
- Diameter: 62 km
- Depth: Unknown
- Colongitude: 240° at sunrise
- Eponym: John M. Schaeberle

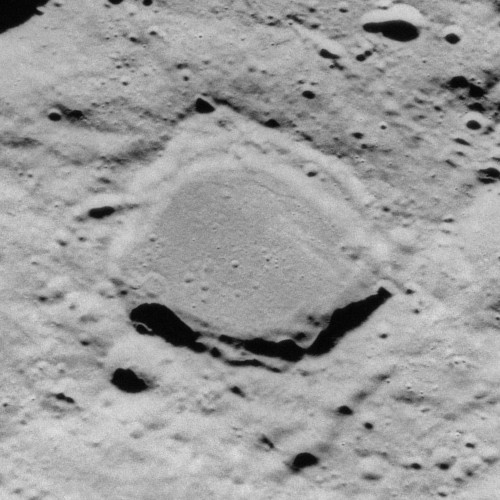
Oblique Apollo 17 image, facing east

Schaeberle is an impact crater on the far side of the Moon. It lies to the northeast of the much larger feature Milne, a walled plain. Due north of Schaeberle is the relatively fresh crater Izsak, and an equal distance to the east-northeast lies Zhiritskiy.

This crater has a worn and eroded outer rim. There is a small crater attached to the outer rim along the northwest, and an irregular section at the southern end. What marks this crater as relatively unusual for a far side formation, however, is the interior floor. It has the relatively lower albedo that is characteristic of resurfacing by flows of basaltic lava, although it is not nearly as dark as the floor of Tsiolkovskiy. The floor is marked only by a few tiny craterlets.

== Satellite craters ==
By convention these features are identified on lunar maps by placing the letter on the side of the crater midpoint that is closest to Schaeberle.

Schaeberle	Latitude	Longitude	Diameter
S	26.4° S	114.3° E	15 km
U	25.5° S	113.9° E	24 km
