= Diderot (crater) =

Lunar impact crater

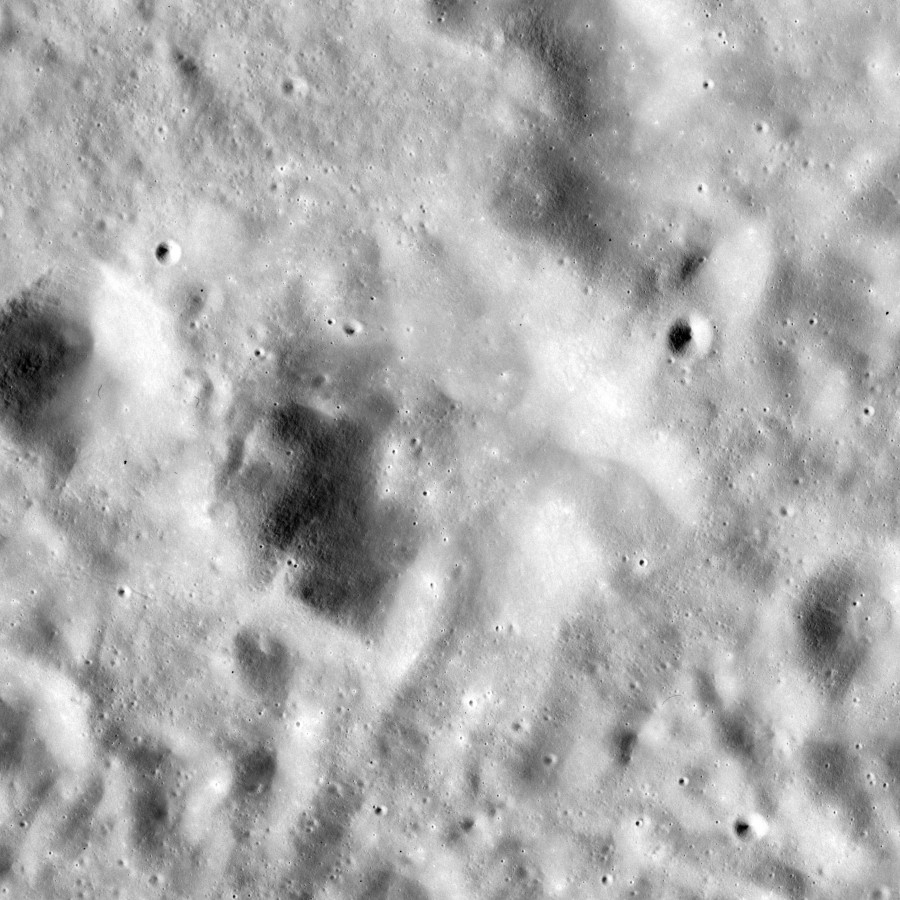
- Apollo 15 image
- Coordinates: 20.42°S 121.54°E
- Diameter: 20.00 km (12.43 mi)
- Depth: Unknown
- Colongitude: 239° at sunrise
- Eponym: Denis Diderot

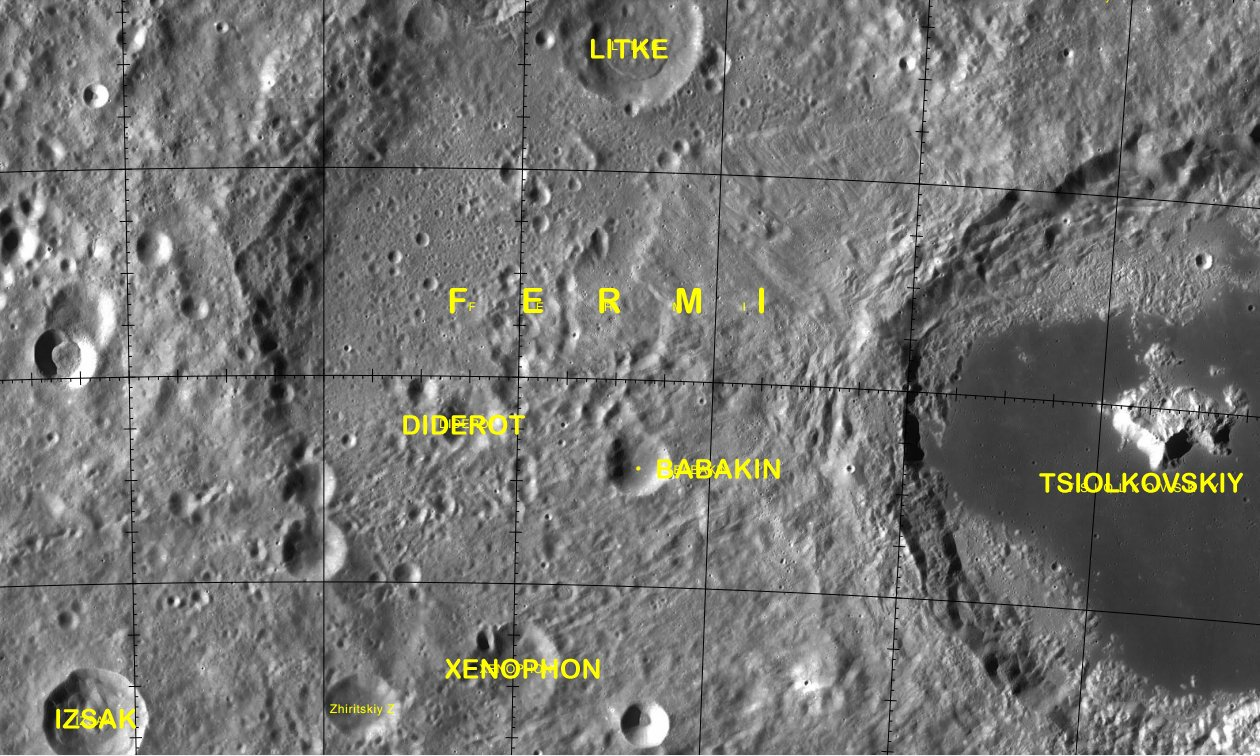
Diderot on the floor of Fermi

Diderot is a small lunar impact crater on the far side of the Moon. It lies within the southwestern interior floor of a huge walled plain named Fermi, about midway between the basin midpoint and the southwest rim. The crater is saucer-shaped and irregular, with smaller craters located just to the northwest and the north. The inner wall is narrower along the eastern side, and has a pair of ridges along the southern face. This crater is otherwise unremarkable.

This formation is named after French philosopher Denis Diderot (1713–1784). Its designation was officially adopted by the International Astronomical Union in 1979.
