= Bolyai (crater) =

Lunar impact crater

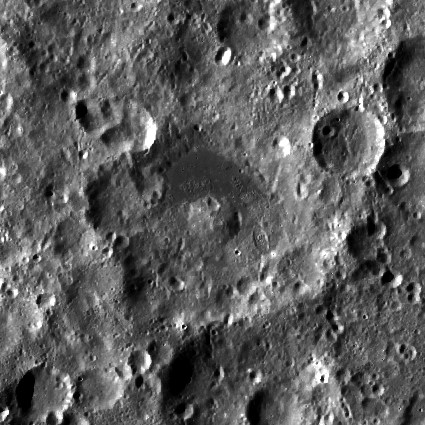
- LRO WAC image
- Coordinates: 33.6°S 125.9°E
- Diameter: 102.22 km (63.52 mi)
- Depth: Unknown
- Colongitude: 236° at sunrise
- Eponym: János Bolyai

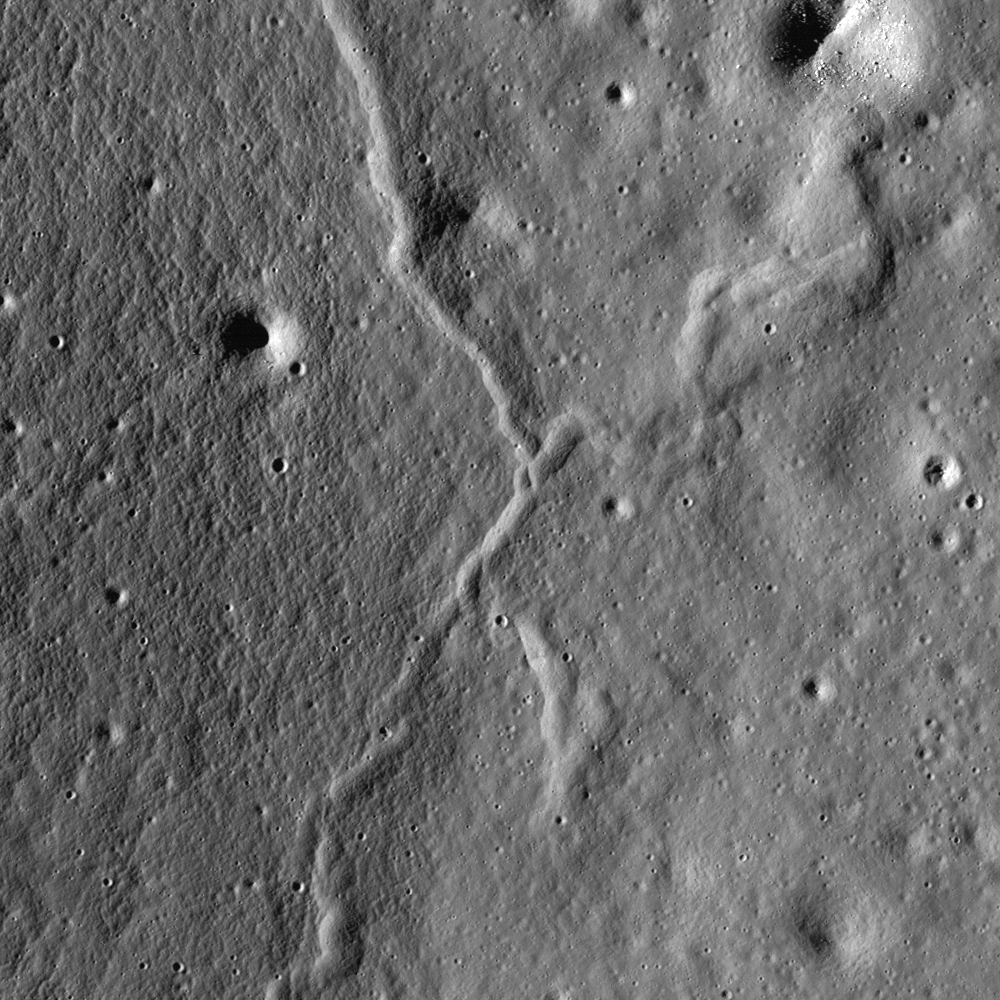
Triple junctions of wrinkle ridges at the western edge of Bolyai crater floor. Image width is 1270 m.

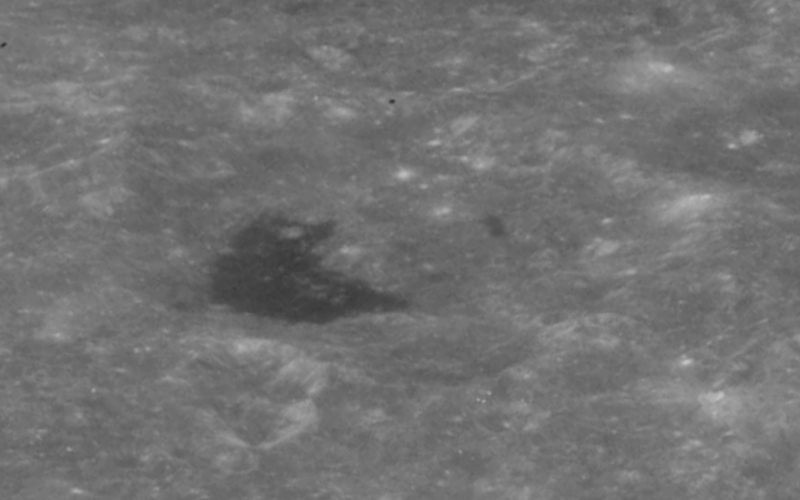
Oblique view from Apollo 8, facing southeast, at a high sun angle, so the dark mare patch is visible.

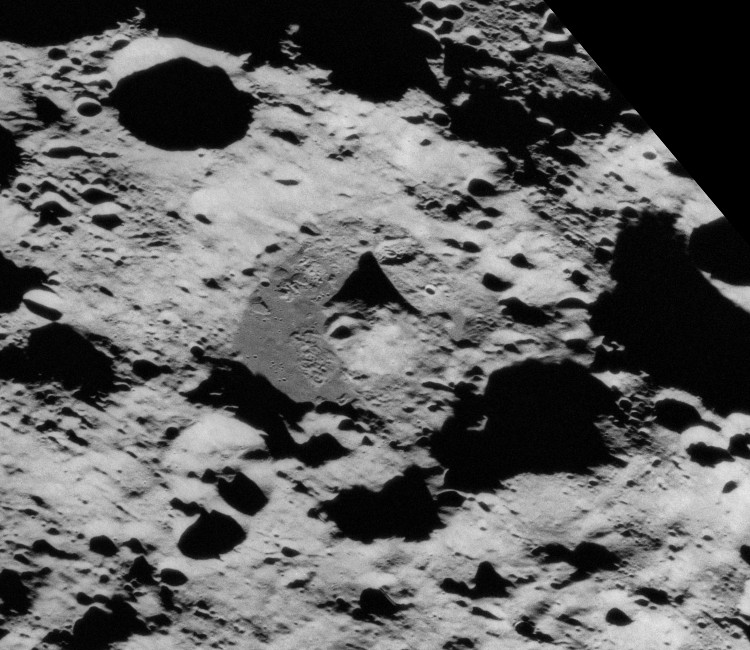
Oblique view from Apollo 17, facing east

Bolyai is an old lunar impact crater that is located in the southern hemisphere on the far side of the Moon. To the southeast of Bolyai is the crater Eötvös, and to the north is Neujmin.

This crater has been heavily eroded and worn by subsequent impacts, leaving only a deformed remnant of the original rim that is overlaid by a multitude of lesser craters. The most notable of these is Bolyai D along the northeast rim and Bolyai W to the northwest. The latter is actually a formation of multiply overlapping craters.

The interior of the crater is relatively level, but rough in places due to impacts that have reshaped the surface. Near the rounded central peak, and from there towards the northern rim, is a section of floor that has been resurfaced by mare material. This area is smoother than the remainder of the floor, and has a lower albedo, giving it a dark appearance. This surface dates to around 3.5 Ga. The western part of this mare displays a cluster of small ridges, which are likely the result of compressional stresses.

This crater is named after the Hungarian mathematician János Bolyai (1802–1860). Its designation was formally adopted by the International Astronomical Union in 1970.

== Satellite craters ==
By convention these features are identified on lunar maps by placing the letter on the side of the crater midpoint that is closest to Bolyai.

Bolyai	Latitude	Longitude	Diameter
D	32.5° S	128.0° E	34 km
K	36.3° S	126.8° E	29 km
L	36.3° S	126.2° E	73 km
Q	36.1° S	122.5° E	28 km
W	32.2° S	123.9° E	50 km
