= Waterman (crater) =

Crater on the Moon

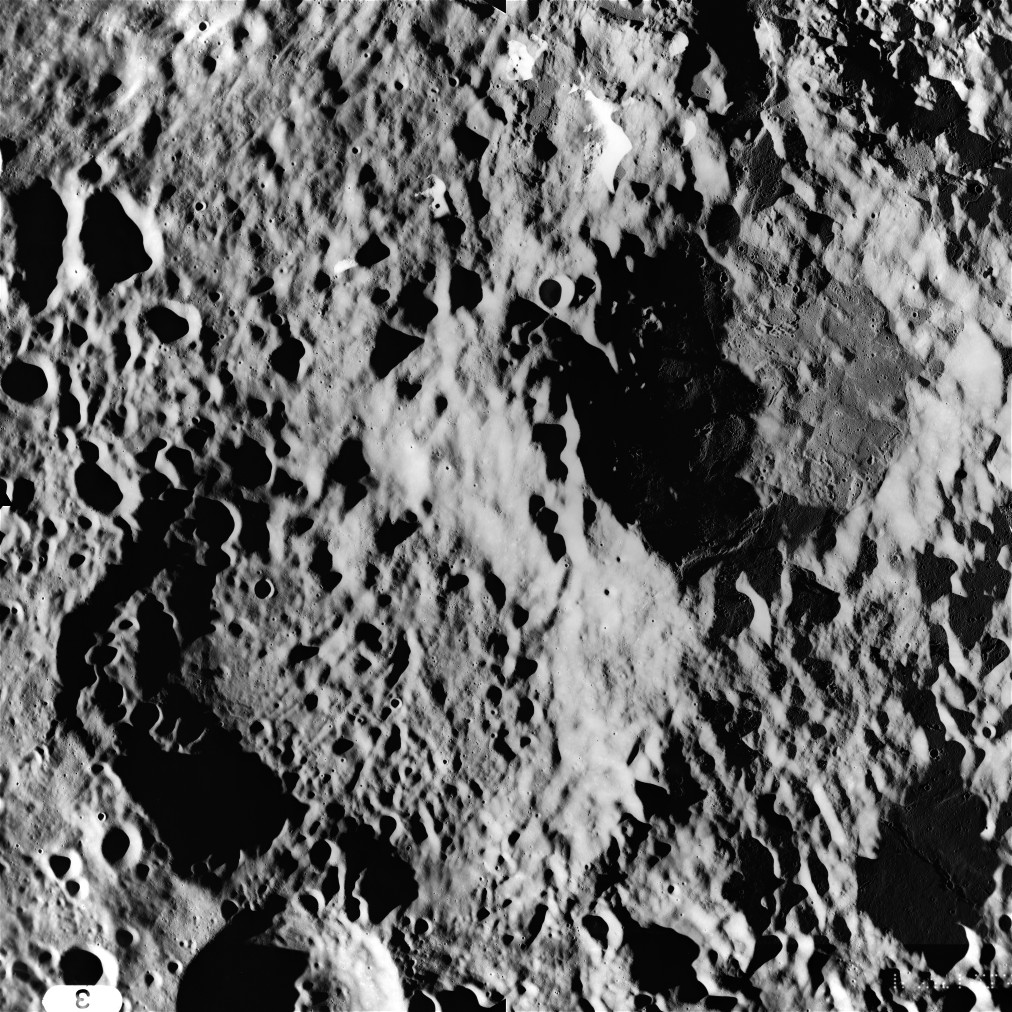
- The craters Waterman (upper right) and Neujmin from Apollo 15. NASA photo.
- Coordinates: 25.70°S 128.18°E
- Diameter: 74.91 km (46.55 mi)
- Depth: 3.3 km (2.1 mi)
- Colongitude: 232° at sunrise
- Eponym: Alan T. Waterman

Waterman is a lunar impact crater that is located on the Moon's far side, and cannot be viewed directly from the Earth. It lies along the southern outer ramparts of the prominent crater Tsiolkovskiy. Almost attached to the southwest is Neujmin, so that Waterman lies straddled between these two features.

The outer rim of Waterman has been somewhat modified by its proximity to Tsiolkovskiy to the north, and it now has a slightly oval shape. The rim edge is worn and irregular, and ejecta material has been carried into the northern interior floor. There are a pair of lower albedo patches in the southern interior, which are typically characteristic of basaltic-lava deposits. A few low ridges lie about the center and also to the east of the midpoint.

The crater was named after American physicist Alan T. Waterman by the IAU in 1970.

== Views ==
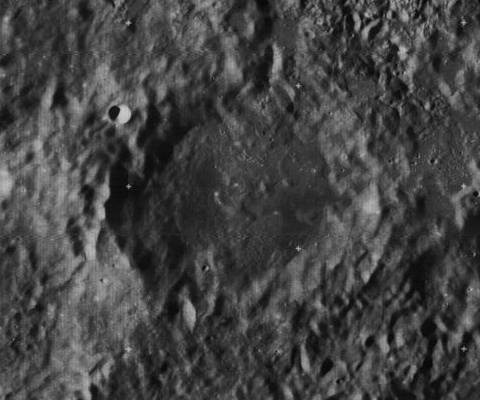
Lunar Orbiter 3 image

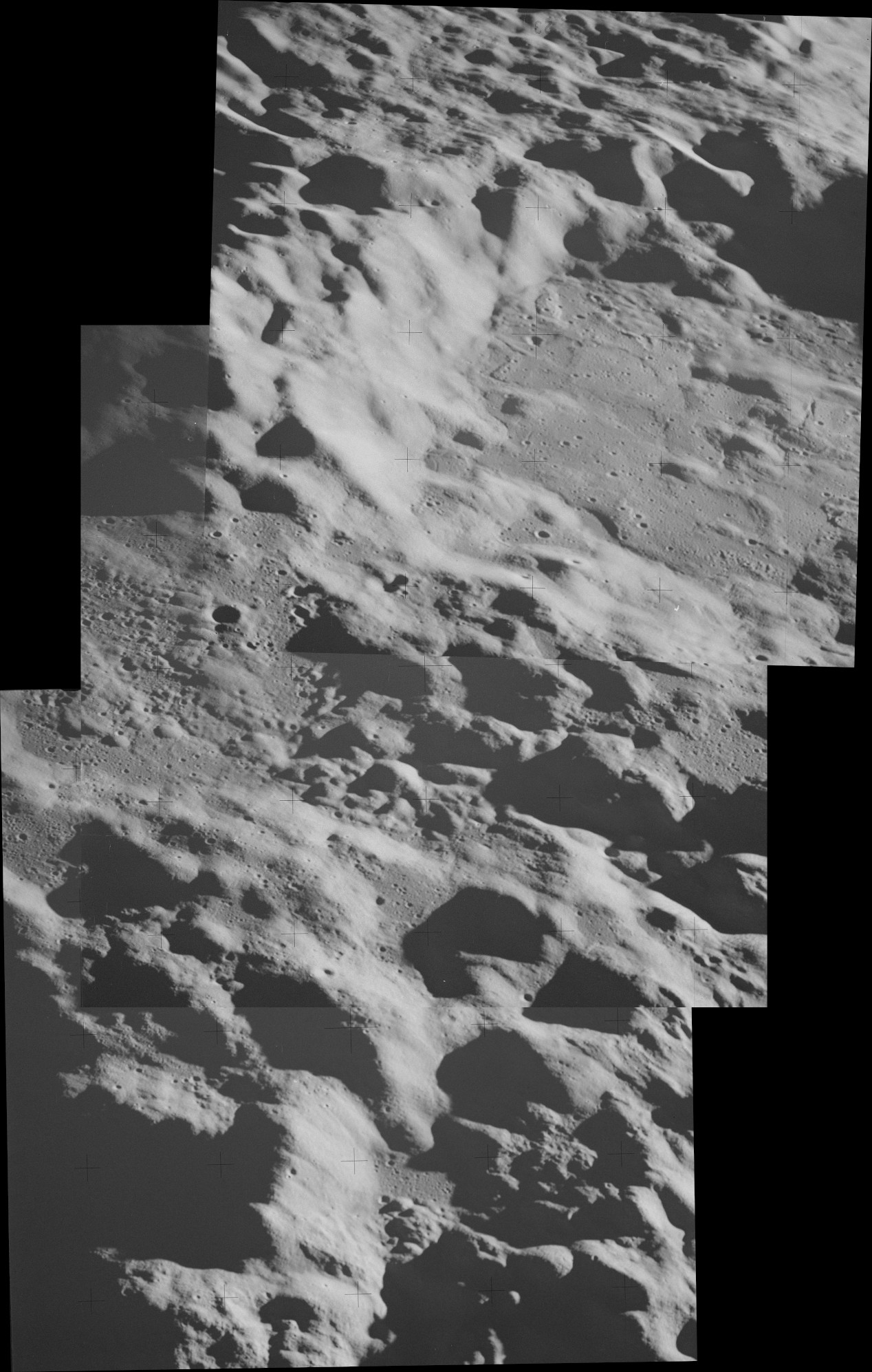
Oblique view from Apollo 17 (mosaic of 3 images)

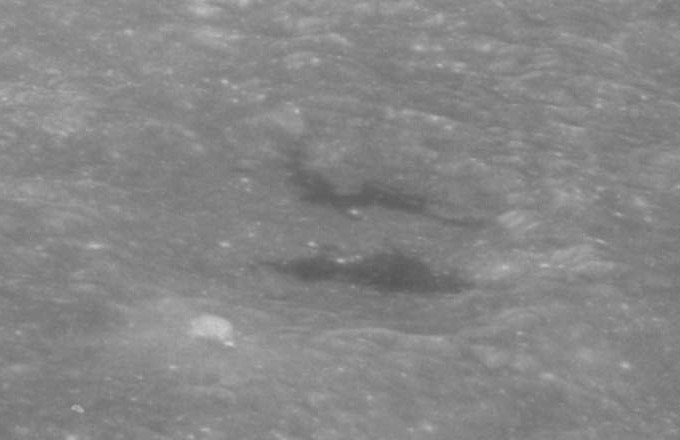
Apollo 8 image facing east at a high sun angle, which makes the two dark mare lava patches visible
