= Milne (crater) =

Crater on the Moon

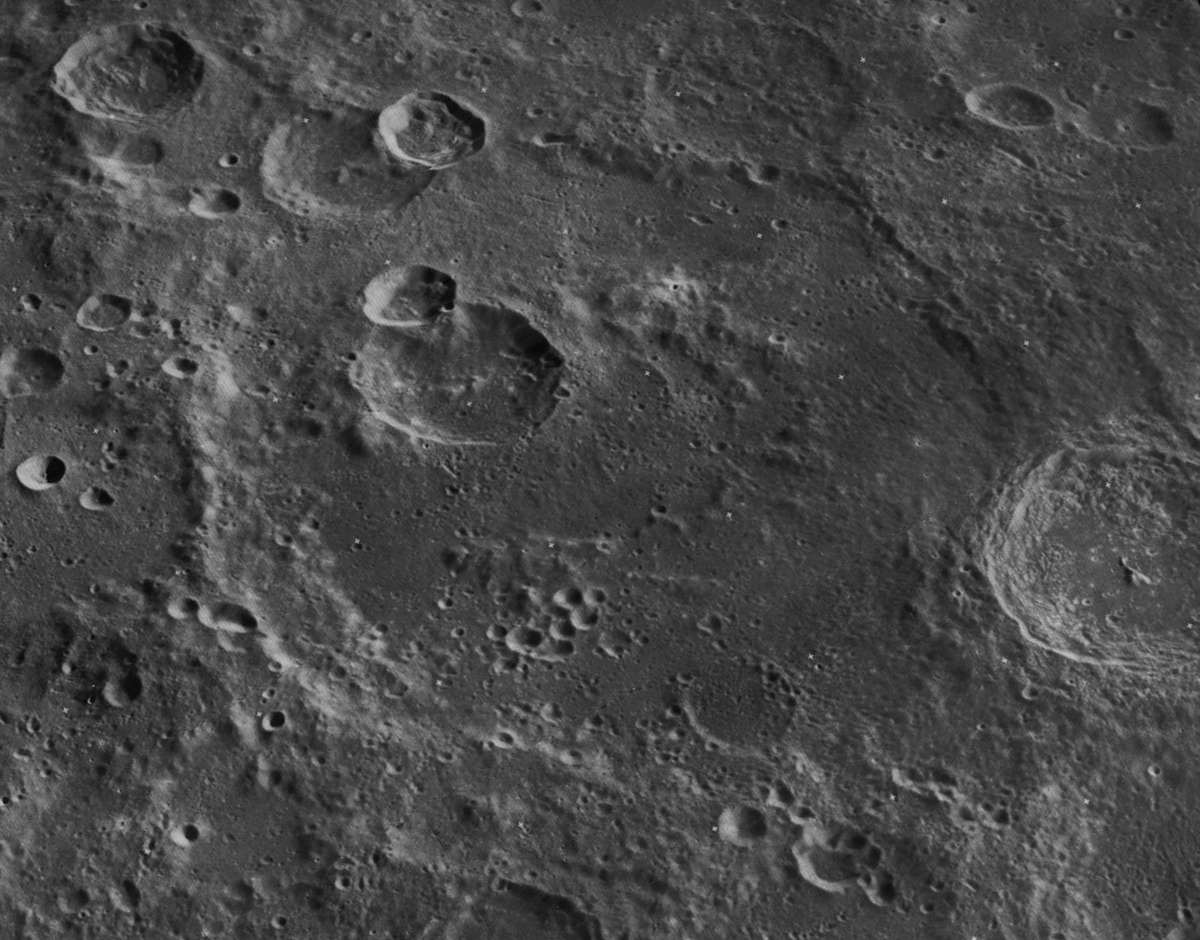
- Lunar Orbiter 3 image, facing southwest
- Coordinates: 31.4°S 112.2°E
- Diameter: 272 km
- Depth: 3.25 km (2.02 mi)
- Colongitude: 252° at sunrise
- Formation: Pre-Nectarian
- Eponym: E. Arthur Milne

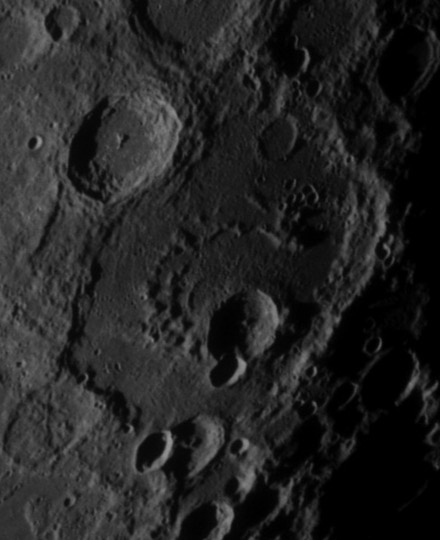
Oblique view with north at top, from Apollo 12

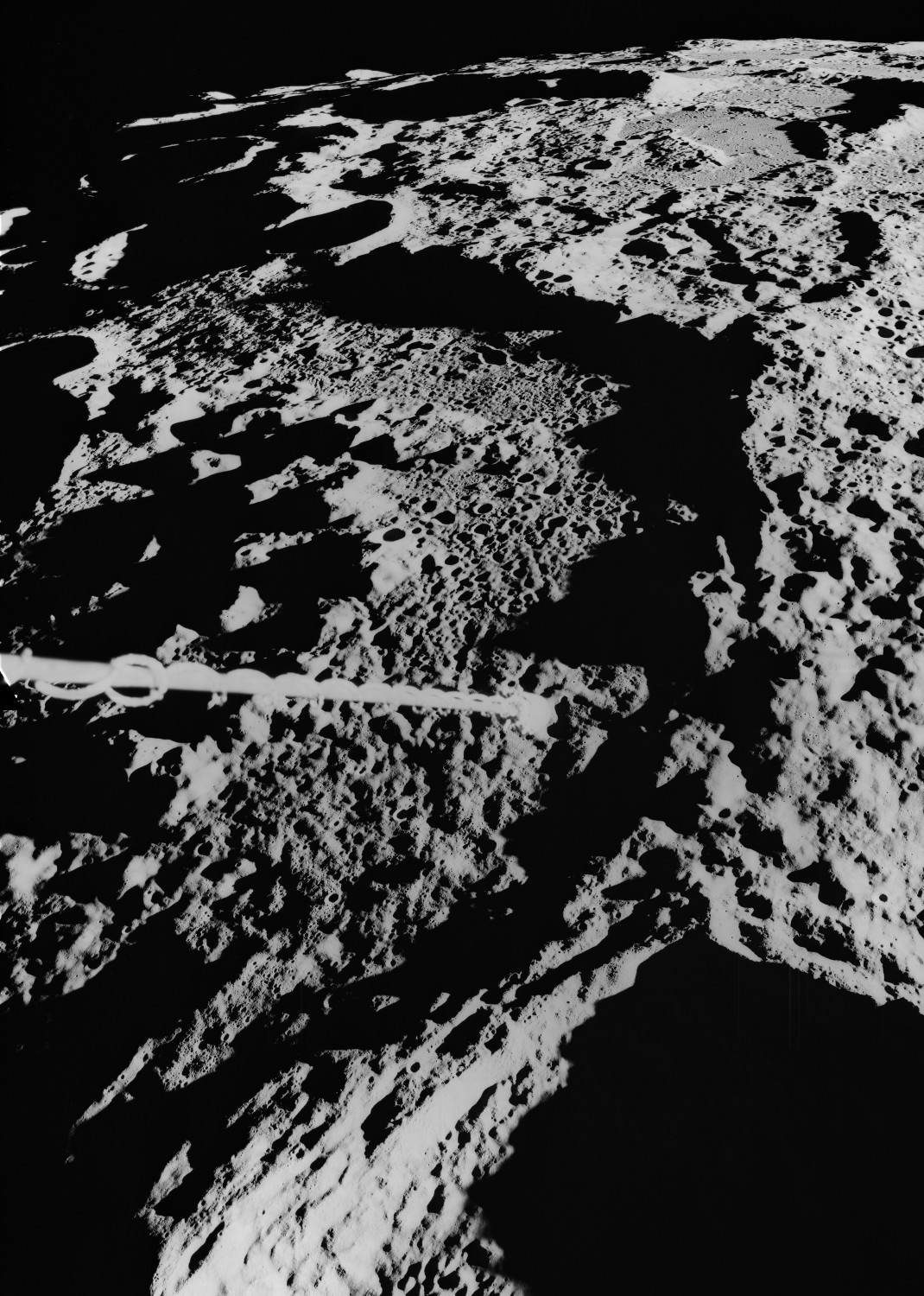
Oblique view facing south, from Apollo 15. Spacecraft's gamma-ray spectrometer is at left.

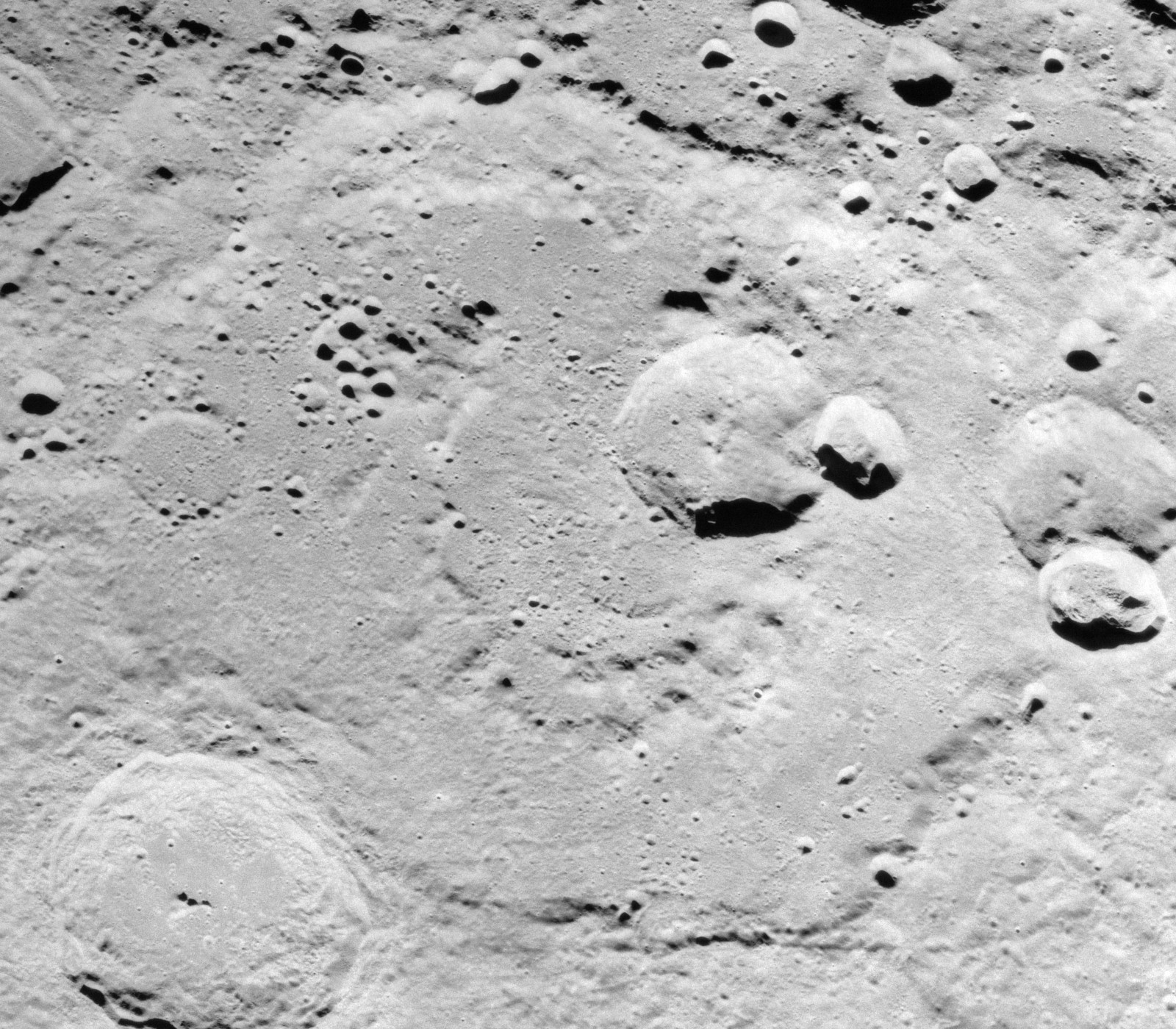
Oblique Apollo 17 image, facing east

Milne is a large lunar crater that is located in the southern hemisphere on the far side of the Moon. This class of formation is known as a peak ring basin, which has a single interior topographic ring or a discontinuous ring of peaks with no central peak. It lies to the northeast of the Mare Australe, and southeast of Lacus Solitudinis.

This formation dates to the Pre-Nectarian period of the lunar geologic timescale. It has been heavily eroded and reshaped by a long history of impacts, leaving a low, irregular ridge line around most of the perimeter. The southern portion of the wall has been obliterated by impacts, and this area is now overlain by the craters Milne M and Milne N. Milne N has a ray system and is mapped as part of the Copernican System.

The infrared spectrum of pure crystalline plagioclase has been identified on the crater floor. Although the interior floor is relatively flat, it has been marred by many impacts in the surface. The most prominent of these is the satellite crater Milne K, which is located just to the south of the midpoint. Overlapping the southern rim of K is the smaller Milne L. In the northeast part of the floor is an unusual tight formation of 10–12 small impacts that almost resembles a cluster of grapes.

The crater floor is somewhat irregular in the northwestern part, where the prominent crater Scaliger intrudes into the outer rim, leaving ejecta across the floor. Other nearby craters include Alden to the north, Parkhurst to the west, Schaeberle to the northeast, and Bjerknes to the south. Farther to the northeast is the walled plain Fermi and the impressive Tsiolkovskiy.

This formation is named after the British mathematician and astrophysicist Edward Arthur Milne (1896–1950).

== Satellite craters ==
By convention these features are identified on lunar maps by placing the letter on the side of the crater midpoint that is closest to Milne.

| Milne | Latitude | Longitude | Diameter |
|---|---|---|---|
| K | 32.5° S | 113.1° E | 65 km |
| L | 33.7° S | 112.7° E | 26 km |
| M | 35.7° S | 112.1° E | 54 km |
| N | 35.5° S | 110.8° E | 37 km |
| P | 37.1° S | 107.7° E | 95 km |
| Q | 34.3° S | 107.3° E | 75 km |

Milne N is characterised by an extremely high rockfall density by lunar standards, and Milne L by a very high rockfall density.
