= Georgy Sergeevich Zhiritsky =

Soviet rocket scientist (1883–1966)

Georgy Sergeevich Zhiritsky Георгий Сергеевич Жирицкий
- Born: September 26, 1883; Krapivna, Tula Oblast, Russia
- Died: June 4, 1966; Kazan, Russia
- Education: Kyiv Polytechnic Institute
- Scientific career
- Fields: Liquid-propellant rocket

Georgy Sergeevich Zhiritsky (Russian: Георгий Сергеевич Жирицкий; 26 September 1883 – 4 June 1966) was a Soviet scientist and professor in the field of rocket engines.

== Biography ==
Zhiritsky was born in 1883 in the Tula Governorate. In 1915, he graduated from the Kiev Polytechnic Institute. In 1918 he began working at the institute, and at the age of 32 he was promoted to professor. In 1926 and 1927, during his scientific trips to Germany, he became acquainted with the practice of German turbine construction.

In 1937, he was arrested on a false case of wrecking, and sent to work in Sharashka at the Tushino Aircraft Building Plant. There he was engaged in the design of aircraft engines, and specifically the design of the Centrifugal-type supercharger.

According to a letter of Lavrenty Beria, Beria asked Stalin to release 35 highly distinguished prisoners in 1944. Zhiritskiy obtained freedom with the removal of criminal records.

Zhiritskiy then worked as an aircraft constructor, taking up promising models of jet engines and also teaching at the Kazan Aviation Institute. Zhiritsky's main scientific works are related to heat engineering, turbine construction and rocket engine construction; they are devoted to the theory and design of steam engines, steam and gas turbines, and jet engines.

In 1970, a crater on the Moon was named after Zhiritsky.

== Literature ==
- Паровые машины. — Киев: Изд-во Исполбюро Пролетстуда КПИ, 1925. — 434 с.
- Паровые турбины. — Киев: Изд-во Исполбюро КПИ, 1927. — 387 с.
- Газовые турбины. — М.: Госэнергоиздат, 1948. — 504 с.
- Авиационные газовые турбины. — М.: Оборонгиз, 1950. — 512 с.
