= 1590 Tsiolkovskaja =

Main-belt asteroid

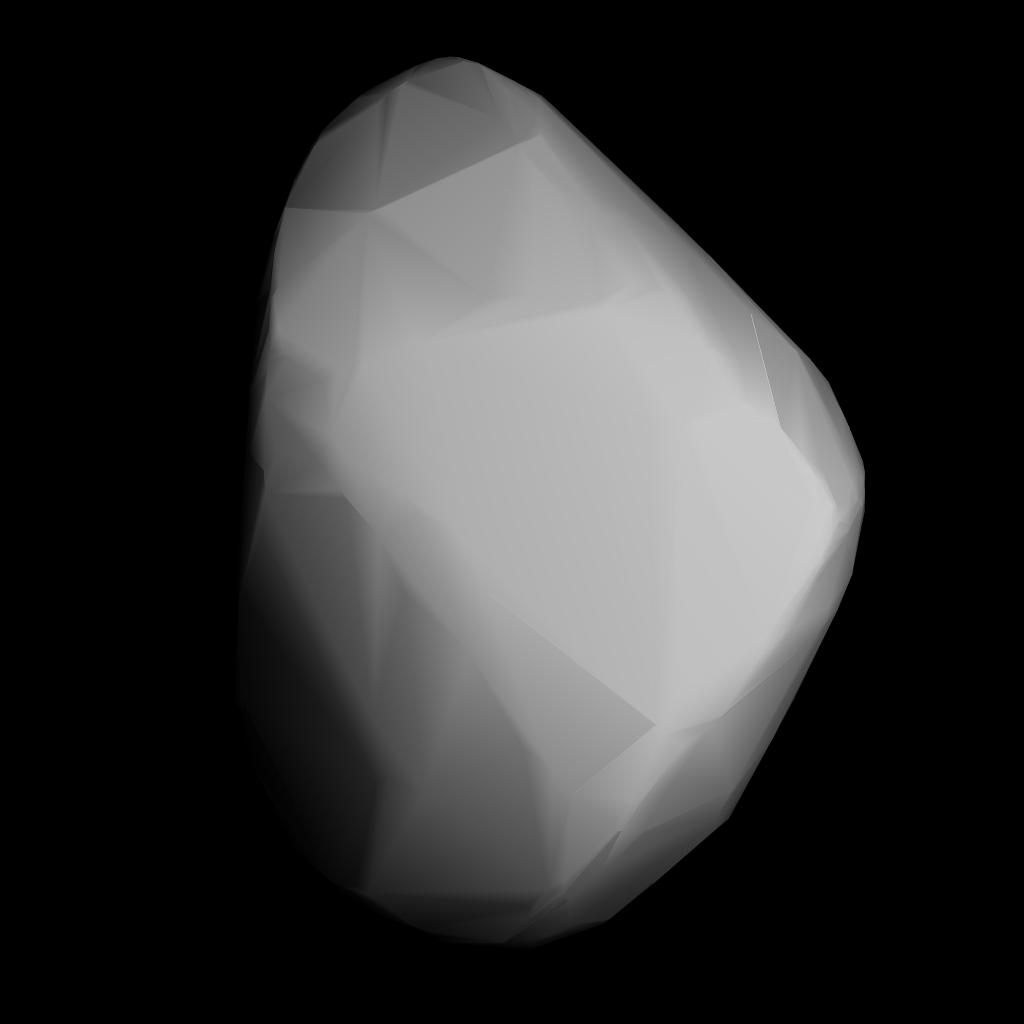

Discovery
- Discovered by: G. Neujmin
- Discovery site: Simeiz Obs.
- Discovery date: 1 July 1933

Designations
- Named after: Konstantin Tsiolkovsky (rocket scientist)
- Alternative designations: 1933 NA · 1933 OU; 1936 HB · 1937 VE; 1940 RN · 1940 RX; 1943 OD · 1950 SF; A907 TB · A913 MC
- Minor planet category: main-belt · Flora

Orbital characteristics
- Epoch 4 September 2017 (JD 2458000.5)
- Uncertainty parameter 0
- Observation arc: 108.90 yr (39,777 days)
- Aphelion: 2.5802 AU
- Perihelion: 1.8807 AU
- Semi-major axis: 2.2305 AU
- Eccentricity: 0.1568
- Orbital period (sidereal): 3.33 yr (1,217 days)
- Mean anomaly: 102.49°
- Mean motion: 0° 17^{m} 45.24^{s} / day
- Inclination: 4.3517°
- Longitude of ascending node: 226.54°
- Argument of perihelion: 52.664°

Physical characteristics
- Dimensions: 9.83±0.40 km 10.300±0.076 km 10.826±0.019 km 12.81±0.27 km 13.27 km 13.32 km (derived)
- Synodic rotation period: 6.7 h 6.7299±0.0005 h 6.731±0.002 h 6.737±0.004 h
- Geometric albedo: 0.2095±0.018; 0.2096 (derived); 0.232±0.012; 0.291±0.036; 0.3260±0.0601; 0.419±0.050
- Spectral type: S
- Absolute magnitude (H): 11.29±0.27 · 11.60 · 11.7

1590 Tsiolkovskaja, provisional designation 1933 NA, is a stony Flora asteroid from the inner regions of the asteroid belt, approximately 11 kilometers in diameter. It was discovered on 1 July 1933, by Soviet–Russian astronomer Grigory Neujmin at Simeiz Observatory, on the Crimean peninsula. It was named for rocket scientist Konstantin Tsiolkovsky.

== Classification and orbit ==
Tsiolkovskaja is a member of the Flora family, a large group of stony S-type asteroids. It orbits the Sun in the inner main-belt at a distance of 1.9–2.6 AU once every 3 years and 4 months (1,217 days). Its orbit has an eccentricity of 0.16 and an inclination of 4° with respect to the ecliptic. Tsiolkovskaja was first observed at Heidelberg Observatory in 1907, extending the body's observation arc by 26 years prior to its discovery observation.

== Physical characteristics ==
Several rotational lightcurves were obtained from photometric observations. They gave a concurring, well-defined rotation period between 6.700 and 6.737 hours with a brightness variation of 0.10–0.40 in magnitude. Tsiolkovskaja has a relatively high albedo in the range of 0.21 to 0.42, according to the surveys carried out by IRAS, Akari, and WISE/NEOWISE, while the Collaborative Asteroid Lightcurve Link derives a moderate albedo of 0.23.

== Naming ==
This minor planet was named in honor of Soviet–Russian rocket scientist Konstantin Tsiolkovsky (1857–1935), considered to be one of the founding fathers of rocketry and astronautics and instrumental to the success of the Soviet space program. The official naming citation was published by the Minor Planet Center on 31 January 1962 (M.P.C. 2116). The lunar crater Tsiolkovskiy is also named after him.
