= Neujmin (crater) =

Lunar crater

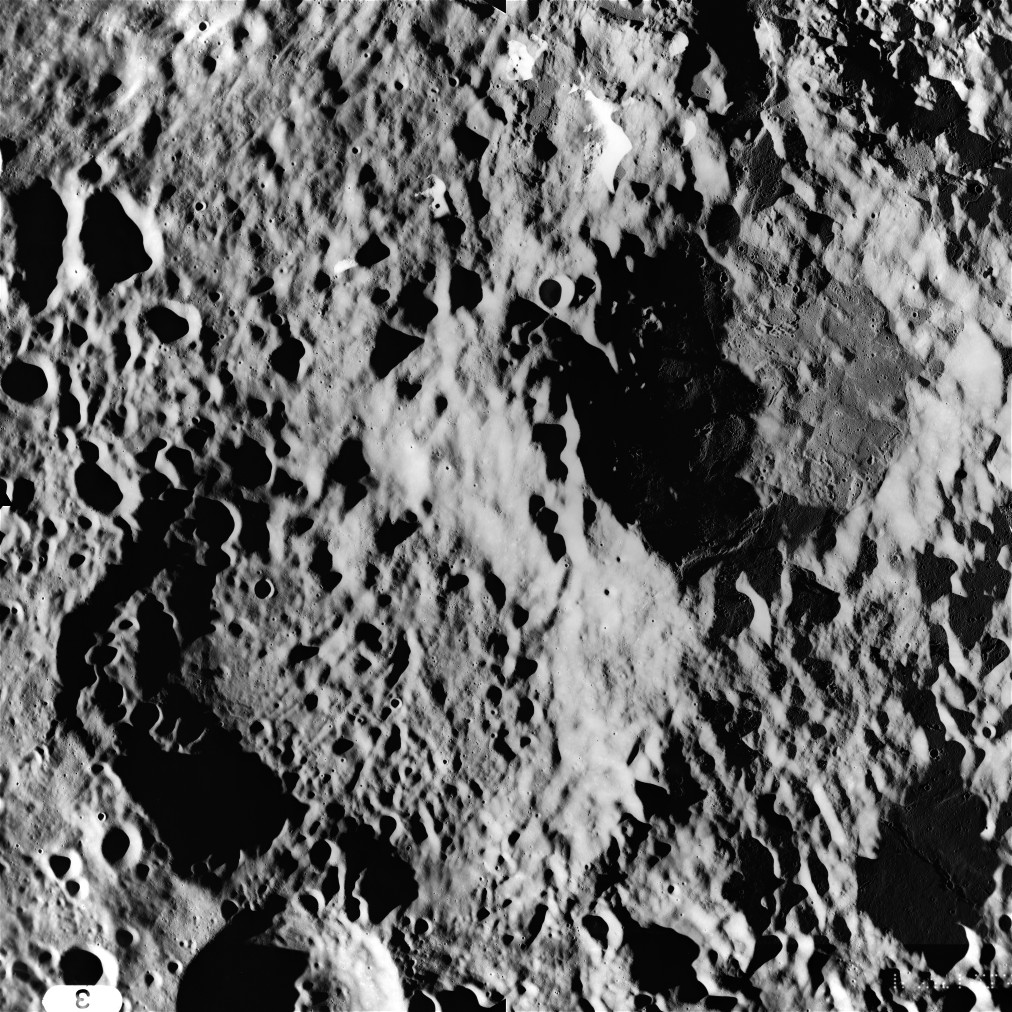
- Neujmin (lower left) and Waterman from Apollo 15. NASA photo.
- Coordinates: 26.68°S 125.17°E
- Diameter: 97.03 km (60.29 mi)
- Depth: 3.5 km (2.2 mi)
- Colongitude: 236° at sunrise
- Eponym: Grigory N. Neujmin

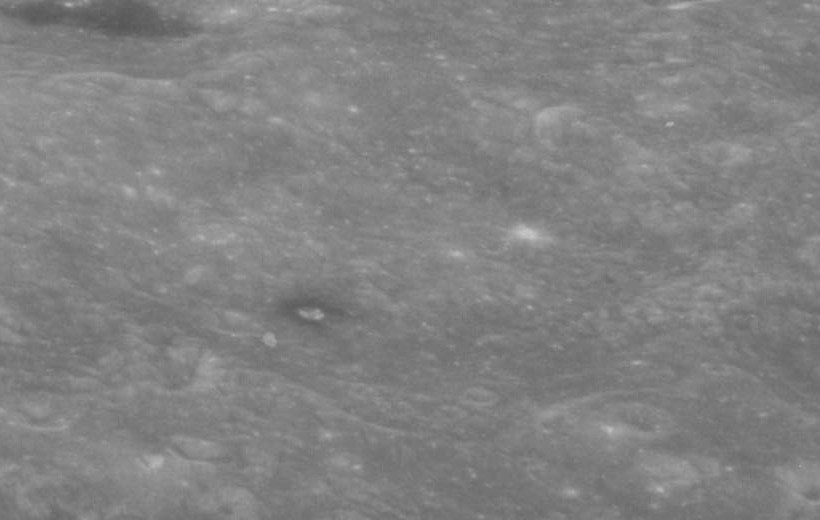
Oblique view facing east with a high sun angle, from Apollo 8, showing the dark-halo crater within.

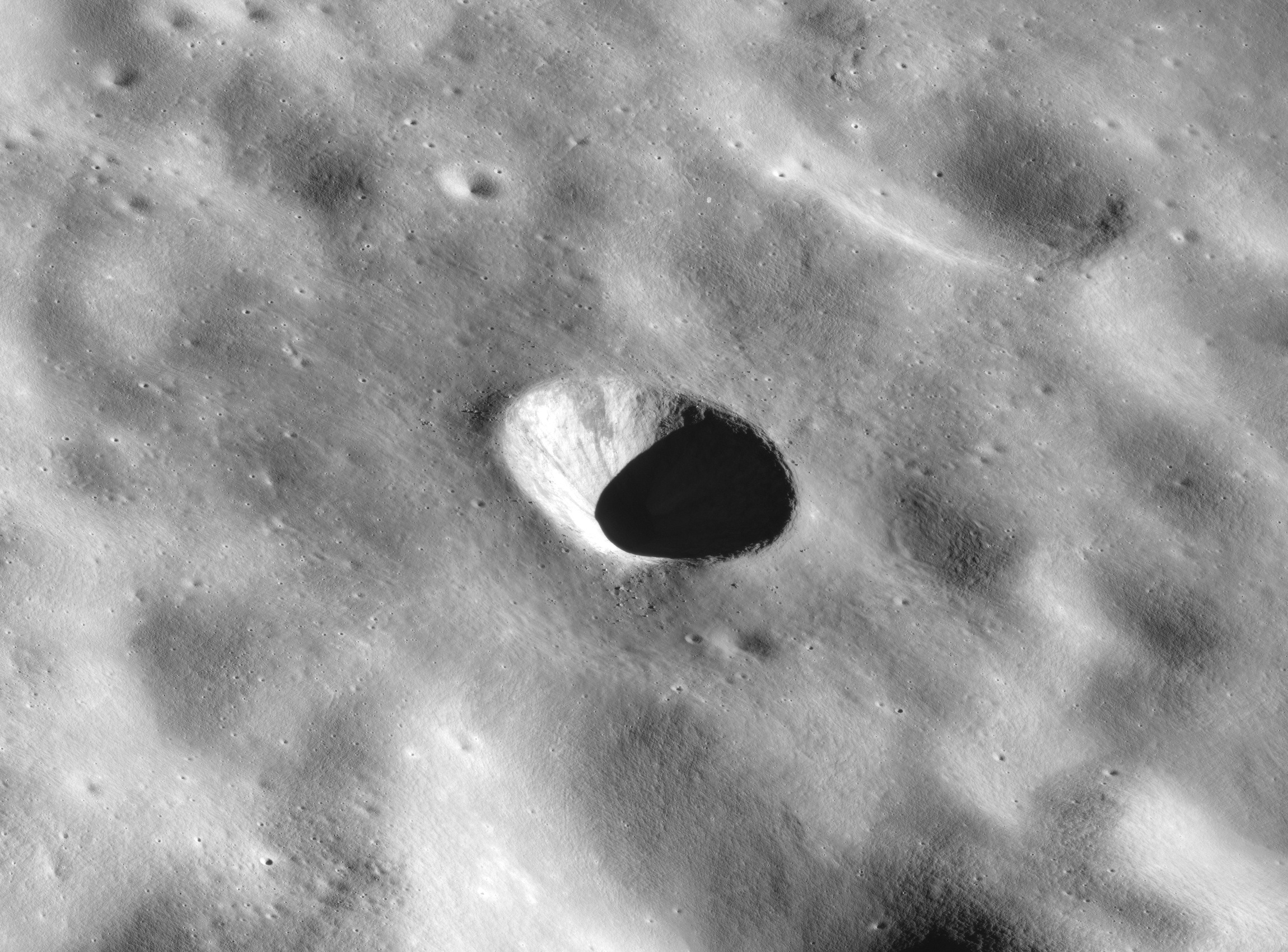
High resolution view of the unnamed dark-halo crater. The halo of dark ejecta itself is visible but not prominent in this photo due to a low sun angle.

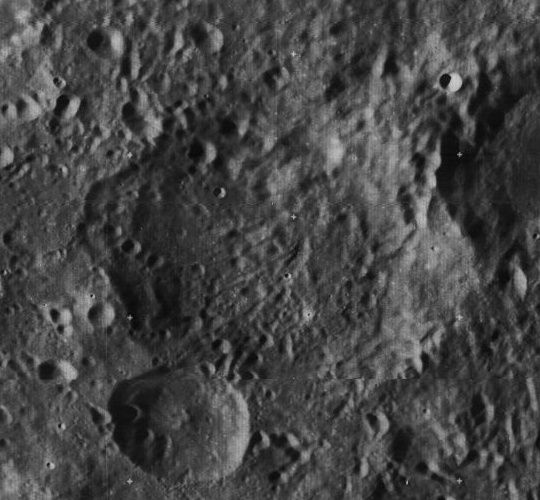
Lunar Orbiter 3 image

Neujmin is a lunar impact crater on the Moon's far side. It is nearly attached to the west-southwest of the smaller crater Waterman, and lies to the southwest of the prominent Tsiolkovskiy.

This is an eroded crater formation that has been somewhat deformed by subsequent impacts. The circular crater Neujmin P lies across the southwestern rim. There are multiple small craterlets along the northwestern rim and inner wall, most likely secondary impacts from Tsiolkovskiy, and both the northern and southern rims are disrupted.

There is a dark-halo crater on the floor of Neujmin, which typically indicates that darker material, such as mare lava, exists below the present surface.

The crater was named after Soviet astronomer Grigory N. Neujmin by the IAU in 1970.

== Satellite craters ==
By convention these features are identified on lunar maps by placing the letter on the side of the crater midpoint that is closest to Neujmin.

Neujmin	Latitude	Longitude	Diameter
P	28.5° S	124.2° E	38 km
Q	30.0° S	121.8° E	17 km
T	27.1° S	122.0° E	24 km

== See also ==
- 1129 Neujmina, asteroid
