= Petőfi (crater) =

Crater on Mercury

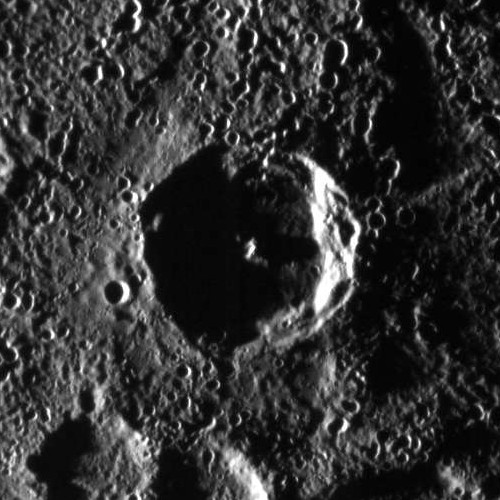
- MESSENGER image
- Planet: Mercury
- Coordinates: 83.55°S 240.65°W
- Quadrangle: Bach
- Diameter: 61 km (38 mi)
- Eponym: Sándor Petőfi

Petőfi is a crater on Mercury, near the south pole. Its name was adopted by the International Astronomical Union in 2013, after the Hungarian poet Sándor Petőfi, following the official convention of naming craters on Mercury after historically significant artists, musicians, painters, and authors.

The northern floor of Petőfi is in permanent shadow.
