= Eötvös (crater) =

Crater on the Moon

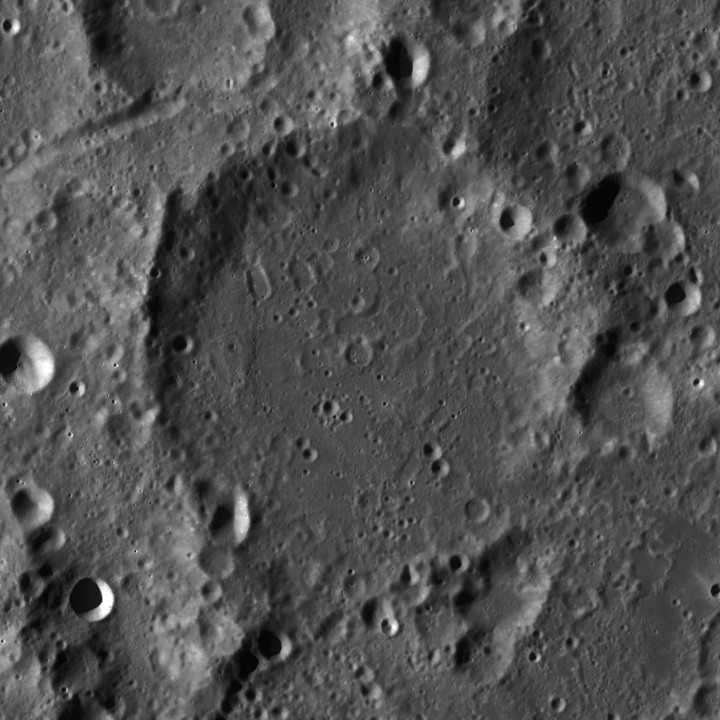
- LRO WAC image
- Coordinates: 35.5°S 133.8°E
- Diameter: 101.80 km (63.26 mi)
- Depth: Unknown
- Colongitude: 227° at sunrise
- Eponym: Loránd Eötvös

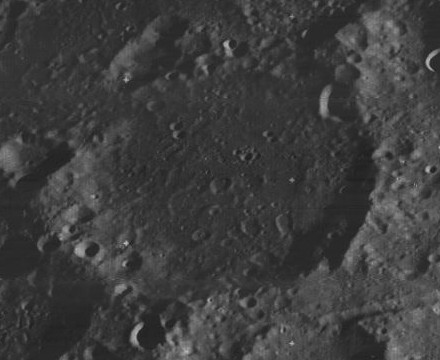
Oblique view from Lunar Orbiter 3, facing south

Eötvös is the remains of a lunar impact crater on the far side of the Moon. It lies to the north-northwest of a walled plain named Roche, and east-southeast of the equally ruined Bolyai. There are small maria between Eötvös and Roche.

Only the northwestern section of the crater's rim survives, the remainder now forming a battered, uneven circular rise. The rim is nearly non-existent along the southeast where it joins an uneven plain reaching the rim of Roche. Small craters lie along the rim to the northeast and one to the southwest. The interior floor is relatively level, but marked by a number of small craterlets as well as palimpsests, meaning circular rises in the surface that are now scarcely recognizable as craters.

This formation is named after Hungarian physicist Loránd (Roland) Eötvös (1848-1919). Its designation was formally adopted by the International Astronomical Union in 1970.

== Satellite craters ==
By convention these features are identified on Lunar maps by placing the letter on the side of the crater midpoint that is closest to Eötvös.

Eötvös	Latitude	Longitude	Diameter
B	33.0° S	134.8° E	22 km
D	34.4° S	136.1° E	16 km
E	34.5° S	138.1° E	23 km
F	35.8° S	136.2° E	21 km
T	35.3° S	130.8° E	15 km
