= John Martin Schaeberle =

German-American astronomer (1853-1924)

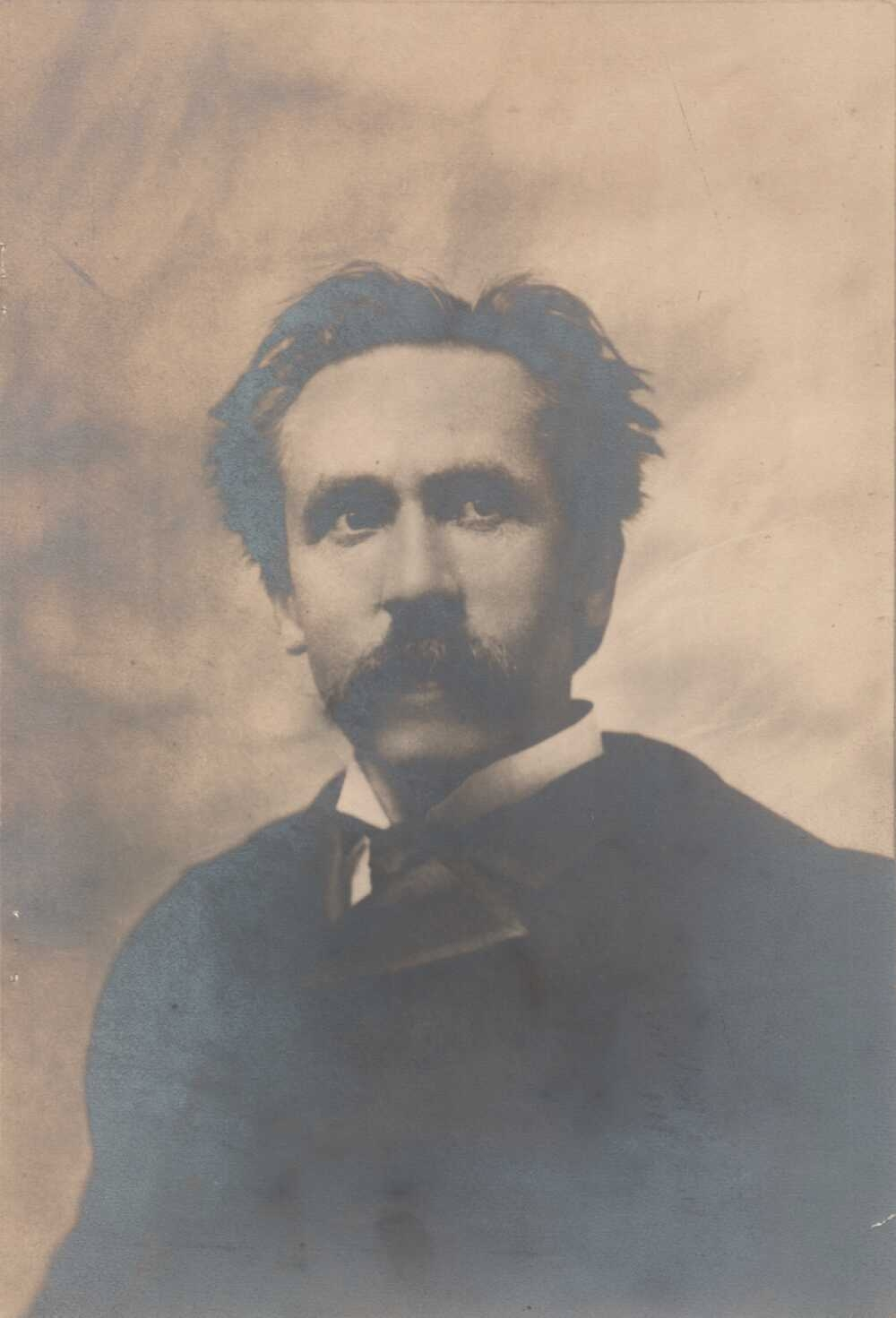
John Martin Schaeberle

John Martin Schaeberle (January 10, 1853 – September 17, 1924) was a German-American astronomer.

== Biography ==
He was born Johann Martin Schäberle in the Kingdom of Württemberg, German Confederation, but in 1854 was brought as an infant to the United States. Most sources refer to him as John M. Schaeberle, but his family and friends called him Martin.

He attended public schools, and then became an apprentice in a machine shop. During his apprenticeship, he became interested in astronomy, and decided to finish high school. He then became a student of James Craig Watson at the University of Michigan. He graduated from the University of Michigan in 1876 as a civil engineer, but devoted himself to astronomy. He taught astronomy at the University of Michigan from 1876 to 1888. He maintained his own private observatory and discovered three comets. In 1888 he became one of the inaugural astronomers at Lick Observatory.

He had charge of the expedition to witness the solar eclipse at Cayenne in 1889, and of those for the same purpose to Chile in 1893, and to Japan in 1896. He designed the "Schaeberle camera" to take pictures of the Sun and its corona during total solar eclipses. He also discovered Procyon B, the faint companion star of Procyon, in 1896.

He resigned from Lick Observatory when James E. Keeler was made its director instead of him in 1898, despite the fact that he had been acting director since the previous year. He devoted some time to travel, and then continued astronomical studies in Ann Arbor. He never held another astronomical post. He was also an athlete and musician. He was a frequent contributor to astronomical journals.

Schaeberle died in Ann Arbor. There are craters named after him on both the Moon and on Mars.

== Comets discovered ==
- C/1880 G1 (Schaeberle)
- C/1881 N1 (Schaeberle)
