= Tsiolkovskiy Island =

Tsiolkovskiy Island (70°30′S 3°0′E) is an ice-covered island in the Fimbul Ice Shelf, Queen Maud Land. The summit of the island rises about 200 m above the general level of the ice shelf. Kroshka Island lies close southwest and is similar but smaller. First mapped by the Soviet Antarctic Expedition in 1961 and named for Konstantin Eduardovich Tsiolkovsky (1857–1935), Russian scientist and inventor.

== See also ==
- List of antarctic and sub-antarctic islands
