= Imre Izsák =

Imre Gyula Izsák (Zalaegerszeg, Hungary, February 21, 1929 – Paris, France, April 21, 1965) was a Hungarian mathematician, physicist, astronomer, and celestial mechanician. His father, Gyula Izsák, taught geography and biology in Zalaegerszeg. His mother, Aranka Pálfi, was a mathematics and physics teacher.

== Education ==
Izsák received his basic schooling in Zalaegerszeg. After his mother's early death, he continued his studies at the Lower Real School in Kőszeg, where he was particularly influenced by his geography and science teacher, Szilárd Zerinváry, who later gained national fame with his writings on astronomy and the stars.

Because of his outstanding mathematical abilities, Izsák was sent on to study at the Artúr Görgey Military Cadet Engineering School in Esztergom. Near the end of the Second World War, his entire class of military cadets was taken to Germany, where he became a prisoner of war.

On his return to his native town from a prisoner-of-war camp in the fall of 1945, he enrolled in the 6th grade of Ferenc Deák High School (now Miklós Zrínyi High School). The following year, he simultaneously completed 7th and 8th grade with outstanding results and ranked 1st and 2nd in national mathematics competitions.

He earned his college degree in mathematics and physics at the Loránd Eötvös University of Arts and Sciences in Budapest. While there, he was a resident of Eötvös College, a residential college for elite students of the university. During his second year he published a paper that resulted in controversy, as some could not believe that such a paper on differential geometry had been written by a young student. Attending lectures by István Földes raised his interest in celestial mechanics. During his college years, he was an assistant at the observatory founded by Miklós Konkoly-Thege. He continued working there after earning his degree in the summer of 1951. In the observatory, he worked under the supervision of László Detre and Júlia Balázs and started working on his advanced degree at the age of 22.

In 1953 he joined the Szabadsághegyi Observatory. He later taught at the University of Arts and Sciences in Szeged.

== Celestial mechanics ==
Izsák was interested in the three-body problem and the n-body problem. He studied the light emissions of quasars. After defending his doctorate and ignoring the prevailing wisdom that celestial mechanics was a resolved field, he returned to his favorite topic and started working on the trajectories of rockets and satellites. Putting his work into practice would have been possible only in the Soviet Union or the USA; international connections in Hungary at that time were limited to the occasional conference in the Soviet Union. Therefore, in November 1956, during the Hungarian revolution, he took advantage of the open borders and emigrated to Austria.

Soon after, he traveled to Switzerland, where the director of the Zürich Observatory offered him a position. He arrived in Zürich on January 9, 1957. By April, he was a full-time researcher at the institute for solar physics. Besides his research, he taught celestial navigation and time measurement to college students. He started learning English and became part of the international scientific community. His results on computing satellite orbits earned him an invitation to Cincinnati, Ohio. Soon he became one of the most respected authorities on the topic. He got a new offer for a position at the Smithsonian Astrophysical Observatory in Cambridge, Massachusetts. This was the primary institute for processing the orbital data of U.S. satellites. The work he started in Cambridge in 1959 led to his greatest successes. He had access to computers, which he needed to carry out much more precise computations than previously. The pace of the work was intense. He and his collaborators published one paper after another and extended their work to the geodesic applications of satellites.

The ultimate goal of his computations was the determination of the precise shape of the Earth, which had long been known to be approximately an ellipsoid of revolution. He used observations of satellite orbits to compute deviations from this shape. The classic problem of celestial mechanics is to compute the orbit of a moon, given a known distribution of mass. He solved the inverse problem. He used harmonic approximation in his computations, i.e. he reconstructed the Earth's gravitational field from monopoles, dipoles, quadrupoles, etc. The shape indicated by such a computation may not match the shape of the Earth exactly, but it has exactly the same gravitational field. Izsák found that the shape of the equator was not a precise circle, but deviated from one by about 400 meters. This result was magnitudes better than any previous approximation.

On June 1, 1961, he officially announced his computations of the shape of the Earth and its surface. They brought him to the center of scientific attention and rapidly earned him international fame. He received frequent invitations and gave lectures all over the world. He continued to work hard, agreeing to write a college textbook on the motions of satellites while lecturing at Harvard University. As an acknowledgment his accomplishments, he was made a chief scientist at NASA.

Izsák was married on June 7, 1962, to Emily Kuempel Brady, a teacher of English literature at Boston University. He became a US citizen on February 24, 1964. That fall, his son Andrew was born.

In 1965, he traveled to a conference on satellite-geodesics in Paris, where he died of a heart attack in his hotel room on April 21, 1965, at the age of 36. He was buried in Cambridge, Massachusetts, on April 28.

== Honors ==
- Izsák Crater on the Moon, 23.3 degrees south, 117.1 degrees east. (To the west of the Tsiolkovsky and Fermi double craters on the other side of the moon).
- The asteroid 1546 Izsák, discovered by György Kulin was named in his honor.
- The Imre Gyula Izsák Astrophysics Institute of the Loránd Eötvös University of Arts and Sciences in Budapest has been named after him since 2007.
