= 1546 Izsák =

Background asteroid

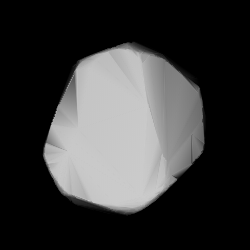
- Shape model of Izsák from its lightcurve

Discovery
- Discovered by: G. Kulin
- Discovery site: Konkoly Obs.
- Discovery date: 28 September 1941

Designations
- Named after: Imre Izsák (Hungarian astronomer)
- Alternative designations: 1941 SG_{1} · 1935 QC; 1938 FH · 1978 BF
- Minor planet category: main-belt · (outer) background

Orbital characteristics
- Epoch 4 September 2017 (JD 2458000.5)
- Uncertainty parameter 0
- Observation arc: 81.86 yr (29,898 days)
- Aphelion: 3.5686 AU
- Perihelion: 2.7886 AU
- Semi-major axis: 3.1786 AU
- Eccentricity: 0.1227
- Orbital period (sidereal): 5.67 yr (2,070 days)
- Mean anomaly: 77.417°
- Mean motion: 0° 10^{m} 26.04^{s} / day
- Inclination: 16.138°
- Longitude of ascending node: 190.47°
- Argument of perihelion: 280.94°

Physical characteristics
- Mean diameter: 19.31±0.85 km 26.08±1.45 km 26.438±0.139 km 28.487±0.110 km 42.23 km (calculated)
- Synodic rotation period: 7.33200±0.00005 h 7.350±0.006 h (Note: Lightcurve plot of 1546 Izsák, Palmer Divide Observatory, Brian D. Warner (2006). Summary figures at the LCDB)
- Geometric albedo: 0.057 (assumed); 0.1153±0.0139; 0.133±0.011; 0.149±0.018; 0.249±0.029
- Spectral type: X · M · C
- Absolute magnitude (H): 10.60 · 10.68±0.37 · 10.70

1546 Izsák (provisional designation 1941 SG_{1}) is a background asteroid from the outer regions of the asteroid belt, approximately 27 kilometers in diameter. It was discovered on 28 September 1941, by Hungarian astronomer György Kulin at the Konkoly Observatory near Budapest, Hungary. The asteroid was named after Hungarian astronomer Imre Izsák.

== Orbit and classification ==
Izsák is a non-family asteroid from the main belt's background population. It orbits the Sun in the outer asteroid belt at a distance of 2.8–3.6 AU once every 5 years and 8 months (2,070 days). Its orbit has an eccentricity of 0.12 and an inclination of 16° with respect to the ecliptic.

The body's observation arc begins with its identification as 1935 QC at Simeiz Observatory in August 1935, more than 6 years prior to its official discovery observation at Konkoly.

== Naming ==
This minor planet was named in memory of Imre Izsák (1929–1965), a Hungarian-born astronomer and celestial mechanician, who studied the motion of artificial satellites. He also worked at the Cincinnati Observatory and the Smithsonian Astrophysical Observatory in the United States. The official naming citation was published by the Minor Planet Center on 1 February 1980 (M.P.C. 5182). He is also honored by a lunar crater Izsak.

== Physical characteristics ==
Izsák has been characterized as a generic X-, a metallic M- and a carbonaceous C-type asteroid, by PanSTARRS photometric survey, by the Wide-field Infrared Survey Explorer (WISE) and by the Lightcurve Data Base, respectively.

=== Rotation period ===
In April 2006, a rotational lightcurve of Izsák was obtained from photometric observations by American astronomer Brian Warner at his Palmer Divide Observatory in Colorado (716). Lightcurve analysis gave a well-defined rotation period of 7.350 hours with a brightness amplitude of 0.31 magnitude (U=3).

=== Poles ===
In 2016, a modeled lightcurve gave a concurring period of 7.33200 hours and determined two spin axis of (124.0°, 32.0°) and (322.0°, 60.0°) in ecliptic coordinates (λ, β).

=== Diameter and albedo ===
According to the surveys carried out by the Japanese Akari satellite and the NEOWISE mission of NASA's WISE telescope, Izsák measures between 19.31 and 28.487 kilometers in diameter and its surface has an albedo between 0.1153 and 0.249.

The Collaborative Asteroid Lightcurve Link assumes a standard albedo for carbonaceous asteroids of 0.057 and calculates a diameter of 42.23 kilometers based on an absolute magnitude of 10.6.
