= Fermi (crater) =

Crater on the Moon

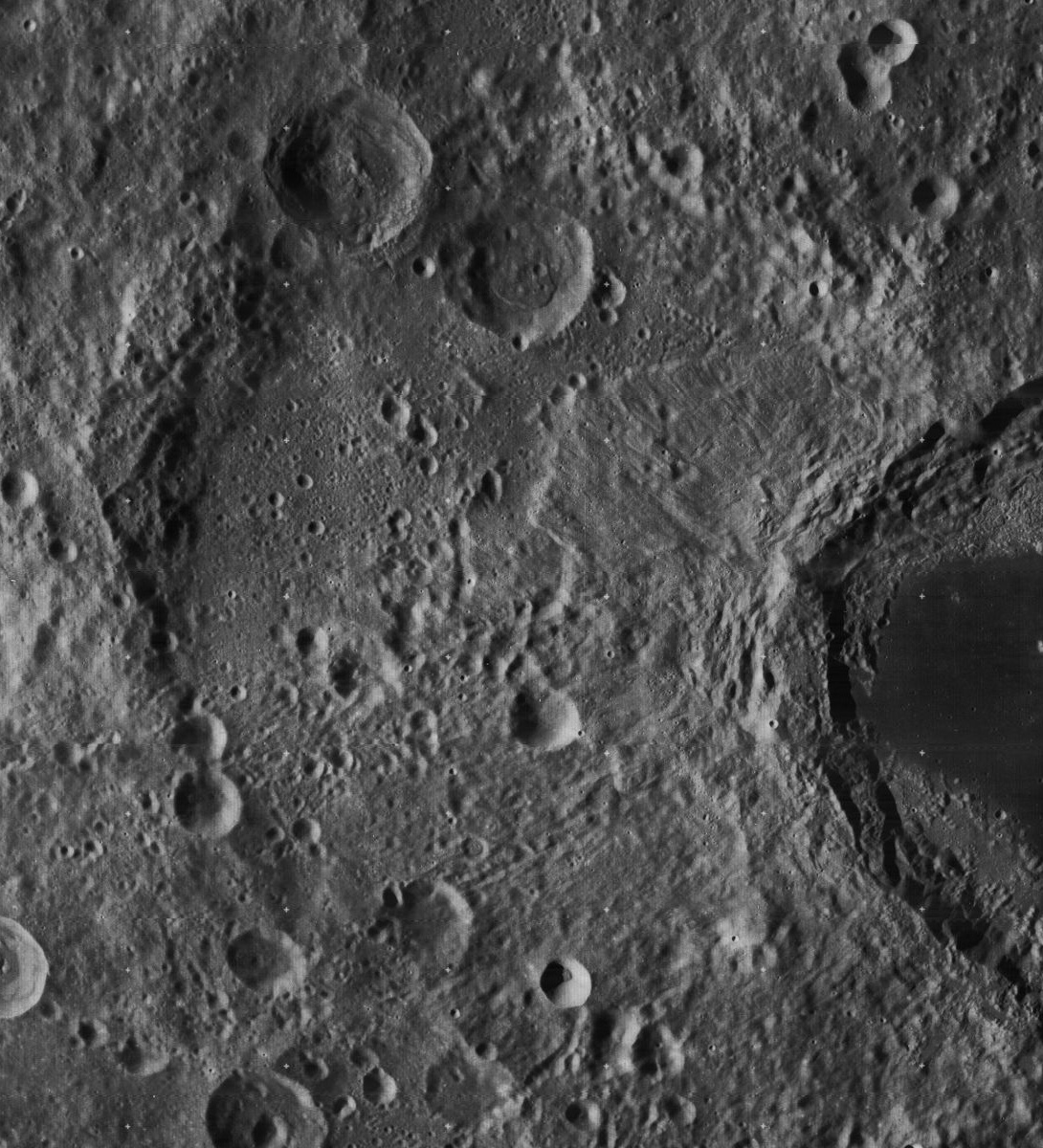
- Lunar Orbiter 3 image
- Coordinates: 19.61°S 123.24°E
- Diameter: 241.41 km (150.01 mi)
- Depth: 5.5 km (3.4 mi)
- Colongitude: 240° at sunrise
- Formation: Pre-Nectarian
- Eponym: Enrico Fermi

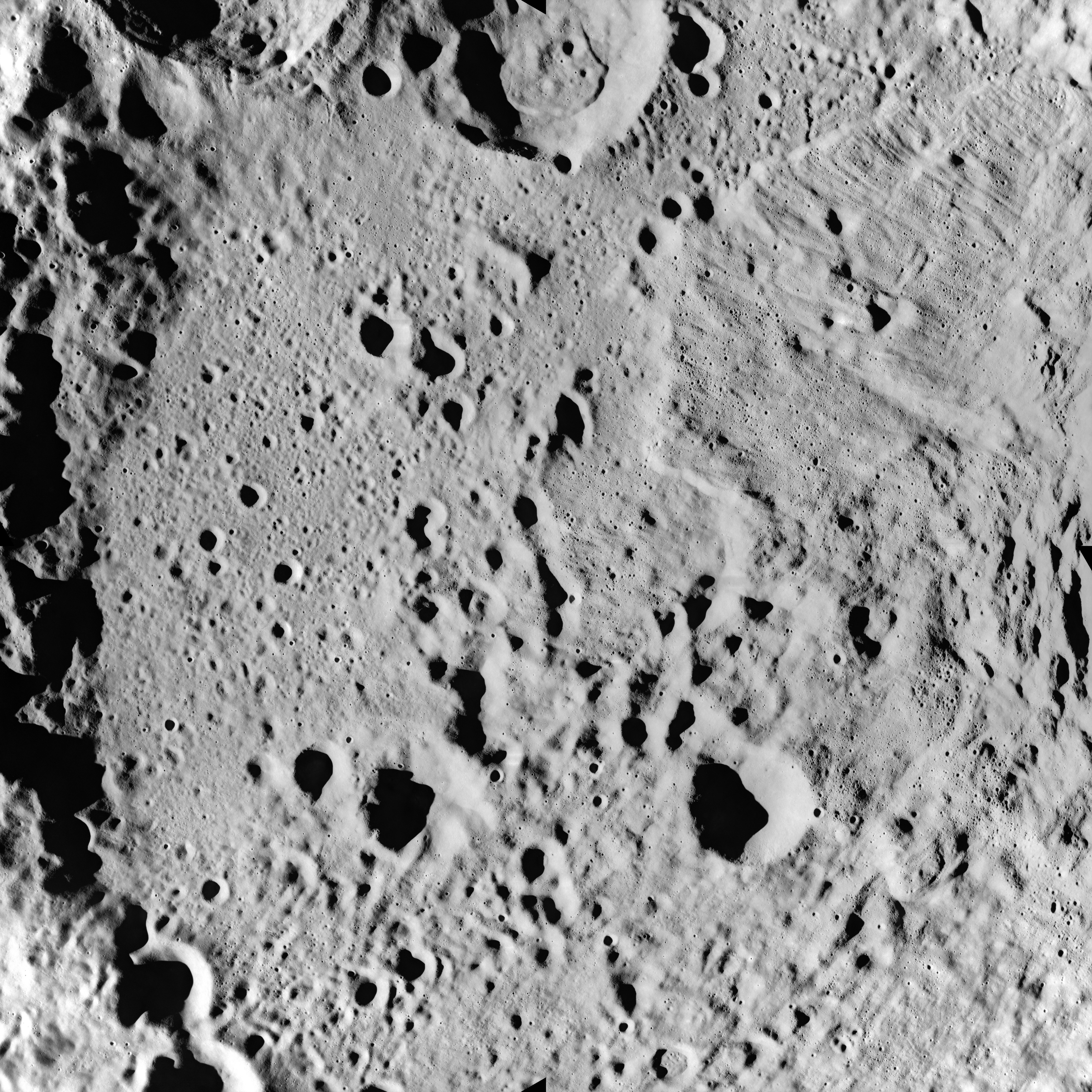
Apollo 17 mapping camera image of the interior

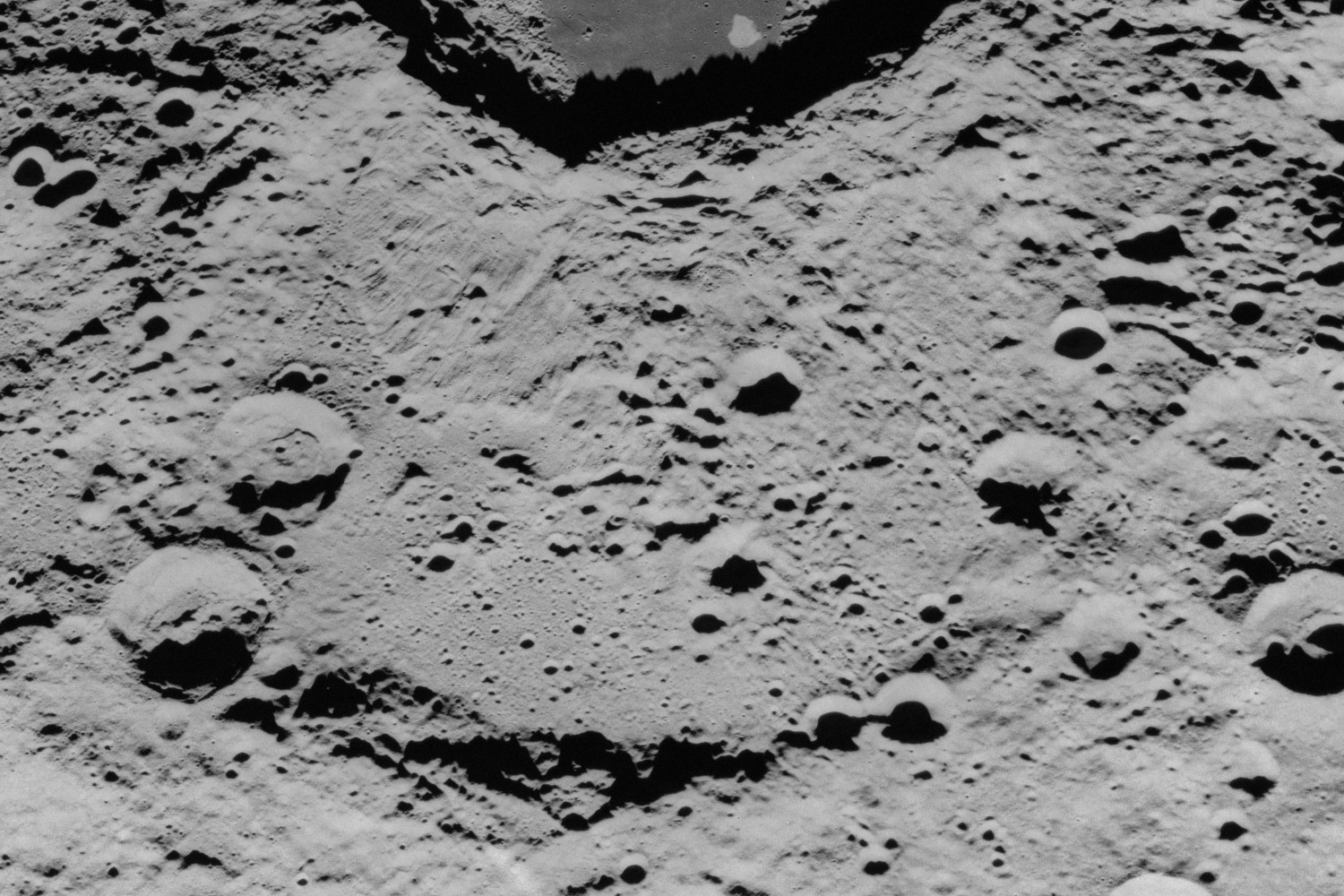
Oblique Apollo 17 image, facing east

Fermi is a large lunar impact crater of the category named a walled plain. It lies on the far side of the Moon and can not be viewed from the Earth. Thus this feature must be viewed from an orbiting spacecraft.

The most notable aspect of Fermi is that the large and prominent crater Tsiolkovskiy intrudes into its southeastern rim. Unlike Tsiolkovskiy, however, the interior of Fermi is not covered by dark basaltic lava, and so it is barely distinguishable from the surrounding rugged and battered terrain. If it were located on the near side of the Moon, however, this would be one of the largest visible craters, with a dimension roughly equal to the crater Humboldt, lying several hundred kilometers to the west-southwest.

This formation dates to the Pre-Nectarian period of the lunar geologic timescale. The infrared spectrum of pure crystalline plagioclase has been identified on the northwest floor. The crater has been significantly eroded and damaged by subsequent impacts, and several notable craters lie across the rim and within the basin. Delporte is the most notable of these, lying across the northwest rim. Just to the east and inside the northern rim of Fermi is Litke. The smaller crater Xenophon is centered across the southern rim. In the southern half of the floor are the craters Diderot and Babakin.

The rim, where it survives, is the most intact along the northern half. The southern half of the rim has been nearly obliterated, forming an irregular stretch of ground. The interior floor of Fermi has been modified by the creation of Tsiolkovskiy and the subsequent collapse of its western rim, with striations in the northeastern floor of Fermi, and parallel ridges along the western rim of Tsiolkovskiy. The remaining sections of the floor is somewhat more level, although pock-marked by myriads of tiny craterlets. The central section of the floor in particular has several clustered crater formations.

Previously identified as Basin V, this crater was named after Italian-American physicist Enrico Fermi (1901–1954), a Nobel laureate in 1938. Its designation was formally adopted by the International Astronomical Union in 1970.
