= Tsiolkovskiy (crater) =

Lunar impact crater

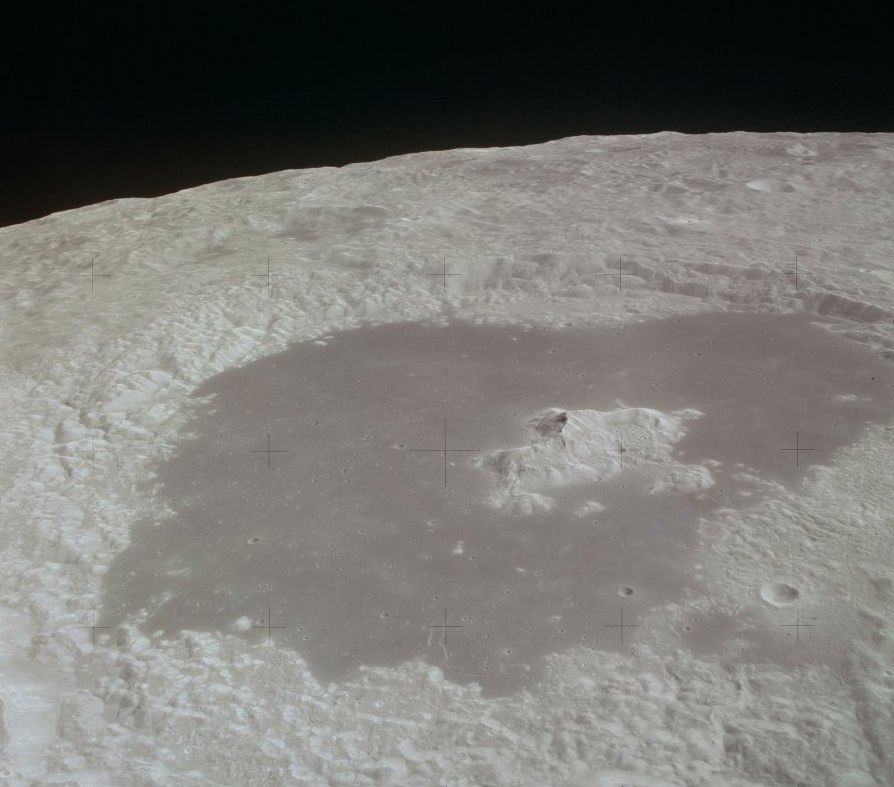
- Tsiolkovskiy on the Moon's far side from Apollo 15 showing the central peak. NASA photo.
- Coordinates: 20.38°S 128.97°E
- Diameter: 184.39 km (114.57 mi)
- Depth: 5.2 km (3.2 mi)
- Colongitude: 235° at sunrise
- Eponym: Konstantin Tsiolkovsky

Tsiolkovskiy is a large lunar impact crater that is located on the far side of the Moon. Named for Russian scientist Konstantin Tsiolkovsky, it lies in the southern hemisphere, to the west of the large crater Gagarin, and northwest of Milne. Just to the south is Waterman, with Neujmin to the south-southwest. The crater protrudes into the neighbouring Fermi, an older crater of comparable size that does not have a lava-flooded floor.

Tsiolkovskiy has been considered one of the largest craters of the Upper (Late) Imbrian age, although that dating was revised to the Imbrian/Eratosthenian boundary in 2013. A number of sites on its walls and central peak have slopes over 45°, leading some to propose a Late Eratosthenian dating.

== Characteristics ==
Tsiolkovskiy is one of the most prominent features on the far side of the Moon. It possesses high, terraced inner walls and a well-formed central peak, which rises over 3200 m above the floor of the crater. The floor is unusual for a crater on the far side, as it is covered by the dark-hued mare that is characteristic of the maria found on the near side. The distribution of the mare material is not symmetrical across the floor, but is instead more heavily concentrated to the east and south. There is also a protruding bay of darker material that reaches the wall to the west-northwest. The remainder of the floor has the same albedo as the terrain surrounding the crater.

The infrared spectrum of pure crystalline plagioclase has been identified in this formation. The crater has an unusually high rockfall density for its diameter, although this does not apply to its northwest rim.

A row of small craters in Mendeleev crater far to the northeast is called Catena Mendeleev, and the row points directly at Tsiolkovsky. For this reason the craters are believed to be secondaries from the Tsiolkovsky impact.

This feature was discovered on photographs sent back by the Russian spacecraft Luna 3, and was subsequently imaged by several of the American Lunar Orbiters and then by Apollo astronauts.

Apollo 17 Astronaut Harrison "Jack" Schmitt and other scientists (Schmitt was the only trained scientist, a geologist, to walk on the Moon) strongly advocated Tsiolkovskiy as the landing site of Apollo 17, using small communications satellites deployed from the Command/Service Module for communication from the far side of the Moon. NASA vetoed the idea as too risky, and Apollo 17 instead landed in the Taurus–Littrow valley on December 11, 1972.

== Views ==
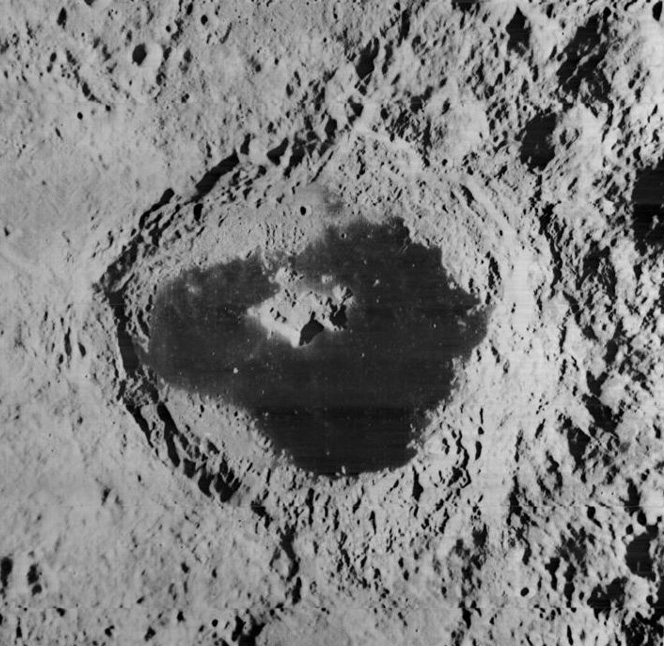
Lunar Orbiter 1 image

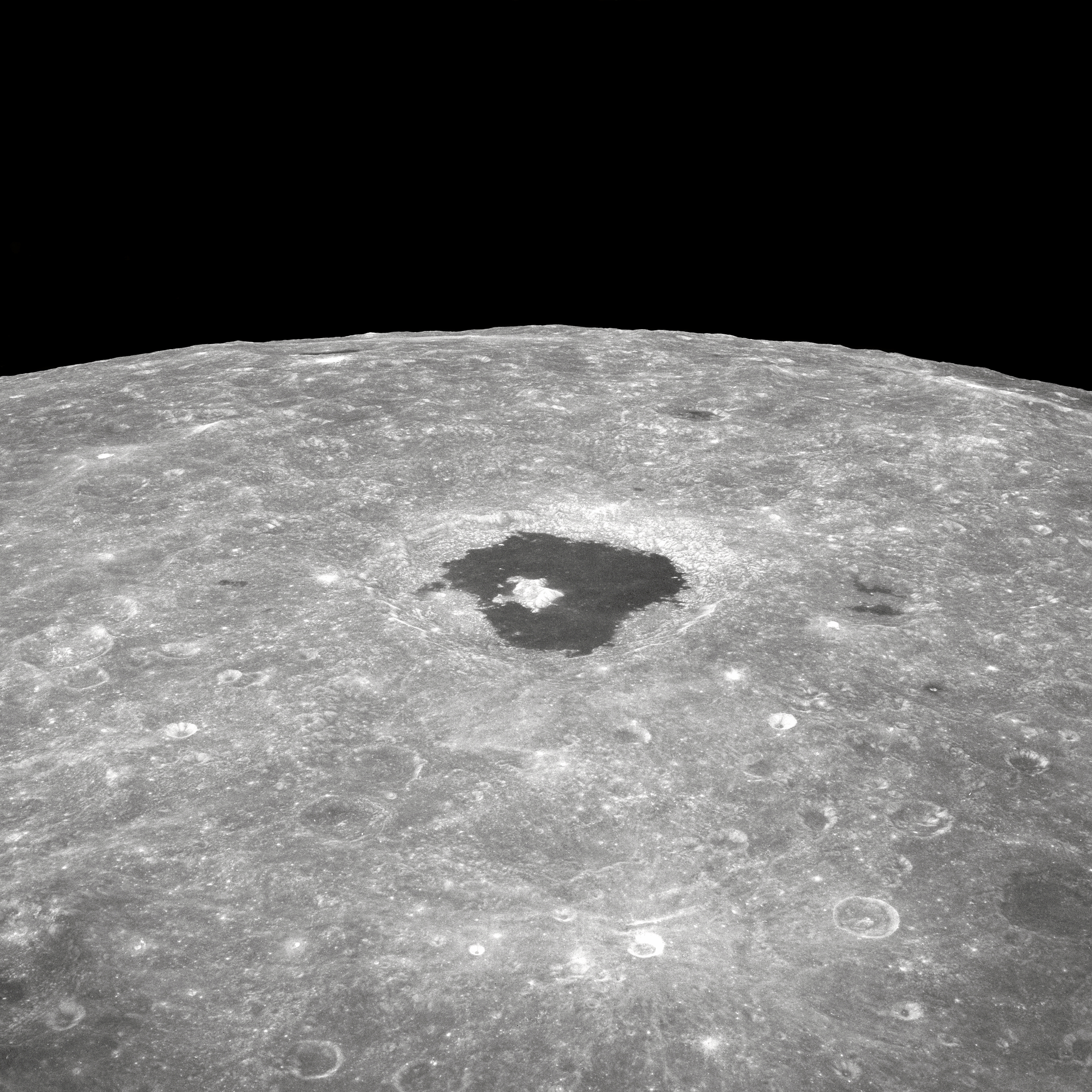
Apollo 8 image

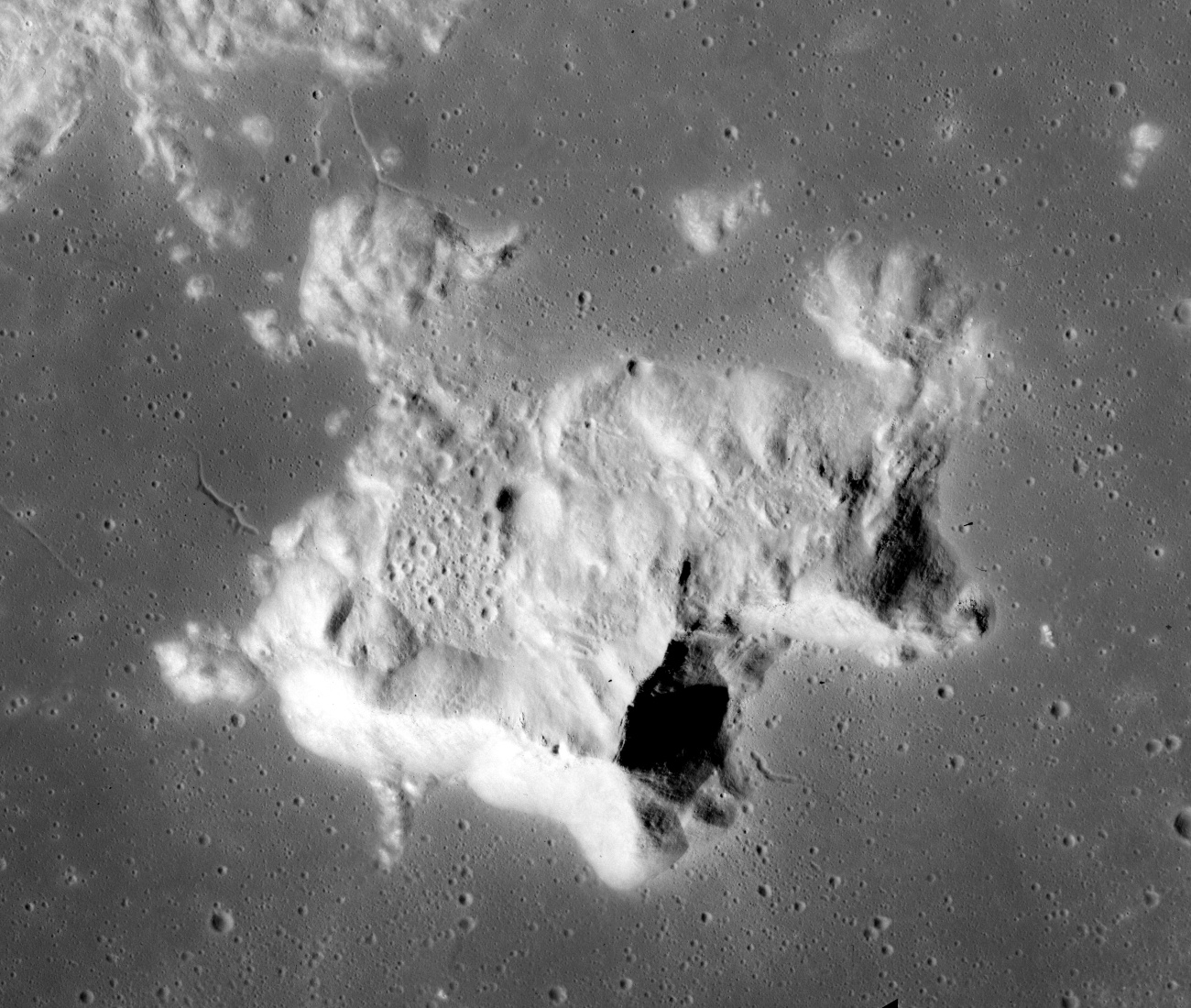
Apollo 15 mapping camera image of the central peak

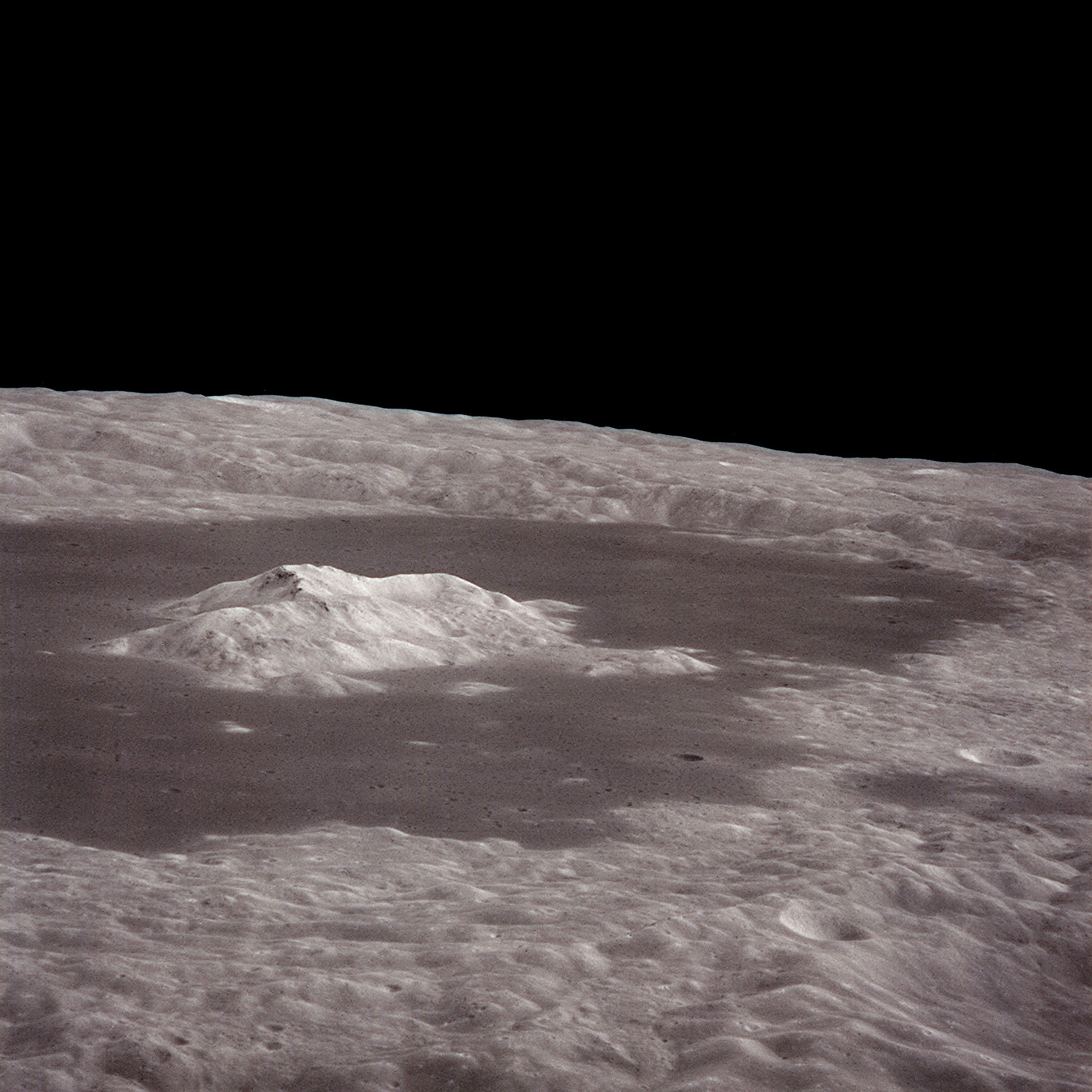
Another oblique view from Apollo 15

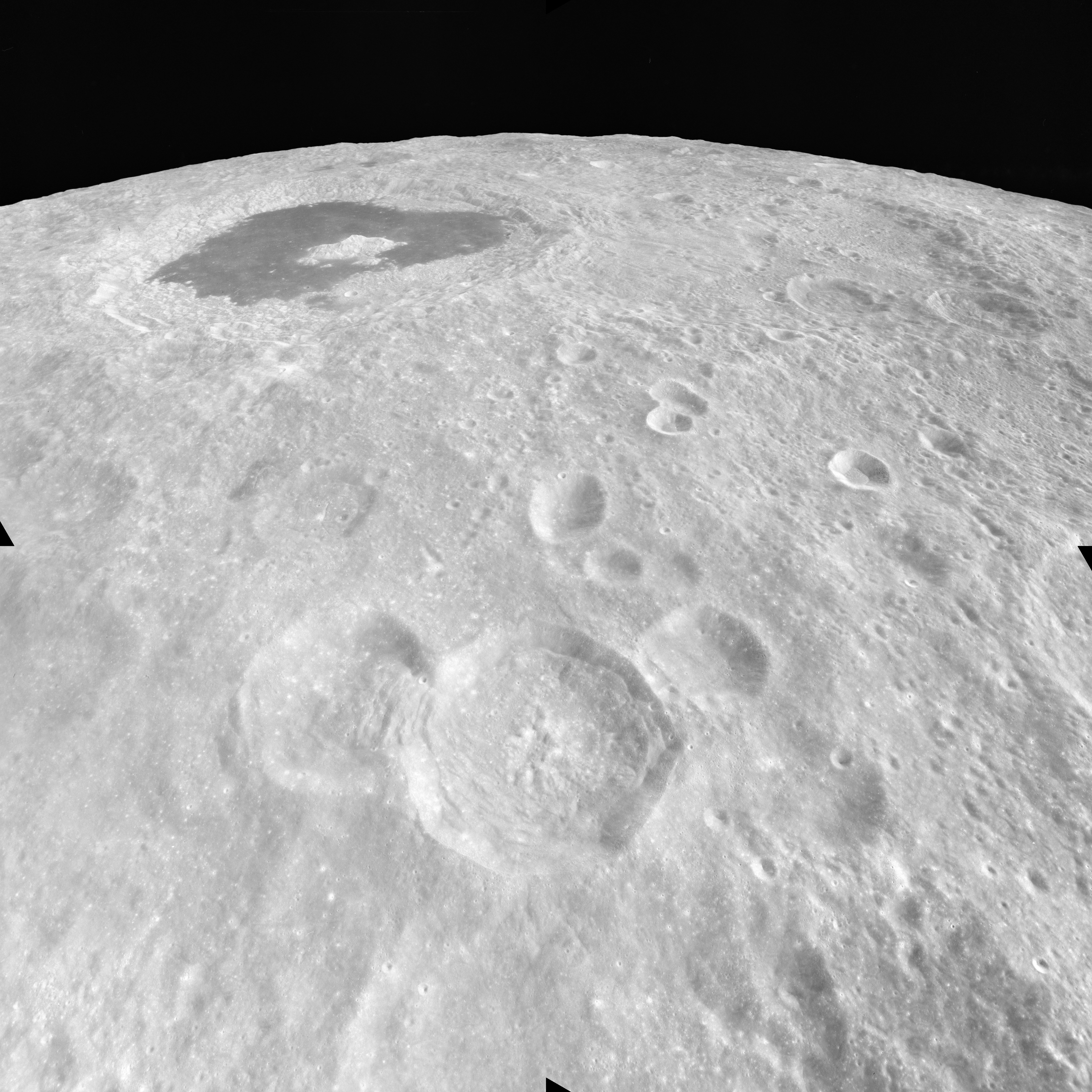
Oblique view from Apollo 17, facing south

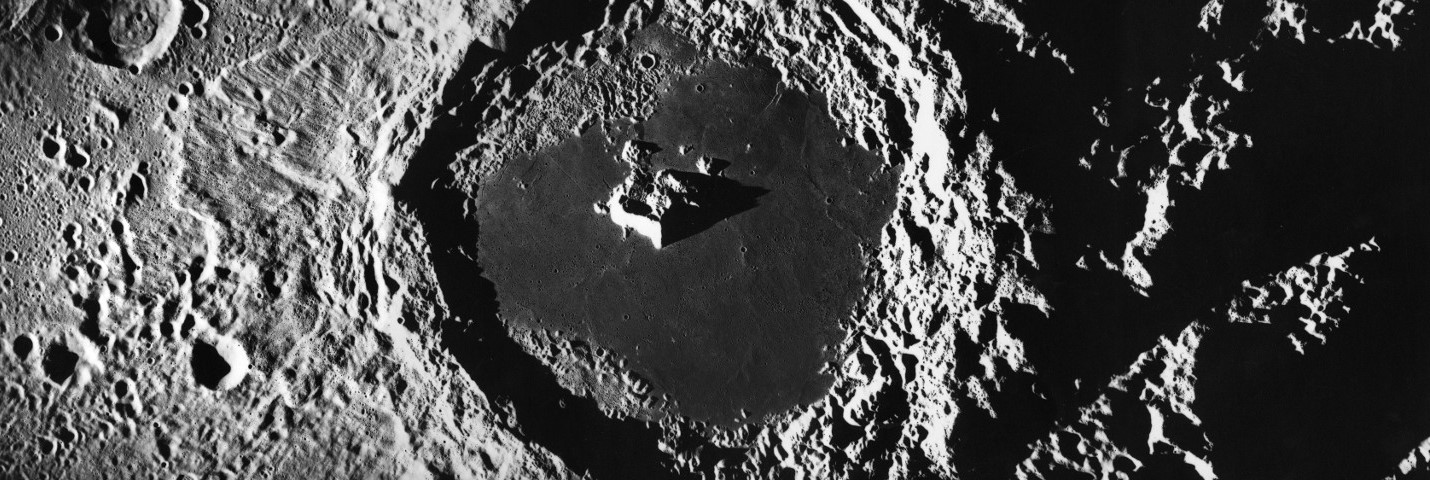
Mosaic of Apollo 17 mapping camera images, while Tsiolkovskiy was at the terminator

== Satellite craters ==
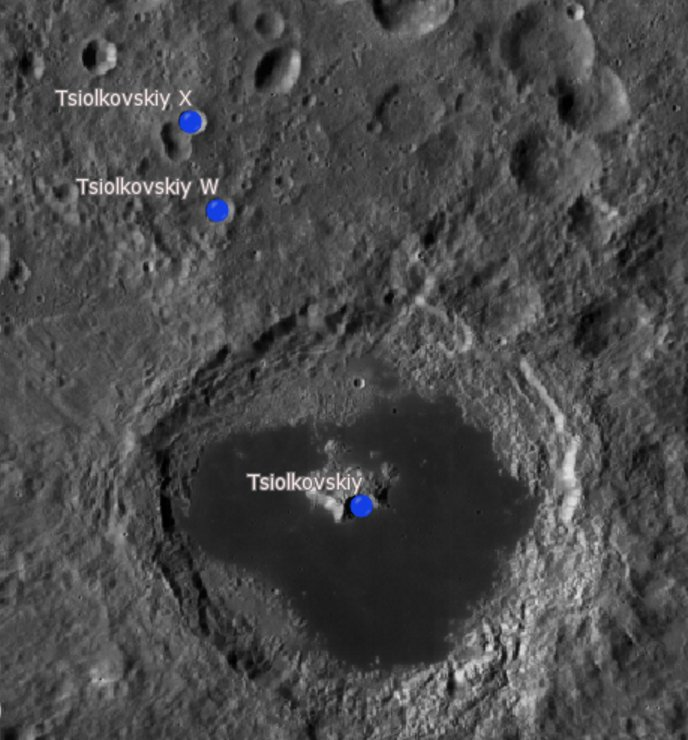
Map

By convention these features are identified on lunar maps by placing the letter on the side of the crater midpoint that is closest to Tsiolkovskiy.

The name Chenier was proposed for a crater to the northeast of Tsiolkovskiy and southwest of Patsaev, but the name was not approved by the IAU. It is now called Patsaev Q.

Tsiolkovskiy	Coordinates	Diameter, km
W	16.04°S 126.87°E	12.1
X	14.72°S 126.47°E	12.1

== In popular culture ==
- Tchalinko Base, the site of a Soviet lunar administrative facility in the movie 2001: A Space Odyssey

== See also ==
- 1590 Tsiolkovskaja, asteroid
