= 1190 Pelagia =

Main-belt asteroid

Discovery
- Discovered by: G. Neujmin
- Discovery site: Simeiz Obs.
- Discovery date: 20 September 1930

Designations
- Named after: Pelageya Shajn (Soviet–Russian astronomer)
- Alternative designations: 1930 SL · 1928 DP; 1938 YA · 1953 VB; 1953 XP · A909 BC
- Minor planet category: main-belt · (inner); Nysa–Polana complex

Orbital characteristics
- Epoch 4 September 2017 (JD 2458000.5)
- Uncertainty parameter 0
- Observation arc: 108.44 yr (39,609 days)
- Aphelion: 2.7530 AU
- Perihelion: 2.1096 AU
- Semi-major axis: 2.4313 AU
- Eccentricity: 0.1323
- Orbital period (sidereal): 3.79 yr (1,385 days)
- Mean anomaly: 284.95°
- Mean motion: 0° 15^{m} 36^{s} / day
- Inclination: 3.1697°
- Longitude of ascending node: 26.477°
- Argument of perihelion: 41.199°

Physical characteristics
- Dimensions: 15.05±3.86 km 17.30±0.27 km 17.39 km (derived); 17.923±0.185 km
- Synodic rotation period: 2.3661±0.0003 h
- Geometric albedo: 0.031±0.042; 0.0486 (derived); 0.054±0.018; 0.067±0.002
- Spectral type: X · C
- Absolute magnitude (H): 12.40 · 12.60 · 12.7 · 12.78±0.23 · 13.13

1190 Pelagia, provisional designation 1930 SL, is a dark asteroid from the inner regions of the asteroid belt, approximately 17 kilometers in diameter. It was discovered on 20 September 1930, by Soviet–Georgian astronomer Grigory Neujmin at the Simeiz Observatory on the Crimean peninsula. The asteroid was named after astronomer Pelageya Shajn.

== Classification and orbit ==
Pelagia is a member of the Nysa–Polana complex, a collection of overlapping asteroid families in the inner main asteroid belt.

It orbits the Sun at a distance of 2.1–2.8 AU once every 3 years and 9 months (1,385 days). Its orbit has an eccentricity of 0.13 and an inclination of 3° with respect to the ecliptic. The asteroid's observation arc begins at Heidelberg Observatory in January 1909, when it was identified as A909 BC, more than 21 years prior to its official discovery observation at Simeiz.

== Physical characteristics ==
The asteroid has been characterized as an X-type asteroid by Pan-STARRS photometric survey.

=== Lightcurve ===
In December 2010, a rotational lightcurve of Pelagia was obtained from photometric observations by Japanese astronomer couple Hiromi and Hiroko Hamanowa. Lightcurve analysis gave a well-defined rotation period of 2.3661 hours with a brightness amplitude of 0.08 magnitude (U=3).

While not being a fast rotator, the body has a notably short period for an asteroid of its size. Based on the lightcurve's low amplitude, it appears to have a rather spheroidal shape.

=== Diameter and albedo ===
According to the surveys carried out by the Japanese Akari satellite and the NEOWISE mission of NASA's Wide-field Infrared Survey Explorer, Pelagia measures between 15.05 and 17.923 kilometers in diameter and its surface has an albedo between 0.031 and 0.067. The Collaborative Asteroid Lightcurve Link derives an albedo of 0.0486 and a diameter of 17.39 kilometers based on an absolute magnitude of 12.7.

== Naming ==
This minor planet was named in honor of Soviet–Russian astronomer Pelageya Shajn (1894–1956). In 1928, she discovered the asteroid 1112 Polonia and became the first female discoverer of minor planets (RI 895). A second asteroid, 1648 Shajna, was also named in her and her husbands memory (Grigory Shajn).
