= Comet Tsuchinshan =

Comet Tsuchinshan may refer to any comets below discovered by the Purple Mountain Observatory:

- 60P/Tsuchinshan 2
- 62P/Tsuchinshan 1
- C/1977 V1 (Tsuchinshan)
- C/2017 E2 (Tsuchinshan)
- C/2021 S4 (Tsuchinshan)
- C/2023 A3 (Tsuchinshan–ATLAS), also known as the Great Comet of 2024
- C/2025 A3 (Tsuchinshan)
- C/2026 C1 (Tsuchinshan)
