= Kwee =

Kwee or KWEE may refer to:

- 4646 Kwee, a main-belt asteroid, named after astronomer Kiem King Kwee (b. 1927)
- 59P/Kearns–Kwee, a periodic comet
- KXZZ (FM), a radio station (100.1 FM) licensed to Dayton, Nevada, United States, which held the call sign KWEE from 2021 to 2024
- KKWA, a radio station (96.3 FM) licensed to West Linn, Oregon, United States, which held the call sign KWEE from 2016 to 2019
- An alternate Romanization of the surname Guo

== People ==
- The Kwee family of Ciledug, a historic family of the 'Cabang Atas' or the Chinese gentry of colonial Indonesia'
- The Kwee family of Pontiac Land Group, a later, contemporary Singaporean business family of Chinese-Indonesian descent
- Kwee Tek Hoay (1886–1951) was a Chinese Indonesian Malay-language writer
- Kwee Wee, ring name of American wrestler Allan Eric Funk (born 1971)
- Derre Kwee (born 1994), a Dutch footballer
- Giam Choo Kwee (born 1942), a Singapore chess International Master
- Lo Kwee-seong (1910–1995), a Hong Kong businessman and philanthropist
- Kwee Phyo (U Phyo Min Thein), a Burmese politician and former political prisoner who is currently serving as Chief Minister of Yangon Region.
