= 61P/Shajn–Schaldach =

Jupiter-family comet

61P/Shajn-Schaldach
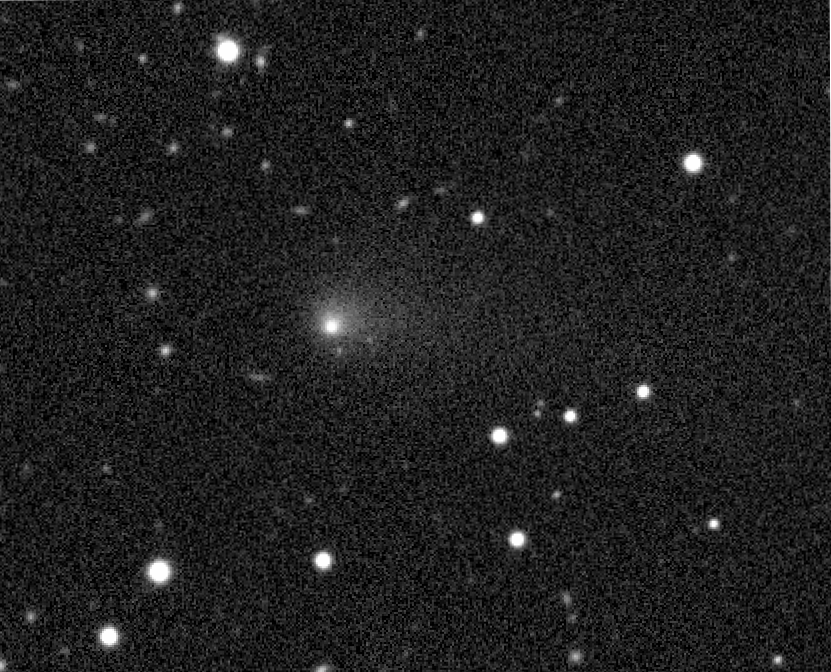
- Comet Shajn–Schaldach photographed from the Zwicky Transient Facility on 19 October 2022.

Discovery
- Discovered by: Pelageja F. Shajn; Robert D. Schaldach
- Discovery site: Simeiz Observatory, USSR; Lowell Observatory, USA
- Discovery date: 18–20 September 1949

Designations
- MPC designation: P/1949 S1, P/1971 S2
- Alternative designations: 1949 VI, 1971 IX, 1979 I; 1986 X, 1993 XVII; 1949e, 1971e, 1978i; 1985i, 1993k

Orbital characteristics
- Epoch: 21 November 2025 (JD 2461000.5)
- Observation arc: 74.39 years (Note: Observation arc from the Minor Planet Center database only covered dates from 26 September 1949 until 9 February 2024 (74.37 years). This figure includes its entire arc up to 18 September 1949.)
- Number of observations: 2,805
- Aphelion: 5.252 AU
- Perihelion: 2.130 AU
- Semi-major axis: 3.691 AU
- Eccentricity: 0.42286
- Orbital period: 7.091 years
- Inclination: 5.996°
- Longitude of ascending node: 162.96°
- Argument of periapsis: 221.72°
- Mean anomaly: 156.34°
- Last perihelion: 23 October 2022
- Next perihelion: 25 November 2029
- T_{Jupiter}: 2.927
- Earth MOID: 1.133 AU
- Jupiter MOID: 0.306 AU

Physical characteristics
- Mean radius: 0.61 ± 0.03 km (0.379 ± 0.019 mi)
- Mean density: 490±60 kg/m^{3}
- Synodic rotation period: 4.9 hours
- Comet total magnitude (M1): 11.9
- Comet nuclear magnitude (M2): 15.4

Comet Shajn–Schaldach, also known as 61P/Shajn–Schaldach, is a Jupiter-family comet with a 7.09-year orbit around the Sun. It is the only comet discovered by Pelageja F. Shajn and Robert D. Schaldach.

== Observational history ==
It was discovered on 18 September 1949 on a photographic plate by Pelageja F. Shajn at the Simeiz Observatory, Crimea, part of the Crimean Astrophysical Observatory. It was also discovered independently two days later by Robert D. Schaldach at the Lowell Observatory in Arizona, US, also on a photographic plate. Shajn then found evidence of the comet on earlier photographs taken on August 28 and September 4.

The first computations of the comet's orbit gave a perihelion date of between December 1949 and October 1950 with a periodicity of 7.76 years. After taking into account perturbations due a close approach to Jupiter the next perihelion was calculated to be on 15 March 1957 but in that year it was never found. It was also not discovered on its next predicted appearance in 1964. The most likely explanation for the two failures was the comet's faintness.

It was, however, re-located on 29 September 1971 by Charles T. Kowal of the Department of Astrophysics, California Institute of Technology, US, using the 122 cm Palomar Schmidt telescope, who estimated its brightness at a faint magnitude of 16. Other astronomers confirmed the sighting.

The comet was successfully observed on its subsequent returns in 1979, 1986, 1993, 2001 and 2008.

== Physical characteristics ==
Based on observations by the Hubble Space Telescope the nucleus of the comet has an effective radius of 0.61 ± 0.03 km (0.379 ± 0.019 mi).

== See also ==
- C/1925 F1 (Shajn–Comas Solá) — a non-periodic comet co-discovered by Pelageya F. Shajn's husband, Grigory Shajn.

== Notes ==
Numbered comets
Previous; 60P/Tsuchinshan	61P/Shajn–Schaldach	Next; 62P/Tsuchinshan
