= Pelageya Shajn =

Russian astronomer

Minor planets discovered: 19
see § List of discovered minor planets

Pelageya Fedorovna Shajn, née Sannikova (Пелагея Фёдоровна Шайн) (22 September 1894 – 27 August 1956), was a Russian astronomer in the Soviet Union, and the first woman credited with the discovery of a minor planet, at the Simeiz Observatory in 1928. Pelageya also discovered numerous variable stars and co-discovered the periodic, Jupiter-family comet 61P/Shajn–Schaldach. She was married to prominent Soviet astronomer Grigory Shajn.

== Biography ==
Pelageya Shajn was born in 1894 to a peasant family in the village Ostanin located in the Solikamsky District of the Perm Governorate. She was the wife of prominent Soviet astronomer Grigory Shajn, who was also her colleague at the Simeiz Observatory. Her maiden name was Sannikova (Санникова). In 1928, she discovered the asteroid 1112 Polonia, the first minor planet to be discovered by a woman.

She died 27 August 1956, shortly after her husband had died on 4 August the same year.

== Awards and honors ==
Main-belt asteroid 1190 Pelagia, discovered in 1930 by Grigory Neujmin who worked at Simeiz, was named in her honor. In addition the asteroid 1648 Shajna was named in her and her husband's memory, while the lunar crater Shayn was exclusively named after her husband.

== Discoveries ==
Her astronomical discoveries are credited under the name P. F. Shajn. As with her husband, her last name, "Shajn", is sometimes given as "Schajn", "Shain" or "Shayn", the latter being the modern English transliteration.

Pelageya Shajn discovered 19 minor planets (see list below) and about 140 variable stars. In 1949, she also co-discovered 61P/Shajn–Schaldach, a periodic comet of the Jupiter family. However, the non-periodic comet C/1925 F1 (Shajn-Comas Solá; also known as Comet 1925 VI or Comet 1925a) was co-discovered by her husband rather than by her.

=== List of discovered minor planets ===
1112 Polonia	15 August 1928	list
1113 Katja	15 August 1928	list
1120 Cannonia	11 September 1928	list
1121 Natascha	11 September 1928	list
1369 Ostanina	27 August 1935	list
1387 Kama	27 August 1935	list
1390 Abastumani	3 October 1935	list
1475 Yalta	21 September 1935	list
1610 Mirnaya	11 September 1928	list
1648 Shajna	5 September 1935	list

1654 Bojeva	8 October 1931	list
1735 ITA	10 September 1948	list
1954 Kukarkin	15 August 1952	list
1987 Kaplan	11 September 1952	list
2108 Otto Schmidt	4 October 1948	list
2445 Blazhko	3 October 1935	list
3080 Moisseiev	3 October 1935	list
3958 Komendantov	10 October 1953	list
5533 Bagrov	21 September 1935	list

== See also ==
- List of minor planet discoverers § P. F. Shajn
