= 58P/Jackson–Neujmin =

Periodic comet

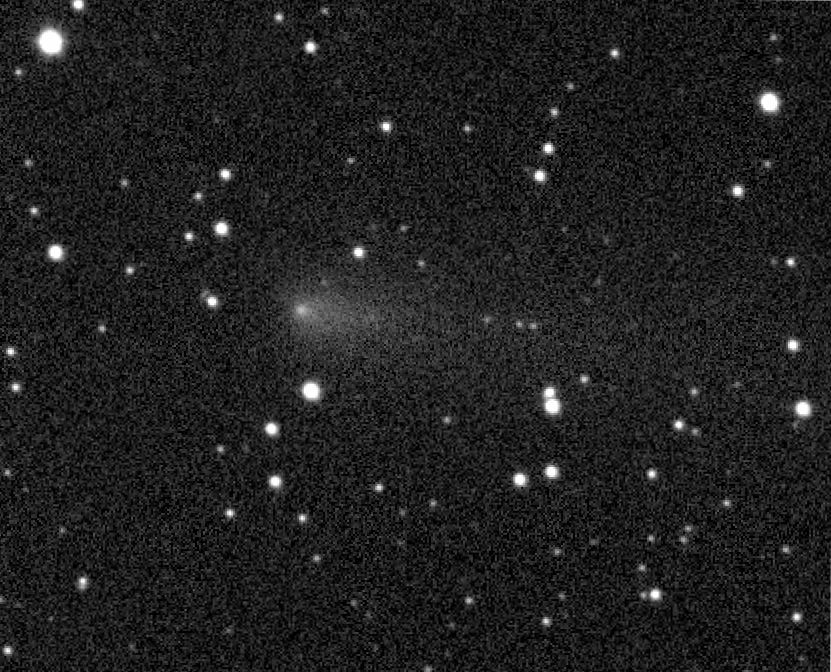
- Comet Jackson–Neujmin photographed from the Zwicky Transient Facility on 2 August 2020

Discovery
- Discovered by: Cyril Jackson; Grigory N. Neujmin
- Discovery site: Union, South Africa; Simeis, Crimea
- Discovery date: 20–21 September 1936

Designations
- MPC designation: P/1936 S1, P/1970 R1
- Alternative designations: 1936 IV, 1970 IX; 1978 XXVI, 1987 VIII

Orbital characteristics
- Epoch: 13 September 2023 (JD 2460200.5)
- Observation arc: 50.16 years
- Number of observations: 508
- Aphelion: 6.798 AU
- Perihelion: 1.379 AU
- Semi-major axis: 4.089 AU
- Eccentricity: 0.66257
- Orbital period: 8.268 years
- Inclination: 13.105°
- Longitude of ascending node: 159.07°
- Argument of periapsis: 200.54°
- Mean anomaly: 143.44°
- Last perihelion: 25 May 2020
- Next perihelion: 4 September 2028
- T_{Jupiter}: 2.567
- Earth MOID: 0.381 AU
- Jupiter MOID: 0.282 AU

Physical characteristics
- Mean radius: 0.6 km (0.37 mi)
- Comet total magnitude (M1): 9.1
- Comet nuclear magnitude (M2): 16.3

58P/Jackson–Neujmin is a periodic comet in the Solar System with a current orbital period of 8.19 years.

== Observational history ==
The comet was discovered on a photographic plate on 20 September 1936 by Cyril Jackson of the Union Observatory, South Africa, who described it as faint and diffuse, with a brightness of magnitude 12. On the following day Grigory N. Neujmin of the Simeis Observatory in Crimea discovered it independently. Fernand Rigaux of the Royal Observatory in Uccle, Belgium then also found it on an earlier photographic plate exposed on 9 September 1936.

The predicted 1945 apparition was not observed due to uncertainty about its position and appearance date and even Elizabeth Roemer was unable to find it in 1953. 1961 was again very difficult but Charles Kowal managed to relocate it in September, 1970. The 1995 appearance was more favourable and brightness reached a magnitude of 10. The comet wasn't observed during its 2004 or 2012 apparitions, and was thought to be potentially lost until it was successfully recovered in April 2020 at magnitude 12 by the Solar Wind Anisotropies (SWAN) camera on the Solar Heliospheric Observer (SOHO) spacecraft. Due to an outburst event the magnitude increased from 12 to 10 in late March 2020.

== See also ==
- List of numbered comets

Numbered comets
Previous; 57P/du Toit–Neujmin–Delporte	58P/Jackson–Neujmin	Next; 59P/Kearns–Kwee
