= 1735 ITA =

Main-belt asteroid

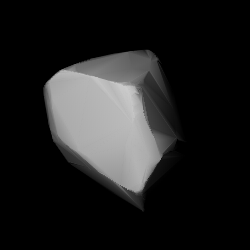
- Shape model of ITA from its lightcurve

Discovery
- Discovered by: P. F. Shajn
- Discovery site: Simeiz Obs.
- Discovery date: 10 September 1948

Designations
- Named after: Institute for Theoretical Astronomy (USSR)
- Alternative designations: 1948 RJ_{1} · 1929 DA; 1931 RF_{1} · 1934 BC; 1935 GC · 1937 TN; 1948 TB_{1} · 1948 TK; 1951 DL · 1951 EY; 1952 HN_{2} · 1952 JB; A907 GC
- Minor planet category: main-belt · (outer)

Orbital characteristics
- Epoch 4 September 2017 (JD 2458000.5)
- Uncertainty parameter 0
- Observation arc: 109.99 yr (40,173 days)
- Aphelion: 3.5471 AU
- Perihelion: 2.7277 AU
- Semi-major axis: 3.1374 AU
- Eccentricity: 0.1306
- Orbital period (sidereal): 5.56 yr (2,030 days)
- Mean anomaly: 198.34°
- Mean motion: 0° 10^{m} 38.64^{s} / day
- Inclination: 15.608°
- Longitude of ascending node: 9.3378°
- Argument of perihelion: 276.02°

Physical characteristics
- Dimensions: 61.87±0.65 km 61.93 km (derived); 62.34±2.4 km 66.09±1.13 km
- Synodic rotation period: 12.599±0.003 h 12.6±0.1 h 12.6103±0.0005 h
- Geometric albedo: 0.0461 (derived); 0.051±0.011; 0.070±0.003; 0.0790±0.007
- Spectral type: C
- Absolute magnitude (H): 9.4 · 9.90 · 10.0 · 10.37±0.78

1735 ITA (prov. designation: 1948 RJ_{1}) is a carbonaceous asteroid from the outer region of the asteroid belt, approximately 62 kilometers in diameter. It was discovered on 10 September 1948, by Soviet–Russian astronomer Pelageya Shajn at the Simeiz Observatory located on the Crimean peninsula. It was named for the Institute for Theoretical Astronomy (ITA) in what is now Saint Petersburg, Russia.

== Classification and orbit ==
ITA orbits the Sun in the outer main-belt at a distance of 2.7–3.5 AU once every 5 years and 7 months (2,030 days). Its orbit has an eccentricity of 0.13 and an inclination of 16° with respect to the ecliptic.

It was first identified as A907 GC at Heidelberg Observatory in 1907, extending the body's observation arc by 41 years prior to its official discovery observation.

== Physical characteristics ==
ITA has been characterized as a carbonaceous C-type asteroid.

=== Lightcurves ===
In November 2004, a rotational lightcurve was obtained by French amateur astronomer René Roy, gave a rotation period of 12.599 hours with a brightness variation of 0.27 magnitude (U=3-). In March 2007, astronomers Laurent Brunetto and Jean-Gabriel Bosch derived a concurring period of 12.6 hours with and amplitude of 0.40 magnitude (U=2-) A 2016-published light-curve from the Lowell Photometric Database gave a period of 12.6103 hours (U=n.a.).

=== Diameter and albedo ===
According to the surveys carried out by the Infrared Astronomical Satellite IRAS, the Japanese Akari satellite, and NASA's Wide-field Infrared Survey Explorer with its subsequent NEOWISE mission, ITA measures between 61.87 and 66.09 kilometers in diameter, and its surface has an albedo between 0.051 and 0.079. The Collaborative Asteroid Lightcurve Link derives an albedo of 0.0461 and a diameter of 61.93 kilometers with an absolute magnitude of 10.0.

Between 2009 and 2023, 1735 ITA has been observed to occult four stars.

== Naming ==
This minor planet was named in 1979, on the occasion of the 60th anniversary of the founding of the USSR Academy of Sciences' Institute for Theoretical Astronomy (ITA), in what was then Leningrad. The official naming citation was published by the Minor Planet Center on 1 June 1980 (M.P.C. 5357).
