= 1113 Katja =

Background asteroid

Discovery
- Discovered by: P. Shajn
- Discovery site: Simeiz Obs.
- Discovery date: 15 August 1928

Designations
- Named after: Ekaterina Iosko (assistant at Simeiz Observatory)
- Alternative designations: 1928 QC · A909 DH
- Minor planet category: main-belt · (outer) background

Orbital characteristics
- Epoch 4 September 2017 (JD 2458000.5)
- Uncertainty parameter 0
- Observation arc: 108.74 yr (39,719 days)
- Aphelion: 3.5537 AU
- Perihelion: 2.6687 AU
- Semi-major axis: 3.1112 AU
- Eccentricity: 0.1422
- Orbital period (sidereal): 5.49 yr (2,004 days)
- Mean anomaly: 341.95°
- Mean motion: 0° 10^{m} 46.56^{s} / day
- Inclination: 13.280°
- Longitude of ascending node: 324.54°
- Argument of perihelion: 119.15°

Physical characteristics
- Dimensions: 38.20±0.58 km 38.50±2.0 km 38.65 km (derived); 44.792±0.626 km 51.949±1.531 km
- Synodic rotation period: 18±1 h 18.42±0.02 h 18.465±0.010 h 18.47±0.05 h
- Geometric albedo: 0.1144±0.0266; 0.168±0.026; 0.195±0.018; 0.2071±0.023; 0.211±0.008; 0.2253 (derived)
- Spectral type: C (assumed)
- Absolute magnitude (H): 9.30 · 9.40 · 9.49±0.20

1113 Katja (provisional designation 1928 QC) is a background asteroid from the outer regions of the asteroid belt, approximately 39 kilometers in diameter. It was discovered by Pelageya Shajn at the Simeiz Observatory in 1928, and named after Ekaterina Iosko, a staff member at the discovering observatory.

== Discovery ==
Katja was discovered on 15 August 1928, by Soviet astronomer Pelageya Shajn at the Simeiz Observatory on the Crimean peninsula. Nine nights later, it was independently discovered by Max Wolf at the German Heidelberg Observatory on 24 August 1928. The Minor Planet Center only recognizes the first discoverer. The asteroid was first observed as A909 DH at Heidelberg in February 1909.

== Orbit and classification ==
Katja is a non-family asteroid of the main belt's background population. It orbits the Sun in the outer asteroid belt at a distance of 2.7–3.6 AU once every 5 years and 6 months (2,004 days; semi-major axis of 3.11 AU). Its orbit has an eccentricity of 0.14 and an inclination of 13° with respect to the ecliptic. The body's observation arc begins at Heidelberg, 10 days after its official discovery observation at Simeiz.

== Physical characteristics ==
Although Katja is an assumed, carbonaceous C-type asteroid, it is rather of stony composition due to its high albedo.

=== Rotation period ===
Between 2002 and 2011, several rotational lightcurves of Katja were obtained from photometric observations by French amateur astronomers Maurice Audejean, René Roy and Laurent Brunetto (U=2/2/2-). Best rated lightcurve, however, was obtained at the Sunflower (739), Blackberry (929) and Universidad de Monterrey (720) observatories in January 2002. Lightcurve analysis gave a well-defined synodic rotation period of 18.465 hours with a brightness amplitude of 0.17 magnitude (U=3).

=== Diameter and albedo ===
According to the surveys carried out by the Infrared Astronomical Satellite IRAS, the Japanese Akari satellite and the NEOWISE mission of NASA's Wide-field Infrared Survey Explorer, Katja measures between 38.20 and 51.949 kilometers in diameter and its surface has an albedo between 0.1144 and 0.211.

The Collaborative Asteroid Lightcurve Link derives an albedo of 0.2253 and a diameter of 38.65 kilometers based on an absolute magnitude of 9.3.

== Naming ==
This minor planet was named for Ekaterina ("Katja") Iosko, a laboratory assistant and orbit calculator at the discovering Simeiz Observatory (AN 238, 149). She was the daughter of Iosif Gavrilovich Iosko, who also worked as a mechanician at the observatory.
