= 1648 Shajna =

Stony asteroid from the inner regions of the asteroid belt

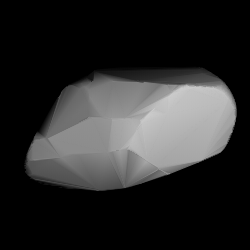
- Shape model of Shajna from its lightcurve

Discovery
- Discovered by: P. Shajn
- Discovery site: Simeiz Obs.
- Discovery date: 5 September 1935

Designations
- Named after: Couple of astronomers (Pelageya and Grigory)
- Alternative designations: 1935 RF · 1934 CK_{1} 1938 MC · 1941 FD; 1948 LC · 1951 EX_{2} 1952 SX · 1952 UW; 1955 QT · 1955 RP; A921 GB · A924 EQ
- Minor planet category: main-belt · (inner)

Orbital characteristics
- Epoch 4 September 2017 (JD 2458000.5)
- Uncertainty parameter 0
- Observation arc: 95.99 yr (35,061 days)
- Aphelion: 2.6971 AU
- Perihelion: 1.7737 AU
- Semi-major axis: 2.2354 AU
- Eccentricity: 0.2065
- Orbital period (sidereal): 3.34 yr (1,221 days)
- Mean anomaly: 250.93°
- Mean motion: 0° 17^{m} 41.64^{s} / day
- Inclination: 4.5723°
- Longitude of ascending node: 130.42°
- Argument of perihelion: 134.71°

Physical characteristics
- Dimensions: 8.26±1.47 km 8.30±0.30 km 9.23 km (calculated); 9.450±0.141 km
- Synodic rotation period: 6.41368±0.00001 h 6.41369±0.00005 h 6.4140±0.0002 h 6.4140±0.0164 h (R); 6.4248±0.0164 h (S)
- Geometric albedo: 0.191±0.016; 0.20 (assumed); 0.247±0.049; 0.35±0.13
- Spectral type: Tholen = S · S B–V = 0.792; U–B = 0.497
- Absolute magnitude (H): 11.838±0.003 (R) · 12.21 · 12.54

1648 Shajna, provisional designation 1935 RF, is a stony asteroid from the inner regions of the asteroid belt, approximately 9 kilometers in diameter. It was discovered on 5 September 1935, by Russian astronomer Pelageya Shajn at Simeiz Observatory on the Crimean peninsula. Two weeks later, it was independently discovered by Cyril Jackson at Johannesburg Observatory, South Africa. It was later named after the discoverer and her husband, Russian astronomers Grigory Shajn.

== Orbit and classification ==
Shajna orbits the Sun in the inner main-belt at a distance of 1.8–2.7 AU once every 3 years and 4 months (1,221 days). Its well-determined orbit has an eccentricity of 0.21 and an inclination of 5° with respect to the ecliptic. In 1921, Shajna was first identified as 1921 GB at Heidelberg Observatory. Its first used observation was taken at Uccle in 1934, when it was identified as 1934 CK_{1}, extending the body's observation arc by one year prior to its official discovery observation.

== Rotation period ==
In July 2005, a rotational lightcurve of was obtained by French amateur astronomer Laurent Bernasconi. It gave a well-defined rotation period of 6.4140 hours with a brightness variation of 0.65 magnitude (U=3). Two modeled lightcurves from various surveys including the Lowell photometric database gave similar periods of 6.41368 and 6.41369 hours (U=n.a.). Photometric observations at the Palomar Transient Factory in September 2012, gave nearly identical periods of 6.4140 and 6.4248 hours in the R- and S-band, respectively (U=2/2).

== Diameter and albedo ==
According to the surveys carried out by NASA's Wide-field Infrared Survey Explorer with its subsequent NEOWISE mission, Shajna measures between 8.26 and 9.45 kilometers in diameter, and its surface has an albedo between 0.191 and 0.35. The Collaborative Asteroid Lightcurve Link assumes a standard albedo for stony asteroids of 0.20 and calculates a diameter of 9.23 kilometers with an absolute magnitude of 12.54.

== Naming ==
This minor planet was named in honor of the late couple of Russian astronomers Grigory Shajn (1892–1956) and the discoverer herself, Pelageya Shajn (1894–1956), first woman ever to discover a minor planet. The asteroid 1190 Pelagia is also named after her, while her husband is honored by the lunar crater Shayn. The official naming citation was published by the Minor Planet Center on 20 February 1962 (M.P.C. 2117).
