= 1369 Ostanina =

Dark and elongated asteroid of the Meliboea family

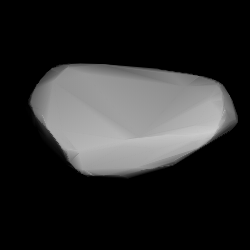
- Shape model of Ostanina from its lightcurve

Discovery
- Discovered by: P. Shajn
- Discovery site: Simeiz Obs.
- Discovery date: 27 August 1935

Designations
- Named after: Ostanin (Discoverer's birthplace)
- Alternative designations: 1935 QB · 1928 FE
- Minor planet category: main-belt · (outer); Meliboea

Orbital characteristics
- Epoch 27 April 2019 (JD 2458600.5)
- Uncertainty parameter 0
- Observation arc: 90.58 yr (33,086 d)
- Aphelion: 3.7770 AU
- Perihelion: 2.4627 AU
- Semi-major axis: 3.1198 AU
- Eccentricity: 0.2106
- Orbital period (sidereal): 5.51 yr (2,013 d)
- Mean anomaly: 110.16°
- Mean motion: 0° 10^{m} 44.04^{s} / day
- Inclination: 14.365°
- Longitude of ascending node: 180.46°
- Argument of perihelion: 127.84°

Physical characteristics
- Mean diameter: 40.59±0.62 km 41.24±4.1 km 42.401±0.162 km 43.561±0.266 km
- Synodic rotation period: 8.4001±0.0002 h
- Geometric albedo: 0.0490; 0.052; 0.0545; 0.061
- Spectral type: Caa/Ch (S3OS2); C (SDSS-MOC)
- Absolute magnitude (H): 10.7

1369 Ostanina (prov. designation: 1935 QB) is a dark and elongated asteroid of the Meliboea family, located in the outer region of the asteroid belt. It was discovered on 27 August 1935, by Soviet astronomer Pelageya Shajn at the Simeiz Observatory on the Crimean peninsula. The hydrated carbonaceous C-type asteroid has a rotation period of 8.4 hours and measures approximately 42 kilometers (26 miles) in diameter. It was named for the Russian village of Ostanin, birthplace of the discoverer.

== Orbit and classification ==
Ostanina orbits the Sun in the outer main-belt at a distance of 2.5–3.8 AU once every 5 years and 6 months (2,013 days; semi-major axis of 3.12 AU). Its orbit has an eccentricity of 0.21 and an inclination of 14° with respect to the ecliptic.

Based on the hierarchical clustering method (HCM) using the asteroid's proper orbital elements, Ostanina is a member of the Meliboea family (604), a smaller asteroid family of a few hundred carbonaceous outer-belt asteroids. The family was named after its lowest-numbered member, 137 Meliboea. In an alternative HCM-analysis, however, Ostanina is an asteroid of the main belt's background population. The body's observation arc begins with its first observation as 1928 FE at the Heidelberg Observatory in March 1928, more than 7 years prior to its official discovery observation at Simeiz–Crimea.

== Naming ==
This minor planet was named after the small village of Ostanin, the birthplace of the discoverer, Pelageya Shajn. The village is located in Perm Krai, now part of the Russian Volga district. The official naming citation was published by the Minor Planet Center in November 1952 (M.P.C. 838; LDS).

== Physical characteristics ==
In both the Tholen- and SMASS-like taxonomy of the Small Solar System Objects Spectroscopic Survey (S3OS2), Ostanina is a hydrated C-type asteroid (Caa and Ch), while in the SDSS-based taxonomy, the asteroid is a common C-type.

=== Rotation period ===
In June 2011, a rotational lightcurve of Ostanina was obtained from photometric observations by French and Swiss astronomers Pierre Antonini, François Colas, Valery Lainey, Laurène Beauvalet and Raoul Behrend. Lightcurve analysis gave a rotation period of 8.4001±0.0002 hours with a very high brightness variation of 1.11 magnitude (U=3). A high brightness amplitude is indicative of a non-spheroidal, elongated shape. Other well defined rotation periods of 8.399 and 8.397 hours were obtained by Robert Stephens at the Center for Solar System Studies (U81) in California in 2017, and by V. G. Shevchenko at the Kharkov Observatory (101) in 1996, respectively (U=3/3). (Note: Lightcurve plot of (1369) Ostanina by Robert Stephens at the Center for Solar System Studies (U81) Quality code is 3. Summary figures at the LCDB and CS3.) (Note: Shevchenko (1996) web: rotation period 8.397 hours with a brightness amplitude of 0.82 mag. Quality code is 3. Summary figures at the LCDB.)

Additional period determinations: 6+ hours by Jean-Gabriel Bosch at the Collonges Observatory (178) (U=2), 6.145 hours at the Catania and Pino Torinese observatories in 2000 (U=1), 8.3945 hours by René Roy in 2016 (U=3-), 8.397 hours by V. G. Chiorny in 2003 and 2007 (U=n.a./2+), (Note: Chiorny (2003) web: rotation period 8.397 hours with a brightness amplitude of 0.84 mag. Summary figures at the LCDB.) and 8.4 hours by Roberto Crippa and Federico Manzini at the Sozzago Astronomical Station (A12) in 2010 (U=2+).

=== Diameter and albedo ===
According to the surveys carried out by the Infrared Astronomical Satellite IRAS, the Japanese Akari satellite and the NEOWISE mission of NASA's Wide-field Infrared Survey Explorer, Ostanina measures between 40.6 and 43.6 kilometers in diameter and its surface has an albedo between 0.049 and 0.061. The Collaborative Asteroid Lightcurve Link adopts the results obtained by IRAS, that is, an albedo of 0.0545 and diameter of 41.24 kilometers using an absolute magnitude of 10.7.
