= 1121 Natascha =

Main-belt asteroid

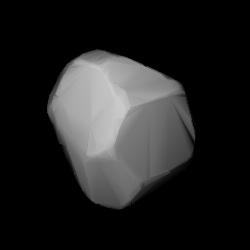
- Shape model of Natascha from its lightcurve

Discovery
- Discovered by: P. Shajn
- Discovery site: Simeiz Obs.
- Discovery date: 11 September 1928

Designations
- Named after: Natasha Tichomirova (daughter of G. Neujmin)
- Alternative designations: 1928 RZ · A918 EK
- Minor planet category: main-belt · (inner) background · Astraea

Orbital characteristics
- Epoch 4 September 2017 (JD 2458000.5)
- Uncertainty parameter 0
- Observation arc: 87.68 yr (32,024 days)
- Aphelion: 2.9500 AU
- Perihelion: 2.1428 AU
- Semi-major axis: 2.5464 AU
- Eccentricity: 0.1585
- Orbital period (sidereal): 4.06 yr (1,484 days)
- Mean anomaly: 285.31°
- Mean motion: 0° 14^{m} 33.36^{s} / day
- Inclination: 6.1646°
- Longitude of ascending node: 357.91°
- Argument of perihelion: 50.379°

Physical characteristics
- Mean diameter: 12.859±0.443 km 14.52±0.54 km 14.89 km (calculated)
- Synodic rotation period: 13.197±0.003 h
- Pole ecliptic latitude: (16.0°, 59.0°) (λ_{1}/β_{1}); (209.0°, 50.0°) (λ_{2}/β_{2})
- Geometric albedo: 0.160±0.013; 0.20 (assumed); 0.294±0.023
- Spectral type: S (assumed)
- Absolute magnitude (H): 11.40 · 11.5 · 11.80

1121 Natascha (prov. designation: 1928 RZ) is a background asteroid from the central regions of the asteroid belt. It was discovered on 11 September 1928, by Soviet astronomer Pelageya Shajn at the Simeiz Observatory on the Crimean peninsula. The presumed S-type asteroid has rotation period of 13.2 hours and measures approximately 14 kilometers (8.7 miles) in diameter. It was named for Natasha Tichomirova, daughter of astronomer Grigory Neujmin.

== Orbit and classification ==
Natascha is a non-family asteroid from the main belt's background population. Conversely, the asteroid is also considered a core member of the disputed Astraea family. It orbits the Sun in the central main-belt at a distance of 2.1–3.0 AU once every 4 years and 1 month (1,484 days; semi-major axis of 2.55 AU). Its orbit has an eccentricity of 0.16 and an inclination of 6° with respect to the ecliptic. The asteroid was first observed as A918 EK at Simeiz Observatory in March 1918. The body's observation arc begins at Heidelberg Observatory in February 1930, or 17 months after its official discovery observation at Simeiz.

== Naming ==
This minor planet was named as a birthday present for Soviet hydrogeologist Natasha (Natalia) Tichomirova, daughter of Grigory Neujmin, who was an astronomer at the discovering Simeiz Observatory and prolific discoverer of minor planets himself (AN 240;409). The author of the Dictionary of Minor Planet Names, Lutz Schmadel, learned about the naming circumstances from Crimean astronomers N. Solovaya, Nataliya Sergeevna Samoilova-Yakhontova and Nikolai Chernykh (also see 1653 Yakhontovia and 2325 Chernykh).

== Physical characteristics ==
Natascha is an assumed, stony S-type asteroid.

=== Rotation period and poles ===
In May 2012, a rotational lightcurve of Natascha was obtained from photometric observations by astronomers at the Oakley Southern Sky Observatory in Australia. Lightcurve analysis gave a well-defined rotation period of 13.197 hours with a brightness variation of 0.51 magnitude (U=3). A high brightness amplitude typically indicates a non-spherical shape.

In 2016, a modeled lightcurve was published using photometric data from the Lowell Photometric Database. Lightcurve inversion gave a concurring period of 13.19717±0.00001 hours, as well as two spin axes of (16.0°, 59.0°) and (209.0°, 50.0°) in ecliptic coordinates (λ, β).

=== Diameter and albedo ===
According to the surveys carried out by the Japanese Akari satellite and the NEOWISE mission of NASA's Wide-field Infrared Survey Explorer, Natascha measures between 12.859 and 14.52 kilometers in diameter and its surface has an albedo between 0.160 and 0.294.

The Collaborative Asteroid Lightcurve Link assumes a standard albedo for stony asteroids of 0.20 and calculates a diameter of 14.89 kilometers based on an absolute magnitude of 11.5.
