= C/1925 V1 (Wilk–Peltier) =

Parabolic comet

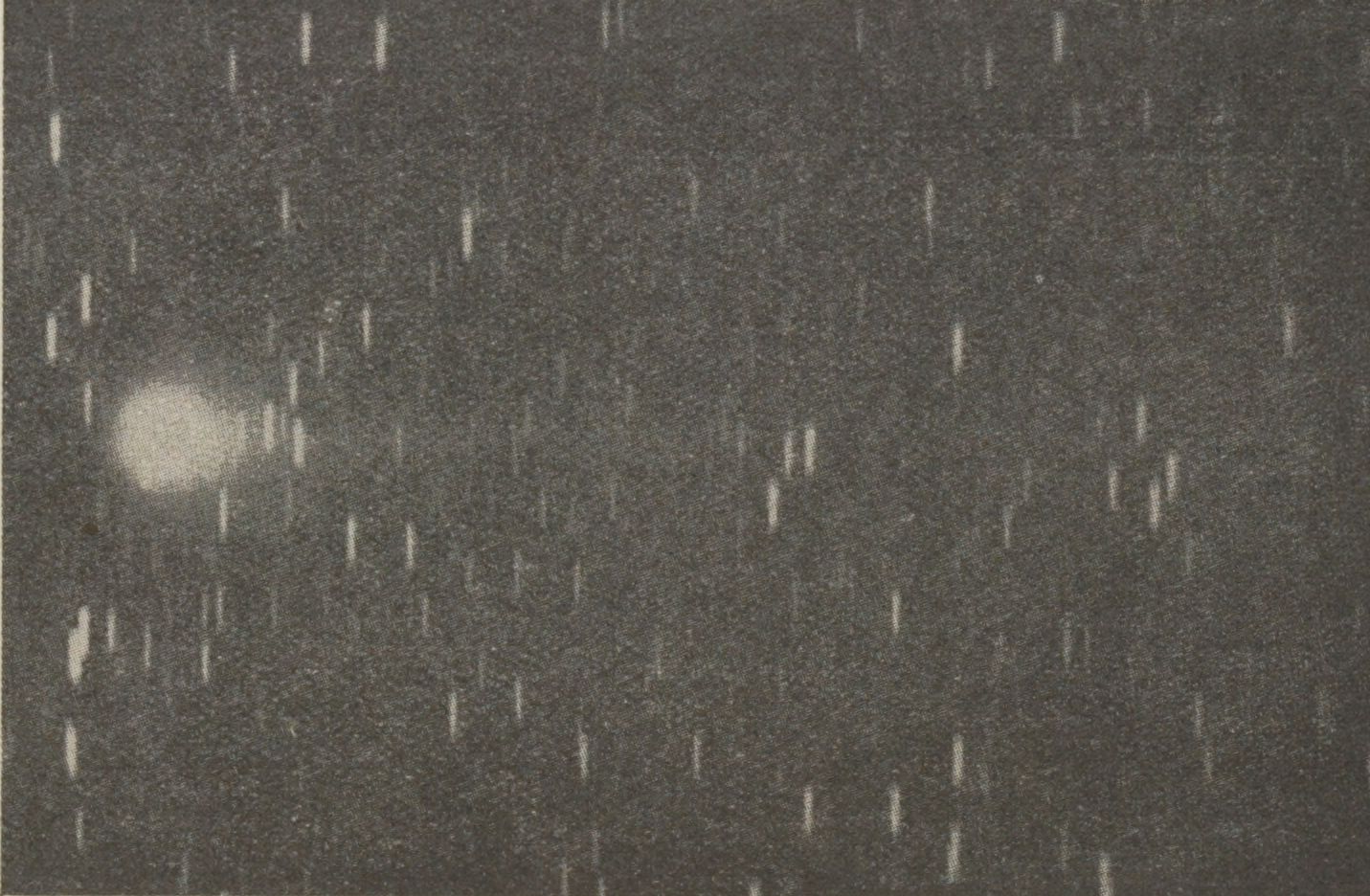
- Comet Wilk–Peltier photographed by George van Biesbroeck from the Yerkes Observatory on 10 December 1925

Discovery
- Discovered by: Antoni Wilk; Leslie C. Peltier
- Discovery site: Kraków, Poland; Delphos, Ohio
- Discovery date: 13–19 November 1925

Designations
- Alternative designations: 1925 XI, 1925k

Orbital characteristics
- Epoch: 7 December 1925 (JD 2424491.7674)
- Observation arc: 40 days
- Number of observations: 164
- Perihelion: 0.764 AU
- Eccentricity: 1.00051
- Inclination: 144.598°
- Longitude of ascending node: 141.782°
- Argument of periapsis: 126.130°
- Last perihelion: 7 December 1925

Physical characteristics
- Mean radius: 0.449 km (0.279 mi) (Note: Calculated mean radius using the formula: $\log_{10}\,(\,R\,)\ =\;0.9 +\;0.13 (\,H\,)$ Where $\,H\,$ is the comet's absolute total magnitude (M1))
- Comet total magnitude (M1): 9.6
- Apparent magnitude: 7.0 (1925 apparition)

Comet Wilk–Peltier, formal designation C/1925 V1, is a faint non-periodic comet that was observed through telescopes in late 1925. It was the first comet discovered by American astronomer, Leslie C. Peltier, of which he co-discovered with Polish astronomer, Antoni Wilk.

== Observational history ==
=== Discovery ===
Leslie C. Peltier spotted the comet on the evening of 13 November 1925. He estimated the comet as an 8th or 9th-magnitude object, which at the time was located within the constellation Boötes. (Note: Reported initial position upon discovery was: α = 15^{h} 25^{m} , δ = 44°) He informed the Harvard College Observatory and the Yerkes Observatory of his discovery to conduct a photographic search on 16–17 November, but failed to see the comet. It was not until Antoni Wilk independently found the same object from Poland on 19 November 1925. (Note: Antoni Wilk located the comet on the following coordinates: α = 17^{h} 18.5^{m} , δ = 33° 04′)

Although initially uncertain whether or not Peltier and Wilk discovered the same object, Leon Campbell reexamined the photographic plates obtained by the Harvard Observatory and found a faint trail of the comet on the edges of both plates taken on the 16th and 17th, thus confirming their discovery. At the time, some publications refer to the comet as "Peltier–Wilk" since Peltier was the first to discover the comet. It was officially renamed to "Wilk–Peltier" as Wilk's announcement allowed follow-up observations to be conducted by other observatories around the globe.

=== Follow-up observations ===
George van Biesbroeck made the last known observations of the comet on 31 December 1925, where he noted it is now a diffuse object that is very low on the horizon as he obtained 3-minute exposures from a 61 cm (24 in) refractor. (Note: The comet was last seen in the constellation Capricornus. The following coordinates were: α = 20^{h} 16.2^{m} , δ = –17° 21′)

== Orbit ==
On 17 November 1925, Wilk–Peltier made its closest approach to Earth at a distance of 0.5743 AU (85.91 million km). Its first orbital calculations were calculated by C. W. Ebell in 1926, which were later refined by van Biesbroeck, Richard A. Rossiter, Louis J. Berman, and others. Their work reveals the comet had a parabolic trajectory with a perihelion date on 6 December 1925. Later in 1929, Felicjan Kępiński revised this to a weakly hyperbolic trajectory and a perihelion date on December 7th, however he did not apply any planetary perturbations into account.

== See also ==
- C/1925 F1 (Shajn–Comas Solá)
- C/1925 G1 (Orkisz)
