= 1057 Wanda =

Carbonaceous background asteroid

Discovery
- Discovered by: G. Shajn
- Discovery site: Simeiz Obs.
- Discovery date: 16 August 1925

Designations
- Named after: Wanda Wasilewska (Polish–Soviet writer)
- Alternative designations: 1925 QB · 1937 AF; 1950 QY · 1965 WG
- Minor planet category: main-belt · (outer) background

Orbital characteristics
- Epoch 4 September 2017 (JD 2458000.5)
- Uncertainty parameter 0
- Observation arc: 91.88 yr (33,558 days)
- Aphelion: 3.6116 AU
- Perihelion: 2.1853 AU
- Semi-major axis: 2.8984 AU
- Eccentricity: 0.2460
- Orbital period (sidereal): 4.93 yr (1,802 days)
- Mean anomaly: 224.08°
- Mean motion: 0° 11^{m} 58.92^{s} / day
- Inclination: 3.5319°
- Longitude of ascending node: 257.95°
- Argument of perihelion: 114.20°

Physical characteristics
- Dimensions: 40.41 km (derived); 40.47±2.1 km 42.72±15.73 km 42.809±0.834 km 44.39±0.88 km 44.657±0.510 km 48.85±6.58 km
- Synodic rotation period: 24 h 28.49±0.03 h 28.8 h
- Geometric albedo: 0.0279±0.0035; 0.03±0.01; 0.03±0.02; 0.037±0.007; 0.038±0.002; 0.0415 (derived); 0.0446±0.005
- Spectral type: C
- Absolute magnitude (H): 10.96 · 11.01 · 11.04 · 11.04±0.21

1057 Wanda, provisional designation 1925 QB, is a carbonaceous background asteroid from the outer region of the asteroid belt, approximately 43 kilometers in diameter. It was discovered by Grigory Shajn at the Simeiz Observatory in 1925, and later named after Polish–Soviet writer Wanda Wasilewska. The asteroid has a rotation period of 28.8 hours.

== Discovery ==
Wanda was discovered on its first recorded observation on 16 August 1925, by Soviet astronomer Grigory Shajn at the Simeiz Observatory on the Crimean peninsula. Three nights later, it was independently discovered by German astronomer Karl Reinmuth at Heidelberg Observatory on 19 August 1925. The Minor Planet Center only recognizes the first discoverer.

== Orbit and classification ==
Wanda is a non-family asteroid from the main belt's background population. It orbits the Sun in the outer asteroid belt at a distance of 2.2–3.6 AU once every 4 years and 11 months (1,802 days; semi-major axis of 2.90 AU). Its orbit has an eccentricity of 0.25 and an inclination of 4° with respect to the ecliptic. The body's observation arc begins at Heidelberg Observatory, just three nights after its official discovery at Simeiz.

== Physical characteristics ==
Wanda has been characterized as a carbonaceous C-type asteroid by Pan-STARRS' photometric survey.

=== Rotation period ===
Three rotational lightcurves of Wanda have been obtained from photometric observations by astronomers Eric Barbotin (2004), Donald Pray (2004), Richard Binzel (1984), respectively (U=1/2/2). The consolidated lightcurve analysis gave a longer-than average rotation period of 28.8 hours with a brightness amplitude between 0.14 and 0.41 magnitude (U=2).

=== Diameter and albedo ===
According to the surveys carried out by the Infrared Astronomical Satellite IRAS, the Japanese Akari satellite and the NEOWISE mission of NASA's Wide-field Infrared Survey Explorer, Wanda measures between 40.47 and 48.85 kilometers in diameter and its surface has a low albedo between 0.0279 and 0.0446.

The Collaborative Asteroid Lightcurve Link derives an albedo of 0.0415 and a diameter of 40.41 kilometers based on an absolute magnitude of 11.04.

== Naming ==
This minor planet was named after Polish–Soviet novelist Wanda Wasilewska (1905–1964), also known by her Russian name Vanda Lvovna Vasilevskaya. Another interpretation of the asteroid's name is derived from mythology and ancient Polish annals, and refers to the legendary daughter of Krak, Wanda, who founded the city of Kraków (AN 229, 279).
