= C/1925 G1 (Orkisz) =

Parabolic comet

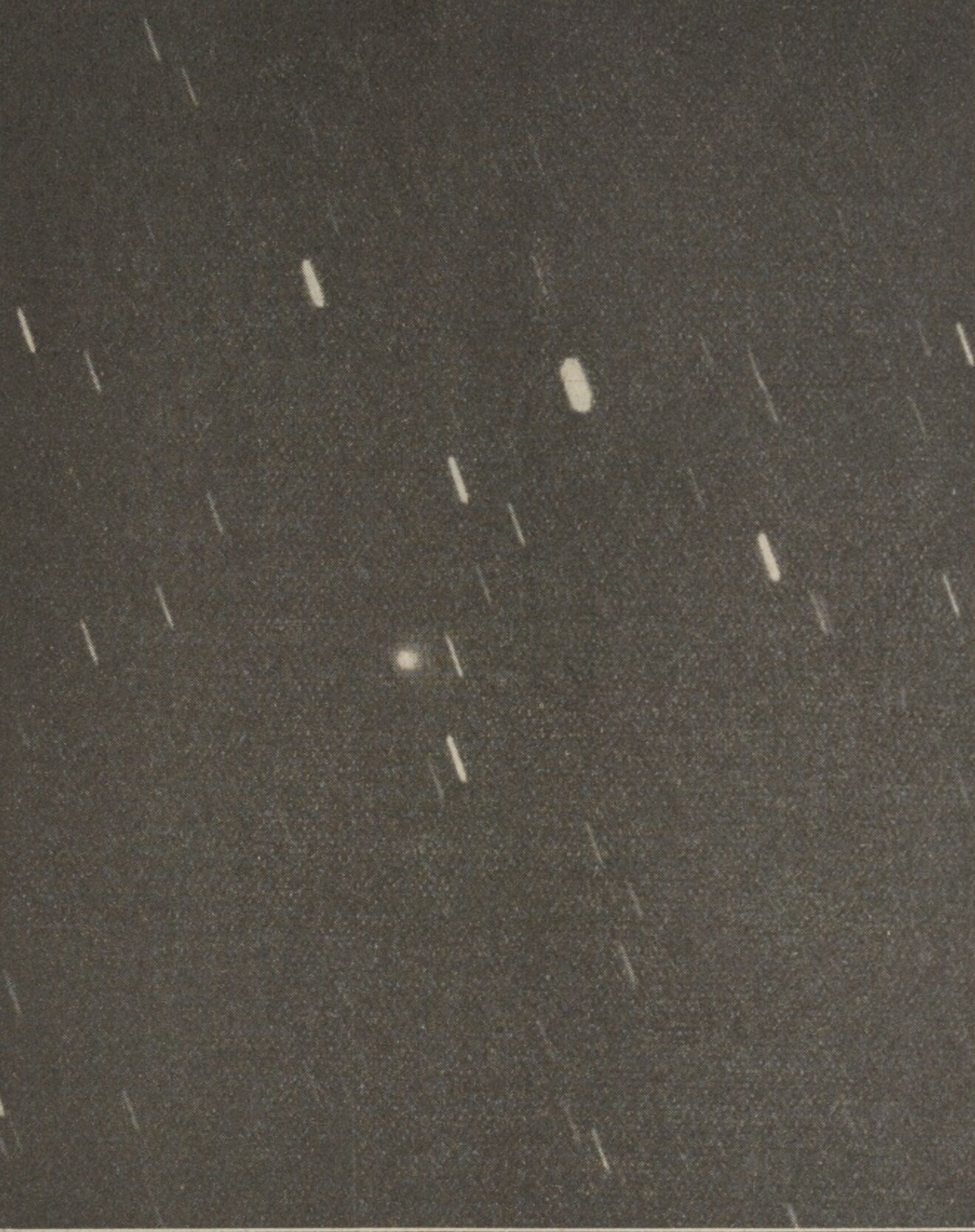
- Comet Orkisz photographed by Ferdinand Quénisset on 13 May 1925.

Discovery
- Discovered by: Lucien Orkisz
- Discovery site: Kraków, Poland
- Discovery date: 3 April 1925

Designations
- Alternative designations: 1925 I, 1925c

Orbital characteristics
- Epoch: 31 March 1925 (JD 2424240.5)
- Observation arc: 391 days (1.07 years)
- Number of observations: 201
- Perihelion: 1.109 AU
- Eccentricity: 1.000605
- Inclination: 100.02°
- Longitude of ascending node: 319.11°
- Argument of periapsis: 36.181°
- Last perihelion: 1 April 1925

Physical characteristics
- Mean radius: 1.531 km (0.951 mi) (Note: Calculated mean radius using the formula: $\log_{10}\,(\,R\,)\ =\;0.9 +\;0.13 (\,H\,)$ Where $\,H\,$ is the comet's absolute total magnitude (M1))
- Comet total magnitude (M1): 5.4
- Comet nuclear magnitude (M2): 10.0
- Apparent magnitude: 6.7 (1925 apparition)

Comet Orkisz, formally designated as C/1925 G1, is a non-periodic comet that was observed between April 1925 and May 1926. It is the only comet discovered by Polish astronomer, Lucien Orkisz, and the very first comet ever discovered from Poland.

== See also ==
- C/1925 F1 (Shajn–Comas Solá)
- C/1925 V1 (Wilk–Peltier)
