= 63P/Wild =

Jupiter-family comet

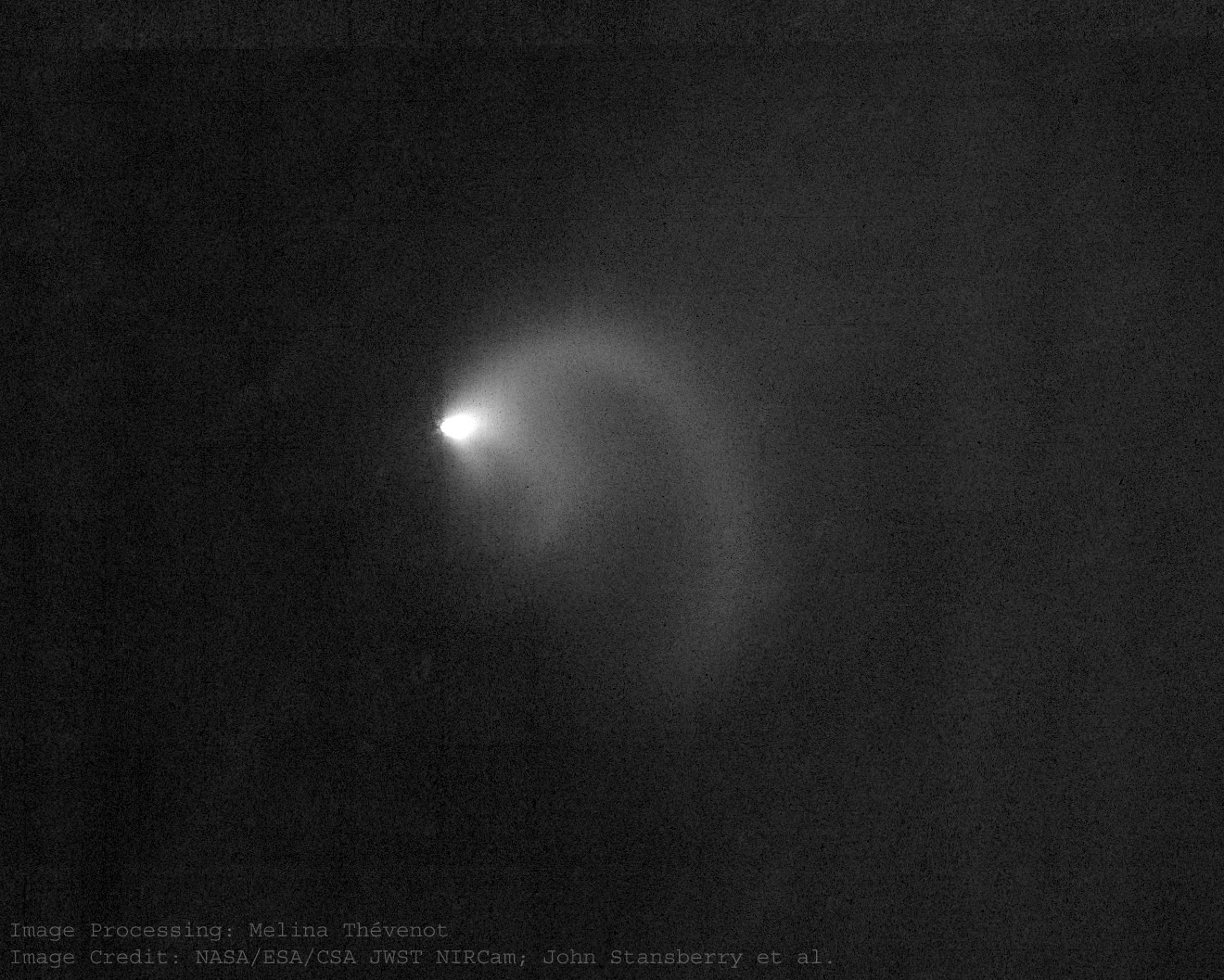
- 63P/Wild with JWST NIRCam at 4.3 μm, observed on 7 March 2026

Discovery
- Discovered by: Paul Wild
- Discovery site: Zimmerwald Observatory, Switzerland
- Discovery date: 26 March 1960

Designations
- MPC designation: P/1960 G1, P/1973 A2
- Alternative designations: Wild 1; 1960 I, 1973 VIII; 1960b, 1973c

Orbital characteristics
- Epoch: 21 November 2025 (JD 2461000.5)
- Observation arc: 66.23 years (Note: Observation arc from the Minor Planet Center database only covered dates from 16 April 1960 until 19 June 2026 (66.18 years). This figure includes its entire arc up to 26 March 1960.)
- Number of observations: 2,828
- Aphelion: 9.34 AU
- Perihelion: 1.9746 AU
- Semi-major axis: 5.657 AU
- Eccentricity: 0.65096
- Orbital period: 13.45 years
- Inclination: 19.616°
- Longitude of ascending node: 357.77°
- Argument of periapsis: 168.74°
- Last perihelion: 6 July 2026
- Next perihelion: 14 December 2039
- T_{Jupiter}: 2.411
- Earth MOID: 0.961 AU
- Jupiter MOID: 1.308 AU

Physical characteristics
- Mean radius: 1.46 ± 0.03 km (0.907 ± 0.019 mi)
- Mean density: 660±80 kg/m^{3}
- Synodic rotation period: 14.0±2.0 hours
- Geometric albedo: 0.04 (assumed)
- Spectral type: (V–R) = 0.50±0.05
- Comet total magnitude (M1): 7.3
- Comet nuclear magnitude (M2): 14.3
- Apparent magnitude: 15 (2026-05-19)

63P/Wild is a Jupiter-family comet roughly 3 km in diameter with a 13.5-year orbit around the Sun. The comet reached perihelion on 6 July 2026.

== Observational history ==
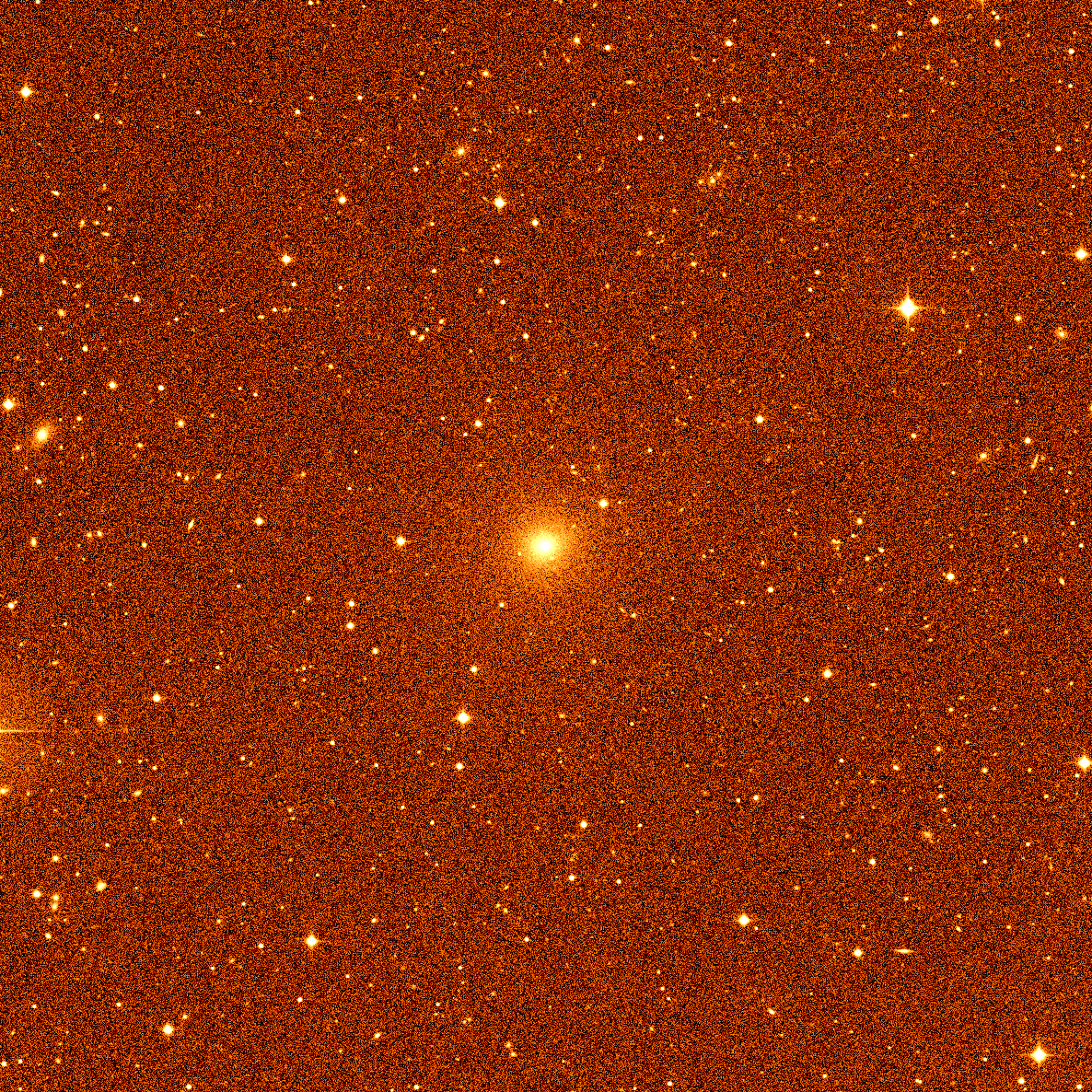
Comet 63P/Wild taken from the Palomar Transient Factory on 4 April 2013

It was first detected by Paul Wild at the Zimmerwald Observatory of the Astronomical Institute of Bern, Switzerland on a photographic plate exposed on 26 March 1960, who estimated its brightness at a magnitude of 14.3. Its elliptical orbit was then calculated to have an orbital period of 13.17 years.

Its predicted reappearance in 1973 was observed by Elizabeth Roemer of the U.S. Naval Observatory, Flagstaff, Arizona at a magnitude of 17.5. Although not found in 1986 it was rediscovered in 1999 with a magnitude of around 12. The 2013 return was moderately favourable with magnitude again around 12.

== Physical characteristics ==
The nucleus of the comet has a diameter of 2.92 km (1.81 mi), assuming a geometric albedo of 0.04.

== Notes ==
Numbered comets
Previous; 62P/Tsuchinshan	63P/Wild	Next; 64P/Swift–Gehrels
