= 1954 Kukarkin =

Slow-rotating main-belt asteroid

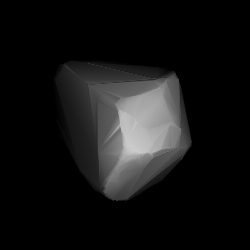
- Modelled shape of Kukarkin from its lightcurve

Discovery
- Discovered by: P. F. Shajn
- Discovery site: Simeiz Obs.
- Discovery date: 15 August 1952

Designations
- Named after: Boris Kukarkin (astronomer)
- Alternative designations: 1952 PH · 1957 QB
- Minor planet category: main-belt · (outer)

Orbital characteristics
- Epoch 4 September 2017 (JD 2458000.5)
- Uncertainty parameter 0
- Observation arc: 63.87 yr (23,327 days)
- Aphelion: 3.8543 AU
- Perihelion: 2.0177 AU
- Semi-major axis: 2.9360 AU
- Eccentricity: 0.3128
- Orbital period (sidereal): 5.03 yr (1,838 days)
- Mean anomaly: 324.18°
- Mean motion: 0° 11^{m} 45.24^{s} / day
- Inclination: 14.794°
- Longitude of ascending node: 278.02°
- Argument of perihelion: 70.427°

Physical characteristics
- Dimensions: 13.659±0.309 km 30.59 km (calculated)
- Synodic rotation period: 136.40±0.03 h
- Geometric albedo: 0.057 (assumed); 0.261±0.016
- Spectral type: C
- Absolute magnitude (H): 11.3 · 11.4

1954 Kukarkin (prov. designation: 1952 PH) is an asteroid and slow rotator on an eccentric orbit from the outer regions of the asteroid belt. It was discovered on 15 August 1952, by Russian astronomer Pelageya Shajn at Simeiz Observatory on the Crimean peninsula. The asteroid has a exceptionally long rotation period of 136.4 hours and measures approximately 30 kilometers (19 miles) in diameter. It was named after astronomer Boris Kukarkin.

== Orbit and classification ==
Kukarkin orbits the Sun in the outer main-belt at a distance of 2.0–3.9 AU once every 5.03 years (1,838 days). Its orbit has an eccentricity of 0.31 and an inclination of 15° with respect to the ecliptic. No precoveries were taken prior to its discovery.

== Naming ==
This minor planet is named after stellar astronomer Boris Vasilyevich Kukarkin (1909–1977), a well-known specialist for variable stars, the structure of stellar systems, and professor at Moscow State University. Kukarkin started and edited the General Catalogue of Variable Stars that was first published in 1948. He also served as vice-president of the Astronomical Council of Academy of Sciences of the USSR as well as of the International Astronomical Union and was the president of its Commission 27. The approved naming citation was published by the Minor Planet Center on 1 June 1980 (M.P.C. 5358).

== Physical characteristics ==
Kukarkin is a slow rotator, with a long period of 136.40±0.03 hours, measured at Los Algarrobos Observatory, Uruguay (I38) during a favorable opposition in 2012. The well-defined rotational lightcurve had brightness variation of 0.8±0.05 magnitude (U=3-).

While observations taken by NEOWISE gave an albedo of 0.2608±0.0155 and a diameter of 13.659±0.309 kilometers, the Collaborative Asteroid Lightcurve Link assumes a standard albedo for a carbonaceous C-type asteroid of 0.057 and calculates a significantly larger diameter of 30.6 kilometers, as the lower the albedo, the larger the body's diameter at a constant absolute magnitude.
