= 60P/Tsuchinshan =

Jupiter-family comet

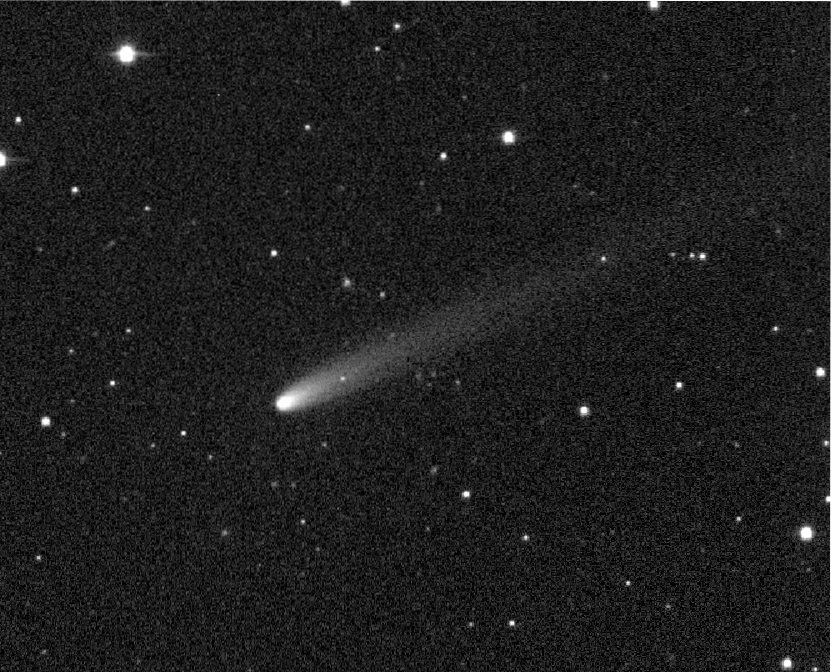
- Comet Tsuchinshan 2, imaged from the Zwicky Transient Facility on 4 January 2019

Discovery
- Discovery site: Purple Mountain Observatory
- Discovery date: 11 January 1965

Designations
- MPC designation: P/1965 A2, P/1971 S1
- Alternative designations: Tsuchinshan 2; 1965 II, 1971 X; 1978 XVI, 1985 X; 1992 XII

Orbital characteristics
- Epoch: 21 November 2025 (JD 2461000.5)
- Observation arc: 59.59 years
- Number of observations: 1,656
- Aphelion: 5.143 AU
- Perihelion: 1.646 AU
- Semi-major axis: 3.529 AU
- Eccentricity: 0.53369
- Orbital period: 6.63 years
- Inclination: 3.579°
- Longitude of ascending node: 267.39°
- Argument of periapsis: 216.91°
- Mean anomaly: 18.344°
- Last perihelion: 20 July 2025
- Next perihelion: 10 March 2032
- T_{Jupiter}: 2.864
- Earth MOID: 0.640 AU
- Jupiter MOID: 0.128 AU

Physical characteristics
- Mean radius: 0.69 km (0.43 mi)
- Spectral type: (B−V) = 0.78±0.15; (V−R) = 0.30±0.08
- Comet total magnitude (M1): 9.6
- Comet nuclear magnitude (M2): 14.9

60P/Tsuchinshan, also known as Tsuchinshan 2, is a Jupiter-family comet with an orbital period of around 6.63 years. Tsuchinshan is the Wade-Giles transliteration corresponding to the pinyin Zǐjīn Shān 紫金山, which is Mandarin Chinese for "Purple Mountain".

== Observational history ==
It was discovered at the Purple Mountain Observatory, Nanjing, China on 11 January 1965 with a magnitude estimated as a very faint 15. The elliptical orbit was computed to give a perihelion date of 9 February 1965 with an orbital period of 6.69 years. Revised calculations predicted the next perihelion would be on 28 November 1971 and Elizabeth Roemer of the University of Arizona successfully relocated the comet with the 154-cm reflector at Catalina. It was also observed in 1978, 1985, 1991–1992, and 1998–1999.

The comet peaked at about apparent magnitude 16.3 in 2012. On 29 December 2077, the comet will pass 0.068 AU (10.2 million km) from Mars.

== Physical characteristics ==
Initial estimates of the size of its nucleus place it around 0.5–0.8 km (0.31–0.50 mi) in radius. Photometric data of its absolute nuclear magnitude later revised this to 0.69 km (0.43 mi) in 2006. During its 2018–2019 apparition, dust production levels from Tsuchinshan 2 at perihelion were found to be significantly greater than other JFCs like 21P/Giacobini–Zinner, 41P/Tuttle–Giacobini–Kresak, and 103P/Hartley, although slightly lower than that of 67P/Churyumov–Gerasimenko. It saw increased cometary activity by 1.3 times when its perihelion was reduced by 0.15 AU (22 million km) after a close encounter with Jupiter in 2008.

Numbered comets
Previous; 59P/Kearns–Kwee	60P/Tsuchinshan	Next; 61P/Shajn–Schaldach
