= Derre Kwee =

Dutch footballer (born 1994)

Personal information
- Date of birth: 7 September 1994 (age 32)
- Place of birth: Losser, Netherlands
- Height: 1.77 m (5 ft 9 1/2 in)
- Position: Right back

Team information
- Current team: JOS
- Number: 18

Youth career
- Quick '20
- Twente

Senior career*
Years	Team	Apps	(Gls)
2013–2015	Twente	0	(0)
2013–2015	Jong Twente	48	(2)
2015–2016	Emmen	32	(1)
2016–2017	HHC Hardenberg	0	(0)
2017–2022	AFC	70	(3)
2022–	JOS	2	(0)
- * Club domestic league appearances and goals as of 21 November 2024

Derre Kwee (born 8 September 1994) is a Dutch footballer who plays as a right back for JOS.
