= Grigory Shajn =

Soviet astronomer (1892–1956)

Asteroids discovered: 3
1057 Wanda	August 16, 1925
1058 Grubba	June 22, 1925
1709 Ukraina	August 16, 1925

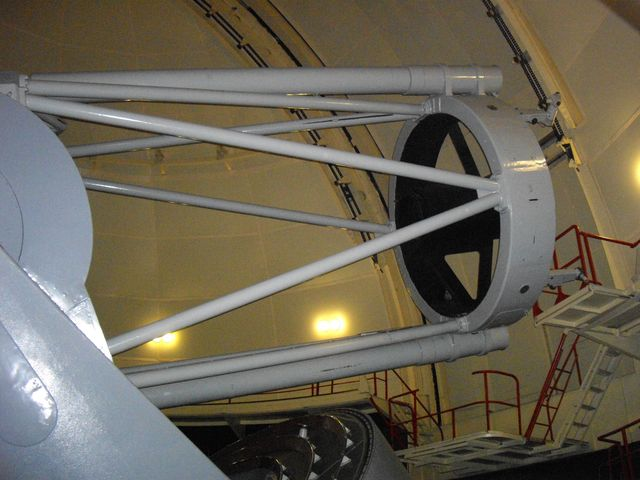
Large optical telescope is named after Shajn

Grigory Abramovich Shajn (Russian: Григорий Абрамович Шайн) (April 19, 1892 – August 4, 1956) was a Soviet/Russian astronomer. In modern English transliteration, his surname would be given as Shayn, but his astronomical discoveries are credited under the name G. Shajn. Nonetheless, his last name is sometimes given as Schayn.

He earned a masters degree from Tomsk University in 1920.

He was the husband of Pelageya Shajn (Пелагея Фёдоровна Шайн) née Sannikova (Санникова), who was also a Russian astronomer.

He worked on stellar spectroscopy and the physics of gaseous nebulas. Together with Otto Struve, he studied the rapid rotation of stars of young spectral types and measured the radial velocities of stars. He discovered new gaseous nebulas and the anomalous abundance of ^{13}C in stellar atmospheres.

He became a member of the Soviet Academy of Sciences in 1939, and was also a member of various foreign societies such as the Royal Astronomical Society. From 1945 to 1952 he was the director of the Crimean Astrophysical Observatory. In 1947, he was elected a Fellow of the American Academy of Arts and Sciences and received an honorary doctorate from the University of Copenhagen.

He also discovered a few asteroids. He also co-discovered the non-periodic comet C/1925 F1 (Shajn-Comas Solá), also known as Comet 1925 VI or Comet 1925a. However, the periodic comet 61P/Shajn–Schaldach was co-discovered by his wife rather than by him.

The crater Shayn on the Moon is named after him. He and his wife were also honoured by the minor planet 1648 Shajna.
