= 62P/Tsuchinshan =

Periodic comet with 6 year orbit

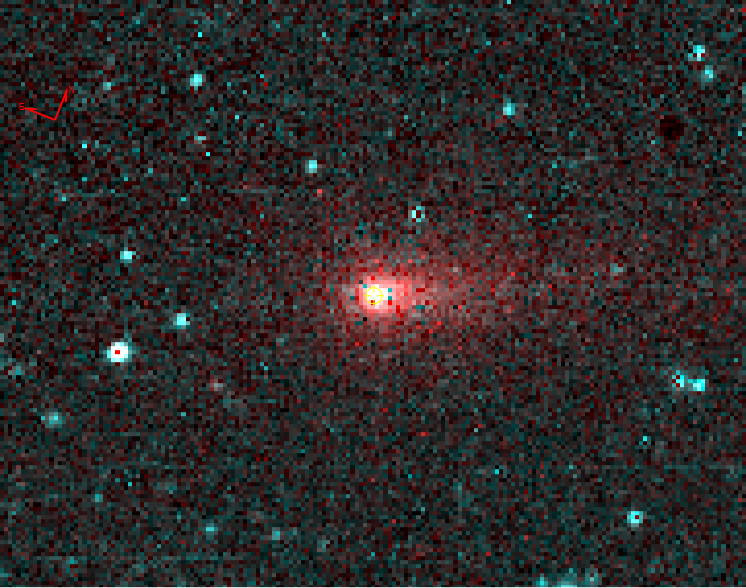
- Infrared image of Comet Tsuchinshan 1 taken by NEOWISE on 14 January 2018

Discovery
- Discovery site: Purple Mountain Observatory
- Discovery date: 1 January 1965

Designations
- MPC designation: P/1965 A1, P/1971 Y1
- Alternative designations: Tsuchinshan 1; 1965 I, 1971 VIII; 1978 IX, 1985 I; 1991 XIV

Orbital characteristics
- Epoch: 2024-01-11 (JD 2460320.5)
- Aphelion: 5.472 AU (Q)
- Perihelion: 1.265 AU (q)
- Semi-major axis: 3.369 AU (a)
- Eccentricity: 0.6245
- Orbital period: 6.18 yr
- Inclination: 10.50°
- Last perihelion: 25 December 2023
- Next perihelion: 5 March 2030

Physical characteristics
- Mean radius: 1.09 km (0.68 mi)
- Mean density: 480±80 kg/m^{3}

Perihelion distance at different epochs
Epoch	Perihelion (AU)
1800	2.45
1859	2.11
1882	2.04
1905	1.96
1965	1.49
2011	1.38
2023	1.26
2036	1.36
2094	1.21
2106	1.15

62P/Tsuchinshan, also known as Tsuchinshan 1, is a periodic comet first discovered January 1, 1965 at the Purple Mountain Observatory in Nanjing. It last came to perihelion on 25 December 2023 at around apparent magnitude 8, and was then 0.53 AU (79 million km) from Earth and 110 degrees from the Sun.

During the 2004 perihelion passage the comet brightened to about apparent magnitude 11. The comet was not observed during the 2011 unfavorable apparition since the perihelion passage occurred when the comet was on the far side of the Sun. During the 2023 apparition it brightened to 8th magnitude.

A close approach to Jupiter in 2020 made the comet a near-Earth object with perihelion less than 1.3 AU and the comet will remain a near-Earth object until a close approach to Jupiter in 2031. (Note: The JPL SBDB does not list it as a near-Earth object as JPL is using a epoch of 2017 to define the orbital parameters.)

On 2049 April 1 the comet will pass about 0.018 AU (2,700,000 km; 1,700,000 mi) from Mars.

62P/Tsuchinshan closest Mars approach on 2049-Apr-01
Date & time of closest approach	Mars distance (AU)	Sun distance (AU)	Velocity wrt Mars (km/s)	Velocity wrt Sun (km/s)	Uncertainty region (3-sigma)	Reference
2049-Apr-01 08:41 ± 9 minutes	0.0185 AU (2.77 million km; 1.72 million mi; 7.2 LD)	1.53 AU (229 million km; 142 million mi)	12.1	30.0	± 8 thousand km	Horizons

== See also ==
- List of numbered comets

== Notes ==
Numbered comets
Previous; 61P/Shajn–Schaldach	62P/Tsuchinshan	Next; 63P/Wild
