= 1112 Polonia =

Eoan asteroid

Discovery
- Discovered by: P. Shajn
- Discovery site: Simeiz Obs.
- Discovery date: 15 August 1928

Designations
- Pronunciation: /poʊˈloʊniə/
- Named after: Poland (European country)
- Alternative designations: 1928 PE · 1933 PA; A908 XA
- Minor planet category: main-belt · (outer); Eos

Orbital characteristics
- Epoch 23 March 2018 (JD 2458200.5)
- Uncertainty parameter 0
- Observation arc: 89.20 yr (32,582 d)
- Aphelion: 3.3423 AU
- Perihelion: 2.6963 AU
- Semi-major axis: 3.0193 AU
- Eccentricity: 0.1070
- Orbital period (sidereal): 5.25 yr (1,916 d)
- Mean anomaly: 326.70°
- Mean motion: 0° 11^{m} 16.44^{s} / day
- Inclination: 8.9911°
- Longitude of ascending node: 302.86°
- Argument of perihelion: 87.361°

Physical characteristics
- Mean diameter: 35.76±1.6 km 37.55±0.60 km 39.661±0.334 km 47.058±0.368 km
- Synodic rotation period: 82.5±0.5 h (Note: Lightcurve plot of 1(1112) Polonia, Palmer Divide Observatory, B. D. Warner (2007). Rotation period 82.5±0.5 hours with a brightness amplitude of 0.20±0.03 mag. Quality code is 2. Summary figures at the LCDB.)
- Geometric albedo: 0.0763±0.0097; 0.097±0.023; 0.128±0.005; 0.1319±0.012
- Spectral type: S (Tholen); L (SDSS-MOC); B–V = 0.797; U–B = 0.447
- Absolute magnitude (H): 10.05

1112 Polonia (provisional designation 1928 PE) is an Eoan asteroid from the outer regions of the asteroid belt, approximately 38 kilometers (24 miles) in diameter. Discovered by Soviet astronomer Pelageya Shajn at Simeiz in 1928, it was the first asteroid discovery made by a woman. The L-type asteroid has a long rotation period of 82.5 hours, and was named for the country of Poland.

== Discovery ==
Polonia was first observed as A908 XA at the German Heidelberg Observatory in December 1908. It was officially discovered on 15 August 1928, by Soviet astronomer Pelageya Shajn at the Simeiz Observatory on the Crimean peninsula. On the following night at Simeis, it was independently discovered by her college Grigory Neujmin. The Minor Planet Center only recognized the first discoverer.

Polonia was Shajn's first discovery; and the first asteroid discovery made by a woman, bringing a long-standing tradition – which began with the discovery of 1 Ceres in 1801 – of more than a thousand minor planet discoveries exclusively made by male astronomers, to an end.

== Orbit and classification ==
Polonia is a core member of the Eos family (606), the largest asteroid family of the outer main belt consisting of nearly 10,000 asteroids.

It orbits the Sun at a distance of 2.7–3.3 AU once every 5 years and 3 months (1,916 days; semi-major axis of 3.02 AU). Its orbit has an eccentricity of 0.11 and an inclination of 9° with respect to the ecliptic. The body's observation arc begins with its official discovery observation at Simeiz in 1928.

== Physical characteristics ==
In the Tholen classification, Polonia is a common, stony S-type asteroid. In the more refined SDSS-based taxonomy, it is characterized as an uncommon L-type, which is similar to a K-type, the overall spectral type of the Eoan asteroids.

=== Rotation period ===
In October 2007, a rotational lightcurve of Polonia was obtained from photometric observations by American astronomer Brian Warner at his Palmer Divide Observatory in Colorado. Lightcurve analysis gave a long rotation period of 82.5 hours with a brightness amplitude of 0.20 magnitude (U=2). The asteroid's long period is close to that of a slow rotator.

=== Diameter and albedo ===
According to the surveys carried out by the Infrared Astronomical Satellite IRAS, the Japanese Akari satellite and the NEOWISE mission of NASA's Wide-field Infrared Survey Explorer, Polonia measures between 35.76 and 47.058 kilometers in diameter and its surface has an albedo between 0.0763 and 0.1319. The Collaborative Asteroid Lightcurve Link adopts the results obtained by IRAS, that is, an albedo of 0.1319 and a diameter of 35.76 kilometers based on an absolute magnitude of 10.05.

== Naming ==
This minor planet was named "Polonia", the Latin name for the European country of Poland. It is the first minor planet discovery made by a woman. The naming was proposed by L. Matkiewicz, an astronomer of Polish origin, who calculated the body's orbit. The official citation was mentioned in The Names of the Minor Planets by Paul Herget in 1955 (H 104).
