= 59P/Kearns–Kwee =

Jupiter-family comet

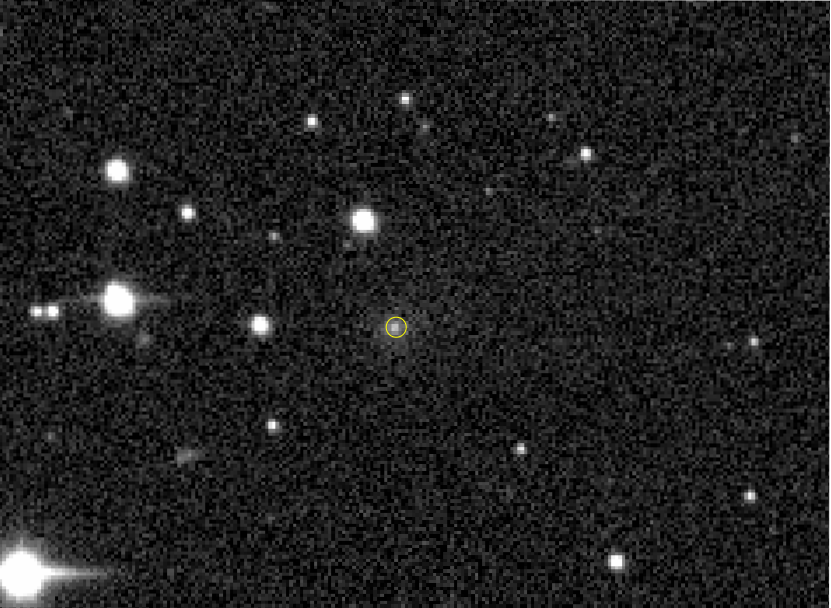
- Comet Kearns–Kwee photographed from the Zwicky Transient Facility on 31 January 2019

Discovery
- Discovered by: Charles E. Kearns; Kiem King Kwee
- Discovery site: Palomar Observatory
- Discovery date: 17 August 1963

Designations
- MPC designation: P/1963 Q1, P/1971 O1
- Alternative designations: 1963 VIII, 1972 XI; 1981 XX, 1990 XXV; 1963d, 1971c, 1981h; 1989u

Orbital characteristics
- Epoch: 25 February 2023 (JD 2460000.5)
- Observation arc: 55.62 years
- Number of observations: 1,849
- Aphelion: 6.618 AU
- Perihelion: 2.348 AU
- Semi-major axis: 4.483 AU
- Eccentricity: 0.47617
- Orbital period: 9.492 years
- Inclination: 9.344°
- Longitude of ascending node: 312.79°
- Argument of periapsis: 127.52°
- Mean anomaly: 168.35°
- Last perihelion: 16 September 2018
- Next perihelion: 15 March 2028
- T_{Jupiter}: 2.771
- Earth MOID: 1.381 AU
- Jupiter MOID: 0.006 AU

Physical characteristics
- Mean radius: 0.79 ± 0.03 km (0.491 ± 0.019 mi)
- Mean density: 400±60 kg/m^{3}
- Geometric albedo: 0.04 (assumed)
- Spectral type: (V–R) = 0.50±0.05; (R–I) = 0.42±0.04
- Absolute magnitude (H): 19.17
- Comet total magnitude (M1): 10.4
- Comet nuclear magnitude (M2): 14.7

59P/Kearns–Kwee is a periodic comet in the Solar System with a current orbital period of 9.49 years.

== Observational history ==
It was discovered by Charles E. Kearns and Kiem King Kwee on a photographic plate taken on 17 August 1963 during a search for the then-lost comet 55P/Tempel–Tuttle, and was later confirmed by Elizabeth Roemer at the US Naval Observatory Flagstaff Station in Arizona. She estimated its brightness at a faint magnitude of 16. The perihelion was initially calculated as 28 October 1963 and the periodicity as 8.48 years, but calculations based on further observations revised the data to 7 December and 8.95 years.

The 1972 apparition was observed by Elizabeth Roemer and L. M. Vaughn of the University of Arizona, using the 229-cm reflector at Kitt Peak as early as 26 July 1971. It was relocated in 1981 by Tsutomu Seki of Japan and again on 10 September 1989 by J. Gibson at Palomar Observatory. It was also successfully re-observed in 1999 and 2009.

== Physical characteristics ==
The nucleus of the comet has an effective radius of 0.79±0.03 km, assuming a geometric albedo of 0.04.

== See also ==
- List of numbered comets

Numbered comets
Previous; 58P/Jackson–Neujmin	59P/Kearns–Kwee	Next; 60P/Tsuchinshan
