= C/1925 F1 (Shajn–Comas Solá) =

Parabolic comet

C/1925 F1 (Shajn–Comas Sola)
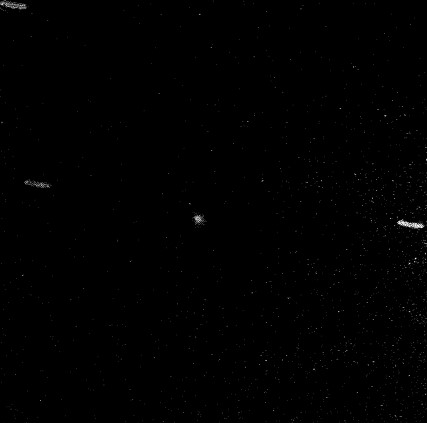
- Comet Shajn–Comas Sola photographed by George van Biesbroeck from the Yerkes Observatory on 26 March 1925

Discovery
- Discovered by: Grigory Shajn; Josep Comas Solá
- Discovery site: Simeis Observatory, USSR; Fabra Observatory, Spain
- Discovery date: 22–23 March 1925

Designations
- Alternative designations: 1925 VI, 1925a

Orbital characteristics
- Epoch: 7 September 1925 (JD 2424400.5)
- Observation arc: 711 days (1.95 years)
- Number of observations: 59
- Perihelion: 4.181 AU
- Eccentricity: 1.002432
- Orbital period: 4.8 million years (inbound); 691,000 years (outbound)
- Inclination: 146.71°
- Longitude of ascending node: 358.54°
- Argument of periapsis: 205.76°
- Last perihelion: 6 September 1925

Physical characteristics
- Comet total magnitude (M1): 2.5
- Apparent magnitude: 10.8 (1925 apparition)

Comet Shajn–Comas Solá, formal designation C/1925 F1, is a non-periodic comet co-discovered by Grigory Shajn and Josep Comas Solá in 1925. At the time, it was the comet with the most distant known perihelion distance (until the discovery of 29P/Schwassmann–Wachmann two years later), which enabled astronomers to continue observing it until March 1927.

== Observational history ==
=== Discovery ===
The comet was first spotted by accident from the Simeis Observatory in Crimea by Soviet astronomer, Grigory Shajn, on 22 March 1925. Having just recently transferred from the Pulkovo Observatory, Shajn was not used to operating the telescope at Simeis at the time, hence pointing the instrument to the wrong direction in his first trial run. He noticed a diffuse 11th-magnitude object in an erroneous photographic plate where he recognized it as a comet. In a letter he wrote to George van Biesbroeck, he later recalled:

"Had I not made the mistake in guiding, the trail of the comet would have had nearly the same length as the star trails, and I doubt that I would have distinguished it from a star."

Shortly afterwards, the comet was independently discovered by Spanish astronomer, Josep Comas Solá, from the Fabra Observatory in Barcelona, Spain on 23 March 1925, but was unable to confirm his discovery until March 25th.

== Orbit ==
At the time of discovery, the comet was located within the constellation of Virgo. (Note: Reported initial position upon discovery was: α = 11^{h} 51.3^{m} , δ = 1° 34′) It was also three days before its closest approach with Earth and almost five months before perihelion. Due to its very slow motion across the sky, the comet's orbit was initially difficult to determine.

Howard B. Kaster and Katherine Prescott determined a perihelion date of 17 September 1925 and a perihelion distance of 4.14 AU (619 million km). Additional parabolic orbits were later calculated by Gerald Merton, Hermann Kobold and others.

In 1973, Brian G. Marsden and Zdenek Sekanina revised it to a hyperbolic trajectory that is weakly bound to the barycenter of the Solar System, where they concluded that the comet reached perihelion on 6 September 1925 and had an inbound orbital period of 4.8 million years, later shortened to 683,000 years on its outbound flight. This was revised yet again in 1978, with an orbital period of 4.6 million years (inbound) and 691,000 years (outbound).

== See also ==
- C/1925 G1 (Orkisz)
- C/1925 V1 (Wilk–Peltier)
- C/2014 UN_{271} (Bernardinelli–Bernstein)
