= Palomar–Leiden survey =

Astronomical survey

- Alternative names: PLS

Minor planets discovered: 4637
see § List of discovered minor planets

The Palomar–Leiden survey (PLS) was a successful astronomical survey to study faint minor planets in a collaboration between the U.S Palomar Observatory and the Dutch Leiden Observatory, and resulted in the discovery of thousands of asteroids, including many Jupiter trojans.

The original PLS-survey took place in 1960, and was followed by three Palomar–Leiden Trojan survey campaigns, launched in 1971, 1973 and 1977. Its principal investigators were the astronomers Ingrid and Cornelis van Houten at Leiden and Tom Gehrels at Palomar. For the period of the entire survey (1960–1977), the trio of astronomers are credited with the discovery of 4,637 numbered minor planets, which received their own provisional designation, such as 6344 P-L, 4835 T-1 and 3181 T-2.

PLS was one of the most productive minor planet surveys ever conducted: five new asteroid families were discovered, gaps at 1:3 and 2:5 orbital resonances with Jupiter were revealed, and hundreds of photographic plates were taken with Palomar's Samuel Oschin telescope. These plates are still used in their digitized form for the precovery of minor planets today.

== Summary ==
Approximately 5,500 minor planets were discovered during the Palomar–Leiden survey and its subsequent Trojan campaigns. A total of 4,622 minor planets have been numbered so far and are directly credited to the survey's principal investigators – Cornelis Johannes van Houten, Ingrid van Houten-Groeneveld and Tom Gehrels – by the Minor Planet Center (see § List of discovered minor planets), which is responsible for the designation of minor bodies in the Solar System. Discoveries included members of the Hungaria and Hilda family, which are asteroids from the inner- and outermost regions of the asteroid belt, respectively, as well as a large number of Jupiter trojans.

- P-L Palomar–Leiden survey (1960), discovered more than 2,000 asteroids (1,800 with orbital information) in eleven nights. This number was increased to 2,400 including 19 Trojans after further analysis of the plates. A total of 130 photographic plates were taken.
- T-1 the first Palomar–Leiden Trojan survey (1971), discovered approximately 500 asteroids including 4 Jupiter trojans in nine nights. A total of 54 photographic plates were taken.
- T-2 the second Palomar–Leiden Trojan survey (1973), discovered another 1,200 asteroids including 18 Jupiter trojans in eight nights. A total of 78 photographic plates were taken.
- T-3 the third Palomar–Leiden Trojan survey (1977), discovered an additional 1,400 asteroids including 24 Jupiter trojans in seven nights. A total of 68 photographic plates were taken.

== Naming ==
The discovered bodies received a custom provisional designation. For example, the asteroid 2040 P-L is the 2040th minor planet in the original Palomar–Leiden survey, while the asteroid 4835 T-1 was discovered during the first Trojan-campaign. The majority of these bodies have since been assigned a number and many are already named. The custom identifier in the provisional designation "P-L" stands for "Palomar–Leiden", named after Palomar Observatory and Leiden Observatory. For the three Trojan campaigns, the survey designation prefixes "T-1", "T-2" and "T-3" stand for "Trojan".

== Surveys ==
The PLS was originally intended as an extension of the Yerkes–McDonald asteroid survey (1950–1952), which was initiated by Dutch–American astronomer Gerard Kuiper. While this survey was limited to a magnitude of up to 16, PLS could study minor planets up to a visual magnitudes of 20. However, it only covered a portion of the ecliptic about the vernal equinox, with the target areas selected to minimize the number of background stars.

Photographic plates taken by Tom Gehrels at the Lunar and Planetary Laboratory in Arizona using the 48-inch Schmidt camera at Palomar Observatory. The orbital elements were computed at the Cincinnati Observatory, which was the site of the Minor Planet Center at the time. All other aspects of the program were conducted at Leiden Observatory in the Netherlands.

=== Original PLS-survey ===
During September and October 1960, the first 130 photographic plates were taken, with each plate spanning 35.6 × 35.6 cm and having a limiting magnitude of 20.5. The observed region covered an area of 36° × 18°. The Zeiss blink comparator from the Heidelberg Observatory was adapted to perform blink comparison of the plates. This resulted in the discovery of a large number of asteroids; typically 200–400 per plate. A subset of these objects had sufficient data to allow orbital elements to be computed. The mean error in their positions was as small as 0.6″, which corresponded to 0.009 mm on the plates. The resulting mean error in magnitude estimation was 0.19.

=== Trojan surveys ===
The third Palomar–Leiden Trojan survey was performed in 1977, resulting in the discovery of 26 Jupiter trojans. In total, there were three Trojan campaigns, designated T-1, T-2, and T-3, which discovered 3570 asteroids. Another small extension of the survey was reported in 1984, adding 170 new objects for a combined total of 2,403.

== List of discovered minor planets ==
List of minor planets

1743 Schmidt	24 September 1960
1744 Harriet	24 September 1960
1776 Kuiper	24 September 1960
1777 Gehrels	24 September 1960
1778 Alfvén	26 September 1960
1795 Woltjer	24 September 1960
1808 Bellerophon	24 September 1960
1809 Prometheus	24 September 1960
1810 Epimetheus	24 September 1960
1811 Bruwer	24 September 1960
1812 Gilgamesh	24 September 1960
1813 Imhotep	17 October 1960
1846 Bengt	24 September 1960
1868 Thersites	24 September 1960
1869 Philoctetes	24 September 1960
1870 Glaukos	24 March 1971
1871 Astyanax	24 March 1971
1872 Helenos	24 March 1971
1873 Agenor	25 March 1971
1912 Anubis	24 September 1960
1923 Osiris	24 September 1960
1924 Horus	24 September 1960
1964 Luyten	24 September 1960
1965 van de Kamp	24 September 1960
1966 Tristan	24 September 1960

1979 Sakharov	24 September 1960
2003 Harding	24 September 1960
2041 Lancelot	24 September 1960
2042 Sitarski	24 September 1960
2054 Gawain	24 September 1960
2082 Galahad	17 October 1960
2095 Parsifal	24 September 1960
2125 Karl-Ontjes	24 September 1960
2154 Underhill	24 September 1960
2155 Wodan	24 September 1960
2176 Donar	24 September 1960
2177 Oliver	24 September 1960
2200 Pasadena	24 September 1960
2210 Lois	24 September 1960
2224 Tucson	24 September 1960
2225 Serkowski	24 September 1960
2247 Hiroshima	24 September 1960
2256 Wiśniewski	24 September 1960
2289 McMillan	24 September 1960
2317 Galya	24 September 1960
2318 Lubarsky	24 September 1960
2319 Aristides	17 October 1960
2339 Anacreon	24 September 1960
2412 Wil	17 October 1960
2413 van de Hulst	24 September 1960

2435 Horemheb	24 September 1960
2436 Hatshepsut	24 September 1960
2462 Nehalennia	24 September 1960
2471 Ultrajectum	24 September 1960
2495 Noviomagum	17 October 1960
2662 Kandinsky	24 September 1960
2663 Miltiades	24 September 1960
2782 Leonidas	24 September 1960
2798 Vergilius	24 September 1960
2799 Justus	25 September 1960
2800 Ovidius	24 September 1960
2818 Juvenalis	24 September 1960
2823 van der Laan	24 September 1960
2876 Aeschylus	24 September 1960
2921 Sophocles	24 September 1960
2930 Euripides	24 September 1960
2934 Aristophanes	25 September 1960
2940 Bacon	24 September 1960
2986 Mrinalini	24 September 1960
2987 Sarabhai	24 September 1960
2992 Vondel	24 September 1960
3046 Molière	24 September 1960
3047 Goethe	24 September 1960
3079 Schiller	24 September 1960
3091 van den Heuvel	24 September 1960

3092 Herodotus	24 September 1960
3097 Tacitus	24 September 1960
3098 van Sprang	24 September 1960
3164 Prast	24 September 1960
3201 Sijthoff	24 September 1960
3218 Delphine	24 September 1960
3226 Plinius	24 September 1960
3244 Petronius	24 September 1960
3251 Eratosthenes	24 September 1960
3279 Solon	17 October 1960
3290 Azabu	19 September 1973
3292 Sather	24 September 1960
3293 Rontaylor	24 September 1960
3294 Carlvesely	24 September 1960
3377 Lodewijk	24 September 1960
3538 Nelsonia	24 September 1960
3548 Eurybates	19 September 1973
3604 Berkhuijsen	17 October 1960
3664 Anneres	24 September 1960
3734 Waland	17 October 1960
3798 de Jager	16 October 1977
3868 Mendoza	24 September 1960
3877 Braes	24 September 1960
3936 Elst	16 October 1977
4007 Euryalos	19 September 1973

4043 Perolof	17 October 1977
4044 Erikhøg	16 October 1977
4064 Marjorie	24 September 1960
4065 Meinel	24 September 1960
4068 Menestheus	19 September 1973
4108 Rakos	16 October 1977
4138 Kalchas	19 September 1973
4161 Amasis	24 September 1960
4180 Anaxagoras	24 September 1960
4230 van den Bergh	19 September 1973
4294 Horatius	24 September 1960
4295 Wisse	24 September 1960
4354 Euclides	24 September 1960
4355 Memphis	17 October 1960
4356 Marathon	17 October 1960
4357 Korinthos	29 September 1973
4385 Elsässer	24 September 1960
4386 Lüst	26 September 1960
4387 Tanaka	19 September 1973
4412 Chephren	26 September 1960
4413 Mycerinos	24 September 1960
4414 Sesostris	24 September 1960
4415 Echnaton	24 September 1960
4416 Ramses	24 September 1960
4548 Wielen	24 September 1960

4549 Burkhardt	29 September 1973
4586 Gunvor	24 September 1960
4587 Rees	30 September 1973
4646 Kwee	24 September 1960
4721 Atahualpa	29 September 1973
4722 Agelaos	16 October 1977
4752 Myron	29 September 1973
4753 Phidias	16 October 1977
4754 Panthoos	16 October 1977
4757 Liselotte	19 September 1973
4846 Tuthmosis	24 September 1960
4847 Amenhotep	24 September 1960
4848 Tutenchamun	30 September 1973
4876 Strabo	29 September 1973
4877 Humboldt	25 September 1973
4906 Seneferu	24 September 1960
4907 Zoser	17 October 1960
4960 Mayo	24 September 1960
4977 Rauthgundis	24 September 1960
4978 Seitz	29 September 1973
5009 Sethos	24 September 1960
5010 Amenemhêt	24 September 1960
5011 Ptah	24 September 1960
5012 Eurymedon	17 October 1960
5037 Habing	24 September 1960

5041 Theotes	19 September 1973
5071 Schoenmaker	30 September 1973
5148 Giordano	17 October 1960
5149 Leibniz	24 September 1960
5150 Fellini	17 October 1960
5151 Weerstra	29 September 1973
5194 Böttger	24 September 1960
5195 Kaendler	26 March 1971
5196 Bustelli	30 September 1973
5197 Rottmann	29 September 1973
5243 Clasien	29 September 1973
5244 Amphilochos	29 September 1973
5265 Schadow	24 September 1960
5266 Rauch	29 September 1973
5296 Friedrich	17 October 1960
5297 Schinkel	29 September 1973
5340 Burton	24 September 1960
5341 Purgathofer	24 September 1960
5342 Le Poole	30 September 1973
5383 Leavitt	29 September 1973
5408 Thé	25 March 1971
5450 Sokrates	24 September 1960
5451 Plato	24 September 1960
5490 Burbidge	24 September 1960
5491 Kaulbach	26 March 1971

5492 Thoma	26 March 1971
5493 Spitzweg	24 September 1973
5529 Perry	24 September 1960
5530 Eisinga	24 September 1960
5531 Carolientje	29 September 1973
5610 Balster	16 October 1977
5655 Barney	29 September 1973
5694 Berényi	24 September 1960
5695 Remillieux	24 September 1960
5696 Ibsen	24 September 1960
5697 Arrhenius	24 September 1960
5698 Nolde	26 March 1971
5699 Munch	16 October 1977
5700 Homerus	16 October 1977
5756 Wassenbergh	24 September 1960
5789 Sellin	24 September 1960
5790 Nagasaki	17 October 1960
5791 Comello	29 September 1973
5837 Hedin	24 September 1960
5838 Hamsun	29 September 1973
5884 Dolezal	24 September 1960
5885 Apeldoorn	30 September 1973
5928 Pindarus	19 September 1973
5981 Kresilas	24 September 1960
5982 Polykletus	13 May 1971

5983 Praxiteles	29 September 1973
5984 Lysippus	16 October 1977
6054 Ghiberti	24 September 1960
6055 Brunelleschi	16 October 1977
6056 Donatello	16 October 1977
6057 Robbia	16 October 1977
6072 Hooghoudt	25 March 1971
6105 Verrocchio	24 September 1960
6106 Stoss	24 September 1960
6145 Riemenschneider	26 September 1960
6146 Adamkrafft	30 September 1973
6147 Straub	17 October 1977
6148 Ignazgünther	16 October 1977
6202 Georgemiley	26 March 1971
6213 Zwiers	24 September 1960
6256 Canova	24 September 1960
6257 Thorvaldsen	26 March 1971
6258 Rodin	30 September 1973
6259 Maillol	30 September 1973
6350 Schlüter	17 October 1960
6351 Neumann	26 March 1971
6352 Schlaun	16 October 1977
6353 Semper	16 October 1977
6428 Barlach	17 October 1960
6429 Brancusi	26 March 1971

6504 Lehmbruck	24 September 1960
6535 Archipenko	17 October 1960
6571 Sigmund	24 September 1960
6614 Antisthenes	24 September 1960
6615 Plutarchos	17 October 1960
6616 Plotinos	25 March 1971
6617 Boethius	25 March 1971
6672 Corot	24 March 1971
6673 Degas	25 March 1971
6674 Cézanne	26 March 1971
6675 Sisley	29 September 1973
6676 Monet	29 September 1973
6677 Renoir	16 October 1977
6678 Seurat	16 October 1977
6749 Ireentje	17 October 1960
6750 Katgert	24 March 1971
6751 van Genderen	25 March 1971
6752 Ashley	26 March 1971
6805 Abstracta	24 September 1960
6806 Kaufmann	24 September 1960
6807 Brünnow	24 September 1960
6841 Gottfriedkirch	24 September 1960
6842 Krosigk	24 September 1960
6884 Takeshisato	17 October 1960
6885 Nitardy	17 October 1960

6935 Morisot	24 September 1960
6936 Cassatt	24 September 1960
6937 Valadon	29 September 1973
6938 Soniaterk	25 September 1973
6996 Alvensleben	29 September 1973
6997 Laomedon	16 October 1977
6998 Tithonus	16 October 1977
6999 Meitner	16 October 1977
7040 Harwood	24 September 1960
7041 Nantucket	24 September 1960
7100 Martin Luther	29 September 1973
7146 Konradin	24 September 1960
7147 Feijth	24 September 1960
7148 Reinholdbien	25 March 1971
7149 Bernie	16 October 1977
7152 Euneus	19 September 1973
7207 Hammurabi	24 September 1960
7208 Ashurbanipal	24 September 1960
7209 Cyrus	17 October 1960
7210 Darius	24 September 1960
7211 Xerxes	25 March 1971
7212 Artaxerxes	29 September 1973
7214 Anticlus	19 September 1973
7265 Edithmüller	30 September 1973
7266 Trefftz	29 September 1973

7313 Pisano	24 September 1960
7314 Pevsner	25 March 1971
7315 Kolbe	29 September 1973
7316 Hajdu	30 September 1973
7367 Giotto	26 March 1971
7445 Trajanus	24 September 1960
7446 Hadrianus	29 September 1973
7447 Marcusaurelius	17 October 1977
7506 Lub	24 September 1960
7507 Israel	17 October 1960
7508 Icke	16 October 1977
7541 Nieuwenhuis	16 October 1977
7543 Prylis	19 September 1973
7620 Willaert	24 September 1960
7621 Sweelinck	24 September 1960
7622 Pergolesi	24 September 1960
7623 Stamitz	17 October 1960
7624 Gluck	25 March 1971
7625 Louisspohr	29 September 1973
7686 Wolfernst	24 September 1960
7687 Matthias	24 September 1960
7688 Lothar	24 September 1960
7689 Reinerstoss	24 September 1960
7690 Sackler	25 March 1971
7691 Brady	16 October 1977

7720 Lepaute	26 September 1960
7721 Andrillat	24 September 1960
7722 Firneis	29 September 1973
7804 Boesgaard	24 September 1960
7805 Moons	17 October 1960
7852 Itsukushima	17 October 1960
7853 Confucius	29 September 1973
7854 Laotse	17 October 1977
7855 Tagore	16 October 1977
7906 Melanchton	24 September 1960
7907 Erasmus	24 September 1960
7908 Zwingli	26 March 1971
7970 Lichtenberg	24 September 1960
7971 Meckbach	17 October 1960
7972 Mariotti	25 March 1971
7973 Koppeschaar	29 September 1973
7974 Vermeesch	29 September 1973
8052 Novalis	24 September 1960
8053 Kleist	25 September 1960
8054 Brentano	24 September 1960
8055 Arnim	17 October 1960
8056 Tieck	24 September 1960
8057 Hofmannsthal	26 March 1971
8058 Zuckmayer	16 October 1977
8060 Anius	19 September 1973

8121 Altdorfer	24 September 1960
8122 Holbein	24 September 1960
8123 Canaletto	26 March 1971
8124 Guardi	26 March 1971
8125 Tyndareus	30 September 1973
8235 Fragonard	24 September 1960
8236 Gainsborough	24 September 1960
8237 Constable	17 October 1960
8238 Courbet	26 March 1971
8239 Signac	29 September 1973
8240 Matisse	29 September 1973
8241 Agrius	19 September 1973
8316 Wolkenstein	24 September 1960
8317 Eurysaces	24 September 1960
8318 Averroes	29 September 1973
8319 Antiphanes	25 September 1973
8433 Brachyrhynchus	24 September 1960
8434 Columbianus	24 September 1960
8435 Anser	26 September 1960
8436 Leucopsis	25 March 1971
8437 Bernicla	26 March 1971
8438 Marila	13 May 1971
8439 Albellus	29 September 1973
8440 Wigeon	17 October 1977
8441 Lapponica	16 October 1977

8442 Ostralegus	16 October 1977
8443 Svecica	16 October 1977
8585 Purpurea	24 September 1960
8586 Epops	24 September 1960
8587 Ruficollis	25 September 1960
8588 Avosetta	24 September 1960
8589 Stellaris	24 September 1960
8590 Pygargus	24 September 1960
8591 Excubitor	24 September 1960
8592 Rubetra	25 March 1971
8593 Angustirostris	25 March 1971
8594 Albifrons	25 March 1971
8595 Dougallii	26 March 1971
8596 Alchata	29 September 1973
8597 Sandvicensis	29 September 1973
8598 Tetrix	29 September 1973
8599 Riparia	29 September 1973
8600 Arundinaceus	30 September 1973
8601 Ciconia	30 September 1973
8602 Oedicnemus	16 October 1977
8603 Senator	16 October 1977
8750 Nettarufina	24 September 1960
8751 Nigricollis	24 September 1960
8752 Flammeus	24 September 1960
8753 Nycticorax	24 September 1960

8754 Leucorodia	24 September 1960
8755 Querquedula	24 September 1960
8756 Mollissima	24 September 1960
8757 Cyaneus	24 September 1960
8758 Perdix	24 September 1960
8759 Porzana	17 October 1960
8760 Crex	25 March 1971
8761 Crane	25 March 1971
8762 Hiaticula	26 March 1971
8763 Pugnax	26 March 1971
8764 Gallinago	29 September 1973
8765 Limosa	29 September 1973
8766 Niger	29 September 1973
8767 Commontern	29 September 1973
8768 Barnowl	29 September 1973
8769 Arctictern	29 September 1973
8770 Totanus	30 September 1973
8771 Biarmicus	30 September 1973
8772 Minutus	29 September 1973
8773 Torquilla	25 September 1973
8774 Viridis	25 September 1973
8775 Cristata	30 September 1973
8776 Campestris	16 October 1977
8777 Torquata	16 October 1977
8959 Oenanthe	24 September 1960

8960 Luscinioides	24 September 1960
8961 Schoenobaenus	24 September 1960
8962 Noctua	24 September 1960
8963 Collurio	24 September 1960
8964 Corax	17 October 1960
8965 Citrinella	17 October 1960
8966 Hortulana	26 March 1971
8967 Calandra	13 May 1971
8968 Europaeus	29 September 1973
8969 Alexandrinus	29 September 1973
8970 Islandica	29 September 1973
8971 Leucocephala	29 September 1973
8972 Sylvatica	29 September 1973
8973 Pratincola	30 September 1973
8974 Gregaria	25 September 1973
8975 Atthis	29 September 1973
8976 Leucura	29 September 1973
8977 Paludicola	29 September 1973
8978 Barbatus	16 October 1977
8979 Clanga	16 October 1977
8980 Heliaca	16 October 1977
9132 Walteranderson	24 September 1960
9133 d'Arrest	25 September 1960
9134 Encke	24 September 1960
9135 Lacaille	17 October 1960

9136 Lalande	13 May 1971
9137 Remo	29 September 1973
9138 Murdoch	29 September 1973
9139 Barrylasker	29 September 1973
9140 Deni	16 October 1977
9141 Kapur	16 October 1977
9142 Rhesus	16 October 1977
9248 Sauer	24 September 1960
9249 Yen	24 September 1960
9250 Chamberlin	24 September 1960
9251 Harch	26 September 1960
9252 Goddard	17 October 1960
9253 Oberth	25 March 1971
9254 Shunkai	25 March 1971
9255 Inoutadataka	26 March 1971
9256 Tsukamoto	29 September 1973
9257 Kunisuke	24 September 1973
9258 Johnpauljones	29 September 1973
9259 Janvanparadijs	29 September 1973
9478 Caldeyro	24 September 1960
9479 Madresplazamayo	26 September 1960
9480 Inti	24 September 1960
9481 Menchú	24 September 1960
9482 Rubéndarío	24 September 1960
9483 Chagas	24 September 1960

9484 Wanambi	24 September 1960
9485 Uluru	24 September 1960
9486 Utemorrah	24 September 1960
9487 Kupe	17 October 1960
9488 Huia	24 September 1960
9489 Tanemahuta	25 March 1971
9490 Gosemeijer	25 March 1971
9491 Thooft	25 March 1971
9492 Veltman	25 March 1971
9493 Enescu	26 March 1971
9494 Donici	26 March 1971
9495 Eminescu	26 March 1971
9496 Ockels	26 March 1971
9497 Dwingeloo	29 September 1973
9498 Westerbork	29 September 1973
9499 Excalibur	29 September 1973
9500 Camelot	29 September 1973
9501 Ywain	29 September 1973
9502 Gaimar	29 September 1973
9503 Agrawain	29 September 1973
9504 Lionel	29 September 1973
9505 Lohengrin	29 September 1973
9506 Telramund	25 September 1973
9507 Gottfried	30 September 1973
9508 Titurel	16 October 1977

9509 Amfortas	16 October 1977
9510 Gurnemanz	16 October 1977
9511 Klingsor	16 October 1977
9676 Eijkman	24 September 1960
9677 Gowlandhopkins	24 September 1960
9678 van der Meer	24 September 1960
9679 Crutzen	24 September 1960
9680 Molina	22 October 1960
9681 Sherwoodrowland	24 September 1960
9682 Gravesande	24 September 1960
9683 Rambaldo	24 September 1960
9684 Olieslagers	24 September 1960
9685 Korteweg	24 September 1960
9686 Keesom	24 September 1960
9687 Uhlenbeck	24 September 1960
9688 Goudsmit	24 September 1960
9689 Freudenthal	24 September 1960
9690 Houtgast	24 September 1960
9691 Zwaan	24 September 1960
9692 Kuperus	24 September 1960
9693 Bleeker	24 September 1960
9694 Lycomedes	26 September 1960
9695 Johnheise	24 September 1960
9696 Jaffe	24 September 1960
9697 Louwman	25 March 1971

9698 Idzerda	25 March 1971
9699 Baumhauer	26 March 1971
9700 Paech	26 March 1971
9701 Mak	29 September 1973
9702 Tomvandijk	29 September 1973
9703 Sussenbach	30 September 1973
9704 Georgebeekman	30 September 1973
9705 Drummen	16 October 1977
9706 Bouma	16 October 1977
9707 Petruskoning	16 October 1977
9708 Gouka	16 October 1977
9709 Chrisnell	16 October 1977
9712 Nauplius	19 September 1973
9713 Oceax	19 September 1973
9815 Mariakirch	24 September 1960
9816 von Matt	24 September 1960
9817 Thersander	24 September 1960
9818 Eurymachos	24 September 1960
9819 Sangerhausen	25 March 1971
9820 Hempel	26 March 1971
9821 Gitakresáková	26 March 1971
9822 Hajduková	26 March 1971
9823 Annantalová	26 March 1971
9824 Marylea	30 September 1973
9825 Oetken	17 October 1977

9826 Ehrenfreund	16 October 1977
9828 Antimachos	19 September 1973
9829 Murillo	19 September 1973
9905 Tiziano	24 September 1960
9906 Tintoretto	26 September 1960
9907 Oileus	24 September 1960
9908 Aue	25 March 1971
9909 Eschenbach	26 March 1971
9910 Vogelweide	30 September 1973
9911 Quantz	29 September 1973
9912 Donizetti	16 October 1977
9913 Humperdinck	16 October 1977
9994 Grotius	24 September 1960
9995 Alouette	24 September 1960
9996 ANS	17 October 1960
9997 COBE	25 March 1971
9998 ISO	25 March 1971
9999 Wiles	29 September 1973
10242 Wasserkuppe	24 September 1960
10243 Hohe Meissner	22 October 1960
10244 Thüringer Wald	26 September 1960
10245 Inselsberg	24 September 1960
10246 Frankenwald	24 September 1960
10247 Amphiaraos	24 September 1960
10248 Fichtelgebirge	17 October 1960

10249 Harz	17 October 1960
10250 Hellahaasse	25 March 1971
10251 Mulisch	26 March 1971
10252 Heidigraf	26 March 1971
10253 Westerwald	29 September 1973
10254 Hunsrück	29 September 1973
10255 Taunus	16 October 1977
10256 Vredevoogd	16 October 1977
10257 Garecynthia	16 October 1977
10427 Klinkenberg	24 September 1960
10428 Wanders	24 September 1960
10429 van Woerden	24 September 1960
10430 Martschmidt	24 September 1960
10431 Pottasch	24 September 1960
10432 Ullischwarz	24 September 1960
10433 Ponsen	24 September 1960
10434 Tinbergen	24 September 1960
10435 Tjeerd	24 September 1960
10436 Janwillempel	24 September 1960
10437 van der Kruit	24 September 1960
10438 Ludolph	24 September 1960
10439 van Schooten	24 September 1960
10440 van Swinden	17 October 1960
10441 van Rijckevorsel	17 October 1960
10442 Biezenzo	26 March 1971

10443 van der Pol	29 September 1973
10444 de Hevesy	30 September 1973
10445 Coster	29 September 1973
10446 Siegbahn	16 October 1977
10447 Bloembergen	16 October 1977
10448 Schawlow	16 October 1977
10646 Machielalberts	26 September 1960
10648 Plancius	24 September 1960
10649 VOC	24 September 1960
10651 van Linschoten	24 September 1960
10652 Blaeu	24 September 1960
10653 Witsen	24 September 1960
10654 Bontekoe	24 September 1960
10655 Pietkeyser	17 October 1960
10656 Albrecht	25 March 1971
10657 Wanach	25 March 1971
10658 Gretadevries	25 March 1971
10659 Sauerland	26 March 1971
10660 Felixhormuth	26 March 1971
10661 Teutoburgerwald	29 September 1973
10662 Peterwisse	30 September 1973
10663 Schwarzwald	29 September 1973
10664 Phemios	25 September 1973
10665 Ortigão	16 October 1977
10666 Feldberg	16 October 1977

10947 Kaiserstuhl	24 September 1960
10948 Odenwald	24 September 1960
10949 Königstuhl	25 September 1960
10950 Albertjansen	24 September 1960
10951 Spessart	24 September 1960
10952 Vogelsberg	24 September 1960
10953 Gerdatschira	24 September 1960
10954 Spiegel	24 September 1960
10955 Harig	22 October 1960
10956 Vosges	24 September 1960
10957 Alps	24 September 1960
10958 Mont Blanc	24 September 1960
10959 Appennino	24 September 1960
10960 Gran Sasso	24 September 1960
10961 Buysballot	24 September 1960
10962 Sonnenborgh	17 October 1960
10963 van der Brugge	25 March 1971
10964 Degraaff	26 March 1971
10965 van Leverink	26 March 1971
10966 van der Hucht	26 March 1971
10967 Billallen	26 March 1971
10968 Sterken	26 March 1971
10969 Perryman	13 May 1971
10970 de Zeeuw	29 September 1973
10971 van Dishoeck	29 September 1973

10972 Merbold	29 September 1973
10973 Thomasreiter	29 September 1973
10974 Carolalbert	29 September 1973
10975 Schelderode	29 September 1973
10976 Wubbena	29 September 1973
10977 Mathlener	30 September 1973
10978 Bärbchen	29 September 1973
10979 Fristephenson	29 September 1973
10980 Breimer	29 September 1973
10981 Fransaris	17 October 1977
10982 Poerink	11 October 1977
10983 Smolders	16 October 1977
10984 Gispen	16 October 1977
10985 Feast	16 October 1977
10986 Govert	16 October 1977
10989 Dolios	19 September 1973
11238 Johanmaurits	24 September 1960
11239 Marcgraf	24 September 1960
11240 Piso	24 September 1960
11241 Eckhout	24 September 1960
11242 Franspost	25 March 1971
11243 de Graauw	25 March 1971
11244 Andrékuipers	29 September 1973
11245 Hansderijk	16 October 1977
11246 Orvillewright	16 October 1977

11247 Wilburwright	16 October 1977
11248 Blériot	16 October 1977
11249 Etna	24 March 1971
11251 Icarion	20 September 1973
11252 Laërtes	19 September 1973
11426 Molster	24 September 1960
11427 Willemkolff	24 September 1960
11428 Alcinoös	24 September 1960
11429 Demodokus	24 September 1960
11430 Lodewijkberg	17 October 1960
11431 Karelbosscha	13 May 1971
11432 Kerkhoven	29 September 1973
11433 Gemmafrisius	16 October 1977
11753 Geoffburbidge	24 September 1960
11754 Herbig	24 September 1960
11755 Paczynski	24 September 1960
11756 Geneparker	24 September 1960
11757 Salpeter	24 September 1960
11758 Sargent	24 September 1960
11759 Sunyaev	24 September 1960
11760 Auwers	24 September 1960
11761 Davidgill	24 September 1960
11762 Vogel	24 September 1960
11763 Deslandres	24 September 1960
11764 Benbaillaud	24 September 1960

11765 Alfredfowler	17 October 1960
11766 Fredseares	17 October 1960
11767 Milne	26 March 1971
11768 Merrill	26 March 1971
11769 Alfredjoy	29 September 1973
11770 Rudominkowski	30 September 1973
11771 Maestlin	29 September 1973
11772 Jacoblemaire	29 September 1973
11773 Schouten	17 October 1977
11774 Jerne	17 October 1977
11775 Köhler	16 October 1977
11776 Milstein	16 October 1977
11777 Hargrave	16 October 1977
11778 Kingsford Smith	16 October 1977
11779 Zernike	16 October 1977
12131 Echternach	24 September 1960
12132 Wimfröger	24 September 1960
12133 Titulaer	24 September 1960
12134 Hansfriedeman	24 September 1960
12135 Terlingen	24 September 1960
12136 Martinryle	24 September 1960
12137 Williefowler	24 September 1960
12138 Olinwilson	24 September 1960
12139 Tomcowling	24 September 1960
12140 Johnbolton	24 September 1960

12141 Chushayashi	24 September 1960
12142 Franklow	24 September 1960
12143 Harwit	24 September 1960
12144 Einhart	24 September 1960
12145 Behaim	24 September 1960
12146 Ostriker	24 September 1960
12147 Bramante	24 September 1960
12148 Caravaggio	24 September 1960
12149 Begas	17 October 1960
12150 De Ruyter	25 March 1971
12151 Oranje-Nassau	25 March 1971
12152 Aratus	25 March 1971
12153 Conon	26 March 1971
12154 Callimachus	26 March 1971
12155 Hyginus	26 March 1971
12156 Ubels	29 September 1973
12157 Können	29 September 1973
12158 Tape	29 September 1973
12159 Bettybiegel	29 September 1973
12160 Karelwakker	29 September 1973
12161 Avienius	29 September 1973
12162 Bilderdijk	29 September 1973
12163 Manilius	30 September 1973
12164 Lowellgreen	30 September 1973
12165 Ringleb	30 September 1973

12166 Oliverherrmann	25 September 1973
12167 Olivermüller	29 September 1973
12168 Polko	25 September 1973
12169 Munsterman	16 October 1977
12170 Vanvollenhoven	16 October 1977
12171 Johannink	16 October 1977
12172 Niekdekort	16 October 1977
12173 Lansbergen	16 October 1977
12174 van het Reve	16 October 1977
12175 Wimhermans	16 October 1977
12176 Hidayat	16 October 1977
12177 Raharto	16 October 1977
12178 Dhani	16 October 1977
12179 Taufiq	16 October 1977
12180 Kistemaker	16 October 1977
12606 Apuleius	24 September 1960
12607 Alcaeus	24 September 1960
12608 Aesop	24 September 1960
12609 Apollodoros	24 September 1960
12610 Hãfez	24 September 1960
12611 Ingres	24 September 1960
12612 Daumier	24 September 1960
12613 Hogarth	24 September 1960
12614 Hokusai	24 September 1960
12615 Mendesdeleon	24 September 1960

12616 Lochner	26 September 1960
12617 Angelusilesius	17 October 1960
12618 Cellarius	24 September 1960
12619 Anubelshunu	24 September 1960
12620 Simaqian	24 September 1960
12621 Alsufi	24 September 1960
12622 Doppelmayr	24 September 1960
12623 Tawaddud	17 October 1960
12624 Mariacunitia	17 October 1960
12625 Koopman	17 October 1960
12626 Timmerman	25 March 1971
12627 Maryedwards	25 March 1971
12628 Acworthorr	25 March 1971
12629 Jandeboer	25 March 1971
12630 Verstappen	26 March 1971
12631 Mariekebaan	26 March 1971
12632 Mignonette	26 March 1971
12633 Warmenhoven	26 March 1971
12634 LOFAR	26 March 1971
12635 Hennylamers	26 March 1971
12636 Padrielli	13 May 1971
12637 Gustavleonhardt	29 September 1973
12638 Fransbrüggen	29 September 1973
12639 Tonkoopman	29 September 1973
12640 Reinbertdeleeuw	29 September 1973

12641 Hubertushenrichs	29 September 1973
12642 Davidjansen	29 September 1973
12643 Henkolthof	30 September 1973
12644 Robertwielinga	30 September 1973
12645 Jacobrosales	29 September 1973
12646 Avercamp	25 September 1973
12647 Pauluspotter	30 September 1973
12648 Ibarbourou	17 October 1977
12649 Ascanios	16 October 1977
12650 de Vries	16 October 1977
12651 Frenkel	16 October 1977
12652 Groningen	16 October 1977
12653 van der Klis	11 October 1977
12654 Heinofalcke	16 October 1977
12655 Benferinga	16 October 1977
12656 Gerdebruijn	16 October 1977
12658 Peiraios	19 September 1973
(12936) 2549 P-L	24 September 1960
12937 Premadi	24 September 1960
(12938) 4161 P-L	24 September 1960
(12939) 4206 P-L	24 September 1960
(12940) 4588 P-L	24 September 1960
(12941) 4638 P-L	24 September 1960
(12942) 6054 P-L	24 September 1960
(12943) 6670 P-L	24 September 1960

(12944) 6745 P-L	24 September 1960
(12945) 9534 P-L	17 October 1960
(12946) 1290 T-1	25 March 1971
(12947) 3099 T-1	26 March 1971
(12948) 4273 T-1	26 March 1971
(12949) 4290 T-1	26 March 1971
(12950) 4321 T-1	26 March 1971
(12951) 1041 T-2	29 September 1973
(12952) 1102 T-2	29 September 1973
(12953) 1264 T-2	29 September 1973
(12954) 2040 T-2	29 September 1973
(12955) 2162 T-2	29 September 1973
(12956) 2232 T-2	29 September 1973
(12957) 2258 T-2	29 September 1973
(12958) 2276 T-2	29 September 1973
(12959) 3086 T-2	30 September 1973
(12960) 4165 T-2	29 September 1973
(12961) 4262 T-2	29 September 1973
(12962) 4297 T-2	29 September 1973
(12963) 5485 T-2	30 September 1973
(12964) 1071 T-3	17 October 1977
(12965) 1080 T-3	17 October 1977
(12966) 1102 T-3	17 October 1977
(12967) 3105 T-3	16 October 1977
(12968) 3261 T-3	16 October 1977

(12969) 3482 T-3	16 October 1977
(12970) 4012 T-3	16 October 1977
(12971) 4054 T-3	16 October 1977
12972 Eumaios	19 September 1973
12973 Melanthios	19 September 1973
12974 Halitherses	19 September 1973
13439 Frankiethomas	24 September 1960
(13440) 2095 P-L	24 September 1960
13441 Janmerlin	24 September 1960
(13442) 2646 P-L	24 September 1960
(13443) 2785 P-L	26 September 1960
(13444) 3040 P-L	24 September 1960
(13445) 3063 P-L	24 September 1960
13446 Almarkim	24 September 1960
(13447) 4115 P-L	24 September 1960
13448 Edbryce	24 September 1960
13449 Margaretgarland	24 September 1960
(13450) 6077 P-L	24 September 1960
(13451) 6103 P-L	24 September 1960
(13452) 6513 P-L	24 September 1960
(13453) 6538 P-L	24 September 1960
(13454) 6594 P-L	24 September 1960
(13455) 6626 P-L	24 September 1960
(13456) 6640 P-L	26 September 1960
(13457) 6761 P-L	24 September 1960

(13458) 4214 T-1	26 March 1971
(13459) 4235 T-1	26 March 1971
(13460) 1083 T-2	29 September 1973
(13461) 1607 T-2	24 September 1973
(13462) 2076 T-2	29 September 1973
13463 Antiphos	25 September 1973
(13464) 1036 T-3	17 October 1977
(13465) 1194 T-3	17 October 1977
(13466) 2349 T-3	16 October 1977
(13467) 2676 T-3	11 October 1977
(13468) 3378 T-3	16 October 1977
(13469) 3424 T-3	16 October 1977
(13470) 3517 T-3	16 October 1977
(13471) 4046 T-3	16 October 1977
(13472) 4064 T-3	16 October 1977
13475 Orestes	19 September 1973
(13870) 2158 P-L	24 September 1960
(13871) 2635 P-L	24 September 1960
(13872) 2649 P-L	24 September 1960
(13873) 2657 P-L	24 September 1960
(13874) 3013 P-L	24 September 1960
(13875) 4525 P-L	24 September 1960
(13876) 4625 P-L	24 September 1960
(13877) 6063 P-L	24 September 1960
(13878) 6106 P-L	24 September 1960

(13879) 6328 P-L	24 September 1960
13880 Wayneclark	24 September 1960
(13881) 6625 P-L	24 September 1960
(13882) 6637 P-L	24 September 1960
(13883) 7066 P-L	17 October 1960
(13884) 1064 T-1	25 March 1971
(13885) 2104 T-1	25 March 1971
(13886) 2312 T-1	25 March 1971
(13887) 3041 T-1	26 March 1971
(13888) 3290 T-1	26 March 1971
(13889) 4206 T-1	26 March 1971
(13890) 1186 T-2	29 September 1973
(13891) 1237 T-2	29 September 1973
(13892) 1266 T-2	29 September 1973
(13893) 1296 T-2	29 September 1973
(13894) 2039 T-2	29 September 1973
13895 Letkasagjonica	29 September 1973
(13896) 3310 T-2	30 September 1973
13897 Vesuvius	29 September 1973
(13898) 4834 T-2	25 September 1973
(13899) 5036 T-2	25 September 1973
(13900) 5211 T-2	25 September 1973
(13901) 1140 T-3	17 October 1977
(13902) 4205 T-3	16 October 1977
14282 Cruijff	24 September 1960

(14283) 2206 P-L	24 September 1960
(14284) 2530 P-L	24 September 1960
(14285) 2566 P-L	24 September 1960
(14286) 2577 P-L	24 September 1960
(14287) 2777 P-L	24 September 1960
(14288) 2796 P-L	26 September 1960
(14289) 4648 P-L	24 September 1960
(14290) 9072 P-L	17 October 1960
(14291) 1104 T-1	25 March 1971
(14292) 1148 T-1	25 March 1971
(14293) 2307 T-1	25 March 1971
(14294) 3306 T-1	26 March 1971
(14295) 4161 T-1	26 March 1971
(14296) 4298 T-1	26 March 1971
(14297) 2124 T-2	29 September 1973
(14298) 2144 T-2	29 September 1973
(14299) 3162 T-2	30 September 1973
(14300) 3336 T-2	25 September 1973
(14301) 5205 T-2	25 September 1973
(14302) 5482 T-2	30 September 1973
(14303) 1144 T-3	17 October 1977
(14304) 3417 T-3	16 October 1977
(14305) 3437 T-3	16 October 1977
(14306) 4327 T-3	16 October 1977
(14307) 4336 T-3	16 October 1977

14308 Hardeman	16 October 1977
(14743) 2016 P-L	24 September 1960
(14744) 2092 P-L	26 September 1960
(14745) 2154 P-L	24 September 1960
(14746) 2164 P-L	26 September 1960
(14747) 2541 P-L	24 September 1960
(14748) 2620 P-L	24 September 1960
(14749) 2626 P-L	26 September 1960
(14750) 2654 P-L	24 September 1960
(14751) 2688 P-L	24 September 1960
(14752) 3005 P-L	24 September 1960
(14753) 4592 P-L	24 September 1960
(14754) 4806 P-L	24 September 1960
(14755) 6069 P-L	24 September 1960
(14756) 6232 P-L	24 September 1960
(14757) 6309 P-L	24 September 1960
(14758) 6519 P-L	24 September 1960
(14759) 6520 P-L	24 September 1960
(14760) 6595 P-L	24 September 1960
(14761) 6608 P-L	24 September 1960
(14762) 6647 P-L	26 September 1960
(14763) 6793 P-L	24 September 1960
14764 Kilauea	17 October 1960
(14765) 9519 P-L	17 October 1960
(14766) 9594 P-L	17 October 1960

(14767) 1137 T-1	25 March 1971
(14768) 1238 T-1	25 March 1971
(14769) 2175 T-1	25 March 1971
(14770) 2198 T-1	25 March 1971
(14771) 4105 T-1	26 March 1971
(14772) 4195 T-1	26 March 1971
(14773) 4264 T-1	26 March 1971
(14774) 4845 T-1	13 May 1971
(14775) 1139 T-2	29 September 1973
(14776) 1282 T-2	29 September 1973
(14777) 2078 T-2	29 September 1973
(14778) 2216 T-2	29 September 1973
(14779) 3072 T-2	30 September 1973
(14780) 1078 T-3	17 October 1977
(14781) 1107 T-3	17 October 1977
(14782) 3149 T-3	16 October 1977
(14783) 3152 T-3	16 October 1977
(14784) 3268 T-3	16 October 1977
(14785) 3508 T-3	16 October 1977
(14786) 4052 T-3	16 October 1977
(14787) 5038 T-3	16 October 1977
(14788) 5172 T-3	16 October 1977
14791 Atreus	19 September 1973
14792 Thyestes	24 September 1973
15168 Marijnfranx	24 September 1960

15169 Wilfriedboland	24 September 1960
15170 Erikdeul	24 September 1960
15171 Xandertielens	24 September 1960
(15172) 3086 P-L	24 September 1960
(15173) 3520 P-L	17 October 1960
(15174) 4649 P-L	24 September 1960
(15175) 6113 P-L	24 September 1960
(15176) 6299 P-L	24 September 1960
(15177) 6599 P-L	24 September 1960
(15178) 7075 P-L	17 October 1960
(15179) 9062 P-L	17 October 1960
(15180) 9094 P-L	17 October 1960
(15181) 9525 P-L	17 October 1960
(15182) 9538 P-L	17 October 1960
(15183) 3074 T-1	26 March 1971
(15184) 3232 T-1	26 March 1971
(15185) 4104 T-1	26 March 1971
(15186) 2058 T-2	29 September 1973
(15187) 2112 T-2	29 September 1973
(15188) 3044 T-2	30 September 1973
(15189) 3071 T-2	30 September 1973
(15190) 3353 T-2	25 September 1973
(15191) 4234 T-2	29 September 1973
(15192) 5049 T-2	25 September 1973
(15193) 5148 T-2	25 September 1973

(15194) 2272 T-3	16 October 1977
(15195) 2407 T-3	16 October 1977
(15196) 3178 T-3	16 October 1977
(15197) 4203 T-3	16 October 1977
(15639) 2074 P-L	24 September 1960
(15640) 2632 P-L	24 September 1960
(15641) 2668 P-L	24 September 1960
(15642) 2679 P-L	24 September 1960
(15643) 3540 P-L	17 October 1960
(15644) 4157 P-L	24 September 1960
(15645) 4163 P-L	24 September 1960
(15646) 4555 P-L	24 September 1960
(15647) 4556 P-L	24 September 1960
(15648) 6115 P-L	24 September 1960
(15649) 6317 P-L	24 September 1960
(15650) 6725 P-L	24 September 1960
15651 Tlepolemos	22 October 1960
(15652) 1048 T-1	25 March 1971
(15653) 1080 T-1	25 March 1971
(15654) 1176 T-1	25 March 1971
(15655) 2209 T-1	25 March 1971
(15656) 3277 T-1	26 March 1971
(15657) 1125 T-2	29 September 1973
(15658) 1265 T-2	29 September 1973
(15659) 2141 T-2	29 September 1973

(15660) 3025 T-2	30 September 1973
(15661) 3281 T-2	30 September 1973
(15662) 4064 T-2	29 September 1973
15663 Periphas	29 September 1973
(15664) 4050 T-3	16 October 1977
(15665) 4094 T-3	16 October 1977
(15666) 5021 T-3	16 October 1977
(15667) 5046 T-3	16 October 1977
(15668) 5138 T-3	16 October 1977
(16281) 2071 P-L	24 September 1960
(16282) 2512 P-L	24 September 1960
(16283) 2545 P-L	24 September 1960
(16284) 2861 P-L	24 September 1960
(16285) 3047 P-L	24 September 1960
(16286) 4057 P-L	24 September 1960
(16287) 4096 P-L	24 September 1960
(16288) 4169 P-L	24 September 1960
(16289) 4201 P-L	24 September 1960
(16290) 4204 P-L	24 September 1960
(16291) 4315 P-L	24 September 1960
(16292) 4557 P-L	24 September 1960
(16293) 4613 P-L	24 September 1960
(16294) 4758 P-L	24 September 1960
(16295) 4820 P-L	24 September 1960
(16296) 6308 P-L	24 September 1960

(16297) 6346 P-L	24 September 1960
(16298) 6529 P-L	24 September 1960
(16299) 6566 P-L	24 September 1960
(16300) 6569 P-L	24 September 1960
(16301) 6576 P-L	24 September 1960
(16302) 6634 P-L	24 September 1960
(16303) 6639 P-L	24 September 1960
(16304) 6704 P-L	24 September 1960
(16305) 6707 P-L	24 September 1960
(16306) 6797 P-L	24 September 1960
(16307) 7569 P-L	17 October 1960
(16308) 7627 P-L	22 October 1960
(16309) 9054 P-L	17 October 1960
(16310) 1043 T-1	25 March 1971
(16311) 1102 T-1	25 March 1971
(16312) 1122 T-1	25 March 1971
(16313) 1199 T-1	25 March 1971
(16314) 1248 T-1	25 March 1971
(16315) 2055 T-1	25 March 1971
(16316) 2089 T-1	25 March 1971
(16317) 2127 T-1	25 March 1971
(16318) 2128 T-1	25 March 1971
16319 Xiamenerzhong	26 March 1971
(16320) 4078 T-1	26 March 1971
(16321) 4225 T-1	26 March 1971

(16322) 4409 T-1	26 March 1971
(16323) 1107 T-2	29 September 1973
(16324) 1181 T-2	29 September 1973
(16325) 1332 T-2	29 September 1973
(16326) 2052 T-2	29 September 1973
(16327) 3092 T-2	30 September 1973
(16328) 3111 T-2	30 September 1973
(16329) 3255 T-2	30 September 1973
(16330) 3276 T-2	30 September 1973
(16331) 4101 T-2	29 September 1973
(16332) 4117 T-2	29 September 1973
(16333) 4122 T-2	29 September 1973
(16334) 4278 T-2	29 September 1973
(16335) 5058 T-2	25 September 1973
(16336) 5080 T-2	25 September 1973
(16337) 5087 T-2	25 September 1973
(16338) 1106 T-3	17 October 1977
(16339) 2053 T-3	16 October 1977
(16340) 2110 T-3	16 October 1977
(16341) 2182 T-3	16 October 1977
(16342) 2271 T-3	16 October 1977
(16343) 2326 T-3	16 October 1977
(16344) 2370 T-3	16 October 1977
(16345) 2391 T-3	16 October 1977
(16346) 2682 T-3	11 October 1977

(16347) 3256 T-3	16 October 1977
(16348) 3465 T-3	16 October 1977
(16349) 4062 T-3	16 October 1977
(17289) 2037 P-L	24 September 1960
(17290) 2060 P-L	24 September 1960
(17291) 2547 P-L	24 September 1960
(17292) 2656 P-L	24 September 1960
(17293) 2743 P-L	24 September 1960
(17294) 2787 P-L	26 September 1960
(17295) 2827 P-L	24 September 1960
(17296) 3541 P-L	17 October 1960
(17297) 3560 P-L	22 October 1960
(17298) 4031 P-L	24 September 1960
(17299) 4168 P-L	24 September 1960
(17300) 4321 P-L	24 September 1960
(17301) 4609 P-L	24 September 1960
(17302) 4610 P-L	24 September 1960
(17303) 4629 P-L	24 September 1960
(17304) 4637 P-L	24 September 1960
17305 Caniff	24 September 1960
(17306) 4865 P-L	24 September 1960
(17307) 4895 P-L	24 September 1960
(17308) 6079 P-L	24 September 1960
(17309) 6528 P-L	24 September 1960
(17310) 6574 P-L	24 September 1960

(17311) 6584 P-L	24 September 1960
(17312) 7622 P-L	22 October 1960
(17313) 9542 P-L	17 October 1960
17314 Aisakos	25 March 1971
(17315) 1089 T-1	25 March 1971
(17316) 1198 T-1	25 March 1971
(17317) 1208 T-1	25 March 1971
(17318) 2091 T-1	25 March 1971
(17319) 3078 T-1	26 March 1971
(17320) 3182 T-1	26 March 1971
(17321) 3188 T-1	26 March 1971
(17322) 3274 T-1	26 March 1971
(17323) 3284 T-1	26 March 1971
(17324) 3292 T-1	26 March 1971
(17325) 3300 T-1	26 March 1971
(17326) 4023 T-1	26 March 1971
(17327) 4155 T-1	26 March 1971
(17328) 1176 T-2	29 September 1973
(17329) 1277 T-2	29 September 1973
(17330) 1358 T-2	29 September 1973
(17331) 2056 T-2	29 September 1973
(17332) 2120 T-2	29 September 1973
(17333) 2174 T-2	29 September 1973
(17334) 2275 T-2	29 September 1973
(17335) 2281 T-2	29 September 1973

(17336) 3193 T-2	30 September 1973
(17337) 3198 T-2	30 September 1973
(17338) 3212 T-2	30 September 1973
(17339) 4060 T-2	29 September 1973
(17340) 4096 T-2	29 September 1973
(17341) 4120 T-2	29 September 1973
(17342) 5185 T-2	25 September 1973
(17343) 1111 T-3	17 October 1977
(17344) 1120 T-3	17 October 1977
(17345) 2216 T-3	16 October 1977
(17346) 2395 T-3	16 October 1977
(17347) 3449 T-3	16 October 1977
(17348) 4166 T-3	16 October 1977
(17349) 4353 T-3	16 October 1977
17351 Pheidippos	19 September 1973
(18197) 2055 P-L	24 September 1960
(18198) 2056 P-L	24 September 1960
(18199) 2583 P-L	24 September 1960
(18200) 2714 P-L	24 September 1960
(18201) 2733 P-L	24 September 1960
(18202) 2757 P-L	24 September 1960
(18203) 2837 P-L	24 September 1960
(18204) 3065 P-L	24 September 1960
(18205) 3090 P-L	24 September 1960
(18206) 3093 P-L	24 September 1960

(18207) 4041 P-L	24 September 1960
(18208) 4095 P-L	24 September 1960
(18209) 4158 P-L	24 September 1960
(18210) 4529 P-L	24 September 1960
(18211) 4597 P-L	24 September 1960
(18212) 4603 P-L	24 September 1960
(18213) 4607 P-L	24 September 1960
(18214) 4615 P-L	24 September 1960
(18215) 4792 P-L	24 September 1960
(18216) 4917 P-L	24 September 1960
(18217) 5021 P-L	17 October 1960
(18218) 6245 P-L	24 September 1960
(18219) 6260 P-L	24 September 1960
(18220) 6286 P-L	24 September 1960
(18221) 6526 P-L	24 September 1960
(18222) 6669 P-L	24 September 1960
(18223) 6700 P-L	24 September 1960
(18224) 6726 P-L	24 September 1960
(18225) 7069 P-L	22 October 1960
(18226) 1182 T-1	25 March 1971
(18227) 1222 T-1	25 March 1971
18228 Hyperenor	26 March 1971
(18229) 3222 T-1	26 March 1971
(18230) 3285 T-1	26 March 1971
(18231) 3286 T-1	26 March 1971

(18232) 3322 T-1	26 March 1971
(18233) 4068 T-1	26 March 1971
(18234) 4262 T-1	26 March 1971
18235 Lynden-Bell	29 September 1973
18236 Bernardburke	29 September 1973
18237 Kenfreeman	29 September 1973
18238 Frankshu	29 September 1973
18239 Ekers	29 September 1973
18240 Mould	29 September 1973
18241 Genzel	29 September 1973
18242 Peebles	29 September 1973
18243 Gunn	29 September 1973
18244 Anneila	30 September 1973
(18245) 3061 T-2	30 September 1973
(18246) 3088 T-2	30 September 1973
(18247) 3151 T-2	30 September 1973
(18248) 3152 T-2	30 September 1973
(18249) 3175 T-2	30 September 1973
(18250) 3178 T-2	30 September 1973
(18251) 3207 T-2	30 September 1973
(18252) 3282 T-2	30 September 1973
(18253) 3295 T-2	30 September 1973
(18254) 4062 T-2	29 September 1973
(18255) 4188 T-2	29 September 1973
(18256) 4195 T-2	29 September 1973

(18257) 4209 T-2	29 September 1973
(18258) 4250 T-2	29 September 1973
(18259) 4311 T-2	29 September 1973
(18260) 5056 T-2	25 September 1973
(18261) 5065 T-2	25 September 1973
(18262) 5125 T-2	25 September 1973
18263 Anchialos	25 September 1973
(18264) 5184 T-2	25 September 1973
(18265) 1136 T-3	16 October 1977
(18266) 1189 T-3	17 October 1977
(18267) 2122 T-3	16 October 1977
18268 Dardanos	16 October 1977
(18269) 2206 T-3	16 October 1977
(18270) 2312 T-3	16 October 1977
(18271) 2332 T-3	16 October 1977
(18272) 2495 T-3	16 October 1977
(18273) 3140 T-3	16 October 1977
(18274) 3150 T-3	16 October 1977
(18275) 3173 T-3	16 October 1977
(18276) 3355 T-3	16 October 1977
(18277) 3446 T-3	16 October 1977
18278 Drymas	16 October 1977
(18279) 4221 T-3	16 October 1977
(18280) 4245 T-3	16 October 1977
18281 Tros	16 October 1977

18282 Ilos	16 October 1977
(18283) 5165 T-3	16 October 1977
(19032) 2053 P-L	24 September 1960
(19033) 2157 P-L	24 September 1960
19034 Santorini	24 September 1960
(19035) 4634 P-L	24 September 1960
(19036) 4642 P-L	24 September 1960
(19037) 4663 P-L	24 September 1960
(19038) 4764 P-L	24 September 1960
(19039) 4844 P-L	24 September 1960
(19040) 4875 P-L	26 September 1960
(19041) 6055 P-L	24 September 1960
(19042) 6104 P-L	24 September 1960
(19043) 6214 P-L	24 September 1960
(19044) 6516 P-L	24 September 1960
(19045) 6593 P-L	24 September 1960
(19046) 7607 P-L	17 October 1960
(19047) 9516 P-L	22 October 1960
(19048) 9567 P-L	17 October 1960
(19049) 1105 T-1	25 March 1971
(19050) 1162 T-1	25 March 1971
(19051) 3210 T-1	26 March 1971
(19052) 1017 T-2	29 September 1973
(19053) 1054 T-2	29 September 1973
(19054) 1058 T-2	29 September 1973

(19055) 1066 T-2	29 September 1973
(19056) 1162 T-2	29 September 1973
(19057) 1166 T-2	29 September 1973
(19058) 1331 T-2	29 September 1973
(19059) 1352 T-2	29 September 1973
(19060) 2176 T-2	29 September 1973
(19061) 2261 T-2	29 September 1973
(19062) 2289 T-2	29 September 1973
(19063) 3147 T-2	30 September 1973
(19064) 3176 T-2	30 September 1973
(19065) 3351 T-2	25 September 1973
19066 Ellarie	29 September 1973
(19067) 4087 T-2	29 September 1973
(19068) 4232 T-2	29 September 1973
(19069) 5149 T-2	25 September 1973
(19070) 5491 T-2	30 September 1973
(19071) 1047 T-3	17 October 1977
(19072) 1222 T-3	17 October 1977
(19073) 3157 T-3	16 October 1977
(19074) 4236 T-3	16 October 1977
(19075) 4288 T-3	16 October 1977
(19076) 5002 T-3	16 October 1977
(19077) 5123 T-3	16 October 1977
(19078) 5187 T-3	16 October 1977
(19862) 2556 P-L	24 September 1960

(19863) 2725 P-L	24 September 1960
(19864) 2775 P-L	24 September 1960
(19865) 2825 P-L	24 September 1960
(19866) 4014 P-L	24 September 1960
(19867) 4061 P-L	24 September 1960
(19868) 4072 P-L	24 September 1960
(19869) 4202 P-L	24 September 1960
(19870) 4780 P-L	24 September 1960
(19871) 6058 P-L	24 September 1960
19872 Chendonghua	24 September 1960
19873 Chentao	24 September 1960
19874 Liudongyan	24 September 1960
19875 Guedes	24 September 1960
(19876) 7637 P-L	22 October 1960
(19877) 9086 P-L	17 October 1960
(19878) 1030 T-1	25 March 1971
(19879) 1274 T-1	25 March 1971
(19880) 2247 T-1	25 March 1971
(19881) 2288 T-1	25 March 1971
(19882) 3024 T-1	26 March 1971
(19883) 4058 T-1	26 March 1971
(19884) 4125 T-1	26 March 1971
(19885) 4283 T-1	26 March 1971
(19886) 1167 T-2	29 September 1973
(19887) 1279 T-2	29 September 1973

(19888) 2048 T-2	29 September 1973
(19889) 2304 T-2	29 September 1973
(19890) 3042 T-2	30 September 1973
(19891) 3326 T-2	25 September 1973
(19892) 4128 T-2	29 September 1973
(19893) 4524 T-2	30 September 1973
(19894) 5124 T-2	25 September 1973
(19895) 5161 T-2	25 September 1973
(19896) 5366 T-2	30 September 1973
(19897) 1097 T-3	17 October 1977
(19898) 1177 T-3	17 October 1977
(19899) 1188 T-3	17 October 1977
(19900) 2172 T-3	16 October 1977
(19901) 2191 T-3	16 October 1977
(19902) 3420 T-3	16 October 1977
(19903) 3464 T-3	16 October 1977
(19904) 3487 T-3	16 October 1977
(19905) 4086 T-3	16 October 1977
(19906) 4138 T-3	16 October 1977
(19907) 4220 T-3	16 October 1977
(19908) 4324 T-3	16 October 1977
(19909) 4326 T-3	16 October 1977
(19910) 5078 T-3	16 October 1977
19913 Aigyptios	19 September 1973
(20904) 2190 P-L	24 September 1960

(20905) 2581 P-L	24 September 1960
(20906) 2727 P-L	24 September 1960
(20907) 2762 P-L	24 September 1960
(20908) 2819 P-L	24 September 1960
(20909) 4026 P-L	24 September 1960
(20910) 4060 P-L	24 September 1960
(20911) 4083 P-L	24 September 1960
(20912) 4129 P-L	24 September 1960
(20913) 4214 P-L	24 September 1960
(20914) 4215 P-L	24 September 1960
(20915) 4302 P-L	24 September 1960
(20916) 4628 P-L	24 September 1960
(20917) 5016 P-L	22 October 1960
(20918) 6539 P-L	24 September 1960
(20919) 6606 P-L	24 September 1960
(20920) 6653 P-L	24 September 1960
(20921) 6680 P-L	24 September 1960
(20922) 6769 P-L	24 September 1960
(20923) 6846 P-L	24 September 1960
(20924) 9526 P-L	17 October 1960
(20925) 9596 P-L	22 October 1960
(20926) 1101 T-1	25 March 1971
(20927) 1126 T-1	25 March 1971
(20928) 2024 T-1	25 March 1971
(20929) 2050 T-1	25 March 1971

(20930) 2130 T-1	25 March 1971
(20931) 2208 T-1	25 March 1971
(20932) 2258 T-1	25 March 1971
(20933) 3015 T-1	26 March 1971
(20934) 4194 T-1	26 March 1971
(20935) 4265 T-1	26 March 1971
20936 Nemrut Dagi	13 May 1971
(20937) 1005 T-2	29 September 1973
(20938) 1075 T-2	29 September 1973
(20939) 1178 T-2	29 September 1973
(20940) 1236 T-2	29 September 1973
(20941) 1341 T-2	29 September 1973
(20942) 2092 T-2	29 September 1973
(20943) 2115 T-2	29 September 1973
(20944) 2200 T-2	29 September 1973
(20945) 2248 T-2	29 September 1973
(20946) 2316 T-2	29 September 1973
20947 Polyneikes	29 September 1973
(20948) 2754 T-2	30 September 1973
(20949) 3024 T-2	30 September 1973
(20950) 3305 T-2	30 September 1973
(20951) 4261 T-2	29 September 1973
20952 Tydeus	25 September 1973
(20953) 1068 T-3	17 October 1977
(20954) 1158 T-3	17 October 1977

(20955) 2387 T-3	16 October 1977
(20956) 3510 T-3	16 October 1977
(20957) 4430 T-3	11 October 1977
20961 Arkesilaos	19 September 1973
22189 Gijskatgert	24 September 1960
22190 Stellakwee	24 September 1960
22191 Achúcarro	24 September 1960
22192 Vivienreuter	24 September 1960
(22193) 2712 P-L	24 September 1960
(22194) 2740 P-L	24 September 1960
22195 Nevadodelruiz	17 October 1960
(22196) 3518 P-L	17 October 1960
(22197) 3555 P-L	22 October 1960
(22198) 4080 P-L	24 September 1960
22199 Klonios	24 September 1960
(22200) 4573 P-L	26 September 1960
(22201) 4584 P-L	24 September 1960
(22202) 4715 P-L	24 September 1960
22203 Prothoenor	24 September 1960
(22204) 6121 P-L	24 September 1960
(22205) 6703 P-L	24 September 1960
(22206) 6735 P-L	24 September 1960
(22207) 7081 P-L	17 October 1960
(22208) 7605 P-L	17 October 1960
(22209) 1056 T-1	25 March 1971

(22210) 2206 T-1	25 March 1971
(22211) 3106 T-1	26 March 1971
(22212) 3195 T-1	26 March 1971
(22213) 4322 T-1	26 March 1971
(22214) 4326 T-1	26 March 1971
(22215) 1108 T-2	29 September 1973
(22216) 1242 T-2	29 September 1973
(22217) 1260 T-2	29 September 1973
(22218) 2064 T-2	29 September 1973
(22219) 2066 T-2	29 September 1973
(22220) 2097 T-2	29 September 1973
(22221) 2243 T-2	29 September 1973
22222 Hodios	30 September 1973
(22223) 3232 T-2	30 September 1973
(22224) 3270 T-2	30 September 1973
(22225) 4091 T-2	29 September 1973
(22226) 4328 T-2	29 September 1973
22227 Polyxenos	25 September 1973
(22228) 5081 T-2	25 September 1973
(22229) 5415 T-2	25 September 1973
(22230) 1022 T-3	17 October 1977
(22231) 2239 T-3	16 October 1977
(22232) 2311 T-3	16 October 1977
(22233) 3093 T-3	16 October 1977
(22234) 3166 T-3	16 October 1977

(22235) 3502 T-3	16 October 1977
(22236) 3535 T-3	16 October 1977
(22237) 3833 T-3	16 October 1977
(22238) 3854 T-3	16 October 1977
(22239) 4030 T-3	16 October 1977
(22240) 4039 T-3	16 October 1977
(22241) 4072 T-3	16 October 1977
(22242) 4080 T-3	16 October 1977
(22243) 4141 T-3	16 October 1977
(22244) 4235 T-3	16 October 1977
(22245) 4309 T-3	16 October 1977
(22246) 4380 T-3	16 October 1977
(22247) 4611 T-3	16 October 1977
(22248) 5029 T-3	16 October 1977
(23333) 2059 P-L	24 September 1960
(23334) 2508 P-L	24 September 1960
(23335) 2542 P-L	24 September 1960
(23336) 2579 P-L	24 September 1960
(23337) 2613 P-L	24 September 1960
(23338) 2809 P-L	24 September 1960
(23339) 3025 P-L	24 September 1960
(23340) 3092 P-L	24 September 1960
(23341) 3503 P-L	17 October 1960
(23342) 4086 P-L	24 September 1960
(23343) 4238 P-L	24 September 1960

(23344) 4612 P-L	24 September 1960
(23345) 4619 P-L	24 September 1960
(23346) 4695 P-L	24 September 1960
(23347) 5567 P-L	17 October 1960
(23348) 6046 P-L	24 September 1960
(23349) 6741 P-L	24 September 1960
(23350) 6779 P-L	24 September 1960
(23351) 6818 P-L	24 September 1960
(23352) 7585 P-L	17 October 1960
(23353) 9518 P-L	17 October 1960
(23354) 9547 P-L	17 October 1960
23355 Elephenor	17 October 1960
(23356) 1194 T-1	25 March 1971
(23357) 1285 T-1	25 March 1971
(23358) 2194 T-1	25 March 1971
(23359) 2301 T-1	25 March 1971
(23360) 3101 T-1	26 March 1971
(23361) 3243 T-1	26 March 1971
(23362) 3248 T-1	26 March 1971
(23363) 3770 T-1	13 May 1971
(23364) 4060 T-1	26 March 1971
(23365) 4217 T-1	26 March 1971
(23366) 1043 T-2	29 September 1973
(23367) 1173 T-2	29 September 1973
(23368) 1196 T-2	29 September 1973

(23369) 1295 T-2	29 September 1973
(23370) 1329 T-2	29 September 1973
(23371) 1364 T-2	29 September 1973
(23372) 1405 T-2	29 September 1973
(23373) 2133 T-2	29 September 1973
(23374) 2207 T-2	29 September 1973
(23375) 2234 T-2	29 September 1973
(23376) 2239 T-2	29 September 1973
(23377) 3035 T-2	30 September 1973
(23378) 3043 T-2	30 September 1973
(23379) 3159 T-2	30 September 1973
(23380) 3197 T-2	30 September 1973
(23381) 3363 T-2	25 September 1973
23382 Epistrophos	30 September 1973
23383 Schedios	25 September 1973
(23384) 5163 T-2	25 September 1973
(23385) 5168 T-2	25 September 1973
(23386) 5179 T-2	25 September 1973
(23387) 1039 T-3	17 October 1977
(23388) 1168 T-3	17 October 1977
(23389) 1181 T-3	17 October 1977
(23390) 1186 T-3	17 October 1977
(23391) 2065 T-3	16 October 1977
(23392) 2416 T-3	16 October 1977
(23393) 3283 T-3	16 October 1977

(23394) 4340 T-3	16 October 1977
(23395) 5018 T-3	16 October 1977
(23396) 5112 T-3	16 October 1977
(23397) 5122 T-3	16 October 1977
(23398) 5124 T-3	16 October 1977
(23399) 5132 T-3	16 October 1977
23405 Nisyros	19 September 1973
(24551) 2048 P-L	24 September 1960
(24552) 2226 P-L	24 September 1960
(24553) 2590 P-L	24 September 1960
(24554) 2608 P-L	24 September 1960
(24555) 2839 P-L	24 September 1960
(24556) 3514 P-L	17 October 1960
(24557) 3521 P-L	17 October 1960
(24558) 4037 P-L	24 September 1960
(24559) 4148 P-L	24 September 1960
(24560) 4517 P-L	24 September 1960
(24561) 4646 P-L	24 September 1960
(24562) 4647 P-L	24 September 1960
(24563) 4858 P-L	24 September 1960
(24564) 6056 P-L	24 September 1960
(24565) 6577 P-L	24 September 1960
(24566) 6777 P-L	24 September 1960
(24567) 6790 P-L	24 September 1960
(24568) 6794 P-L	24 September 1960

(24569) 9609 P-L	24 September 1960
(24570) 2153 T-1	25 March 1971
(24571) 2179 T-1	25 March 1971
(24572) 2221 T-1	25 March 1971
(24573) 2237 T-1	25 March 1971
(24574) 3312 T-1	26 March 1971
(24575) 3314 T-1	26 March 1971
(24576) 4406 T-1	26 March 1971
(24577) 4841 T-1	13 May 1971
(24578) 1036 T-2	29 September 1973
(24579) 1320 T-2	29 September 1973
(24580) 1414 T-2	30 September 1973
(24581) 1474 T-2	30 September 1973
(24582) 2085 T-2	29 September 1973
(24583) 2197 T-2	29 September 1973
(24584) 3256 T-2	30 September 1973
(24585) 4201 T-2	29 September 1973
(24586) 4230 T-2	29 September 1973
24587 Kapaneus	30 September 1973
(24588) 4733 T-2	30 September 1973
(24589) 5128 T-2	25 September 1973
(24590) 1156 T-3	17 October 1977
(24591) 2139 T-3	16 October 1977
(24592) 3039 T-3	16 October 1977
(24593) 3041 T-3	16 October 1977

(24594) 3138 T-3	16 October 1977
(24595) 3230 T-3	16 October 1977
(24596) 3574 T-3	12 October 1977
(24597) 4292 T-3	16 October 1977
(24598) 4366 T-3	16 October 1977
(24599) 5099 T-3	16 October 1977
24603 Mekistheus	24 September 1973
(26014) 2051 P-L	24 September 1960
(26015) 2076 P-L	26 September 1960
(26016) 2633 P-L	24 September 1960
(26017) 2674 P-L	24 September 1960
(26018) 2695 P-L	24 September 1960
(26019) 2768 P-L	24 September 1960
(26020) 3094 P-L	24 September 1960
(26021) 4177 P-L	24 September 1960
(26022) 4180 P-L	24 September 1960
(26023) 4538 P-L	24 September 1960
(26024) 4543 P-L	24 September 1960
(26025) 4587 P-L	24 September 1960
(26026) 4664 P-L	24 September 1960
26027 Cotopaxi	24 September 1960
(26028) 5554 P-L	17 October 1960
(26029) 5565 P-L	17 October 1960
(26030) 6004 P-L	24 September 1960
(26031) 6074 P-L	24 September 1960

(26032) 6556 P-L	24 September 1960
(26033) 6801 P-L	24 September 1960
(26034) 9611 P-L	17 October 1960
(26035) 1119 T-1	25 March 1971
(26036) 2166 T-1	25 March 1971
(26037) 2183 T-1	25 March 1971
(26038) 2290 T-1	25 March 1971
(26039) 3268 T-1	26 March 1971
(26040) 3747 T-1	13 May 1971
(26041) 4172 T-1	26 March 1971
(26042) 4242 T-1	26 March 1971
(26043) 4319 T-1	26 March 1971
(26044) 1259 T-2	29 September 1973
(26045) 1582 T-2	24 September 1973
(26046) 2104 T-2	29 September 1973
(26047) 2148 T-2	29 September 1973
(26048) 2409 T-2	25 September 1973
(26049) 3161 T-2	30 September 1973
(26050) 3167 T-2	30 September 1973
(26051) 3200 T-2	30 September 1973
(26052) 3230 T-2	30 September 1973
(26053) 4081 T-2	29 September 1973
(26054) 4231 T-2	29 September 1973
(26055) 4257 T-2	29 September 1973
(26056) 4281 T-2	29 September 1973

26057 Ankaios	30 September 1973
(26058) 1061 T-3	17 October 1977
(26059) 1089 T-3	17 October 1977
(26060) 1164 T-3	17 October 1977
(26061) 2315 T-3	16 October 1977
(26062) 2466 T-3	16 October 1977
(26063) 2634 T-3	16 October 1977
(26064) 3500 T-3	16 October 1977
(26065) 3761 T-3	16 October 1977
(26066) 4031 T-3	16 October 1977
(26067) 4079 T-3	16 October 1977
(26068) 4093 T-3	16 October 1977
(26069) 4215 T-3	16 October 1977
(26070) 4240 T-3	16 October 1977
(26071) 4335 T-3	16 October 1977
(26072) 5155 T-3	16 October 1977
(26073) 5168 T-3	16 October 1977
26761 Stromboli	24 September 1960
(26762) 2564 P-L	24 September 1960
26763 Peirithoos	24 September 1960
(26764) 2800 P-L	24 September 1960
(26765) 3038 P-L	24 September 1960
(26766) 3052 P-L	24 September 1960
(26767) 4084 P-L	24 September 1960
(26768) 4608 P-L	24 September 1960

(26769) 4658 P-L	24 September 1960
(26770) 4734 P-L	24 September 1960
(26771) 4846 P-L	24 September 1960
(26772) 6033 P-L	24 September 1960
(26773) 3254 T-1	26 March 1971
(26774) 4189 T-1	26 March 1971
(26775) 4205 T-1	26 March 1971
(26776) 4236 T-1	26 March 1971
(26777) 1225 T-2	29 September 1973
(26778) 1354 T-2	29 September 1973
(26779) 2191 T-2	29 September 1973
(26780) 2313 T-2	29 September 1973
(26781) 3182 T-2	30 September 1973
(26782) 4174 T-2	29 September 1973
(26783) 1085 T-3	17 October 1977
(26784) 2103 T-3	16 October 1977
(26785) 2496 T-3	16 October 1977
(26786) 3382 T-3	16 October 1977
(26787) 4265 T-3	16 October 1977
(26788) 4321 T-3	16 October 1977
(26789) 5092 T-3	16 October 1977
(26790) 5235 T-3	17 October 1977
(26791) 5282 T-3	17 October 1977
(27627) 2038 P-L	24 September 1960
(27628) 2041 P-L	24 September 1960

(27629) 2054 P-L	26 September 1960
(27630) 2228 P-L	17 October 1960
(27631) 3106 P-L	24 September 1960
(27632) 3539 P-L	17 October 1960
(27633) 4005 P-L	24 September 1960
(27634) 4200 P-L	24 September 1960
(27635) 4528 P-L	24 September 1960
(27636) 4778 P-L	24 September 1960
(27637) 2070 T-1	25 March 1971
(27638) 2287 T-1	25 March 1971
(27639) 3156 T-1	26 March 1971
(27640) 3273 T-1	26 March 1971
(27641) 4131 T-1	26 March 1971
(27642) 4281 T-1	26 March 1971
(27643) 1093 T-2	29 September 1973
(27644) 1343 T-2	29 September 1973
(27645) 2074 T-2	29 September 1973
(27646) 2266 T-2	29 September 1973
(27647) 2312 T-2	29 September 1973
(27648) 3222 T-2	30 September 1973
(27649) 3327 T-2	25 September 1973
(27650) 5137 T-2	25 September 1973
(27651) 2025 T-3	16 October 1977
(27652) 2462 T-3	16 October 1977
(27653) 4208 T-3	16 October 1977

(27654) 5739 T-3	16 October 1977
(28997) 2020 P-L	24 September 1960
(28998) 2184 P-L	24 September 1960
(28999) 2505 P-L	24 September 1960
(29000) 2607 P-L	24 September 1960
(29001) 2615 P-L	24 September 1960
(29002) 2708 P-L	24 September 1960
(29003) 2760 P-L	24 September 1960
(29004) 2767 P-L	24 September 1960
(29005) 2784 P-L	24 September 1960
(29006) 3091 P-L	24 September 1960
(29007) 4022 P-L	24 September 1960
(29008) 4044 P-L	24 September 1960
(29009) 4074 P-L	24 September 1960
(29010) 4100 P-L	24 September 1960
(29011) 4184 P-L	24 September 1960
(29012) 4285 P-L	24 September 1960
(29013) 4291 P-L	24 September 1960
(29014) 4536 P-L	24 September 1960
(29015) 4544 P-L	24 September 1960
(29016) 4591 P-L	24 September 1960
(29017) 4601 P-L	24 September 1960
(29018) 6062 P-L	24 September 1960
(29019) 6095 P-L	24 September 1960
(29020) 6274 P-L	24 September 1960

(29021) 6613 P-L	24 September 1960
(29022) 6630 P-L	24 September 1960
(29023) 6667 P-L	24 September 1960
(29024) 6685 P-L	24 September 1960
(29025) 6710 P-L	24 September 1960
(29026) 6774 P-L	24 September 1960
(29027) 7587 P-L	17 October 1960
(29028) 9097 P-L	17 October 1960
(29029) 9549 P-L	17 October 1960
(29030) 1034 T-1	25 March 1971
(29031) 1132 T-1	25 March 1971
(29032) 2059 T-1	25 March 1971
(29033) 2085 T-1	25 March 1971
(29034) 2149 T-1	25 March 1971
(29035) 2214 T-1	25 March 1971
(29036) 3075 T-1	26 March 1971
(29037) 3165 T-1	26 March 1971
(29038) 4030 T-1	26 March 1971
(29039) 4514 T-1	13 May 1971
(29040) 1002 T-2	29 September 1973
(29041) 1050 T-2	29 September 1973
(29042) 1426 T-2	29 September 1973
(29043) 2024 T-2	29 September 1973
(29044) 2154 T-2	29 September 1973
(29045) 2255 T-2	29 September 1973

(29046) 2268 T-2	29 September 1973
(29047) 2278 T-2	29 September 1973
(29048) 3069 T-2	30 September 1973
(29049) 3083 T-2	30 September 1973
(29050) 3333 T-2	25 September 1973
(29051) 4212 T-2	29 September 1973
(29052) 4258 T-2	29 September 1973
29053 Muskau	30 September 1973
(29054) 5097 T-2	25 September 1973
(29055) 5118 T-2	25 September 1973
(29056) 1055 T-3	17 October 1977
(29057) 1083 T-3	17 October 1977
(29058) 2077 T-3	16 October 1977
(29059) 2151 T-3	16 October 1977
(29060) 2157 T-3	16 October 1977
(29061) 2193 T-3	16 October 1977
(29062) 2324 T-3	16 October 1977
(29063) 2369 T-3	16 October 1977
(29064) 3129 T-3	16 October 1977
(29065) 3447 T-3	16 October 1977
(29066) 3527 T-3	16 October 1977
(29067) 3856 T-3	16 October 1977
(29068) 4234 T-3	16 October 1977
(29069) 4310 T-3	16 October 1977
(29070) 4316 T-3	16 October 1977

(29071) 5048 T-3	16 October 1977
(29072) 5089 T-3	16 October 1977
(29073) 5130 T-3	16 October 1977
(29074) 5160 T-3	16 October 1977
(30599) 2052 P-L	24 September 1960
(30600) 2078 P-L	26 September 1960
(30601) 2082 P-L	24 September 1960
(30602) 2086 P-L	24 September 1960
(30603) 2106 P-L	24 September 1960
(30604) 2107 P-L	24 September 1960
(30605) 2204 P-L	24 September 1960
(30606) 2503 P-L	26 September 1960
(30607) 2507 P-L	24 September 1960
(30608) 2573 P-L	24 September 1960
(30609) 2618 P-L	24 September 1960
(30610) 2623 P-L	24 September 1960
(30611) 2627 P-L	24 September 1960
(30612) 2638 P-L	24 September 1960
(30613) 2678 P-L	24 September 1960
(30614) 2778 P-L	24 September 1960
(30615) 2818 P-L	24 September 1960
(30616) 3049 P-L	24 September 1960
(30617) 3068 P-L	25 September 1960
(30618) 3084 P-L	25 September 1960
(30619) 4045 P-L	24 September 1960

(30620) 4126 P-L	24 September 1960
(30621) 4189 P-L	24 September 1960
(30622) 4213 P-L	24 September 1960
(30623) 4226 P-L	25 September 1960
(30624) 4232 P-L	24 September 1960
(30625) 4236 P-L	24 September 1960
(30626) 4240 P-L	24 September 1960
(30627) 4269 P-L	24 September 1960
(30628) 4644 P-L	24 September 1960
(30629) 4667 P-L	26 September 1960
(30630) 4733 P-L	24 September 1960
(30631) 6026 P-L	24 September 1960
(30632) 6117 P-L	26 September 1960
(30633) 6120 P-L	24 September 1960
(30634) 6128 P-L	24 September 1960
(30635) 6186 P-L	24 September 1960
(30636) 6190 P-L	24 September 1960
(30637) 6196 P-L	24 September 1960
(30638) 6237 P-L	24 September 1960
(30639) 6246 P-L	24 September 1960
(30640) 6319 P-L	24 September 1960
(30641) 6349 P-L	24 September 1960
(30642) 6532 P-L	24 September 1960
(30643) 6590 P-L	24 September 1960
(30644) 6601 P-L	24 September 1960

(30645) 6604 P-L	24 September 1960
(30646) 6623 P-L	24 September 1960
(30647) 6642 P-L	24 September 1960
(30648) 6679 P-L	24 September 1960
(30649) 6871 P-L	24 September 1960
(30650) 7638 P-L	17 October 1960
(30651) 9588 P-L	17 October 1960
(30652) 1236 T-1	25 March 1971
(30653) 2190 T-1	25 March 1971
(30654) 2234 T-1	25 March 1971
(30655) 2289 T-1	25 March 1971
(30656) 3098 T-1	26 March 1971
(30657) 3258 T-1	26 March 1971
(30658) 4042 T-1	26 March 1971
(30659) 4109 T-1	26 March 1971
(30660) 4142 T-1	26 March 1971
(30661) 4166 T-1	26 March 1971
(30662) 4256 T-1	26 March 1971
(30663) 1026 T-2	29 September 1973
(30664) 1040 T-2	29 September 1973
(30665) 1144 T-2	29 September 1973
(30666) 1156 T-2	29 September 1973
(30667) 1177 T-2	29 September 1973
(30668) 1227 T-2	29 September 1973
(30669) 1234 T-2	29 September 1973

(30670) 1283 T-2	29 September 1973
(30671) 1314 T-2	29 September 1973
(30672) 1346 T-2	29 September 1973
(30673) 1409 T-2	30 September 1973
(30674) 1455 T-2	30 September 1973
(30675) 2042 T-2	29 September 1973
(30676) 2201 T-2	29 September 1973
(30677) 2231 T-2	29 September 1973
(30678) 2265 T-2	29 September 1973
(30679) 2303 T-2	29 September 1973
(30680) 3029 T-2	30 September 1973
(30681) 3084 T-2	30 September 1973
(30682) 3209 T-2	30 September 1973
(30683) 3211 T-2	30 September 1973
(30684) 3237 T-2	30 September 1973
(30685) 3243 T-2	30 September 1973
(30686) 3288 T-2	30 September 1973
(30687) 3347 T-2	25 September 1973
(30688) 4194 T-2	29 September 1973
(30689) 4318 T-2	29 September 1973
(30690) 4633 T-2	30 September 1973
(30691) 4810 T-2	25 September 1973
(30692) 5040 T-2	25 September 1973
(30693) 5069 T-2	25 September 1973
(30694) 5112 T-2	25 September 1973

(30695) 1020 T-3	17 October 1977
(30696) 1110 T-3	17 October 1977
(30697) 2137 T-3	16 October 1977
30698 Hippokoon	16 October 1977
(30699) 2356 T-3	16 October 1977
(30700) 2367 T-3	16 October 1977
(30701) 2381 T-3	16 October 1977
(30702) 3042 T-3	16 October 1977
(30703) 3101 T-3	16 October 1977
30704 Phegeus	16 October 1977
30705 Idaios	16 October 1977
(30706) 4026 T-3	16 October 1977
(30707) 4075 T-3	16 October 1977
30708 Echepolos	16 October 1977
(30709) 4107 T-3	16 October 1977
(30710) 4137 T-3	16 October 1977
(30711) 4186 T-3	16 October 1977
(30712) 4207 T-3	16 October 1977
(30713) 4216 T-3	16 October 1977
(30714) 4282 T-3	16 October 1977
(30715) 5034 T-3	16 October 1977
(30716) 5107 T-3	16 October 1977
(32637) 2021 P-L	24 September 1960
(32638) 2042 P-L	24 September 1960
(32639) 2050 P-L	24 September 1960

(32640) 2531 P-L	24 September 1960
(32641) 2595 P-L	24 September 1960
(32642) 2601 P-L	24 September 1960
(32643) 2609 P-L	24 September 1960
(32644) 2723 P-L	24 September 1960
(32645) 2763 P-L	24 September 1960
(32646) 3010 P-L	24 September 1960
(32647) 3109 P-L	24 September 1960
(32648) 3538 P-L	17 October 1960
(32649) 4056 P-L	24 September 1960
(32650) 4070 P-L	24 September 1960
(32651) 4208 P-L	24 September 1960
(32652) 4319 P-L	24 September 1960
(32653) 4635 P-L	24 September 1960
(32654) 4640 P-L	24 September 1960
(32655) 4692 P-L	24 September 1960
(32656) 4711 P-L	24 September 1960
(32657) 4721 P-L	24 September 1960
(32658) 4800 P-L	24 September 1960
(32659) 4804 P-L	24 September 1960
(32660) 4826 P-L	24 September 1960
(32661) 4848 P-L	24 September 1960
(32662) 4900 P-L	24 September 1960
(32663) 5553 P-L	17 October 1960
(32664) 6072 P-L	24 September 1960

(32665) 6107 P-L	24 September 1960
(32666) 6124 P-L	24 September 1960
(32667) 6180 P-L	24 September 1960
(32668) 6278 P-L	24 September 1960
(32669) 6287 P-L	24 September 1960
(32670) 6323 P-L	24 September 1960
(32671) 6537 P-L	24 September 1960
(32672) 6720 P-L	24 September 1960
(32673) 6742 P-L	24 September 1960
(32674) 6750 P-L	24 September 1960
(32675) 6755 P-L	24 September 1960
(32676) 6802 P-L	24 September 1960
(32677) 6806 P-L	24 September 1960
(32678) 7566 P-L	17 October 1960
(32679) 1070 T-1	25 March 1971
(32680) 1095 T-1	25 March 1971
(32681) 1166 T-1	25 March 1971
(32682) 1177 T-1	25 March 1971
(32683) 1202 T-1	25 March 1971
(32684) 1269 T-1	25 March 1971
(32685) 1294 T-1	25 March 1971
(32686) 2072 T-1	25 March 1971
(32687) 3166 T-1	26 March 1971
(32688) 4025 T-1	26 March 1971
(32689) 4043 T-1	26 March 1971

(32690) 4075 T-1	26 March 1971
(32691) 4269 T-1	26 March 1971
(32692) 4329 T-1	26 March 1971
(32693) 4339 T-1	26 March 1971
(32694) 4408 T-1	26 March 1971
(32695) 1016 T-2	29 September 1973
(32696) 1055 T-2	29 September 1973
(32697) 1069 T-2	29 September 1973
(32698) 1104 T-2	29 September 1973
(32699) 1286 T-2	29 September 1973
(32700) 1351 T-2	29 September 1973
(32701) 1353 T-2	29 September 1973
(32702) 2028 T-2	29 September 1973
(32703) 2087 T-2	29 September 1973
(32704) 2140 T-2	29 September 1973
(32705) 2157 T-2	29 September 1973
(32706) 2212 T-2	29 September 1973
(32707) 3089 T-2	30 September 1973
(32708) 3160 T-2	30 September 1973
(32709) 3355 T-2	25 September 1973
(32710) 4063 T-2	29 September 1973
(32711) 4132 T-2	29 September 1973
(32712) 4135 T-2	29 September 1973
(32713) 4159 T-2	29 September 1973
(32714) 5008 T-2	25 September 1973

(32715) 5105 T-2	25 September 1973
(32716) 5133 T-2	25 September 1973
(32717) 5155 T-2	25 September 1973
(32718) 1103 T-3	17 October 1977
(32719) 1153 T-3	17 October 1977
32720 Simoeisios	16 October 1977
(32721) 2335 T-3	16 October 1977
(32722) 3340 T-3	16 October 1977
(32723) 4028 T-3	16 October 1977
32724 Woerlitz	16 October 1977
(32725) 4057 T-3	16 October 1977
32726 Chromios	16 October 1977
(32727) 4268 T-3	16 October 1977
(32728) 4517 T-3	16 October 1977
(32729) 5179 T-3	16 October 1977
(34894) 2012 P-L	24 September 1960
(34895) 2026 P-L	24 September 1960
(34896) 2117 P-L	24 September 1960
(34897) 2537 P-L	24 September 1960
(34898) 2622 P-L	24 September 1960
(34899) 2628 P-L	24 September 1960
(34900) 2698 P-L	24 September 1960
34901 Mauna Loa	24 September 1960
(34902) 2728 P-L	24 September 1960
(34903) 3037 P-L	24 September 1960

(34904) 3085 P-L	25 September 1960
(34905) 3110 P-L	24 September 1960
(34906) 3116 P-L	24 September 1960
(34907) 3527 P-L	17 October 1960
(34908) 3528 P-L	17 October 1960
(34909) 3534 P-L	17 October 1960
(34910) 4052 P-L	24 September 1960
(34911) 4288 P-L	24 September 1960
(34912) 4314 P-L	24 September 1960
(34913) 4527 P-L	24 September 1960
(34914) 4535 P-L	24 September 1960
(34915) 4564 P-L	24 September 1960
(34916) 4595 P-L	24 September 1960
(34917) 4616 P-L	24 September 1960
(34918) 4654 P-L	24 September 1960
34919 Imelda	24 September 1960
(34920) 4735 P-L	24 September 1960
(34921) 4801 P-L	24 September 1960
(34922) 4825 P-L	24 September 1960
(34923) 4870 P-L	24 September 1960
(34924) 6109 P-L	24 September 1960
(34925) 6114 P-L	24 September 1960
(34926) 6133 P-L	24 September 1960
(34927) 6189 P-L	24 September 1960
(34928) 6230 P-L	24 September 1960

(34929) 6522 P-L	26 September 1960
(34930) 6570 P-L	24 September 1960
(34931) 6621 P-L	24 September 1960
(34932) 6644 P-L	26 September 1960
(34933) 6652 P-L	24 September 1960
(34934) 6689 P-L	24 September 1960
(34935) 6780 P-L	24 September 1960
(34936) 6861 P-L	24 September 1960
(34937) 9063 P-L	17 October 1960
(34938) 9562 P-L	17 October 1960
(34939) 9575 P-L	17 October 1960
(34940) 9586 P-L	17 October 1960
(34941) 1244 T-1	25 March 1971
(34942) 1275 T-1	25 March 1971
(34943) 1286 T-1	25 March 1971
(34944) 2202 T-1	25 March 1971
(34945) 2263 T-1	25 March 1971
(34946) 2286 T-1	25 March 1971
(34947) 3298 T-1	26 March 1971
(34948) 4103 T-1	26 March 1971
(34949) 4111 T-1	26 March 1971
(34950) 4188 T-1	26 March 1971
(34951) 4221 T-1	26 March 1971
(34952) 4874 T-1	13 May 1971
(34953) 1008 T-2	29 September 1973

(34954) 1032 T-2	29 September 1973
(34955) 1044 T-2	29 September 1973
(34956) 1327 T-2	29 September 1973
(34957) 1347 T-2	29 September 1973
(34958) 1357 T-2	29 September 1973
(34959) 2077 T-2	29 September 1973
(34960) 2100 T-2	29 September 1973
(34961) 2252 T-2	29 September 1973
(34962) 2307 T-2	29 September 1973
(34963) 3091 T-2	30 September 1973
(34964) 3122 T-2	30 September 1973
(34965) 3221 T-2	30 September 1973
(34966) 3260 T-2	30 September 1973
(34967) 3269 T-2	30 September 1973
(34968) 4094 T-2	29 September 1973
(34969) 4108 T-2	29 September 1973
(34970) 4218 T-2	29 September 1973
(34971) 4286 T-2	29 September 1973
(34972) 5039 T-2	25 September 1973
(34973) 5157 T-2	25 September 1973
(34974) 5164 T-2	25 September 1973
(34975) 1050 T-3	17 October 1977
(34976) 1115 T-3	17 October 1977
(34977) 1167 T-3	17 October 1977
(34978) 1901 T-3	17 October 1977

(34979) 2173 T-3	16 October 1977
(34980) 2307 T-3	16 October 1977
(34981) 2342 T-3	16 October 1977
(34982) 2494 T-3	16 October 1977
(34983) 3046 T-3	16 October 1977
(34984) 3163 T-3	16 October 1977
(34985) 3286 T-3	16 October 1977
(34986) 3837 T-3	16 October 1977
(34987) 4065 T-3	16 October 1977
(34988) 4222 T-3	16 October 1977
(34989) 4251 T-3	16 October 1977
(34990) 4270 T-3	16 October 1977
(34991) 4295 T-3	16 October 1977
(34992) 4418 T-3	16 October 1977
34993 Euaimon	20 September 1973
(37435) 2111 P-L	24 September 1960
(37436) 2201 P-L	24 September 1960
(37437) 2576 P-L	24 September 1960
(37438) 2599 P-L	24 September 1960
(37439) 2610 P-L	24 September 1960
(37440) 2612 P-L	24 September 1960
(37441) 2700 P-L	24 September 1960
(37442) 2722 P-L	24 September 1960
(37443) 2788 P-L	26 September 1960
(37444) 2793 P-L	26 September 1960

(37445) 3056 P-L	24 September 1960
(37446) 4067 P-L	24 September 1960
(37447) 4162 P-L	24 September 1960
(37448) 4218 P-L	24 September 1960
(37449) 4235 P-L	24 September 1960
(37450) 4257 P-L	24 September 1960
(37451) 4280 P-L	24 September 1960
37452 Spirit	24 September 1960
(37453) 4311 P-L	24 September 1960
(37454) 4636 P-L	24 September 1960
(37455) 4727 P-L	24 September 1960
(37456) 4790 P-L	24 September 1960
(37457) 4793 P-L	24 September 1960
(37458) 5008 P-L	22 October 1960
(37459) 6037 P-L	24 September 1960
(37460) 6102 P-L	24 September 1960
(37461) 6112 P-L	24 September 1960
(37462) 6293 P-L	24 September 1960
(37463) 6338 P-L	24 September 1960
(37464) 6352 P-L	24 September 1960
(37465) 6618 P-L	24 September 1960
(37466) 6727 P-L	24 September 1960
(37467) 6753 P-L	24 September 1960
(37468) 6782 P-L	24 September 1960
(37469) 6833 P-L	24 September 1960

(37470) 6834 P-L	24 September 1960
37471 Popocatepetl	17 October 1960
(37472) 7613 P-L	17 October 1960
(37473) 9066 P-L	24 September 1960
(37474) 9618 P-L	17 October 1960
(37475) 1038 T-1	25 March 1971
(37476) 1107 T-1	25 March 1971
(37477) 1110 T-1	25 March 1971
(37478) 1120 T-1	25 March 1971
(37479) 1130 T-1	25 March 1971
(37480) 1149 T-1	25 March 1971
(37481) 1209 T-1	25 March 1971
(37482) 2114 T-1	25 March 1971
(37483) 2125 T-1	25 March 1971
(37484) 2174 T-1	25 March 1971
(37485) 2211 T-1	25 March 1971
(37486) 2282 T-1	25 March 1971
(37487) 3150 T-1	26 March 1971
(37488) 3203 T-1	26 March 1971
(37489) 4396 T-1	26 March 1971
(37490) 1082 T-2	29 September 1973
(37491) 1112 T-2	29 September 1973
(37492) 1115 T-2	29 September 1973
(37493) 1171 T-2	29 September 1973
(37494) 1174 T-2	29 September 1973

(37495) 1226 T-2	29 September 1973
(37496) 1287 T-2	29 September 1973
(37497) 1330 T-2	29 September 1973
(37498) 1507 T-2	30 September 1973
(37499) 2033 T-2	29 September 1973
(37500) 2118 T-2	29 September 1973
(37501) 2130 T-2	29 September 1973
(37502) 2257 T-2	29 September 1973
(37503) 2288 T-2	29 September 1973
(37504) 3052 T-2	30 September 1973
(37505) 3062 T-2	30 September 1973
(37506) 3107 T-2	30 September 1973
(37507) 3141 T-2	30 September 1973
(37508) 3190 T-2	30 September 1973
(37509) 3192 T-2	30 September 1973
(37510) 3235 T-2	30 September 1973
(37511) 3303 T-2	30 September 1973
(37512) 4197 T-2	29 September 1973
(37513) 5068 T-2	25 September 1973
(37514) 1118 T-3	17 October 1977
(37515) 2008 T-3	16 October 1977
(37516) 2027 T-3	16 October 1977
(37517) 2134 T-3	16 October 1977
(37518) 2410 T-3	16 October 1977
37519 Amphios	16 October 1977

(37520) 3193 T-3	16 October 1977
(37521) 3280 T-3	16 October 1977
(37522) 3367 T-3	16 October 1977
(37523) 4076 T-3	16 October 1977
(37524) 4375 T-3	16 October 1977
(37525) 5127 T-3	16 October 1977
(37526) 5721 T-3	16 October 1977
(39378) 2101 P-L	24 September 1960
(39379) 2120 P-L	24 September 1960
(39380) 2169 P-L	24 September 1960
(39381) 2603 P-L	24 September 1960
39382 Opportunity	24 September 1960
(39383) 2765 P-L	24 September 1960
(39384) 2814 P-L	24 September 1960
(39385) 4017 P-L	24 September 1960
(39386) 4039 P-L	24 September 1960
(39387) 4150 P-L	24 September 1960
(39388) 4190 P-L	24 September 1960
(39389) 4191 P-L	24 September 1960
(39390) 4839 P-L	24 September 1960
(39391) 4885 P-L	24 September 1960
(39392) 4893 P-L	24 September 1960
(39393) 5564 P-L	17 October 1960
(39394) 6027 P-L	24 September 1960
(39395) 6199 P-L	24 September 1960

(39396) 6243 P-L	24 September 1960
(39397) 6514 P-L	24 September 1960
(39398) 6609 P-L	24 September 1960
(39399) 6688 P-L	24 September 1960
(39400) 6808 P-L	24 September 1960
(39401) 7572 P-L	27 September 1960
(39402) 9074 P-L	17 October 1960
(39403) 9514 P-L	22 October 1960
(39404) 9582 P-L	17 October 1960
39405 Mosigkau	25 March 1971
(39406) 1145 T-1	25 March 1971
(39407) 1187 T-1	25 March 1971
(39408) 1273 T-1	26 March 1971
(39409) 2100 T-1	25 March 1971
(39410) 2191 T-1	25 March 1971
(39411) 2266 T-1	25 March 1971
(39412) 3097 T-1	26 March 1971
(39413) 3113 T-1	26 March 1971
(39414) 3283 T-1	26 March 1971
39415 Janeausten	26 March 1971
(39416) 1024 T-2	29 September 1973
(39417) 1100 T-2	29 September 1973
(39418) 1204 T-2	29 September 1973
(39419) 1244 T-2	29 September 1973
39420 Elizabethgaskell	29 September 1973

(39421) 2128 T-2	29 September 1973
(39422) 3109 T-2	30 September 1973
(39423) 3136 T-2	30 September 1973
(39424) 3143 T-2	30 September 1973
(39425) 3240 T-2	30 September 1973
(39426) 3278 T-2	30 September 1973
39427 Charlottebrontë	25 September 1973
39428 Emilybrontë	29 September 1973
39429 Annebrontë	29 September 1973
(39430) 4264 T-2	29 September 1973
(39431) 5178 T-2	25 September 1973
(39432) 1079 T-3	17 October 1977
(39433) 1113 T-3	17 October 1977
(39434) 1202 T-3	17 October 1977
(39435) 2029 T-3	16 October 1977
(39436) 2162 T-3	16 October 1977
(39437) 2203 T-3	16 October 1977
(39438) 2218 T-3	16 October 1977
(39439) 2242 T-3	16 October 1977
(39440) 2282 T-3	16 October 1977
(39441) 2293 T-3	16 October 1977
(39442) 2384 T-3	16 October 1977
(39443) 2394 T-3	16 October 1977
(39444) 3264 T-3	16 October 1977
(39445) 3336 T-3	16 October 1977

(39446) 3348 T-3	16 October 1977
(39447) 3412 T-3	16 October 1977
(39448) 3455 T-3	16 October 1977
(39449) 3486 T-3	16 October 1977
(39450) 3552 T-3	16 October 1977
(39451) 3992 T-3	16 October 1977
(39452) 4027 T-3	16 October 1977
(39453) 4070 T-3	16 October 1977
(39454) 4082 T-3	16 October 1977
(39455) 4091 T-3	16 October 1977
(39456) 4120 T-3	16 October 1977
(39457) 4167 T-3	16 October 1977
(39458) 4198 T-3	16 October 1977
(39459) 4266 T-3	16 October 1977
(39460) 4332 T-3	16 October 1977
(39461) 5019 T-3	16 October 1977
(39462) 5175 T-3	16 October 1977
39463 Phyleus	19 September 1973
(42379) 2013 P-L	24 September 1960
(42380) 2065 P-L	24 September 1960
(42381) 2090 P-L	24 September 1960
(42382) 2183 P-L	24 September 1960
(42383) 2231 P-L	24 September 1960
(42384) 2506 P-L	24 September 1960
(42385) 2844 P-L	24 September 1960

(42386) 3552 P-L	22 October 1960
(42387) 4071 P-L	24 September 1960
(42388) 4111 P-L	24 September 1960
(42389) 4251 P-L	24 September 1960
(42390) 4305 P-L	24 September 1960
(42391) 4753 P-L	24 September 1960
(42392) 4908 P-L	24 September 1960
(42393) 6012 P-L	24 September 1960
(42394) 6111 P-L	24 September 1960
(42395) 6193 P-L	24 September 1960
(42396) 6213 P-L	24 September 1960
(42397) 6326 P-L	24 September 1960
(42398) 6370 P-L	24 September 1960
(42399) 6372 P-L	24 September 1960
(42400) 6587 P-L	24 September 1960
(42401) 6589 P-L	24 September 1960
(42402) 6619 P-L	24 September 1960
42403 Andraimon	24 September 1960
(42404) 7606 P-L	17 October 1960
(42405) 9085 P-L	27 September 1960
(42406) 9104 P-L	24 September 1960
(42407) 9509 P-L	22 October 1960
(42408) 9555 P-L	17 October 1960
(42409) 1108 T-1	25 March 1971
(42410) 3062 T-1	26 March 1971

(42411) 3249 T-1	26 March 1971
(42412) 4320 T-1	26 March 1971
(42413) 1072 T-2	29 September 1973
(42414) 1130 T-2	29 September 1973
(42415) 1175 T-2	29 September 1973
(42416) 1195 T-2	29 September 1973
(42417) 1613 T-2	24 September 1973
(42418) 2081 T-2	29 September 1973
(42419) 2187 T-2	29 September 1973
(42420) 2290 T-2	29 September 1973
(42421) 2306 T-2	29 September 1973
(42422) 3048 T-2	30 September 1973
(42423) 3085 T-2	30 September 1973
(42424) 3120 T-2	30 September 1973
(42425) 3227 T-2	30 September 1973
(42426) 4634 T-2	30 September 1973
(42427) 5061 T-2	25 September 1973
(42428) 5089 T-2	25 September 1973
(42429) 5132 T-2	25 September 1973
(42430) 5158 T-2	25 September 1973
(42431) 1051 T-3	17 October 1977
(42432) 1134 T-3	17 October 1977
(42433) 1887 T-3	17 October 1977
(42434) 2121 T-3	16 October 1977
(42435) 2164 T-3	16 October 1977

(42436) 2204 T-3	16 October 1977
(42437) 2266 T-3	16 October 1977
(42438) 2317 T-3	16 October 1977
(42439) 2355 T-3	16 October 1977
(42440) 2484 T-3	16 October 1977
(42441) 2492 T-3	16 October 1977
(42442) 2603 T-3	16 October 1977
(42443) 2640 T-3	16 October 1977
(42444) 3064 T-3	16 October 1977
(42445) 3123 T-3	16 October 1977
(42446) 3248 T-3	16 October 1977
(42447) 3265 T-3	16 October 1977
(42448) 3393 T-3	16 October 1977
(42449) 3496 T-3	16 October 1977
(42450) 3504 T-3	16 October 1977
(42451) 3727 T-3	16 October 1977
(42452) 3970 T-3	16 October 1977
(42453) 4055 T-3	16 October 1977
(42454) 4134 T-3	16 October 1977
(42455) 4293 T-3	16 October 1977
(42456) 4322 T-3	16 October 1977
(42457) 4341 T-3	16 October 1977
(42458) 4359 T-3	16 October 1977
(42459) 5036 T-3	16 October 1977
(42460) 5106 T-3	16 October 1977

(42461) 5184 T-3	16 October 1977
(42462) 5278 T-3	17 October 1977
(42463) 5601 T-3	16 October 1977
(43692) 2160 P-L	24 September 1960
(43693) 2731 P-L	24 September 1960
(43694) 2846 P-L	24 September 1960
(43695) 4079 P-L	24 September 1960
(43696) 4159 P-L	24 September 1960
(43697) 4620 P-L	24 September 1960
(43698) 4878 P-L	26 September 1960
(43699) 6586 P-L	24 September 1960
(43700) 6820 P-L	24 September 1960
(43701) 1115 T-1	25 March 1971
(43702) 1142 T-1	25 March 1971
(43703) 1276 T-1	25 March 1971
(43704) 3225 T-1	26 March 1971
(43705) 1131 T-2	29 September 1973
43706 Iphiklos	29 September 1973
(43707) 2050 T-2	29 September 1973
(43708) 2126 T-2	29 September 1973
(43709) 2284 T-2	29 September 1973
(43710) 2907 T-2	30 September 1973
(43711) 3005 T-2	30 September 1973
(43712) 5054 T-2	25 September 1973
(43713) 5104 T-2	25 September 1973

(43714) 1048 T-3	17 October 1977
(43715) 1084 T-3	17 October 1977
(43716) 1096 T-3	17 October 1977
(43717) 2023 T-3	16 October 1977
(43718) 2208 T-3	16 October 1977
(43719) 2666 T-3	11 October 1977
(43720) 4301 T-3	16 October 1977
(43721) 4433 T-3	16 October 1977
(46444) 2089 P-L	24 September 1960
(46445) 2102 P-L	24 September 1960
(46446) 2110 P-L	24 September 1960
(46447) 2208 P-L	24 September 1960
(46448) 2829 P-L	24 September 1960
(46449) 3036 P-L	24 September 1960
(46450) 3039 P-L	24 September 1960
(46451) 3050 P-L	24 September 1960
(46452) 3097 P-L	24 September 1960
(46453) 4013 P-L	24 September 1960
(46454) 4029 P-L	24 September 1960
(46455) 4054 P-L	24 September 1960
(46456) 4140 P-L	24 September 1960
(46457) 4166 P-L	24 September 1960
(46458) 4244 P-L	24 September 1960
(46459) 4540 P-L	24 September 1960
(46460) 4798 P-L	24 September 1960

(46461) 6105 P-L	24 September 1960
(46462) 6179 P-L	24 September 1960
(46463) 6290 P-L	24 September 1960
(46464) 6602 P-L	24 September 1960
(46465) 6617 P-L	24 September 1960
(46466) 6622 P-L	24 September 1960
(46467) 6730 P-L	24 September 1960
(46468) 6887 P-L	24 September 1960
(46469) 9572 P-L	17 October 1960
(46470) 9607 P-L	17 October 1960
(46471) 1160 T-1	25 March 1971
(46472) 2155 T-1	25 March 1971
(46473) 3066 T-1	26 March 1971
(46474) 3109 T-1	26 March 1971
(46475) 3204 T-1	26 March 1971
(46476) 4208 T-1	26 March 1971
(46477) 4266 T-1	26 March 1971
(46478) 1097 T-2	29 September 1973
(46479) 1150 T-2	29 September 1973
(46480) 1170 T-2	29 September 1973
(46481) 1198 T-2	29 September 1973
(46482) 1460 T-2	30 September 1973
(46483) 1549 T-2	24 September 1973
(46484) 2245 T-2	29 September 1973
(46485) 2279 T-2	29 September 1973

(46486) 3113 T-2	30 September 1973
(46487) 3322 T-2	25 September 1973
(46488) 3335 T-2	24 September 1973
(46489) 4156 T-2	29 September 1973
(46490) 4164 T-2	29 September 1973
(46491) 5070 T-2	25 September 1973
(46492) 1023 T-3	17 October 1977
(46493) 1032 T-3	17 October 1977
(46494) 1088 T-3	17 October 1977
(46495) 1123 T-3	17 October 1977
(46496) 1157 T-3	17 October 1977
(46497) 2214 T-3	17 October 1977
(46498) 2240 T-3	16 October 1977
(46499) 2409 T-3	16 October 1977
(46500) 2610 T-3	16 October 1977
(46501) 2616 T-3	16 October 1977
(46502) 3084 T-3	16 October 1977
(46503) 3191 T-3	16 October 1977
(46504) 3194 T-3	16 October 1977
(46505) 3195 T-3	16 October 1977
(46506) 3387 T-3	16 October 1977
(46507) 3479 T-3	16 October 1977
(46508) 3554 T-3	16 October 1977
(46509) 4149 T-3	16 October 1977
(46510) 4323 T-3	16 October 1977

(46511) 4356 T-3	16 October 1977
(48343) 2180 P-L	24 September 1960
(48344) 2588 P-L	24 September 1960
(48345) 2662 P-L	24 September 1960
(48346) 3077 P-L	25 September 1960
(48347) 3567 P-L	22 October 1960
(48348) 4124 P-L	24 September 1960
(48349) 4239 P-L	24 September 1960
(48350) 6221 P-L	24 September 1960
(48351) 6250 P-L	24 September 1960
(48352) 6320 P-L	24 September 1960
(48353) 6616 P-L	24 September 1960
(48354) 1291 T-1	25 March 1971
(48355) 2184 T-1	25 March 1971
(48356) 3118 T-1	26 March 1971
(48357) 1013 T-2	29 September 1973
(48358) 1187 T-2	29 September 1973
(48359) 1219 T-2	29 September 1973
(48360) 1262 T-2	29 September 1973
(48361) 2022 T-2	29 September 1973
(48362) 2184 T-2	29 September 1973
(48363) 2192 T-2	29 September 1973
(48364) 3096 T-2	30 September 1973
(48365) 3106 T-2	30 September 1973
(48366) 3284 T-2	30 September 1973

(48367) 4127 T-2	29 September 1973
(48368) 4141 T-2	29 September 1973
(48369) 4153 T-2	29 September 1973
(48370) 1056 T-3	17 October 1977
(48371) 1173 T-3	17 October 1977
(48372) 1182 T-3	17 October 1977
48373 Gorgythion	16 October 1977
(48374) 2583 T-3	17 October 1977
(48375) 3320 T-3	16 October 1977
(48376) 4044 T-3	16 October 1977
(48377) 4047 T-3	16 October 1977
(48378) 4241 T-3	16 October 1977
(48379) 4672 T-3	17 October 1977
(48380) 5622 T-3	16 October 1977
(52088) 2014 P-L	24 September 1960
(52089) 2027 P-L	24 September 1960
(52090) 2046 P-L	24 September 1960
(52091) 2075 P-L	24 September 1960
(52092) 2083 P-L	24 September 1960
(52093) 2088 P-L	24 September 1960
(52094) 2177 P-L	24 September 1960
(52095) 2191 P-L	24 September 1960
(52096) 2221 P-L	24 September 1960
(52097) 2565 P-L	24 September 1960
(52098) 2568 P-L	24 September 1960

(52099) 2589 P-L	24 September 1960
(52100) 2591 P-L	24 September 1960
(52101) 2598 P-L	24 September 1960
(52102) 2616 P-L	24 September 1960
(52103) 2658 P-L	24 September 1960
(52104) 2660 P-L	24 September 1960
(52105) 2669 P-L	24 September 1960
(52106) 2673 P-L	24 September 1960
(52107) 2703 P-L	24 September 1960
(52108) 2830 P-L	24 September 1960
(52109) 2863 P-L	24 September 1960
(52110) 3007 P-L	24 September 1960
(52111) 3020 P-L	24 September 1960
(52112) 3064 P-L	25 September 1960
(52113) 3100 P-L	24 September 1960
(52114) 3118 P-L	24 September 1960
(52115) 3512 P-L	17 October 1960
(52116) 4032 P-L	24 September 1960
(52117) 4059 P-L	24 September 1960
(52118) 4103 P-L	24 September 1960
(52119) 4105 P-L	24 September 1960
(52120) 4106 P-L	24 September 1960
(52121) 4117 P-L	24 September 1960
(52122) 4128 P-L	24 September 1960
(52123) 4217 P-L	24 September 1960

(52124) 4272 P-L	24 September 1960
(52125) 4274 P-L	24 September 1960
(52126) 4284 P-L	24 September 1960
(52127) 4681 P-L	24 September 1960
(52128) 4693 P-L	24 September 1960
(52129) 4796 P-L	24 September 1960
(52130) 4882 P-L	26 September 1960
(52131) 4892 P-L	24 September 1960
(52132) 5034 P-L	17 October 1960
(52133) 6007 P-L	24 September 1960
(52134) 6059 P-L	24 September 1960
(52135) 6070 P-L	24 September 1960
(52136) 6076 P-L	24 September 1960
(52137) 6080 P-L	24 September 1960
(52138) 6131 P-L	24 September 1960
(52139) 6192 P-L	24 September 1960
(52140) 6603 P-L	24 September 1960
(52141) 6605 P-L	24 September 1960
(52142) 6610 P-L	24 September 1960
(52143) 6635 P-L	24 September 1960
(52144) 6759 P-L	24 September 1960
(52145) 6832 P-L	24 September 1960
(52146) 7061 P-L	17 October 1960
(52147) 9061 P-L	17 October 1960
(52148) 9506 P-L	17 October 1960

(52149) 1074 T-1	25 March 1971
(52150) 1097 T-1	25 March 1971
(52151) 1180 T-1	25 March 1971
(52152) 1296 T-1	25 March 1971
(52153) 2043 T-1	25 March 1971
(52154) 2152 T-1	25 March 1971
(52155) 2236 T-1	25 March 1971
(52156) 4100 T-1	26 March 1971
(52157) 4126 T-1	26 March 1971
(52158) 4175 T-1	26 March 1971
(52159) 4178 T-1	26 March 1971
(52160) 4229 T-1	26 March 1971
(52161) 4302 T-1	26 March 1971
(52162) 4357 T-1	26 March 1971
(52163) 1004 T-2	29 September 1973
(52164) 1012 T-2	29 September 1973
(52165) 1099 T-2	29 September 1973
(52166) 1184 T-2	29 September 1973
(52167) 1220 T-2	29 September 1973
(52168) 1305 T-2	29 September 1973
(52169) 1494 T-2	29 September 1973
(52170) 2046 T-2	29 September 1973
(52171) 2127 T-2	29 September 1973
(52172) 2166 T-2	29 September 1973
(52173) 2178 T-2	29 September 1973

(52174) 2183 T-2	29 September 1973
(52175) 2204 T-2	29 September 1973
(52176) 2233 T-2	29 September 1973
(52177) 2235 T-2	29 September 1973
(52178) 2244 T-2	29 September 1973
(52179) 2270 T-2	29 September 1973
(52180) 2273 T-2	29 September 1973
(52181) 3112 T-2	30 September 1973
(52182) 3130 T-2	30 September 1973
(52183) 3286 T-2	30 September 1973
(52184) 3361 T-2	25 September 1973
(52185) 3370 T-2	25 September 1973
(52186) 4072 T-2	29 September 1973
(52187) 4125 T-2	29 September 1973
(52188) 4142 T-2	29 September 1973
(52189) 4215 T-2	29 September 1973
(52190) 4241 T-2	29 September 1973
(52191) 4263 T-2	29 September 1973
(52192) 5053 T-2	25 September 1973
(52193) 5209 T-2	25 September 1973
(52194) 1149 T-3	17 October 1977
(52195) 2061 T-3	16 October 1977
(52196) 2075 T-3	16 October 1977
(52197) 2373 T-3	16 October 1977
(52198) 2389 T-3	16 October 1977

(52199) 2465 T-3	16 October 1977
(52200) 3094 T-3	16 October 1977
(52201) 3098 T-3	16 October 1977
(52202) 3124 T-3	16 October 1977
(52203) 3160 T-3	16 October 1977
(52204) 3219 T-3	16 October 1977
(52205) 3247 T-3	16 October 1977
(52206) 3326 T-3	16 October 1977
(52207) 3403 T-3	16 October 1977
(52208) 3423 T-3	16 October 1977
(52209) 3495 T-3	16 October 1977
(52210) 4032 T-3	16 October 1977
(52211) 4049 T-3	16 October 1977
(52212) 4056 T-3	16 October 1977
(52213) 4181 T-3	16 October 1977
(52214) 4196 T-3	16 October 1977
(52215) 4213 T-3	16 October 1977
(52216) 5014 T-3	16 October 1977
(52217) 5035 T-3	16 October 1977
(52218) 5050 T-3	16 October 1977
(52219) 5071 T-3	16 October 1977
(52220) 5082 T-3	16 October 1977
(52221) 5103 T-3	16 October 1977
(52222) 5111 T-3	16 October 1977
(52223) 5158 T-3	16 October 1977

(52224) 5602 T-3	16 October 1977
(55639) 2070 P-L	24 September 1960
(55640) 2114 P-L	24 September 1960
(55641) 2125 P-L	24 September 1960
(55642) 2138 P-L	24 September 1960
(55643) 2179 P-L	24 September 1960
(55644) 2582 P-L	24 September 1960
(55645) 2625 P-L	24 September 1960
(55646) 2637 P-L	24 September 1960
(55647) 2676 P-L	24 September 1960
(55648) 2786 P-L	26 September 1960
(55649) 3023 P-L	24 September 1960
(55650) 3536 P-L	17 October 1960
(55651) 4043 P-L	24 September 1960
(55652) 4048 P-L	24 September 1960
(55653) 4088 P-L	24 September 1960
(55654) 4093 P-L	24 September 1960
(55655) 4101 P-L	24 September 1960
(55656) 4708 P-L	24 September 1960
(55657) 4905 P-L	24 September 1960
(55658) 6061 P-L	24 September 1960
(55659) 6110 P-L	24 September 1960
(55660) 6119 P-L	24 September 1960
(55661) 6184 P-L	24 September 1960
(55662) 6224 P-L	24 September 1960

(55663) 6247 P-L	24 September 1960
(55664) 6281 P-L	24 September 1960
(55665) 6527 P-L	24 September 1960
(55666) 6631 P-L	24 September 1960
(55667) 6691 P-L	24 September 1960
(55668) 6722 P-L	24 September 1960
(55669) 6810 P-L	24 September 1960
(55670) 9581 P-L	17 October 1960
(55671) 9587 P-L	17 October 1960
(55672) 1049 T-1	25 March 1971
(55673) 1150 T-1	25 March 1971
(55674) 2112 T-1	25 March 1971
(55675) 2316 T-1	25 March 1971
55676 Klythios	26 March 1971
(55677) 3201 T-1	26 March 1971
55678 Lampos	26 March 1971
(55679) 4230 T-1	26 March 1971
(55680) 4289 T-1	26 March 1971
(55681) 1143 T-2	29 September 1973
(55682) 1303 T-2	29 September 1973
(55683) 1361 T-2	29 September 1973
(55684) 1510 T-2	30 September 1973
(55685) 2030 T-2	29 September 1973
(55686) 2041 T-2	29 September 1973
(55687) 2049 T-2	29 September 1973

(55688) 2053 T-2	29 September 1973
(55689) 2237 T-2	29 September 1973
(55690) 2696 T-2	29 September 1973
(55691) 3028 T-2	30 September 1973
(55692) 3118 T-2	30 September 1973
(55693) 4149 T-2	29 September 1973
(55694) 4199 T-2	29 September 1973
(55695) 4225 T-2	29 September 1973
(55696) 4227 T-2	29 September 1973
(55697) 4233 T-2	29 September 1973
(55698) 4301 T-2	29 September 1973
(55699) 5396 T-2	30 September 1973
(55700) 1092 T-3	17 October 1977
55701 Ukalegon	17 October 1977
55702 Thymoitos	17 October 1977
(55703) 2032 T-3	16 October 1977
(55704) 2165 T-3	16 October 1977
(55705) 2190 T-3	16 October 1977
(55706) 2241 T-3	16 October 1977
(55707) 2246 T-3	16 October 1977
(55708) 2288 T-3	16 October 1977
(55709) 2434 T-3	16 October 1977
(55710) 3081 T-3	16 October 1977
(55711) 3122 T-3	16 October 1977
(55712) 3174 T-3	16 October 1977

(55713) 3463 T-3	16 October 1977
(55714) 3491 T-3	16 October 1977
(55715) 3536 T-3	16 October 1977
(55716) 4249 T-3	16 October 1977
(55717) 5027 T-3	16 October 1977
(55718) 5096 T-3	16 October 1977
(55719) 5131 T-3	16 October 1977
(58058) 2118 P-L	24 September 1960
(58059) 2690 P-L	24 September 1960
(58060) 2751 P-L	24 September 1960
(58061) 2769 P-L	24 September 1960
(58062) 4034 P-L	24 September 1960
(58063) 6024 P-L	24 September 1960
(58064) 6220 P-L	24 September 1960
(58065) 6814 P-L	24 September 1960
(58066) 7579 P-L	17 October 1960
(58067) 2269 T-1	25 March 1971
(58068) 3143 T-1	26 March 1971
(58069) 4310 T-1	26 March 1971
(58070) 1034 T-2	29 September 1973
(58071) 1308 T-2	29 September 1973
(58072) 1476 T-2	30 September 1973
(58073) 1514 T-2	29 September 1973
(58074) 1612 T-2	24 September 1973
(58075) 2205 T-2	29 September 1973

(58076) 2208 T-2	29 September 1973
(58077) 2209 T-2	29 September 1973
(58078) 3003 T-2	30 September 1973
(58079) 3244 T-2	30 September 1973
(58080) 4228 T-2	29 September 1973
(58081) 4817 T-2	25 September 1973
(58082) 5072 T-2	25 September 1973
(58083) 5459 T-2	30 September 1973
58084 Hiketaon	17 October 1977
(58085) 1199 T-3	17 October 1977
(58086) 2017 T-3	16 October 1977
(58087) 2156 T-3	16 October 1977
(58088) 2256 T-3	16 October 1977
(58089) 2352 T-3	16 October 1977
(58090) 3452 T-3	16 October 1977
(58091) 3768 T-3	16 October 1977
(58092) 4053 T-3	16 October 1977
58095 Oranienstein	19 September 1973
58096 Oineus	29 September 1973
(65490) 2062 P-L	24 September 1960
(65491) 2084 P-L	24 September 1960
(65492) 2104 P-L	24 September 1960
(65493) 2119 P-L	24 September 1960
(65494) 2123 P-L	24 September 1960
(65495) 2200 P-L	24 September 1960

(65496) 2211 P-L	24 September 1960
(65497) 2606 P-L	24 September 1960
(65498) 2647 P-L	24 September 1960
(65499) 2650 P-L	24 September 1960
(65500) 2759 P-L	24 September 1960
(65501) 2766 P-L	24 September 1960
(65502) 2856 P-L	24 September 1960
(65503) 3028 P-L	24 September 1960
(65504) 3544 P-L	17 October 1960
(65505) 4085 P-L	24 September 1960
(65506) 4102 P-L	24 September 1960
(65507) 4151 P-L	24 September 1960
(65508) 4179 P-L	24 September 1960
(65509) 4186 P-L	24 September 1960
(65510) 4241 P-L	24 September 1960
(65511) 4243 P-L	24 September 1960
(65512) 4246 P-L	24 September 1960
(65513) 4258 P-L	24 September 1960
(65514) 4270 P-L	24 September 1960
(65515) 4712 P-L	24 September 1960
(65516) 4726 P-L	24 September 1960
(65517) 4759 P-L	24 September 1960
(65518) 4838 P-L	24 September 1960
(65519) 4853 P-L	24 September 1960
(65520) 4857 P-L	24 September 1960

(65521) 4894 P-L	24 September 1960
(65522) 5570 P-L	22 October 1960
(65523) 5578 P-L	24 September 1960
(65524) 5585 P-L	22 October 1960
(65525) 6052 P-L	24 September 1960
(65526) 6075 P-L	24 September 1960
(65527) 6099 P-L	24 September 1960
(65528) 6118 P-L	24 September 1960
(65529) 6200 P-L	24 September 1960
(65530) 6216 P-L	24 September 1960
(65531) 6296 P-L	24 September 1960
(65532) 6389 P-L	24 September 1960
(65533) 6592 P-L	24 September 1960
(65534) 6711 P-L	24 September 1960
(65535) 6773 P-L	24 September 1960
(65536) 6826 P-L	24 September 1960
(65537) 6855 P-L	24 September 1960
(65538) 7561 P-L	17 October 1960
(65539) 7562 P-L	17 October 1960
(65540) 7628 P-L	17 October 1960
65541 Kasbek	17 October 1960
(65542) 1143 T-1	25 March 1971
(65543) 1223 T-1	25 March 1971
(65544) 2233 T-1	25 March 1971
(65545) 2235 T-1	25 March 1971

(65546) 3256 T-1	26 March 1971
(65547) 3337 T-1	26 March 1971
(65548) 4311 T-1	26 March 1971
(65549) 4869 T-1	13 May 1971
(65550) 1062 T-2	29 September 1973
(65551) 1206 T-2	29 September 1973
(65552) 1261 T-2	29 September 1973
(65553) 1297 T-2	29 September 1973
(65554) 1350 T-2	29 September 1973
(65555) 1464 T-2	29 September 1973
(65556) 1541 T-2	29 September 1973
(65557) 1606 T-2	24 September 1973
(65558) 1611 T-2	24 September 1973
(65559) 2065 T-2	29 September 1973
(65560) 2175 T-2	29 September 1973
(65561) 2195 T-2	29 September 1973
(65562) 2219 T-2	29 September 1973
(65563) 2238 T-2	29 September 1973
(65564) 2264 T-2	29 September 1973
(65565) 2300 T-2	29 September 1973
(65566) 3022 T-2	30 September 1973
(65567) 3039 T-2	30 September 1973
(65568) 3105 T-2	30 September 1973
(65569) 3127 T-2	30 September 1973
(65570) 3139 T-2	30 September 1973

(65571) 3165 T-2	30 September 1973
(65572) 3173 T-2	30 September 1973
(65573) 3203 T-2	30 September 1973
(65574) 3229 T-2	30 September 1973
(65575) 3245 T-2	30 September 1973
(65576) 3277 T-2	30 September 1973
(65577) 3324 T-2	25 September 1973
(65578) 4137 T-2	29 September 1973
(65579) 4173 T-2	29 September 1973
(65580) 4181 T-2	29 September 1973
(65581) 4275 T-2	29 September 1973
(65582) 4362 T-2	30 September 1973
65583 Theoklymenos	30 September 1973
(65584) 5051 T-2	25 September 1973
(65585) 5064 T-2	25 September 1973
(65586) 5160 T-2	25 September 1973
(65587) 1033 T-3	17 October 1977
(65588) 1086 T-3	17 October 1977
(65589) 1122 T-3	17 October 1977
65590 Archeptolemos	17 October 1977
(65591) 2147 T-3	16 October 1977
(65592) 2155 T-3	16 October 1977
(65593) 2375 T-3	16 October 1977
(65594) 2396 T-3	16 October 1977
(65595) 2430 T-3	16 October 1977

(65596) 3033 T-3	16 October 1977
(65597) 3047 T-3	16 October 1977
(65598) 3059 T-3	16 October 1977
(65599) 3079 T-3	16 October 1977
(65600) 3121 T-3	16 October 1977
(65601) 3159 T-3	16 October 1977
(65602) 3192 T-3	16 October 1977
(65603) 3229 T-3	16 October 1977
(65604) 3235 T-3	16 October 1977
(65605) 3245 T-3	16 October 1977
(65606) 3315 T-3	16 October 1977
(65607) 3360 T-3	16 October 1977
(65608) 3441 T-3	16 October 1977
(65609) 3445 T-3	16 October 1977
(65610) 3470 T-3	16 October 1977
(65611) 3498 T-3	16 October 1977
(65612) 3564 T-3	16 October 1977
(65613) 3923 T-3	16 October 1977
(65614) 4096 T-3	16 October 1977
(65615) 4163 T-3	16 October 1977
(65616) 4165 T-3	16 October 1977
(65617) 4172 T-3	16 October 1977
(65618) 4217 T-3	16 October 1977
(65619) 4218 T-3	16 October 1977
(65620) 4238 T-3	16 October 1977

(65621) 4247 T-3	16 October 1977
(65622) 4287 T-3	16 October 1977
(65623) 4297 T-3	16 October 1977
(65624) 4347 T-3	16 October 1977
(65625) 4377 T-3	16 October 1977
(65626) 5052 T-3	16 October 1977
(65627) 5090 T-3	16 October 1977
(65628) 5098 T-3	16 October 1977
(65629) 5118 T-3	16 October 1977
(65630) 5134 T-3	16 October 1977
(65631) 5143 T-3	16 October 1977
(65632) 5177 T-3	16 October 1977
(65633) 5291 T-3	17 October 1977
(65634) 5644 T-3	16 October 1977
(69160) 2029 P-L	24 September 1960
(69161) 2203 P-L	24 September 1960
(69162) 2736 P-L	24 September 1960
(69163) 2744 P-L	24 September 1960
(69164) 3031 P-L	24 September 1960
(69165) 3044 P-L	24 September 1960
(69166) 3075 P-L	24 September 1960
(69167) 3082 P-L	24 September 1960
(69168) 3515 P-L	17 October 1960
(69169) 4066 P-L	24 September 1960
(69170) 4199 P-L	24 September 1960

(69171) 4230 P-L	24 September 1960
(69172) 4283 P-L	24 September 1960
(69173) 4304 P-L	24 September 1960
(69174) 4514 P-L	24 September 1960
(69175) 4550 P-L	24 September 1960
(69176) 4602 P-L	24 September 1960
(69177) 4618 P-L	24 September 1960
(69178) 4729 P-L	24 September 1960
(69179) 4756 P-L	24 September 1960
(69180) 4770 P-L	24 September 1960
(69181) 4821 P-L	24 September 1960
(69182) 4850 P-L	24 September 1960
(69183) 6638 P-L	24 September 1960
(69184) 6705 P-L	24 September 1960
(69185) 6739 P-L	24 September 1960
(69186) 6783 P-L	24 September 1960
(69187) 1178 T-1	25 March 1971
(69188) 1258 T-1	25 March 1971
(69189) 1263 T-1	25 March 1971
(69190) 2027 T-1	25 March 1971
(69191) 2143 T-1	25 March 1971
(69192) 3172 T-1	26 March 1971
(69193) 3326 T-1	26 March 1971
(69194) 1118 T-2	29 September 1973
(69195) 1164 T-2	29 September 1973

(69196) 1216 T-2	29 September 1973
(69197) 1238 T-2	29 September 1973
(69198) 1255 T-2	29 September 1973
(69199) 1278 T-2	29 September 1973
(69200) 1300 T-2	29 September 1973
(69201) 1323 T-2	29 September 1973
(69202) 2026 T-2	29 September 1973
(69203) 2088 T-2	29 September 1973
(69204) 2139 T-2	29 September 1973
(69205) 2156 T-2	29 September 1973
(69206) 2167 T-2	29 September 1973
(69207) 3004 T-2	30 September 1973
(69208) 3078 T-2	30 September 1973
(69209) 3300 T-2	30 September 1973
(69210) 3356 T-2	25 September 1973
(69211) 4098 T-2	29 September 1973
(69212) 4287 T-2	29 September 1973
(69213) 4616 T-2	30 September 1973
(69214) 5067 T-2	25 September 1973
(69215) 5099 T-2	25 September 1973
(69216) 1108 T-3	17 October 1977
(69217) 2135 T-3	16 October 1977
(69218) 2330 T-3	16 October 1977
(69219) 2364 T-3	16 October 1977
(69220) 3030 T-3	16 October 1977

(69221) 3528 T-3	16 October 1977
(69222) 4210 T-3	16 October 1977
(69223) 4331 T-3	16 October 1977
(69224) 4388 T-3	16 October 1977
(69225) 5043 T-3	16 October 1977
(69226) 5129 T-3	16 October 1977
(69227) 5139 T-3	16 October 1977
69228 Kamerunberg	16 October 1977
(69229) 5188 T-3	16 October 1977
(73554) 2124 P-L	24 September 1960
(73555) 2129 P-L	24 September 1960
(73556) 2130 P-L	24 September 1960
(73557) 2131 P-L	24 September 1960
(73558) 2567 P-L	24 September 1960
(73559) 2665 P-L	24 September 1960
(73560) 2737 P-L	24 September 1960
(73561) 2803 P-L	24 September 1960
(73562) 2810 P-L	24 September 1960
(73563) 3009 P-L	24 September 1960
(73564) 4051 P-L	24 September 1960
(73565) 4252 P-L	24 September 1960
(73566) 4259 P-L	24 September 1960
(73567) 4509 P-L	24 September 1960
(73568) 4656 P-L	24 September 1960
(73569) 4659 P-L	24 September 1960

(73570) 4736 P-L	24 September 1960
(73571) 4755 P-L	24 September 1960
(73572) 4765 P-L	24 September 1960
(73573) 4766 P-L	24 September 1960
(73574) 4783 P-L	24 September 1960
(73575) 4789 P-L	24 September 1960
(73576) 4812 P-L	24 September 1960
(73577) 4818 P-L	24 September 1960
(73578) 6277 P-L	24 September 1960
(73579) 6284 P-L	24 September 1960
(73580) 6285 P-L	24 September 1960
(73581) 6772 P-L	24 September 1960
(73582) 2249 T-1	25 March 1971
(73583) 3092 T-1	26 March 1971
(73584) 3228 T-1	26 March 1971
(73585) 3339 T-1	26 March 1971
(73586) 4141 T-1	26 March 1971
(73587) 1020 T-2	29 September 1973
(73588) 1067 T-2	29 September 1973
(73589) 1114 T-2	29 September 1973
(73590) 1258 T-2	29 September 1973
(73591) 1359 T-2	30 September 1973
(73592) 1401 T-2	29 September 1973
(73593) 1806 T-2	24 September 1973
(73594) 2014 T-2	29 September 1973

(73595) 2129 T-2	29 September 1973
(73596) 2147 T-2	29 September 1973
(73597) 2188 T-2	29 September 1973
(73598) 2912 T-2	30 September 1973
(73599) 3012 T-2	30 September 1973
(73600) 3020 T-2	30 September 1973
(73601) 3045 T-2	30 September 1973
(73602) 3053 T-2	30 September 1973
(73603) 3214 T-2	30 September 1973
(73604) 4039 T-2	29 September 1973
(73605) 4041 T-2	29 September 1973
(73606) 4079 T-2	29 September 1973
(73607) 4092 T-2	29 September 1973
(73608) 4155 T-2	29 September 1973
(73609) 5114 T-2	25 September 1973
73610 Klyuchevskaya	17 October 1977
(73611) 2127 T-3	16 October 1977
(73612) 2178 T-3	16 October 1977
(73613) 2213 T-3	16 October 1977
(73614) 2229 T-3	16 October 1977
(73615) 2353 T-3	16 October 1977
(73616) 2383 T-3	16 October 1977
(73617) 2437 T-3	16 October 1977
(73618) 2458 T-3	16 October 1977
(73619) 3322 T-3	16 October 1977

(73620) 3346 T-3	16 October 1977
(73621) 3381 T-3	16 October 1977
(73622) 3418 T-3	16 October 1977
(73623) 3477 T-3	16 October 1977
(73624) 3481 T-3	16 October 1977
(73625) 3524 T-3	16 October 1977
(73626) 3939 T-3	16 October 1977
(73627) 4040 T-3	16 October 1977
(73628) 4170 T-3	16 October 1977
(73629) 4303 T-3	16 October 1977
(73630) 4352 T-3	16 October 1977
(73631) 4367 T-3	16 October 1977
(73632) 4432 T-3	11 October 1977
(73633) 4702 T-3	16 October 1977
(73634) 5077 T-3	16 October 1977
(73635) 5105 T-3	16 October 1977
(73636) 5727 T-3	16 October 1977
73637 Guneus	19 September 1973
(78995) 2047 P-L	24 September 1960
(78996) 2080 P-L	24 September 1960
(78997) 2121 P-L	24 September 1960
(78998) 2504 P-L	24 September 1960
(78999) 2614 P-L	24 September 1960
(79000) 2689 P-L	24 September 1960
(79001) 2749 P-L	24 September 1960

(79002) 2774 P-L	24 September 1960
(79003) 3519 P-L	17 October 1960
(79004) 4134 P-L	24 September 1960
(79005) 4220 P-L	24 September 1960
(79006) 4261 P-L	24 September 1960
(79007) 4289 P-L	24 September 1960
(79008) 4306 P-L	24 September 1960
(79009) 4707 P-L	24 September 1960
(79010) 4851 P-L	24 September 1960
(79011) 6312 P-L	24 September 1960
(79012) 6678 P-L	24 September 1960
(79013) 9056 P-L	17 October 1960
(79014) 9520 P-L	17 October 1960
(79015) 9548 P-L	17 October 1960
(79016) 2094 T-1	25 March 1971
(79017) 2117 T-1	25 March 1971
(79018) 2126 T-1	25 March 1971
(79019) 1071 T-2	29 September 1973
(79020) 1085 T-2	29 September 1973
(79021) 1160 T-2	29 September 1973
(79022) 1200 T-2	29 September 1973
(79023) 1213 T-2	29 September 1973
(79024) 1247 T-2	29 September 1973
(79025) 1318 T-2	29 September 1973
(79026) 1322 T-2	29 September 1973

(79027) 1337 T-2	29 September 1973
(79028) 1441 T-2	29 September 1973
(79029) 1503 T-2	29 September 1973
(79030) 2027 T-2	29 September 1973
(79031) 2073 T-2	29 September 1973
(79032) 2134 T-2	29 September 1973
(79033) 2185 T-2	29 September 1973
(79034) 2228 T-2	29 September 1973
(79035) 2247 T-2	29 September 1973
(79036) 3063 T-2	30 September 1973
(79037) 3116 T-2	30 September 1973
(79038) 3144 T-2	30 September 1973
(79039) 3169 T-2	30 September 1973
(79040) 3196 T-2	30 September 1973
(79041) 3234 T-2	30 September 1973
(79042) 3249 T-2	30 September 1973
(79043) 3330 T-2	25 September 1973
(79044) 3919 T-2	30 September 1973
(79045) 4071 T-2	29 September 1973
(79046) 4113 T-2	29 September 1973
(79047) 4184 T-2	29 September 1973
(79048) 4200 T-2	29 September 1973
(79049) 4207 T-2	29 September 1973
(79050) 4649 T-2	30 September 1973
(79051) 5091 T-2	25 September 1973

(79052) 5142 T-2	25 September 1973
(79053) 5153 T-2	25 September 1973
(79054) 1046 T-3	17 October 1977
(79055) 1063 T-3	17 October 1977
(79056) 1132 T-3	17 October 1977
(79057) 1183 T-3	17 October 1977
(79058) 1215 T-3	17 October 1977
(79059) 2014 T-3	16 October 1977
(79060) 2281 T-3	16 October 1977
(79061) 2286 T-3	16 October 1977
(79062) 2449 T-3	16 October 1977
(79063) 2499 T-3	16 October 1977
(79064) 2536 T-3	17 October 1977
(79065) 3102 T-3	16 October 1977
(79066) 3172 T-3	16 October 1977
(79067) 3221 T-3	16 October 1977
(79068) 3258 T-3	16 October 1977
(79069) 3275 T-3	16 October 1977
(79070) 3282 T-3	16 October 1977
(79071) 3300 T-3	16 October 1977
(79072) 3337 T-3	16 October 1977
(79073) 3410 T-3	16 October 1977
(79074) 3530 T-3	16 October 1977
(79075) 3704 T-3	16 October 1977
(79076) 3782 T-3	16 October 1977

(79077) 4122 T-3	16 October 1977
(79078) 4188 T-3	16 October 1977
(79079) 4302 T-3	16 October 1977
(79080) 4502 T-3	16 October 1977
(79081) 4673 T-3	17 October 1977
(79082) 5047 T-3	16 October 1977
(79083) 5068 T-3	16 October 1977
(79084) 5650 T-3	16 October 1977
(85019) 2039 P-L	24 September 1960
(85020) 2057 P-L	24 September 1960
(85021) 2067 P-L	24 September 1960
(85022) 2068 P-L	24 September 1960
(85023) 2087 P-L	24 September 1960
(85024) 2224 P-L	24 September 1960
(85025) 2544 P-L	24 September 1960
(85026) 2653 P-L	24 September 1960
(85027) 2677 P-L	24 September 1960
(85028) 2729 P-L	24 September 1960
(85029) 2755 P-L	24 September 1960
85030 Admetos	24 September 1960
(85031) 2860 P-L	24 September 1960
(85032) 3054 P-L	24 September 1960
(85033) 3073 P-L	24 September 1960
(85034) 3542 P-L	17 October 1960
(85035) 4149 P-L	24 September 1960

(85036) 4203 P-L	24 September 1960
(85037) 4279 P-L	24 September 1960
(85038) 4313 P-L	24 September 1960
(85039) 4541 P-L	24 September 1960
(85040) 4617 P-L	24 September 1960
(85041) 4653 P-L	24 September 1960
(85042) 4779 P-L	24 September 1960
(85043) 4817 P-L	24 September 1960
(85044) 4829 P-L	24 September 1960
(85045) 5015 P-L	22 October 1960
(85046) 6126 P-L	24 September 1960
85047 Krakatau	24 September 1960
(85048) 6265 P-L	24 September 1960
(85049) 6279 P-L	24 September 1960
(85050) 6572 P-L	24 September 1960
(85051) 6641 P-L	24 September 1960
(85052) 6778 P-L	24 September 1960
(85053) 6789 P-L	24 September 1960
(85054) 6841 P-L	24 September 1960
(85055) 6872 P-L	24 September 1960
(85056) 9093 P-L	24 September 1960
(85057) 9608 P-L	17 October 1960
(85058) 1112 T-1	25 March 1971
(85059) 1211 T-1	25 March 1971
(85060) 2080 T-1	25 March 1971

(85061) 2137 T-1	25 March 1971
(85062) 2272 T-1	25 March 1971
(85063) 3148 T-1	26 March 1971
(85064) 3338 T-1	26 March 1971
(85065) 4053 T-1	26 March 1971
(85066) 4255 T-1	26 March 1971
(85067) 4333 T-1	26 March 1971
(85068) 1021 T-2	29 September 1973
(85069) 1056 T-2	29 September 1973
(85070) 1120 T-2	30 September 1973
(85071) 1189 T-2	29 September 1973
(85072) 1245 T-2	29 September 1973
(85073) 1263 T-2	29 September 1973
(85074) 1288 T-2	29 September 1973
(85075) 1444 T-2	29 September 1973
(85076) 1451 T-2	30 September 1973
(85077) 1454 T-2	29 September 1973
(85078) 1509 T-2	29 September 1973
(85079) 2047 T-2	29 September 1973
(85080) 2070 T-2	29 September 1973
(85081) 2153 T-2	29 September 1973
(85082) 2158 T-2	29 September 1973
(85083) 2305 T-2	29 September 1973
(85084) 2309 T-2	29 September 1973
(85085) 3014 T-2	30 September 1973

(85086) 3059 T-2	30 September 1973
(85087) 3090 T-2	30 September 1973
(85088) 3202 T-2	30 September 1973
(85089) 3304 T-2	30 September 1973
(85090) 4028 T-2	29 September 1973
(85091) 4112 T-2	29 September 1973
(85092) 4253 T-2	29 September 1973
(85093) 5071 T-2	25 September 1973
(85094) 5119 T-2	25 September 1973
85095 Hekla	25 September 1973
(85096) 1044 T-3	17 October 1977
(85097) 1082 T-3	17 October 1977
(85098) 1208 T-3	17 October 1977
(85099) 1213 T-3	17 October 1977
(85100) 2189 T-3	16 October 1977
(85101) 2192 T-3	16 October 1977
(85102) 2211 T-3	16 October 1977
(85103) 2412 T-3	16 October 1977
(85104) 2415 T-3	16 October 1977
(85105) 2433 T-3	16 October 1977
(85106) 3038 T-3	16 October 1977
(85107) 3144 T-3	16 October 1977
(85108) 3475 T-3	16 October 1977
(85109) 3892 T-3	16 October 1977
(85110) 4043 T-3	16 October 1977

(85111) 4051 T-3	16 October 1977
(85112) 4060 T-3	16 October 1977
(85113) 4116 T-3	16 October 1977
(85114) 4285 T-3	16 October 1977
(85115) 4329 T-3	16 October 1977
(85116) 4342 T-3	16 October 1977
(85117) 5135 T-3	16 October 1977
(90584) 2030 P-L	24 September 1960
(90585) 2032 P-L	24 September 1960
(90586) 2035 P-L	24 September 1960
(90587) 2182 P-L	24 September 1960
(90588) 2209 P-L	24 September 1960
(90589) 2587 P-L	24 September 1960
(90590) 2624 P-L	24 September 1960
(90591) 2659 P-L	24 September 1960
(90592) 2801 P-L	24 September 1960
(90593) 3003 P-L	24 September 1960
(90594) 3563 P-L	17 October 1960
(90595) 4033 P-L	24 September 1960
(90596) 4229 P-L	24 September 1960
(90597) 4248 P-L	24 September 1960
(90598) 4253 P-L	24 September 1960
(90599) 4542 P-L	24 September 1960
(90600) 4560 P-L	24 September 1960
(90601) 4718 P-L	24 September 1960

(90602) 4757 P-L	24 September 1960
(90603) 4760 P-L	24 September 1960
(90604) 4813 P-L	24 September 1960
(90605) 4814 P-L	24 September 1960
(90606) 4879 P-L	26 September 1960
(90607) 4918 P-L	24 September 1960
(90608) 5020 P-L	17 October 1960
(90609) 5027 P-L	17 October 1960
(90610) 6098 P-L	24 September 1960
(90611) 6100 P-L	24 September 1960
(90612) 6132 P-L	24 September 1960
(90613) 6187 P-L	24 September 1960
(90614) 6646 P-L	26 September 1960
(90615) 6762 P-L	24 September 1960
(90616) 6835 P-L	24 September 1960
(90617) 9589 P-L	17 October 1960
(90618) 1072 T-1	25 March 1971
(90619) 1227 T-1	25 March 1971
(90620) 4342 T-1	26 March 1971
(90621) 1007 T-2	29 September 1973
(90622) 1155 T-2	29 September 1973
(90623) 1202 T-2	29 September 1973
(90624) 1270 T-2	29 September 1973
(90625) 1336 T-2	29 September 1973
(90626) 1483 T-2	29 September 1973

(90627) 2090 T-2	29 September 1973
(90628) 2135 T-2	29 September 1973
(90629) 2149 T-2	29 September 1973
(90630) 2159 T-2	29 September 1973
(90631) 2213 T-2	29 September 1973
(90632) 2259 T-2	29 September 1973
(90633) 3040 T-2	30 September 1973
(90634) 3046 T-2	30 September 1973
(90635) 3068 T-2	30 September 1973
(90636) 3250 T-2	30 September 1973
(90637) 3340 T-2	25 September 1973
(90638) 4048 T-2	29 September 1973
(90639) 4151 T-2	29 September 1973
(90640) 4500 T-2	30 September 1973
(90641) 4570 T-2	30 September 1973
(90642) 5093 T-2	25 September 1973
(90643) 5166 T-2	25 September 1973
(90644) 5483 T-2	30 September 1973
(90645) 1004 T-3	16 October 1977
(90646) 1008 T-3	17 October 1977
(90647) 1016 T-3	17 October 1977
(90648) 1030 T-3	17 October 1977
(90649) 1041 T-3	17 October 1977
(90650) 1112 T-3	17 October 1977
(90651) 1219 T-3	17 October 1977

(90652) 1224 T-3	17 October 1977
(90653) 1904 T-3	17 October 1977
(90654) 2067 T-3	16 October 1977
(90655) 2144 T-3	16 October 1977
(90656) 2399 T-3	16 October 1977
(90657) 2414 T-3	16 October 1977
(90658) 2455 T-3	16 October 1977
(90659) 3175 T-3	16 October 1977
(90660) 3314 T-3	16 October 1977
(90661) 3853 T-3	16 October 1977
(90662) 4087 T-3	16 October 1977
(90663) 4257 T-3	16 October 1977
(90664) 4283 T-3	16 October 1977
(90665) 4299 T-3	16 October 1977
(90666) 4374 T-3	16 October 1977
(90667) 5011 T-3	16 October 1977
(90668) 5075 T-3	16 October 1977
(90669) 5181 T-3	16 October 1977
(90670) 5183 T-3	16 October 1977
(90671) 5728 T-3	16 October 1977
(96051) 2115 P-L	24 September 1960
(96052) 2134 P-L	24 September 1960
(96053) 2156 P-L	24 September 1960
(96054) 2189 P-L	24 September 1960
(96055) 2596 P-L	24 September 1960

(96056) 2704 P-L	24 September 1960
(96057) 2711 P-L	24 September 1960
(96058) 2831 P-L	24 September 1960
(96059) 3030 P-L	24 September 1960
(96060) 3103 P-L	24 September 1960
(96061) 4222 P-L	24 September 1960
(96062) 4558 P-L	24 September 1960
(96063) 4627 P-L	24 September 1960
(96064) 4772 P-L	24 September 1960
(96065) 4785 P-L	24 September 1960
(96066) 4799 P-L	24 September 1960
(96067) 4810 P-L	24 September 1960
(96068) 4819 P-L	24 September 1960
(96069) 6060 P-L	24 September 1960
(96070) 6078 P-L	24 September 1960
(96071) 6127 P-L	25 September 1960
(96072) 6222 P-L	24 September 1960
(96073) 6677 P-L	24 September 1960
(96074) 6709 P-L	24 September 1960
(96075) 6736 P-L	24 September 1960
(96076) 6825 P-L	26 September 1960
(96077) 6840 P-L	24 September 1960
(96078) 6857 P-L	24 September 1960
(96079) 7583 P-L	22 October 1960
(96080) 7649 P-L	27 September 1960

(96081) 9079 P-L	17 October 1960
(96082) 9606 P-L	24 September 1960
(96083) 1242 T-1	25 March 1971
(96084) 2225 T-1	25 March 1971
(96085) 2256 T-1	25 March 1971
96086 Toscanos	29 September 1973
(96087) 1035 T-2	29 September 1973
(96088) 1074 T-2	29 September 1973
(96089) 1127 T-2	29 September 1973
(96090) 1185 T-2	29 September 1973
(96091) 1267 T-2	30 September 1973
(96092) 2036 T-2	29 September 1973
(96093) 2063 T-2	29 September 1973
(96094) 2089 T-2	29 September 1973
(96095) 2095 T-2	29 September 1973
(96096) 2111 T-2	29 September 1973
(96097) 2122 T-2	29 September 1973
(96098) 2143 T-2	29 September 1973
(96099) 2193 T-2	29 September 1973
(96100) 2263 T-2	29 September 1973
(96101) 3006 T-2	30 September 1973
(96102) 3054 T-2	30 September 1973
(96103) 3132 T-2	30 September 1973
(96104) 3189 T-2	30 September 1973
(96105) 3225 T-2	30 September 1973

(96106) 3313 T-2	25 September 1973
(96107) 4109 T-2	29 September 1973
(96108) 4167 T-2	29 September 1973
(96109) 4192 T-2	29 September 1973
(96110) 4224 T-2	29 September 1973
(96111) 4243 T-2	29 September 1973
(96112) 5063 T-2	25 September 1973
(96113) 5083 T-2	25 September 1973
(96114) 5088 T-2	25 September 1973
(96115) 5139 T-2	25 September 1973
(96116) 5412 T-2	30 September 1973
(96117) 5458 T-2	30 September 1973
(96118) 1087 T-3	17 October 1977
(96119) 1091 T-3	17 October 1977
(96120) 1114 T-3	17 October 1977
(96121) 1127 T-3	17 October 1977
(96122) 1141 T-3	17 October 1977
(96123) 1184 T-3	17 October 1977
(96124) 2058 T-3	16 October 1977
(96125) 2152 T-3	16 October 1977
(96126) 2174 T-3	16 October 1977
(96127) 2202 T-3	16 October 1977
(96128) 2220 T-3	17 October 1977
(96129) 2248 T-3	16 October 1977
(96130) 2269 T-3	16 October 1977

(96131) 2276 T-3	16 October 1977
(96132) 2354 T-3	16 October 1977
(96133) 2488 T-3	16 October 1977
(96134) 3027 T-3	16 October 1977
(96135) 3054 T-3	16 October 1977
(96136) 3209 T-3	16 October 1977
(96137) 3252 T-3	16 October 1977
(96138) 3277 T-3	16 October 1977
(96139) 3324 T-3	16 October 1977
(96140) 3339 T-3	16 October 1977
(96141) 3359 T-3	16 October 1977
(96142) 3425 T-3	16 October 1977
(96143) 3434 T-3	16 October 1977
(96144) 3466 T-3	16 October 1977
(96145) 3808 T-3	16 October 1977
(96146) 3834 T-3	16 October 1977
(96147) 3851 T-3	16 October 1977
(96148) 3991 T-3	16 October 1977
(96149) 4125 T-3	16 October 1977
(96150) 4158 T-3	16 October 1977
(96151) 4239 T-3	16 October 1977
(96152) 4358 T-3	16 October 1977
(96153) 4651 T-3	16 October 1977
(96154) 5121 T-3	16 October 1977
(99944) 2710 P-L	24 September 1960

(99945) 4589 P-L	24 September 1960
(99946) 4134 T-1	26 March 1971
(99947) 4220 T-2	29 September 1973
99950 Euchenor	19 September 1973
(117863) 2028 P-L	24 September 1960
(117864) 2069 P-L	24 September 1960
(117865) 2081 P-L	24 September 1960
(117866) 2105 P-L	24 September 1960
(117867) 2127 P-L	24 September 1960
(117868) 2147 P-L	24 September 1960
(117869) 2168 P-L	26 September 1960
(117870) 2174 P-L	24 September 1960
(117871) 2186 P-L	24 September 1960
(117872) 2210 P-L	24 September 1960
(117873) 2212 P-L	24 September 1960
117874 Picodelteide	26 September 1960
(117875) 2539 P-L	24 September 1960
(117876) 2586 P-L	24 September 1960
(117877) 2593 P-L	24 September 1960
(117878) 2602 P-L	24 September 1960
(117879) 2621 P-L	24 September 1960
(117880) 2651 P-L	24 September 1960
(117881) 2675 P-L	26 September 1960
(117882) 2680 P-L	24 September 1960
(117883) 2682 P-L	24 September 1960

(117884) 2684 P-L	24 September 1960
(117885) 2692 P-L	24 September 1960
(117886) 2694 P-L	24 September 1960
(117887) 2721 P-L	24 September 1960
(117888) 2735 P-L	24 September 1960
(117889) 2745 P-L	24 September 1960
(117890) 2748 P-L	24 September 1960
(117891) 2750 P-L	24 September 1960
(117892) 2753 P-L	24 September 1960
(117893) 2781 P-L	26 September 1960
(117894) 2791 P-L	26 September 1960
(117895) 2802 P-L	24 September 1960
(117896) 2815 P-L	24 September 1960
(117897) 2845 P-L	24 September 1960
(117898) 3029 P-L	24 September 1960
(117899) 3048 P-L	24 September 1960
(117900) 3053 P-L	24 September 1960
(117901) 3055 P-L	24 September 1960
(117902) 3058 P-L	25 September 1960
(117903) 3115 P-L	24 September 1960
(117904) 3504 P-L	17 October 1960
(117905) 3543 P-L	17 October 1960
(117906) 4046 P-L	24 September 1960
(117907) 4076 P-L	24 September 1960
(117908) 4104 P-L	24 September 1960

(117909) 4123 P-L	24 September 1960
(117910) 4130 P-L	24 September 1960
(117911) 4138 P-L	24 September 1960
(117912) 4171 P-L	24 September 1960
(117913) 4211 P-L	24 September 1960
(117914) 4225 P-L	24 September 1960
(117915) 4227 P-L	24 September 1960
(117916) 4271 P-L	24 September 1960
(117917) 4281 P-L	24 September 1960
(117918) 4320 P-L	24 September 1960
(117919) 4537 P-L	24 September 1960
(117920) 4546 P-L	24 September 1960
(117921) 4621 P-L	24 September 1960
(117922) 4622 P-L	24 September 1960
(117923) 4660 P-L	24 September 1960
(117924) 4699 P-L	24 September 1960
(117925) 4701 P-L	24 September 1960
(117926) 4703 P-L	24 September 1960
(117927) 4739 P-L	24 September 1960
(117928) 4741 P-L	24 September 1960
(117929) 4742 P-L	24 September 1960
(117930) 4747 P-L	24 September 1960
(117931) 4776 P-L	24 September 1960
(117932) 4781 P-L	24 September 1960
(117933) 4808 P-L	24 September 1960

(117934) 4809 P-L	24 September 1960
(117935) 4863 P-L	24 September 1960
(117936) 4899 P-L	24 September 1960
(117937) 5036 P-L	22 October 1960
(117938) 6101 P-L	24 September 1960
(117939) 6122 P-L	24 September 1960
(117940) 6191 P-L	24 September 1960
(117941) 6202 P-L	24 September 1960
(117942) 6210 P-L	24 September 1960
(117943) 6219 P-L	24 September 1960
(117944) 6257 P-L	24 September 1960
(117945) 6271 P-L	24 September 1960
(117946) 6276 P-L	24 September 1960
(117947) 6301 P-L	24 September 1960
(117948) 6315 P-L	24 September 1960
(117949) 6316 P-L	24 September 1960
(117950) 6337 P-L	24 September 1960
(117951) 6369 P-L	24 September 1960
(117952) 6376 P-L	24 September 1960
(117953) 6511 P-L	24 September 1960
(117954) 6686 P-L	24 September 1960
(117955) 6693 P-L	24 September 1960
(117956) 6695 P-L	24 September 1960
(117957) 6706 P-L	24 September 1960
(117958) 6732 P-L	24 September 1960

(117959) 6763 P-L	26 September 1960
(117960) 6784 P-L	24 September 1960
(117961) 6813 P-L	24 September 1960
(117962) 6854 P-L	24 September 1960
(117963) 7596 P-L	17 October 1960
(117964) 7619 P-L	17 October 1960
(117965) 9064 P-L	17 October 1960
(117966) 9524 P-L	17 October 1960
(117967) 9563 P-L	17 October 1960
(117968) 9564 P-L	17 October 1960
(117969) 9583 P-L	17 October 1960
(117970) 9590 P-L	24 September 1960
(117971) 9613 P-L	17 October 1960
(117972) 1055 T-1	25 March 1971
(117973) 1073 T-1	25 March 1971
(117974) 1077 T-1	25 March 1971
(117975) 1131 T-1	25 March 1971
(117976) 1158 T-1	25 March 1971
(117977) 1192 T-1	25 March 1971
(117978) 1215 T-1	25 March 1971
(117979) 1233 T-1	25 March 1971
(117980) 1256 T-1	25 March 1971
(117981) 2067 T-1	25 March 1971
(117982) 2134 T-1	25 March 1971
(117983) 2240 T-1	25 March 1971

(117984) 2283 T-1	25 March 1971
(117985) 3167 T-1	26 March 1971
(117986) 3176 T-1	26 March 1971
(117987) 4106 T-1	26 March 1971
(117988) 4300 T-1	26 March 1971
(117989) 4371 T-1	26 March 1971
(117990) 1014 T-2	29 September 1973
(117991) 1033 T-2	29 September 1973
(117992) 1039 T-2	29 September 1973
117993 Zambujal	29 September 1973
(117994) 1076 T-2	29 September 1973
(117995) 1086 T-2	29 September 1973
(117996) 1089 T-2	29 September 1973
117997 Irazu	29 September 1973
(117998) 1095 T-2	29 September 1973
(117999) 1113 T-2	29 September 1973
(118000) 1128 T-2	29 September 1973
(118001) 1147 T-2	29 September 1973
(118002) 1172 T-2	29 September 1973
(118003) 1190 T-2	29 September 1973
(118004) 1192 T-2	29 September 1973
(118005) 1214 T-2	30 September 1973
(118006) 1252 T-2	29 September 1973
(118007) 1256 T-2	29 September 1973
(118008) 1257 T-2	29 September 1973

(118009) 1271 T-2	29 September 1973
(118010) 1272 T-2	29 September 1973
(118011) 1289 T-2	29 September 1973
(118012) 1313 T-2	29 September 1973
(118013) 1338 T-2	29 September 1973
(118014) 1342 T-2	29 September 1973
(118015) 1430 T-2	30 September 1973
(118016) 1437 T-2	30 September 1973
(118017) 1448 T-2	30 September 1973
(118018) 1496 T-2	29 September 1973
(118019) 1504 T-2	30 September 1973
(118020) 1602 T-2	24 September 1973
(118021) 2035 T-2	29 September 1973
(118022) 2055 T-2	29 September 1973
(118023) 2103 T-2	29 September 1973
(118024) 2110 T-2	29 September 1973
(118025) 2121 T-2	29 September 1973
(118026) 2151 T-2	29 September 1973
(118027) 2161 T-2	29 September 1973
(118028) 2283 T-2	29 September 1973
(118029) 2295 T-2	29 September 1973
(118030) 2325 T-2	29 September 1973
(118031) 2330 T-2	30 September 1973
(118032) 2410 T-2	25 September 1973
(118033) 2904 T-2	30 September 1973

(118034) 3015 T-2	30 September 1973
(118035) 3031 T-2	30 September 1973
(118036) 3038 T-2	30 September 1973
(118037) 3041 T-2	30 September 1973
(118038) 3051 T-2	30 September 1973
(118039) 3075 T-2	30 September 1973
(118040) 3104 T-2	30 September 1973
(118041) 3179 T-2	30 September 1973
(118042) 3204 T-2	30 September 1973
(118043) 3220 T-2	30 September 1973
(118044) 3224 T-2	30 September 1973
(118045) 3258 T-2	30 September 1973
(118046) 3259 T-2	30 September 1973
(118047) 3306 T-2	30 September 1973
(118048) 3311 T-2	30 September 1973
(118049) 4066 T-2	29 September 1973
(118050) 4073 T-2	29 September 1973
(118051) 4102 T-2	29 September 1973
(118052) 4105 T-2	29 September 1973
(118053) 4106 T-2	29 September 1973
(118054) 4123 T-2	29 September 1973
(118055) 4124 T-2	29 September 1973
(118056) 4126 T-2	29 September 1973
(118057) 4163 T-2	29 September 1973
(118058) 4175 T-2	29 September 1973

(118059) 4206 T-2	29 September 1973
(118060) 4213 T-2	29 September 1973
(118061) 4249 T-2	29 September 1973
(118062) 4256 T-2	29 September 1973
(118063) 4259 T-2	29 September 1973
(118064) 4292 T-2	29 September 1973
(118065) 4302 T-2	29 September 1973
(118066) 4317 T-2	29 September 1973
(118067) 4648 T-2	30 September 1973
(118068) 5011 T-2	25 September 1973
(118069) 5022 T-2	25 September 1973
(118070) 5060 T-2	25 September 1973
(118071) 5062 T-2	25 September 1973
(118072) 5076 T-2	25 September 1973
(118073) 5077 T-2	25 September 1973
(118074) 5078 T-2	25 September 1973
(118075) 5082 T-2	25 September 1973
(118076) 5100 T-2	25 September 1973
(118077) 5165 T-2	25 September 1973
(118078) 5174 T-2	25 September 1973
(118079) 5189 T-2	25 September 1973
(118080) 5197 T-2	25 September 1973
(118081) 5206 T-2	25 September 1973
(118082) 5207 T-2	25 September 1973
(118083) 5215 T-2	25 September 1973

(118084) 5340 T-2	25 September 1973
(118085) 1019 T-3	17 October 1977
(118086) 1037 T-3	17 October 1977
(118087) 1043 T-3	17 October 1977
(118088) 1090 T-3	17 October 1977
(118089) 1093 T-3	17 October 1977
(118090) 1105 T-3	17 October 1977
(118091) 1124 T-3	17 October 1977
(118092) 1150 T-3	17 October 1977
(118093) 1163 T-3	17 October 1977
(118094) 1852 T-3	17 October 1977
(118095) 2007 T-3	16 October 1977
(118096) 2125 T-3	16 October 1977
(118097) 2148 T-3	16 October 1977
(118098) 2171 T-3	16 October 1977
(118099) 2210 T-3	16 October 1977
(118100) 2224 T-3	16 October 1977
(118101) 2228 T-3	16 October 1977
118102 Rinjani	16 October 1977
(118103) 2279 T-3	16 October 1977
(118104) 2294 T-3	16 October 1977
(118105) 2309 T-3	16 October 1977
(118106) 2343 T-3	16 October 1977
(118107) 2361 T-3	16 October 1977
(118108) 2398 T-3	16 October 1977

(118109) 2445 T-3	16 October 1977
(118110) 2493 T-3	16 October 1977
(118111) 2633 T-3	16 October 1977
(118112) 2665 T-3	11 October 1977
(118113) 3091 T-3	16 October 1977
(118114) 3117 T-3	16 October 1977
(118115) 3118 T-3	16 October 1977
(118116) 3161 T-3	16 October 1977
(118117) 3168 T-3	16 October 1977
(118118) 3169 T-3	16 October 1977
(118119) 3177 T-3	16 October 1977
(118120) 3181 T-3	16 October 1977
(118121) 3211 T-3	16 October 1977
(118122) 3228 T-3	16 October 1977
(118123) 3238 T-3	16 October 1977
(118124) 3253 T-3	16 October 1977
(118125) 3278 T-3	16 October 1977
(118126) 3344 T-3	16 October 1977
(118127) 3399 T-3	16 October 1977
(118128) 3457 T-3	16 October 1977
(118129) 3459 T-3	16 October 1977
(118130) 3469 T-3	16 October 1977
(118131) 3501 T-3	16 October 1977
(118132) 3505 T-3	16 October 1977
(118133) 3523 T-3	16 October 1977

(118134) 3533 T-3	16 October 1977
(118135) 3559 T-3	16 October 1977
(118136) 3756 T-3	16 October 1977
(118137) 3813 T-3	16 October 1977
(118138) 4036 T-3	16 October 1977
(118139) 4041 T-3	16 October 1977
(118140) 4042 T-3	16 October 1977
(118141) 4048 T-3	16 October 1977
(118142) 4117 T-3	16 October 1977
(118143) 4124 T-3	16 October 1977
(118144) 4136 T-3	16 October 1977
(118145) 4142 T-3	16 October 1977
(118146) 4161 T-3	16 October 1977
(118147) 4183 T-3	16 October 1977
(118148) 4204 T-3	16 October 1977
(118149) 4298 T-3	16 October 1977
(118150) 4325 T-3	16 October 1977
(118151) 4391 T-3	16 October 1977
(118152) 5076 T-3	16 October 1977
(118153) 5083 T-3	16 October 1977
(118154) 5110 T-3	16 October 1977
(118155) 5141 T-3	16 October 1977
(118156) 5146 T-3	16 October 1977
(118157) 5157 T-3	16 October 1977
(118158) 5161 T-3	16 October 1977

(118159) 5162 T-3	16 October 1977
(118160) 5646 T-3	16 October 1977
(118161) 5710 T-3	16 October 1977
(120409) 2178 P-L	24 September 1960
(120410) 2225 P-L	24 September 1960
(120411) 2857 P-L	24 September 1960
(120412) 3017 P-L	24 September 1960
(120413) 4815 P-L	24 September 1960
(120414) 4880 P-L	24 September 1960
(120415) 6057 P-L	24 September 1960
(120416) 6123 P-L	24 September 1960
(120417) 6264 P-L	24 September 1960
(120418) 6633 P-L	24 September 1960
(120419) 2308 T-1	25 March 1971
(120420) 4133 T-1	26 March 1971
(120421) 1604 T-2	24 September 1973
(120422) 2023 T-2	29 September 1973
(120423) 2061 T-2	29 September 1973
(120424) 2099 T-2	29 September 1973
(120425) 2113 T-2	29 September 1973
(120426) 3080 T-2	30 September 1973
(120427) 1155 T-3	17 October 1977
(120428) 2128 T-3	16 October 1977
(120429) 2225 T-3	16 October 1977
(120430) 2303 T-3	16 October 1977

(120431) 2448 T-3	16 October 1977
(120432) 2614 T-3	16 October 1977
(120433) 3132 T-3	16 October 1977
(120434) 3202 T-3	16 October 1977
(120435) 3310 T-3	16 October 1977
(120436) 4589 T-3	16 October 1977
(120437) 5101 T-3	16 October 1977
(129343) 2063 P-L	24 September 1960
(129344) 2094 P-L	24 September 1960
(129345) 2116 P-L	26 September 1960
(129346) 2222 P-L	24 September 1960
(129347) 2234 P-L	17 October 1960
(129348) 2513 P-L	24 September 1960
(129349) 2514 P-L	24 September 1960
(129350) 2515 P-L	24 September 1960
(129351) 2652 P-L	24 September 1960
(129352) 2664 P-L	24 September 1960
(129353) 2719 P-L	24 September 1960
(129354) 2747 P-L	24 September 1960
(129355) 3004 P-L	24 September 1960
(129356) 3067 P-L	25 September 1960
(129357) 3099 P-L	24 September 1960
(129358) 3105 P-L	24 September 1960
(129359) 4209 P-L	24 September 1960
(129360) 4263 P-L	24 September 1960

(129361) 4324 P-L	24 September 1960
(129362) 4327 P-L	24 September 1960
(129363) 4330 P-L	24 September 1960
(129364) 4719 P-L	24 September 1960
(129365) 4751 P-L	24 September 1960
(129366) 4752 P-L	24 September 1960
(129367) 4795 P-L	24 September 1960
(129368) 4823 P-L	24 September 1960
(129369) 4909 P-L	24 September 1960
(129370) 6258 P-L	24 September 1960
(129371) 6266 P-L	24 September 1960
(129372) 6291 P-L	24 September 1960
(129373) 6318 P-L	24 September 1960
(129374) 6340 P-L	24 September 1960
(129375) 6350 P-L	24 September 1960
(129376) 6357 P-L	24 September 1960
(129377) 6716 P-L	24 September 1960
(129378) 6729 P-L	24 September 1960
(129379) 6799 P-L	24 September 1960
(129380) 6839 P-L	24 September 1960
(129381) 6850 P-L	24 September 1960
(129382) 6852 P-L	24 September 1960
(129383) 7623 P-L	22 October 1960
(129384) 1218 T-1	25 March 1971
(129385) 4041 T-1	26 March 1971

(129386) 1027 T-2	29 September 1973
(129387) 1129 T-2	29 September 1973
(129388) 1149 T-2	29 September 1973
(129389) 1285 T-2	29 September 1973
(129390) 1291 T-2	29 September 1973
(129391) 1319 T-2	29 September 1973
(129392) 1339 T-2	29 September 1973
(129393) 1362 T-2	29 September 1973
(129394) 1402 T-2	29 September 1973
(129395) 1421 T-2	29 September 1973
(129396) 1424 T-2	29 September 1973
(129397) 1508 T-2	29 September 1973
(129398) 2109 T-2	29 September 1973
(129399) 2186 T-2	29 September 1973
(129400) 2321 T-2	29 September 1973
(129401) 3098 T-2	30 September 1973
(129402) 4093 T-2	29 September 1973
(129403) 4185 T-2	29 September 1973
(129404) 5021 T-2	25 September 1973
(129405) 5046 T-2	25 September 1973
(129406) 5092 T-2	25 September 1973
(129407) 5177 T-2	25 September 1973
(129408) 1045 T-3	17 October 1977
(129409) 2033 T-3	16 October 1977
(129410) 2150 T-3	16 October 1977

(129411) 2154 T-3	16 October 1977
(129412) 2160 T-3	16 October 1977
(129413) 2226 T-3	16 October 1977
(129414) 2231 T-3	16 October 1977
(129415) 2277 T-3	16 October 1977
(129416) 2291 T-3	16 October 1977
(129417) 2613 T-3	16 October 1977
(129418) 2617 T-3	16 October 1977
(129419) 2619 T-3	16 October 1977
(129420) 3114 T-3	16 October 1977
(129421) 3147 T-3	16 October 1977
(129422) 3223 T-3	16 October 1977
(129423) 3379 T-3	16 October 1977
(129424) 3415 T-3	16 October 1977
(129425) 3497 T-3	16 October 1977
(129426) 3516 T-3	16 October 1977
(129427) 4123 T-3	16 October 1977
(129428) 4164 T-3	16 October 1977
(129429) 4289 T-3	16 October 1977
(129430) 4305 T-3	16 October 1977
(129431) 4355 T-3	16 October 1977
(129432) 4506 T-3	16 October 1977
(129433) 4608 T-3	16 October 1977
(129434) 5013 T-3	16 October 1977
(129435) 5017 T-3	16 October 1977

(129436) 5039 T-3	16 October 1977
(134300) 2109 P-L	24 September 1960
(134301) 2141 P-L	24 September 1960
(134302) 2634 P-L	24 September 1960
(134303) 2701 P-L	24 September 1960
(134304) 2716 P-L	24 September 1960
(134305) 2738 P-L	24 September 1960
(134306) 2807 P-L	24 September 1960
(134307) 2849 P-L	24 September 1960
(134308) 4183 P-L	24 September 1960
(134309) 4552 P-L	24 September 1960
(134310) 4698 P-L	24 September 1960
(134311) 4704 P-L	24 September 1960
(134312) 4797 P-L	24 September 1960
(134313) 4816 P-L	24 September 1960
(134314) 6362 P-L	24 September 1960
(134315) 7501 P-L	17 October 1960
(134316) 9579 P-L	17 October 1960
(134317) 4117 T-1	26 March 1971
(134318) 1141 T-2	29 September 1973
(134319) 1205 T-2	29 September 1973
(134320) 1292 T-2	29 September 1973
(134321) 1316 T-2	29 September 1973
(134322) 1471 T-2	29 September 1973
(134323) 1564 T-2	24 September 1973

(134324) 1619 T-2	24 September 1973
(134325) 4492 T-2	30 September 1973
(134326) 2251 T-3	16 October 1977
(134327) 2304 T-3	16 October 1977
(134328) 2371 T-3	16 October 1977
134329 Cycnos	16 October 1977
(134330) 3055 T-3	16 October 1977
(134331) 3139 T-3	16 October 1977
(134332) 3323 T-3	16 October 1977
(134333) 3345 T-3	16 October 1977
(134334) 3391 T-3	16 October 1977
(134335) 4112 T-3	16 October 1977
(134336) 4592 T-3	16 October 1977
(134337) 4680 T-3	17 October 1977
(134338) 5080 T-3	16 October 1977
(134339) 5628 T-3	16 October 1977
(136539) 2144 P-L	24 September 1960
(136540) 2543 P-L	24 September 1960
(136541) 3012 P-L	24 September 1960
(136542) 3089 P-L	25 September 1960
(136543) 3111 P-L	24 September 1960
(136544) 4773 P-L	24 September 1960
(136545) 5552 P-L	17 October 1960
(136546) 6208 P-L	24 September 1960
(136547) 6297 P-L	24 September 1960

(136548) 6329 P-L	24 September 1960
(136549) 6702 P-L	24 September 1960
(136550) 6747 P-L	24 September 1960
(136551) 6864 P-L	24 September 1960
(136552) 1047 T-2	29 September 1973
(136553) 1445 T-2	29 September 1973
(136554) 2062 T-2	29 September 1973
(136555) 2254 T-2	29 September 1973
(136556) 3299 T-2	30 September 1973
136557 Neleus	25 September 1973
(136558) 5429 T-2	30 September 1973
(136559) 1035 T-3	17 October 1977
(136560) 1109 T-3	17 October 1977
(136561) 1304 T-3	17 October 1977
(136562) 2609 T-3	16 October 1977
(136563) 3288 T-3	16 October 1977
(145628) 2135 P-L	24 September 1960
(145629) 2188 P-L	24 September 1960
(145630) 2214 P-L	24 September 1960
(145631) 2215 P-L	24 September 1960
(145632) 2216 P-L	24 September 1960
(145633) 2227 P-L	24 September 1960
(145634) 2516 P-L	24 September 1960
(145635) 2585 P-L	24 September 1960
(145636) 2597 P-L	24 September 1960

(145637) 2671 P-L	24 September 1960
(145638) 2715 P-L	24 September 1960
(145639) 2847 P-L	24 September 1960
(145640) 3008 P-L	24 September 1960
(145641) 3562 P-L	17 October 1960
(145642) 4058 P-L	24 September 1960
(145643) 4064 P-L	24 September 1960
(145644) 4107 P-L	24 September 1960
(145645) 4125 P-L	24 September 1960
(145646) 4170 P-L	24 September 1960
(145647) 4193 P-L	24 September 1960
(145648) 4223 P-L	24 September 1960
(145649) 4233 P-L	24 September 1960
(145650) 4242 P-L	24 September 1960
(145651) 4264 P-L	24 September 1960
(145652) 4278 P-L	24 September 1960
(145653) 4333 P-L	24 September 1960
(145654) 4728 P-L	24 September 1960
(145655) 4740 P-L	24 September 1960
(145656) 4788 P-L	24 September 1960
(145657) 6218 P-L	24 September 1960
(145658) 6596 P-L	24 September 1960
(145659) 6697 P-L	24 September 1960
(145660) 6701 P-L	24 September 1960
(145661) 6714 P-L	24 September 1960

(145662) 6737 P-L	24 September 1960
(145663) 6805 P-L	24 September 1960
(145664) 6848 P-L	24 September 1960
(145665) 6859 P-L	24 September 1960
(145666) 6882 P-L	24 September 1960
(145667) 9537 P-L	17 October 1960
(145668) 1071 T-1	25 March 1971
(145669) 2244 T-1	25 March 1971
(145670) 4241 T-1	26 March 1971
(145671) 1073 T-2	29 September 1973
(145672) 1321 T-2	29 September 1973
(145673) 1333 T-2	29 September 1973
(145674) 1524 T-2	29 September 1973
(145675) 2002 T-2	29 September 1973
(145676) 2093 T-2	29 September 1973
(145677) 2172 T-2	29 September 1973
(145678) 2251 T-2	29 September 1973
(145679) 2402 T-2	24 September 1973
(145680) 3002 T-2	30 September 1973
(145681) 3018 T-2	30 September 1973
(145682) 3131 T-2	30 September 1973
(145683) 3275 T-2	30 September 1973
(145684) 3279 T-2	30 September 1973
(145685) 4075 T-2	29 September 1973
(145686) 4077 T-2	29 September 1973

(145687) 1072 T-3	16 October 1977
(145688) 2159 T-3	16 October 1977
(145689) 2219 T-3	16 October 1977
(145690) 2280 T-3	16 October 1977
(145691) 2319 T-3	16 October 1977
(145692) 2625 T-3	16 October 1977
(145693) 3112 T-3	16 October 1977
(145694) 3198 T-3	16 October 1977
(145695) 3290 T-3	16 October 1977
(145696) 3361 T-3	16 October 1977
(145697) 3394 T-3	16 October 1977
(145698) 3471 T-3	16 October 1977
(145699) 3499 T-3	16 October 1977
(145700) 4139 T-3	16 October 1977
(145701) 4269 T-3	16 October 1977
(145702) 4274 T-3	16 October 1977
(145703) 4389 T-3	16 October 1977
(145704) 4537 T-3	16 October 1977
(145705) 5149 T-3	16 October 1977
(147932) 3043 P-L	24 September 1960
(147933) 4744 P-L	24 September 1960
(147934) 6302 P-L	24 September 1960
(147935) 6620 P-L	24 September 1960
(147936) 6728 P-L	24 September 1960
(147937) 1038 T-2	29 September 1973

(147938) 1119 T-2	29 September 1973
(147939) 1413 T-2	30 September 1973
(147940) 2203 T-2	29 September 1973
(147941) 4134 T-2	29 September 1973
(147942) 1058 T-3	17 October 1977
(147943) 1209 T-3	17 October 1977
(147944) 3448 T-3	16 October 1977
(147945) 4021 T-3	16 October 1977
(147946) 4084 T-3	16 October 1977
(147947) 4187 T-3	16 October 1977
(147948) 4211 T-3	16 October 1977
(147949) 4284 T-3	16 October 1977
(147950) 4642 T-3	16 October 1977
(147951) 5156 T-3	16 October 1977
(150092) 4156 P-L	24 September 1960
(150093) 4197 P-L	24 September 1960
(150094) 6845 P-L	24 September 1960
(150095) 1235 T-2	29 September 1973
(150096) 3023 T-2	30 September 1973
(150097) 4319 T-2	29 September 1973
(150098) 5086 T-2	25 September 1973
(150099) 1137 T-3	17 October 1977
(150100) 1229 T-3	17 October 1977
(150101) 2428 T-3	16 October 1977
(150102) 3503 T-3	16 October 1977

(150103) 4262 T-3	16 October 1977
(150104) 5007 T-3	16 October 1977
(150105) 5062 T-3	16 October 1977
(150106) 5084 T-3	16 October 1977
(152536) 4265 P-L	24 September 1960
(152537) 2056 T-1	25 March 1971
(152538) 3035 T-1	26 March 1971
(152539) 3194 T-1	26 March 1971
(152540) 4358 T-1	26 March 1971
(152541) 1140 T-2	29 September 1973
(152542) 3135 T-2	30 September 1973
(152543) 3420 T-2	30 September 1973
(152544) 4427 T-2	30 September 1973
(152545) 4473 T-2	30 September 1973
(152546) 4729 T-2	30 September 1973
(152547) 5052 T-2	25 September 1973
(152548) 5085 T-2	25 September 1973
(152549) 1119 T-3	17 October 1977
(152550) 2677 T-3	11 October 1977
(152551) 3190 T-3	16 October 1977
(152552) 3810 T-3	16 October 1977
(152553) 4264 T-3	16 October 1977
(152554) 4320 T-3	16 October 1977
(155356) 2707 P-L	24 September 1960
(155357) 6096 P-L	24 September 1960

(155358) 6231 P-L	24 September 1960
(155359) 6292 P-L	24 September 1960
(155360) 1031 T-2	29 September 1973
(155361) 1096 T-2	29 September 1973
(155362) 3127 T-3	16 October 1977
(155363) 3207 T-3	16 October 1977
(155364) 3402 T-3	16 October 1977
(155365) 4308 T-3	16 October 1977
(155366) 4557 T-3	16 October 1977
(155367) 5095 T-3	16 October 1977
(155368) 5120 T-3	16 October 1977
(157776) 2770 P-L	24 September 1960
(157777) 6239 P-L	24 September 1960
(157778) 6812 P-L	24 September 1960
(157779) 7582 P-L	17 October 1960
(157780) 7620 P-L	17 October 1960
(157781) 3077 T-2	30 September 1973
(157782) 3296 T-2	30 September 1973
(157783) 2124 T-3	16 October 1977
(157784) 3458 T-3	16 October 1977
(157785) 4233 T-3	16 October 1977
(157786) 4345 T-3	16 October 1977
(157787) 4443 T-3	16 October 1977
(157788) 5020 T-3	16 October 1977
(159364) 4854 P-L	24 September 1960

(159365) 6752 P-L	24 September 1960
(159366) 3133 T-2	30 September 1973
(160010) 6699 P-L	24 September 1960
(160011) 1098 T-2	29 September 1973
(160012) 1110 T-2	29 September 1973
160013 Elbrus	29 September 1973
(160014) 3057 T-2	30 September 1973
(160015) 3079 T-2	30 September 1973
(160507) 3204 T-3	16 October 1977
(160508) 4319 T-3	16 October 1977
(161981) 4745 P-L	24 September 1960
(161982) 6159 P-L	24 September 1960
(161983) 6236 P-L	24 September 1960
(161984) 6515 P-L	24 September 1960
(161985) 1253 T-2	29 September 1973
(161986) 3418 T-2	30 September 1973
(161987) 2026 T-3	16 October 1977
(161988) 4069 T-3	16 October 1977
(164591) 2569 P-L	24 September 1960
(164592) 2761 P-L	24 September 1960
(164593) 4114 P-L	24 September 1960
(164594) 4144 P-L	24 September 1960
(164595) 4791 P-L	24 September 1960
(164596) 4802 P-L	24 September 1960
(164597) 6025 P-L	24 September 1960

(164598) 6252 P-L	24 September 1960
(164599) 6366 P-L	24 September 1960
(164600) 1060 T-2	29 September 1973
(164601) 1123 T-2	29 September 1973
(164602) 1301 T-2	29 September 1973
(164603) 1422 T-2	29 September 1973
(164604) 2054 T-2	29 September 1973
(164605) 4097 T-2	29 September 1973
(164606) 3167 T-3	16 October 1977
(164607) 3273 T-3	16 October 1977
(164608) 3307 T-3	16 October 1977
(164609) 3829 T-3	16 October 1977
(164610) 3840 T-3	16 October 1977
(164611) 4066 T-3	16 October 1977
(164612) 5693 T-3	16 October 1977
(168290) 2045 P-L	24 September 1960
(168291) 3041 P-L	24 September 1960
(168292) 4267 P-L	25 September 1960
(168293) 4724 P-L	24 September 1960
(168294) 4883 P-L	24 September 1960
(168295) 6280 P-L	24 September 1960
(168296) 6740 P-L	24 September 1960
(168297) 7575 P-L	17 October 1960
(168298) 3230 T-1	26 March 1971
(168299) 1048 T-2	29 September 1973

(168300) 1217 T-2	29 September 1973
(168301) 1315 T-2	29 September 1973
(168302) 1428 T-2	29 September 1973
(168303) 2223 T-2	29 September 1973
(168304) 3125 T-2	30 September 1973
(168305) 3205 T-2	30 September 1973
(168306) 4255 T-2	29 September 1973
(168307) 1206 T-3	17 October 1977
(168308) 1216 T-3	17 October 1977
(168309) 2167 T-3	16 October 1977
(168310) 2316 T-3	16 October 1977
(168311) 3312 T-3	16 October 1977
(168312) 3396 T-3	16 October 1977
(168313) 5009 T-3	16 October 1977
(171460) 2170 P-L	24 September 1960
(171461) 2666 P-L	24 September 1960
(171462) 4518 P-L	24 September 1960
(171463) 6272 P-L	24 September 1960
(171464) 6731 P-L	24 September 1960
171465 Evamaria	24 September 1960
(171466) 6862 P-L	24 September 1960
(171467) 2040 T-1	25 March 1971
(171468) 2252 T-1	25 March 1971
(171469) 1103 T-2	29 September 1973
(171470) 1275 T-2	29 September 1973

(171471) 2112 T-3	16 October 1977
(171472) 2195 T-3	16 October 1977
(171473) 3182 T-3	16 October 1977
(171474) 5064 T-3	16 October 1977
(171475) 5151 T-3	16 October 1977
173108 Ingola	24 September 1960
(173109) 7635 P-L	17 October 1960
(173110) 2323 T-1	25 March 1971
(173111) 2059 T-2	29 September 1973
(173112) 4327 T-2	29 September 1973
(173113) 5038 T-2	25 September 1973
(173114) 1195 T-3	17 October 1977
(173115) 3145 T-3	16 October 1977
(173116) 4162 T-3	16 October 1977
173117 Promachus	24 September 1973
(175647) 4091 P-L	24 September 1960
(175648) 4326 P-L	24 September 1960
(175649) 6233 P-L	24 September 1960
(175650) 1408 T-2	29 September 1973
(175651) 3094 T-2	30 September 1973
(175652) 3257 T-2	30 September 1973
(175653) 1014 T-3	17 October 1977
(175654) 2130 T-3	16 October 1977
(175655) 3306 T-3	16 October 1977
(175656) 3397 T-3	16 October 1977

(175657) 3426 T-3	16 October 1977
(175658) 3578 T-3	11 October 1977
(178269) 4178 P-L	24 September 1960
(178270) 6822 P-L	24 September 1960
(178271) 9084 P-L	17 October 1960
(178272) 1312 T-2	29 September 1973
(178273) 1400 T-2	29 September 1973
(178274) 2031 T-2	29 September 1973
(178275) 4080 T-2	29 September 1973
(178276) 5120 T-2	25 September 1973
(178277) 5213 T-2	25 September 1973
(178278) 2136 T-3	16 October 1977
(178279) 2194 T-3	16 October 1977
(178280) 2357 T-3	16 October 1977
(178281) 2635 T-3	16 October 1977
(178282) 3089 T-3	16 October 1977
(178283) 4261 T-3	16 October 1977
(181676) 2213 P-L	22 October 1960
(181677) 2617 P-L	24 September 1960
(181678) 2667 P-L	24 September 1960
(181679) 2724 P-L	24 September 1960
(181680) 4290 P-L	24 September 1960
(181681) 4746 P-L	24 September 1960
(181682) 4786 P-L	24 September 1960
(181683) 4803 P-L	24 September 1960

(181684) 6330 P-L	24 September 1960
(181685) 6645 P-L	27 September 1960
(181686) 6712 P-L	26 September 1960
(181687) 9568 P-L	22 October 1960
(181688) 2331 T-2	30 September 1973
(181689) 3093 T-2	30 September 1973
(181690) 3174 T-2	30 September 1973
(181691) 4089 T-2	29 September 1973
(181692) 4621 T-2	30 September 1973
(181693) 5096 T-2	25 September 1973
(181694) 1049 T-3	17 October 1977
(181695) 3007 T-3	16 October 1977
(181696) 3113 T-3	16 October 1977
(181697) 5185 T-3	16 October 1977
(181698) 5684 T-3	16 October 1977
(181699) 5701 T-3	16 October 1977
(185643) 2040 P-L	24 September 1960
(185644) 4890 P-L	24 September 1960
(185645) 6733 P-L	24 September 1960
(185646) 3217 T-2	30 September 1973
(185647) 4226 T-2	29 September 1973
(185648) 1067 T-3	17 October 1977
(185649) 1802 T-3	17 October 1977
(185650) 2608 T-3	16 October 1977
(185651) 3043 T-3	16 October 1977

(185652) 3199 T-3	16 October 1977
(185653) 3442 T-3	16 October 1977
(185654) 3980 T-3	16 October 1977
(185655) 4368 T-3	16 October 1977
(187737) 2153 P-L	24 September 1960
(187738) 5031 P-L	17 October 1960
(187739) 1168 T-1	25 March 1971
(187740) 1224 T-2	29 September 1973
(187741) 2100 T-3	16 October 1977
(187742) 2351 T-3	16 October 1977
(187743) 3562 T-3	16 October 1977
(187744) 4085 T-3	16 October 1977
(187745) 5137 T-3	16 October 1977
(189001) 4889 P-L	24 September 1960
(189002) 6760 P-L	24 September 1960
(189003) 3009 T-3	16 October 1977
189004 Capys	16 October 1977
(189005) 5176 T-3	16 October 1977
(189406) 4835 P-L	24 September 1960
(189407) 3283 T-2	30 September 1973
(190273) 2822 P-L	24 September 1960
(190274) 3117 P-L	24 September 1960
(190275) 4275 P-L	24 September 1960
(190276) 4548 P-L	24 September 1960
(190277) 6227 P-L	24 September 1960

(190278) 2217 T-2	29 September 1973
(190279) 5143 T-2	25 September 1973
(190280) 2142 T-3	16 October 1977
(190281) 3525 T-3	16 October 1977
(192270) 7642 P-L	17 October 1960
(192271) 3310 T-1	26 March 1971
(192272) 1132 T-2	29 September 1973
(192273) 2299 T-2	29 September 1973
(192274) 1169 T-3	17 October 1977
(192275) 2227 T-3	16 October 1977
(192276) 2498 T-3	16 October 1977
(192277) 3126 T-3	16 October 1977
(192278) 3148 T-3	16 October 1977
(192279) 3153 T-3	16 October 1977
(192280) 3534 T-3	16 October 1977
(200065) 2805 P-L	24 September 1960
(200066) 2836 P-L	24 September 1960
(200067) 4133 P-L	24 September 1960
(200068) 4310 P-L	24 September 1960
200069 Alastor	24 September 1960
(200070) 2090 T-1	25 March 1971
(200071) 2051 T-2	29 September 1973
(200072) 2132 T-2	29 September 1973
(200073) 2190 T-2	29 September 1973
(200074) 2194 T-2	29 September 1973

(200075) 3119 T-2	30 September 1973
(200076) 5009 T-2	25 September 1973
(200077) 5134 T-2	25 September 1973
(200078) 1028 T-3	17 October 1977
(200079) 1138 T-3	17 October 1977
(200080) 2436 T-3	16 October 1977
(200081) 2674 T-3	11 October 1977
(200082) 4022 T-3	16 October 1977
(200083) 5037 T-3	16 October 1977
(202883) 4723 P-L	24 September 1960
(202884) 7590 P-L	17 October 1960
(202885) 3095 T-2	30 September 1973
(204960) 4713 P-L	24 September 1960
(204961) 6377 P-L	24 September 1960
(204962) 5057 T-2	25 September 1973
(207936) 4511 P-L	24 September 1960
(207937) 3367 T-2	25 September 1973
(207938) 2108 T-3	16 October 1977
(207939) 3205 T-3	16 October 1977
(207940) 3518 T-3	16 October 1977
(207941) 3827 T-3	16 October 1977
(207942) 4291 T-3	16 October 1977
(210449) 2136 P-L	24 September 1960
(210450) 2619 P-L	24 September 1960
(210451) 2806 P-L	24 September 1960

(210452) 2032 T-2	29 September 1973
(210453) 2673 T-3	11 October 1977
(210454) 4307 T-3	16 October 1977
(212993) 2132 P-L	24 September 1960
(212994) 6598 P-L	24 September 1960
(212995) 1230 T-2	29 September 1973
(212996) 3226 T-2	30 September 1973
(212997) 3238 T-2	30 September 1973
212998 Tolbachik	16 October 1977
(212999) 4330 T-3	16 October 1977
(215088) 2220 P-L	24 September 1960
215089 Hermanfrid	24 September 1960
(215090) 2823 P-L	24 September 1960
(215091) 6228 P-L	24 September 1960
(215092) 6256 P-L	24 September 1960
(215093) 6823 P-L	24 September 1960
(215094) 5043 T-2	25 September 1973
(215095) 3131 T-3	16 October 1977
(215096) 3259 T-3	16 October 1977
(215097) 5049 T-3	16 October 1977
(215098) 5053 T-3	16 October 1977
(216460) 1250 T-2	29 September 1973
(216461) 2025 T-2	29 September 1973
216462 Polyphontes	30 September 1973
(216463) 1849 T-3	17 October 1977

(216913) 4533 P-L	24 September 1960
(216914) 1084 T-2	29 September 1973
(216915) 1194 T-2	29 September 1973
(216916) 1159 T-3	17 October 1977
(217624) 5003 T-2	25 September 1973
(217625) 5408 T-2	30 September 1973
(217626) 1027 T-3	17 October 1977
(217627) 1064 T-3	17 October 1977
(219011) 2734 P-L	24 September 1960
(219012) 4762 P-L	24 September 1960
(219013) 6253 P-L	24 September 1960
(219014) 6768 P-L	24 September 1960
(219015) 1531 T-2	29 September 1973
(219016) 3191 T-2	30 September 1973
(219017) 3156 T-3	16 October 1977
(219018) 4219 T-3	16 October 1977
(221937) 2066 P-L	24 September 1960
(221938) 3019 P-L	24 September 1960
(221939) 6017 P-L	24 September 1960
(221940) 6508 P-L	24 September 1960
(221941) 1146 T-2	29 September 1973
(221942) 1543 T-2	29 September 1973
(221943) 1190 T-3	17 October 1977
(221944) 2339 T-3	16 October 1977
(221945) 3227 T-3	16 October 1977

(225273) 2128 P-L	26 September 1960
(225274) 6781 P-L	24 September 1960
(225275) 6890 P-L	24 September 1960
225276 Leïtos	29 September 1973
(228193) 2693 P-L	24 September 1960
(228194) 3046 P-L	24 September 1960
(228195) 6675 P-L	24 September 1960
(228196) 7574 P-L	17 October 1960
(228197) 2149 T-3	16 October 1977
(228198) 3200 T-3	16 October 1977
(228199) 3765 T-3	16 October 1977
(228200) 4088 T-3	16 October 1977
(228201) 4106 T-3	16 October 1977
(228202) 5058 T-3	16 October 1977
(228203) 5772 T-3	16 October 1977
(229907) 4513 P-L	24 September 1960
(229908) 6005 P-L	24 September 1960
(229909) 6201 P-L	24 September 1960
(229910) 6798 P-L	24 September 1960
(229911) 2107 T-3	16 October 1977
(229912) 4378 T-3	16 October 1977
(229913) 4503 T-3	16 October 1977
(229914) 5104 T-3	16 October 1977
(231665) 7602 P-L	17 October 1960
(233968) 3021 T-2	30 September 1973

(237351) 2235 P-L	24 September 1960
(237352) 4307 P-L	24 September 1960
(237353) 1207 T-2	29 September 1973
(237354) 1711 T-2	29 September 1973
(237355) 2296 T-2	29 September 1973
(237356) 3103 T-2	30 September 1973
(237357) 2059 T-3	16 October 1977
(237358) 3206 T-3	16 October 1977
(237359) 3774 T-3	16 October 1977
(237360) 4539 T-3	16 October 1977
(239794) 6715 P-L	24 September 1960
(239795) 1273 T-2	29 September 1973
(239796) 2300 T-3	16 October 1977
(239797) 3037 T-3	16 October 1977
(241560) 5002 T-2	25 September 1973
(241561) 2397 T-3	16 October 1977
(241562) 4192 T-3	16 October 1977
(243550) 1240 T-2	29 September 1973
(243551) 3266 T-3	16 October 1977
(243552) 4514 T-3	16 October 1977
(243553) 5066 T-3	16 October 1977
(246862) 2655 P-L	24 September 1960
(246863) 2697 P-L	24 September 1960
(246864) 6379 P-L	24 September 1960
(246865) 6770 P-L	24 September 1960

(246866) 1356 T-2	29 September 1973
(246867) 2057 T-2	29 September 1973
(246868) 1366 T-3	17 October 1977
(246869) 4583 T-3	16 October 1977
(249558) 2858 P-L	24 September 1960
(249559) 3079 P-L	25 September 1960
(249560) 4176 P-L	24 September 1960
(249561) 4547 P-L	24 September 1960
(249562) 5019 T-2	25 September 1973
(249563) 2233 T-3	16 October 1977
(249564) 2238 T-3	16 October 1977
(249565) 2298 T-3	16 October 1977
(249566) 3386 T-3	16 October 1977
(249567) 5102 T-3	16 October 1977
(251647) 2834 P-L	24 September 1960
(251648) 4277 P-L	24 September 1960
(251649) 1208 T-2	29 September 1973
(251650) 2197 T-3	16 October 1977
(251651) 2336 T-3	16 October 1977
(257443) 2641 P-L	24 September 1960
(257444) 4188 P-L	24 September 1960
(257445) 6010 P-L	24 September 1960
(257446) 6251 P-L	24 September 1960
(257447) 1037 T-2	29 September 1973
(257448) 2236 T-2	29 September 1973

(257449) 4219 T-2	29 September 1973
(257450) 2005 T-3	16 October 1977
(257451) 2138 T-3	16 October 1977
(257452) 2408 T-3	16 October 1977
(257453) 4003 T-3	16 October 1977
(257454) 4154 T-3	16 October 1977
(257455) 4311 T-3	16 October 1977
(264248) 2176 P-L	24 September 1960
(264249) 4539 P-L	24 September 1960
(264250) 1447 T-2	29 September 1973
(264251) 3301 T-2	30 September 1973
(264252) 4205 T-2	29 September 1973
(264253) 1104 T-3	17 October 1977
(264254) 2259 T-3	16 October 1977
(264255) 2323 T-3	16 October 1977
(264256) 3031 T-3	16 October 1977
(264257) 4114 T-3	16 October 1977
(264258) 4232 T-3	16 October 1977
(266999) 5039 P-L	22 October 1960
(267000) 6229 P-L	25 September 1960
(267001) 1094 T-3	17 October 1977
(267002) 3807 T-3	16 October 1977
(269641) 4245 P-L	24 September 1960
(269642) 6215 P-L	24 September 1960
(269643) 6765 P-L	24 September 1960

(269644) 2642 T-3	16 October 1977
(275484) 4325 P-L	24 September 1960
(275485) 5074 T-2	25 September 1973
(275486) 2405 T-3	16 October 1977
(275487) 2413 T-3	16 October 1977
(275488) 3212 T-3	16 October 1977
(275489) 4518 T-3	16 October 1977
(275490) 5088 T-3	16 October 1977
(279506) 2011 AQ_{55}	24 September 1973
(279718) 1579 T-2	24 September 1973
(279719) 5449 T-2	30 September 1973
(279720) 5475 T-2	30 September 1973
(279721) 1172 T-3	17 October 1977
(279722) 5741 T-3	16 October 1977
(282024) 2852 P-L	24 September 1960
(282025) 5347 T-2	30 September 1973
(282026) 2184 T-3	16 October 1977
(282027) 5069 T-3	16 October 1977
(283316) 1029 T-3	17 October 1977
(283317) 2049 T-3	16 October 1977
(285077) 2227 T-2	29 September 1973
(285078) 2459 T-3	16 October 1977
(287350) 2002 TA_{387}	24 September 1960
(297116) 2010 RB_{72}	9 September 1977
(297132) 2010 TJ_{2}	24 September 1960

(297226) 4219 P-L	24 September 1960
(297227) 3473 T-2	25 September 1973
(297228) 1012 T-3	17 October 1977
(297229) 2126 T-3	16 October 1977
(297230) 2205 T-3	16 October 1977
(297231) 2320 T-3	16 October 1977
(297232) 3388 T-3	16 October 1977
(297233) 5100 T-3	16 October 1977
(301837) 5581 P-L	22 October 1960
(301838) 6226 P-L	24 September 1960
(301839) 1488 T-2	29 September 1973
(301840) 4212 T-3	16 October 1977
(301841) 4260 T-3	16 October 1977
(306223) 2011 QE_{50}	12 October 1977
(306229) 2011 QG_{61}	11 October 1977
(306365) 2233 P-L	24 September 1960
(306366) 2842 P-L	24 September 1960
306367 Nut	22 October 1960
(306368) 6259 P-L	24 September 1960
(306369) 6883 P-L	24 September 1960
(306370) 3154 T-1	26 March 1971
(306371) 4282 T-2	29 September 1973
(306372) 4285 T-2	29 September 1973
(306373) 1125 T-3	17 October 1977
(306374) 3362 T-3	16 October 1977

(310243) 2011 UE_{6}	11 October 1977
(310303) 2011 UN_{103}	19 September 1973
(310373) 2718 P-L	24 September 1960
(310374) 1046 T-2	29 September 1973
(310375) 2639 T-3	16 October 1977
(310376) 3318 T-3	16 October 1977
(312863) 2011 UX_{141}	11 October 1977
(312873) 2011 UD_{164}	11 October 1977
(312935) 5042 T-3	16 October 1977
(316616) 2011 WT_{43}	24 September 1960
(316649) 1019 T-2	29 September 1973
(322305) 2011 FA_{122}	7 October 1977
(322606) 4714 P-L	24 September 1960
(322607) 6185 P-L	24 September 1960
(322608) 6363 P-L	24 September 1960
(322609) 1406 T-2	29 September 1973
(322610) 1438 T-2	30 September 1973
(322611) 3506 T-3	16 October 1977
(326263) 2741 P-L	24 September 1960
(326264) 3488 T-3	16 October 1977
(326265) 3494 T-3	16 October 1977
(326266) 5087 T-3	16 October 1977
(329242) 4564 T-2	30 September 1973
(329243) 4063 T-3	16 October 1977
(331469) 6006 P-L	24 September 1960

(331470) 3171 T-3	16 October 1977
(333027) 2011 SC_{12}	11 October 1977
(333270) 2146 P-L	24 September 1960
(333271) 4318 P-L	24 September 1960
(333272) 1345 T-2	29 September 1973
(333273) 4276 T-2	29 September 1973
(333841) 1121 T-3	17 October 1977
(337004) 6507 P-L	24 September 1960
(337005) 2096 T-2	29 September 1973
(337006) 1062 T-3	17 October 1977
(337007) 2145 T-3	16 October 1977
(337008) 2348 T-3	16 October 1977
(344047) 4331 P-L	24 September 1960
(344048) 6807 P-L	24 September 1960
(344049) 6865 P-L	24 September 1960
(344050) 1254 T-2	29 September 1973
(344051) 4074 T-2	29 September 1973
(344052) 4121 T-2	29 September 1973
(344053) 5478 T-2	30 September 1973
(344054) 4185 T-3	16 October 1977
(344055) 4530 T-3	16 October 1977
(347361) 2012 QV_{41}	16 October 1977
(347480) 3291 T-2	30 September 1973
(347481) 1174 T-3	17 October 1977
(350441) 5073 T-3	16 October 1977

(353375) 2011 KT_{47}	7 October 1977
(353486) 2011 SO_{63}	9 September 1977
(353923) 4531 P-L	24 September 1960
(353924) 6756 P-L	24 September 1960
(353925) 1199 T-2	29 September 1973
(353926) 1101 T-3	17 October 1977
(356526) 2011 SR_{102}	7 October 1977
(365426) 2010 KC_{61}	11 October 1977
(366341) 4082 T-2	29 September 1973
(369956) 6241 P-L	24 September 1960
(379920) 2012 KQ_{11}	24 September 1960
(380012) 2013 PN_{11}	24 September 1960
(380091) 2013 SH_{57}	11 October 1977
(382388) 2013 TP_{127}	11 October 1977
(382394) 3549 P-L	17 October 1960
(385184) 4119 T-3	16 October 1977
(387487) 4169 T-3	16 October 1977
(388560) 2007 PY_{17}	19 September 1973
(390382) 2013 WM_{14}	24 September 1960
(390514) 4209 T-3	16 October 1977
(392708) 2012 BO_{117}	16 October 1977
(393346) 4329 P-L	24 September 1960
(393347) 4725 P-L	24 September 1960
(395388) 2011 SF_{67}	24 September 1960
(396539) 6283 P-L	24 September 1960

(398337) 2011 QZ_{36}	11 October 1977
(398569) 2011 WW_{14}	20 September 1973
(399306) 5400 T-3	16 October 1977
(401000) 2011 QV_{13}	8 September 1977
(401490) 2013 DV_{8}	19 September 1973
(401809) 3195 T-2	30 September 1973
(401810) 3165 T-3	16 October 1977
(401888) 2001 RR_{56}	24 September 1960
(403730) 2010 XX_{10}	11 October 1977
(404943) 6824 P-L	24 September 1960
(404944) 3493 T-3	16 October 1977
(408750) 4308 P-L	24 September 1960
(412974) 2237 P-L	24 September 1960
(412975) 5055 T-2	25 September 1973
(415688) 5113 T-2	25 September 1973
(420820) 2013 HZ_{94}	24 September 1960
(420919) 2013 NQ_{3}	30 September 1973
(421686) 2014 OE_{392}	16 October 1977
(422237) 2014 SZ_{20}	24 September 1960
(422263) 2014 SJ_{144}	12 October 1977
(422265) 2014 SS_{147}	24 September 1960
(422630) 2036 P-L	24 September 1960
(422631) 4165 P-L	24 September 1960
(422632) 6510 P-L	24 September 1960
(422633) 1349 T-2	29 September 1973

(422634) 2401 T-3	12 October 1977
(422635) 2604 T-3	16 October 1977
(422636) 3375 T-3	16 October 1977
(427379) 2014 XD_{17}	9 September 1977
(430314) 2013 XG_{16}	24 September 1960
(433937) 4216 P-L	24 September 1960
(437671) 2014 CS_{15}	24 September 1960
(437830) 3383 T-3	16 October 1977
(437831) 3716 T-3	16 October 1977
(437832) 3752 T-3	16 October 1977
(439342) 2012 XY_{12}	19 September 1973
(442319) 2011 SF_{121}	11 October 1977
(443795) 1917 T-3	17 October 1977
(450018) 2015 PN_{310}	12 October 1977
(452144) 2015 RL_{19}	11 October 1977
(454984) 2015 TT_{223}	11 October 1977
(458777) 2011 SR_{103}	11 October 1977
(461339) 6365 P-L	24 September 1960
(461340) 3073 T-2	30 September 1973
(464662) 2001 SD_{119}	24 September 1960
(471655) 2012 TQ_{125}	7 October 1977
(474120) 4504 P-L	24 September 1960
(477375) 2009 UE_{137}	11 October 1977
(477375) 2009 UE_{137}	11 October 1977
(480805) 2687 P-L	24 September 1960
(480806) 1083 T-1	25 March 1971

(483390) 5059 T-3	16 October 1977
(493111) 2014 TN_{7}	24 September 1960
(493396) 2014 WD_{163}	11 October 1977
(493493) 2015 AZ_{220}	17 October 1960
(493645) 2015 QL_{9}	24 September 1960
(494080) 2016 BY_{76}	11 October 1977
(496706) 2016 EB_{169}	24 September 1960
(503848) 4702 P-L	24 September 1960
(503849) 1453 T-2	29 September 1973
(503850) 4150 T-3	16 October 1977
(506410) 1131 T-3	17 October 1977
(508765) 2108 P-L	24 September 1960
(523825) 1977 RS	8 September 1977
(530626) 2011 SH_{111}	24 September 1960
(534884) 2014 WL_{289}	29 September 1973
(535213) 2014 YZ_{28}	24 September 1973
All discoveries made by: C. J. van Houten I. van Houten-Groeneveld T. Gehrels

== See also ==
- List of minor planet discoverers
- National Geographic Society – Palomar Observatory Sky Survey (NGS-POSS)
