= List of minor planets: 421001–422000 =

The following is a partial list of minor planets, running from minor-planet number 421001 through 422000, inclusive. The primary data for this and other partial lists is based on JPL's "Small-Body Orbital Elements" and data available from the Minor Planet Center. Critical list information is also provided by the MPC, unless otherwise specified from Lowell Observatory. A detailed description of the table's columns and additional sources are given on the main page including a complete list of every page in this series, and a statistical break-up on the dynamical classification of minor planets.

Also see the summary list of all named bodies in numerical and alphabetical order, and the corresponding naming citations for the number range of this particular list. New namings may only be added to this list after official publication, as the preannouncement of names is condemned by the Working Group for Small Bodies Nomenclature of the International Astronomical Union.

Near-Earth obj.	MBA (inner)	MBA (outer)	Centaur
Mars-crosser	MBA (middle)	Jupiter trojan	Trans-Neptunian obj.
Unclassified

== 421001–421100 ==
Designation			Discovery			Properties		Ref
Permanent	Provisional	Named after	Date	Site	Discoverer(s)	Category	Diam.	Ref
421001	2013 PH_{45}	—	February 5, 2011	Haleakala	Pan-STARRS 1	·	2.8 km	MPC · JPL
421002	2013 PQ_{45}	—	June 21, 2007	Mount Lemmon	Mount Lemmon Survey	·	3.5 km	MPC · JPL
421003	2013 PS_{45}	—	October 27, 2005	Kitt Peak	Spacewatch	·	1.5 km	MPC · JPL
421004	2013 PX_{45}	—	September 16, 2010	Kitt Peak	Spacewatch	(2076)	860 m	MPC · JPL
421005	2013 PF_{46}	—	December 13, 2004	Kitt Peak	Spacewatch	·	930 m	MPC · JPL
421006	2013 PT_{46}	—	February 8, 2007	Palomar	NEAT	·	2.5 km	MPC · JPL
421007	2013 PJ_{49}	—	March 1, 2010	WISE	WISE	·	5.4 km	MPC · JPL
421008	2013 PT_{49}	—	February 2, 2005	Kitt Peak	Spacewatch	·	870 m	MPC · JPL
421009	2013 PK_{50}	—	October 5, 2003	Kitt Peak	Spacewatch	EOS	2.2 km	MPC · JPL
421010	2013 PW_{50}	—	October 24, 2009	Mount Lemmon	Mount Lemmon Survey	EUN	1.4 km	MPC · JPL
421011	2013 PN_{52}	—	September 14, 2007	Mount Lemmon	Mount Lemmon Survey	·	900 m	MPC · JPL
421012	2013 PK_{55}	—	February 4, 2005	Kitt Peak	Spacewatch	·	1.9 km	MPC · JPL
421013	2013 PO_{55}	—	October 2, 2008	Mount Lemmon	Mount Lemmon Survey	·	2.2 km	MPC · JPL
421014	2013 PP_{56}	—	March 18, 2001	Kitt Peak	Spacewatch	EOS	2.2 km	MPC · JPL
421015	2013 PT_{56}	—	March 12, 2005	Mount Lemmon	Mount Lemmon Survey	·	850 m	MPC · JPL
421016	2013 PR_{57}	—	May 4, 2005	Palomar	NEAT	·	1.8 km	MPC · JPL
421017	2013 PJ_{58}	—	September 6, 2008	Mount Lemmon	Mount Lemmon Survey	·	2.8 km	MPC · JPL
421018	2013 PM_{59}	—	June 20, 2013	Haleakala	Pan-STARRS 1	·	3.3 km	MPC · JPL
421019	2013 PC_{60}	—	November 30, 2005	Mount Lemmon	Mount Lemmon Survey	(16286)	2.0 km	MPC · JPL
421020	2013 PG_{60}	—	March 12, 2007	Kitt Peak	Spacewatch	·	2.3 km	MPC · JPL
421021	2013 PX_{61}	—	November 25, 2005	Mount Lemmon	Mount Lemmon Survey	·	2.4 km	MPC · JPL
421022	2013 PL_{62}	—	December 13, 2004	Kitt Peak	Spacewatch	·	2.9 km	MPC · JPL
421023	2013 PO_{62}	—	September 29, 2003	Kitt Peak	Spacewatch	·	2.1 km	MPC · JPL
421024	2013 PO_{63}	—	October 10, 1996	Kitt Peak	Spacewatch	·	1.6 km	MPC · JPL
421025	2013 PR_{63}	—	October 28, 2005	Campo Imperatore	CINEOS	·	1.6 km	MPC · JPL
421026	2013 PY_{63}	—	September 19, 2003	Kitt Peak	Spacewatch	·	2.5 km	MPC · JPL
421027	2013 PO_{64}	—	November 2, 2005	Mount Lemmon	Mount Lemmon Survey	·	1.7 km	MPC · JPL
421028	2013 PS_{64}	—	November 27, 2000	Kitt Peak	Spacewatch	·	1.8 km	MPC · JPL
421029	2013 PZ_{64}	—	August 27, 2009	Kitt Peak	Spacewatch	·	1.5 km	MPC · JPL
421030	2013 PK_{65}	—	December 13, 2009	Mount Lemmon	Mount Lemmon Survey	·	3.5 km	MPC · JPL
421031	2013 PL_{65}	—	November 24, 2009	Kitt Peak	Spacewatch	·	1.4 km	MPC · JPL
421032	2013 PM_{65}	—	April 3, 2008	Mount Lemmon	Mount Lemmon Survey	L5	9.9 km	MPC · JPL
421033	2013 PQ_{65}	—	December 18, 2009	Mount Lemmon	Mount Lemmon Survey	EOS	1.8 km	MPC · JPL
421034	2013 PW_{65}	—	February 24, 2012	Kitt Peak	Spacewatch	·	1.3 km	MPC · JPL
421035	2013 PA_{66}	—	November 3, 2008	Mount Lemmon	Mount Lemmon Survey	·	3.0 km	MPC · JPL
421036	2013 PF_{68}	—	October 2, 2006	Mount Lemmon	Mount Lemmon Survey	3:2	4.4 km	MPC · JPL
421037	2013 PM_{68}	—	September 16, 2006	Kitt Peak	Spacewatch	·	1.0 km	MPC · JPL
421038	2013 PP_{68}	—	September 11, 2004	Kitt Peak	Spacewatch	·	2.2 km	MPC · JPL
421039	2013 PV_{68}	—	March 16, 2007	Kitt Peak	Spacewatch	·	2.2 km	MPC · JPL
421040	2013 PO_{70}	—	March 25, 2012	Mount Lemmon	Mount Lemmon Survey	(18466)	2.4 km	MPC · JPL
421041	2013 PQ_{70}	—	August 4, 2002	Palomar	NEAT	·	2.9 km	MPC · JPL
421042	2013 PG_{71}	—	September 26, 2003	Apache Point	SDSS	·	1.9 km	MPC · JPL
421043	2013 PO_{71}	—	October 2, 2006	Mount Lemmon	Mount Lemmon Survey	·	1.3 km	MPC · JPL
421044	2013 PW_{71}	—	August 5, 2005	Palomar	NEAT	·	1.3 km	MPC · JPL
421045	2013 PY_{72}	—	September 21, 2003	Kitt Peak	Spacewatch	·	2.4 km	MPC · JPL
421046	2013 PE_{73}	—	February 7, 2006	Mount Lemmon	Mount Lemmon Survey	·	3.1 km	MPC · JPL
421047	2013 PH_{73}	—	August 23, 2003	Cerro Tololo	Deep Ecliptic Survey	KOR	1.5 km	MPC · JPL
421048	2013 PK_{74}	—	September 18, 2003	Kitt Peak	Spacewatch	·	2.9 km	MPC · JPL
421049	2013 QP	—	October 1, 2009	Mount Lemmon	Mount Lemmon Survey	·	1.9 km	MPC · JPL
421050	2013 QV	—	November 21, 2003	Palomar	NEAT	·	3.9 km	MPC · JPL
421051	2013 QB_{1}	—	October 5, 2004	Kitt Peak	Spacewatch	·	2.3 km	MPC · JPL
421052	2013 QL_{1}	—	March 2, 2005	Socorro	LINEAR	PHO	1.3 km	MPC · JPL
421053	2013 QQ_{2}	—	July 29, 2009	Kitt Peak	Spacewatch	·	1.4 km	MPC · JPL
421054	2013 QL_{3}	—	September 23, 2008	Kitt Peak	Spacewatch	·	2.8 km	MPC · JPL
421055	2013 QH_{4}	—	January 11, 2011	Kitt Peak	Spacewatch	·	2.0 km	MPC · JPL
421056	2013 QM_{6}	—	March 15, 2007	Kitt Peak	Spacewatch	KOR	1.3 km	MPC · JPL
421057	2013 QL_{7}	—	April 22, 2007	Kitt Peak	Spacewatch	·	1.9 km	MPC · JPL
421058	2013 QO_{7}	—	November 17, 2009	Mount Lemmon	Mount Lemmon Survey	EOS	1.9 km	MPC · JPL
421059	2013 QU_{7}	—	September 9, 2008	Mount Lemmon	Mount Lemmon Survey	·	2.6 km	MPC · JPL
421060	2013 QD_{10}	—	March 12, 2002	Palomar	NEAT	·	2.4 km	MPC · JPL
421061	2013 QS_{12}	—	September 20, 2001	Apache Point	SDSS	·	6.1 km	MPC · JPL
421062	2013 QU_{12}	—	March 20, 2007	Mount Lemmon	Mount Lemmon Survey	·	1.4 km	MPC · JPL
421063	2013 QK_{13}	—	January 13, 2005	Catalina	CSS	·	3.4 km	MPC · JPL
421064	2013 QO_{16}	—	October 7, 2008	Mount Lemmon	Mount Lemmon Survey	·	3.6 km	MPC · JPL
421065	2013 QB_{20}	—	September 19, 2006	Kitt Peak	Spacewatch	·	1.3 km	MPC · JPL
421066	2013 QA_{21}	—	December 18, 2004	Mount Lemmon	Mount Lemmon Survey	·	2.1 km	MPC · JPL
421067	2013 QH_{23}	—	February 25, 2006	Kitt Peak	Spacewatch	·	2.6 km	MPC · JPL
421068	2013 QN_{23}	—	November 25, 2009	Kitt Peak	Spacewatch	·	1.9 km	MPC · JPL
421069	2013 QU_{23}	—	September 28, 2008	Mount Lemmon	Mount Lemmon Survey	·	2.6 km	MPC · JPL
421070	2013 QO_{25}	—	February 8, 2011	Mount Lemmon	Mount Lemmon Survey	·	2.7 km	MPC · JPL
421071	2013 QZ_{25}	—	January 27, 2007	Mount Lemmon	Mount Lemmon Survey	·	1.7 km	MPC · JPL
421072	2013 QO_{26}	—	March 25, 2010	WISE	WISE	·	4.9 km	MPC · JPL
421073	2013 QB_{28}	—	May 30, 2003	Cerro Tololo	Deep Ecliptic Survey	·	1.5 km	MPC · JPL
421074	2013 QO_{28}	—	October 18, 2003	Kitt Peak	Spacewatch	·	2.1 km	MPC · JPL
421075	2013 QV_{29}	—	March 4, 2005	Kitt Peak	Spacewatch	EOS	1.9 km	MPC · JPL
421076	2013 QL_{31}	—	December 11, 2009	Mount Lemmon	Mount Lemmon Survey	·	3.1 km	MPC · JPL
421077	2013 QT_{35}	—	October 13, 2010	Mount Lemmon	Mount Lemmon Survey	V	660 m	MPC · JPL
421078	2013 QF_{37}	—	September 23, 2008	Kitt Peak	Spacewatch	·	2.9 km	MPC · JPL
421079	2013 QK_{37}	—	October 7, 2004	Kitt Peak	Spacewatch	·	1.8 km	MPC · JPL
421080	2013 QS_{38}	—	January 27, 2000	Kitt Peak	Spacewatch	·	3.5 km	MPC · JPL
421081	2013 QJ_{40}	—	October 23, 2009	Mount Lemmon	Mount Lemmon Survey	·	1.9 km	MPC · JPL
421082	2013 QK_{41}	—	March 31, 2012	Mount Lemmon	Mount Lemmon Survey	·	3.0 km	MPC · JPL
421083	2013 QA_{43}	—	October 24, 2009	Kitt Peak	Spacewatch	·	2.0 km	MPC · JPL
421084	2013 QS_{43}	—	September 19, 2003	Palomar	NEAT	·	1.4 km	MPC · JPL
421085	2013 QA_{47}	—	July 24, 2003	Palomar	NEAT	BRA	2.3 km	MPC · JPL
421086	2013 QK_{47}	—	October 2, 1999	Kitt Peak	Spacewatch	·	1.1 km	MPC · JPL
421087	2013 QF_{49}	—	November 22, 2009	Mount Lemmon	Mount Lemmon Survey	·	2.9 km	MPC · JPL
421088	2013 QR_{50}	—	October 7, 2004	Kitt Peak	Spacewatch	HOF	2.8 km	MPC · JPL
421089	2013 QE_{53}	—	September 22, 2008	Kitt Peak	Spacewatch	·	3.1 km	MPC · JPL
421090	2013 QS_{53}	—	September 29, 2003	Kitt Peak	Spacewatch	·	1.7 km	MPC · JPL
421091	2013 QG_{54}	—	October 23, 2003	Apache Point	SDSS	·	2.1 km	MPC · JPL
421092	2013 QH_{54}	—	April 24, 2007	Kitt Peak	Spacewatch	·	2.0 km	MPC · JPL
421093	2013 QK_{54}	—	September 13, 2004	Kitt Peak	Spacewatch	·	2.0 km	MPC · JPL
421094	2013 QR_{54}	—	August 18, 2006	Kitt Peak	Spacewatch	·	1.2 km	MPC · JPL
421095	2013 QH_{56}	—	May 16, 2012	Kitt Peak	Spacewatch	·	2.7 km	MPC · JPL
421096	2013 QJ_{56}	—	November 20, 2008	Mount Lemmon	Mount Lemmon Survey	·	3.4 km	MPC · JPL
421097	2013 QD_{57}	—	March 26, 2007	Mount Lemmon	Mount Lemmon Survey	HOF	2.7 km	MPC · JPL
421098	2013 QC_{60}	—	November 3, 2005	Mount Lemmon	Mount Lemmon Survey	·	1.5 km	MPC · JPL
421099	2013 QG_{60}	—	March 9, 2003	Palomar	NEAT	·	2.2 km	MPC · JPL
421100	2013 QR_{60}	—	March 11, 2011	Kitt Peak	Spacewatch	EOS	1.9 km	MPC · JPL

== 421101–421200 ==
back to top

Designation			Discovery			Properties		Ref
Permanent	Provisional	Named after	Date	Site	Discoverer(s)	Category	Diam.	Ref
421101	2013 QX_{61}	—	February 1, 2006	Mount Lemmon	Mount Lemmon Survey	·	2.8 km	MPC · JPL
421102	2013 QT_{64}	—	March 26, 2004	Kitt Peak	Spacewatch	·	1.2 km	MPC · JPL
421103	2013 QM_{65}	—	May 18, 2007	Kitt Peak	Spacewatch	·	2.2 km	MPC · JPL
421104	2013 QA_{67}	—	October 29, 2008	Mount Lemmon	Mount Lemmon Survey	·	2.8 km	MPC · JPL
421105	2013 QK_{67}	—	September 16, 2009	Kitt Peak	Spacewatch	·	1.5 km	MPC · JPL
421106	2013 QX_{68}	—	January 16, 2005	Kitt Peak	Spacewatch	·	3.4 km	MPC · JPL
421107	2013 QB_{69}	—	March 9, 2005	Kitt Peak	Spacewatch	·	3.2 km	MPC · JPL
421108	2013 QC_{69}	—	May 10, 2007	Mount Lemmon	Mount Lemmon Survey	·	2.1 km	MPC · JPL
421109	2013 QJ_{69}	—	December 10, 2010	Mount Lemmon	Mount Lemmon Survey	·	2.4 km	MPC · JPL
421110	2013 QM_{69}	—	June 14, 2009	Kitt Peak	Spacewatch	·	1.4 km	MPC · JPL
421111	2013 QT_{69}	—	January 13, 2002	Kitt Peak	Spacewatch	·	3.2 km	MPC · JPL
421112	2013 QX_{69}	—	December 25, 2010	Mount Lemmon	Mount Lemmon Survey	PHO	1.4 km	MPC · JPL
421113	2013 QY_{69}	—	September 11, 2004	Socorro	LINEAR	·	3.0 km	MPC · JPL
421114	2013 QF_{71}	—	June 11, 2004	Palomar	NEAT	·	1.8 km	MPC · JPL
421115	2013 QE_{75}	—	March 28, 2008	Kitt Peak	Spacewatch	·	1.8 km	MPC · JPL
421116	2013 QS_{75}	—	October 23, 2005	Catalina	CSS	·	2.0 km	MPC · JPL
421117	2013 QW_{75}	—	July 30, 2005	Palomar	NEAT	·	1.1 km	MPC · JPL
421118	2013 QF_{76}	—	August 16, 2009	Kitt Peak	Spacewatch	·	1.2 km	MPC · JPL
421119	2013 QK_{76}	—	September 22, 2008	Kitt Peak	Spacewatch	·	3.3 km	MPC · JPL
421120	2013 QQ_{76}	—	August 24, 2008	Kitt Peak	Spacewatch	·	1.9 km	MPC · JPL
421121	2013 QY_{76}	—	February 14, 2005	Kitt Peak	Spacewatch	·	2.9 km	MPC · JPL
421122	2013 QS_{78}	—	December 30, 2000	Kitt Peak	Spacewatch	·	2.3 km	MPC · JPL
421123	2013 QH_{80}	—	September 26, 2008	Kitt Peak	Spacewatch	·	2.6 km	MPC · JPL
421124	2013 QM_{81}	—	August 8, 2004	Socorro	LINEAR	·	1.8 km	MPC · JPL
421125	2013 QL_{83}	—	October 3, 2006	Mount Lemmon	Mount Lemmon Survey	·	1.5 km	MPC · JPL
421126	2013 QJ_{84}	—	August 28, 2005	Anderson Mesa	LONEOS	T_{j} (2.96) · 3:2	6.4 km	MPC · JPL
421127	2013 QX_{84}	—	January 10, 2000	Kitt Peak	Spacewatch	NYS	1.5 km	MPC · JPL
421128	2013 QA_{86}	—	October 12, 1999	Kitt Peak	Spacewatch	·	1.4 km	MPC · JPL
421129	2013 QU_{86}	—	March 31, 1995	Kitt Peak	Spacewatch	·	1.3 km	MPC · JPL
421130	2013 QZ_{91}	—	October 22, 2005	Kitt Peak	Spacewatch	·	1.7 km	MPC · JPL
421131	2013 QN_{92}	—	February 27, 2006	Mount Lemmon	Mount Lemmon Survey	·	2.0 km	MPC · JPL
421132	2013 RO	—	January 20, 2009	Mount Lemmon	Mount Lemmon Survey	·	3.6 km	MPC · JPL
421133	2013 RC_{2}	—	March 13, 2011	Catalina	CSS	·	2.7 km	MPC · JPL
421134	2013 RL_{3}	—	September 11, 2001	Kitt Peak	Spacewatch	L5	8.1 km	MPC · JPL
421135	2013 RA_{7}	—	August 15, 2013	Haleakala	Pan-STARRS 1	·	2.6 km	MPC · JPL
421136	2013 RQ_{7}	—	August 15, 2013	Haleakala	Pan-STARRS 1	·	3.0 km	MPC · JPL
421137	2013 RB_{8}	—	September 9, 2008	Mount Lemmon	Mount Lemmon Survey	·	2.1 km	MPC · JPL
421138	2013 RW_{11}	—	September 27, 2008	Mount Lemmon	Mount Lemmon Survey	·	3.1 km	MPC · JPL
421139	2013 RO_{15}	—	July 26, 1995	Kitt Peak	Spacewatch	·	1.8 km	MPC · JPL
421140	2013 RB_{17}	—	February 22, 2011	Kitt Peak	Spacewatch	EOS	1.7 km	MPC · JPL
421141	2013 RY_{17}	—	September 25, 2005	Kitt Peak	Spacewatch	·	1.4 km	MPC · JPL
421142	2013 RO_{18}	—	September 22, 2008	Catalina	CSS	·	2.0 km	MPC · JPL
421143	2013 RP_{22}	—	September 12, 2002	Palomar	NEAT	EOS	2.3 km	MPC · JPL
421144	2013 RT_{24}	—	October 10, 2008	Mount Lemmon	Mount Lemmon Survey	·	2.4 km	MPC · JPL
421145	2013 RP_{26}	—	April 6, 2010	WISE	WISE	·	2.5 km	MPC · JPL
421146	2013 RL_{27}	—	September 11, 2001	Kitt Peak	Spacewatch	L5	8.8 km	MPC · JPL
421147	2013 RN_{28}	—	October 6, 2002	Palomar	NEAT	EOS	2.3 km	MPC · JPL
421148	2013 RP_{28}	—	September 11, 2007	Kitt Peak	Spacewatch	THM	2.4 km	MPC · JPL
421149	2013 RQ_{30}	—	June 26, 2007	Catalina	CSS	TIR	3.9 km	MPC · JPL
421150	2013 RD_{31}	—	September 30, 2005	Catalina	CSS	·	1.8 km	MPC · JPL
421151	2013 RG_{31}	—	August 22, 2004	Kitt Peak	Spacewatch	·	1.9 km	MPC · JPL
421152	2013 RZ_{31}	—	March 16, 2002	Socorro	LINEAR	DOR	3.1 km	MPC · JPL
421153	2013 RB_{32}	—	April 8, 2006	Kitt Peak	Spacewatch	·	2.9 km	MPC · JPL
421154	2013 RQ_{33}	—	September 20, 2003	Socorro	LINEAR	·	1.1 km	MPC · JPL
421155	2013 RQ_{35}	—	September 19, 2003	Kitt Peak	Spacewatch	EOS	2.6 km	MPC · JPL
421156	2013 RW_{35}	—	July 13, 2004	Siding Spring	SSS	·	2.3 km	MPC · JPL
421157	2013 RL_{40}	—	November 3, 2010	Mount Lemmon	Mount Lemmon Survey	·	820 m	MPC · JPL
421158	2013 RX_{40}	—	October 6, 1996	Kitt Peak	Spacewatch	·	4.1 km	MPC · JPL
421159	2013 RC_{42}	—	October 22, 2008	Kitt Peak	Spacewatch	·	3.0 km	MPC · JPL
421160	2013 RU_{42}	—	October 9, 2008	Kitt Peak	Spacewatch	VER	2.4 km	MPC · JPL
421161	2013 RV_{42}	—	March 30, 2010	WISE	WISE	·	3.7 km	MPC · JPL
421162	2013 RA_{43}	—	April 14, 2007	Mount Lemmon	Mount Lemmon Survey	·	2.6 km	MPC · JPL
421163	2013 RB_{44}	—	September 12, 2002	Palomar	NEAT	EOS	2.2 km	MPC · JPL
421164	2013 RG_{44}	—	January 11, 2003	Kitt Peak	Spacewatch	·	1.6 km	MPC · JPL
421165	2013 RL_{44}	—	October 3, 2002	Palomar	NEAT	·	4.7 km	MPC · JPL
421166	2013 RS_{44}	—	December 19, 2003	Kitt Peak	Spacewatch	·	3.7 km	MPC · JPL
421167	2013 RV_{44}	—	September 5, 2008	Kitt Peak	Spacewatch	EOS	2.1 km	MPC · JPL
421168	2013 RY_{44}	—	December 15, 2006	Mount Lemmon	Mount Lemmon Survey	L5	10 km	MPC · JPL
421169	2013 RZ_{44}	—	December 28, 2003	Kitt Peak	Spacewatch	·	3.5 km	MPC · JPL
421170	2013 RO_{45}	—	August 19, 2006	Kitt Peak	Spacewatch	CYB	5.0 km	MPC · JPL
421171	2013 RW_{47}	—	February 8, 2008	Kitt Peak	Spacewatch	·	1.3 km	MPC · JPL
421172	2013 RS_{50}	—	December 21, 2005	Kitt Peak	Spacewatch	WIT	1.1 km	MPC · JPL
421173	2013 RD_{52}	—	September 21, 2001	Socorro	LINEAR	·	1.3 km	MPC · JPL
421174	2013 RU_{53}	—	March 8, 2005	Mount Lemmon	Mount Lemmon Survey	EOS	2.1 km	MPC · JPL
421175	2013 RK_{54}	—	June 19, 2009	Kitt Peak	Spacewatch	V	810 m	MPC · JPL
421176	2013 RN_{54}	—	September 30, 1997	Kitt Peak	Spacewatch	·	3.1 km	MPC · JPL
421177	2013 RQ_{54}	—	March 14, 2011	Mount Lemmon	Mount Lemmon Survey	·	2.7 km	MPC · JPL
421178	2013 RT_{54}	—	September 28, 2008	Mount Lemmon	Mount Lemmon Survey	·	3.1 km	MPC · JPL
421179	2013 RW_{58}	—	September 19, 2003	Kitt Peak	Spacewatch	EOS	2.0 km	MPC · JPL
421180	2013 RX_{59}	—	August 19, 2006	Kitt Peak	Spacewatch	·	810 m	MPC · JPL
421181	2013 RW_{63}	—	April 2, 2005	Mount Lemmon	Mount Lemmon Survey	·	750 m	MPC · JPL
421182	2013 RP_{66}	—	March 11, 2007	Mount Lemmon	Mount Lemmon Survey	MAR	1.0 km	MPC · JPL
421183	2013 RK_{68}	—	November 22, 2008	Socorro	LINEAR	TIR	6.1 km	MPC · JPL
421184	2013 RR_{68}	—	February 12, 2002	Palomar	NEAT	·	2.6 km	MPC · JPL
421185	2013 RF_{70}	—	September 1, 2005	Kitt Peak	Spacewatch	·	1.3 km	MPC · JPL
421186	2013 RY_{72}	—	February 16, 2010	Kitt Peak	Spacewatch	·	2.7 km	MPC · JPL
421187	2013 RN_{74}	—	March 9, 2007	Kitt Peak	Spacewatch	·	2.2 km	MPC · JPL
421188	2013 RO_{74}	—	September 24, 2008	Mount Lemmon	Mount Lemmon Survey	·	2.2 km	MPC · JPL
421189	2013 RX_{74}	—	January 30, 2004	Kitt Peak	Spacewatch	·	1.3 km	MPC · JPL
421190	2013 RA_{75}	—	April 10, 2005	Mount Lemmon	Mount Lemmon Survey	·	3.5 km	MPC · JPL
421191	2013 RL_{75}	—	September 13, 2002	Palomar	NEAT	·	3.3 km	MPC · JPL
421192	2013 RU_{75}	—	September 28, 2008	Mount Lemmon	Mount Lemmon Survey	HYG	3.2 km	MPC · JPL
421193	2013 RS_{76}	—	November 4, 2004	Kitt Peak	Spacewatch	KOR	1.4 km	MPC · JPL
421194	2013 RT_{77}	—	January 27, 2006	Mount Lemmon	Mount Lemmon Survey	·	2.0 km	MPC · JPL
421195	2013 RO_{83}	—	November 23, 2009	Mount Lemmon	Mount Lemmon Survey	·	2.0 km	MPC · JPL
421196	2013 RQ_{83}	—	September 13, 2004	Socorro	LINEAR	·	2.2 km	MPC · JPL
421197	2013 RR_{83}	—	November 11, 2004	Kitt Peak	Spacewatch	·	2.4 km	MPC · JPL
421198	2013 RC_{86}	—	January 16, 2010	Mount Lemmon	Mount Lemmon Survey	EOS	1.9 km	MPC · JPL
421199	2013 RW_{87}	—	February 6, 2007	Kitt Peak	Spacewatch	·	1.6 km	MPC · JPL
421200	2013 RO_{89}	—	March 11, 2005	Mount Lemmon	Mount Lemmon Survey	·	3.2 km	MPC · JPL

== 421201–421300 ==
back to top

Designation			Discovery			Properties		Ref
Permanent	Provisional	Named after	Date	Site	Discoverer(s)	Category	Diam.	Ref
421201	2013 RE_{90}	—	April 10, 2010	WISE	WISE	·	2.6 km	MPC · JPL
421202	2013 RO_{90}	—	September 26, 2006	Kitt Peak	Spacewatch	·	1.2 km	MPC · JPL
421203	2013 RK_{91}	—	January 13, 2011	Kitt Peak	Spacewatch	·	1.5 km	MPC · JPL
421204	2013 RQ_{92}	—	August 23, 2007	Kitt Peak	Spacewatch	·	2.9 km	MPC · JPL
421205	2013 RX_{96}	—	October 16, 2003	Kitt Peak	Spacewatch	·	2.1 km	MPC · JPL
421206	2013 SR_{14}	—	September 22, 2003	Kitt Peak	Spacewatch	·	1.3 km	MPC · JPL
421207	2013 SW_{15}	—	February 12, 2004	Kitt Peak	Spacewatch	·	1.6 km	MPC · JPL
421208	2013 SX_{15}	—	January 19, 2004	Anderson Mesa	LONEOS	·	3.5 km	MPC · JPL
421209	2013 SS_{21}	—	May 20, 2006	Siding Spring	SSS	·	6.0 km	MPC · JPL
421210	2013 SF_{22}	—	April 19, 2007	Kitt Peak	Spacewatch	·	2.5 km	MPC · JPL
421211	2013 SA_{23}	—	March 4, 2005	Catalina	CSS	·	3.7 km	MPC · JPL
421212	2013 SR_{25}	—	March 2, 2006	Kitt Peak	Spacewatch	·	1.9 km	MPC · JPL
421213	2013 SU_{26}	—	February 9, 2008	Mount Lemmon	Mount Lemmon Survey	·	1.2 km	MPC · JPL
421214	2013 SZ_{26}	—	September 29, 2008	Mount Lemmon	Mount Lemmon Survey	·	2.4 km	MPC · JPL
421215	2013 SF_{27}	—	March 25, 2006	Kitt Peak	Spacewatch	·	3.5 km	MPC · JPL
421216	2013 SJ_{27}	—	September 5, 2007	Mount Lemmon	Mount Lemmon Survey	HYG	3.1 km	MPC · JPL
421217	2013 SS_{30}	—	January 28, 2006	Kitt Peak	Spacewatch	·	2.7 km	MPC · JPL
421218	2013 SF_{31}	—	September 13, 2007	Mount Lemmon	Mount Lemmon Survey	CYB	3.6 km	MPC · JPL
421219	2013 SH_{31}	—	October 4, 2004	Palomar	NEAT	·	2.6 km	MPC · JPL
421220	2013 SP_{31}	—	November 1, 2005	Mount Lemmon	Mount Lemmon Survey	·	1.7 km	MPC · JPL
421221	2013 SC_{35}	—	November 21, 2008	Mount Lemmon	Mount Lemmon Survey	THM	2.8 km	MPC · JPL
421222	2013 SD_{35}	—	March 4, 2005	Mount Lemmon	Mount Lemmon Survey	EOS	1.9 km	MPC · JPL
421223	2013 SQ_{35}	—	September 11, 2004	Kitt Peak	Spacewatch	·	1.9 km	MPC · JPL
421224	2013 SH_{37}	—	November 30, 1999	Kitt Peak	Spacewatch	KOR	1.5 km	MPC · JPL
421225	2013 SR_{37}	—	March 1, 2005	Kitt Peak	Spacewatch	·	3.5 km	MPC · JPL
421226	2013 SR_{38}	—	April 16, 2007	Mount Lemmon	Mount Lemmon Survey	·	1.6 km	MPC · JPL
421227	2013 SV_{39}	—	September 13, 2013	Mount Lemmon	Mount Lemmon Survey	·	2.7 km	MPC · JPL
421228	2013 SF_{40}	—	September 24, 2008	Kitt Peak	Spacewatch	EOS	2.2 km	MPC · JPL
421229	2013 SY_{40}	—	October 18, 2009	Mount Lemmon	Mount Lemmon Survey	MRX	1.3 km	MPC · JPL
421230	2013 SZ_{40}	—	January 13, 2002	Kitt Peak	Spacewatch	·	2.2 km	MPC · JPL
421231	2013 SE_{41}	—	October 29, 1999	Kitt Peak	Spacewatch	KOR	1.2 km	MPC · JPL
421232	2013 SQ_{41}	—	November 20, 2003	Socorro	LINEAR	PHO	1.4 km	MPC · JPL
421233	2013 SA_{42}	—	April 18, 2006	Kitt Peak	Spacewatch	KOR	1.7 km	MPC · JPL
421234	2013 SC_{42}	—	January 17, 2005	Kitt Peak	Spacewatch	·	3.5 km	MPC · JPL
421235	2013 SG_{42}	—	April 25, 2006	Kitt Peak	Spacewatch	(1298)	3.7 km	MPC · JPL
421236	2013 SK_{43}	—	April 19, 2007	Mount Lemmon	Mount Lemmon Survey	·	2.5 km	MPC · JPL
421237	2013 SL_{43}	—	September 30, 2009	Mount Lemmon	Mount Lemmon Survey	WIT	1.3 km	MPC · JPL
421238	2013 SV_{43}	—	November 26, 2005	Catalina	CSS	EUN	1.5 km	MPC · JPL
421239	2013 SZ_{45}	—	January 8, 1999	Kitt Peak	Spacewatch	·	1.5 km	MPC · JPL
421240	2013 SB_{46}	—	April 28, 2012	Mount Lemmon	Mount Lemmon Survey	·	2.7 km	MPC · JPL
421241	2013 SK_{47}	—	July 29, 2008	Mount Lemmon	Mount Lemmon Survey	·	1.7 km	MPC · JPL
421242	2013 SP_{47}	—	October 24, 2009	Kitt Peak	Spacewatch	·	1.6 km	MPC · JPL
421243	2013 SO_{48}	—	January 14, 2002	Kitt Peak	Spacewatch	·	2.2 km	MPC · JPL
421244	2013 SF_{49}	—	April 18, 2012	Mount Lemmon	Mount Lemmon Survey	·	1.3 km	MPC · JPL
421245	2013 SV_{51}	—	January 26, 2006	Kitt Peak	Spacewatch	AST	2.1 km	MPC · JPL
421246	2013 SW_{51}	—	January 18, 2004	Palomar	NEAT	·	3.2 km	MPC · JPL
421247	2013 SX_{51}	—	March 16, 2005	Catalina	CSS	·	3.8 km	MPC · JPL
421248	2013 SR_{52}	—	December 25, 2005	Kitt Peak	Spacewatch	·	1.6 km	MPC · JPL
421249	2013 SJ_{55}	—	November 9, 2009	Catalina	CSS	MAR	1.6 km	MPC · JPL
421250	2013 SC_{57}	—	November 3, 2008	Mount Lemmon	Mount Lemmon Survey	·	3.1 km	MPC · JPL
421251	2013 SX_{59}	—	March 3, 2005	Catalina	CSS	·	2.8 km	MPC · JPL
421252	2013 SY_{59}	—	March 10, 2007	Kitt Peak	Spacewatch	·	1.5 km	MPC · JPL
421253	2013 SM_{60}	—	August 15, 2004	Campo Imperatore	CINEOS	·	2.2 km	MPC · JPL
421254	2013 SN_{60}	—	September 6, 2008	Kitt Peak	Spacewatch	·	1.6 km	MPC · JPL
421255	2013 SV_{60}	—	October 5, 2002	Apache Point	SDSS	·	2.8 km	MPC · JPL
421256	2013 SW_{60}	—	April 18, 2007	Kitt Peak	Spacewatch	·	3.0 km	MPC · JPL
421257	2013 SP_{61}	—	April 20, 2007	Kitt Peak	Spacewatch	615	1.5 km	MPC · JPL
421258	2013 SY_{61}	—	January 31, 2006	Kitt Peak	Spacewatch	·	1.8 km	MPC · JPL
421259	2013 SE_{62}	—	April 5, 2008	Mount Lemmon	Mount Lemmon Survey	·	1.2 km	MPC · JPL
421260	2013 SJ_{63}	—	September 7, 2004	Kitt Peak	Spacewatch	·	1.9 km	MPC · JPL
421261	2013 SK_{63}	—	February 15, 2010	Mount Lemmon	Mount Lemmon Survey	·	3.0 km	MPC · JPL
421262	2013 SB_{65}	—	September 23, 2008	Kitt Peak	Spacewatch	·	3.1 km	MPC · JPL
421263	2013 SY_{66}	—	October 8, 2008	Mount Lemmon	Mount Lemmon Survey	·	2.9 km	MPC · JPL
421264	2013 SC_{67}	—	November 8, 2008	Mount Lemmon	Mount Lemmon Survey	·	1.9 km	MPC · JPL
421265	2013 SJ_{67}	—	September 14, 1999	Kitt Peak	Spacewatch	AST	1.8 km	MPC · JPL
421266	2013 SW_{67}	—	October 28, 2008	Kitt Peak	Spacewatch	·	3.0 km	MPC · JPL
421267	2013 SN_{68}	—	September 20, 2009	Kitt Peak	Spacewatch	·	2.5 km	MPC · JPL
421268	2013 SK_{69}	—	March 10, 2007	Mount Lemmon	Mount Lemmon Survey	·	1.8 km	MPC · JPL
421269	2013 SO_{69}	—	January 30, 2006	Kitt Peak	Spacewatch	·	2.8 km	MPC · JPL
421270	2013 SY_{69}	—	March 10, 2002	Kitt Peak	Spacewatch	AST	2.0 km	MPC · JPL
421271	2013 SA_{70}	—	March 6, 2011	Mount Lemmon	Mount Lemmon Survey	KOR	1.7 km	MPC · JPL
421272	2013 SV_{71}	—	June 9, 2007	Kitt Peak	Spacewatch	·	2.7 km	MPC · JPL
421273	2013 SL_{74}	—	December 30, 2005	Mount Lemmon	Mount Lemmon Survey	·	2.1 km	MPC · JPL
421274	2013 SF_{75}	—	September 4, 2002	Palomar	NEAT	·	3.0 km	MPC · JPL
421275	2013 SC_{76}	—	November 26, 2006	Kitt Peak	Spacewatch	·	1.4 km	MPC · JPL
421276	2013 SU_{78}	—	November 8, 2008	Mount Lemmon	Mount Lemmon Survey	·	4.0 km	MPC · JPL
421277	2013 SK_{79}	—	December 8, 2005	Kitt Peak	Spacewatch	EUN	1.5 km	MPC · JPL
421278	2013 SE_{81}	—	October 10, 2004	Kitt Peak	Spacewatch	·	1.9 km	MPC · JPL
421279	2013 SR_{82}	—	October 23, 2004	Kitt Peak	Spacewatch	AGN	1.4 km	MPC · JPL
421280	2013 SV_{83}	—	September 7, 2004	Kitt Peak	Spacewatch	·	2.4 km	MPC · JPL
421281	2013 SL_{84}	—	October 3, 2002	Palomar	NEAT	EOS	3.1 km	MPC · JPL
421282	2013 SR_{85}	—	March 31, 2008	Mount Lemmon	Mount Lemmon Survey	L5	10 km	MPC · JPL
421283	2013 TQ	—	December 20, 2001	Kitt Peak	Spacewatch	·	3.4 km	MPC · JPL
421284	2013 TR	—	January 6, 2010	Mount Lemmon	Mount Lemmon Survey	·	3.5 km	MPC · JPL
421285	2013 TY_{2}	—	February 20, 2002	Kitt Peak	Spacewatch	slow	2.3 km	MPC · JPL
421286	2013 TT_{6}	—	April 25, 2000	Kitt Peak	Spacewatch	·	3.5 km	MPC · JPL
421287	2013 TR_{7}	—	April 11, 2005	Mount Lemmon	Mount Lemmon Survey	·	3.5 km	MPC · JPL
421288	2013 TS_{7}	—	November 19, 2003	Kitt Peak	Spacewatch	EOS	2.3 km	MPC · JPL
421289	2013 TG_{8}	—	March 13, 1999	Kitt Peak	Spacewatch	·	1.5 km	MPC · JPL
421290	2013 TX_{8}	—	March 10, 2007	Mount Lemmon	Mount Lemmon Survey	·	2.1 km	MPC · JPL
421291	2013 TG_{9}	—	November 4, 2004	Catalina	CSS	·	2.5 km	MPC · JPL
421292	2013 TE_{11}	—	May 24, 2006	Kitt Peak	Spacewatch	·	2.7 km	MPC · JPL
421293	2013 TH_{11}	—	October 4, 2002	Apache Point	SDSS	·	3.6 km	MPC · JPL
421294	2013 TN_{11}	—	November 10, 2006	Kitt Peak	Spacewatch	·	1.6 km	MPC · JPL
421295	2013 TL_{12}	—	February 8, 2002	Kitt Peak	Spacewatch	·	1.9 km	MPC · JPL
421296	2013 TM_{13}	—	March 13, 2007	Kitt Peak	Spacewatch	·	2.0 km	MPC · JPL
421297	2013 TL_{14}	—	February 13, 2004	Kitt Peak	Spacewatch	·	4.4 km	MPC · JPL
421298	2013 TD_{17}	—	February 7, 2008	Mount Lemmon	Mount Lemmon Survey	·	1.2 km	MPC · JPL
421299	2013 TD_{18}	—	January 19, 2004	Kitt Peak	Spacewatch	·	2.9 km	MPC · JPL
421300	2013 TZ_{26}	—	September 29, 2008	Mount Lemmon	Mount Lemmon Survey	·	2.4 km	MPC · JPL

== 421301–421400 ==
back to top

Designation			Discovery			Properties		Ref
Permanent	Provisional	Named after	Date	Site	Discoverer(s)	Category	Diam.	Ref
421301	2013 TH_{27}	—	November 12, 1999	Kitt Peak	Spacewatch	KOR	1.2 km	MPC · JPL
421302	2013 TQ_{27}	—	November 3, 2008	Kitt Peak	Spacewatch	EOS	2.2 km	MPC · JPL
421303	2013 TL_{28}	—	March 25, 2006	Palomar	NEAT	·	4.0 km	MPC · JPL
421304	2013 TM_{31}	—	August 23, 2003	Palomar	NEAT	·	2.3 km	MPC · JPL
421305	2013 TX_{34}	—	February 17, 2010	Kitt Peak	Spacewatch	THM	2.6 km	MPC · JPL
421306	2013 TS_{36}	—	April 23, 2007	Kitt Peak	Spacewatch	GEF	1.6 km	MPC · JPL
421307	2013 TC_{37}	—	March 19, 2001	Kitt Peak	Spacewatch	·	2.5 km	MPC · JPL
421308	2013 TY_{39}	—	March 10, 2005	Mount Lemmon	Mount Lemmon Survey	·	2.8 km	MPC · JPL
421309	2013 TP_{40}	—	October 2, 2013	Mount Lemmon	Mount Lemmon Survey	VER	3.2 km	MPC · JPL
421310	2013 TA_{44}	—	September 23, 2009	Mount Lemmon	Mount Lemmon Survey	·	1.4 km	MPC · JPL
421311	2013 TX_{45}	—	April 22, 2007	Kitt Peak	Spacewatch	·	2.2 km	MPC · JPL
421312	2013 TJ_{49}	—	September 13, 2013	Mount Lemmon	Mount Lemmon Survey	L5	7.4 km	MPC · JPL
421313	2013 TL_{49}	—	October 28, 1997	Kitt Peak	Spacewatch	·	2.8 km	MPC · JPL
421314	2013 TF_{50}	—	October 21, 2007	Mount Lemmon	Mount Lemmon Survey	·	3.3 km	MPC · JPL
421315	2013 TY_{51}	—	August 25, 2005	Palomar	NEAT	3:2 · SHU	5.4 km	MPC · JPL
421316	2013 TP_{52}	—	September 5, 2000	Apache Point	SDSS	L5	10 km	MPC · JPL
421317	2013 TE_{54}	—	September 23, 2008	Kitt Peak	Spacewatch	·	2.0 km	MPC · JPL
421318	2013 TW_{58}	—	October 14, 2009	Catalina	CSS	·	2.3 km	MPC · JPL
421319	2013 TX_{62}	—	February 5, 2006	Mount Lemmon	Mount Lemmon Survey	·	1.8 km	MPC · JPL
421320	2013 TZ_{62}	—	October 4, 1997	Kitt Peak	Spacewatch	·	2.9 km	MPC · JPL
421321	2013 TA_{63}	—	July 19, 2004	Anderson Mesa	LONEOS	·	1.6 km	MPC · JPL
421322	2013 TP_{64}	—	October 10, 2008	Mount Lemmon	Mount Lemmon Survey	EOS	1.9 km	MPC · JPL
421323	2013 TK_{65}	—	March 4, 2005	Mount Lemmon	Mount Lemmon Survey	·	2.9 km	MPC · JPL
421324	2013 TO_{67}	—	February 10, 2011	Catalina	CSS	EOS	2.4 km	MPC · JPL
421325	2013 TZ_{70}	—	September 7, 2004	Socorro	LINEAR	·	2.5 km	MPC · JPL
421326	2013 TE_{71}	—	September 27, 2008	Mount Lemmon	Mount Lemmon Survey	·	2.7 km	MPC · JPL
421327	2013 TG_{71}	—	May 14, 2005	Mount Lemmon	Mount Lemmon Survey	·	1.0 km	MPC · JPL
421328	2013 TR_{71}	—	January 16, 2004	Kitt Peak	Spacewatch	THM	1.9 km	MPC · JPL
421329	2013 TV_{71}	—	April 20, 2007	Kitt Peak	Spacewatch	·	2.1 km	MPC · JPL
421330	2013 TW_{71}	—	February 12, 2000	Apache Point	SDSS	·	3.4 km	MPC · JPL
421331	2013 TL_{74}	—	May 3, 2006	Mount Lemmon	Mount Lemmon Survey	·	2.5 km	MPC · JPL
421332	2013 TZ_{75}	—	March 13, 2005	Catalina	CSS	·	1.0 km	MPC · JPL
421333	2013 TA_{79}	—	April 7, 2006	Mount Lemmon	Mount Lemmon Survey	·	2.6 km	MPC · JPL
421334	2013 TL_{80}	—	December 12, 2004	Kitt Peak	Spacewatch	KOR	1.6 km	MPC · JPL
421335	2013 TM_{84}	—	August 28, 2001	Kitt Peak	Spacewatch	·	3.6 km	MPC · JPL
421336	2013 TZ_{84}	—	September 11, 2007	Mount Lemmon	Mount Lemmon Survey	(8737)	3.6 km	MPC · JPL
421337	2013 TH_{85}	—	August 12, 2002	Socorro	LINEAR	·	4.4 km	MPC · JPL
421338	2013 TX_{87}	—	September 17, 2001	Kitt Peak	Spacewatch	L5	8.3 km	MPC · JPL
421339	2013 TT_{89}	—	January 4, 2006	Kitt Peak	Spacewatch	·	2.3 km	MPC · JPL
421340	2013 TW_{91}	—	March 21, 1999	Apache Point	SDSS	·	3.2 km	MPC · JPL
421341	2013 TV_{93}	—	April 10, 2002	Socorro	LINEAR	·	2.8 km	MPC · JPL
421342	2013 TU_{95}	—	July 19, 2007	Mount Lemmon	Mount Lemmon Survey	·	2.1 km	MPC · JPL
421343	2013 TC_{96}	—	October 12, 1996	Kitt Peak	Spacewatch	·	2.4 km	MPC · JPL
421344	2013 TD_{96}	—	December 3, 2008	Kitt Peak	Spacewatch	·	3.6 km	MPC · JPL
421345	2013 TW_{96}	—	March 4, 2005	Mount Lemmon	Mount Lemmon Survey	·	2.9 km	MPC · JPL
421346	2013 TY_{96}	—	October 10, 2008	Mount Lemmon	Mount Lemmon Survey	·	2.7 km	MPC · JPL
421347	2013 TB_{97}	—	April 11, 1994	Kitt Peak	Spacewatch	·	1.7 km	MPC · JPL
421348	2013 TY_{97}	—	January 30, 2006	Kitt Peak	Spacewatch	KOR	1.6 km	MPC · JPL
421349	2013 TC_{100}	—	September 9, 2004	Kitt Peak	Spacewatch	GEF	1.3 km	MPC · JPL
421350	2013 TH_{100}	—	February 9, 2002	Kitt Peak	Spacewatch	·	2.0 km	MPC · JPL
421351	2013 TW_{103}	—	September 28, 2002	Palomar	NEAT	·	2.9 km	MPC · JPL
421352	2013 TA_{104}	—	October 5, 1996	Kitt Peak	Spacewatch	·	3.1 km	MPC · JPL
421353	2013 TD_{105}	—	September 18, 2003	Kitt Peak	Spacewatch	NAE	2.2 km	MPC · JPL
421354	2013 TQ_{106}	—	October 5, 2004	Kitt Peak	Spacewatch	·	1.9 km	MPC · JPL
421355	2013 TM_{108}	—	October 24, 2008	Kitt Peak	Spacewatch	·	2.6 km	MPC · JPL
421356	2013 TQ_{108}	—	November 3, 2007	Catalina	CSS	CYB	3.7 km	MPC · JPL
421357	2013 TP_{110}	—	November 14, 2002	Palomar	NEAT	TIR	3.6 km	MPC · JPL
421358	2013 TJ_{111}	—	May 13, 2010	WISE	WISE	·	3.8 km	MPC · JPL
421359	2013 TF_{113}	—	October 20, 2008	Kitt Peak	Spacewatch	·	3.2 km	MPC · JPL
421360	2013 TR_{114}	—	November 2, 2008	Mount Lemmon	Mount Lemmon Survey	·	2.5 km	MPC · JPL
421361	2013 TE_{115}	—	February 17, 2004	Catalina	CSS	EOS	2.7 km	MPC · JPL
421362	2013 TF_{128}	—	November 3, 2004	Kitt Peak	Spacewatch	·	2.7 km	MPC · JPL
421363	2013 TU_{128}	—	December 19, 2009	Mayhill	Smirnov, A.	·	2.6 km	MPC · JPL
421364	2013 TY_{128}	—	August 23, 2004	Kitt Peak	Spacewatch	·	1.7 km	MPC · JPL
421365	2013 TE_{129}	—	February 25, 2006	Kitt Peak	Spacewatch	L5	8.3 km	MPC · JPL
421366	2013 TH_{129}	—	April 19, 2006	Kitt Peak	Spacewatch	·	3.4 km	MPC · JPL
421367	2013 TO_{129}	—	October 23, 2009	Mount Lemmon	Mount Lemmon Survey	EUN	1.8 km	MPC · JPL
421368	2013 TD_{130}	—	October 27, 2005	Mount Lemmon	Mount Lemmon Survey	·	2.2 km	MPC · JPL
421369	2013 TG_{130}	—	April 28, 2000	Kitt Peak	Spacewatch	·	3.4 km	MPC · JPL
421370	2013 TL_{130}	—	October 26, 2008	Kitt Peak	Spacewatch	·	3.5 km	MPC · JPL
421371	2013 TU_{130}	—	June 8, 2005	Kitt Peak	Spacewatch	·	5.0 km	MPC · JPL
421372	2013 TD_{133}	—	May 7, 2006	Mount Lemmon	Mount Lemmon Survey	·	3.3 km	MPC · JPL
421373	2013 TA_{134}	—	October 30, 2008	Kitt Peak	Spacewatch	·	2.7 km	MPC · JPL
421374	2013 TH_{136}	—	May 25, 2007	Mount Lemmon	Mount Lemmon Survey	·	2.5 km	MPC · JPL
421375	2013 TX_{136}	—	August 14, 2001	Haleakala	NEAT	·	3.7 km	MPC · JPL
421376	2013 TK_{137}	—	May 5, 2008	Mount Lemmon	Mount Lemmon Survey	V	890 m	MPC · JPL
421377	2013 TM_{137}	—	September 20, 2003	Palomar	NEAT	NAE	2.6 km	MPC · JPL
421378	2013 TY_{137}	—	September 10, 2007	Catalina	CSS	EOS	2.2 km	MPC · JPL
421379	2013 TK_{140}	—	September 14, 2002	Haleakala	NEAT	·	3.3 km	MPC · JPL
421380	2013 TG_{144}	—	November 17, 2008	Kitt Peak	Spacewatch	·	3.1 km	MPC · JPL
421381	2013 TW_{147}	—	December 30, 2005	Kitt Peak	Spacewatch	·	1.5 km	MPC · JPL
421382	2013 UE_{4}	—	April 6, 2008	Mount Lemmon	Mount Lemmon Survey	L5	10 km	MPC · JPL
421383	2013 US_{5}	—	September 11, 2004	Palomar	NEAT	·	2.1 km	MPC · JPL
421384	2013 UD_{6}	—	August 24, 2008	Kitt Peak	Spacewatch	·	2.3 km	MPC · JPL
421385	2013 UO_{6}	—	September 12, 2002	Palomar	NEAT	·	3.1 km	MPC · JPL
421386	2013 UP_{6}	—	January 23, 2006	Kitt Peak	Spacewatch	·	2.7 km	MPC · JPL
421387	2013 UX_{6}	—	October 10, 2007	Catalina	CSS	·	4.3 km	MPC · JPL
421388	2013 UM_{11}	—	September 11, 2007	XuYi	PMO NEO Survey Program	·	3.7 km	MPC · JPL
421389	2013 UM_{12}	—	August 23, 2008	Siding Spring	SSS	·	3.4 km	MPC · JPL
421390	2013 UF_{13}	—	October 8, 2004	Kitt Peak	Spacewatch	·	2.6 km	MPC · JPL
421391	2013 UX_{13}	—	December 1, 2004	Catalina	CSS	·	3.3 km	MPC · JPL
421392	2013 US_{14}	—	November 17, 2004	Campo Imperatore	CINEOS	·	2.5 km	MPC · JPL
421393	2013 VD	—	January 19, 2005	Kitt Peak	Spacewatch	L5	10 km	MPC · JPL
421394	2013 VH_{3}	—	April 14, 2005	Kitt Peak	Spacewatch	·	4.2 km	MPC · JPL
421395	2013 VO_{3}	—	September 7, 2004	Kitt Peak	Spacewatch	·	2.0 km	MPC · JPL
421396	2013 VY_{5}	—	January 20, 2009	Mount Lemmon	Mount Lemmon Survey	·	4.3 km	MPC · JPL
421397	2013 VS_{6}	—	March 9, 2005	Mount Lemmon	Mount Lemmon Survey	·	3.9 km	MPC · JPL
421398	2013 VK_{7}	—	January 28, 2006	Mount Lemmon	Mount Lemmon Survey	·	2.6 km	MPC · JPL
421399	2013 VY_{10}	—	April 10, 2005	Kitt Peak	Spacewatch	·	3.9 km	MPC · JPL
421400	2013 VD_{14}	—	September 28, 2001	Palomar	NEAT	L5	10 km	MPC · JPL

== 421401–421500 ==
back to top

Designation			Discovery			Properties		Ref
Permanent	Provisional	Named after	Date	Site	Discoverer(s)	Category	Diam.	Ref
421401	2013 VG_{14}	—	January 22, 1998	Kitt Peak	Spacewatch	·	4.0 km	MPC · JPL
421402	2013 VY_{14}	—	October 15, 2007	Mount Lemmon	Mount Lemmon Survey	·	2.7 km	MPC · JPL
421403	2013 VB_{16}	—	November 3, 1991	Kitt Peak	Spacewatch	EOS	3.0 km	MPC · JPL
421404	2013 VH_{16}	—	May 29, 2008	Mount Lemmon	Mount Lemmon Survey	·	2.3 km	MPC · JPL
421405	2013 VT_{18}	—	October 8, 2007	Catalina	CSS	VER	3.7 km	MPC · JPL
421406	2013 VS_{19}	—	April 6, 2005	Kitt Peak	Spacewatch	·	3.4 km	MPC · JPL
421407	2013 VA_{21}	—	October 15, 2007	Anderson Mesa	LONEOS	·	5.9 km	MPC · JPL
421408	2013 VG_{21}	—	July 1, 1998	Kitt Peak	Spacewatch	GEF	1.9 km	MPC · JPL
421409	2013 VD_{23}	—	September 11, 2004	Socorro	LINEAR	ADE	3.0 km	MPC · JPL
421410	2013 VE_{23}	—	January 16, 2004	Kitt Peak	Spacewatch	·	4.0 km	MPC · JPL
421411	2013 WF_{1}	—	November 19, 2008	Mount Lemmon	Mount Lemmon Survey	·	2.9 km	MPC · JPL
421412	2013 WN_{5}	—	October 10, 2007	Catalina	CSS	·	3.9 km	MPC · JPL
421413	2013 WY_{14}	—	October 10, 2007	Catalina	CSS	EOS	2.6 km	MPC · JPL
421414	2013 WP_{21}	—	January 17, 2007	Catalina	CSS	T_{j} (2.95) · 3:2	6.6 km	MPC · JPL
421415	2013 WH_{35}	—	December 28, 2003	Socorro	LINEAR	·	3.9 km	MPC · JPL
421416	2013 WQ_{48}	—	March 17, 2005	Mount Lemmon	Mount Lemmon Survey	EOS	2.2 km	MPC · JPL
421417	2013 WN_{50}	—	October 15, 2007	Mount Lemmon	Mount Lemmon Survey	·	3.1 km	MPC · JPL
421418	2013 WG_{51}	—	June 1, 2010	WISE	WISE	·	6.2 km	MPC · JPL
421419	2013 WL_{54}	—	October 2, 1997	Caussols	ODAS	·	5.3 km	MPC · JPL
421420	2013 WS_{54}	—	February 14, 2004	Kitt Peak	Spacewatch	·	6.2 km	MPC · JPL
421421	2013 WM_{86}	—	March 18, 2005	Catalina	CSS	EOS	3.0 km	MPC · JPL
421422	2013 WO_{90}	—	March 14, 2007	Mount Lemmon	Mount Lemmon Survey	·	2.1 km	MPC · JPL
421423	2013 WQ_{91}	—	November 2, 2007	Kitt Peak	Spacewatch	VER	3.4 km	MPC · JPL
421424	2013 WS_{98}	—	August 9, 2000	Kitt Peak	Spacewatch	·	4.0 km	MPC · JPL
421425	2013 WP_{108}	—	September 14, 2007	Catalina	CSS	·	2.8 km	MPC · JPL
421426	2013 WX_{109}	—	November 20, 2008	Kitt Peak	Spacewatch	EOS	2.0 km	MPC · JPL
421427	2013 YM	—	January 23, 2006	Kitt Peak	Spacewatch	·	2.7 km	MPC · JPL
421428	2014 AR_{3}	—	March 4, 2006	Mount Lemmon	Mount Lemmon Survey	·	1.1 km	MPC · JPL
421429	2014 AK_{52}	—	September 28, 2003	Kitt Peak	Spacewatch	ADE	3.9 km	MPC · JPL
421430	2014 BN_{51}	—	May 11, 2010	Mount Lemmon	Mount Lemmon Survey	·	4.2 km	MPC · JPL
421431	2014 CU_{22}	—	February 2, 2005	Catalina	CSS	JUN	1.2 km	MPC · JPL
421432	2014 DE_{13}	—	November 30, 2003	Kitt Peak	Spacewatch	·	2.0 km	MPC · JPL
421433	2014 DR_{13}	—	January 13, 2008	Mount Lemmon	Mount Lemmon Survey	·	5.4 km	MPC · JPL
421434	2014 DS_{119}	—	September 16, 2009	Kitt Peak	Spacewatch	L4	8.2 km	MPC · JPL
421435	2014 ED_{51}	—	September 11, 2004	Kitt Peak	Spacewatch	·	1.5 km	MPC · JPL
421436	2014 FH_{48}	—	March 7, 2003	Socorro	LINEAR	·	2.8 km	MPC · JPL
421437	2014 FP_{49}	—	August 23, 2003	Palomar	NEAT	·	1.5 km	MPC · JPL
421438	2014 FB_{50}	—	January 24, 2004	Socorro	LINEAR	·	3.0 km	MPC · JPL
421439	2014 KP_{8}	—	December 16, 1995	Kitt Peak	Spacewatch	·	1.4 km	MPC · JPL
421440	2014 KD_{77}	—	October 8, 2008	Mount Lemmon	Mount Lemmon Survey	·	1.2 km	MPC · JPL
421441	2014 KT_{97}	—	October 8, 2007	Catalina	CSS	·	1.4 km	MPC · JPL
421442	2014 MV_{16}	—	November 17, 2011	Mount Lemmon	Mount Lemmon Survey	·	800 m	MPC · JPL
421443	2014 MN_{17}	—	October 20, 2004	Catalina	CSS	·	800 m	MPC · JPL
421444	2014 MB_{21}	—	April 25, 2003	Kitt Peak	Spacewatch	MAS	600 m	MPC · JPL
421445	2014 MT_{22}	—	August 25, 2003	Cerro Tololo	Deep Ecliptic Survey	EOS	2.9 km	MPC · JPL
421446	2014 MV_{22}	—	January 23, 2006	Kitt Peak	Spacewatch	·	920 m	MPC · JPL
421447	2014 MB_{32}	—	July 28, 2005	Palomar	NEAT	·	2.0 km	MPC · JPL
421448	2014 MF_{38}	—	March 8, 2003	Kitt Peak	Spacewatch	·	2.1 km	MPC · JPL
421449	2014 MK_{43}	—	October 16, 2009	Catalina	CSS	EOS	2.5 km	MPC · JPL
421450	2014 MF_{55}	—	December 21, 2005	Kitt Peak	Spacewatch	·	1.6 km	MPC · JPL
421451	2014 MN_{61}	—	January 11, 2008	Kitt Peak	Spacewatch	·	2.2 km	MPC · JPL
421452	2014 MZ_{61}	—	January 18, 2012	Kitt Peak	Spacewatch	·	4.2 km	MPC · JPL
421453	2014 MO_{65}	—	April 13, 2004	Palomar	NEAT	·	2.8 km	MPC · JPL
421454	2014 NH_{6}	—	December 13, 2006	Mount Lemmon	Mount Lemmon Survey	·	2.4 km	MPC · JPL
421455	2014 NT_{7}	—	October 4, 2005	Mount Lemmon	Mount Lemmon Survey	KOR	1.4 km	MPC · JPL
421456	2014 NE_{16}	—	September 10, 2004	Socorro	LINEAR	·	1.9 km	MPC · JPL
421457	2014 NV_{21}	—	October 19, 1998	Caussols	ODAS	·	2.7 km	MPC · JPL
421458	2014 NH_{39}	—	December 12, 2004	Kitt Peak	Spacewatch	·	1.1 km	MPC · JPL
421459	2014 NW_{56}	—	April 16, 2007	Catalina	CSS	·	3.4 km	MPC · JPL
421460	2014 NM_{58}	—	August 27, 2005	Palomar	NEAT	·	1.5 km	MPC · JPL
421461	2014 NP_{59}	—	April 15, 2010	Mount Lemmon	Mount Lemmon Survey	NYS	950 m	MPC · JPL
421462	2014 NC_{63}	—	September 29, 2001	Palomar	NEAT	·	1.6 km	MPC · JPL
421463	2014 OE_{1}	—	November 30, 2003	Kitt Peak	Spacewatch	NYS	1.2 km	MPC · JPL
421464	2014 OV_{1}	—	October 7, 2004	Socorro	LINEAR	·	740 m	MPC · JPL
421465	2014 OW_{1}	—	September 16, 2003	Kitt Peak	Spacewatch	ERI	1.5 km	MPC · JPL
421466	2014 OC_{2}	—	August 11, 2007	Anderson Mesa	LONEOS	·	810 m	MPC · JPL
421467	2014 ON_{2}	—	September 15, 2010	Mount Lemmon	Mount Lemmon Survey	·	1.9 km	MPC · JPL
421468	2014 OF_{4}	—	April 20, 2010	Kitt Peak	Spacewatch	·	2.3 km	MPC · JPL
421469	2014 OU_{5}	—	January 1, 2008	Kitt Peak	Spacewatch	·	1.9 km	MPC · JPL
421470	2014 OW_{19}	—	September 7, 2004	Kitt Peak	Spacewatch	·	2.2 km	MPC · JPL
421471	2014 OU_{22}	—	December 18, 2007	Mount Lemmon	Mount Lemmon Survey	·	2.9 km	MPC · JPL
421472	2014 OL_{27}	—	September 2, 2010	Mount Lemmon	Mount Lemmon Survey	·	1.2 km	MPC · JPL
421473	2014 OH_{28}	—	December 8, 2010	Mount Lemmon	Mount Lemmon Survey	·	3.2 km	MPC · JPL
421474	2014 OD_{40}	—	November 1, 2006	Mount Lemmon	Mount Lemmon Survey	·	1.4 km	MPC · JPL
421475	2014 OL_{40}	—	January 28, 2006	Kitt Peak	Spacewatch	·	720 m	MPC · JPL
421476	2014 OC_{41}	—	May 14, 2008	Mount Lemmon	Mount Lemmon Survey	·	2.0 km	MPC · JPL
421477	2014 OW_{42}	—	January 8, 2006	Mount Lemmon	Mount Lemmon Survey	·	730 m	MPC · JPL
421478	2014 OS_{43}	—	September 12, 2007	Kitt Peak	Spacewatch	·	1.1 km	MPC · JPL
421479	2014 OZ_{43}	—	December 29, 2003	Kitt Peak	Spacewatch	·	1.6 km	MPC · JPL
421480	2014 OS_{44}	—	September 10, 2007	Kitt Peak	Spacewatch	NYS	1.2 km	MPC · JPL
421481	2014 OE_{48}	—	February 25, 2007	Kitt Peak	Spacewatch	THM	2.4 km	MPC · JPL
421482	2014 OB_{53}	—	October 11, 2007	Mount Lemmon	Mount Lemmon Survey	·	1.1 km	MPC · JPL
421483	2014 ON_{54}	—	December 18, 2004	Mount Lemmon	Mount Lemmon Survey	·	1.0 km	MPC · JPL
421484	2014 OW_{54}	—	January 30, 2004	Kitt Peak	Spacewatch	·	2.0 km	MPC · JPL
421485	2014 OZ_{55}	—	March 15, 2007	Kitt Peak	Spacewatch	·	2.6 km	MPC · JPL
421486	2014 OH_{56}	—	April 25, 2007	Mount Lemmon	Mount Lemmon Survey	·	3.4 km	MPC · JPL
421487	2014 OU_{58}	—	February 11, 2004	Palomar	NEAT	·	1.3 km	MPC · JPL
421488	2014 OE_{59}	—	August 30, 2005	Kitt Peak	Spacewatch	·	1.6 km	MPC · JPL
421489	2014 OQ_{59}	—	February 8, 2008	Kitt Peak	Spacewatch	·	1.5 km	MPC · JPL
421490	2014 OV_{60}	—	December 14, 2010	Mount Lemmon	Mount Lemmon Survey	·	3.4 km	MPC · JPL
421491	2014 OZ_{62}	—	March 16, 2002	Kitt Peak	Spacewatch	·	2.6 km	MPC · JPL
421492	2014 OE_{63}	—	March 11, 2005	Kitt Peak	Spacewatch	·	900 m	MPC · JPL
421493	2014 OA_{65}	—	December 14, 2006	Kitt Peak	Spacewatch	·	3.1 km	MPC · JPL
421494	2014 OC_{65}	—	February 1, 2012	Mount Lemmon	Mount Lemmon Survey	·	3.3 km	MPC · JPL
421495	2014 OD_{65}	—	December 15, 2006	Kitt Peak	Spacewatch	·	2.5 km	MPC · JPL
421496	2014 OO_{67}	—	January 31, 2006	Kitt Peak	Spacewatch	·	2.5 km	MPC · JPL
421497	2014 OO_{69}	—	December 18, 2007	Mount Lemmon	Mount Lemmon Survey	·	1.1 km	MPC · JPL
421498	2014 OY_{69}	—	April 6, 2002	Cerro Tololo	Deep Ecliptic Survey	NYS	1.1 km	MPC · JPL
421499	2014 OS_{71}	—	November 27, 2006	Kitt Peak	Spacewatch	AGN	1.3 km	MPC · JPL
421500	2014 OZ_{71}	—	November 8, 2007	Kitt Peak	Spacewatch	·	1.0 km	MPC · JPL

== 421501–421600 ==
back to top

Designation			Discovery			Properties		Ref
Permanent	Provisional	Named after	Date	Site	Discoverer(s)	Category	Diam.	Ref
421501	2014 OZ_{72}	—	March 24, 2006	Mount Lemmon	Mount Lemmon Survey	·	990 m	MPC · JPL
421502	2014 OD_{74}	—	April 30, 2008	Kitt Peak	Spacewatch	·	3.5 km	MPC · JPL
421503	2014 OV_{85}	—	April 8, 2010	Mount Lemmon	Mount Lemmon Survey	·	930 m	MPC · JPL
421504	2014 OT_{89}	—	June 19, 2007	Kitt Peak	Spacewatch	·	700 m	MPC · JPL
421505	2014 OV_{89}	—	January 17, 2004	Kitt Peak	Spacewatch	·	1.3 km	MPC · JPL
421506	2014 OF_{90}	—	January 9, 2006	Mount Lemmon	Mount Lemmon Survey	EOS	2.1 km	MPC · JPL
421507	2014 OO_{92}	—	September 26, 2008	Kitt Peak	Spacewatch	·	630 m	MPC · JPL
421508	2014 OZ_{92}	—	March 11, 2007	Kitt Peak	Spacewatch	·	1.9 km	MPC · JPL
421509	2014 OE_{95}	—	September 15, 2007	Anderson Mesa	LONEOS	·	640 m	MPC · JPL
421510	2014 OT_{98}	—	December 12, 2006	Mount Lemmon	Mount Lemmon Survey	·	2.1 km	MPC · JPL
421511	2014 OA_{101}	—	February 3, 2001	Kitt Peak	Spacewatch	·	4.0 km	MPC · JPL
421512	2014 OF_{101}	—	December 29, 2005	Kitt Peak	Spacewatch	·	1.4 km	MPC · JPL
421513	2014 OV_{101}	—	October 15, 2007	Mount Lemmon	Mount Lemmon Survey	·	1.2 km	MPC · JPL
421514	2014 OZ_{101}	—	January 10, 2006	Kitt Peak	Spacewatch	EOS	2.1 km	MPC · JPL
421515	2014 OP_{102}	—	October 22, 2006	Catalina	CSS	·	1.7 km	MPC · JPL
421516	2014 OH_{104}	—	December 28, 2005	Kitt Peak	Spacewatch	·	3.5 km	MPC · JPL
421517	2014 OJ_{106}	—	September 10, 2007	Kitt Peak	Spacewatch	·	860 m	MPC · JPL
421518	2014 OD_{108}	—	August 29, 2005	Palomar	NEAT	·	2.4 km	MPC · JPL
421519	2014 OC_{109}	—	March 4, 2010	Kitt Peak	Spacewatch	·	660 m	MPC · JPL
421520	2014 OH_{109}	—	December 18, 2007	Kitt Peak	Spacewatch	·	1.1 km	MPC · JPL
421521	2014 OC_{110}	—	December 14, 1993	Kitt Peak	Spacewatch	HYG	3.1 km	MPC · JPL
421522	2014 OK_{112}	—	January 1, 2008	Kitt Peak	Spacewatch	·	1.8 km	MPC · JPL
421523	2014 OO_{116}	—	February 20, 2009	Kitt Peak	Spacewatch	(5)	970 m	MPC · JPL
421524	2014 OS_{116}	—	April 25, 2006	Kitt Peak	Spacewatch	MAS	690 m	MPC · JPL
421525	2014 OS_{117}	—	August 19, 2009	Kitt Peak	Spacewatch	·	2.1 km	MPC · JPL
421526	2014 OX_{120}	—	February 13, 2002	Apache Point	SDSS	·	2.9 km	MPC · JPL
421527	2014 OT_{122}	—	January 7, 2006	Mount Lemmon	Mount Lemmon Survey	·	2.5 km	MPC · JPL
421528	2014 OQ_{129}	—	January 3, 2009	Mount Lemmon	Mount Lemmon Survey	·	1.8 km	MPC · JPL
421529	2014 OR_{130}	—	November 18, 2003	Kitt Peak	Spacewatch	·	1.5 km	MPC · JPL
421530	2014 OF_{133}	—	December 1, 2011	Mount Lemmon	Mount Lemmon Survey	MAR	1.0 km	MPC · JPL
421531	2014 OK_{135}	—	October 28, 2006	Catalina	CSS	·	1.7 km	MPC · JPL
421532	2014 OO_{138}	—	May 1, 2003	Kitt Peak	Spacewatch	·	810 m	MPC · JPL
421533	2014 OW_{146}	—	October 7, 2005	Mount Lemmon	Mount Lemmon Survey	KOR	1.2 km	MPC · JPL
421534	2014 OC_{154}	—	September 6, 2008	Mount Lemmon	Mount Lemmon Survey	·	590 m	MPC · JPL
421535	2014 OO_{154}	—	December 19, 2007	Mount Lemmon	Mount Lemmon Survey	·	1.6 km	MPC · JPL
421536	2014 OU_{156}	—	April 20, 2009	Kitt Peak	Spacewatch	·	2.2 km	MPC · JPL
421537	2014 OU_{165}	—	January 14, 2012	Kitt Peak	Spacewatch	·	2.3 km	MPC · JPL
421538	2014 OX_{165}	—	September 10, 2010	Kitt Peak	Spacewatch	·	2.3 km	MPC · JPL
421539	2014 ON_{166}	—	September 14, 2006	Catalina	CSS	·	1.5 km	MPC · JPL
421540	2014 OB_{168}	—	November 30, 2005	Mount Lemmon	Mount Lemmon Survey	·	3.1 km	MPC · JPL
421541	2014 OC_{171}	—	January 7, 2006	Kitt Peak	Spacewatch	·	3.2 km	MPC · JPL
421542	2014 OD_{172}	—	March 18, 2010	Kitt Peak	Spacewatch	·	620 m	MPC · JPL
421543	2014 OK_{177}	—	October 3, 2006	Mount Lemmon	Mount Lemmon Survey	WIT	1.1 km	MPC · JPL
421544	2014 OX_{177}	—	December 4, 2005	Kitt Peak	Spacewatch	·	790 m	MPC · JPL
421545	2014 OH_{179}	—	October 18, 2007	Kitt Peak	Spacewatch	V	610 m	MPC · JPL
421546	2014 OY_{180}	—	April 23, 1996	Kitt Peak	Spacewatch	VER	2.8 km	MPC · JPL
421547	2014 OV_{182}	—	April 15, 2005	Kitt Peak	Spacewatch	·	1.3 km	MPC · JPL
421548	2014 OD_{183}	—	July 5, 2005	Mount Lemmon	Mount Lemmon Survey	·	1.7 km	MPC · JPL
421549	2014 ON_{183}	—	September 4, 2007	Catalina	CSS	·	810 m	MPC · JPL
421550	2014 OA_{186}	—	September 28, 2009	Mount Lemmon	Mount Lemmon Survey	·	3.5 km	MPC · JPL
421551	2014 OT_{186}	—	September 13, 2004	Kitt Peak	Spacewatch	·	1.6 km	MPC · JPL
421552	2014 OB_{187}	—	October 27, 2003	Kitt Peak	Spacewatch	·	1.3 km	MPC · JPL
421553	2014 OS_{187}	—	September 29, 2003	Anderson Mesa	LONEOS	·	4.6 km	MPC · JPL
421554	2014 OT_{187}	—	October 4, 2003	Kitt Peak	Spacewatch	·	1.4 km	MPC · JPL
421555	2014 OK_{188}	—	November 1, 2010	Mount Lemmon	Mount Lemmon Survey	·	2.5 km	MPC · JPL
421556	2014 OM_{188}	—	March 16, 2007	Mount Lemmon	Mount Lemmon Survey	·	2.7 km	MPC · JPL
421557	2014 OA_{189}	—	February 25, 2006	Kitt Peak	Spacewatch	·	3.2 km	MPC · JPL
421558	2014 OK_{189}	—	September 17, 2003	Kitt Peak	Spacewatch	(159)	2.3 km	MPC · JPL
421559	2014 OT_{189}	—	October 20, 2001	Socorro	LINEAR	·	1.5 km	MPC · JPL
421560	2014 OW_{189}	—	October 21, 2003	Anderson Mesa	LONEOS	NYS	1.2 km	MPC · JPL
421561	2014 OA_{190}	—	January 23, 2006	Kitt Peak	Spacewatch	·	3.3 km	MPC · JPL
421562	2014 OO_{190}	—	October 24, 2003	Kitt Peak	Spacewatch	MAS	680 m	MPC · JPL
421563	2014 OQ_{190}	—	September 23, 2008	Kitt Peak	Spacewatch	CYB	4.1 km	MPC · JPL
421564	2014 OS_{190}	—	October 16, 2001	Cima Ekar	ADAS	·	1.8 km	MPC · JPL
421565	2014 OD_{191}	—	February 13, 2004	Kitt Peak	Spacewatch	·	1.7 km	MPC · JPL
421566	2014 OJ_{192}	—	January 11, 2008	Mount Lemmon	Mount Lemmon Survey	·	1.4 km	MPC · JPL
421567	2014 OQ_{192}	—	February 21, 2007	Kitt Peak	Spacewatch	KOR	1.6 km	MPC · JPL
421568	2014 OD_{193}	—	June 21, 2007	Mount Lemmon	Mount Lemmon Survey	·	700 m	MPC · JPL
421569	2014 OE_{193}	—	August 8, 2004	Palomar	NEAT	·	1.9 km	MPC · JPL
421570	2014 OF_{193}	—	March 10, 2008	Mount Lemmon	Mount Lemmon Survey	·	2.0 km	MPC · JPL
421571	2014 OL_{193}	—	October 27, 2005	Kitt Peak	Spacewatch	·	1.7 km	MPC · JPL
421572	2014 OP_{193}	—	September 20, 2009	Kitt Peak	Spacewatch	EOS	2.2 km	MPC · JPL
421573	2014 OR_{193}	—	September 1, 2005	Kitt Peak	Spacewatch	·	1.8 km	MPC · JPL
421574	2014 OV_{193}	—	March 25, 2006	Kitt Peak	Spacewatch	NYS	1.3 km	MPC · JPL
421575	2014 OA_{194}	—	October 28, 1997	Kitt Peak	Spacewatch	·	540 m	MPC · JPL
421576	2014 OL_{194}	—	June 18, 2010	Mount Lemmon	Mount Lemmon Survey	·	630 m	MPC · JPL
421577	2014 OR_{194}	—	October 16, 2009	Mount Lemmon	Mount Lemmon Survey	·	1.8 km	MPC · JPL
421578	2014 OV_{194}	—	July 29, 2008	Kitt Peak	Spacewatch	·	3.5 km	MPC · JPL
421579	2014 OF_{195}	—	June 29, 2005	Kitt Peak	Spacewatch	·	3.2 km	MPC · JPL
421580	2014 OH_{195}	—	February 21, 2007	Mount Lemmon	Mount Lemmon Survey	·	1.9 km	MPC · JPL
421581	2014 OW_{195}	—	March 8, 2005	Mount Lemmon	Mount Lemmon Survey	·	1.6 km	MPC · JPL
421582	2014 OA_{196}	—	August 29, 2005	Kitt Peak	Spacewatch	·	1.5 km	MPC · JPL
421583	2014 OU_{196}	—	September 30, 2003	Kitt Peak	Spacewatch	·	1.3 km	MPC · JPL
421584	2014 OR_{197}	—	July 30, 2008	Mount Lemmon	Mount Lemmon Survey	·	3.2 km	MPC · JPL
421585	2014 OC_{198}	—	March 31, 2008	Mount Lemmon	Mount Lemmon Survey	MRX	930 m	MPC · JPL
421586	2014 OG_{198}	—	November 6, 2010	Kitt Peak	Spacewatch	·	1.6 km	MPC · JPL
421587	2014 OT_{198}	—	December 5, 2010	Mount Lemmon	Mount Lemmon Survey	·	1.8 km	MPC · JPL
421588	2014 OS_{201}	—	December 3, 2010	Mount Lemmon	Mount Lemmon Survey	·	1.6 km	MPC · JPL
421589	2014 OY_{203}	—	October 2, 2003	Kitt Peak	Spacewatch	NYS	880 m	MPC · JPL
421590	2014 OX_{211}	—	August 31, 2005	Palomar	NEAT	·	2.0 km	MPC · JPL
421591	2014 OP_{212}	—	April 6, 2005	Kitt Peak	Spacewatch	·	2.0 km	MPC · JPL
421592	2014 OT_{213}	—	October 30, 2010	Catalina	CSS	615	1.8 km	MPC · JPL
421593	2014 OV_{215}	—	March 9, 2002	Kitt Peak	Spacewatch	·	1.2 km	MPC · JPL
421594	2014 OH_{221}	—	February 13, 2008	Kitt Peak	Spacewatch	·	1.5 km	MPC · JPL
421595	2014 OD_{223}	—	November 15, 2006	Mount Lemmon	Mount Lemmon Survey	·	2.4 km	MPC · JPL
421596	2014 OU_{223}	—	September 13, 2007	Mount Lemmon	Mount Lemmon Survey	·	1.1 km	MPC · JPL
421597	2014 OL_{227}	—	October 16, 2009	Mount Lemmon	Mount Lemmon Survey	·	3.1 km	MPC · JPL
421598	2014 OP_{228}	—	October 2, 1999	Kitt Peak	Spacewatch	NYS	1.4 km	MPC · JPL
421599	2014 OA_{229}	—	September 23, 2008	Mount Lemmon	Mount Lemmon Survey	THM	2.3 km	MPC · JPL
421600	2014 OE_{229}	—	March 29, 2004	Kitt Peak	Spacewatch	·	1.2 km	MPC · JPL

== 421601–421700 ==
back to top

Designation			Discovery			Properties		Ref
Permanent	Provisional	Named after	Date	Site	Discoverer(s)	Category	Diam.	Ref
421601	2014 OS_{229}	—	September 22, 2003	Anderson Mesa	LONEOS	(31811)	3.3 km	MPC · JPL
421602	2014 OV_{229}	—	January 30, 2004	Kitt Peak	Spacewatch	·	1.1 km	MPC · JPL
421603	2014 OW_{229}	—	January 17, 2007	Kitt Peak	Spacewatch	HOF	2.7 km	MPC · JPL
421604	2014 OD_{231}	—	February 7, 2003	Kitt Peak	Spacewatch	·	1.8 km	MPC · JPL
421605	2014 OG_{231}	—	October 31, 2010	Mount Lemmon	Mount Lemmon Survey	·	1.2 km	MPC · JPL
421606	2014 OA_{232}	—	February 3, 2008	Kitt Peak	Spacewatch	·	1.5 km	MPC · JPL
421607	2014 OX_{233}	—	October 29, 2008	Kitt Peak	Spacewatch	·	570 m	MPC · JPL
421608	2014 OA_{234}	—	September 28, 2008	Mount Lemmon	Mount Lemmon Survey	·	620 m	MPC · JPL
421609	2014 OS_{234}	—	October 3, 2003	Kitt Peak	Spacewatch	·	1.0 km	MPC · JPL
421610	2014 OQ_{238}	—	September 30, 2005	Mount Lemmon	Mount Lemmon Survey	KOR	1.5 km	MPC · JPL
421611	2014 OF_{241}	—	October 30, 2005	Kitt Peak	Spacewatch	·	1.5 km	MPC · JPL
421612	2014 OW_{241}	—	April 24, 2001	Kitt Peak	Spacewatch	·	1.2 km	MPC · JPL
421613	2014 OP_{243}	—	March 1, 2009	Kitt Peak	Spacewatch	·	1.1 km	MPC · JPL
421614	2014 OH_{244}	—	December 5, 1999	Kitt Peak	Spacewatch	VER	3.3 km	MPC · JPL
421615	2014 OO_{245}	—	February 11, 2004	Kitt Peak	Spacewatch	·	1.4 km	MPC · JPL
421616	2014 OX_{253}	—	January 23, 2006	Kitt Peak	Spacewatch	·	2.7 km	MPC · JPL
421617	2014 OK_{254}	—	October 10, 2010	Mount Lemmon	Mount Lemmon Survey	AGN	1.1 km	MPC · JPL
421618	2014 OX_{262}	—	March 13, 2002	Kitt Peak	Spacewatch	·	1.1 km	MPC · JPL
421619	2014 OV_{277}	—	November 21, 2007	Mount Lemmon	Mount Lemmon Survey	V	820 m	MPC · JPL
421620	2014 OQ_{285}	—	December 11, 2004	Kitt Peak	Spacewatch	VER	3.6 km	MPC · JPL
421621	2014 OH_{288}	—	March 11, 2008	Kitt Peak	Spacewatch	·	1.6 km	MPC · JPL
421622	2014 OV_{291}	—	March 16, 2007	Kitt Peak	Spacewatch	EOS	2.3 km	MPC · JPL
421623	2014 OW_{292}	—	August 10, 2007	Kitt Peak	Spacewatch	V	560 m	MPC · JPL
421624	2014 ON_{293}	—	October 25, 2005	Mount Lemmon	Mount Lemmon Survey	·	1.9 km	MPC · JPL
421625	2014 OK_{294}	—	November 21, 2006	Mount Lemmon	Mount Lemmon Survey	·	1.3 km	MPC · JPL
421626	2014 OJ_{295}	—	October 17, 2010	Mount Lemmon	Mount Lemmon Survey	·	1.7 km	MPC · JPL
421627	2014 OM_{295}	—	July 26, 2003	Palomar	NEAT	·	2.0 km	MPC · JPL
421628	2014 OO_{295}	—	November 11, 2001	Apache Point	SDSS	·	1.8 km	MPC · JPL
421629	2014 OZ_{295}	—	October 7, 1999	Kitt Peak	Spacewatch	·	1.3 km	MPC · JPL
421630	2014 OB_{296}	—	August 23, 2001	Kitt Peak	Spacewatch	·	1.4 km	MPC · JPL
421631	2014 ON_{296}	—	April 29, 2008	Mount Lemmon	Mount Lemmon Survey	KOR	1.5 km	MPC · JPL
421632	2014 ON_{297}	—	February 3, 2009	Kitt Peak	Spacewatch	·	1.1 km	MPC · JPL
421633	2014 OY_{297}	—	December 10, 2010	Mount Lemmon	Mount Lemmon Survey	·	2.5 km	MPC · JPL
421634	2014 OB_{298}	—	July 7, 2010	Kitt Peak	Spacewatch	·	1.2 km	MPC · JPL
421635	2014 OM_{298}	—	October 2, 2005	Mount Lemmon	Mount Lemmon Survey	AGN	1.2 km	MPC · JPL
421636	2014 OM_{299}	—	February 19, 2009	Kitt Peak	Spacewatch	EUN	1.2 km	MPC · JPL
421637	2014 OU_{302}	—	January 6, 2006	Kitt Peak	Spacewatch	EOS	1.7 km	MPC · JPL
421638	2014 OV_{302}	—	October 2, 2006	Mount Lemmon	Mount Lemmon Survey	·	1.3 km	MPC · JPL
421639	2014 OQ_{305}	—	January 23, 2006	Kitt Peak	Spacewatch	·	740 m	MPC · JPL
421640	2014 OS_{311}	—	November 20, 2007	Kitt Peak	Spacewatch	·	1.1 km	MPC · JPL
421641	2014 ON_{315}	—	August 10, 2007	Kitt Peak	Spacewatch	·	740 m	MPC · JPL
421642	2014 OH_{328}	—	January 7, 2006	Kitt Peak	Spacewatch	EOS	1.6 km	MPC · JPL
421643	2014 ON_{329}	—	November 13, 2007	Kitt Peak	Spacewatch	·	900 m	MPC · JPL
421644	2014 OW_{332}	—	November 16, 2010	Mount Lemmon	Mount Lemmon Survey	EOS	1.6 km	MPC · JPL
421645	2014 OZ_{334}	—	October 29, 2010	Mount Lemmon	Mount Lemmon Survey	·	1.9 km	MPC · JPL
421646	2014 OB_{335}	—	October 27, 2006	Kitt Peak	Spacewatch	·	1.4 km	MPC · JPL
421647	2014 OP_{336}	—	February 2, 2005	Kitt Peak	Spacewatch	·	940 m	MPC · JPL
421648	2014 OE_{337}	—	March 13, 2007	Kitt Peak	Spacewatch	·	710 m	MPC · JPL
421649	2014 OM_{337}	—	February 2, 2006	Mount Lemmon	Mount Lemmon Survey	(31811)	3.5 km	MPC · JPL
421650	2014 OG_{338}	—	December 15, 2006	Mount Lemmon	Mount Lemmon Survey	·	1.9 km	MPC · JPL
421651	2014 OY_{341}	—	September 28, 2003	Kitt Peak	Spacewatch	·	950 m	MPC · JPL
421652	2014 OQ_{343}	—	December 28, 2000	Kitt Peak	Spacewatch	·	3.4 km	MPC · JPL
421653	2014 OO_{349}	—	April 22, 2007	Kitt Peak	Spacewatch	·	2.9 km	MPC · JPL
421654	2014 OR_{355}	—	April 22, 2007	Mount Lemmon	Mount Lemmon Survey	·	600 m	MPC · JPL
421655	2014 OR_{356}	—	December 25, 2005	Kitt Peak	Spacewatch	·	580 m	MPC · JPL
421656	2014 OL_{357}	—	February 21, 2007	Mount Lemmon	Mount Lemmon Survey	·	1.6 km	MPC · JPL
421657	2014 OB_{363}	—	April 12, 2004	Kitt Peak	Spacewatch	·	1.7 km	MPC · JPL
421658	2014 OA_{364}	—	December 18, 2007	Mount Lemmon	Mount Lemmon Survey	·	2.6 km	MPC · JPL
421659	2014 OO_{364}	—	August 18, 2009	Kitt Peak	Spacewatch	·	3.3 km	MPC · JPL
421660	2014 OH_{366}	—	January 12, 2008	Kitt Peak	Spacewatch	·	1.4 km	MPC · JPL
421661	2014 OE_{372}	—	September 11, 2007	Kitt Peak	Spacewatch	·	820 m	MPC · JPL
421662	2014 OG_{374}	—	August 23, 2001	Kitt Peak	Spacewatch	·	1.3 km	MPC · JPL
421663	2014 OM_{374}	—	February 28, 2006	Catalina	CSS	EOS	2.8 km	MPC · JPL
421664	2014 OR_{374}	—	April 5, 2010	Kitt Peak	Spacewatch	·	1.3 km	MPC · JPL
421665	2014 OX_{374}	—	September 6, 1999	Kitt Peak	Spacewatch	·	2.0 km	MPC · JPL
421666	2014 OE_{375}	—	August 29, 2006	Kitt Peak	Spacewatch	·	1.2 km	MPC · JPL
421667	2014 OC_{376}	—	February 13, 2009	Mount Lemmon	Mount Lemmon Survey	·	1.2 km	MPC · JPL
421668	2014 OR_{376}	—	February 15, 2002	Cerro Tololo	Deep Lens Survey	·	1.1 km	MPC · JPL
421669	2014 OA_{377}	—	March 10, 2005	Mount Lemmon	Mount Lemmon Survey	·	1.4 km	MPC · JPL
421670	2014 OS_{377}	—	February 20, 2009	Kitt Peak	Spacewatch	·	1.2 km	MPC · JPL
421671	2014 OK_{378}	—	December 3, 2007	Kitt Peak	Spacewatch	NYS	1.7 km	MPC · JPL
421672	2014 OV_{378}	—	October 17, 2003	Kitt Peak	Spacewatch	·	1.3 km	MPC · JPL
421673	2014 OX_{378}	—	January 7, 2006	Kitt Peak	Spacewatch	EOS	1.8 km	MPC · JPL
421674	2014 OV_{380}	—	October 2, 2006	Mount Lemmon	Mount Lemmon Survey	·	1.9 km	MPC · JPL
421675	2014 OG_{383}	—	February 9, 2007	Catalina	CSS	EOS	2.2 km	MPC · JPL
421676	2014 OF_{384}	—	October 4, 2004	Kitt Peak	Spacewatch	EMA	3.6 km	MPC · JPL
421677	2014 OG_{384}	—	September 1, 2005	Palomar	NEAT	·	1.8 km	MPC · JPL
421678	2014 OP_{386}	—	October 21, 2007	Mount Lemmon	Mount Lemmon Survey	·	1.4 km	MPC · JPL
421679	2014 OU_{386}	—	August 26, 2002	Palomar	NEAT	·	1.2 km	MPC · JPL
421680	2014 OA_{387}	—	December 5, 2007	Mount Lemmon	Mount Lemmon Survey	·	1.2 km	MPC · JPL
421681	2014 OG_{387}	—	February 7, 2008	Kitt Peak	Spacewatch	·	1.6 km	MPC · JPL
421682	2014 OJ_{387}	—	October 14, 2001	Apache Point	SDSS	·	1.3 km	MPC · JPL
421683	2014 OF_{389}	—	July 8, 2010	Kitt Peak	Spacewatch	·	1.8 km	MPC · JPL
421684	2014 OG_{389}	—	September 13, 1998	Kitt Peak	Spacewatch	·	3.4 km	MPC · JPL
421685	2014 OG_{390}	—	September 17, 2009	Catalina	CSS	·	2.2 km	MPC · JPL
421686	2014 OE_{392}	—	October 16, 1977	Palomar	C. J. van Houten, I. van Houten-Groeneveld, T. Gehrels	·	1.3 km	MPC · JPL
421687	2014 OV_{392}	—	October 14, 2004	Anderson Mesa	LONEOS	·	2.5 km	MPC · JPL
421688	2014 OL_{393}	—	September 21, 2001	Anderson Mesa	LONEOS	·	2.5 km	MPC · JPL
421689	2014 PM	—	October 8, 2007	Catalina	CSS	·	1.4 km	MPC · JPL
421690	2014 PV	—	November 18, 2006	Mount Lemmon	Mount Lemmon Survey	·	1.5 km	MPC · JPL
421691	2014 PB_{1}	—	October 17, 2006	Kitt Peak	Spacewatch	·	1.5 km	MPC · JPL
421692	2014 PE_{2}	—	August 26, 2005	Palomar	NEAT	·	1.9 km	MPC · JPL
421693	2014 PM_{3}	—	March 31, 2008	Kitt Peak	Spacewatch	KOR	1.3 km	MPC · JPL
421694	2014 PN_{6}	—	January 20, 2009	Mount Lemmon	Mount Lemmon Survey	V	830 m	MPC · JPL
421695	2014 PV_{6}	—	April 6, 2008	Kitt Peak	Spacewatch	·	2.2 km	MPC · JPL
421696	2014 PC_{7}	—	September 30, 2006	Catalina	CSS	·	1.2 km	MPC · JPL
421697	2014 PN_{8}	—	September 25, 2006	Mount Lemmon	Mount Lemmon Survey	·	1.4 km	MPC · JPL
421698	2014 PN_{10}	—	April 11, 2005	Mount Lemmon	Mount Lemmon Survey	·	1.0 km	MPC · JPL
421699	2014 PT_{10}	—	September 9, 2007	Kitt Peak	Spacewatch	·	1.2 km	MPC · JPL
421700	2014 PU_{10}	—	February 13, 2007	Mount Lemmon	Mount Lemmon Survey	·	2.7 km	MPC · JPL

== 421701–421800 ==
back to top

Designation			Discovery			Properties		Ref
Permanent	Provisional	Named after	Date	Site	Discoverer(s)	Category	Diam.	Ref
421701	2014 PY_{10}	—	November 2, 2007	Kitt Peak	Spacewatch	·	1.6 km	MPC · JPL
421702	2014 PL_{11}	—	December 31, 2011	Mount Lemmon	Mount Lemmon Survey	·	1.7 km	MPC · JPL
421703	2014 PS_{12}	—	June 23, 2007	Kitt Peak	Spacewatch	·	610 m	MPC · JPL
421704	2014 PR_{14}	—	February 11, 2000	Kitt Peak	Spacewatch	VER	2.5 km	MPC · JPL
421705	2014 PF_{15}	—	September 4, 2003	Kitt Peak	Spacewatch	THM	2.1 km	MPC · JPL
421706	2014 PK_{17}	—	February 2, 2008	Mount Lemmon	Mount Lemmon Survey	·	1.2 km	MPC · JPL
421707	2014 PP_{21}	—	January 17, 2009	Kitt Peak	Spacewatch	·	1.3 km	MPC · JPL
421708	2014 PR_{21}	—	December 12, 1998	Kitt Peak	Spacewatch	·	2.8 km	MPC · JPL
421709	2014 PH_{22}	—	January 5, 2012	Kitt Peak	Spacewatch	·	1.4 km	MPC · JPL
421710	2014 PL_{22}	—	September 23, 2001	Kitt Peak	Spacewatch	(12739)	1.6 km	MPC · JPL
421711	2014 PK_{23}	—	August 31, 2005	Kitt Peak	Spacewatch	·	1.8 km	MPC · JPL
421712	2014 PD_{25}	—	January 17, 2009	Kitt Peak	Spacewatch	V	660 m	MPC · JPL
421713	2014 PF_{25}	—	July 3, 2005	Mount Lemmon	Mount Lemmon Survey	(12739)	1.4 km	MPC · JPL
421714	2014 PB_{26}	—	December 27, 2006	Mount Lemmon	Mount Lemmon Survey	·	2.3 km	MPC · JPL
421715	2014 PV_{26}	—	April 20, 2009	Mount Lemmon	Mount Lemmon Survey	·	1.0 km	MPC · JPL
421716	2014 PW_{26}	—	November 27, 2006	Kitt Peak	Spacewatch	·	2.0 km	MPC · JPL
421717	2014 PJ_{27}	—	September 7, 2004	Kitt Peak	Spacewatch	·	2.1 km	MPC · JPL
421718	2014 PF_{29}	—	October 1, 2005	Mount Lemmon	Mount Lemmon Survey	AST	1.8 km	MPC · JPL
421719	2014 PV_{30}	—	November 3, 2007	Mount Lemmon	Mount Lemmon Survey	·	1.6 km	MPC · JPL
421720	2014 PY_{30}	—	January 27, 2007	Kitt Peak	Spacewatch	·	1.4 km	MPC · JPL
421721	2014 PD_{32}	—	September 16, 2003	Kitt Peak	Spacewatch	·	890 m	MPC · JPL
421722	2014 PF_{32}	—	November 17, 2006	Kitt Peak	Spacewatch	·	1.4 km	MPC · JPL
421723	2014 PY_{33}	—	September 16, 2009	Kitt Peak	Spacewatch	·	3.2 km	MPC · JPL
421724	2014 PG_{34}	—	April 24, 2008	Mount Lemmon	Mount Lemmon Survey	·	2.1 km	MPC · JPL
421725	2014 PK_{34}	—	March 6, 2008	Mount Lemmon	Mount Lemmon Survey	·	1.8 km	MPC · JPL
421726	2014 PQ_{36}	—	August 12, 1999	Kitt Peak	Spacewatch	·	1.1 km	MPC · JPL
421727	2014 PV_{36}	—	May 7, 2010	Catalina	CSS	·	1.3 km	MPC · JPL
421728	2014 PO_{37}	—	October 23, 2006	Mount Lemmon	Mount Lemmon Survey	·	1.4 km	MPC · JPL
421729	2014 PP_{37}	—	May 8, 2005	Kitt Peak	Spacewatch	·	1.0 km	MPC · JPL
421730	2014 PS_{37}	—	December 22, 2008	Mount Lemmon	Mount Lemmon Survey	·	630 m	MPC · JPL
421731	2014 PU_{38}	—	June 22, 1995	Kitt Peak	Spacewatch	·	2.1 km	MPC · JPL
421732	2014 PA_{40}	—	October 31, 2010	Mount Lemmon	Mount Lemmon Survey	·	2.6 km	MPC · JPL
421733	2014 PB_{40}	—	February 24, 2008	Mount Lemmon	Mount Lemmon Survey	·	2.4 km	MPC · JPL
421734	2014 PK_{40}	—	November 30, 2005	Mount Lemmon	Mount Lemmon Survey	KOR	1.4 km	MPC · JPL
421735	2014 PO_{41}	—	October 10, 2008	Mount Lemmon	Mount Lemmon Survey	SYL · CYB	5.0 km	MPC · JPL
421736	2014 PP_{42}	—	August 27, 2006	Kitt Peak	Spacewatch	·	940 m	MPC · JPL
421737	2014 PR_{42}	—	September 28, 2009	Kitt Peak	Spacewatch	·	2.4 km	MPC · JPL
421738	2014 PW_{42}	—	September 16, 2006	Catalina	CSS	·	1.2 km	MPC · JPL
421739	2014 PK_{44}	—	October 7, 2005	Mount Lemmon	Mount Lemmon Survey	·	2.3 km	MPC · JPL
421740	2014 PJ_{45}	—	March 11, 2007	Kitt Peak	Spacewatch	·	1.9 km	MPC · JPL
421741	2014 PX_{45}	—	March 20, 2001	Kitt Peak	Spacewatch	·	2.9 km	MPC · JPL
421742	2014 PC_{46}	—	December 22, 2008	Kitt Peak	Spacewatch	·	640 m	MPC · JPL
421743	2014 PK_{48}	—	December 1, 2005	Kitt Peak	Spacewatch	·	2.1 km	MPC · JPL
421744	2014 PU_{49}	—	February 2, 2006	Kitt Peak	Spacewatch	·	2.7 km	MPC · JPL
421745	2014 PO_{50}	—	February 1, 2005	Kitt Peak	Spacewatch	·	1.5 km	MPC · JPL
421746	2014 PP_{50}	—	June 6, 2011	Mount Lemmon	Mount Lemmon Survey	H	490 m	MPC · JPL
421747	2014 PV_{51}	—	February 4, 2006	Kitt Peak	Spacewatch	·	820 m	MPC · JPL
421748	2014 PA_{52}	—	August 29, 2005	Anderson Mesa	LONEOS	·	2.0 km	MPC · JPL
421749	2014 PY_{52}	—	February 21, 2007	Mount Lemmon	Mount Lemmon Survey	·	2.1 km	MPC · JPL
421750	2014 PP_{53}	—	September 11, 2004	Kitt Peak	Spacewatch	·	2.1 km	MPC · JPL
421751	2014 PZ_{54}	—	September 18, 2001	Kitt Peak	Spacewatch	·	1.7 km	MPC · JPL
421752	2014 PT_{55}	—	August 17, 2009	Kitt Peak	Spacewatch	·	1.8 km	MPC · JPL
421753	2014 PW_{55}	—	September 27, 2009	Catalina	CSS	·	1.7 km	MPC · JPL
421754	2014 PC_{56}	—	September 29, 2009	Mount Lemmon	Mount Lemmon Survey	·	2.5 km	MPC · JPL
421755	2014 PF_{56}	—	October 20, 2003	Kitt Peak	Spacewatch	·	1.1 km	MPC · JPL
421756	2014 PK_{56}	—	August 26, 2005	Palomar	NEAT	·	2.0 km	MPC · JPL
421757	2014 PN_{56}	—	February 18, 2008	Mount Lemmon	Mount Lemmon Survey	·	2.2 km	MPC · JPL
421758	2014 PS_{56}	—	September 27, 2008	Mount Lemmon	Mount Lemmon Survey	·	830 m	MPC · JPL
421759	2014 PH_{57}	—	October 28, 2006	Catalina	CSS	·	1.9 km	MPC · JPL
421760	2014 PT_{57}	—	October 1, 2003	Kitt Peak	Spacewatch	LIX	2.4 km	MPC · JPL
421761	2014 PP_{64}	—	November 14, 1998	Kitt Peak	Spacewatch	·	1.0 km	MPC · JPL
421762	2014 PZ_{64}	—	September 30, 2006	Mount Lemmon	Mount Lemmon Survey	·	1.3 km	MPC · JPL
421763	2014 PQ_{65}	—	October 7, 2010	Catalina	CSS	·	1.7 km	MPC · JPL
421764	2014 PK_{66}	—	November 19, 2001	Anderson Mesa	LONEOS	·	1.9 km	MPC · JPL
421765	2014 PA_{69}	—	January 30, 2004	Kitt Peak	Spacewatch	·	1.2 km	MPC · JPL
421766	2014 PE_{69}	—	May 5, 2008	Mount Lemmon	Mount Lemmon Survey	·	2.6 km	MPC · JPL
421767	2014 PF_{70}	—	February 4, 2006	Mount Lemmon	Mount Lemmon Survey	·	3.0 km	MPC · JPL
421768	2014 QS	—	October 17, 2007	Mount Lemmon	Mount Lemmon Survey	·	1.3 km	MPC · JPL
421769	2014 QD_{1}	—	March 17, 2013	Mount Lemmon	Mount Lemmon Survey	·	810 m	MPC · JPL
421770	2014 QV_{1}	—	September 13, 2005	Catalina	CSS	·	2.6 km	MPC · JPL
421771	2014 QB_{2}	—	January 3, 2000	Socorro	LINEAR	·	1.9 km	MPC · JPL
421772	2014 QK_{3}	—	November 30, 2005	Anderson Mesa	LONEOS	·	2.6 km	MPC · JPL
421773	2014 QN_{10}	—	July 21, 2006	Mount Lemmon	Mount Lemmon Survey	MAR	1.3 km	MPC · JPL
421774 Jeffreyrose	2014 QM_{13}	Jeffreyrose	December 20, 2009	Mount Lemmon	Mount Lemmon Survey	EOS	2.7 km	MPC · JPL
421775	2014 QG_{18}	—	January 10, 2006	Mount Lemmon	Mount Lemmon Survey	·	4.8 km	MPC · JPL
421776	2014 QU_{19}	—	October 19, 2003	Kitt Peak	Spacewatch	·	3.7 km	MPC · JPL
421777	2014 QV_{19}	—	September 30, 2003	Kitt Peak	Spacewatch	·	1.6 km	MPC · JPL
421778	2014 QW_{21}	—	October 18, 2001	Palomar	NEAT	·	2.1 km	MPC · JPL
421779	2014 QX_{21}	—	December 6, 2005	Mount Lemmon	Mount Lemmon Survey	·	3.2 km	MPC · JPL
421780	2014 QC_{22}	—	March 13, 2007	Mount Lemmon	Mount Lemmon Survey	·	2.2 km	MPC · JPL
421781	2014 QG_{22}	—	August 14, 2004	Campo Imperatore	CINEOS	·	710 m	MPC · JPL
421782	2014 QK_{22}	—	October 27, 2005	Mount Lemmon	Mount Lemmon Survey	·	1.7 km	MPC · JPL
421783	2014 QA_{23}	—	October 14, 2009	Catalina	CSS	·	2.8 km	MPC · JPL
421784	2014 QL_{23}	—	September 17, 2003	Kitt Peak	Spacewatch	EOS	2.1 km	MPC · JPL
421785	2014 QP_{24}	—	September 17, 2009	Kitt Peak	Spacewatch	·	2.9 km	MPC · JPL
421786	2014 QQ_{24}	—	March 10, 2008	Kitt Peak	Spacewatch	·	1.7 km	MPC · JPL
421787	2014 QF_{25}	—	March 14, 2007	Kitt Peak	Spacewatch	·	2.2 km	MPC · JPL
421788	2014 QM_{25}	—	March 22, 2001	Kitt Peak	Spacewatch	·	3.8 km	MPC · JPL
421789	2014 QQ_{25}	—	October 9, 2010	Mount Lemmon	Mount Lemmon Survey	·	1.8 km	MPC · JPL
421790	2014 QY_{25}	—	October 19, 2003	Palomar	NEAT	·	3.9 km	MPC · JPL
421791	2014 QN_{27}	—	August 25, 2005	Campo Imperatore	CINEOS	·	1.8 km	MPC · JPL
421792	2014 QR_{27}	—	October 20, 2003	Palomar	NEAT	LIX	2.8 km	MPC · JPL
421793	2014 QA_{28}	—	February 26, 2004	Kitt Peak	Deep Ecliptic Survey	·	1.3 km	MPC · JPL
421794	2014 QC_{28}	—	May 4, 2006	Mount Lemmon	Mount Lemmon Survey	·	1.0 km	MPC · JPL
421795	2014 QJ_{29}	—	March 22, 2009	Mount Lemmon	Mount Lemmon Survey	·	1.1 km	MPC · JPL
421796	2014 QO_{29}	—	September 12, 2007	Catalina	CSS	·	1.1 km	MPC · JPL
421797	2014 QP_{29}	—	September 17, 2003	Kitt Peak	Spacewatch	·	2.6 km	MPC · JPL
421798	2014 QA_{30}	—	September 19, 1995	Kitt Peak	Spacewatch	·	1.8 km	MPC · JPL
421799	2014 QB_{30}	—	August 15, 2009	Kitt Peak	Spacewatch	·	1.9 km	MPC · JPL
421800	2014 QH_{30}	—	January 5, 2006	Mount Lemmon	Mount Lemmon Survey	·	2.2 km	MPC · JPL

== 421801–421900 ==
back to top

Designation			Discovery			Properties		Ref
Permanent	Provisional	Named after	Date	Site	Discoverer(s)	Category	Diam.	Ref
421801	2014 QM_{30}	—	April 24, 2007	Mount Lemmon	Mount Lemmon Survey	EOS	1.8 km	MPC · JPL
421802	2014 QJ_{34}	—	July 11, 2009	Kitt Peak	Spacewatch	·	2.4 km	MPC · JPL
421803	2014 QY_{35}	—	June 6, 2003	Kitt Peak	Spacewatch	·	1.6 km	MPC · JPL
421804	2014 QZ_{35}	—	May 16, 2005	Mount Lemmon	Mount Lemmon Survey	(5)	1.4 km	MPC · JPL
421805	2014 QS_{36}	—	August 30, 2005	Kitt Peak	Spacewatch	PAD	1.5 km	MPC · JPL
421806	2014 QT_{36}	—	February 13, 2008	Mount Lemmon	Mount Lemmon Survey	·	1.7 km	MPC · JPL
421807	2014 QV_{36}	—	August 20, 2009	Kitt Peak	Spacewatch	·	2.2 km	MPC · JPL
421808	2014 QB_{37}	—	February 21, 2007	Kitt Peak	Spacewatch	·	2.9 km	MPC · JPL
421809	2014 QG_{38}	—	July 5, 2003	Kitt Peak	Spacewatch	·	1.2 km	MPC · JPL
421810	2014 QN_{38}	—	August 30, 2005	Kitt Peak	Spacewatch	·	1.7 km	MPC · JPL
421811	2014 QO_{42}	—	December 27, 2005	Kitt Peak	Spacewatch	·	2.0 km	MPC · JPL
421812	2014 QQ_{47}	—	November 19, 2008	Mount Lemmon	Mount Lemmon Survey	·	830 m	MPC · JPL
421813	2014 QG_{50}	—	February 11, 2008	Mount Lemmon	Mount Lemmon Survey	·	1.6 km	MPC · JPL
421814	2014 QV_{50}	—	March 16, 2007	Kitt Peak	Spacewatch	·	3.2 km	MPC · JPL
421815	2014 QA_{52}	—	December 30, 2005	Kitt Peak	Spacewatch	EOS	2.3 km	MPC · JPL
421816	2014 QL_{53}	—	August 30, 2002	Kitt Peak	Spacewatch	·	1.2 km	MPC · JPL
421817	2014 QA_{55}	—	September 16, 2009	Mount Lemmon	Mount Lemmon Survey	·	3.5 km	MPC · JPL
421818	2014 QW_{64}	—	September 11, 1994	Kitt Peak	Spacewatch	·	900 m	MPC · JPL
421819	2014 QZ_{64}	—	February 13, 2002	Kitt Peak	Spacewatch	·	1.0 km	MPC · JPL
421820	2014 QX_{74}	—	November 20, 2004	Kitt Peak	Spacewatch	·	3.0 km	MPC · JPL
421821	2014 QB_{78}	—	January 10, 2006	Kitt Peak	Spacewatch	EOS	2.7 km	MPC · JPL
421822	2014 QA_{91}	—	July 23, 2003	Palomar	NEAT	·	3.2 km	MPC · JPL
421823	2014 QU_{92}	—	September 25, 2009	Catalina	CSS	·	3.7 km	MPC · JPL
421824	2014 QO_{93}	—	October 12, 2007	Mount Lemmon	Mount Lemmon Survey	·	1.4 km	MPC · JPL
421825	2014 QC_{94}	—	March 13, 2007	Kitt Peak	Spacewatch	·	2.9 km	MPC · JPL
421826	2014 QF_{101}	—	February 24, 2009	Kitt Peak	Spacewatch	·	1.3 km	MPC · JPL
421827	2014 QP_{104}	—	February 14, 2005	Kitt Peak	Spacewatch	·	1.2 km	MPC · JPL
421828	2014 QU_{106}	—	February 23, 2012	Mount Lemmon	Mount Lemmon Survey	·	2.9 km	MPC · JPL
421829	2014 QV_{113}	—	September 10, 2010	Kitt Peak	Spacewatch	·	1.7 km	MPC · JPL
421830	2014 QA_{114}	—	February 2, 2006	Kitt Peak	Spacewatch	·	2.9 km	MPC · JPL
421831	2014 QU_{114}	—	February 4, 2006	Mount Lemmon	Mount Lemmon Survey	·	2.8 km	MPC · JPL
421832	2014 QT_{116}	—	October 17, 2010	Mount Lemmon	Mount Lemmon Survey	EUN	1.3 km	MPC · JPL
421833	2014 QG_{117}	—	October 1, 2005	Kitt Peak	Spacewatch	AGN	1.2 km	MPC · JPL
421834	2014 QU_{117}	—	August 30, 2005	Campo Imperatore	CINEOS	·	1.7 km	MPC · JPL
421835	2014 QJ_{119}	—	December 26, 2005	Kitt Peak	Spacewatch	·	650 m	MPC · JPL
421836	2014 QQ_{119}	—	May 6, 2006	Mount Lemmon	Mount Lemmon Survey	·	1.2 km	MPC · JPL
421837	2014 QB_{120}	—	November 26, 2005	Kitt Peak	Spacewatch	KOR	1.2 km	MPC · JPL
421838	2014 QR_{120}	—	September 17, 2006	Kitt Peak	Spacewatch	(5)	1.2 km	MPC · JPL
421839	2014 QD_{121}	—	January 26, 2000	Kitt Peak	Spacewatch	·	670 m	MPC · JPL
421840	2014 QP_{121}	—	April 8, 2003	Kitt Peak	Spacewatch	·	580 m	MPC · JPL
421841	2014 QV_{121}	—	July 29, 2000	Cerro Tololo	Deep Ecliptic Survey	AGN	1.1 km	MPC · JPL
421842	2014 QG_{122}	—	October 11, 2007	Catalina	CSS	·	900 m	MPC · JPL
421843	2014 QL_{122}	—	January 18, 2009	Kitt Peak	Spacewatch	·	1.0 km	MPC · JPL
421844	2014 QX_{122}	—	August 11, 1997	Kitt Peak	Spacewatch	THM	2.2 km	MPC · JPL
421845	2014 QX_{128}	—	September 24, 1995	Kitt Peak	Spacewatch	·	1.1 km	MPC · JPL
421846	2014 QN_{129}	—	October 8, 1999	Kitt Peak	Spacewatch	·	1.6 km	MPC · JPL
421847	2014 QY_{129}	—	November 15, 1998	Kitt Peak	Spacewatch	·	540 m	MPC · JPL
421848	2014 QP_{131}	—	March 31, 2008	Kitt Peak	Spacewatch	·	1.7 km	MPC · JPL
421849	2014 QA_{132}	—	April 7, 2006	Kitt Peak	Spacewatch	NYS	950 m	MPC · JPL
421850	2014 QC_{133}	—	September 5, 2000	Kitt Peak	Spacewatch	·	1.9 km	MPC · JPL
421851	2014 QR_{133}	—	December 12, 2006	Kitt Peak	Spacewatch	(11882)	1.3 km	MPC · JPL
421852	2014 QP_{134}	—	March 10, 2007	Kitt Peak	Spacewatch	THM	2.2 km	MPC · JPL
421853	2014 QQ_{135}	—	February 1, 2006	Kitt Peak	Spacewatch	·	2.8 km	MPC · JPL
421854	2014 QR_{135}	—	November 15, 2010	Mount Lemmon	Mount Lemmon Survey	·	1.7 km	MPC · JPL
421855	2014 QK_{136}	—	December 28, 2005	Mount Lemmon	Mount Lemmon Survey	·	590 m	MPC · JPL
421856	2014 QP_{137}	—	April 9, 2006	Kitt Peak	Spacewatch	·	1.1 km	MPC · JPL
421857	2014 QZ_{137}	—	September 3, 1999	Kitt Peak	Spacewatch	·	1.3 km	MPC · JPL
421858	2014 QR_{139}	—	August 1, 1995	Kitt Peak	Spacewatch	MAS	740 m	MPC · JPL
421859	2014 QL_{141}	—	February 14, 2004	Kitt Peak	Spacewatch	·	1.4 km	MPC · JPL
421860	2014 QW_{142}	—	September 25, 2000	Haleakala	NEAT	·	2.5 km	MPC · JPL
421861	2014 QC_{143}	—	October 26, 2009	Mount Lemmon	Mount Lemmon Survey	·	2.4 km	MPC · JPL
421862	2014 QE_{143}	—	May 3, 2009	Kitt Peak	Spacewatch	·	1.5 km	MPC · JPL
421863	2014 QE_{145}	—	December 27, 2006	Mount Lemmon	Mount Lemmon Survey	HOF	2.2 km	MPC · JPL
421864	2014 QV_{146}	—	October 11, 2010	Mount Lemmon	Mount Lemmon Survey	NEM	2.1 km	MPC · JPL
421865	2014 QK_{148}	—	September 29, 2005	Kitt Peak	Spacewatch	·	2.0 km	MPC · JPL
421866	2014 QV_{148}	—	April 25, 2006	Mount Lemmon	Mount Lemmon Survey	·	1.1 km	MPC · JPL
421867	2014 QW_{150}	—	November 30, 2005	Kitt Peak	Spacewatch	·	700 m	MPC · JPL
421868	2014 QA_{151}	—	August 22, 2003	Palomar	NEAT	HYG	3.4 km	MPC · JPL
421869	2014 QG_{151}	—	October 23, 2006	Mount Lemmon	Mount Lemmon Survey	·	1.5 km	MPC · JPL
421870	2014 QL_{151}	—	October 12, 2007	Mount Lemmon	Mount Lemmon Survey	·	1.1 km	MPC · JPL
421871	2014 QA_{152}	—	October 11, 2004	Kitt Peak	Spacewatch	·	2.8 km	MPC · JPL
421872	2014 QD_{152}	—	September 15, 2009	Mount Lemmon	Mount Lemmon Survey	EOS	2.4 km	MPC · JPL
421873	2014 QE_{152}	—	November 2, 2011	Kitt Peak	Spacewatch	·	920 m	MPC · JPL
421874	2014 QE_{167}	—	May 27, 2000	Socorro	LINEAR	EUN	1.9 km	MPC · JPL
421875	2014 QA_{170}	—	June 27, 2005	Mount Lemmon	Mount Lemmon Survey	·	1.6 km	MPC · JPL
421876	2014 QH_{170}	—	November 12, 2005	Kitt Peak	Spacewatch	·	880 m	MPC · JPL
421877	2014 QO_{170}	—	February 2, 2006	Mount Lemmon	Mount Lemmon Survey	·	1.7 km	MPC · JPL
421878	2014 QL_{171}	—	October 26, 2009	Mount Lemmon	Mount Lemmon Survey	·	3.1 km	MPC · JPL
421879	2014 QW_{171}	—	September 4, 2010	Mount Lemmon	Mount Lemmon Survey	BRG	1.3 km	MPC · JPL
421880	2014 QT_{172}	—	December 5, 2005	Kitt Peak	Spacewatch	·	1.9 km	MPC · JPL
421881	2014 QY_{173}	—	August 19, 2006	Kitt Peak	Spacewatch	·	840 m	MPC · JPL
421882	2014 QM_{174}	—	November 5, 2007	Mount Lemmon	Mount Lemmon Survey	·	1.1 km	MPC · JPL
421883	2014 QR_{174}	—	September 18, 2003	Kitt Peak	Spacewatch	·	2.6 km	MPC · JPL
421884	2014 QB_{176}	—	February 20, 2002	Kitt Peak	Spacewatch	·	750 m	MPC · JPL
421885	2014 QR_{176}	—	September 30, 2003	Kitt Peak	Spacewatch	·	2.5 km	MPC · JPL
421886	2014 QM_{177}	—	September 12, 2007	Mount Lemmon	Mount Lemmon Survey	MAS	1.0 km	MPC · JPL
421887	2014 QS_{178}	—	September 16, 2003	Kitt Peak	Spacewatch	·	1.2 km	MPC · JPL
421888	2014 QQ_{180}	—	August 5, 2005	Palomar	NEAT	GEF	850 m	MPC · JPL
421889	2014 QB_{188}	—	July 8, 2003	Palomar	NEAT	·	3.1 km	MPC · JPL
421890	2014 QP_{193}	—	December 5, 2005	Kitt Peak	Spacewatch	·	2.3 km	MPC · JPL
421891	2014 QT_{193}	—	February 9, 2008	Kitt Peak	Spacewatch	·	2.1 km	MPC · JPL
421892	2014 QO_{196}	—	January 23, 2006	Mount Lemmon	Mount Lemmon Survey	EOS	1.7 km	MPC · JPL
421893	2014 QH_{198}	—	September 12, 2004	Kitt Peak	Spacewatch	·	890 m	MPC · JPL
421894	2014 QQ_{198}	—	September 28, 2009	Mount Lemmon	Mount Lemmon Survey	·	3.1 km	MPC · JPL
421895	2014 QG_{199}	—	February 12, 2008	Mount Lemmon	Mount Lemmon Survey	·	1.9 km	MPC · JPL
421896	2014 QU_{202}	—	April 30, 2009	Kitt Peak	Spacewatch	·	1.3 km	MPC · JPL
421897	2014 QA_{203}	—	August 6, 2004	Palomar	NEAT	·	2.0 km	MPC · JPL
421898	2014 QF_{203}	—	November 21, 2005	Kitt Peak	Spacewatch	·	1.8 km	MPC · JPL
421899	2014 QQ_{206}	—	April 11, 2010	Kitt Peak	Spacewatch	·	640 m	MPC · JPL
421900	2014 QT_{209}	—	November 26, 2005	Kitt Peak	Spacewatch	KOR	1.4 km	MPC · JPL

== 421901–422000 ==
back to top

Designation			Discovery			Properties		Ref
Permanent	Provisional	Named after	Date	Site	Discoverer(s)	Category	Diam.	Ref
421901	2014 QJ_{211}	—	December 12, 2006	Mount Lemmon	Mount Lemmon Survey	AST	1.5 km	MPC · JPL
421902	2014 QV_{212}	—	December 14, 2006	Mount Lemmon	Mount Lemmon Survey	·	1.3 km	MPC · JPL
421903	2014 QT_{214}	—	September 21, 2003	Kitt Peak	Spacewatch	VER	2.9 km	MPC · JPL
421904	2014 QN_{215}	—	February 10, 2000	Kitt Peak	Spacewatch	·	3.4 km	MPC · JPL
421905	2014 QX_{215}	—	November 7, 2007	Kitt Peak	Spacewatch	·	1.6 km	MPC · JPL
421906	2014 QA_{217}	—	February 1, 2006	Mount Lemmon	Mount Lemmon Survey	·	690 m	MPC · JPL
421907	2014 QM_{217}	—	October 13, 1999	Apache Point	SDSS	·	2.1 km	MPC · JPL
421908	2014 QY_{221}	—	October 15, 2001	Palomar	NEAT	EUN	1.4 km	MPC · JPL
421909	2014 QJ_{224}	—	September 17, 2009	Kitt Peak	Spacewatch	·	2.4 km	MPC · JPL
421910	2014 QR_{224}	—	February 2, 2008	Kitt Peak	Spacewatch	NEM	2.0 km	MPC · JPL
421911	2014 QS_{225}	—	September 18, 2003	Haleakala	NEAT	H	550 m	MPC · JPL
421912	2014 QP_{226}	—	September 27, 2005	Kitt Peak	Spacewatch	AGN	1.2 km	MPC · JPL
421913	2014 QB_{228}	—	March 25, 2007	Mount Lemmon	Mount Lemmon Survey	KOR	1.3 km	MPC · JPL
421914	2014 QM_{228}	—	October 1, 2006	Kitt Peak	Spacewatch	·	1.2 km	MPC · JPL
421915	2014 QN_{229}	—	March 21, 2001	Kitt Peak	Spacewatch	·	2.8 km	MPC · JPL
421916	2014 QZ_{230}	—	January 27, 2007	Kitt Peak	Spacewatch	AGN	1.3 km	MPC · JPL
421917	2014 QD_{231}	—	January 27, 2007	Mount Lemmon	Mount Lemmon Survey	·	2.1 km	MPC · JPL
421918	2014 QO_{231}	—	October 27, 1998	Kitt Peak	Spacewatch	THM	1.6 km	MPC · JPL
421919	2014 QR_{231}	—	September 30, 2003	Kitt Peak	Spacewatch	·	1.5 km	MPC · JPL
421920	2014 QU_{231}	—	March 5, 2002	Kitt Peak	Spacewatch	KOR	1.2 km	MPC · JPL
421921	2014 QF_{233}	—	September 19, 1998	Kitt Peak	Spacewatch	·	970 m	MPC · JPL
421922	2014 QX_{234}	—	March 23, 2003	Apache Point	SDSS	·	1.5 km	MPC · JPL
421923	2014 QR_{235}	—	July 27, 2009	Catalina	CSS	·	2.2 km	MPC · JPL
421924	2014 QS_{236}	—	September 18, 1995	Kitt Peak	Spacewatch	·	1.0 km	MPC · JPL
421925	2014 QZ_{236}	—	December 14, 2006	Mount Lemmon	Mount Lemmon Survey	·	1.4 km	MPC · JPL
421926	2014 QR_{237}	—	January 5, 2006	Kitt Peak	Spacewatch	HYG	2.7 km	MPC · JPL
421927	2014 QY_{238}	—	May 10, 2005	Kitt Peak	Spacewatch	·	1.2 km	MPC · JPL
421928	2014 QC_{239}	—	January 17, 2004	Kitt Peak	Spacewatch	CYB	3.7 km	MPC · JPL
421929	2014 QL_{239}	—	October 14, 2007	Mount Lemmon	Mount Lemmon Survey	·	1.3 km	MPC · JPL
421930	2014 QD_{240}	—	October 1, 2003	Kitt Peak	Spacewatch	·	2.4 km	MPC · JPL
421931	2014 QG_{240}	—	May 3, 2008	Mount Lemmon	Mount Lemmon Survey	·	1.8 km	MPC · JPL
421932	2014 QK_{240}	—	January 31, 2006	Kitt Peak	Spacewatch	THM	2.5 km	MPC · JPL
421933	2014 QO_{240}	—	August 28, 2005	Kitt Peak	Spacewatch	·	1.9 km	MPC · JPL
421934	2014 QC_{241}	—	August 18, 2009	Kitt Peak	Spacewatch	·	2.1 km	MPC · JPL
421935	2014 QS_{242}	—	September 19, 1998	Apache Point	SDSS	·	1.2 km	MPC · JPL
421936	2014 QW_{242}	—	March 31, 1995	Kitt Peak	Spacewatch	·	4.3 km	MPC · JPL
421937	2014 QO_{243}	—	January 27, 2010	WISE	WISE	·	3.9 km	MPC · JPL
421938	2014 QH_{249}	—	April 18, 2002	Kitt Peak	Spacewatch	·	2.0 km	MPC · JPL
421939	2014 QD_{251}	—	October 5, 2005	Catalina	CSS	·	1.8 km	MPC · JPL
421940	2014 QQ_{251}	—	December 30, 2000	Kitt Peak	Spacewatch	·	2.5 km	MPC · JPL
421941	2014 QH_{252}	—	January 11, 2008	Kitt Peak	Spacewatch	·	1.4 km	MPC · JPL
421942	2014 QJ_{252}	—	October 22, 2003	Apache Point	SDSS	·	2.7 km	MPC · JPL
421943	2014 QC_{253}	—	March 27, 2008	Mount Lemmon	Mount Lemmon Survey	·	2.3 km	MPC · JPL
421944	2014 QE_{253}	—	October 23, 2004	Kitt Peak	Spacewatch	EOS	2.3 km	MPC · JPL
421945	2014 QL_{253}	—	May 1, 2001	Kitt Peak	Spacewatch	·	3.6 km	MPC · JPL
421946	2014 QD_{254}	—	January 17, 2005	Kitt Peak	Spacewatch	VER	2.7 km	MPC · JPL
421947	2014 QF_{255}	—	October 21, 2001	Kitt Peak	Spacewatch	·	2.0 km	MPC · JPL
421948	2014 QH_{256}	—	September 5, 2007	Catalina	CSS	·	1.2 km	MPC · JPL
421949	2014 QC_{257}	—	December 1, 2010	Mount Lemmon	Mount Lemmon Survey	·	1.9 km	MPC · JPL
421950	2014 QY_{261}	—	October 27, 2005	Mount Lemmon	Mount Lemmon Survey	·	2.0 km	MPC · JPL
421951	2014 QW_{262}	—	October 23, 2004	Kitt Peak	Spacewatch	EOS	2.1 km	MPC · JPL
421952	2014 QE_{264}	—	April 19, 2006	Catalina	CSS	·	1.2 km	MPC · JPL
421953	2014 QH_{264}	—	May 9, 2002	Palomar	NEAT	·	1.6 km	MPC · JPL
421954	2014 QC_{267}	—	August 20, 2009	Kitt Peak	Spacewatch	·	2.0 km	MPC · JPL
421955	2014 QF_{267}	—	February 20, 2001	Kitt Peak	Spacewatch	·	3.4 km	MPC · JPL
421956	2014 QE_{268}	—	July 12, 2005	Mount Lemmon	Mount Lemmon Survey	MIS	2.6 km	MPC · JPL
421957	2014 QS_{268}	—	November 11, 2001	Apache Point	SDSS	GEF	1.2 km	MPC · JPL
421958	2014 QV_{269}	—	September 11, 2007	Mount Lemmon	Mount Lemmon Survey	·	670 m	MPC · JPL
421959	2014 QY_{269}	—	April 7, 2003	Kitt Peak	Spacewatch	·	850 m	MPC · JPL
421960	2014 QZ_{269}	—	February 23, 2006	Kitt Peak	Spacewatch	EOS	2.6 km	MPC · JPL
421961	2014 QS_{276}	—	September 22, 2003	Palomar	NEAT	V	910 m	MPC · JPL
421962	2014 QX_{279}	—	January 5, 2006	Kitt Peak	Spacewatch	·	2.5 km	MPC · JPL
421963	2014 QQ_{281}	—	December 21, 2003	Kitt Peak	Spacewatch	·	1.3 km	MPC · JPL
421964	2014 QR_{281}	—	July 28, 2009	Catalina	CSS	·	2.4 km	MPC · JPL
421965	2014 QB_{282}	—	September 28, 2001	Palomar	NEAT	·	700 m	MPC · JPL
421966	2014 QR_{283}	—	April 26, 2007	Mount Lemmon	Mount Lemmon Survey	·	4.0 km	MPC · JPL
421967	2014 QZ_{283}	—	March 28, 2009	Mount Lemmon	Mount Lemmon Survey	·	2.4 km	MPC · JPL
421968	2014 QR_{285}	—	June 13, 2007	Kitt Peak	Spacewatch	·	3.8 km	MPC · JPL
421969	2014 QY_{286}	—	September 28, 2003	Kitt Peak	Spacewatch	PHO	1.7 km	MPC · JPL
421970	2014 QO_{288}	—	April 25, 2007	Mount Lemmon	Mount Lemmon Survey	·	4.6 km	MPC · JPL
421971	2014 QZ_{289}	—	November 18, 2006	Mount Lemmon	Mount Lemmon Survey	·	2.6 km	MPC · JPL
421972	2014 QH_{296}	—	July 21, 2001	Kitt Peak	Spacewatch	·	1.7 km	MPC · JPL
421973	2014 QY_{296}	—	October 19, 2007	Catalina	CSS	·	1.3 km	MPC · JPL
421974	2014 QA_{297}	—	August 21, 2004	Siding Spring	SSS	·	500 m	MPC · JPL
421975	2014 QE_{297}	—	July 29, 2001	Palomar	NEAT	EUN	1.7 km	MPC · JPL
421976	2014 QF_{297}	—	April 1, 2005	Kitt Peak	Spacewatch	·	1.7 km	MPC · JPL
421977	2014 QJ_{297}	—	February 28, 2006	Mount Lemmon	Mount Lemmon Survey	·	1.3 km	MPC · JPL
421978	2014 QK_{297}	—	April 9, 2010	Kitt Peak	Spacewatch	·	910 m	MPC · JPL
421979	2014 QP_{297}	—	September 30, 2006	Catalina	CSS	·	800 m	MPC · JPL
421980	2014 QJ_{298}	—	August 20, 2004	Kitt Peak	Spacewatch	·	2.7 km	MPC · JPL
421981	2014 QZ_{298}	—	March 5, 2008	Mount Lemmon	Mount Lemmon Survey	·	1.7 km	MPC · JPL
421982	2014 QM_{299}	—	September 17, 2006	Kitt Peak	Spacewatch	·	1.2 km	MPC · JPL
421983	2014 QY_{302}	—	April 14, 2008	Mount Lemmon	Mount Lemmon Survey	·	2.2 km	MPC · JPL
421984	2014 QT_{304}	—	September 19, 1998	Apache Point	SDSS	·	2.8 km	MPC · JPL
421985	2014 QC_{305}	—	November 1, 2010	Kitt Peak	Spacewatch	·	1.8 km	MPC · JPL
421986	2014 QP_{305}	—	November 5, 2007	Kitt Peak	Spacewatch	·	1.2 km	MPC · JPL
421987	2014 QQ_{305}	—	August 9, 2007	Kitt Peak	Spacewatch	·	650 m	MPC · JPL
421988	2014 QK_{306}	—	September 18, 2003	Kitt Peak	Spacewatch	·	2.8 km	MPC · JPL
421989	2014 QO_{306}	—	July 31, 2005	Palomar	NEAT	·	1.6 km	MPC · JPL
421990	2014 QH_{307}	—	November 27, 2009	Mount Lemmon	Mount Lemmon Survey	·	4.3 km	MPC · JPL
421991	2014 QY_{307}	—	August 17, 2009	Catalina	CSS	·	3.1 km	MPC · JPL
421992	2014 QA_{308}	—	November 11, 2006	Mount Lemmon	Mount Lemmon Survey	·	1.4 km	MPC · JPL
421993	2014 QN_{308}	—	September 21, 2003	Kitt Peak	Spacewatch	·	3.1 km	MPC · JPL
421994	2014 QW_{308}	—	October 23, 2006	Mount Lemmon	Mount Lemmon Survey	·	1.6 km	MPC · JPL
421995	2014 QC_{309}	—	January 23, 2006	Kitt Peak	Spacewatch	·	5.6 km	MPC · JPL
421996	2014 QR_{309}	—	February 24, 2008	Kitt Peak	Spacewatch	·	1.8 km	MPC · JPL
421997	2014 QP_{310}	—	September 20, 2003	Kitt Peak	Spacewatch	THB	2.7 km	MPC · JPL
421998	2014 QE_{311}	—	September 16, 2010	Catalina	CSS	·	1.5 km	MPC · JPL
421999	2014 QN_{311}	—	March 7, 2008	Mount Lemmon	Mount Lemmon Survey	AGN	1.1 km	MPC · JPL
422000	2014 QY_{311}	—	December 21, 2003	Kitt Peak	Spacewatch	·	3.7 km	MPC · JPL

back to top

== Meaning of names ==
As minor planet discoveries are confirmed, they are given a permanent number by the IAU's Minor Planet Center (MPC), and the discoverers can then submit names for them, following the IAU's naming conventions. The list below concerns those minor planets in the specified number-range that have received names, and explains the meanings of those names.

Official naming citations of newly named small Solar System bodies are approved and published in a bulletin by IAU's Working Group for Small Bodies Nomenclature (WGSBN). Before May 2021, citations were published in MPC's Minor Planet Circulars for many decades. Recent citations can also be found on the JPL Small-Body Database (SBDB). Until his death in 2016, German astronomer Lutz D. Schmadel compiled these citations into the Dictionary of Minor Planet Names (DMP) and regularly updated the collection.

Based on Paul Herget's The Names of the Minor Planets, Schmadel also researched the unclear origin of numerous asteroids, most of which had been named prior to World War II. This article incorporates text from this source, which is in the public domain: SBDB New namings may only be added to this list below after official publication as the preannouncement of names is condemned. The WGSBN publishes a comprehensive guideline for the naming rules of non-cometary small Solar System bodies.

Named minor planet	Provisional	This minor planet was named for...	Ref · Catalog
421774 Jeffreyrose	2014 QM_{13}	Jeffrey Robert Rose (1974–2014) was an artist and musician born and raised near Syracuse, New York.	IAU · 421774
