= 1979 Sakharov =

Stony main-belt asteroid

Discovery
- Discovered by: C. J. van Houten; I. van Houten-G. T. Gehrels
- Discovery site: Palomar Obs.
- Discovery date: 24 September 1960

Designations
- Named after: Andrei Sakharov (Russian physicist)
- Alternative designations: 2006 P-L · 1971 SQ_{3} 1982 SZ_{12}
- Minor planet category: main-belt · Vestian

Orbital characteristics
- Epoch 4 September 2017 (JD 2458000.5)
- Uncertainty parameter 0
- Observation arc: 56.60 yr (20,672 days)
- Aphelion: 2.6125 AU
- Perihelion: 2.1368 AU
- Semi-major axis: 2.3747 AU
- Eccentricity: 0.1002
- Orbital period (sidereal): 3.66 yr (1,337 days)
- Mean anomaly: 157.42°
- Mean motion: 0° 16^{m} 9.48^{s} / day
- Inclination: 6.0480°
- Longitude of ascending node: 202.65°
- Argument of perihelion: 221.15°

Physical characteristics
- Dimensions: 4.51 km (taken); 4.512 km 4.760±0.211 km
- Synodic rotation period: 7.5202±0.0003 h 7.5209±0.0002 h (Note: Pravec (2011) web: rotation period 7.5209±0.0002 hours with a brightness amplitude of 0.13 magnitude and an absolute magnitude of 13.31 (see lightcurve plot). Also, Pravec(2013) web: rotation period 7.521±0.005 hours with a brightness amplitude of 0.21 mag. Summary figures at Collaborative Asteroid Lightcurve Link (CALL) for (1979) Sakharov and Pravec, P.; Wolf, M.; Sarounova, L. (2011) / Pravec, P.; Wolf, M.; Sarounova, L. (2013)); 7.521±0.005 h 7.589±0.001 h
- Geometric albedo: 0.262; 0.3103±0.0450; 0.394±0.040
- Spectral type: Q-V · S
- Absolute magnitude (H): 13.31±0.02 (R) · 13.5 · 13.6 · 13.67±0.28 · 13.8±0.054

1979 Sakharov, provisionally designated 2006 P-L, is a stony Vestian asteroid from the inner regions of the asteroid belt, approximately 4.5 kilometers in diameter. It was discovered during the Palomar–Leiden survey in 1960, and named after Russian physicist Andrei Sakharov.

== Discovery ==
Sakharov was discovered on 24 September 1960, by the Dutch astronomers Ingrid and Cornelis van Houten, on photographic plates taken by Dutch–American astronomer Tom Gehrels at the U.S. Palomar Observatory in California.

=== Survey designation ===
The survey designation "P-L" stands for Palomar–Leiden, named after Palomar Observatory and Leiden Observatory, which collaborated on the fruitful Palomar–Leiden survey in the 1960s. Gehrels used Palomar's Samuel Oschin telescope (also known as the 48-inch Schmidt Telescope), and shipped the photographic plates to Ingrid and Cornelis van Houten at Leiden Observatory where astrometry was carried out. The trio are credited with the discovery of several thousand minor planets.

== Orbit and classification ==
Sakharov is a member of the Vesta family, which is named after the main-belt's second-largest body, 4 Vesta. It orbits the Sun in the inner main-belt at a distance of 2.1–2.6 AU once every 3 years and 8 months (1,337 days). Its orbit has an eccentricity of 0.10 and an inclination of 6° with respect to the ecliptic. The body's observation arc begins with its official discovery observation at Palomar, .

== Physical characteristics ==
The stony S-type asteroid, has been characterized as a Q-V-type by PanSTARRS photometric survey.

=== Rotation period ===
In 2011 and 2013, a total of four well-defined rotational lightcurves were obtained for this asteroid by astronomers Julian Oey at the Australian Kingsgrove and Leura/ Blue Mountains Observatory (E19 and E17/Q68) and by Petr Pravec at the Czech Ondřejov Observatory. The lightcurve gave a rotation period of 7.520 to 7.589 hours with a brightness variation between 0.12 and 0.22 in magnitude (U=3/3-/3-/3).

=== Diameter and albedo ===
According to the original data from the NEOWISE mission of NASA's Wide-field Infrared Survey Explorer, the asteroid measures 4.8 kilometers in diameter and its surface has an albedo of 0.31, while the Collaborative Asteroid Lightcurve Link agrees with the revised NEOWISE data which gave an albedo of 0.26 and a diameter of 4.5 kilometers with an absolute magnitude of 13.8.

== Naming ==
This minor planet was named in honour of renowned Russian mathematician and physicist Andrei Sakharov (1921–1989), who received the Nobel Peace Prize in 1975. The official naming citation was published by the Minor Planet Center on 1 August 1981 (M.P.C. 6207).
