= 1777 Gehrels =

Asteroid

Discovery
- Discovered by: C. J. van Houten; I. van Houten-G. T. Gehrels
- Discovery site: Palomar Obs.
- Discovery date: 24 September 1960

Designations
- Named after: Tom Gehrels (astronomer)
- Alternative designations: 4007 P-L · 1937 GN; 1941 BU · 1951 QB; 1958 DA · A905 UE; A923 AA
- Minor planet category: main-belt · (middle)

Orbital characteristics
- Epoch 4 September 2017 (JD 2458000.5)
- Uncertainty parameter 0
- Observation arc: 111.43 yr (40,699 days)
- Aphelion: 2.6705 AU
- Perihelion: 2.5810 AU
- Semi-major axis: 2.6258 AU
- Eccentricity: 0.0171
- Orbital period (sidereal): 4.25 yr (1,554 days)
- Mean anomaly: 37.596°
- Mean motion: 0° 13^{m} 53.76^{s} / day
- Inclination: 3.1476°
- Longitude of ascending node: 334.69°
- Argument of perihelion: 131.12°

Physical characteristics
- Dimensions: 11.860±0.184; 12.486±0.228 km 12.667 km 12.67 km (taken); 13.14±1.25 km
- Synodic rotation period: 2.83±0.05 h 2.83552±0.00001 h 2.8356±0.0002 h (Note: Pravec (2005) web: rotation period 2.8356±0.0002 hours with a brightness amplitude of 0.23 mag. Pravec (1990) web:rotation period 2.8356±0.0001 hours with a brightness amplitude of 0.21 mag. Summary figures at Collaborative Asteroid Lightcurve Link (CALL) for (1777) Gehrels) (Note: Lightcurve plot A and lightcurve plot B by Petr Pravec (2005) from Ondrejov data obtained by the NEO Photometric Program and collaborating projects); 2.8356±0.0001 h 2.8358±0.0001 h 2.836±0.001 h 2.837±0.002 h 2.840±0.004 h (Note: Lightcurve plot by Petr Pravec from re-analysis of the Wisniewski et al. (1997) data)
- Geometric albedo: 0.2151; 0.2212±0.0170; 0.244±0.013; 0.277±0.274
- Spectral type: SMASS = Sq · S
- Absolute magnitude (H): 11.42 · 11.6 · 11.77±0.03 · 11.773±0.03 · 11.78 · 11.78±0.05

1777 Gehrels, also designated 4007 P-L, is a stony asteroid from the middle region of the asteroid belt, approximately 13 kilometers in diameter. It was discovered during the Palomar–Leiden survey in 1960, and named for astronomer Tom Gehrels, one of the survey's principal investigators and credited discoverer.

== Discovery ==
Gehrels was discovered during the Palomar–Leiden survey by the Dutch astronomer couple Ingrid and Cornelis van Houten, in collaboration with Dutch–American astronomer Tom Gehrels at Palomar Observatory, California, on 24 September 1960.

The survey designation "P-L" stands for Palomar–Leiden, named after Palomar and Leiden Observatory, which collaborated on the fruitful Palomar–Leiden survey in the 1960s. Gehrels used Palomar's Samuel Oschin telescope (also known as the 48-inch Schmidt Telescope), and shipped the photographic plates to Ingrid and Cornelis van Houten at Leiden Observatory, where astrometry was carried out. The trio are credited with the discovery of several thousand minor planets.

== Orbit and classification ==
It orbits the Sun in the central main-belt at a distance of 2.6–2.7 AU once every 4 years and 3 months (1,554 days). Its orbit has an eccentricity of 0.02 and an inclination of 3° with respect to the ecliptic.

First observed as A905 UE at Heidelberg Observatory in 1905, Gehrels' first used observation was made at Goethe Link Observatory in 1958, extending the body's observation arc by 2 years prior to its official discovery at Palomar.

== Physical characteristics ==
This S-type asteroid is characterized as a transitional Sq-type in the SMASS classification.

=== Diameter and albedo ===
According to the survey carried out by NASA's Wide-field Infrared Survey Explorer (WISE) with its subsequent NEOWISE mission, Gehrels measures between 11.860 and 13.14 kilometers in diameter and its surface has an albedo between 0.2212 and 0.277.

The Collaborative Asteroid Lightcurve Link adopts Petr Pravec's revised WISE-data and takes an albedo of 0.2151 with a diameter of 12.67 kilometers based on an absolute magnitude of 11.773.

=== Lightcurves ===
Several rotational lightcurve of Gehrels were obtained from photometric observations by astronomers Wiesław Wiśniewski, Petr Pravec, Pierre Antonini, Raoul Behrend, Donn Starkey, Laurent Bernasconi, Jacques Montier, Serge Heterier, Daniel Klinglesmith and Robert Stephens. Lightcurve analysis gave a rotation period between 2.83 and 2.840 hours with a brightness variation of 0.21 and 0.27 magnitude (U=2/3/3/2+/2/3).

== Naming ==
This minor planet was named in honor of Dutch-born American astronomer Tom Gehrels (1925–2011), professor at the University of Arizona, staff member of the LPL research center at Tucson, a principal investigator in the Pioneer program, receiver of the Masursky Award, initiator of the Spacewatch project, and co-discoverer of thousands of minor planets in the Palomar–Leiden survey (see above). He was a pioneer in the field of photometric and polarimetric observations of Solar System bodies in the 1950s. The official naming citation was published by the Minor Planet Center on 25 September 1971 (M.P.C. 3185).
