= Tom Gehrels =

Dutch–American astronomer

- Gehrels at Spacewatch Telescope 1980's
- Born: February 21, 1925; Haarlemmermeer, North Holland, Netherlands
- Died: July 11, 2011 (aged 86); Tucson, Arizona, United States
- Occupation: Astronomer

Anton Marie Jacob "Tom" Gehrels (February 21, 1925 – July 11, 2011) was a Dutch–American astronomer, Professor of Planetary Sciences, and Astronomer at the University of Arizona, Tucson.

== Biography ==
=== Youth and education ===
Gehrels was born at Haarlemmermeer, the Netherlands on February 21, 1925. He was born in bible-belt Netherlands, and was forced to attend church regularly, an act he despised. When he was older he rejoiced when he found out his childhood church had been destroyed. During World War II he was, as a teenager, active in the Dutch Resistance. After he escaped to England, he was sent back by parachute as an organizer for Special Operations Executive SOE committing sabotage against the German forces.

After the war, he attended the University of Leiden where he graduated with a degree in physics and astronomy in 1951. He continued his education at the University of Chicago where he obtained his doctorate in astronomy and astrophysics in 1956 under Professor Gerard P. Kuiper. In 1960, he moved to the University of Arizona along with Gerard Kuiper where he would remain for the next 50 years.

=== Astronomical work ===
Discovered comets (selection)
C/1972 F1 (Gehrels)	16 March 1972
64P/Swift-Gehrels*	8 February 1973
78P/Gehrels 2	29 September 1973
82P/Gehrels 3	27 October 1975
90P/Gehrels 1	11 October 1972
270P/Gehrels	1 February 1997
* in 1889 by Swift, rediscovered

Minor planets discovered: 4625
1778 Alfvén	26 September 1960
1864 Daedalus	24 March 1971
1873 Agenor	25 March 1971
1979 Sakharov	24 September 1960
2247 Hiroshima	24 September 1960
also see Discoveries by Tom Gehrels

Gehrels pioneered the first photometric system of asteroids in the 1950s, and wavelength dependence of polarization of stars and planets in the 1960s, each resulting in an extended sequence of papers in the Astronomical Journal.

He discovered, jointly with the husband and wife team of Cornelis Johannes van Houten and Ingrid van Houten-Groeneveld, over 4000 asteroids, including Apollo asteroids, Amor asteroids, as well as dozens of Trojan asteroids. That was done in a sky survey using the 48-inch Schmidt telescope at Palomar Observatory and shipping the plates to the two Dutch astronomers at Leiden Observatory, who analyzed them for new asteroids. The trio are jointly credited with several thousand discoveries. Gehrels also discovered a number of comets.

He was Principal Investigator for the Imaging Photopolarimeter experiment on the Pioneer 10 and Pioneer 11 first flybys of Jupiter and Saturn in the 1970s.

Gehrels initiated the Space Science Series of textbooks, was General Editor for the first 30 volumes of the University of Arizona Press, and set the style by participating in the editing of six of them. He also initiated the Spacewatch program in 1980 and was its Principal Investigator (PI) for electronic surveying to obtain statistics of asteroids and comets, including near-Earth asteroids. Bob McMillan was co-investigator and manager, and became the PI in 1997.

Gehrels taught an undergraduate course for non-science majors in Tucson in the Fall, and lectured a brief version of that in the Spring at the Physical Research Laboratory in Ahmedabad, India. His recent research was on cosmology and evolution of the universe, which was woven in as the guiding thread through these courses. He was the named winner of the 2007 Harold Masursky Award for his outstanding service to planetary science.

Gehrels was requested by the Journal Nature to write a review on a book regarding Wernher von Braun, in which he quotes inmates of concentration camp Dora. He has therefore charged that von Braun was there regularly and much in charge, and that von Braun bears greater responsibility and guilt than his official biography would imply. Towards the end of the book review it reads: Von Braun needs no phony defense, for he was a great man in his own scientific specialization... What is needed is a more sophisticated historical perspective....

Tom Gehrels was the husband of Aleida J. Gehrels (née de Stoppelaar) and father of Neil Gehrels, George Gehrels and Jo-Ann Gehrels. He died in Tucson, Arizona. The minor planet 1777 Gehrels was named in his honour. The professional and personal papers of Tom Gehrels are held at the University of Arizona.

== Career ==
- Special airborne services in Europe and Far East, 1944–1948.
- B.Sc. astronomy and physics, Leiden University 1951.
- Ph.D. astronomy and astrophysics, Univ. of Chicago, 1956.
- Professor of Planetary Sciences and Astronomy, Univ. of Arizona, 1961–2011.

== Books ==
- Physical Studies of Minor Planets, edited by Tom Gehrels (1971), NASA SP-267
- Planets Stars and Nebulae Studied With Photopolarimetry, edited by Tom Gehrels (1974) Tucson: University of Arizona Press ISBN 0-8165-0428-8
- Jupiter: Studies of the Interior, Atmosphere, Magnetosphere, and Satellites, edited by Tom Gehrels and Mildred Shapley Matthews (1976) Tucson: University of Arizona Press ISBN 0-8165-0530-6
- Protostars & Planets: Studies of Star Formation and of the Origin of the Solar System, edited by Tom Gehrels and Mildred Shapley Matthews (1978) Tucson: University of Arizona Press ISBN 0-8165-0674-4
- Asteroids, edited by Tom Gehrels and Mildred Shapley Matthews (1979), ISBN 0-8165-0695-7
- Saturn, edited by Tom Gehrels and Mildred Shapley Matthews (1984) Tucson: University of Arizona Press ISBN 0-8165-0829-1
- Asteroids II, edited by Richard P. Binzel, Tom Gehrels, and Mildred Shapely Matthews (1989) Tucson: University of Arizona Press ISBN 0-8165-1123-3
- Hazards Due to Comets and Asteroids, edited by Tom Gehrels, Mildred Shapley Matthews, and A. M. Schumann (1994) Tucson: University of Arizona Press ISBN 0-8165-1505-0
- On the Glassy Sea, in Search of a Worldview, Tom Gehrels (2007, originally published in 1988), ISBN 1-4196-8247-4
- Survival Through Evolution: From Multiverse to Modern Society, Tom Gehrels (2007), ISBN 1-4196-7055-7
- "The Chandra Multiverse", in From Big Bang to Galactic Civilizations: A Big History Anthology, Volume 3, The Ways that Big History Works: Cosmos, Life, Society, and our Future, eds. Barry Rodrigue, Leonid Grinin, Andrey Korotayev, Delhi: Primus Books, 2017, pp. 45-70.

== See also ==
- Ida Barney
- Palomar–Leiden survey
