= 1912 Anubis =

Stony main-belt asteroid

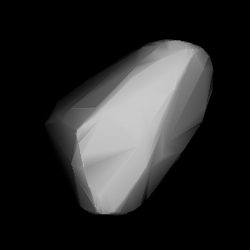
- Modelled shape of Anubis from its lightcurve

Discovery
- Discovered by: C. J. van Houten; I. van Houten-G. Tom Gehrels
- Discovery site: Palomar Obs.
- Discovery date: 24 September 1960

Designations
- Pronunciation: /əˈnjuːbɪs/
- Named after: Anubis (Egyptian deity)
- Alternative designations: 6534 P-L · 1938 DJ_{2} 1943 DD · 1968 HQ
- Minor planet category: main-belt · Koronis

Orbital characteristics
- Epoch 4 September 2017 (JD 2458000.5)
- Uncertainty parameter 0
- Observation arc: 74.27 yr (27,127 days)
- Aphelion: 3.1736 AU
- Perihelion: 2.6387 AU
- Semi-major axis: 2.9061 AU
- Eccentricity: 0.0920
- Orbital period (sidereal): 4.95 yr (1,810 days)
- Mean anomaly: 154.97°
- Mean motion: 0° 11^{m} 56.04^{s} / day
- Inclination: 3.1576°
- Longitude of ascending node: 76.223°
- Time of perihelion: 2025-Jun-23
- Argument of perihelion: 317.02°

Physical characteristics
- Mean diameter: 10.28 km (calculated); 10.407±0.952 km
- Synodic rotation period: 4.626±0.001 h 4.628±0.0012 h
- Geometric albedo: 0.24 (assumed); 0.382±0.250
- Spectral type: S
- Absolute magnitude (H): 11.406±0.001 (R) · 11.57 · 11.8 · 12.11 · 12.20±0.19

1912 Anubis (prov. designation: 6534 P-L) is a stony Koronis asteroid from the outer region of the asteroid belt, approximately 10 kilometers (6.2 miles) in diameter. It was named after the Egyptian deity Anubis.

== Orbit and classification ==
The S-type asteroid is a member of the Koronis family, a group consisting of about 200 known bodies. It orbits the Sun in the outer main-belt at a distance of 2.6–3.2 AU once every 4 years and 11 months (1,810 days). Its orbit has an eccentricity of 0.09 and an inclination of 3° with respect to the ecliptic.

== Discovery ==
Anubis was discovered on 24 September 1960, by the Dutch and Dutch–American astronomers Ingrid and Cornelis van Houten at Leiden, and Tom Gehrels, who took the photographic plates at Palomar Observatory, California. On the same night, the trio of astronomers also discovered 1923 Osiris, 1924 Horus and 5011 Ptah, also named after Ancient Egyptian deities.

The survey designation "P-L" stands for Palomar–Leiden, named after Palomar Observatory and Leiden Observatory, which collaborated on the fruitful Palomar–Leiden survey in the 1960s. Gehrels used Palomar's Samuel Oschin telescope (also known as the 48-inch Schmidt Telescope), and shipped the photographic plates to Ingrid and Cornelis van Houten at Leiden Observatory where astrometry was carried out. The trio are credited with the discovery of several thousand minor planets.

== Physical characteristics ==
According to the survey carried out by NASA's Wide-field Infrared Survey Explorer with its subsequent NEOWISE mission, Anubis measures 10.407 kilometers in diameter and its surface has an albedo of 0.382, while the Collaborative Asteroid Lightcurve Link (CALL) assumes a standard albedo for stony members of the Koronis family of 0.24, and calculates a diameter of 10.28 kilometers with an absolute magnitude of 12.11.

In 2010 and 2012, two rotational lightcurves of Anubis were obtained from photometric observations at the Palomar Transient Factory in California. Lightcurve analysis gave a rotation period of 4.626 and 4.628 hours with a brightness amplitude of 0.47 and 0.18 magnitude, respectively (U=2/2). CALL adopts the shorter period of 4.626 hours.

== Naming ==
This minor planet was named after Anubis, the jackal-headed Egyptian god and protector of the dead. The approved naming citation was published by the Minor Planet Center on 1 November 1979 (M.P.C. 5013).
