= 5011 Ptah =

Near-Earth asteroid

Discovery
- Discovered by: C. van Houten; I. van Houten; T. Gehrels
- Discovery site: Palomar Obs.
- Discovery date: 24 September 1960

Designations
- Pronunciation: /ˈtɑː/
- Named after: Ptah (Egyptian mythology)
- Alternative designations: 6743 P-L · 1983 TF_{2}
- Minor planet category: Apollo · NEO · PHA; Mars-crosser

Orbital characteristics
- Epoch 4 September 2017 (JD 2458000.5)
- Uncertainty parameter 0
- Observation arc: 55.90 yr (20,419 days)
- Aphelion: 2.4533 AU
- Perihelion: 0.8181 AU
- Semi-major axis: 1.6357 AU
- Eccentricity: 0.4998
- Orbital period (sidereal): 2.09 yr (764 days)
- Mean anomaly: 29.031°
- Mean motion: 0° 28^{m} 15.96^{s} / day
- Inclination: 7.4075°
- Longitude of ascending node: 10.780°
- Argument of perihelion: 105.75°
- Earth MOID: 0.0256 AU · 10 LD

Physical characteristics
- Mean diameter: 1.56 km (calculated)
- Geometric albedo: 0.20 (assumed)
- Spectral type: Q
- Absolute magnitude (H): 16.4

5011 Ptah (/ˈtɑː/; prov. designation: 6743 P-L) is a near-Earth object and potentially hazardous asteroid of the Apollo group. It was discovered by astronomers with the Palomar–Leiden survey on 24 September 1960. The rare O-type asteroid on an eccentric orbit measures approximately 1.6 kilometers (1 mile) in diameter. It was named after the Ancient Egyptian deity Ptah.

== Discovery ==
Ptah was discovered on 24 September 1960, by Dutch astronomers Ingrid and Cornelis van Houten at Leiden, on photographic plates taken by Dutch–American astronomer Tom Gehrels at the Palomar Observatory in California. On the same night, the trio of astronomers also discovered the minor planets 1912 Anubis, 1923 Osiris and 1924 Horus, which were also named after Ancient Egyptian deities.

=== Palomar–Leiden survey ===
The survey designation "P-L" stands for Palomar–Leiden, named after Palomar Observatory and Leiden Observatory, which collaborated on the fruitful Palomar–Leiden survey in the 1960s. Gehrels used Palomar's Samuel Oschin telescope (also known as the 48-inch Schmidt Telescope), and shipped the photographic plates to Ingrid and Cornelis van Houten at Leiden Observatory where astrometry was carried out. The trio are credited with the discovery of several thousand minor planets.

== Naming ==
This minor planet was named for the Egyptian creator deity Ptah. In Egyptian mythology, he is the creator of the universe and god of craftsmen and architects. The deity was generally represented in a human form with a sceptre and an ankh. The approved naming citation was published by the Minor Planet Center on 16 May 1992 (M.P.C. 20163).

== Classification and orbit ==
Ptah orbits the Sun at a distance of 0.8–2.5 AU once every 2 years and 1 month (764 days). Its orbit has an eccentricity of 0.50 and an inclination of 7° with respect to the ecliptic. As no precoveries were taken, the asteroid's observation arc begins with its official discovery observation at Palomar.

The potentially hazardous asteroid has a minimum orbit intersection distance with Earth of 0.0256 AU (3,830,000 km) or 10 lunar distances. It passes within that distance of Earth 15 times between 1900 and 2100, most recently on 21 January 2007, at 29.6 million km. The next time will be in 2027 at 28.6 million km. Due to its high eccentricity, Ptah is also a Mars-crosser.

== Physical characteristics ==
According to the "ExploreNEOs" Warm Spitzer program, Ptah is a rare Q-type asteroid, that belongs to the broader S-group of asteroids.

The Collaborative Asteroid Lightcurve Link assumes a standard albedo for stony asteroids of 0.20, and calculates a mean diameter of 1.6 kilometers using an absolute magnitude of 16.4. As of 2017, no rotational lightcurves have been obtained of Ptah, and its rotation period and shape, as well as its spectral type remains unknown.
