= 1924 Horus =

Dark main-belt asteroid

Discovery
- Discovered by: C. J. van Houten; I. van Houten G. T. Gehrels
- Discovery site: Palomar Obs.
- Discovery date: 24 September 1960

Designations
- Pronunciation: /ˈhɔːrəs/
- Named after: Horus (Egyptian mythology)
- Alternative designations: 4023 P-L · 1951 BD; 1969 BA
- Minor planet category: main-belt

Orbital characteristics
- Epoch 4 September 2017 (JD 2458000.5)
- Uncertainty parameter 0
- Observation arc: 56.69 yr (20,707 days)
- Aphelion: 2.6465 AU
- Perihelion: 2.0331 AU
- Semi-major axis: 2.3398 AU
- Eccentricity: 0.1311
- Orbital period (sidereal): 3.58 yr (1,307 days)
- Mean anomaly: 203.62°
- Mean motion: 0° 16^{m} 31.44^{s} / day
- Inclination: 2.7294°
- Longitude of ascending node: 350.27°
- Time of perihelion: 2022-Oct-26
- Argument of perihelion: 152.36°

Physical characteristics
- Dimensions: 12.3 km 12.986±0.135
- Synodic rotation period: 6.183±0.006
- Geometric albedo: 0.070±0.004; 0.0888 ± 0.011
- Absolute magnitude (H): 13.5

1924 Horus, provisional designation 4023 P-L, is a dark asteroid from the inner regions of the asteroid belt, approximately 12 kilometers in diameter. Discovered during the Palomar–Leiden survey in 1960, it was later named after Horus from Egyptian mythology.

== Orbit and classification ==
Horus was discovered on 24 September 1960, by Cornelis Johannes van Houten and Ingrid van Houten-Groeneveld at Leiden, on photographic plates taken by Tom Gehrels at Palomar. On the same date, the trio of astronomers also discovered 1912 Anubis, 1923 Osiris and 5011 Ptah.

The survey designation "P-L" stands for Palomar–Leiden, named after Palomar Observatory and Leiden Observatory, which collaborated on the fruitful Palomar–Leiden survey in the 1960s. Gehrels used Palomar's Samuel Oschin telescope (also known as the 48-inch Schmidt Telescope), and shipped the photographic plates to Ingrid and Cornelis van Houten at Leiden Observatory where astrometry was carried out. The trio are credited with the discovery of several thousand asteroid discoveries.

== Physical characteristics ==
According to the survey carried out by NASA's Wide-field Infrared Survey Explorer with its subsequent NEOWISE mission, Horus measures 12.986 kilometers in diameter and its surface has an albedo of 0.070. The body has a rotation period of 6.183 hours.

== Naming ==
This minor planet was named after Horus, the falcon-headed king of the sky and the stars, and son of the Egyptian god Osiris. The official naming citation was published by the Minor Planet Center on 1 November 1979 (M.P.C. 5013).
