= List of minor planets: 408001–409000 =

The following is a partial list of minor planets, running from minor-planet number 408001 through 409000, inclusive. The primary data for this and other partial lists is based on JPL's "Small-Body Orbital Elements" and data available from the Minor Planet Center. Critical list information is also provided by the MPC, unless otherwise specified from Lowell Observatory. A detailed description of the table's columns and additional sources are given on the main page including a complete list of every page in this series, and a statistical break-up on the dynamical classification of minor planets.

Also see the summary list of all named bodies in numerical and alphabetical order, and the corresponding naming citations for the number range of this particular list. New namings may only be added to this list after official publication, as the preannouncement of names is condemned by the Working Group for Small Bodies Nomenclature of the International Astronomical Union.

Near-Earth obj.	MBA (inner)	MBA (outer)	Centaur
Mars-crosser	MBA (middle)	Jupiter trojan	Trans-Neptunian obj.
Unclassified

== 408001–408100 ==
Designation			Discovery			Properties		Ref
Permanent	Provisional	Named after	Date	Site	Discoverer(s)	Category	Diam.	Ref
408001	2012 DU_{88}	—	March 15, 2007	Mount Lemmon	Mount Lemmon Survey	·	2.7 km	MPC · JPL
408002	2012 DT_{90}	—	August 15, 2009	Kitt Peak	Spacewatch	·	2.9 km	MPC · JPL
408003	2012 DS_{92}	—	January 19, 2012	Mount Lemmon	Mount Lemmon Survey	·	1.8 km	MPC · JPL
408004	2012 DX_{92}	—	February 21, 2007	Kitt Peak	Spacewatch	KOR	1.2 km	MPC · JPL
408005	2012 DR_{93}	—	September 30, 2003	Kitt Peak	Spacewatch	·	3.7 km	MPC · JPL
408006	2012 DG_{94}	—	July 6, 2010	WISE	WISE	·	1.6 km	MPC · JPL
408007	2012 DH_{94}	—	February 7, 2008	Kitt Peak	Spacewatch	·	1.3 km	MPC · JPL
408008	2012 DW_{95}	—	January 28, 2007	Mount Lemmon	Mount Lemmon Survey	·	2.3 km	MPC · JPL
408009	2012 DD_{96}	—	October 7, 2005	Kitt Peak	Spacewatch	·	1.7 km	MPC · JPL
408010	2012 DQ_{97}	—	October 26, 2005	Kitt Peak	Spacewatch	·	2.3 km	MPC · JPL
408011	2012 EK_{2}	—	August 17, 2009	Kitt Peak	Spacewatch	·	3.1 km	MPC · JPL
408012	2012 EA_{3}	—	October 20, 1998	Kitt Peak	Spacewatch	EOS	2.1 km	MPC · JPL
408013	2012 EB_{4}	—	November 23, 2006	Mount Lemmon	Mount Lemmon Survey	·	2.0 km	MPC · JPL
408014	2012 ER_{4}	—	April 24, 2007	Mount Lemmon	Mount Lemmon Survey	·	2.8 km	MPC · JPL
408015	2012 ES_{5}	—	April 11, 2007	Catalina	CSS	·	3.3 km	MPC · JPL
408016	2012 EG_{9}	—	March 31, 2008	Mount Lemmon	Mount Lemmon Survey	·	2.2 km	MPC · JPL
408017	2012 EG_{11}	—	May 3, 2008	Kitt Peak	Spacewatch	·	2.0 km	MPC · JPL
408018	2012 EW_{12}	—	February 4, 2006	Kitt Peak	Spacewatch	·	3.1 km	MPC · JPL
408019	2012 EY_{15}	—	October 10, 2010	Kitt Peak	Spacewatch	EUN	1.4 km	MPC · JPL
408020	2012 FK_{5}	—	November 10, 2005	Mount Lemmon	Mount Lemmon Survey	·	2.3 km	MPC · JPL
408021	2012 FB_{6}	—	September 10, 2010	Kitt Peak	Spacewatch	·	1.3 km	MPC · JPL
408022	2012 FG_{8}	—	September 10, 2004	Kitt Peak	Spacewatch	·	2.0 km	MPC · JPL
408023	2012 FQ_{9}	—	September 15, 2009	Kitt Peak	Spacewatch	·	3.2 km	MPC · JPL
408024	2012 FN_{10}	—	January 31, 2006	Mount Lemmon	Mount Lemmon Survey	·	2.3 km	MPC · JPL
408025	2012 FL_{11}	—	May 13, 2007	Mount Lemmon	Mount Lemmon Survey	LIX	3.4 km	MPC · JPL
408026	2012 FT_{14}	—	January 23, 2006	Kitt Peak	Spacewatch	·	4.0 km	MPC · JPL
408027	2012 FX_{14}	—	March 16, 2007	Kitt Peak	Spacewatch	·	2.6 km	MPC · JPL
408028	2012 FX_{15}	—	February 26, 2007	Mount Lemmon	Mount Lemmon Survey	KOR	1.5 km	MPC · JPL
408029	2012 FY_{32}	—	September 29, 2003	Kitt Peak	Spacewatch	·	4.0 km	MPC · JPL
408030	2012 FE_{37}	—	August 17, 2009	Kitt Peak	Spacewatch	EOS	2.0 km	MPC · JPL
408031	2012 FL_{38}	—	April 6, 2008	Kitt Peak	Spacewatch	·	1.4 km	MPC · JPL
408032	2012 FM_{40}	—	March 13, 2007	Mount Lemmon	Mount Lemmon Survey	·	2.1 km	MPC · JPL
408033	2012 FO_{42}	—	January 7, 2006	Kitt Peak	Spacewatch	·	4.3 km	MPC · JPL
408034	2012 FU_{47}	—	December 19, 2003	Socorro	LINEAR	NYS	1.4 km	MPC · JPL
408035	2012 FC_{48}	—	October 1, 2003	Kitt Peak	Spacewatch	·	2.6 km	MPC · JPL
408036	2012 FE_{49}	—	January 27, 2007	Mount Lemmon	Mount Lemmon Survey	·	2.0 km	MPC · JPL
408037	2012 FF_{49}	—	November 3, 2005	Kitt Peak	Spacewatch	·	1.8 km	MPC · JPL
408038	2012 FP_{49}	—	March 14, 2007	Mount Lemmon	Mount Lemmon Survey	EOS	2.0 km	MPC · JPL
408039	2012 FJ_{51}	—	March 20, 2007	Kitt Peak	Spacewatch	·	2.3 km	MPC · JPL
408040	2012 FX_{53}	—	March 14, 2007	Mount Lemmon	Mount Lemmon Survey	·	2.8 km	MPC · JPL
408041	2012 FD_{55}	—	October 23, 2004	Kitt Peak	Spacewatch	·	2.9 km	MPC · JPL
408042	2012 FQ_{64}	—	October 11, 2004	Kitt Peak	Spacewatch	·	2.3 km	MPC · JPL
408043	2012 FN_{66}	—	April 19, 2007	Mount Lemmon	Mount Lemmon Survey	·	3.3 km	MPC · JPL
408044	2012 FA_{67}	—	August 28, 2009	Kitt Peak	Spacewatch	·	2.5 km	MPC · JPL
408045	2012 FQ_{67}	—	February 27, 2006	Catalina	CSS	·	4.8 km	MPC · JPL
408046	2012 FV_{67}	—	October 24, 2001	Socorro	LINEAR	·	1.7 km	MPC · JPL
408047	2012 FO_{70}	—	November 7, 2010	Catalina	CSS	·	1.7 km	MPC · JPL
408048	2012 FW_{71}	—	January 23, 2006	Kitt Peak	Spacewatch	HYG	3.0 km	MPC · JPL
408049	2012 FO_{72}	—	March 21, 2001	Anderson Mesa	LONEOS	TIR	3.7 km	MPC · JPL
408050	2012 FD_{73}	—	January 9, 2006	Kitt Peak	Spacewatch	·	3.3 km	MPC · JPL
408051	2012 FM_{73}	—	November 13, 2006	Catalina	CSS	·	1.8 km	MPC · JPL
408052	2012 FM_{74}	—	January 4, 2006	Mount Lemmon	Mount Lemmon Survey	URS	4.4 km	MPC · JPL
408053	2012 FP_{75}	—	January 26, 2006	Catalina	CSS	EOS	2.7 km	MPC · JPL
408054	2012 FW_{75}	—	March 15, 2007	Mount Lemmon	Mount Lemmon Survey	·	3.1 km	MPC · JPL
408055	2012 FX_{75}	—	September 22, 2009	Kitt Peak	Spacewatch	·	3.2 km	MPC · JPL
408056	2012 FL_{76}	—	April 23, 2007	Mount Lemmon	Mount Lemmon Survey	EOS	2.4 km	MPC · JPL
408057	2012 FV_{77}	—	November 11, 2004	Kitt Peak	Spacewatch	EOS	2.7 km	MPC · JPL
408058	2012 FN_{81}	—	March 19, 2007	Mount Lemmon	Mount Lemmon Survey	EOS	2.6 km	MPC · JPL
408059	2012 FA_{82}	—	January 5, 2006	Kitt Peak	Spacewatch	EOS	2.6 km	MPC · JPL
408060	2012 FP_{82}	—	April 27, 2008	Mount Lemmon	Mount Lemmon Survey	·	3.0 km	MPC · JPL
408061	2012 FV_{82}	—	February 18, 2008	Mount Lemmon	Mount Lemmon Survey	V	820 m	MPC · JPL
408062	2012 GB_{4}	—	November 13, 2010	Kitt Peak	Spacewatch	·	1.8 km	MPC · JPL
408063	2012 GZ_{7}	—	November 3, 2004	Kitt Peak	Spacewatch	·	2.9 km	MPC · JPL
408064	2012 GZ_{9}	—	September 18, 2003	Kitt Peak	Spacewatch	·	4.2 km	MPC · JPL
408065	2012 GV_{13}	—	February 27, 2006	Mount Lemmon	Mount Lemmon Survey	·	3.3 km	MPC · JPL
408066	2012 GE_{16}	—	October 3, 2003	Kitt Peak	Spacewatch	·	4.6 km	MPC · JPL
408067	2012 GK_{19}	—	November 8, 2009	Mount Lemmon	Mount Lemmon Survey	·	2.7 km	MPC · JPL
408068	2012 GO_{23}	—	October 22, 2005	Kitt Peak	Spacewatch	·	2.3 km	MPC · JPL
408069	2012 GA_{26}	—	March 14, 2007	Mount Lemmon	Mount Lemmon Survey	·	2.8 km	MPC · JPL
408070	2012 GF_{28}	—	January 28, 2011	Mount Lemmon	Mount Lemmon Survey	·	2.9 km	MPC · JPL
408071	2012 GA_{30}	—	April 22, 2007	Mount Lemmon	Mount Lemmon Survey	·	2.0 km	MPC · JPL
408072	2012 GY_{30}	—	September 20, 2003	Campo Imperatore	CINEOS	·	3.8 km	MPC · JPL
408073	2012 GA_{32}	—	February 20, 2006	Mount Lemmon	Mount Lemmon Survey	·	3.1 km	MPC · JPL
408074	2012 GC_{36}	—	March 14, 1999	Kitt Peak	Spacewatch	·	1.6 km	MPC · JPL
408075	2012 HM_{5}	—	March 13, 2002	Kitt Peak	Spacewatch	·	2.5 km	MPC · JPL
408076	2012 HR_{10}	—	March 24, 2006	Kitt Peak	Spacewatch	·	3.2 km	MPC · JPL
408077	2012 HO_{12}	—	March 5, 2006	Kitt Peak	Spacewatch	·	3.0 km	MPC · JPL
408078	2012 HE_{16}	—	May 21, 2006	Catalina	CSS	CYB	4.3 km	MPC · JPL
408079	2012 HY_{31}	—	February 24, 2006	Kitt Peak	Spacewatch	EOS	2.2 km	MPC · JPL
408080	2012 HM_{35}	—	November 17, 1999	Kitt Peak	Spacewatch	·	2.0 km	MPC · JPL
408081	2012 HU_{40}	—	September 9, 2004	Kitt Peak	Spacewatch	EOS	2.0 km	MPC · JPL
408082	2012 HN_{41}	—	March 31, 1995	Kitt Peak	Spacewatch	·	3.4 km	MPC · JPL
408083	2012 HC_{46}	—	January 13, 2011	Kitt Peak	Spacewatch	·	3.4 km	MPC · JPL
408084	2012 HD_{52}	—	March 30, 2001	Kitt Peak	Spacewatch	EOS	2.3 km	MPC · JPL
408085	2012 HO_{53}	—	February 27, 2006	Kitt Peak	Spacewatch	·	2.8 km	MPC · JPL
408086	2012 HO_{56}	—	January 31, 2006	Catalina	CSS	·	3.2 km	MPC · JPL
408087	2012 HY_{56}	—	March 9, 2006	Kitt Peak	Spacewatch	·	3.7 km	MPC · JPL
408088	2012 HP_{57}	—	September 22, 2001	Kitt Peak	Spacewatch	HNS	1.6 km	MPC · JPL
408089	2012 HF_{58}	—	September 20, 2009	Kitt Peak	Spacewatch	EOS	2.4 km	MPC · JPL
408090	2012 HA_{59}	—	April 20, 2007	Kitt Peak	Spacewatch	·	2.4 km	MPC · JPL
408091	2012 HB_{61}	—	October 17, 1998	Kitt Peak	Spacewatch	·	4.4 km	MPC · JPL
408092	2012 HB_{69}	—	March 24, 2006	Kitt Peak	Spacewatch	LUT	6.6 km	MPC · JPL
408093	2012 JQ_{3}	—	September 15, 2009	Kitt Peak	Spacewatch	·	3.2 km	MPC · JPL
408094	2012 JP_{31}	—	November 25, 1998	Kitt Peak	Spacewatch	·	3.0 km	MPC · JPL
408095	2012 JV_{51}	—	October 21, 2008	Mount Lemmon	Mount Lemmon Survey	SYL · CYB	4.2 km	MPC · JPL
408096	2012 KV_{19}	—	September 22, 2003	Kitt Peak	Spacewatch	·	3.1 km	MPC · JPL
408097	2012 TW_{19}	—	October 9, 2007	Catalina	CSS	H	560 m	MPC · JPL
408098	2013 AW	—	May 10, 2005	Mount Lemmon	Mount Lemmon Survey	·	850 m	MPC · JPL
408099	2013 AM_{45}	—	March 17, 2010	Kitt Peak	Spacewatch	·	600 m	MPC · JPL
408100	2013 AX_{50}	—	January 10, 2008	Mount Lemmon	Mount Lemmon Survey	H	530 m	MPC · JPL

== 408101–408200 ==
back to top

Designation			Discovery			Properties		Ref
Permanent	Provisional	Named after	Date	Site	Discoverer(s)	Category	Diam.	Ref
408101	2013 AM_{82}	—	February 17, 2010	Kitt Peak	Spacewatch	·	560 m	MPC · JPL
408102	2013 AN_{89}	—	May 11, 2010	WISE	WISE	·	1.7 km	MPC · JPL
408103	2013 AW_{101}	—	February 7, 2002	Kitt Peak	Spacewatch	H	520 m	MPC · JPL
408104	2013 AV_{123}	—	December 31, 2008	Kitt Peak	Spacewatch	NYS	1.2 km	MPC · JPL
408105	2013 AU_{133}	—	January 19, 2005	Kitt Peak	Spacewatch	·	410 m	MPC · JPL
408106	2013 AC_{150}	—	November 2, 2007	Kitt Peak	Spacewatch	·	2.0 km	MPC · JPL
408107	2013 BA_{13}	—	November 8, 2010	Mount Lemmon	Mount Lemmon Survey	·	2.4 km	MPC · JPL
408108	2013 BH_{26}	—	January 30, 2009	Mount Lemmon	Mount Lemmon Survey	·	980 m	MPC · JPL
408109	2013 BK_{60}	—	January 2, 2009	Kitt Peak	Spacewatch	·	2.1 km	MPC · JPL
408110	2013 BX_{62}	—	May 11, 2007	Mount Lemmon	Mount Lemmon Survey	·	740 m	MPC · JPL
408111	2013 BN_{77}	—	January 23, 2006	Kitt Peak	Spacewatch	·	960 m	MPC · JPL
408112	2013 CL_{5}	—	February 10, 2010	WISE	WISE	·	2.0 km	MPC · JPL
408113	2013 CC_{13}	—	January 31, 2006	Mount Lemmon	Mount Lemmon Survey	MAS	870 m	MPC · JPL
408114	2013 CA_{18}	—	October 18, 2007	Mount Lemmon	Mount Lemmon Survey	·	1.2 km	MPC · JPL
408115	2013 CF_{18}	—	December 7, 2008	Mount Lemmon	Mount Lemmon Survey	·	2.8 km	MPC · JPL
408116	2013 CR_{19}	—	September 19, 2011	Mount Lemmon	Mount Lemmon Survey	·	610 m	MPC · JPL
408117	2013 CH_{22}	—	November 9, 2009	Mount Lemmon	Mount Lemmon Survey	H	600 m	MPC · JPL
408118	2013 CD_{24}	—	April 20, 2006	Kitt Peak	Spacewatch	NYS	1.1 km	MPC · JPL
408119	2013 CO_{24}	—	January 5, 2006	Mount Lemmon	Mount Lemmon Survey	·	910 m	MPC · JPL
408120	2013 CG_{30}	—	March 25, 2006	Kitt Peak	Spacewatch	·	1.2 km	MPC · JPL
408121	2013 CQ_{30}	—	October 16, 2007	Mount Lemmon	Mount Lemmon Survey	·	1.1 km	MPC · JPL
408122	2013 CN_{31}	—	December 4, 2008	Kitt Peak	Spacewatch	·	620 m	MPC · JPL
408123	2013 CS_{32}	—	April 10, 2005	Catalina	CSS	H	960 m	MPC · JPL
408124	2013 CR_{33}	—	January 5, 2006	Catalina	CSS	·	750 m	MPC · JPL
408125	2013 CF_{36}	—	January 25, 2002	Socorro	LINEAR	H	740 m	MPC · JPL
408126	2013 CH_{43}	—	March 17, 2010	Kitt Peak	Spacewatch	·	1.1 km	MPC · JPL
408127	2013 CL_{49}	—	March 29, 2006	Socorro	LINEAR	NYS	1.4 km	MPC · JPL
408128	2013 CW_{54}	—	July 22, 2010	WISE	WISE	·	5.1 km	MPC · JPL
408129	2013 CH_{61}	—	December 8, 2012	Mount Lemmon	Mount Lemmon Survey	V	740 m	MPC · JPL
408130	2013 CY_{61}	—	September 23, 2011	Kitt Peak	Spacewatch	·	710 m	MPC · JPL
408131	2013 CL_{66}	—	February 1, 2006	Kitt Peak	Spacewatch	·	580 m	MPC · JPL
408132	2013 CT_{66}	—	March 2, 2009	Mount Lemmon	Mount Lemmon Survey	·	1.2 km	MPC · JPL
408133	2013 CM_{67}	—	December 6, 2005	Kitt Peak	Spacewatch	·	640 m	MPC · JPL
408134	2013 CQ_{67}	—	February 20, 2006	Kitt Peak	Spacewatch	·	850 m	MPC · JPL
408135	2013 CM_{69}	—	April 4, 2010	Kitt Peak	Spacewatch	·	680 m	MPC · JPL
408136	2013 CU_{70}	—	February 15, 2010	Kitt Peak	Spacewatch	·	590 m	MPC · JPL
408137	2013 CF_{75}	—	December 7, 2008	Mount Lemmon	Mount Lemmon Survey	·	860 m	MPC · JPL
408138	2013 CL_{75}	—	September 10, 2010	Mount Lemmon	Mount Lemmon Survey	·	1.7 km	MPC · JPL
408139	2013 CF_{80}	—	January 23, 2006	Kitt Peak	Spacewatch	·	1.0 km	MPC · JPL
408140	2013 CE_{84}	—	March 18, 2010	Mount Lemmon	Mount Lemmon Survey	·	810 m	MPC · JPL
408141	2013 CX_{86}	—	January 23, 2006	Kitt Peak	Spacewatch	·	930 m	MPC · JPL
408142	2013 CO_{92}	—	October 2, 2006	Mount Lemmon	Mount Lemmon Survey	·	1.5 km	MPC · JPL
408143	2013 CM_{99}	—	April 29, 1997	Kitt Peak	Spacewatch	·	1.1 km	MPC · JPL
408144	2013 CA_{103}	—	December 3, 2008	Mount Lemmon	Mount Lemmon Survey	·	1 km	MPC · JPL
408145	2013 CM_{107}	—	March 30, 2010	WISE	WISE	·	2.1 km	MPC · JPL
408146	2013 CL_{109}	—	April 14, 1997	Kitt Peak	Spacewatch	·	1.0 km	MPC · JPL
408147	2013 CM_{115}	—	January 16, 2013	Mount Lemmon	Mount Lemmon Survey	·	1.4 km	MPC · JPL
408148	2013 CB_{116}	—	March 19, 2010	Mount Lemmon	Mount Lemmon Survey	·	690 m	MPC · JPL
408149	2013 CN_{122}	—	February 1, 2000	Kitt Peak	Spacewatch	HNS	1.3 km	MPC · JPL
408150	2013 CU_{123}	—	February 28, 2009	Kitt Peak	Spacewatch	·	1.2 km	MPC · JPL
408151	2013 CX_{123}	—	January 9, 2013	Mount Lemmon	Mount Lemmon Survey	·	800 m	MPC · JPL
408152	2013 CG_{124}	—	April 10, 2010	Mount Lemmon	Mount Lemmon Survey	·	730 m	MPC · JPL
408153	2013 CQ_{126}	—	October 7, 2005	Mount Lemmon	Mount Lemmon Survey	·	540 m	MPC · JPL
408154	2013 CY_{126}	—	February 17, 2010	Kitt Peak	Spacewatch	·	610 m	MPC · JPL
408155	2013 CD_{127}	—	September 12, 2001	Socorro	LINEAR	·	760 m	MPC · JPL
408156	2013 CP_{137}	—	January 9, 2013	Mount Lemmon	Mount Lemmon Survey	·	1.1 km	MPC · JPL
408157	2013 CW_{137}	—	April 12, 2010	Kitt Peak	Spacewatch	·	600 m	MPC · JPL
408158	2013 CU_{139}	—	January 29, 2009	Mount Lemmon	Mount Lemmon Survey	·	1.1 km	MPC · JPL
408159	2013 CY_{150}	—	December 10, 2005	Kitt Peak	Spacewatch	·	550 m	MPC · JPL
408160	2013 CA_{151}	—	May 29, 2010	WISE	WISE	·	2.2 km	MPC · JPL
408161	2013 CY_{158}	—	April 7, 2006	Kitt Peak	Spacewatch	NYS	810 m	MPC · JPL
408162	2013 CQ_{161}	—	April 11, 2003	Kitt Peak	Spacewatch	·	680 m	MPC · JPL
408163	2013 CJ_{163}	—	September 5, 2007	Catalina	CSS	·	1.2 km	MPC · JPL
408164	2013 CS_{163}	—	May 11, 2010	Mount Lemmon	Mount Lemmon Survey	·	690 m	MPC · JPL
408165	2013 CH_{165}	—	December 29, 2008	Mount Lemmon	Mount Lemmon Survey	·	1.0 km	MPC · JPL
408166	2013 CQ_{168}	—	April 20, 2009	Mount Lemmon	Mount Lemmon Survey	·	1.6 km	MPC · JPL
408167	2013 CT_{169}	—	November 7, 2001	Socorro	LINEAR	PHO	900 m	MPC · JPL
408168	2013 CE_{174}	—	June 8, 2005	Kitt Peak	Spacewatch	·	1.2 km	MPC · JPL
408169	2013 CB_{177}	—	November 18, 2011	Mount Lemmon	Mount Lemmon Survey	·	1.5 km	MPC · JPL
408170	2013 CP_{181}	—	October 18, 2007	Mount Lemmon	Mount Lemmon Survey	NYS	1.3 km	MPC · JPL
408171	2013 CD_{183}	—	May 1, 2009	Mount Lemmon	Mount Lemmon Survey	·	1.7 km	MPC · JPL
408172	2013 CV_{183}	—	April 10, 2002	Socorro	LINEAR	·	1.2 km	MPC · JPL
408173	2013 CT_{191}	—	November 18, 2007	Mount Lemmon	Mount Lemmon Survey	·	2.1 km	MPC · JPL
408174	2013 CC_{198}	—	May 9, 2005	Kitt Peak	Spacewatch	·	2.3 km	MPC · JPL
408175	2013 CA_{199}	—	January 9, 2013	Mount Lemmon	Mount Lemmon Survey	·	1.1 km	MPC · JPL
408176	2013 CM_{218}	—	March 9, 2002	Kitt Peak	Spacewatch	NYS	1.0 km	MPC · JPL
408177	2013 CX_{221}	—	March 16, 2010	Mount Lemmon	Mount Lemmon Survey	·	540 m	MPC · JPL
408178	2013 DW	—	September 25, 2009	Catalina	CSS	H	550 m	MPC · JPL
408179	2013 DH_{4}	—	January 3, 2009	Kitt Peak	Spacewatch	·	960 m	MPC · JPL
408180	2013 DG_{7}	—	July 6, 2010	WISE	WISE	·	2.2 km	MPC · JPL
408181	2013 DR_{11}	—	December 29, 2008	Mount Lemmon	Mount Lemmon Survey	·	1.3 km	MPC · JPL
408182	2013 EY_{2}	—	April 6, 2005	Catalina	CSS	·	1.5 km	MPC · JPL
408183	2013 EK_{4}	—	March 5, 2006	Kitt Peak	Spacewatch	·	990 m	MPC · JPL
408184	2013 EF_{6}	—	September 5, 2010	Mount Lemmon	Mount Lemmon Survey	EUN	1.2 km	MPC · JPL
408185	2013 EF_{10}	—	September 26, 2005	Kitt Peak	Spacewatch	·	2.3 km	MPC · JPL
408186	2013 ED_{11}	—	December 29, 2008	Kitt Peak	Spacewatch	·	860 m	MPC · JPL
408187	2013 EU_{11}	—	March 23, 2006	Kitt Peak	Spacewatch	MAS	700 m	MPC · JPL
408188	2013 EO_{16}	—	December 21, 2008	Mount Lemmon	Mount Lemmon Survey	·	980 m	MPC · JPL
408189	2013 EG_{18}	—	October 5, 2004	Kitt Peak	Spacewatch	·	810 m	MPC · JPL
408190	2013 EG_{19}	—	September 16, 2003	Kitt Peak	Spacewatch	NYS	1.0 km	MPC · JPL
408191	2013 EC_{24}	—	November 15, 2007	Catalina	CSS	·	1.6 km	MPC · JPL
408192	2013 EM_{24}	—	May 26, 2003	Kitt Peak	Spacewatch	·	1.7 km	MPC · JPL
408193	2013 EA_{25}	—	August 27, 2006	Kitt Peak	Spacewatch	·	1.5 km	MPC · JPL
408194	2013 EM_{26}	—	May 4, 2005	Kitt Peak	Spacewatch	·	1.1 km	MPC · JPL
408195	2013 EM_{27}	—	December 29, 2008	Mount Lemmon	Mount Lemmon Survey	·	1.1 km	MPC · JPL
408196	2013 ER_{29}	—	May 28, 2008	Kitt Peak	Spacewatch	·	3.2 km	MPC · JPL
408197	2013 EC_{31}	—	September 29, 2011	Kitt Peak	Spacewatch	·	1.7 km	MPC · JPL
408198	2013 EC_{32}	—	September 29, 2011	Mount Lemmon	Mount Lemmon Survey	·	790 m	MPC · JPL
408199	2013 ES_{32}	—	November 14, 2007	Mount Lemmon	Mount Lemmon Survey	·	1.6 km	MPC · JPL
408200	2013 EJ_{33}	—	November 7, 2008	Mount Lemmon	Mount Lemmon Survey	·	1.1 km	MPC · JPL

== 408201–408300 ==
back to top

Designation			Discovery			Properties		Ref
Permanent	Provisional	Named after	Date	Site	Discoverer(s)	Category	Diam.	Ref
408201	2013 EZ_{33}	—	September 23, 2011	Kitt Peak	Spacewatch	·	850 m	MPC · JPL
408202	2013 EM_{34}	—	August 21, 2004	Catalina	CSS	·	910 m	MPC · JPL
408203	2013 EQ_{39}	—	April 7, 2005	Mount Lemmon	Mount Lemmon Survey	·	1.2 km	MPC · JPL
408204	2013 EZ_{39}	—	April 14, 2008	Mount Lemmon	Mount Lemmon Survey	·	1.6 km	MPC · JPL
408205	2013 EM_{43}	—	February 14, 2002	Kitt Peak	Spacewatch	·	1.1 km	MPC · JPL
408206	2013 EJ_{45}	—	September 30, 2005	Mount Lemmon	Mount Lemmon Survey	·	790 m	MPC · JPL
408207	2013 EH_{49}	—	January 14, 2002	Kitt Peak	Spacewatch	·	2.3 km	MPC · JPL
408208	2013 EM_{49}	—	April 8, 2010	Mount Lemmon	Mount Lemmon Survey	·	590 m	MPC · JPL
408209	2013 ED_{54}	—	October 8, 2007	Kitt Peak	Spacewatch	·	910 m	MPC · JPL
408210	2013 EW_{59}	—	September 23, 2008	Kitt Peak	Spacewatch	·	540 m	MPC · JPL
408211	2013 EO_{62}	—	March 24, 2006	Mount Lemmon	Mount Lemmon Survey	·	820 m	MPC · JPL
408212	2013 EJ_{64}	—	October 9, 2004	Kitt Peak	Spacewatch	·	750 m	MPC · JPL
408213	2013 EN_{66}	—	April 2, 2006	Mount Lemmon	Mount Lemmon Survey	·	1.2 km	MPC · JPL
408214	2013 ES_{66}	—	May 3, 2005	Kitt Peak	Spacewatch	EUN	1.0 km	MPC · JPL
408215	2013 EP_{68}	—	April 2, 2006	Kitt Peak	Spacewatch	·	940 m	MPC · JPL
408216	2013 EC_{71}	—	September 7, 2004	Kitt Peak	Spacewatch	·	680 m	MPC · JPL
408217	2013 EF_{73}	—	April 2, 2006	Kitt Peak	Spacewatch	·	1.1 km	MPC · JPL
408218	2013 EE_{79}	—	August 29, 2006	Kitt Peak	Spacewatch	H	370 m	MPC · JPL
408219	2013 EP_{81}	—	September 25, 2006	Mount Lemmon	Mount Lemmon Survey	·	1.8 km	MPC · JPL
408220	2013 EJ_{85}	—	April 9, 2010	Kitt Peak	Spacewatch	·	780 m	MPC · JPL
408221	2013 EW_{86}	—	April 20, 2009	Kitt Peak	Spacewatch	ADE	1.5 km	MPC · JPL
408222	2013 EM_{87}	—	March 26, 2009	Mount Lemmon	Mount Lemmon Survey	ADE	1.8 km	MPC · JPL
408223	2013 EL_{90}	—	March 3, 2005	Kitt Peak	Spacewatch	·	950 m	MPC · JPL
408224	2013 EO_{90}	—	October 18, 2007	Mount Lemmon	Mount Lemmon Survey	MAS	950 m	MPC · JPL
408225	2013 EK_{91}	—	November 1, 2011	Catalina	CSS	·	1.6 km	MPC · JPL
408226	2013 EW_{91}	—	September 5, 2010	Mount Lemmon	Mount Lemmon Survey	·	1.5 km	MPC · JPL
408227	2013 EP_{94}	—	May 3, 2006	Mount Lemmon	Mount Lemmon Survey	MAS	690 m	MPC · JPL
408228	2013 ED_{95}	—	September 21, 2001	Kitt Peak	Spacewatch	·	530 m	MPC · JPL
408229	2013 EM_{96}	—	April 25, 2008	Kitt Peak	Spacewatch	·	2.6 km	MPC · JPL
408230	2013 EA_{97}	—	February 20, 2006	Kitt Peak	Spacewatch	·	650 m	MPC · JPL
408231	2013 ES_{97}	—	March 2, 2006	Kitt Peak	Spacewatch	·	820 m	MPC · JPL
408232	2013 EN_{98}	—	November 5, 2007	Mount Lemmon	Mount Lemmon Survey	MAS	750 m	MPC · JPL
408233	2013 EK_{99}	—	November 19, 2006	Kitt Peak	Spacewatch	·	1.6 km	MPC · JPL
408234	2013 EY_{100}	—	February 3, 2009	Kitt Peak	Spacewatch	·	1.2 km	MPC · JPL
408235	2013 EW_{101}	—	November 3, 1991	Kitt Peak	Spacewatch	·	1.8 km	MPC · JPL
408236	2013 EU_{102}	—	January 1, 2009	Kitt Peak	Spacewatch	·	980 m	MPC · JPL
408237	2013 EJ_{103}	—	April 30, 2006	Kitt Peak	Spacewatch	NYS	890 m	MPC · JPL
408238	2013 EF_{104}	—	October 4, 1999	Kitt Peak	Spacewatch	·	2.8 km	MPC · JPL
408239	2013 EH_{105}	—	February 20, 2006	Kitt Peak	Spacewatch	·	850 m	MPC · JPL
408240	2013 ES_{109}	—	November 19, 2008	Kitt Peak	Spacewatch	V	610 m	MPC · JPL
408241	2013 EE_{111}	—	April 16, 2004	Kitt Peak	Spacewatch	·	2.5 km	MPC · JPL
408242	2013 EF_{113}	—	April 7, 2005	Kitt Peak	Spacewatch	·	880 m	MPC · JPL
408243	2013 EA_{116}	—	March 25, 2006	Kitt Peak	Spacewatch	V	720 m	MPC · JPL
408244	2013 EH_{117}	—	March 23, 2009	XuYi	PMO NEO Survey Program	·	1.5 km	MPC · JPL
408245	2013 EA_{120}	—	January 20, 2009	Mount Lemmon	Mount Lemmon Survey	MAR	970 m	MPC · JPL
408246	2013 EL_{121}	—	April 14, 2008	Mount Lemmon	Mount Lemmon Survey	·	1.4 km	MPC · JPL
408247	2013 EL_{123}	—	May 10, 2005	Mount Lemmon	Mount Lemmon Survey	·	1.3 km	MPC · JPL
408248	2013 EC_{125}	—	September 15, 2007	Kitt Peak	Spacewatch	·	1 km	MPC · JPL
408249	2013 EC_{127}	—	April 25, 2006	Mount Lemmon	Mount Lemmon Survey	·	1.3 km	MPC · JPL
408250	2013 EY_{127}	—	September 17, 2006	Catalina	CSS	EUN	1.7 km	MPC · JPL
408251	2013 EB_{128}	—	September 25, 2006	Mount Lemmon	Mount Lemmon Survey	RAF	1.0 km	MPC · JPL
408252	2013 EU_{128}	—	April 9, 2010	Kitt Peak	Spacewatch	·	560 m	MPC · JPL
408253	2013 EV_{128}	—	March 4, 2006	Mount Lemmon	Mount Lemmon Survey	·	700 m	MPC · JPL
408254	2013 FA	—	November 10, 2001	Socorro	LINEAR	H	680 m	MPC · JPL
408255	2013 FT_{2}	—	April 22, 2009	Mount Lemmon	Mount Lemmon Survey	EUN	1.3 km	MPC · JPL
408256	2013 FY_{2}	—	April 30, 2005	Kitt Peak	Spacewatch	(5)	1.4 km	MPC · JPL
408257	2013 FT_{6}	—	December 21, 2003	Socorro	LINEAR	EUN	1.4 km	MPC · JPL
408258	2013 FN_{8}	—	May 15, 2009	Kitt Peak	Spacewatch	·	1.9 km	MPC · JPL
408259	2013 FZ_{8}	—	October 20, 2007	Mount Lemmon	Mount Lemmon Survey	V	780 m	MPC · JPL
408260	2013 FN_{9}	—	March 26, 2006	Kitt Peak	Spacewatch	NYS	1.0 km	MPC · JPL
408261	2013 FD_{10}	—	April 9, 2006	Kitt Peak	Spacewatch	·	860 m	MPC · JPL
408262	2013 FL_{11}	—	March 28, 2004	Kitt Peak	Spacewatch	MRX	850 m	MPC · JPL
408263	2013 FL_{12}	—	January 13, 1996	Kitt Peak	Spacewatch	·	830 m	MPC · JPL
408264	2013 FX_{15}	—	April 17, 1996	Kitt Peak	Spacewatch	MIS	2.3 km	MPC · JPL
408265	2013 FA_{16}	—	August 8, 2010	Siding Spring	SSS	·	2.0 km	MPC · JPL
408266	2013 FL_{16}	—	April 17, 2004	Socorro	LINEAR	·	1.6 km	MPC · JPL
408267	2013 FA_{17}	—	April 24, 2004	Kitt Peak	Spacewatch	·	2.1 km	MPC · JPL
408268	2013 FC_{17}	—	March 21, 2009	Kitt Peak	Spacewatch	·	1.1 km	MPC · JPL
408269	2013 FG_{18}	—	April 9, 2005	Mount Lemmon	Mount Lemmon Survey	·	1.8 km	MPC · JPL
408270	2013 FL_{18}	—	September 15, 2007	Kitt Peak	Spacewatch	·	720 m	MPC · JPL
408271	2013 FN_{18}	—	May 17, 2009	Mount Lemmon	Mount Lemmon Survey	EUN	990 m	MPC · JPL
408272	2013 FO_{19}	—	April 9, 2006	Kitt Peak	Spacewatch	·	1.1 km	MPC · JPL
408273	2013 FR_{19}	—	September 10, 2007	Mount Lemmon	Mount Lemmon Survey	·	1.2 km	MPC · JPL
408274	2013 FJ_{21}	—	May 6, 2006	Mount Lemmon	Mount Lemmon Survey	PHO	1.3 km	MPC · JPL
408275	2013 FK_{21}	—	August 26, 2009	Catalina	CSS	·	2.8 km	MPC · JPL
408276	2013 FV_{21}	—	May 6, 2006	Mount Lemmon	Mount Lemmon Survey	·	1.6 km	MPC · JPL
408277	2013 FE_{23}	—	April 25, 2003	Kitt Peak	Spacewatch	·	850 m	MPC · JPL
408278	2013 FB_{27}	—	January 23, 2006	Kitt Peak	Spacewatch	·	690 m	MPC · JPL
408279	2013 GM	—	January 18, 2004	Catalina	CSS	·	2.1 km	MPC · JPL
408280	2013 GP	—	April 4, 2005	Catalina	CSS	·	1.4 km	MPC · JPL
408281	2013 GJ_{1}	—	April 7, 2008	Kitt Peak	Spacewatch	·	2.1 km	MPC · JPL
408282	2013 GY_{3}	—	September 24, 2011	Kitt Peak	Spacewatch	V	530 m	MPC · JPL
408283	2013 GE_{4}	—	February 1, 2009	Kitt Peak	Spacewatch	MAS	860 m	MPC · JPL
408284	2013 GG_{9}	—	March 3, 2008	Mount Lemmon	Mount Lemmon Survey	·	1.9 km	MPC · JPL
408285	2013 GK_{9}	—	March 17, 2004	Kitt Peak	Spacewatch	·	1.7 km	MPC · JPL
408286	2013 GK_{11}	—	April 12, 2005	Kitt Peak	Spacewatch	·	1 km	MPC · JPL
408287	2013 GR_{11}	—	January 23, 2006	Mount Lemmon	Mount Lemmon Survey	·	850 m	MPC · JPL
408288	2013 GT_{11}	—	May 6, 2006	Mount Lemmon	Mount Lemmon Survey	NYS	1.9 km	MPC · JPL
408289	2013 GN_{12}	—	October 2, 2010	Kitt Peak	Spacewatch	·	1.8 km	MPC · JPL
408290	2013 GX_{12}	—	December 27, 2006	Kitt Peak	Spacewatch	·	1.8 km	MPC · JPL
408291	2013 GF_{13}	—	October 10, 2007	Mount Lemmon	Mount Lemmon Survey	PHO	1.9 km	MPC · JPL
408292	2013 GT_{14}	—	December 25, 2005	Kitt Peak	Spacewatch	·	600 m	MPC · JPL
408293	2013 GV_{14}	—	February 28, 2008	Mount Lemmon	Mount Lemmon Survey	·	1.6 km	MPC · JPL
408294	2013 GD_{15}	—	December 31, 2008	Kitt Peak	Spacewatch	·	1.0 km	MPC · JPL
408295	2013 GP_{15}	—	March 2, 2009	Mount Lemmon	Mount Lemmon Survey	·	2.0 km	MPC · JPL
408296	2013 GY_{16}	—	January 19, 2005	Kitt Peak	Spacewatch	MAS	810 m	MPC · JPL
408297	2013 GE_{20}	—	February 17, 2007	Mount Lemmon	Mount Lemmon Survey	·	2.7 km	MPC · JPL
408298	2013 GH_{20}	—	January 28, 2007	Mount Lemmon	Mount Lemmon Survey	THM	2.7 km	MPC · JPL
408299	2013 GP_{23}	—	October 30, 2007	Mount Lemmon	Mount Lemmon Survey	·	1.1 km	MPC · JPL
408300	2013 GH_{24}	—	November 18, 2007	Kitt Peak	Spacewatch	·	1.2 km	MPC · JPL

== 408301–408400 ==
back to top

Designation			Discovery			Properties		Ref
Permanent	Provisional	Named after	Date	Site	Discoverer(s)	Category	Diam.	Ref
408301	2013 GK_{24}	—	October 20, 2011	Kitt Peak	Spacewatch	·	1.3 km	MPC · JPL
408302	2013 GA_{27}	—	October 12, 2005	Kitt Peak	Spacewatch	·	2.5 km	MPC · JPL
408303	2013 GO_{27}	—	February 25, 2006	Mount Lemmon	Mount Lemmon Survey	·	820 m	MPC · JPL
408304	2013 GP_{28}	—	March 5, 2006	Kitt Peak	Spacewatch	·	790 m	MPC · JPL
408305	2013 GP_{29}	—	January 19, 2008	Mount Lemmon	Mount Lemmon Survey	EUN	1.3 km	MPC · JPL
408306	2013 GB_{30}	—	October 22, 2003	Kitt Peak	Spacewatch	·	1.6 km	MPC · JPL
408307	2013 GG_{31}	—	March 13, 2005	Kitt Peak	Spacewatch	·	870 m	MPC · JPL
408308	2013 GF_{33}	—	February 18, 2013	Mount Lemmon	Mount Lemmon Survey	·	1.8 km	MPC · JPL
408309	2013 GG_{33}	—	June 14, 2005	Kitt Peak	Spacewatch	·	1.3 km	MPC · JPL
408310	2013 GY_{36}	—	May 4, 2009	Mount Lemmon	Mount Lemmon Survey	·	1.5 km	MPC · JPL
408311	2013 GN_{37}	—	December 30, 2008	Kitt Peak	Spacewatch	(2076)	850 m	MPC · JPL
408312	2013 GL_{38}	—	October 24, 2011	Kitt Peak	Spacewatch	EUN	1.1 km	MPC · JPL
408313	2013 GU_{40}	—	December 1, 2008	Mount Lemmon	Mount Lemmon Survey	·	1.1 km	MPC · JPL
408314	2013 GV_{40}	—	March 9, 2005	Mount Lemmon	Mount Lemmon Survey	·	1.1 km	MPC · JPL
408315	2013 GL_{42}	—	October 19, 2011	Kitt Peak	Spacewatch	·	960 m	MPC · JPL
408316	2013 GQ_{43}	—	January 15, 2004	Kitt Peak	Spacewatch	·	1.6 km	MPC · JPL
408317	2013 GU_{43}	—	January 18, 2012	Mount Lemmon	Mount Lemmon Survey	THM	2.0 km	MPC · JPL
408318	2013 GG_{47}	—	April 5, 2003	Kitt Peak	Spacewatch	·	680 m	MPC · JPL
408319	2013 GC_{49}	—	February 10, 2002	Socorro	LINEAR	·	820 m	MPC · JPL
408320	2013 GE_{50}	—	November 19, 2006	Kitt Peak	Spacewatch	EUN	1.3 km	MPC · JPL
408321	2013 GF_{50}	—	September 25, 1995	Kitt Peak	Spacewatch	·	2.0 km	MPC · JPL
408322	2013 GR_{52}	—	February 9, 2007	Kitt Peak	Spacewatch	·	3.1 km	MPC · JPL
408323	2013 GZ_{52}	—	April 20, 1998	Kitt Peak	Spacewatch	·	1.2 km	MPC · JPL
408324	2013 GA_{53}	—	January 13, 2008	Kitt Peak	Spacewatch	·	1.2 km	MPC · JPL
408325	2013 GF_{53}	—	October 23, 2001	Socorro	LINEAR	·	2.3 km	MPC · JPL
408326	2013 GU_{53}	—	October 2, 2006	Mount Lemmon	Mount Lemmon Survey	·	1.7 km	MPC · JPL
408327	2013 GM_{55}	—	March 4, 2005	Mount Lemmon	Mount Lemmon Survey	NYS	1.1 km	MPC · JPL
408328	2013 GY_{63}	—	November 19, 2008	Kitt Peak	Spacewatch	·	650 m	MPC · JPL
408329	2013 GA_{67}	—	April 30, 2006	Kitt Peak	Spacewatch	·	790 m	MPC · JPL
408330	2013 GE_{68}	—	March 23, 2004	Socorro	LINEAR	·	1.7 km	MPC · JPL
408331	2013 GW_{71}	—	December 28, 2003	Kitt Peak	Spacewatch	ADE	2.5 km	MPC · JPL
408332	2013 GO_{73}	—	April 17, 2009	Kitt Peak	Spacewatch	·	3.1 km	MPC · JPL
408333	2013 GT_{73}	—	December 14, 2010	Mount Lemmon	Mount Lemmon Survey	·	3.0 km	MPC · JPL
408334	2013 GN_{74}	—	February 6, 2008	Catalina	CSS	GEF	1.1 km	MPC · JPL
408335	2013 GZ_{74}	—	December 12, 2006	Kitt Peak	Spacewatch	·	2.6 km	MPC · JPL
408336	2013 GK_{75}	—	February 26, 2009	Catalina	CSS	·	990 m	MPC · JPL
408337	2013 GZ_{75}	—	April 16, 1999	Kitt Peak	Spacewatch	·	800 m	MPC · JPL
408338	2013 GM_{77}	—	December 30, 2007	Kitt Peak	Spacewatch	·	1.4 km	MPC · JPL
408339	2013 GH_{78}	—	May 10, 1996	Kitt Peak	Spacewatch	THB	3.6 km	MPC · JPL
408340	2013 GO_{79}	—	April 13, 2002	Kitt Peak	Spacewatch	V	740 m	MPC · JPL
408341	2013 GR_{79}	—	April 12, 2008	Kitt Peak	Spacewatch	·	2.0 km	MPC · JPL
408342	2013 GB_{81}	—	March 20, 1998	Kitt Peak	Spacewatch	MAS	660 m	MPC · JPL
408343	2013 GM_{81}	—	September 20, 2011	Mount Lemmon	Mount Lemmon Survey	·	830 m	MPC · JPL
408344	2013 GN_{81}	—	September 15, 2006	Kitt Peak	Spacewatch	HNS	1.4 km	MPC · JPL
408345	2013 GJ_{82}	—	October 1, 2010	Mount Lemmon	Mount Lemmon Survey	·	1.8 km	MPC · JPL
408346	2013 GC_{83}	—	October 30, 2011	Kitt Peak	Spacewatch	·	1.2 km	MPC · JPL
408347	2013 GK_{83}	—	October 14, 2010	Mount Lemmon	Mount Lemmon Survey	EOS	2.3 km	MPC · JPL
408348	2013 GL_{83}	—	January 30, 2008	Kitt Peak	Spacewatch	·	1.5 km	MPC · JPL
408349	2013 GS_{83}	—	March 3, 2005	Catalina	CSS	·	1.4 km	MPC · JPL
408350	2013 GS_{84}	—	April 25, 2003	Kitt Peak	Spacewatch	·	970 m	MPC · JPL
408351	2013 GU_{84}	—	March 31, 2013	Mount Lemmon	Mount Lemmon Survey	·	2.2 km	MPC · JPL
408352	2013 GD_{85}	—	July 2, 2003	Socorro	LINEAR	·	3.4 km	MPC · JPL
408353	2013 GM_{86}	—	March 14, 2004	Kitt Peak	Spacewatch	·	1.5 km	MPC · JPL
408354	2013 GC_{87}	—	March 31, 2008	Catalina	CSS	BRA	1.9 km	MPC · JPL
408355	2013 GX_{88}	—	April 3, 2003	Anderson Mesa	LONEOS	·	900 m	MPC · JPL
408356	2013 GE_{89}	—	October 10, 2007	Kitt Peak	Spacewatch	·	1.4 km	MPC · JPL
408357	2013 GS_{89}	—	December 26, 2005	Kitt Peak	Spacewatch	·	1.4 km	MPC · JPL
408358	2013 GU_{89}	—	June 26, 2006	Siding Spring	SSS	·	1.9 km	MPC · JPL
408359	2013 GO_{90}	—	January 20, 2008	Mount Lemmon	Mount Lemmon Survey	·	2.6 km	MPC · JPL
408360	2013 GT_{90}	—	October 1, 2009	Mount Lemmon	Mount Lemmon Survey	·	3.0 km	MPC · JPL
408361	2013 GF_{91}	—	October 15, 2009	Mount Lemmon	Mount Lemmon Survey	·	2.7 km	MPC · JPL
408362	2013 GG_{91}	—	January 11, 2008	Kitt Peak	Spacewatch	·	1.8 km	MPC · JPL
408363	2013 GS_{91}	—	September 4, 2010	Mount Lemmon	Mount Lemmon Survey	·	1.6 km	MPC · JPL
408364	2013 GW_{91}	—	September 18, 2010	Mount Lemmon	Mount Lemmon Survey	·	1.8 km	MPC · JPL
408365	2013 GX_{91}	—	January 15, 1999	Kitt Peak	Spacewatch	·	1.8 km	MPC · JPL
408366	2013 GZ_{91}	—	September 10, 2010	Kitt Peak	Spacewatch	·	1.3 km	MPC · JPL
408367	2013 GM_{93}	—	January 9, 2006	Kitt Peak	Spacewatch	·	670 m	MPC · JPL
408368	2013 GN_{94}	—	September 19, 2010	Kitt Peak	Spacewatch	·	2.0 km	MPC · JPL
408369	2013 GP_{94}	—	February 20, 2009	Kitt Peak	Spacewatch	NYS	1.3 km	MPC · JPL
408370	2013 GS_{94}	—	January 1, 2009	Kitt Peak	Spacewatch	·	1.0 km	MPC · JPL
408371	2013 GF_{95}	—	April 13, 1996	Kitt Peak	Spacewatch	·	1.6 km	MPC · JPL
408372	2013 GH_{95}	—	October 17, 2010	Mount Lemmon	Mount Lemmon Survey	·	2.7 km	MPC · JPL
408373	2013 GQ_{95}	—	September 17, 2009	Mount Lemmon	Mount Lemmon Survey	·	2.8 km	MPC · JPL
408374	2013 GW_{95}	—	April 18, 2009	Kitt Peak	Spacewatch	·	1.5 km	MPC · JPL
408375	2013 GZ_{95}	—	May 11, 2004	Anderson Mesa	LONEOS	·	2.3 km	MPC · JPL
408376	2013 GG_{96}	—	September 24, 2007	Kitt Peak	Spacewatch	V	650 m	MPC · JPL
408377	2013 GU_{96}	—	May 31, 2000	Kitt Peak	Spacewatch	·	2.1 km	MPC · JPL
408378	2013 GB_{98}	—	April 14, 2004	Kitt Peak	Spacewatch	·	2.2 km	MPC · JPL
408379	2013 GC_{98}	—	October 17, 2006	Catalina	CSS	HNS	1.7 km	MPC · JPL
408380	2013 GP_{98}	—	April 18, 1996	Kitt Peak	Spacewatch	·	1.5 km	MPC · JPL
408381	2013 GP_{99}	—	January 26, 2012	Mount Lemmon	Mount Lemmon Survey	LIX	4.1 km	MPC · JPL
408382	2013 GU_{99}	—	April 10, 2005	Mount Lemmon	Mount Lemmon Survey	·	1.0 km	MPC · JPL
408383	2013 GG_{100}	—	September 23, 2009	Mount Lemmon	Mount Lemmon Survey	·	3.2 km	MPC · JPL
408384	2013 GH_{101}	—	October 11, 1994	Kitt Peak	Spacewatch	·	800 m	MPC · JPL
408385	2013 GJ_{101}	—	March 22, 2001	Kitt Peak	Spacewatch	·	1.3 km	MPC · JPL
408386	2013 GQ_{102}	—	February 7, 2008	Mount Lemmon	Mount Lemmon Survey	MRX	960 m	MPC · JPL
408387	2013 GF_{103}	—	February 6, 2006	Mount Lemmon	Mount Lemmon Survey	·	810 m	MPC · JPL
408388	2013 GC_{104}	—	March 23, 2006	Kitt Peak	Spacewatch	·	1.1 km	MPC · JPL
408389	2013 GK_{105}	—	December 22, 2003	Kitt Peak	Spacewatch	·	1.8 km	MPC · JPL
408390	2013 GX_{105}	—	September 10, 2007	Kitt Peak	Spacewatch	·	970 m	MPC · JPL
408391	2013 GM_{106}	—	October 26, 2008	Kitt Peak	Spacewatch	·	750 m	MPC · JPL
408392	2013 GX_{108}	—	September 25, 2006	Kitt Peak	Spacewatch	·	1.2 km	MPC · JPL
408393	2013 GG_{109}	—	December 17, 2001	Socorro	LINEAR	·	960 m	MPC · JPL
408394	2013 GQ_{109}	—	June 8, 2005	Siding Spring	SSS	EUN	1.7 km	MPC · JPL
408395	2013 GE_{111}	—	April 30, 2008	Mount Lemmon	Mount Lemmon Survey	·	2.0 km	MPC · JPL
408396	2013 GL_{111}	—	September 16, 2009	Catalina	CSS	·	3.9 km	MPC · JPL
408397	2013 GU_{111}	—	December 4, 2007	Mount Lemmon	Mount Lemmon Survey	·	1.6 km	MPC · JPL
408398	2013 GV_{111}	—	December 11, 2004	Kitt Peak	Spacewatch	ERI	1.7 km	MPC · JPL
408399	2013 GY_{111}	—	December 16, 2007	Mount Lemmon	Mount Lemmon Survey	·	1.4 km	MPC · JPL
408400	2013 GZ_{111}	—	November 18, 2011	Kitt Peak	Spacewatch	V	910 m	MPC · JPL

== 408401–408500 ==
back to top

Designation			Discovery			Properties		Ref
Permanent	Provisional	Named after	Date	Site	Discoverer(s)	Category	Diam.	Ref
408401	2013 GC_{112}	—	April 14, 2004	Anderson Mesa	LONEOS	·	2.6 km	MPC · JPL
408402	2013 GE_{112}	—	October 9, 2007	Mount Lemmon	Mount Lemmon Survey	V	680 m	MPC · JPL
408403	2013 GE_{113}	—	September 17, 2006	Kitt Peak	Spacewatch	EUN	1.4 km	MPC · JPL
408404	2013 GF_{113}	—	January 28, 2007	Mount Lemmon	Mount Lemmon Survey	·	2.4 km	MPC · JPL
408405	2013 GS_{113}	—	April 13, 2004	Kitt Peak	Spacewatch	·	1.6 km	MPC · JPL
408406	2013 GT_{113}	—	December 31, 2008	Catalina	CSS	·	710 m	MPC · JPL
408407	2013 GR_{122}	—	April 6, 2008	Kitt Peak	Spacewatch	·	1.6 km	MPC · JPL
408408	2013 GB_{123}	—	April 17, 2005	Kitt Peak	Spacewatch	·	970 m	MPC · JPL
408409	2013 GS_{123}	—	February 20, 2006	Mount Lemmon	Mount Lemmon Survey	·	760 m	MPC · JPL
408410	2013 GY_{124}	—	April 17, 2005	Kitt Peak	Spacewatch	·	910 m	MPC · JPL
408411	2013 GH_{127}	—	February 9, 2008	Kitt Peak	Spacewatch	·	1.5 km	MPC · JPL
408412	2013 GO_{127}	—	October 26, 2009	Kitt Peak	Spacewatch	·	3.2 km	MPC · JPL
408413	2013 GT_{127}	—	June 15, 2005	Kitt Peak	Spacewatch	·	1.4 km	MPC · JPL
408414	2013 GA_{130}	—	January 19, 2008	Kitt Peak	Spacewatch	·	2.0 km	MPC · JPL
408415	2013 GG_{134}	—	February 28, 2008	Mount Lemmon	Mount Lemmon Survey	·	1.6 km	MPC · JPL
408416	2013 GP_{134}	—	April 11, 2008	Kitt Peak	Spacewatch	·	2.0 km	MPC · JPL
408417	2013 GA_{135}	—	October 28, 2011	Mount Lemmon	Mount Lemmon Survey	·	970 m	MPC · JPL
408418	2013 GB_{135}	—	October 8, 2007	Mount Lemmon	Mount Lemmon Survey	·	1.2 km	MPC · JPL
408419	2013 HG	—	November 20, 2000	Anderson Mesa	LONEOS	H	680 m	MPC · JPL
408420	2013 HX	—	November 22, 2005	Kitt Peak	Spacewatch	LIX	5.4 km	MPC · JPL
408421	2013 HA_{1}	—	October 16, 2009	Mount Lemmon	Mount Lemmon Survey	·	2.6 km	MPC · JPL
408422	2013 HQ_{1}	—	May 25, 2006	Mount Lemmon	Mount Lemmon Survey	·	1.1 km	MPC · JPL
408423	2013 HV_{1}	—	November 26, 2003	Kitt Peak	Spacewatch	PHO	2.0 km	MPC · JPL
408424	2013 HE_{2}	—	October 28, 2010	Mount Lemmon	Mount Lemmon Survey	·	2.2 km	MPC · JPL
408425	2013 HX_{2}	—	January 4, 2012	Mount Lemmon	Mount Lemmon Survey	EUN	1.6 km	MPC · JPL
408426	2013 HX_{3}	—	November 1, 2011	Mount Lemmon	Mount Lemmon Survey	·	1.3 km	MPC · JPL
408427	2013 HD_{6}	—	March 26, 2007	Mount Lemmon	Mount Lemmon Survey	·	3.3 km	MPC · JPL
408428	2013 HO_{6}	—	March 15, 2008	Mount Lemmon	Mount Lemmon Survey	EOS	2.0 km	MPC · JPL
408429	2013 HO_{8}	—	May 16, 2009	Mount Lemmon	Mount Lemmon Survey	MAR	1.2 km	MPC · JPL
408430	2013 HS_{9}	—	November 1, 2005	Catalina	CSS	BRA	2.0 km	MPC · JPL
408431	2013 HH_{14}	—	October 9, 2002	Kitt Peak	Spacewatch	·	1.3 km	MPC · JPL
408432	2013 HK_{14}	—	September 13, 2007	Kitt Peak	Spacewatch	PHO	840 m	MPC · JPL
408433	2013 HL_{14}	—	February 19, 2012	Kitt Peak	Spacewatch	·	3.1 km	MPC · JPL
408434	2013 HO_{14}	—	November 30, 2011	Catalina	CSS	·	1.9 km	MPC · JPL
408435	2013 HR_{14}	—	October 22, 2005	Kitt Peak	Spacewatch	·	2.0 km	MPC · JPL
408436	2013 HJ_{15}	—	December 17, 2007	Mount Lemmon	Mount Lemmon Survey	EUN	1.8 km	MPC · JPL
408437	2013 HV_{15}	—	June 18, 2005	Mount Lemmon	Mount Lemmon Survey	·	1.5 km	MPC · JPL
408438	2013 HX_{15}	—	December 27, 2003	Kitt Peak	Spacewatch	·	1.4 km	MPC · JPL
408439	2013 HA_{16}	—	November 17, 2006	Kitt Peak	Spacewatch	(5)	1.8 km	MPC · JPL
408440	2013 HN_{21}	—	May 14, 2008	Mount Lemmon	Mount Lemmon Survey	·	2.6 km	MPC · JPL
408441	2013 HP_{21}	—	February 11, 2008	Kitt Peak	Spacewatch	AEO	990 m	MPC · JPL
408442	2013 HV_{21}	—	March 21, 2004	Kitt Peak	Spacewatch	·	1.9 km	MPC · JPL
408443	2013 HQ_{22}	—	September 17, 2006	Kitt Peak	Spacewatch	·	1.4 km	MPC · JPL
408444	2013 HZ_{22}	—	April 11, 2007	Catalina	CSS	·	4.9 km	MPC · JPL
408445	2013 HK_{23}	—	September 27, 2011	Mount Lemmon	Mount Lemmon Survey	·	1.8 km	MPC · JPL
408446	2013 HL_{23}	—	December 29, 2003	Anderson Mesa	LONEOS	EUN	1.5 km	MPC · JPL
408447	2013 HN_{23}	—	November 18, 2007	Mount Lemmon	Mount Lemmon Survey	·	1.4 km	MPC · JPL
408448	2013 HK_{24}	—	November 30, 2003	Kitt Peak	Spacewatch	·	940 m	MPC · JPL
408449	2013 HR_{25}	—	April 22, 2009	Kitt Peak	Spacewatch	EUN	1.3 km	MPC · JPL
408450	2013 HG_{26}	—	April 30, 2006	Kitt Peak	Spacewatch	·	1.1 km	MPC · JPL
408451	2013 HT_{26}	—	February 16, 2007	Catalina	CSS	EOS	2.5 km	MPC · JPL
408452	2013 HX_{26}	—	January 16, 2011	Mount Lemmon	Mount Lemmon Survey	·	3.0 km	MPC · JPL
408453	2013 HO_{27}	—	November 18, 2007	Mount Lemmon	Mount Lemmon Survey	·	1.1 km	MPC · JPL
408454	2013 HL_{28}	—	January 18, 2012	Mount Lemmon	Mount Lemmon Survey	·	2.1 km	MPC · JPL
408455	2013 HF_{34}	—	September 27, 2010	Kitt Peak	Spacewatch	·	1.7 km	MPC · JPL
408456	2013 HQ_{37}	—	September 14, 2007	Mount Lemmon	Mount Lemmon Survey	·	1.1 km	MPC · JPL
408457	2013 HT_{41}	—	March 9, 2008	Mount Lemmon	Mount Lemmon Survey	HOF	2.2 km	MPC · JPL
408458	2013 HC_{47}	—	January 30, 2012	Mount Lemmon	Mount Lemmon Survey	·	3.3 km	MPC · JPL
408459	2013 HR_{52}	—	January 20, 2009	Mount Lemmon	Mount Lemmon Survey	V	620 m	MPC · JPL
408460	2013 HB_{54}	—	March 9, 2007	Mount Lemmon	Mount Lemmon Survey	·	2.8 km	MPC · JPL
408461	2013 HC_{56}	—	April 29, 2009	Mount Lemmon	Mount Lemmon Survey	·	1.2 km	MPC · JPL
408462	2013 HE_{56}	—	March 13, 2008	Mount Lemmon	Mount Lemmon Survey	AGN	1.1 km	MPC · JPL
408463	2013 HR_{59}	—	September 16, 2010	Mount Lemmon	Mount Lemmon Survey	·	1.7 km	MPC · JPL
408464	2013 HW_{60}	—	January 1, 2009	Kitt Peak	Spacewatch	·	660 m	MPC · JPL
408465	2013 HP_{62}	—	February 9, 2008	Kitt Peak	Spacewatch	·	1.6 km	MPC · JPL
408466	2013 HE_{64}	—	October 22, 2011	Kitt Peak	Spacewatch	V	710 m	MPC · JPL
408467	2013 HR_{65}	—	September 10, 2007	Mount Lemmon	Mount Lemmon Survey	·	800 m	MPC · JPL
408468	2013 HU_{68}	—	April 7, 1999	Kitt Peak	Spacewatch	·	870 m	MPC · JPL
408469	2013 HH_{71}	—	March 28, 2008	Mount Lemmon	Mount Lemmon Survey	AGN	990 m	MPC · JPL
408470	2013 HG_{76}	—	September 25, 2006	Kitt Peak	Spacewatch	·	950 m	MPC · JPL
408471	2013 HG_{79}	—	September 7, 2004	Kitt Peak	Spacewatch	·	1.5 km	MPC · JPL
408472	2013 HY_{80}	—	September 29, 2005	Mount Lemmon	Mount Lemmon Survey	·	1.5 km	MPC · JPL
408473	2013 HP_{82}	—	September 7, 2001	Socorro	LINEAR	·	1.6 km	MPC · JPL
408474	2013 HY_{87}	—	October 29, 2010	Mount Lemmon	Mount Lemmon Survey	·	1.5 km	MPC · JPL
408475	2013 HP_{92}	—	April 4, 2008	Kitt Peak	Spacewatch	·	1.4 km	MPC · JPL
408476	2013 HC_{93}	—	February 20, 2009	Kitt Peak	Spacewatch	MAR	1.1 km	MPC · JPL
408477	2013 HM_{99}	—	September 18, 2010	Mount Lemmon	Mount Lemmon Survey	NEM	2.0 km	MPC · JPL
408478	2013 HW_{102}	—	February 10, 2008	Kitt Peak	Spacewatch	·	1.7 km	MPC · JPL
408479	2013 HU_{105}	—	November 19, 2003	Kitt Peak	Spacewatch	MAS	580 m	MPC · JPL
408480	2013 HX_{115}	—	September 16, 2009	Mount Lemmon	Mount Lemmon Survey	·	1.2 km	MPC · JPL
408481	2013 HQ_{117}	—	October 27, 2011	Mount Lemmon	Mount Lemmon Survey	·	800 m	MPC · JPL
408482	2013 HO_{121}	—	February 10, 2008	Kitt Peak	Spacewatch	WIT	880 m	MPC · JPL
408483	2013 HF_{138}	—	March 29, 2000	Kitt Peak	Spacewatch	·	1.6 km	MPC · JPL
408484	2013 HW_{142}	—	March 11, 2005	Mount Lemmon	Mount Lemmon Survey	V	630 m	MPC · JPL
408485	2013 JS_{5}	—	September 16, 2009	Kitt Peak	Spacewatch	·	2.5 km	MPC · JPL
408486	2013 JN_{6}	—	November 19, 2008	Mount Lemmon	Mount Lemmon Survey	BAP	790 m	MPC · JPL
408487	2013 JP_{8}	—	March 4, 2008	Kitt Peak	Spacewatch	·	1.7 km	MPC · JPL
408488	2013 JY_{8}	—	March 15, 2008	Kitt Peak	Spacewatch	·	1.6 km	MPC · JPL
408489	2013 JC_{9}	—	January 31, 2006	Mount Lemmon	Mount Lemmon Survey	·	720 m	MPC · JPL
408490	2013 JG_{9}	—	November 17, 2006	Mount Lemmon	Mount Lemmon Survey	·	1.9 km	MPC · JPL
408491	2013 JV_{10}	—	April 12, 2005	Kitt Peak	Spacewatch	·	1.4 km	MPC · JPL
408492	2013 JG_{11}	—	February 28, 2008	Mount Lemmon	Mount Lemmon Survey	·	1.9 km	MPC · JPL
408493	2013 JW_{13}	—	March 4, 2008	Mount Lemmon	Mount Lemmon Survey	·	2.2 km	MPC · JPL
408494	2013 JR_{15}	—	November 6, 2005	Kitt Peak	Spacewatch	·	2.8 km	MPC · JPL
408495	2013 JA_{19}	—	December 25, 2005	Kitt Peak	Spacewatch	·	2.3 km	MPC · JPL
408496	2013 JK_{19}	—	May 10, 2002	Kitt Peak	Spacewatch	·	3.4 km	MPC · JPL
408497	2013 JV_{20}	—	March 12, 2007	Mount Lemmon	Mount Lemmon Survey	·	2.5 km	MPC · JPL
408498	2013 JE_{21}	—	October 21, 2003	Palomar	NEAT	PHO	1.1 km	MPC · JPL
408499	2013 JP_{21}	—	January 2, 2012	Kitt Peak	Spacewatch	·	2.1 km	MPC · JPL
408500	2013 JV_{21}	—	March 5, 2008	Mount Lemmon	Mount Lemmon Survey	·	1.7 km	MPC · JPL

== 408501–408600 ==
back to top

Designation			Discovery			Properties		Ref
Permanent	Provisional	Named after	Date	Site	Discoverer(s)	Category	Diam.	Ref
408501	2013 JO_{24}	—	March 11, 2007	Kitt Peak	Spacewatch	·	2.3 km	MPC · JPL
408502	2013 JP_{24}	—	October 6, 1999	Kitt Peak	Spacewatch	EOS	1.7 km	MPC · JPL
408503	2013 JT_{24}	—	March 3, 2000	Socorro	LINEAR	·	1.5 km	MPC · JPL
408504	2013 JM_{25}	—	November 23, 2006	Mount Lemmon	Mount Lemmon Survey	·	1.6 km	MPC · JPL
408505	2013 JZ_{25}	—	March 9, 2007	Kitt Peak	Spacewatch	·	2.4 km	MPC · JPL
408506	2013 JJ_{26}	—	February 2, 2006	Mount Lemmon	Mount Lemmon Survey	·	3.0 km	MPC · JPL
408507	2013 JK_{27}	—	March 15, 2004	Kitt Peak	Spacewatch	·	1.4 km	MPC · JPL
408508	2013 JA_{28}	—	August 19, 2009	Kitt Peak	Spacewatch	·	1.9 km	MPC · JPL
408509	2013 JW_{30}	—	February 27, 2006	Kitt Peak	Spacewatch	·	1.1 km	MPC · JPL
408510	2013 JO_{31}	—	March 25, 2000	Kitt Peak	Spacewatch	·	1.6 km	MPC · JPL
408511	2013 JS_{32}	—	December 20, 2004	Mount Lemmon	Mount Lemmon Survey	·	4.6 km	MPC · JPL
408512	2013 JT_{32}	—	July 2, 2008	Kitt Peak	Spacewatch	·	3.1 km	MPC · JPL
408513	2013 JO_{36}	—	February 23, 2007	Mount Lemmon	Mount Lemmon Survey	·	2.2 km	MPC · JPL
408514	2013 JT_{36}	—	March 20, 2007	Mount Lemmon	Mount Lemmon Survey	EOS	2.1 km	MPC · JPL
408515	2013 JY_{36}	—	April 16, 2007	Catalina	CSS	·	4.3 km	MPC · JPL
408516	2013 JF_{37}	—	June 18, 2005	Mount Lemmon	Mount Lemmon Survey	·	1.7 km	MPC · JPL
408517	2013 JK_{37}	—	April 30, 2008	Mount Lemmon	Mount Lemmon Survey	TIR	3.4 km	MPC · JPL
408518	2013 JZ_{37}	—	January 27, 2010	WISE	WISE	EUP	4.1 km	MPC · JPL
408519	2013 JB_{38}	—	March 5, 2006	Mount Lemmon	Mount Lemmon Survey	·	3.8 km	MPC · JPL
408520	2013 JC_{38}	—	November 17, 2006	Mount Lemmon	Mount Lemmon Survey	·	2.1 km	MPC · JPL
408521	2013 JB_{39}	—	December 26, 2011	Kitt Peak	Spacewatch	·	1.9 km	MPC · JPL
408522	2013 JQ_{39}	—	September 30, 2005	Mount Lemmon	Mount Lemmon Survey	·	2.2 km	MPC · JPL
408523	2013 JK_{40}	—	February 23, 2007	Mount Lemmon	Mount Lemmon Survey	·	2.5 km	MPC · JPL
408524	2013 JS_{41}	—	January 31, 1995	Kitt Peak	Spacewatch	·	770 m	MPC · JPL
408525	2013 JR_{43}	—	March 12, 2007	Kitt Peak	Spacewatch	EOS	2.1 km	MPC · JPL
408526	2013 JV_{43}	—	August 29, 2005	Kitt Peak	Spacewatch	·	1.8 km	MPC · JPL
408527	2013 JZ_{43}	—	September 17, 2006	Kitt Peak	Spacewatch	·	2.0 km	MPC · JPL
408528	2013 JP_{46}	—	September 12, 2004	Kitt Peak	Spacewatch	EOS	2.0 km	MPC · JPL
408529	2013 JB_{47}	—	September 22, 2009	Kitt Peak	Spacewatch	EOS	2.0 km	MPC · JPL
408530	2013 JP_{47}	—	March 13, 2007	Mount Lemmon	Mount Lemmon Survey	·	2.3 km	MPC · JPL
408531	2013 JB_{48}	—	March 9, 2002	Kitt Peak	Spacewatch	·	1.2 km	MPC · JPL
408532	2013 JF_{48}	—	November 6, 2010	Catalina	CSS	·	1.8 km	MPC · JPL
408533	2013 JR_{48}	—	September 30, 2010	Mount Lemmon	Mount Lemmon Survey	·	1.8 km	MPC · JPL
408534	2013 JD_{51}	—	July 28, 2008	Siding Spring	SSS	·	3.2 km	MPC · JPL
408535	2013 JR_{51}	—	April 25, 2006	Kitt Peak	Spacewatch	V	600 m	MPC · JPL
408536	2013 JN_{52}	—	March 11, 2003	Kitt Peak	Spacewatch	AGN	1.5 km	MPC · JPL
408537	2013 JX_{53}	—	August 21, 2006	Kitt Peak	Spacewatch	·	1.4 km	MPC · JPL
408538	2013 JY_{53}	—	July 17, 2009	Siding Spring	SSS	·	2.9 km	MPC · JPL
408539	2013 JO_{54}	—	April 20, 2004	Kitt Peak	Spacewatch	·	1.8 km	MPC · JPL
408540	2013 JT_{54}	—	February 13, 2007	Mount Lemmon	Mount Lemmon Survey	·	1.6 km	MPC · JPL
408541	2013 JE_{55}	—	September 4, 2008	Kitt Peak	Spacewatch	·	2.9 km	MPC · JPL
408542	2013 JL_{55}	—	April 10, 2002	Socorro	LINEAR	·	2.6 km	MPC · JPL
408543	2013 JH_{60}	—	January 15, 2005	Socorro	LINEAR	V	780 m	MPC · JPL
408544	2013 JJ_{60}	—	March 13, 2007	Kitt Peak	Spacewatch	·	2.9 km	MPC · JPL
408545	2013 JT_{60}	—	September 26, 2006	Kitt Peak	Spacewatch	·	1.4 km	MPC · JPL
408546	2013 JN_{61}	—	November 17, 1999	Kitt Peak	Spacewatch	·	1.6 km	MPC · JPL
408547	2013 JX_{61}	—	October 18, 1998	Kitt Peak	Spacewatch	·	3.0 km	MPC · JPL
408548	2013 KQ_{3}	—	September 26, 2006	Mount Lemmon	Mount Lemmon Survey	·	1.4 km	MPC · JPL
408549	2013 KM_{5}	—	March 11, 2005	Kitt Peak	Spacewatch	·	1.4 km	MPC · JPL
408550	2013 KW_{5}	—	November 20, 2004	Kitt Peak	Spacewatch	·	910 m	MPC · JPL
408551	2013 KG_{8}	—	March 8, 2008	Catalina	CSS	·	2.1 km	MPC · JPL
408552	2013 KH_{8}	—	December 22, 2000	Kitt Peak	Spacewatch	·	3.9 km	MPC · JPL
408553	2013 KM_{8}	—	April 8, 2002	Kitt Peak	Spacewatch	THM	2.8 km	MPC · JPL
408554	2013 KR_{9}	—	October 23, 2005	Kitt Peak	Spacewatch	·	2.2 km	MPC · JPL
408555	2013 KK_{10}	—	March 16, 2007	Kitt Peak	Spacewatch	·	2.6 km	MPC · JPL
408556	2013 KB_{11}	—	November 16, 2006	Kitt Peak	Spacewatch	·	1.5 km	MPC · JPL
408557	2013 KQ_{11}	—	April 12, 2002	Kitt Peak	Spacewatch	·	2.0 km	MPC · JPL
408558	2013 KP_{12}	—	December 29, 2011	Mount Lemmon	Mount Lemmon Survey	MAR	1.3 km	MPC · JPL
408559	2013 KT_{12}	—	August 21, 2006	Kitt Peak	Spacewatch	·	1.8 km	MPC · JPL
408560	2013 KA_{14}	—	May 8, 2008	Mount Lemmon	Mount Lemmon Survey	EOS	1.9 km	MPC · JPL
408561	2013 KC_{14}	—	December 16, 1999	Kitt Peak	Spacewatch	·	3.0 km	MPC · JPL
408562	2013 KJ_{14}	—	October 31, 1999	Kitt Peak	Spacewatch	·	2.1 km	MPC · JPL
408563	2013 KD_{15}	—	April 20, 2007	Kitt Peak	Spacewatch	·	2.9 km	MPC · JPL
408564	2013 KJ_{17}	—	January 7, 2006	Kitt Peak	Spacewatch	·	3.7 km	MPC · JPL
408565	2013 KQ_{18}	—	December 30, 2005	Kitt Peak	Spacewatch	T_{j} (2.99) · EUP	4.0 km	MPC · JPL
408566	2013 LR_{1}	—	May 19, 2006	Mount Lemmon	Mount Lemmon Survey	(2076)	890 m	MPC · JPL
408567	2013 LL_{3}	—	August 16, 2009	Kitt Peak	Spacewatch	·	2.2 km	MPC · JPL
408568	2013 LL_{4}	—	May 1, 2000	Socorro	LINEAR	·	2.2 km	MPC · JPL
408569	2013 LG_{5}	—	November 20, 2006	Kitt Peak	Spacewatch	(5)	1.5 km	MPC · JPL
408570	2013 LO_{5}	—	July 3, 1997	Kitt Peak	Spacewatch	EUN	1.4 km	MPC · JPL
408571	2013 LP_{5}	—	December 12, 2006	Mount Lemmon	Mount Lemmon Survey	(18466)	2.7 km	MPC · JPL
408572	2013 LU_{5}	—	November 10, 2004	Kitt Peak	Spacewatch	·	3.8 km	MPC · JPL
408573	2013 LH_{6}	—	June 8, 2005	Kitt Peak	Spacewatch	·	1.5 km	MPC · JPL
408574	2013 LA_{7}	—	January 22, 2010	WISE	WISE	·	4.7 km	MPC · JPL
408575	2013 LG_{8}	—	November 4, 2004	Kitt Peak	Spacewatch	·	3.5 km	MPC · JPL
408576	2013 LK_{11}	—	April 14, 2008	Kitt Peak	Spacewatch	·	2.1 km	MPC · JPL
408577	2013 LU_{11}	—	February 17, 2007	Mount Lemmon	Mount Lemmon Survey	·	1.8 km	MPC · JPL
408578	2013 LK_{13}	—	September 14, 2005	Kitt Peak	Spacewatch	·	1.7 km	MPC · JPL
408579	2013 LR_{16}	—	November 4, 2004	Kitt Peak	Spacewatch	·	3.7 km	MPC · JPL
408580	2013 LN_{18}	—	February 12, 2008	Mount Lemmon	Mount Lemmon Survey	·	2.3 km	MPC · JPL
408581	2013 LR_{18}	—	September 16, 2004	Kitt Peak	Spacewatch	·	4.9 km	MPC · JPL
408582	2013 LB_{19}	—	March 13, 2008	Kitt Peak	Spacewatch	·	1.6 km	MPC · JPL
408583	2013 LT_{20}	—	April 22, 2007	Catalina	CSS	URS	3.8 km	MPC · JPL
408584	2013 LK_{22}	—	September 17, 2010	Kitt Peak	Spacewatch	·	1.3 km	MPC · JPL
408585	2013 LW_{22}	—	October 1, 2005	Kitt Peak	Spacewatch	·	1.8 km	MPC · JPL
408586	2013 LL_{23}	—	February 17, 2001	Kitt Peak	Spacewatch	·	3.1 km	MPC · JPL
408587	2013 LV_{24}	—	February 19, 2012	Kitt Peak	Spacewatch	·	2.4 km	MPC · JPL
408588	2013 LZ_{24}	—	March 23, 2012	Mount Lemmon	Mount Lemmon Survey	EOS	2.2 km	MPC · JPL
408589	2013 LZ_{25}	—	May 31, 2008	Mount Lemmon	Mount Lemmon Survey	·	2.6 km	MPC · JPL
408590	2013 LP_{26}	—	March 10, 2007	Mount Lemmon	Mount Lemmon Survey	·	1.9 km	MPC · JPL
408591	2013 LA_{32}	—	December 10, 2010	Mount Lemmon	Mount Lemmon Survey	EOS	2.1 km	MPC · JPL
408592	2013 LE_{32}	—	April 16, 2007	Catalina	CSS	·	4.0 km	MPC · JPL
408593	2013 LG_{32}	—	December 7, 2005	Kitt Peak	Spacewatch	BRA	1.5 km	MPC · JPL
408594	2013 LJ_{32}	—	April 15, 2007	Kitt Peak	Spacewatch	·	3.1 km	MPC · JPL
408595	2013 LP_{33}	—	November 26, 2011	Mount Lemmon	Mount Lemmon Survey	·	1.5 km	MPC · JPL
408596	2013 LG_{34}	—	September 28, 2006	Kitt Peak	Spacewatch	·	1.8 km	MPC · JPL
408597	2013 LB_{35}	—	September 29, 2009	Mount Lemmon	Mount Lemmon Survey	·	2.6 km	MPC · JPL
408598	2013 MB_{2}	—	November 6, 2005	Kitt Peak	Spacewatch	·	3.5 km	MPC · JPL
408599	2013 MJ_{2}	—	December 2, 2010	Mount Lemmon	Mount Lemmon Survey	·	2.7 km	MPC · JPL
408600	2013 ME_{6}	—	February 21, 2007	Kitt Peak	Spacewatch	·	2.8 km	MPC · JPL

== 408601–408700 ==
back to top

Designation			Discovery			Properties		Ref
Permanent	Provisional	Named after	Date	Site	Discoverer(s)	Category	Diam.	Ref
408601	2013 MV_{11}	—	March 27, 1995	Kitt Peak	Spacewatch	·	4.4 km	MPC · JPL
408602	2013 NN_{1}	—	September 20, 2006	Catalina	CSS	T_{j} (2.99) · 3:2	6.7 km	MPC · JPL
408603	2013 OC_{7}	—	October 1, 2005	Kitt Peak	Spacewatch	·	1.7 km	MPC · JPL
408604	2013 OG_{10}	—	August 21, 2008	Kitt Peak	Spacewatch	·	3.0 km	MPC · JPL
408605	2013 QB_{19}	—	February 15, 1994	Kitt Peak	Spacewatch	·	3.4 km	MPC · JPL
408606	2013 QY_{25}	—	January 8, 2006	Kitt Peak	Spacewatch	·	4.1 km	MPC · JPL
408607	2013 QF_{26}	—	February 10, 2010	Kitt Peak	Spacewatch	SYL · CYB	5.1 km	MPC · JPL
408608	2013 QK_{49}	—	March 25, 2006	Mount Lemmon	Mount Lemmon Survey	(21885)	2.7 km	MPC · JPL
408609	2013 RA_{73}	—	March 26, 2007	Mount Lemmon	Mount Lemmon Survey	L5	9.4 km	MPC · JPL
408610	2013 TA_{40}	—	March 13, 2005	Kitt Peak	Spacewatch	·	3.4 km	MPC · JPL
408611	2013 YO_{16}	—	October 6, 2008	Mount Lemmon	Mount Lemmon Survey	·	1.4 km	MPC · JPL
408612	2014 FE_{30}	—	March 12, 2010	Catalina	CSS	·	2.2 km	MPC · JPL
408613	2014 GT_{16}	—	March 11, 2011	Mount Lemmon	Mount Lemmon Survey	H	440 m	MPC · JPL
408614	2014 HM_{164}	—	May 5, 2003	Kitt Peak	Spacewatch	·	3.2 km	MPC · JPL
408615	2014 KJ_{16}	—	October 14, 1998	Kitt Peak	Spacewatch	·	580 m	MPC · JPL
408616	2014 KT_{33}	—	April 14, 2005	Catalina	CSS	·	2.1 km	MPC · JPL
408617	2014 KQ_{34}	—	November 23, 2006	Mount Lemmon	Mount Lemmon Survey	·	5.9 km	MPC · JPL
408618	2014 KT_{42}	—	October 20, 2007	Mount Lemmon	Mount Lemmon Survey	·	2.1 km	MPC · JPL
408619	2014 KK_{53}	—	October 25, 2005	Kitt Peak	Spacewatch	·	2.3 km	MPC · JPL
408620	2014 KB_{56}	—	April 6, 2005	Mount Lemmon	Mount Lemmon Survey	·	1.4 km	MPC · JPL
408621	2014 KN_{57}	—	April 25, 2007	Kitt Peak	Spacewatch	·	700 m	MPC · JPL
408622	2014 KQ_{65}	—	October 22, 2005	Kitt Peak	Spacewatch	·	3.7 km	MPC · JPL
408623	2014 KO_{70}	—	January 13, 2008	Mount Lemmon	Mount Lemmon Survey	·	2.2 km	MPC · JPL
408624	2014 KS_{71}	—	July 11, 2004	Socorro	LINEAR	·	1.8 km	MPC · JPL
408625	2014 KN_{74}	—	October 25, 2005	Kitt Peak	Spacewatch	·	2.8 km	MPC · JPL
408626	2014 KP_{89}	—	January 16, 2009	Kitt Peak	Spacewatch	·	1.6 km	MPC · JPL
408627	2014 KO_{93}	—	March 30, 2008	Kitt Peak	Spacewatch	·	3.4 km	MPC · JPL
408628	2014 KO_{94}	—	April 14, 2008	Mount Lemmon	Mount Lemmon Survey	·	3.2 km	MPC · JPL
408629	2014 KM_{99}	—	December 4, 2008	Mount Lemmon	Mount Lemmon Survey	V	760 m	MPC · JPL
408630	2014 LC_{11}	—	September 16, 2001	Socorro	LINEAR	·	590 m	MPC · JPL
408631	2014 LD_{11}	—	January 9, 2006	Kitt Peak	Spacewatch	·	1.9 km	MPC · JPL
408632	2014 LE_{12}	—	July 20, 2001	Anderson Mesa	LONEOS	·	690 m	MPC · JPL
408633	2014 LF_{13}	—	April 11, 2005	Kitt Peak	Spacewatch	·	1.6 km	MPC · JPL
408634	2014 LO_{16}	—	January 28, 2007	Mount Lemmon	Mount Lemmon Survey	·	3.3 km	MPC · JPL
408635	2014 LQ_{17}	—	February 8, 2007	Kitt Peak	Spacewatch	·	3.1 km	MPC · JPL
408636	2014 LL_{19}	—	March 16, 2010	Kitt Peak	Spacewatch	·	1.4 km	MPC · JPL
408637	2014 LO_{25}	—	September 27, 2006	Catalina	CSS	·	3.7 km	MPC · JPL
408638	2014 MJ_{1}	—	October 3, 2006	Mount Lemmon	Mount Lemmon Survey	·	2.4 km	MPC · JPL
408639	2014 MC_{4}	—	December 15, 2001	Socorro	LINEAR	·	1.9 km	MPC · JPL
408640	2014 MM_{4}	—	March 8, 2008	Mount Lemmon	Mount Lemmon Survey	·	2.2 km	MPC · JPL
408641	2014 MX_{7}	—	April 7, 2005	Kitt Peak	Spacewatch	·	1.4 km	MPC · JPL
408642	2014 MT_{9}	—	July 6, 2010	WISE	WISE	·	3.1 km	MPC · JPL
408643	2014 MR_{10}	—	January 11, 2008	Mount Lemmon	Mount Lemmon Survey	EUN	1.5 km	MPC · JPL
408644	2014 MS_{13}	—	January 10, 2008	Mount Lemmon	Mount Lemmon Survey	·	1.8 km	MPC · JPL
408645	2014 MV_{13}	—	September 1, 2005	Kitt Peak	Spacewatch	·	1.8 km	MPC · JPL
408646	2014 MB_{14}	—	January 28, 2007	Mount Lemmon	Mount Lemmon Survey	·	3.7 km	MPC · JPL
408647	2014 MG_{14}	—	February 25, 2006	Kitt Peak	Spacewatch	·	1.1 km	MPC · JPL
408648	2014 MA_{15}	—	August 21, 2003	Campo Imperatore	CINEOS	VER	3.1 km	MPC · JPL
408649	2014 MB_{15}	—	October 21, 2011	Mount Lemmon	Mount Lemmon Survey	·	1.2 km	MPC · JPL
408650	2014 MC_{15}	—	September 16, 2009	Catalina	CSS	·	2.2 km	MPC · JPL
408651	2014 MN_{15}	—	May 9, 2005	Kitt Peak	Spacewatch	·	1.9 km	MPC · JPL
408652	2014 MO_{15}	—	November 8, 2008	Kitt Peak	Spacewatch	·	1.0 km	MPC · JPL
408653	2014 MQ_{15}	—	March 11, 2008	Kitt Peak	Spacewatch	·	3.0 km	MPC · JPL
408654	2014 MX_{19}	—	November 7, 2008	Mount Lemmon	Mount Lemmon Survey	·	930 m	MPC · JPL
408655	2014 MD_{20}	—	June 20, 2007	Kitt Peak	Spacewatch	·	940 m	MPC · JPL
408656	2014 ML_{20}	—	July 21, 2004	Siding Spring	SSS	·	710 m	MPC · JPL
408657	2014 MO_{20}	—	February 17, 2010	Kitt Peak	Spacewatch	·	670 m	MPC · JPL
408658	2014 MV_{20}	—	December 24, 2005	Kitt Peak	Spacewatch	·	810 m	MPC · JPL
408659	2014 ME_{24}	—	May 4, 2009	Mount Lemmon	Mount Lemmon Survey	·	2.2 km	MPC · JPL
408660	2014 MJ_{24}	—	June 18, 2006	Kitt Peak	Spacewatch	·	1.1 km	MPC · JPL
408661	2014 MS_{24}	—	February 2, 2006	Mount Lemmon	Mount Lemmon Survey	NYS	1.1 km	MPC · JPL
408662	2014 MG_{25}	—	April 14, 2008	Kitt Peak	Spacewatch	·	2.2 km	MPC · JPL
408663	2014 MS_{25}	—	July 7, 2010	Kitt Peak	Spacewatch	EUN	1.3 km	MPC · JPL
408664	2014 MC_{26}	—	July 5, 2005	Kitt Peak	Spacewatch	·	2.0 km	MPC · JPL
408665	2014 MF_{28}	—	May 1, 2009	Mount Lemmon	Mount Lemmon Survey	·	1.6 km	MPC · JPL
408666	2014 MT_{28}	—	July 20, 2009	Siding Spring	SSS	·	4.3 km	MPC · JPL
408667	2014 MU_{30}	—	April 9, 2010	Kitt Peak	Spacewatch	·	710 m	MPC · JPL
408668	2014 MM_{31}	—	March 30, 2009	Mount Lemmon	Mount Lemmon Survey	·	3.5 km	MPC · JPL
408669	2014 MX_{31}	—	December 29, 2005	Mount Lemmon	Mount Lemmon Survey	(1118)	3.7 km	MPC · JPL
408670	2014 MA_{37}	—	December 31, 2007	Mount Lemmon	Mount Lemmon Survey	·	1.6 km	MPC · JPL
408671	2014 MB_{37}	—	September 19, 2006	Catalina	CSS	·	1.3 km	MPC · JPL
408672	2014 MN_{37}	—	December 21, 2008	Mount Lemmon	Mount Lemmon Survey	·	1.4 km	MPC · JPL
408673	2014 MB_{38}	—	March 10, 2008	Mount Lemmon	Mount Lemmon Survey	·	2.7 km	MPC · JPL
408674	2014 MC_{38}	—	May 29, 2008	Kitt Peak	Spacewatch	·	2.1 km	MPC · JPL
408675	2014 MG_{38}	—	January 12, 1996	Kitt Peak	Spacewatch	·	2.3 km	MPC · JPL
408676	2014 MK_{38}	—	June 15, 2010	WISE	WISE	·	2.3 km	MPC · JPL
408677	2014 MM_{38}	—	August 22, 2004	Kitt Peak	Spacewatch	·	2.2 km	MPC · JPL
408678	2014 MS_{38}	—	February 4, 2006	Mount Lemmon	Mount Lemmon Survey	·	3.0 km	MPC · JPL
408679	2014 MA_{39}	—	March 18, 2001	Kitt Peak	Spacewatch	·	1.4 km	MPC · JPL
408680	2014 MO_{39}	—	March 18, 2010	Mount Lemmon	Mount Lemmon Survey	·	710 m	MPC · JPL
408681	2014 MX_{39}	—	December 2, 2010	Mount Lemmon	Mount Lemmon Survey	VER	3.0 km	MPC · JPL
408682	2014 MA_{43}	—	October 14, 2004	Kitt Peak	Spacewatch	·	2.8 km	MPC · JPL
408683	2014 MM_{43}	—	November 25, 2006	Mount Lemmon	Mount Lemmon Survey	·	1.8 km	MPC · JPL
408684	2014 MR_{47}	—	November 30, 2011	Mount Lemmon	Mount Lemmon Survey	EOS	2.1 km	MPC · JPL
408685	2014 MN_{49}	—	September 4, 2010	Kitt Peak	Spacewatch	·	1.4 km	MPC · JPL
408686	2014 MQ_{49}	—	April 10, 2005	Kitt Peak	Spacewatch	·	1.6 km	MPC · JPL
408687	2014 MA_{50}	—	March 17, 2005	Kitt Peak	Spacewatch	MAR	1.1 km	MPC · JPL
408688	2014 MU_{52}	—	October 3, 2006	Catalina	CSS	·	1.9 km	MPC · JPL
408689	2014 MT_{54}	—	August 23, 2001	Kitt Peak	Spacewatch	·	2.1 km	MPC · JPL
408690	2014 MS_{56}	—	September 25, 2009	Catalina	CSS	·	3.4 km	MPC · JPL
408691	2014 MX_{56}	—	September 18, 2010	Mount Lemmon	Mount Lemmon Survey	AGN	980 m	MPC · JPL
408692	2014 MR_{57}	—	October 2, 2009	Mount Lemmon	Mount Lemmon Survey	·	3.3 km	MPC · JPL
408693	2014 MM_{61}	—	February 9, 2008	Catalina	CSS	·	2.5 km	MPC · JPL
408694	2014 MT_{61}	—	November 8, 2007	Kitt Peak	Spacewatch	·	1.5 km	MPC · JPL
408695	2014 MT_{62}	—	November 2, 2008	Mount Lemmon	Mount Lemmon Survey	·	1.3 km	MPC · JPL
408696	2014 ME_{63}	—	February 11, 2008	Kitt Peak	Spacewatch	·	1.7 km	MPC · JPL
408697	2014 MX_{63}	—	March 29, 1995	Kitt Peak	Spacewatch	·	980 m	MPC · JPL
408698	2014 ML_{64}	—	March 17, 2004	Kitt Peak	Spacewatch	·	1.9 km	MPC · JPL
408699	2014 MS_{68}	—	March 16, 2005	Catalina	CSS	·	1.8 km	MPC · JPL
408700	2014 ND_{12}	—	November 7, 2008	Kitt Peak	Spacewatch	·	770 m	MPC · JPL

== 408701–408800 ==
back to top

Designation			Discovery			Properties		Ref
Permanent	Provisional	Named after	Date	Site	Discoverer(s)	Category	Diam.	Ref
408701	2014 NZ_{30}	—	November 8, 2008	Kitt Peak	Spacewatch	·	690 m	MPC · JPL
408702	2014 ND_{31}	—	March 3, 2005	Kitt Peak	Spacewatch	·	1.2 km	MPC · JPL
408703	2014 NF_{31}	—	January 25, 2006	Kitt Peak	Spacewatch	·	3.6 km	MPC · JPL
408704	2014 NG_{31}	—	January 13, 2005	Catalina	CSS	T_{j} (2.99) · EUP	4.4 km	MPC · JPL
408705	2014 NG_{33}	—	September 17, 2010	Mount Lemmon	Mount Lemmon Survey	·	1.4 km	MPC · JPL
408706	2014 NT_{33}	—	December 10, 2010	Mount Lemmon	Mount Lemmon Survey	·	2.3 km	MPC · JPL
408707	2014 NB_{48}	—	November 26, 2005	Kitt Peak	Spacewatch	EOS	2.5 km	MPC · JPL
408708	2014 NX_{49}	—	December 25, 2005	Kitt Peak	Spacewatch	·	910 m	MPC · JPL
408709	2014 NW_{52}	—	December 28, 2005	Kitt Peak	Spacewatch	·	720 m	MPC · JPL
408710	2014 NP_{53}	—	May 7, 2010	Kitt Peak	Spacewatch	NYS	1.2 km	MPC · JPL
408711	2014 NB_{54}	—	August 28, 2006	Catalina	CSS	·	680 m	MPC · JPL
408712	2014 NL_{54}	—	May 11, 2010	Mount Lemmon	Mount Lemmon Survey	·	860 m	MPC · JPL
408713	2014 NR_{59}	—	June 13, 2007	Kitt Peak	Spacewatch	·	920 m	MPC · JPL
408714	2014 NY_{61}	—	September 8, 2004	Socorro	LINEAR	EOS	2.5 km	MPC · JPL
408715	2014 OJ_{4}	—	October 26, 2008	Kitt Peak	Spacewatch	·	670 m	MPC · JPL
408716	2014 OS_{4}	—	September 25, 2009	Mount Lemmon	Mount Lemmon Survey	·	2.9 km	MPC · JPL
408717	2014 OK_{15}	—	March 31, 2003	Anderson Mesa	LONEOS	·	1.5 km	MPC · JPL
408718	2014 OO_{16}	—	September 20, 2006	Kitt Peak	Spacewatch	·	1.6 km	MPC · JPL
408719	2014 OL_{17}	—	September 16, 2010	Kitt Peak	Spacewatch	AGN	1.2 km	MPC · JPL
408720	2014 OY_{18}	—	April 7, 2008	Mount Lemmon	Mount Lemmon Survey	KOR	1.3 km	MPC · JPL
408721	2014 OC_{22}	—	September 15, 2004	Kitt Peak	Spacewatch	·	1.6 km	MPC · JPL
408722	2014 OE_{28}	—	March 14, 2010	Mount Lemmon	Mount Lemmon Survey	·	680 m	MPC · JPL
408723	2014 OY_{32}	—	February 7, 2008	Mount Lemmon	Mount Lemmon Survey	AGN	1.0 km	MPC · JPL
408724	2014 OR_{33}	—	December 7, 2005	Kitt Peak	Spacewatch	EOS	1.8 km	MPC · JPL
408725	2014 OL_{36}	—	March 4, 2006	Kitt Peak	Spacewatch	·	1.1 km	MPC · JPL
408726	2014 OG_{41}	—	March 14, 2010	Kitt Peak	Spacewatch	·	630 m	MPC · JPL
408727	2014 ON_{42}	—	December 14, 2010	Mount Lemmon	Mount Lemmon Survey	EOS	2.4 km	MPC · JPL
408728	2014 OL_{47}	—	January 19, 2004	Kitt Peak	Spacewatch	·	1.7 km	MPC · JPL
408729	2014 OF_{49}	—	January 21, 1993	Kitt Peak	Spacewatch	·	1.2 km	MPC · JPL
408730	2014 OJ_{49}	—	October 28, 2005	Mount Lemmon	Mount Lemmon Survey	KOR	1.3 km	MPC · JPL
408731	2014 OF_{52}	—	May 25, 2009	Kitt Peak	Spacewatch	·	1.2 km	MPC · JPL
408732	2014 OT_{56}	—	October 1, 2005	Kitt Peak	Spacewatch	KOR	1.5 km	MPC · JPL
408733	2014 OO_{59}	—	April 15, 2007	Kitt Peak	Spacewatch	·	750 m	MPC · JPL
408734	2014 OB_{63}	—	December 1, 2008	Kitt Peak	Spacewatch	V	730 m	MPC · JPL
408735	2014 OX_{65}	—	April 21, 2004	Socorro	LINEAR	·	640 m	MPC · JPL
408736	2014 OB_{66}	—	February 15, 1994	Kitt Peak	Spacewatch	·	1.7 km	MPC · JPL
408737	2014 OE_{66}	—	February 23, 1998	Kitt Peak	Spacewatch	·	1.0 km	MPC · JPL
408738	2014 OG_{80}	—	September 13, 2007	Mount Lemmon	Mount Lemmon Survey	·	1.5 km	MPC · JPL
408739	2014 OO_{80}	—	January 31, 2006	Kitt Peak	Spacewatch	VER	3.0 km	MPC · JPL
408740	2014 OL_{109}	—	September 12, 1994	Kitt Peak	Spacewatch	·	470 m	MPC · JPL
408741	2014 OM_{111}	—	December 27, 2005	Kitt Peak	Spacewatch	·	720 m	MPC · JPL
408742	2014 OF_{112}	—	October 14, 1999	Socorro	LINEAR	·	2.8 km	MPC · JPL
408743	2014 OT_{115}	—	September 25, 2009	Catalina	CSS	TIR	3.4 km	MPC · JPL
408744	2014 OF_{127}	—	November 13, 2006	Catalina	CSS	EUN	1.5 km	MPC · JPL
408745	2014 OJ_{129}	—	January 27, 2006	Mount Lemmon	Mount Lemmon Survey	·	4.5 km	MPC · JPL
408746	2014 OG_{141}	—	March 28, 1995	Kitt Peak	Spacewatch	·	1.4 km	MPC · JPL
408747	2014 OP_{179}	—	October 30, 2000	Socorro	LINEAR	·	1.2 km	MPC · JPL
408748	2014 OZ_{241}	—	September 26, 2008	Kitt Peak	Spacewatch	·	500 m	MPC · JPL
408749	2014 OT_{276}	—	November 16, 2006	Kitt Peak	Spacewatch	·	1.7 km	MPC · JPL
408750	4308 P-L	—	September 24, 1960	Palomar	C. J. van Houten, I. van Houten-Groeneveld, T. Gehrels	(5)	1.2 km	MPC · JPL
408751	1987 SF_{3}	—	September 26, 1987	Palomar	C. S. Shoemaker, E. M. Shoemaker	AMO	400 m	MPC · JPL
408752	1991 TB_{2}	—	October 3, 1991	Palomar	J. E. Mueller	APO +1km	1.3 km	MPC · JPL
408753	1992 SU_{3}	—	September 24, 1992	Kitt Peak	Spacewatch	·	1.0 km	MPC · JPL
408754	1992 SX_{10}	—	September 27, 1992	Kitt Peak	Spacewatch	MAS	580 m	MPC · JPL
408755	1993 TG_{6}	—	October 9, 1993	Kitt Peak	Spacewatch	·	970 m	MPC · JPL
408756	1995 FU_{8}	—	March 26, 1995	Kitt Peak	Spacewatch	HYG	2.8 km	MPC · JPL
408757	1995 SS_{19}	—	September 18, 1995	Kitt Peak	Spacewatch	·	1.5 km	MPC · JPL
408758	1995 UK_{78}	—	October 23, 1995	Kitt Peak	Spacewatch	·	1.7 km	MPC · JPL
408759	1997 CL_{23}	—	February 6, 1997	Kitt Peak	Spacewatch	(6769)	1.1 km	MPC · JPL
408760	1997 SA_{6}	—	September 23, 1997	Kitt Peak	Spacewatch	·	2.8 km	MPC · JPL
408761	1997 TV_{2}	—	October 3, 1997	Caussols	ODAS	URS	4.1 km	MPC · JPL
408762	1997 TZ_{22}	—	October 6, 1997	Kitt Peak	Spacewatch	·	1.5 km	MPC · JPL
408763	1998 BU_{16}	—	January 7, 1998	Kitt Peak	Spacewatch	·	1.2 km	MPC · JPL
408764	1998 BC_{22}	—	January 23, 1998	Kitt Peak	Spacewatch	·	1.9 km	MPC · JPL
408765	1998 DY_{21}	—	February 22, 1998	Kitt Peak	Spacewatch	·	2.0 km	MPC · JPL
408766	1998 QO_{58}	—	August 30, 1998	Kitt Peak	Spacewatch	·	2.8 km	MPC · JPL
408767	1998 SK_{20}	—	September 20, 1998	Kitt Peak	Spacewatch	·	1.9 km	MPC · JPL
408768	1998 SQ_{49}	—	September 26, 1998	Socorro	LINEAR	·	730 m	MPC · JPL
408769	1998 TW_{22}	—	October 13, 1998	Kitt Peak	Spacewatch	EOS	2.0 km	MPC · JPL
408770	1998 TQ_{38}	—	October 15, 1998	Kitt Peak	Spacewatch	·	3.3 km	MPC · JPL
408771	1998 US_{50}	—	October 18, 1998	Kitt Peak	Spacewatch	EOS	1.7 km	MPC · JPL
408772	1998 WU_{2}	—	November 17, 1998	Caussols	ODAS	·	4.9 km	MPC · JPL
408773	1998 WX_{25}	—	November 16, 1998	Kitt Peak	Spacewatch	·	3.2 km	MPC · JPL
408774	1998 XT_{6}	—	December 8, 1998	Kitt Peak	Spacewatch	·	1.4 km	MPC · JPL
408775	1999 CT_{15}	—	February 11, 1999	Socorro	LINEAR	·	1.9 km	MPC · JPL
408776	1999 GM_{56}	—	April 9, 1999	Kitt Peak	Spacewatch	·	2.0 km	MPC · JPL
408777	1999 JD_{111}	—	May 8, 1999	Catalina	CSS	·	1.4 km	MPC · JPL
408778	1999 TE_{64}	—	September 6, 1999	Kitt Peak	Spacewatch	NYS	1.2 km	MPC · JPL
408779	1999 UV_{32}	—	October 31, 1999	Kitt Peak	Spacewatch	MAS	660 m	MPC · JPL
408780	1999 VQ_{17}	—	November 2, 1999	Kitt Peak	Spacewatch	TEL	1.2 km	MPC · JPL
408781	1999 VP_{57}	—	November 4, 1999	Socorro	LINEAR	NYS	1.2 km	MPC · JPL
408782	1999 VO_{65}	—	November 4, 1999	Socorro	LINEAR	·	1.3 km	MPC · JPL
408783	1999 VQ_{71}	—	November 4, 1999	Socorro	LINEAR	·	3.3 km	MPC · JPL
408784	1999 WS_{22}	—	November 17, 1999	Kitt Peak	Spacewatch	·	1.1 km	MPC · JPL
408785	1999 XY_{145}	—	December 7, 1999	Kitt Peak	Spacewatch	MAS	760 m	MPC · JPL
408786	1999 XA_{146}	—	December 7, 1999	Kitt Peak	Spacewatch	·	910 m	MPC · JPL
408787	2000 AK_{221}	—	January 8, 2000	Kitt Peak	Spacewatch	·	3.3 km	MPC · JPL
408788	2000 BN_{20}	—	January 26, 2000	Kitt Peak	Spacewatch	·	3.1 km	MPC · JPL
408789	2000 DL_{77}	—	February 29, 2000	Socorro	LINEAR	·	3.7 km	MPC · JPL
408790	2000 EK_{99}	—	March 12, 2000	Kitt Peak	Spacewatch	·	850 m	MPC · JPL
408791	2000 FQ_{72}	—	March 25, 2000	Kitt Peak	Spacewatch	VER	2.6 km	MPC · JPL
408792	2000 GF_{2}	—	April 3, 2000	Socorro	LINEAR	APO · PHA	270 m	MPC · JPL
408793	2000 GH_{58}	—	April 5, 2000	Socorro	LINEAR	·	1.7 km	MPC · JPL
408794	2000 GG_{186}	—	April 10, 2000	Kitt Peak	M. W. Buie	·	870 m	MPC · JPL
408795	2000 JH_{75}	—	May 4, 2000	Anderson Mesa	LONEOS	·	890 m	MPC · JPL
408796	2000 OE_{7}	—	July 3, 2000	Kitt Peak	Spacewatch	·	2.4 km	MPC · JPL
408797	2000 SM_{4}	—	September 22, 2000	Kitt Peak	Spacewatch	·	950 m	MPC · JPL
408798	2000 SG_{7}	—	September 20, 2000	Kitt Peak	Spacewatch	·	570 m	MPC · JPL
408799	2000 SL_{55}	—	September 24, 2000	Socorro	LINEAR	·	590 m	MPC · JPL
408800	2000 SZ_{79}	—	September 24, 2000	Socorro	LINEAR	·	580 m	MPC · JPL

== 408801–408900 ==
back to top

Designation			Discovery			Properties		Ref
Permanent	Provisional	Named after	Date	Site	Discoverer(s)	Category	Diam.	Ref
408801	2000 SQ_{134}	—	September 23, 2000	Socorro	LINEAR	·	2.0 km	MPC · JPL
408802	2000 ST_{138}	—	September 23, 2000	Socorro	LINEAR	(18466)	2.6 km	MPC · JPL
408803	2000 SZ_{143}	—	September 24, 2000	Socorro	LINEAR	·	930 m	MPC · JPL
408804	2000 SP_{204}	—	September 24, 2000	Socorro	LINEAR	BRA	1.8 km	MPC · JPL
408805	2000 SG_{239}	—	September 27, 2000	Socorro	LINEAR	·	2.0 km	MPC · JPL
408806	2000 SN_{248}	—	September 24, 2000	Socorro	LINEAR	·	670 m	MPC · JPL
408807	2000 SU_{248}	—	September 24, 2000	Socorro	LINEAR	·	880 m	MPC · JPL
408808	2000 SQ_{253}	—	September 24, 2000	Socorro	LINEAR	·	2.2 km	MPC · JPL
408809	2000 TX_{5}	—	October 1, 2000	Socorro	LINEAR	·	2.5 km	MPC · JPL
408810	2000 TO_{17}	—	October 1, 2000	Socorro	LINEAR	DOR	2.5 km	MPC · JPL
408811	2000 UR_{25}	—	October 24, 2000	Socorro	LINEAR	·	3.4 km	MPC · JPL
408812	2000 UK_{38}	—	October 24, 2000	Socorro	LINEAR	·	2.5 km	MPC · JPL
408813	2000 UF_{61}	—	October 25, 2000	Socorro	LINEAR	·	2.1 km	MPC · JPL
408814	2000 US_{75}	—	October 31, 2000	Socorro	LINEAR	·	990 m	MPC · JPL
408815	2000 UA_{107}	—	October 30, 2000	Socorro	LINEAR	·	930 m	MPC · JPL
408816	2000 WU_{11}	—	November 20, 2000	Kitt Peak	Spacewatch	·	770 m	MPC · JPL
408817	2000 WU_{63}	—	November 24, 2000	Kitt Peak	Spacewatch	·	670 m	MPC · JPL
408818	2000 WY_{138}	—	November 21, 2000	Socorro	LINEAR	·	1.1 km	MPC · JPL
408819	2000 YM_{108}	—	December 30, 2000	Socorro	LINEAR	·	2.0 km	MPC · JPL
408820	2001 FR_{38}	—	March 18, 2001	Socorro	LINEAR	·	2.6 km	MPC · JPL
408821	2001 FH_{185}	—	March 19, 2001	Anderson Mesa	LONEOS	·	1.1 km	MPC · JPL
408822	2001 FO_{219}	—	March 21, 2001	Kitt Peak	SKADS	·	950 m	MPC · JPL
408823	2001 KC_{29}	—	May 21, 2001	Socorro	LINEAR	·	2.3 km	MPC · JPL
408824	2001 OG_{37}	—	July 20, 2001	Palomar	NEAT	H	620 m	MPC · JPL
408825	2001 OF_{84}	—	July 29, 2001	Anderson Mesa	LONEOS	·	2.7 km	MPC · JPL
408826	2001 PP_{31}	—	August 10, 2001	Palomar	NEAT	·	2.1 km	MPC · JPL
408827	2001 PF_{42}	—	August 12, 2001	Palomar	NEAT	CYB	4.5 km	MPC · JPL
408828	2001 QU_{89}	—	August 16, 2001	Palomar	NEAT	BAR	1.8 km	MPC · JPL
408829	2001 QO_{158}	—	August 23, 2001	Anderson Mesa	LONEOS	EUN	1.4 km	MPC · JPL
408830	2001 QN_{169}	—	August 19, 2001	Anderson Mesa	LONEOS	·	1.9 km	MPC · JPL
408831	2001 QK_{288}	—	August 17, 2001	Palomar	NEAT	·	2.1 km	MPC · JPL
408832	2001 QJ_{298}	—	August 21, 2001	Cerro Tololo	M. W. Buie	cubewano (cold)	204 km	MPC · JPL
408833	2001 RV_{7}	—	August 23, 2001	Anderson Mesa	LONEOS	·	1.3 km	MPC · JPL
408834	2001 RQ_{43}	—	August 16, 2001	Socorro	LINEAR	·	1.7 km	MPC · JPL
408835	2001 RA_{52}	—	September 12, 2001	Socorro	LINEAR	EUN	1.4 km	MPC · JPL
408836	2001 RM_{98}	—	September 12, 2001	Kitt Peak	Spacewatch	·	1.5 km	MPC · JPL
408837	2001 RS_{102}	—	August 23, 2001	Anderson Mesa	LONEOS	(2076)	830 m	MPC · JPL
408838	2001 RF_{113}	—	September 12, 2001	Socorro	LINEAR	EUN	1.0 km	MPC · JPL
408839	2001 RH_{118}	—	September 12, 2001	Socorro	LINEAR	·	620 m	MPC · JPL
408840	2001 RV_{131}	—	September 12, 2001	Socorro	LINEAR	·	1.8 km	MPC · JPL
408841	2001 RN_{140}	—	September 12, 2001	Socorro	LINEAR	·	1.3 km	MPC · JPL
408842	2001 RL_{154}	—	September 10, 2001	Anderson Mesa	LONEOS	ADE	2.5 km	MPC · JPL
408843	2001 RQ_{154}	—	September 11, 2001	Kitt Peak	Spacewatch	·	1.6 km	MPC · JPL
408844	2001 SR_{19}	—	September 16, 2001	Socorro	LINEAR	·	1.6 km	MPC · JPL
408845	2001 SV_{60}	—	September 17, 2001	Socorro	LINEAR	EUN	1.3 km	MPC · JPL
408846	2001 SN_{75}	—	September 19, 2001	Anderson Mesa	LONEOS	H	560 m	MPC · JPL
408847	2001 SX_{91}	—	August 27, 2001	Kitt Peak	Spacewatch	·	1.5 km	MPC · JPL
408848	2001 SB_{98}	—	September 20, 2001	Socorro	LINEAR	·	670 m	MPC · JPL
408849	2001 SY_{122}	—	September 16, 2001	Socorro	LINEAR	·	1.7 km	MPC · JPL
408850	2001 SU_{130}	—	September 16, 2001	Socorro	LINEAR	·	1.6 km	MPC · JPL
408851	2001 SL_{133}	—	September 16, 2001	Socorro	LINEAR	·	690 m	MPC · JPL
408852	2001 SV_{172}	—	September 16, 2001	Socorro	LINEAR	·	1.5 km	MPC · JPL
408853	2001 SN_{174}	—	September 16, 2001	Socorro	LINEAR	·	1.8 km	MPC · JPL
408854	2001 SB_{192}	—	September 19, 2001	Socorro	LINEAR	·	640 m	MPC · JPL
408855	2001 SL_{193}	—	September 19, 2001	Socorro	LINEAR	·	1.4 km	MPC · JPL
408856	2001 SL_{217}	—	September 19, 2001	Socorro	LINEAR	·	1.5 km	MPC · JPL
408857	2001 SB_{221}	—	September 19, 2001	Socorro	LINEAR	·	1.5 km	MPC · JPL
408858	2001 SD_{223}	—	September 19, 2001	Socorro	LINEAR	·	560 m	MPC · JPL
408859	2001 SR_{236}	—	September 19, 2001	Socorro	LINEAR	·	1.7 km	MPC · JPL
408860	2001 SL_{259}	—	September 20, 2001	Socorro	LINEAR	·	1.3 km	MPC · JPL
408861	2001 SH_{269}	—	September 19, 2001	Kitt Peak	Spacewatch	·	1.3 km	MPC · JPL
408862	2001 SE_{282}	—	September 24, 2001	Socorro	LINEAR	H	610 m	MPC · JPL
408863	2001 SJ_{283}	—	September 27, 2001	Socorro	LINEAR	JUN	1.4 km	MPC · JPL
408864	2001 SR_{288}	—	September 17, 2001	Socorro	LINEAR	·	650 m	MPC · JPL
408865	2001 SF_{302}	—	September 12, 2001	Kitt Peak	Spacewatch	MIS	2.0 km	MPC · JPL
408866	2001 SF_{321}	—	September 25, 2001	Socorro	LINEAR	·	1.7 km	MPC · JPL
408867	2001 SE_{324}	—	September 19, 2001	Kitt Peak	Spacewatch	·	810 m	MPC · JPL
408868	2001 SY_{324}	—	September 16, 2001	Socorro	LINEAR	·	650 m	MPC · JPL
408869	2001 SD_{348}	—	September 26, 2001	Socorro	LINEAR	AMO	550 m	MPC · JPL
408870	2001 TX_{9}	—	September 20, 2001	Socorro	LINEAR	EUN	1.2 km	MPC · JPL
408871	2001 TZ_{68}	—	September 25, 2001	Kitt Peak	Spacewatch	·	1.6 km	MPC · JPL
408872	2001 TF_{90}	—	September 25, 2001	Socorro	LINEAR	·	1.5 km	MPC · JPL
408873	2001 TU_{117}	—	October 15, 2001	Socorro	LINEAR	·	2.4 km	MPC · JPL
408874	2001 TK_{120}	—	October 15, 2001	Socorro	LINEAR	·	1.7 km	MPC · JPL
408875	2001 TQ_{123}	—	August 22, 2001	Socorro	LINEAR	·	630 m	MPC · JPL
408876	2001 TZ_{135}	—	September 19, 2001	Anderson Mesa	LONEOS	·	2.3 km	MPC · JPL
408877	2001 TO_{138}	—	August 25, 2001	Anderson Mesa	LONEOS	·	1.5 km	MPC · JPL
408878	2001 TL_{178}	—	October 14, 2001	Socorro	LINEAR	·	1.7 km	MPC · JPL
408879	2001 TY_{183}	—	October 14, 2001	Socorro	LINEAR	HNS	1.2 km	MPC · JPL
408880	2001 TF_{204}	—	October 11, 2001	Socorro	LINEAR	·	2.0 km	MPC · JPL
408881	2001 TV_{237}	—	October 10, 2001	Palomar	NEAT	·	2.0 km	MPC · JPL
408882	2001 TN_{238}	—	October 15, 2001	Palomar	NEAT	·	1.5 km	MPC · JPL
408883	2001 TO_{248}	—	October 14, 2001	Apache Point	SDSS	·	470 m	MPC · JPL
408884	2001 TG_{257}	—	October 8, 2001	Palomar	NEAT	·	1.6 km	MPC · JPL
408885	2001 TU_{258}	—	October 15, 2001	Palomar	NEAT	·	1.2 km	MPC · JPL
408886	2001 UB_{6}	—	October 17, 2001	Socorro	LINEAR	H	620 m	MPC · JPL
408887	2001 UE_{12}	—	October 24, 2001	Desert Eagle	W. K. Y. Yeung	·	1.6 km	MPC · JPL
408888	2001 UL_{12}	—	September 19, 2001	Socorro	LINEAR	·	2.2 km	MPC · JPL
408889	2001 UO_{14}	—	October 24, 2001	Desert Eagle	W. K. Y. Yeung	·	2.3 km	MPC · JPL
408890	2001 UU_{28}	—	October 16, 2001	Socorro	LINEAR	·	1.6 km	MPC · JPL
408891	2001 UY_{38}	—	October 17, 2001	Socorro	LINEAR	·	660 m	MPC · JPL
408892	2001 UR_{40}	—	September 20, 2001	Socorro	LINEAR	·	1.7 km	MPC · JPL
408893	2001 UJ_{42}	—	October 14, 2001	Kitt Peak	Spacewatch	EUN	1.5 km	MPC · JPL
408894	2001 UG_{86}	—	October 16, 2001	Kitt Peak	Spacewatch	·	1.4 km	MPC · JPL
408895	2001 UB_{106}	—	October 20, 2001	Socorro	LINEAR	JUN	960 m	MPC · JPL
408896	2001 UF_{108}	—	October 20, 2001	Socorro	LINEAR	·	610 m	MPC · JPL
408897	2001 UD_{165}	—	October 23, 2001	Palomar	NEAT	·	1.9 km	MPC · JPL
408898	2001 UU_{184}	—	October 16, 2001	Palomar	NEAT	(5)	1.6 km	MPC · JPL
408899	2001 UC_{216}	—	October 14, 2001	Socorro	LINEAR	·	1.9 km	MPC · JPL
408900	2001 UM_{229}	—	October 16, 2001	Palomar	NEAT	(5)	1.4 km	MPC · JPL

== 408901–409000 ==
back to top

Designation			Discovery			Properties		Ref
Permanent	Provisional	Named after	Date	Site	Discoverer(s)	Category	Diam.	Ref
408901	2001 VN_{28}	—	November 9, 2001	Socorro	LINEAR	ADE	2.7 km	MPC · JPL
408902	2001 VA_{29}	—	November 9, 2001	Socorro	LINEAR	·	1.9 km	MPC · JPL
408903	2001 VK_{54}	—	November 10, 2001	Socorro	LINEAR	·	2.7 km	MPC · JPL
408904	2001 VN_{56}	—	November 10, 2001	Socorro	LINEAR	·	980 m	MPC · JPL
408905	2001 VL_{61}	—	November 10, 2001	Socorro	LINEAR	·	1.7 km	MPC · JPL
408906	2001 VO_{82}	—	October 21, 2001	Socorro	LINEAR	·	1.7 km	MPC · JPL
408907	2001 VX_{85}	—	November 12, 2001	Socorro	LINEAR	·	970 m	MPC · JPL
408908	2001 VD_{109}	—	November 12, 2001	Socorro	LINEAR	·	2.3 km	MPC · JPL
408909	2001 VX_{110}	—	November 12, 2001	Socorro	LINEAR	CLO	2.9 km	MPC · JPL
408910	2001 WS_{36}	—	October 17, 2001	Socorro	LINEAR	·	1.4 km	MPC · JPL
408911	2001 WH_{45}	—	November 19, 2001	Socorro	LINEAR	·	1.7 km	MPC · JPL
408912	2001 WD_{53}	—	November 19, 2001	Socorro	LINEAR	·	1.2 km	MPC · JPL
408913	2001 WL_{55}	—	November 19, 2001	Socorro	LINEAR	·	1.7 km	MPC · JPL
408914	2001 WO_{75}	—	November 20, 2001	Socorro	LINEAR	·	2.6 km	MPC · JPL
408915	2001 WO_{95}	—	November 11, 2001	Kitt Peak	Spacewatch	NEM	2.5 km	MPC · JPL
408916	2001 WK_{102}	—	November 19, 2001	Anderson Mesa	LONEOS	·	1.7 km	MPC · JPL
408917	2001 XW_{32}	—	December 10, 2001	Kitt Peak	Spacewatch	EUN	1.4 km	MPC · JPL
408918	2001 XP_{48}	—	October 15, 2001	Socorro	LINEAR	·	1.7 km	MPC · JPL
408919	2001 XM_{49}	—	December 10, 2001	Socorro	LINEAR	·	720 m	MPC · JPL
408920	2001 XV_{72}	—	November 20, 2001	Socorro	LINEAR	·	1.8 km	MPC · JPL
408921	2001 XE_{80}	—	December 11, 2001	Socorro	LINEAR	·	1.9 km	MPC · JPL
408922	2001 XV_{94}	—	December 10, 2001	Socorro	LINEAR	H	730 m	MPC · JPL
408923	2001 XP_{149}	—	December 14, 2001	Socorro	LINEAR	JUN	1.2 km	MPC · JPL
408924	2001 XC_{192}	—	December 14, 2001	Socorro	LINEAR	·	930 m	MPC · JPL
408925	2001 XO_{199}	—	December 14, 2001	Socorro	LINEAR	·	1.8 km	MPC · JPL
408926	2001 XW_{218}	—	December 15, 2001	Socorro	LINEAR	·	1.5 km	MPC · JPL
408927	2001 XD_{264}	—	December 14, 2001	Palomar	NEAT	·	2.1 km	MPC · JPL
408928	2001 YY_{35}	—	December 11, 2001	Socorro	LINEAR	·	2.3 km	MPC · JPL
408929	2001 YJ_{40}	—	December 18, 2001	Socorro	LINEAR	·	2.3 km	MPC · JPL
408930	2001 YG_{49}	—	December 18, 2001	Socorro	LINEAR	·	3.4 km	MPC · JPL
408931	2001 YA_{157}	—	December 19, 2001	Palomar	NEAT	·	2.2 km	MPC · JPL
408932	2002 AA_{129}	—	January 9, 2002	Socorro	LINEAR	H	580 m	MPC · JPL
408933	2002 AO_{131}	—	January 8, 2002	Socorro	LINEAR	H	650 m	MPC · JPL
408934	2002 AN_{138}	—	January 9, 2002	Socorro	LINEAR	·	590 m	MPC · JPL
408935	2002 AY_{150}	—	January 14, 2002	Socorro	LINEAR	·	1.9 km	MPC · JPL
408936	2002 AJ_{178}	—	January 14, 2002	Socorro	LINEAR	·	2.5 km	MPC · JPL
408937	2002 CJ_{72}	—	February 7, 2002	Socorro	LINEAR	·	710 m	MPC · JPL
408938	2002 CX_{73}	—	February 7, 2002	Socorro	LINEAR	·	840 m	MPC · JPL
408939	2002 CY_{114}	—	February 8, 2002	Socorro	LINEAR	H	500 m	MPC · JPL
408940	2002 CM_{128}	—	January 12, 2002	Kitt Peak	Spacewatch	·	2.6 km	MPC · JPL
408941	2002 CN_{128}	—	February 7, 2002	Socorro	LINEAR	·	920 m	MPC · JPL
408942	2002 CK_{133}	—	January 6, 2002	Kitt Peak	Spacewatch	·	2.4 km	MPC · JPL
408943	2002 CT_{219}	—	February 10, 2002	Socorro	LINEAR	·	3.3 km	MPC · JPL
408944	2002 CX_{256}	—	January 9, 2002	Kitt Peak	Spacewatch	DOR	2.6 km	MPC · JPL
408945	2002 CQ_{300}	—	February 11, 2002	Socorro	LINEAR	V	590 m	MPC · JPL
408946	2002 CX_{313}	—	February 12, 2002	Palomar	NEAT	H	650 m	MPC · JPL
408947	2002 DY_{8}	—	February 19, 2002	Socorro	LINEAR	PHO	1.1 km	MPC · JPL
408948	2002 DH_{20}	—	February 22, 2002	Palomar	NEAT	·	810 m	MPC · JPL
408949	2002 ER_{90}	—	March 12, 2002	Socorro	LINEAR	NYS	1.0 km	MPC · JPL
408950	2002 EU_{98}	—	March 13, 2002	Socorro	LINEAR	·	1.1 km	MPC · JPL
408951	2002 EW_{133}	—	March 10, 2002	Anderson Mesa	LONEOS	·	780 m	MPC · JPL
408952	2002 ER_{145}	—	March 13, 2002	Palomar	NEAT	·	1.0 km	MPC · JPL
408953	2002 EM_{151}	—	March 15, 2002	Kitt Peak	Spacewatch	·	960 m	MPC · JPL
408954	2002 ER_{155}	—	March 5, 2002	Kitt Peak	Spacewatch	·	900 m	MPC · JPL
408955	2002 FK_{29}	—	March 20, 2002	Socorro	LINEAR	·	850 m	MPC · JPL
408956	2002 GH_{2}	—	April 5, 2002	Anderson Mesa	LONEOS	·	1.2 km	MPC · JPL
408957	2002 GJ_{76}	—	April 9, 2002	Kitt Peak	Spacewatch	·	3.2 km	MPC · JPL
408958	2002 GC_{126}	—	April 12, 2002	Palomar	NEAT	·	1.2 km	MPC · JPL
408959	2002 GP_{138}	—	April 12, 2002	Haleakala	NEAT	·	3.0 km	MPC · JPL
408960	2002 GZ_{140}	—	April 13, 2002	Kitt Peak	Spacewatch	·	990 m	MPC · JPL
408961	2002 GT_{181}	—	April 8, 2002	Palomar	NEAT	·	1.3 km	MPC · JPL
408962	2002 JD_{150}	—	May 1, 2002	Palomar	NEAT	LIX	3.6 km	MPC · JPL
408963	2002 KQ_{3}	—	May 17, 2002	Socorro	LINEAR	·	3.1 km	MPC · JPL
408964	2002 NR_{64}	—	July 2, 2002	Palomar	NEAT	PHO	2.4 km	MPC · JPL
408965	2002 NN_{71}	—	July 8, 2002	Palomar	NEAT	·	2.0 km	MPC · JPL
408966	2002 OR_{26}	—	July 19, 2002	Palomar	NEAT	·	3.2 km	MPC · JPL
408967	2002 OW_{27}	—	July 22, 2002	Palomar	NEAT	·	4.0 km	MPC · JPL
408968	2002 OJ_{31}	—	July 17, 2002	Palomar	NEAT	·	2.8 km	MPC · JPL
408969	2002 PS_{92}	—	August 14, 2002	Palomar	NEAT	THB	3.2 km	MPC · JPL
408970	2002 PV_{114}	—	August 15, 2002	Kitt Peak	Spacewatch	·	620 m	MPC · JPL
408971	2002 PD_{184}	—	February 4, 2000	Kitt Peak	Spacewatch	(43176)	3.3 km	MPC · JPL
408972	2002 PT_{187}	—	August 8, 2002	Palomar	NEAT	·	2.7 km	MPC · JPL
408973	2002 QB_{69}	—	August 27, 2002	Palomar	NEAT	·	1.0 km	MPC · JPL
408974	2002 QW_{77}	—	August 18, 2002	Palomar	NEAT	·	3.6 km	MPC · JPL
408975	2002 QL_{93}	—	August 29, 2002	Palomar	NEAT	·	2.2 km	MPC · JPL
408976	2002 QQ_{110}	—	August 17, 2002	Palomar	NEAT	·	2.7 km	MPC · JPL
408977	2002 QG_{113}	—	August 27, 2002	Palomar	NEAT	·	3.3 km	MPC · JPL
408978	2002 QV_{114}	—	August 28, 2002	Palomar	NEAT	·	2.9 km	MPC · JPL
408979	2002 QL_{130}	—	August 30, 2002	Palomar	NEAT	·	2.9 km	MPC · JPL
408980	2002 RB_{126}	—	September 11, 2002	El Centro	W. K. Y. Yeung	APO	640 m	MPC · JPL
408981	2002 RS_{274}	—	September 4, 2002	Palomar	NEAT	·	1.2 km	MPC · JPL
408982	2002 SP	—	September 20, 2002	Palomar	NEAT	ATE	250 m	MPC · JPL
408983	2002 SL_{9}	—	September 27, 2002	Palomar	NEAT	·	1.4 km	MPC · JPL
408984	2002 SA_{67}	—	September 17, 2002	Palomar	NEAT	·	3.1 km	MPC · JPL
408985	2002 SE_{73}	—	September 16, 2002	Palomar	NEAT	·	1.1 km	MPC · JPL
408986	2002 TF_{69}	—	October 9, 2002	Socorro	LINEAR	H	610 m	MPC · JPL
408987	2002 TD_{71}	—	October 3, 2002	Palomar	NEAT	·	2.8 km	MPC · JPL
408988	2002 TN_{85}	—	October 2, 2002	Haleakala	NEAT	·	1.6 km	MPC · JPL
408989	2002 TW_{141}	—	October 5, 2002	Palomar	NEAT	·	1.1 km	MPC · JPL
408990	2002 TY_{272}	—	October 9, 2002	Socorro	LINEAR	·	810 m	MPC · JPL
408991	2002 TL_{277}	—	October 10, 2002	Palomar	NEAT	·	1.2 km	MPC · JPL
408992	2002 TP_{279}	—	October 10, 2002	Socorro	LINEAR	·	1.7 km	MPC · JPL
408993	2002 TF_{324}	—	October 5, 2002	Apache Point	SDSS	·	970 m	MPC · JPL
408994	2002 TG_{334}	—	October 5, 2002	Apache Point	SDSS	·	1.1 km	MPC · JPL
408995	2002 UZ_{36}	—	October 31, 2002	Palomar	NEAT	·	1.4 km	MPC · JPL
408996	2002 UC_{60}	—	October 29, 2002	Apache Point	SDSS	·	1.7 km	MPC · JPL
408997	2002 UC_{78}	—	October 31, 2002	Palomar	NEAT	·	1.6 km	MPC · JPL
408998	2002 VB_{27}	—	November 5, 2002	Socorro	LINEAR	·	3.1 km	MPC · JPL
408999	2002 VO_{64}	—	November 6, 2002	Haleakala	NEAT	·	1.5 km	MPC · JPL
409000	2002 VF_{107}	—	November 12, 2002	Socorro	LINEAR	·	1.2 km	MPC · JPL

back to top
