= 1923 Osiris =

Dark main-belt asteroid

Discovery
- Discovered by: C. J. van Houten; I. van Houten G. T. Gehrels
- Discovery site: Palomar Obs.
- Discovery date: 24 September 1960

Designations
- Pronunciation: /əˈsaɪrɪs/
- Named after: Osiris (Egyptian mythology)
- Alternative designations: 4011 P-L · 1964 TO_{2} 1966 FR · 1974 KN; 1974 KP · 1974 LE
- Minor planet category: main-belt · (inner); Sulamitis

Orbital characteristics
- Epoch 4 September 2017 (JD 2458000.5)
- Uncertainty parameter 0
- Observation arc: 62.70 yr (22,900 days)
- Aphelion: 2.5900 AU
- Perihelion: 2.2813 AU
- Semi-major axis: 2.4356 AU
- Eccentricity: 0.0634
- Orbital period (sidereal): 3.80 yr (1,388 days)
- Mean anomaly: 269.38°
- Mean motion: 0° 15^{m} 33.48^{s} / day
- Inclination: 4.9580°
- Longitude of ascending node: 353.07°
- Argument of perihelion: 106.04°

Physical characteristics
- Dimensions: 13.1 km 13.461±0.206
- Geometric albedo: 0.031±0.006; 0.0591 ± 0.008
- Spectral type: SMASS = C
- Absolute magnitude (H): 13.6

1923 Osiris, provisional designation 4011 P-L, is a dark asteroid from the inner regions of the asteroid belt, approximately 13 kilometers in diameter. It was discovered on 24 September 1960, by Ingrid and Cornelis Johannes van Houten at Leiden, on photographic plates taken by Tom Gehrels at Palomar Observatory in the United States. It was named after the Egyptian god Osiris.

== Orbit and classification ==
Osiris orbits the Sun in the inner main-belt at a distance of 2.3–2.6 AU once every 3 years and 10 months (1,388 days). Its orbit has an eccentricity of 0.06 and an inclination of 5° with respect to the ecliptic. Due to a precovery taken at the discovering observatory in 1953, the body's observation arc is extended by 7 years prior to its official discovery observation.

=== Palomar–Leiden survey ===
The designation P–L stands for Palomar–Leiden, named after Palomar Observatory and Leiden Observatory, which collaborated on the fruitful Palomar–Leiden survey in the 1960s. Gehrels used Palomar's Samuel Oschin telescope (also known as the 48-inch Schmidt Telescope), and shipped the photographic plates to Ingrid and Cornelis Johannes van Houten at Leiden Observatory. The trio are credited with several thousand asteroid discoveries.

== Physical characteristics ==
In the SMASS classification, Osiris is a carbonaceous C-type asteroid.

According to the survey carried out by NASA's Wide-field Infrared Survey Explorer with its subsequent NEOWISE mission, Osiris measures 13.461 kilometers in diameter and its surface has a low albedo of 0.031. As of 2017, no rotational lightcurve has been obtained.

== Naming ==
This minor planet was named after Osiris, the Egyptian god of vegetation, of the waxing and waning Moon and of the annual flooding of the Nile. The official naming citation was published by the Minor Planet Center on 1 November 1979 (M.P.C. 5013).
