= Meanings of minor-planet names: 5001–6000 =

As minor planet discoveries are confirmed, they are given a permanent number by the IAU's Minor Planet Center (MPC), and the discoverers can then submit names for them, following the IAU's naming conventions. The list below concerns those minor planets in the specified number-range that have received names, and explains the meanings of those names.

Official naming citations of newly named small Solar System bodies are approved and published in a bulletin by IAU's Working Group for Small Bodies Nomenclature (WGSBN). Before May 2021, citations were published in MPC's Minor Planet Circulars for many decades. Recent citations can also be found on the JPL Small-Body Database (SBDB). Until his death in 2016, German astronomer Lutz D. Schmadel compiled these citations into the Dictionary of Minor Planet Names (DMP) and regularly updated the collection.

Based on Paul Herget's The Names of the Minor Planets, Schmadel also researched the unclear origin of numerous asteroids, most of which had been named prior to World War II. This article incorporates text from this source, which is in the public domain: SBDB New namings may only be added to this list below after official publication as the preannouncement of names is condemned. The WGSBN publishes a comprehensive guideline for the naming rules of non-cometary small Solar System bodies.

== 5001–5100 ==
Named minor planet	Provisional	This minor planet was named for...	Ref · Catalog
5001 EMP	1987 SB_{1}	The annual publication Ephemerides Of Minor Planets (Russian: Ehfemeridy Malykh Planet). It contains astrometric information about minor planets	MPC · 5001
5002 Marnix	1987 SS_{3}	Philips Marnix van Sint Aldegonde (1538–1598), mayor of Antwerp, believed to have been the composer of the 'Wilhelmus', which became the Dutch national anthem in 1932	MPC · 5002
5003 Silvanominuto	1988 ER_{2}	Silvano Minuto (born 1940), Italian amateur astronomer, founder of the Suno Observatory and promoter of several regional laws on light pollution	JPL · 5003
5004 Bruch	1988 RR_{3}	Max Bruch (1838–1920), German composer	MPC · 5004
5005 Kegler	1988 UB	Ignatius Kegler (1680–1746), a German Jesuit and Astronomer Royal in Beijing	MPC · 5005
5006 Teller	1989 GL_{5}	Edward Teller (1908–2003), Hungarian-born American physicist	MPC · 5006
5007 Keay	1990 UH_{2}	Colin Stewart Lindsay Keay (1930–2015), Australian physicist and astronomer past president of IAU Commission 22 and chairman of the IAU Working Group on the Prevention of Interplanetary Pollution	MPC · 5007
5008 Miyazawakenji	1991 DV	Kenji Miyazawa, Japanese poet and children's novelist	JPL · 5008
5009 Sethos	2562 P-L	Sethos I, an Egyptian pharaoh of the Nineteenth Dynasty	MPC · 5009
5010 Amenemhêt	4594 P-L	Amenemhět III (1844–1797 B.C.), an Egyptian pharaoh of the Twelfth Dynasty	MPC · 5010
5011 Ptah	6743 P-L	Ptah, Egyptian god	MPC · 5011
5012 Eurymedon	9507 P-L	Eurymedon, charioteer of Agamemnon and servant of Nestor in the Trojan War	MPC · 5012
5013 Suzhousanzhong	1964 VT_{1}	Suzhousanzhong ("Suzhou No. 3 Middle School"), Jiangsu province, China, on the occasion (2006) of its 100th anniversary	JPL · 5013
5014 Gorchakov	1974 ST	Prince Alexander Gorchakov (1798–1883), chancellor of the Russian Empire	JPL · 5014
5015 Litke	1975 VP	Count Fyodor Litke (1797–1882), Russian navigator and explorer	JPL · 5015
5016 Migirenko	1976 GX_{3}	Georgij Sergeeveich Migirenko (born 1916), Russian physicist	MPC · 5016
5017 Tenchi	1977 DS_{2}	Emperor Tenji (626–671), Japan	MPC · 5017
5018 Tenmu	1977 DY_{8}	Emperor Temmu (c. 631–686), Japan	MPC · 5018
5019 Erfjord	1979 MS_{6}	Erfjord, village in Norway	JPL · 5019
5020 Asimov	1981 EX_{19}	Isaac Asimov (1920–1992), Russian-American science fiction writer	MPC · 5020
5021 Krylania	1982 VK_{12}	Anna Kapitsa (1903–1996) née Krylova, daughter of mathematician Aleksey Krylov and wife of physicist Pyotr Kapitsa	MPC · 5021
5022 Roccapalumba	1984 HE_{1}	Roccapalumba, a village in Sicily, Italy	JPL · 5022
5023 Agapenor	1985 TG_{3}	Agapenor, mythical person related to Trojan War	MPC · 5023
5024 Bechmann	1985 VP	Poul Bechmann is the former head of the mechanical workshop at the Brorfelde Observatory, Denmark	JPL · 5024
5025 Mecisteus	1986 TS_{6}	Mecisteus from Greek mythology, who carried the wounded Teucer and Hypsenor off the battlefield. Mecisteus and his father Echius were killed by Polydamas while defending the Greek ships.	IAU · 5025
5026 Martes	1987 QL_{1}	Animal species pine marten (Martes martes) and beech marten (Martes foina) living on Klet Mountain, Czech Republic, where the Klet Observatory is located	MPC · 5026
5027 Androgeos	1988 BX_{1}	Androgeos, mythical person related to Trojan War	MPC · 5027
5028 Halaesus	1988 BY_{1}	Halaesus, mythological Greek warrior	MPC · 5028
5029 Ireland	1988 BL_{2}	Named for the country of Ireland	MPC · 5029
5030 Gyldenkerne	1988 VK_{4}	Kjeld Gyldenkerne (1919–1999), Danish astronomer	JPL · 5030
5031 Švejcar	1990 FW_{1}	Josef Švejcar (1897–1997), Czech medical doctor	MPC · 5031
5032 Conradhirsh	1990 OO	Conrad W. Hirsh (1941–1999), teacher and explorer	JPL · 5032
5033 Mistral	1990 PF	Frédéric Mistral (1830–1914), French writer and Nobel Prize laureate	MPC · 5033
5034 Joeharrington	1991 PW_{10}	Joseph Harrington (born 1967), American planetary scientist at Cornell University, New York	JPL · 5034
5035 Swift	1991 UX	Lewis A. Swift (1820–1913), American astronomer and comet hunter	MPC · 5035
5036 Tuttle	1991 US_{2}	Horace P. Tuttle (1837–1923), American astronomer and American Civil War veteran	MPC · 5036
5037 Habing	6552 P-L	Harm Jan Habing (born 1937), Dutch astronomer and professor at Leiden University	MPC · 5037
5038 Overbeek	1948 KF	Michiel Daniel Overbeek (1920–2001), South African amateur astronomer and past president of ASSA	JPL · 5038
5039 Rosenkavalier	1967 GM_{1}	Richard Strauss (1864–1949), German composer of opera, notably Der Rosenkavalier (The Knight of the Rose)	MPC · 5039
5040 Rabinowitz	1972 RF	David Rabinowitz, American astronomer at Spacewatch and a discoverer of minor planets himself	MPC · 5040
5041 Theotes	1973 SW_{1}	Theotes, mythical person related to Trojan War	MPC · 5041
5042 Colpa	1974 ME	"Colpa", the Huarpe word for stones that are composed of "pure minerals". These indigenous people lived in San Juan province of Argentina, where the discovering Félix Aguilar Observatory is located	JPL · 5042
5043 Zadornov	1974 SB_{5}	Mikhail Zadornov, Russian comedian †	JPL · 5043
5044 Shestaka	1977 QH_{4}	Ivan Sofronovich Shestaka (1937–1994), chief researcher of comets and meteors at the astronomical observatory of Odessa University, Russia	MPC · 5044
5045 Hoyin	1978 UL_{2}	Yin Ho (1908–1983), Chinese philanthropist from Macau	JPL · 5045
5046 Carletonmoore	1981 DQ	Carleton Bryant Moore (1932–2023) professor of chemistry and geology of the Center for Meteorite Studies at Arizona State University	JPL · 5046
5047 Zanda	1981 EO_{42}	Brigitte Zanda (born 1958), a meteorite curator at the Muséum National d´Histoire Naturelle de Paris and an adjunct faculty member at Rutgers University	JPL · 5047
5048 Moriarty	1981 GC	Professor Moriarty, character in the Sherlock Holmes stories	MPC · 5048
5049 Sherlock	1981 VC_{1}	Sherlock Holmes, fictional detective	MPC · 5049
5050 Doctorwatson	1983 RD_{2}	Dr. Watson, character in the Sherlock Holmes stories	MPC · 5050
5051 Ralph	1984 SM	Ralph Florentin Nielsen (1942–1995) was head of the electronics laboratory at the Brorfelde Observatory, Denmark	JPL · 5051
5052 Nancyruth	1984 UT_{3}	Nancy R. Lebofsky, American educator	MPC · 5052
5053 Chladni	1985 FB_{2}	Ernst Chladni (1756–1827), German physicist and musician	MPC · 5053
5054 Keil	1986 AO_{2}	Klaus Keil (born 1934), American meteoriticist at University of Hawaii Institute of Geophysics and Planetology	MPC · 5054
5055 Opekushin	1986 PB_{5}	Aleksandr Mikhailovich Opekushin (1838–1923), Russian sculptor	MPC · 5055
5056 Rahua	1986 RQ_{5}	Rahua, wife of one of the four sons of Pirua Wiracocha, creator god of civilization in Inca mythology	JPL · 5056
5057 Weeks	1987 DC_{6}	Eric R. Weeks (born 1970), a professor in the Physics Department at Emory University	JPL · 5057
5058 Tarrega	1987 OM	Francisco Tárrega, Spanish classical guitarist-composer	MPC · 5058
5059 Saroma	1988 AF	Lake Saroma, Hokkaido, Japan	MPC · 5059
5060 Yoneta	1988 BO_{5}	Katsuhiko Yoneta (1904–1957), Japanese engineer and a graduate of Hokkaido University	MPC · 5060
5061 McIntosh	1988 DJ	Bruce A. McIntosh, Canadian astronomer	JPL · 5061
5062 Glennmiller	1989 CZ	Glenn Miller, American jazz musician and bandleader of the swing era	JPL · 5062
5063 Monteverdi	1989 CJ_{5}	Claudio Monteverdi (1567–1643), Italian composer and Catholic priest	MPC · 5063
5064 Tanchozuru	1990 FS	Tancho, Japanese crane	MPC · 5064
5065 Johnstone	1990 FP_{1}	Paul Johnstone (died 1976), the first director and producer of The Sky at Night, a British documentary television programme on astronomy	MPC · 5065
5066 Garradd	1990 MA	Gordon J. Garradd (born 1959), Australian amateur astronomer and photographer	MPC · 5066
5067 Occidental	1990 OX	Occidental College, located in the Eagle Rock neighborhood of Los Angeles, California, United States	MPC · 5067
5068 Cragg	1990 TC	Thomas A. Cragg (1927–2011), American amateur astronomer	MPC · 5068
5069 Tokeidai	1991 QB	Sapporo Tokeidai, Japan	MPC · 5069
5070 Arai	1991 XT	Arai Ikunosuke, Japanese from Bakumatsu to Meiji	MPC · 5070
5071 Schoenmaker	3099 T-2	Anton A. Schoenmaker, Dutch technical officer at the Leiden Observatory	MPC · 5071
5072 Hioki	1931 TS_{1}	Tsutomu Hioki, Japanese astronomer	MPC · 5072
5073 Junttura	1943 EN	"Junttura" embodies the Finnish mentality to get things done, stubbornly and at all costs	JPL · 5073
5074 Goetzoertel	1949 QQ_{1}	Goetz Oertel, American physicist and chairman of AURA	JPL · 5074
5075 Goryachev	1969 TN_{4}	Nikolaj Nikanorovich Goryachev (1883–1940), Russian professor of astronomy at Tomsk University	JPL · 5075
5076 Lebedev-Kumach	1973 SG_{4}	Vasily Lebedev-Kumach (1898–1949), Soviet and Russian poet and songwriter	MPC · 5076
5077 Favaloro	1974 MG	René Favaloro, Argentine cardiologist (1923–2000), creator of the bypass coronary surgery	JPL · 5077
5078 Solovjev-Sedoj	1974 SW	Vasilij Pavlovich Solovjev-Sedoj (1907–1979), Russian composer	MPC · 5078
5079 Brubeck	1975 DB	Dave Brubeck (1920–2012), American jazz pianist and composer	JPL · 5079
5080 Oja	1976 EB	Tarmo Oja, Swedish astronomer	MPC · 5080
5081 Sanguin	1976 WC_{1}	Juan G. Sanguin (1933–2006) was an Argentinian astronomer who was in charge of the minor planet and comet programs at the El Leoncito Station for more than a quarter of a century	JPL · 5081
5082 Nihonsyoki	1977 DN_{4}	Nihon Shoki, the first written history of Japan, compiled in the 8th century	MPC · 5082
5083 Irinara	1977 EV	Irina Evgen'evna Raksha, Russian writer and friend of the discoverer Nikolai Chernykh	MPC · 5083
5084 Gnedin	1977 FN_{1}	Yurij Nikolaevich Gnedin (1935–2018), Russian astrophysicist	MPC · 5084
5085 Hippocrene	1977 NN	Hippocrene, mythological Greek fountain	MPC · 5085
5086 Demin	1978 RH_{1}	Vladimir Grigor'evich Demin (1929–1996), Russian professor at Moscow University and expert on celestial mechanics and dynamics of rigid bodies	MPC · 5086
5087 Emelʹyanov	1978 RM_{2}	Nikolai Vladimirovich Emelʹyanov (born 1946), Russian astronomer head of the Celestial Mechanics Department of the Sternberg Astronomical Institute in Moscow	MPC · 5087
5088 Tancredi	1979 QZ_{1}	Gonzalo Tancredi, Uruguayan astronomer	MPC · 5088
5089 Nádherná	1979 SN	Sidonie Nádherná (1885–1950), Czech-British writer	JPL · 5089
5090 Wyeth	1980 CG	Stuart Wyeth, American donor of the Wyeth 1.5-meter telescope at Harvard Observatory	MPC · 5090
5091 Isakovskij	1981 SD_{4}	Mikhail Vasil'evich Isakovskii (1900–1973), Russian poet	MPC · 5091
5092 Manara	1982 FJ	Alessandro Manara, astronomer at Brera Astronomical Observatory in Milan, Italy	MPC · 5092
5093 Svirelia	1982 TG_{1}	Elsa Gustavovna Sviridova, the wife of Russian composer Georgy Sviridov	MPC · 5093
5094 Seryozha	1982 UT_{6}	Sergey Kapitsa (1928–2012), Russian physicist	MPC · 5094
5095 Escalante	1983 NL	Jaime Escalante (1930–2010), Bolivian-born mathematics teacher	MPC · 5095
5096 Luzin	1983 RC_{5}	Nikolai Nikolaevich Luzin, Russian mathematician	MPC · 5096
5097 Axford	1983 TW_{1}	Ian Axford (1933–2010), New Zealand-born astrophysicist and longtime director of the Max Planck Institute for Solar System Research	MPC · 5097
5098 Tomsolomon	1985 CH_{2}	Tom Solomon (born 1962) holds a Presidential Professorship in the Department of Physics and Astronomy at Bucknell University	JPL · 5098
5099 Iainbanks	1985 DY_{1}	Iain M. Banks (1954–2013), a Scottish writer	JPL · 5099
5100 Pasachoff	1985 GW	Jay Myron Pasachoff (1943–2022), Field Memorial Professor of Astronomy, Williams College, United States	MPC · 5100

== 5101–5200 ==
back to top

Named minor planet	Provisional	This minor planet was named for...	Ref · Catalog
5101 Akhmerov	1985 UB_{5}	Vadim Zinov'evich Akhmerov (born 1929), doctor in the Crimean Peninsula	MPC · 5101
5102 Benfranklin	1986 RD_{1}	Benjamin Franklin (1706–1790), American scientist, philosopher and statesman	MPC · 5102
5103 Diviš	1986 RP_{1}	Prokop Diviš (1698–1765), Czech scientist and monk	MPC · 5103
5104 Skripnichenko	1986 RU_{5}	Vladimir Ilich Skripnichenko (born 1942), Russian astronomer, staff member and deputy director of the Institute of Theoretical Astronomy in Saint Petersburg	MPC · 5104
5105 Westerhout	1986 TM_{1}	Gart Westerhout (1927–2012), Dutch radio astronomer	MPC · 5105
5106 Mortensen	1987 DJ	Inger Mortensen (born 1910) is an aunt of Brorfelde observer Karl Augustesen.	JPL · 5106
5107 Laurenbacall	1987 DS_{6}	Lauren Bacall (1924–2014), an American actress	JPL · 5107
5108 Lübeck	1987 QG_{2}	Vincent Lübeck (1654–1740), German composer and organist	MPC · 5108
5109 Robertmiller	1987 RM_{1}	Robert J. Miller (1950–2015), an American astronomer at the U.S. Naval Observatory	JPL · 5109
5110 Belgirate	1987 SV	The Italian village of Belgirate located on the shore of Lake Maggiore in Piedmont	MPC · 5110
5111 Jacliff	1987 SE_{4}	Clifford (1929–1993) and Jackie (born 1935) Holmes, American amateur astronomers	MPC · 5111
5112 Kusaji	1987 SM_{13}	Shigeharu Kusaji (1879–1956), Japanese amateur astronomer	MPC · 5112
5113 Kohno	1988 BN	Masaru Kohno (1926–1998), Japanese classical guitar maker	MPC · 5113
5114 Yezo	1988 CO	Named for Japan's northern island of Hokkaido, which was known as Yezo until 1869.	JPL · 5114
5115 Frimout	1988 CD_{4}	Dirk D. Frimout (born 1941), Belgian astrophysicist and astronaut with the U.S. Space Shuttle	MPC · 5115
5116 Korsør	1988 EU	Korsør, a town on the southwestern coast of Sjælland almost exactly 100 km from Copenhagen, is the birthplace of Brorfelde observer Karl Augustesen.	JPL · 5116
5117 Mokotoyama	1988 GH	Mount Mokoto, in eastern Hokkaido, Japan	MPC · 5117
5118 Elnapoul	1988 RB	Elna (1917–1992) and Poul Hyttel (born 1909), the parents-in-law of Brorfelde observer Karl Augustesen.	JPL · 5118
5119 Imbrius	1988 RA_{1}	Imbrius, from Greek mythology. He was the son of Mentor and married to Medesicaste, an illegitimate daughter of King Priam of Troy. Imbrius was killed by Teucer during the Trojan War.	IAU · 5119
5120 Bitias	1988 TZ_{1}	Bitias, Trojan warrior and wandering companion of Aeneas, from Greek mythology	MPC · 5120
5121 Numazawa	1989 AX_{1}	Shigemi Numazawa (born 1958), Japanese amateur astronomer, astrophotographer and space artist	MPC · 5121
5122 Mucha	1989 AZ_{1}	Alphonse Mucha (1860–1939), Czech artist	MPC · 5122
5123 Cynus	1989 BL	Cynus, a location in the Iliad from where the Locrians filled forty ships as part of the Greek armada that set out against Troy.	IAU · 5123
5124 Muraoka	1989 CW	Kenji Muraoka (born 1955), Japanese amateur astronomer and orbit computer	MPC · 5124
5125 Okushiri	1989 CN_{1}	Okushiri Island, some 30 km to the southwest of Hokkaido, noted for its rich fishing grounds for squid and scallops.	JPL · 5125
5126 Achaemenides	1989 CH_{2}	Achaemenides, mythological Greek warrior	MPC · 5126
5127 Bruhns	1989 CO_{3}	Nicolaus Bruhns (1665–1697), Danish-German organist, violinist, and composer	MPC · 5127
5128 Wakabayashi	1989 FJ	Wakabayashi-ku, Sendai, Japan	MPC · 5128
5129 Groom	1989 GN	Steven L. Groom, a computer engineer at JPL and creator of NEAT's autonomous observing system	MPC · 5129
5130 Ilioneus	1989 SC_{7}	Ilioneus, mythical person related to Trojan War	MPC · 5130
5132 Maynard	1990 ME	Owen Eugene Maynard (1924 –2000), Canadian aeronautical engineer	MPC · 5132
5133 Phillipadams	1990 PA	Phillip Adams (born 1939), an Australian broadcaster, writer and social commentator	MPC · 5133
5134 Ebilson	1990 SM_{2}	Elisabeth Bilson (born 1937), chemist and administrator in the Department of Astronomy at Cornell University Src	MPC · 5134
5135 Nibutani	1990 UE	Nibutani, sacred land for the indigenous Ainu of Hokkaidō, Japan.	JPL · 5135
5136 Baggaley	1990 UG_{2}	W. Jack Baggaley (born 1938), English radar meteor researcher at the University of Canterbury in New Zealand	MPC · 5136
5137 Frevert	1990 VC	Friedrich Frevert (1914–2001), German astronomer Src	MPC · 5137
5138 Gyoda	1990 VD_{2}	Gyōda, Saitama, Japan	MPC · 5138
5139 Rumoi	1990 VH_{4}	Rumoi, Hokkaidō, Japan	MPC · 5139
5140 Kida	1990 XH	Kinjirō Kida (1893–1962), Hokkaido-born painter, known for his landscapes, and whose work has been compared to that of Cézanne and other impressionists.	JPL · 5140
5141 Tachibana	1990 YB	Tachibana, a kendo club	MPC · 5141
5142 Okutama	1990 YD	Okutama Observatory, Japan	MPC · 5142
5143 Heracles	1991 VL	Heracles, Greek hero	MPC · 5143
5144 Achates	1991 XX	Achates, mythical Trojan warrior	MPC · 5144
5145 Pholus	1992 AD	Pholus, mythological centaur	MPC · 5145
5146 Moiwa	1992 BP	Mount Moiwa, the mountain that offers an outstanding panorama of the city of Sapporo and is popular both to skiers and to hikers in its virgin forest.	JPL · 5146
5147 Maruyama	1992 BQ	Maruyama hill, a small hill, situated near Mt. Moiwa in the southwestern part of Sapporo and known for a beautiful park and zoo, as well as the Hokkaido Shrine.	JPL · 5147
5148 Giordano	5557 P-L	Giordano Bruno (1548–1600), Italian Dominican priest	MPC · 5148
5149 Leibniz	6582 P-L	Gottfried Leibniz (1646–1716), German philosopher, mathematician, and co-inventor of calculus	MPC · 5149
5150 Fellini	7571 P-L	Federico Fellini (1920–1993), Italian film director	MPC · 5150
5151 Weerstra	2160 T-2	Claas Weerstra, Dutch comet chaser and administrative officer and longtime programmer at the Leiden Observatory	MPC · 5151
5152 Labs	1931 UD	Dietrich Labs (born 1921), German astrophysicist and professor at Heidelberg University and Königstuhl Observatory	JPL · 5152
5153 Gierasch	1940 GO	Peter J. Gierasch (1940–2023), planetary scientist, co-founder of Cornell University's Center for Radiophysics and Space Research, and winner of the 2014 Gerard P. Kuiper Prize	MPC · 5153
5154 Leonov	1969 TL_{1}	Yevgeny Leonov (1926–1994), Soviet artist and actor	MPC · 5154
5155 Denisyuk	1972 HR	Yurij Nikolaevich Denisyuk (1927–2006), head of a laboratory at the Ioffe Physical and Technical Institute in St. Petersburg and a member of the Royal Photographic Society.	JPL · 5155
5156 Golant	1972 KL	Victor Evgen'evich Golant (1928-2008), director of the department of plasma physics, atomic physics and astrophysics at the Ioffe Physical and Technical Institute in Saint Petersburg	JPL · 5156
5157 Hindemith	1973 UB_{5}	Paul Hindemith (1895–1963), German composer, violist and conductor	MPC · 5157
5158 Ogarev	1976 YY	Nikolay Ogarev (1813–1877), a Russian poet, historian and political activist	MPC · 5158
5159 Burbine	1977 RG	Thomas Burbine, American planetary scientist at Mount Holyoke College	MPC · 5159
5160 Camoes	1979 YO	Luís de Camões (1524–1580) Portuguese poet	MPC · 5160
5161 Wightman	1980 TX_{3}	Kingsley W. Wightman, teacher of astronomy at Chabot Space and Science Center in Oakland, California	MPC · 5161
5162 Piemonte	1982 BW	Piedmont, the northwestern region of Italy, with its capital Turin	MPC · 5162
5163 Vollmayr-Lee	1983 TD_{2}	Katharina Vollmayr-Lee (born 1967), a professor in the Department of Physics and Astronomy at Bucknell University.	JPL · 5163
5164 Mullo	1984 WE_{1}	Mullo, a Celtic god, associated by the Romans with Mars	MPC · 5164
5165 Videnom	1985 CG	Videnom, popular weekly Danish television program on natural science.	JPL · 5165
5166 Olson	1985 FU_{1}	Irvin Edward "Ole" Olson (1910–1993), an American telescope-dome manufacturer	MPC · 5166
5167 Joeharms	1985 GU_{1}	John (Joe) Eric Harms, an Australian geologist	MPC · 5167
5168 Jenner	1986 EJ	Edward Jenner (1749–1823), English medical doctor, who introduced the smallpox vaccine	MPC · 5168
5169 Duffell	1986 RU_{2}	Stephen Duffell (born 1943), friend of Edward Bowell who discovered this minor planet	MPC · 5169
5170 Sissons	1987 EH	Anthony Sissons (born 1943), friend of Edward Bowell who discovered this minor planet	MPC · 5170
5171 Augustesen	1987 SQ_{3}	Karl A. Augustesen (born 1945) has for several decades been the observer at the Schmidt telescope erected at Brorfelde in 1965.	JPL · 5171
5172 Yoshiyuki	1987 UX_{1}	Yoshiyuki Endo (born 1953), the landowner of the Kushiro Observatory	JPL · 5172
5173 Stjerneborg	1988 EM_{1}	Stjärneborg, pioneering astronomical observatory built by Tycho Brahe	MPC · 5173
5174 Okugi	1988 HF	Shin Okugi (born 1952), Japanese optical engineer and director of the software division of Goto Optical Laboratory	MPC · 5174
5175 Ables	1988 VS_{4}	Harold D. Ables (born 1938), American astronomer and former director at the United States Naval Observatory Flagstaff Station	MPC · 5175
5176 Yoichi	1989 AU	The Japanese city of Yoichi located in southwestern Hokkaido and noted for its fruit and marine products.	JPL · 5176
5177 Hugowolf	1989 AY_{6}	Hugo Wolf (1860–1903), Austrian composer	MPC · 5177
5178 Pattazhy	1989 CD_{4}	Sainudeen Pattazhy (born 1962), an Indian environmentalist and zoologist	JPL · 5178
5179 Takeshima	1989 EO_{1}	Toshio Takeshima (born 1930), a Japanese Iai master and friend of Tsutomu Seki who discovered this minor planet	MPC · 5179
5180 Ohno	1989 GF	Keiko Ohno (born 1959), Japanese activities in promoting the public awareness of the study of astronomy and space science. She is a software developer at Goto Optical Laboratory	MPC · 5180
5181 SURF	1989 GO	Summer Undergraduate Research Fellowship (SURF) program of Caltech	MPC · 5181
5182 Bray	1989 NE	Olin D. Bray (born 1907), an American medical doctor and friend of Eleanor Helin who discovered this minor planet. The naming took place on the occasion of Bray's 85th birthday in 1992.	MPC · 5182
5183 Robyn	1990 OA_{1}	Laurie Robyn Ernst Yeomans, wife of Donald Yeomans, see (2956), president of IAU Commission 20	MPC · 5183
5184 Cavaillé-Coll	1990 QY_{7}	Aristide Cavaillé-Coll (1811–1899), member of a famous French dynasty of organ builders	MPC · 5184
5185 Alerossi	1990 RV_{2}	Alessandro Rossi (born 1964), a member of the Group of Satellite Flight Dynamics at the Istituto CNECE in Pisa	JPL · 5185
5186 Donalu	1990 SB_{4}	Dona(lu) Wheeler Roman, wife of American discoverer Brian P. Roman	MPC · 5186
5187 Domon	1990 TK_{1}	Ken Domon (1909–1990), Japanese photographer	MPC · 5187
5188 Paine	1990 TZ_{2}	Thomas O. Paine (1921–1992), American metallurgist, third Administrator of NASA, and advisor to the Planetary Society	MPC · 5188
5190 Fry	1990 UR_{2}	Stephen Fry (born 1957), an English writer, actor, comedian, TV presenter and activist	JPL · 5190
5191 Paddack	1990 VO_{3}	Stephen J. Paddack (born 1934), an aeronautical engineer and contributor to the understanding of the Yorp effect	JPL · 5191
5192 Yabuki	1991 CC	Hiroshi Yabuki (born 1960), a leading Japanese developer of automated planetarium programs at Goto Optical Laboratory	MPC · 5192
5193 Tanakawataru	1992 ET	Wataru Tanaka (born 1939), Japanese astronomer and professor at the National Astronomical Observatory of Japan	JPL · 5193
5194 Böttger	4641 P-L	Johann Friedrich Böttger (1682–1719), a German alchemist and one of the early inventors of hard-paste porcelain in Meissen, Germany	MPC · 5194
5195 Kaendler	3289 T-1	Johann Joachim Kaendler (1706–1775), German sculptor, later founder of the European style of porcelain in Meissen, Germany	MPC · 5195
5196 Bustelli	3102 T-2	Franz Anton Bustelli (1723–1763), Swiss artist, involved with the Nymphenburg Porcelain Manufactory	MPC · 5196
5197 Rottmann	4265 T-2	Friedrich Rottmann (1797–1850), German Romantic landscape painter and father of Carl Rottmann	MPC · 5197
5198 Fongyunwah	1975 BP_{1}	Yun-Wah Fong (1924–2022), Chinese educator and mentor of Chinese astronomer Yang Jiexing, who is an uncredited co-discoverer of this minor planet at the Purple Mountain Observatory	MPC · 5198
5199 Dortmund	1981 RP_{2}	The city of Dortmund, capital of North Rhein-Westphalia, Germany	MPC · 5199
5200 Pamal	1983 CM	Patrick Michael Malotki (born 1974), friend of Edward Bowell who discovered this minor planet. The naming took place on the occasion of his 21st birthday (the nickname stands for "pas mal", French for "not bad", a compliment).	MPC · 5200

== 5201–5300 ==
back to top

Named minor planet	Provisional	This minor planet was named for...	Ref · Catalog
5201 Ferraz-Mello	1983 XF	Sylvio Ferraz-Mello (born 1936), Brazilian astronomer	MPC · 5201
5202 Charleseliot	1983 XX	Charles William Eliot (1834–1926), an American chemist and the 21st President of Harvard College	JPL · 5202
5203 Pavarotti	1984 SF_{1}	Luciano Pavarotti (1935–2007), Italian opera singer	MPC · 5203
5204 Herakleitos	1988 CN_{2}	Herakleitos, Ancient Greek philosopher	MPC · 5204
5205 Servián	1988 CU_{7}	Berta E. Servián de Flores (1914–1996), the first Paraguayan woman aviator.	JPL · 5205
5206 Kodomonomori	1988 ED	Kodomo no Mori (Children's Forest), Treeplanting program in Japan	MPC · 5206
5207 Hearnshaw	1988 HE	John Bernard Hearnshaw (born 1946), New Zealand spectroscopist, who has guided the Mount John University Observatory through major developments over 30 years	JPL · 5207
5208 Royer	1989 CH_{1}	Msgr. Ronald E. Royer, American priest, amateur astronomer and astrophotographer	MPC · 5208
5209 Oloosson	1989 CW_{1}	Oloosson, a town mentioned in the Catalogue of Ships in the Iliad by Homer.	IAU · 5209
5210 Saint-Saëns	1989 EL_{6}	Camille Saint-Saëns (1835–1921), French composer	MPC · 5210
5211 Stevenson	1989 NX	David J. Stevenson (born 1948), New Zealand planetary scientist	MPC · 5211
5212 Celiacruz	1989 SS	Celia Cruz (1925–2003), a Cuban-American salsa singer and performer	JPL · 5212
5213 Takahashi	1990 FU	Kiichiro Takahashi, president of Takahashi Seisakusho	MPC · 5213
5214 Oozora	1990 VN_{3}	Super Ōzora, Limited express train at Hokkaidō, Japan	MPC · 5214
5215 Tsurui	1991 AE	Tsurui, Hokkaidō, Japan	MPC · 5215
5216 Cannizzo	1941 HA	John Kendall Cannizzo (1957–2018) was an American astrophysicist who worked at the NASA's Goddard Space Flight Center. He also spent time at the Harvard College Observatory, where he met his wife Catherine Asaro, and did research as a Humboldt Fellow at the Max Planck Institute for Astrophysics.	JPL · 5216
5217 Chaozhou	1966 CL	Chaozhou, a Chinese city in Guangdong Province, cradle of the Chaoshan Culture.	JPL · 5217
5218 Kutsak	1969 TB_{3}	Mariya Romanovna Kutsak (1928–1997) was a schoolteacher of physics and astronomy in the city of Omsk for about 40 years	JPL · 5218
5219 Zemka	1976 GU_{3}	Aleksandr Grigorjevich Zemka (born 1947), friend of the discoverer, electrotechnics engineer in Zaporozhje, both a prominent specialist and a good organizer who wins the respect of his colleagues and acquaintances. He provided valuable help to the discoverer in improving the 0.64-m telescope used for the Crimean NEA Survey	JPL · 5219
5220 Vika	1979 SA_{8}	Viktoriya Semenovna Vinogradova (born 1928), doctor at the Crimean Astrophysical Observatory on the Crimean peninsula	MPC · 5220
5221 Fabribudweis	1980 FB	Wenceslaus Fabri de Budweis (c. 1460–1518), Czech scientist and author of almanacs	MPC · 5221
5222 Ioffe	1980 TL_{13}	Abram Ioffe (1880–1960), Russian physicist and pioneer in semi-conductor research	MPC · 5222
5223 McSween	1981 EX_{6}	Harry McSween, planetary geologist and geochemist, meteorite researcher Src	MPC · 5223
5224 Abbe	1982 DX_{3}	Ernst Abbe (1840–1905), German astronomer, optician, educator and director of the Jena Observatory	MPC · 5224
5225 Loral	1983 TS_{1}	Loral Inc, an American manufacturer of CCDs	MPC · 5225
5226 Pollack	1983 WL	James B. Pollack (1938–1994), an American planetary scientist at the NASA Ames Research Center.	MPC · 5226
5227 Bocacara	1986 PE	Bocacara, a Spanish village south of the historic university city of Salamanca. It was first settled in the Middle Ages and remained a farming and herding village until the end of the 20th century. Crops included wheat, beans and garbanzos, but Bocacara was renowned in the region for its potatoes.	JPL · 5227
5228 Máca	1986 VT	Jan Máca, schoolmate and friend of the discoverer, for his contribution to the protection of nature	MPC · 5228
5229 Irurita	1987 DE_{6}	Irurita is one of 15 villages nestled in the Baztan Valley, within the autonomous community of Navarre in the Basque Country in northern Spain.	JPL · 5229
5230 Asahina	1988 EF	Takashi Asahina, Japanese conductor	MPC · 5230
5231 Verne	1988 JV	Jules Verne, French novelist and playwright	MPC · 5231
5232 Jordaens	1988 PR_{1}	Jacob Jordaens, Flemish painter	MPC · 5232
5233 Nastes	1988 RL_{10}	Nastes, from Greek mythology. With his brother Amphimacus, he was a leader of the Carian contingent on the side of the Trojans in the Trojan War. Nastes was killed in the river Maeander by Achilles, who stripped off his armour and golden ornaments.	IAU · 5233
5234 Sechenov	1989 VP	Ivan Sechenov (1829–1905), Russian naturalist and physiologist	MPC · 5234
5235 Jean-Loup	1990 SA_{1}	Jean-Loup Bertaux (born 1942), a French planetary scientist who headed the Department of Solar System Studies at CNRS	MPC · 5235
5236 Yoko	1990 TG_{3}	Yoko Huruta, wife of discoverer	MPC · 5236
5237 Yoshikawa	1990 UF_{3}	Katsunori Yoshikawa (born 1942), owner of the land on which the Nihondaira Observatory was built on. The observatory is located in one of the green-tea producing areas in Japan.	MPC · 5237
5238 Naozane	1990 VE_{2}	Kumagai Naozane, early samurai	MPC · 5238
5239 Reiki	1990 VC_{4}	Reiki Kushida, a Japanese amateur astronomer and discoverer of minor planets. She was the first woman to discover a supernova (1991bg) visually.	MPC · 5239
5240 Kwasan	1990 XE	Kwasan Observatory (377) of Kyoto University is located near Kyoto, Japan	MPC · 5240
5241 Beeson	1990 YL	Charlotte "Charlie" Beeson (born 1990) is a British astronomer, computer programmer, gymnast, dancer and musician, who undertook research at the Harvard- Smithsonian Center for Astrophysics for her Masters Thesis: Methods to Improve Near-Earth Asteroid Discovery and Spectroscopic Characterisation Rates.	JPL · 5241
5242 Kenreimonin	1991 BO	Empress Dowager Kenrei, Japan	MPC · 5242
5243 Clasien	1246 T-2	Clasien Shane, wife of American astronomer William Whitney Shane (born 1923) at the Leiden and Nijmegen (C39) observatories	MPC · 5243
5244 Amphilochos	1973 SQ_{1}	Amphilochos (son of Amphiaraos), mythical person related to Trojan War	MPC · 5244
5245 Maslyakov	1976 GR_{2}	Aleksandr Vasil'evich Maslyakov, Russian TV journalist, known for the program "Club of Merry and Resourceful Persons" (KVN)	MPC · 5245
5246 Migliorini	1979 OB	Fabio Migliorini (1971–1997), a young researcher who died in a mountain accident	JPL · 5246
5247 Krylov	1982 UP_{6}	Aleksey Krylov (1863–1945), a Russian mathematician and naval architect	MPC · 5247
5248 Scardia	1983 GQ	Marco Scardia (born 1948), Italian astrometrist at the Merate and Brera observatories in northern Italy	MPC · 5248
5249 Giza	1983 HJ	Giza, Egyptian city on the west bank of the Nile, known for some of Egypt's greatest antiquities	MPC · 5249
5250 Jas	1984 QF	Czech for 'brightness' and the initials of the South Bohemian Astronomical Society (Jihočeská Astronomická Společnost)	MPC · 5250
5251 Bradwood	1985 KA	Frank Bradshaw Wood, American astronomer	JPL · 5251
5252 Vikrymov	1985 PZ_{1}	Viktor Aleksandrovich Krymov (born 1929), deputy director of the Institute of Theoretical Astronomy (ITA) in St Peterburg, Russia	MPC · 5252
5253 Fredclifford	1985 XB	Fred Clifford (1924–1980) was a mariner, joining the U.S. Merchant Marine in 1943 to fulfill a life-long dream of going to sea. He was a forward thinker and inspired early technological development of foam-core surfboards and was co-owner of Clifford/George Surfboards in Santa Barbara, California, USA in the 1960s.	JPL · 5253
5254 Ulysses	1986 VG_{1}	Odysseus (Roman name: "Ulysses"), mythological Greek king	MPC · 5254
5255 Johnsophie	1988 KF	John and Sophie Karayusuf, parents of Alford S. Karayusuf, a friend of the discoverer. Under the starry skies of the Syrian Desert, they inspired their children to study the stars and planets and to wonder in amazement at the ability of mankind to explore the heavens	JPL · 5255
5256 Farquhar	1988 NN	Robert W. Farquhar (1932–2015), an American mission design specialist at NASA	MPC · 5256
5257 Laogonus	1988 RS_{10}	Laogonus, from Greek mythology. He was the son of Bias and grandson of King Priam of Troy. Laogonus and his brother Dardanus were killed by Achilles, who knocked the brothers from their chariots, smiting one with a cast of his spear and the other with his sword in close fight.	IAU · 5257
5258 Rhoeo	1989 AU_{1}	Rhoeo was thrown in the ocean locked in a chest after her father learned she was pregnant. She was guided by Apollo, her lover, to the island of Delos where she gave birth to Anius, who later prophesied that the siege of Troy would go on for ten years.	IAU · 5258
5259 Epeigeus	1989 BB_{1}	Epeigeus, mythical person related to Trojan War	MPC · 5259
5260 Philvéron	1989 RH	Philippe Véron, French astronomer	MPC · 5260
5261 Eureka	1990 MB	Eureka!, Greek exclamation of discovery	MPC · 5261
5262 Brucegoldberg	1990 XB_{1}	Bruce A. Goldberg, an American scientist at JPL and USAF Phillips Laboratory, was a friend of Eleanor F. Helin, who discovered this minor planet.	MPC · 5262
5263 Arrius	1991 GY_{9}	Harrison Callum Bertram Steel (born 1992), son of British discoverer Duncan Steel	MPC · 5263
5264 Telephus	1991 KC	Telephus, mythical person related to Trojan War	MPC · 5264
5265 Schadow	2570 P-L	Johann Gottfried Schadow (1764–1850), German sculptor whose work includes the chariot on top of the Brandenburg Gate in Berlin	MPC · 5265
5266 Rauch	4047 T-2	Christian Daniel Rauch, German sculptor	JPL · 5266
5267 Zegmott	1966 CF	Tarik Zegmott (born 1992) is a British Astronomy PhD student whose research for his Masters thesis, "Optimising Observing Strategies for Near-Earth Asteroid Characterisation", was undertaken at the Harvard-Smithsonian Center for Astrophysics.	JPL · 5267
5268 Černohorský	1971 US_{1}	Martin Černohorský, Czech physicist.	JPL · 5268
5269 Paustovskij	1978 SL_{6}	Konstantin Paustovsky (1892–1968), Russian writer	MPC · 5269
5270 Kakabadze	1979 KR	David Kakabadze (1889–1952), a Georgian painter and avantgardist	MPC · 5270
5271 Kaylamaya	1979 MH_{7}	Kayla Maya Soderblom was the daughter of planetary scientist Jason Soderblom and granddaughter of planetary scientist Larry Soderblom. Born with a congenital heart problem, Kayla lived only 15 months, but was a source of happiness and inspiration for all who knew her.	JPL · 5271
5272 Dickinson	1981 QH_{2}	Terence Dickinson (1943–2023), Canadian astronomy populariser	MPC · 5272
5273 Peilisheng	1982 DQ_{6}	Pei Lisheng, 20th-century Chinese satellite scientist and oceanographer	JPL · 5273
5274 Degewij	1985 RS	Johan Degewij (born 1944), Dutch astronomer	MPC · 5274
5275 Zdislava	1986 UU	Saint Zdislava (sv. Zdislava), Moravian noblewoman, wife of Markvartic Havel, Duke of Lemberk, known for her generosity to the poor, and an early lay member of the Dominican Order	MPC · 5275
5276 Gulkis	1987 GK	Samuel Gulkis, an American astronomer and expert in radio and submillimeter astronomy at JPL, was a supporter of the NEAT program	MPC · 5276
5277 Brisbane	1988 DO	Brisbane, the name of the capital city of Queensland, itself honors Sir Thomas Makdougall Brisbane, an astronomer and the colonial governor who established Australia's first permanent observatory in 1822. The minor planet's discoverer was born 20 km from Brisbane's birthplace in Ayrshire, Scotland	JPL · 5277
5278 Polly	1988 EJ_{1}	Polly Brooks, member of the Planetary Society's New Millennium Committee	MPC · 5278
5279 Arthuradel	1988 LA	Arthur Adel, American astrophysicist	MPC · 5279
5280 Andrewbecker	1988 PT	Andrew C. Becker (born 1973), an American astronomer and data scientist at the University of Washington.	JPL · 5280
5281 Lindstrom	1988 SO_{1}	Marilyn Lindstrom (born 1946) (born Marilyn R. Martin), American planetary geologist and curator of the U.S. Antarctic meteorite collection at NASA's Johnson Space Center	MPC · 5281
5282 Yamatotakeru	1988 VT	Yamato Takeru, Japanese legendary prince	MPC · 5282
5283 Pyrrhus	1989 BW	Neoptolemus, son of Achilles	MPC · 5283
5284 Orsilocus	1989 CK_{2}	Greek warrior Orsilochus, son of Diocles and twin brother of Crethon, killed by Aeneas during the Trojan War	MPC · 5284
5285 Krethon	1989 EO_{11}	Greek warrior Crethon (Krethon), son of Diocles and twin brother of Orsilochus, killed by Aeneas during the Trojan War	MPC · 5285
5286 Haruomukai	1989 VT_{1}	Haruo Mukai (1949–1986) was the younger brother of Japanese astronomer Masaru Mukai, who co-discovered this minor planet	MPC · 5286
5287 Heishu	1989 WE	Heishu Hosoi, Japanese confucianist	MPC · 5287
5288 Nankichi	1989 XD	Nankichi Niimi, Japanese author	MPC · 5288
5289 Niemelä	1990 KG_{2}	Born in Helsinki, Virpi Niemelä (1936–2006) moved to Argentina at the age of 17. She received her Ph.D. in astronomy at La Plata observatory, where she has conducted her professional work. Her main field of research is massive stars, an area to which she has contributed over 150 refereed papers	JPL · 5289
5290 Langevin	1990 OD_{4}	Yves Langevin (born 1951), French planetary scientist at the Institut d'Astrophysique Spatiale in Orsay. He is the great-grandson of Marie Skłodowska-Curie.	MPC · 5290
5291 Yuuko	1990 YT	Yuuko Matsuyama, wife of discoverer	MPC · 5291
5292 Mackwell	1991 AJ_{1}	Stephen J. Mackwell (born 1956) is the Director of the Lunar and Planetary Institute.	JPL · 5292
5293 Bentengahama	1991 BQ_{2}	Benten beach (Bentengahama), a sandy beach near Kushiro in northern Japan, where the co-discoverer, Kazuro Watanabe, spent his childhood.	MPC · 5293
5294 Onnetoh	1991 CB	Lake Onnetō, Hokkaidō, Japan	MPC · 5294
5295 Masayo	1991 CE	Masayo Mizuno, wife of discoverer	MPC · 5295
5296 Friedrich	9546 P-L	Caspar David Friedrich (1774–1840), German Romantic landscape painter	MPC · 5296
5297 Schinkel	4170 T-2	Karl Friedrich Schinkel (1781–1841), German architect and painter	MPC · 5297
5298 Paraskevopoulos	1966 PK	John Stefanos Paraskevopoulos, Greek astronomer, director of the Athens Observatory and later superintendent of the Boyden Observatory	JPL · 5298
5299 Bittesini	1969 LB	Luciano Bittesini (born 1950), Italian amateur astronomer and astrometrist at Farra d'Isonzo Observatory	MPC · 5299
5300 Sats	1974 SX_{1}	Nataliya Il'inichna Sats (1903–1993), Soviet author and founder of the Moscow Musical Children's Theater	MPC · 5300

== 5301–5400 ==
back to top

Named minor planet	Provisional	This minor planet was named for...	Ref · Catalog
5301 Novobranets	1974 SD_{3}	Vasilij Andreevich Novobranets (1904–1984), Russian and Ukrainian writer.	JPL · 5301
5302 Romanoserra	1976 YF_{5}	Romano Serra (born 1954), Italian physicist	MPC · 5302
5303 Parijskij	1978 TT_{2}	Yurij Nikolaevich Parijskij (born 1932), Russian radio astronomer and cosmologist	MPC · 5303
5304 Bazhenov	1978 TA_{7}	Vasily Bazhenov (1737–1799), Russian architect	MPC · 5304
5305 Bernievolz	1978 VS_{5}	Bernard Volz (born 1961), American amateur astronomer and former president of the Amherst Area Amateur Astronomers Association	JPL · 5305
5306 Fangfen	1980 BB	Fen Fang, Chinese astronomer	MPC · 5306
5307 Paul-André	1980 YC	Paul-André Herbelin (1933–1994), Swiss friend of the American discoverer Edward Bowell	MPC · 5307
5308 Hutchison	1981 DC_{2}	Robert Hutchison (born 1938) former curator of meteorites at the Natural History Museum, London	JPL · 5308
5309 MacPherson	1981 ED_{25}	Glenn Joseph MacPherson (born 1950), curator at the National Museum of Natural History in Washington, D.C.	JPL · 5309
5310 Papike	1981 EP_{26}	James Papike (born 1937), director emeritus of the Institute of Meteoritics at the University of New Mexico.	JPL · 5310
5311 Rutherford	1981 GD_{1}	Ernest Rutherford (1871–1937), born and educated in New Zealand, won the 1908 Nobel Prize for Chemistry for his work on radioactive disintegration of elements. He was the first to develop radioactive dating of the Earth, established the nuclear atom, and predicted the existence of the neutron.	IAU · 5311
5312 Schott	1981 VP_{2}	Otto Schott (1851–1935), a German chemist, glass technologist, and the inventor of borosilicate glass	MPC · 5312
5313 Nunes	1982 SC_{2}	Pedro Nunes (1502–1578), Portuguese mathematician and geographer	MPC · 5313
5314 Wilkickia	1982 SG_{4}	Andrey Vilkitsky (1858–1913) and Boris Vilkitsky (1885–1961), father and son, Russian hydrographers and Arctic explorers	MPC · 5314
5315 Balʹmont	1982 SV_{5}	Konstantin Balmont (1867–1942), a Russian symbolist poet and translator	MPC · 5315
5316 Filatov	1982 UB_{7}	Vladimir Filatov (1875–1956), ophthalmologist and surgeon	MPC · 5316
5317 Verolacqua	1983 CE	Veronica Lynn Passalacqua, a volunteer who compiled the International Comet Quarterly archive of photometric data on comets	MPC · 5317
5318 Dientzenhofer	1985 HG_{1}	Kryštof Dientzenhofer, Czech architect	MPC · 5318
5319 Petrovskaya	1985 RK_{6}	Margarita Sergeevna Petrovskaya (Russian: Петровская, Маргарита Сергеевна, born 1933), Russian astronomer and staff member of the Institute of Theoretical Astronomy in Saint Petersburg	MPC · 5319
5320 Lisbeth	1985 VD	Lisbeth Fogh Olsen, daughter of Danish co-discoverer Hans Jørn Fogh Olsen	MPC · 5320
5321 Jagras	1985 VN	Jakob Grove Rasmussen, fiancé of the daughter of Danish co-discoverer Hans Jørn Fogh Olsen	MPC · 5321
5322 Ghaffari	1986 QB_{1}	Abolghassem Ghaffari (1907–2013) was a Persian-American mathematician and physicist. Ghaffari created optimization techniques for Earth-Moon trajectory problems, novel analytical techniques for change maneuvers in interplanetary trajectories, and studied the effects of solar radiation pressure and general relativity on Earth-orbiting satellites.	IAU · 5322
5323 Fogh	1986 TL_{4}	Hans Jørn Fogh Olsen (born 1943), Danish astronomer and discoverer of minor planets at Brorfelde Observatory	JPL · 5323
5324 Lyapunov	1987 SL	Aleksandr Mikhailovich Lyapunov (1857–1918), Russian mathematician, engineer and physicist	MPC · 5324
5325 Silver	1988 JQ	Leon Silver (born 1925), professor of geology at Caltech	MPC · 5325
5326 Vittoriosacco	1988 RT_{6}	Vittorio Sacco (born 1941), an Italian amateur astronomer and popularizer of astronomy.	JPL · 5326
5327 Gertwilkens	1989 EX_{1}	Gert Wilkens (born 1957) has been the financial administrator of Stichting De Koepel, former Dutch center for the popularization of astronomy and space science. He serves as librarian of the astronomical library of Sonnenborgh Observatory in Utrecht in the Netherlands. Wilkens is a co-editor of the astronomical annual Sterrengids.	IAU · 5327
5328 Nisiyamakoiti	1989 UH_{1}	Koichi Nishiyama, Japanese mountaineer and amateur astronomer, meteor, comet, and nova hunter	JPL · 5328
5329 Decaro	1989 YP	Mario De Caro, Italian philosopher	JPL · 5329
5330 Senrikyu	1990 BQ_{1}	Sen no Rikyū, Japanese tea master	MPC · 5330
5331 Erimomisaki	1990 BT_{1}	Cape Erimo, Hokkaidō, Japan	MPC · 5331
5332 Davidaguilar	1990 DA	David Aguilar, American director of public affairs at the Harvard-Smithsonian Center for Astrophysics, astronomical photographer, and telescope maker	JPL · 5332
5333 Kanaya	1990 UH	Kanaya, Shizuoka, Japan	MPC · 5333
5334 Mishima	1991 CF	Mishima, Shizuoka, Japan	MPC · 5334
5335 Damocles	1991 DA	Damocles, mythological Greek figure	MPC · 5335
5336 Kley	1991 JE_{1}	Willy Kley (1958–2021) was a German astrophysicist and a Professor of Computational Astrophysics at the University of Tübingen, Germany. He was an expert on hydrodynamical simulations in the context of the formation of planets and planetary systems with a special focus on planet-disk interaction and planet migration.	IAU · 5336
5337 Aoki	1991 LD	Masahiro Aoki (1920–1984), Japanese amateur astronomer	MPC · 5337
5338 Michelblanc	1991 RJ_{5}	Michel Blanc (born 1949), French planetary scientist and director of the Pic du Midi Observatory	JPL · 5338
5339 Desmars	1992 CD	Josselin Desmars (b. 1980), a French astronomer.	IAU · 5339
5340 Burton	4027 P-L	William Butler Burton (born 1940), American professor of astronomy at the University of Leiden	MPC · 5340
5341 Purgathofer	6040 P-L	Alois Purgathofer (1925–1983), Austrian astronomer	MPC · 5341
5342 Le Poole	3129 T-2	Rudolf Le Poole (born 1942), Dutch astronomer at Leiden	MPC · 5342
5343 Ryzhov	1977 SG_{3}	Yurij Aleksandrovich Ryzhov (born 1930), a member of the Russian Academy of Sciences	MPC · 5343
5344 Ryabov	1978 RN	Yurij Aleksandrovich Ryabov (born 1923), professor at the Moscow Road-Transport Institute	MPC · 5344
5345 Boynton	1981 EY_{8}	William Boynton (born 1944), professor of cosmochemistry and geochemistry at the University of Arizona, has measured elemental abundances in meteorites as a means of probing the early history of the solar system. He is the team leader for the gamma-ray spectrometer on the 2001 Mars Odyssey spacecraft	JPL · 5345
5346 Benedetti	1981 QE_{e}	Mario Benedetti (1920–2009), an internationally renowned Uruguayan writer and member of the so-called 45 Generation of writers, essayists and poets. He received several national and international awards, including the VII Premio Reina Sofia de Poesia Iberoamericana in 1999.	IAU · 5346
5347 Orestelesca	1985 DX_{2}	Oreste Lesca, amateur astronomer.	JPL · 5347
5348 Kennoguchi	1988 BB	Ken Noguchi (b.~1973) is a Japanese alpinist and environmental activist. In 1999 he reached the summit of Mt. Everest and became the youngest person in the world (at that time) to climb the highest mountains on each of the seven continents	JPL · 5348
5349 Paulharris	1988 RA	Paul P. Harris (1868–1947), founder of Rotary International in 1905	MPC · 5349
5350 Epetersen	1989 GL_{1}	Erik V. Petersen (born 1911), Danish amateur astronomer	MPC · 5350
5351 Diderot	1989 SG_{5}	Denis Diderot, French writer	MPC · 5351
5352 Fujita	1989 YN	Yoshio Fujita, Japanese astrophysicist and professor emeritus of the University of Tokyo	MPC · 5352
5353 Baillié	1989 YT	Kevin Baillié (b. 1980), a French astronomer.	IAU · 5353
5354 Hisayo	1990 BJ_{2}	Hisayo Kaneda, daughter of second discoverer.	JPL · 5354
5355 Akihiro	1991 CA	Akihiro Ueda, son of first discoverer.	JPL · 5355
5356 Neagari	1991 FF_{1}	Neagari, the name of an old town in Nomi District, Ishikawa Prefecture, Japan.	JPL · 5356
5357 Sekiguchi	1992 EL	Tomohiko Sekiguchi (born 1970), an associate professor at Hokkaido University of Education since 2008.	JPL · 5357
5358 Meineko	1992 QH	Meineko is the pen name of Kiyota Seiichiro (born 1962), who has been observing variable stars since 1975. As Meineko, he has written a monthly guide on variable stars in the Japanese astronomy magazine Gekkan Tenmon and on CCD observation methods in textbooks.	IAU · 5358
5359 Markzakharov	1974 QX_{1}	Mark Anatolievich Zakharov (born 1933), Russian producer	MPC · 5359
5360 Rozhdestvenskij	1975 VD_{9}	Robert Ivanovich Rozhdestvenskij (1932–1994), Russian poet, journalist and popular songwriter	MPC · 5360
5361 Goncharov	1976 YC_{2}	Ivan Goncharov (1812–1891) is known for his four novels Oblomov, Obryv ("The Precipice"), Obyknovennaya istoriya ("The Same Old Story") and Fregat "Pallada" ("Frigate Pallada").	JPL · 5361
5362 Johnyoung	1978 CH	John W. Young (1930–2018) was a United States naval aviator and test pilot and NASA astronaut. He flew on Gemini 3, Gemini 10, Apollo 10, Apollo 16 (becoming the ninth person to walk on the Moon), and commanded two Space Shuttle missions (STS-1 and STS-9).	JPL · 5362
5363 Kupka	1979 UQ	František Kupka (1871–1957), Czech painter and graphic artist	MPC · 5363
5364 Christophschäfer	1980 RC_{1}	Christoph Schäfer (b. 1975), a German astrophysicist.	IAU · 5364
5365 Fievez	1981 EN_{1}	Charles Fiévez (1844–1890), pioneer of astronomical spectroscopy in Belgium †	MPC · 5365
5366 Rhianjones	1981 EY_{30}	Rhian Jones (born 1960), an experimental and sample petrologist at the Institute of Meteoritics at the University of New Mexico.	JPL · 5366
5367 Sollenberger	1982 TT	Paul Sollenberger (1891–1995), American astronomer and first civilian director of Time Service at the United States Naval Observatory	MPC · 5367
5368 Vitagliano	1984 SW_{5}	Aldo Vitagliano (born 1948), Italian astronomer	JPL · 5368
5369 Virgiugum	1985 SE_{1}	Jungfraujoch (latinized), a site in the Swiss Alps and location of the Sphinx Observatory	MPC · 5369
5370 Taranis	1986 RA	Celtic god Taranis	MPC · 5370
5371 Albertoaccomazzi	1987 VG_{1}	Alberto Accomazzi (b. 1964) is an American scientist at the Harvard-Smithsonian Center for Astrophysics	MPC · 5371
5372 Bikki	1987 WS	Bikki Sunazawa, Ainu sculptor	MPC · 5372
5373 Michaelkurtz	1988 VV_{3}	Michael Kurtz (b. 1947) is an American astronomer and computer scientist at the Harvard-Smithsonian Center for Astrophysics	MPC · 5373
5374 Hokutosei	1989 AM_{1}	Hokutosei, Japanese overnight limited express	MPC · 5374
5375 Siedentopf	1989 AN_{6}	Heinrich Siedentopf (1906–1963), a German astronomer and director of the Jena Observatory and Sternwarte Tübingen	MPC · 5375
5376 Maruthiakella	1990 DD	Maruthi R. Akella (born 1972), Indian-American aerospace engineer and Professor of Aerospace Engineering and Engineering Mechanics at the University of Texas at Austin	MPC · 5376
5377 Komori	1991 FM	Yukimasa Komori (1900–), Japanese owner of Astro-Dome. He was also a member of the committee at Gotoh Planetarium	MPC · 5377
5378 Ellyett	1991 GD	Clifton Darfield Ellyett (born 1915), pioneer of radar meteor research in New Zealand	MPC · 5378
5379 Abehiroshi	1991 HG	Hiroshi Abe (born 1958), a discoverer of numerous minor planets at Yatsuka Observatory since 1993.	JPL · 5379
5380 Sprigg	1991 JT	Reg Sprigg (1919–1994), an Australian exploration geologist, oceanographer, biologist, author and conservationist.	JPL · 5380
5381 Sekhmet	1991 JY	Sekhmet, Egyptian goddess	MPC · 5381
5382 McKay	1991 JR_{2}	Christopher P. McKay, (born 1954), space scientist and exobiologist at NASA-Ames Research Center.	JPL · 5382
5383 Leavitt	4293 T-2	Henrietta Swan Leavitt (1868–1921), American astronomer and discoverer of the luminosity–period relation for Cepheids	MPC · 5383
5384 Changjiangcun	1957 VA	Changjiangcun, Jiangsu province, China, "the famous flower of Yangtze River", Chinese homonym of the Yangtze River	JPL · 5384
5385 Kamenka	1975 TS_{3}	Kamenka (Kamianka), a town in central Ukraine	JPL · 5385
5386 Bajaja	1975 TH_{6}	Esteban Bajaja (born 1931), Argentine radio-astronomer	JPL · 5386
5387 Casleo	1980 NB	The Leoncito Astronomical Complex (CASLEO) in Argentina	JPL · 5387
5388 Mottola	1981 ED_{1}	Stefano Mottola, Italian astronomer and a discoverer of minor planets	MPC · 5388
5389 Choikaiyau	1981 UB_{10}	Kai-Yau Choi, Chinese director of the Zhongshan Scientific Center and chairman of the Choi Educational Foundation	MPC · 5389
5390 Huichiming	1981 YO_{1}	For his help in alleviating poverty, Hui Chi Ming (born 1964) received the China Glory Facilitative Poverty Aid Award and the United Nations Humanity and Peace Promotion Award.	JPL · 5390
5391 Emmons	1985 RE_{2}	Richard H. Emmons (1919–2005), American physicist and astronomy educator	MPC · 5391
5392 Parker	1986 AK	Donald C. Parker (1939–2015), American amateur astronomer	MPC · 5392
5393 Goldstein	1986 ET	Richard M. Goldstein (1927–2024), radar astronomer at the Jet Propulsion Laboratory	MPC · 5393
5394 Jurgens	1986 EZ_{1}	Raymond Francis Jurgens (born 1937), American radar astronomer at the Jet Propulsion Laboratory	MPC · 5394
5395 Shosasaki	1988 RK_{11}	Sho Sasaki (born 1960), a professor at the University of Tokyo.	JPL · 5395
5396 Kathleenhowell	1988 SH_{1}	Kathleen C. Howell (born 1951), Professor of Aeronautics and Astronautics at Purdue University.	JPL · 5396
5397 Vojislava	1988 VB_{5}	Vojislava Protić–Benišek (born 1946), daughter of Serbian astronomer Milorad B. Protić	JPL · 5397
5398 Jennifergannon	1989 AK_{1}	Jennifer Gannon (1978–2024), American heliophysicist.	JPL · 5398
5399 Awa	1989 BT	Awa Province, ancient name of Tokushima prefecture, Japan	MPC · 5399
5400 Anniewalker	1989 CM	Anne (Annie) Walker (1863–1940), the second female professional observational astronomer in Britain.	MPC · 5400

== 5401–5500 ==
back to top

Named minor planet	Provisional	This minor planet was named for...	Ref · Catalog
5401 Minamioda	1989 EV	Minamioda, Kamikawa, Hyōgo, Japan	MPC · 5401
5402 Kejosmith	1989 UK_{2}	Keith C. Smith and his wife Joan Furlong, stellar and laboratory spectroscopists University College, London, respectively	MPC · 5402
5403 Takachiho	1990 DM	Takachiho, Miyazaki, Japan	MPC · 5403
5404 Uemura	1991 EE_{1}	Naomi Uemura, Japanese adventurer	MPC · 5404
5405 Neverland	1991 GY	Neverland, fictional land where Peter Pan, Tinker Bell and other mythical creatures and beings live	MPC · 5405
5406 Jonjoseph	1991 PH_{11}	Jonathan Joseph, programmer analyst at the Department of Astronomy of Cornell University Src	MPC · 5406
5408 Thé	1232 T-1	Pik-Sin Thé (1927–2017), an Indonesian astronomer, who was a member of the IAU and director of Bosscha Observatory †	MPC · 5408
5409 Saale	1962 SR	Saale, German river	MPC · 5409
5410 Spivakov	1967 DA	Vladimir Spivakov (born 1944 ), Russian conductor and violinist	MPC · 5410
5411 Liia	1973 AT_{3}	Liia Forrer-Tsiganovskaja, wife of a friend of Russian discoverer Nikolai Chernykh	MPC · 5411
5412 Rou	1973 SR_{3}	Aleksandr Arturovich Rou (1906–1973), Russian actor and film producer	MPC · 5412
5413 Smyslov	1977 EC_{2}	Vasily Smyslov (1921–2010), Russian chess grandmaster and World Chess Champion from 1957 to 1958	MPC · 5413
5414 Sokolov	1977 RW_{6}	Viktor Georgievich Sokolov (born 1946), Russian astronomer and staff member at the Institute for Theoretical Astronomy (ITA)	MPC · 5414
5415 Lyanzuridi	1978 TB_{2}	Konstantin Petrovich Lyanzuridi (born 1934), engineer in vacuum technology and optics who has worked at the Crimean Astrophysical Observatory	JPL · 5415
5416 Estremadoyro	1978 VE_{5}	Víctor Antolí Estremadoyro Robles (1913–2003), Peruvian astronomer, founder of the Peruvian Association of Astronomy and the Iberoamerican League of Astronomy	JPL · 5416
5417 Solovaya	1981 QT	Nina A. Solovaya (born 1940), Russian astronomer and a celestial mechanic at Sternberg Astronomical Institute	MPC · 5417
5418 Joyce	1981 QG_{1}	James Joyce, Irish writer	MPC · 5418
5419 Benua	1981 SW_{7}	Nicholas Benois (Benua), Russian architect, and his sons Leon Benois, Russian architect, and Alexandre Benois, Russian painter	MPC · 5419
5420 Jancis	1982 JR_{1}	Jancis Robinson, British Master of Wine, editor of The Oxford Companion to Wine, weekly contributor to the Financial Times	JPL · 5420
5421 Ulanova	1982 TD_{2}	Galina Sergeyevna Ulanova, Russian ballerina	MPC · 5421
5422 Hodgkin	1982 YL_{1}	Dorothy Hodgkin (1910–1994), British biochemist and Nobel Prize laureate	MPC · 5422
5423 Horahořejš	1983 DC	Petr Hora Hořejš (born 1938), a Czech journalist, screenwriter and novelist.	JPL · 5423
5424 Covington	1983 TN_{1}	Arthur Edwin Covington, first Canadian radio-astronomer	MPC · 5424
5425 Vojtěch	1984 SA_{1}	Václav Vojtěch (1901–1932), Czech Antarctic explorer	MPC · 5425
5426 Sharp	1985 DD	Robert P. Sharp (1911–2004), American professor of geology at Caltech. Expert on glaciers, the movement of sand dunes and the geology of Mars.	MPC · 5426
5427 Jensmartin	1986 JQ	Jens Martin Knudsen, Danish astrophysicist	MPC · 5427
5430 Luu	1988 JA_{1}	Jane Luu (born 1963), Vietnamese-American astronomer and co-discoverer of the first classical Kuiper belt object, (15760) 1992 QB1	MPC · 5430
5431 Maxinehelin	1988 MB	Maxine Anne Helin, mother-in-law of American discoverer Eleanor F. Helin	MPC · 5431
5432 Imakiire	1988 VN	Kyōko Imakiire (born 1965), Japanese yachtswoman	MPC · 5432
5433 Kairen	1988 VZ_{2}	Imakiire's Yacht	MPC · 5433
5434 Tomwhitney	1989 ES	Thomas (Tom) D. Whitney (born 1941), longtime president of the Amherst Area Amateur Astronomers Association	JPL · 5434
5435 Kameoka	1990 BS_{1}	Kameoka, Kyoto, Japan	MPC · 5435
5436 Eumelos	1990 DK	Eumelos, mythical person related to Trojan War	MPC · 5436
5438 Lorre	1990 QJ	Jean Lorre, an American scientist at JPL's Image Processing Laboratory	MPC · 5438
5439 Couturier	1990 RW	Pierre Couturier (born 1942), French physicist and director of the Paris Observatory from 1999 to 2003	MPC · 5439
5440 Terao	1991 HD	Hisashi Terao (1855–1923), first Japanese professor of astronomy at University of Tokyo	MPC · 5440
5441 Andymurray	1991 JZ_{1}	Andy Murray (born 1987), Scottish professional tennis player.	JPL · 5441
5442 Drossart	1991 NH_{1}	Pierre Drossart (born 1956), researcher of the CNRS at Paris Observatory	MPC · 5442
5443 Encrenaz	1991 NX_{1}	Thérèse Encrenaz (born 1946), French astronomer, Director of Research at CNRS and Director of the Space Research Department at Paris Observatory	MPC · 5443
5444 Gautier	1991 PM_{8}	Daniel Gautier (born 1936), French astronomer at Paris Observatory	MPC · 5444
5445 Williwaw	1991 PA_{12}	Williwaw, a dramatic mountain on the skyline of Anchorage.	JPL · 5445
5446 Heyler	1991 PB_{13}	Gene A. Heyler (born 1956), of the Applied Physics Laboratory of Johns Hopkins University and contributor to the NEAR Shoemaker mission †	MPC · 5446
5447 Lallement	1991 PO_{14}	Rosine Lallement (born 1951), French astrophysicist	MPC · 5447
5448 Siebold	1992 SP	Philipp Franz von Siebold (1796–1866), German medical doctor, botanist and traveler, who stayed in Japan for six years	MPC · 5448
5450 Sokrates	2780 P-L	Socrates, Ancient Greek philosopher	MPC · 5450
5451 Plato	4598 P-L	Plato, Ancient Greek philosopher	MPC · 5451
5453 Zakharchenya	1975 VS_{5}	Boris Petrovich Zakharchenya (born 1928), Russian scientist at Ioffe Institute in Saint Petersburg	JPL · 5453
5454 Kojiki	1977 EW_{5}	Kojiki, the first written mythology of Japan	MPC · 5454
5455 Surkov	1978 RV_{5}	Vladimir Vasil'evich Surkov (born 1945), Russian database expert and staff member of the Moscow Aviation Institute	MPC · 5455
5456 Merman	1979 HH_{3}	Grigorij (Hirsh) Aronovich Merman (born 1921), staff member of the Institute of Theoretical Astronomy (ITA) in Saint Petersburg	MPC · 5456
5457 Queen's	1980 TW_{5}	Queen's University, Kingston, Canada	MPC · 5457
5458 Aizman	1980 TB_{12}	Mikhail Iosifovich Aizman (born 1947), Russian telecommunications specialist and president of MTU-INFORM, a large telephone communication and data transfer system in Russia	MPC · 5458
5459 Saraburger	1981 QP_{3}	Sara Schöffer-Burger (born 1894), who helped Dutch Jews in World War II	MPC · 5459
5460 Tsénaatʼaʼí	1983 AW	Navajo for "flying rock" (1996 Flagstaff Festival of Science asteroid naming contest winner)	MPC · 5460
5461 Autumn	1983 HB_{1}	Autumn Dongxia Thomas (born 2002), is the granddaughter of Norman G. Thomas who discovered this minor planet.	JPL · 5461
5463 Danwelcher	1985 TO	Dan Welcher (born 1948), American composer and conductor	MPC · 5463
5464 Weller	1985 VC_{1}	Harold Weller (born 1941), American conductor	MPC · 5464
5465 Chumakov	1986 RF_{13}	Mikhail Chumakov (1909–1993), Russian microbiologist and virologist	MPC · 5465
5466 Makibi	1986 WP_{8}	Kibi Makibi, Japanese scholar and noble	MPC · 5466
5468 Hamatonbetsu	1988 BK	Hamatonbetsu, Hokkaidō, Japan	MPC · 5468
5470 Kurtlindstrom	1988 BK_{5}	Kurt Leighton Lindstrom (born 1955), American program executive for NASA's New Horizons Pluto-Kuiper Belt mission	JPL · 5470
5471 Tunguska	1988 PK_{1}	Tunguska, site of a presumed asteroidal impact	MPC · 5471
5473 Yamanashi	1988 VR	Yamanashi Prefecture, Japan	MPC · 5473
5474 Gingasen	1988 XE_{1}	Furusato Ginga Line of Hokkaidō Chihoku Kōgen Railway, Japan (Abolished in 2006)	MPC · 5474
5475 Hanskennedy	1989 QO	Hans D. Kennedy (born 1924) is a Dutch-Australian astronomer	JPL · 5475
5476 Mulius	1989 TO_{11}	Mulius, a Trojan warrior in Greek mythology. He was killed during the Trojan War by Achilles, who drove his javelin through one ear and out the other of Mulius' head.	IAU · 5476
5477 Holmes	1989 UH_{2}	Robert E. Holmes Jr. (b.~1956), amateur astronomer, who directs the Astronomical Research Observatory in Westfield, Illinois	JPL · 5477
5478 Wartburg	1989 UE_{4}	The Wartburg Castle, in central Germany	MPC · 5478
5479 Grahamryder	1989 UT_{5}	Graham Ryder (1949–2002), British lunar geologist	MPC · 5479
5481 Kiuchi	1990 CH	Tsuruhiko Kiuchi (born 1954), Japanese amateur astronomer	MPC · 5481
5482 Korankei	1990 DX	Kōrankei, a Japanese town located in the middle of Aichi prefecture	JPL · 5482
5483 Cherkashin	1990 UQ_{11}	Andrej Andreevich Cherkashin (1920–1993), a Russian literary scholar and historian, researcher of A. S. Pushkin's genealogy and author of The Millennial Family Tree of Pushkin	JPL · 5483
5484 Inoda	1990 VH_{1}	Shigeru Inoda, Japanese amateur astronomer	MPC · 5484
5485 Kaula	1991 RQ_{21}	William M. Kaula, Australian-American geophysicist Src	MPC · 5485
5488 Kiyosato	1991 VK_{5}	Kiyosato, a town of Hokuto, Yamanashi, Japan	MPC · 5488
5489 Oberkochen	1993 BF_{2}	Oberkochen, town in southern Germany	MPC · 5489
5490 Burbidge	2019 P-L	Margaret Burbidge (1919–2020), British astrophysicist	MPC · 5490
5491 Kaulbach	3128 T-1	Wilhelm von Kaulbach (1805–1874), a German painter	MPC · 5491
5492 Thoma	3227 T-1	Hans Thoma (1839–1924), German painter	MPC · 5492
5493 Spitzweg	1617 T-2	Carl Spitzweg (1808–1885), German painter	MPC · 5493
5494 Johanmohr	1933 UM_{1}	Johan Maurits Mohr (1716–1775), Dutch-German pastor, astronomer and meteorologist	JPL · 5494
5495 Rumyantsev	1972 RY_{3}	Nikolay Rumyantsev (1754–1826), Foreign Minister and Chancellor of the Russian Empire	MPC · 5495
5497 Sararussell	1975 SS	Sara Russell (born 1966), British meteoriticist at the Natural History Museum	MPC · 5497
5498 Gustafsson	1980 FT_{3}	Bengt Gustafsson (born 1943), Swedish astronomer	MPC · 5498
5500 Twilley	1981 WR	Royston C. Twilley, British teacher of the discoverer Edward L. G. Bowell	MPC · 5500

== 5501–5600 ==
back to top

Named minor planet	Provisional	This minor planet was named for...	Ref · Catalog
5502 Brashear	1984 EC	John Brashear (1840–1920), American astronomer and instrument builder	MPC · 5502
5504 Lanzerotti	1985 FC_{2}	Louis J. Lanzerotti (born 1938), an American space physicist	MPC · 5504
5505 Rundetaarn	1986 VD_{1}	The "Rundetaarn", or Round Tower, is the astronomical observatory built in the heart of Copenhagen from 1637 to 1642 by king Christian IV. Its unique interior spiral staircase makes it possible to stroll all the way to the top.	JPL · 5505
5506 Artiglio	1987 SV_{11}	The Artiglio, an Italian steamship used as a salvage ship in the early 20th century.	JPL · 5506
5507 Niijima	1987 UJ	Tsuneo Niijima, Japanese amateur astronomer	MPC · 5507
5508 Gomyou	1988 EB	Gomyou, north of Kakegawa, Japan. Location of the discovering Oohira Station.	MPC · 5508
5509 Rennsteig	1988 RD_{3}	The Rennsteig, a long ridge walk in the Thuringian Forest, Germany	MPC · 5509
5511 Cloanthus	1988 TH_{1}	Cloanthus, mythical person related to Trojan War: Cloanthus wins the ship race held as part of Anchises' funeral games (Aeneid, Book V)	MPC · 5511
5513 Yukio	1988 WB	Yukio Hasegawa (born 1950), Japanese amateur astronomer and telescope maker	MPC · 5513
5514 Karelraška	1989 BN_{1}	Karel Raška (1909–1987), Czech medical doctor and epidemiologist, known as "the father of the conception of epidemiologic surveillance".	JPL · 5514
5515 Naderi	1989 EL_{1}	Firouz Naderi (1946-2023) is a scientist, engineer and manager who has led major programs at the Jet Propulsion Laboratory.	JPL · 5515
5516 Jawilliamson	1989 JK	Jack Williamson, American science-fiction author	MPC · 5516
5517 Johnerogers	1989 LJ	John E. Rogers, American amateur astronomer known for his computer software and for his computation of orbits	MPC · 5517
5518 Mariobotta	1989 YF	Mario Botta (born 1943), a Swiss architect	MPC · 5518
5519 Lellouch	1990 QB_{4}	Emmanuel Lellouch (born 1963), planetary scientist at Observatoire de Paris.	JPL · 5519
5520 Natori	1990 RB	Akira Natori (born 1956), Japanese astronomer and discoverer of minor planets	MPC · 5520
5521 Morpurgo	1991 PM_{1}	Pieter Morpurgo, British producer of the long-running BBC programme The Sky at Night	MPC · 5521
5522 De Rop	1991 PJ_{5}	Willy De Rop (born 1933), Belgian astronomer at Uccle Observatory	MPC · 5522
5523 Luminet	1991 PH_{8}	Jean-Pierre Luminet (born 1951), French researcher at the Paris Observatory.	JPL · 5523
5524 Lecacheux	1991 RA_{30}	Jean Lecacheux, a French planetary scientist at Paris Observatory	MPC · 5524
5526 Kenzo	1991 UP_{1}	Kenzo Suzuki, Japanese amateur astronomer	MPC · 5526
5529 Perry	2557 P-L	Marcus Perry, an American chief engineer with the Spacewatch program	MPC · 5529
5530 Eisinga	2835 P-L	Eise Eisinga, Frisian astronomer who built a planetarium	MPC · 5530
5531 Carolientje	1051 T-2	Caroline van Houten, granddaughter of the Dutch astronomers (husband and wife) Cornelis and Ingrid van Houten	MPC · 5531
5532 Ichinohe	1932 CY	Naozō Ichinohe (1872–1920), Japanese astronomer and science writer	MPC · 5532
5533 Bagrov	1935 SC	Nikolaj Vasil'evich Bagrov (born 1937), Russian geographer at the Simferopol State University	MPC · 5533
5535 Annefrank	1942 EM	Anne Frank (Annelies Frank), German Jewish diarist	MPC · 5535
5536 Honeycutt	1955 QN	Kent Honeycutt (born 1940), on the faculty of Indiana University, has made fundamental contributions to our understanding of the structure of accretion disks, cataclysmic variables and cool stars, as well as to the design and construction of innovative instrumentation, including spectrographs and robotic observatories.	JPL · 5536
5537 Sanya	1964 TA_{2}	Sanya, located on the southern tip of Hainan Island, is the only tropical seaside tourist city in China.	JPL · 5537
5538 Luichewoo	1964 TU_{2}	Lui Che-woo, Chinese mineralogist	MPC · 5538
5539 Limporyen	1965 UA_{1}	Lim Por-yen (born 1914), a prestigious philanthropist who helped launch many schools and a first-class Limporyen library in China.	JPL · 5539
5540 Smirnova	1971 QR_{1}	Tamara Mikhailovna Smirnova, Russian astronomer	MPC · 5540
5541 Seimei	1976 UH_{16}	Abe no Seimei, Onmyōji	MPC · 5541
5542 Moffatt	1978 PT_{4}	Ethelwin Moffatt (born 1926), a benefactor of the discovering Perth Observatory and direct descendant of the first Astronomer Royal, John Flamsteed.	JPL · 5542
5543 Sharaf	1978 TW_{2}	Shafika Gil'mievna Sharaf (born 1915), a celestial mechanic and staff member at the Institute of Theoretical Astronomy (ITA) in Saint Petersburg, Russia	MPC · 5543
5544 Kazakov	1978 TH_{6}	Matvej Fedorovich Kazakov (1738–1812), Russian architect	MPC · 5544
5545 Makarov	1978 VY_{14}	Askol'd Anatol'evich Makarov (born 1925), Russian choreographer and professor of the St. Petersburg Conservatoire	MPC · 5545
5546 Salavat	1979 YS	Salavat, an industrial city in the Republic of Bashkortostan, Russia	MPC · 5546
5547 Acadiau	1980 LE_{1}	Acadia University, Canada Src	MPC · 5547
5548 Thosharriot	1980 TH	Thomas Harriot (1560–1621), English mathematician, inventor of the < and > symbols, and who drew the Moon from Syon House, near London, on 1609 July 26 (O.S.), several months before Galileo.	JPL · 5548
5549 Bobstefanik	1981 GM_{1}	Robert Phillip Stefanik (born 1938), American astronomer and director of the discovering Oak Ridge Observatory	MPC · 5549
5551 Glikson	1982 BJ	Andrew Y. Glikson, was a senior research scientist with the Australian Geological Survey	MPC · 5551
5552 Studnička	1982 SJ_{1}	František Josef Studnička, Czech mathematician	MPC · 5552
5553 Chodas	1984 CM_{1}	Paul Winchester Chodas (born 1952), Canadian astronomer and member of the Solar System Dynamics Group at the Jet Propulsion Laboratory	MPC · 5553
5554 Keesey	1985 TW_{1}	Michael S. W. Keesey (born 1937), a member of the Solar System Dynamics Group at the Jet Propulsion Laboratory.	JPL · 5554
5555 Wimberly	1986 VF_{5}	Ravenel N. Wimberly (born 1946), a member of the Solar System Dynamics Group at the Jet Propulsion Laboratory.	JPL · 5555
5557 Chimikeppuko	1989 CM_{1}	Lake Chimikeppu, Hokkaidō, Japan	MPC · 5557
5558 Johnnapier	1989 WL_{2}	John Napier of Merchiston (1550–1617), a Scottish mathematician and inventor.	JPL · 5558
5559 Beategordon	1990 MV	Beate Sirota Gordon (1923–2012), Austrian-born American performing arts presenter and women's rights advocate	JPL · 5559
5560 Amytis	1990 MX	Amytis Barrett (1909–2000), an American contributor to the Caltech community. This minor planet was named on the occasion of her 85th birthday.	MPC · 5560
5561 Iguchi	1991 QD	Masatoshi Iguchi, president of the Photovoltaic Popularization Associaction in Japan	MPC · 5561
5562 Sumi	1991 VS	Sumi Kaneda (born 2006), a granddaughter of Japanese astronomer Hiroshi Kaneda, who co-discovered this minor planet	IAU · 5562
5563 Yuuri	1991 VZ_{1}	Yuuri Ueda (born 2005), a granddaughter of Japanese astronomer Seiji Ueda, who co-discovered this minor planet	IAU · 5563
5564 Hikari	1991 VH_{2}	Hikari Ueda (born 2010), a granddaughter of Japanese astronomer Seiji Ueda, who co-discovered this minor planet	IAU · 5564
5565 Ukyounodaibu	1991 VN_{2}	Kenreimon-In Ukyō no Daibu, Japanese poet and lady-in-waiting attended to Taira no Tokuko	MPC · 5565
5567 Durisen	1953 FK_{1}	Richard H. Durisen (born 1946), on the faculty of Indiana University, has applied dynamical simulations to star and planet formation, the structure and stability of astrophysical disks and planetary ring systems, and he has used numerical hydrodynamics techniques to study gravitational instabilities in disks around young stars.	JPL · 5567
5568 Mufson	1953 TS_{2}	Stuart Mufson (born 1946), on the faculty of Indiana University, has built pioneering instrumentation for investigations in high-energy astrophysics, including cosmic-ray physics and the search for dark matter. He has also contributed to the understanding of the interstellar medium and of regions of star formation.	JPL · 5568
5569 Colby	1974 FO	Michael John Colby (born 1952), American spacecraft integration manager of NASA's New Horizons Pluto-Kuiper Belt mission.	JPL · 5569
5570 Kirsan	1976 GM_{7}	Kirsan Ilyumzhinov (born 1962), Russian chess grandmaster and president of the International Chess Federation	MPC · 5570
5571 Lesliegreen	1978 LG	Leslie Green, British treasurer of the Junior Astronomical Society (now the Society for Popular Astronomy), 1967–2007.	JPL · 5571
5572 Bliskunov	1978 SS_{2}	Aleksandr Ivanovich Bliskunov (1938–1996), orthopaedic surgeon from the Crimean Peninsula	MPC · 5572
5573 Hilarydownes	1981 QX	Hilary Downes (born 1954) is a planetary petrologist at Birkbeck College London. She is a terrestrial mantle expert, and her planetary science research seeks to understand the geological evolution of the ureilite meteorite parent body.	JPL · 5573
5574 Seagrave	1984 FS	Frank Evans Seagrave (1860–1934), an American amateur astronomer.	JPL · 5574
5575 Ryanpark	1985 RP_{2}	Sang H. ("Ryan") Park (born 1978), a member of the Jet Propulsion Laboratory's Solar System Dynamics Group.	JPL · 5575
5576 Albanese	1986 UM_{1}	Dominique Albanese, photographer and observer at the Schmidt telescope of the Observatoire de la Côte d'Azur.	MPC · 5576
5577 Priestley	1986 WQ_{2}	Joseph Priestley (1733–1804), an English clergyman.	JPL · 5577
5578 Takakura	1987 BC	Emperor Takakura (1161–1181), the 80th emperor of Japan, succeeded to the throne in 1168. He was the seventh son of emperor Goshirakawa and an expert at playing the Japanese flute.	JPL · 5578
5579 Uhlherr	1988 JL	H. Ralph Uhlherr, an Australian engineer, researcher with the USGS and collector of tektites.	MPC · 5579
5580 Sharidake	1988 RP_{1}	Mount Shari, Hokkaidō, Japan	MPC · 5580
5581 Mitsuko	1989 CY_{1}	Mitsuko Iwamoto, wife of one of discovers	MPC · 5581
5583 Braunerová	1989 EY_{1}	Zdenka Braunerová, Czech artist	MPC · 5583
5584 Izenberg	1989 KK	Noam Raphael Izenberg (born 1967), of the Applied Physics Laboratory of Johns Hopkins University and contributor to the NEAR Shoemaker mission Src	MPC · 5584
5585 Parks	1990 MJ	Robert J. Parks (1922–2011), a US aerospace engineer and deputy director at the Jet Propulsion Laboratory	MPC · 5585
5588 Jennabelle	1990 SW_{2}	Jenna Belle Weathers Roman, grandmother of the discoverer	JPL · 5588
5589 De Meis	1990 SD_{14}	Salvatore De Meis (1930–2016), of Milan, is engaged in the application of astronomical calculations to the dating of historical events, particularly of Babylonian astronomy.	JPL · 5589
5591 Koyo	1990 VF_{2}	Koyo Kawanishi, Japanese amateur astronomer	MPC · 5591
5592 Oshima	1990 VB_{4}	Yoshiaki Oshima, Japanese amateur astronomer	MPC · 5592
5593 Jonsujatha	1991 JN_{1}	Jonathan Brian Marsden and Sujatha Nagarajan, friends and neighbors of American discoverer Eleanor F. Helin	MPC · 5593
5594 Jimmiller	1991 NK_{1}	James K. Miller (born 1939), celestial mechanics and orbital dynamics expert at the Jet Propulsion Laboratory.	JPL · 5594
5595 Roth	1991 PJ	Mary Roth, administrative assistant in the Department of Astronomy at Cornell University Src	MPC · 5595
5596 Morbidelli	1991 PQ_{10}	Alessandro Morbidelli (born 1966), Italian astronomer	MPC · 5596
5597 Warren	1991 PC_{13}	Jeffrey R. Warren (born 1960), of the Applied Physics Laboratory of Johns Hopkins University and contributor to the NEAR Shoemaker mission	MPC · 5597
5598 Carlmurray	1991 PN_{18}	Carl Desmond Murray (born 1955), British astronomer, Professor of Mathematics and Astronomy at Queen Mary College London	MPC · 5598

== 5601–5700 ==
back to top

Named minor planet	Provisional	This minor planet was named for...	Ref · Catalog
5603 Rausudake	1992 CE	Mount Rausu, Hokkaidō, Japan	MPC · 5603
5605 Kushida	1993 DB	Yoshio Kushida (born 1957), Japanese seismologist	JPL · 5605
5606 Muramatsu	1993 EH	Osamu Muramatsu (born 1949), who works at the planetarium in Sibuya and who has discovered numerous minor planets and comets since 1986.	JPL · 5606
5608 Olmos	1993 EO	Edward James Olmos (born 1947), American actor	JPL · 5608
5609 Stroncone	1993 FU	Stroncone, village in central Italy and location of the Santa Lucia Stroncone Astronomical Observatory	MPC · 5609
5610 Balster	2041 T-3	Harry H. M. Balster (born 1946), Dutch amateur astronomer and his sister Yvonne	MPC · 5610
5612 Nevskij	1975 TX_{2}	Alexander Nevsky (1221–1263), a saint of the Russian Orthodox Church and legendary for his military victories over German and Swedish invaders	MPC · 5612
5613 Donskoj	1976 YP_{1}	Dmitrij Donskoj (1350–1389), grand prince of Moscow and Vladimir principalities, and great-grandson of Alexander Nevsky (also see #612)	MPC · 5613
5614 Yakovlev	1979 VN	Konstantin Karol'evich Yakovlev (born 1955), director of the scientific-production firm "Blok" in Saint Petersburg, Russia.	MPC · 5614
5615 Iskander	1983 PZ	Fazil Iskander (1929–2016), a Soviet and Russian writer and poet	MPC · 5615
5616 Vogtland	1987 ST_{10}	Vogtlandkreis (or simply: Vogtland), region in Saxony, Germany	MPC · 5616
5617 Emelyanenko	1989 EL	Vyacheslav Emelyanenko (born 1952), head of the department of theoretical mechanics at South Ural University.	JPL · 5617
5618 Saitama	1990 EA	Saitama Prefecture, Japan	JPL · 5618
5619 Shair	1990 HC_{1}	Fredrick H. Shair, Manager of the Educational Affairs Office at the Jet Propulsion Laboratory	MPC · 5619
5620 Jasonwheeler	1990 OA	Jason Wheeler Roman (born 1995), youngest son of the first discoverer	JPL · 5620
5621 Erb	1990 SG_{4}	Bryan Erb (born 1931) and Dona Marie Erb (née German), Canadian space scientists Src	MPC · 5621
5622 Percyjulian	1990 TL_{4}	Percy Lavon Julian (1899–1975) was an African American chemist. His groundbreaking work into synthesizing medical drugs from plants paved the way for medications that hundreds of millions of people use today. In his lifetime he received over one hundred medical patents.	JPL · 5622
5623 Iwamori	1990 UY	Yasuke Iwamori, late principal of Kyoto city Rakuyou technical high school who taught physics and astronomy there. Name proposed by the discoverer following a suggestion by S. Sakabe.	JPL · 5623
5624 Shirley	1991 AY_{1}	William J. and Christine Shirley, American philanthropists who have supported Caltech and Mt. Wilson Observatory and have preserved and restored the Hale Solar Laboratory in San Marino	MPC · 5624
5625 Jamesferguson	1991 AO_{2}	James Ferguson (1710–1776), a Scottish astronomer.	JPL · 5625
5626 Melissabrucker	1991 FE	Melissa J. Brucker (born 1977) researches small bodies in the solar system. As Deputy Principal Investigator for the Spacewatch Project, she organizes and makes observations of high priority Earth-approaching asteroids.	JPL · 5626
5627 Short	1991 MA	James Short (1710–1768) was a Scottish mathematician and manufacturer of optical instruments, known for his high quality telescopes used by the Royal Society for the 1761 and 1769 transits of Venus.	IAU · 5627
5628 Preussen	1991 RP_{7}	Prussia (German: Preussen), former kingdom and German state	MPC · 5628
5629 Kuwana	1993 DA_{1}	Kuwana, Mie, Japanese city located in Mie Prefecture	MPC · 5629
5630 Billschaefer	1993 FZ	William Schaefer, American amateur astronomer and telescope maker	MPC · 5630
5631 Sekihokutouge	1993 FE_{1}	Sekihoku Pass, Hokkaidō, Japan	MPC · 5631
5632 Ingelehmann	1993 GG	Inge Lehmann (1888–1993), Danish seismologist	MPC · 5632
5634 Victorborge	1978 VT_{6}	Victor Borge (1909–2000), born Borge Rosenbaum, was a Danish musician and comedian, who started his career as a classical pianist.	JPL · 5634
5635 Cole	1981 ER_{5}	Joshua Cole, fictional character in Arthur Preston Hankins' novel Cole of Spyglass Mountain	MPC · 5635
5636 Jacobson	1985 QN	Robert A. Jacobson (born 1944), an authority on spacecraft navigation techniques, and a developer of ephemerides for natural satellites at JPL	JPL · 5636
5637 Gyas	1988 RF_{1}	Gyas, a companion of Trojan hero Aeneas from classical mythology. He participated in the ship race held as part of Anchises' funeral games (Aeneid, Book V)	MPC · 5637
5638 Deikoon	1988 TA_{3}	Deicoon, mythical person related to Trojan War: son of Pergasus, killed by Agamemnon (Iliad, Book V) (not to be confused with Deicoon, one of three sons of Herakles by Megara)	MPC · 5638
5639 Ćuk	1989 PE	Matija Ćuk (born 1978), astronomer, a discoverer of the BYORP mechanism and winner of the Harold C. Urey Prize in 2014	MPC · 5639
5640 Yoshino	1989 UR_{3}	The Japanese town of Yoshino (part of Kagoshima city) in southern Japan. It is the home town of the first discoverer, Masaru Mukai	JPL · 5640
5641 McCleese	1990 DJ	Daniel J. McCleese, American planetary scientist and manager at JPL	MPC · 5641
5642 Bobbywilliams	1990 OK_{1}	Bobby G. Williams (born 1951), celestial mechanics and spacecraft navigation expert at the Jet Propulsion Laboratory.	JPL · 5642
5643 Roques	1990 QC_{2}	Françoise Roques (born 1956), French astronomer	MPC · 5643
5644 Maureenbell	1990 QG_{2}	Maureen E. Ockert-Bell (born 1961), member of the NEAR Shoemaker computer team	MPC · 5644
5647 Sarojininaidu	1990 TZ	Sarojini Naidu (1879–1949) was an Indian poet. She advocated for non-violence as a means for social change and was responsible for much of the strategic planning that eventually led to Indian independence. She is well known for writing The Golden Threshold, a collection of poems.	JPL · 5647
5648 Axius	1990 VU_{1}	Axius is a river god who was the grandfather of the Trojan ally Asteropaios and father of Pelegon who he conceived with the mortal woman Periboea.	IAU · 5648
5649 Donnashirley	1990 WZ_{2}	Donna Shirley (born 1941), American engineer and author, formerly of the Jet Propulsion Laboratory, member of the Advisory Council of the Planetary Society	MPC · 5649
5650 Mochihito-o	1990 XK	Prince Mochihito (died 1180), the third son of emperor Goshirakawa. He was a fount of knowledge, known for his poetry and for playing the Japanese flute. With Minamoto Yorimasa, he fought against the Heike without success.	JPL · 5650
5651 Traversa	1991 CA_{2}	Gilles Traversa, technical night-assistant at the Haute-Provence Observatory in France	MPC · 5651
5652 Amphimachus	1992 HS_{3}	Amphimachus from Greek mythology. Amphimachus was the son of Cteatus, a leader of the Epeians at the Trojan War and was killed by Hector.	MPC · 5652
5653 Camarillo	1992 WD_{5}	The private Camarillo Observatory (670) in Camarillo, California, on the El Camino Real, where John Rogers secured follow-up observations of this minor planet. The town was named by the Southern Pacific Railroad in 1901 in tribute to Adolfo Camarillo (1864–1958), a prominent local rancher. The first discoverer is a former town resident.	JPL · 5653
5654 Terni	1993 KG	The town and province of Terni in Italy	MPC · 5654
5655 Barney	1159 T-2	American astronomer Ida Barney (1886–1982), who worked at the Yale University Observatory and supervised the Yale Observatory Zone Catalog program	MPC · 5655
5656 Oldfield	A920 TA	Mike Oldfield (born 1953), English composer and multi-instrumentalist	MPC · 5656
5657 Groombridge	1936 QE_{1}	Stephen Groombridge (1755–1832), British merchant and astronomer who compiled the Catalogue of Circumpolar Stars	MPC · 5657
5658 Clausbaader	1950 DO	Claus Baader (1924–1995), German manufacturer of planetaria, domes and telescopes, and mentor of amateur astronomers in the German-speaking countries	MPC · 5658
5659 Vergara	1968 OA_{1}	Gladys Vergara (1928–2016), Uruguayan astronomer and a director of the Astronomical Observatory of Montevideo	JPL · 5659
5661 Hildebrand	1977 PO_{1}	Alan Russell Hildebrand (born 1955), Canadian geologist	MPC · 5661
5662 Wendycalvin	1981 EL_{4}	Wendy Marie Calvin (born 1961) has made many important contributions to the field of planetary spectroscopy. Her work has included spectral studies of the martian surface and polar caps, Charon, Callisto and Ganymede. She has also helped pioneer the concept of using aircraft in the exploration of Mars.	JPL · 5662
5663 McKeegan	1981 EQ_{12}	Kevin McKeegan (born 1958), a professor of geochemistry at the University of California in Los Angeles.	JPL · 5663
5664 Eugster	1981 EX_{43}	Otto Eugster (born 1938), professor at the University of Bern.	JPL · 5664
5665 Begemann	1982 BD_{13}	Friedrich Begemann (1927–), German pioneering cosmochemist and meteoriticist who determined the first cosmic-ray-exposure age of a meteorite. He later investigated isotopic anomalies in meteorites and established the physical conditions that produced these anomalies.	JPL · 5665
5666 Rabelais	1982 TP_{1}	François Rabelais (c. 1494–1553), French Renaissance writer, medical doctor and humanist	MPC · 5666
5667 Nakhimovskaya	1983 QH_{1}	Nakhimov Nautical College in Saint Petersburg and Russian admiral Pavel Nakhimov (1802–1855)	MPC · 5667
5668 Foucault	1984 FU	Léon Foucault (1819–1868), French physicist and astronomer known for his demonstration of the Foucault pendulum in Paris in 1851, a device demonstrating the effect of the Earth's rotation.	MPC · 5668
5670 Rosstaylor	1985 VF_{2}	Stuart Ross Taylor (1925–2021), New Zealand-born geochemist and planetary scientist known for his studies of the geology of the Moon through lunar samples	MPC · 5670
5671 Chanal	1985 XR	Roger Chanal, French amateur astronomer	MPC · 5671
5672 Libby	1986 EE_{2}	Willard Libby (1908–1980), American physical chemist noted and Nobel Prize awardee in 1960	MPC · 5672
5673 McAllister	1986 RT_{2}	Frances McAllister, American humanitarian, philanthropist and founder of "The Arboretum" at Flagstaff, Arizona	MPC · 5673
5674 Wolff	1986 RW_{2}	John M. Wolff, trustee of the Wolff Foundation	MPC · 5674
5675 Evgenilebedev	1986 RY_{5}	Evgeny Lebedev (1917–1997), Russian actor	MPC · 5675
5676 Voltaire	1986 RH_{12}	Voltaire (1694–1778), French writer	MPC · 5676
5677 Aberdonia	1987 SQ_{1}	University of Aberdeen, on the occasion of the quincentenary of its founding	MPC · 5677
5678 DuBridge	1989 TS	Lee Alvin DuBridge (1901–1994), American nuclear physicist, Director of MIT Radiation Laboratory and latterly of Caltech	MPC · 5678
5679 Akkado	1989 VR	Akka cave, Iwate, Japan	MPC · 5679
5680 Nasmyth	1989 YZ_{1}	James Hall Nasmyth (1808–1890), a Scottish engineer and astronomer.	JPL · 5680
5681 Bakulev	1990 RS_{17}	Aleksandr Nikolaevich Bakulev (1890–1967), a pioneering Soviet neurosurgeon	MPC · 5681
5682 Beresford	1990 TB	Anthony Charles Beresford (born 1942), prominent Australian amateur astronomer. Amongst his wide-ranging astronomical interests he is an active artificial satellite observer, having been part of Operation Moonwatch from 1960 to 1975. He plays an important role in the dissemination of astronomical information and discoveries in South Australia. Always knowledgeable about current events, Tony Beresford has been of considerable help to the discoverer on many occasions. Name suggested and citation endorsed by Duncan I. Steel.	JPL · 5682
5683 Bifukumonin	1990 UD	Bifukumon-In, Empress of Emperor Toba, Japan.	JPL · 5683
5684 Kogo	1990 UB_{2}	Kogō no Tsubone, consort of Emperor Takakura, Japan.	JPL · 5684
5685 Sanenobufukui	1990 XA	Sanenobu Fukui (born 1916), a well-known observer of Mars for more than 60 years.	JPL · 5685
5686 Chiyonoura	1990 YQ	Chiyo's Beach, Kushiro, Hokkaidō, Japan	MPC · 5686
5687 Yamamotoshinobu	1991 AB_{1}	Shinobu Yamamoto (1911–), director of the planetarium in Japan	MPC · 5687
5688 Kleewyck	1991 AD_{2}	Canadian artist Emily Carr (1871–1945), who was given the name "Klee Wyck" by the Indigenous peoples of the Pacific Northwest Coast	MPC · 5688
5689 Rhön	1991 RZ_{2}	Rhön Mountains, a range of volcanic mountains in Germany	MPC · 5689
5691 Fredwatson	1992 FD	Frederick Garnett Watson (born 1944) specializes in astronomical instrumentation and helped pioneer the use of fiber-optic spectroscopy. He was astronomer-in-charge of the Anglo-Australian Observatory and is currently Australia's Astronomer at Large. Through his frequent radio appearances and magazine columns, he has become a well-known public figure.	JPL · 5691
5692 Shirao	1992 FR	Motomaro Shirao, Japanese photographer and amateur astronomer	MPC · 5692
5694 Berényi	3051 P-L	Dénes Berényi (1928–2012), Hungarian nuclear physicist and director of the Institute of Nuclear Research of the Hungarian Academy of Sciences in Debrecen	MPC · 5694
5695 Remillieux	4577 P-L	Joseph Remillieux (born 1940), French physicist	MPC · 5695
5696 Ibsen	4582 P-L	Henrik Ibsen (1828–1906), Norwegian playwright	MPC · 5696
5697 Arrhenius	6766 P-L	Svante August Arrhenius (1859–1927), Swedish chemist and Nobel Laureat	MPC · 5697
5698 Nolde	4121 T-1	Emil Nolde (1867–1956), German Expressionist painter	MPC · 5698
5699 Munch	2141 T-3	Edvard Munch (1863–1944), Norwegian artist	MPC · 5699
5700 Homerus	5166 T-3	Homer, Greek epic poet and author of the Iliad from which many minor-planet names are sourced	MPC · 5700

== 5701–5800 ==
back to top

Named minor planet	Provisional	This minor planet was named for...	Ref · Catalog
5701 Baltuck	1929 VS	Miriam Baltuck (born 1954), American geologist, NASA's representative in Australia and southeast Asia, director of university advancement at the Australian National University	JPL · 5701
5702 Morando	1931 FC	Bruno Morando (born 1931), a French astronomer and director of the Bureau des Longitudes	MPC · 5702
5703 Hevelius	1931 VS	Johannes Hevelius (1611–1687), a Polish astronomer	MPC · 5703
5704 Schumacher	1950 DE	Heinrich Christian Schumacher (1780–1850), a German-Danish astronomer	MPC · 5704
5705 Ericsterken	1965 UA	Eric Sterken (1948–1998), professional gardener and landscaper who took care of the gardens of the Brussels Planetarium.	JPL · 5705
5706 Finkelstein	1971 SS_{1}	Andrej Mikhajlovich Finkelstein (born 1942), founder and director of the Russian Academy of Sciences' Institute of Applied Astronomy in St. Petersburg, and expert in relativistic celestial mechanics and radioastrometry	MPC · 5706
5707 Shevchenko	1976 GY_{3}	Vladislav Vladimirovich Shevchenko (born 1940), head of the Russian Lunar and Planetary Research Department of the Sternberg Astronomical Institute, Moscow, and member of IAU's Working Group for Planetary System Nomenclature	MPC · 5707
5708 Melancholia	1977 TC_{1}	Melancholia, one of the four humours	MPC · 5708
5709 Tamyeunleung	1977 TS_{3}	Fong Tamyeunleung (born 1924), a Chinese charity worker	JPL · 5709
5710 Silentium	1977 UP	Silentium (Latin for silence), by far the shortest official naming citation ever published	MPC · 5710
5711 Eneev	1978 SO_{4}	Timur Magometovich Eneev (born 1924), applied mathematician and celestial mechanician at the Keldysh Institute of Applied Mathematics.	JPL · 5711
5712 Funke	1979 SR	Jaromír Funke (1896–1945), a Czech photographer	MPC · 5712
5714 Krasinsky	1982 PR	Georgij Al'bertovich Krasinskij (born 1939), a staff-member of the Institute of Theoretical Astronomy (ITA) in Saint Petersburg	MPC · 5714
5715 Kramer	1982 SE_{1}	Kathryn Xymena Kramer, development director at Lowell Observatory in Flagstaff, Arizona, United States	MPC · 5715
5716 Pickard	1982 UH	Elizabeth D. Pickard, philanthropist and long-time supporter of the Lowell Observatory in Flagstaff, Arizona, United States	MPC · 5716
5717 Damir	1982 UM_{6}	Alim Matveevich Damir (1894–1982), a medical doctor and professor at the First and Second Medical Institutes in Moscow	MPC · 5717
5718 Roykerr	1983 PB	Roy Patrick Kerr (born 1934) is a New Zealand mathematician. He was awarded the 2016 Crafoord Prize, as well as many other awards, for his 1963 discovery of the solution of Einstein's equation which exactly describes a rotating black hole.	IAU · 5718
5719 Křižík	1983 RX	František Křižík (1847–1941), a Czech inventor	MPC · 5719
5720 Halweaver	1984 FN	Harold Anthony Weaver (born 1953), an American astronomer †	MPC · 5720
5722 Johnscherrer	1986 JS	John Randell Scherrer (born 1960), American project manager and deputy payload manager on NASA's New Horizons Pluto Kuiper Belt mission	JPL · 5722
5723 Hudson	1986 RR_{2}	Scott Hudson (born 1959), an American electrical engineer and radar astronomer	MPC · 5723
5725 Nördlingen	1988 BK_{2}	Nördlingen, a medieval town in southern Germany	MPC · 5725
5726 Rubin	1988 BN_{2}	Vera Rubin (1928–2016), an American astronomer best known for her research on galaxy rotation rates	MPC · 5726
5727 Pierobenvenuti	1988 BB_{4}	Piero Benvenuti, an Italian astronomer.	IAU · 5727
5728 Umbertobenvenuti	1988 BJ_{4}	Named in memory of Umberto Benvenuti (1989–2005), son of Beatrice and Piero Benvenuti. Umberto loved to explore the galaxy with his brother and best friend Eugenio in their imaginary spacecraft. He gave his family the power to face any difficulty, and helped them appreciate that we are all part of the same universe.	IAU · 5728
5730 Yonosuke	1988 TP_{1}	Yonosuke Nakano (1887–1974), a Japanese astronomer, educator, and co-founder of the Gekko Observatory	JPL · 5730
5731 Zeus	1988 VP_{4}	Zeus, Greek god	MPC · 5731
5734 Noguchi	1989 AL_{1}	Soichi Noguchi (born 1965), a Japanese astronaut	MPC · 5734
5735 Loripaul	1989 LM	Lori L. Paul, environmentalist and assistant director of Telescopes in Education (TIE) at the Mount Wilson Institute and JPL	MPC · 5735
5736 Sanford	1989 LW	John Sanford, former president of the Orange County Astronomers and recipient of the Bruce Blair Award	MPC · 5736
5737 Itoh	1989 SK	Kazuyuki Itoh, Japanese amateur astronomer.	JPL · 5737
5738 Billpickering	1989 UY_{3}	Bill Pickering (1910–2004), former director of the Jet Propulsion Laboratory	MPC · 5738
5739 Robertburns	1989 WK_{2}	Robert Burns (1759–1796), a Scottish poet and lyricist.	JPL · 5739
5740 Toutoumi	1989 WM_{3}	Tōtōmi Province, ancient name of western part of Shizuoka Prefecture, Japan.	JPL · 5740
5741 Akanemaruta	1989 XC	Akane Maruta (1988–1998), a Japanese girl after whom the Akane Astronomical Observatory is also named	JPL · 5741
5743 Kato	1990 UW	Yasuo Katō (1949–1982), a Japanese mountain climber	MPC · 5743
5744 Yorimasa	1990 XP	Minamoto no Yorimasa, early samurai	MPC · 5744
5747 Williamina	1991 CO_{3}	Williamina Fleming (1857–1911), a Scottish-American astronomer at Harvard College Observatory, instrumental for the creation of a stellar designation system and classifying most stars listed in the Henry Draper Catalogue. She also discovered hundreds of variable stars and dozens of nebulae, such as the Horsehead Nebula in 1888.	IAU · 5747
5748 Davebrin	1991 DX	Glen David Brin (born 1950), American astrophysicist and science fiction writer	MPC · 5748
5749 Urduja	1991 FV	Urduja, legendary warrior princess from the Philippines	MPC · 5749
5750 Kandatai	1991 GG_{1}	Tai Kanda (born 1938), Japanese astronomer and staff member of the National Astronomical Observatory of Japan	MPC · 5750
5751 Zao	1992 AC	Mount Zaō, Tōhoku region, Japan	MPC · 5751
5753 Yoshidatadahiko	1992 EM	Tadahiko Yoshida, vice president of AES (Advanced Engineering Services), Japanese aerospace company	MPC · 5753
5756 Wassenbergh	6034 P-L	Henri Wassenbergh (1924–2014), was a Dutch Professor of Air and Space Law at Leiden University and founder of the International Institute of Air and Space Law at Leiden	MPC · 5756
5757 Tichá	1967 JN	Jana Tichá (born 1965), a Czech astronomer, director of the Kleť Observatory, and discoverer of minor planets	MPC · 5757
5758 Brunini	1976 QZ_{1}	Adrián Brunini (born 1959), Argentine astronomer. He is the head of the celestial mechanics group at La Plata Observatory and known for his research on the formation and evolution of the Solar System.	JPL · 5758
5759 Zoshchenko	1980 BJ_{4}	Mikhail Zoshchenko, Russian satirist	MPC · 5759
5760 Mittlefehldt	1981 EX_{13}	David Wayne Mittlefehldt (born 1951), an American astronomer and geochemist Src	MPC · 5760
5761 Andreivanov	1981 ED_{21}	Andrei V. Ivanov (born 1937), a Russian cosmochemist and meteoriticist	MPC · 5761
5762 Wänke	1981 EG_{28}	Heinrich Wänke (1928–2015), an Austrian cosmochemist and meteoriticist at Max Planck Society	MPC · 5762
5763 Williamtobin	1982 MA	William John Tobin (1953–2022), the English-born former director of Mt. John Observatory	IAU · 5763
5765 Izett	1986 GU	Glen A. Izett, an American geologist	MPC · 5765
5766 Carmelofalco	1986 QR_{3}	Carmelo Falco (born 1978) is an enthusiastic amateur astronomer with great scientific and technological skills. He is president of the Ettore Majorana amateur astronomers association and scientific director of the Lematre Observatory in Racalmuto (Sicily).	IAU · 5766
5767 Moldun	1986 RV_{2}	Meudon (Moldun in old Gaelic), suburb of Paris, France, and location of the Astrophysics Section of the Paris Observatory	MPC · 5767
5768 Pittich	1986 TN_{1}	Eduard M. Pittich (born 1940), a Slovak astronomer	MPC · 5768
5769 Michard	1987 PL	Raymond Michard (born 1925), administrator of the Côte d'Azur Observatory in France	MPC · 5769
5770 Aricam	1987 RY	Arianna Laurenti (born 2017) and Camilla Laurenti (born 2017), twin granddaughters of Italian astronomer Mario Di Martino at the Turin Observatory, who was a friend of the discoverer Henri Debehogne (1928–2007).	IAU · 5770
5771 Somerville	1987 ST_{1}	Mary Somerville (1780–1872), British mathematician and scientific author	MPC · 5771
5772 Johnlambert	1988 LB	John V. Lambert (born 1945) has developed techniques for determining the sizes and shapes of minor planets from occultation and lightcurve observations. He is now involved in the U.S. Air Force Space Command and the Phillips Laboratory programs for the study of near-earth objects.	JPL · 5772
5773 Hopper	1989 NO	Grace Hopper (December 9, 1906 – January 1, 1992) an American computer scientist and United States Navy rear admiral	JPL · 5773
5774 Ratliff	1989 NR	Nicholas Paul Ratliff (1982–2002), of Oklahoma City who died at the age of 20. He was a keen baseball player and interested in astronomy, ever since he was given a telescope at the age of five.	JPL · 5774
5775 Inuyama	1989 SP	Inuyama, a city in the northern part of Aichi Prefecture.	JPL · 5775
5777 Hanaki	1989 XF	Many years ago, Yoichi Hanaki (born 1937) used to make astronomical observations, notably of Jupiter, with the second discoverer. Later he established the vocational training facility Hoshi-no-mura that endeavors to help mentally handicapped people.	JPL · 5777
5778 Jurafrance	1989 YF_{5}	The French Jura, a department in eastern France.	JPL · 5778
5779 Schupmann	1990 BC_{1}	Ludwig Schupmann, German 19th–20th-century optician, who described in Die Medial-Fernrohre a reflecting-refracting telescope with Mangin mirrors that eliminates chromatic aberrations while using common optical glasses	JPL · 5779
5780 Lafontaine	1990 EJ_{2}	Jean de la Fontaine, French poet	MPC · 5780
5781 Barkhatova	1990 SM_{28}	Klavdiia Aleksandrovna Barkhatova (Claudia Barkhatova; 1917–1990), a Russian astronomer and founder of the Kourovka Observatory	MPC · 5781
5782 Akirafujiwara	1991 AF	Akira Fujiwara, Japanese project scientist for the Hayabusa mission to the near-Earth object 25143 Itokawa	JPL · 5782
5783 Kumagaya	1991 CO	Kumagaya, Saitama, Japan	MPC · 5783
5784 Yoron	1991 CY	Yoronjima (Yoron island), north of Okinawa prefecture, Japan	MPC · 5784
5785 Fulton	1991 FU	Joseph A. Fulton, hardware engineer and involved in the Palomar Planet-Crossing Asteroid Survey	MPC · 5785
5786 Talos	1991 RC	Talos, from Greek mythology, was the nephew of Daedalus, who tried to murder him because he was jealous of his inventiveness	MPC · 5786
5789 Sellin	4018 P-L	Ivan A. Sellin (born 1939), professor at Oak Ridge National Laboratory and at the University of Tennessee in Knoxville	MPC · 5789
5790 Nagasaki	9540 P-L	Nagasaki, Japan	MPC · 5790
5791 Comello	4053 T-2	Georg Comello (born 1942), Dutch amateur astronomer	MPC · 5791
5792 Unstrut	1964 BF	The Unstrut, a river in eastern Germany	MPC · 5792
5793 Ringuelet	1975 TK_{6}	Adela Ringuelet (1930–2023), Argentine astronomer, co-founder of the Argentine Astronomical Association (Asociación Argentina de Astronomía)	JPL · 5793
5794 Irmina	1976 SW_{3}	Mikhailovna Golodyaevskaya (1931–1956), a Russian student of the Moscow Conservatory	MPC · 5794
5795 Roshchina	1978 SH_{1}	Elena Olegovna Roshchina (1966–1994), a Russian journalist	MPC · 5795
5796 Klemm	1978 VK_{5}	Per Klemm (1949–2011), a Danish professor of microbiology.	JPL · 5796
5797 Bivoj	1980 AA	Bivoj, mythological Bohemian hero	MPC · 5797
5798 Burnett	1980 RL_{7}	Donald Burnett (born 1937), American cosmochemist, lead investigator for the Genesis mission	MPC · 5798
5799 Brewington	1980 TG_{4}	Howard J. Brewington (born 1952), American amateur astronomer and discoverer of comets	MPC · 5799
5800 Pollock	1982 UV_{1}	Jackson Pollock, American artist	MPC · 5800

== 5801–5900 ==
back to top

Named minor planet	Provisional	This minor planet was named for...	Ref · Catalog
5801 Vasarely	1984 BK	Victor Vasarely (1908–1997), a Hungarian painter, sculptor, and graphic artist.	JPL · 5801
5802 Casteldelpiano	1984 HL_{1}	Castel del Piano, an ancient castle near Carrara, Tuscany, Italy, that has been recently restored by two great lovers of astronomy and friends of the discoverer, Sabina Ruffaldi and Andrea Ghigliazza.	JPL · 5802
5803 Ötzi	1984 OA	Ötzi the Iceman, the mummified "iceman"	MPC · 5803
5804 Bambinidipraga	1985 RL_{1}	Bambini di Praga, a Czech children's choir	MPC · 5804
5805 Glasgow	1985 YH	Glasgow, UK and The Astronomical Society of Glasgow	MPC · 5805
5806 Archieroy	1986 AG_{1}	Archie Roy (Archibald Edmiston Roy), astronomer, Professor Emeritus of Astronomy in the University of Glasgow, Fellow of the Royal Society of Edinburgh, The Royal Astronomical Society	MPC · 5806
5807 Mshatka	1986 QA_{4}	Country estate of Nikolaj Yakovlevich Danilevskij, Russian thinker	MPC · 5807
5808 Babelʹ	1987 QV_{10}	Isaac Babelʹ (1894–1940), Russian writer and dramatist. Named on the commemoration of his 100th anniversary of his birth	MPC · 5808
5809 Kulibin	1987 RG_{6}	Ivan Petrovich Kulibin, Russian engineer	MPC · 5809
5811 Keck	1988 KC	Howard B. Keck, chairman and president emeritus of the W. M. Keck Foundation. Under Howard Keck's leadership, the Foundation provided the grants to build the giant twin telescopes of the W. M. Keck Observatory. This minor planet is being named on the occasion of the dedication of the second Keck Telescope on 1996 May 8.	MPC · 5811
5812 Jayewinkler	1988 PJ_{1}	Jaye Scott Winkler, a friend of American discoverer Andrew J. Noymer	MPC · 5812
5813 Eizaburo	1988 VL	Eizaburo Nishibori, Japanese scientist, alpinist and technologist.	JPL · 5813
5815 Shinsengumi	1989 AH	The Shinsengumi, Japanese group of samurai warriors	MPC · 5815
5816 Potsdam	1989 AO_{6}	Potsdam, largest city and capital of the German state of Brandenburg, where the Potsdam Observatory is located	MPC · 5816
5817 Robertfrazer	1989 RZ	Robert E. Frazer (born 1918), longtime friend and colleague of the discoverer.	JPL · 5817
5819 Lauretta	1989 UZ_{4}	Dante Lauretta, American cosmochemist and meteoriticist at the University of Arizona	MPC · 5819
5820 Babelsberg	1989 UF_{7}	Babelsberg, the largest district of the city of Potsdam in Germany, where the Babelsberg Observatory is located	MPC · 5820
5821 Yukiomaeda	1989 VV	Yukio Maeda (born 1948), well-known Japanese amateur astronomer and space engineer at the Institute of Space and Astronautical Science	MPC · 5821
5822 Masakichi	1989 WL	Masakichi Hioki (born 1929), father of Japanese co-discover Tsutomu Hioki	JPL · 5822
5823 Oryo	1989 YH	Narasaki Ryō (1842–1913), wife of Japanese samurai hero Sakamoto Ryōma	MPC · 5823
5824 Inagaki	1989 YM	Minoru Inagaki (born 1958), Japanese classical guitarist	MPC · 5824
5825 Rakuyou	1990 BR_{1}	Named for the Kyoto city Rakuyou technical high school, originally established in 1894 as Kyoto city dyeing and weaving school.	JPL · 5825
5826 Bradstreet	1990 DB	David Bradstreet (born 1954), Chair of the Astronomy Department at Eastern University (St. Davids, PA).	JPL · 5826
5827 Letunov	1990 VB_{15}	Yurij Aleksandrovich Letunov (1926–1984), a Russian journalist and radio commentator.	JPL · 5827
5829 Ishidagoro	1991 CT_{1}	Gorō Ishida (1924–1992), Japanese astronomer	MPC · 5829
5830 Simohiro	1991 EG	Hirofumi or Hiroshi Shimoda, Japanese amateur astronomer	JPL · 5830
5831 Dizzy	1991 JG	John Birks "Dizzy" Gillespie, American trumpeter, co-inventor of bebop	JPL · 5831
5832 Martaprincipe	1991 LE_{1}	Marta Carusi and Raffaele "Principe" Ranucci were married in Nov. 2000. The name was suggested by A. Carusi.	JPL · 5832
5833 Peterson	1991 PQ	Colin A. Peterson (born 1977), a research support specialist at Cornell University.	JPL · 5833
5834 Kasai	1992 SZ_{14}	Kiyoshi Kasai (born 1947) was principal flutist with the Symphony Orchestra Basel (Switzerland). He is also an amateur astronomer and has discovered more than 80 new variable stars.	IAU · 5834
5835 Mainfranken	1992 SP_{24}	Lower Franconia, district of Franconia in northern Bavaria, Germany. It is often called "Mainfranken" as the Main River runs through it.	MPC · 5835
5837 Hedin	2548 P-L	Sven Anders Hedin (1865–1952), Swedish geographer and explorer	MPC · 5837
5838 Hamsun	2170 T-2	Knut Hamsun (1859–1952), Norwegian author, winner of the 1920 Nobel Prize for literature	MPC · 5838
5839 GOI	1974 SJ_{3}	The Vavilov State Optical Institute (formerly "Gosudarstvennyj Opticheskij Institut" or GOI), founded in 1918 on the initiative of its first director and physicist-optician Dmitrij Sergeevich Rozhdestvenskij (1876–1940) † Archived 2009-02-17 at the Wayback Machine	JPL · 5839
5840 Raybrown	1978 ON	Raymond Matthews ("Ray") Brown, American jazz bassist, who played in Dizzy Gillespie's band and later with the Oscar Peterson Trio, husband and musical director of Ella Fitzgerald	JPL · 5840
5841 Stone	1982 ST	Professor Ed Stone, former Director of the Jet Propulsion Laboratory (1991–2001) and the project scientist for the Voyager Mission at the Jet Propulsion Laboratory since 1972.	MPC · 5841
5842 Cancelli	1986 CV_{1}	Ferdinando Cancelli (born 1969), a doctor whose speciality is palliative medicine. He is deeply involved in ethical issues concerning the end of life and in the care of terminally ill persons.	JPL · 5842
5844 Chlupáč	1986 UQ	Ivo Chlupáč (1931–2002), a Czech geologist, stratigrapher and paleontologist.	IAU · 5844
5845 Davidbrewster	1988 QP	David Brewster (1781–1868), a Scottish scientist, a populariser of science and a founder of the British Association for the Advancement of Science.	JPL · 5845
5846 Hessen	1989 AW_{6}	Hesse, a German federal state	MPC · 5846
5847 Wakiya	1989 YB	Nanayo Wakiya, member of Japan Planetarium Laboratory	MPC · 5847
5848 Harutoriko	1990 BZ_{1}	Lake Harutori, Hokkaidō, Japan	MPC · 5848
5849 Bhanji	1990 HF_{1}	Alaudin Bhanji (born 1951) is a JPL engineer and Project Manager for NASA's Deep Space Network (DSN). He has ensured that the DSN's capabilities continue to enable communications with spacecraft throughout the solar system as well as providing radar characterizations of solar system bodies, including numerous asteroids.	JPL · 5849
5850 Masaharu	1990 XM	Masaharu Suzuki, member of Goto Optical Mfg. Co.	MPC · 5850
5851 Inagawa	1991 DM_{1}	Inagawa, a Japanese town in the Hyōgo Prefecture	MPC · 5851
5852 Nanette	1991 HO	Nanette and Mark Vigil, daughter and son-in-law of Canadian co-discoverer David H. Levy	MPC · 5852
5855 Yukitsuna	1992 UO_{2}	Minamoto no Yukitsuna, Japanese general in the late Heian period, who occupied the provinces of Settsu and Kawachi	MPC · 5855
5856 Peluk	1994 AL_{2}	Peter-Lukas Graf (born 1929), a Swiss musician, flutist and conductor, mainly distinguished as soloist, teacher and author.	IAU · 5856
5857 Neglinka	1975 TM_{2}	The Neglinnaya River ("Neglinka"), a tributary of the Moskva River in Moscow, Russia	MPC · 5857
5858 Borovitskia	1978 SU_{5}	Kremlin Hill (formerly "Borovitsky Hill"), one of the seven hills of Moscow, where the first buildings of the ancient settlement were erected, and now the location of the Red Square	MPC · 5858
5859 Ostozhenka	1979 FD_{2}	Ostozhenka Street in the Khamovniki District of the Russian city of Moscow, built on a former hayfield and now part of The Golden Mile	MPC · 5859
5860 Deankoontz	1981 QE_{1}	Dean Ray Koontz (born 1945) is a contemporary American author.	JPL · 5860
5861 Glynjones	1982 RW	Kenneth Glyn Jones (1915–1995), British astronomer and historian	MPC · 5861
5862 Sakanoue	1983 AB	Tsutomu Sakanoue (born 1921), Japanese meteorologist and amateur astronomer	MPC · 5862
5863 Tara	1983 RB	Tara, goddess in Hinduism	MPC · 5863
5864 Montgolfier	1983 RC_{4}	The Montgolfier brothers, French aeronauts	MPC · 5864
5865 Qualytemocrina	1984 QQ	The International Comet Quarterly, an astronomical journal and international archive of photometric data on comets	MPC · 5865
5866 Sachsen	1988 PM_{2}	Saxony (German: Sachsen), a state in Germany	MPC · 5866
5868 Ohta	1988 TQ	Kentarō Ohta, member of Goto Optical Mfg. Co.	MPC · 5868
5869 Tanith	1988 VN_{4}	Tanit, chief deity of Carthage	MPC · 5869
5870 Baltimore	1989 CC_{1}	Baltimore, Maryland, USA	MPC · 5870
5871 Bobbell	1989 CE_{2}	Robert L. Bell, friend and associate of the discoverer's husband.	JPL · 5871
5872 Sugano	1989 SL	Matsuo Sugano (born 1939), the first discoverer of comet C/1983 J1	JPL · 5872
5873 Archilochos	1989 SB_{3}	Archilochos, Ancient Greek poet	MPC · 5873
5875 Kuga	1989 XO	Naoto or Naohito (or Tadahito) Kuga, member of Goto Optical Mfg. Co.	MPC · 5875
5877 Toshimaihara	1990 FP	Toshinori Maihara (born 1942), a professor at Kyoto University and leading infrared astronomer in Japan	MPC · 5877
5878 Charlene	1991 CC_{1}	Charlene Marie Anderson, associate director of the Planetary Society	MPC · 5878
5879 Almeria	1992 CH_{1}	Almeria, the Spanish city and province where the Calar Alto Observatory of the German–Spanish Astronomical Centre is located	JPL · 5879
5881 Akashi	1992 SR_{12}	Akashi, Hyōgo, a city facing the Setouchi Inland Sea, Japan.	JPL · 5881
5883 Josephblack	1993 VM_{5}	Joseph Black (1728–1799), a Scottish scientist.	JPL · 5883
5884 Dolezal	6045 P-L	Erich Dolezal (1902–1990), Austrian writer and popularizer of astronomy and space science, co-founder of the "Austrian Society for Space Research"	MPC · 5884
5885 Apeldoorn	3137 T-2	Ben Apeldoorn (born 1944), Dutch amateur astronomer and science publicist, on the occasion of his 50th birthday	MPC · 5885
5886 Rutger	1975 LR	Lyle Lee Rutger (born 1949), American leader of the Nuclear Launch Approval office of the Department of Energy for NASA's New Horizons Pluto-Kuiper Belt mission	JPL · 5886
5887 Yauza	1976 SG_{2}	The Yauza River, a tributary of the Moskva River in Moscow	MPC · 5887
5888 Ruders	1978 VU_{7}	Poul Ruders (born 1949), Danish composer	JPL · 5888
5889 Mickiewicz	1979 FA_{3}	Adam Mickiewicz, poet and playwright	MPC · 5889
5890 Carlsberg	1979 KG	The Carlsberg Foundation, established by philanthropist J. C. Jacobsen in 1876, who was also the founder of the first Carlsberg Brewery	MPC · 5890
5891 Gehrig	1981 SM	Lou Gehrig, American baseball player	MPC · 5891
5892 Milesdavis	1981 YS_{1}	Miles Dewey Davis III, American jazz trumpeter, bandleader and composer	JPL · 5892
5893 Coltrane	1982 EF	John William Coltrane, American jazz saxophonist and composer	JPL · 5893
5894 Telč	1982 RM_{1}	Telč, Czech Republic	MPC · 5894
5895 Žbirka	1982 UF_{2}	Miroslav Žbirka (1952–2021), Slovak singer and songwriter. Before going solo, he played in the bands Modus and Limit. His songs in Slovak, Czech and English have greatly enriched the Czech and Slovak pop music scene. He was a lifelong fan of the Beatles. The name was suggested by S. Kürti.	JPL · 5895
5896 Narrenschiff	1982 VV_{10}	Named on the occasion of the quincentenary of the publication of the Narrenschiff, immortal satiric poem by Sebastian Brant, German writer and humanist	MPC · 5896
5897 Novotná	1984 SZ_{1}	Jarmila Novotná-Daubková (1907–1994), Czech opera singer	MPC · 5897
5899 Jedicke	1986 AH	The Jedicke family: Peter Jedicke (born 1955), Robert Jedicke (born 1963), and June Jedicke-Zehr (born 1966), Canadian astronomers Src	MPC · 5899
5900 Jensen	1986 TL	Poul Jensen, Danish astronomer and a discoverer of minor planets. He served in the Meridian Circle Department at the Brorfelde Observatory for 35 years, and his wife, Bodil Jensen. Jensen has also taken part in the minor planet program carried out with the Schmidt telescope. This minor planet's name wasproposed by K. Augustesen and H. J. Fogh Olsen.	MPC · 5900

== 5901–6000 ==
back to top

Named minor planet	Provisional	This minor planet was named for...	Ref · Catalog
5902 Talima	1987 QY_{10}	Tatiana Alimovna Damir, friend of the discoverer, daughter of Alim Matveevich Damir (5717) and wife of Sergej Petrovich Kapitsa (5094)	MPC · 5902
5904 Württemberg	1989 AE_{7}	Württemberg, Germany	MPC · 5904
5905 Johnson	1989 CJ_{1}	Lindley N. Johnson, American astronomer and instrumental for the NEAT program	MPC · 5905
5907 Rhigmus	1989 TU_{5}	Rhigmus, son of Peires from Thracea and a Trojan warrior in Greek mythology. Rhigmus was speared by Achilles while riding in his chariot.	IAU · 5907
5908 Aichi	1989 UF	Aichi Prefecture, Japan.	JPL · 5908
5909 Nagoya	1989 UT	Nagoya, Aichi, Japan.	JPL · 5909
5910 Zátopek	1989 WH_{4}	Emil Zátopek, Czech Olympic long-distance runner	MPC · 5910
5912 Oyatoshiyuki	1989 YR	Toshiyuki Oya, Japanese amateur astronomer	JPL · 5912
5914 Kathywhaler	1990 WK	Kathryn Anne Whaler (born 1956), Scottish professor of geophysics, Royal Astronomical Society president 2004–2006	JPL · 5914
5915 Yoshihiro	1991 EU	Yoshihiro Yamada (born 1946), Japanese astronomy educator	MPC · 5915
5916 van der Woude	1991 JD_{1}	Jurrie van der Woude, Dutch-born former Public Affairs Officer and Image Coordinator at the Jet Propulsion Laboratory	MPC · 5916
5917 Chibasai	1991 NG	The Chiba Science Association, a non-profit astronomy organization in Chiba, Japan	MPC · 5917
5919 Patrickmartin	1991 PW_{12}	Patrick Martin (born 1967), a research associate at Cornell University.	JPL · 5919
5920 Davidbell	1992 SX_{17}	David Bell, American astronomer	IAU · 5920
5922 Shouichi	1992 UV	Shouichi Satō, Japanese electric engineer.	MPC · 5922
5923 Liedeke	1992 WC_{8}	Liedeke Gehrels-de Stoppelaar, wife of astronomer Tom Gehrels †	MPC · 5923
5924 Teruo	1994 CH_{1}	Teruo Saegusa, Japanese mountain climber	MPC · 5924
5926 Schönfeld	1929 PB	Eduard Schönfeld (1828–1891), a German astronomer and director at the Mannheim and Bonn observatories who participated in the Bonner Durchmusterung	MPC · 5926
5927 Krogh	1938 HA	Fred T. Krogh (born 1937), an American mathematician.	JPL · 5927
5928 Pindarus	1973 SK_{1}	Pindar (c. 518–438 BC), Greek lyric poet	MPC · 5928
5929 Manzano	1974 XT	José Roberto Manzano (1928–1999), Argentine astronomer and physicist	JPL · 5929
5930 Zhiganov	1975 VW_{2}	Näcip Cihanov (Nazib Gayazovich Zhiganov; 1911–1988), a Soviet Tartar composer and founder of the Tatarian professional musical school	MPC · 5930
5931 Zhvanetskij	1976 GK_{3}	Mikhail Zhvanetsky (1934–2020), Russian writer, satirist and performer	MPC · 5931
5932 Prutkov	1976 GO_{3}	Kozma Prutkov, a fictional author and the collective pen-name of several satirical Russian poets during the Russian Empire in the 1850s and 1860s	MPC · 5932
5933 Kemurdzhian	1976 QN	Alexander Kemurdzhian (1921–2003), Soviet designer of Lunokhod moon rover	MPC · 5933
5934 Mats	1976 SJ	Mats Lindgren, Swedish astronomer at Uppsala Astronomical Observatory	MPC · 5934
5935 Ostankino	1977 EF_{1}	Ostankino, district of the city of Moscow in Russia	MPC · 5935
5936 Khadzhinov	1979 FQ_{2}	Leonid Petrovich Khadzhinov (born 1927), a Ukrainian electrical engineer	MPC · 5936
5937 Lodén	1979 XQ	Kerstin Lodén and Lars Olof Lodén, Swedish astronomers at Stockholm Observatory	MPC · 5937
5938 Keller	1980 FH_{2}	Horst Uwe Keller, German physicist at the Max Planck Institute in Lindau	MPC · 5938
5939 Toshimayeda	1981 EU_{8}	Toshiko Mayeda, Japanese meteoriticist	MPC · 5939
5940 Feliksobolev	1981 TJ_{4}	Feliks Mikhailovich Sobolev (1931–1984), Ukrainian film producer	MPC · 5940
5941 Valencia	1982 UQ_{6}	Valencia, Spain	MPC · 5941
5942 Denzilrobert	1983 AN_{2}	Denzil Marley (born 1918) and Robert Behymer (born 1926), fathers of the discoverers.	JPL · 5942
5943 Lovi	1984 EG	George Lovi (1939–1993), Hungarian-born astronomical writer and cartographer	MPC · 5943
5944 Utesov	1984 JA_{2}	Leonid Utyosov, Russian singer, musician, actor, founder and artistic leader of the first Russian theatricalized jazz band (on the occasion of the one-hundredth anniversary his birth)	MPC · 5944
5945 Roachapproach	1984 SQ_{3}	Steve Roach (born 1955), American musician and composer of 'space music' Src	MPC · 5945
5946 Hrozný	1984 UC_{1}	Bedřich Hrozný, Czech archeologist, orientalist and linguist, decipherer of Hittite	MPC · 5946
5947 Bonnie	1985 FD	Bonnie Gail Farquhar (1936–1993), late wife of American engineer Robert W. Farquhar, a spaceflight mission director at NASA	MPC · 5947
5948 Longo	1985 JL	Giuseppe Longo (born 1920), Italian astronomer and physicist at the University of Bologna	MPC · 5948
5950 Leukippos	1986 PS_{4}	Leucippus, Ancient Greek philosopher	MPC · 5950
5951 Alicemonet	1986 TZ_{1}	Alice Kay Monet (Alice Kay Babcock; born 1954), American astronomer at the United States Naval Observatory Flagstaff Station. She is married to David Monet (see below)	MPC · 5951
5952 Davemonet	1987 EV	David Gilbert Monet (born 1951), American astronomer at the United States Naval Observatory Flagstaff Station and husband of Alice Monet (see above)	MPC · 5952
5953 Shelton	1987 HS	Ian Shelton (born 1957), Canadian astronomer known for the discovery of the bright supernova SN 1987A	JPL · 5953
5954 Epikouros	1987 QS_{1}	Epicurus, Ancient Greek philosopher	MPC · 5954
5955 Khromchenko	1987 RT_{3}	Vladimir Anatolievich Khromchenko, a music teacher at Yalta and a talented designer who constructed the first home-built organ in Ukraine.	JPL · 5955
5956 d'Alembert	1988 CF_{5}	Jean Le Rond d'Alembert, French philosopher and mathematician	MPC · 5956
5957 Irina	1988 JN	Victorovna Farquhar, wife of American engineer Robert W. Farquhar, a spaceflight mission director at NASA	MPC · 5957
5958 Barrande	1989 BS_{1}	Joachim Barrande, French palaeontologist	MPC · 5958
5959 Shaklan	1989 NB_{1}	Stuart B. Shaklan, an optical engineer and instrumental for the NEAT program	MPC · 5959
5960 Wakkanai	1989 US	Wakkanai, Hokkaidō, Japan	MPC · 5960
5961 Watt	1989 YH_{1}	James Watt (1736–1819), a Scottish engineer whose improvements to the steam engine led to the rapid advances of the industrial revolution.	JPL · 5961
5962 Shikokutenkyo	1990 HK	Shikoku Ten-mon Kyōkai, Japanese name for the Astronomical Society of Shikoku Island	MPC · 5962
5963 Terryalfriend	1990 QP_{2}	Kyle "Terry" Alfriend (born 1940), professor in the Department of Aerospace Engineering at Texas A&M University	MPC · 5963
5964 Johnjunkins	1990 QN_{4}	John L. Junkins (born 1943), professor of aerospace engineering at Texas A&M University	MPC · 5964
5965 Meisel	1990 SV_{15}	David Dering Meisel, American astronomer.	IAU · 5965
5966 Tomeko	1990 VS_{6}	Tomeko Goto (1899–?), wife of Seizo Goto, Japanese former president of Goto Optical Laboratory (see #969)	MPC · 5966
5967 Edithlevy	1991 CM_{5}	Edith Pailet Levy (born 1918), American-Canadian geneticist, and mother of astronomer David H. Levy	MPC · 5967
5968 Trauger	1991 FC	John T. Trauger, American physicist, Senior Research Scientist at the Jet Propulsion Laboratory, who was the principal investigator for the Wide Field/Planetary Camera II on the Hubble Space Telescope	MPC · 5968
5969 Ryuichiro	1991 FT	Ryuichiro Goto (born 1938), Japanese current president of Goto Optical Laboratory	MPC · 5969
5970 Ohdohrikouen	1991 JS_{1}	Odori Park, Sapporo, Japan	MPC · 5970
5971 Tickell	1991 NT_{2}	Crispin Tickell (born 1930), British diplomat, who chaired the board of the Climate Institute of Washington (1990–2002) and the Government Panel on Sustainable Development (1994–2000), and who also served on the UK government's Task Force on Near-Earth Objects	JPL · 5971
5972 Harryatkinson	1991 PS_{12}	Harry Atkinson (1929–2018), New Zealand-born British physicist, head of astronomy and space for the Science Research Council (1972–1978), chair of the European Space Agency Council (1984–1987), and chair of the UK Task Force on Near-Earth Objects in 2000	JPL · 5972
5973 Takimoto	1991 QC	Daisuke Takimoto, Japanese activist in the nuclear-power phase-out movement.	JPL · 5973
5975 Otakemayumi	1992 SG	Mayumi Ōtake, music composer of Japanese planetarium	MPC · 5975
5976 Kalatajean	1992 SR_{2}	Jean Marie Kalata, an American social science analyst at the Smithsonian Institution. Named on the occasion of the institution's sesquicentennial.	MPC · 5976
5978 Kaminokuni	1992 WT	Kaminokuni, Hokkaidō, Japan	MPC · 5978
5981 Kresilas	2140 P-L	Kresilas, Ancient Greek sculptor	MPC · 5981
5982 Polykletus	4862 T-1	Polykleitos (c. 480–423 BC), ancient Greek sculptor in bronze	MPC · 5982
5983 Praxiteles	2285 T-2	Praxiteles, Ancient Greek sculptor	MPC · 5983
5984 Lysippus	4045 T-3	Lysippos, Ancient Greek sculptor	MPC · 5984
5986 Xenophon	1969 TA	Xenophon, the Athenian nobleman, pupil and interpreter of Socrates, historian, agriculturist, and military officer who lived from about 440 to 354 B.C.	JPL · 5986
5987 Liviogratton	1975 LQ	Livio Gratton (1910–1991), Italo-Argentine astrophysicist, director of Astronomical Observatory of Córdoba and the first director of the Institute of Mathematics, Astronomy and Physics of the Córdoba National University	JPL · 5987
5988 Gorodnitskij	1976 GN_{2}	Aleksandr Moiseevich Gorodnitskij (born 1933), Soviet geophysicist, oceanologist, and mineralogist, poet and songwriter	MPC · 5988
5989 Sorin	1976 QC_{1}	Sergej Ivanovich Sorin (1916–1995), Soviet astronomer	MPC · 5989
5990 Panticapaeon	1977 EO	Panticapæon or Panticapaeum, ancient Greek colony, now Kerch, Ukrainian seaport at the eastern extremity of the Crimean Peninsula	MPC · 5990
5991 Ivavladis	1979 HE_{3}	Vladislav Ivanov (born 1936), Russian engineer	MPC · 5991
5992 Nittler	1981 DZ	Larry Nittler (born 1969), American meteoriticist	MPC · 5992
5993 Tammydickinson	1981 EU_{22}	Tamara Dickinson (born 1959), American meteoriticist	MPC · 5993
5994 Yakubovich	1981 SZ_{7}	Leonid Yakubovich (born 1945), Russian writer and television host	MPC · 5994
5995 Saint-Aignan	1982 DK	Charles P. de Saint-Aignan (born 1977), American astronomer and software engineer who has discovered several minor planets	MPC · 5995
5996 Julioángel	1983 NR	Julio Ángel Fernández (born 1946), Uruguayan astronomer	MPC · 5996
5997 Dirac	1983 TH	Paul Dirac (1902–1984), British physicist and Nobelist	MPC · 5997
5998 Sitenský	1986 RK_{1}	Ladislav Sitenský (1919–2009), Czech landscape photographer	MPC · 5998
5999 Plescia	1987 HA	Jeffrey B. Plescia, American geophysicist and planetary geologist, researcher of terrestrial impact craters at the Jet Propulsion Laboratory	MPC · 5999
6000 United Nations	1987 UN	The United Nations. The asteroid was named by vote of IAU Commission 20 at its 1994 meeting in The Hague on the recommendation of the Minor Planet Names Committee.	MPC · 6000

back to top

Preceded by 4,001–5,000	Meanings of minor-planet names List of minor planets: 5,001–6,000	Succeeded by 6,001–7,000
