= 5185 Alerossi =

Main-belt asteroid

Discovery
- Discovered by: H. E. Holt
- Discovery site: Palomar Obs.
- Discovery date: 15 September 1990

Designations
- Named after: Alessandro Rossi (Italian geodesist)
- Alternative designations: 1990 RV_{2} · 1933 SE; 1955 SM · 1981 RA_{1} 1984 HG · 1986 UR_{4} 1988 FQ_{3}
- Minor planet category: main-belt · (middle) background

Orbital characteristics
- Epoch 23 March 2018 (JD 2458200.5)
- Uncertainty parameter 0
- Observation arc: 84.34 yr (30,804 d)
- Aphelion: 2.8993 AU
- Perihelion: 2.4533 AU
- Semi-major axis: 2.6763 AU
- Eccentricity: 0.0833
- Orbital period (sidereal): 4.38 yr (1,599 d)
- Mean anomaly: 34.812°
- Mean motion: 0° 13^{m} 30.36^{s} / day
- Inclination: 8.3787°
- Longitude of ascending node: 216.42°
- Argument of perihelion: 216.46°

Physical characteristics
- Mean diameter: 12.86±1.2 km 13.36±0.12 km
- Geometric albedo: 0.081±0.009; 0.1408±0.031
- Absolute magnitude (H): 12.6

5185 Alerossi (provisional designation 1990 RV_{2}) is a background asteroid from the central region of the asteroid belt, approximately 13 miles (21 kilometers) in diameter. It was discovered on 15 September 1990, by American astronomer Henry Holt at Palomar Observatory in California, United States. The asteroid was later named for Italian geodesist Alessandro Rossi.

== Orbit and classification ==
Alerossi is a non-family asteroid from the main belt's background population. It orbits the Sun in the central asteroid belt at a distance of 2.5–2.9 AU once every 4 years and 5 months (1,599 days; semi-major axis of 2.68 AU). Its orbit has an eccentricity of 0.08 and an inclination of 8° with respect to the ecliptic.

In 1933, it was first observed as 1933 SE at Uccle Observatory, extending the body's observation arc by 57 years prior to its official discovery observation at Palomar.

== Naming ==
This minor planet was named after Italian geodesists Alessandro Rossi (born 1964), a member of the "Group of Satellite Flight Dynamics" at the Istituto CNECE in Pisa, Italy. Expert in space geodesy and participant in the Laser Geodynamics Satellites (LAGEOS) mission, he examines Earth's artificial orbital debris, the natural debris around mission targets to improve space-craft maneuvers, and the potential hazard of Earth-crossers. The official naming citation was published by the Minor Planet Center on 28 July 1999 (M.P.C. 61268).

== Physical characteristics ==
According to the surveys carried out by the Infrared Astronomical Satellite IRAS and NASA's Wide-field Infrared Survey Explorer with its subsequent NEOWISE mission, Alerossi measures 12.9 and 13.3 kilometers in diameter and its surface has an albedo of 0.08 and 0.14, respectively. It has an absolute magnitude of 12.6. As of 2018, the asteroid's spectral type, rotation period and shape remain unknown.
