= Miriam Baltuck =

American geologist (born 1954)

- Education: University of Michigan; Scripps Institution of Oceanography
- Scientific career
- Fields: Geology
- Institutions: National Aeronautics and Space Administration; Canberra Deep Space Communications Complex

Miriam Baltuck (born 1954) is an Australian American geologist. She was a program manager of the Solid Earth and Natural Hazards program at the National Aeronautics and Space Administration (NASA), Washington, DC. She later moved to Australia where she became director of the Canberra Deep Space Communications Complex (CDSCC), part of the Deep Space Network of NASA's Jet Propulsion Laboratory (JPL), located at Tidbinbilla in the Australian Capital Territory.

== Education ==
Baltuck obtained her B.S. degree from the University of Michigan and a Ph.D. degree from the Scripps Institution of Oceanography in 1982. Her graduate work included oceanographic research cruises, geologic field mapping, and laboratory geochemical analyses.

== Career ==
Baltuck began her career as an assistant professor of geology at Tulane University in New Orleans. In 1986 she moved to the National Aeronautics and Space Administration (NASA) where she managed the Solid Earth and Natural Hazards program in the Land Processes Branch of the Earth Science Division under Shelby Tilford. During this time she was the program scientist for the SIR-C and SRTM Space Shuttle missions, and represented NASA in Airborne Geophysics, Natural Hazards and Global Change research activities.

Baltuck was appointed to the White House Office of Science and Technology Policy in 1994, chairing a multi-agency National Earthquake Strategy Working Group. Later in 1997 she moved to Australia to take up a post as NASA representative at the US Embassy in Canberra, working to foster cooperation between NASA programs and space activities in Australia, Oceania, and Southeast Asia. She participated in the successful negotiation of the US-Australia Free Trade Agreement in 2004.

After a period in 2005 as Director of University Advancement at the Australian National University, Baltuck was appointed Director of the Canberra Deep Space Communications Complex (CDSCC) in 2006.

Baltuck participated in the Global Forest Observations Initiative, developed to foster satellite Earth observations for national forest monitoring systems in a multinational framework.

In 2005 a minor planet 5701 was designated Baltuck in her honor.

== Honors ==
- NASA Exceptional Achievement Medal, 1995
- NASA Office of Mission to Planet Earth Director's Award, 1996, 1997
- NASA Office of External Relations Director Awards, 1998–2003
- US Department of State Superior Honor Award, 2004
- The Australian National Emergency Medal 2021
