= Sainudeen Pattazhy =

Indian scientist

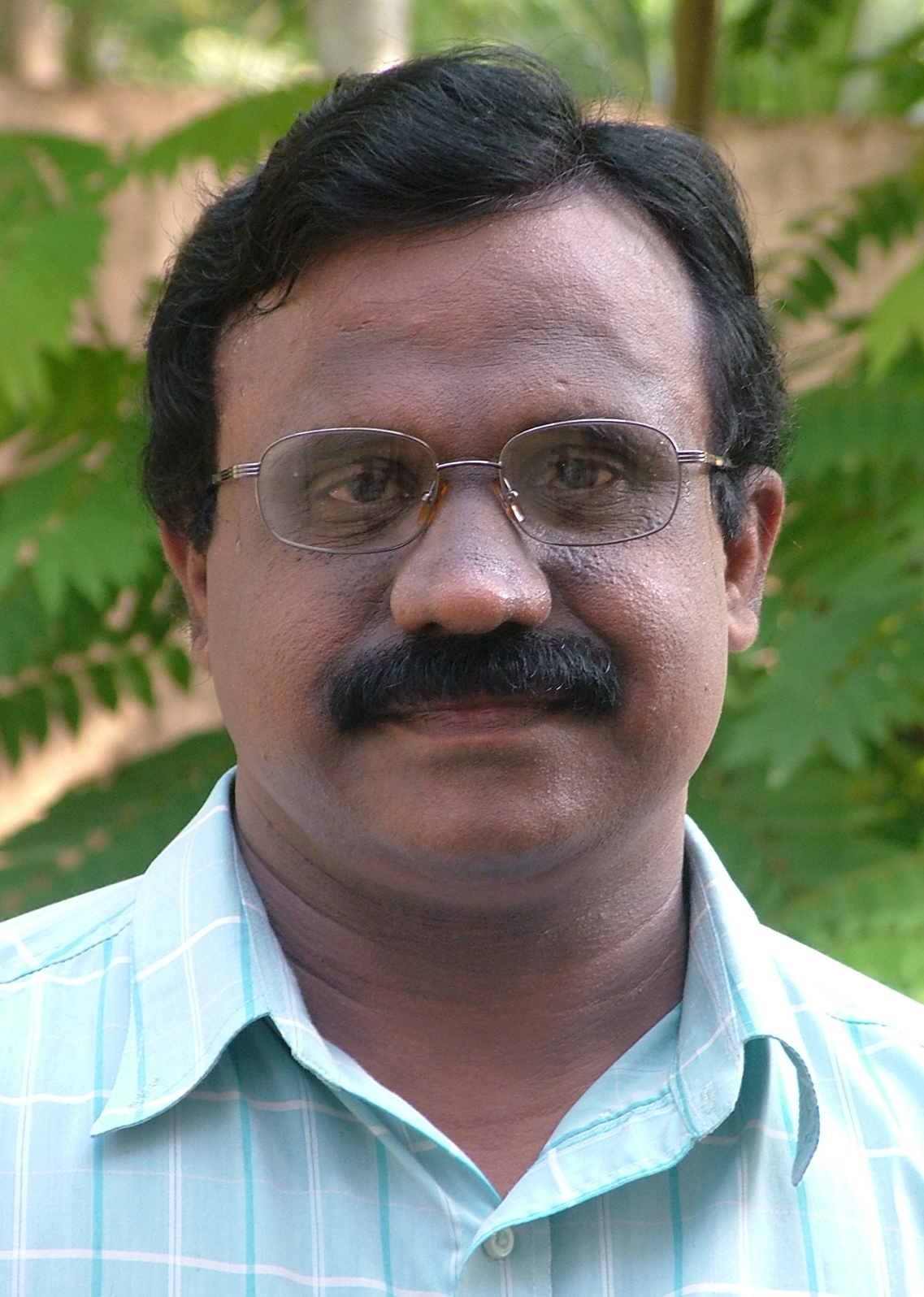
Sainudeen Pattazhy

Sainudeen Pattazhy is Associate professor zoology, now working at the University of Kerala, Karyavattom Campus, Thiruvananthapuram who comes from Kerala, India.

In 2008, the Committee for Small Bodies Nomenclature (CSBN) of the International Astronomical Union, an association of professional astronomers, named the minor planet 5178 Pattazhy – discovered by the California-based astronomer Rajgopalan Rajamohan in 1989 – in his honor.

== Career ==
Dr.Sainudeen Pattazhy has got a special interest in environmental issues. He heads the Kerala Environmental Researchers Association (KERA). He discovered the cause of red rain and studied the health hazards of mobile phone towers; and soft drinks like colo, pepsi etc.; eco-biology of sacred groves; and environmental effects of sand, rock, clay mining, plastic and pesticide pollution. He also invented a new biological method to control mosquitoes. His suggestions on health hazards are still pending with the Union Ministry of Environment, India. The telecommunication department in Kerala has constituted a committee to study health hazards and suggest measures in the light of his research works.

Sainudeen Pattazhy became popular for his study on the red rain phenomenon in Kerala in recent years, particularly 2001. His research proved that the red colour of the rains were due to a geological process and had nothing to do with alien life. "Regarding red rain, there was an argument that it was alien presence. But that’s just like science fiction. During 2001-02, peculiar geological situation was prevailing in Kerala like caving in of wells and landslides," he added.

He has got published 200 research papers in different national and international journals, including those in the US, UK and Australia. He has been honoured by several Indian, British and American awards for his contributions to environmental science.
