= 1232 Cortusa =

Background asteroid

Discovery
- Discovered by: K. Reinmuth
- Discovery site: Heidelberg Obs.
- Discovery date: 10 October 1931

Designations
- Pronunciation: /kɔːrˈtjuːsə/
- Named after: Cortusa (flowering plant)
- Alternative designations: 1931 TF_{2} · 1930 OH
- Minor planet category: main-belt · (outer) background

Orbital characteristics
- Epoch 27 April 2019 (JD 2458600.5)
- Uncertainty parameter 0
- Observation arc: 88.16 yr (32,200 d)
- Aphelion: 3.6109 AU
- Perihelion: 2.7535 AU
- Semi-major axis: 3.1822 AU
- Eccentricity: 0.1347
- Orbital period (sidereal): 5.68 yr (2,073 d)
- Mean anomaly: 279.34°
- Mean motion: 0° 10^{m} 24.96^{s} / day
- Inclination: 10.362°
- Longitude of ascending node: 261.21°
- Argument of perihelion: 340.44°

Physical characteristics
- Mean diameter: 33.13±2.3 km 36.367±0.463 km 36.60±9.07 km 39.17±11.98 km 42.015±0.259 km 42.20±1.11 km 43.27±0.82 km
- Synodic rotation period: 25.16±0.02 h
- Geometric albedo: 0.072; 0.0833; 0.085; 0.120; 0.1339; 0.14
- Spectral type: X (SDSS-MOC)
- Absolute magnitude (H): 10.20; 10.3; 10.35

1232 Cortusa, provisional designation 1931 TF_{2}, is a background asteroid from the outer regions of the asteroid belt, approximately 40 kilometers (25 miles) in diameter. It was discovered on 10 October 1931, by astronomer Karl Reinmuth at the Heidelberg Observatory in southwest Germany. The X-type asteroid has a rotation period of 25.2 hours. It was named after the plant Cortusa and indirectly honors astronomer Gustav Stracke.

== Orbit and classification ==
Cortusa is a non-family asteroid from the main belt's background population. It orbits the Sun in the outer main-belt at a distance of 2.8–3.6 AU once every 5 years and 8 months (2,073 days; semi-major axis of 3.18 AU). Its orbit has an eccentricity of 0.13 and an inclination of 10° with respect to the ecliptic. The body's observation arc begins with its first observation as 1930 OH at Johannesburg Observatory in July 1930, or 15 months prior to its official discovery observation at Heidelberg.

== Naming ==
This minor planet was named after the flowering plant Cortusa, a species of plant in the primrose family. The official naming citation was mentioned in The Names of the Minor Planets by Paul Herget in 1955 (H 114). It honors German astronomer and diligent orbit computer Gustav Stracke (1887–1943), who had asked that no asteroid be named after him. The initials of the asteroids 1227 through 1234, all discovered by Karl Reinmuth, spell out "G. Stracke". In this manner, Reinmuth was able to circumvent Stracke's desire and honor him nevertheless. The asteroid 1019 Strackea was later named after Stracke directly. In the 1990s, astronomer Brian Marsden was also honored by this method, see asteroids 5694 to 5699. The consecutive initial letters of these minor-planet names spell out "MarsdenB".

=== Reinmuth's flowers ===
Due to his many discoveries, Karl Reinmuth submitted a large list of 66 newly named asteroids in the early 1930s. The list covered his discoveries with numbers between (1009) and (1200). This list also contained a sequence of 28 asteroids, starting with 1054 Forsytia, that were all named after plants, in particular flowering plants (also see list of minor planets named after animals and plants).

== Physical characteristics ==
In the SDSS-based taxonomy, Cortusa is an X-type asteroid.

=== Rotation period ===
In August 2004, a rotational lightcurve of Cortusa was obtained from photometric observations by French amateur astronomer Pierre Antonini. Lightcurve analysis gave a rotation period of 25.16±0.02 hours with a brightness amplitude of 0.10 magnitude (U=2). Other period determinations were made by René Roy (<10 h) in December 2006 (U=1), and by the Spanish OBAS group (22.05 h) in June 2016 (U=2-).

=== Diameter and albedo ===
According to the surveys carried out by the Infrared Astronomical Satellite IRAS, the Japanese Akari satellite and the NEOWISE mission of NASA's Wide-field Infrared Survey Explorer, Cortusa measures between 33.13 and 43.27 kilometers in diameter and its surface has an albedo between 0.07 and 0.14. The Collaborative Asteroid Lightcurve Link derives an albedo of 0.1226 and a diameter of 33.05 kilometers based on an absolute magnitude of 10.3.
