= 1231 Auricula =

Carbonaceous background asteroid

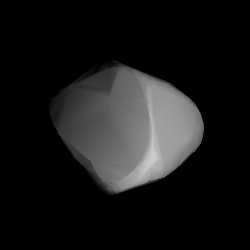
- Modelled shape of Auricula from its lightcurve

Discovery
- Discovered by: K. Reinmuth
- Discovery site: Heidelberg Obs.
- Discovery date: 10 October 1931

Designations
- Pronunciation: /ɔːˈrɪkjʊlə/
- Named after: Primula auricula (flowering plant)
- Alternative designations: 1931 TE_{2}
- Minor planet category: main-belt · (middle) background

Orbital characteristics
- Epoch 27 April 2019 (JD 2458600.5)
- Uncertainty parameter 0
- Observation arc: 87.02 yr (31,785 d)
- Aphelion: 2.8988 AU
- Perihelion: 2.4388 AU
- Semi-major axis: 2.6688 AU
- Eccentricity: 0.0862
- Orbital period (sidereal): 4.36 yr (1,593 d)
- Mean anomaly: 171.27°
- Mean motion: 0° 13^{m} 33.96^{s} / day
- Inclination: 11.483°
- Longitude of ascending node: 342.04°
- Argument of perihelion: 245.60°

Physical characteristics
- Mean diameter: 13.43±4.67 km 15.10±3.67 km 18.71±0.65 km 21.44±0.81 km 22.52±1.8 km
- Synodic rotation period: 3.9816±0.0006 h
- Geometric albedo: 0.066; 0.0798; 0.089; 0.11
- Spectral type: C (SDSS-MOC)
- Absolute magnitude (H): 11.60; 12.2; 12.29

1231 Auricula (prov. designation: 1931 TE_{2}) is a carbonaceous background asteroid from the central regions of the asteroid belt, approximately 20 kilometers (12 miles) in diameter. It was discovered on 10 October 1931, by German astronomer Karl Reinmuth at the Heidelberg Observatory. The likely elongated C-type asteroid has a rotation period of 3.98 hours. It was named after the flowering plant auricula and indirectly honors astronomer Gustav Stracke.

== Orbit and classification ==
Based on recent HCM-analyses, Auricula is a non-family asteroid that belongs to the main belt's background population. On its osculating Keplerian orbital elements, it is located in the Eunomia region (502), where the prominent family of stony asteroids is located.

It orbits the Sun in the central main-belt at a distance of 2.4–2.9 AU once every 4 years and 4 months (1,593 days; semi-major axis of 2.67 AU). Its orbit has an eccentricity of 0.09 and an inclination of 11° with respect to the ecliptic. The body's observation arc begins with its official discovery observation at Heidelberg in October 1931.

== Naming ==
This minor planet was named after the yellow flowered Alpine primrose, primula auricula. The official naming citation was mentioned in The Names of the Minor Planets by Paul Herget in 1955 (H 113). It honors German astronomer and diligent orbit computer Gustav Stracke (1887–1943), who had asked that no asteroid be named after him. The initials of the asteroids (1227) through (1234), all discovered by Karl Reinmuth, spell out "G. Stracke". In this manner, Reinmuth was able to circumvent Stracke's desire and honor him nevertheless. The asteroid 1019 Strackea was later named after Stracke directly. In the 1990s, astronomer Brian Marsden was also honored by this method, see asteroids 5694 to 5699. The consecutive initial letters of these minor-planet names spell out "MarsdenB".

=== Reinmuth's flowers ===
Due to his many discoveries, Karl Reinmuth submitted a large list of 66 newly named asteroids in the early 1930s. The list covered his discoveries with numbers between (1009) and (1200). This list also contained a sequence of 28 asteroids, starting with 1054 Forsytia, that were all named after plants, in particular flowering plants (also see list of minor planets named after animals and plants).

== Physical characteristics ==
In the SDSS-based taxonomy, Auricula is a common, carbonaceous C-type asteroid.

=== Rotation period and poles ===
In April 2008, a rotational lightcurve of Auricula was obtained from photometric observations by Colin Bembrick at the Mount Tarana Observatory (431) and other observers from Australia and New Zealand. Lightcurve analysis gave a rotation period of 3.9816±0.0006 hours with a brightness amplitude of 0.75 magnitude (U=3), indicative of a non-spherical, elongated shape. A modeled lightcurve using photometric data from the Lowell Photometric Database was published in 2016. It gave a concurring sidereal period of 3.981580±0.000001 hours, as well as two spin axes at (57.0°, −57.0°) and (225.0°, −85.0°) in ecliptic coordinates (λ, β).

=== Diameter and albedo ===
According to the surveys carried out by the Infrared Astronomical Satellite IRAS, the Japanese Akari satellite and the NEOWISE mission of NASA's Wide-field Infrared Survey Explorer, Auricula measures between 13.43 and 22.52 kilometers in diameter and its surface has an albedo between 0.066 and 0.11. The Collaborative Asteroid Lightcurve Link derives an albedo of 0.0465 and a diameter of 22.37 kilometers based on an absolute magnitude of 12.2.
