= Cortusa =

Former genus of flowering plants

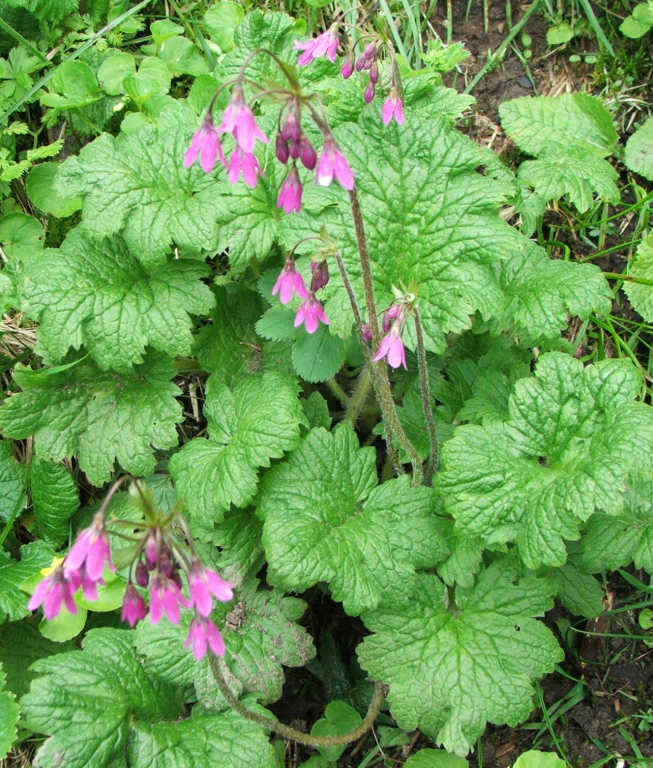
Primula matthioli, formerly Cortusa matthioli

Cortusa is a formerly recognized genus in the family Primulaceae. It is now regarded as a synonym of the genus Primula. It consisted of about 19 species of delicate, hardy, alpine perennials. The genus was named by the herbalist Matthiolus after his friend Cortusus, professor of botany at Padua, who discovered the plant originally called Cortusa matthioli (now Primula matthioli. The plants are flowering herbaceous perennials native to the mountains of southern and eastern Europe, including the Alps and the Carpathians, with some species native to China. Most of the species are small spring bloomers for shade and rock garden. These low-growing and rather handsome little plants have clumps of downy, light green, heart-shaped leaves with serrated edges. In late spring, small loose umbel of delicate bell-shaped to lily-liked flowers born terminally on drooping spikes arise from the base, some 6-8in high. Flowers are magenta, pink, white and yellow. They are dormant in some months, and as spring begins, stems and leaves quickly start to reproduce.

== Former species ==
- Cortusa altaica = Primula matthioli subsp. altaica
- Cortusa brotheri = Primula matthioli subsp. brotheri
- Cortusa caucasica = Primula algida
- Cortusa matthioli = Primula matthioli (alpine bells)
- Cortusa sachalinensis = Primula matthioli subsp. sachalinensis
- Cortusa turkestanica = Primula matthioli subsp. turkestanica
