= Elyna =

Elyna may refer to:

- Elyna, a taxonomic synonym of a genus of plants, Carex
- 1234 Elyna, an asteroid
