= 1233 Kobresia =

Carbonaceous background asteroid

Discovery
- Discovered by: K. Reinmuth
- Discovery site: Heidelberg Obs.
- Discovery date: 10 October 1931

Designations
- Pronunciation: /koʊˈbriːziə/
- Named after: Kobresia (flowering plant)
- Alternative designations: 1931 TG_{2} · 1927 TB; 1951 QJ · 1951 RP_{1} 1954 EG
- Minor planet category: main-belt · (inner) background

Orbital characteristics
- Epoch 4 September 2017 (JD 2458000.5)
- Uncertainty parameter 0
- Observation arc: 90.15 yr (32,928 days)
- Aphelion: 2.6976 AU
- Perihelion: 2.4143 AU
- Semi-major axis: 2.5560 AU
- Eccentricity: 0.0554
- Orbital period (sidereal): 4.09 yr (1,493 days)
- Mean anomaly: 117.22°
- Mean motion: 0° 14^{m} 28.32^{s} / day
- Inclination: 5.6024°
- Longitude of ascending node: 291.43°
- Argument of perihelion: 335.02°

Physical characteristics
- Dimensions: 29.73±7.16 km 30.239±10.28 km 31.46±15.67 km 33.323±0.159 km 33.45 km (derived); 33.50±0.8 km 36.06±0.60 km 36.167±0.249 km
- Synodic rotation period: 27.76±0.05 h 27.83±0.01 h
- Geometric albedo: 0.0305±0.0420; 0.0396 (derived); 0.040±0.008; 0.04±0.02; 0.04±0.08; 0.0408±0.0074; 0.041±0.002; 0.047±0.007; 0.0475±0.002
- Spectral type: C · S (assumed)
- Absolute magnitude (H): 11.30 · 11.50 · 11.57 · 11.91 · 11.91±1.30

1233 Kobresia, provisional designation 1931 TG_{2}, is a carbonaceous background asteroid from the central regions of the asteroid belt, approximately 33 kilometers in diameter. It was discovered on 10 October 1931, by German astronomer Karl Reinmuth at the Heidelberg Observatory in southwest Germany. The asteroid was named for the grass-like flowering plant Kobresia, a genus in the sedge family.

== Orbit and classification ==
Kobresia is a non-family asteroid from the main belt's background population. It orbits the Sun in the central main-belt at a distance of 2.4–2.7 AU once every 4 years and 1 month (1,493 days; semi-major axis of 2.56 AU). Its orbit has an eccentricity of 0.06 and an inclination of 6° with respect to the ecliptic.

The body's observation arc begins with its first observation as 1927 TB at Heidelberg in October 1927, or four years prior to its official discovery observation.

== Physical characteristics ==
Kobresia has been characterized as a carbonaceous C-type asteroid by Pan-STARRS photometric survey.

=== Rotation period ===
Two rotational lightcurves of Kobresia were obtained by French amateur astronomer Pierre Antonini. Lightcurve analysis of his photometric observations made in 2004 and 2006, gave a rotation period of 27.76 and 27.83 hours with a brightness amplitude of 0.32 and 0.34 magnitude, respectively (U=2/2). While not being a slow rotator, Kobresia's period is longer than that of the average asteroid.

=== Diameter and albedo ===
According to the surveys carried out by the Infrared Astronomical Satellite IRAS, the Japanese Akari satellite and the NEOWISE mission of NASA's Wide-field Infrared Survey Explorer, Kobresia measures between 29.73 and 36.167 kilometers in diameter and its surface has an albedo between 0.0305 and 0.0475.

The Collaborative Asteroid Lightcurve Link derives an albedo of 0.0396 and a diameter of 33.45 kilometers based on an absolute magnitude of 11.5.

== Naming ==
This minor planet was named after a genus in the family Cyperaceae, Kobresia, a grass-like flowering plant, commonly known as "bog sedges". The author of the Dictionary of Minor Planet Names contacted Dutch astronomer Ingrid van Houten-Groeneveld in order to confirm the meaning of this asteroid's name.

=== Meta-naming ===
The initials of the minor planets (1227) through (1234), all discovered by Reinmuth, spell out "G. Stracke". Gustav Stracke was a German astronomer and orbit computer, who had asked that no planet be named after him. In this manner Reinmuth was able to honour the man whilst honoring his wish. Nevertheless, Reinmuth directly honored Stracke by naming planet 1019 Strackea later on. The astronomer Brian Marsden was honored by the same type of meta-naming using consecutive initial letters in 1995, spelling out "Brian M." in the sequence of minor planets (5694) through (5699).

=== Reinmuth's flowers ===
Due to his many discoveries, Karl Reinmuth submitted a large list of 66 newly named asteroids in the early 1930s. The list covered his discoveries with numbers between (1009) and (1200). This list also contained a sequence of 28 asteroids, starting with 1054 Forsytia, that were all named after plants, in particular flowering plants (also see list of minor planets named after animals and plants).
