= 1227 Geranium =

Carbonaceous background asteroid

Discovery
- Discovered by: K. Reinmuth
- Discovery site: Heidelberg Obs.
- Discovery date: 5 October 1931

Designations
- Pronunciation: /dʒəˈreɪniəm/
- Named after: Geranium (flowering plant)
- Alternative designations: 1931 TD · 1934 CL_{1}
- Minor planet category: main-belt · (outer) background

Orbital characteristics
- Epoch 4 September 2017 (JD 2458000.5)
- Uncertainty parameter 0
- Observation arc: 86.14 yr (31,463 d)
- Aphelion: 3.8358 AU
- Perihelion: 2.6018 AU
- Semi-major axis: 3.2188 AU
- Eccentricity: 0.1917
- Orbital period (sidereal): 5.77 yr (2,109 days)
- Mean anomaly: 23.697°
- Mean motion: 0° 10^{m} 14.52^{s} / day
- Inclination: 16.492°
- Longitude of ascending node: 0.7016°
- Argument of perihelion: 302.84°

Physical characteristics
- Dimensions: 41.46 km (derived); 46.08±0.80 km 46.269±0.140 km 51.025±0.535 km
- Synodic rotation period: 12.363±0.004 h
- Geometric albedo: 0.0492 (derived); 0.0619±0.0119; 0.071±0.016; 0.076±0.003
- Spectral type: C (SDSS–MFB)
- Absolute magnitude (H): 10.10 · 10.8

1227 Geranium, provisional designation 1931 TD, is a carbonaceous background asteroid from the outer regions of the asteroid belt, approximately 46 kilometers in diameter. It was discovered on 5 October 1931, by German astronomer Karl Reinmuth at the Heidelberg-Königstuhl State Observatory. The asteroid was named for the flowering plant Geranium (cranesbills).

== Orbit and classification ==
Geranium is a non-family asteroid from the main belt's background population. It orbits the Sun in the outer main-belt at a distance of 2.6–3.8 AU once every 5 years and 9 months (2,109 days; semi-major axis 3.22 AU). Its orbit has an eccentricity of 0.19 and an inclination of 16° with respect to the ecliptic.

The body's observation arc begins at Uccle Observatory, four days after its official discovery observation at Heidelberg.

== Physical characteristics ==
Geranium has been characterized as a carbonaceous C-type asteroid by SDSS–MFB (Masi Foglia Bus).

=== Rotation period ===
In April 2010, a rotational lightcurve of Geranium was obtained from photometric observations by astronomers at the Oakley Southern Sky Observatory in Australia. Lightcurve analysis gave a well-defined rotation period of 12.363 hours with a brightness amplitude of 0.08 magnitude, indicative for a rather spherical shape (U=3).

=== Diameter and albedo ===
According to the surveys carried out by the Japanese Akari satellite and the NEOWISE mission of NASA's Wide-field Infrared Survey Explorer, Geranium measures between 46.08 and 51.025 kilometers in diameter and its surface has an albedo between 0.0619 and 0.076.

The Collaborative Asteroid Lightcurve Link derives an albedo of 0.0492 and a diameter of 41.46 kilometers based on an absolute magnitude of 10.8.

== Naming ==
This minor planet was named after Geranium, a genus of flowering plants commonly known as "cranesbills". The official naming citation was mentioned in The Names of the Minor Planets by Paul Herget in 1955 (H 113).

=== Meta-naming ===
The initials of the minor planets (1227) through (1234), all discovered by Reinmuth, spell out "G. Stracke". Gustav Stracke was a German astronomer and orbit computer, who had asked that no planet be named after him. In this manner Reinmuth was able to honour the man whilst honoring his wish. Nevertheless, Reinmuth directly honored Stracke by naming planet 1019 Strackea later on. The astronomer Brian Marsden was honored by the same type of meta-naming using consecutive initial letters in 1995, spelling out "Brian M." in the sequence of minor planets (5694) through (5699).

=== Reinmuth's flowers ===
Due to his many discoveries, Karl Reinmuth submitted a large list of 66 newly named asteroids in the early 1930s. The list covered his discoveries with numbers between (1009) and (1200). This list also contained a sequence of 28 asteroids, starting with 1054 Forsytia, that were all named after plants, in particular flowering plants (also see list of minor planets named after animals and plants).
