= 1229 Tilia =

Themistian asteroid

Discovery
- Discovered by: K. Reinmuth
- Discovery site: Heidelberg Obs.
- Discovery date: 9 October 1931

Designations
- Pronunciation: /ˈtɪliə/
- Named after: Tilia (flowering plant)
- Alternative designations: 1931 TP_{1} · 1936 MC; 1942 PH · 1948 PT; 1951 AC · 1951 CM; 1973 YW_{3} · 1975 FP; 1976 KB_{1} · 1977 RC_{4} 1978 VK_{4}
- Minor planet category: main-belt · (outer); Themis

Orbital characteristics
- Epoch 4 September 2017 (JD 2458000.5)
- Uncertainty parameter 0
- Observation arc: 85.74 yr (31,318 d)
- Aphelion: 3.7569 AU
- Perihelion: 2.6918 AU
- Semi-major axis: 3.2243 AU
- Eccentricity: 0.1652
- Orbital period (sidereal): 5.79 yr (2,115 days)
- Mean anomaly: 283.97°
- Mean motion: 0° 10^{m} 12.72^{s} / day
- Inclination: 1.0392°
- Longitude of ascending node: 197.37°
- Argument of perihelion: 166.53°

Physical characteristics
- Dimensions: 27.795±0.276 km
- Geometric albedo: 0.069±0.008
- Absolute magnitude (H): 11.3

1229 Tilia /ˈtɪliə/ is a dark Themistian asteroid from the outermost regions of the asteroid belt, approximately 28 kilometers in diameter. It was discovered on 9 October 1931, by astronomer Karl Reinmuth at the Heidelberg Observatory in southwest Germany, and given the provisional designation 1931 TP_{1}. The asteroid was named for the genus of trees, Tilia (lime tree, linden, basswood).

== Orbit and classification ==
Tilia belongs to the Themis family (602), a very large family of carbonaceous asteroids, named after 24 Themis. It orbits the Sun in the outermost asteroid belt at a distance of 2.7–3.8 AU once every 5 years and 9 months (2,115 days; semi-major axis of 3.22 AU). Its orbit has an eccentricity of 0.17 and an inclination of 1° with respect to the ecliptic.

The body's observation arc begins with a precovery taken at Lowell Observatory on 7 October 1931, or two days prior to its official discovery observation at Heidelberg.

== Physical characteristics ==
The asteroid's spectral type is unknown. Members of the Themis family are typically C-type asteroids. Tilia's albedo (see below) agrees with this spectral type.

=== Diameter and albedo ===
According to the survey carried out by the NEOWISE mission of NASA's Wide-field Infrared Survey Explorer, Tilia measures 27.795 kilometers in diameter and its surface has an albedo of 0.069.

=== Rotation period ===
As of 2018, no rotational lightcurve of Tilia has been obtained from photometric observations. The asteroid's rotation period, spin axis and shape remain unknown.

== Naming ==
This minor planet was named after, Tilia – commonly known as lime tree, linden, or basswood – a genus of trees in the family Tiliaceae. The official naming citation was mentioned in The Names of the Minor Planets by Paul Herget in 1955 (H 113).

=== Meta-naming ===
The initials of the minor planets (1227) through (1234), all discovered by Reinmuth, spell out "G. Stracke". Gustav Stracke was a German astronomer and orbit computer, who had asked that no planet be named after him. In this manner Reinmuth was able to honour the man whilst honoring his wish. Nevertheless, Reinmuth directly honored Stracke by naming planet 1019 Strackea later on. The astronomer Brian Marsden was honored by the same type of meta-naming using consecutive initial letters in 1995, spelling out "Brian M." in the sequence of minor planets (5694) through (5699).

=== Reinmuth's flowers ===
Due to his many discoveries, Karl Reinmuth submitted a large list of 66 newly named asteroids in the early 1930s. The list covered his discoveries with numbers between (1009) and (1200). This list also contained a sequence of 28 asteroids, starting with 1054 Forsytia, that were all named after plants, in particular flowering plants (also see list of minor planets named after animals and plants).
