= 1234 Elyna =

Eoan asteroid

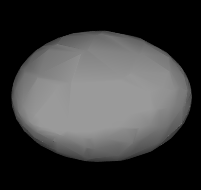
- Lightcurve-based 3D-model of 1234 Elyna.

Discovery
- Discovered by: K. Reinmuth
- Discovery site: Heidelberg Obs.
- Discovery date: 18 October 1931

Designations
- Pronunciation: /ɪˈlaɪnə/
- Named after: Elȳna (Kobresia) (flowering plant)
- Alternative designations: 1931 UF · 1933 BN
- Minor planet category: main-belt · (outer); Eos

Orbital characteristics
- Epoch 4 September 2017 (JD 2458000.5)
- Uncertainty parameter 0
- Observation arc: 85.63 yr (31,277 days)
- Aphelion: 3.2788 AU
- Perihelion: 2.7526 AU
- Semi-major axis: 3.0157 AU
- Eccentricity: 0.0873
- Orbital period (sidereal): 5.24 yr (1,913 days)
- Mean anomaly: 148.48°
- Mean motion: 0° 11^{m} 17.52^{s} / day
- Inclination: 8.5120°
- Longitude of ascending node: 304.68°
- Argument of perihelion: 87.424°

Physical characteristics
- Dimensions: 22.876±0.465 km 22.88±0.47 km 25.38±8.51 km 25.70±3.2 km 26.00 km (derived); 29.08±0.90 km
- Synodic rotation period: 5.421±0.001 h 5.4219±0.0001 h 5.4221±0.0001 h 17.6 h (poor)
- Geometric albedo: 0.055±0.004; 0.0672±0.020; 0.10±0.07; 0.1286 (derived); 0.162±0.031
- Spectral type: SMASS = K
- Absolute magnitude (H): 10.71±0.24 · 10.77 · 10.80 · 10.9 · 10.98 · 11.50

1234 Elyna /ɪˈlaɪnə/, provisional designation 1931 UF, is an Eoan asteroid from the outer regions of the asteroid belt, approximately 25 kilometers in diameter. It was discovered on 18 October 1931, by astronomer Karl Reinmuth at the Heidelberg-Königstuhl State Observatory. The asteroid was named after the flowering plant Elyna (Kobresia; bog sedges).

== Orbit and classification ==
Elyna is a member the Eos family (606), the largest asteroid family of the outer main belt consisting of nearly 10,000 asteroids. It orbits the Sun at a distance of 2.8–3.3 AU once every 5 years and 3 months (1,913 days; semi-major axis 3.02 AU). Its orbit has an eccentricity of 0.09 and an inclination of 9° with respect to the ecliptic. The body's observation arc begins at Heidelberg, four days after its official discovery observation.

== Physical characteristics ==
In the SMASS classification, Elyna is a K-type asteroid, which agrees with the overall spectral type for members of the Eos family.

=== Rotation period ===
Several rotational lightcurves of Elyna were obtained from photometric observations since 1983. Lightcurve analysis gave a rotation period of 5.421 hours with a consolidated brightness amplitude between 0.21 and 0.37 magnitude (U=3-/2/3/1).

=== Diameter and albedo ===
According to the surveys carried out by the Infrared Astronomical Satellite IRAS, the Japanese Akari satellite and the NEOWISE mission of NASA's Wide-field Infrared Survey Explorer, Elyna measures between 22.876 and 29.08 kilometers in diameter and its surface has an albedo between 0.055 and 0.162.

The Collaborative Asteroid Lightcurve Link derives an albedo of 0.1286 and a diameter of 26.00 kilometers based on an absolute magnitude of 10.77.

== Naming ==
This minor planet was named after the flowering plant Elyna, a subgenus of the genus Kobresia in the family Cyperaceae, sometimes called bog sedges. The official naming citation was mentioned in The Names of the Minor Planets by Paul Herget in 1955 (H 114).

=== Meta-naming ===
The initials of the minor planets (1227) through (1234), all discovered by Reinmuth, spell out "G. Stracke". Gustav Stracke was a German astronomer and orbit computer, who had asked that no planet be named after him. In this manner Reinmuth was able to honour the man whilst honoring his wish. Nevertheless, Reinmuth directly honored Stracke by naming planet 1019 Strackea later on. The astronomer Brian Marsden was honored by the same type of meta-naming using consecutive initial letters in 1995, spelling out "Brian M." in the sequence of minor planets (5694) through (5699).

=== Reinmuth's flowers ===
Due to his many discoveries, Karl Reinmuth submitted a large list of 66 newly named asteroids in the early 1930s. The list covered his discoveries with numbers between (1009) and (1200). This list also contained a sequence of 28 asteroids, starting with 1054 Forsytia, that were all named after plants, in particular flowering plants (also see list of minor planets named after animals and plants).
