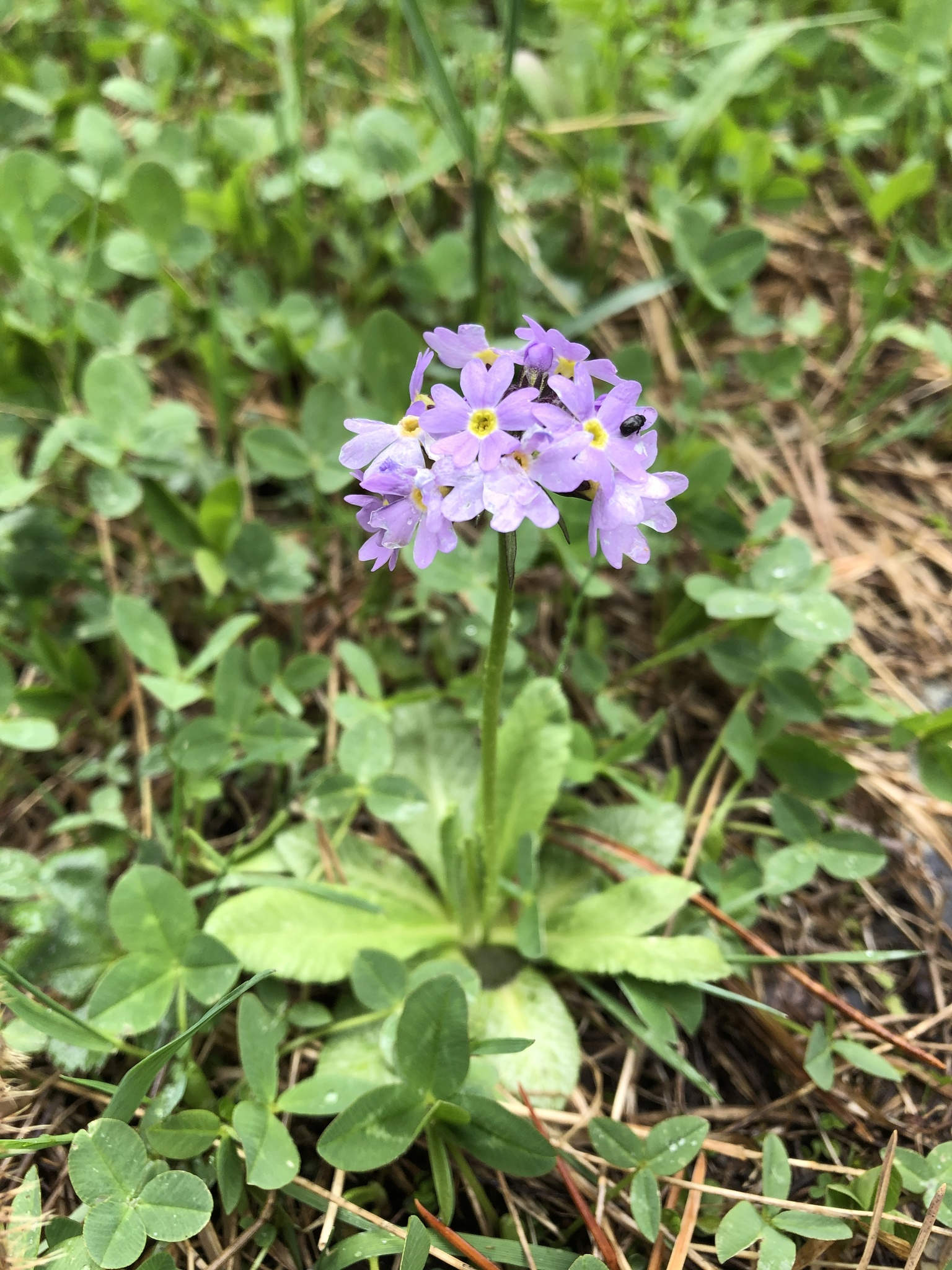

Scientific classification
- Kingdom: Plantae
- Clade: Tracheophytes
- Clade: Angiosperms
- Clade: Eudicots
- Clade: Asterids
- Order: Ericales
- Family: Primulaceae
- Genus: Primula
- Species: P. algida

Binomial name
- Primula algida Adams

= Primula algida =

Species of flowering plant

Primula algida is a species of flowering plant within the family Primulaceae. This species was first described by Michael Friedrich Adams.

== Description ==
Primula algida is a perennial species. Leaves are elliptic and grow from 1–6 cm (0.39–2.36 in) long. The plant can grow from 3–20 cm (1.2–7.9 in) tall when in flower due to its stem. Each stem holds 4 or more flowers, which can range in colour from mauve to violet. The roots of this species are thin and white.

== Distribution ==
The native range of P. algida includes: Caucasus, Northern Iran, Northern Altai Republic, Mongolia, Pamir-Alay and Afghanistan.

== Habitat ==
Primula algida grows on moist ground among grasses in alpine areas and wet meadows.

It also inhabits south facing rock ledges, cliffs and slopes.

This species is found at elevations between 2,000–7,000 m (6,560–22,970 ft).

== Gallery ==
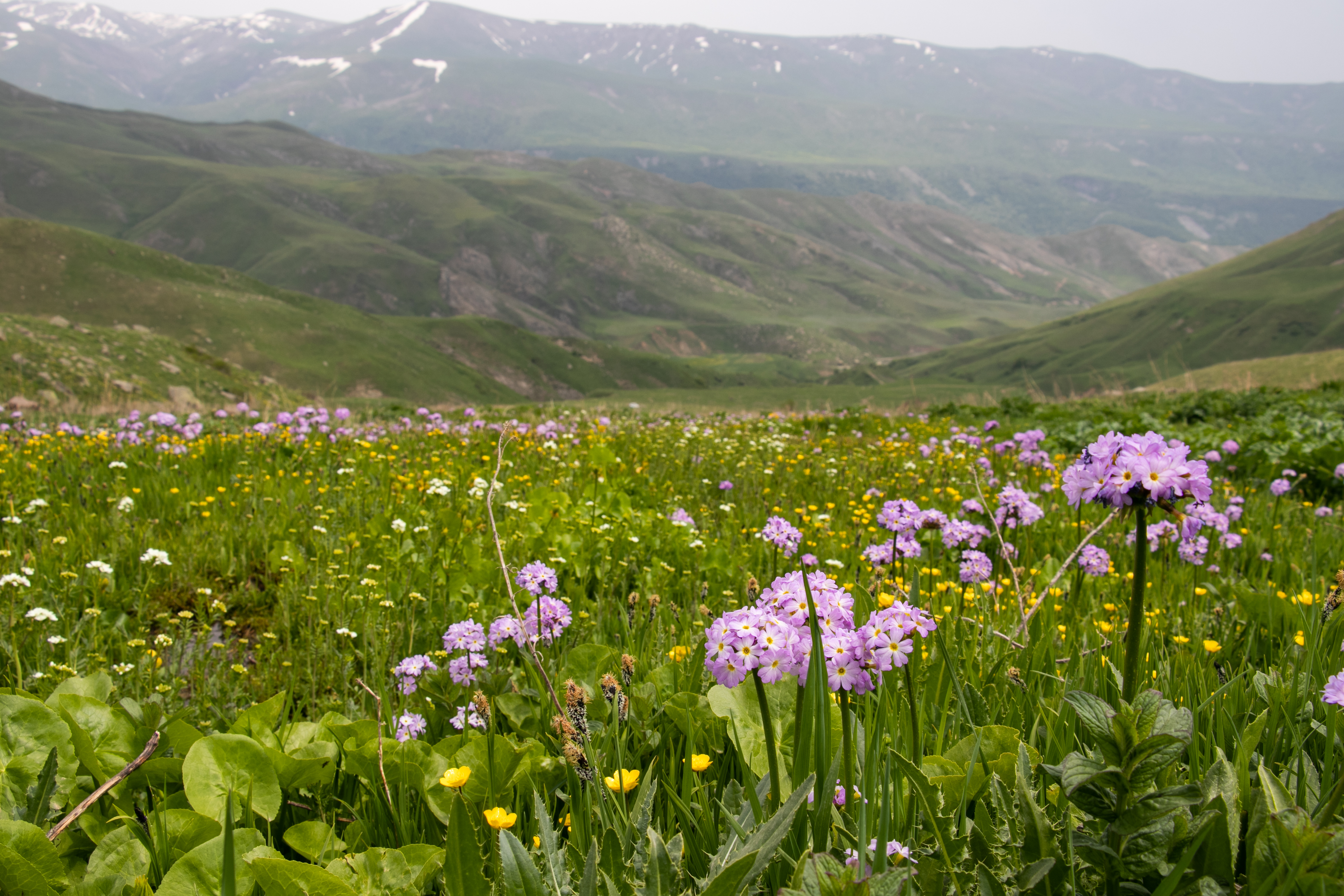
P. algida growing in a meadow.

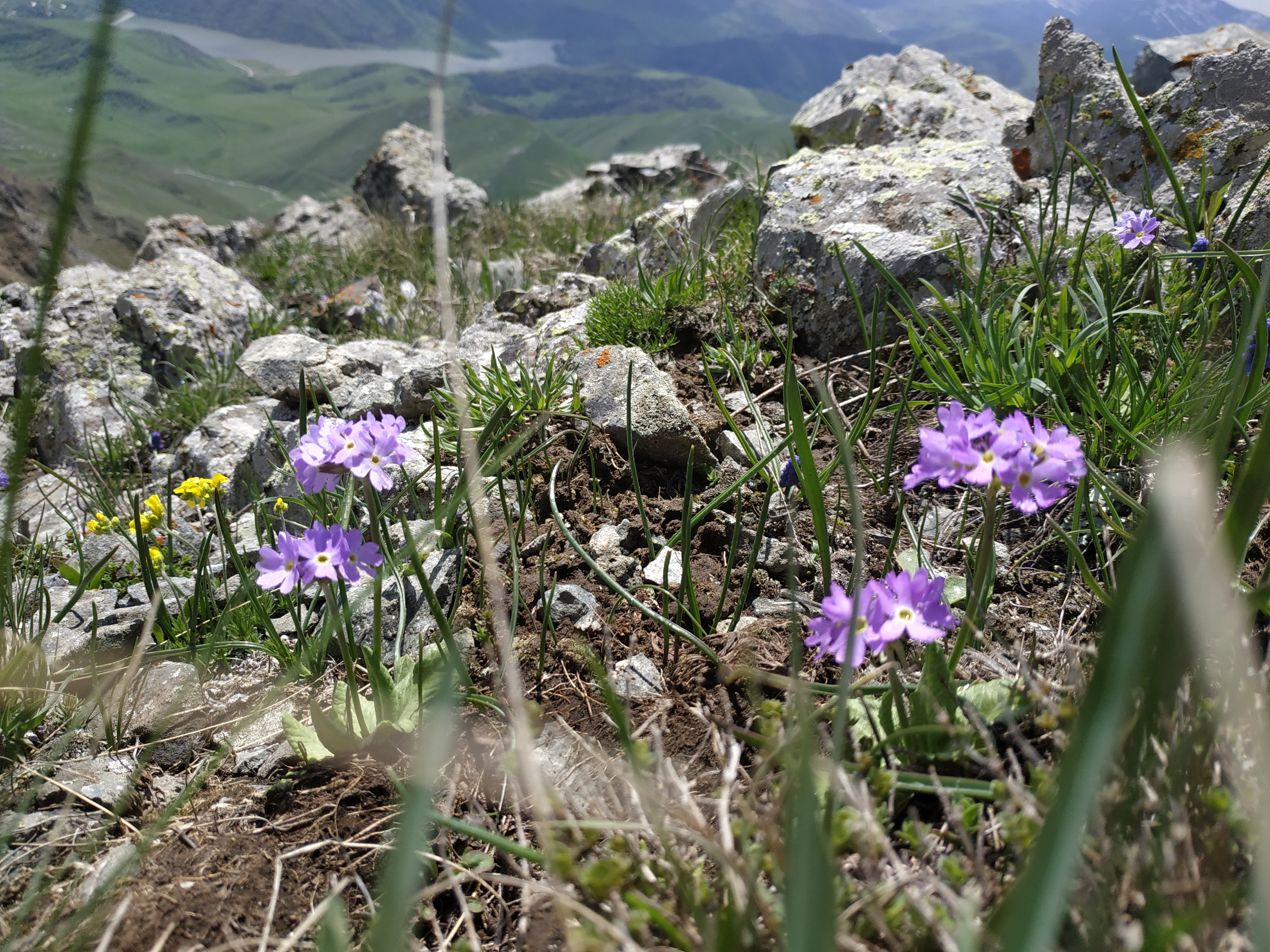
P. algida growing on a rocky mountain.

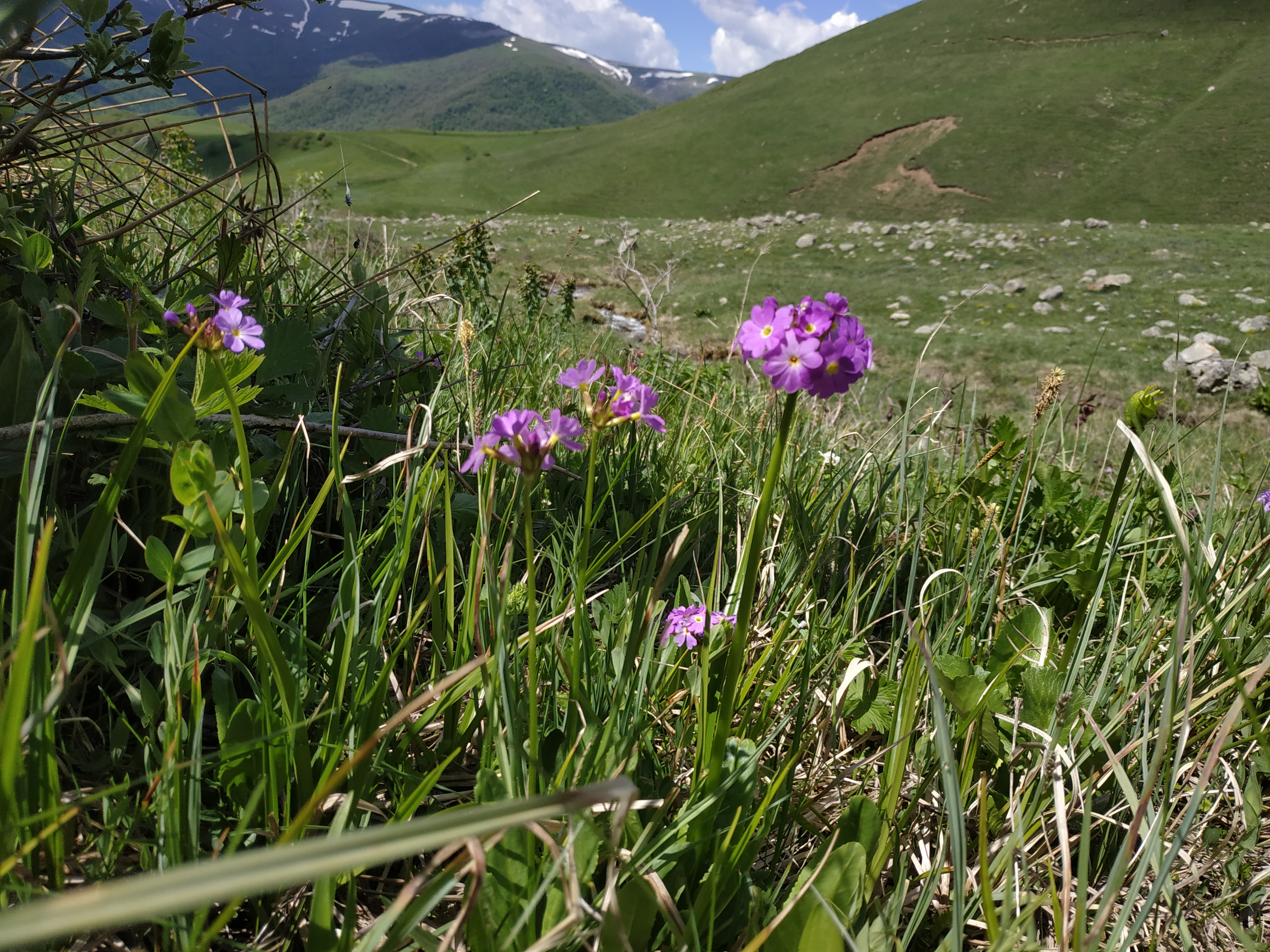
P. algida growing in a grassland.
