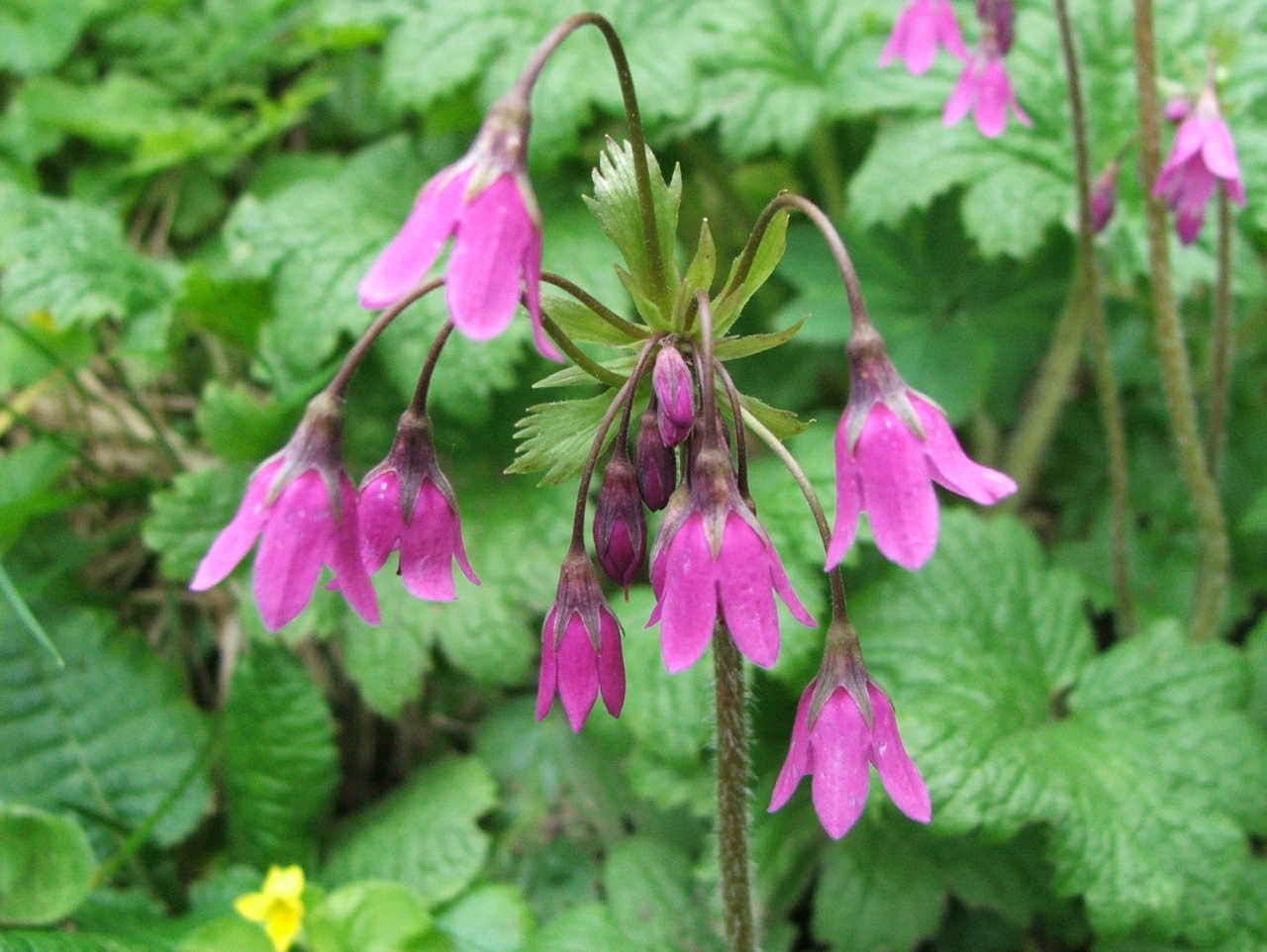

Scientific classification
- Kingdom: Plantae
- Clade: Tracheophytes
- Clade: Angiosperms
- Clade: Eudicots
- Clade: Asterids
- Order: Ericales
- Family: Primulaceae
- Genus: Primula
- Species: P. matthioli

Binomial name
- Primula matthioli (L.) V.A.Richt.

Subspecies
- See text.

Synonyms
- Cortusa matthioli L.

= Primula matthioli =

Alpine bells

Species of flowering plant

Primula matthioli, synonym Cortusa matthioli, sometimes called alpine bells, is a flowering plant with a wide distribution in the Palearctic, both in Europe and in temperate Asia, from Siberia in the north to Afghanistan, Pakistan and China in the south.

== Subspecies ==
Many subspecies are recognized. Some have been treated as separate species, particularly in the formerly accepted genus Cortusa.

- Primula matthioli subsp. altaica (Losinsk.) Kovt., syn. Cortusa altaica
- Primula matthioli subsp. brotheri (R.Knuth) Kovt., syns. Cortusa brotheri, Primula brotheri
- Primula matthioli subsp. discolor (Vorosch. & Gorovoj) Kovt., syn. Cortusa discolor
- Primula matthioli subsp. himalaica (Losinsk.) Kovt., syn. Cortusa himalaica
- Primula matthioli subsp. matthioli, syns. Cortusa gradissima, Primula cortusa
- Primula matthioli subsp. mongolica (Losinsk.) Kovt., syn. Cortusa mongolica
- Primula matthioli subsp. pekinensis (V.A.Richt.) Kovt., syns. Cortusa coreana, Cortusa pekinensis, Primula coreana
- Primula matthioli subsp. pubens (Schott, Nyman & Kotschy) Kovt., syn. Cortusa pubens
- Primula matthioli subsp. sachalinensis (Losinsk.) Kovt., syns. Cortusa amurensis, Cortusa jozana, Cortusa sachalinensis
- Primula matthioli subsp. sibirica (Andrz. ex Besser) Kovt., syns. Cortusa insularis, Cortusa jacutica, Cortusa sibirica
- Primula matthioli subsp. turkestanica (Losinsk.) Kovt., syn. Cortusa turkestanica
