= 1054 Forsytia =

Dark background asteroid

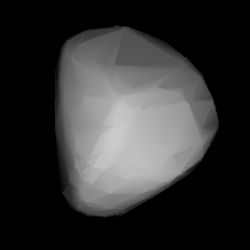
- Shape model of Forsytia from its lightcurve

Discovery
- Discovered by: K. Reinmuth
- Discovery site: Heidelberg Obs.
- Discovery date: 20 November 1925

Designations
- Pronunciation: /fɔːrˈsɪtiə/
- Named after: Forsythia (flowering plant)
- Alternative designations: 1925 WD · 1962 DD; A907 EA
- Minor planet category: main-belt · (outer) background

Orbital characteristics
- Epoch 4 September 2017 (JD 2458000.5)
- Uncertainty parameter 0
- Observation arc: 110.32 yr (40,295 days)
- Aphelion: 3.3198 AU
- Perihelion: 2.5284 AU
- Semi-major axis: 2.9241 AU
- Eccentricity: 0.1353
- Orbital period (sidereal): 5.00 yr (1,826 days)
- Mean anomaly: 165.01°
- Mean motion: 0° 11^{m} 49.56^{s} / day
- Inclination: 10.849°
- Longitude of ascending node: 85.888°
- Argument of perihelion: 294.19°

Physical characteristics
- Dimensions: 42.867±11.18 km 45.42 km (derived); 45.47±4.3 km 46.40±13.38 km 46.69±15.08 km 47.780±3.344 km 53.04±0.71 km
- Synodic rotation period: 7.650±0.001 h
- Geometric albedo: 0.035±0.013; 0.04±0.07; 0.048±0.002; 0.05±0.03; 0.0592 (derived); 0.0648±0.014; 0.0750±0.0441
- Spectral type: C (assumed)
- Absolute magnitude (H): 10.12 · 10.12±0.51 · 10.30 · 10.40 · 10.46 · 10.87

1054 Forsytia /fɔːrˈsɪtiə/ is a dark background asteroid, approximately 46 kilometers in diameter, from the outer regions of the asteroid belt. It was discovered on 20 November 1925, by astronomer Karl Reinmuth at the Heidelberg-Königstuhl State Observatory in southwest Germany and assigned provisional designation 1925 WD. It is named after the flowering plant forsythia, and marks the beginning of a sequence of 28 thematically named asteroids by the discoverer.

== Orbit and classification ==
Forsytia is a non-family asteroid from the main belt's background population. It orbits the Sun in the outer asteroid belt at a distance of 2.5–3.3 AU once every 5.00 years (1,826 days; semi-major axis of 2.92 AU). Its orbit has an eccentricity of 0.14 and an inclination of 11° with respect to the ecliptic. The asteroid was first observed as A907 EA at Heidelberg in March 1907. The body's observation arc begins with its official discovery observation in November 1925.

== Naming ==
This minor planet was named after forsythia, a genus of flowering shrubs in the family Oleaceae. The official naming citation was mentioned in The Names of the Minor Planets by Paul Herget in 1955 (H 100).

=== Reinmuth's flowers ===
Due to his many discoveries, Karl Reinmuth submitted a large list of 66 newly named asteroids in the early 1930s. The list covered his discoveries with numbers between (1009) and (1200). This list also contained a sequence of 28 asteroids, starting with this asteroid, that were all named after plants, in particular flowering plants (also see list of minor planets named after animals and plants).

== Physical characteristics ==
Forsytia is an assumed carbonaceous C-type asteroid.

=== Rotation period ===
In March 2002, a rotational lightcurve of Forsytia was obtained from photometric observations by American amateur astronomer John Gross at his Sonoran Skies Observatory (G94) in Arizona. Lightcurve analysis gave a well-defined rotation period of 7.650 hours with a brightness amplitude of 0.23 magnitude (U=3).

=== Diameter and albedo ===
According to the surveys carried out by the Infrared Astronomical Satellite IRAS, the Japanese Akari satellite and the NEOWISE mission of NASA's Wide-field Infrared Survey Explorer, Forsytia measures between 42.867 and 53.04 kilometers in diameter and its surface has an albedo between 0.035 and 0.0750. The Collaborative Asteroid Lightcurve Link derives an albedo of 0.0592 and a diameter of 45.42 kilometers based on an absolute magnitude of 10.4.
