= List of craters on the Moon: L–N =

The list of approved names in the Gazetteer of Planetary Nomenclature maintained by the International Astronomical Union includes the diameter of the crater and the person the crater is named for. Where a crater formation has associated satellite craters, these are detailed on the main crater description pages.

List of craters on the Moon

- A
- B
- C
- D
- E
- F
- G
- H
- I
- J
- K
- L
- M
- N
- O
- P
- Q
- R
- S
- T
- U
- V
- W
- X
- Y
- Z

== L ==
| Crater | Coordinates | Diameter (km) | Approval Year | Eponym | Ref |
|---|---|---|---|---|---|
| L. Clark | 43.34°S 147.7°W | 15.3 | 2006 | Laurel Blair Salton Clark (1961–2003) | WGPSN |
| La Caille | 23.68°S 1.08°E | 67.22 | 1935 | Nicolas Louis de Lacaille (1713–1762) | WGPSN |
| La Condamine | 53.54°N 28.22°W | 37.83 | 1935 | Charles Marie de La Condamine (1701–1774) | WGPSN |
| La Pérouse | 10.67°S 76.28°E | 80.4 | 1935 | Jean-François de Galaup, comte de La Pérouse (1741–1788) | WGPSN |
| Lacchini | 41.29°N 107.83°W | 57.95 | 1970 | Giovanni Lacchini (1884–1967) | WGPSN |
| Lacroix | 37.93°S 59.2°W | 36.07 | 1935 | Sylvestre Francois de Lacroix (1765–1843) | WGPSN |
| Lade | 1.33°S 9.99°E | 58.11 | 1935 | Heinrich Eduard von Lade (1817–1904) | WGPSN |
| Lagalla | 44.48°S 22.36°W | 88.78 | 1935 | Giulio Cesare Lagalla (1571–1624) | WGPSN |
| Lagrange | 32.6°S 71.45°W | 162.21 | 1935 | Joseph Louis Lagrange (1736–1813) | WGPSN |
| Lalande | 4.46°S 8.65°W | 23.54 | 1935 | Joseph Jérôme Le François de Lalande (1732–1807) | WGPSN |
| Lallemand | 14.4°S 84.21°W | 16.69 | 1985 | André Lallemand (1904–1978) | WGPSN |
| Lamarck | 23.12°S 70.06°W | 114.65 | 1964 | Jean-Baptiste Pierre Antoine de Monet, Chevalier de Lamarck (1744–1829) | WGPSN |
| Lamb | 42.67°S 100.94°E | 103.55 | 1970 | Sir Horace Lamb (1849–1934) | WGPSN |
| Lambert | 25.77°N 20.99°W | 30.12 | 1935 | Johann Heinrich Lambert (1728–1777) | WGPSN |
| Lamé | 14.76°S 64.56°E | 84.28 | 1964 | Gabriel Lamé (1795–1870) | WGPSN |
| Lamèch | 42.79°N 13.15°E | 12.41 | 1935 | Félix Chemla Lamèch (1894–1962) | WGPSN |
| Lamont | 5.14°N 23.32°E | 83.23 | 1935 | Johann von Lamont (1805–1879) | WGPSN |
| Lampland | 31.17°S 131.51°E | 63.04 | 1970 | Carl Otto Lampland (1873–1951) | WGPSN |
| Landau | 42.16°N 119.34°W | 218.15 | 1970 | Lev Davidovich Landau (1908–1968) | WGPSN |
| Lander | 15.34°S 131.81°E | 40.05 | 1976 | Richard Lemon Lander (1804–1834) | WGPSN |
| Landsteiner | 31.3°N 14.79°W | 6.11 | 1976 | Karl Landsteiner (1868–1943) | WGPSN |
| Lane | 9.5°S 132.36°E | 53.76 | 1970 | Jonathan Homer Lane (1819–1880) | WGPSN |
| Langemak | 9.93°S 119.45°E | 104.76 | 1970 | Georgy Erikhovich Langemak (1898–1938) | WGPSN |
| Langevin | 44.17°N 162.69°E | 57.8 | 1970 | Paul Langevin (1872–1946) | WGPSN |
| Langley | 51.17°N 86.05°W | 59.17 | 1964 | Samuel Pierpont Langley (1834–1906) | WGPSN |
| Langmuir | 35.85°S 128.89°W | 91.5 | 1970 | Irving Langmuir (1881–1957) | WGPSN |
| Langrenus | 8.86°S 61.04°E | 131.98 | 1935 | Michel van Langren (circa 1600–1675) | WGPSN |
| Lansberg | 0.31°S 26.63°W | 38.75 | 1935 | Philippe van Lansberg (1561–1632) | WGPSN |
| Larmor | 31.85°N 179.67°W | 99.49 | 1970 | Sir Joseph Larmor (1857–1942) | WGPSN |
| Lassell | 15.49°S 7.9°W | 21.82 | 1935 | William Lassell (1799–1880) | WGPSN |
| Laue | 28.29°N 97.05°W | 89.17 | 1970 | Max von Laue (1879–1960) | WGPSN |
| Lauritsen | 27.54°S 96.31°E | 51.24 | 1970 | Charles Christian Lauritsen (1892–1968) | WGPSN |
| Laveran | 81.8°S 159.78°W | 12.52 | 2009 | Charles Louis Alphonse Laveran (1845–1922) | WGPSN |
| Lavoisier | 38.17°N 81.25°W | 71.01 | 1935 | Antoine-Laurent de Lavoisier (1743–1794) | WGPSN |
| Lawrence | 7.35°N 43.3°E | 24.02 | 1973 | Ernest Orlando Lawrence (1901–1958) and Robert Henry Lawrence, Jr. (1935–1993) | WGPSN |
| Le Gentil | 74.27°S 76.02°W | 125.38 | 1935 | Guillaume Hyacinthe Le Gentil (1725–1792) | WGPSN |
| Le Monnier | 26.66°N 30.5°E | 68.4 | 1935 | Pierre Charles Lemonnier (1715–1799) | WGPSN |
| Le Verrier | 40.33°N 20.61°W | 20.52 | 1935 | Urbain Jean Le Verrier (1811–1877) | WGPSN |
| Leakey | 3.19°S 37.46°E | 12.48 | 1976 | Louis Seymour Bazett Leakey (1903–1972) | WGPSN |
| Leavitt | 44.86°S 139.89°W | 69.31 | 1970 | Henrietta Swan Leavitt (1868–1921) | WGPSN |
| Lebedev | 46.8°S 107.89°E | 121.8 | 1970 | Pyotr Nikolaevich Lebedev (1866–1912) | WGPSN |
| Lebedinskiy | 7.84°N 164.89°W | 63.39 | 1970 | Aleksandr I. Lebedinskiy (1913–1967) | WGPSN |
| Lebesgue | 5.14°S 88.97°E | 11.39 | 1976 | Henri Léon Lebesgue (1875–1941) | WGPSN |
| Lee | 30.66°S 40.76°W | 41.17 | 1935 | John Lee (1783–1866) | WGPSN |
| Leeuwenhoek | 29.28°S 178.87°W | 125 | 1970 | Antony van Leeuwenhoek (1632–1723) | WGPSN |
| Legendre | 28.92°S 70.02°E | 78.08 | 1935 | Adrien Marie Legendre (1752–1833) | WGPSN |
| Lehmann | 39.96°S 56.17°W | 53.85 | 1935 | Jacob Heinrich Wilhelm Lehmann (1800–1863) | WGPSN |
| Leibnitz | 38.24°S 179.35°E | 236.67 | 1970 | Gottfried Wilhelm von Leibniz (1646–1716) | WGPSN |
| Lemaître | 61.36°S 149.98°W | 93.7 | 1970 | Georges Lemaître (1894–1966) | WGPSN |
| Lenard | 85.19°N 109.69°W | 47.65 | 2008 | Philipp Eduard Anton von Lénárd (1862–1947) | WGPSN |
| Lents | 2.72°N 102.3°W | 21.98 | 1970 | Heinrich Friedrich Emil Lenz (1804–1865) | WGPSN |
| Leonid | 38.3°N 35°W | 0.1 | 2012 | Russian male name | WGPSN |
| Leonov | 19.07°N 148.36°E | 34.04 | 1970 | Alexei Arkhipovich Leonov (1934–2019) | WGPSN |
| Lepaute | 33.3°S 33.69°W | 16.36 | 1935 | Nicole-Reine Etable de la Briere Lepaute (1723–1788) | WGPSN |
| Letronne | 10.5°S 42.49°W | 117.59 | 1935 | Jean Antoine Letronne (1787–1848) | WGPSN |
| Leucippus | 29.24°N 116.41°W | 57.03 | 1970 | Leucippus (flourished circa 440 B.C.) | WGPSN |
| Leuschner | 1.67°N 109.05°W | 50.14 | 1970 | Armin Otto Leuschner (1868–1953) | WGPSN |
| Lev | 12.69°N 62.2°E | 0.06 | 2012 | Russian male name | WGPSN |
| Levi-Civita | 23.34°S 143.14°E | 108.23 | 1970 | Tullio Levi-Civita (1873–1941) | WGPSN |
| Lewis | 18.51°S 114.23°W | 40.32 | 1970 | Gilbert Newton Lewis (1875–1946) | WGPSN |
| Lexell | 35.78°S 4.27°W | 63.7 | 1935 | Anders Johan Lexell (1740–1784) | WGPSN |
| Ley | 42.11°N 154.84°E | 81.05 | 1970 | Willy Ley (1906–1969) | WGPSN |
| Licetus | 47.19°S 6.54°E | 75.42 | 1935 | Fortunio Liceti (1577–1657) | WGPSN |
| Lichtenberg | 31.85°N 67.72°W | 19.53 | 1935 | Georg Christoph Lichtenberg (1742–1799) | WGPSN |
| Lick | 12.36°N 52.84°E | 31.63 | 1935 | James Lick (1796–1876) | WGPSN |
| Liebig | 24.35°S 48.3°W | 38.96 | 1935 | Freiherr Justus von Liebig (1803–1873) | WGPSN |
| Lilius | 54.6°S 6.09°E | 61.18 | 1935 | Luigi Giglio (died 1576) | WGPSN |
| Linda | 30.69°N 33.38°W | 1.11 | 1979 | (Spanish female name) | WGPSN |
| Lindbergh | 5.41°S 52.9°E | 13.34 | 1976 | Charles Augustus Lindbergh (1902–1974) | WGPSN |
| Lindblad | 70.03°N 99.22°W | 59.37 | 1970 | Bertil Lindblad (1895–1965) | WGPSN |
| Lindenau | 32.35°S 24.77°E | 53.08 | 1935 | Bernhard von Lindenau (1780–1854) | WGPSN |
| Lindsay | 7°S 13.01°E | 32.23 | 1979 | Eric Mervyn Lindsay (1907–1974) | WGPSN |
| Linné | 27.75°N 11.8°E | 2.23 | 1935 | Carl von Linné (1707–1778) | WGPSN |
| Liouville | 2.73°N 73.57°E | 16.12 | 1973 | Joseph Liouville (1809–1882) | WGPSN |
| Lippershey | 25.96°S 10.38°W | 6.74 | 1935 | Hans Lippershey (died 1619) | WGPSN |
| Lippmann | 55.43°S 114.32°W | 160.07 | 1979 | Gabriel Lippmann (1845–1921) | WGPSN |
| Lipskiy | 2.15°S 179.38°W | 91.15 | 1979 | Yuriy N. Lipskiy (1909–1978) | WGPSN |
| Litke | 16.76°S 123.12°E | 38.18 | 1970 | Fyodor Petrovich Litke (Lütke) (1797–1882) | WGPSN |
| Littrow | 21.5°N 31.39°E | 28.52 | 1935 | Johann Josef von Littrow (1781–1840) | WGPSN |
| Lobachevskiy | 9.76°N 113.07°E | 87.26 | 1961 | Nikolai Ivanovich Lobachevsky (1793–1856) | WGPSN |
| Lockyer | 46.27°S 36.59°E | 35.08 | 1935 | Sir Joseph Norman Lockyer (1836–1920) | WGPSN |
| Lodygin | 17.42°S 146.78°W | 56.11 | 1970 | Alexander Nikolayevich Lodygin (1847–1923) | WGPSN |
| Loewy | 22.69°S 32.85°W | 22.45 | 1935 | Moritz Loewy (1833–1907) | WGPSN |
| Lohrmann | 0.44°S 67.38°W | 31.25 | 1935 | Wilhelm Gotthelf Lohrmann (1796–1840) | WGPSN |
| Lohse | 13.76°S 60.31°E | 43.34 | 1935 | Oswald Lohse (1845–1915) | WGPSN |
| Lomonosov | 27.35°N 98.28°E | 90.69 | 1961 | Mikhail Lomonosov (1711–1765) | WGPSN |
| Longomontanus | 49.55°S 21.88°W | 145.5 | 1935 | Christian Sørensen Longomontanus (1562–1647) | WGPSN |
| Lorentz | 34.59°N 97.19°W | 378.42 | 1970 | Hendrik Antoon Lorentz (1853–1928) | WGPSN |
| Louise | 28.49°N 34.2°W | 0.64 | 1979 | (French female name) | WGPSN |
| Louville | 44.12°N 46.04°W | 34.81 | 1935 | Jacques D'Allonville, Chevalier de Louville (1671–1732) | WGPSN |
| Love | 6.33°S 129.17°E | 90.08 | 1970 | Augustus Edward Hough Love (1863–1940) | WGPSN |
| Lovelace | 82.08°N 109.51°W | 57.06 | 1970 | William Randolph Lovelace II (1907–1965) | WGPSN |
| Lovell | 36.74°S 142.47°W | 35.1 | 1970 | James Lovell (1928-live) | WGPSN |
| Lowell | 12.97°S 103.42°W | 62.65 | 1970 | Percival Lowell (1855–1916) | WGPSN |
| Lubbock | 3.99°S 41.79°E | 14.09 | 1935 | John William Lubbock (1803–1865) | WGPSN |
| Lubiniezky | 17.88°S 23.89°W | 42.97 | 1935 | Stanislaus Lubiniezky (1623–1675) | WGPSN |
| Lucian | 14.34°N 36.78°E | 6.85 | 1973 | Lucian of Samosata (125–190) | WGPSN |
| Lucretius | 8.22°S 121.24°W | 64.61 | 1970 | Lucretius (circa 95-55 B.C.) | WGPSN |
| Ludwig | 7.72°S 97.45°E | 23.29 | 1973 | Carl Friedrich Wilhelm Ludwig (1816–1895) | WGPSN |
| Lundmark | 38.87°S 152.56°E | 103.44 | 1970 | Knut Emil Lundmark (1889–1958) | WGPSN |
| Luther | 33.2°N 24.15°E | 9.29 | 1935 | Robert Luther (1822–1900) | WGPSN |
| Lyapunov | 26.43°N 89.36°E | 67.58 | 1964 | Aleksandr Mikhailovich Lyapunov (1857–1918) | WGPSN |
| Lyell | 13.63°N 40.56°E | 31.17 | 1935 | Sir Charles Lyell (1797–1875) | WGPSN |
| Lyman | 64.96°S 162.47°E | 83.25 | 1970 | Theodore Lyman (1874–1954) | WGPSN |
| Lyot | 50.47°S 84.8°E | 150.6 | 1964 | Bernard Ferdinand Lyot (1897–1952) | WGPSN |

back to top

== M ==
| Crater | Coordinates | Diameter (km) | Approval Year | Eponym | Ref |
|---|---|---|---|---|---|
| M. Anderson | 41.21°S 148.99°W | 16.94 | 2006 | Michael P. Anderson (1959–2003) | WGPSN |
| Mach | 18.13°N 149.24°W | 174.97 | 1970 | Ernst Mach (1838–1916) | WGPSN |
| Maclaurin | 1.92°S 67.99°E | 54.33 | 1935 | Colin Maclaurin (1698–1746) | WGPSN |
| Maclear | 10.52°N 20.1°E | 20.34 | 1961 | Thomas Maclear (1794–1879) | WGPSN |
| MacMillan | 24.2°N 7.85°W | 6.88 | 1976 | William Duncan MacMillan (1871–1948) | WGPSN |
| Macrobius | 21.26°N 45.97°E | 62.79 | 1935 | Ambrosius Aurelius Theodosius Macrobius (unknown; fl. circa 410) | WGPSN |
| Mädler | 11.04°S 29.76°E | 27.58 | 1935 | Johann Heinrich Mädler (1794–1874) | WGPSN |
| Maestlin | 4.9°N 40.72°W | 6.82 | 1961 | Michael Maestlin (1550–1631) | WGPSN |
| Magelhaens | 11.98°S 44.07°E | 37.2 | 1935 | Ferdinand Magellan (1480–1521) | WGPSN |
| Magelhaens A | 12.73°S 44.99°E | 29.35 | 2006 | Ferdinand Magellan (1480–1521) | WGPSN |
| Maginus | 50.03°S 5.98°W | 155.58 | 1935 | Giovanni Antonio Magini (1555–1617) | WGPSN |
| Main | 80.87°N 10.41°E | 47.43 | 1935 | Robert Main (1808–1878) | WGPSN |
| Mairan | 41.6°N 43.5°W | 39.49 | 1935 | Jean Jacques d'Ortous de Mairan (1678–1771) | WGPSN |
| Maksutov | 40.75°S 168.65°W | 83.84 | 1970 | Dmitri Dmitrievich Maksutov (1896–1964) | WGPSN |
| Malapert | 85°S 11.4°E | 72.38 | 1935 | Charles Malapert (1581–1630) | WGPSN |
| Malinkin | 87.22°S 75.94°E | 8.28 | 2014 | Egor Ivanovich Malinkin (1923–2008) | WGPSN |
| Mallet | 45.41°S 54.05°E | 58.92 | 1935 | Robert Mallet (1810–1881) | WGPSN |
| Malyy | 22.03°N 105.56°E | 41.29 | 1970 | Aleksandr L. Malyy (1907–1961) | WGPSN |
| Mandelʹshtam | 5.7°N 162.39°E | 181.89 | 1970 | Leonid Isaakovich Mandelʹshtam (1879–1944) | WGPSN |
| Manilius | 14.45°N 9.07°E | 38.34 | 1935 | Marcus Manilius (unknown; circa 50 B.C.) | WGPSN |
| Manners | 4.57°N 19.99°E | 15.05 | 1935 | Russell Henry Manners (1800–1870) | WGPSN |
| Manuel | 24.47°N 11.36°E | 0.57 | 1976 | (Spanish male name) | WGPSN |
| Manzinus | 67.51°S 26.37°E | 95.97 | 1935 | Carlo Antonio Manzini (1599–1677) | WGPSN |
| Maraldi | 19.36°N 34.8°E | 39.62 | 1935 | Giovanni Domenico Maraldi (1709–1788) and Jacques Philippe Maraldi (1665–1729) | WGPSN |
| Marci | 22.23°N 167.57°W | 24.47 | 1970 | Jan Marek Marci von Kronland (1595–1667) | WGPSN |
| Marco Polo | 15.52°N 2.05°W | 28.25 | 1961 | Marco Polo (1254–1324) | WGPSN |
| Marconi | 9.48°S 145.2°E | 72.88 | 1970 | Guglielmo Marconi (1874–1937) | WGPSN |
| Mareta | 36.45°N 40.81°W | 0.15 | 2025 | English feminine given name | WGPSN |
| Marinus | 39.38°S 76.57°E | 56.55 | 1935 | Marinus of Tyre (circa 70 – circa 130 A.D.) | WGPSN |
| Mariotte | 28.46°S 139.06°W | 70.27 | 1970 | Edme Mariotte (1620–1684) | WGPSN |
| Marius | 11.9°N 50.84°W | 40.09 | 1935 | Simon Marius (1570–1624) | WGPSN |
| Markov | 53.43°N 62.84°W | 39.92 | 1964 | Aleksandr Vladimirovich Markov (astronomer) (1897–1968) and Andrei Andreevich Markov (1856–1922) | WGPSN |
| Marth | 31.16°S 29.35°W | 6.54 | 1935 | Albert Marth (1828–1897) | WGPSN |
| Mary | 18.93°N 27.39°E | 0.53 | 1976 | (English form of Hebrew female name) | WGPSN |
| Maskelyne | 2.16°N 30.04°E | 22.42 | 1935 | Nevil Maskelyne (1732–1811) | WGPSN |
| Mason | 42.7°N 30.51°E | 33.33 | 1935 | Charles Mason (1730–1787) | WGPSN |
| Maunder | 14.52°S 93.88°W | 53.8 | 1970 | Annie Scott Dill Maunder (née Russell) (1868–1947) and Edward Walter Maunder (1851–1928) | WGPSN |
| Maupertuis | 49.7°N 27.28°W | 45.49 | 1935 | Pierre Louis de Maupertuis (1698–1759) | WGPSN |
| Maurolycus | 41.77°S 13.92°E | 115.35 | 1935 | Francesco Maurolico (1494–1575) | WGPSN |
| Maury | 37.11°N 39.69°E | 16.58 | 1935 | Matthew Fontaine Maury (1806–1873) and Antonia Caetana Maury (1866–1952) | WGPSN |
| Mavis | 29.76°N 26.36°W | 1.09 | 1976 | (Scottish female name) | WGPSN |
| Maxwell | 29.9°N 98.53°E | 109.24 | 1961 | James Clerk Maxwell (1831–1879) | WGPSN |
| McAdie | 2.11°N 92.22°E | 41 | 1973 | Alexander George McAdie (1863–1943) | WGPSN |
| McAuliffe | 33.24°S 149.77°W | 19.11 | 1988 | Christa McAuliffe (1948–1986) | WGPSN |
| McClure | 15.32°S 50.24°E | 23.96 | 1935 | Robert Le Mesurier McClure (1807–1873) | WGPSN |
| McCool | 41.28°S 146.26°W | 20.47 | 2006 | William Cameron McCool (1961–2003) | WGPSN |
| McDonald | 30.39°N 20.88°W | 6.97 | 1973 | William Johnson McDonald (1844–1926) and Thomas Logie McDonald (1901–1973) | WGPSN |
| McGetchin | 1.35°N 67.18°W | 0.20 | 2026 | Thomas R. McGetchin (1936–1979) | WGPSN |
| McKellar | 15.72°S 170.86°W | 50.16 | 1970 | Andrew McKellar (1910–1960) | WGPSN |
| McLaughlin | 47.01°N 92.83°W | 75.29 | 1970 | Dean Benjamin McLaughlin (1901–1965) | WGPSN |
| McMath | 16.63°N 166.09°W | 88.58 | 1970 | Francis Charles McMath (1867–1938) and Robert Raynolds McMath (1891–1962) | WGPSN |
| McNair | 35.93°S 147.95°W | 32.02 | 1988 | Ronald Erwin McNair (1950–1986) | WGPSN |
| McNally | 22.5°N 127.65°W | 47.03 | 1970 | Paul A. McNally (1890–1955) | WGPSN |
| Mechnikov | 10.47°S 148.99°W | 58.83 | 1970 | Ilʹya Ilʹich Mechnikov (1845–1916) | WGPSN |
| Mee | 43.63°S 35.19°W | 134.11 | 1935 | Arthur Butler Phillips Mee (1860–1926) | WGPSN |
| Mees | 13.57°N 96.18°W | 51.55 | 1970 | Charles Edward Kenneth Mees (1882–1960) | WGPSN |
| Meggers | 24.3°N 122.94°E | 51.16 | 1970 | William F. Meggers (1888–1968) | WGPSN |
| Meitner | 10.87°S 113.1°E | 87.27 | 1970 | Lise Meitner (1878–1968) | WGPSN |
| Melissa | 8.12°N 121.78°E | 17.21 | 1979 | (Greek female name) | WGPSN |
| Mendel | 48.83°S 109.86°W | 139.65 | 1970 | Gregor Mendel (1822–1884) | WGPSN |
| Mendeleev | 5.38°N 141.17°E | 325.13 | 1961 | Dmitry Mendeleev (1834–1907) | WGPSN |
| Menelaus | 16.26°N 15.93°E | 27.13 | 1935 | Menelaus of Alexandria (circa A.D. 98) | WGPSN |
| Menzel | 3.41°N 36.94°E | 3.44 | 1979 | Donald Howard Menzel (1901–1976) | WGPSN |
| Mercator | 29.25°S 26.11°W | 46.32 | 1935 | Gerardus Mercator (1512–1594) | WGPSN |
| Mercurius | 46.66°N 66.07°E | 64.3 | 1935 | Mercury | WGPSN |
| Merrill | 74.83°N 117.45°W | 56.99 | 1970 | Paul Merrill (1887–1961) | WGPSN |
| Mersenius | 21.49°S 49.34°W | 84.46 | 1935 | Marin Mersenne (1588–1648) | WGPSN |
| Meshcherskiy | 12.11°N 125.53°E | 65.94 | 1970 | Ivan Vsevolodovich Meshcherskiy (1859–1935) | WGPSN |
| Messala | 39.31°N 60.06°E | 122.4 | 1935 | Mashallah ibn Athari (unknown; circa 815) | WGPSN |
| Messier | 1.9°S 47.65°E | 13.8 | 1935 | Charles Messier (1730–1817) | WGPSN |
| Metius | 40.42°S 43.37°E | 83.81 | 1935 | Adriaan Adriaanszoon (known as Metius) (1571–1635) | WGPSN |
| Meton | 73.57°N 19.63°E | 124.7 | 1935 | Meton (unknown; fl. 432 B.C.) | WGPSN |
| Mezentsev | 71.77°N 129.64°W | 84.51 | 1970 | Yurij B. Mezentsev (1929–1965) | WGPSN |
| Michael | 25.05°N 0.21°E | 3.46 | 1976 | (English male name) | WGPSN |
| Michelson | 6.72°N 121.55°W | 123.14 | 1970 | Albert A. Michelson (1852–1931) | WGPSN |
| Milankovič | 76.53°N 171.35°E | 94.21 | 1970 | Milutin Milanković (1879–1958) | WGPSN |
| Milichius | 10.01°N 30.23°W | 12.19 | 1935 | Jacob Milich (1501–1559) | WGPSN |
| Miller | 39.37°S 0.78°E | 61.37 | 1935 | William Allen Miller (1817–1870) | WGPSN |
| Millikan | 46.76°N 121.52°E | 93.97 | 1970 | Robert Millikan (1868–1953) | WGPSN |
| Mills | 8.54°N 155.74°E | 35.65 | 1970 | Mark Muir Mills (1917–1958) | WGPSN |
| Milne | 31°S 112.78°E | 259.97 | 1970 | E. Arthur Milne (1896–1950) | WGPSN |
| Mineur | 24.67°N 161.73°W | 72.28 | 1970 | Henri Mineur (1899–1954) | WGPSN |
| Minkowski | 56.13°S 145.8°W | 107.51 | 1970 | Hermann Minkowski (1864–1909) and Rudolph Minkowski (1895–1976) | WGPSN |
| Minnaert | 67.54°S 178.57°E | 137.31 | 1970 | Marcel Minnaert (1893–1970) | WGPSN |
| Mitchell | 49.77°N 20.17°E | 32.15 | 1935 | Maria Mitchell (1818–1889) | WGPSN |
| Mitra | 17.76°N 154.65°W | 97.1 | 1970 | Sisir Kumar Mitra (1890–1963) | WGPSN |
| Möbius | 15.63°N 101.13°E | 48.96 | 1970 | August Möbius (1790–1868) | WGPSN |
| Mohorovičić | 18.73°S 164.83°W | 49.97 | 1970 | Andrija Mohorovičić (1857–1936) | WGPSN |
| Moigno | 66.27°N 28.8°E | 36.83 | 1935 | François Napoléon Marie Moigno (1804–1884) | WGPSN |
| Moiseev | 9.44°N 103.26°E | 61.56 | 1970 | Nikolai Dmitrievich Moiseev | WGPSN |
| Moissan | 4.77°N 137.45°E | 22.45 | 1976 | Henri Moissan (1902–1955) | WGPSN |
| Moltke | 0.59°S 24.16°E | 6.15 | 1935 | Helmuth Karl Bernhard von Moltke (1800–1891) | WGPSN |
| Monge | 19.24°S 47.54°E | 36.6 | 1935 | Gaspard Monge (1746–1818) | WGPSN |
| Monira | 12.54°S 1.73°W | 1.07 | 1976 | (Arabic female name) | WGPSN |
| Montanari | 45.83°S 20.76°W | 77.05 | 1935 | Geminiano Montanari (1633–1687) | WGPSN |
| Montgolfier | 47.06°N 160.08°W | 83.71 | 1970 | Montgolfier brothers (Jacques E.: 1745–1799, Joseph M.: 1740–1810 | WGPSN |
| Moore | 37.25°N 177.55°W | 52.66 | 1970 | Joseph Haines Moore (1878–1949) | WGPSN |
| Moretus | 70.63°S 5.95°W | 114.45 | 1935 | Theodorus Moretus (1602–1667) | WGPSN |
| Morley | 2.82°S 64.62°E | 13.71 | 1976 | Edward W. Morley (1838–1923) | WGPSN |
| Morozov | 4.62°N 127.33°E | 41.01 | 1970 | Nikolai Alexandrovich Morozov (1854–1945) | WGPSN |
| Morse | 21.9°N 175.29°W | 72.77 | 1970 | Samuel Finley Breese Morse (1791–1872) | WGPSN |
| Moseley | 20.95°N 90.2°W | 88.89 | 1964 | Henry Gwyn Jeffreys Moseley (1887–1915) | WGPSN |
| Mösting | 0.7°S 5.88°W | 24.38 | 1935 | Johan Sigismund von Mösting (1759–1843) | WGPSN |
| Mouchez | 78.38°N 26.82°W | 82.78 | 1935 | Amédée Ernest Barthélemy Mouchez (1821–1892) | WGPSN |
| Moulton | 60.91°S 97.57°E | 54.7 | 1970 | Forest Ray Moulton (1872–1952) | WGPSN |
| Müller | 7.64°S 2.04°E | 23.4 | 1935 | Karl Müller (1866–1942) | WGPSN |
| Murakami | 23.38°S 140.97°W | 44.52 | 1991 | Harutaro Murakami (1872–1947) | WGPSN |
| Murchison | 5.07°N 0.21°W | 57.83 | 1935 | Roderick Impey Murchison (1792–1871) | WGPSN |
| Mutus | 63.65°S 29.93°E | 76.33 | 1935 | Vicente Mut Armengol, also Mut i Armengol (circa 1614–1687) | WGPSN |

back to top

== N ==
| Crater | Coordinates | Diameter (km) | Approval Year | Eponym | Ref |
|---|---|---|---|---|---|
| Nagaoka | 19.51°N 154.05°E | 50.54 | 1970 | Hantaro Nagaoka (1865–1940) | WGPSN |
| Nansen | 81.17°N 95.38°E | 116.9 | 1964 | Fridtjof Nansen (1861–1930) | WGPSN |
| Naonobu | 4.7°S 57.93°E | 32.96 | 1976 | Naonobu Ajima (c. 1732–1798) | WGPSN |
| Nasireddin | 41.04°S 0.14°E | 51.99 | 1935 | Nasir al-Din al-Tusi (1201–1274) | WGPSN |
| Nasmyth | 50.49°S 56.39°W | 78.37 | 1935 | James Nasmyth (1808–1890) | WGPSN |
| Nassau | 24.91°S 177.34°E | 75.8 | 1970 | Jason John Nassau (1893–1965) | WGPSN |
| Natasha | 19.98°N 31.16°W | 10.98 | 1976 | (Russian female name) | WGPSN |
| Naumann | 35.38°N 62.02°W | 9.93 | 1935 | Karl Friedrich Naumann (1797–1873) | WGPSN |
| Neander | 31.35°S 39.88°E | 49.22 | 1935 | Michael Neander (1529–1581) | WGPSN |
| Nearch | 58.58°S 39.01°E | 72.79 | 1935 | Nearchus (unknown: flourished 312 B.C.) | WGPSN |
| Necho | 5.25°S 123.24°E | 36.87 | 1976 | Necho II (610-593 B.C.) | WGPSN |
| Nefedʹev | 81.07°S 135.77°E | 52.94 | 2009 | Anatoly Nefedʹev (1910–1976) | WGPSN |
| Neison | 68.21°N 25.02°E | 51.03 | 1935 | Edmund Neville Neison (1849–1940) | WGPSN |
| Neper | 8.76°N 84.58°E | 144.32 | 1935 | John Napier (1550–1617) | WGPSN |
| Nernst | 35.57°N 94.64°W | 121.52 | 1970 | Walther Hermann Nernst (1864–1941) | WGPSN |
| Neujmin | 26.68°S 125.17°E | 97.03 | 1970 | Grigorij N. Neujmin (1885–1946) | WGPSN |
| Neumayer | 71.16°S 70.92°E | 84.38 | 1935 | Georg von Neumayer (1826–1909) | WGPSN |
| Newcomb | 29.76°N 43.67°E | 39.8 | 1935 | Simon Newcomb (1835–1909) | WGPSN |
| Newton | 76.52°S 17.44°W | 83.85 | 1935 | Isaac Newton (1643–1727) | WGPSN |
| Nicholson | 26.22°S 85.21°W | 38.08 | 1970 | Seth Barnes Nicholson (1891–1963) | WGPSN |
| Nicolai | 42.47°S 25.87°E | 40.54 | 1935 | Friedrich Bernhard Gottfried Nicolai (1793–1846) | WGPSN |
| Nicollet | 21.95°S 12.5°W | 14.73 | 1935 | Jean Nicholas Nicollet (1788–1843) | WGPSN |
| Nielsen | 31.8°N 51.76°W | 9.64 | 1973 | Axel V. Nielsen (1902–1970) and Harald Herborg Nielsen (1903–1973) | WGPSN |
| Niepce | 72.2°N 120.15°W | 59.69 | 1970 | Nicéphore Niépce (1765–1833) | WGPSN |
| Nijland | 33.19°N 134.17°E | 35.46 | 1970 | Albertus Antonie Nijland (1868–1936) | WGPSN |
| Nikolaev | 35.08°N 151.28°E | 42.67 | 1970 | Andriyan G. Nikolayev (1929–2004) | WGPSN |
| Nikolya | 38.3°N 35°W | 0.1 | 2012 | Russian male name | WGPSN |
| Nishina | 44.57°S 170.8°W | 62.13 | 1970 | Yoshio Nishina (1890–1951) | WGPSN |
| Nobel | 14.73°N 101.39°W | 50.87 | 1970 | Alfred B. Nobel (1833–1896) | WGPSN |
| Nobile | 85.28°S 53.27°E | 79.27 | 1994 | Umberto Nobile (1885–1978) | WGPSN |
| Nobili | 0.17°N 75.95°E | 41.79 | 1976 | Leopoldo Nobili (1784–1835) | WGPSN |
| Nöggerath | 48.82°S 45.84°W | 32.12 | 1935 | Johann Jakob Nöggerath (1788–1877) | WGPSN |
| Nonius | 34.9°S 3.79°E | 70.61 | 1935 | Pedro Nunes (Petrus Nonius Salaciencis) (1502–1578) | WGPSN |
| Norman | 11.78°S 30.35°W | 9.87 | 1976 | Robert Norman (unknown: flourished circa 1590) | WGPSN |
| Nöther | 66.35°N 114.18°W | 64.8 | 1970 | Emmy Noether (1882–1935) | WGPSN |
| Numerov | 70.52°S 162.2°W | 105.39 | 1970 | Boris Vasilʹevich Numerov (1891–1941) | WGPSN |
| Nunn | 4.62°N 91.15°E | 18.49 | 1973 | Joseph Nunn (1905–1968) | WGPSN |
| Nušl | 32.19°N 167.45°E | 60.58 | 1970 | František Nušl (1867–1925) | WGPSN |

back to top
