= Outline of the Moon =

Overview of and topical guide to the Moon

The following outline is provided as an overview of and topical guide to the Moon:

Moon – Earth's only permanent natural satellite. It is one of the largest natural satellites in the Solar System, and the largest among planetary satellites relative to the size of the planet that it orbits (its primary). It is the second-densest satellite among those whose densities are known (after Jupiter's satellite Io).

== Classification of the Moon ==
The Moon can be described as all of the following:

- Natural satellite – celestial body that orbits another celestial body of greater mass (e.g. a planet, star, or dwarf planet), called its primary. For example, the Moon is a natural satellite of Earth, and Earth is a natural satellite of the Sun.

== Characteristics of the Moon ==
- Atmosphere of the Moon
- Exploration of the Moon
- Geology of the Moon
  - Internal structure of the Moon
  - Lunar soil
  - Lunar water
  - Geological periods
    - Pre-Nectarian
    - Nectarian
    - Imbrian
    - Eratosthenian
    - Copernician
- Gravitation of the Moon
- Magnetic field of the Moon
- Moonlight
  - Ray system of the Moon
- Sodium tail of the Moon
- Space weathering
- Topography of the Moon
- Transient lunar phenomenon

== Selenography of the Moon ==
Selenography – study of the surface and physical features of the Moon. Historically, the principal concern of selenographists was the mapping and naming of the lunar maria, craters, mountain ranges, and other various features. This task was largely finished when high resolution images of the near and far sides of the Moon were obtained by orbiting spacecraft during the early space era. Nevertheless, some regions of the Moon remain poorly imaged (especially near the poles) and the exact locations of many features (like crater depths) are uncertain by several kilometers.

- Face on the Moon
- Near side of the Moon
- Far side of the Moon

=== Geographical features on the Moon ===
Features on the Moon

- List of lunar features
- Caldera on the Moon
- Lunar craters
  - List of craters on the Moon, A-B
  - List of craters on the Moon, C-F
  - List of craters on the Moon, G-K
  - List of craters on the Moon, L-N
  - List of craters on the Moon, O-Q
  - List of craters on the Moon, R-S
  - List of craters on the Moon, T-Z
  - Permanently shadowed craters
- Lunar mare
  - List of maria on the Moon
- List of mountains on the Moon
  - Peak of eternal light
- List of valleys on the Moon
- Volcanic features of the Moon
- Lunar swirls
- List of quadrangles on the Moon
- Lunar poles
  - Lunar north pole
  - Lunar south pole
    - Shackleton (crater)
    - South Pole–Aitken basin

== Appearance and motion of the Moon ==
- Orbit of the Moon
- Lunar phase
- Kordylewski clouds

== History ==
- Lunar geologic timescale
- Giant impact hypothesis
- Late Heavy Bombardment

== Exploration of the Moon ==
- Apollo program
- Exploration of the Moon
- Colonization of the Moon
- List of lunar probes
- List of missions to the Moon
  - proposed
- Moon landing
  - conspiracy theories
- List of man-made objects on the Moon
- List of current and future lunar missions
- Zond program

== Flyby and direct lunar missions ==
- Luna programme
  - Luna 1
  - Luna 2
  - Luna 3
  - Luna 5
  - Luna 6
  - Luna 7
  - Luna 8
  - Luna 9
  - Luna 10
  - Luna 11
  - Luna 12
  - Luna 13
  - Luna 14
  - Luna 15
  - Luna 16
  - Luna 17
  - Luna 18
  - Luna 19
  - Luna 20
  - Luna 21
  - Luna 22
  - Luna 23
  - Luna 24
- Luna-Glob
  - Luna 25
- Pioneer program
  - Pioneer 4
- Ranger program
  - Ranger 4
  - Ranger 5
  - Ranger 6
  - Ranger 7
  - Ranger 8
  - Ranger 9
- Zond program
  - Zond 3
  - Zond 4
  - Zond 5
  - Zond 6
  - Zond 7
  - Zond 8
- Surveyor Program
  - Surveyor 2
  - Surveyor 3
  - Surveyor 4
  - Surveyor 5
  - Surveyor 6
  - Surveyor 7
- Lunar Orbiter program
  - Lunar Orbiter 1
  - Lunar Orbiter 2
  - Lunar Orbiter 3
  - Lunar Orbiter 4
  - Lunar Orbiter 5
- Apollo program
  - Apollo 8
  - Apollo 10
  - Apollo 11
  - Apollo 12
  - Apollo 13
  - Apollo 14
  - Apollo 15
  - Apollo 16
  - Apollo 17
- Explorer 35
- Explorer 49
- Lunokhod programme
  - Lunokhod 1
  - Lunokhod 2
- Mariner program
  - Mariner 10
- International Cometary Explorer
- Hiten
- GEOTAIL
- Clementine
- PAS-22
- Lunar Prospector
- Nozomi
- SMART-1
- SELENE
- Chinese Lunar Exploration Program
  - Chang'e 1
  - Chang'e 2
  - Chang'e 3
  - Chang'e 4
  - Chang'e 5
  - Chang'e 6
- Chandrayaan programme
  - Chandrayaan-1
  - Chandrayaan-2
  - Chandrayaan-3
- Moon Impact Probe
- Lunar Precursor Robotic Program
  - Lunar Reconnaissance Orbiter
  - LCROSS
  - Lunar Atmosphere and Dust Environment Explorer (LADEE)
- ARTEMIS (THEMIS)
- Artemis program
  - Artemis I
  - Artemis II
- Gravity Recovery and Interior Laboratory (GRAIL)
- DRO A/B
- Queqiao relay satellites
  - Queqiao-1
  - Queqiao-2
- Tiandu 1 and 2

== Proposed lunar missions ==
- Google Lunar X Prize
- Moon Express
- Astrobotic Technology
- Chang'e 7
- Chandrayaan-4
- Luna-Glob
- Artemis IV
- Artemis V
- Colonization of the Moon

== See also ==
- Outline of space science
  - Outline of astronomy
  - Outline of space exploration
- Lunar basalt 70017
- Lunar calendar
- Lunisolar calendar
- Craters named after people
- Double planet
- Lunar effect
- Man in the Moon
- Memorials on the Moon
- Month
- Lunar month
- Moon illusion
  - Harvest moon
  - Hunter's moon
- Moon in art and literature
- Moon in mythology
  - Hjúki and Bil (Norse legends)
- Moon is made of green cheese
- Natural satellite
- Solar System
- Supermoon
- Theia
- Tourism
