= Taiwei =

Taiwei may refer to:

- Grand Commandant, a military commander title in East Asian history
- Taiwei, a town in Wuyang County, Henan, China
- Tai Wei, a crater on the Moon
