= Leucippus (disambiguation) =

Leucippus may refer to:

- Leucippus, a Greek philosopher
- Leucippus (mythology), several figures in Greek mythology.
- Leucippus (bird), a hummingbird genus
- Leucippus (crater)
- Leukippos asteroid
