= Theiner =

Theiner is a German surname. Notable people with the surname include:

- Augustin Theiner (1804–1874), German theologian and historian
- Wojciech Theiner (born 1986), Polish high jumper

== See also ==
- Theiler
