= List of craters on the Moon: O–Q =

The list of approved names in the Gazetteer of Planetary Nomenclature maintained by the International Astronomical Union includes the diameter of the crater and the person the crater is named for. Where a crater formation has associated satellite craters, these are detailed on the main crater description pages.

List of craters on the Moon

- A
- B
- C
- D
- E
- F
- G
- H
- I
- J
- K
- L
- M
- N
- O
- P
- Q
- R
- S
- T
- U
- V
- W
- X
- Y
- Z

== O ==
Crater	Coordinates	Diameter (km)	Approval Year	Eponym	Ref
Oberbeck	83.55°S 68.14°E	58.00	2026	Verne R. Oberbeck (1936–2018)	WGPSN
Oberth	62.49°N 154.84°E	49.52	1997	Hermann Oberth (1894–1989)	WGPSN
Obruchev	38.67°S 162.43°E	72.23	1970	Vladimir Afanasyevich Obruchev (1863–1956)	WGPSN
O'Day	30.42°S 157.29°E	70.41	1970	Marcus O'Day (1897–1961)	WGPSN
Oenopides	57.13°N 64.2°W	73.47	1935	Oenopides of Chios (c. 500–430 BC)	WGPSN
Oersted	43.09°N 47.25°E	42.28	1935	Hans Christian Ørsted (1777–1851)	WGPSN
Ohm	18.32°N 113.78°W	61.75	1970	Georg Simon Ohm (1789–1854)	WGPSN
Oken	43.76°S 76.09°E	78.67	1935	Lorenz Ockenfuss (1779–1851)	WGPSN
Olbers	7.3°N 76.14°W	73.02	1935	Heinrich Wilhelm Matthäus Olbers (1758–1840)	WGPSN
Olcott	20.57°N 117.79°E	79.94	1970	William Tyler Olcott (1873–1936)	WGPSN
Olivier	58.72°N 138.44°E	78.45	1979	Charles Pollard Olivier (1884–1975)	WGPSN
Omar Khayyam	58.21°N 102.22°W	68.64	1970	Omar Khayyám (c. 1050–1123)	WGPSN
Onizuka	36.38°S 149.79°W	26.88	1988	Ellison Shoji Onizuka (1946–1986)	WGPSN
Opelt	16.32°S 17.64°W	48.73	1935	Friedrich Wilhelm Opelt (1794–1863)	WGPSN
Oppenheimer	35.32°S 166.03°W	201.16	1970	J. Robert Oppenheimer (1904–1967)	WGPSN
Oppolzer	1.52°S 0.45°W	40.87	1935	Theodor von Oppolzer (1841–1886)	WGPSN
Oresme	42.61°S 169.22°E	82.05	1970	Nicole Oresme (c. 1323–1382)	WGPSN
Orlov	25.77°S 175.08°W	72.93	1970	Aleksandr Yakovlevich Orlov (1880–1954) and Sergei Vladimirovich Orlov (1880–1958)	WGPSN
Orontius	40.37°S 3.96°W	121.02	1935	Oronce Finé (1494–1555)	WGPSN
Osama	18.61°N 5.27°E	0.42	1976	(Arabic male name)	WGPSN
Osiris	18.65°N 27.65°E	0.96	1976	Osiris (Egyptian deity)	WGPSN
Osman	10.98°S 6.25°W	1.79	1976	(Turkish male name)	WGPSN
Ostwald	10.24°N 121.95°E	108.13	1970	Wilhelm Ostwald (1853–1932)	WGPSN

back to top

== P ==
Crater	Coordinates	Diameter (km)	Approval Year	Eponym	Ref
Palisa	9.47°S 7.19°W	33.47	1935	Johann Palisa (1848–1925)	WGPSN
Palitzsch	28.02°S 64.39°E	41.87	1935	Johann Georg Palitzsch (1723–1788)	WGPSN
Pallas	5.48°N 1.65°W	49.51	1935	Peter Simon Pallas (1741–1811)	WGPSN
Palmieri	28.64°S 47.8°W	39.84	1935	Luigi Palmieri (1807–1896)	WGPSN
Paneth	62.6°N 94.63°W	60.92	1970	Friedrich Adolf Paneth (1887–1958)	WGPSN
Pannekoek	4.2°S 140.69°E	67.5	1970	Anton Pannekoek (1873–1960)	WGPSN
Papaleksi	10.15°N 163.95°E	92.03	1970	Nikolaj Dmitrievich Papaleksi (1880–1947)	WGPSN
Paracelsus	22.92°S 163.44°E	85.88	1970	Theophrastus Bombastus von Hohenheim (1493–1541)	WGPSN
Paraskevopoulos	50.09°N 150.34°W	98.87	1970	John Stefanos Paraskevopoulos (1889–1951)	WGPSN
Parenago	25.88°N 108.91°W	94.57	1970	Pavel Petrovich Parenago (1906–1960)	WGPSN
Parkhurst	33.29°S 103.69°E	93.08	1970	John Adelbert Parkhurst (1861–1925)	WGPSN
Parrot	14.57°S 3.29°E	70.66	1935	Johann Jacob Friedrich Wilhelm Parrot (1792–1840)	WGPSN
Parry	7.88°S 15.78°W	47.28	1935	William Edward Parry (1790–1855)	WGPSN
Parsons	37.25°N 171.16°W	41.12	1970	John Whiteside Parsons (1914–1952)	WGPSN
Pascal	74.36°N 70.63°W	108.2	1964	Blaise Pascal (1623–1662)	WGPSN
Paschen	14.06°S 140.53°W	127.36	1970	Friedrich Paschen (1865–1940)	WGPSN
Pasteur	11.58°S 104.91°E	232.77	1961	Louis Pasteur (1822–1895)	WGPSN
Patricia	24.91°N 0.5°E	10.08	1976	(English female name)	WGPSN
Patsaev	16.77°S 133.6°E	55.25	1973	Viktor Ivanovich Patsayev (1933–1971)	WGPSN
Pauli	44.76°S 137.35°E	95.28	1970	Wolfgang Pauli (1900–1958)	WGPSN
Pavlov	28.28°S 142.4°E	143.05	1970	Ivan Petrovich Pavlov (1849–1936)	WGPSN
Pawsey	44.24°N 145.29°E	59.98	1970	Joseph Lade Pawsey (1908–1962)	WGPSN
Peary	88.63°N 24.4°E	78.75	1964	Robert Edwin Peary (1856–1920)	WGPSN
Pease	12.51°N 106.3°W	40.84	1970	Francis G. Pease (1881–1938)	WGPSN
Peek	2.76°N 86.96°E	12.55	1973	Bertrand Meigh Peek (1891–1965)	WGPSN
Peirce	18.26°N 53.35°E	18.86	1935	Benjamin Peirce (1809–1880)	WGPSN
Peirescius	46.4°S 67.8°E	61.53	1935	Nicolas-Claude Fabri de Peiresc (1580–1637)	WGPSN
Pentland	64.57°S 11.34°E	56.45	1935	Joseph Barclay Pentland (1797–1873)	WGPSN
Perelʹman	24.05°S 106.01°E	48.87	1970	Yakov I. Perelman (1882–1942)	WGPSN
Perepelkin	9.99°S 128.8°E	88.74	1970	Yevgeny Perepyolkin (1906–1938)	WGPSN
Perkin	47.02°N 175.73°W	62.48	1970	Richard Scott Perkin (1906–1969)	WGPSN
Perrine	42.11°N 127.95°W	87.41	1970	Charles Dillon Perrine (1867–1951)	WGPSN
Petavius	25.39°S 60.78°E	184.06	1935	Denis Petau (1583–1652)	WGPSN
Petermann	74.35°N 67.89°E	76.95	1935	August Heinrich Petermann (1822–1878)	WGPSN
Peters	68.07°N 29.39°E	14.67	1935	Christian August Friedrich Peters (1806–1880)	WGPSN
Petit	2.32°N 63.46°E	5.04	1976	Alexis Therese Petit (1771–1820)	WGPSN
Petrie	45.14°N 108.47°E	32.86	1970	Robert Methven Petrie (1906–1966)	WGPSN
Petropavlovskiy	36.92°N 115.28°W	64.07	1970	Boris Sergeevich Petropavlovskiy (1898–1933)	WGPSN
Petrov	61.36°S 88.18°E	55.44	1970	Evgenij S. Petrov (1900–1942)	WGPSN
Pettit	27.52°S 86.75°W	36.67	1970	Edison Pettit (1889–1962)	WGPSN
Petzval	62.73°S 110.83°W	93.47	1970	Joseph von Petzval (1807–1891)	WGPSN
Phillips	26.57°S 75.67°E	104.21	1935	John Phillips (1800–1874)	WGPSN
Philolaus	72.22°N 32.88°W	71.44	1935	Philolaus of Croton (flourished 400 BC)	WGPSN
Phocylides	52.79°S 57.31°W	115.18	1935	Johannes Phocylides Holwarda (Jan Fokker) (1618–1651)	WGPSN
Piazzi	36.16°S 68.01°W	102.57	1935	Giuseppe Piazzi (1746–1826)	WGPSN
Piazzi Smyth	41.91°N 3.24°W	12.96	1935	Charles Piazzi Smyth (1819–1900)	WGPSN
Picard	14.57°N 54.72°E	22.35	1935	Jean-Felix Picard (1620–1682)	WGPSN
Piccolomini	29.7°S 32.2°E	87.58	1935	Alessandro Piccolomini (1508–1578)	WGPSN
Pickering	2.88°S 6.99°E	15.4	1935	Edward Charles Pickering (1846–1919) and William Henry Pickering (1858–1938)	WGPSN
Pictet	43.56°S 7.49°W	59.95	1935	Marc-Auguste Pictet-Turretin (1752–1825)	WGPSN
Pierazzo	3.3°N 100.24°W	9.29	2015	Elisabetta Pierazzo (1963–2011)	WGPSN
Pikelʹner	48.37°S 124.25°E	40.96	1979	Solomon Borisovich Pikelner (1921–1975)	WGPSN
Pilâtre	60.17°S 86.7°W	64.37	1991	Jean-François Pilâtre de Rozier (1756–1785)	WGPSN
Pingré	58.64°S 73.95°W	88.43	1961	Alexandre Guy Pingré (1711–1796)	WGPSN
Pirquet	20.34°S 139.93°E	62.14	1970	Baron Guido von Pirquet (1880–1966)	WGPSN
Pitatus	29.88°S 13.53°W	100.63	1935	Pietro Pitati (flourished c. 1500)	WGPSN
Pitiscus	50.61°S 30.57°E	79.85	1935	Bartholemaeus Pitiscus (1561–1613)	WGPSN
Pizzetti	35.06°S 119.29°E	53.47	1970	Paolo Pizzetti (1860–1918)	WGPSN
Plana	42.25°N 28.22°E	42.97	1935	Baron Giovanni Antonio Amedeo Plana (1781–1864)	WGPSN
Planck	57.27°S 135.34°E	319.46	1970	Max Karl Ernst Ludwig Planck (1858–1947)	WGPSN
Planté	10.22°S 163.26°E	36.8	1979	Gaston Planté (1834–1889)	WGPSN
Plaskett	81.63°N 176.71°E	114.34	1976	John Stanley Plaskett (1865–1941)	WGPSN
Plato	51.62°N 9.38°W	100.68	1935	Plato (c. 428–347 BC)	WGPSN
Playfair	23.56°S 8.45°E	49.88	1935	John Playfair (1748–1819)	WGPSN
Plinius	15.36°N 23.61°E	41.31	1935	Pliny the Elder (23–79)	WGPSN
Plummer	24.62°S 154.86°W	75.7	1970	Henry Crozier Keating Plummer (1875–1946)	WGPSN
Plutarch	24.18°N 79.05°E	69.59	1935	Plutarch (c. 46–120)	WGPSN
Poczobutt	57.27°N 99.23°W	212.36	1979	Martin Odlanicky Poczobutt (1728–1810)	WGPSN
Pogson	42.38°S 111.11°E	40.87	1970	Norman Robert Pogson (1829–1891)	WGPSN
Poincaré	56.86°S 163.99°E	345.99	1970	Jules Henri Poincaré (1854–1912)	WGPSN
Poinsot	78.9°N 146.21°W	65.11	1970	Louis Poinsot (1777–1859)	WGPSN
Poisson	30.34°S 10.56°E	41.4	1935	Siméon Denis Poisson (1781–1840)	WGPSN
Polybius	22.46°S 25.63°E	40.81	1935	Polybius (c. 204–122 BC)	WGPSN
Polzunov	25.57°N 115.01°E	66.53	1970	Ivan Ivanovich Polzunov (1728–1766)	WGPSN
Pomortsev	0.74°N 66.91°E	25.51	1976	Mikhail Mikhailovich Pomortsev (1851–1916)	WGPSN
Poncelet	75.91°N 54.57°W	67.57	1964	Jean-Victor Poncelet (1788–1867)	WGPSN
Pons	25.43°S 21.55°E	39.7	1935	Jean-Louis Pons (1761–1831)	WGPSN
Pontanus	28.42°S 14.36°E	55.66	1935	Giovanni Gioviani Pontano (1427–1503)	WGPSN
Pontécoulant	58.78°S 66.07°E	91.4	1935	Philippe Gustave Doulcet, Comte De Pontécoulant (1795–1874)	WGPSN
Popov	16.93°N 99.38°E	71.4	1961	Aleksander Stepanovich Popov (1859–1905) and C. Popov (1880–1966)	WGPSN
Porter	56.15°S 10.18°W	51.46	1970	Russell Williams Porter (1871–1949)	WGPSN
Posidonius	31.88°N 29.99°E	95.06	1935	Posidonius (c. 135–51 BC)	WGPSN
Poynting	17.5°N 133.38°W	127.55	1970	John Henry Poynting (1852–1914)	WGPSN
Prager	3.99°S 130.78°E	53.9	1971	Richard A. Prager (1884–1945)	WGPSN
Prandtl	59.62°S 141.54°E	87.53	1970	Ludwig Prandtl (1875–1953)	WGPSN
Priestley	56.71°S 108.47°E	54.88	1970	Joseph Priestley (1733–1804)	WGPSN
Prinz	25.49°N 44.14°W	46.13	1935	Wilhelm Prinz (1857–1910)	WGPSN
Priscilla	10.96°S 6.21°W	1.5	1976	(Latin female name)	WGPSN
Proclus	16.09°N 46.89°E	26.91	1935	Proclus Diadochus (410–485)	WGPSN
Proctor	46.43°S 5.04°W	47.64	1935	Mary Proctor (1862–1957)	WGPSN
Protagoras	56.02°N 7.34°E	21.05	1935	Protagoras (c. 481–411 BC)	WGPSN
Ptolemaeus	9.16°S 1.84°W	153.67	1935	Ptolemy (c. 87–150)	WGPSN
Puiseux	27.82°S 39.19°W	24.95	1935	Pierre Puiseux (1855–1928)	WGPSN
Pupin	23.87°N 11°W	2.17	1976	Mihajlo Idvorski Pupin (1858–1935)	WGPSN
Purbach	25.51°S 2.03°W	114.97	1935	Georg Purbach (1423–1461)	WGPSN
Purkyně	1.54°S 94.86°E	50.29	1970	Jan Evangelista Purkyně (1787–1869)	WGPSN
Pythagoras	63.68°N 62.98°W	144.55	1935	Pythagoras (flourished c. 532 BC)	WGPSN
Pytheas	20.57°N 20.59°W	18.81	1935	Pytheas (born c. 308 BC)	WGPSN

back to top

== Q ==
Crater	Coordinates	Diameter (km)	Approval Year	Eponym	Ref
Quetelet	42.66°N 135.3°W	54.77	1970	Lambert Adolphe Jacques Quételet (1796–1874)	WGPSN

back to top
