= List of craters on the Moon: T–Z =

This is a partial list of named lunar craters according to the Gazetteer of Planetary Nomenclature maintained by the International Astronomical Union includes the diameter of the crater and the person the crater is named for. Where a crater formation has associated satellite craters, these are detailed on the main crater description pages.

List of craters on the Moon

- A
- B
- C
- D
- E
- F
- G
- H
- I
- J
- K
- L
- M
- N
- O
- P
- Q
- R
- S
- T
- U
- V
- W
- X
- Y
- Z

== T ==
Crater	Coordinates	Diameter (km)	Approval Year	Eponym	Ref
T. Mayer	15.54°N 29.17°W	33.15	1935	Tobias Mayer (1723–1762)	WGPSN
Tacchini	5.08°N 85.82°E	42.58	1973	Pietro Tacchini (1838–1905)	WGPSN
Tacitus	16.2°S 18.95°E	39.81	1935	Cornelius Tacitus (c. 55–120)	WGPSN
Tacquet	16.64°N 19.2°E	6.43	1935	André Tacquet (1612–1660)	WGPSN
Tai Wei	44.15°N 19.49°W	0.48	2015	Supreme Palace enclosure (location on ancient Chinese star map)	WGPSN
Taizo	24.7°N 2.2°E	8.19	1979	Japanese male name	WGPSN
Talbot	2.47°S 85.3°E	12.36	1976	William Henry Fox Talbot (1800–1877)	WGPSN
Tamm	4.32°S 146.38°E	40.54	1979	Igor Tamm (1895–1971)	WGPSN
Tannerus	56.44°S 21.92°E	28.07	1935	Adam Tanner (1572–1632)	WGPSN
Taruntius	5.5°N 46.54°E	57.32	1935	Lucius Taruntius Firmanus (unknown–86 BC)	WGPSN
Taylor	5.28°S 16.65°E	36.35	1935	Brook Taylor (1685–1731)	WGPSN
Tebbutt	9.46°N 53.52°E	33.99	1973	John Tebbutt (1834–1916)	WGPSN
Teisserenc	31.96°N 136.28°W	62.31	1970	Léon Philippe Teisserenc de Bort (1855–1913)	WGPSN
Tempel	3.76°N 11.86°E	43.19	1935	Ernst Wilhelm Leberecht Tempel (1821–1889)	WGPSN
Ten Bruggencate	9.58°S 134.66°E	59.95	1970	Paul ten Bruggencate (1901–1961)	WGPSN
Tereshkova	28.21°N 143.84°E	31.33	1970	Valentina Tereshkova (born 1937)	WGPSN
Tesla	38.36°N 124.73°E	41.15	1970	Nikola Tesla (1856–1943)	WGPSN
Thales	61.74°N 50.27°E	30.75	1935	Thales of Miletus (c. 636–546 BC)	WGPSN
Tharp	30.6°S 145.63°E	13.45	2015	Marie Tharp (1920–1986)	WGPSN
Theaetetus	37.01°N 6.06°E	24.59	1935	Theaetetus (c. 417–c. 369 BC)	WGPSN
Thebit	22.01°S 4.02°W	54.64	1935	Thabit ibn Qurra (826–901)	WGPSN
Theiler	13.36°N 82.85°E	8.28	1979	Max Theiler (1899–1972)	WGPSN
Theon Junior	2.41°S 15.79°E	17.61	1935	Theon of Alexandria (c. 335–c. 405)	WGPSN
Theon Senior	0.81°S 15.42°E	18.02	1935	Theon of Smyrna (c. 100)	WGPSN
Theophilus	11.45°S 26.28°E	98.59	1935	Theophilus (died 412)	WGPSN
Theophrastus	17.46°N 39.06°E	8.03	1973	Theophrastus (372–287 BC)	WGPSN
Thiel	40.17°N 134.56°W	35.67	1970	Walter Thiel (1910–1943)	WGPSN
Thiessen	74.86°N 169.5°W	66.39	1970	Georg Heinrich Thiessen (1914–1961)	WGPSN
Thomson	32.32°S 166.04°E	117.25	1970	J. J. Thomson (1856–1940)	WGPSN
Tian Shi	44.1°N 19.45°W	0.47	2015	Heavenly Market enclosure (location on ancient Chinese star map)	WGPSN
Tikhomirov	24.2°N 161.33°E	86.43	1970	Nikolaj Ivanovich Tikhomirov (1860–1930)	WGPSN
Tikhov	61.66°N 172.29°E	83.97	1970	Gavriil Adrianovich Tikhov (1875–1960)	WGPSN
Tiling	52.85°S 133.11°W	38.23	1970	Reinhold Tiling (1890–1933)	WGPSN
Timaeus	62.91°N 0.55°W	32.81	1935	Timaeus (c. 400 BC)	WGPSN
Timiryazev	5.09°S 147.15°W	52.15	1970	Kliment Arkadyevich Timiryazev (1843–1920)	WGPSN
Timocharis	26.72°N 13.1°W	34.14	1935	Timocharis (flourished c. 280 BC)	WGPSN
Tiselius	6.89°N 176.7°E	53.75	1979	Arne Wilhelm Kaurin Tiselius (1902–1971)	WGPSN
Tisserand	21.41°N 48.17°E	34.63	1935	François Félix Tisserand (1845–1896)	WGPSN
Titius	26.75°S 100.66°E	68.42	1970	Johann Daniel Titius (1729–1796)	WGPSN
Titov	28.55°N 150.29°E	29.61	1970	Gherman Titov (1935–2000)	WGPSN
Tolansky	9.52°S 15.98°W	13.03	1976	Samuel Tolansky (1907–1973)	WGPSN
Tooley	87.93°N 54.43°E	7	2020	Craig Tooley (1960–2017)	WGPSN
Torricelli	4.72°S 28.4°E	30.87	1935	Evangelista Torricelli (1608–1647)	WGPSN
Toscanelli	27.96°N 47.61°W	7.05	1976	Paolo Dal Pozzo Toscanelli (1397–1482)	WGPSN
Townley	3.42°N 63.19°E	17.68	1976	Sidney Dean Townley (1867–1946)	WGPSN
Tralles	28.32°N 52.85°E	44.16	1935	Johann Georg Tralles (1763–1822)	WGPSN
Triesnecker	4.18°N 3.6°E	24.97	1935	Franz de Paula Triesnecker (1745–1817)	WGPSN
Trouvelot	49.37°N 5.79°E	8.5	1935	Étienne Léopold Trouvelot (1827–1895)	WGPSN
Trumpler	29.33°N 167.14°E	76.17	1970	Robert Julius Trumpler (1866–1956)	WGPSN
Tsander	5.39°N 149.69°W	159.95	1970	Friedrich Arturowitsch Zander (1887–1933)	WGPSN
Tseraskiy	48.66°S 142.64°E	65.59	1970	Vitolʹd Karlovic Tseraskiy (Ceraski) (1849–1925)	WGPSN
Tsinger	56.54°N 175.71°E	44.21	1970	Nikolaj Yakovlevich Tsinger (Zinger) (1842–1918)	WGPSN
Tsiolkovskiy	20.38°S 128.97°E	184.39	1961	Konstantin Eduardovich Tsiolkovsky (1857–1935)	WGPSN
Tsu Chung-Chi	17.16°N 145.16°E	28.53	1961	Zu Chongzhi (429–500)	WGPSN
Tucker	5.62°S 88.21°E	6.78	1979	Richard Hawley Tucker (1859–1952)	WGPSN
Turner	1.4°S 13.24°W	11.22	1935	Herbert Hall Turner (1861–1930)	WGPSN
Tycho	43.3°S 11.22°W	85.29	1935	Tycho Brahe (1546–1601)	WGPSN
Tyndall	35.2°S 117.64°E	20.94	1970	John Tyndall (1820–1893)	WGPSN

back to top

== U ==
Crater	Coordinates	Diameter (km)	Approval Year	Eponym	Ref
Ukert	7.71°N 1.37°E	21.71	1935	Friedrich August Ukert (1780–1851)	WGPSN
Ulugh Beigh	32.67°N 81.96°W	57.04	1961	Ulugh Beg (1394–1449)	WGPSN
Urey	27.93°N 87.43°E	39.29	1985	Harold Urey (1893–1981)	WGPSN

back to top

== V ==
Crater	Coordinates	Diameter (km)	Approval Year	Eponym	Ref
Väisälä	25.9°N 47.9°W	8.12	1973	Yrjö Väisälä (1891–1971)	WGPSN
Valera	38.3°N 35°W	0.1	2012	Russian male name	WGPSN
Valier	6.65°N 174.26°E	65.06	1970	Max Valier (1895–1930)	WGPSN
van Albada	9.36°N 64.35°E	22.92	1976	Gale Bruno van Albada (1912–1972)	WGPSN
Van Biesbroeck	28.77°N 45.59°W	9.08	1976	George Van Biesbroeck (1880–1974)	WGPSN
Van de Graaff	27.04°S 172.01°E	240.47	1970	Robert Van de Graaff (1901–1967)	WGPSN
Van den Bergh	30.91°N 159.21°W	43.42	1970	George van den Bergh (1890–1966)	WGPSN
van den Bos	5.26°S 145.95°E	25.18	1979	Willem Hendrik van den Bos (1896–1974)	WGPSN
Van der Waals	43.56°S 119.98°E	113.37	1970	Johannes Van der Waals (1837–1923)	WGPSN
Van Gent	15.42°N 160.27°E	44.37	1970	Hendrik Van Gent (1900–1947)	WGPSN
Van Maanen	36.03°N 128.18°E	46.42	1970	Adriaan Van Maanen (1884–1946)	WGPSN
van Rhijn	52.47°N 146.37°E	46.16	1970	Pieter Johannes van Rhijn (1886–1960)	WGPSN
Van Vleck	1.77°S 78.2°E	33.48	1976	John Monroe Van Vleck (1833–1912)	WGPSN
Van Wijk	62.5°S 119.06°E	31.06	1970	Uco van Wijk (1924–1966)	WGPSN
van't Hoff	61.75°N 132.68°W	107.3	1970	Jacobus van 't Hoff (1852–1911)	WGPSN
Vasco da Gama	13.78°N 83.94°W	93.52	1935	Vasco da Gama (1469–1524)	WGPSN
Vashakidze	43.65°N 93.01°E	44.99	1970	Mikheil Alexandres dze Vashakidze (1909–1956)	WGPSN
Vasya	38.3°N 35°W	0.1	2012	Russian male name	WGPSN
Vaughan	41.46°N 171.78°E	3	2019	Dorothy Vaughan (1910–2008)	WGPSN
Vavilov	0.87°S 138.77°W	98.22	1970	Nikolai Vavilov (1887–1943) and Sergey Ivanovich Vavilov (1891–1951)	WGPSN
Vega	45.41°S 63.27°E	73.51	1935	Jurij Vega (1754–1802)	WGPSN
Vendelinus	16.46°S 61.55°E	141.21	1935	Godefroid Wendelin (1580–1667)	WGPSN
Vening Meinesz	0.1°S 162.51°E	88.69	1970	Felix A. Vening Meinesz (1887–1966)	WGPSN
Ventris	4.77°S 157.97°E	100.74	1970	Michael George Francis Ventris (1922–1956)	WGPSN
Vera	26.33°N 43.71°W	2.27	1976	Latin female name	WGPSN
Vernadskiy	23.11°N 130.43°E	91.97	1970	Vladimir Ivanovich Vernadsky (1863–1945)	WGPSN
Verne	24.95°N 25.38°W	1.54	1976	Jules Verne (1828–1905)	WGPSN
Vertregt	19.3°S 171.12°E	172.76	1979	Marinus Vertregt (1897–1973)	WGPSN
Very	25.62°N 25.35°E	4.65	1973	Frank Washington Very (1852–1927)	WGPSN
Vesalius	3.23°S 114.79°E	64.65	1970	Andreas Vesalius (1514–1564)	WGPSN
Vestine	33.87°N 93.68°E	97.81	1970	Ernest Harry Vestine (1906–1968)	WGPSN
Vetchinkin	9.77°N 131.08°E	94.29	1970	Vladimir Petrovich Vetchinkin (1888–1950)	WGPSN
Vieta	29.31°S 56.53°W	87.16	1935	Francois Vieta (1540–1603)	WGPSN
Vilʹev	5.76°S 144.39°E	45.83	1970	Mikhail Anatolʹevich Vilʹev (1893–1919)	WGPSN
Virchow	9.88°N 83.77°E	18.83	1979	Rudolf Ludwig Karl Virchow (1821–1902)	WGPSN
Virtanen	15.64°N 176.74°E	39.65	1979	Artturi Ilmari Virtanen (1895–1973)	WGPSN
Vitello	30.42°S 37.55°W	42.51	1935	Erazmus Ciolek Witelo (1210–1285)	WGPSN
Vitruvius	17.66°N 31.28°E	30.94	1935	Marcus Pollio Vitruvius (c.80/70–c.15 BC)	WGPSN
Vitya	38.3°N 35°W	0.2	2012	Russian male name	WGPSN
Viviani	5.16°N 117.15°E	26.94	1976	Vincenzo Viviani (1622–1703)	WGPSN
Vlacq	53.39°S 38.69°E	89.21	1935	Adriaan Vlacq (c. 1600–1667)	WGPSN
Vogel	15.11°S 5.83°E	26.3	1935	Hermann Carl Vogel (1841–1907)	WGPSN
Volkov	13.62°S 131.67°E	40.84	1973	Vladislav Nikolayevich Volkov (1935–1971)	WGPSN
Volta	53.9°N 84.77°W	117.15	1964	Count Alessandro Giuseppe Antonio Anastasio Volta (1745–1827)	WGPSN
Volterra	56.55°N 131.64°E	55.1	1970	Vito Volterra (1860–1940)	WGPSN
von Baeyer	81.8°S 61.87°E	13.46	2009	Adolf von Baeyer (1835–1917)	WGPSN
von Behring	7.75°S 71.72°E	37.65	1979	Emil Adolf von Behring (1854–1917)	WGPSN
von Békésy	51.92°N 126.73°E	96.25	1979	Georg von Békésy (1899–1972)	WGPSN
von Braun	41.04°N 78.08°W	61.83	1994	Wernher von Braun (1912–1977)	WGPSN
Von der Pahlen	24.84°S 133.01°W	53.89	1970	Baron Emanuel von der Pahlen (1882–1952)	WGPSN
Von Kármán	44.45°S 176.25°E	186.35	1970	Theodore von Kármán (1881–1963)	WGPSN
Von Neumann	40.28°N 153.25°E	74.83	1970	John von Neumann (1903–1957)	WGPSN
Von Zeipel	42.19°N 141.93°W	83.41	1970	Edvard Hugo von Zeipel (1873–1959)	WGPSN
Voskresenskiy	27.91°N 88.12°W	49.37	1970	Leonid Alexandrovich Voskresenskiy (1913–1965)	WGPSN

back to top

== W ==
Crater	Coordinates	Diameter (km)	Approval year	Eponym	Ref
W. Bond	65.41°N 3.52°E	170.53	1935	William Cranch Bond (1789–1859)	WGPSN
Walker	25.82°S 161.92°W	32.94	1970	Joseph Albert Walker (1921–1966)	WGPSN
Wallace	20.26°N 8.75°W	25.71	1935	Alfred Russel Wallace (1823–1913)	WGPSN
Wallach	4.89°N 32.27°E	5.74	1979	Otto Wallach (1847–1931)	WGPSN
Walter	28.04°N 33.81°W	1.26	1979	German male name	WGPSN
Walther	33.25°S 0.62°E	134.23	1935	Bernhard Walther (1430–1504)	WGPSN
Wan-Hoo	9.96°S 138.91°W	53.28	1970	Wan Hu (ahistoric, first mentioned in 1945)	WGPSN
Wapowski	83.08°S 53.79°E	11.45	2009	Bernard Wapowski (1450–1535)	WGPSN
Wargentin	49.53°S 60.44°W	84.69	1935	Pehr Vilhelm Wargentin (1717–1783)	WGPSN
Warner	3.98°S 87.35°E	34.51	1976	Worcester Reed Warner (1846–1929)	WGPSN
Waterman	25.7°S 128.18°E	74.91	1970	Alan Tower Waterman (1892–1967)	WGPSN
Watson	62.59°S 124.05°W	59.43	1970	James Craig Watson (1838–1880)	WGPSN
Watt	49.6°S 48.48°E	66.54	1935	James Watt (1736–1819)	WGPSN
Watts	8.84°N 46.31°E	15.55	1973	Chester Burleigh Watts (1889–1971)	WGPSN
Webb	0.98°S 60°E	21.41	1935	Thomas William Webb (1806–1885)	WGPSN
Weber	50.06°N 123.79°W	43.95	1970	Wilhelm Eduard Weber (1804–1891)	WGPSN
Wegener	45.21°N 113.81°W	95.78	1970	Alfred Lothar Wegener (1880–1930)	WGPSN
Weierstrass	1.26°S 77.15°E	31.32	1976	Karl Weierstrass (1815–1897)	WGPSN
Weigel	58.39°S 39.34°W	34.85	1935	Erhard Weigel (1625–1699)	WGPSN
Weinek	27.57°S 37.06°E	32.01	1935	Ladislaus Weinek (1848–1913)	WGPSN
Weiss	31.76°S 19.59°W	66.56	1935	Edmund Weiss (1837–1917)	WGPSN
Werner	28.03°S 3.29°E	70.59	1935	Johann Werner (1468–1528)	WGPSN
Wexler	68.88°S 90.71°E	52.44	1970	Harry Wexler (1911–1962)	WGPSN
Weyl	15.97°N 120.53°W	122.82	1970	Hermann Weyl (1885–1955)	WGPSN
Whewell	4.16°N 13.73°E	13.05	1935	William Whewell (1794–1866)	WGPSN
Whipple	89.14°N 120.02°E	14.53	2009	Fred Lawrence Whipple (1906–2004)	WGPSN
Whitaker	84.67°S 0.69°E	20.00	2025	Ewen Whitaker (1922–2016)	WGPSN
White	44.8°S 159.04°W	42.34	1970	Ed White (1930–1967)	WGPSN
Wichmann	7.54°S 38.13°W	9.77	1935	Moritz Ludwig George Wichmann (1821–1859)	WGPSN
Widmannstätten	6.09°S 85.43°E	52.88	1973	Alois von Beckh-Widmannstätten (1753–1849)	WGPSN
Wiechert	84.03°S 164.7°E	40.82	1970	Emil Johann Wiechert (1861–1928)	WGPSN
Wiener	40.9°N 146.51°E	113.39	1970	Norbert Wiener (1894–1964)	WGPSN
Wildt	9.02°N 75.83°E	12.31	1979	Rupert Wildt (1905–1976)	WGPSN
Wilhelm	43.21°S 20.94°W	100.83	1935	Wilhelm IV, Landgrave of Hesse (1532–1592)	WGPSN
Wilkins	29.58°S 19.58°E	59.44	1961	Hugh Percy Wilkins (1896–1960)	WGPSN
Williams	42.02°N 37.31°E	36.36	1935	Arthur Stanley Williams (1861–1938)	WGPSN
Wilsing	20.97°S 155.05°W	66.8	1970	Johannes Wilsing (1856–1943)	WGPSN
Wilson	69.33°S 42.83°W	66.57	1935	Alexander Wilson (1714–1786), Charles Thomson Rees Wilson (1869–1959) and Ralph Elmer Wilson (1886–1960)	WGPSN
Winkler	42.23°N 178.81°W	22.85	1970	Johannes Winkler (1897–1947)	WGPSN
Winlock	35.4°N 105.92°W	63.93	1970	Joseph Winlock (1826–1875)	WGPSN
Winthrop	10.76°S 44.46°W	17.25	1976	John Winthrop (1714–1779)	WGPSN
Wöhler	38.25°S 31.35°E	28.07	1935	Friedrich Wöhler (1800–1882)	WGPSN
Wolf	22.79°S 16.63°W	25.74	1935	Maximilian Wolf (1863–1932)	WGPSN
Wollaston	30.6°N 46.98°W	9.64	1935	William Hyde Wollaston (1766–1828)	WGPSN
Woltjer	44.87°N 159.83°W	44.5	1970	Jan Woltjer (1891–1946)	WGPSN
Wood	43.66°N 121.83°W	84.15	1970	Robert Williams Wood (1868–1955)	WGPSN
Wright	31.55°S 86.74°W	40.16	1964	Frederick Eugene Wright (1877–1953), Thomas Wright (1711–1786) and William Hammond Wright (1871–1959)	WGPSN
Wróblewski	24°S 152.8°E	21.78	1976	Sigmund von Wróblewski (1845–1888)	WGPSN
Wrottesley	23.9°S 56.62°E	58.38	1935	John Wrottesley, 2nd Baron Wrottesley (1798–1867)	WGPSN
Wurzelbauer	34.04°S 16.06°W	86.77	1935	Johann Philipp von Wurzelbauer (1651–1725)	WGPSN
Wyld	1.42°S 98.1°E	103.4	1970	James Hart Wyld (1913–1953)	WGPSN

back to top

== X ==
Crater	Coordinates	Diameter (km)	Approval Year	Eponym	Ref
Xenophanes	57.49°N 82.01°W	117.57	1935	Xenophanes (570–480 BC)	WGPSN
Xenophon	22.79°S 122.05°E	25.5	1976	Xenophon (427–355 BC)	WGPSN

back to top

== Y ==
Crater	Coordinates	Diameter (km)	Approval Year	Eponym	Ref
Yablochkov	60.78°N 127.58°E	101.49	1970	Pavel Nikolayevich Yablochkov (1847–1894)	WGPSN
Yakovkin	54.42°S 78.93°W	35.92	1985	Avenir Aleksandrovich Yakovkin (1887–1974)	WGPSN
Yamamoto	58.16°N 161.87°E	77.46	1970	Issei Yamamoto (1889–1959)	WGPSN
Yangelʹ	16.96°N 4.69°E	7.87	1973	Mikhail Kuzmich Yangelʹ (1911–1971)	WGPSN
Yerkes	14.6°N 51.7°E	34.94	1935	Charles Tyson Yerkes (1837–1905)	WGPSN
Yoshi	24.56°N 10.99°E	0.5	1976	Japanese male name	WGPSN
Young	41.54°S 50.98°E	71.44	1935	Thomas Young (1773–1829)	WGPSN

back to top

== Z ==
Crater	Coordinates	Diameter (km)	Approval Year	Eponym	Ref
Zach	60.92°S 5.25°E	68.54	1935	Franz Xaver von Zach (1754–1832)	WGPSN
Zagut	31.94°S 21.89°E	78.92	1935	Abraham Ben Samuel Zagut (c. 1450–c. 1522)	WGPSN
Zähringer	5.51°N 40.21°E	11.19	1976	Joseph Zähringer (1929–1970)	WGPSN
Zanstra	2.93°N 124.69°E	39.5	1973	Herman Zanstra (1894–1972)	WGPSN
Zasyadko	3.96°N 94.19°E	10.27	1976	Alexander Dmitrievich Zasyadko (1779–1837)	WGPSN
Zeeman	75.07°S 135.06°W	186.56	1970	Pieter Zeeman (1865–1943)	WGPSN
Zelinskiy	28.74°S 166.86°E	53.95	1970	Nikolay Dimitrievich Zelinskiy (1860–1953)	WGPSN
Zeno	45.15°N 72.98°E	66.78	1935	Zeno of Citium (c. 335–263 BC)	WGPSN
Zernike	18.34°N 168.4°E	50.68	1970	Frits Zernike (1888–1966)	WGPSN
Zhang Yuzhe	69.07°S 137.82°W	38	2010	Zhang Yuzhe (1902–1986)	WGPSN
Zhiritskiy	24.84°S 120.26°E	33.36	1970	Georgiy Sergeevich Zhiritskiy (1893–1966)	WGPSN
Zhukovskiy	7.55°N 167.28°W	82.07	1970	Nikolay Egorovich Zhukovskiy (1847–1921)	WGPSN
Zinner	26.64°N 58.86°W	4.56	1973	Ernst Zinner (1886–1970)	WGPSN
Zi Wei	44.12°N 19.52°W	0.42	2015	Ziwei enclosure (location on ancient Chinese star map)	WGPSN
Zöllner	7.97°S 18.9°E	47.69	1935	Johann Karl Friedrich Zöllner (1834–1882)	WGPSN
Zsigmondy	59.52°N 105.3°W	66.88	1976	Richard Adolf Zsigmondy (1865–1929)	WGPSN
Zucchius	61.38°S 50.65°W	63.18	1935	Niccolò Zucchi (1586–1670)	WGPSN
Zupus	17.18°S 52.37°W	35.29	1935	Giovanni Battista Zupi (c. 1590–1650)	WGPSN
Zwicky	16.17°S 167.64°E	126.06	1979	Fritz Zwicky (1898–1974)	WGPSN

back to top
