= Theiler =

Theiler is a surname. Notable people with the surname include:

- Arnold Theiler (1867–1936), South African scientist and veterinarian
- Gertrud Theiler (1897–1986), South African parasitologist
- Jorge Theiler (born 1964), Argentine football player and manager
- Luciano Theiler (born 1981), Argentine football player and manager
- Max Theiler (1899–1972), South African-American virologist and physician
- Rolf Theiler (born 1957), Swiss businessman

== See also ==
- Theiler (crater), a lunar impact crater
