= List of craters on the Moon: A–B =

The list of approved names in the Gazetteer of Planetary Nomenclature maintained by the International Astronomical Union includes the diameter of the crater and the person the crater is named for. Where a crater formation has associated satellite craters, these are detailed on the main crater description pages.

List of craters on the Moon

- A
- B
- C
- D
- E
- F
- G
- H
- I
- J
- K
- L
- M
- N
- O
- P
- Q
- R
- S
- T
- U
- V
- W
- X
- Y
- Z

== A ==
Crater	Coordinates	Diameter (km)	Approval Year	Eponym	Ref
Abbe	57.58°S 174.77°E	63.98	1970	Ernst Abbe (1840–1905)	WGPSN
Abbot	5.56°N 54.74°E	10.4	1973	Charles Greeley Abbot (1872–1973)	WGPSN
Abel	34.63°S 85.78°E	137.35	1964	Niels Henrik Abel (1802–1829)	WGPSN
Abenezra	20.99°S 11.89°E	43.19	1935	Abraham ibn Ezra (1092–1167)	WGPSN
Abetti	20.11°N 27.82°E	1.6	1976	Antonio Abetti (1846–1928) and Giorgio Abetti (1882–1982)	WGPSN
Abul Wáfa	0.96°N 116.63°E	54.18	1970	Abul Wáfa (940–998)	WGPSN
Abulfeda	13.87°S 13.91°E	62.23	1935	Ismael Abul-fida (1273–1331)	WGPSN
Acosta	5.65°S 60.14°E	13.06	1976	Cristobal Acosta (1515–1580)	WGPSN
Adams	31.89°S 68.39°E	63.27	1970	John Couch Adams (1819–1892), Charles Hitchcock Adams (1868–1951) and Walter Sydney Adams (1876–1956)	WGPSN
Aepinus	87.96°N 109.69°W	16.74	2009	Franz Aepinus (1724–1802)	WGPSN
Agatharchides	19.85°S 31.11°W	51.98	1935	Agatharchides (died c. 150 BC)	WGPSN
Agrippa	4.1°N 10.47°E	43.75	1935	Agrippa (fl. 92 AD)	WGPSN
Airy	18.14°S 5.61°E	38.9	1935	George Biddell Airy (1801–1892)	WGPSN
Aitken	16.44°S 172.96°E	129.69	1970	Robert Aitken (1864–1951)	WGPSN
Akis	20.01°N 31.76°W	2.28	1976	(Greek female name)	WGPSN
Alan	10.93°S 6.17°W	1.44	1976	(Celtic male name)	WGPSN
Al-Bakri	14.34°N 20.25°E	12.21	1976	Abu Abdullah al-Bakri (1010–1094)	WGPSN
Albategnius	11.24°S 4.01°E	130.84	1935	al-Batani (850–929)	WGPSN
Albert	38.3°N 35°W	0.1	2012	(German male name)	WGPSN
Al-Biruni	18.07°N 92.62°E	80.41	1970	al-Biruni (973–1048)	WGPSN
Alden	23.51°S 111.11°E	111.44	1970	Harold Alden (1890–1964)	WGPSN
Alder	48.63°S 177.88°W	82.12	1979	Kurt Alder (1902–1958)	WGPSN
Aldrin	1.41°N 22.09°E	2.8	1970	Buzz Aldrin (born 1930)	WGPSN
Alekhin	67.94°S 131.85°W	74.82	1970	Nikolai Alekhin (1913–1964)	WGPSN
Alexander	40.25°N 13.69°E	94.8	1935	Alexander the Great (356–323 BC)	WGPSN
Alfraganus	5.42°S 18.97°E	20.52	1935	Alfraganus (died c. 840)	WGPSN
Alhazen	15.91°N 71.83°E	34.65	1935	Alhazen (987–1038)	WGPSN
Aliacensis	30.6°S 5.13°E	79.65	1935	Pierre d'Ailly (1350–1420)	WGPSN
Al-Khwarizmi	7.02°N 107.01°E	56.25	1973	al-Khwarizmi (died c. 825)	WGPSN
Almanon	16.85°S 15.14°E	47.76	1935	Abdalla Al Mamun (786–833)	WGPSN
Al-Marrakushi	10.45°S 55.77°E	8.57	1976	Ibn al-Banna al-Marrakushi (fl. c. 1281–82 AD)	WGPSN
Aloha	29.79°N 53.88°W	2.55	1976	(a Hawaiian female name)	WGPSN
Alpetragius	16.05°S 4.51°W	40.02	1935	Nur Ed-Din Al Betrugi (died c. 1100)	WGPSN
Alphonsus	13.39°S 2.85°W	110.54	1935	Alfonso X of Castile (1223–1284)	WGPSN
Alter	18.74°N 107.8°W	64.73	1970	Dinsmore Alter (1888–1968)	WGPSN
Ameghino	3.3°N 57.04°E	9.2	1976	Fiorino Ameghino (1854–1911)	WGPSN
Amici	10.06°S 172.23°W	52.03	1970	Giovanni Battista Amici (1786–1863)	WGPSN
Ammonius	8.52°S 0.83°W	8.55	1976	Ammonius Hermiae (died c. 517)	WGPSN
Amontons	5.34°S 46.78°E	2.47	1976	Guillaume Amontons (1663–1705)	WGPSN
Amundsen	84.44°S 83.07°E	103.39	1964	Roald Amundsen (1872–1928)	WGPSN
Anaxagoras	73.48°N 10.17°W	51.9	1935	Anaxagoras (500–428 BC)	WGPSN
Anaximander	66.97°N 51.44°W	68.71	1935	Anaximander (c. 610 – 546 BC)	WGPSN
Anaximenes	72.49°N 44.98°W	81.12	1935	Anaximenes (585–528 BC)	WGPSN
Anděl	10.41°S 12.38°E	32.93	1935	Karel Anděl (1884–1947)	WGPSN
Anders	41.31°S 143.3°W	41.33	1970	William A. Anders (1933–2024)	WGPSN
Anders' Earthrise	11.73°S 100.47°W	40.15	2018	Crater visible in the foreground of the iconic Earthrise color photograph (AS08-14-2383) taken by astronaut William A. Anders	WGPSN
Anderson	15.5°N 170.79°E	105.33	1970	John August Anderson (1876–1959)	WGPSN
Andersson	49.95°S 95.46°W	13.42	1985	Leif Erland Andersson (1943–1979)	WGPSN
Andronov	22.68°S 146.11°E	16.57	1976	Aleksandr Aleksandrovich Andronov (1901–1952)	WGPSN
Ango	20.48°N 32.34°W	0.87	1976	(African male name)	WGPSN
Angström	29.9°N 41.67°W	9.55	1935	Anders Jonas Ångström (1814–1874)	WGPSN
Ann	25.11°N 0.05°W	2.12	1976	(Hebrew female name)	WGPSN
Annegrit	29.43°N 25.64°W	1.29	1976	(German female name)	WGPSN
Ansgarius	12.92°S 79.72°E	91.42	1935	Saint Ansgar (801–864)	WGPSN
Antoniadi	69.3°S 173.06°W	137.92	1970	Eugene Antoniadi (1870–1944)	WGPSN
Anuchin	48.85°S 101.66°E	62.14	1979	Dmitry Nikolayevich Anuchin (1843–1923)	WGPSN
Anville	1.84°N 49.51°E	10.26	1976	Jean-Baptiste Bourguignon d'Anville (1697–1782)	WGPSN
Apianus	26.96°S 7.87°E	63.44	1935	Petrus Apianus (1495–1552)	WGPSN
Apollo	35.69°S 151.48°W	524.23	1970	Apollo program	WGPSN
Apollonius	4.51°N 60.96°E	50.66	1935	Apollonius of Perga (3rd century BC)	WGPSN
Appleton	37.05°N 158.17°E	64.59	1970	Edward Victor Appleton (1892–1965)	WGPSN
Arago	6.15°N 21.43°E	25.51	1935	François Arago (1786–1853)	WGPSN
Aratus	23.58°N 4.51°E	10.23	1935	Aratus of Soli (c. 315 – 245 BC)	WGPSN
Archimedes	29.72°N 3.99°W	81.04	1935	Archimedes (c. 287 – 212 BC)	WGPSN
Archytas	58.87°N 4.99°E	31.95	1935	Archytas (c. 428 – 347 BC)	WGPSN
Argelander	16.55°S 5.8°E	33.72	1935	Friedrich Wilhelm August Argelander (1799–1875)	WGPSN
Ariadaeus	4.55°N 17.28°E	10.4	1935	Philipus III Arrhidaeus (died 317 BC)	WGPSN
Aristarchus	23.73°N 47.49°W	39.99	1935	Aristarchus of Samos (c. 310 – 230 BC)	WGPSN
Aristillus	33.88°N 1.21°E	54.37	1935	Aristillus (fl. c. 280 BC)	WGPSN
Aristoteles	50.24°N 17.32°E	87.57	1935	Aristotle (384–322 BC)	WGPSN
Armiński	16.36°S 154.22°E	26.76	1976	Franciszek Armiński (1789–1848)	WGPSN
Armstrong	1.35°N 24.94°E	4.21	1970	Neil Armstrong (1930–2012)	WGPSN
Arnold	66.98°N 35.83°E	93.13	1935	Christoph Arnold (1650–1695)	WGPSN
Arrhenius	55.58°S 91.45°W	40.93	1970	Svante Arrhenius (1859–1927)	WGPSN
Artamonov	25.44°N 103.79°E	62.45	1970	Nikolaj N. Artamonov (1906–1965)	WGPSN
Artemʹev	10.4°N 145.22°W	66.39	1970	Vladimir A. Artemyev (1885–1962)	WGPSN
Artemis	25.03°N 25.36°W	2.28	1976	Artemis	WGPSN
Artsimovich	27.61°N 36.63°W	7.96	1973	Lev A. Artsimovich (1909–1973)	WGPSN
Aryabhata	6.2°N 35.17°E	21.89	1979	Aryabhata (476 – c. 550)	WGPSN
Arzachel	18.26°S 1.93°W	96.99	1935	Arzachel (c. 1028 – 1087)	WGPSN
Asada	7.25°N 49.9°E	12.37	1976	Goryu Asada (1734–1799)	WGPSN
Asclepi	55.19°S 25.52°E	40.56	1935	Giuseppe Asclepi (1706–1776)	WGPSN
Ashbrook	81.1°S 110.58°W	157.68	1994	Joseph Ashbrook (1918–1980)	WGPSN
Aston	32.77°N 87.68°W	44.48	1964	Francis William Aston (1877–1945)	WGPSN
Atlas	46.74°N 44.38°E	88.12	1935	Atlas (mythology)	WGPSN
Atwood	5.88°S 57.78°E	28.64	1976	George Atwood (1745–1807)	WGPSN
Autolycus	30.68°N 1.49°E	38.88	1935	Autolycus of Pitane (c. 360 BC – c. 290 BC)	WGPSN
Auwers	15°N 17.12°E	19.64	1935	Arthur Auwers (1838–1915)	WGPSN
Auzout	10.21°N 64.01°E	32.92	1961	Adrien Auzout (1622–1691)	WGPSN
Avery	1.32°S 81.37°E	10.73	1976	Oswald Theodore Avery (1877–1955)	WGPSN
Avicenna	39.63°N 97.28°W	72.99	1970	Avicenna (980–1037)	WGPSN
Avogadro	63.21°N 165.36°E	129.84	1970	Amedeo Avogadro (1776–1856)	WGPSN
Azophi	22.19°S 12.7°E	47.54	1935	Abd Al-Rahman Al Sufi (903–986)	WGPSN

back to top

== B ==
Crater	Coordinates	Diameter (km)	Approval Year	Eponym	Ref
Baade	44.75°S 82.03°W	57.85	1964	Walter Baade (1893–1960)	WGPSN
Babakin	20.81°S 123.26°E	19.15	1973	Georgij N. Babakin (1914–1971)	WGPSN
Babbage	59.56°N 57.38°W	146.56	1935	Charles Babbage (1792–1871)	WGPSN
Babcock	4.13°N 94.14°E	95.28	1970	Harold D. Babcock (1882–1968)	WGPSN
Back	1.2°N 80.67°E	34.63	1976	Ernst Emil Alexander Back (1881–1959)	WGPSN
Backlund	16.22°S 103.35°E	75.46	1970	Oskar Backlund (1846–1916)	WGPSN
Baco	51.04°S 19.1°E	65.31	1935	Roger Bacon (c. 1214 – c. 1294)	WGPSN
Baillaud	74.61°N 37.35°E	89.44	1935	Benjamin Baillaud (1848–1934)	WGPSN
Bailly	66.82°S 68.9°W	300.56	1935	Jean Sylvain Bailly (1736–1793)	WGPSN
Baily	49.78°N 30.56°E	25.68	1935	Francis Baily (1774–1844)	WGPSN
Balandin	18.94°S 152.58°E	11.81	1976	Aleksei Aleksandrovich Balandin (1898–1967)	WGPSN
Balboa	19.24°N 83.31°W	69.19	1964	Vasco Núñez de Balboa (1475–1519)	WGPSN
Baldet	53.32°S 151.96°W	55.76	1970	Fernand Baldet (1885–1964)	WGPSN
Ball	35.92°S 8.39°W	40.31	1935	William Ball (died 1690)	WGPSN
Balmer	20.27°S 70.22°E	136.3	1964	Johann Balmer (1825–1898)	WGPSN
Banachiewicz	5.28°N 80.01°E	99.09	1964	Tadeusz Banachiewicz (1882–1954)	WGPSN
Bancroft	28.07°N 6.43°W	12.5	1976	Wilder Dwight Bancroft (1867–1953)	WGPSN
Bandfield	5.40°S 90.77°E	1.0	2022	Joshua Bandfield (1974–2019)	WGPSN
Banting	26.58°N 16.43°E	5.15	1973	Frederick Banting (1891–1941)	WGPSN
Barbier	23.85°S 157.93°E	65.38	1970	Daniel Barbier (1907–1965)	WGPSN
Barkla	10.67°S 67.22°E	40.9	1979	Charles Glover Barkla (1877–1944)	WGPSN
Barnard	29.79°S 85.95°E	115.73	1964	Edward Emerson Barnard (1857–1923)	WGPSN
Barocius	44.98°S 16.81°E	82.72	1935	Francesco Barozzi (fl. 1570)	WGPSN
Barringer	28.22°S 150.43°W	66.89	1970	Daniel Barringer (1860–1929)	WGPSN
Barrow	71.28°N 7.59°E	93.82	1935	Isaac Barrow (1630–1677)	WGPSN
Bartels	24.51°N 89.85°W	54.95	1970	Julius Bartels (1899–1964)	WGPSN
Bawa	25.28°S 102.56°E	1.57	1976	(African male name)	WGPSN
Bay	88.76°S 36.85°W	3.50	2025	Zoltán Lajos Bay (1900–1992)	WGPSN
Bayer	51.62°S 35.14°W	48.51	1935	Johann Bayer (1572–1625)	WGPSN
Beals	37.11°N 86.58°E	52.61	1982	Carlyle Smith Beals (1899–1979)	WGPSN
Beaumont	18.08°S 28.82°E	50.69	1935	Léonce Élie de Beaumont (1798–1874)	WGPSN
Becquerel	40.79°N 129.5°E	62.86	1970	Henri Becquerel (1852–1908)	WGPSN
Bečvář	2.57°S 125.07°E	66.62	1970	Antonin Becvar (1901–1965)	WGPSN
Beer	27.07°N 9.1°W	9.06	1935	Wilhelm Beer (1797–1850)	WGPSN
Behaim	16.61°S 79.41°E	56.21	1935	Martin Behaim (1459–1507)	WGPSN
Beijerinck	13.4°S 151.84°E	76.77	1970	Martinus Willem Beijerinck (1851–1931)	WGPSN
Beketov	16.23°N 29.18°E	8.3	1976	Nikolay Nikolayevich Beketov (1827–1911)	WGPSN
Béla	24.67°N 2.27°E	10.07	1976	(Hungarian female name)	WGPSN
Belʹkovich	61.53°N 90.15°E	215.08	1964	Igor Vladimirovich Belkovich (1904–1949)	WGPSN
Bell	21.98°N 96.53°W	86.33	1970	Alexander Graham Bell (1847–1922)	WGPSN
Bellinsgauzen	60.72°S 164.85°W	63.23	1970	Fabian Gottlieb von Bellingshausen (1778–1852)	WGPSN
Bellot	12.48°S 48.19°E	17.5	1935	Joseph René Bellot (1826–1853)	WGPSN
Belopolʹskiy	17.25°S 128.23°W	61.9	1970	Aristarkh Belopolsky (1854–1934)	WGPSN
Belyaev	23.1°N 143.11°E	55.9	1970	Pavel Ivanovich Belyaev (1925–1970)	WGPSN
Benedict	4.35°N 141.54°E	13.83	1976	Francis Gano Benedict (1870–1957)	WGPSN
Bergman	6.97°N 137.49°E	22.51	1976	Torbern Olof Bergman (1735–1784)	WGPSN
Bergstrand	18.72°S 176.44°E	42.98	1970	Carl Östen Emanuel Bergstrand (1873–1948)	WGPSN
Berkner	25.13°N 105.24°W	87.62	1970	Lloyd Viel Berkner (1905–1967)	WGPSN
Berlage	63.04°S 163.61°W	93.75	1970	Hendrik Petrus Berlage (1896–1968)	WGPSN
Bernoulli	34.93°N 60.61°E	47.3	1985	Jacques Bernoulli (1654–1705) and Jean Bernoulli (1667–1748)	WGPSN
Berosus	33.5°N 69.99°E	75.24	1935	Berosus the Chaldean (died c. 250 BC)	WGPSN
Berzelius	36.55°N 50.95°E	48.53	1935	Jöns Jakob Berzelius (1779–1848)	WGPSN
Bessarion	14.85°N 37.31°W	9.84	1935	Johannes Bessarion (c. 1369 – 1472)	WGPSN
Bessel	21.73°N 17.92°E	15.56	1935	Friedrich Wilhelm Bessel (1784–1846)	WGPSN
Bettinus	63.4°S 45.16°W	71.78	1935	Mario Bettinus (1582–1657)	WGPSN
Bhabha	55.5°S 165.31°W	70.25	1970	Homi Jehangir Bhabha (1909–1966)	WGPSN
Bianchini	48.78°N 34.37°W	37.59	1935	Francesco Bianchini (1662–1729)	WGPSN
Biela	54.99°S 51.63°E	77.03	1935	Wilhelm von Biela (1782–1856)	WGPSN
Bilharz	5.83°S 56.34°E	44.55	1976	Theodore Maximilian Bilharz (1825–1862)	WGPSN
Billy	13.83°S 50.24°W	45.57	1935	Jacques de Billy (1602–1679)	WGPSN
Bingham	8.02°N 115.05°E	34.99	1976	Hiram Bingham III (1875–1956)	WGPSN
Biot	22.7°S 51.08°E	13.01	1935	Jean-Baptiste Biot (1774–1862)	WGPSN
Birkeland	30.17°S 174.01°E	81.64	1970	Olaf Kristian Birkeland (1867–1917)	WGPSN
Birkhoff	58.45°N 145.65°W	329.81	1970	George D. Birkhoff (1884–1944)	WGPSN
Birmingham	65.12°N 10.7°W	89.92	1935	John Birmingham (1816–1884)	WGPSN
Birt	22.36°S 8.59°W	15.81	1935	William Radcliffe Birt (1804–1881)	WGPSN
Bi Sheng	78.35°N 148.46°E	55.27	2010	Bi Sheng (990–1051)	WGPSN
Bjerknes	38.5°S 113.69°E	48.18	1970	Vilhelm Frimann Koren Bjerknes (1862–1951)	WGPSN
Black	9.2°S 80.39°E	19.46	1976	Joseph Black (1728–1799)	WGPSN
Blackett	37.55°S 115.84°W	145.31	1979	Patrick Maynard Stuart Blackett (1897–1974)	WGPSN
Blagg	1.22°N 1.46°E	4.97	1935	Mary Adela Blagg (1858–1944)	WGPSN
Blancanus	63.77°S 21.63°W	105.82	1935	Giuseppe Biancani (1566–1624)	WGPSN
Blanchard	58.25°S 93.5°W	37.46	1991	Jean-Pierre Blanchard (1753–1809)	WGPSN
Blanchinus	25.32°S 2.44°E	59.9	1935	Giovanni Bianchini (fl. 1458)	WGPSN
Blazhko	31.37°N 147.86°W	51.11	1970	Sergei Nikolaevich Blazhko (1870–1956)	WGPSN
Bliss	53.04°N 13.78°W	22.85	2000	Nathaniel Bliss (1700–1764)	WGPSN
Bobillier	19.63°N 15.44°E	6.04	1976	Étienne Bobillier (1798–1840)	WGPSN
Bobone	26.7°N 132.12°W	32.14	1970	Jorge Bobone (1901–1958)	WGPSN
Bode	6.71°N 2.45°W	17.8	1935	Johann Elert Bode (1747–1826)	WGPSN
Boethius	5.57°N 72.33°E	11.17	1976	Boethius (c. 480 – 524)	WGPSN
Boguslawsky	72.9°S 43.26°E	94.59	1935	Palm Heinrich Ludwig von Boguslawski (1789–1851)	WGPSN
Bohnenberger	16.24°S 40.06°E	31.74	1935	Johann Gottlob Friedrich von Bohnenberger (1765–1831)	WGPSN
Bohr	12.71°N 86.52°W	70.07	1964	Niels H. D. Bohr (1885–1962)	WGPSN
Bok	20.26°S 171.58°W	43.03	1979	Priscilla Fairfield Bok (1896–1975) and Bart J. Bok (1906–1983)	WGPSN
Boltzmann	74.82°S 90.41°W	72.31	1964	Ludwig E. Boltzmann (1844–1906)	WGPSN
Bolyai	33.85°S 126.12°E	102.22	1970	János Bolyai (1802–1860)	WGPSN
Bombelli	5.28°N 56.19°E	9.72	1976	Raphael Bombelli (1526–1572)	WGPSN
Bondarenko	17.24°S 136.89°E	28.26	1991	Valentin V. Bondarenko (1937–1961)	WGPSN
Bonpland	8.38°S 17.33°W	59.25	1935	Aimé Bonpland (1773–1858)	WGPSN
Boole	63.79°N 87.29°W	61.34	1964	George Boole (1815–1864)	WGPSN
Borda	25.2°S 46.52°E	45.4	1935	Jean Charles Borda (1733–1799)	WGPSN
Borel	22.37°N 26.42°E	4.66	1976	Félix Édouard Émile Borel (1871–1956)	WGPSN
Boris	30.53°N 33.5°W	1.73	1979	(Russian male name)	WGPSN
Borman	39.06°S 148.25°W	50.72	1970	Frank Borman (born 1928)	WGPSN
Born	6.05°S 66.83°E	15.07	1979	Max Born (1882–1970)	WGPSN
Borya	38.3°N 35°W	0.4	2012	Russian male name	WGPSN
Bosch	86.82°N 133.54°E	19.58	2009	Carl Bosch (1874–1940)	WGPSN
Boscovich	9.71°N 11.01°E	41.53	1935	Ruggiero Giuseppe Boscovich (1711–1787)	WGPSN
Bose	53.95°S 169.36°W	92.55	1970	Jagadish Chandra Bose (1858–1937)	WGPSN
Boss	45.75°N 88.68°E	50.2	1964	Lewis Boss (1846–1912)	WGPSN
Bouguer	52.32°N 35.82°W	22.23	1935	Pierre Bouguer (1698–1758)	WGPSN
Boussingault	70.21°S 53.73°E	127.61	1935	Jean Baptiste Boussingault (1802–1887)	WGPSN
Bowditch	24.97°S 103.07°E	43.04	1976	Nathaniel Bowditch (1773–1848)	WGPSN
Bowen	17.63°N 9.1°E	8.09	1973	Ira Sprague Bowen (1898–1973)	WGPSN
Boyle	53.29°S 177.89°E	57.13	1970	Robert Boyle (1627–1691)	WGPSN
Brackett	17.84°N 23.54°E	8.87	1973	Frederick Sumner Brackett (1896–1988)	WGPSN
Bragg	42.33°N 103.44°W	77.21	1970	William Henry Bragg (1862–1942)	WGPSN
Brashear	73.54°S 171.57°W	60.16	1970	John Alfred Brashear (1840–1920)	WGPSN
Braude	81.82°S 158.88°E	11.28	2009	Semion Braude (1911–2003)	WGPSN
Brayley	20.9°N 36.94°W	14.17	1935	Edward William Brayley (1801–1870)	WGPSN
Bredikhin	17.25°N 158.37°W	61.68	1970	Fedor Aleksandrovich Bredikhin (1831–1904)	WGPSN
Breislak	48.31°S 18.31°E	48.64	1935	Scipione Breislak (1748–1826)	WGPSN
Brenner	39.09°S 39.11°E	90.01	1935	Leo Brenner (1855–1928)	WGPSN
Brewster	23.27°N 34.69°E	9.83	1976	David Brewster (1781–1868)	WGPSN
Brianchon	74.75°N 88.36°W	137.26	1964	Charles Julien Brianchon (1783–1864)	WGPSN
Bridgman	43.39°N 136.98°E	81.89	1970	Percy Williams Bridgman (1882–1961)	WGPSN
Briggs	26.45°N 69.19°W	36.75	1935	Henry Briggs (1561–1630)	WGPSN
Brisbane	49.2°S 68.76°E	44.32	1935	Sir Thomas Brisbane (1770–1860)	WGPSN
Bronk	25.9°N 134.67°W	66.16	1979	Detlev Wulf Bronk (1897–1975)	WGPSN
Brouwer	35.82°S 124.75°W	119.6	1970	Dirk Brouwer (1902–1966) and Luitzen Egbertus Jan Brouwer (1881–1968)	WGPSN
Brown	46.53°S 17.99°W	34.03	1935	Ernest William Brown (1866–1938)	WGPSN
Bruce	1.16°N 0.37°E	6.14	1935	Catherine Wolfe Bruce (1816–1900)	WGPSN
Brunner	9.86°S 90.91°E	50.66	1970	William Otto Brunner (1878–1958)	WGPSN
Buch	38.9°S 17.68°E	51.31	1935	Christian Leopold von Buch (1774–1853)	WGPSN
Buffon	40.64°S 133.53°W	105.76	1970	Georges-Louis Leclerc, Comte de Buffon (1707–1788)	WGPSN
Buisson	1.47°S 112.95°E	61.27	1970	Henri Buisson (1873–1944)	WGPSN
Bullialdus	20.75°S 22.26°W	60.72	1935	Ismael Bullialdus (1605–1694)	WGPSN
Bunsen	41.4°N 85.46°W	55.22	1964	Robert Bunsen (1811–1899)	WGPSN
Burckhardt	31.11°N 56.39°E	54.36	1935	Johann Karl Burckhardt (1773–1825)	WGPSN
Bürg	45.07°N 28.21°E	41.04	1935	Johann Tobias Bürg (1766–1834)	WGPSN
Burnham	13.92°S 7.25°E	24.09	1935	Sherburne Wesley Burnham (1838–1921)	WGPSN
Büsching	38.04°S 19.96°E	53.49	1935	Anton Friedrich Büsching (1724–1793)	WGPSN
Butlerov	12.05°N 108.81°W	38.77	1970	Aleksandr M. Butlerov (1828–1886)	WGPSN
Buys-Ballot	20.86°N 174.82°E	66.38	1970	C. H. D. Buys Ballot (1817–1890)	WGPSN
Byrd	85.43°N 10.07°E	97.49	1964	Richard E. Byrd (1888–1957)	WGPSN
Byrgius	24.73°S 65.38°W	84.46	1935	Joost Bürgi (1552–1632)	WGPSN

back to top
