= List of craters on the Moon =

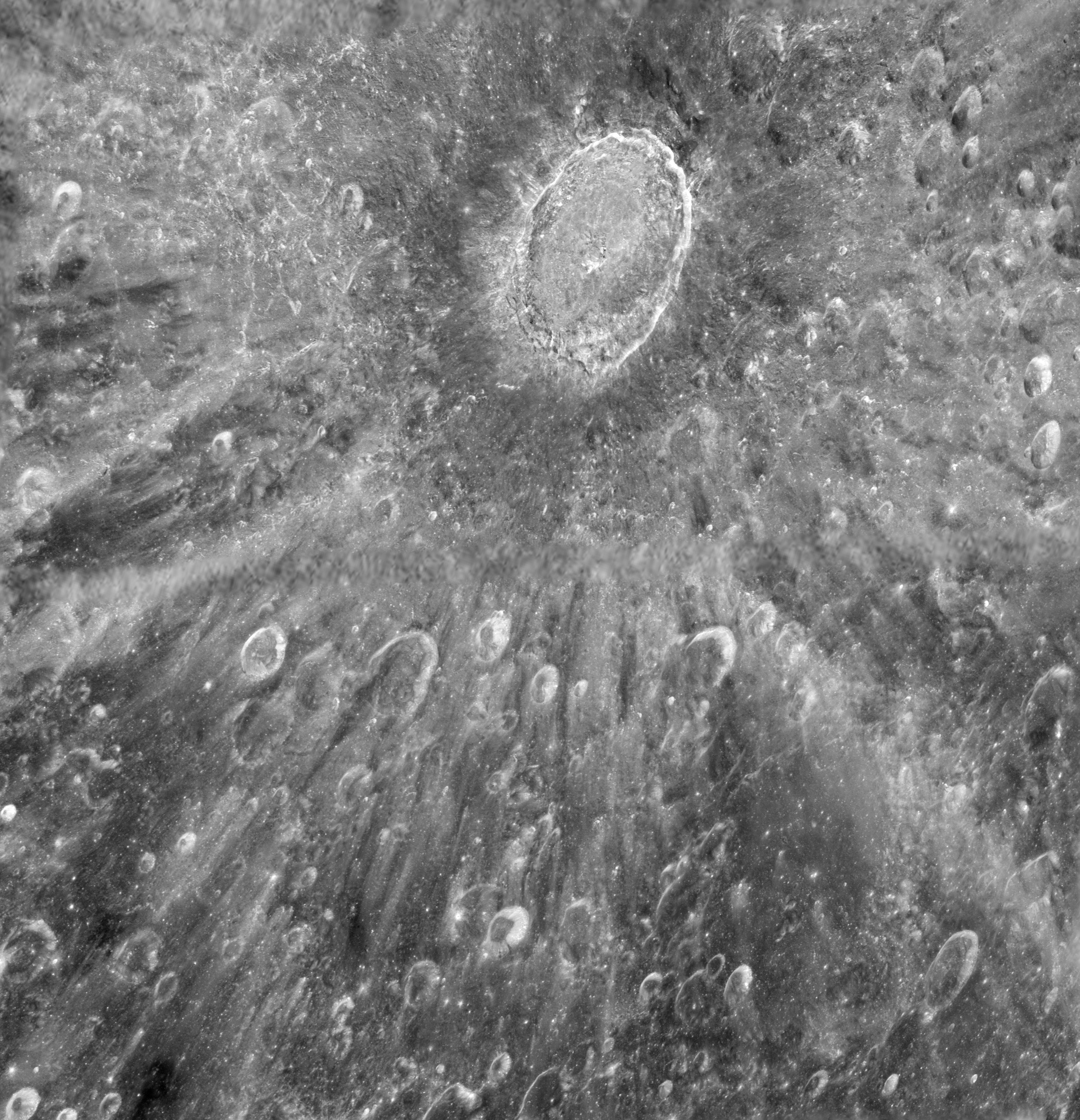
The large and relatively young lunar impact crater Tycho taken by the Hubble Space Telescope.

This is a list of named lunar craters, which are a small proportion of the overall crater population. Most of these features are impact craters; only some pertain to volcanism on the Moon. The crater nomenclature is governed by the International Astronomical Union, and this listing only includes features that are officially recognized by that scientific society.

List of craters on the Moon

- A
- B
- C
- D
- E
- F
- G
- H
- I
- J
- K
- L
- M
- N
- O
- P
- Q
- R
- S
- T
- U
- V
- W
- X
- Y
- Z

== Craters ==
The lunar craters are listed in the following subsections. Where a formation has associated satellite craters, these are detailed on the main crater description pages.

=== Catalog ===
Lunar craters are listed alphabetically on the following partial lists:

- List of craters on the Moon: A–B
- List of craters on the Moon: C–F
- List of craters on the Moon: G–K
- List of craters on the Moon: L–N
- List of craters on the Moon: O–Q
- List of craters on the Moon: R–S
- List of craters on the Moon: T–Z

=== Prominent craters ===
Locations and diameters of some prominent craters on the near side of the Moon:

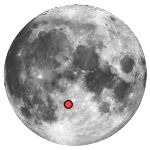
Albategnius (131 km)

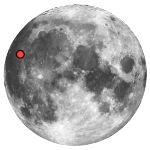
Aristarchus (40 km)

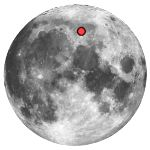
Aristoteles (88 km)

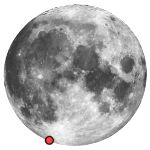
Bailly (301 km)

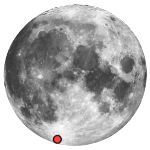
Clavius (231 km)

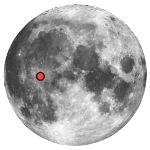
Copernicus (96 km)

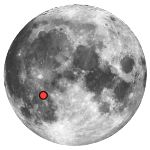
Fra Mauro (97 km)

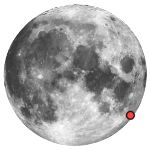
Humboldt (199 km)

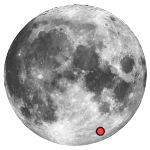
Janssen (201 km)

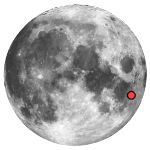
Langrenus (132 km)

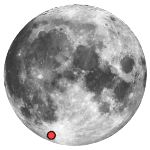
Longomontanus (146 km)

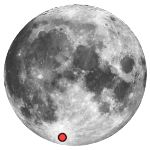
Maginus (156 km)

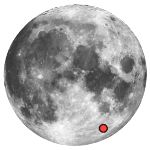
Metius (84 km)

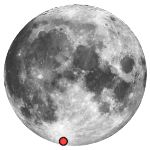
Moretus (114 km)

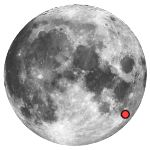
Petavius (184 km)

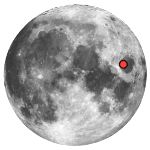
Picard (22 km)

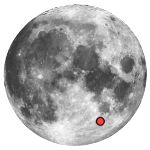
Piccolomini (88 km)

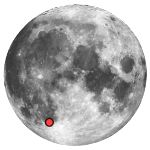
Pitatus (101 km)

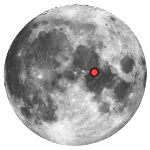
Plinius (41 km)

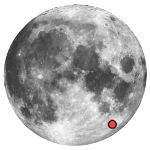
Rheita (71 km)

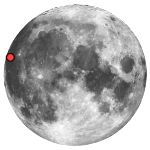
Russell (103 km)

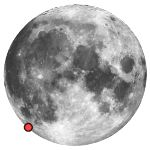
Schickard (212 km)

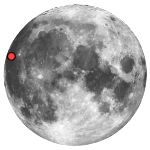
Seleucus (45 km)

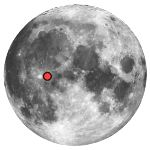
Stadius (68 km)

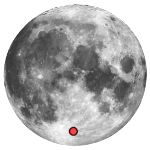
Stöfler (130 km)

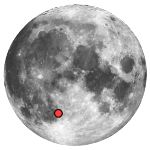
Thebit (55 km)

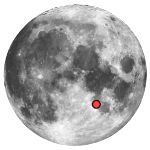
Theophilus (99 km)

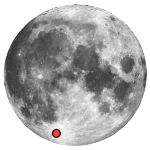
Tycho (85 km)

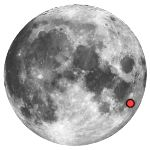
Vendelinus (141 km)

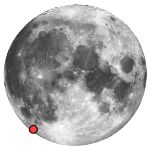
Wargentin (85 km)

== See also ==
- List of craters on the far side of the Moon
- List of craters on the Moon with fractured floors
- List of lunar features
- List of people with craters of the Moon named after them
  - List of lunar craters named for space explorers
- List of maria on the Moon
- List of mountains on the Moon
- List of valleys on the Moon
- Selenography
