= Lodygin (crater) =

Crater on the Moon

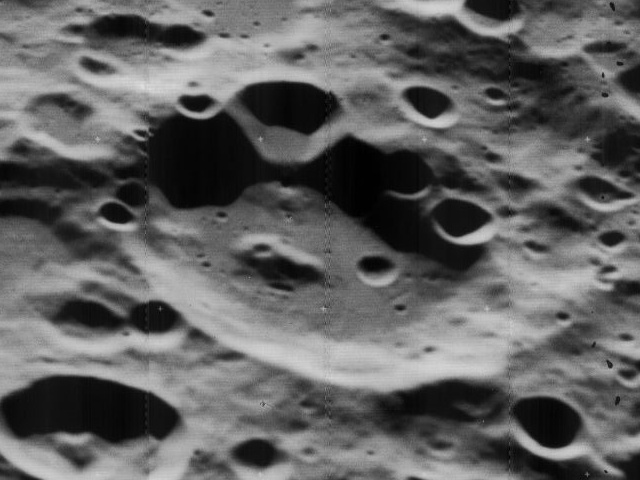
- Oblique Lunar Orbiter 5 image
- Coordinates: 17.7°S 146.8°W
- Diameter: 62 km
- Depth: Unknown
- Colongitude: 146° at sunrise
- Eponym: Alexander N. Lodygin

Lodygin is a lunar impact crater on the far side of the Moon, to the southeast of the much larger crater Galois. To the east-northeast is the crater Paschen, and to the south-southwest is the immense Apollo.

The outer rim of Lodygin has been heavily damaged along the western and northwestern sides, which lie closest to Galois. The rim along this face has been heavily modified and is overlain by multiple smaller craters. The remainder of the rim to the east and south are worn, but relatively intact. About half the original interior floor survives, and is marked only by a low central ridge offset to the south of the midpoint, and a few small or tiny impacts.

== Satellite craters ==
By convention these features are identified on lunar maps by placing the letter on the side of the crater midpoint that is closest to Lodygin.

Lodygin	Latitude	Longitude	Diameter
C	15.9° S	144.5° W	30 km
F	17.6° S	142.8° W	47 km
J	18.5° S	145.1° W	25 km
L	22.6° S	145.4° W	25 km
M	19.2° S	146.2° W	14 km
R	18.3° S	149.2° W	30 km
