= Lubbock (crater) =

Crater on the Moon

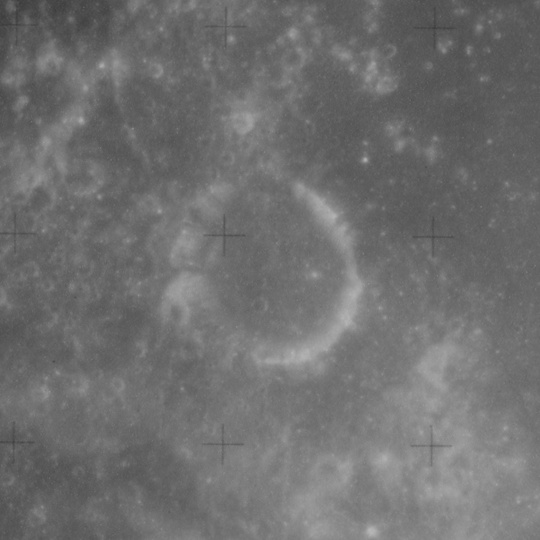
- Apollo 16 image at high sun angle
- Coordinates: 3.9°S 41.8°E
- Diameter: 13 km
- Depth: 0.6 km
- Colongitude: 318° at sunrise
- Eponym: Sir John Lubbock

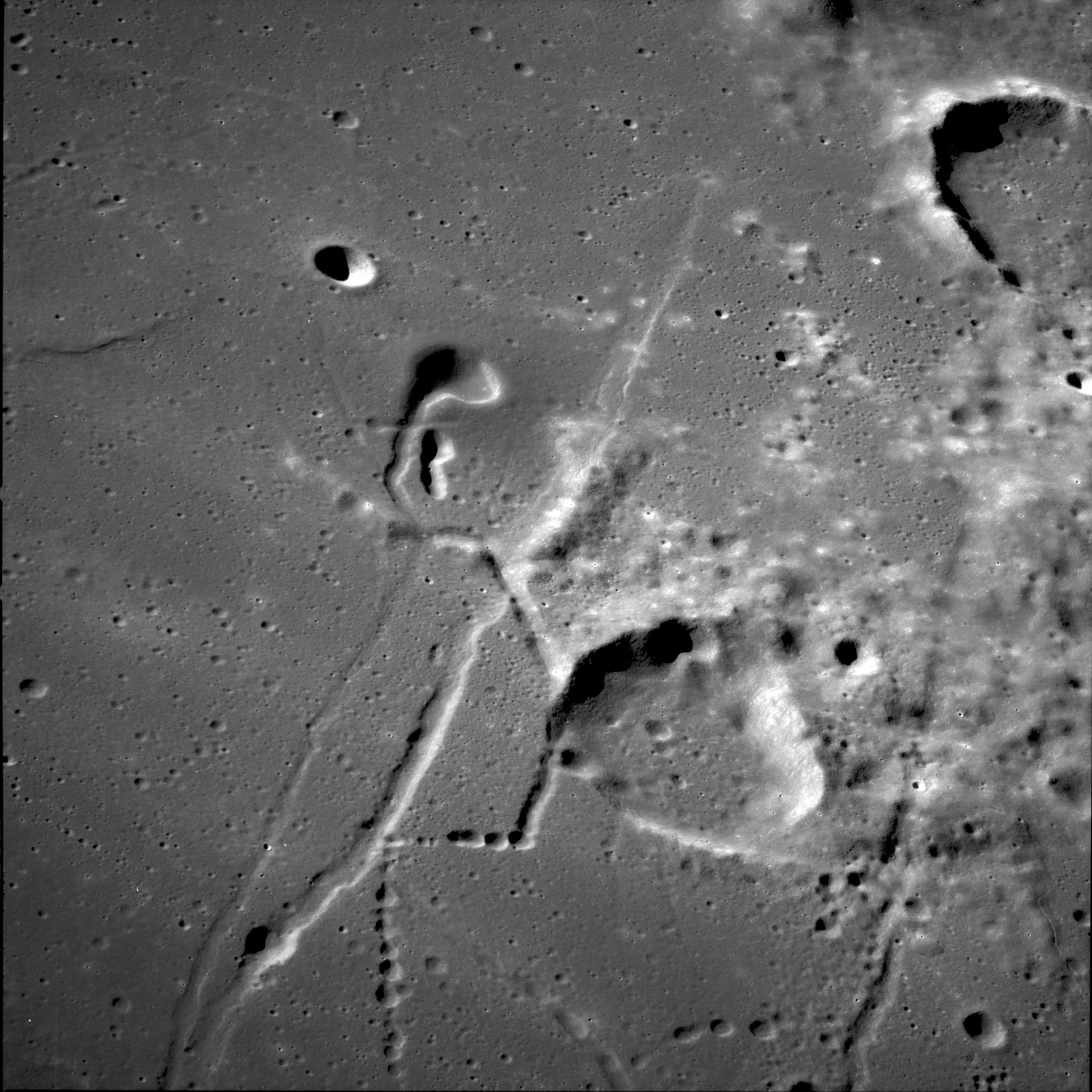
Vicinity of Lubbock H crater with intersecting rilles, and Lubbock in upper right, from Apollo 11

Lubbock is a small lunar impact crater on the western edge of Mare Fecunditatis. It was named after British astronomer John Lubbock. It is located to the north of the crater Gutenberg and south of Secchi. Lubbock is circular, with a low rim and flat interior. There is a small break in the eastern wall.

On the mare to the south of the patch of highland containing Lubbock is the rille system designated Rimae Goclenius. The parallel rays from the crater pair of Messier and Messier A reaches the rim of Lubbock H to the north.

== Satellite craters ==
By convention these features are identified on lunar maps by placing the letter on the side of the crater midpoint that is closest to Lubbock.

Lubbock	Latitude	Longitude	Diameter
C	4.8° S	39.8° E	8 km
D	4.5° S	39.1° E	13 km
G	3.7° S	39.2° E	10 km
H	2.6° S	41.8° E	10 km
K	5.1° S	38.3° E	7 km
L	4.9° S	39.3° E	7 km
M	0.3° S	38.6° E	19 km
N	1.5° S	39.7° E	26 km
P	2.9° S	39.5° E	7 km
R	0.1° S	40.4° E	24 km
S	0.7° N	41.2° E	24 km
