= Petrov (crater) =

Moon crater

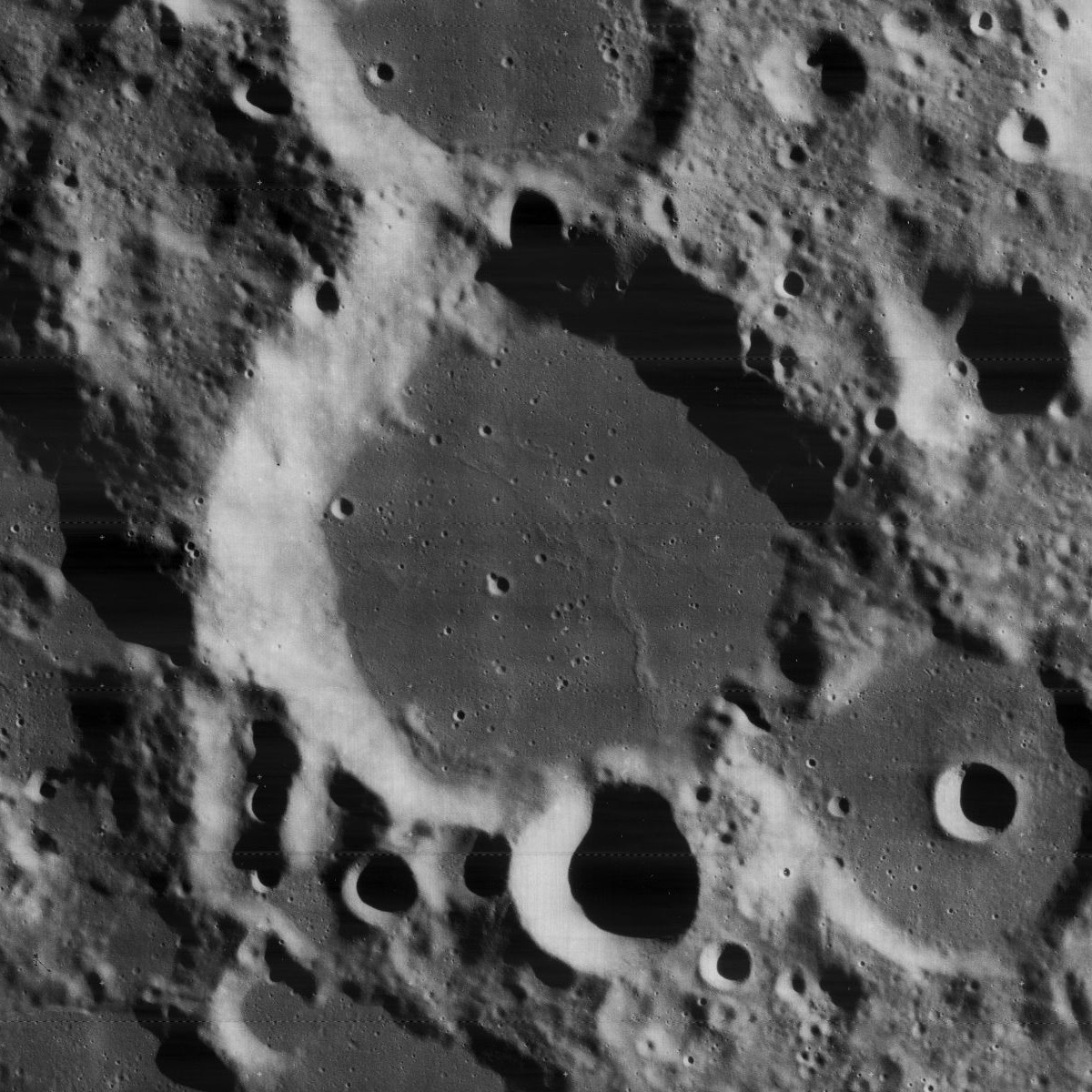
- Lunar Orbiter 4 image
- Coordinates: 61.4°S 88.0°E
- Diameter: 49 km
- Depth: Unknown
- Colongitude: 274° at sunrise
- Eponym: Evgenij S. Petrov

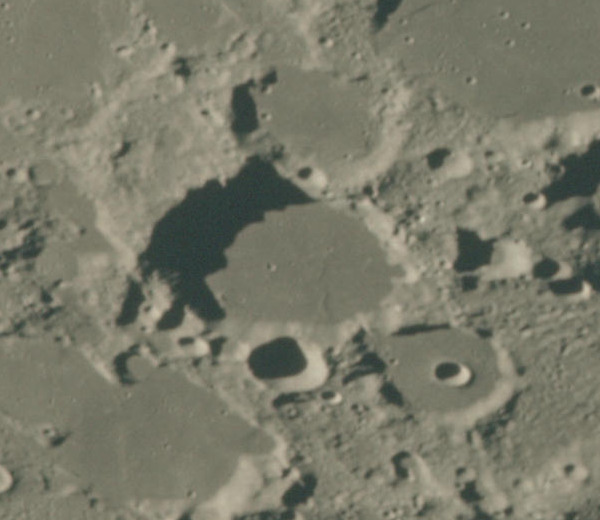
Oblique Apollo 15 image

Petrov is an impact crater along the southeastern limb of the Moon. The crater is difficult to observe in this location, and visibility of this feature is affected by libration. The nearest crater of note is Chamberlin, just on the far side to the northeast. Somewhat farther to the west-southwest of Petrov is Gill.

The rim of this crater has been worn and eroded by impacts, leaving an irregular ring of ridges and incisions along the inner wall. The smaller crater Petrov A intrudes slightly into the southern rim. Along the southeast, Petrov B is attached to the southeastern exterior and the two are joined by a narrow valley.

The interior floor of Petrov has been completely resurfaced by basaltic lava, leaving a low-albedo surface that is relatively smooth and featureless. This material is nearly as dark as the Mare Australe to the north. The floor is marked only by a few tiny craterlets.

== Satellite craters ==
By convention these features are identified on lunar maps by placing the letter on the side of the crater midpoint that is closest to Petrov.

Petrov	Latitude	Longitude	Diameter
A	62.5° S	88.3° E	17 km
B	62.3° S	90.5° E	31 km
