= Bosch (crater) =

Crater on the Moon

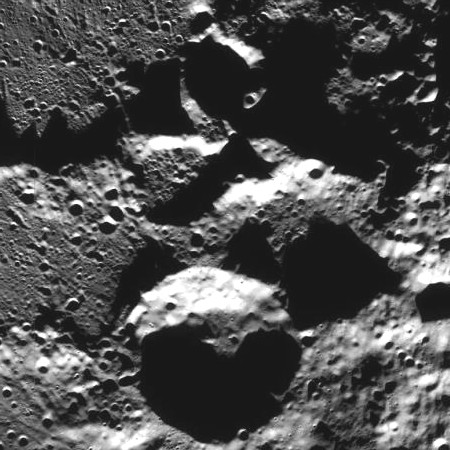
- Bosch is top center, with Rozhdestvenskiy U at bottom center
- Coordinates: 86.82°N 133.6°E
- Diameter: 19.58 km (12.17 mi)
- Depth: 1.18 km (0.73 mi)
- Colongitude: 190° at sunrise
- Eponym: Carl Bosch

Bosch is a small lunar impact crater near the North Pole on the far side of the Moon. It is located to the northeast of the large Rozhdestvenskiy crater. Bosch forms a doubly-shadowed cold trap with a temperature below 110 K, but it shows no evidence of accumulated water ice.

This crater was previously unnamed until it was given a designation by the IAU along with 18 other craters on January 22, 2009. It was named after German chemist and Nobel Prize winner Carl Bosch (1874-1940).
