= Walker (crater) =

Crater on the Moon

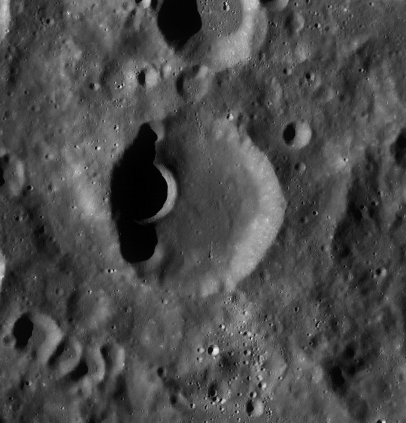
- Coordinates: 26.0°S 162.2°W
- Diameter: 32 km
- Depth: Unknown
- Colongitude: 162° at sunrise
- Eponym: Joseph Albert Walker

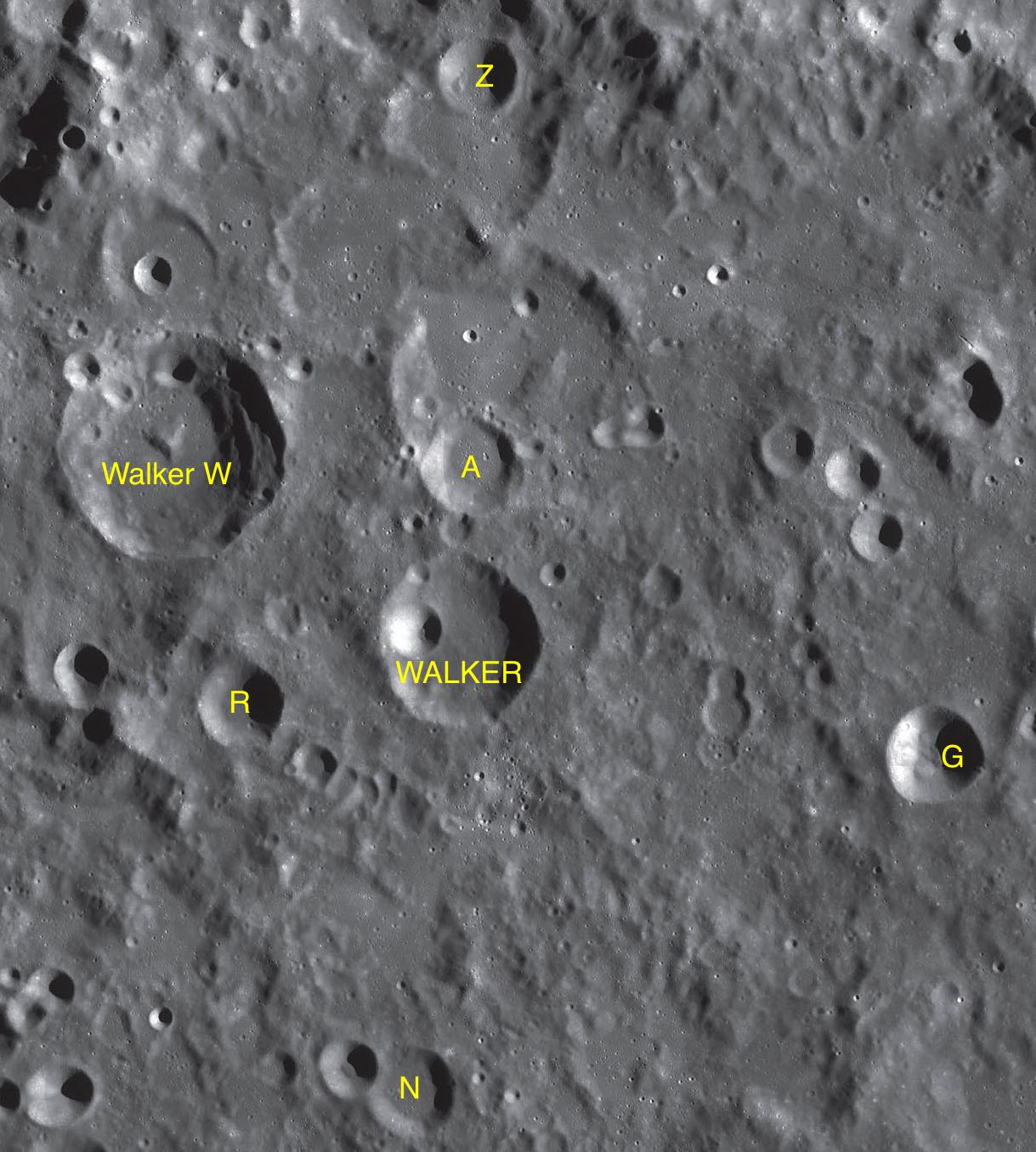
Satellite features

Walker is a lunar impact crater that lies on the far side of the Moon. It is located to the northwest of the huge walled plain Apollo. Walker lies equidistant between the craters Plummer to the east and Rumford to the west-southwest.

This crater is roughly circular, with an outer rim that has been slightly worn due to minor impacts. The northwestern rim in particular has merged with a smaller crater, and another impact lies on the interior floor along the west-northwestern inner wall.

== Satellite craters ==
By convention these features are identified on lunar maps by placing the letter on the side of the crater midpoint that is closest to Walker.

Walker	Latitude	Longitude	Diameter
A	24.9° S	162.0° W	20 km
G	26.9° S	158.8° W	20 km
N	29.0° S	162.6° W	17 km
R	26.5° S	163.8° W	17 km
W	24.6° S	164.3° W	44 km
Z	22.4° S	161.9° W	16 km
