= Laveran (crater) =

Crater on the Moon

- Coordinates: 81.9°S 160.6°W
- Diameter: 12.6 km
- Eponym: Charles Louis Alphonse Laveran

Laveran is a lunar impact crater located on the lunar far side near the southern pole. The crater is located in between the prominent craters Schrödinger, Zeeman, Ashbrook, and South of De Forest. Laveran was adopted and named after French physician Charles Louis Alphonse Laveran by the IAU in 2009.
