= Sergei Vladimirovich Orlov =

Sergei Orlov
- Сергей Орлов
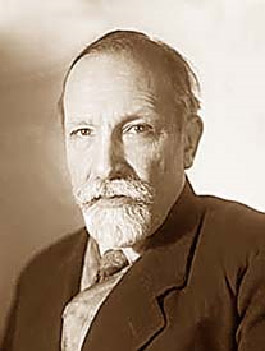
- Born: 6 August [O.S. 18 August] 1880; Perm, Russian Empire
- Died: January 12, 1958 (aged 77); Moscow, Soviet Union
- Resting place: Novodevichy Cemetery
- Education: Imperial Moscow University
- Occupation: Astrophysicist
- Awards: Stalin Prize; Order of Lenin; Medal "For Valiant Labour in the Great Patriotic War 1941–1945"
- Scientific career
- Workplaces: Sternberg Astronomical Institute; Perm State University
- Academic advisors: Fyodor Bredikhin

Sergei Vladimirovich Orlov (Сергей Владимирович Орлов; 18 August 1880 – 12 January 1958) was an astrophysicist. His main work was on cometary orbits, origins, forms and classifications. He contributed to mathematical approaches to predicting the variation in cometary brightness and intensity along its orbit.

Orlov was born in Moscow, the son of a physician. He joined Moscow University in 1899 and became interested in astronomy, working at the observatory after graduating in 1904. He was conscripted into the Russo-Japanese war as an artillery officer and returned to teach at the First Gymnasium from 1906 while also studying the orbits of comets in his spare time. He joined army service again between 1914 and 1917 and returned injured to continue teaching mathematics and physics. He became a professor at the Perm State University in 1920 working for two years before he joined the State Astrophysical Institute in 1922. In 1926 he became a professor at Moscow State University where he taught astrophysics. He continued his studies on comets, developing on the work of F.A. Bredikhin. He noted the relationship of cometary brightness to solar activity and his approach to predicting brightness variations through its orbit is in wide use. His theory was that comets were formed by collisions between asteroids. His analysis of cometary gas compositions using spectroscopy enabled him to identify nickel.
