= Marco Polo (crater) =

Lunar impact crater

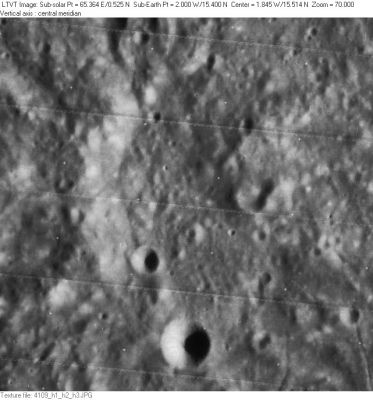
- Coordinates: 15.4°N 2.0°W
- Diameter: 28 × 21 km
- Depth: 1.1 km
- Colongitude: 2° at sunrise
- Eponym: Marco Polo

Marco Polo is a lunar impact crater that is located in the rugged foothills to the south of the Montes Apenninus mountain range. It was named after Italian explorer Marco Polo. It lies just 20 kilometers to the west of the Mare Vaporum, but is otherwise located in an undistinguished region of terrain with no notable craters nearby.

This crater is elongated to the south-southeast, with a very eroded outer rim. The southern part of the rim is nearly nonexistent, and there is a narrow cleft at the northern end of the crater. Portions of the rim still remain along the western and northeastern sides, but appear as little more than curved ridges. The interior has little detail of interest apart from a tiny craterlet along the southwest inner wall.

== Satellite craters ==
By convention these features are identified on lunar maps by placing the letter on the side of the crater midpoint that is closest to Marco Polo.

Marco Polo	Latitude	Longitude	Diameter
A	14.9° N	2.0° W	7 km
B	17.2° N	1.9° W	7 km
C	14.0° N	5.0° W	7 km
D	15.0° N	3.7° W	6 km
F	15.7° N	4.5° W	4 km
G	16.7° N	1.9° W	5 km
H	17.8° N	1.7° W	6 km
J	17.9° N	1.2° W	5 km
K	18.2° N	1.4° W	10 km
L	14.8° N	5.0° W	19 km
M	17.6° N	1.1° W	37 km
P	16.9° N	0.2° W	31 km
S	17.8° N	0.0° E	21 km
T	13.6° N	1.0° W	3 km
