= Ludwig (crater) =

Crater on the Moon

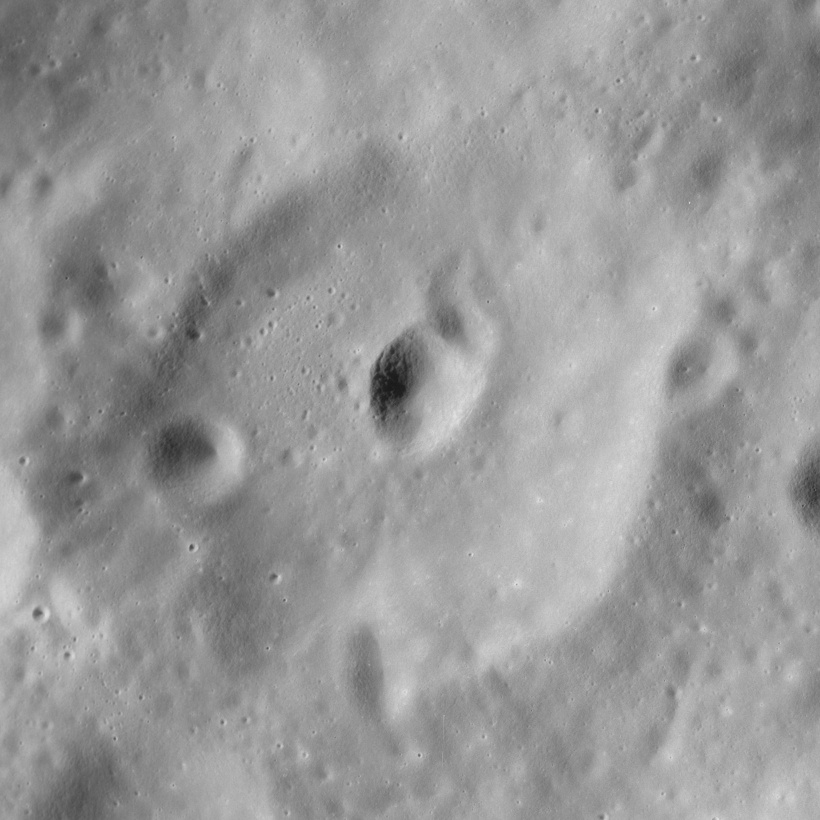
- Apollo 12 image
- Coordinates: 7.7°S 97.4°E
- Diameter: 23 km
- Depth: 0.9 km
- Colongitude: 187° at sunrise
- Eponym: Carl F. W. Ludwig

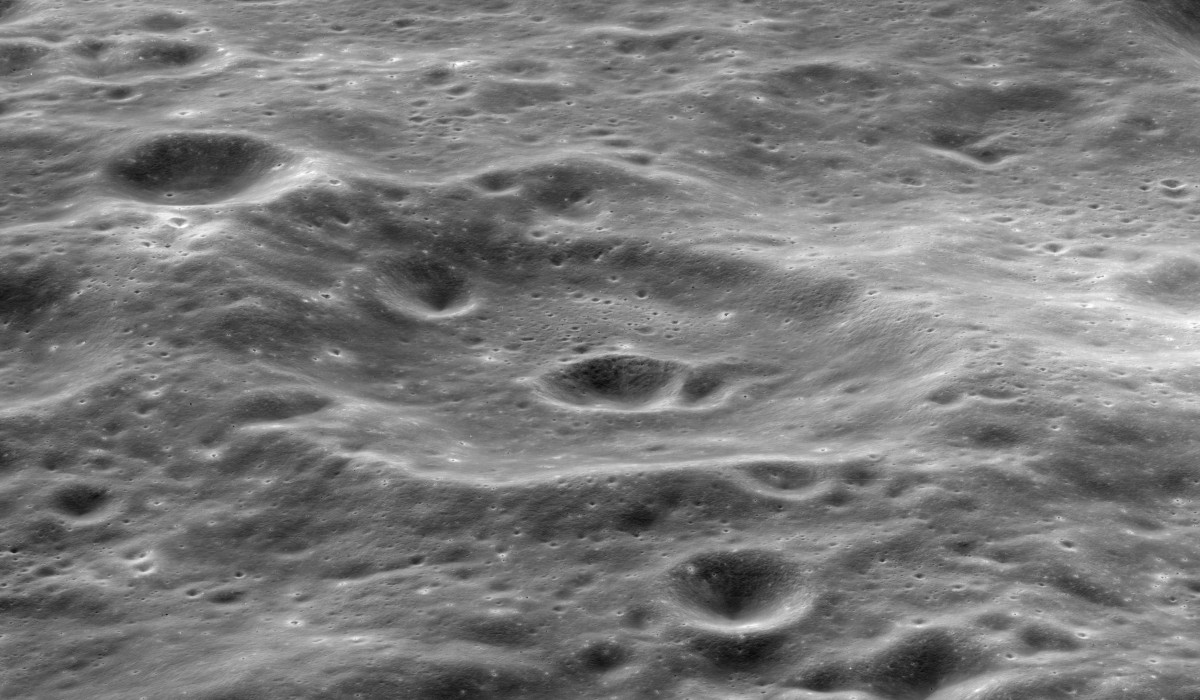
Oblique view from Apollo 17, facing west

Ludwig is a small lunar impact crater that is located just beyond the eastern limb of the Moon, placing it on the far side from the Earth. It lies just to the east of the much larger crater Hirayama, and to the north of Ganskiy.

The rim of this crater is worn, and is somewhat lower in the northern half. The inner walls are uneven slopes that lead down to the interior floor. Three small craters lie on the floor, with a joined pair located to the north of the midpoint and the other along the southwest inner wall. The floor is otherwise relatively level and featureless.
