= Theiler (crater) =

Crater on the Moon

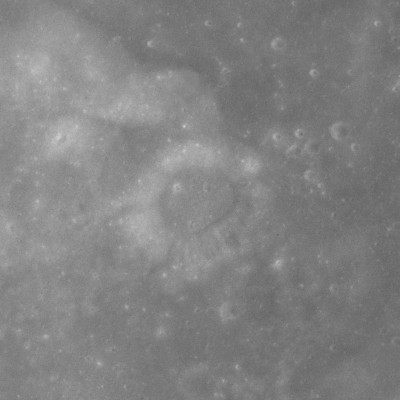
- Apollo 17 Mapping Camera image
- Coordinates: 13.35°N 82.81°E
- Diameter: 9 km
- Depth: Unknown
- Colongitude: 277° at sunrise
- Eponym: Max Theiler

Theiler is a tiny lunar impact crater on the eastern lunar limb, in the western Mare Marginis. To the southeast is the prominent walled plain named Neper. Due to its location, Theiler is not always visible to observers on the Earth because of the effects of the Moon's libration. Theiler is a circular, bowl-shaped formation of no particular significance.
