= Leucippus (crater) =

Crater on the Moon

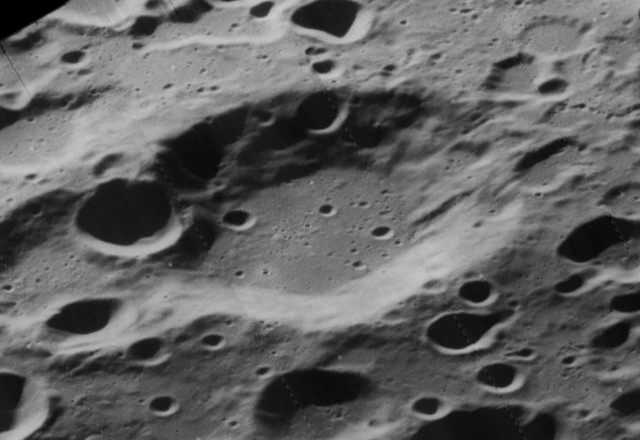
- Oblique Lunar Orbiter 5 image, facing west
- Coordinates: 29.1°N 116.0°W
- Diameter: 56 km
- Depth: Unknown
- Colongitude: 116° at sunrise
- Eponym: Leucippus

Leucippus is a crater on the Moon's far side. It is relatively isolated from other named craters, although it is located just over one crater diameter to the south-southeast of the huge walled plain named Landau. To the southwest of Leucippus is the larger satellite crater Leucippus Q.

The rim of Leucippus is eroded, with a smaller crater laid across the southern end. A small craterlet lies along the western inner wall. The edge and inner wall is generally lacking in detail, forming a relatively smooth, gentle slope down to the interior floor. This interior is offset slightly to the southeast, where the inner wall is narrower. The floor is about half the diameter of the crater. There is a small craterlet on the floor along the southern edge, and a few tiny craterlets mark the otherwise relatively level surface.

== Satellite craters ==
By convention these features are identified on lunar maps by placing the letter on the side of the crater midpoint that is closest to Leucippus.

Leucippus	Latitude	Longitude	Diameter
F	29.1° N	113.0° W	19 km
K	27.2° N	115.0° W	14 km
Q	25.9° N	118.8° W	84 km
X	33.4° N	118.8° W	36 km
