= Bandfield (crater) =

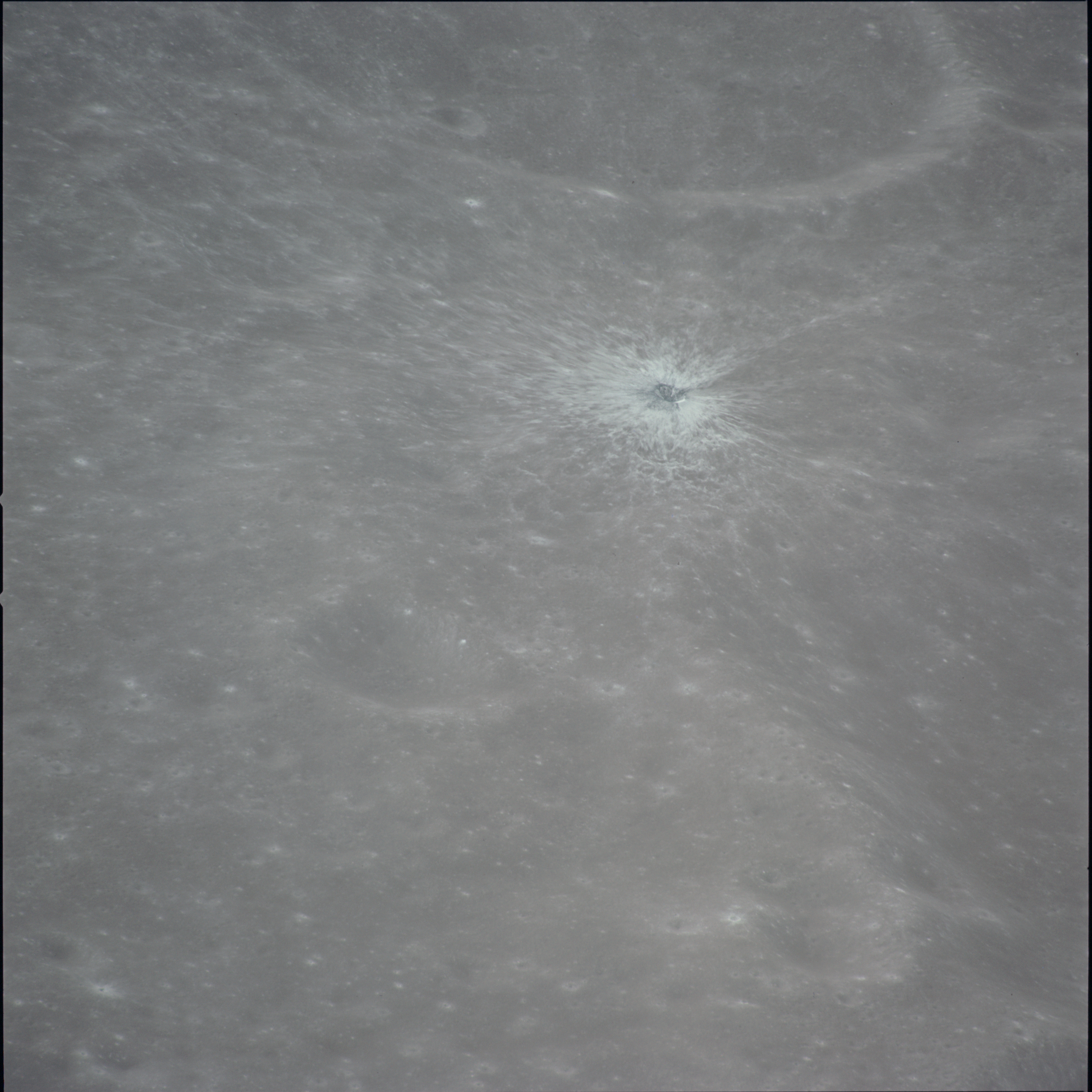
- Apollo 14 image
- Coordinates: 5.40°S 90.77°E
- Diameter: 1.0 km (0.62 mi)
- Depth: 0.1 km (110 yd)
- Formation: Copernican
- Eponym: Joshua Bandfield

Bandfield is a tiny lunar impact crater that is located nearly on the border of the near side and far side of the Moon. It lies close to the west rim of the crater Hirayama, near Hume and Swasey, on the southwest edge of Mare Smythii. Only a kilometer in diameter, this crater has a bright system of rays. Hence it is young, being dated to the Copernican age of the lunar geologic timescale. It is one of over 2,000 lunar cold spots.

The crater's name was approved by the IAU on 8 July 2022. It is named after the American planetary scientist Joshua Bandfield (1974–2019). Bandfield worked on instruments on many spacecraft including OSIRIS-REx, 2001 Mars Odyssey, Mars Reconnaissance Orbiter, Lunar Reconnaissance Orbiter, Mars Global Surveyor, and Mars Exploration Rovers.

== Gallery ==
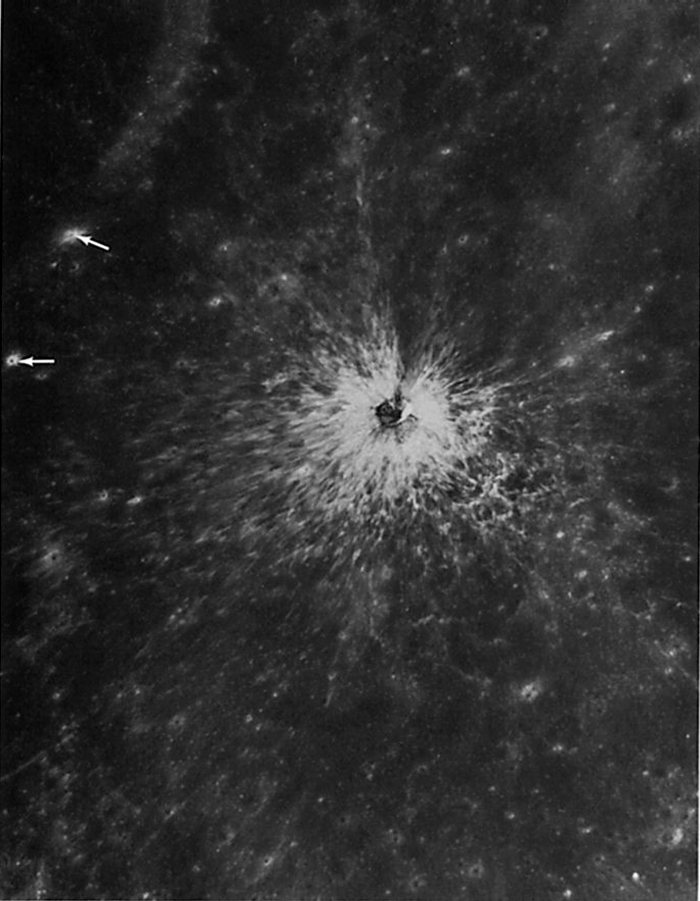
Bandfield from orbit

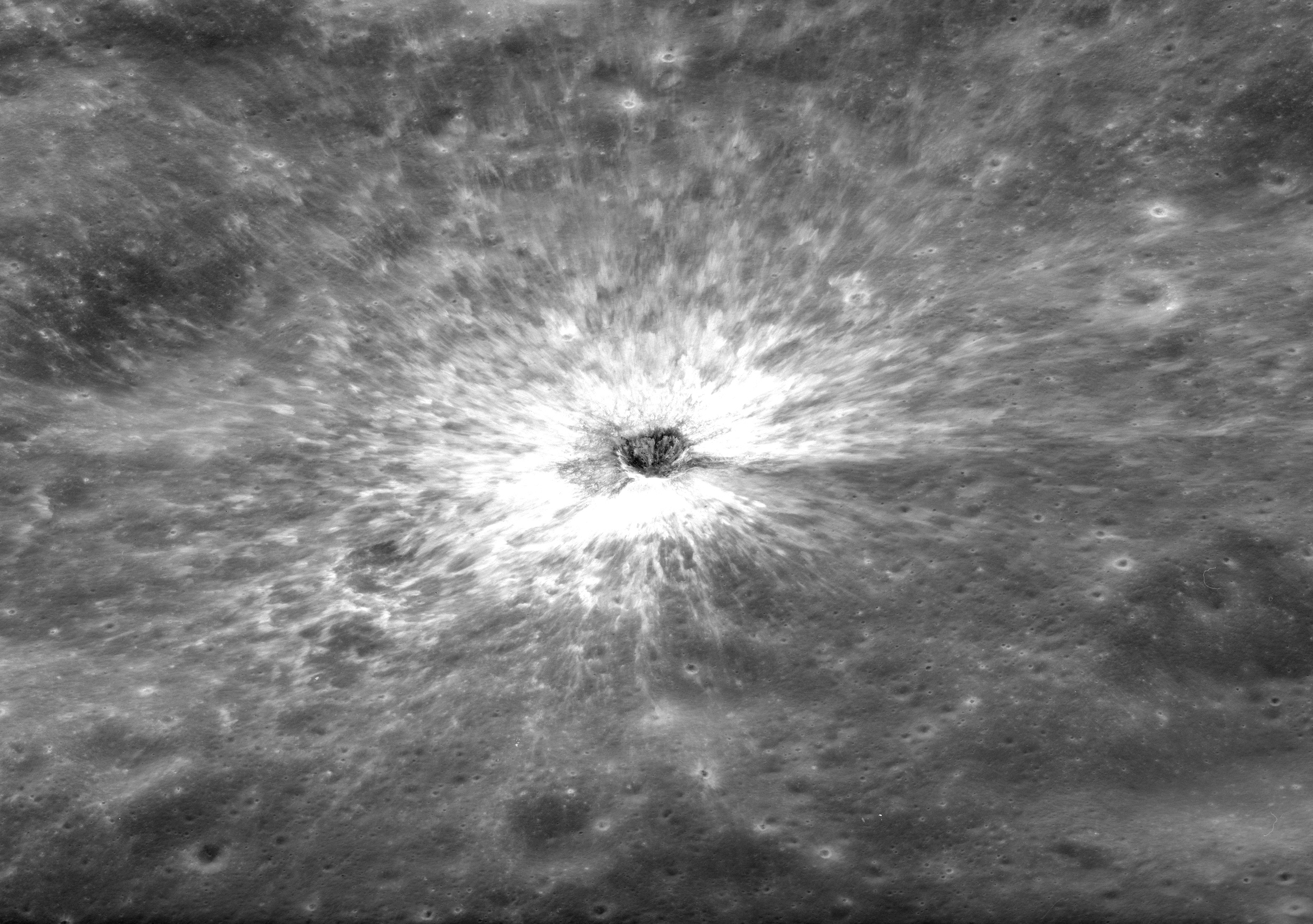
Apollo 17 image
