= Lebesgue (crater) =

Crater on the Moon

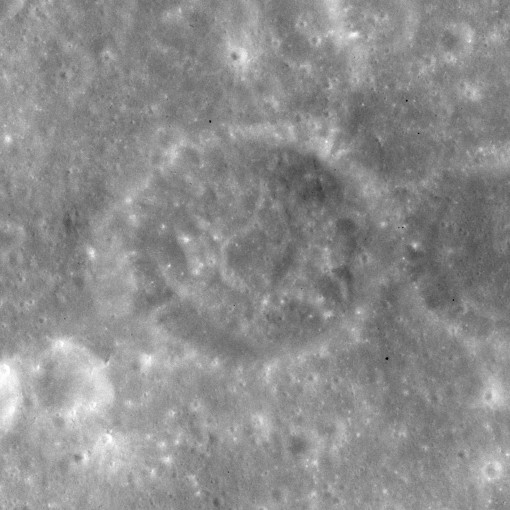
- Apollo 15 mapping camera image
- Coordinates: 5.14°S 88.97°E
- Diameter: 11.39 km
- Depth: 0.56 km
- Colongitude: 272° at sunrise
- Eponym: Henri Lebesgue

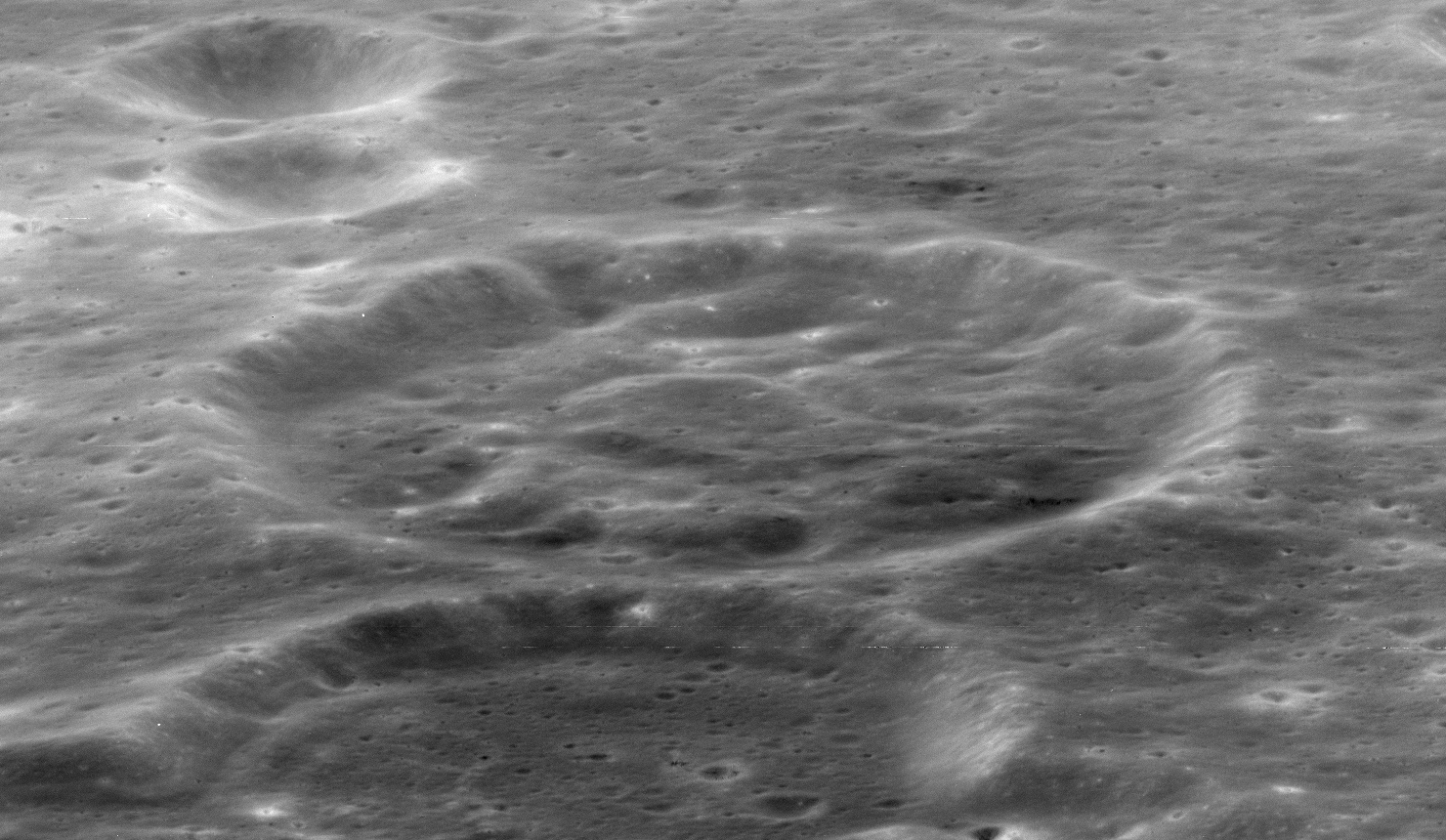
Oblique view from Apollo 17

Lebesgue is a small lunar impact crater that is located near the eastern limb of the Moon. It lies in the southeastern part of the Mare Smythii, to the southeast of the crater Warner. The southeastern rim of Lebesgue is attached to a small crater that overlays the northwest rim of Swasey, so that the three form a short crater chain. The floor of Lebesgue is hummocky.

The crater's name was approved by the IAU in 1976.
