= Joshua Bandfield =

American planetary scientist (1974–2019)

- Born: July 16, 1974; Boise, Idaho, U.S.
- Died: June 13, 2019 (aged 44); Boise, Idaho, U.S.
- Known for: Cold spot Bandfield crater

Academic background
- Education: University of California, Santa Barbara (BS); Arizona State University (PhD)
- Thesis: Isolation and characterization of Martian atmospheric constituents and surface lithologies using thermal infrared spectroscopy (2000)
- Doctoral advisor: Phil Christensen

Academic work
- Institutions: University of Washington; Space Science Institute
- Main interests: Geology of Mars; planetary science; thermal infrared spectroscopy; remote sensing; space exploration

Joshua L. Bandfield (July 16, 1974 – June 13, 2019) was an American planetary scientist. He was a co-investigator for the Thermal Emission Imaging System (THEMIS) on NASA's 2001 Mars Odyssey orbiter and the Diviner Lunar Radiometer Experiment (DLRE) on NASA's Lunar Reconnaissance Orbiter in 2009.

Bandfield discovered lunar cold spots using DLRE data, identifying over 2,000 on the moon’s surface. On July 8, 2022, the International Astronomical Union (IAU) named Bandfield Crater, a prominent cold spot, in his honor.

== Biography ==
Bandfield earned a Bachelor of Science in geology and Earth system science from the University of California, Santa Barbara in 1996. He attended Arizona State University (ASU), earning a doctorate in geology under Phil Christensen in 2000. In his thesis, he used infrared spectroscopy data to characterize the Martian surface lithology and atmosphere composition.

After graduating, Bandfield joined NASA as a postdoctoral researcher at Ames Research Center in 2000 followed by Goddard Space Flight Center until 2002. He returned to ASU as a principal research specialist on the Mars Space Flight Facility and taught at nearby Chandler–Gilbert Community College for three years. At ASU, he was involved with the Mars Reconnaissance Orbiter aerobraking advisory group and aided in landing site characterization for Mars Scout Phoenix. Bandfield also worked on the Mars Exploration Rover and the thermal emission spectrometer on the Mars Global Surveyor and 2001 Mars Odyssey.

In 2008, he became a research associate professor at the University of Washington. Bandfield was a co-investigator on the Diviner Lunar Radiometer Experiment (DLRE) on the Lunar Reconnaissance Orbiter and the Mars climate sounder on the Mars Reconnaissance Orbiter. Using DLRE data, Bandfield discovered more than 2,000 young lunar craters (0.1–1 Mya) with abnormally cold surface temperatures (3–10 Kelvin cooler than surrounding regolith) extending past their crater rims.

Bandfield was appointed a senior research scientist at the Space Science Institute in Boulder, Colorado in 2013. He was a spacecraft operator for OSIRIS-REx. He passed away unexpectedly in June of 2019, aged 45.

On July 8, 2022, the International Astronomical Union (IAU) named a 1 km (0.62 mi) diameter lunar crater southwest of Mare Smythii, one of the most prominent cold spots on the moon, Bandfield crater in his honor.
