= Talbot (crater) =

Crater on the Moon

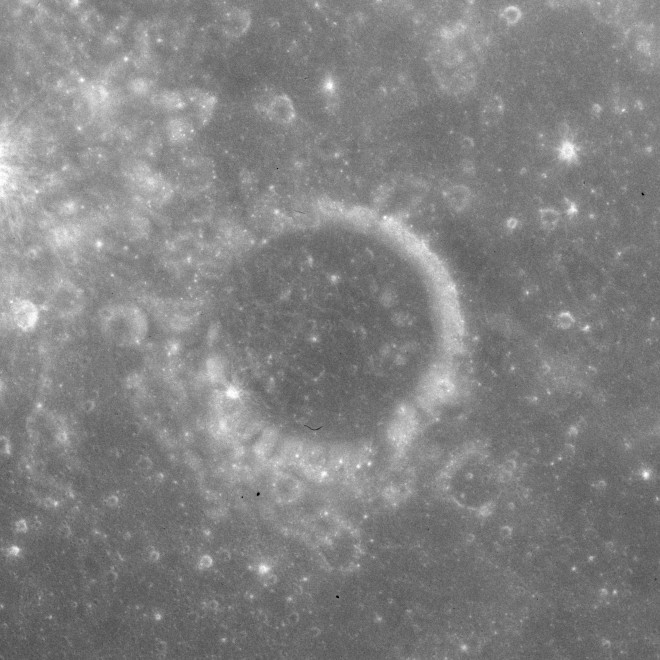
- Apollo 15 mapping camera image
- Coordinates: 2.47°S 85.30°E
- Diameter: 12.36 km
- Depth: 0.41 km
- Colongitude: 275° at sunrise
- Eponym: William H. F. Talbot

Talbot is a small lunar impact crater on the Mare Smythii, near the eastern limb of the Moon. It lies between a pair of larger, flooded craters, with Runge to the west and Haldane to the west-northwest. The crater is entirely surrounded by the dark lunar mare. It is a circular, bowl-shaped formation with an almost featureless interior floor. The outer rim has a slightly higher albedo than the surrounding terrain, but the floor is as dark as the mare.

The crater's name was approved by the IAU in 1976.
