= Runge (crater) =

Crater on the Moon

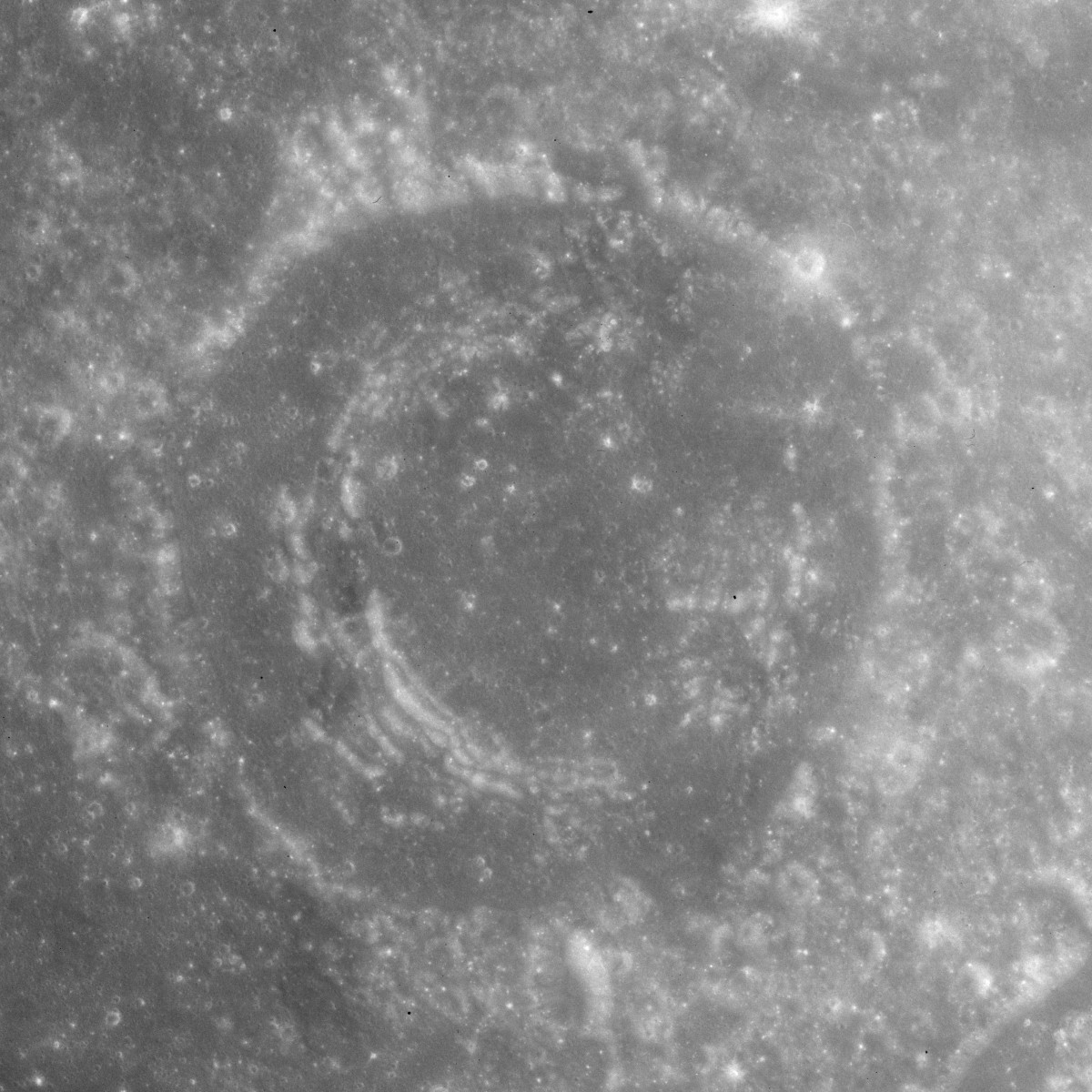
- Apollo 15 mapping camera image
- Coordinates: 2.43°S 86.81°E
- Diameter: 38.98 km
- Depth: 0.59 km
- Colongitude: 274° at sunrise
- Eponym: Carl D. T. Runge

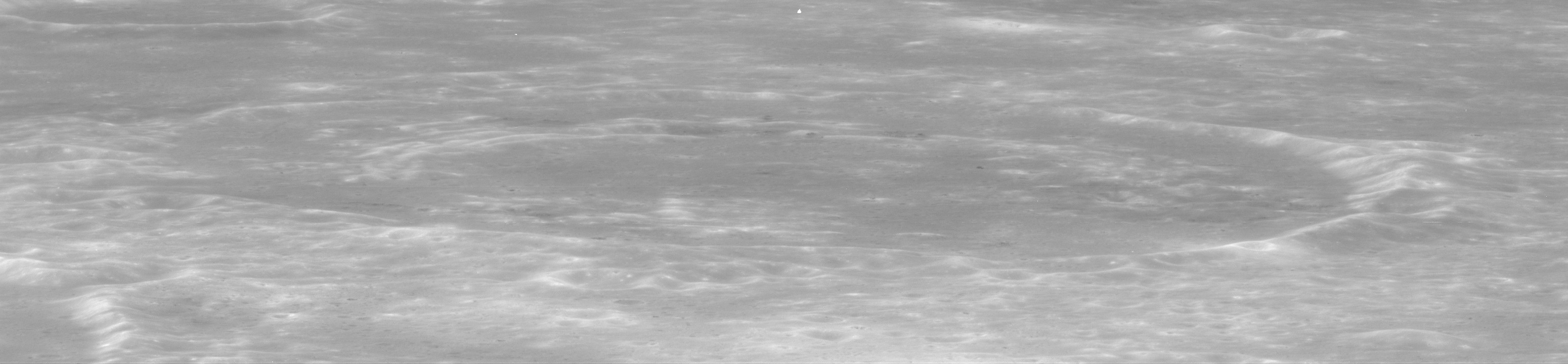
Oblique view from Apollo 17

Runge is a lunar impact crater in the Mare Smythii, along the eastern edge of the Moon. It lies less than one crater diameter to the north-northwest of the very similar crater Warner. To the west-northwest is Haldane, and due west is the smaller Talbot.

Runge is a floor-fractured crater which has been almost completely submerged by basaltic lava, leaving only a low, ring-shaped feature in the lunar mare. The rim has a gap at the southern end, and a pair of small craters lie near the exterior to either side of this opening. The depth of Runge from the lowest point in the northeastern quadrant to the highest point along the southern rim is approximately 590 meters.

The crater's name was approved by the IAU in 1973.
