= Hume (crater) =

Crater on the Moon

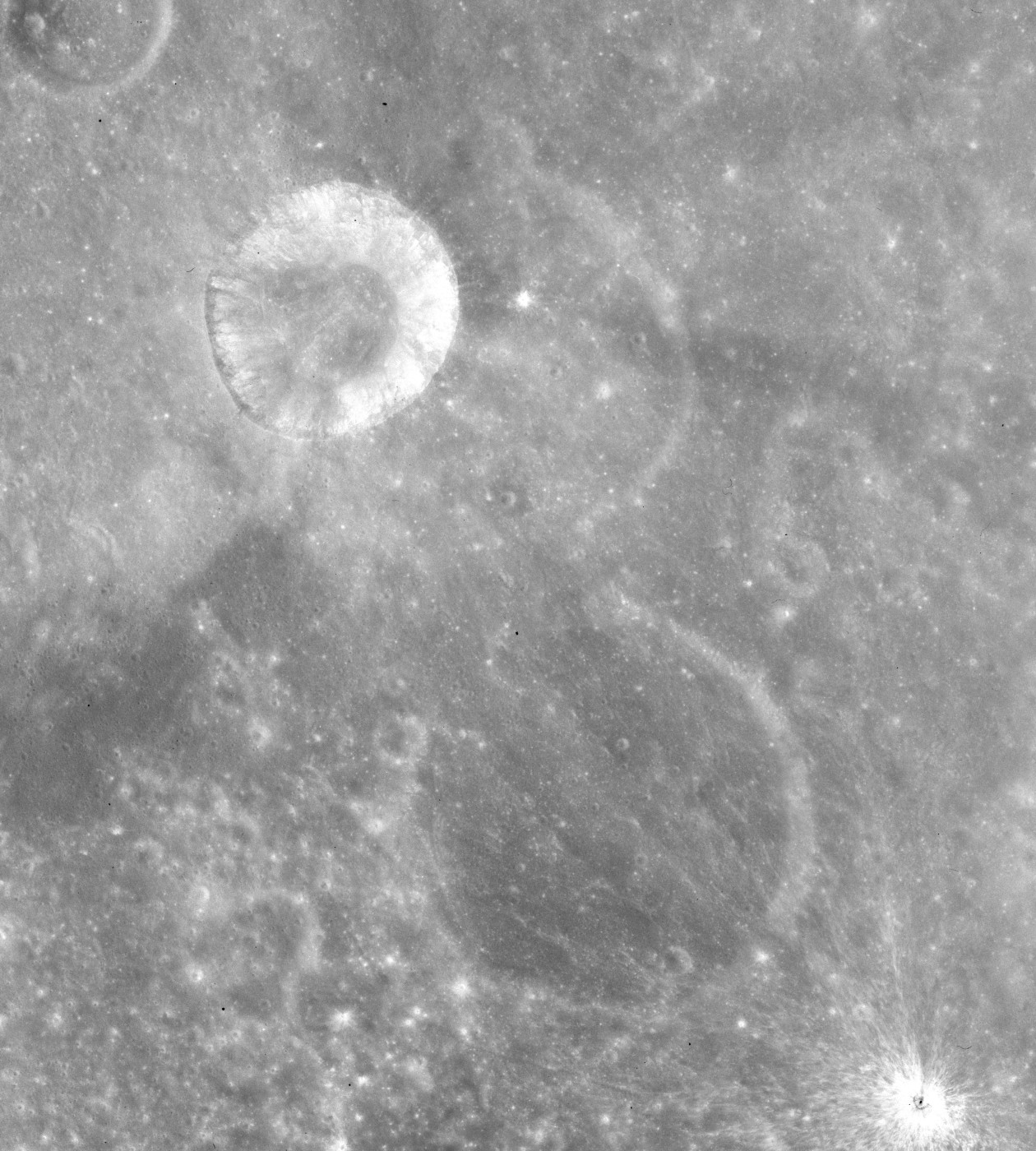
- Apollo 15 mapping camera image, with Hume below center, Hume A above center, and Hume Z above left of center
- Coordinates: 4.7°S 90.4°E
- Diameter: 23 km
- Depth: 0.65 km
- Colongitude: 270° at sunrise
- Eponym: David Hume

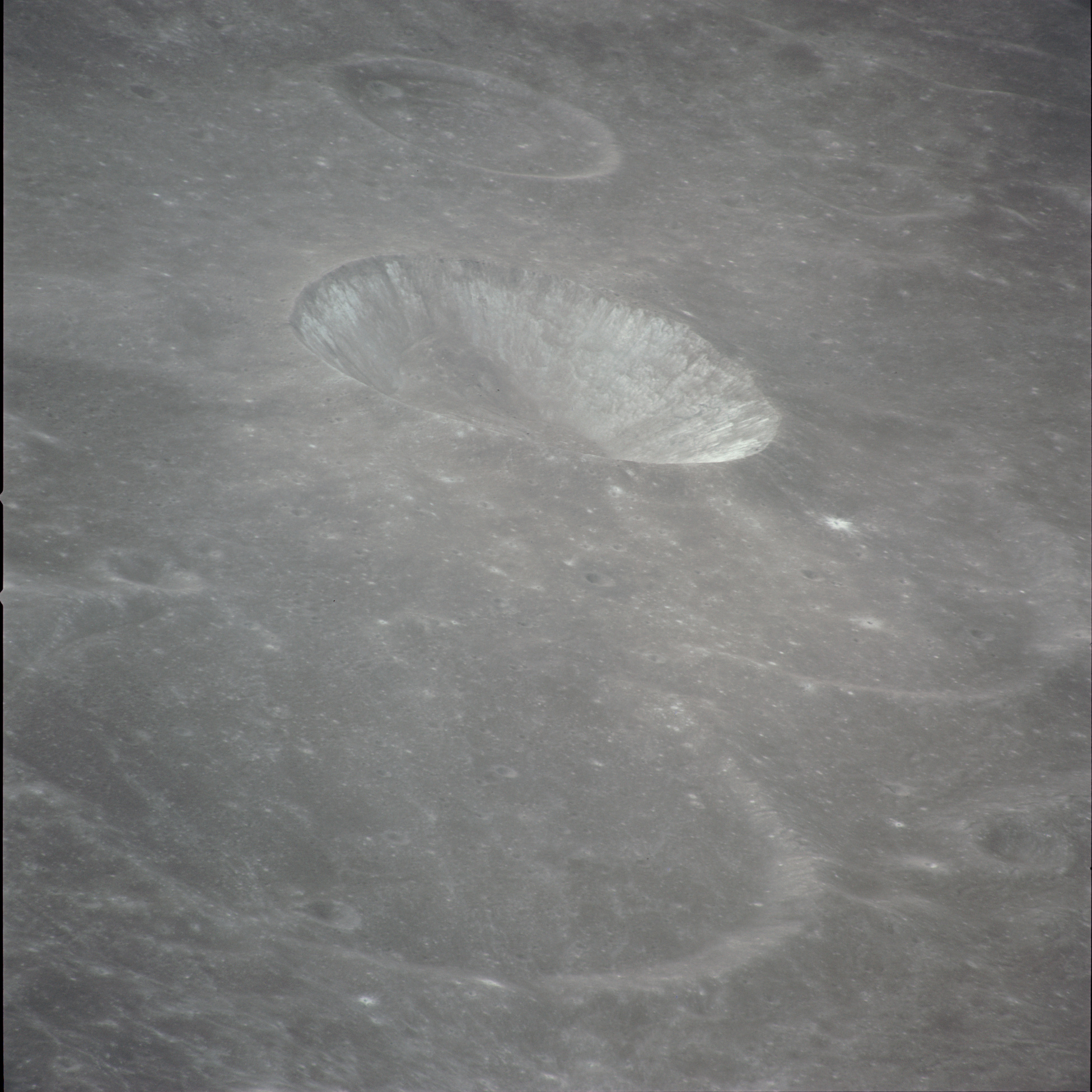
Oblique Apollo 14 image, with Hume in foreground, Hume A at right, and Hume Z above center

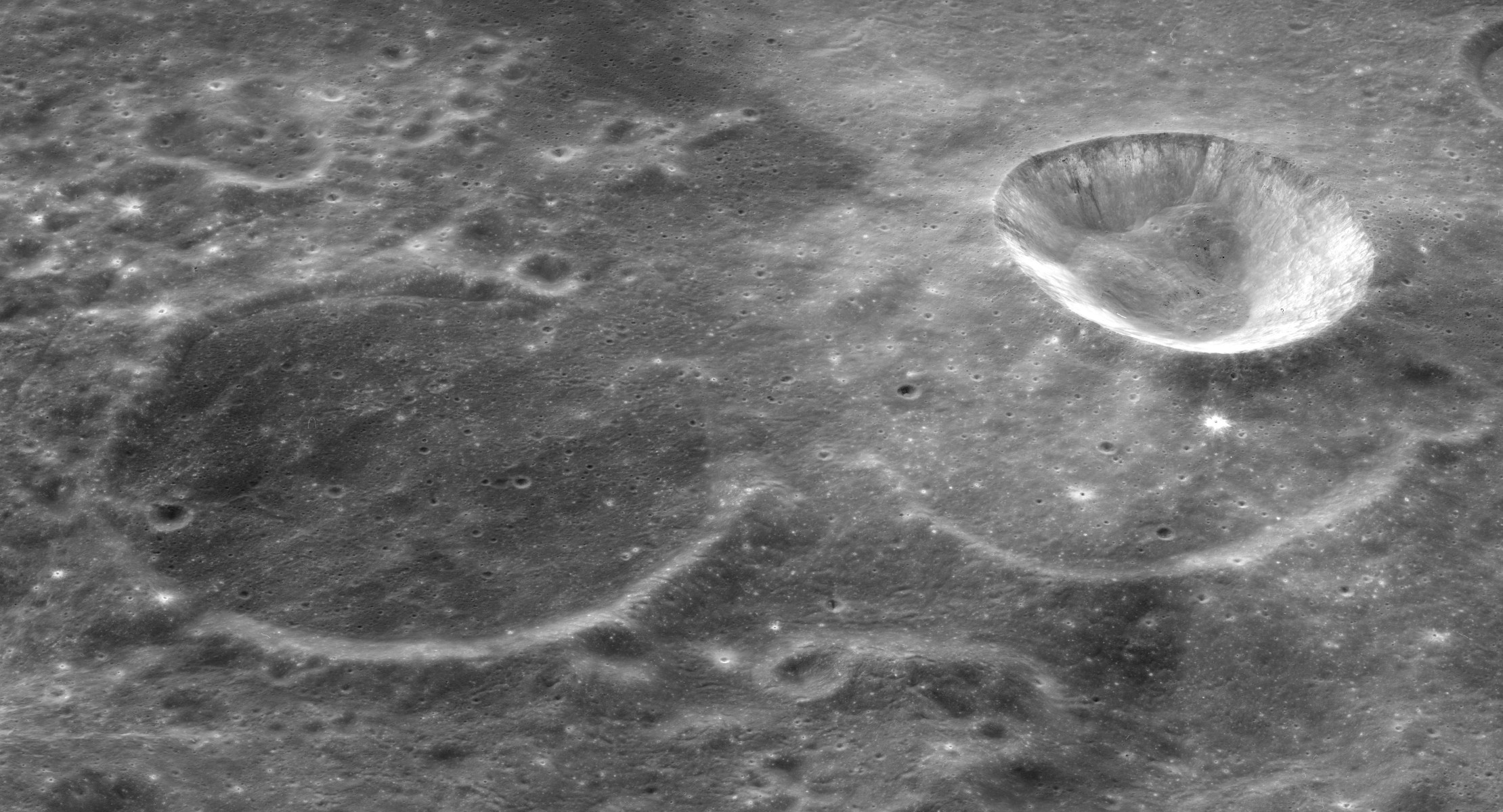
Similar view from Apollo 17

Hume is a small lunar impact crater that lies along the eastern limb of the Moon, along the southeast edge of Mare Smythii. It is located just on the far side of the Moon, but it is often brought into sight from Earth due to libration. Hume lies just to the west-northwest of the much larger Hirayama, and to the northeast of the flooded crater Swasey.

Hume has been flooded by flows of basaltic lava, leaving only a slender rim projecting above the surface. Its interior floor is level and has the same low albedo as the lunar mare to the northwest. The rim has a wide gap at the northern end, and the floor lies open to the exterior. This feature is not marked by any overlying impacts of note.

Hume is about 650 meters deep when measured from the high point on the southeast rim to the low point on the crater floor.

== Satellite craters ==
By convention, these features are identified on lunar maps by placing the letter on the side of the crater midpoint that is closest to Hume.

Hume	Latitude	Longitude	Diameter
A	3.8° S	90.6° E	25 km
Z	3.6° S	90.4° E	14 km
