= Warner (crater) =

Crater on the Moon

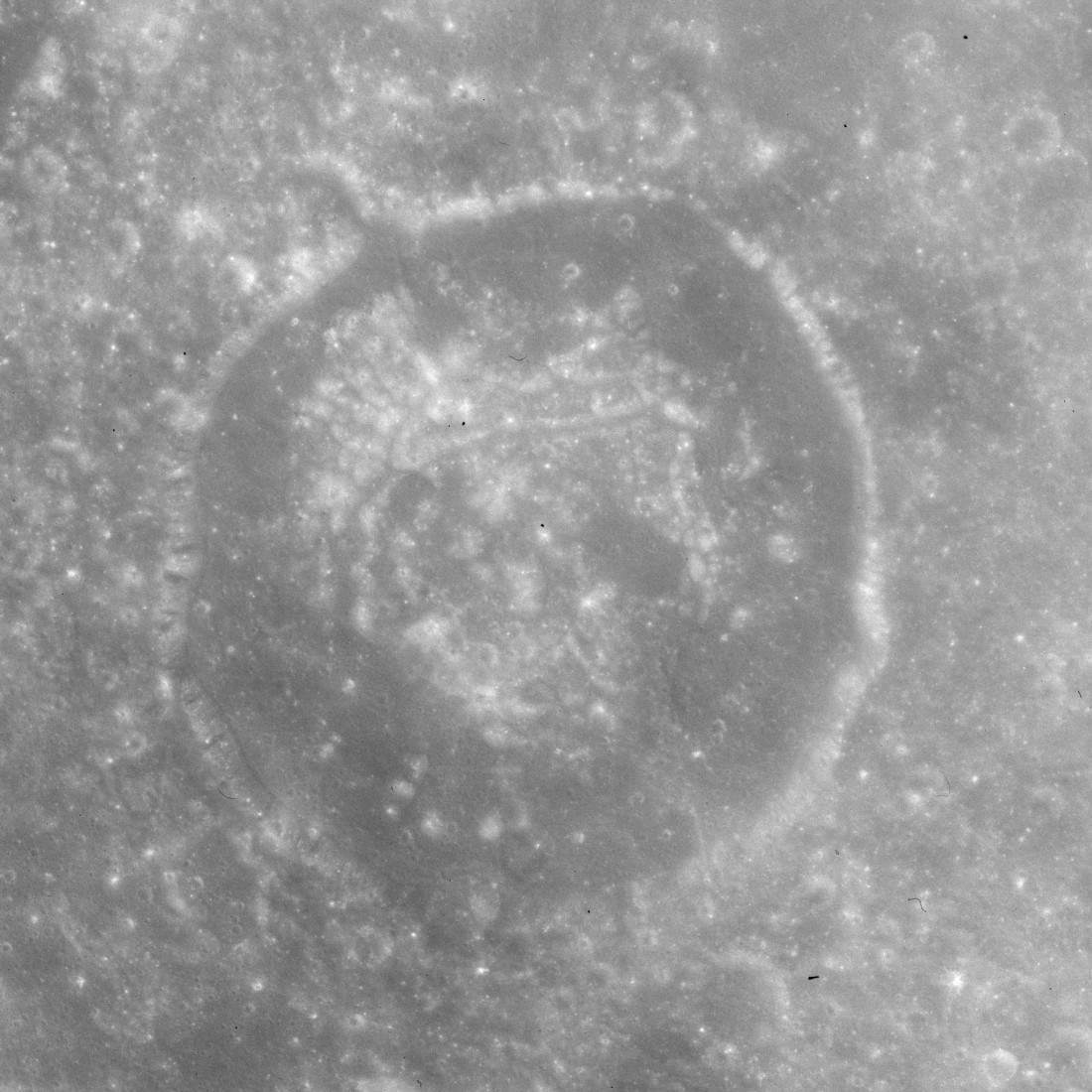
- Apollo 15 mapping camera image
- Coordinates: 3.98°S 87.35°E
- Diameter: 34.51 km
- Depth: 0.51 km
- Colongitude: 274° at sunrise
- Eponym: Worcester R. Warner

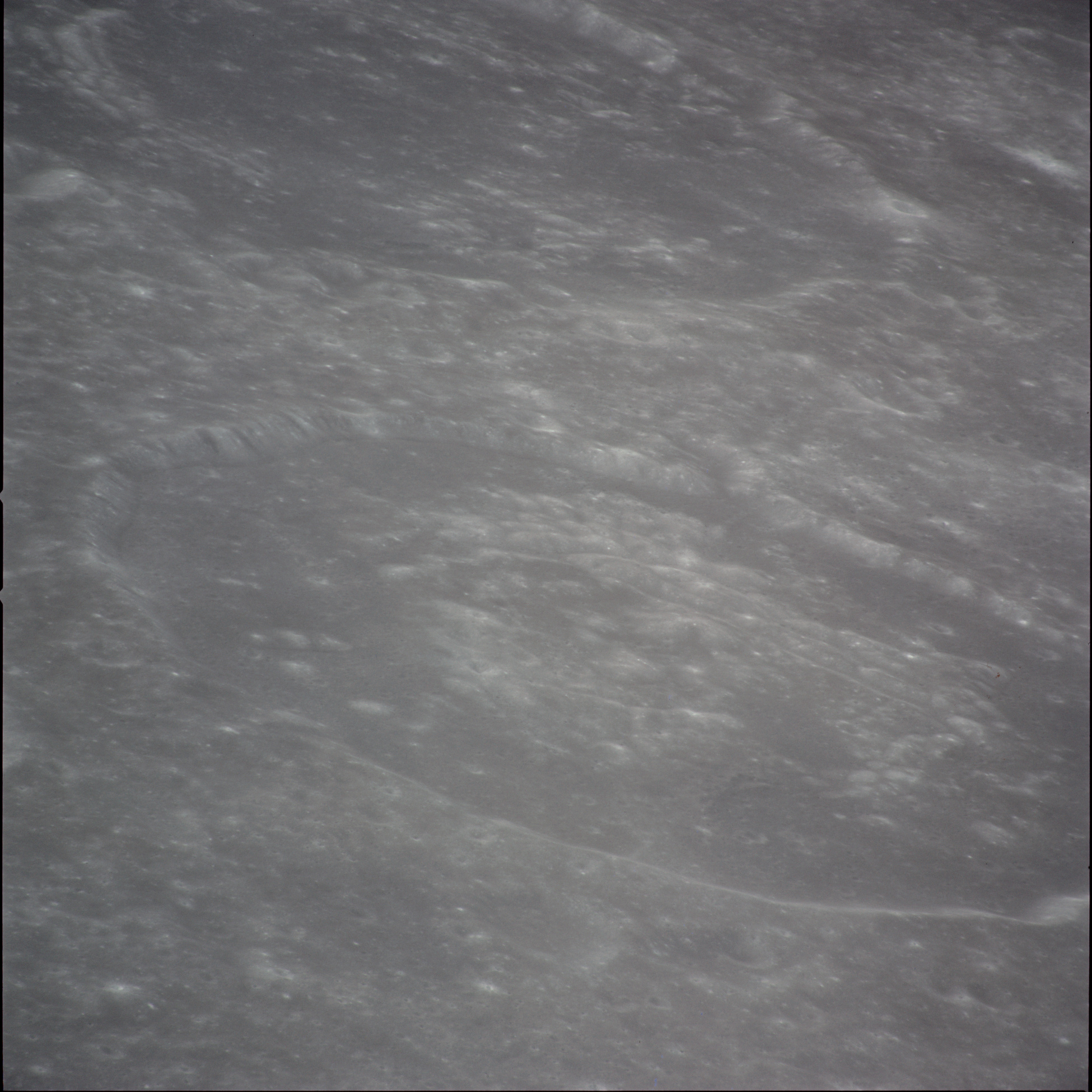
Oblique Apollo 14 image, Warner in foreground and Runge in background

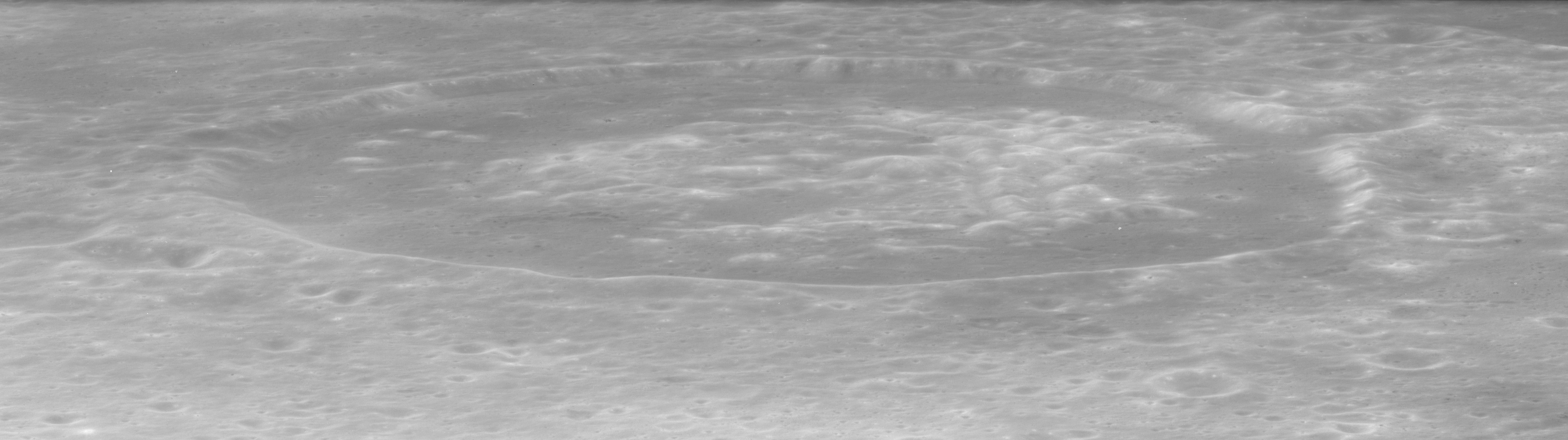
Oblique view from Apollo 17

Warner is a lunar impact crater that is located in the southern part of the Mare Smythii, near the eastern limb of the Moon. In this location the crater is viewed almost from the edge from Earth, and is sometimes hidden from sight due to libration. The crater lies just to the south-southeast of the very similar Runge. To the southwest is Widmannstätten, and to the south is the merged Kao–Helmert crater pair.

This crater has been almost completely submerged by lava flows, leaving only a shallow outer rim projecting up through the surface. The surviving rim is nearly circular, and has low sections along the northern and southern faces. The interior floor is similar in appearance to the surrounding lunar mare, and is marked only by a few tiny craterlets. There is a small, shallow crater just to the southwest of the outer rim.

The depth of the crater is about 510 meters, from the lowest parts of the crater floor to the highest portion of the northwestern rim.

The crater in named after Worcester Reed Warner; the name was approved by the IAU in 1976.
