= Swasey (crater) =

Lunar crater

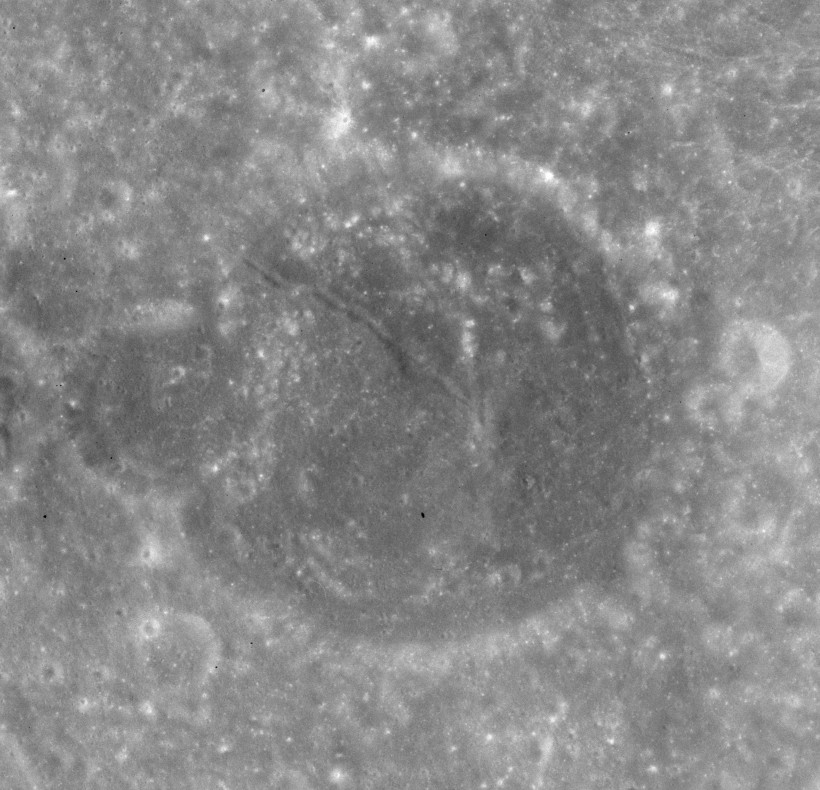
- Apollo 15 mapping camera image
- Coordinates: 5.46°S 89.67°E
- Diameter: 24.85 km
- Depth: 0.79 km
- Colongitude: 271° at sunrise
- Eponym: Ambrose Swasey

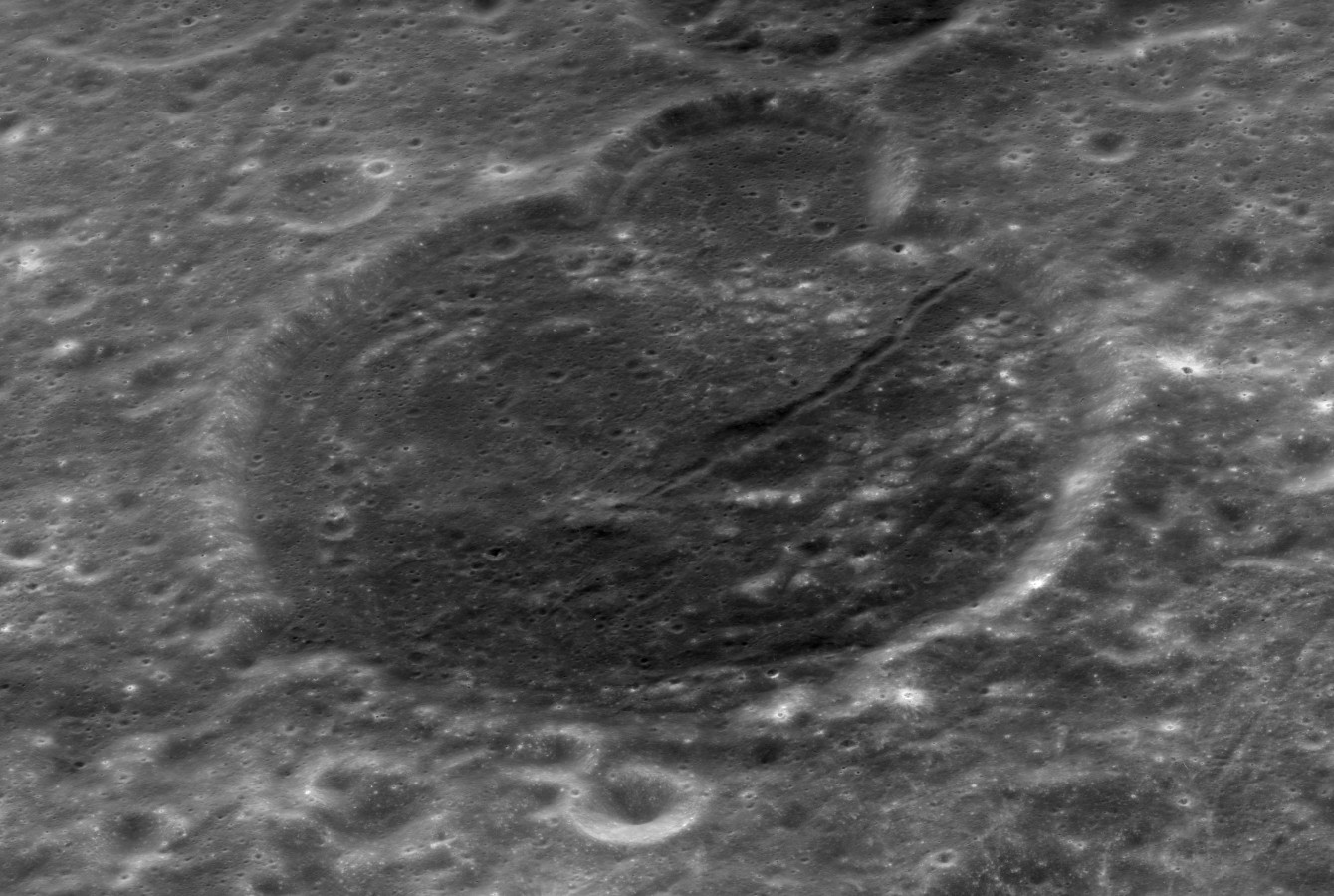
Oblique view from Apollo 17

Swasey is a small lunar impact crater that lies along the eastern limb of the Moon. It lies near the southeastern edge of the Mare Smythii, to the west of the walled plain Hirayama. About one crater diameter to the northeast is Hume, and to the southwest is the merged crater pair of Kao and Helmert.

The outer rim of this crater is roughly circular, and a small crater overlies the northwestern side. This attached crater is also joined to the southeastern outer rim of the small crater Lebesgue.

The crater's name was approved by the IAU in 1976.
