= Haldane (lunar crater) =

Crater on the Moon

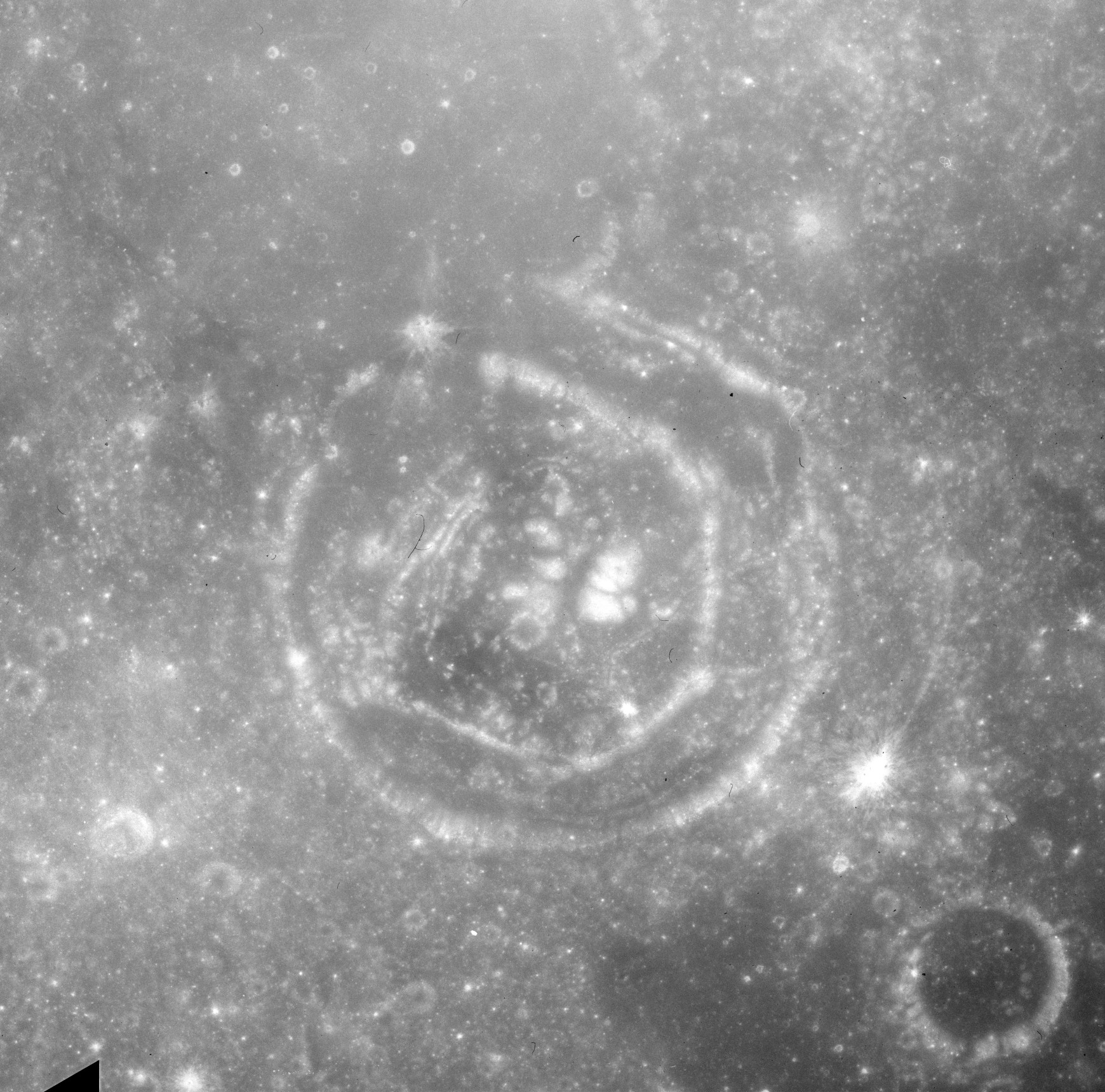
- Apollo 16 Mapping Camera image
- Coordinates: 1.66°S 84.11°E
- Diameter: 40.26 km
- Depth: 0.9 km
- Colongitude: 277° at sunrise
- Eponym: J. B. S. Haldane

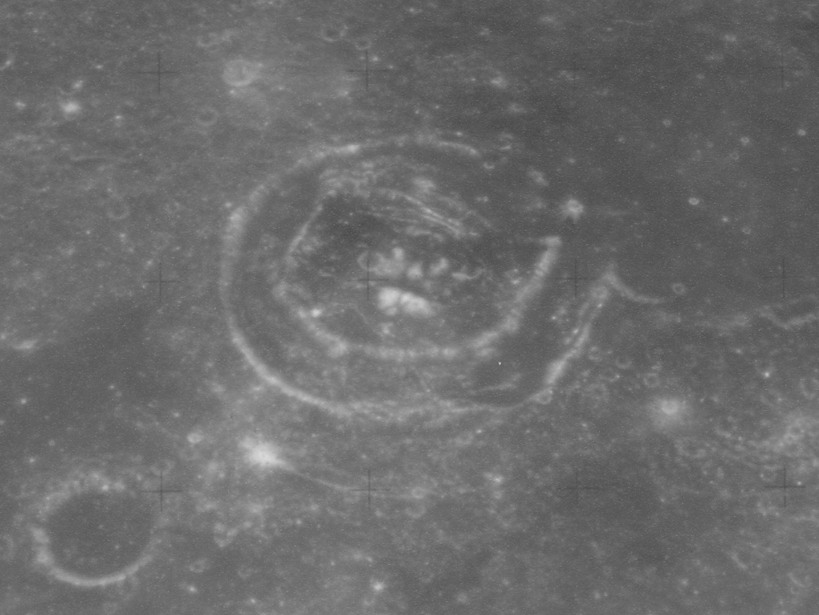
Oblique view of Haldane from Apollo 16

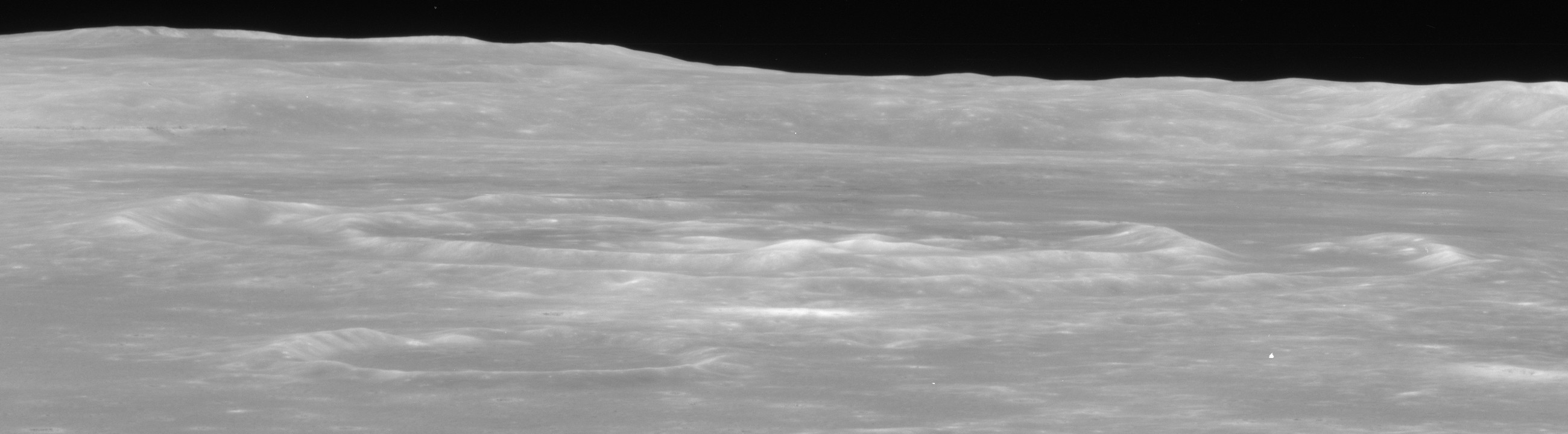
Highly oblique view from Apollo 17

Haldane is a lunar impact crater that is located in Mare Smythii, near the eastern limb of the Moon. The visibility of this formation is affected by libration, and even under favorable conditions it is highly foreshortened. It lies just to the west-northwest of the crater Runge, and to the east of Carrillo. The small crater Talbot is immediately to the southwest of Haldane.

Haldane is a somewhat extreme example of many floor-fractured craters in Mare Smythii. The interior of this floor has been flooded by lava, leaving only a low rim projecting up through the lunar mare. This rim is broken along the northwest face, leaving a gap into the interior. In the eastern half of the inner floor is a semi-circular feature that is concentric with the outer wall, forming a wide moat. There is also a low central ridge offset to the east of the interior midpoint. The infrared spectrum of pure crystalline plagioclase has been identified on this peak.

The depth of Haldane is approximately 900 m from the lowest point on the floor of its northwestern quadrant to the highest point on the southwestern part of its outer rim.

The crater's name was approved by the IAU in 1973.
