= Cold spot (astronomy) =

Cold regions surrounding impact craters

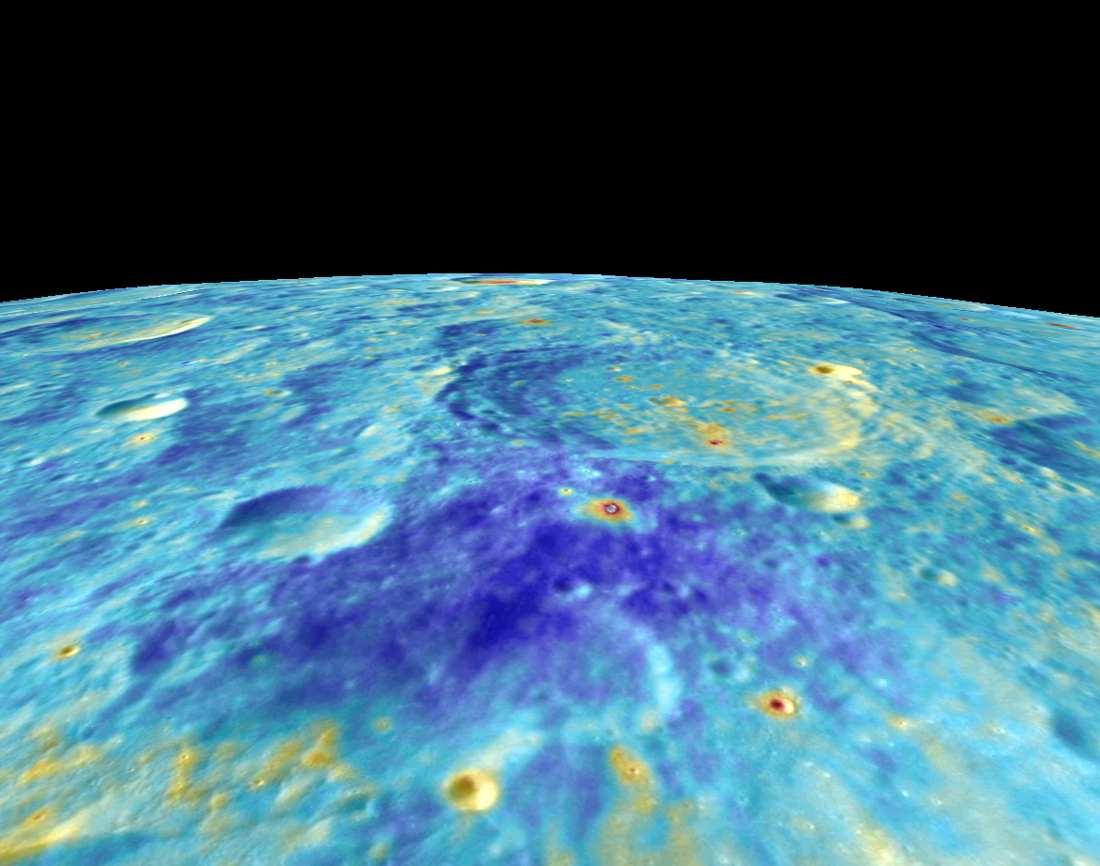
Cold spot (blue) surrounded by older, larger impact craters

A cold spot is a region of anomalously low nighttime surface temperature surrounding a young impact crater on an airless planetary surface. Material is displaced and rarefied by hypervelocity impacts, and ejecta fall to form a "fluffy" surface layer that is less densely packed than surrounding regolith. The resulting region of low surface density has a lower thermal inertia than other material and cools faster after sunset. Cold spots have been found only on the Moon but are predicted to be present on Mercury and other airless bodies.

On the Moon's surface, these ray-like spots extend 10 to 100 times the radius of the impact crater and are 2–10 °C (4–18 °F) cooler than the surrounding lunar surface. Depending on size, cold spots fade to background levels after roughly 0.5–1 million years (Note: Comparison of cold spot crater size and frequency distributions with established crater chronology models originally constrained their retention time to no more than 0.5 to 1 million years, with smaller cold spots possibly fading within a few hundred thousand years. However, Powell et al. (2025) identified a faint cold spot surrounding South Ray crater at the Apollo 16 landing site with a modelled age of 2.08±0.17 Ma, making it the oldest known cold spot and suggesting that larger cold spots may persist for up to two million years or more.) as successive impacts and seismic waves recompact the material. They cover over 1% of the lunar surface.

The phenomenon was first observed by Apollo 17, which carried an infrared radiometer. Cold spots were systematically characterized and mapped by planetary scientist Joshua Bandfield and collaborators in 2011 using data from the Diviner Lunar Radiometer Experiment (DLRE) on NASA's Lunar Reconnaissance Orbiter. Over 2,200 cold spots have been identified on the lunar surface between the latitudes 50° N and 50° S, with source craters ranging from 43 meters (141 ft) to 2.3 kilometers (1.4 mi) in diameter.

== Discovery and early observations ==
The command and service module on Apollo 17 was equipped with an infrared scanning radiometer. During its lunar orbit in December 1972, the instrument detected low-temperature anomalies near certain craters. Observations were reported by planetary scientists Wendell W. Mendell and Frank J. Low in 1974 but attracted little further investigation for several decades.

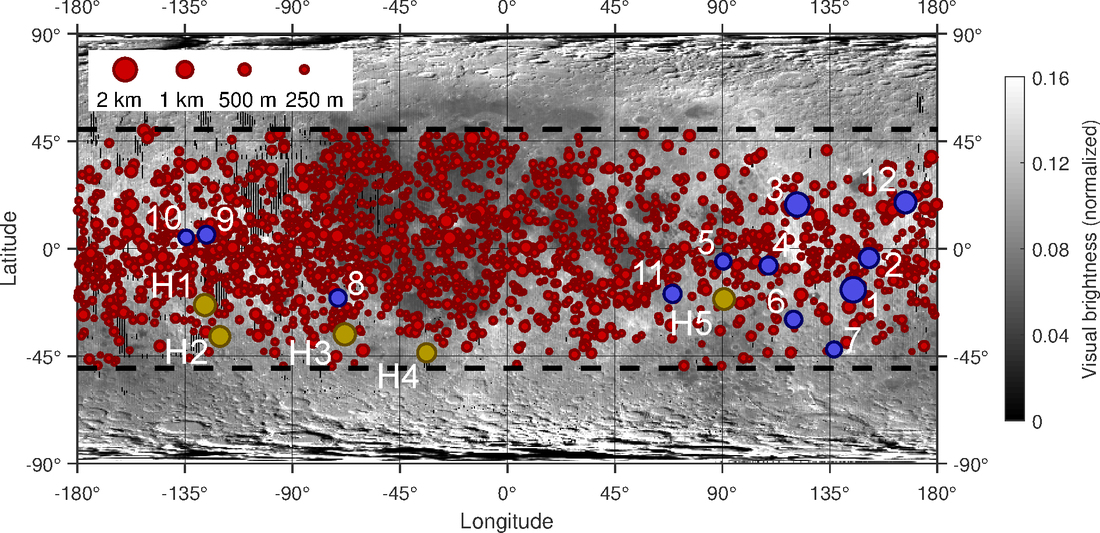
Map of lunar cold spots (blue dots: cold spots with craters 800 meters [2,600 ft] or more in diameter)

With the launch of NASA's Lunar Reconnaissance Orbiter in June 2009, a systematic global mapping campaign was carried out using the Diviner Lunar Radiometer Experiment. The instrument measured emitted thermal radiation and reflected sunlight across the lunar surface and could derive surface kinetic temperatures to a precision of 1–2 K. Using seven spectral channels spanning the visible spectrum and infrared wavelengths, Diviner collected over 500 billion radiometric measurements and mapped surface temperatures across the entire surface of the Moon. The instrument built composite coverage by taking measurements at multiple local times over successive orbits, producing a map with a spatial resolution of 180 by 300 meters (590 ft × 980 ft) per pixel.

Analysis of the dataset by Joshua L. Bandfield and collaborators in 2011 identified cold spots as a formally distinct class of surface feature. Cold spots appear in Diviner nighttime temperature maps as ray-like or irregular patches of suppressed temperature radiating outward from a central young crater. They are absent from daytime maps and visible or near-infrared reflectance data, with no distinguishing albedo, spectral, or geomorphology signature. Detection is dependent on night-time thermal infrared mapping. Over 2,200 spots were characterized in greater detail by 2014.

== Properties ==
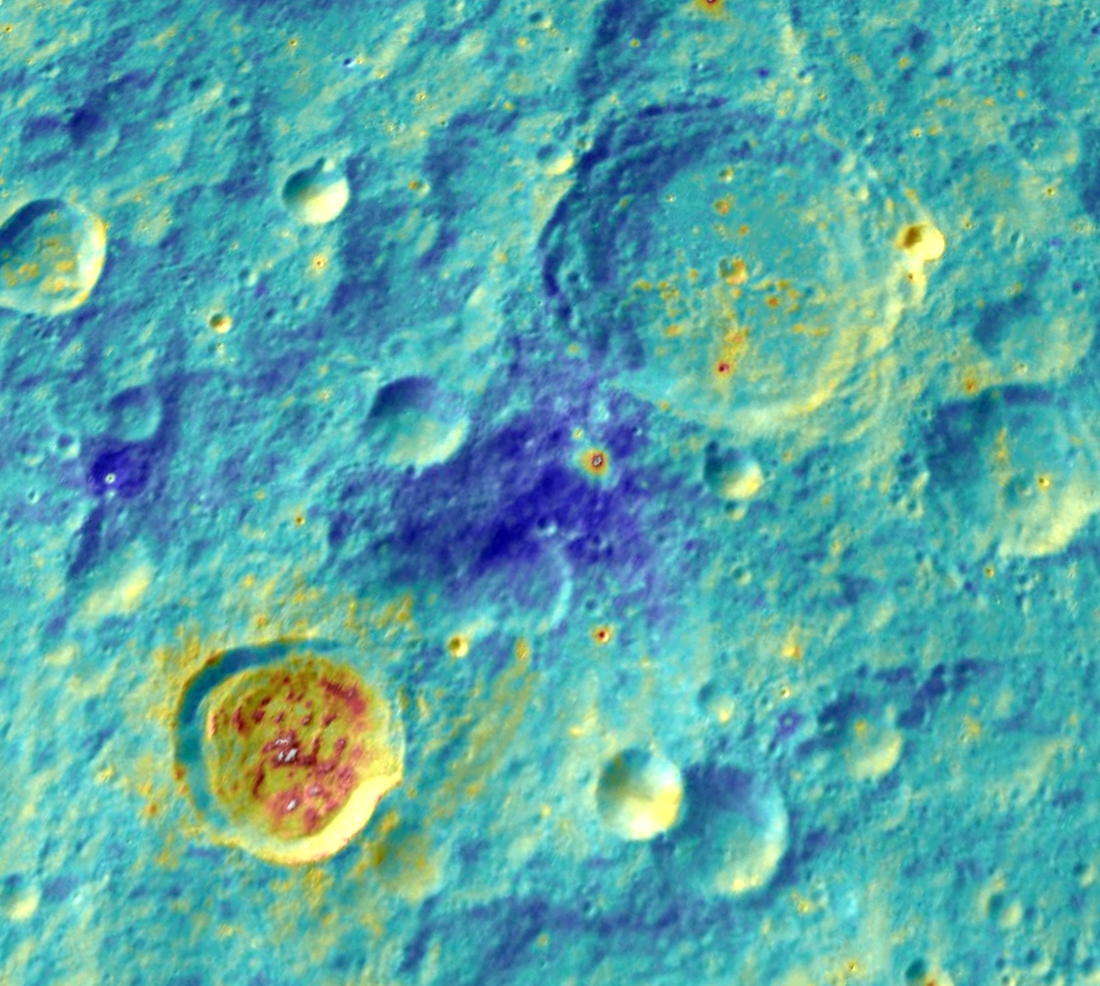
Einthoven cold spot (blue) located between much warmer craters on the Lunar far side

Cold spots possess thermal inertia values of 40–50 J m^{−2} K^{−1} s^{−1/2} at kilometer scales, 10 to 30 percent lower than the global average for lunar regolith fines. In the largest cold spots, values can fall below 20 J m^{−2} K^{−1} s^{−1/2}, among the lowest recorded anywhere on the lunar surface. The largest temperature contrast occurs just after sunset, when the surrounding surface has the greatest amount of trapped heat, and gradually diminishes through the night. The cold-spot layer is estimated to be at least five centimeters (2 in) thick to explain the persistent thermal signature across the entire lunar night. The total volume of decompacted material in a cold spot is typically more than ten times the volume of the source crater itself. This suggests that the impact modifies the surrounding regolith to distances and depths far exceeding what direct ejecta deposition could account for.

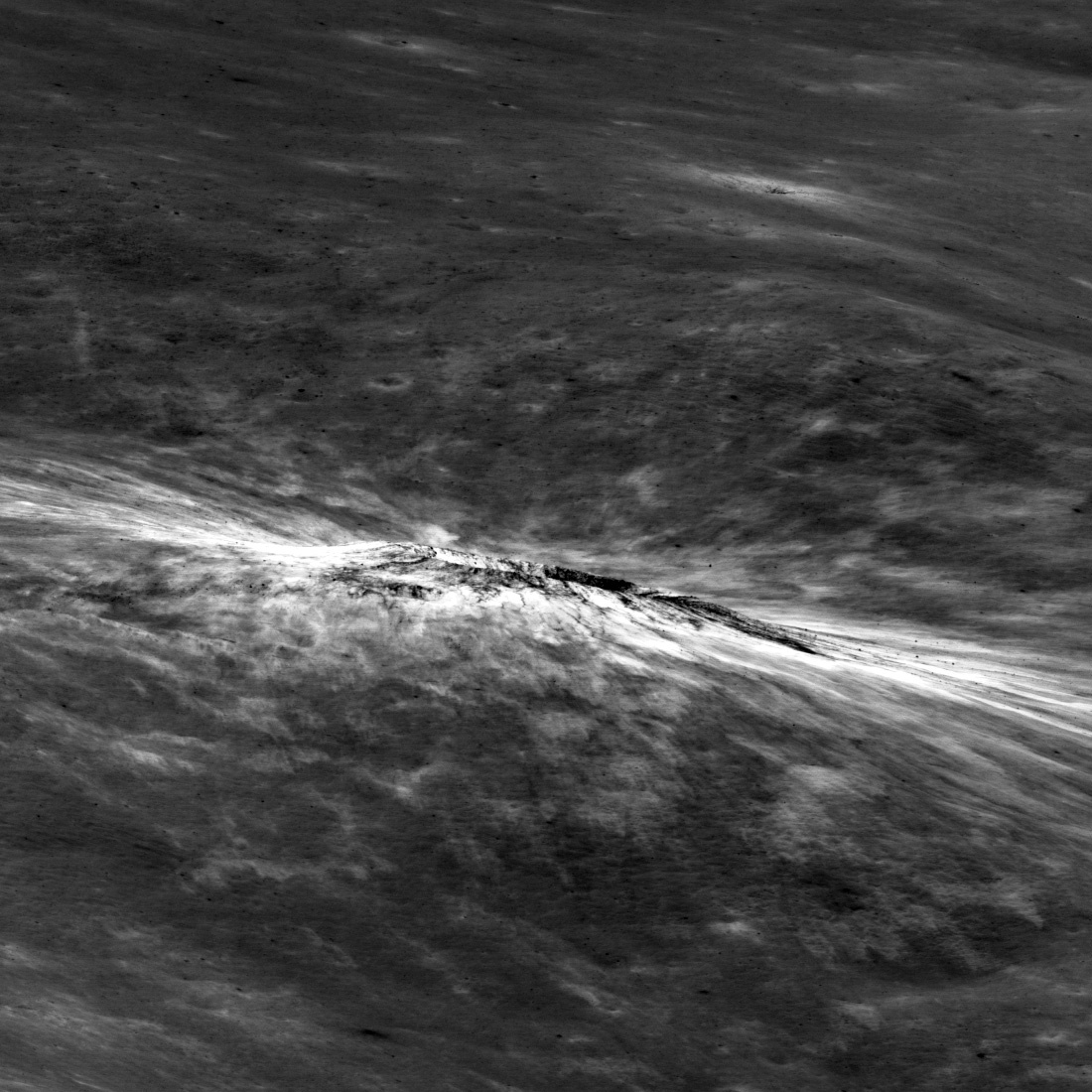
Oblique view of the 1.1 km (0.68 mi) Einthoven cold spot crater

All new craters greater than forty meters (130 ft) in diameter possess cold spots, suggesting that the phenomenon is universal to recent impacts above this size threshold. Larger impacts produce more pronounced cold spots extending across greater distances. For example, the Einthoven cold spot, an informal name for the 1.1-kilometer (0.68 mi) impact crater located on the far side of the Moon south of the older and much larger Einthoven crater, is one of the largest ever catalogued, covering approximately 2,070 km^{2} (800 sq mi) of terrain and extends up to fifty kilometers (31 mi) from the crater.

Cold spots are not uniformly distributed, with double the density near the Moon's apex (0° N, 90° W), the leading side in its orbital motion with a higher degree of impact cratering. The largest cold spots, with source crater diameters a kilometer (0.62 mi) or wider, are concentrated on the antapex in the trailing hemisphere.

Analysis of Apollo 16 astronaut footprint depths revealed that they were slightly deeper in the cold spot surrounding South Ray crater, providing physical evidence for lower density regolith around cold spots. This agrees with thermal modelling, which requires a lower average density to explain the reduced nighttime temperatures.

== Formation mechanism ==
The mechanism by which an impact creates cold spots at large distances remains an active area of research. Since ejecta deposition alone cannot account for the amount of low-density material or its vast distance from the crater, three main hypotheses have been proposed for how impacts decompactify surrounding regolith:

- Granular flow and secondary impacts: A laterally propagating granular flow driven by the impact under vacuum redistributes surface material close to the crater. Further out, a cascade of secondary ballistic impacts from the primary crater could progressively churn and loosen the regolith across the wider cold spot area. Eclipse and twilight thermal data are consistent with small surface rocks deposited by this granular flow process.
- Expanding vapor cloud: A rapidly expanding cloud of material vaporized by impact travels outward across the surface, entraining and disaggregating regolith grains without net deposition. Thermophysical modelling of Diviner data found this grain-lifting and turbulent mixing model to be the best match to the observed temperature patterns.
- Seismic wave transmission: Impact energy propagates outward through meter-scale boulders in the megaregolith immediately below the fine regolith layer, driving a surface solitary wave that dilates the overlying soil across large distances. Impact-generated seismic waves passing through the regolith have also been proposed as a contributing mechanism.

== Lifespan ==
Cold spots are transient features. Comparison of cold-spot crater size and frequency distributions with established crater chronology models constrains their retention time to no more than 0.5 to 1 million years. Smaller cold spots may fade within a few hundred thousand years. Larger cold spots appear to persist longer: crater counts on the largest cold-spot craters (source craters over 800 meters [2,600 ft] in diameter) give model ages of up to about 1.1 million years, well beyond the roughly 100,000- to 200,000-year isochron that fits the overall population. A 2025 study of the cold spot at South Ray crater – with a modeled age of 2.08±0.17 million years, the oldest yet identified – found its age, and the strength of its temperature anomaly, consistent with the fading rate expected for a cold spot of its size.

Cold spots decay as meteorite and micrometeorite bombardment recompacts and homogenizes the decompacted regolith layer. The present-day flux of these primary impactors alone is far too low to account for the observed fading rate, with models suggesting it would overturn only a couple of millimeters of regolith in five million years. Secondary impacts, debris thrown out by other impacts elsewhere on the Moon, are instead thought to be the dominant driver. An updated version of a longstanding lunar regolith-mixing model predicts a roughly 99% chance of the upper regolith being overturned to a depth of about 12 centimeters (4.7 in) at least once, and to a depth of five centimeters (2.0 in) 100 or more times, within 300,000 years, broadly matching the observed cold spot lifetimes. This process may not be spatially uniform. A higher flux of small secondary impactors on the Moon's leading hemisphere is proposed to erase large cold spots there faster than on the trailing hemisphere.

== Significance ==
Because cold spots are associated exclusively with the youngest impact craters, they provide a practical tool for identifying craters formed within the last million years, which in turn constrains models for impact flux rate on the Moon.

Cold spots also reveal the rate and depth at which the lunar surface is continuously turned over and mixed by meteorite bombardment. Their rapid degradation implies that the uppermost regolith is actively processed on geologically short timescales. Moreover, the modelled formation ages of the largest cold-spot craters coincide with the 0–1.4-million-year cosmic ray exposure ages of known lunar meteorites on Earth, making cold-spot craters strong candidates for their source sites.

== Possible occurrence on other bodies ==
Cold spots have only been found on the Moon. However, the regolith decompaction process that generates lunar cold spots is expected to occur on any airless, silicate-rich body with a fine-grained surface layer. Thermal modelling predicts that cold spots at least 6 K cooler than ambient should exist on Mercury. In 2018, BepiColombo was launched by the European Space Agency and JAXA carrying a thermal radiometer that will search for cold spots on Mercury.
