= Diviner (radiometer) =

Radiometer used in NASA's Lunar Reconnaissance Orbiter mission

Diviner, also referred to as the Diviner Lunar Radiometer Experiment (DLRE), is an infrared radiometer aboard NASA's Lunar Reconnaissance Orbiter, part of the Lunar Precursor Robotic Program which is studying the Moon. It has been used to create temperature maps of the Moon's surface, as well as detect ice deposits and surface composition.

The instrument has measured temperatures of −247 °C (−412.6 °F) in a crater at the northern pole and −238 °C (−396.4 °F) in craters at the southern pole. On 9 October 2009, the Diviner team announced the detection of a hot spot on the Moon at the location of the LCROSS spacecraft impact site.
