= Mare Smythii =

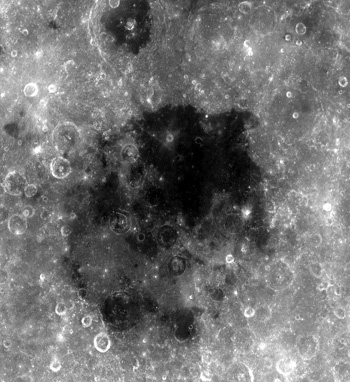
- Mare Smythii
- Coordinates: 1.3°N 87.5°E
- Diameter: 373 km (232 mi)
- Eponym: Sea of William Henry Smyth

Mare Smythii /ˈsmɪθiaɪ/ (Latin for "Smyth's Sea") is a lunar mare located along the equator on the easternmost edge of the Moon's near side, named for the 19th-century British astronomer William Henry Smyth. It is one of only two lunar maria that are named after people, the other being Mare Humboldtianum (named after German explorer Alexander von Humboldt).

The Smythii basin where the mare is located is of the Pre-Nectarian epoch, while the surrounding features are of the Nectarian system. It is contained within a minimal diameter of 373.97 km, and has been excavated to a depth of 4 km. The mare material, which makes up the floor of the mare, is a low alumina basalt, and consists of Upper Imbrian basalt covered by Eratosthenian basalt. Features observed within the basin include wrinkle ridges, submerged "ghost" craters, domes, crater chains, and rilles.

The overall shape of the mare is circular, likely the result of a large impact. Further bombardment followed, creating the irregular shape. Subsequent volcanism laid down the mare material. As a result of this sequence, only the northeastern portion and a smaller area in the western central contain significant regions of smooth mare material. The remaining surface is more hummocky with a higher albedo. The geological features suggest that lava flowed from the southeast and west toward the northeast, where it accumulated in the lowest parts of the basin. Mare Smythii contains a relatively high number of craters with fractured floors, including the noticeably unusual crater Haldane. This is probably a result of uplift from injection of magma below the mare.

The prominent lunar cold spot named Bandfield is to the southwest. The crater Neper is located to the north of the mare. This crater makes up part of the southern rim of Mare Marginis. Just off to the northwest of the mare are the craters Schubert and Schubert B. The dark mare-filled crater at the southern edge of Smythii is the crater Kästner.

== Gallery ==
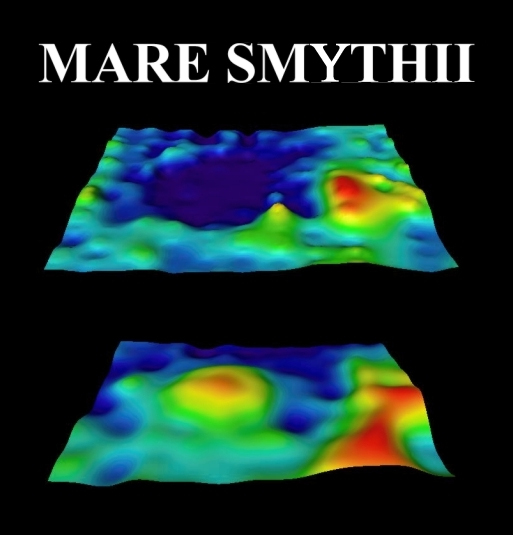
The topography (top) and corresponding gravity (bottom) signal of Mare Smythii reveals a mascon in its center

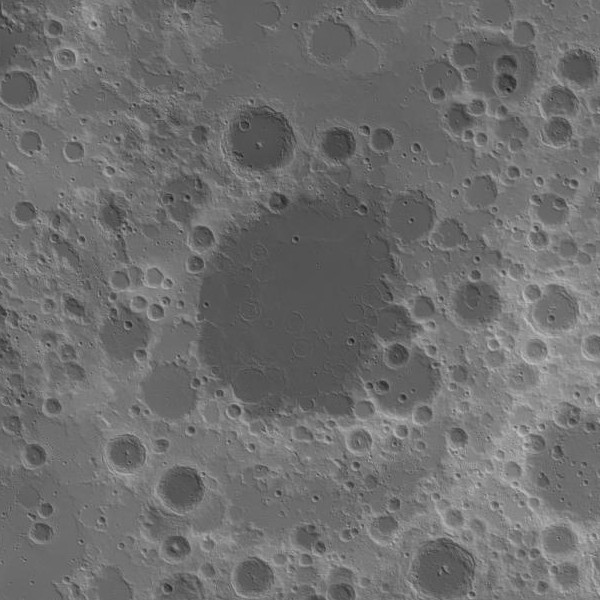
Topographic map

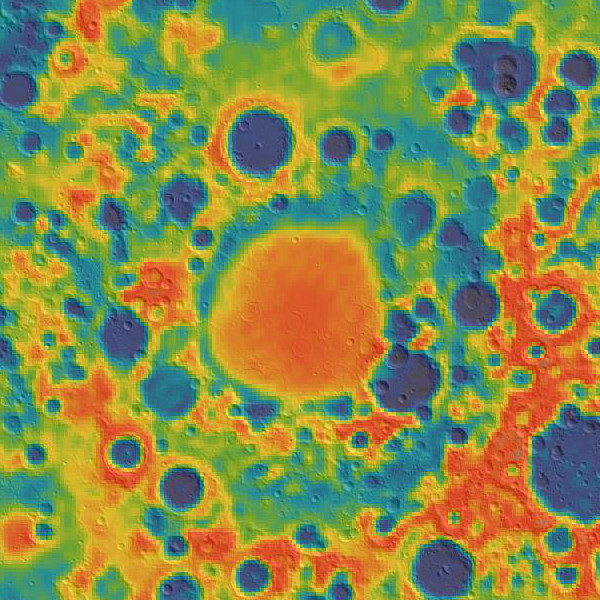
Gravity map based on GRAIL

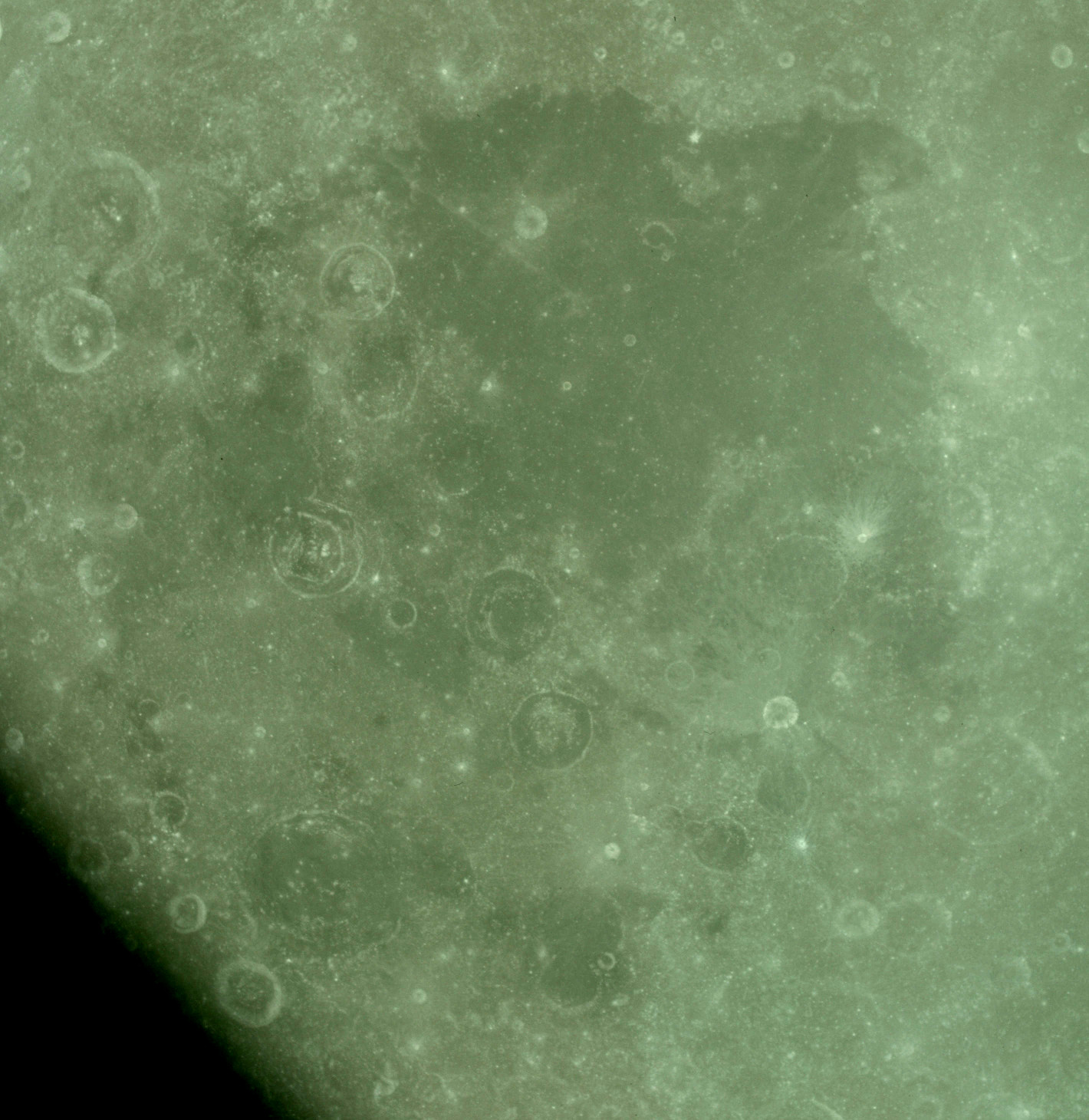
View from Apollo 10

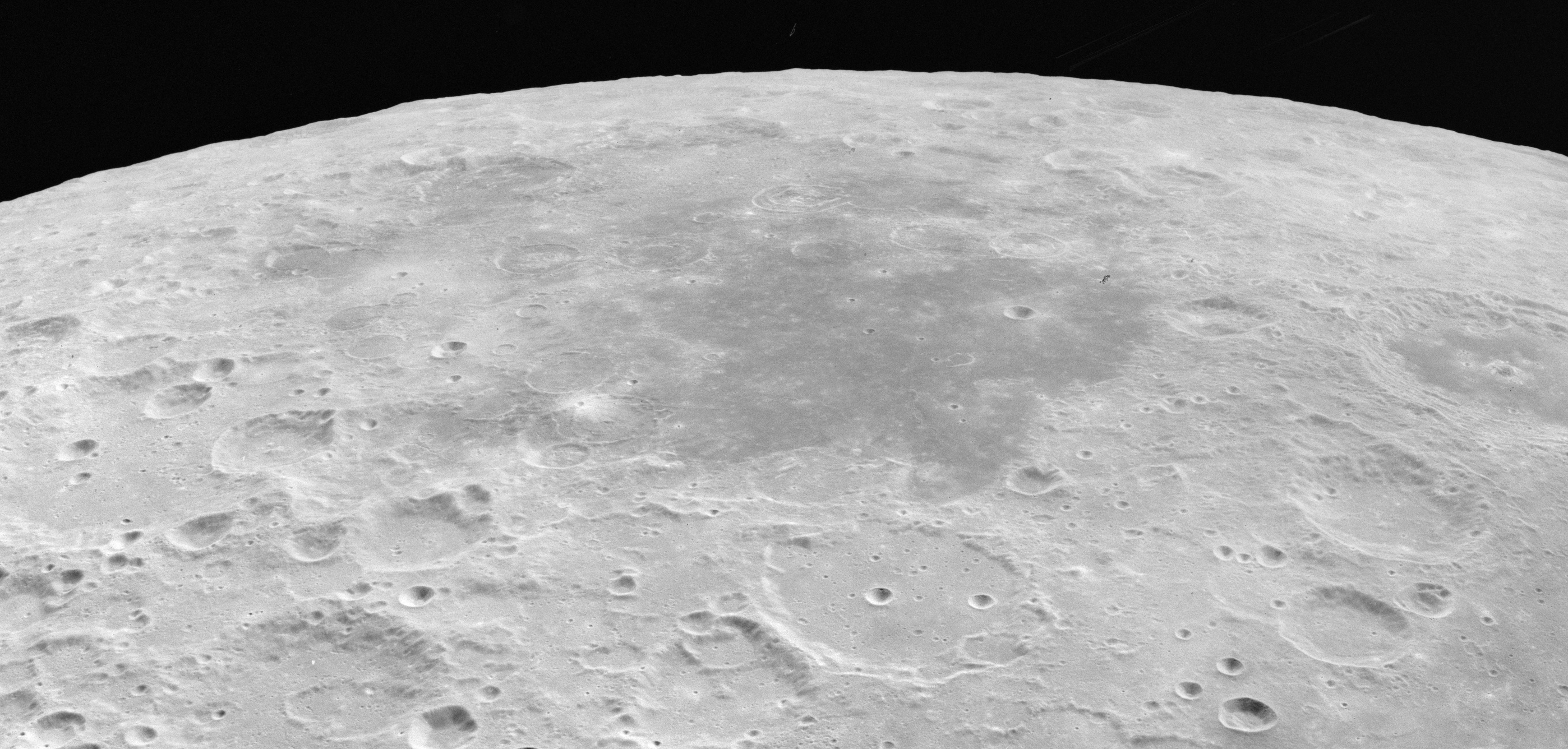
Oblique view from Apollo 16
