= Schliemann (crater) =

Crater on the Moon

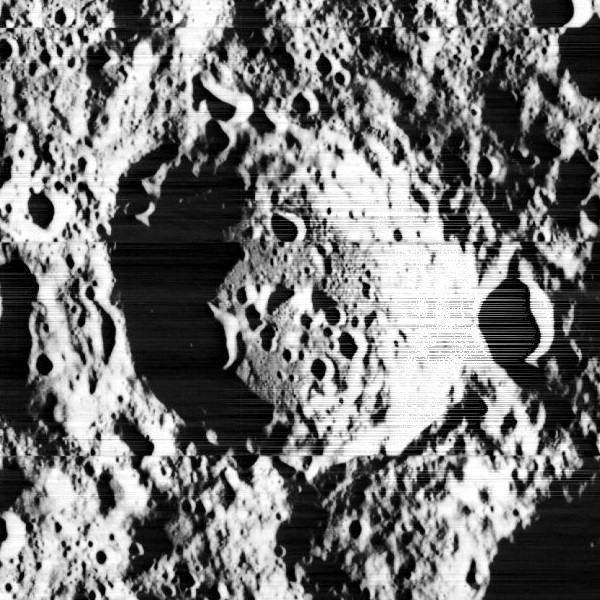
- Lunar Orbiter 1 image
- Coordinates: 2.1°S 155.2°E
- Diameter: 80 km
- Depth: Unknown
- Colongitude: 206° at sunrise
- Eponym: Heinrich Schliemann

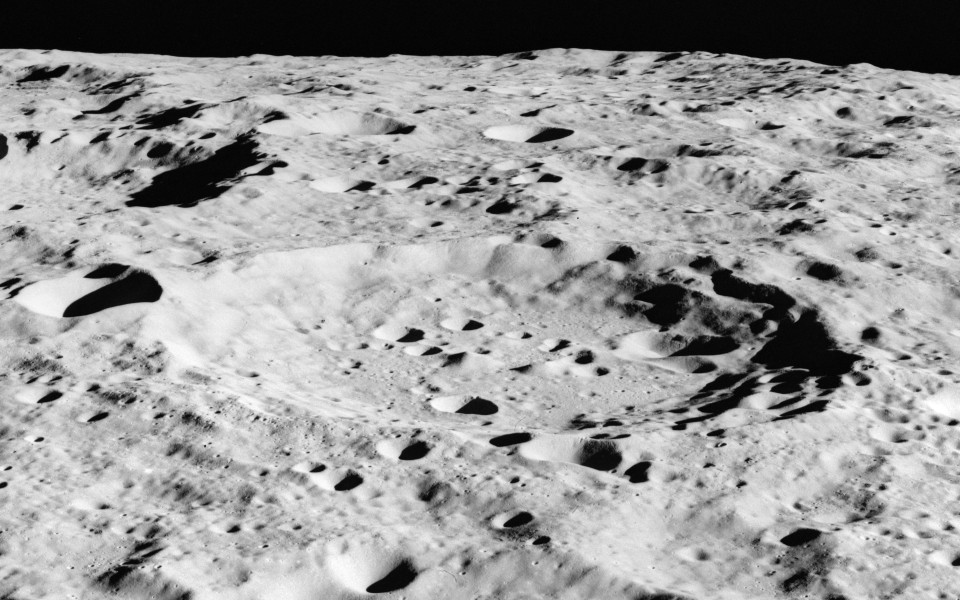
Oblique photo from Apollo 16, facing south

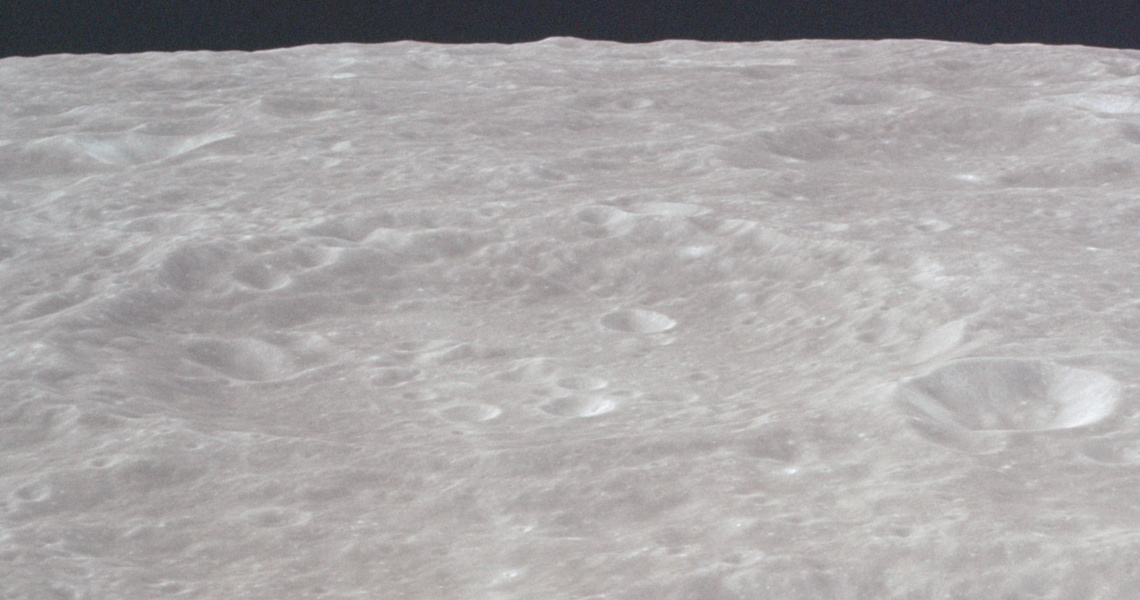
Oblique photo from Apollo 17, facing north

Schliemann is a lunar impact crater on the far side of the Moon. It is located just to the northwest of the somewhat larger crater Ventris, and to the northeast of the prominent Chaplygin. Farther to the northeast of Schliemann is the large Mandelʹshtam.

This crater has undergone a moderate amount of impact erosion, although no significant craters lie across the rim. The interior floor is marked by several small craterlets that form an arcing group in the southern half of the crater. There is also a small craterlet near the northern inner wall.

== Satellite craters ==
By convention these features are identified on lunar maps by placing the letter on the side of the crater midpoint that is closest to Schliemann.

Schliemann	Latitude	Longitude	Diameter
A	1.2° N	155.4° E	64 km
B	2.1° N	156.2° E	32 km
G	2.4° S	156.8° E	19 km
T	2.0° S	152.8° E	21 km
W	0.2° N	152.4° E	19 km
