= Ventris =

Ventris may refer to:

- Ventris (crater), a lunar crater on the far side of the Moon
- Ventris Gibson (born 1956), American government official
- William Ventris Field, 1st Baron Field (1813–1907), English judge
- Latin word for abdomen and related structures

People with the surname Ventris:

- Christopher Ventris (21st century), British tenor
- Francis Ventris (1857–1929), Commander of British Forces in China
- Michael Ventris (1922–1956), English architect and classical scholar
- Peyton Ventris (1645–1691), English judge and politician
