= Planté (crater) =

Crater on the Moon

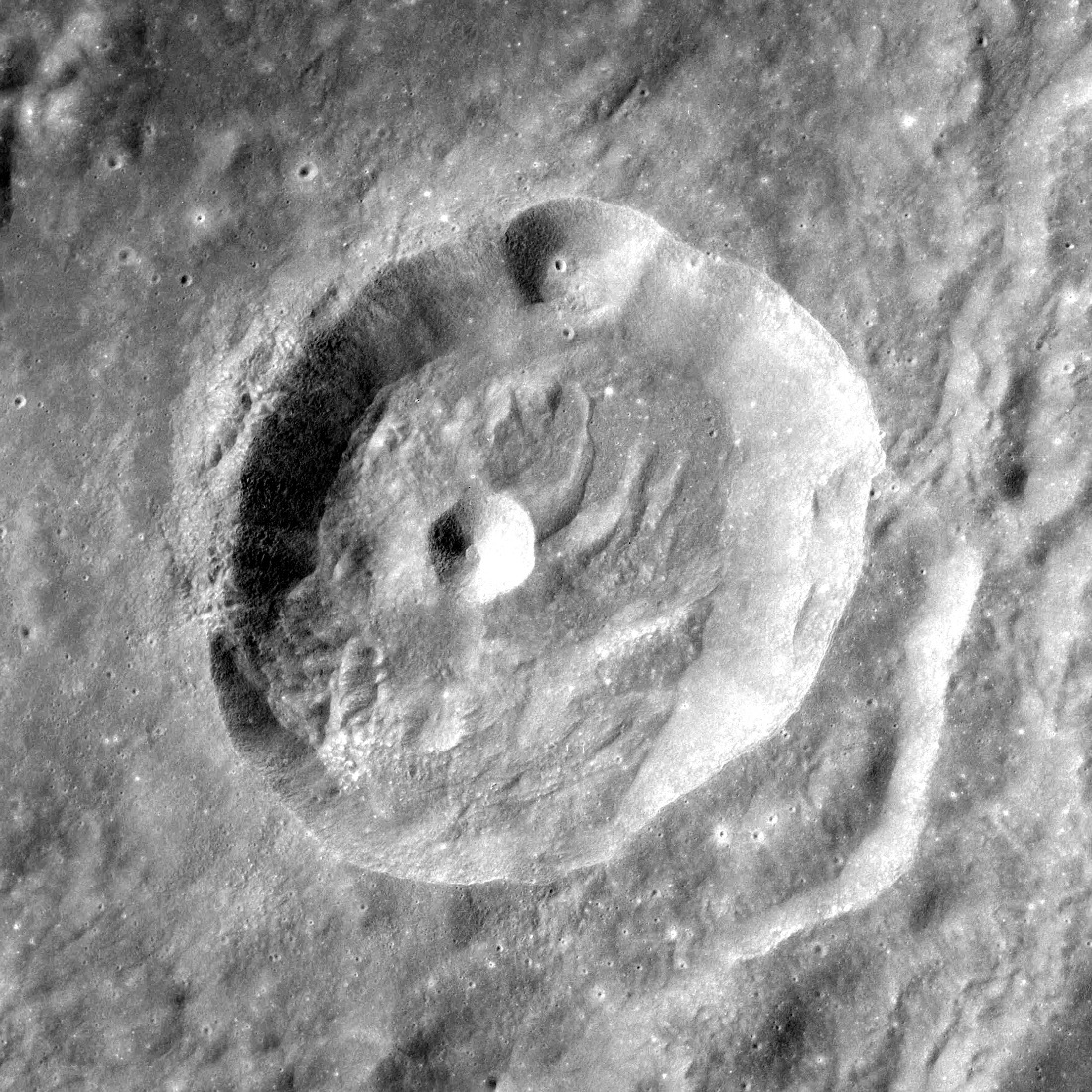
- Apollo 8 image
- Coordinates: 10.2°S 163.3°E
- Diameter: 37 km
- Depth: 3.0 km
- Colongitude: 197° at sunrise
- Eponym: Gaston Planté

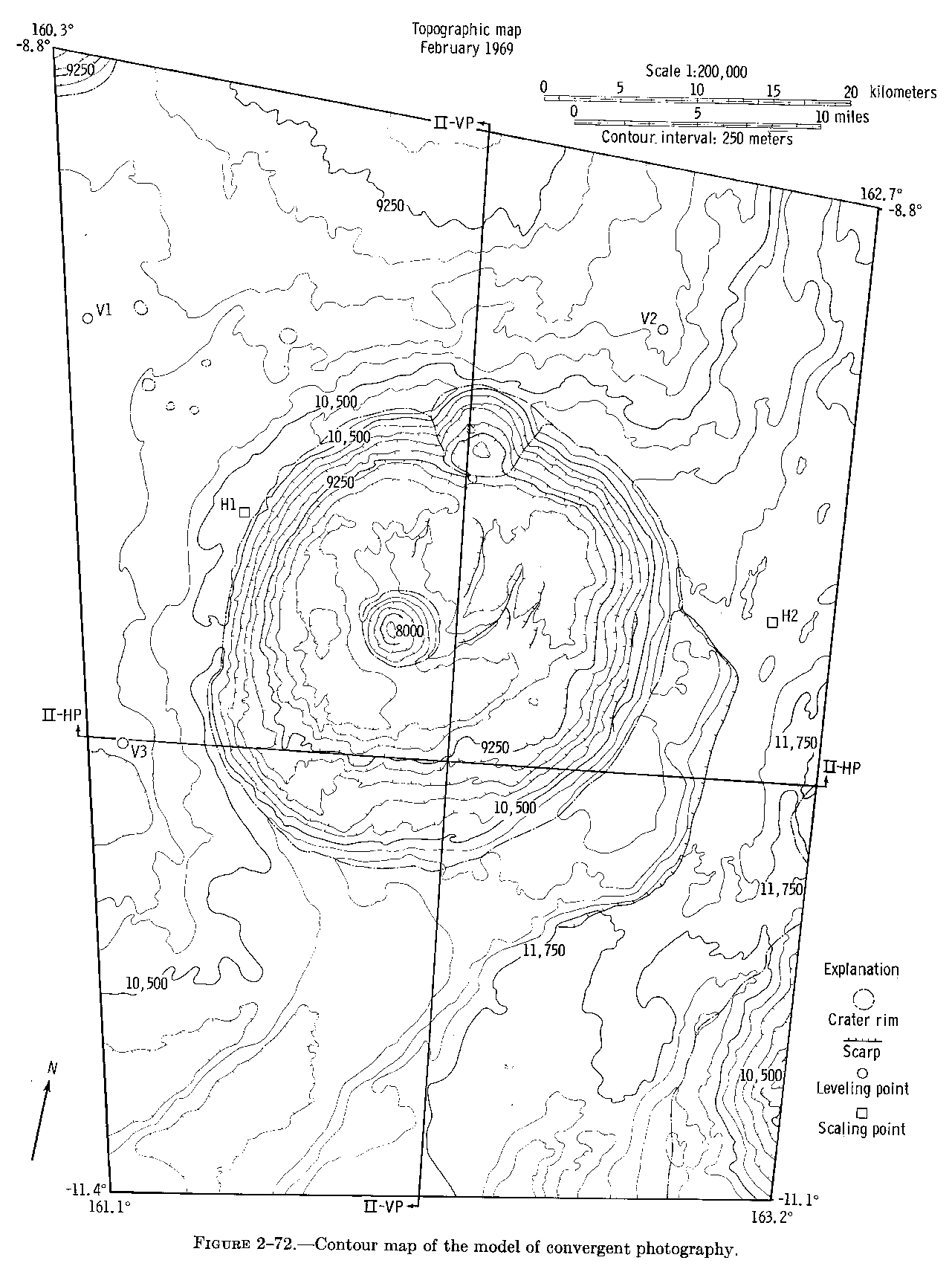
Topographic map of Planté based on Apollo 8 imagery

Planté is a lunar crater that is situated near the eastern inner wall of the much larger crater Keeler. Just to the east, attached to the exterior of Keeler, is the large crater Heaviside. Planté is located on the far side of the Moon and cannot be viewed directly from the Earth.

This crater has a sharp-edged rim and an interior floor that is wider along the southeastern half, possibly due to slumped material or ejecta deposits. The infrared spectrum of pure crystalline plagioclase has been identified on the northwest wall and northern rim. A small crater lies across the northern rim and part of the inner wall. There is no central peak, but a small crater is located just to the west of the midpoint. Low ridges radiate from this crater rim across the floor to the northeast.

A small crater on the northern slope of the interior of Planté was a designated control point, CP-2, during the Apollo 8 mission. Measurements taken from orbit on this point improved the accuracy of mapping of the lunar far side, although they were likely surpassed by subsequent Apollo missions.

The crater is named for Gaston Planté, a French physicist (1834–1889), and the name was approved by the IAU in 1979.
