= Stratton (crater) =

Crater on the Moon

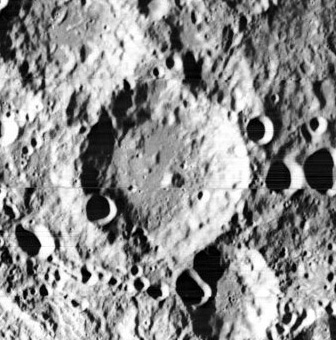
- Lunar Orbiter 2 image
- Coordinates: 5.8°S 164.6°E
- Diameter: 70 km
- Depth: Unknown
- Colongitude: 187° at sunrise
- Eponym: Frederick J. M. Stratton

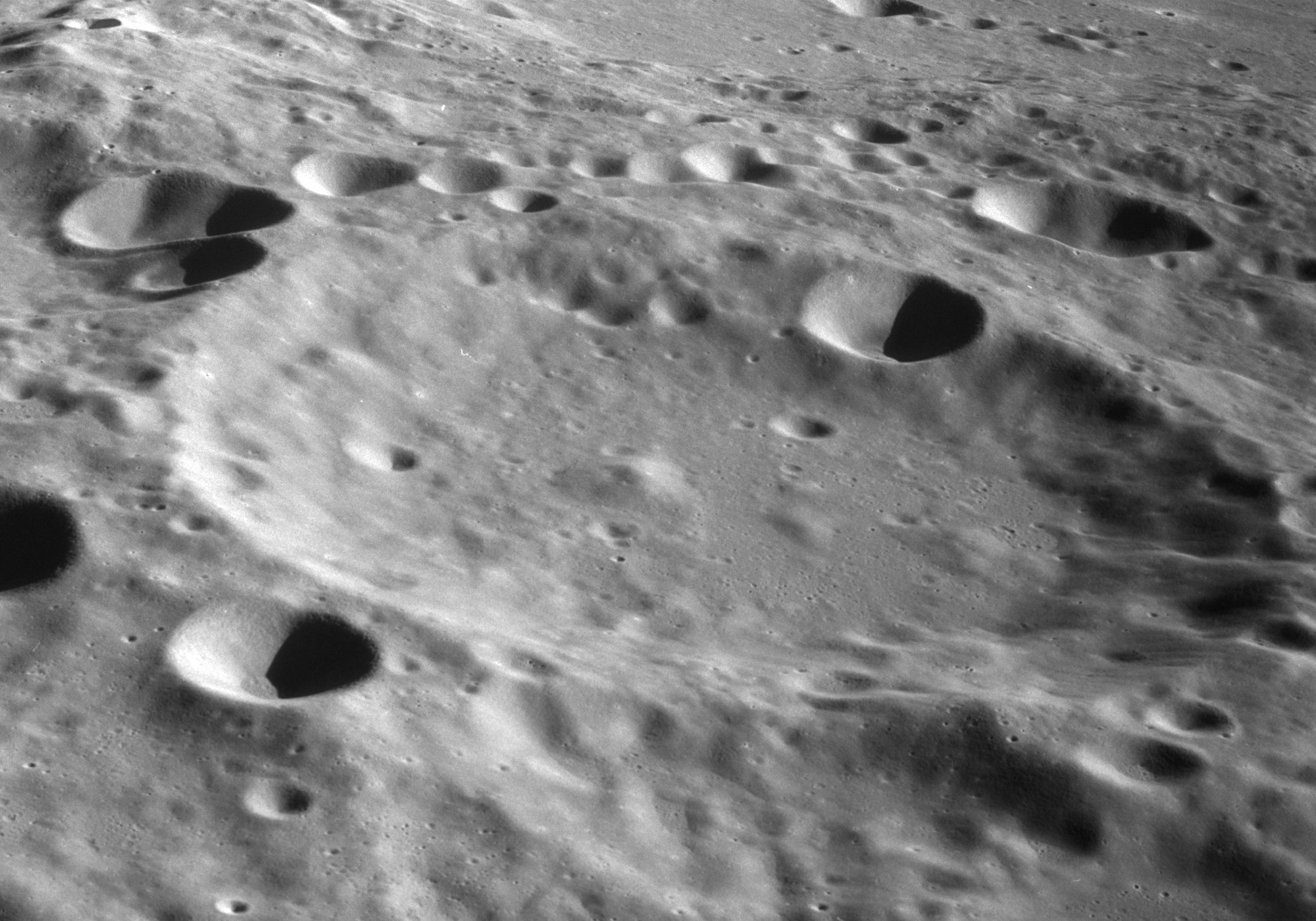
Oblique view from Apollo 11

Stratton is a lunar impact crater on the Moon's far side. It is located to the north of the large craters Keeler and Heaviside, and less than one crater diameter to the south of Dewar.

As with many craters on the Moon, this feature has become worn and eroded due to a multitude of subsequent impacts of various sizes. The most prominent of these is a small, cup-shaped impact along the southwestern outer rim. The remainder of the rim has been worn down, forming an uneven shoulder about the interior depression. The interior floor has a small ridge near the midpoint, but is otherwise unremarkable.

The crater was named after British astronomer and astrophysicist Frederick J. M. Stratton by the IAU in 1970. Stratton was known as Crater 304 prior to naming.

== Satellite craters ==
By convention these features are identified on lunar maps by placing the letter on the side of the crater midpoint that is closest to Stratton.

Stratton	Latitude	Longitude	Diameter
F	5.5° S	166.9° E	22 km
K	7.4° S	165.8° E	41 km
L	7.2° S	165.1° E	13 km
Q	6.3° S	163.8° E	13 km
R	6.7° S	163.0° E	14 km
U	5.3° S	162.5° E	12 km
