= Dewar (crater) =

Crater on the Moon

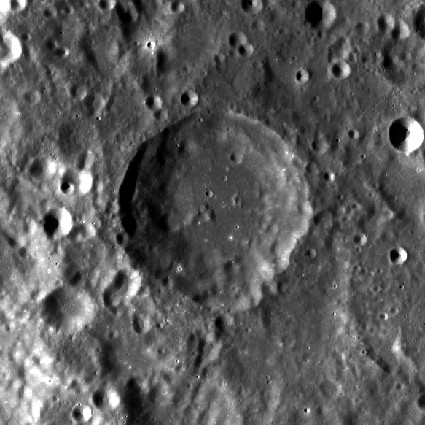
- LRO image
- Coordinates: 2.61°S 165.62°E
- Diameter: 46.31 km (28.78 mi)
- Depth: Unknown
- Colongitude: 195° at sunrise
- Formation: Early Imbrian
- Eponym: James Dewar

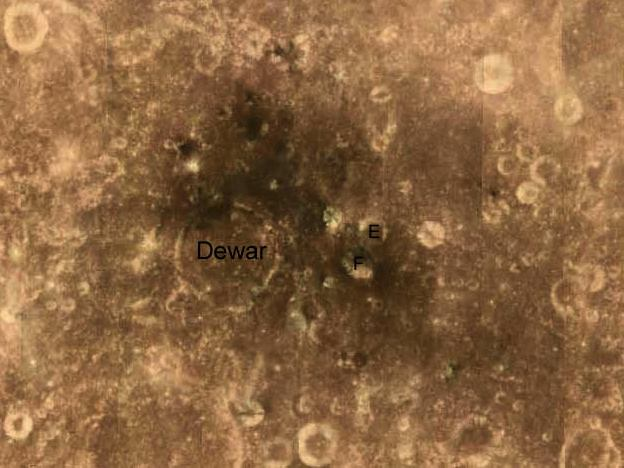
Clementine image showing that Dewar lies within a low-albedo patch on the far side of the Moon.

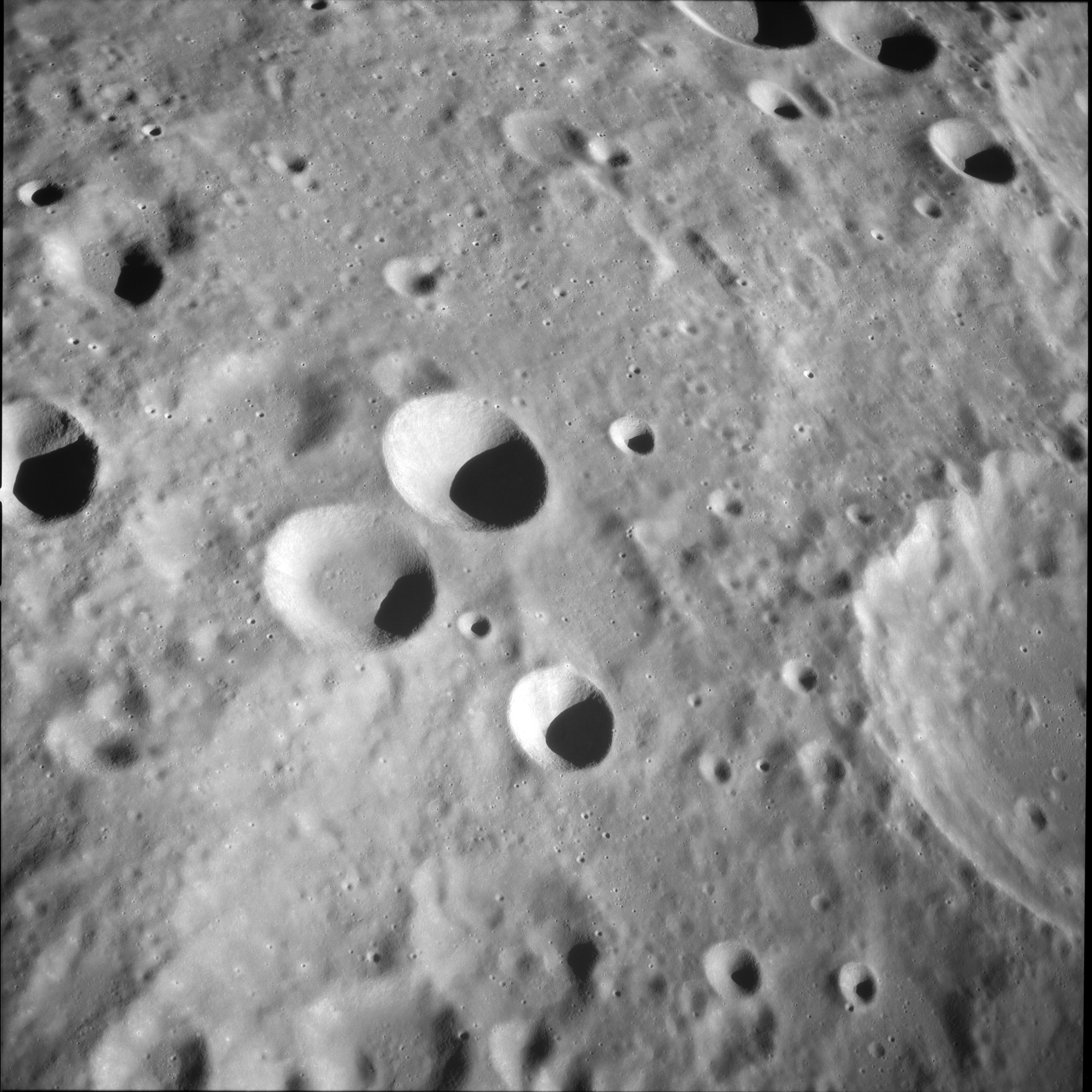
Oblique Apollo 11 image showing the rim of Dewar at right, along with Dewar E and F near center. The scene is within the low-albedo area.

Dewar is a lunar impact crater that lies on the Moon's far side. Less than one crater diameter to the south-southwest is the crater Stratton. Vening Meinesz is a little over one crater diameter to the northwest.

On the lunar geologic timescale, this formation dates to the Early Imbrian period. The slightly worn rim of this crater is roughly circular, with a small outward protrusion along the southern edge. The interior floor is marked by several small impacts along the eastern side.

Dewar lies on the south side of an anomalously low albedo area of terrain (dark patch) on the far side of the Moon. The low-albedo area is also a geochemical anomaly, and is high in iron oxide and titanium dioxide. It has been interpreted as a cryptomare. There is a lunar swirl to the southeast of the crater that is associated with a magnetic anomaly.

This formation was named after British chemist James Dewar (1842-1923). It was officially adopted by the International Astronomical Union in 1970.

== Satellite craters ==
By convention these features are identified on lunar maps by placing the letter on the side of the crater midpoint that is closest to Dewar.

Dewar	Latitude	Longitude	Diameter
E	2.3° S	167.8° E	15 km
F	2.8° S	167.5° E	14 km
S	3.1° S	163.9° E	23 km
