= Vening Meinesz (crater) =

Crater on the Moon

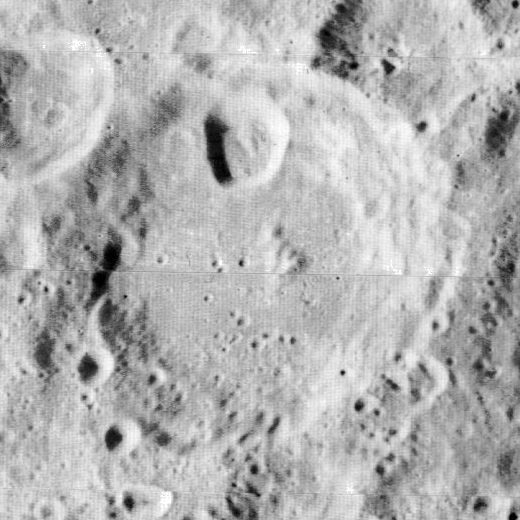
- Lunar Orbiter 2 image
- Coordinates: 0.3°S 162.6°E
- Diameter: 87 km
- Depth: Unknown
- Colongitude: 198° at sunrise
- Eponym: Felix A. Vening Meinesz

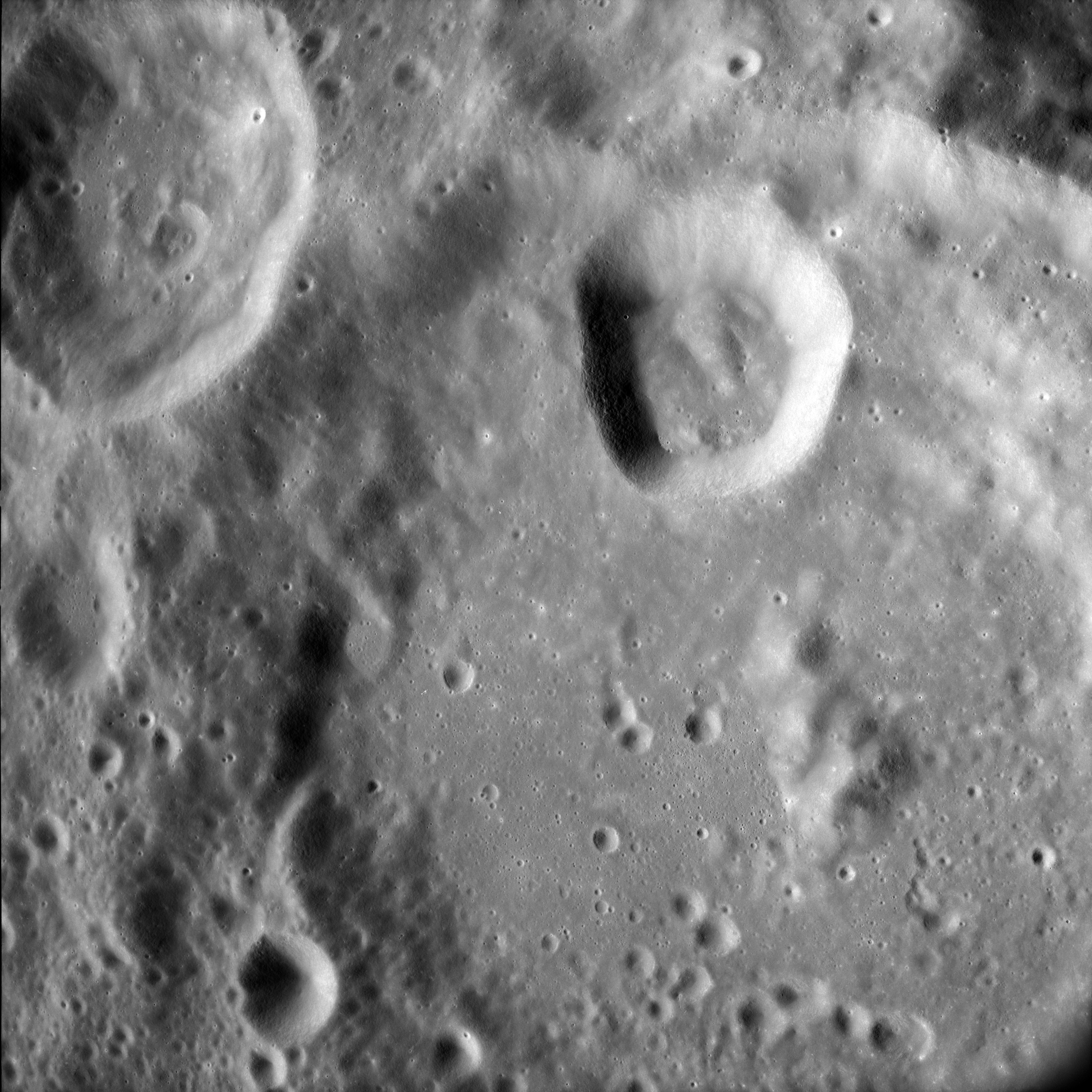
Most of Vening Meinesz, from Apollo 11

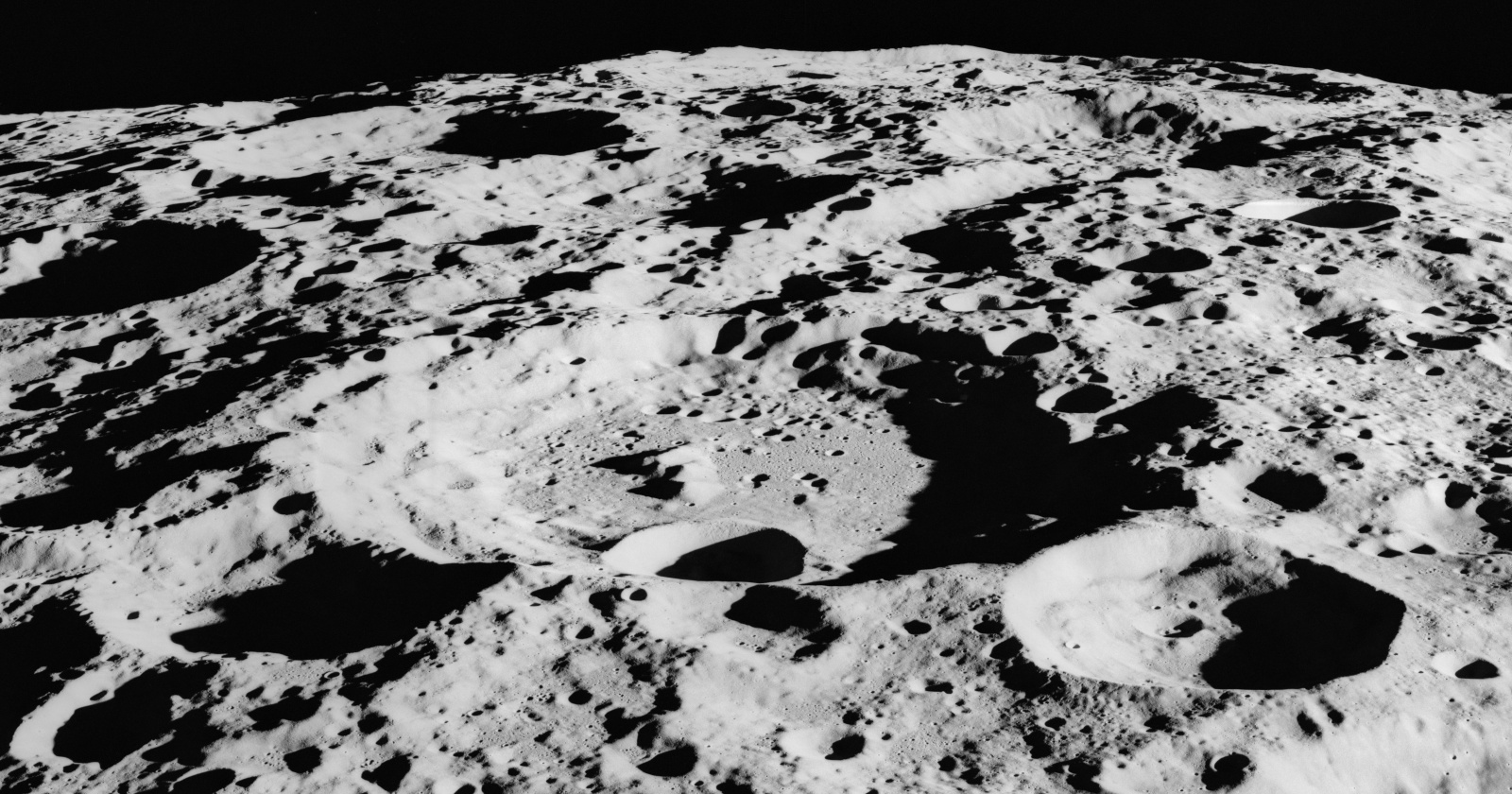
Oblique view facing south, from Apollo 16

Vening Meinesz is a lunar impact crater on the far side of the Moon. The northern inner wall of this crater lies along the lunar equator. To the north of this formation is the larger crater Mandel'shtam, and slightly farther to the south is the larger Keeler. Dewar is located less than one crater diameter to the southeast of Vening Meinesz.

This is an eroded feature with multiple small craterlets along the rim. As a result, the structure has been worn down and the rim edge is no longer well-defined. The largest of the impacts overlying this crater is a small crater along the bottom edge of the northern inner wall. The remainder of the interior floor is relatively level. Attached to the northwest outer rim is the satellite crater Vening Meinesz W, and attached along the northeast is Vening Meinesz C.

The crater was named after Dutch geophysicist and geodesist Felix A. Vening Meinesz by the IAU in 1970. Vening Meinesz was known as Crater 303 prior to naming.

== Satellite craters ==
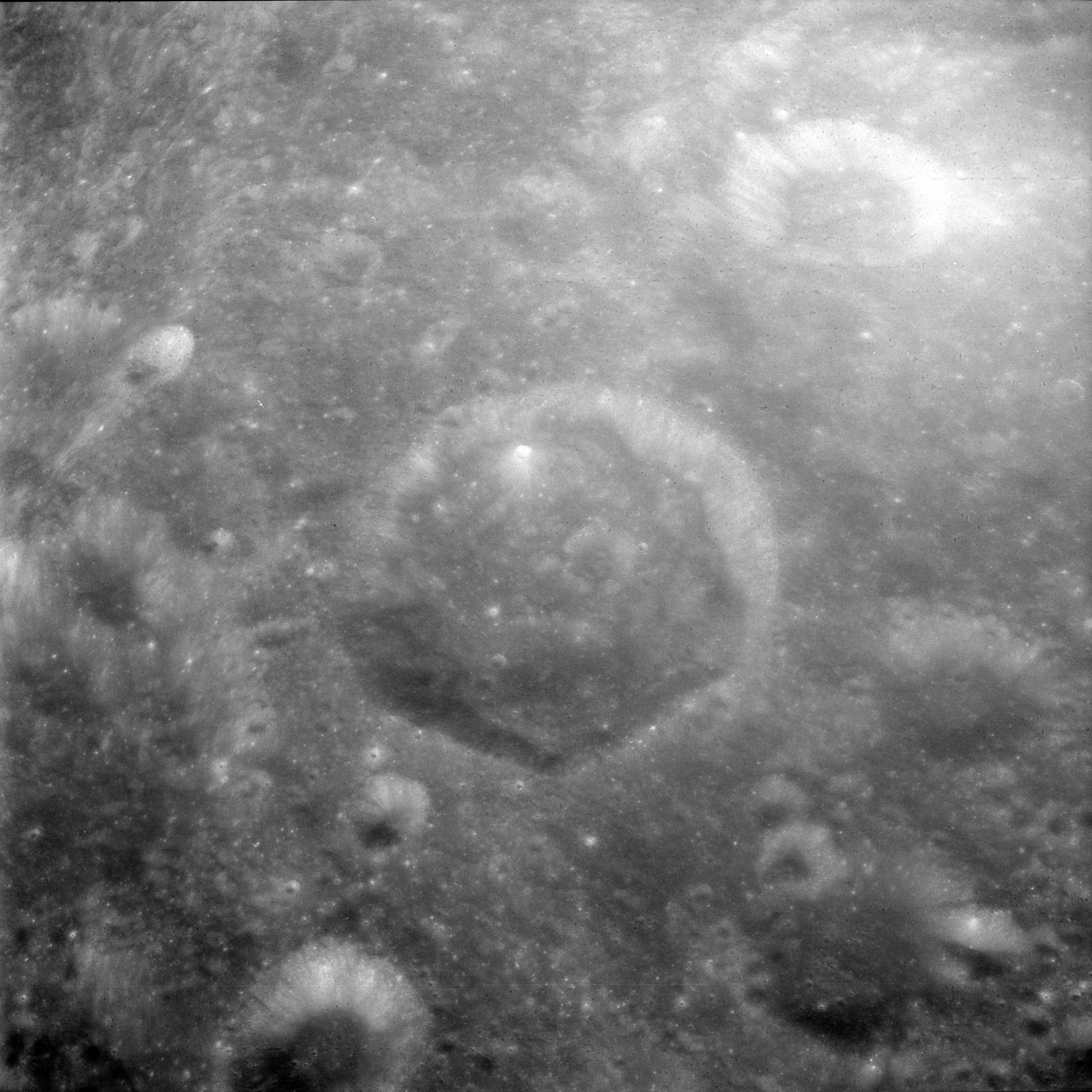
Vening Meinesz W, from Apollo 11

By convention these features are identified on lunar maps by placing the letter on the side of the crater midpoint that is closest to Vening Meinesz.

Vening Meinesz	Latitude	Longitude	Diameter
C	1.2° N	163.8° E	46 km
Q	2.6° S	161.0° E	17 km
T	0.4° S	159.3° E	15 km
W	1.5° N	161.0° E	39 km
Z	0.8° N	162.5° E	25 km
