= Ventris (crater) =

Crater on the Moon

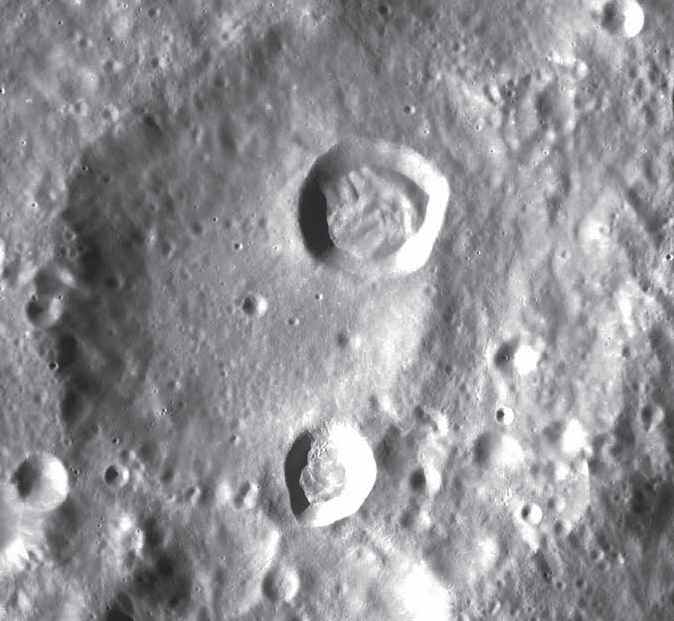
- LRO image, with Ventris A above center and Ventris M below center
- Coordinates: 4.9°S 158.0°E
- Diameter: 95 km (59 mi)
- Depth: Unknown
- Colongitude: 203° at sunrise
- Eponym: Michael Ventris

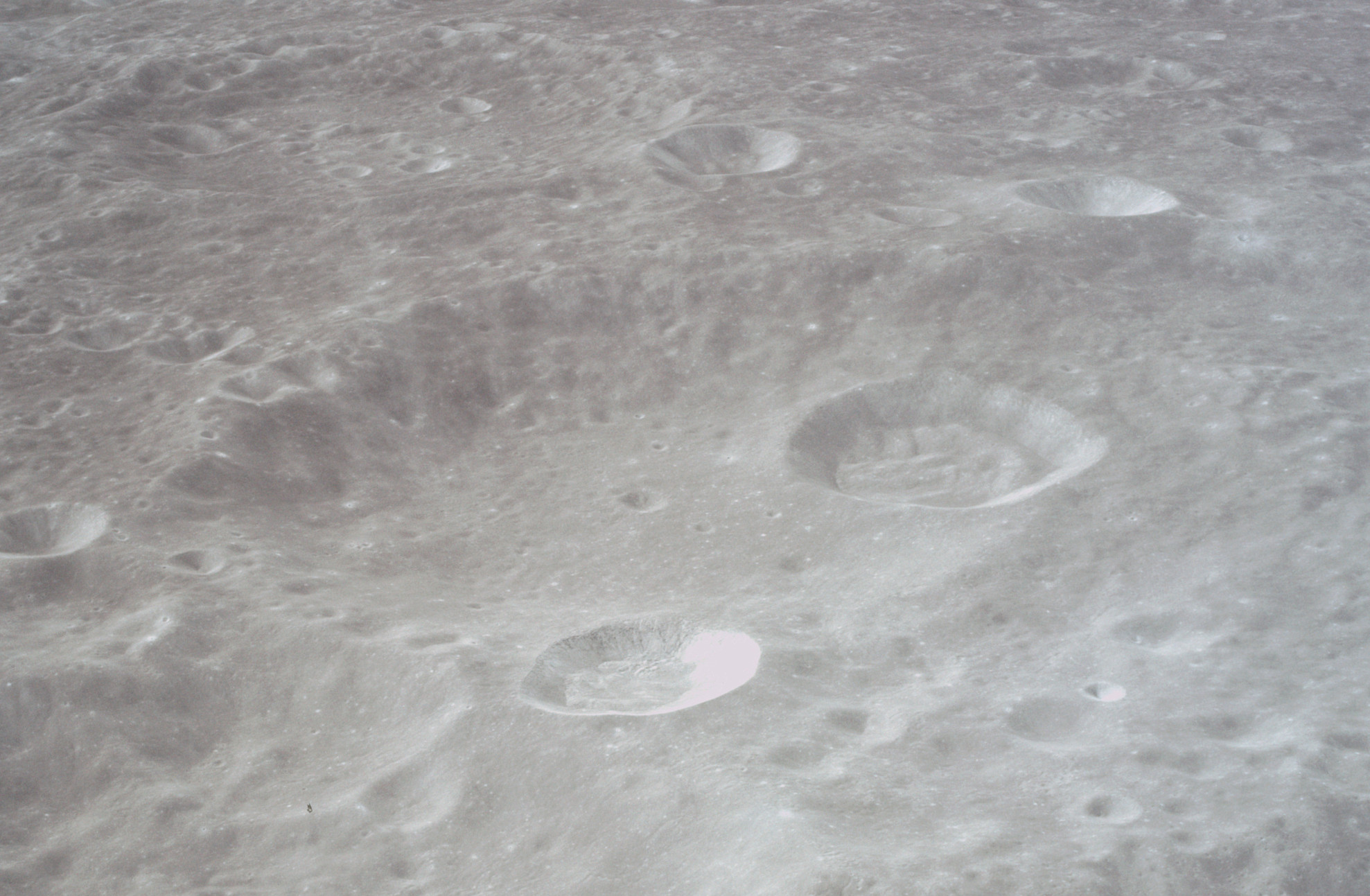
Oblique view from Apollo 17. The rays of Ventris M (below center) are perceptible in this image. Schliemann is in the upper left background.

Ventris is a lunar impact crater on the far side of the Moon. It is located between the crater Schliemann just to the northwest and the large Keeler which lies slightly farther to the southeast. One crater diameter to the northeast is Vening Meinesz.

Since it was formed, this crater has been heavily worn and eroded by subsequent impacts. Multiple craters lie across the rim and within the interior. The largest of these is Ventris C covering the northeastern rim. In the northern part of the floor is Ventris A. The southern floor contains Ventris M, a fresh impact crater with a small ray system and a relatively high albedo. The rays from this satellite extend in a skirt that covers most of Ventris. Narrower rays extend much farther to the northwest and southwest.

Ventris was formally named by the IAU in 1970 after Michael Ventris who deciphered Linear B. Ventris was known as Crater 301 prior to naming.

== Satellite craters ==
By convention these features are identified on lunar maps by placing the letter on the side of the crater midpoint that is closest to Ventris.

Ventris	Latitude	Longitude	Diameter
A	4.4° S	158.2° E	26 km
B	2.4° S	158.2° E	18 km
C	3.2° S	158.9° E	48 km
D	3.4° S	160.3° E	21 km
M	6.0° S	157.9° E	18 km
N	7.1° S	157.6° E	63 km
R	6.3° S	155.1° E	13 km

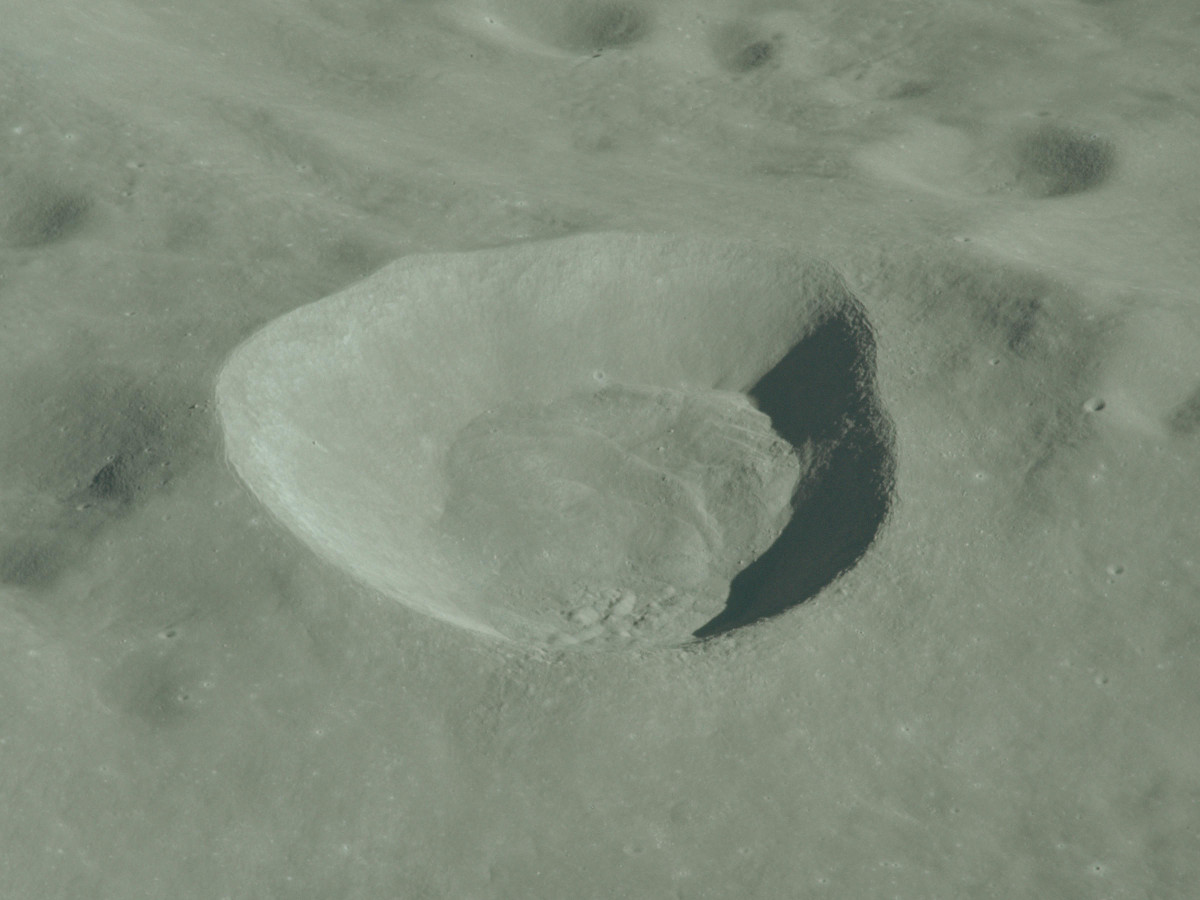
Oblique view of Ventris M, from Apollo 10, facing south
