= Mandelʹshtam (crater) =

Crater on the Moon

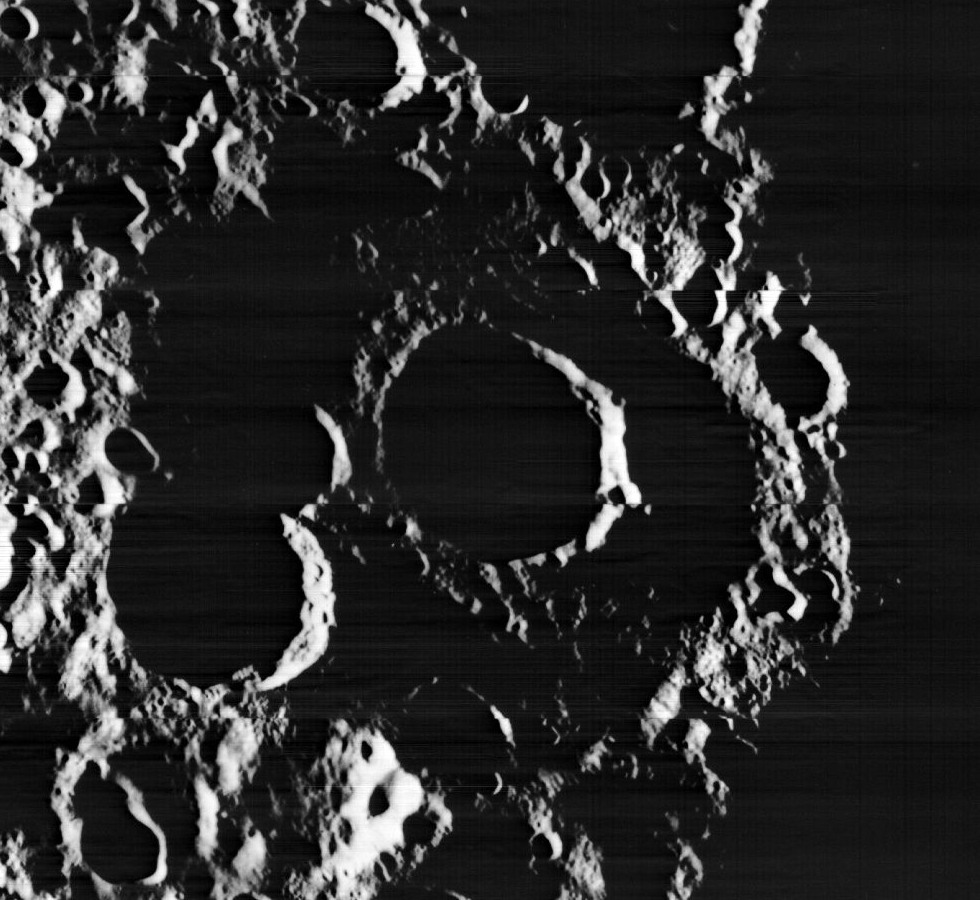
- Oblique Lunar Orbiter 1 image, at the terminator
- Coordinates: 5.4°N 162.4°E
- Diameter: 197 km
- Depth: Unknown
- Colongitude: 200° at sunrise
- Eponym: Leonid I. Mandelʹshtam

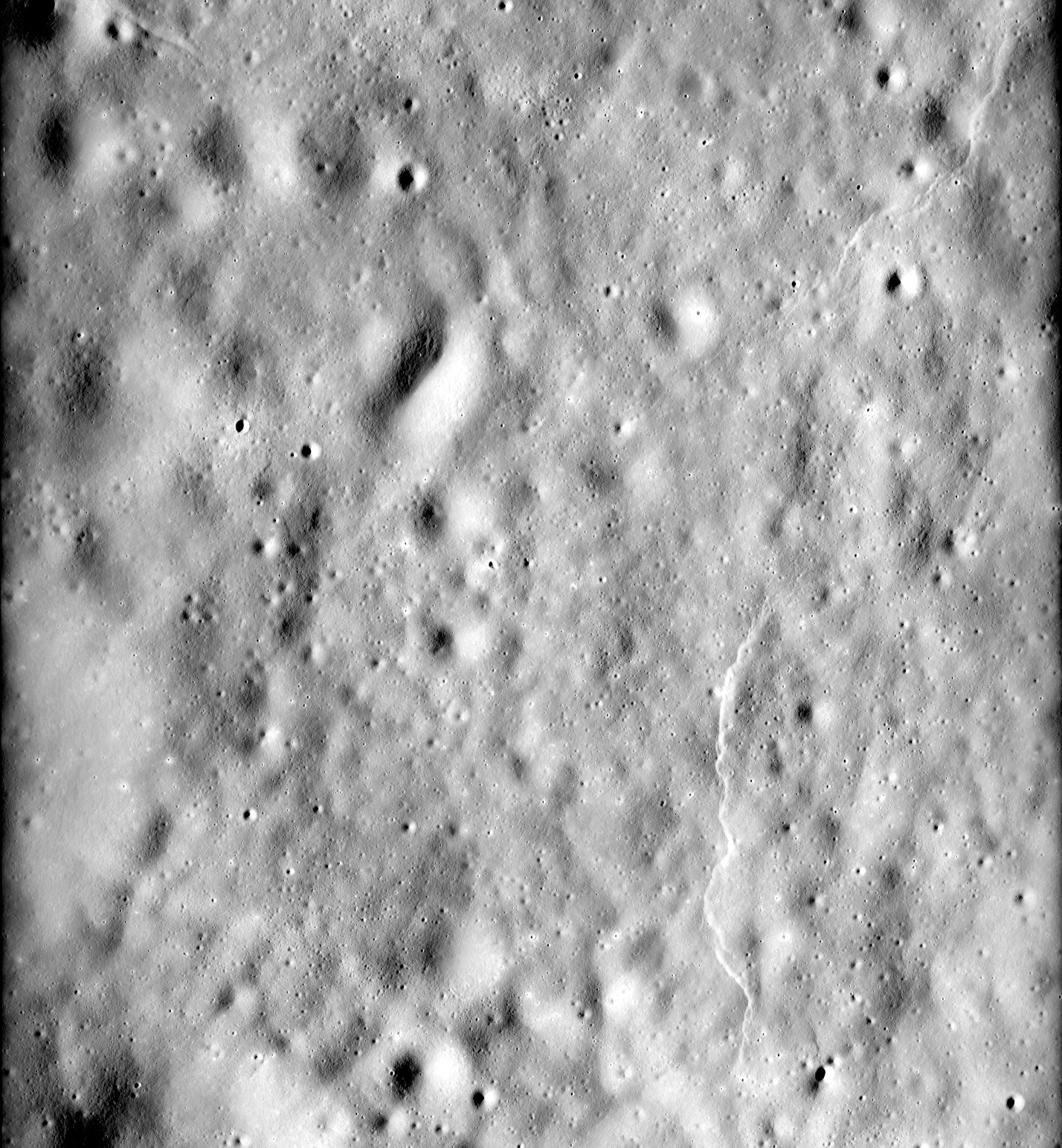
The floor of Mandelʹshtam, showing a typical highlands scarp at right. From Apollo 16.

Mandelʹshtam is the remains of a large crater on the Moon's far side. It is located within the proposed Chaplygin-Mandel’shtam Basin. Nearly attached to the northeast outer rim is the crater Papaleksi. To the south lies the crater Vening Meinesz.

The outer rim of this crater has been battered into near ruin, with sections forming only an irregular circular rise in the surface. Much of the rim consists of clefts, small craters, and ridges. The satellite crater Mandelʹshtam R breaks across the rim to the west-southwest, and Mandelʹshtam Y is attached to the northern edge.

The interior floor of the crater has not escaped bombardment, and the central portion is overlain by Mandelʹshtam A, a respectable crater in its own right. Mandelʹshtam N lies on the interior along the south-southwestern inner edge. The northwestern floor and to a lesser degree the southeast floor are relatively level, and have suffered less impact damage than elsewhere.

The crater was named after Soviet geophysicist and geodesist Leonid I. Mandelʹshtam by the IAU in 1970. Mandelʹshtam was known as Crater 220 prior to naming.

== Satellite craters ==
By convention these features are identified on lunar maps by placing the letter on the side of the crater midpoint that is closest to Mandelʹshtam.

Mandelʹshtam	Latitude	Longitude	Diameter
A	5.7° N	162.4° E	64 km
F	5.2° N	166.2° E	17 km
G	4.5° N	166.4° E	29 km
N	3.3° N	161.6° E	25 km
Q	2.4° N	158.8° E	20 km
R	4.5° N	159.8° E	57 km
T	5.7° N	160.4° E	37 km
Y	9.1° N	161.8° E	32 km

The small crater Mandelʹshtam F to the east has a small ray system with several faint, streaky rays overlaying the floor of Mandelʹshtam. It is fresh impact that is less than 150 million years old, and so dates to the Copernican period of the lunar geologic timescale.

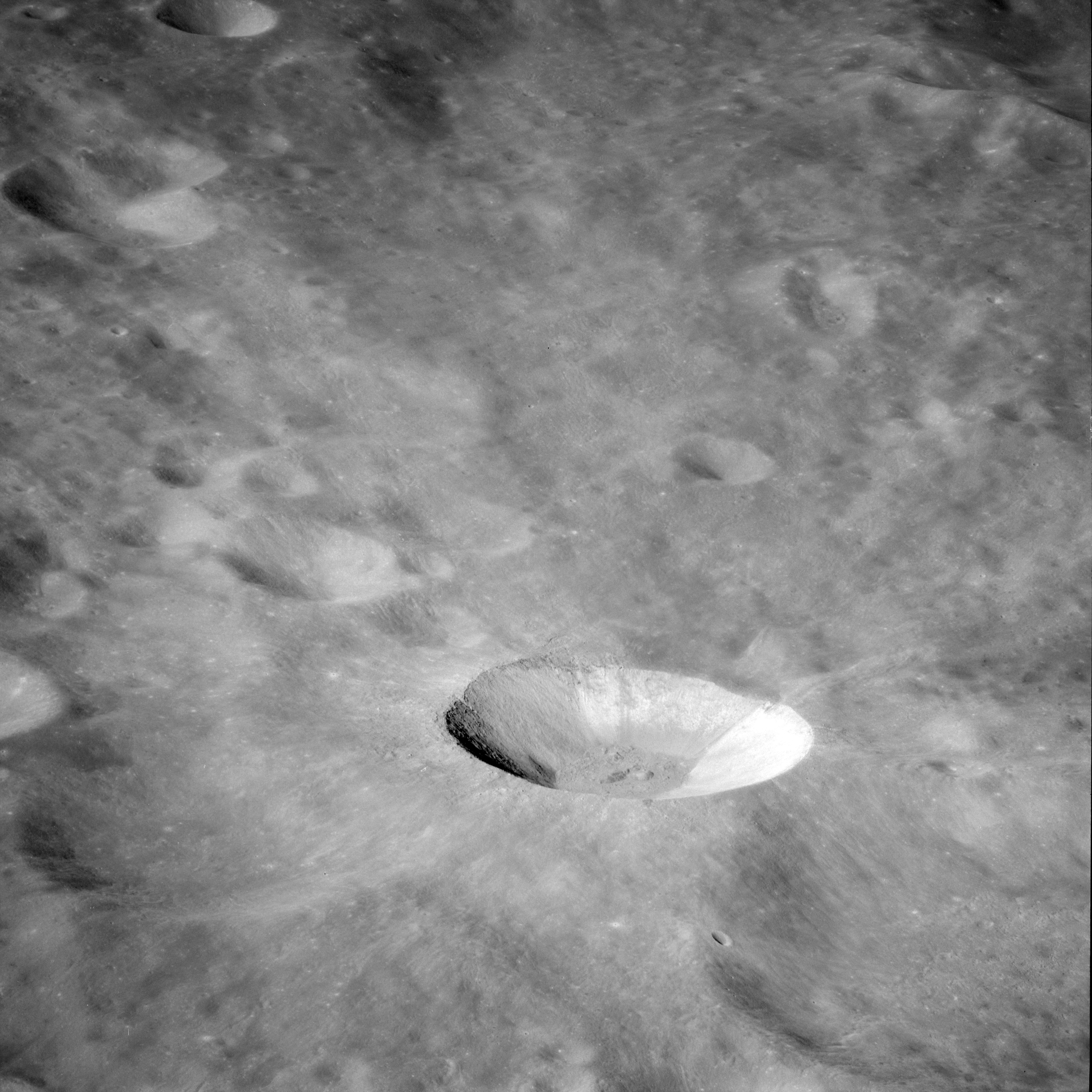
Oblique view from Apollo 11 of Mandelʹshtam F (below center) and the less obvious Mandelʹshtam G.

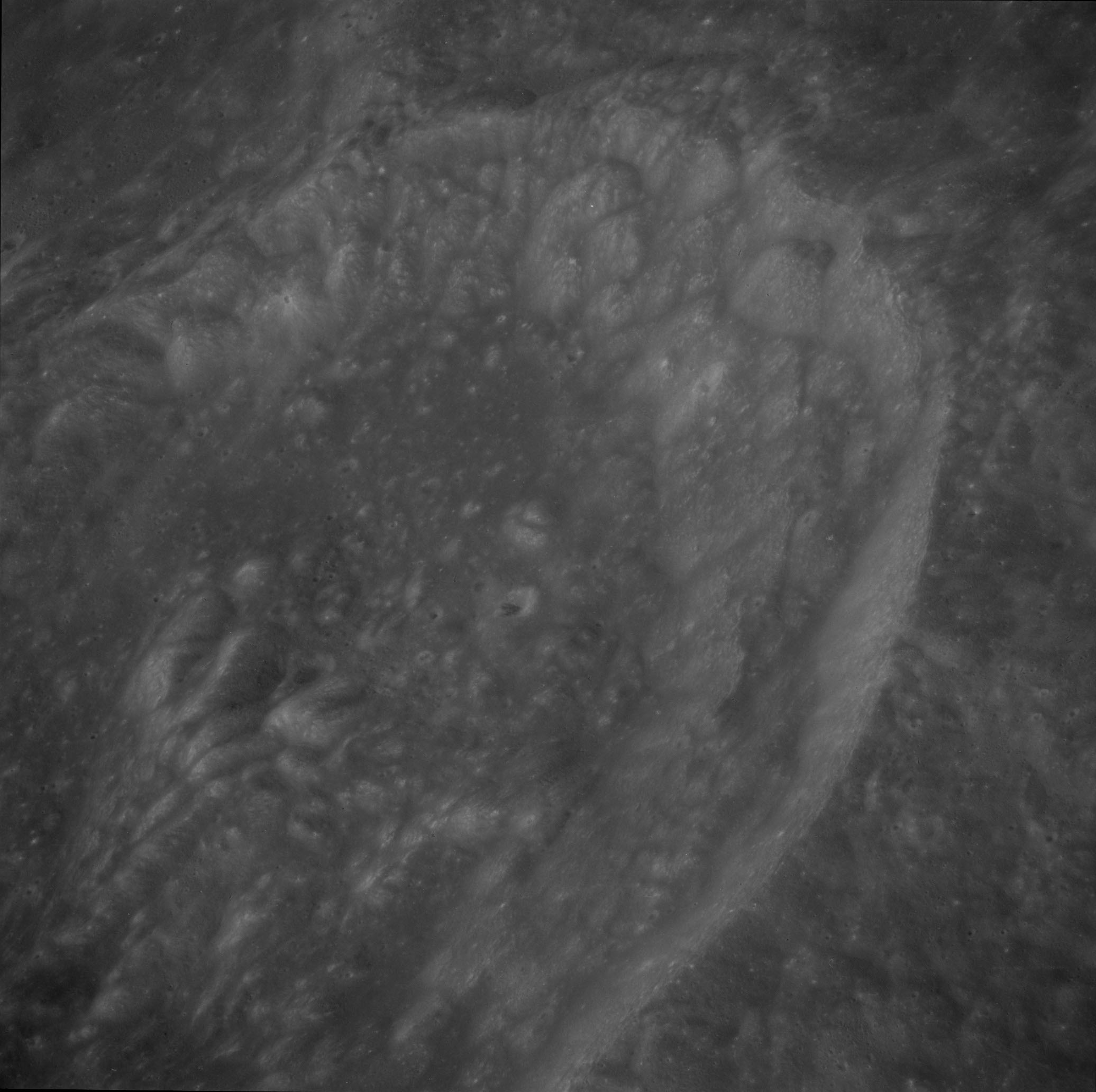
Oblique view of Mandelʹshtam R from Apollo 10.

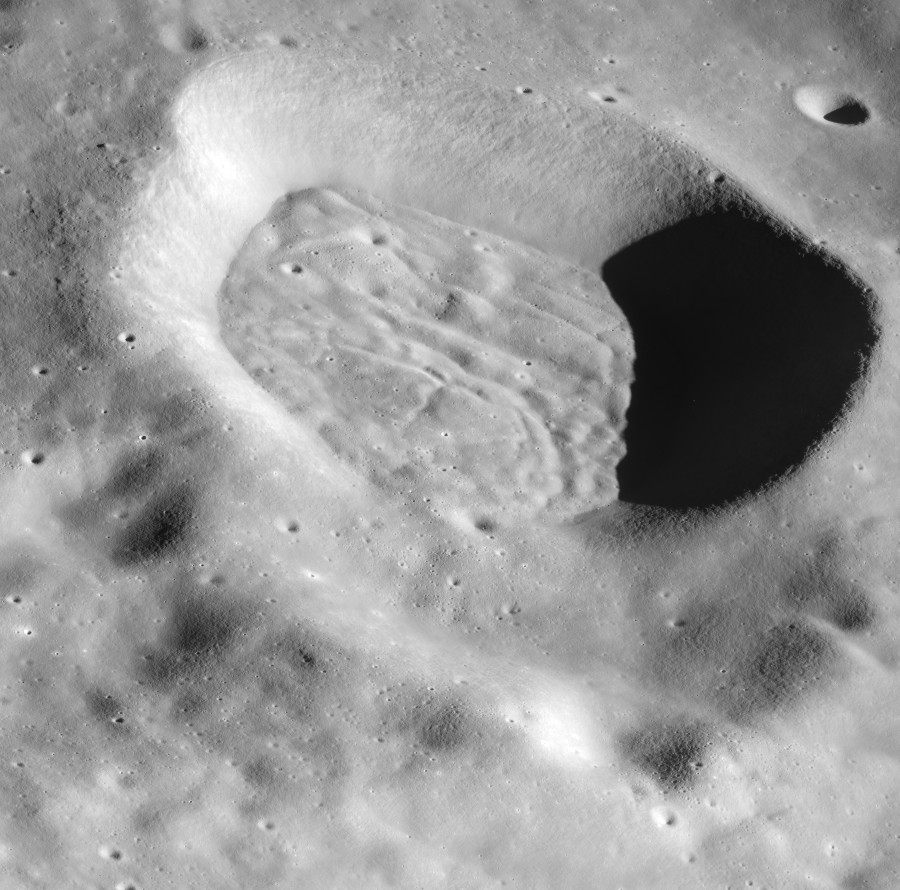
Mandelʹshtam Q from Apollo 16. The crater has a cracked floor that is heavily lineated and grooved.
