= Keeler (lunar crater) =

Crater on the Moon

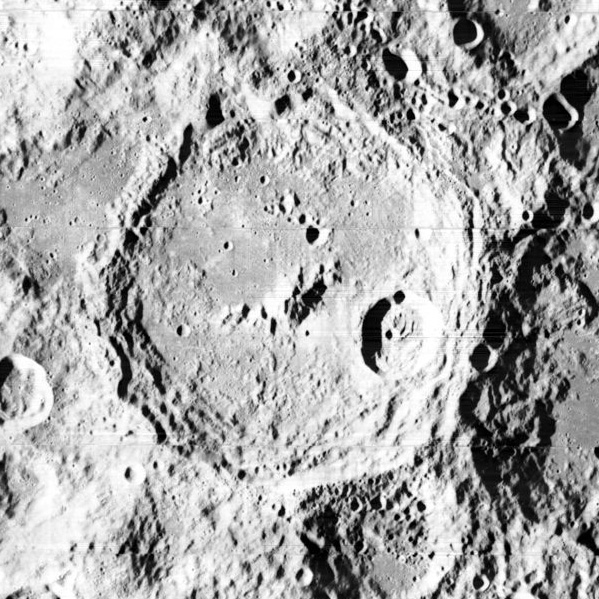
- Lunar Orbiter 2 image
- Coordinates: 10.2°S 161.9°E
- Diameter: 160 km
- Depth: 3.0 km
- Colongitude: 200° at sunrise
- Formation: Lower Imbrian
- Eponym: James E. Keeler

Keeler is a large lunar impact crater that lies on the Moon's far side. It is connected along the eastern edge to Heaviside, a walled plain of similar dimensions. Keeler, however, is the younger of the two formations, with more clearly delineated features. To the northeast of Keeler is the smaller crater Stratton, and to the northwest lies Ventris.

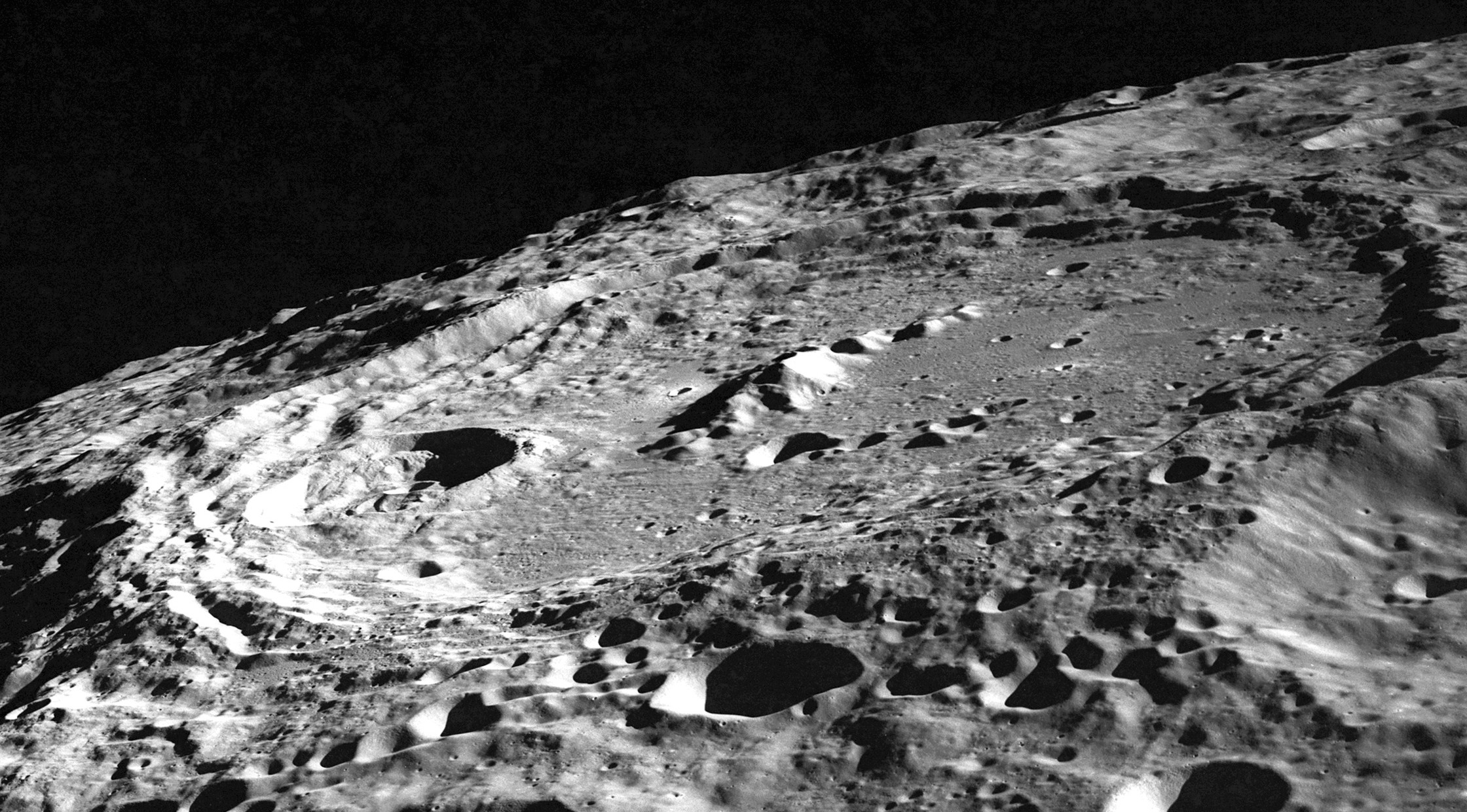
Oblique photo of Keeler from Apollo 10

Keeler is one of the largest craters of Lower (Early) Imbrian age. The outer rim of Keeler is roughly circular, with a straight segment where it is joined to Heaviside. The northern portion of the rim is more irregular, with an outward protuberance to the north-northwest. Portions of the inner wall have a terrace structure, especially along the southern half. Note the terraced walls of the crater. Within the crater interior, Planté lies on the eastern floor, adjacent to the inner wall. There is an interior ridge that runs from about the midpoint toward the west-southwest. The floor is generally level, with some areas of irregularity to the south. A few small craters mark the interior plain.

Anorthosite with a very low mafic abundance has been detected in the central peaks. The infrared spectrum of pure crystalline plagioclase has been identified on the central peak, as well as the central floor and the east rim. Measurements with the electron reflectometer instrument on board the Lunar Prospector showed that this crater is one of a number of impact sites that show demagnetization. The low magnetic reading lies at the center of this crater, and the reduced field extends outward to about one and a half crater diameters. Scientists believe that shock demagnetization is the cause.

The crater was named after American astronomer James Edward Keeler by the IAU in 1970. Keeler was known as Crater 302 prior to naming. A highly eroded crater that is west of Keeler and somewhat larger than it was designated Crater 300, but it is currently unnamed.

== Satellite craters ==
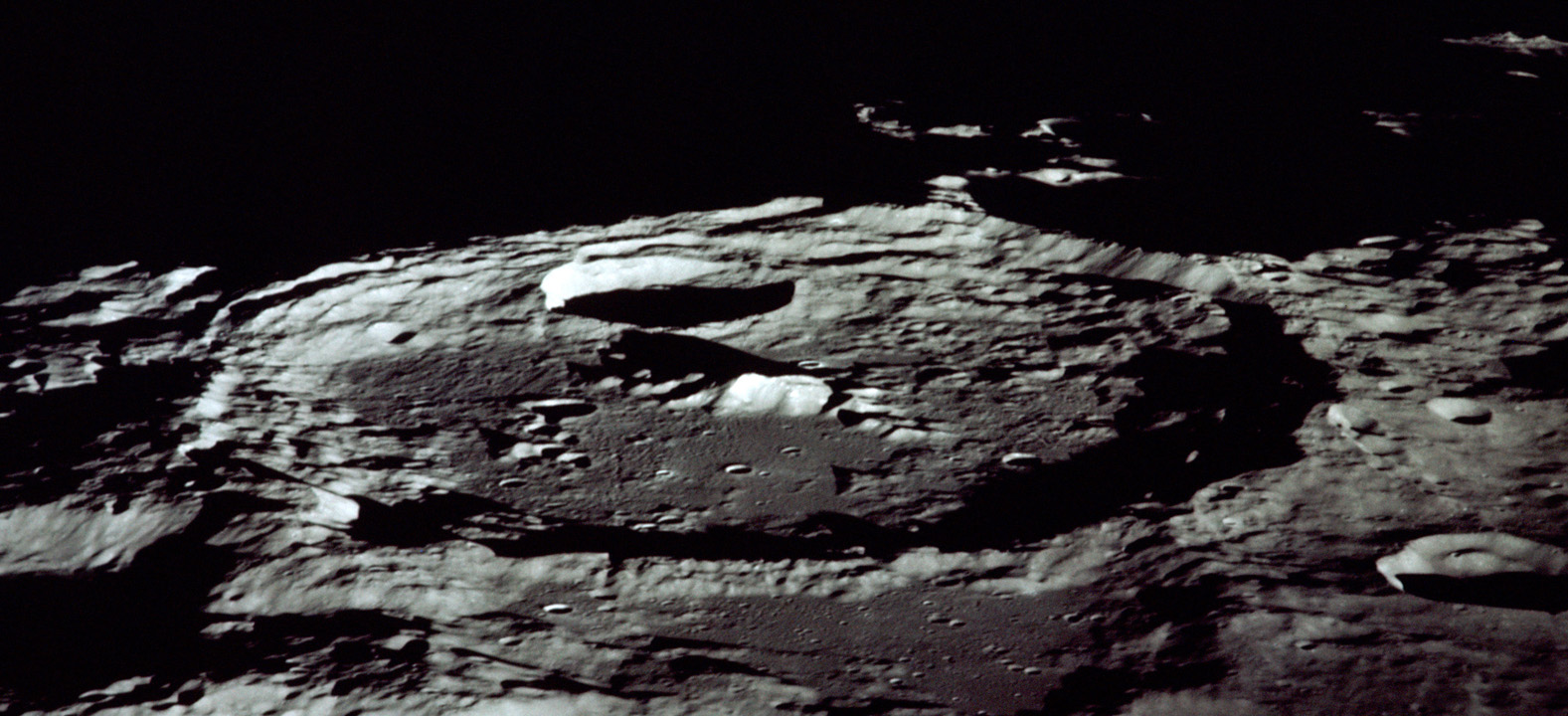
Oblique photo of Keeler from Apollo 13, with low sun angle (at the terminator)

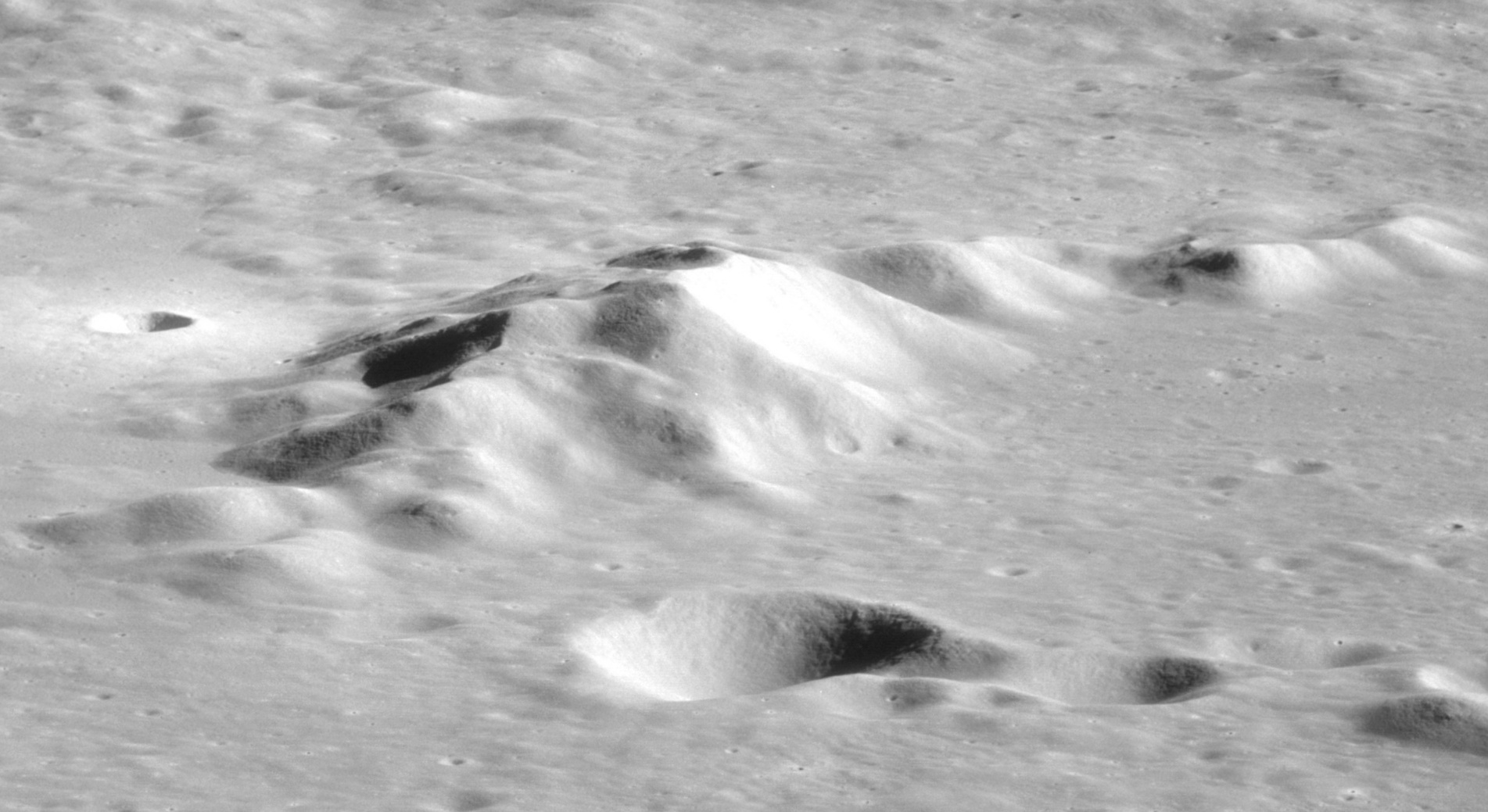
The central peak from Apollo 11. The highest peak is approximately 3.5 km above the crater floor.

By convention these features are identified on lunar maps by placing the letter on the side of the crater midpoint that is closest to Keeler.

Keeler	Latitude	Longitude	Diameter
L	13.3° S	163.2° E	71 km
S	11.4° S	158.0° E	30 km
U	9.1° S	156.9° E	29 km
V	8.9° S	158.3° E	53 km

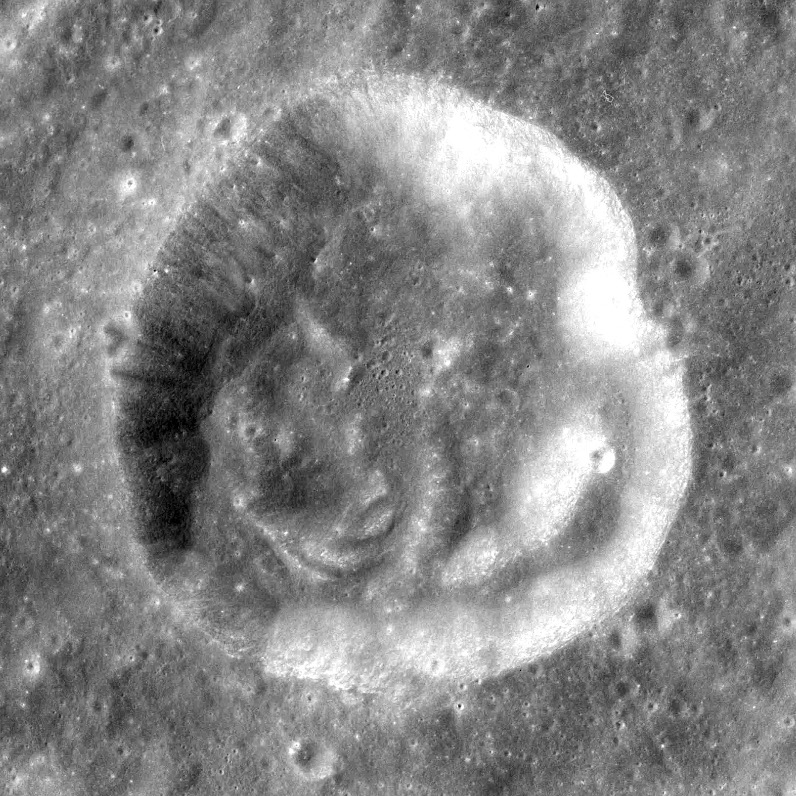
Keeler S crater photographed by Apollo 8
