= Heaviside (lunar crater) =

Crater on the Moon

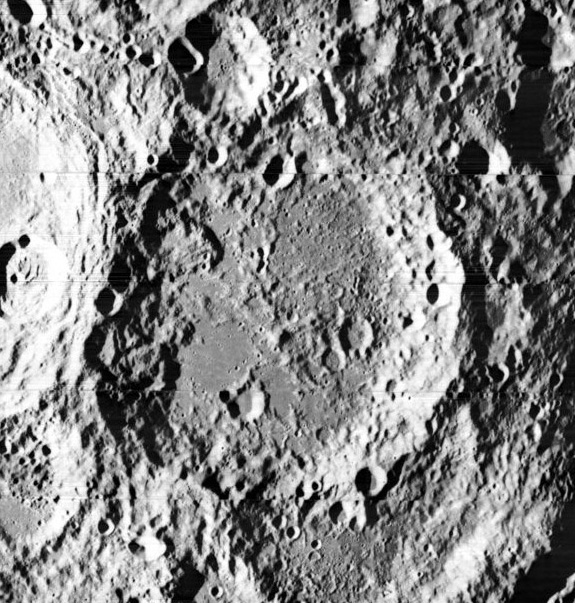
- Lunar Orbiter 2 image
- Coordinates: 10.4°S 167.1°E
- Diameter: 165 km
- Depth: 3.0 km
- Colongitude: 196° at sunrise
- Formation: Pre-Nectarian
- Eponym: Oliver Heaviside

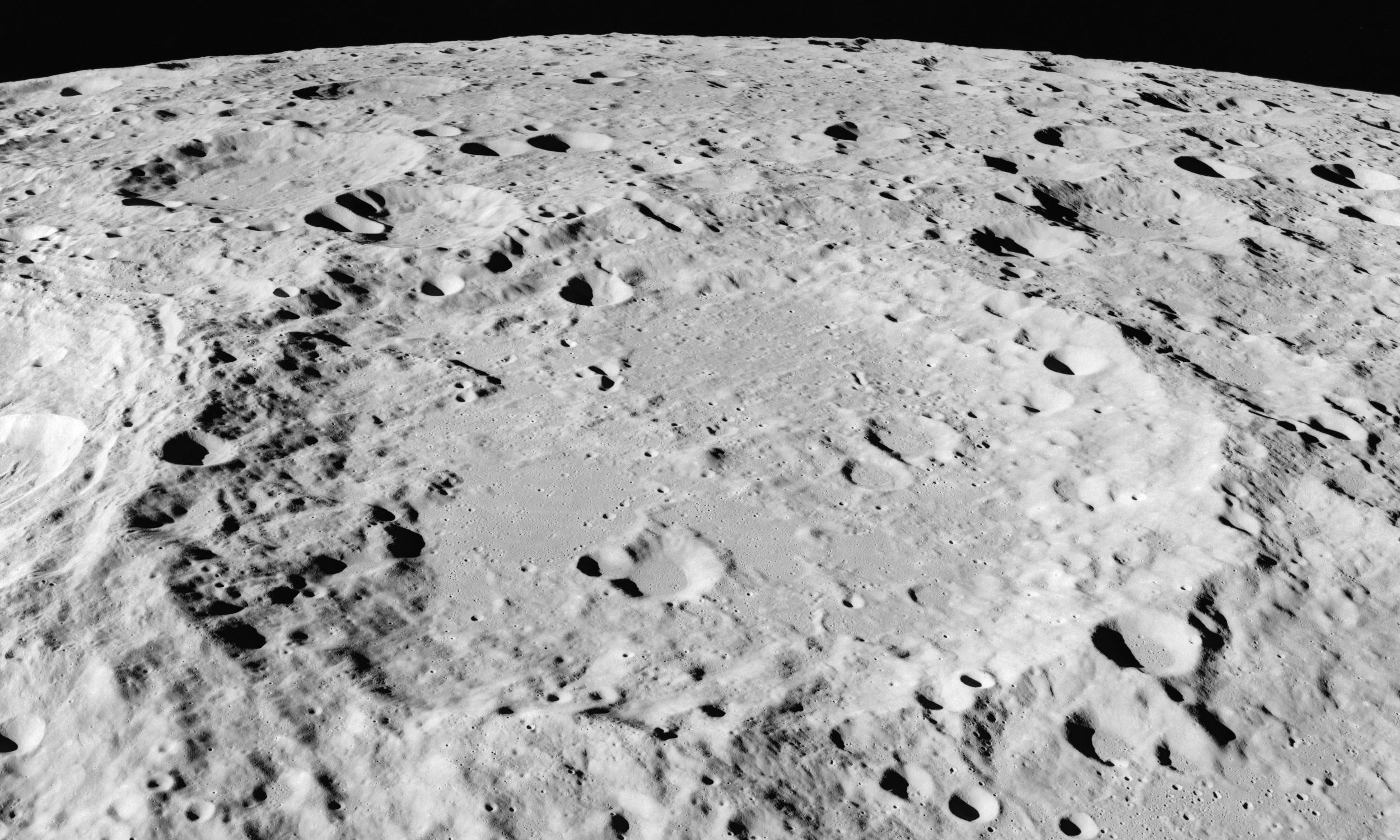
Oblique view of Heaviside from Apollo 17

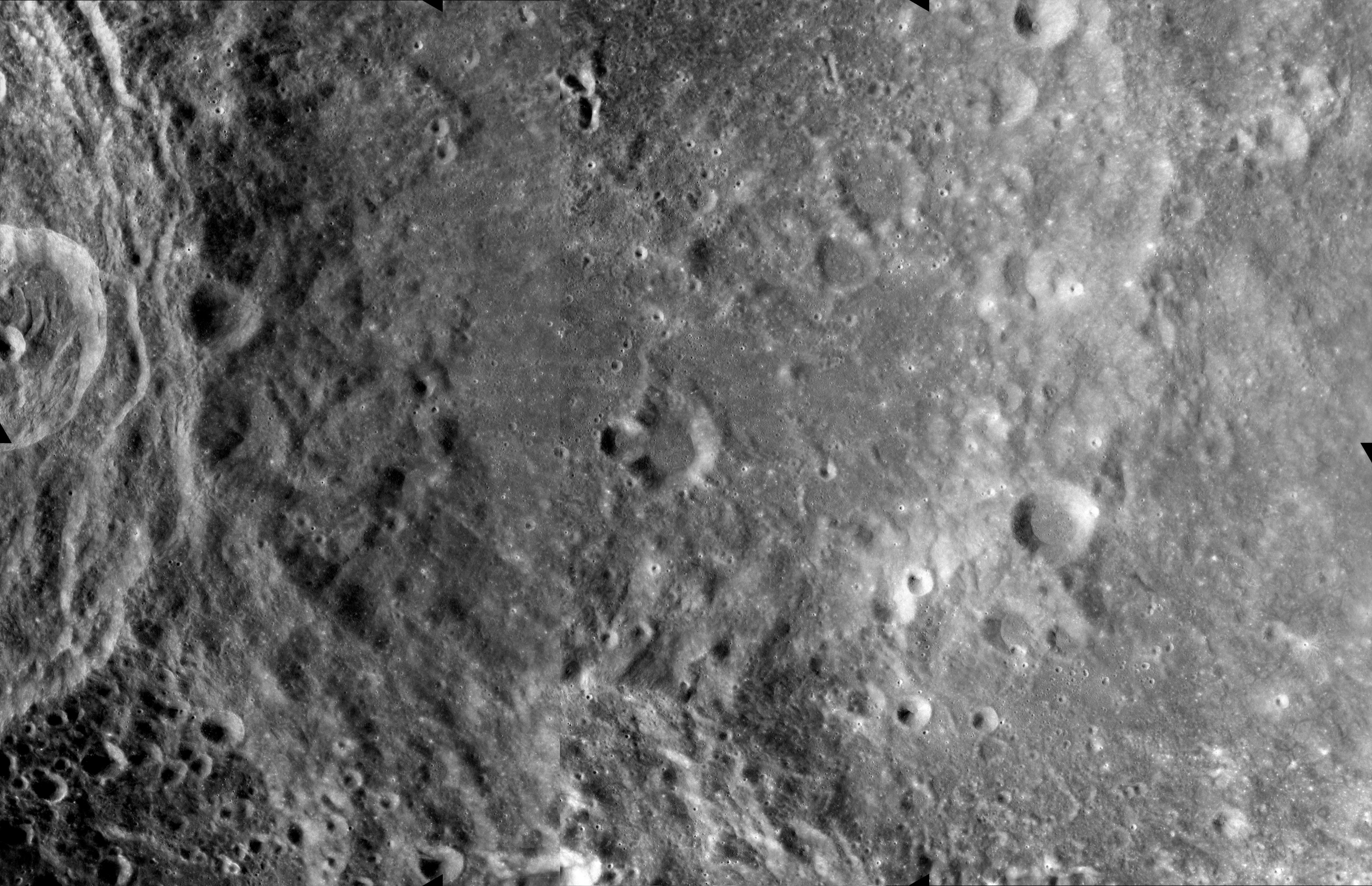
Southern Heaviside crater

Heaviside is a large lunar impact crater that is located on the far side of the Moon. It is attached to the eastern rim of the equally large walled plain Keeler, although Keeler is somewhat less eroded. To the northwest lies the crater Stratton, and to the southeast is the prominent Aitken.

The outer wall of Heaviside has been worn and eroded by subsequent impacts, particularly to the north and south. Only the eastern rim remains relatively intact, while the western rim has been slightly distorted by the adjacent Keeler impact.

The relatively flat interior floor is marked by many small craters and rugged terrain to the southeast and west. The most notable of these are the satellite craters Heaviside N in the south, Heaviside Z in the north, and the bowl-shaped Heaviside E near the eastern rim.

The crater was named after British mathematician and physicist Oliver Heaviside by the IAU in 1970. Heaviside was known as Crater 305 prior to naming.

== Satellite craters ==
By convention these features are identified on lunar maps by placing the letter on the side of the crater midpoint that is closest to Heaviside.

Heaviside	Latitude	Longitude	Diameter
B	5.5° S	169.3° E	23 km
C	5.7° S	171.1° E	28 km
D	6.7° S	171.8° E	18 km
E	10.2° S	169.2° E	12 km
F	10.8° S	172.8° E	14 km
K	13.3° S	168.5° E	110 km
N	11.8° S	166.6° E	18 km
Z	8.8° S	166.8° E	12 km
