= Morozov (crater) =

Crater on the Moon

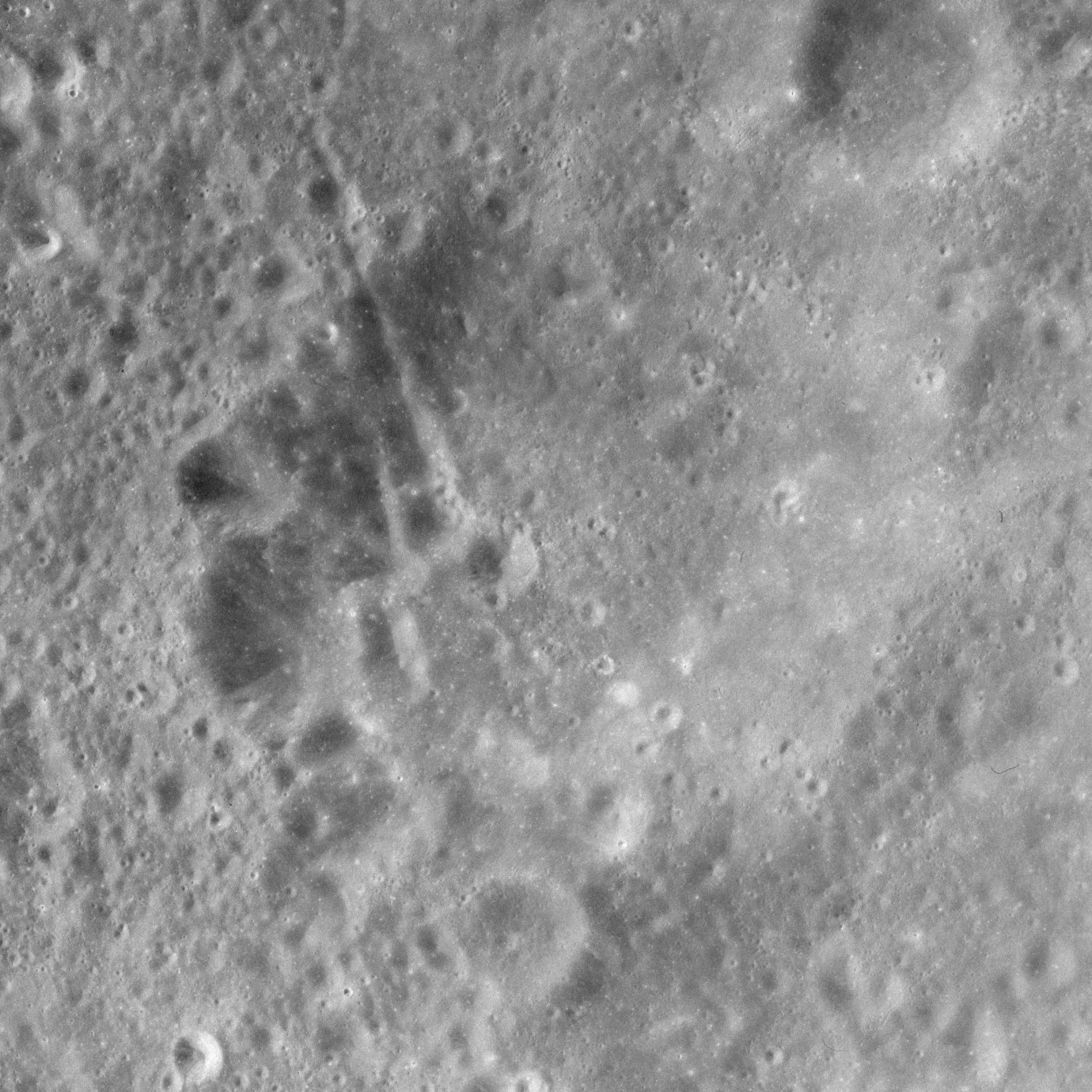
- Apollo 16 Mapping Camera image
- Coordinates: 5.0°N 127.4°E
- Diameter: 42 km
- Depth: Unknown
- Colongitude: 233° at sunrise
- Eponym: Nikolai Morozov

Morozov is a lunar impact crater that is located on the far side of the Moon. It lies to the north of the crater Gregory and to the east-southeast of Ibn Firnas. Less than two crater diameters to the west-southwest of Morozov is Zanstra.

This is a worn and eroded crater formation, particularly along the western rim where a pair of parallel marks (either grooves or crater chains) cross the inner wall, running to the south-southeast. It includes a pair of short lobate scarps. No impacts of note lie along the rim or crater interior, although the side is also somewhat damaged along the northeast. The crater is otherwise unremarkable.

The crater was named after Russian natural scientist Nikolai Morozov by the IAU in 1970. Some sources list this crater's name as Morosov.

== Satellite craters ==
By convention these features are identified on lunar maps by placing the letter on the side of the crater midpoint that is closest to Morozov.

Morozov	Latitude	Longitude	Diameter
C	6.1° N	128.5° E	10 km
E	6.0° N	130.2° E	15 km
F	5.4° N	130.0° E	60 km
Y	7.3° N	127.0° E	45 km

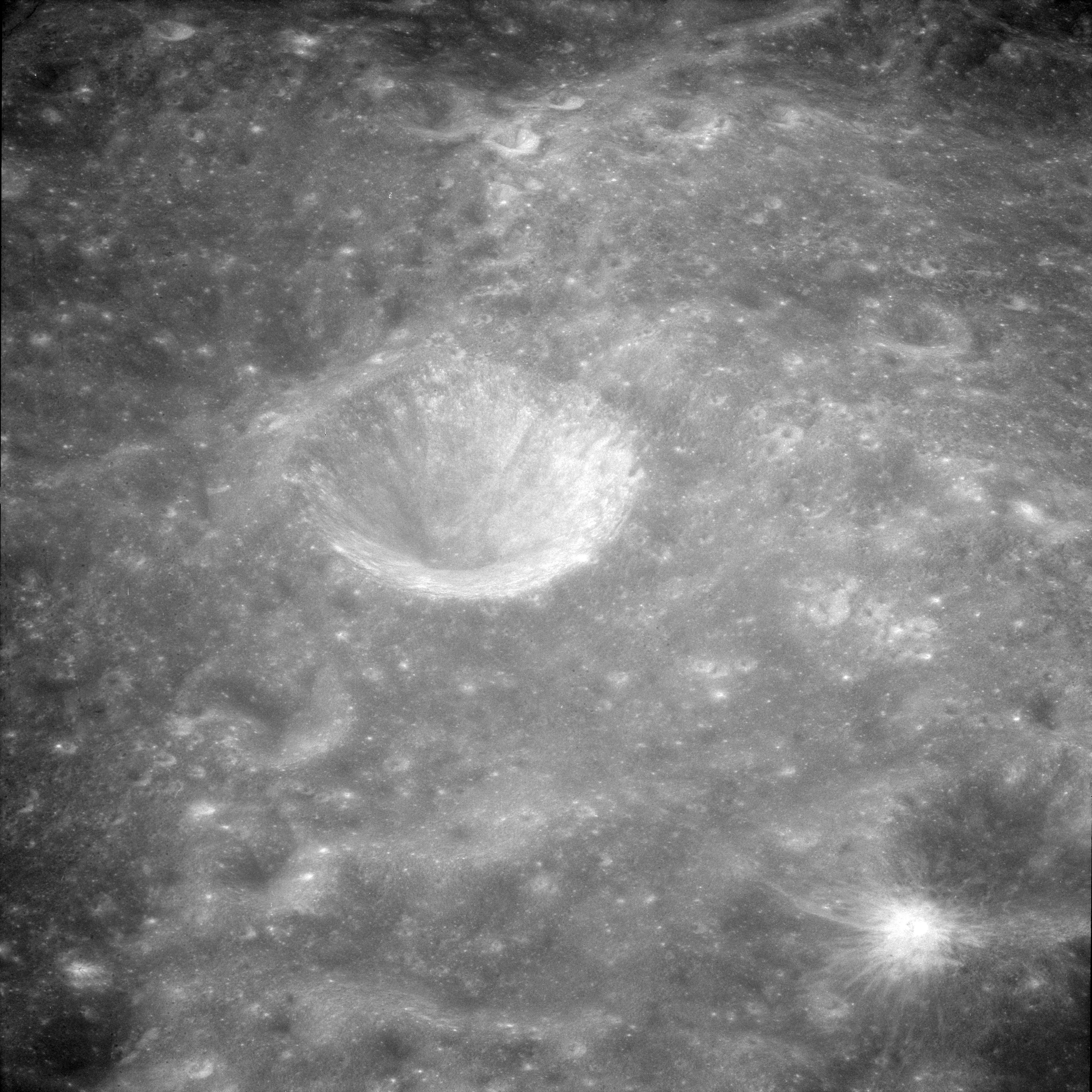
Morozov E, from Apollo 11

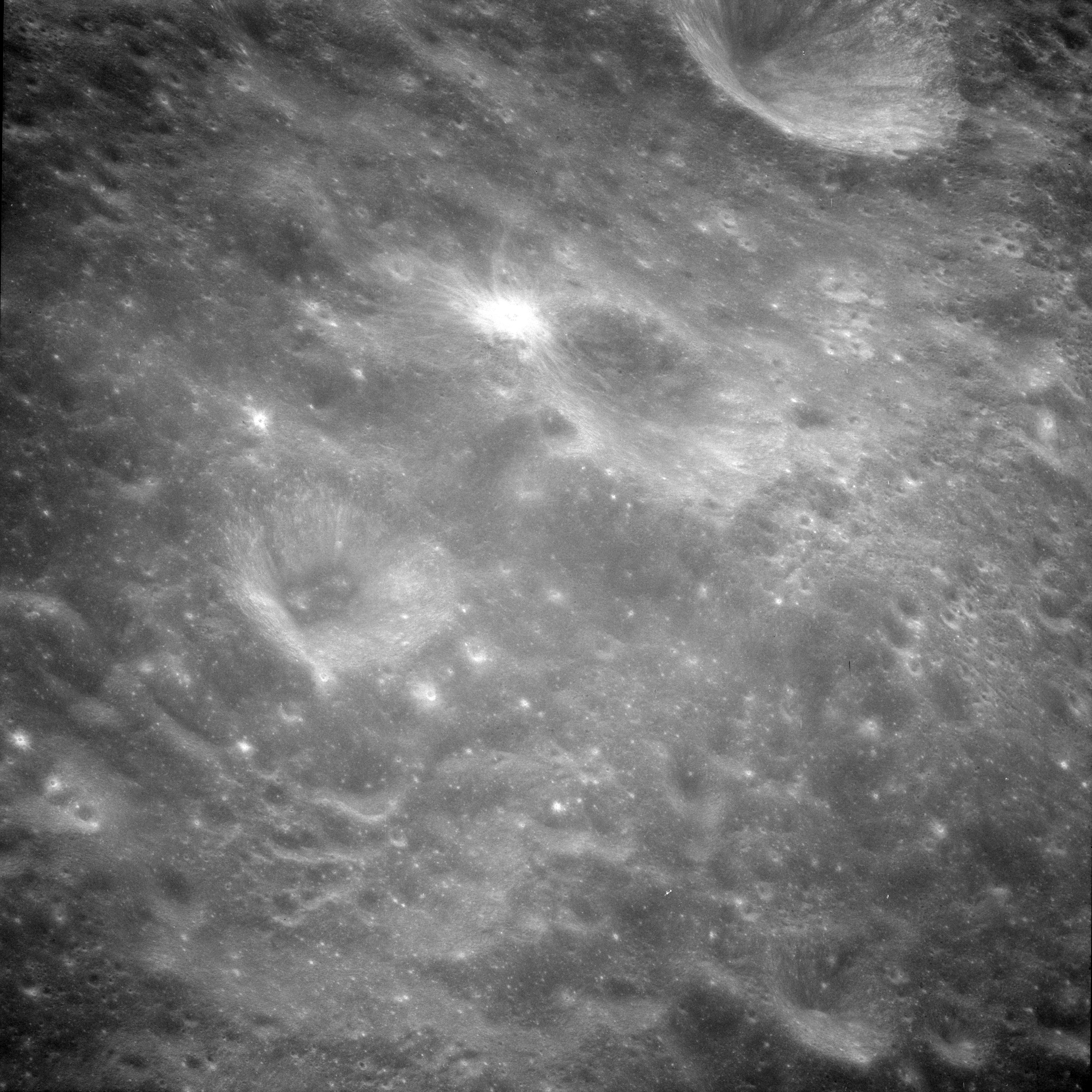
Most of Morozov F, with part of Morozov E, also from Apollo 11
