= Zanstra (crater) =

Crater on the Moon

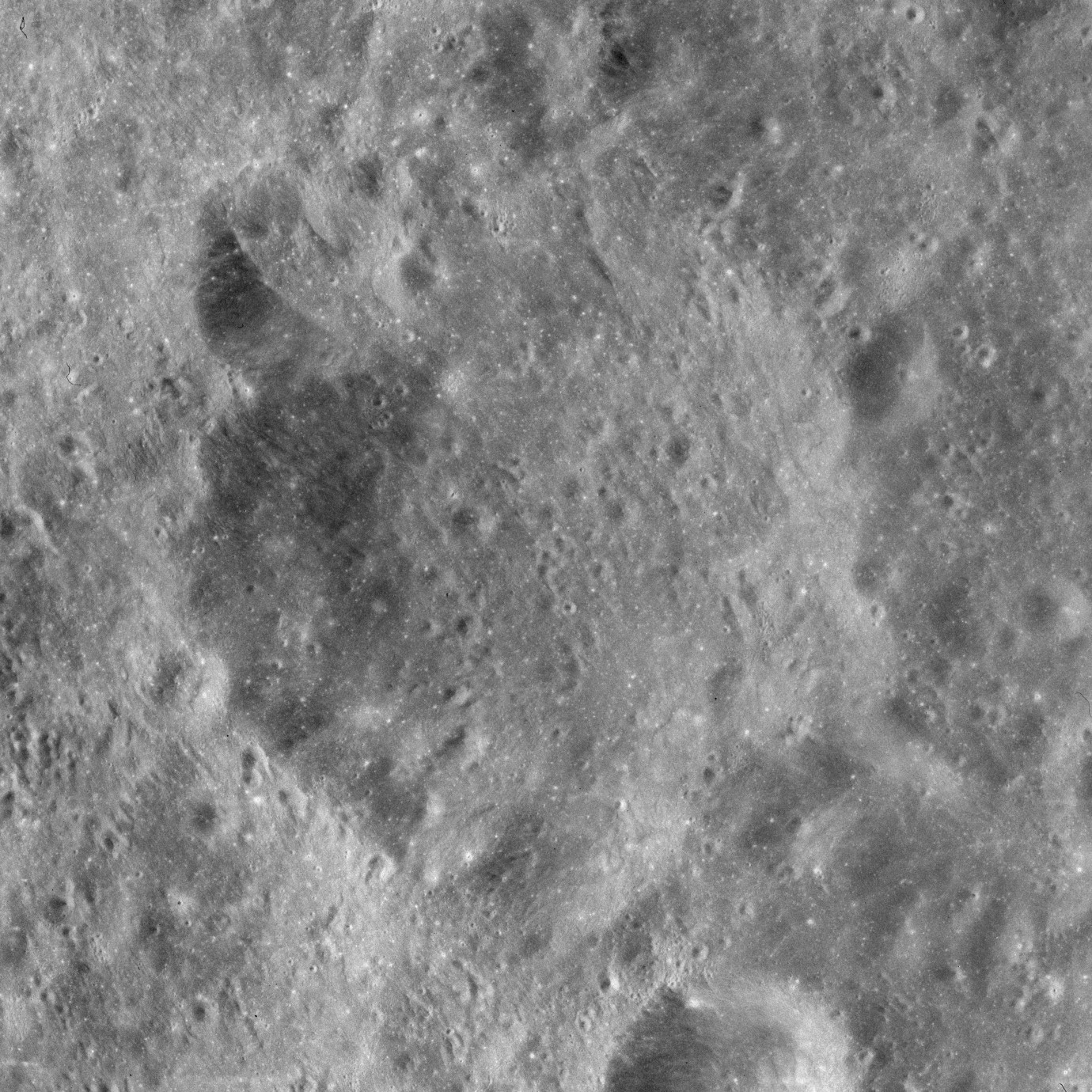
- Apollo 16 Mapping Camera image
- Coordinates: 2.9°N 124.7°E
- Diameter: 42 km
- Colongitude: 236° at sunrise
- Eponym: Herman Zanstra

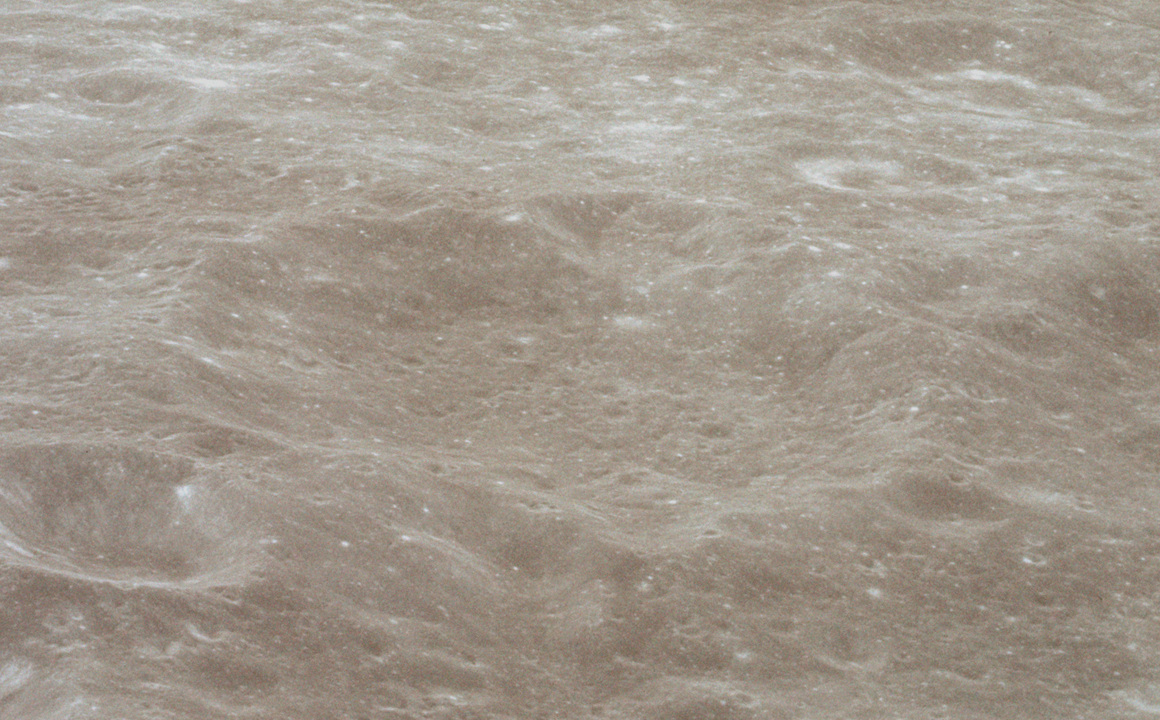
Oblique view facing northwest from Apollo 17

Zanstra is a lunar impact crater that is located on the far side of the Moon. It was named after the Dutch astronomer Herman Zanstra. It lies to the southeast of the crater pair Ibn Firnas and King, and northwest of Gregory. This is a low, eroded formation that is difficult to distinguish from its surroundings. The interior floor is level and not significantly impacted.

== Satellite craters ==
By convention these features are identified on lunar maps by placing the letter on the side of the crater midpoint that is closest to Zanstra.

| Zanstra | Latitude | Longitude | Diameter |
|---|---|---|---|
| A | 4.5° N | 125.2° E | 36 km |
| K | 2.0° N | 125.2° E | 14 km |
| M | 1.1° N | 125.0° E | 23 km |
