= Zanstra method =

Method to determine the temperature of central stars of planetary nebulae

The Zanstra method is a method to determine the temperature of central stars of planetary nebulae. It was developed by Herman Zanstra in 1927.

It is assumed that the nebula is optically thick in the Lyman continuum, which means that all ionizing photons from the central star are absorbed inside the nebula. Based on this assumption, the intensity ratio of a stellar reference frequency to a nebular line such as Hβ can be used to determine the central star's effective temperature.

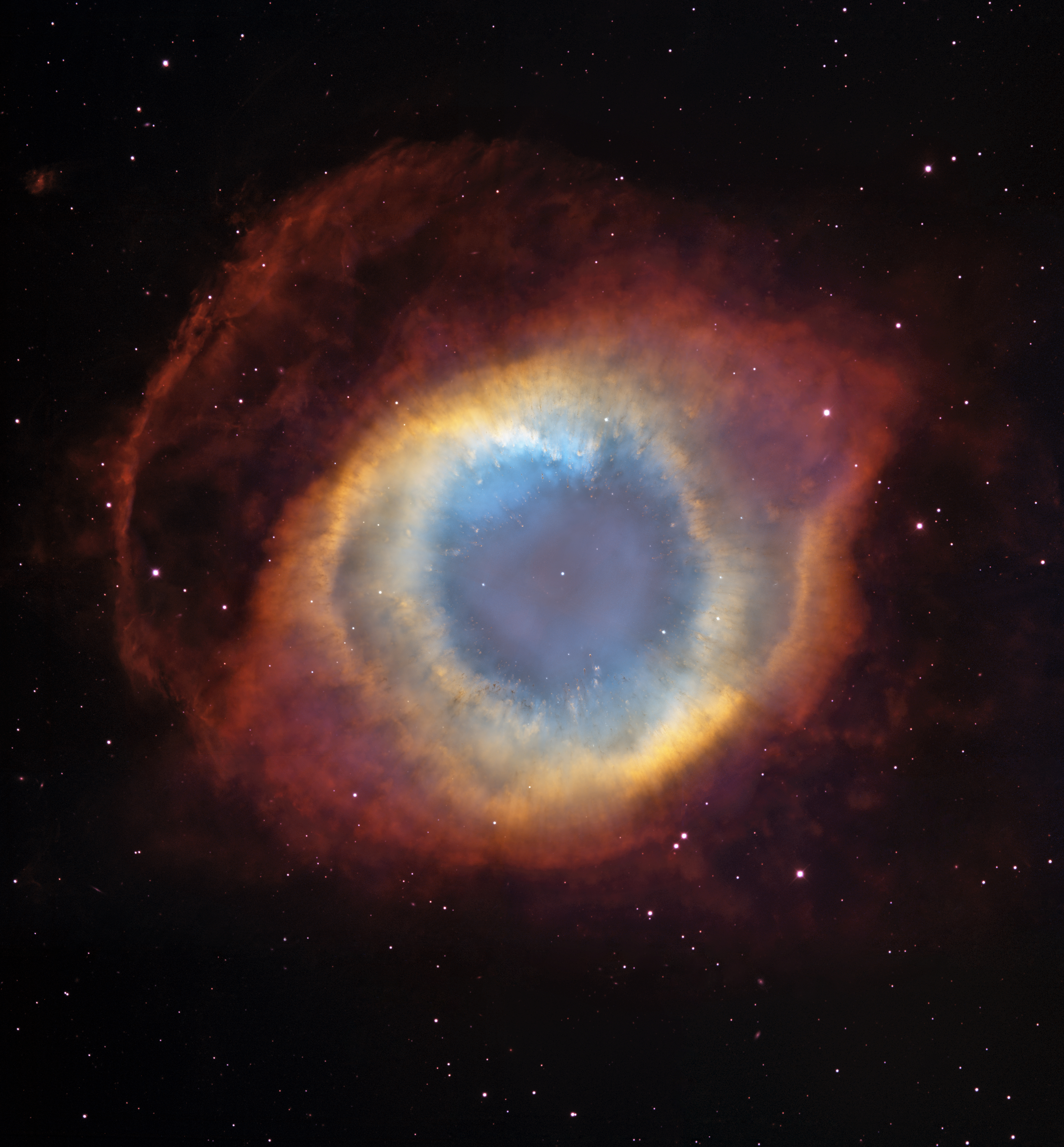
NGC 7293, The Helix Nebula, a planetary nebula Credit: NASA, ESA, and C.R. O'Dell (Vanderbilt University)

== Zanstra method for a nebula of hydrogen ==
For a pure hydrogen nebula, the ionization equilibrium states that the number per unit time of ionizing photons from the central star has to be balanced by the rate of recombinations of protons and electrons to neutral hydrogen inside the Strömgren sphere of the nebula. Ionizations can only be caused by photons having at least the frequency $\nu_0$, corresponding to the ionization potential of hydrogen which is 13.6eV:

$\int_{\nu_0}^\infty \frac{L_\nu}{h\nu} d\nu = \int_0^{r_1} n_p n_e \alpha_B dV$

Here, $r_1$ is the radius of the Strömgren sphere and $n_p, n_e$ are the number densities of protons and electrons, respectively. The luminosity of the central star is denoted by $L_\nu$ and $\alpha_B$ is the recombination coefficient to the excited levels of hydrogen.

The ratio between the number of photons emitted by the nebula in the Hβ line and the number of ionizing photons from the central star can then be estimated:

$\frac{L_{\nu_{H\beta}}}{\int_{\nu_0}^\infty \frac{L_\nu}{h\nu} d\nu} \approx h\nu_{H\beta} \frac{\alpha_{H\beta}^\text{eff}}{\alpha_B}$

where $\alpha_{H\beta}^\text{eff}$ is the effective recombination coefficient for Hβ.

Given a stellar reference frequency $\nu_s$, the Zanstra ratio is defined by

$Z = \frac{L_{\nu_s}}{\int_{\nu_0}^\infty \frac{L_\nu}{h\nu} d\nu} = h\nu_{H\beta} \frac{\alpha_{H\beta}^\text{eff}}{\alpha_B} \frac{F_{\nu_s}}{F_{H\beta}}$

with $F_{\nu_s}$ and $F_{H\beta}$ being the fluxes in the stellar reference frequency and in Hβ, respectively. Using the second formula, the Zanstra ratio can be determined by observations. On the other hand, applying model stellar atmospheres, theoretical Zanstra ratios may be computed in dependence of the central star's effective temperature which may be fixed by comparison with the observed value of the Zanstra ratio.
