= Herman Zanstra =

Dutch astronomer (1894–1972)

Herman Zanstra (November 3, 1894, Schoterland – October 2, 1972, Haarlem) was a Dutch astronomer.

Zanstra was born near Heerenveen in Friesland. In 1917 he graduated with an Engineer's degree in chemical engineering from the Delft Institute of Technology. While working in Delft for four years, the last two as a high school teacher, he wrote a highly theoretical and mathematical paper on relative motion which he sent to William Francis Gray Swann. Swann, then offered him to earn a Ph.D. degree in theoretical physics with him at the University of Minnesota at Minneapolis, which he did in two years time by expanding on his paper (dissertation: A Study of Relative Motion in Connection with Classical Mechanics, 1923). After another year with Swann, now in Chicago, and a year at various labs in the Netherlands and Germany and two months at Niels Bohr's lab in Copenhagen, he became a postdoc at Caltech. Here he wrote a famous paper, An Application of the Quantum Theory to the Luminosity of Diffuse Nebulae, which for the first time provided a quantitative method (the "Zanstra method") for understanding the luminosity of nebulas and comets.

After teaching briefly at the University of Washington he went to London and eventually to the University of Amsterdam. World War II left him stranded in South Africa, and he therefore took up a teaching position in Durban, but returned to Europe after the war. In 1949 he became member of the Royal Netherlands Academy of Arts and Sciences.

He won the Gold Medal of the Royal Astronomical Society in 1961.

The lunar crater Zanstra is named after him, as is Asteroid 2945 Zanstra.

== Sources ==
- Bio and discussion of the Zanstra method
