= Gregory (lunar crater) =

Crater on the Moon

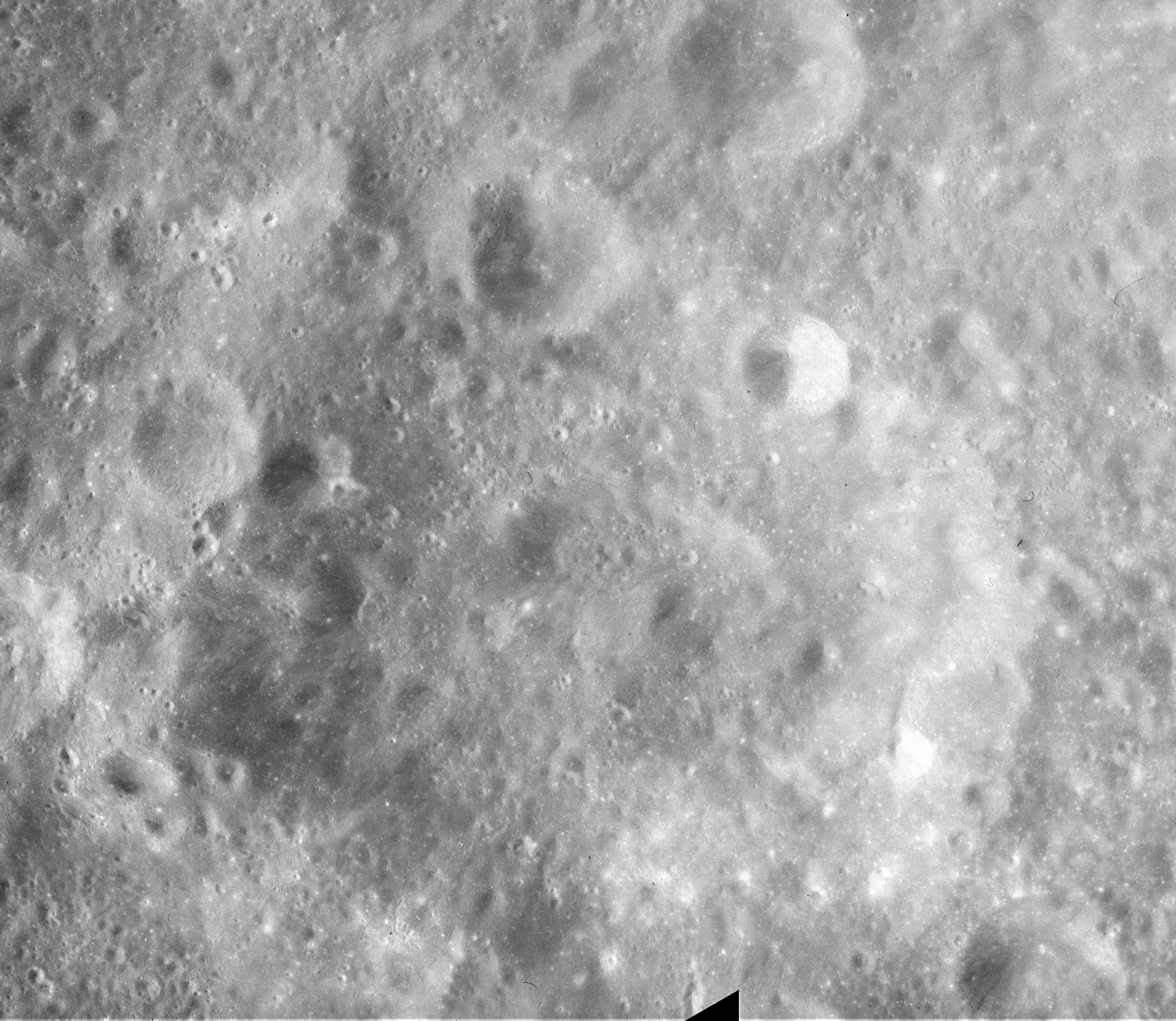
- Apollo 16 Mapping Camera image
- Coordinates: 2.2°N 127.2°E
- Diameter: 64 km
- Colongitude: 234° at sunrise
- Eponym: James Gregory

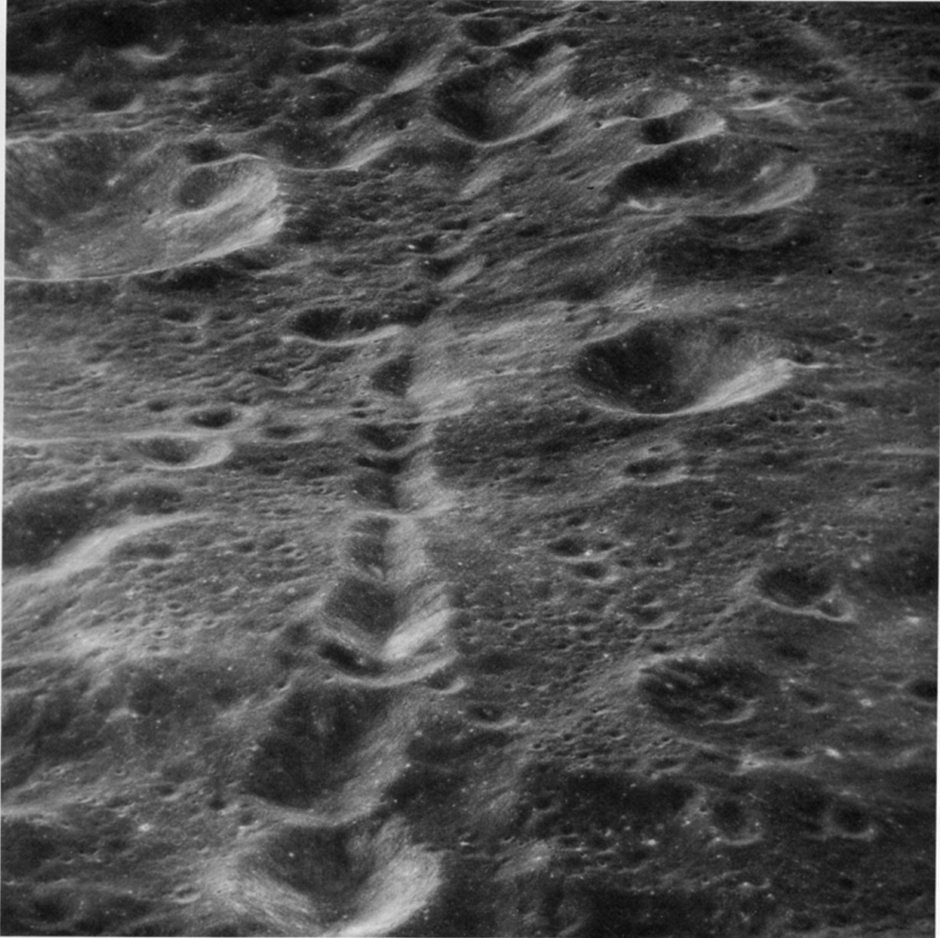
Oblique view of Catena Gregory, facing northwest, from Apollo 17

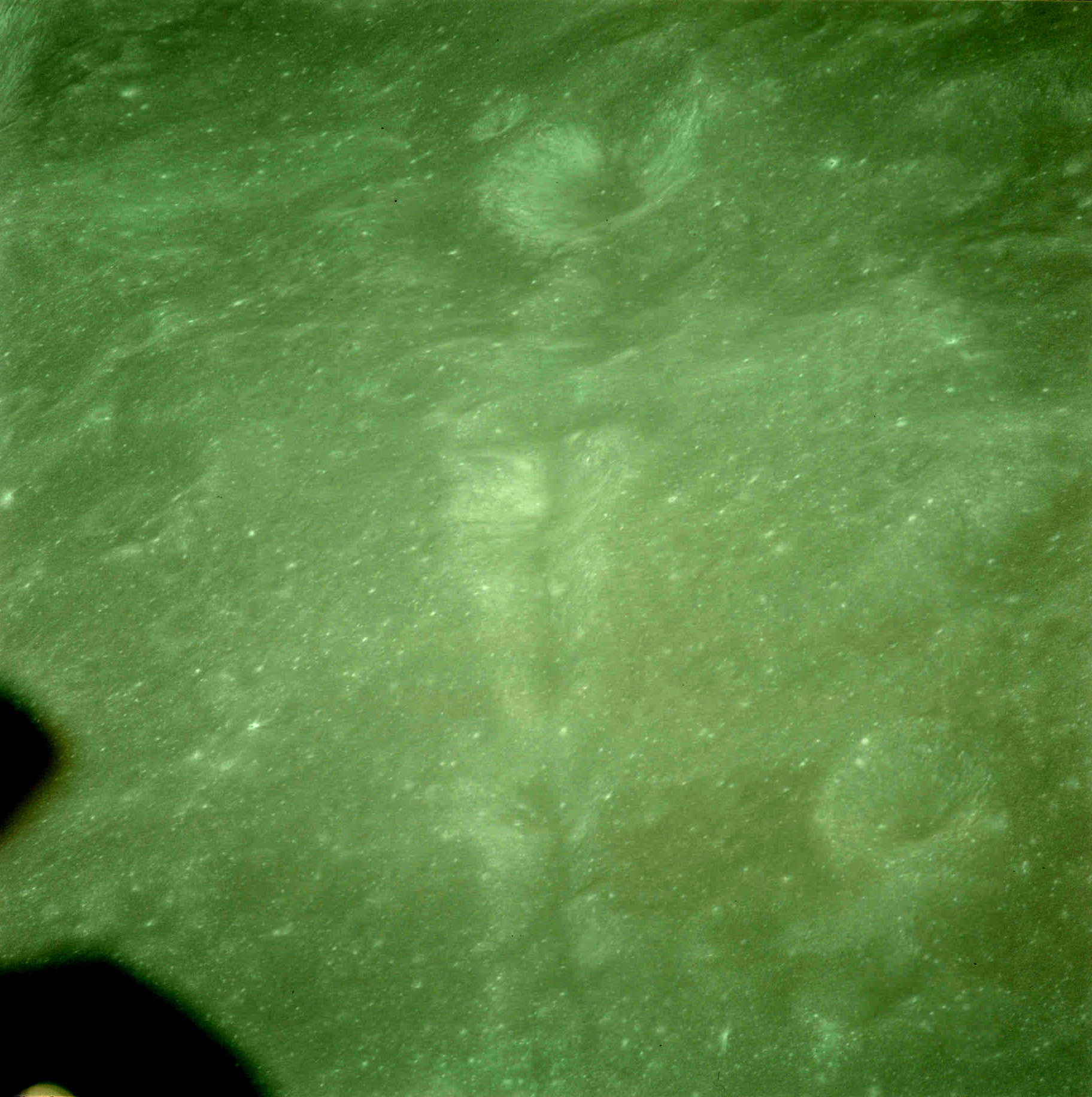
Another oblique view, facing southeast, from Apollo 10

Gregory is a lunar impact crater on the far side of the Moon. It is located to the southeast of the crater Ibn Firnas, and north-northeast of Bečvář. About one crater diameter to the north is the smaller Morozov.

This is a worn and eroded crater formation. It includes a 11-km long lobate scarp. The northern rim is degraded due to impacts. Attached to the exterior of the southwest is Gregory Q, a satellite crater about the same size as Gregory. Within the interior is the remains of a small crater rim along the northwestern inner wall. To the east of Gregory and leading away to the southeast is a crater chain designated Catena Gregory.

The crater was named after 17th century Scottish astronomer and mathematician James Gregory by the IAU in 1970. While Gregory itself was unnumbered, its satellite crater Gregory Q was known as Crater 282 prior to naming in 2006.

== Satellite craters ==
By convention these features are identified on lunar maps by placing the letter on the side of the crater midpoint that is closest to Gregory.

Gregory	Latitude	Longitude	Diameter
K	0.4° S	128.5° E	26 km
Q	0.6° N	125.7° E	68 km
