= Geology of solar terrestrial planets =

Geology of Mercury, Venus, Earth, Mars and Ceres

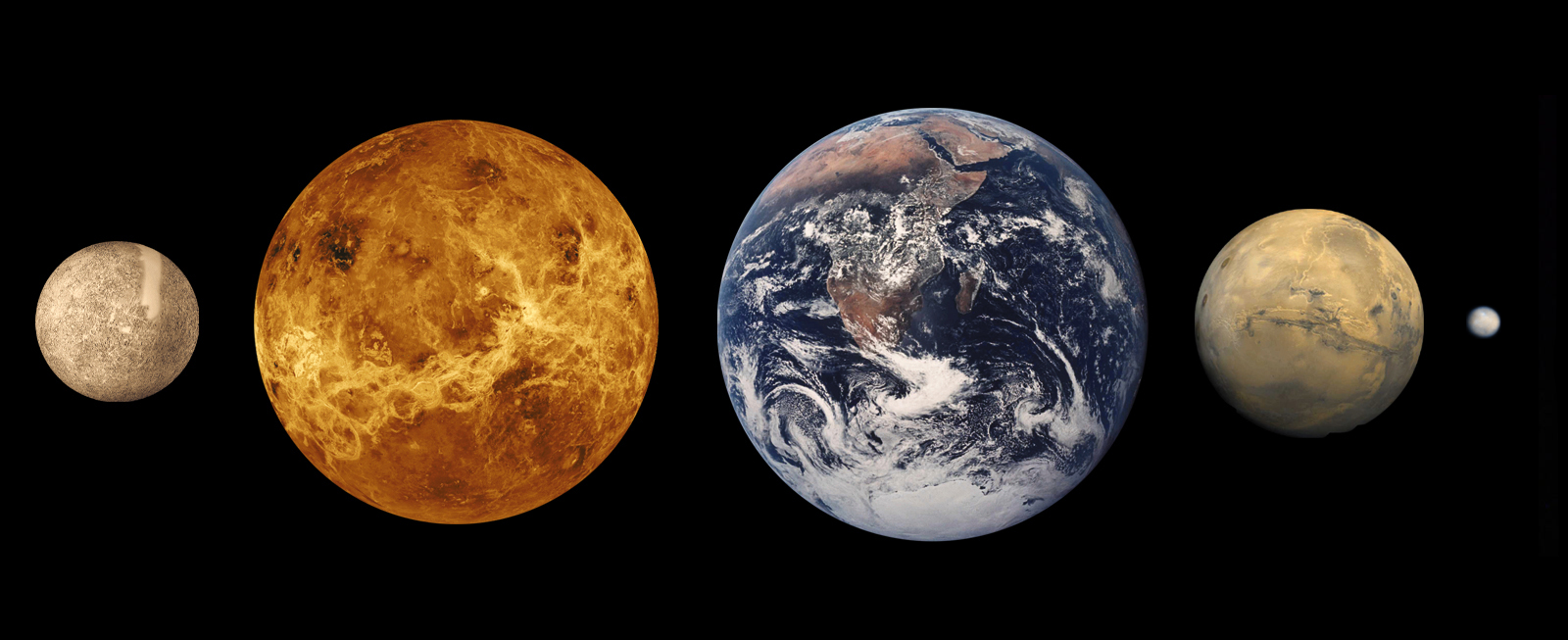
The inner planets. From left to right: Mercury, Venus, Earth, Mars and terrestrial dwarf planet, Ceres (sizes to scale)

The geology of solar terrestrial planets mainly deals with the geological aspects of the four terrestrial planets of the Solar System – Mercury, Venus, Earth, and Mars – and one terrestrial dwarf planet: Ceres. Earth is the only terrestrial planet known to have an active hydrosphere.

Terrestrial planets are substantially different from the giant planets, which might not have solid surfaces and are composed mostly of some combination of hydrogen, helium, and water existing in various physical states. Terrestrial planets have a compact, rocky surfaces, and Venus, Earth, and Mars each also has an atmosphere. Their size, radius, and density are all similar.

Terrestrial planets have numerous similarities to dwarf planets (objects like Pluto), which also have a solid surface, but are primarily composed of icy materials. During the formation of the Solar System, there were probably many more (planetesimals), but they have all merged with or been destroyed by the four remaining worlds in the solar nebula.

The terrestrial planets all have roughly the same structure: a central metallic core, mostly iron, with a surrounding silicate mantle. The Moon is similar, but lacks a substantial iron core. Three of the four solar terrestrial planets (Venus, Earth, and Mars) have substantial atmospheres; all have impact craters and tectonic surface features such as rift valleys and volcanoes.

The term inner planet should not be confused with inferior planet, which refers to any planet that is closer to the Sun than the observer's planet is, but usually refers to Mercury and Venus.

== Formation of solar planets ==
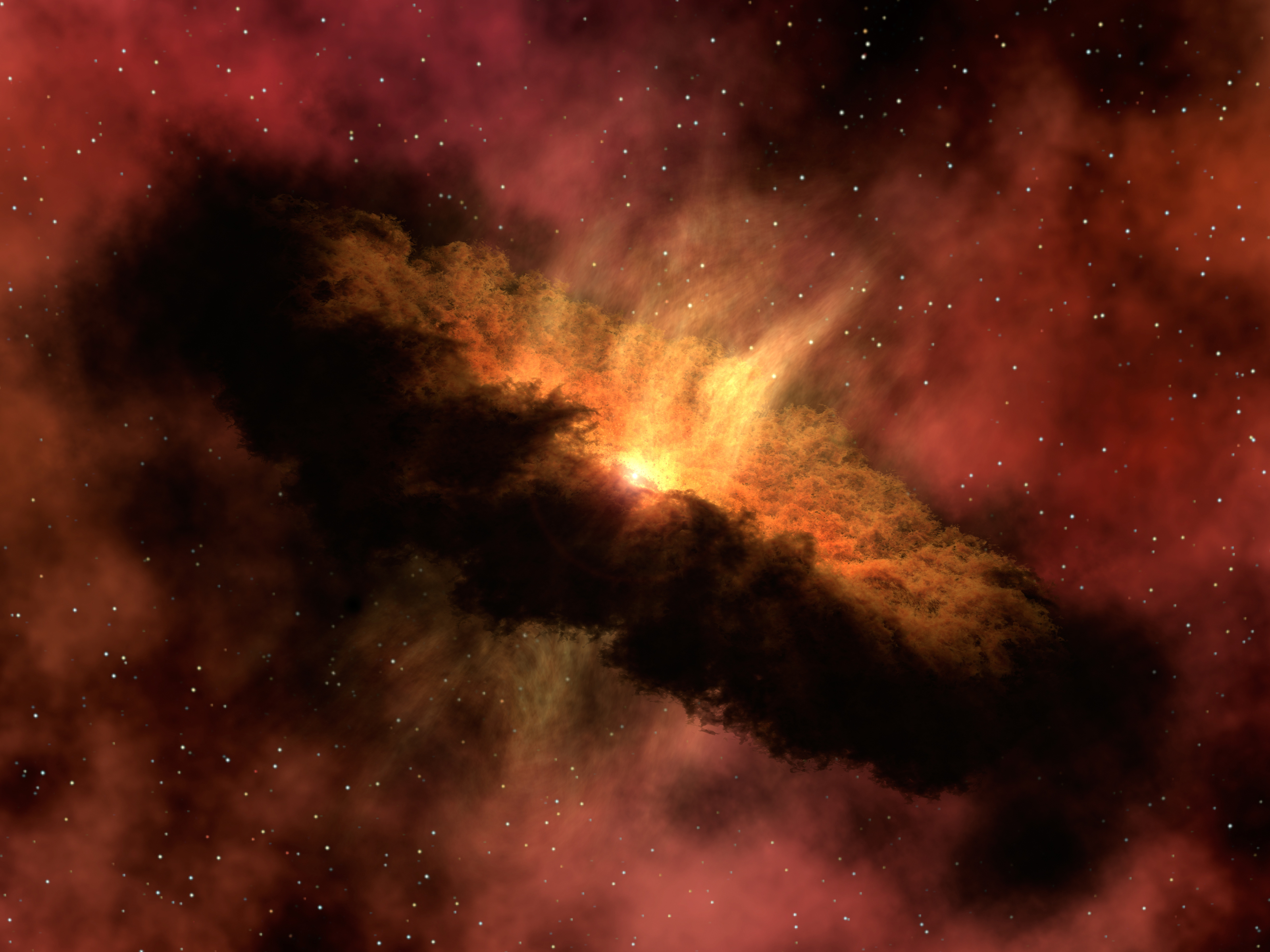
Artist's conception of a protoplanetary disk

The Solar System is believed to have formed according to the nebular hypothesis, first proposed in 1755 by Immanuel Kant and independently formulated by Pierre-Simon Laplace. This theory holds that 4.6 billion years ago the Solar System formed from the gravitational collapse of a giant molecular cloud. This initial cloud was likely several light-years across and probably birthed several stars.

The first solid particles were microscopic in size. These particles orbited the Sun in nearly circular orbits right next to each other, as the gas from which they condensed. Gradually, gentle collisions allowed the flakes to stick together and make larger particles which, in turn, attracted more solid particles towards them. This process is known as accretion. The objects formed by accretion are called planetesimals—they act as seeds for planet formation. Initially, planetesimals were closely packed. They coalesced into larger objects, forming clumps up to a few kilometers across in a few million years, a small time in comparison to the age of the Solar System. After the planetesimals grew bigger in sizes, collisions became highly destructive, making further growth more difficult. Only the biggest planetesimals survived the fragmentation process and continued to slowly grow into protoplanets by accretion of planetesimals of similar composition. After the protoplanet formed, accumulation of heat from radioactive decay of short-lived elements melted the planet, allowing materials to differentiate (i.e. to separate according to their density).

=== Terrestrial planets ===
In the warmer inner Solar System, planetesimals formed from rocks and metals cooked billions of years ago in the cores of massive stars. These elements constituted only 0.6% of the material in the solar nebula. That is why the terrestrial planets could not grow very large and could not exert a strong pull on hydrogen and helium gas. Also, the faster collisions among particles close to the Sun were more destructive on average. Even if the terrestrial planets had had hydrogen and helium, the Sun would have heated the gases and caused them to escape. Hence, solar terrestrial planets such as Mercury, Venus, Earth, and Mars are dense, small planets composed mostly from 2% of heavier elements contained in the solar nebula.

== Surface geology of inner solar planets ==
The four inner or terrestrial planets have dense, rocky compositions, few or no moons, and no ring systems. They are composed largely of minerals with high melting points, such as the silicates which form their solid crusts and semi-liquid mantles, and metals such as iron and nickel, which form their cores.

=== Mercury ===
The Mariner 10 mission (1974) mapped about half the surface of Mercury. On the basis of that data, scientists have a first-order understanding of the geology and history of the planet. Mercury's surface shows intercrater plains, basins, smooth plains, craters, and tectonic features.

Mercury's oldest surface is its intercrater plains, which are present (but much less extensive) on the Moon. The intercrater plains are level to gently rolling terrain that occur between and around large craters. The plains predate the heavily cratered terrain, and have obliterated many of the early craters and basins of Mercury; they probably formed by widespread volcanism early in Mercurian history.

Mercurian craters have the morphological elements of lunar craters—the smaller craters are bowl-shaped, and with increasing size they develop scalloped rims, central peaks, and terraces on the inner walls. The ejecta sheets have a hilly, lineated texture and swarms of secondary impact craters. Fresh craters of all sizes have dark or bright halos and well-developed ray systems. Although Mercurian and lunar craters are superficially similar, they show subtle differences, especially in deposit extent. The continuous ejecta and fields of secondary craters on Mercury are far less extensive (by a factor of about 0.65) for a given rim diameter than those of comparable lunar craters. This difference results from the 2.5 times higher gravitational field on Mercury compared with the Moon. As on the Moon, impact craters on Mercury are progressively degraded by subsequent impacts. The freshest craters have ray systems and a crisp morphology. With further degradation, the craters lose their crisp morphology and rays and features on the continuous ejecta become more blurred until only the raised rim near the crater remains recognizable. Because craters become progressively degraded with time, the degree of degradation gives a rough indication of the crater's relative age. On the assumption that craters of similar size and morphology are roughly the same age, it is possible to place constraints on the ages of other underlying or overlying units and thus to globally map the relative age of craters.

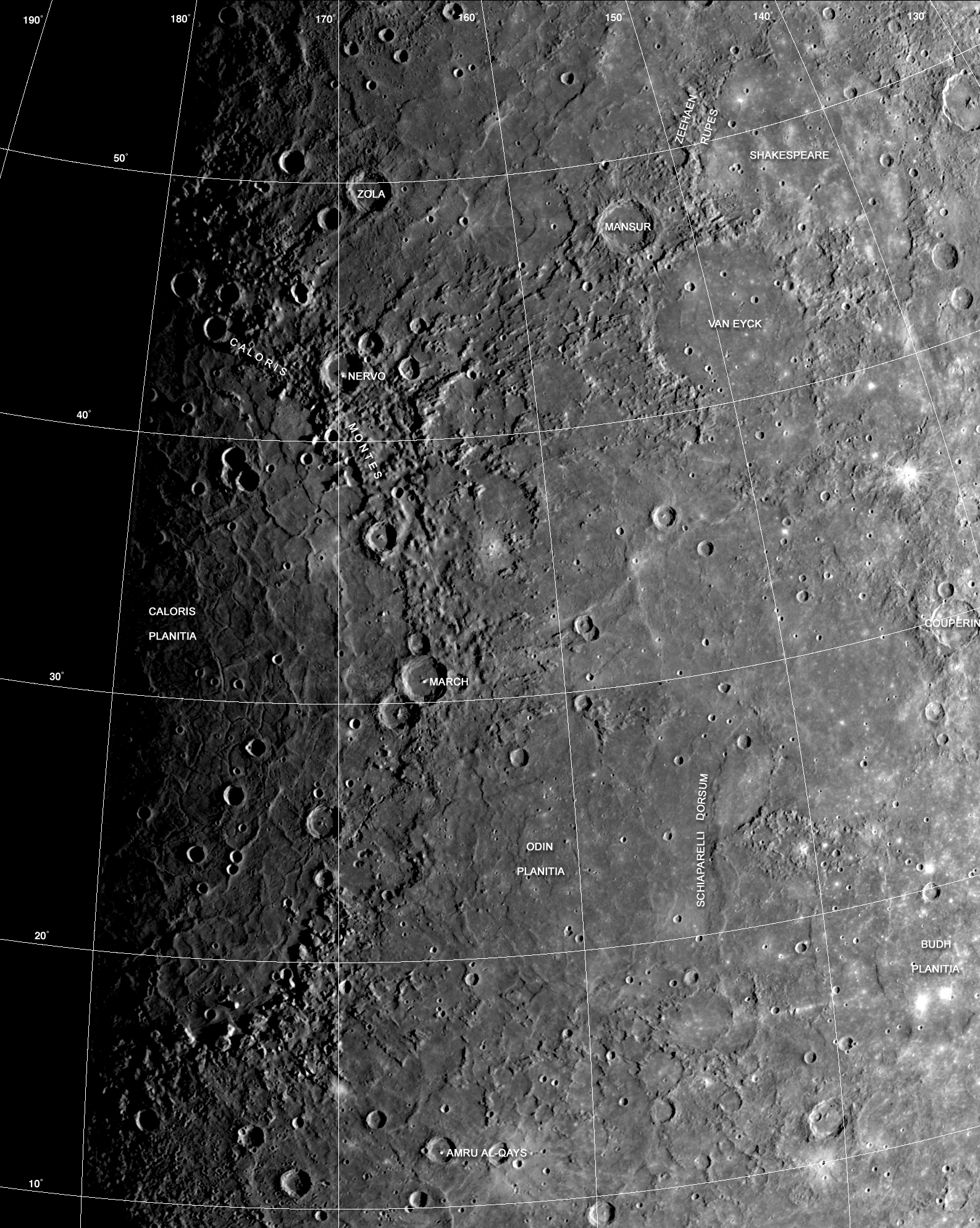
Mercury's Caloris Basin is one of the largest impact features in the Solar System.

At least 15 ancient basins have been identified on Mercury. Tolstoj is a true multi-ring basin, displaying at least two, and possibly as many as four, concentric rings. It has a well-preserved ejecta blanket extending outward as much as 500 kilometres (311 mi) from its rim. The basin interior is flooded with plains that clearly postdate the ejecta deposits. Beethoven has only one, subdued massif-like rim 625 kilometres (388 mi) in diameter, but displays an impressive, well lineated ejecta blanket that extends as far as 500 kilometres (311 mi). As at Tolstoj, Beethoven ejecta is asymmetric. The Caloris basin is defined by a ring of mountains 1,300 kilometres (808 mi) in diameter. Individual massifs are typically 30 kilometres (19 mi) to 50 kilometres (31 mi) long; the inner edge of the unit is marked by basin-facing scarps. Lineated terrain extends for about 1,000 kilometres (621 mi) out from the foot of a weak discontinuous scarp on the outer edge of the Caloris mountains; this terrain is similar to the sculpture surrounding the Imbrium basin on the Moon. Hummocky material forms a broad annulus about 800 kilometres (497 mi) from the Caloris mountains. It consists of low, closely spaced to scattered hills about 0.3 to 1 kilometre (1 mi) across and from tens of meters to a few hundred meters high. The outer boundary of this unit is gradational with the (younger) smooth plains that occur in the same region. A hilly and furrowed terrain is found antipodal to the Caloris basin, probably created by antipodal convergence of intense seismic waves generated by the Caloris impact.

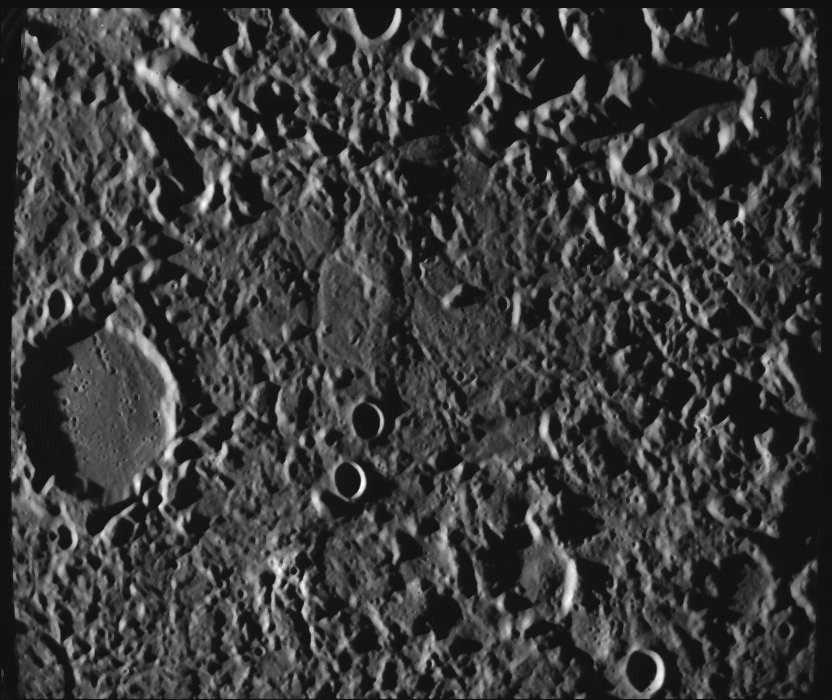
The so-called “Weird Terrain” was formed by the Caloris Basin impact at its antipodal point.

The floor of the Caloris basin is deformed by sinuous ridges and fractures, giving the basin fill a grossly polygonal pattern. These plains may be volcanic, formed by the release of magma as part of the impact event, or a thick sheet of impact melt. Widespread areas of Mercury are covered by relatively flat, sparsely cratered plains materials. They fill depressions that range in size from regional troughs to crater floors. The smooth plains are similar to the maria of the Moon, an obvious difference being that the smooth plains have the same albedo as the intercrater plains. Smooth plains are most strikingly exposed in a broad annulus around the Caloris basin. No unequivocal volcanic features, such as flow lobes, leveed channels, domes, or cones are visible. Crater densities indicate that the smooth plains are significantly younger than ejecta from the Caloris basin. In addition, distinct color units, some of lobate shape, are observed in newly processed color data. Such relations strongly support a volcanic origin for the mercurian smooth plains, even in the absence of diagnostic landforms.

Lobate scarps are widely distributed over Mercury and consist of sinuous to arcuate scarps that transect preexisting plains and craters. They are most convincingly interpreted as thrust faults, indicating a period of global compression. The lobate scarps typically transect smooth plains materials (early Calorian age) on the floors of craters, but post-Caloris craters are superposed on them. These observations suggest that lobate-scarp formation was confined to a relatively narrow interval of time, beginning in the late pre-Tolstojan period and ending in the middle to late Calorian Period. In addition to scarps, wrinkle ridges occur in the smooth plains materials. These ridges probably were formed by local to regional surface compression caused by lithospheric loading by dense stacks of volcanic lavas, as suggested for those of the lunar maria.

=== Venus ===
The surface of Venus is comparatively very flat. When 93% of the topography was mapped by Pioneer Venus, scientists found that the total distance from the lowest point to the highest point on the entire surface was about 13 kilometres (8 mi), while on the Earth the distance from the basins to the Himalayas is about 20 kilometres (12.4 mi). According to the data of the altimeters of the Pioneer, nearly 51% of the surface is found located within 500 metres (1,640 ft) of the median radius of 6,052 km (3760 mi); only 2% of the surface is located at greater elevations than 2 kilometres (1 mi) from the median radius.

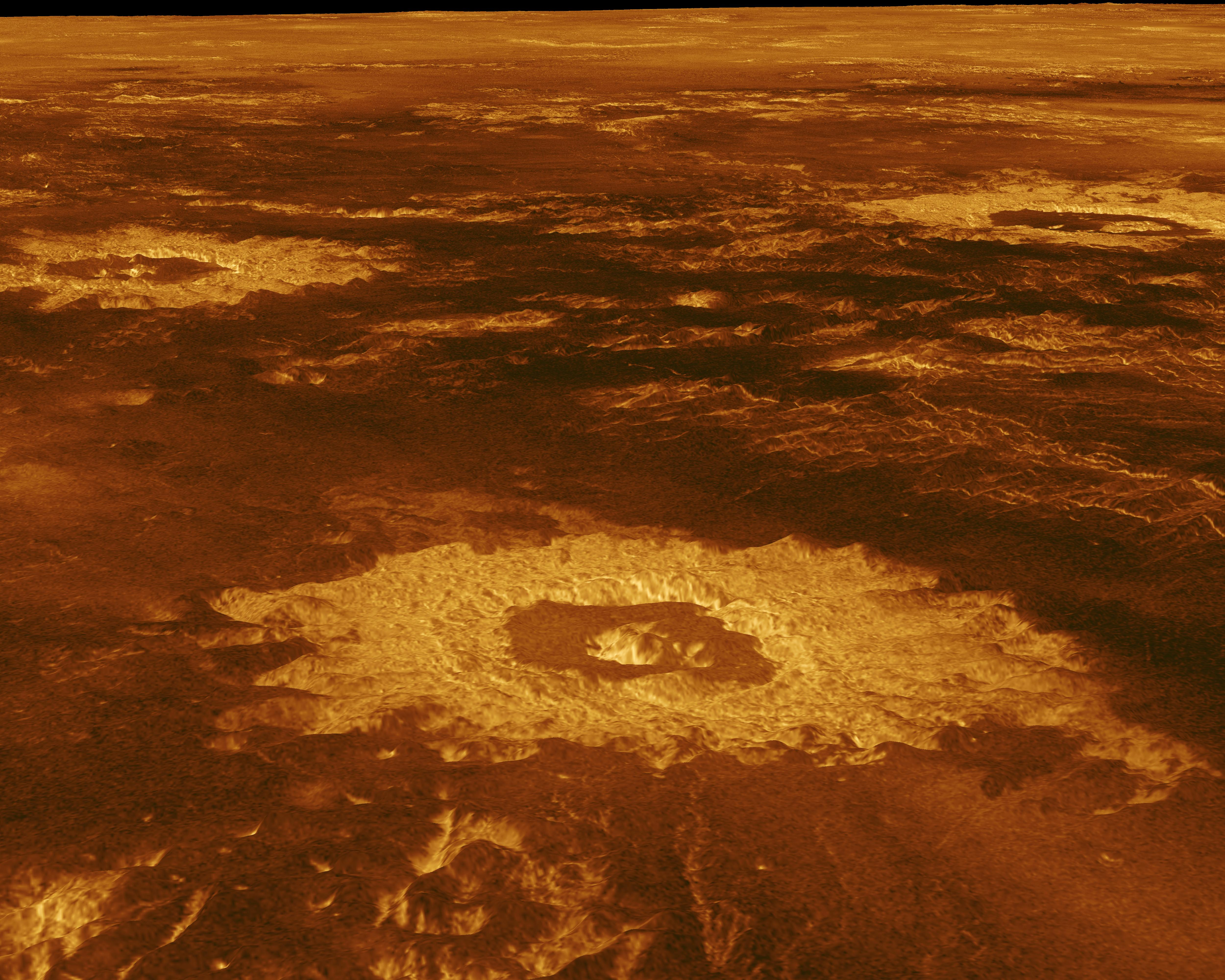
Danilova crater in relief

Venus shows no evidence of active plate tectonics. There is debatable evidence of active tectonics in the planet's distant past; however, events taking place since then (such as the plausible and generally accepted hypothesis that the Venusian lithosphere has thickened greatly over the course of several hundred million years) has made constraining the course of its geologic record difficult. However, the numerous well-preserved impact craters have been utilized as a dating method to approximately date the Venusian surface (since there are thus far no known samples of Venusian rock to be dated by more reliable methods). Dates derived are primarily in the range ~500 Mya–750Mya, although ages of up to ~1.2 Gya have been calculated. This research has led to the fairly well accepted hypothesis that Venus has undergone an essentially complete volcanic resurfacing at least once in its distant past, with the last event taking place approximately within the range of estimated surface ages. While the mechanism of such an impressionable thermal event remains a debated issue in Venusian geosciences, some scientists are advocates of processes involving plate motion to some extent. There are almost 1,000 impact craters on Venus, more or less evenly distributed across its surface.

Earth-based radar surveys made it possible to identify some topographic patterns related to craters, and the Venera 15 and Venera 16 probes identified almost 150 such features of probable impact origin. Global coverage from Magellan subsequently made it possible to identify nearly 900 impact craters.

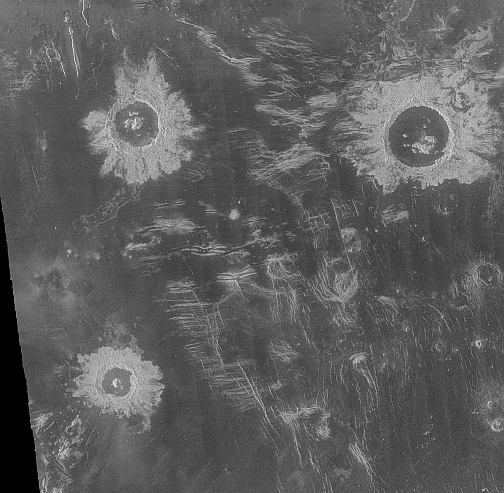
Danilova, Aglaonice and Saskja craters

Crater counts give an important estimate for the age of the surface of a planet. Over time, bodies in the Solar System are randomly impacted, so the more craters a surface has, the older it is. Compared to Mercury, the Moon and other such bodies, Venus has very few craters. In part, this is because Venus's dense atmosphere burns up smaller meteorites before they hit the surface. The Venera and Magellan data agree: there are very few impact craters with a diameter less than 30 kilometres (19 mi), and data from Magellan show an absence of any craters less than 2 kilometres (1 mi) in diameter. However, there are also fewer of the large craters, and those appear relatively young; they are rarely filled with lava, showing that they happened after volcanic activity in the area, and radar shows that they are rough and have not had time to be eroded down.

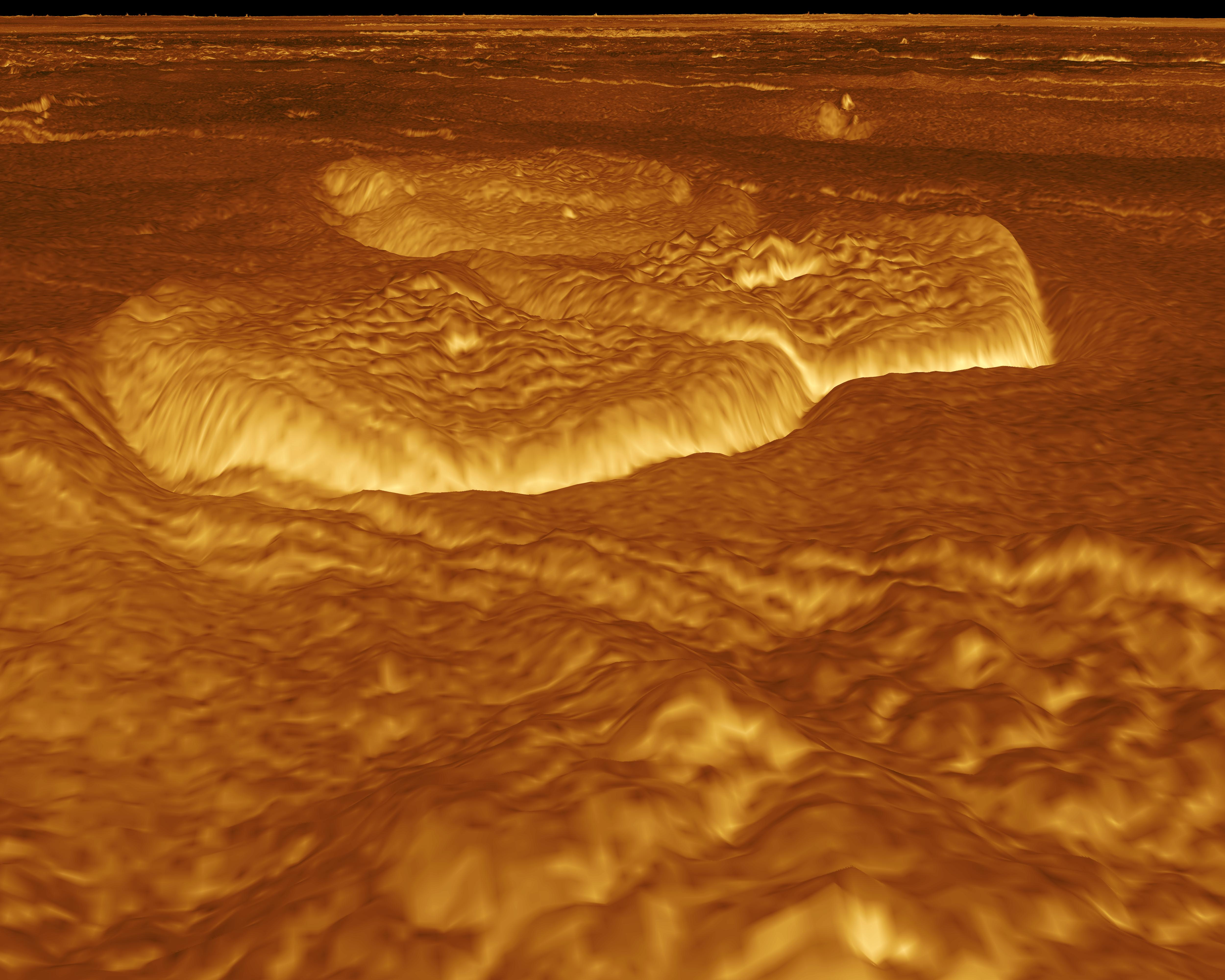
Computer generated perspective view of pancake domes in Venus's Alpha Regio

Much of Venus' surface appears to have been shaped by volcanic activity. Overall, Venus has several times as many volcanoes as Earth, and it possesses some 167 giant volcanoes that are over 100 kilometres (62 mi) across. The only volcanic complex of this size on Earth is the Big Island of Hawaii. However, this is not because Venus is more volcanically active than Earth, but because its crust is older. Earth's crust is continually recycled by subduction at the boundaries of tectonic plates, and has an average age of about 100 million years, while Venus' surface is estimated to be about 500 million years old. Venusian craters range from 3 kilometres (2 mi) to 280 kilometres (174 mi) in diameter. There are no craters smaller than 3 km, because of the effects of the dense atmosphere on incoming objects. Objects with less than a certain kinetic energy are slowed down so much by the atmosphere that they do not create an impact crater.

=== Earth ===
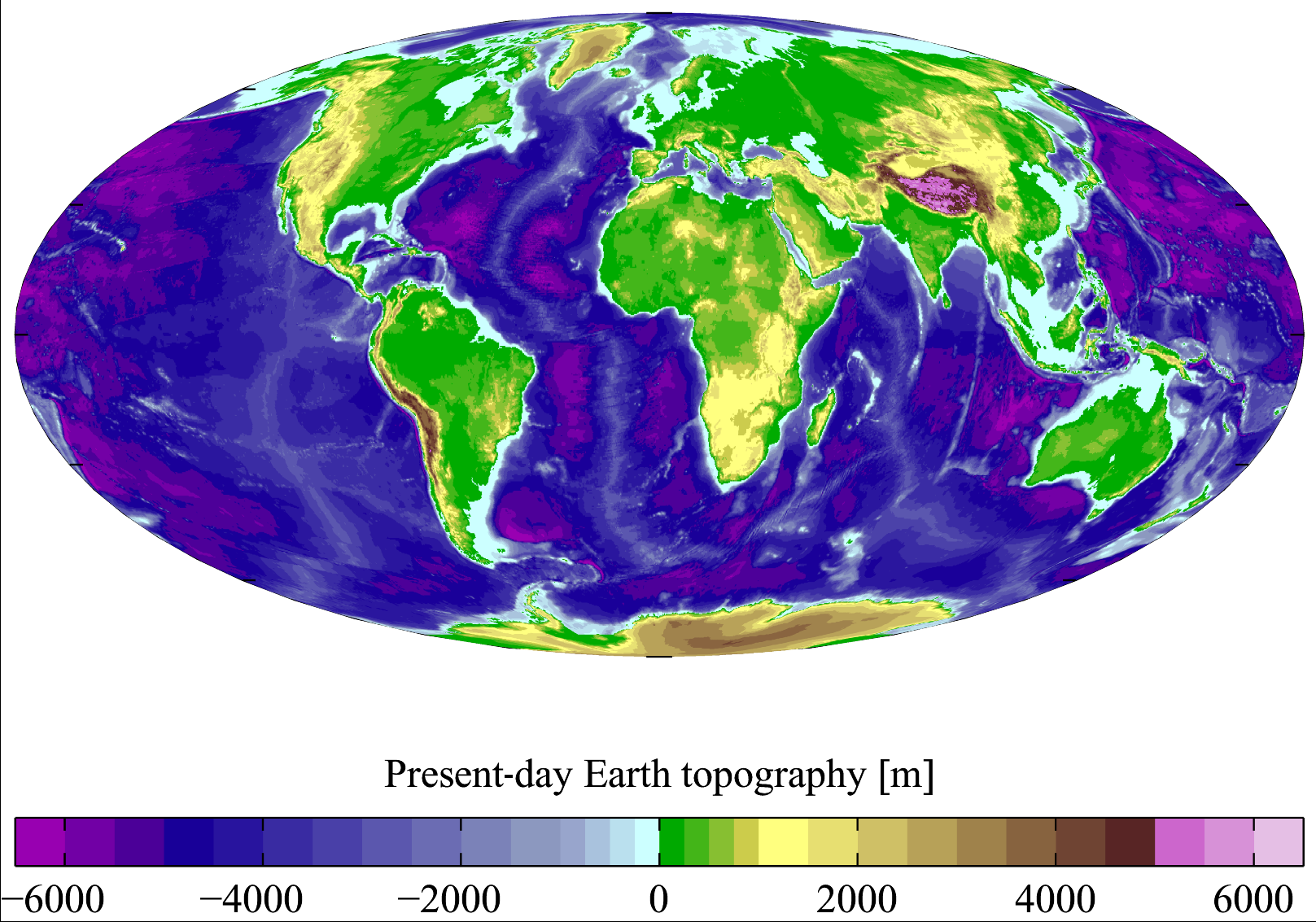
Present day Earth altimetry and bathymetry. Data from the National Geophysical Data Center's TerrainBase Digital Terrain Model.

The Earth's terrain varies greatly from place to place. About 70.8% of the surface is covered by water. The sea floor has mountainous features, including a globe-spanning mid-ocean ridge system, as well as undersea volcanoes, oceanic trenches, submarine canyons, oceanic plateaus, and abyssal plains. The remaining 29.2% not covered by water consists of mountains, deserts, plains, plateaus, and other geomorphologies.

The planetary surface undergoes reshaping over geological time periods due to the effects of tectonics and erosion. Surface features built up or deformed through plate tectonics are subject to steady weathering from precipitation, thermal cycles, and chemical effects. Glaciation, coastal erosion, the build-up of coral reefs, and large meteorite impacts also act to reshape the landscape.

As the continental plates migrate across the planet, the ocean floor is subducted under the leading edges. At the same time, upwellings of mantle material create a divergent boundary along mid-ocean ridges. The combination of these processes continually recycles the ocean plate material. Most of the ocean floor is less than 100 million years in age. The oldest ocean plate is located in the Western Pacific, and has an estimated age of about 200 million years. By comparison, the oldest fossils found on land have an age of about 3 billion years.

The continental plates consist of lower density material such as the igneous rocks granite and andesite. Less common is basalt, a denser volcanic rock that is the primary constituent of the ocean floors. Sedimentary rock is formed from the accumulation of sediment that becomes compacted together. Nearly 75% of the continental surfaces are covered by sedimentary rocks, although they form only about 5% of the crust. The third form of rock material found on Earth is metamorphic rock, which is created from the transformation of pre-existing rock types through high pressures, high temperatures, or both. The most abundant silicate minerals on the Earth's surface include quartz, the feldspars, amphibole, mica, pyroxene, and olivine. Common carbonate minerals include calcite (found in limestone), aragonite, and dolomite.

Elevation histogram of the surface of the Earth—approximately 71% of the Earth's surface is covered with water.

The pedosphere is the outermost layer of the Earth that is composed of soil and subject to soil formation processes. It exists at the interface of the lithosphere, atmosphere, hydrosphere, and biosphere. Currently the total arable land is 13.31% of the land surface, with only 4.71% supporting permanent crops. Close to 40% of the Earth's land surface is presently used for cropland and pasture, or an estimated 13 million square kilometres (5.0 million square miles) of cropland and 34 million square kilometres (13 million square miles) of pastureland.

The physical features of land are remarkably varied. The largest mountain ranges—the Himalayas in Asia and the Andes in South America—extend for thousands of kilometres. The longest rivers are the river Nile in Africa (6,695 kilometres or 4,160 miles) and the Amazon river in South America (6,437 kilometres or 4,000 miles). Deserts cover about 20% of the total land area. The largest is the Sahara, which covers nearly one-third of Africa.

The elevation of the land surface of the Earth varies from the low point of −418 m (−1,371 ft) at the Dead Sea, to a 2005-estimated maximum altitude of 8,848 m (29,028 ft) at the top of Mount Everest. The mean height of land above sea level is 686 m (2,250 ft).

The geological history of Earth can be broadly classified into two periods namely:

- Precambrian: extends for approximately 90% of geologic time, from 4.6 billion years ago to the beginning of the Cambrian Period (539 Ma). It is generally believed that small proto-continents existed prior to 3000 Ma, and that most of the Earth's landmasses collected into a single supercontinent around 1000 Ma.
- Phanerozoic: the current eon in the geologic timescale. It covers 539 million years. During this time, continents drifted about, eventually collected into a single landmass known as Pangea and then split up into the current continental landmasses.

=== Mars ===
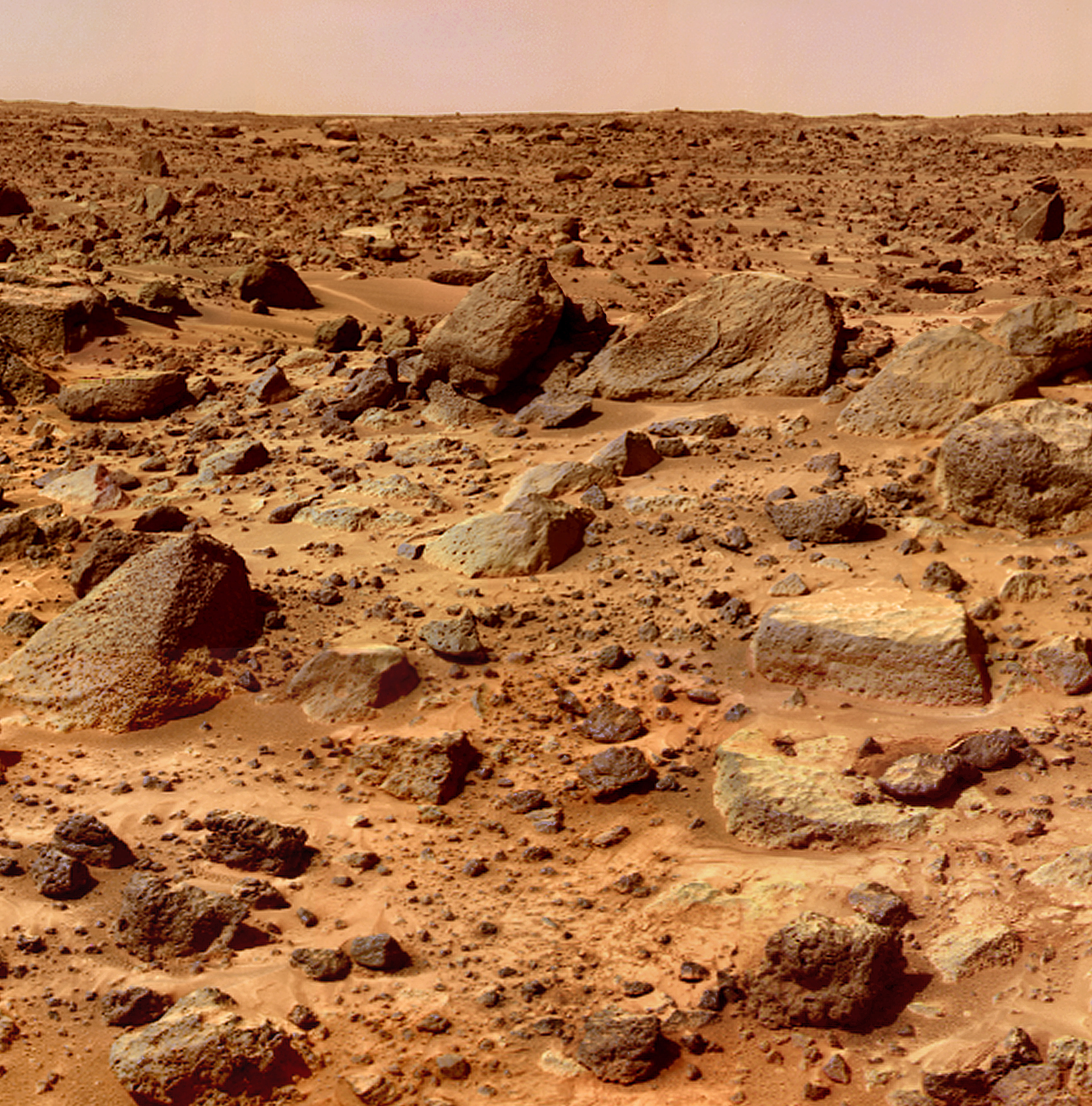
Rock strewn surface imaged by Mars Pathfinder

The surface of Mars is thought to be primarily composed of basalt, based upon the observed lava flows from volcanos, the Martian meteorite collection, and data from landers and orbital observations. The lava flows from Martian volcanos show that lava has a very low viscosity, typical of basalt. Analysis of the soil samples collected by the Viking landers in 1976 indicate iron-rich clays consistent with weathering of basaltic rocks. There is some evidence that some portion of the Martian surface might be more silica-rich than typical basalt, perhaps similar to andesitic rocks on Earth, though these observations may also be explained by silica glass, phyllosilicates, or opal. Much of the surface is deeply covered by dust as fine as talcum powder. The red/orange appearance of Mars' surface is caused by iron(III) oxide (rust). Mars has twice as much iron oxide in its outer layer as Earth does, despite their supposed similar origin. It is thought that Earth, being hotter, transported much of the iron downwards in the 1,800 kilometres (1,118 mi) deep, 3,200 °C (5,792 °F), lava seas of the early planet, while Mars, with a lower lava temperature of 2,200 °C (3,992 °F) was too cool for this to happen.

The core is surrounded by a silicate mantle that formed many of the tectonic and volcanic features on the planet. The average thickness of the planet's crust is about 50 km, and it is no thicker than 125 kilometres (78 mi), which is much thicker than Earth's crust which varies between 5 kilometres (3 mi) and 70 kilometres (43 mi). As a result, Mars' crust does not easily deform, as was shown by the recent radar map of the south polar ice cap which does not deform the crust despite being about 3 km thick.

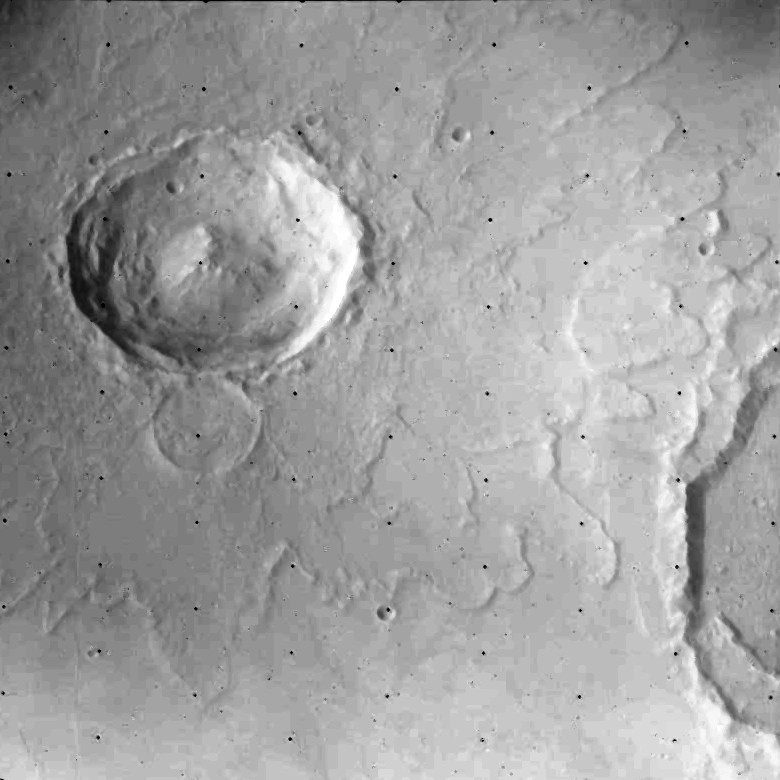
Yuty impact crater with typical rampart ejecta

Crater morphology provides information about the physical structure and composition of the surface. Impact craters allow us to look deep below the surface and into Mars geological past. Lobate ejecta blankets (pictured left) and central pit craters are common on Mars but uncommon on the Moon, which may indicate the presence of near-surface volatiles (ice and water) on Mars. Degraded impact structures record variations in volcanic, fluvial, and aeolian activity.

The Yuty crater is an example of a Rampart crater so called because of the rampart like edge of the ejecta. In the Yuty crater the ejecta completely covers an older crater at its side, showing that the ejected material is just a thin layer.

The geological history of Mars can be broadly classified into many epochs, but the following are the three major ones:

- Noachian epoch (named after Noachis Terra): Formation of the oldest extant surfaces of Mars, 3.8 billion years ago to 3.5 billion years ago. Noachian age surfaces are scarred by many large impact craters. The Tharsis bulge volcanic upland is thought to have formed during this period, with extensive flooding by liquid water late in the epoch.
- Hesperian epoch (named after Hesperia Planum): 3.5 billion years ago to 1.8 billion years ago. The Hesperian epoch is marked by the formation of extensive lava plains.
- Amazonian epoch (named after Amazonis Planitia): 1.8 billion years ago to present. Amazonian regions have few meteorite impact craters but are otherwise quite varied. Olympus Mons, the largest volcano in the known Universe, formed during this period along with lava flows elsewhere on Mars.

=== Ceres ===
The geology of the dwarf planet, Ceres, was largely unknown until Dawn spacecraft explored it in early 2015. However, certain surface features such as "Piazzi", named after the dwarf planets' discoverer, had been resolved.[a] Ceres's oblateness is consistent with a differentiated body, a rocky core overlain with an icy mantle. This 100-kilometer-thick mantle (23%–28% of Ceres by mass; 50% by volume) contains 200 million cubic kilometers of water, which is more than the amount of fresh water on Earth. This result is supported by the observations made by the Keck telescope in 2002 and by evolutionary modeling. Also, some characteristics of its surface and history (such as its distance from the Sun, which weakened solar radiation enough to allow some fairly low-freezing-point components to be incorporated during its formation), point to the presence of volatile materials in the interior of Ceres. It has been suggested that a remnant layer of liquid water may have survived to the present under a layer of ice. The surface composition of Ceres is broadly similar to that of C-type asteroids. Some differences do exist. The ubiquitous features of the Cererian IR spectra are those of hydrated materials, which indicate the presence of significant amounts of water in the interior. Other possible surface constituents include iron-rich clay minerals (cronstedtite) and carbonate minerals (dolomite and siderite), which are common minerals in carbonaceous chondrite meteorites. The spectral features of carbonates and clay minerals are usually absent in the spectra of other C-type asteroids. Sometimes Ceres is classified as a G-type asteroid.

The Cererian surface is relatively warm. The maximum temperature with the Sun overhead was estimated from measurements to be 235 K (about −38 °C, −36 °F) on 5 May 1991.

Prior to the Dawn mission, only a few Cererian surface features had been unambiguously detected. High-resolution ultraviolet Hubble Space Telescope images taken in 1995 showed a dark spot on its surface, which was nicknamed "Piazzi" in honor of the discoverer of Ceres. This was thought to be a crater. Later near-infrared images with a higher resolution taken over a whole rotation with the Keck telescope using adaptive optics showed several bright and dark features moving with Ceres's rotation. Two dark features had circular shapes and are presumably craters; one of them was observed to have a bright central region, whereas another was identified as the "Piazzi" feature. More recent visible-light Hubble Space Telescope images of a full rotation taken in 2003 and 2004 showed 11 recognizable surface features, the natures of which are currently unknown. One of these features corresponds to the "Piazzi" feature observed earlier.

These last observations also determined that the north pole of Ceres points in the direction of right ascension 19 h 24 min (291°), declination +59°, in the constellation Draco. This means that Ceres's axial tilt is very small—about 3°.

==== Atmosphere ====
There are indications that Ceres may have a tenuous atmosphere and water frost on the surface. Surface water ice is unstable at distances less than 5 AU from the Sun, so it is expected to vaporize if it is exposed directly to solar radiation. Water ice can migrate from the deep layers of Ceres to the surface, but escapes in a very short time. As a result, it is difficult to detect water vaporization. Water escaping from polar regions of Ceres was possibly observed in the early 1990s but this has not been unambiguously demonstrated. It may be possible to detect escaping water from the surroundings of a fresh impact crater or from cracks in the subsurface layers of Ceres. Ultraviolet observations by the IUE spacecraft detected statistically significant amounts of hydroxide ions near the Cererean north pole, which is a product of water-vapor dissociation by ultraviolet solar radiation.

In early 2014, using data from the Herschel Space Observatory, it was discovered that there are several localized (not more than 60 km in diameter) mid-latitude sources of water vapor on Ceres, which each give off about 10^{26} molecules (or 3 kg) of water per second. Two potential source regions, designated Piazzi (123°E, 21°N) and Region A (231°E, 23°N), have been visualized in the near infrared as dark areas (Region A also has a bright center) by the W. M. Keck Observatory. Possible mechanisms for the vapor release are sublimation from about 0.6 km2 of exposed surface ice, or cryovolcanic eruptions resulting from radiogenic internal heat or from pressurization of a subsurface ocean due to growth of an overlying layer of ice. Surface sublimation would be expected to decline as Ceres recedes from the Sun in its eccentric orbit, whereas internally powered emissions should not be affected by orbital position. The limited data available are more consistent with cometary-style sublimation. The spacecraft Dawn is approaching Ceres at aphelion, which may constrain Dawn's ability to observe this phenomenon.

Note: This info was taken directly from the main article, sources for the material are included there.

== Small Solar System bodies ==
Asteroids, comets, and meteoroids are all debris remaining from the nebula in which the Solar System formed 4.6 billion years ago.

=== Asteroid belt ===
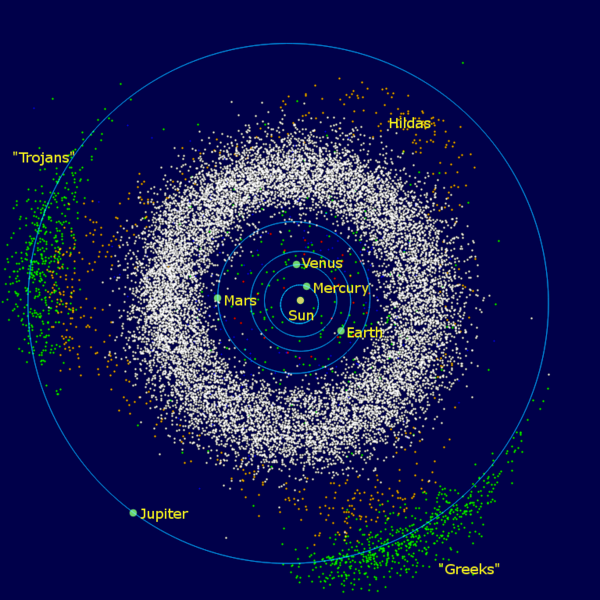
Image of the main asteroid belt and the Trojan asteroids

The asteroid belt is located between Mars and Jupiter. It is made of thousands of rocky planetesimals from 1,000 kilometres (621 mi) to a few meters across. These are thought to be debris of the formation of the Solar System that could not form a planet due to Jupiter's gravity. When asteroids collide they produce small fragments that occasionally fall on Earth. These rocks are called meteorites and provide information about the primordial solar nebula. Most of these fragments have the size of sand grains. They burn up in the Earth's atmosphere, causing them to glow like meteors.

=== Comets ===
A comet is a small Solar System body that orbits the Sun and (at least occasionally) exhibits a coma (or atmosphere) and/or a tail—both primarily from the effects of solar radiation upon the comet's nucleus, which itself is a minor body composed of rock, dust, and ice.

=== Kuiper belt ===
The Kuiper belt, sometimes called the Edgeworth–Kuiper belt, is a region of the Solar System beyond the planets extending from the orbit of Neptune (at 30 AU) to approximately 55 AU from the Sun. It is similar to the asteroid belt, although it is far larger; 20 times as wide and 20–200 times as massive. Like the asteroid belt, it consists mainly of small bodies (remnants from the Solar System's formation) and at least one dwarf planet—Pluto, which may be geologically active. But while the asteroid belt is composed primarily of rock and metal, the Kuiper belt is composed largely of ices, such as methane, ammonia, and water. The objects within the Kuiper belt, together with the members of the scattered disc and any potential Hills cloud or Oort cloud objects, are collectively referred to as trans-Neptunian objects (TNOs). Two TNOs have been visited and studied at close range, Pluto and 486958 Arrokoth.

== See also ==
- Lunar soil
- Martian soil
- Water on terrestrial planets
