= Niépce (disambiguation) =

Niépce or Niepce may refer to:

- Nicéphore Niépce (1765–1833), French inventor, early pioneer of photography, created the oldest photograph that still survives
- Claude Niépce (1764–1828), French inventor, brother and collaborator of Nicéphore
- Niépce Prize, French photography award
- Niepce (crater), on the far side of the Moon
- Janine Niépce (1921–2007), French photojournalist
