= Van't Hoff (crater) =

Crater on the Moon

van't Hoff
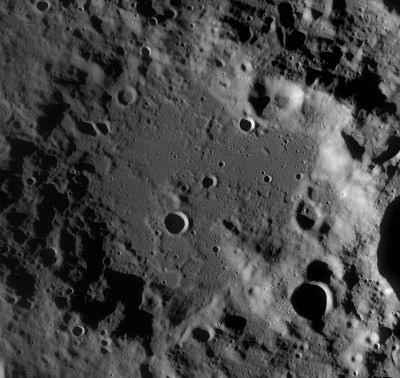
- LRO image
- Coordinates: 62.1°N 131.8°W
- Diameter: 92 km
- Depth: Unknown
- Colongitude: 134° at sunrise
- Eponym: Jacobus H. van 't Hoff

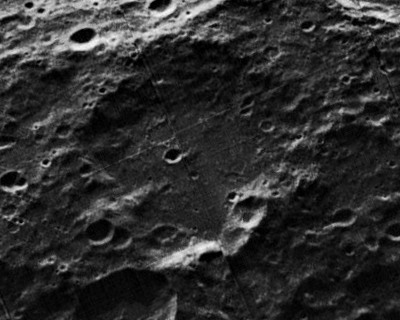
Oblique Lunar Orbiter 5 image

van't Hoff is a lunar impact crater on the far side of the Moon. It is located to the northeast of a walled plain named Birkhoff, To the northwest is the crater Stebbins, and to the east lies the smaller Dyson.

This crater lies at high northern latitudes of the lunar surface, almost two-thirds the way from the equator to the pole. The outer rim of van't Hoff is heavily eroded and the crater has become distorted in shape by subsequent impacts. The rim edge is ill-defined in the western half where the inner wall is unusually wide. This edge may have become overlain by ejecta from other impacts to the west.

Along the eastern face the crater has apparently merged with one or two other impacts, producing an outward double-bulge. There are several smaller impacts along the eastern rim, and a gouge in the surface forms a trough leading away to the northeast for nearly a crater diameter. Much of the interior floor of van't Hoff is relatively level, and is marked by some small craterlets. The most prominent of these is a small, cup-shaped crater in the southern half.

This formation is named after Dutch chemist Jacobus H. van 't Hoff.

== Satellite craters ==
By convention these features are identified on lunar maps by placing the letter on the side of the crater midpoint that is closest to van't Hoff.

| van't Hoff | Latitude | Longitude | Diameter |
|---|---|---|---|
| F | 61.5° N | 126.2° W | 41 km |
| M | 56.8° N | 132.1° W | 36 km |
| N | 57.9° N | 132.3° W | 46 km |
