= Mezentsev =

Mezentsev (masculine, Russian: Мезенцев) or Mezentseva (feminine, Russian: Мезенцева) is a Russian surname. Notable people with the surname include:

- Dmitry Mezentsev (born 1959), Russian politician
- Fyodor Mezentsev (born 1989), Kazakh speedskater
- Galina Mezentseva (born 1952), Russian ballerina

== See also ==
- Mezentsev (crater)
