= Heymans (crater) =

Crater on the Moon

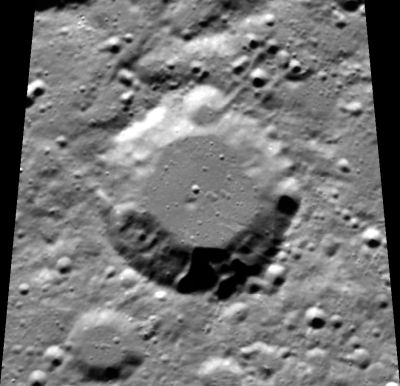
- Clementine mosaic
- Coordinates: 75.3°N 144.1°W
- Diameter: 50 km
- Depth: 3.07 km (1.91 mi)
- Colongitude: 144° at sunrise
- Eponym: Corneille J. F. Heymans

Heymans is a lunar impact crater that is located in the northern part of the Moon on the far side from the Earth. It lies between the craters Poinsot to the north and Hippocrates slightly farther to the south. To the southeast of Heymans is the larger Mezentsev.

This crater has been worn by subsequent impacts, but retains the general appearance of its original form. At the north end a small crater overlies the rim, and there are smaller impacts across the rim to the east and south. But the rim is generally round and symmetrical, with a slightly narrower inner wall to the northeast. Within the rim, the interior floor is level and nearly featureless.

== Satellite craters ==
By convention these features are identified on lunar maps by placing the letter on the side of the crater midpoint that is closest to Heymans.

Heymans	Latitude	Longitude	Diameter
D	76.8° N	132.3° W	25 km
F	75.0° N	133.6° W	50 km
T	75.2° N	155.4° W	31 km
