= Mezentsev (crater) =

Crater on the Moon

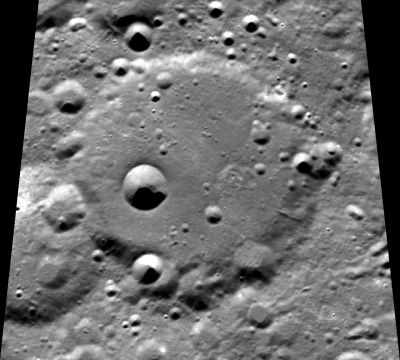
- Clementine mosaic
- Coordinates: 72.1°N 128.7°W
- Diameter: 89 km
- Depth: Unknown
- Colongitude: 133° at sunrise
- Eponym: Yurij B. Mezentsev

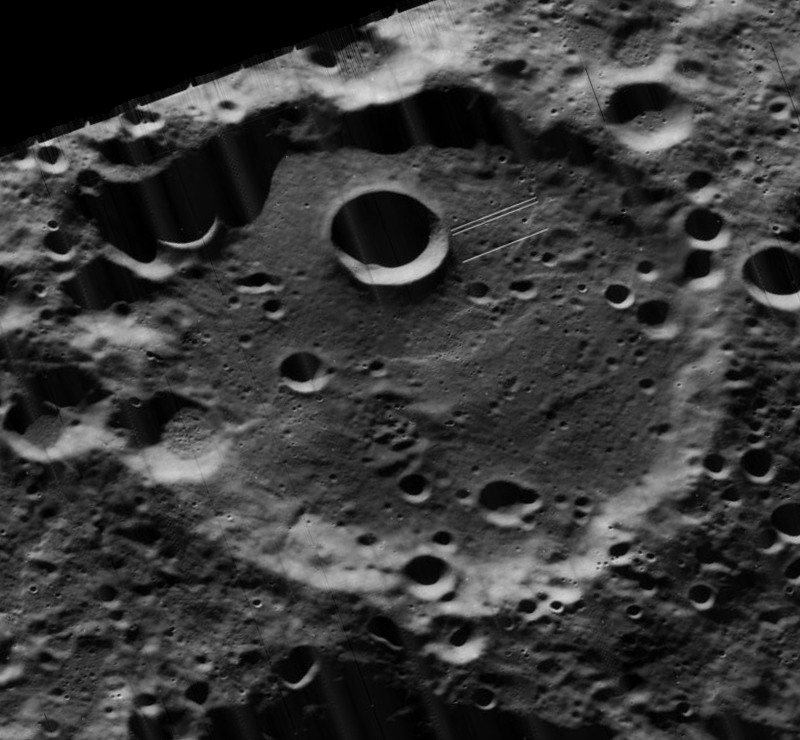
Oblique Lunar Orbiter 5 image, facing west

Mezentsev is a lunar impact crater that is located in the high northern latitudes on the Moon's far side. It lies just to the west of the smaller Niepce. To the southwest is the larger Stebbins, to the west-southwest is Hippocrates and to the northwest is Heymans.

This is a worn and eroded crater with a low outer rim and a relatively level interior. The circular nature of the rim can still be seen, but a number of impacts lie across the rim and the edge is generally softened and rounded. A smaller, unnamed crater is attached to the southwestern rim, with the satellite crater Mezentsev S laid across the western rim of this feature. The interior floor is roughly level but with some small craterlets marking the surface. The most prominent of these is a fresh, cup-shaped crater in the western half of the interior.

On some maps this crater has been labelled 'Mesentsev'.

== Satellite craters ==
By convention these features are identified on lunar maps by placing the letter on the side of the crater midpoint that is closest to Mezentsev.

Mezentsev	Latitude	Longitude	Diameter
M	68.7° N	126.8° W	74 km
Q	69.4° N	135.6° W	26 km
S	71.5° N	136.9° W	21 km
