= Kirkwood (crater) =

Lunar crater

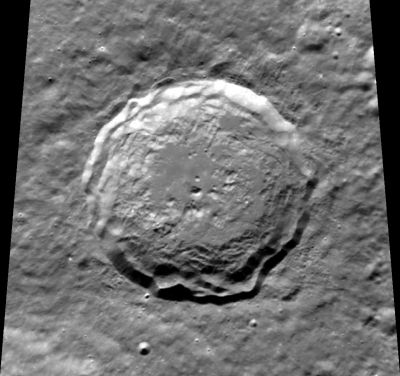
- Clementine mosaic
- Coordinates: 68.8°N 156.1°W
- Diameter: 68.12 km
- Depth: 5.29 km (3.29 mi)
- Colongitude: 200° at sunrise
- Eponym: Daniel Kirkwood

Kirkwood is a well-formed lunar impact crater that is located on the far side of the Moon, on the northern hemisphere, approximately 68 kilometers in diameter. It lies just to the northeast of the crater Sommerfeld, and Hippocrates is located to the east-northeast. It was named after American astronomer Daniel Kirkwood.

This formation dates to the Eratosthenian epoch of the lunar geologic timescale. The perimeter of this crater is generally circular, with a few slight outward notches particularly to the southeast. It displays very little appearance of wear, and neither the interior nor the outer rampart are marked by any craters of note.

The inner wall has slumped somewhat, and has formed a few terrace-like structures. The interior ejecta spreads a good way across the inner floor, covering nearly half the diameter. At the midpoint appear several small hills producing a central peak formation.

== Satellite craters ==
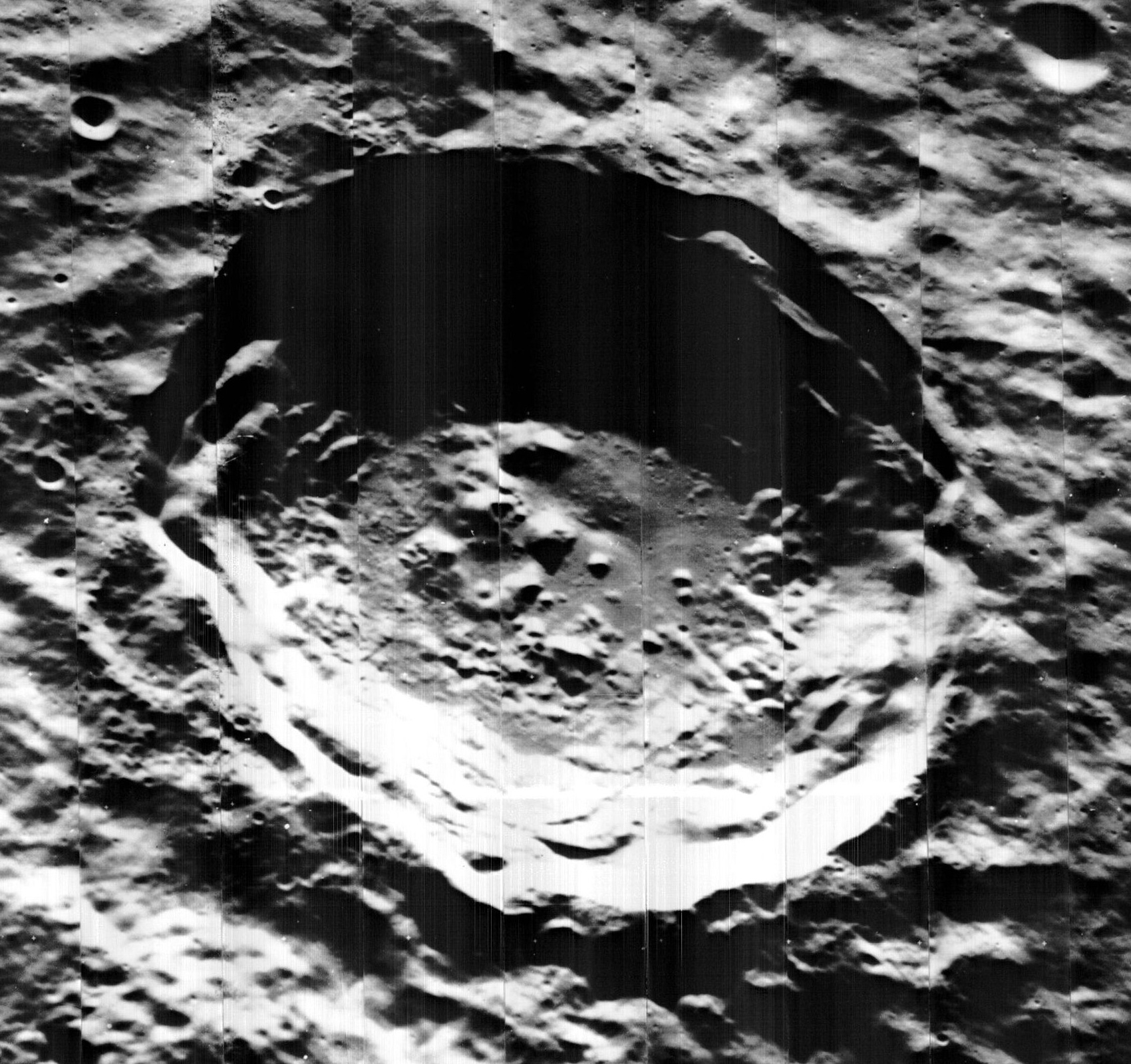
Image taken by the Lunar Orbiter 5 (1967)

By convention these features are identified on lunar maps by placing the letter on the side of the crater midpoint that is closest to Kirkwood.

Feature	Latitude	Longitude	Diameter	Ref
Kirkwood T	69.4° N	165.2° W	18.61 km	WGPSN
Kirkwood Y	72.2° N	157.5° W	17.21 km	WGPSN

== See also ==
- 1578 Kirkwood, asteroid
