= Rowland (crater) =

Crater on the Moon

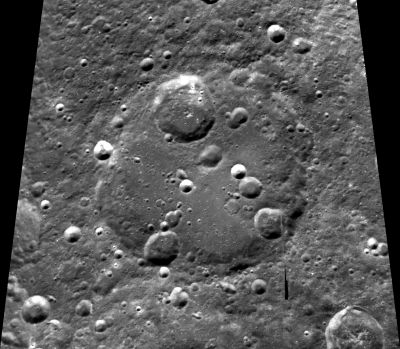
- Clementine mosaic
- Coordinates: 57.4°N 162.5°W
- Diameter: 171 km
- Depth: Unknown
- Colongitude: 163° at sunrise
- Eponym: Henry A. Rowland

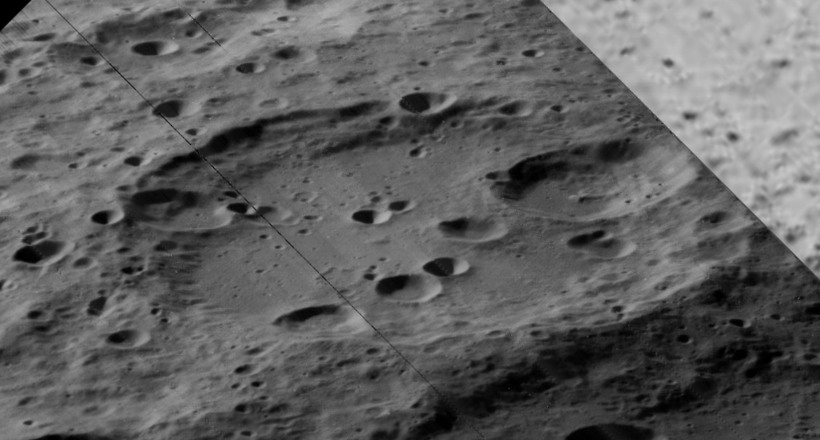
Mosaic of oblique Lunar Orbiter 5 images, facing northwest.

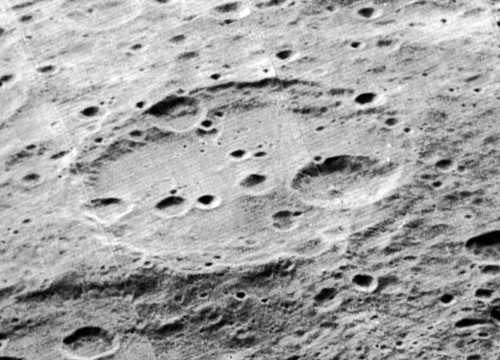
Another oblique view from Lunar Orbiter 5, facing west.

Rowland is a large lunar impact crater that is located in the northern part of the Moon, on the far side from the Earth. This is an old, worn formation that is overlain by a number of smaller craters. The most notable of these is Rowland Y, which is attached to the inner wall along the north-northwestern rim. Additional smaller craters are attached to the inner wall along the southeastern and south-southwestern rims, the latter being designated Rowland N. Rowland C forms a double crater with a smaller, bowl-shaped formation in the eastern part of the floor.

The outer wall of Rowland has been rounded by a long history of minor impacts, leaving the edge somewhat irregular and rough. The top of the rim has been worn down until it became almost level with the surrounding terrain, making this a circular depression in the surface. The remains of a terrace can still be discerned in places, particularly along the eastern and southeastern inner wall. The infrared spectrum of pure crystalline plagioclase has been identified on the crater floor.

Attached to the exterior of the eastern rim is the huge walled plain named Birkhoff, an even older and more worn formation. Due north of Rowland, within one crater diameter, is Sommerfeld. To the west-southwest is the smaller crater Chappell.

== Satellite craters ==
By convention these features are identified on lunar maps by placing the letter on the side of the crater midpoint that is closest to Rowland.

Rowland	Latitude	Longitude	Diameter
G	57.0° N	159.4° W	18 km
J	53.1° N	155.5° W	49 km
K	51.4° N	157.1° W	25 km
M	51.9° N	162.4° W	58 km
N	55.4° N	163.7° W	30 km
R	53.7° N	169.5° W	24 km
Y	59.1° N	163.0° W	54 km

The area south of Rowland R is characterised by an extremely high rockfall density by lunar standards.
