= Merrill (crater) =

Crater on the Moon

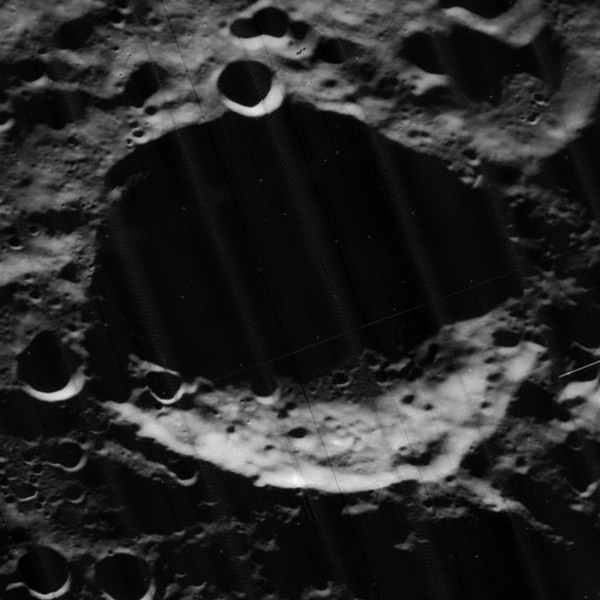
- Oblique Lunar Orbiter 5 image, facing west
- Coordinates: 75.2°N 116.3°W
- Diameter: 57 km
- Depth: Unknown
- Colongitude: 119° at sunrise
- Eponym: Paul W. Merrill

Merrill is a lunar impact crater. It is located in the high northern latitudes, on the far side. Less than one crater diameter to the south-southwest of Merrill is the similar Niepce, and to the east along the northern limb is the larger Brianchon.

The outer rim of Merrill is worn and the features are softened, but only a few impact craters lie along the edge and inner side. The inner walls are uneven slopes down to the relatively flat interior floor. This surface is marked by several small craterlets, including a pair near the midpoint. The satellite craters Merrill X and Merrill Y form a merged, dual-lobed feature that is attached to the northern outer rim of Merrill.

== Satellite craters ==
By convention these features are identified on lunar maps by placing the letter on the side of the crater midpoint that is closest to Merrill.

Merrill	Latitude	Longitude	Diameter
X	77.0° N	119.2° W	34 km
Y	76.8° N	115.4° W	35 km
