= Dyson (crater) =

Lunar impact crater

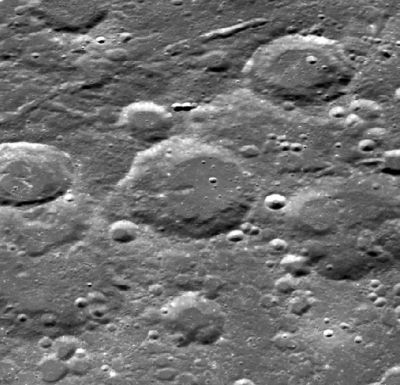
- Clementine image with Dyson at center
- Coordinates: 61.3°N 121.2°W
- Diameter: 63.14 km (39.23 mi)
- Colongitude: 187° at sunrise
- Formation: Nectarian
- Eponym: Frank W. Dyson

Dyson is a lunar impact crater, 63 kilometers in diameter, that lies on the far side of the Moon, past the northwest limb. It is located to the northwest of the crater Coulomb, and east of van't Hoff. Dyson lies at the approximate margin of the Coulomb-Sarton Basin, a 530 km wide impact crater of Pre-Nectarian age.

This formation dates to the Nectarian period of the lunar geologic timescale. An unusual aspect of this crater is the asymmetry of the inner wall. To the northeast the rim is low and the inner wall is quite narrow, almost non-existent. This portion of the rim overlies the interior of an unnamed depression in the surface; most likely a damaged crater. In the remaining arc between the eastern rim clockwise to the north, the inner wall is much wider. As a result, the level inner floor is offset toward the northeast. The interior has a central peak located near the midpoint of the crater, then forming a linear ridge that continues until it reaches the western inner wall. The floor is otherwise nearly featureless, except for a few tiny craterlets.

The rim and inner wall of Dyson have been somewhat worn by impact erosion, but are not overlaid by any impacts of significance. The small crater Dyson X is attached to the exterior of the rim along the north-northwest side. A smaller crater is nearly attached to the southwest rim, and this also lies along the northeast rim of the large satellite crater Dyson Q, a heavily eroded formation. A cluster of tiny craters is attached to the southeast rim of Dyson.

This formation is named after British astronomer Sir Frank Watson Dyson (1868-1939). Its designation was officially adopted by the International Astronomical Union in 1970.

== Satellite craters ==
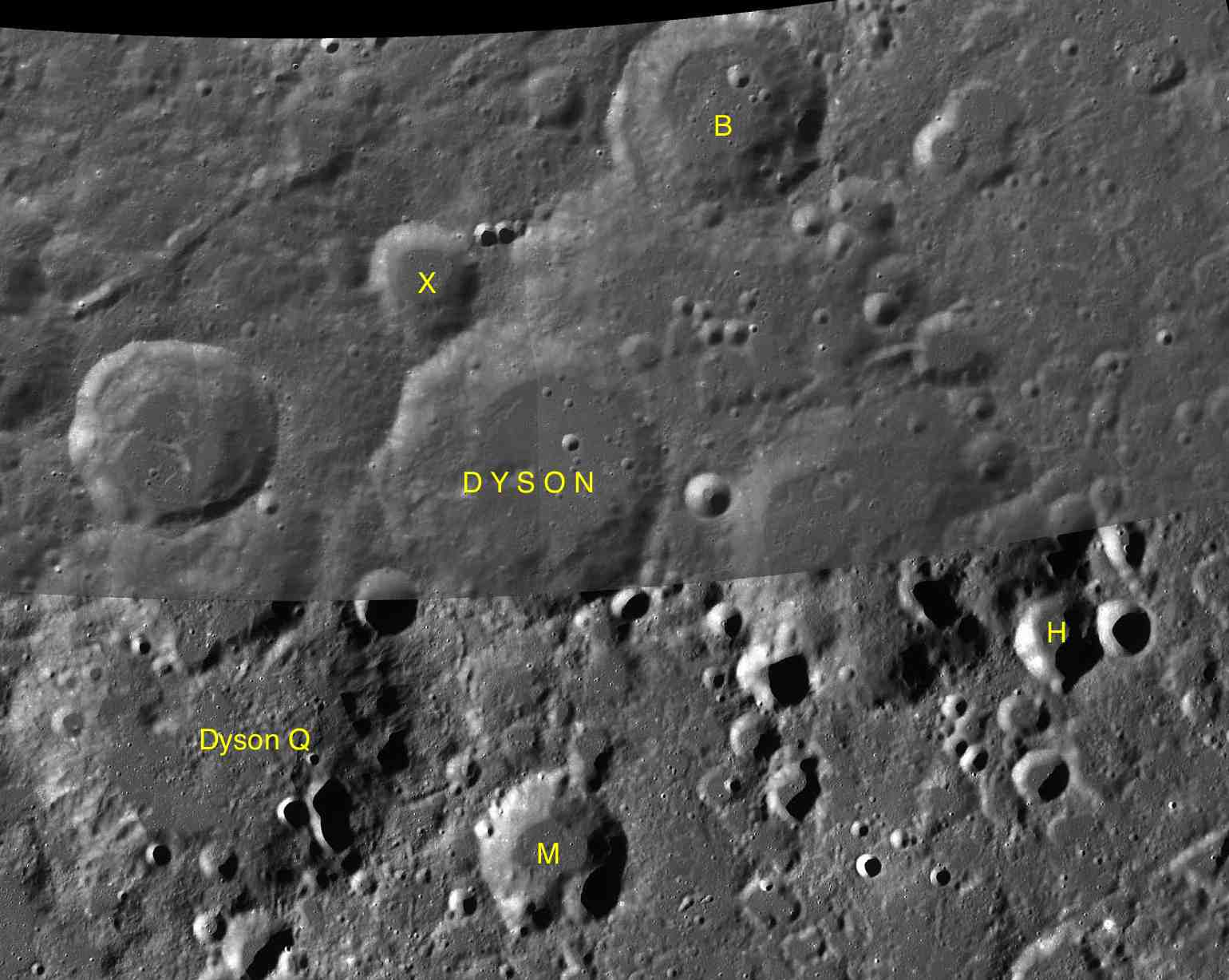
Satellite features of Dyson

By convention these features are identified on lunar maps by placing the letter on the side of the crater midpoint that is closest to Dyson.

Dyson	Latitude	Longitude	Diameter	Ref
B	63.6° N	117.6° W	49.64 km	WGPSN
H	59.5° N	113.7° W	20.96 km	WGPSN
M	58.4° N	120.9° W	31.5 km	WGPSN
Q	59.8° N	125.7° W	93.24 km	WGPSN
X	62.6° N	122.5° W	25.81 km	WGPSN

== See also ==
- 1241 Dysona, asteroid
