= Frank Watson Dyson =

English astronomer and physicist (1868–1939)

Sir Frank Dyson KBE FRS FRSE
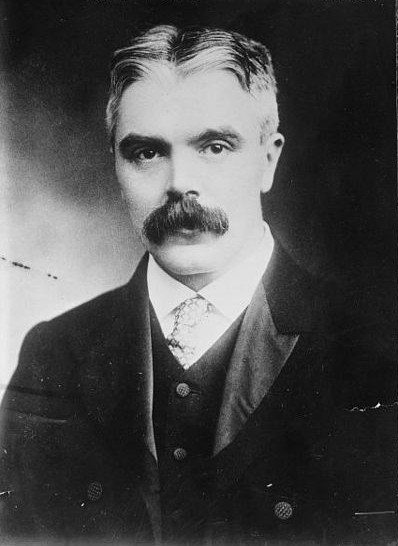
- Born: 8 January 1868; Measham, Leicestershire, England
- Died: 25 May 1939 (aged 71); At sea
- Education: Trinity College, Cambridge
- Known for: Astronomer Royal
- Awards: Royal Medal (1921)

9th Astronomer Royal
- In office 1910–1933
- Preceded by: William Christie
- Succeeded by: Harold Spencer Jones

Signature
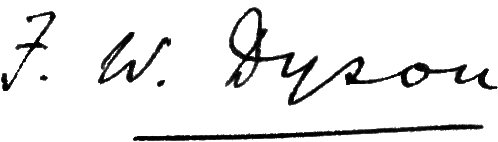

Sir Frank Watson Dyson, KBE, FRS, FRSE (8 January 1868 – 25 May 1939) was an English astronomer and the ninth Astronomer Royal. He is remembered today largely for introducing the Greenwich time signal ("six pips") to BBC radio, and for the role he played in proving Einstein's theory of general relativity.

== Early life and education ==
Dyson was born in Measham, near Ashby-de-la-Zouch, Leicestershire, the son of the Rev Watson Dyson, a Baptist minister, and his wife, Frances Dodwell. The family lived on St John Street in Wirksworth while Frank was one to three years old. They moved to Yorkshire in his youth. There he attended Heath Grammar School, Halifax, and subsequently won scholarships to Bradford Grammar School and Trinity College, Cambridge, where he studied mathematics and astronomy, being placed Second Wrangler in 1889.

== Career ==
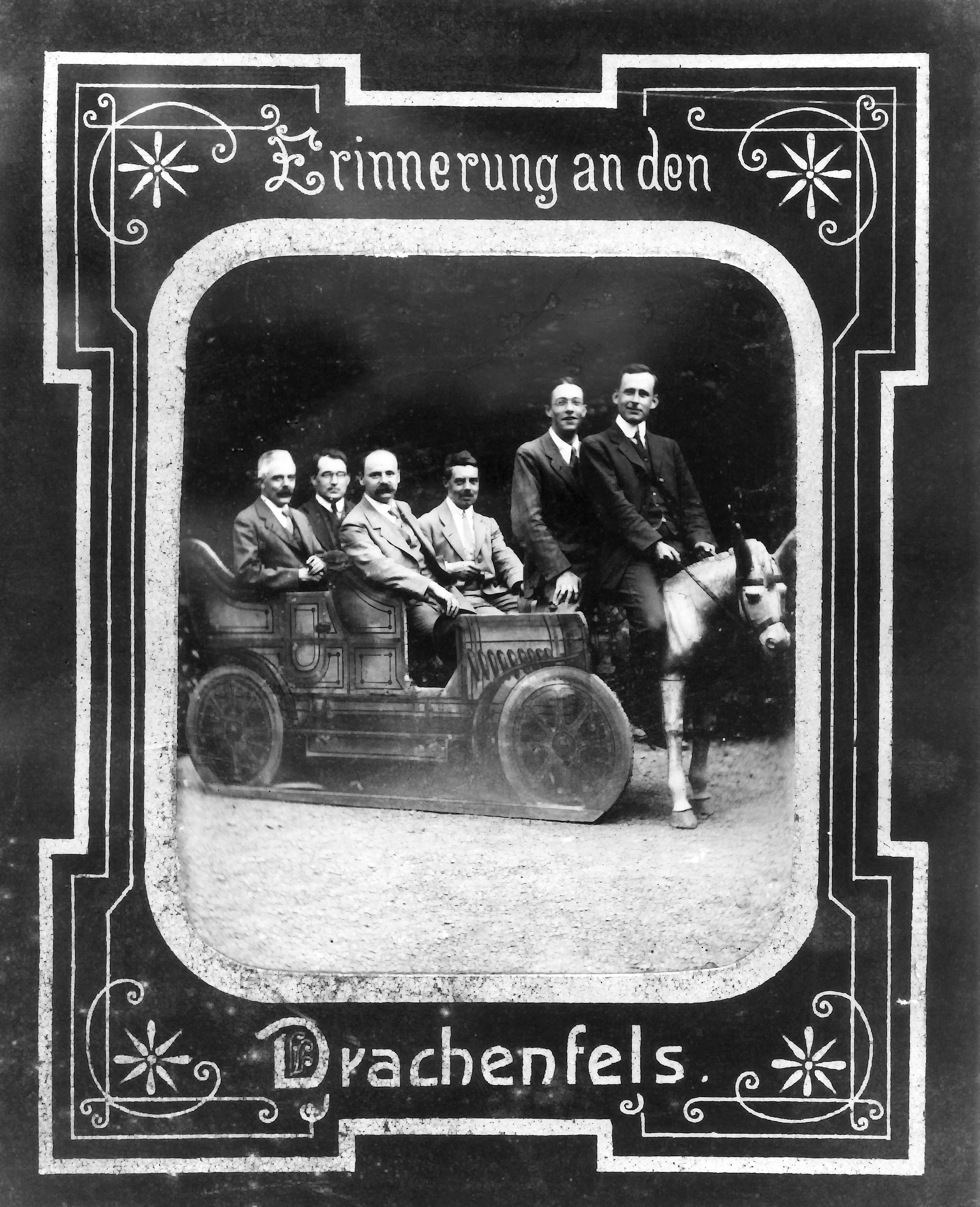
Dyson, fourth from the left, rides in an automobile; possibly during the Fifth Conference of the International Union for Co-operation in Solar Research, held in Bonn, Germany, 1913.

In 1894 he joined the Royal Astronomical Society, the British Astronomical Association and was given the post of Senior Assistant at Greenwich Observatory and worked on the Astrographic Catalogue, which was published in 1905. He was appointed Astronomer Royal for Scotland from 1905 to 1910, and Astronomer Royal (and Director of the Royal Greenwich Observatory) from 1910 to 1933.

In 1928, he introduced in the Observatory a new free-pendulum clock, the most accurate clock available at that time and organised the regular wireless transmission from the GPO wireless station at Rugby of Greenwich Mean Time. He also, in 1924, introduced the distribution of the "six pips" via the BBC. He was for several years President of the British Horological Institute and was awarded their gold medal in 1928.

== Discoveries ==
Dyson was noted for his study of solar eclipses and was an authority on the spectrum of the corona and on the chromosphere. He is credited with organising expeditions to observe the 1919 solar eclipse at Brazil and Príncipe, which he somewhat optimistically began preparing for prior to the Armistice of 11 November 1918.

Dyson presented his observations of the solar eclipse of May 29, 1919 to a joint meeting of the Royal Society and Royal Astronomical Society on 6 November 1919. The observations confirmed Albert Einstein's theory of the effect of gravity on light which until that time had been received with some scepticism by the scientific community.

== Honours and awards ==
- Fellow of the Royal Society – 1901

Dyson at the Fourth Conference International Union for Cooperation in Solar Research at Mount Wilson Observatory, 1910.

- Fellow of the Royal Society of Edinburgh – 1906
- President, Royal Astronomical Society – 1911–1913
- Vice-president, Royal Society – 1913–1915
- Knighted – 1915
- President, British Astronomical Association, 1916–1918
- Royal Medal of the Royal Society – 1921
- Bruce Medal of the Astronomical Society of the Pacific – 1922
- Gold Medal of the Royal Astronomical Society – 1925
- Knight Commander of the Order of the British Empire – 1926 Birthday Honours
- Gold medal of British Horological Institute – 1928
- President of the International Astronomical Union – 1928–1932
- Between 1894–1906, Dyson lived at 6 Vanbrugh Hill, Blackheath, London SE3, in a house now marked by a blue plaque.
- The crater Dyson on the Moon is named after him, as is the asteroid 1241 Dysona.

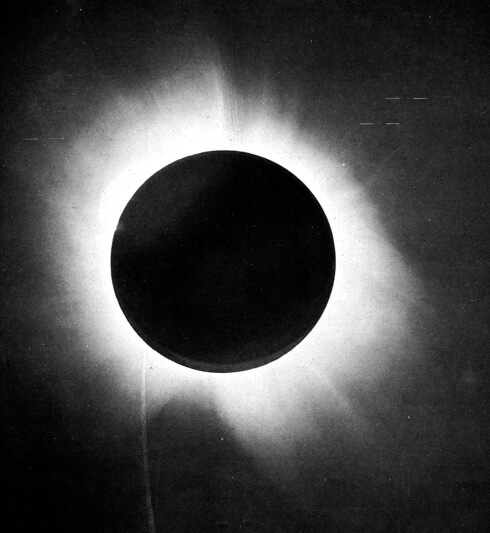
Eclipse photograph from 1919 expedition.

== Family ==
In 1894 he married Caroline Bisset Best (d.1937), the daughter of Palemon Best, with whom he had two sons and six daughters: Stella, Evelyn, Sylvia, Margaret, Palemon, Watson, Elsie and Ruth.

== Death ==
Frank Watson Dyson died at sea on board the ‘Ascanius’ returning from Australia on 25 May 1939. He was buried at sea the same day.

== Frank Dyson and Freeman Dyson ==
Although Frank Dyson and theoretical physicist Freeman Dyson were not known to be related, their fathers Rev Watson Dyson and George Dyson both hailed from West Yorkshire where the surname originates and is most densely clustered. Freeman Dyson credited Sir Frank with sparking his interest in astronomy: because they shared the same last name, Sir Frank's achievements were discussed by Freeman Dyson's family when he was a young boy.

Thus inspired, Freeman Dyson's first attempt at writing was a 1931 piece of juvenilia entitled "Sir Phillip Robert's Erolunar Collision" – Sir Philip being a thinly disguised version of Sir Frank.

== In popular media ==
Actor Alec McCowen was cast as Sir Frank Dyson in the TV series Longitude, broadcast in 2000.

== Selected writings ==
- Astronomy, Frank Dyson, London, Dent, 1910

== See also ==
- Einstein and Eddington
