= Nöther (crater) =

Crater on the Moon

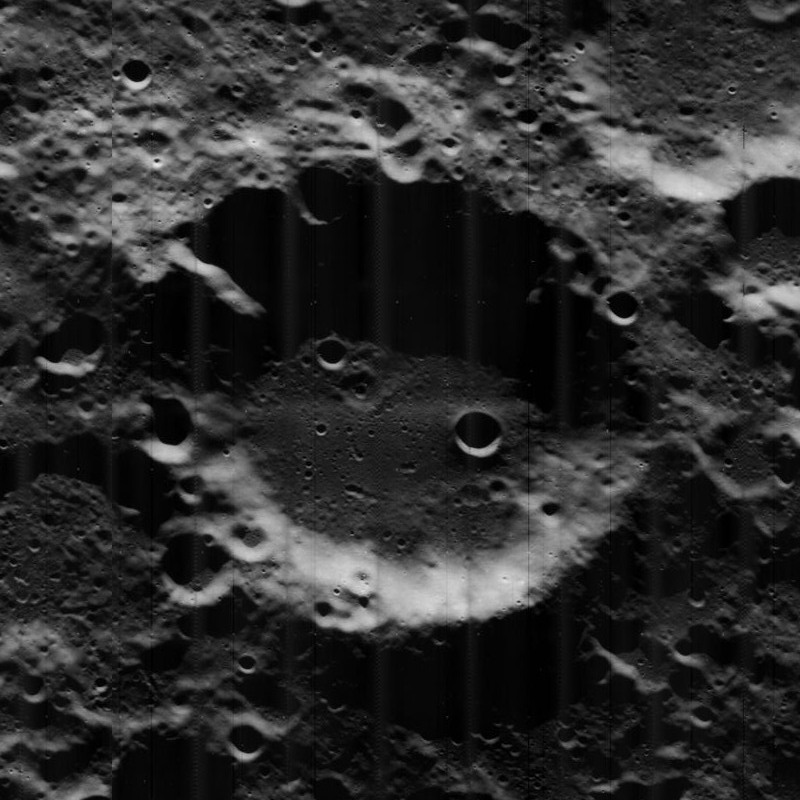
- Oblique Lunar Orbiter 5 image, facing west
- Coordinates: 66.6°N 113.5°W
- Diameter: 67 km
- Depth: Unknown
- Colongitude: 115° at sunrise
- Eponym: Emmy Noether

Nöther is a lunar impact crater on the far side of the Moon. It is located in the far northern latitudes, to the northwest of the walled plain Poczobutt. About two crater diameters to the north-northwest of Nöther lies Niepce. It is named after the German mathematician Emmy Noether.

This is an old, eroded feature with an outer rim that has become round-shouldered and marked with several small craterlets. The inner wall is narrower along the northeastern side, while the southern half is the most heavily marked by impacts. The interior floor is nearly level and featureless, with only a small craterlet near the north-northeastern inner wall and a tiny crater in the south-southwest.

== Satellite craters ==
By convention these features are identified on lunar maps by placing the letter on the side of the crater midpoint that is closest to Nöther.

Nöther	Latitude	Longitude	Diameter
A	69.3° N	112.1° W	29 km
E	67.6° N	105.1° W	47 km
T	66.3° N	121.5° W	44 km
U	67.6° N	123.4° W	36 km
V	68.9° N	122.4° W	26 km
X	68.9° N	116.8° W	30 km
