= Poinsot (crater) =

Lunar impact crater

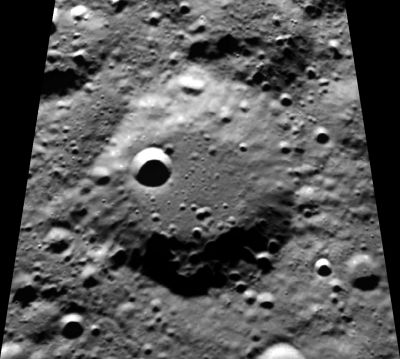
- Clementine mosaic
- Coordinates: 79.5°N 145.7°W
- Diameter: 68 km
- Depth: 3.84 km (2.39 mi)
- Colongitude: 146° at sunrise
- Eponym: Louis Poinsot

Poinsot is a worn lunar impact crater that is located at the northern part of the Moon on the far side. It lies to the south of the walled plain named Rozhdestvenskiy. To the south is the smaller crater Heymans.

This formation has been heavily worn by subsequent impacts, leaving a round-shouldered outer rim that is nearly even with the surrounding terrain and an inner surface that slopes down to the floor without terraces or horizontal features. A number of tiny craterlets lie along the rim edge and inner walls, as well as across the level interior surface. The floor lacks a central peak at the midpoint, but has a small but notable crater lying next to the western inner wall.

== Satellite craters ==
By convention these features are identified on lunar maps by placing the letter on the side of the crater midpoint that is closest to Poinsot.

Poinsot	Latitude	Longitude	Diameter
E	80.2° N	129.8° W	25 km
K	77.6° N	141.3° W	16 km
P	77.2° N	149.7° W	27 km
