= Daniel Kirkwood =

American astronomer

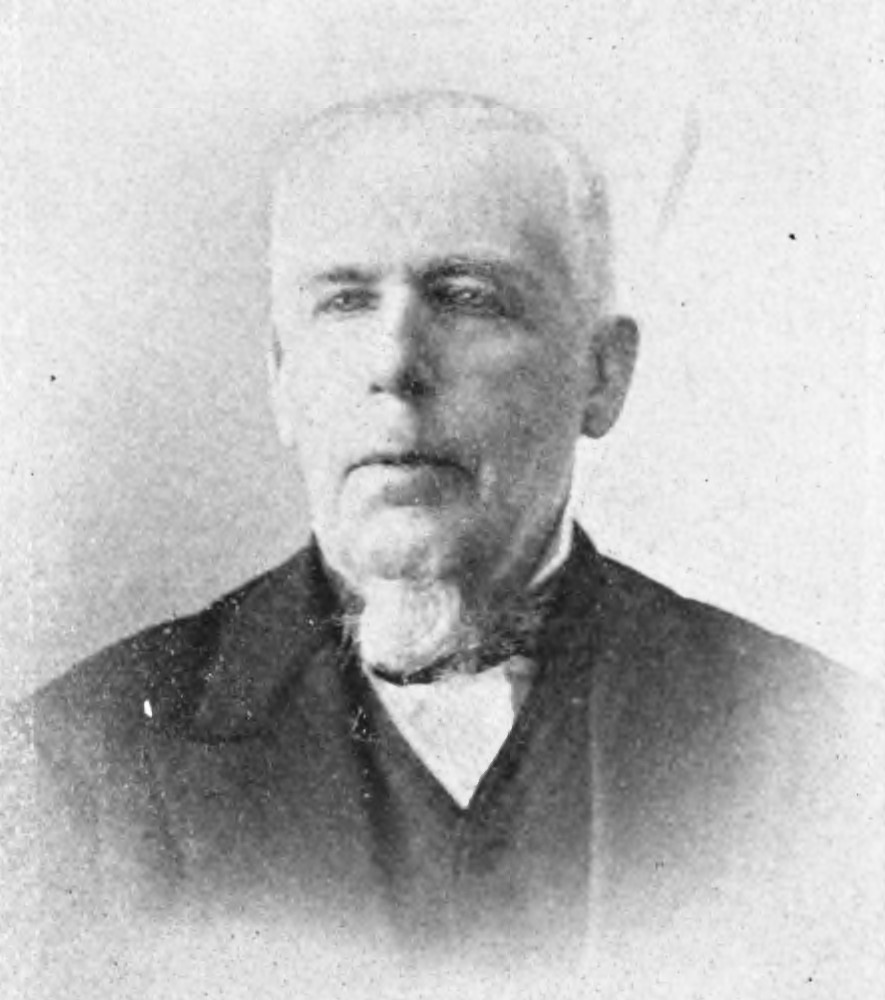
- Daniel Kirkwood
- Born: September 27, 1814; Harford County, Maryland
- Died: June 11, 1895 (aged 80); Riverside, California
- Education: York County Academy, York, PA
- Known for: Discovery of the Kirkwood gaps
- Scientific career
- Fields: astronomy, mathematics
- Workplaces: University of Delaware; Indiana University; Jefferson College; Stanford University

Daniel Kirkwood (September 27, 1814 – June 11, 1895) was an American astronomer.

Kirkwood was born in Harford County, Maryland, to John and Agnes (née Hope) Kirkwood. He graduated in mathematics from the York County Academy in York, Pennsylvania, in 1838. After teaching there for five years, he became Principal of the Lancaster High School in Lancaster, Pennsylvania, and after another five years he moved on to become Principal of the Pottsville Academy in Pottsville, Pennsylvania. In 1851, he was elected as a member to the American Philosophical Society. The same year he became Professor of Mathematics at Delaware College and in 1856 Professor of Mathematics at Indiana University in Bloomington, Indiana, where he stayed until his retirement in 1886, with the exception of two years, 1865–1867, at Jefferson College in Canonsburg, Pennsylvania.

Kirkwood's most significant contribution came from his study of asteroid orbits. When arranging the then-growing number of discovered asteroids by their distance from the Sun, he noted several gaps, now named Kirkwood gaps in his honor, and associated these gaps with orbital resonances with the orbit of Jupiter. Further, Kirkwood also suggested a similar dynamic was responsible for Cassini Division in Saturn's rings, as the result of a resonance with one of Saturn's moons. In the same paper, he was the first to correctly posit that the material in meteor showers is cometary debris.

Kirkwood also identified a pattern relating the distances of the planets to their rotation periods, which was called Kirkwood's Law. This discovery earned Kirkwood an international reputation among astronomers; he was dubbed "the American Kepler" by Sears Cook Walker, who claimed that Kirkwood's Law proved the widely held Solar Nebula Theory. The "Law" has since become discredited as new measurements of planetary rotation periods have shown that the pattern doesn't hold.

In 1891, at age 77, he became a lecturer in astronomy at Stanford University. He died in Riverside, California, in 1895.

Altogether he wrote 129 publications, including three books. The asteroid 1951 AT was named 1578 Kirkwood in his honor and so was the lunar impact crater Kirkwood, as well as Indiana University's Kirkwood Observatory. He is buried in the Rose Hill Cemetery in Bloomington, Indiana, where Kirkwood Avenue is named for him.

Kirkwood was a cousin of Iowa governor Samuel Jordan Kirkwood who became United States Secretary of the Interior under President James A. Garfield and President Chester A. Arthur.
