= Corneille Heymans =

Belgian physiologist and Nobel laureate (1892–1968)

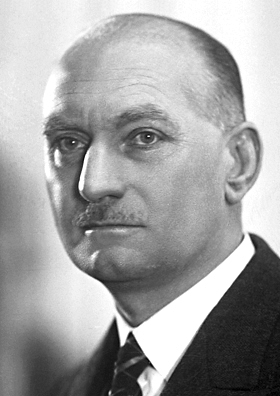
- Born: 28 March 1892; Ghent, Flanders, Belgium
- Died: 18 July 1968 (aged 76); Knokke, Flanders, Belgium
- Education: Ghent University
- Known for: Vascular Presso- and Chemo-Receptors in Respiratory Control (blood pressure)
- Awards: Nobel Prize for Physiology or Medicine (1938)
- Scientific career
- Fields: Physiology
- Workplaces: Ghent University
- Notable students: Paul Janssen

Corneille Jean François Heymans (28 March 1892 – 18 July 1968) was a Belgian physiologist. He studied at the Jesuit College of Saint Barbara and then at Ghent University, where he obtained a doctor's degree in 1920.

Heymans won the Nobel Prize for Physiology or Medicine in 1938 for showing how blood pressure and the oxygen content of the blood are measured by the body and transmitted to the brain.

== Early life and education ==
After graduation Heymans worked at the Collège de France (under Prof. E. Gley), the University of Lausanne (under Prof. M. Arthus), the University of Vienna (under Prof. H. H. Meyer), University College London (under Prof. E. H. Starling) and Case Western Reserve University School of Medicine (under Prof. C. F. Wiggers). In 1922 Heymans became lecturer in Pharmacodynamics at Ghent University, and in 1930 succeeded his father, Jean-François Heymans, as Professor of Pharmacology, as well as being appointed Head of the Department of Pharmacology, Pharmacodynamics, and Toxicology; and Director of the J. F. Heymans Institute.

== Research ==
Heymans was awarded the Nobel Prize for Physiology or Medicine in 1938 for showing how blood pressure and the oxygen content of the blood are measured in the body and transmitted to the brain via the nerves and not by the blood itself.

Heymans accomplished this by vivisection of two dogs, the head of one connected to its body only by nerves, and the second one's body was used to cross-perfuse (supply blood) to the first dog's head. Heymans found that the first dog's upward and downward cardiovascular reflex arc traffic were carried by its own vagus nerves, but agents introduced to the second dog's blood, which served the first dog's brain, had no effect. He used a similar experiment to demonstrate the role of peripheral chemoreceptors in respiratory regulation, for which he received his Nobel Prize.

He was the Editor-in-Chief of Archives Internationales de Pharmacodynamie et de Thérapie for many years. His memberships included the Pontifical Academy of Sciences, the Académie des Sciences, and the Royal Society of Arts.

The group of physiopharmacologists working under Heymans at Ghent University were looking for the anatomical basis of the respiratory reflex at the carotid sinus. It was necessary that the Spanish neurohistologist Fernando de Castro Rodríguez (1898–1967) described in detail the innervation of the aorta-carotid region, circumscribing the presence of baroreceptors to the carotid sinus, but that of chemoreceptors to the carotid body, for the Belgian group to move their focus from the first to the very small second structure to physiologically demonstrate the nature and function of the first blood chemoreceptors. The contribution of the young De Castro, maybe the last direct disciple of Santiago Ramón y Cajal (1852–1934; awarded the 1906 Nobel prize in Physiology or Medicine) was overlooked at the time, but it was later recognized that he deserved to share the Nobel Prize with Heymans, his colleague and friend.

== Personal life ==
Heymans married Berthe May (1892–1974), an ophthalmologist, in 1929 and had five children. He died in Knokke from a stroke. He was Catholic.

== Honours and awards ==
- Heymans (crater) on the Moon
- Nobel Prize for Physiology or Medicine (1938)
- Member, American Philosophical Society (1962)
