= 1578 Kirkwood =

Asteroid in the Hilda group

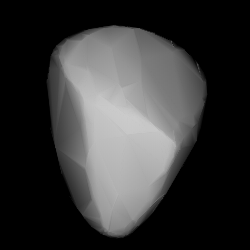
- Shape model of Kirkwood from its lightcurve

Discovery
- Discovered by: Indiana University (Indiana Asteroid Program)
- Discovery site: Goethe Link Obs.
- Discovery date: 10 January 1951

Designations
- Named after: Daniel Kirkwood (American astronomer)
- Alternative designations: 1951 AT · 1944 DF; 1949 TF · 1952 FK
- Minor planet category: main-belt · (outer); Hilda

Orbital characteristics
- Epoch 4 September 2017 (JD 2458000.5)
- Uncertainty parameter 0
- Observation arc: 73.37 yr (26,797 days)
- Aphelion: 4.8617 AU
- Perihelion: 2.9855 AU
- Semi-major axis: 3.9236 AU
- Eccentricity: 0.2391
- Orbital period (sidereal): 7.77 yr (2,839 days)
- Mean anomaly: 195.23°
- Mean motion: 0° 7^{m} 36.48^{s} / day
- Inclination: 0.8085°
- Longitude of ascending node: 74.002°
- Argument of perihelion: 1.7729°
- Jupiter MOID: 0.4366 AU

Physical characteristics
- Dimensions: 47.077±0.315 km 51.88±1.8 km 57.14±1.27 km
- Synodic rotation period: 12.518±0.002 h 17.9±0.1 h (Note: Slyusarev (2012) web; for (1578) Kirkwood: rotation period of 17.9 hours with a brightness amplitude of 0.22 mag. Summary figures given at the LCDB)
- Geometric albedo: 0.044±0.002; 0.0517±0.004; 0.063±0.005
- Spectral type: Tholen = D · D B–V = 0.788; U–B = 0.276
- Absolute magnitude (H): 10.26 · 10.41±0.50

1578 Kirkwood, provisional designation 1951 AT, is a Hilda asteroid from the outermost regions of the asteroid belt, approximately 52 kilometers in diameter. It was discovered on 10 January 1951, by astronomers of the Indiana Asteroid Program at Goethe Link Observatory in Indiana, United States. The asteroid was named after American astronomer Daniel Kirkwood.

== Orbit and classification ==
Kirkwood belongs to the orbital Hilda group, which is located outermost part of the main belt. Asteroids in this dynamical group have semi-major axis between 3.7 and 4.2 AU and stay in a 3:2 resonance with the gas giant Jupiter. Kirkwood, however, is a background asteroid and not a member of the (collisional) Hilda family (101).

It orbits the Sun at a distance of 3.0–4.9 AU once every 7 years and 9 months (2,839 days). Its orbit has an eccentricity of 0.24 and an inclination of 1° with respect to the ecliptic.

The asteroid was first observed as 1944 DF at Turku Observatory in February 1944. The body's observation arc begins with its observation as 1949 TF at Heidelberg Observatory in October 1949, fifteen months prior to its official discovery observation at Goethe Link.

== Physical characteristics ==
In the Tholen classification, Kirkwood is a dark D-type asteroid. It is also characterized as a D-type by PanSTARRS photometric survey.

=== Rotation period ===
In October 2012, a rotational lightcurve of Kirkwood was obtained from photometric observations at the Etscorn Campus Observatory (719) in New Mexico, United States. Lightcurve analysis gave a rotation period of 12.518 hours with a brightness variation of 0.05 magnitude (U=2). Another lightcurve gave a period of 17.9 hours and an amplitude of 0.22 magnitude (U=2).

=== Diameter and albedo ===
According to the surveys carried out by the Japanese Akari satellite, the NEOWISE mission of NASA's Wide-field Infrared Survey Explorer and the Infrared Astronomical Satellite IRAS, Kirkwood measures between 47.077 and 57.14 kilometers in diameter and its surface has an albedo between 0.044 and 0.063.

The Collaborative Asteroid Lightcurve Link adopts the results obtained by IRAS, that is, an albedo of 0.0517 and a diameter of 51.88 kilometers based on an absolute magnitude of 10.26.

== Naming ==
This minor planet was named in memory of American astronomer Daniel Kirkwood (1814–1895), long-time professor of mathematics at Indiana University. He discovered the Kirkwood gaps, which are gaps in the distribution of the mean distances of the minor planets in the asteroid belt. Kirkwood was the Indiana Asteroid Program's first numbered discovery. (Note: Although the asteroid 1575 Winifred, also discovered by the Indiana Asteroid Program, has both a lower number and an earlier discovery date (20 April 1950) than 1578 Kirkwood) The official naming citation was published by the Minor Planet Center in March 1952 (M.P.C. 738). The lunar crater Kirkwood was also named in the astronomer's honor.
