= Birkhoff (crater) =

Crater on the Moon

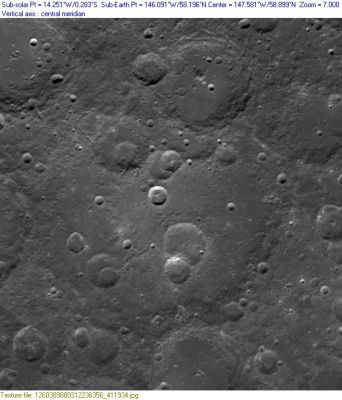
- Clementine mosaic
- Coordinates: 58.7°N 146.1°W
- Diameter: 329.81 km (204.93 mi)
- Depth: 4.76 km (2.96 mi)
- Colongitude: 156° at sunrise
- Formation: Pre-Nectarian
- Eponym: George D. Birkhoff

Birkhoff is a giant lunar walled plain that is located on the far side of the Moon, in the northern hemisphere. This class of formation is known as a peak ring basin, which has a single interior topographic ring or a discontinuous ring of peaks with no central peak. It is an ancient impact site that has been heavily eroded, and the surface reshaped by multiple craters in the interior and along the rim. The outer wall is bordered by the craters Carnot to the south, Rowland along the west rim, and Stebbins, which is intruding into the north. Just to the northeast is van't Hoff.

This formation is one of the oldest lunar basins, dating to the Pre-Nectarian epoch of the lunar geologic timescale. What remains of the perimeter is now a rugged sloping rise along the inner wall, and the rim has been worn down until it is level with the irregular external terrain. The rim is pock-marked by small craters of various dimensions.

Within the crater are several craters that are notable in their own right. Along the northwest inner rim is the eroded Birkhoff X, while due south in the southwest floor is Birkhoff Q. The later is joined by a low ridge to the double crater formation of Birkhoff K and L in the eastern half of the crater. In the northern interior are the smaller but relatively young Birkhoff Y and Z. The remainder of the floor is flat in places, with rough sections and many tiny craterlets. The infrared spectrum of pure crystalline plagioclase has been identified on the southern floor.

This crater was named after American mathematician George D. Birkhoff (1884–1944). Its designation was formally adopted by the International Astronomical Union in 1970.

== Satellite craters ==
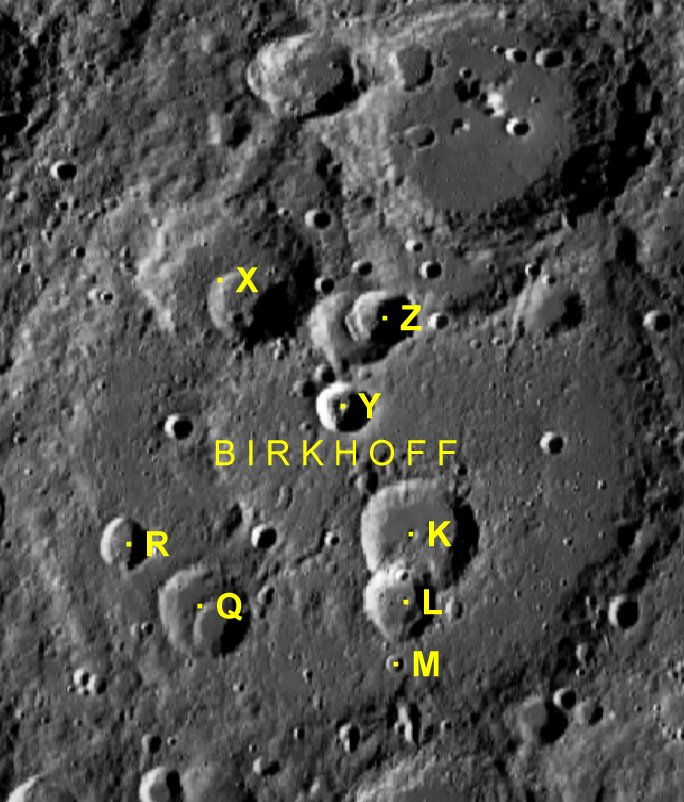
Satellite craters

By convention these features are identified on lunar maps by placing the letter on the side of the crater midpoint that is closest to Birkhoff.

Birkhoff	Latitude	Longitude	Diameter
K	57.8° N	144.3° W	58 km
L	56.6° N	144.8° W	37 km
M	54.7° N	144.8° W	23 km
Q	56.6° N	150.8° W	43 km
R	57.5° N	153.0° W	27 km
X	62.1° N	149.7° W	77 km
Y	59.9° N	146.6° W	25 km
Z	61.3° N	145.3° W	30 km

Birkhoff Z dates to the Copernican period.

== Gallery ==
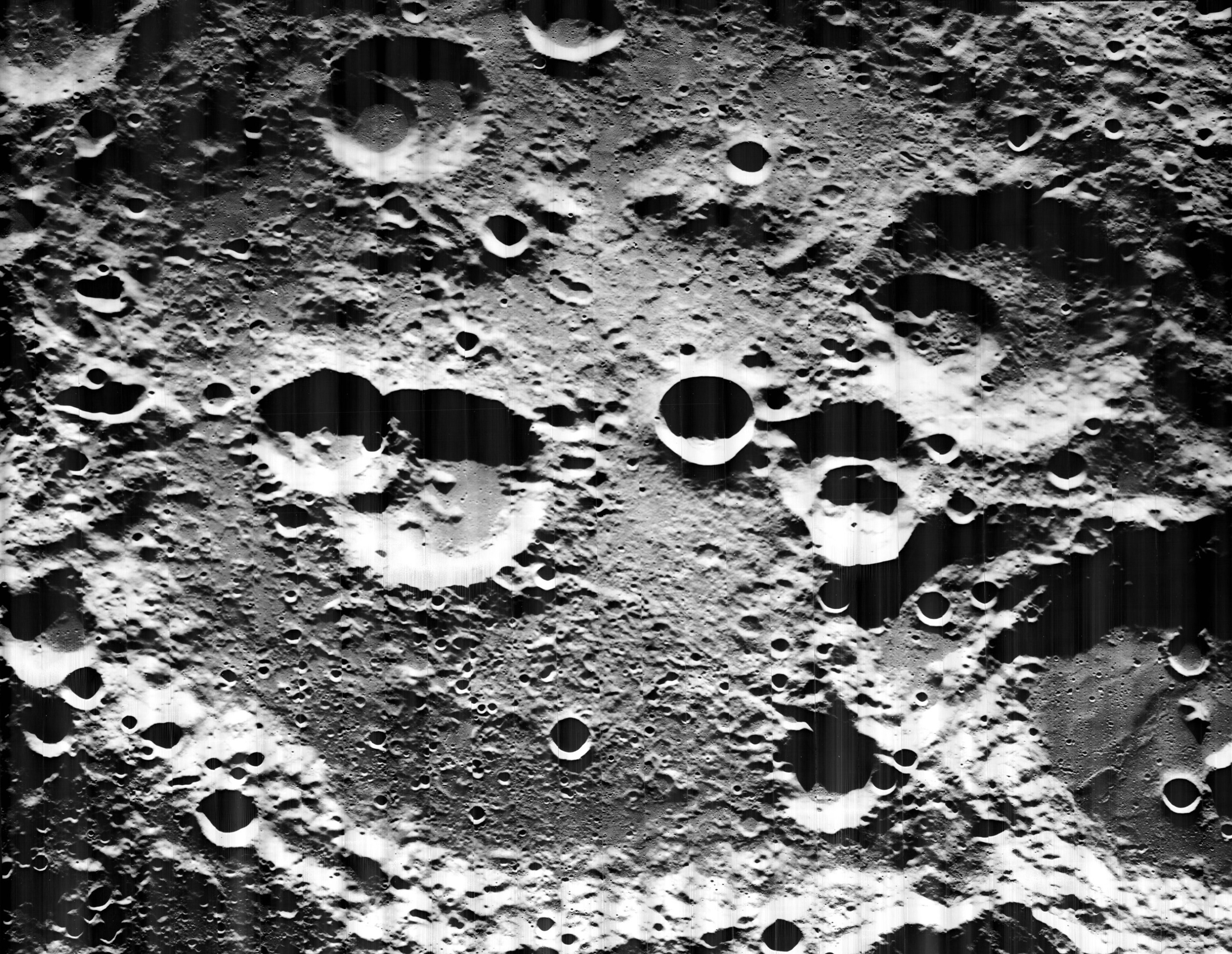
Most of Birkhoff interior, facing west, from Lunar Orbiter 5

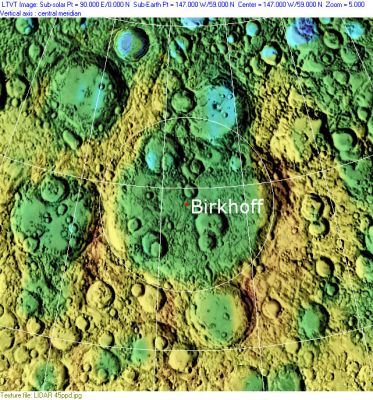
LIDAR image
