= Niepce (crater) =

Crater on the Moon

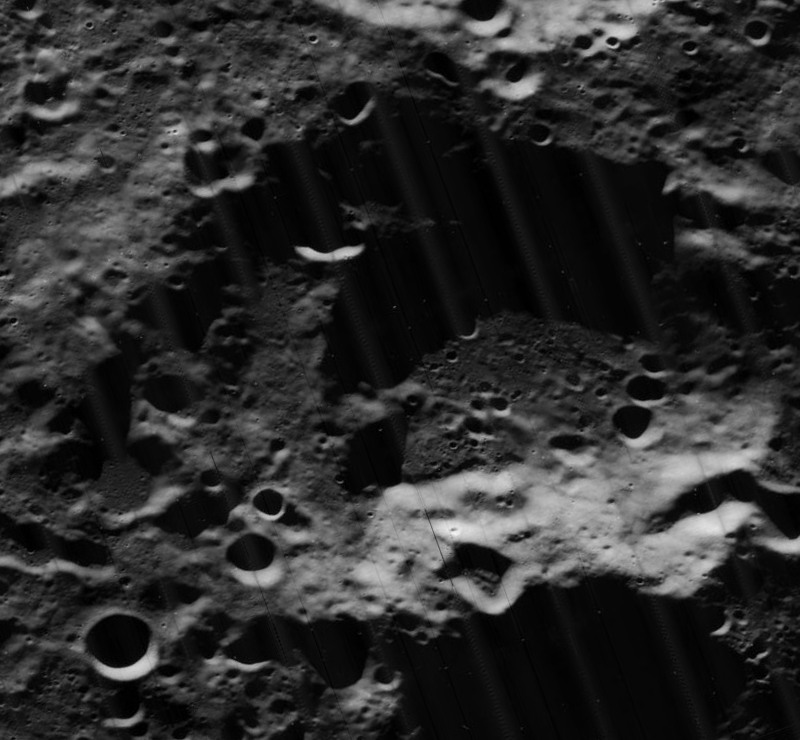
- Oblique Lunar Orbiter 5 image, facing west
- Coordinates: 72.7°N 119.1°W
- Diameter: 57 km
- Depth: Unknown
- Colongitude: 120° at sunrise
- Eponym: J. Nicéphore Niépce

Niepce is a crater on the far side of the Moon. It lies in the high northern latitudes, just behind the north-northwestern limb. Less than a crater diameter to the north is the crater Merrill, and just to the west is Mezentsev. Farther to the south-southeast is Nöther.

This is a worn crater formation with rim features that have been softened and rounded by subsequent deposits of ejecta. Attached to the eastern rim is the satellite crater Niepce F, and the inner wall of Niepce is wider along this edge. The remaining interior floor is relatively level, and offset toward the western side. There are several small impacts on the floor, the largest being a small craterlet along the north-northeastern edge. Just along the southwest rim edge is a small, teardrop-shaped crater that was likely created by a low angle impact.

The crater is named after Nicéphore Niépce who is widely credited for having taken the first ever permanent photograph in 1825.

== Satellite craters ==
By convention these features are identified on lunar maps by placing the letter on the side of the crater midpoint that is closest to Niepce.

Niepce	Latitude	Longitude	Diameter
F	72.5° N	113.5° W	44 km
