= Stebbins (crater) =

Crater on the Moon

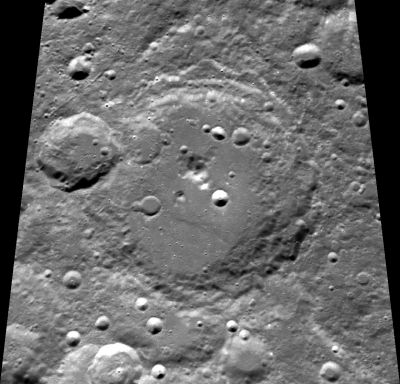
- Clementine mosaic
- Coordinates: 64.8°N 141.8°W
- Diameter: 131 km
- Depth: Unknown
- Colongitude: 142° at sunrise
- Formation: Pre-Nectarian
- Eponym: Joel Stebbins

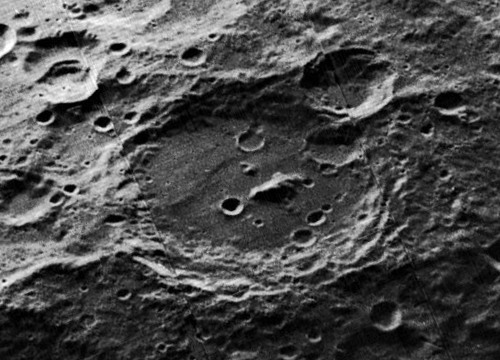
Oblique Lunar Orbiter 5 image

Stebbins is a large lunar impact crater on the far side of the Moon. It is located along the north-northeastern rim of the even larger crater Birkhoff, with about one-third of Stebbins laid across the interior of Birkhoff. To the north of Stebbins is the smaller Hippocrates, and to the west is Sommerfeld.

This is a worn and eroded crater with smaller impacts along the rim edge and the interior. The most notable of these is a small crater across the northwestern rim. The interior floor is relatively flat, with a central ridge offset to the northeast of the midpoint. To the southeast of this ridge is a small craterlet, and to the southwest is a small hill and the outer rim of a partly submerged craterlet.

== Satellite craters ==
By convention these features are identified on lunar maps by placing the letter on the side of the crater midpoint that is closest to Stebbins.

Stebbins	Latitude	Longitude	Diameter
C	67.7° N	133.6° W	39 km
U	65.4° N	147.6° W	44 km
