= Hippocrates (lunar crater) =

Crater on the Moon

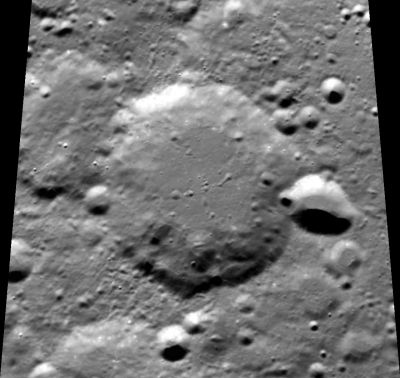
- Clementine mosaic
- Coordinates: 70.7°N 145.9°W
- Diameter: 60 km
- Depth: Unknown
- Colongitude: 148° at sunrise
- Eponym: Hippocrates

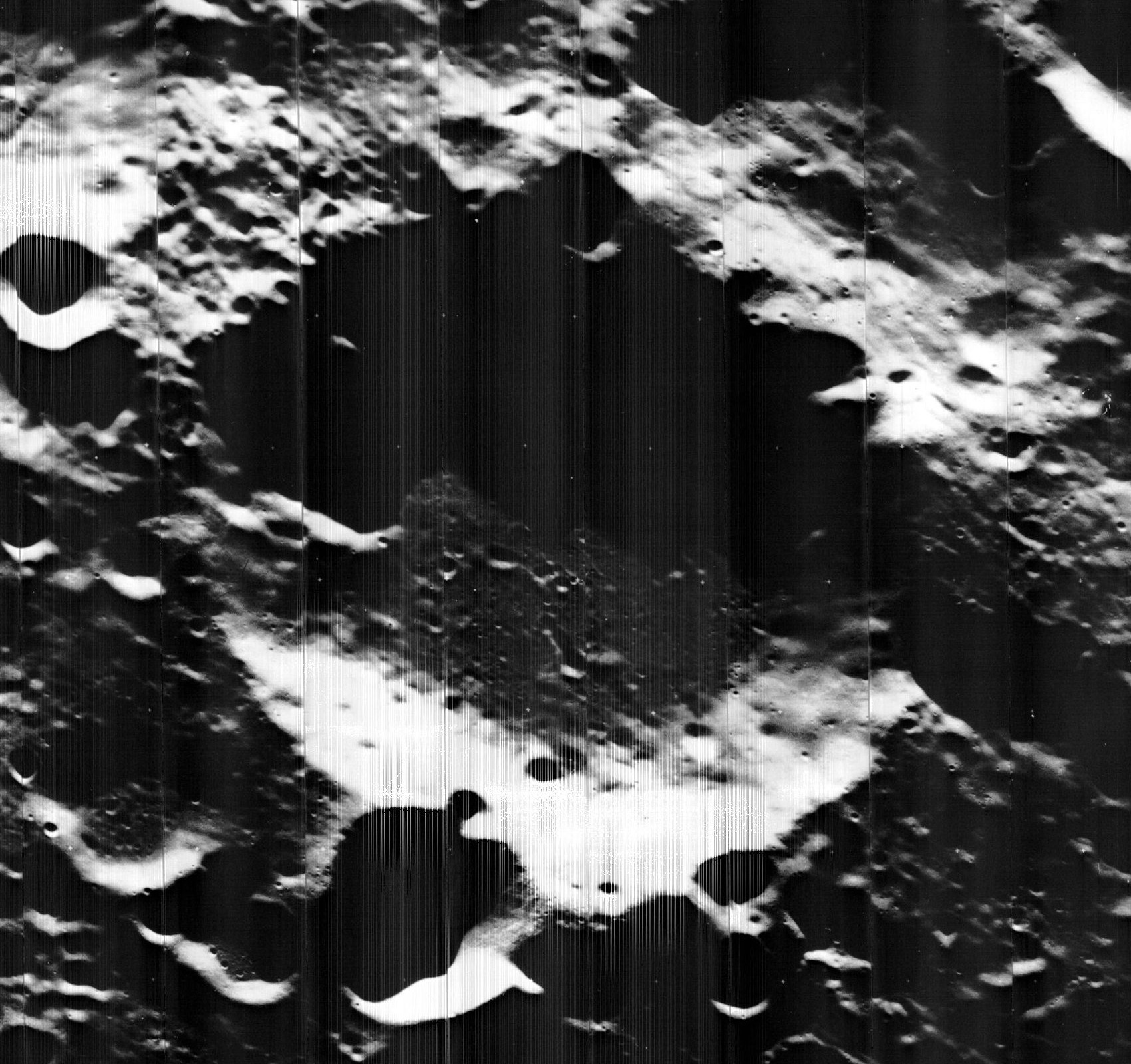
Lunar Orbiter 5 image

Hippocrates is a lunar impact crater on the far side of the Moon. It is located in the northern region of the lunar surface, to the north of the crater Stebbins. To the southwest of Hippocrates are Kirkwood and the large Sommerfeld.

This is a relatively old formation that has become worn and eroded due to subsequent impacts. The general outline of the outer rim is still visible, but it is overlaid along the eastern edge by a smaller crater. There is also a small craterlet along the western edge. The inner wall is marked by a number of tiny craterlets, and is slightly wider at the southern edge with a ridge-like projection. The interior floor is level and almost featureless, with only a few tiny craterlets to mark the surface.

This crater was named after Hippocrates, the ancient Greek physician.

== Satellite craters ==
By convention these features are identified on lunar maps by placing the letter on the side of the crater midpoint that is closest to Hippocrates.

Hippocrates	Latitude	Longitude	Diameter
Q	69.0° N	148.0° W	35 km
