= Sommerfeld (crater) =

Lunar crater

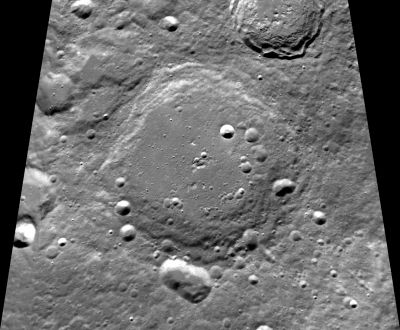
- Clementine mosaic
- Coordinates: 65.2°N 162.4°W
- Diameter: 169 km
- Depth: Unknown
- Colongitude: 165° at sunrise
- Eponym: Arnold J. Sommerfeld

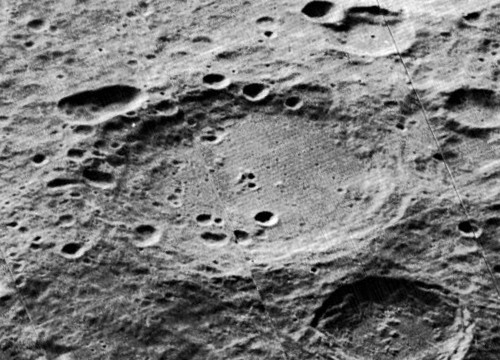
Oblique view from Lunar Orbiter 5

Sommerfeld is a sizable lunar impact crater situated in the far northern latitudes of the Moon. Located on the far side, it can only be observed from orbit. Positioned to the south of Sommerfeld is Rowland, a crater about the same size as Sommerfeld. Southeast of Sommerfeld lies the huge walled plain named Birkhoff.

This crater is classified as a walled plain on the lunar surface, characterized by a relatively flat interior encircled by a ring mountain. Its outer rim exhibits moderate erosion, retaining traces of a terrace structure albeit softened and rounded. Along the rim edge and inner wall to the south and southeast, several small craterlets are present. Additionally, a merged pair of small craters is attached to the southern outer rim. The inner wall appears slightly wider along the eastern side, possibly due to deposits of ejecta from nearby impacts.

The interior floor of Sommerfeld consists of a nearly level plain, likely smoothed out by deposits of materials over time. The infrared spectrum of pure crystalline plagioclase has been identified on this surface. Some small craters are observed on the eastern edge of the interior. Notably, there is no central peak complex, with only a small hill present at the midpoint.

== Satellite craters ==
By convention these features are identified on lunar maps by placing the letter on the side of the crater midpoint that is closest to Sommerfeld.

Sommerfeld	Latitude	Longitude	Diameter
N	62.3° N	162.2° W	39 km
V	66.9° N	170.3° W	32 km
