= Guericke (crater) =

Crater on the Moon

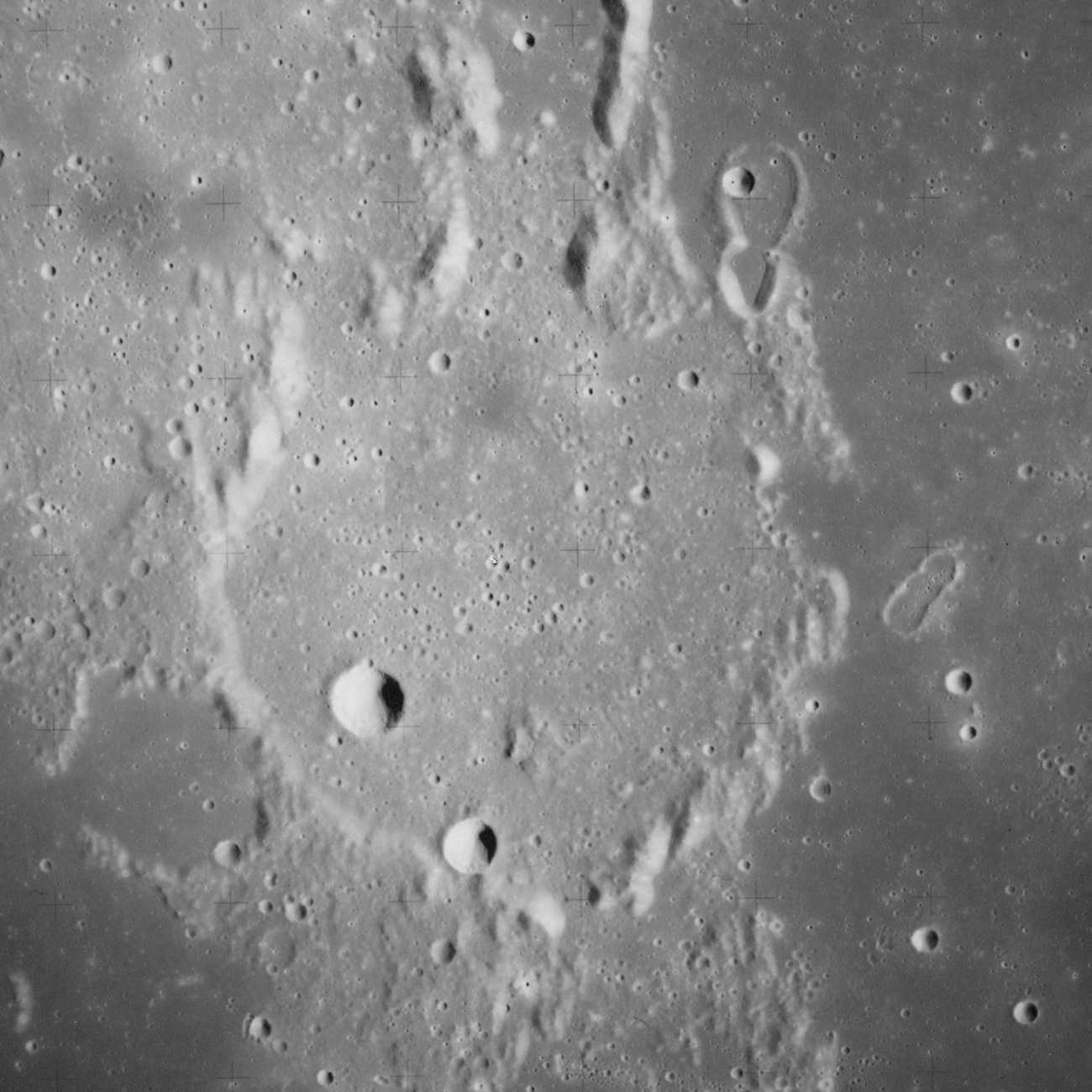
- Apollo 16 mapping camera image
- Coordinates: 11.5°S 14.1°W
- Diameter: 61 km
- Depth: 0.74 km
- Colongitude: 14° at sunrise
- Eponym: Otto von Guericke

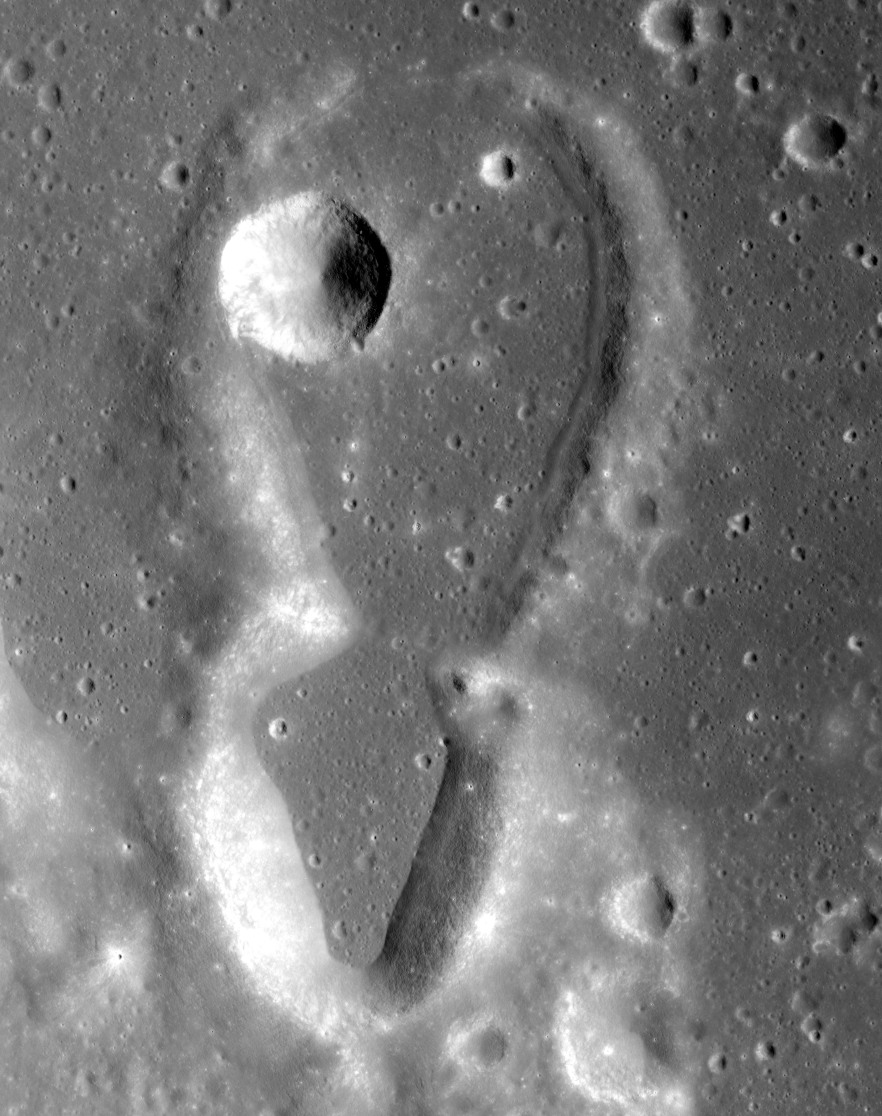
Guericke S and J craters. This 18-km-long "figure 8" pair of noncircular craters probably was not formed by hypervelocity impacts of bodies from space. It could be a secondary impact feature formed by projectiles from the Imbrium basin 700 km to the north. The terrace at the base of the crater walls could be debris from the walls or a "bathtub ring" left by a formerly higher stand of the mare fill. Alternatively, the crater pair and the terrace could have been formed by volcanic eruptions. The superposed bright crater is younger than and unrelated to either the "figure 8" pair or the mare. (NASA image and caption)

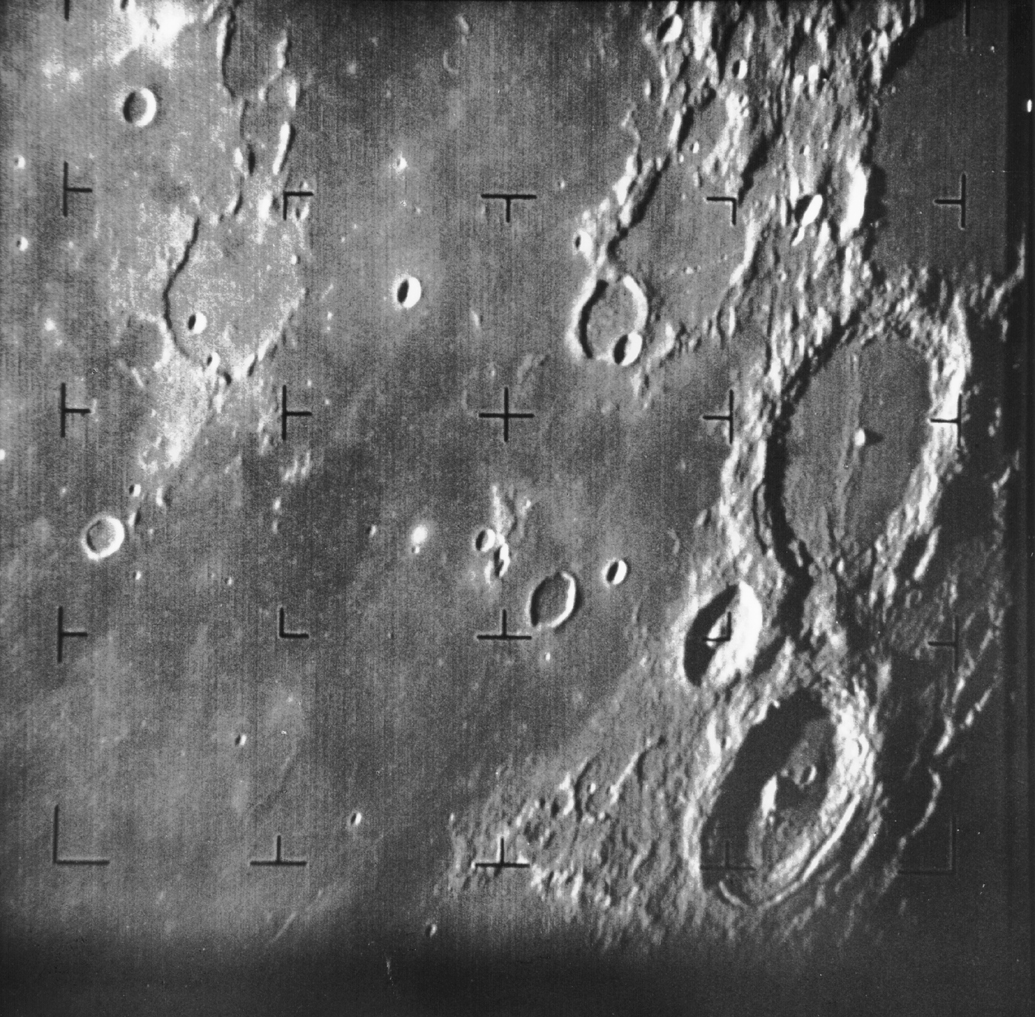
Guericke is in upper left in this image acquired by Ranger 7, the first image of the moon by an American spacecraft. Alphonsus is at right center.

Guericke is the remnant of a lunar impact crater at the north part of the Mare Nubium. It is named after German scientist Otto von Guericke. To the north-northwest lies the large Fra Mauro crater, along with the co-joined craters Parry and Bonpland. To the east are the craters Kundt and Davy.

The surviving rim of Guericke has been worn, battered, and partly submerged by the basaltic lava that covers the floor. The wall is now little more than a circular series of ridges that join with rises that flow to the north, northwest, and south. The flooded crater remnant Guericke F is attached to the southwest exterior. The interior flood has a few small rises in the otherwise nearly flat surface. Two craters (Guericke D and H) mark the floor in the southwest quadrant.

== Satellite craters ==
By convention these features are identified on lunar maps by placing the letter on the side of the crater midpoint that is closest to Guericke.

Guericke	Latitude	Longitude	Diameter
A	11.1° S	17.3° W	5 km
B	14.5° S	15.3° W	16 km
D	12.0° S	14.6° W	8 km
E	10.0° S	12.0° W	4 km
F	12.2° S	15.3° W	21 km
G	14.0° S	15.0° W	5 km
H	12.4° S	14.2° W	6 km
J	10.6° S	13.4° W	8 km
K	15.1° S	13.3° W	3 km
M	12.9° S	12.5° W	2 km
N	12.5° S	9.9° W	3 km
P	15.0° S	14.6° W	3 km
S	10.3° S	13.3° W	11 km

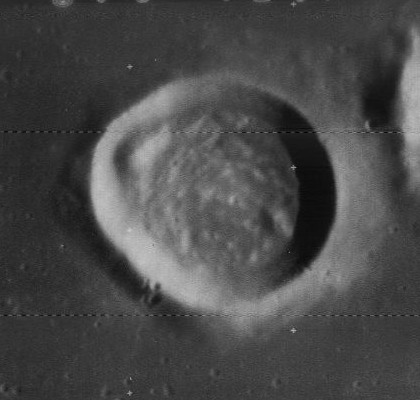
Guericke B from Lunar Orbiter 4

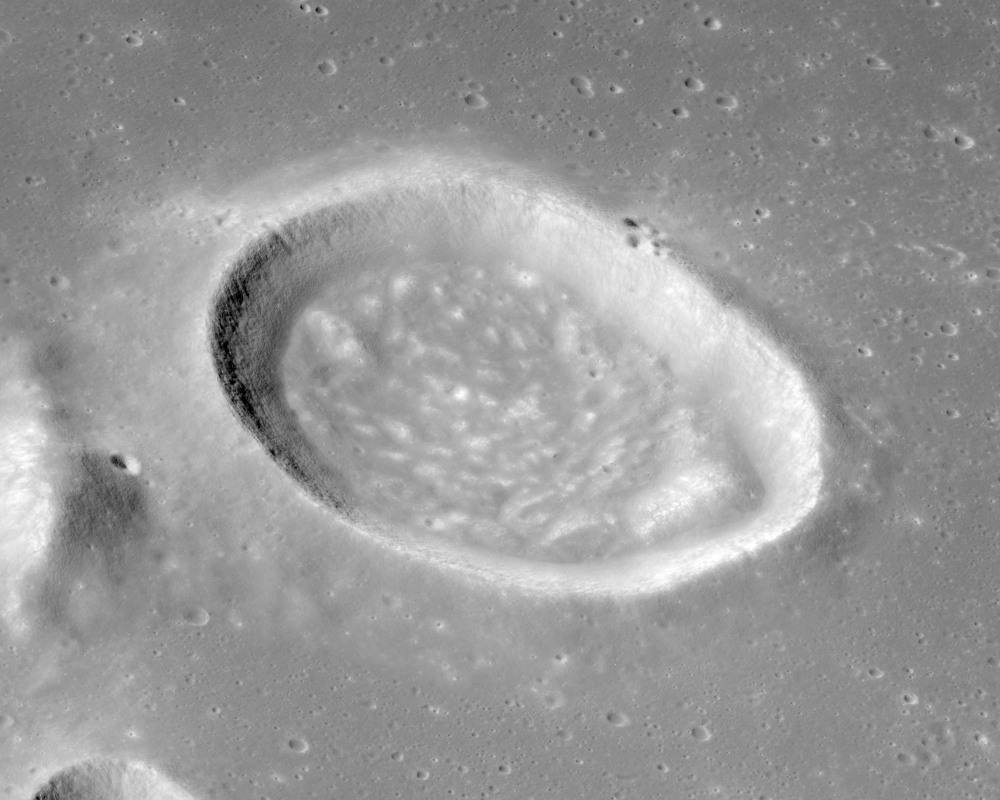
Guericke B from Apollo 16

The following craters have been renamed by the IAU.

- Guericke C — See Kundt.
