= Fra Mauro (disambiguation) =

Fra Mauro may refer to:

- Fra Mauro (crater), a crater on the Moon
- Fra Mauro formation, landing site of Apollo 14, named after Fra Mauro crater
- Fra Mauro, the 15th-century Venetian cartographer

== See also ==
- Fra Mauro map, a map made around 1450 by the cartographer, showing the Old World
