= Kundt (crater) =

Crater on the Moon

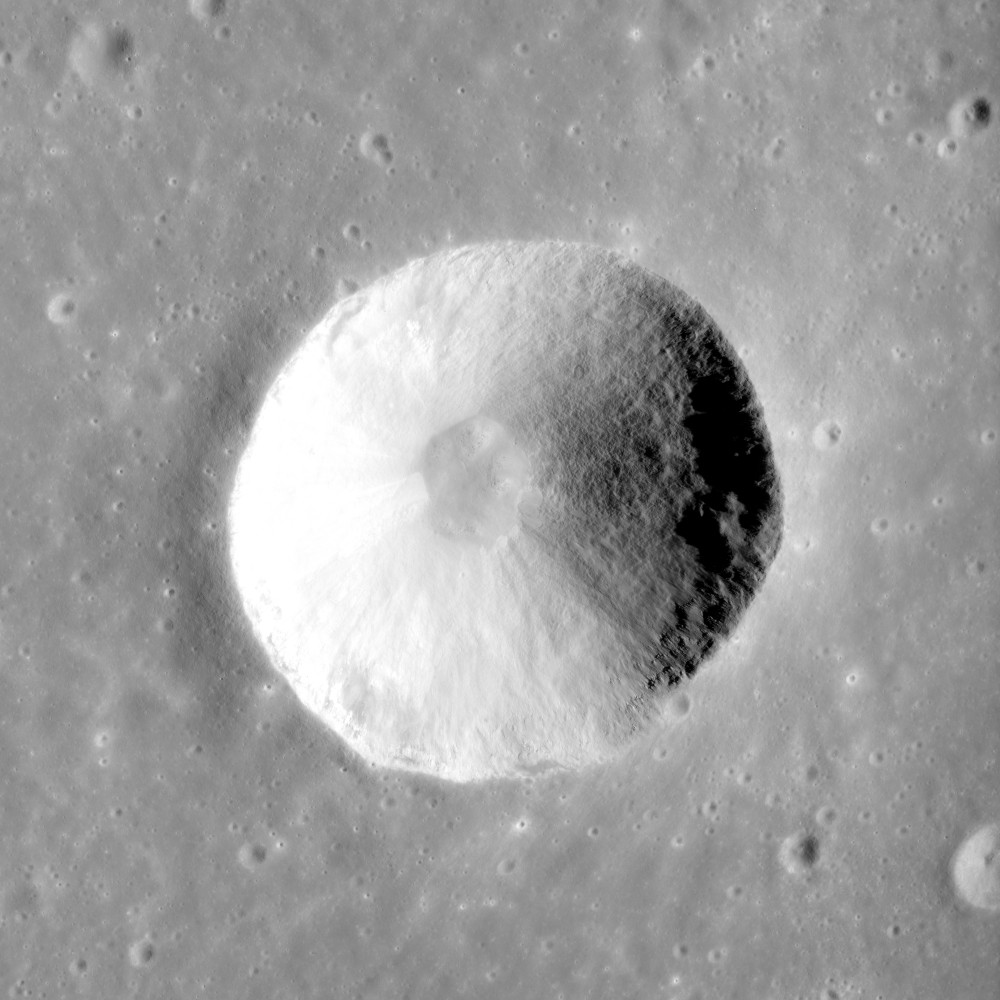
- Apollo 16 image
- Coordinates: 11.5°S 11.5°W
- Diameter: 15 km
- Depth: 1.96 km
- Colongitude: 12° at sunrise
- Eponym: August Kundt

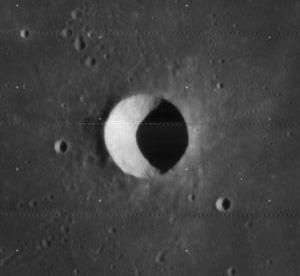
Lunar Orbiter 4 image

Kundt is a small, bowl-shaped lunar impact crater in the northern section of the Mare Nubium. It was named after the German physicist August Kundt. Prior to that it was designated Guericke C. It has a raised rim and is not significantly worn due to impact erosion. This crater lies part way between Guericke to the west and Davy in the east.

== Kundt during full moon ==
During full moon, Kundt is an easy to detect telescopic target due to its bright white looking inner slopes. The floor looks dark, which gives the impression as if Kundt is a staring eye with white iris and black pupil. Kundt's brightness is also noticeable on the photographic version of chart LAC 76 (page 152) in The Clementine Atlas of the Moon (Ben Bussey / Paul D. Spudis).
