= Parry (crater) =

Lunar impact crater

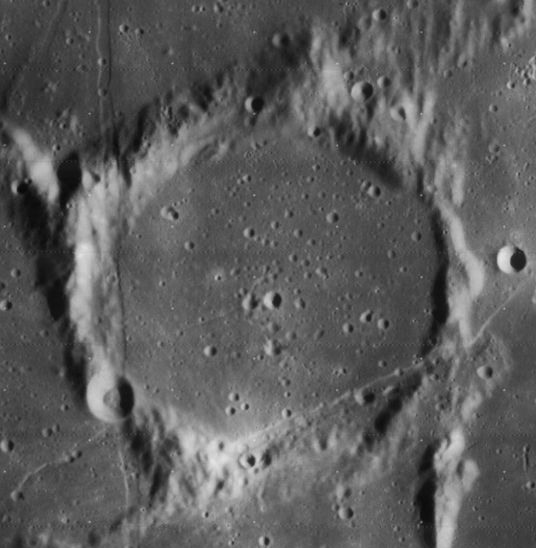
- Lunar Orbiter 4 image
- Coordinates: 7.9°S 15.8°W
- Diameter: 47.28 km
- Depth: 0.87 km
- Colongitude: 16° at sunrise
- Eponym: William Parry

Parry is a lunar impact crater that is attached to the southeast rim of the walled plain named Fra Mauro. Attached to the west and southwest rim of Parry is the crater Bonpland. Due south of Parry is the small crater Tolansky, and farther to the south-southwest is Guericke.

The rim of Parry is heavily worn and slightly distorted due to the co-joined formations. The wall is the most prominent along the northwest, and crossed along the southwest by the small Parry B. The floor has been flooded by lava, and is relatively flat. At the midpoint is a pair of small craters.

This crater was named after British explorer William Parry (1790–1855). The designation was formally adopted into lunar nomenclature by the International Astronomical Union in 1935.

A rille system, called the Rimae Parry, crosses the region in a series of graben. One rille crosses the southeast rim of Parry in a northeast direction before crossing the east rim and continuing a short distance across the surrounding mare. Another extends from Tolansky crater across the west side of Parry and into Fra Mauro crater. One other crosses the north rim of Bonpland crater and into Fra Mauro where it intersects with another rille.

== Parry during full moon ==
As with its neighbours Bonpland and Fra Mauro, crater Parry is hard to detect during full moon. The bright officially unnamed ray craterlet at the southern part of Parry's rim is a handy tool to find Parry. The brightness of Parry's ray craterlet is also noticeable on the photographic version of chart LAC 76 (page 152) in The Clementine Atlas of the Moon (Ben Bussey / Paul D. Spudis).

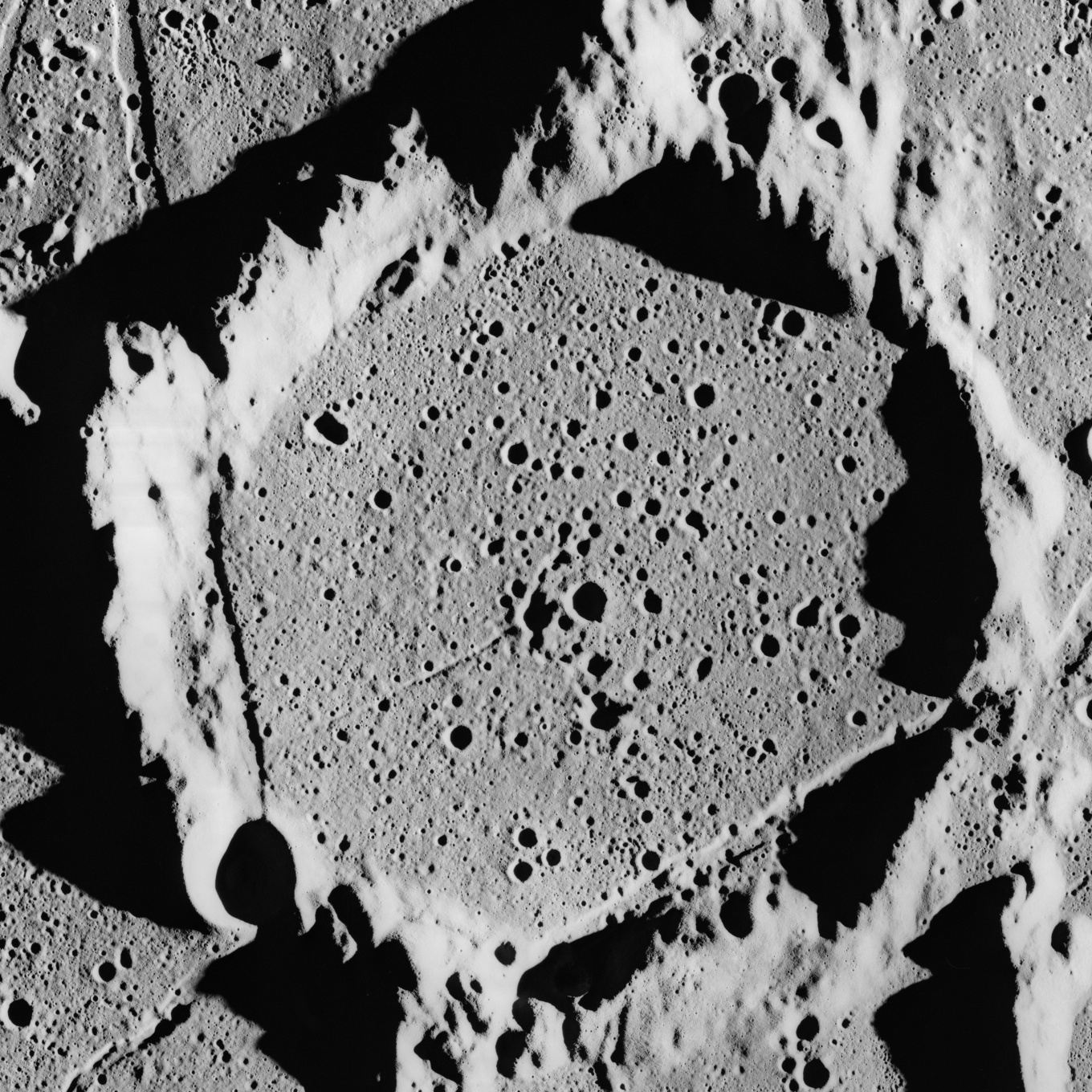

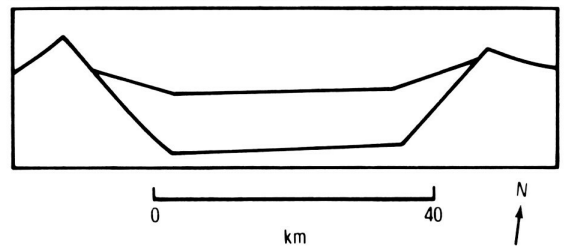
A patch of the Cayley Formation occupies the bottom of Parry crater, with its surface in the form of a subdued depression.

== Satellite craters ==
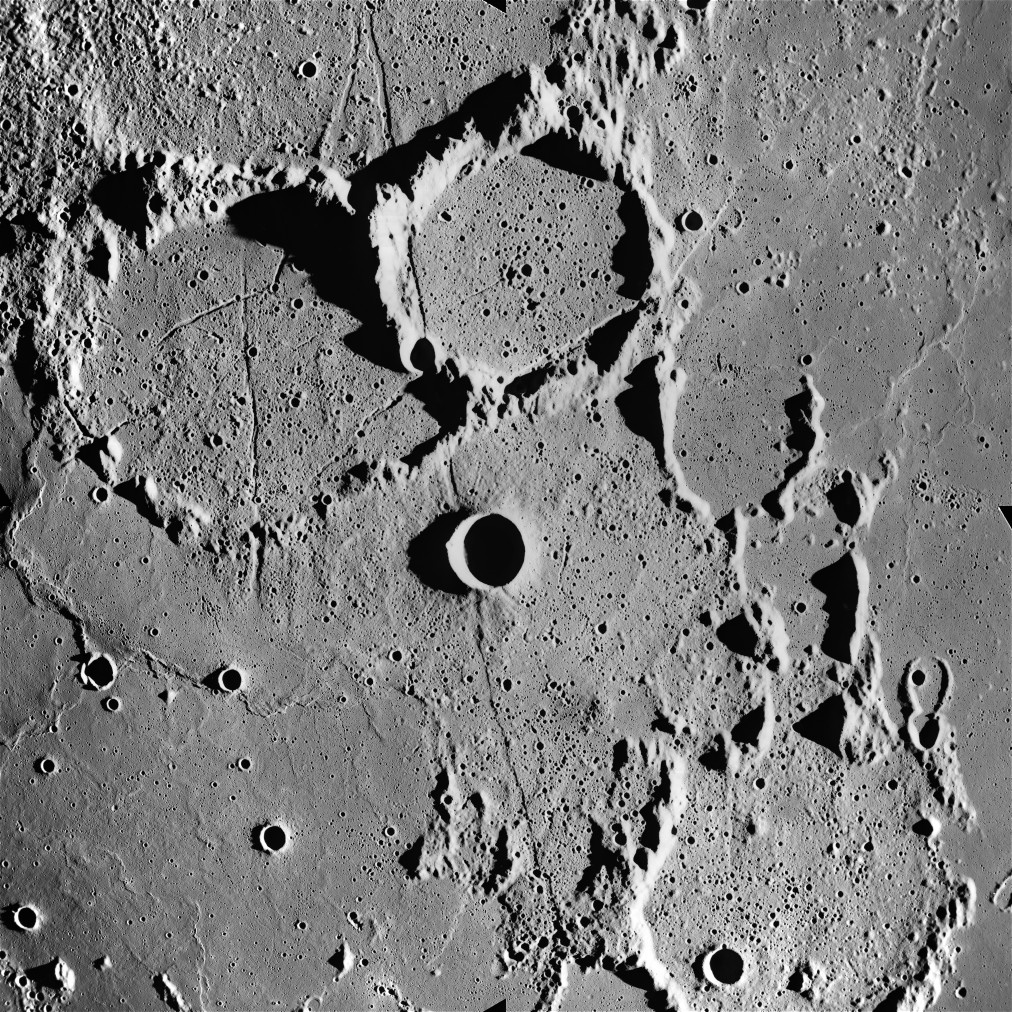
Parry (top center) from Apollo 16

By convention these features are identified on lunar maps by placing the letter on the side of the crater midpoint that is closest to Parry.

Parry	Latitude	Longitude	Diameter
B	8.9° S	13.0° W	1 km
C	6.8° S	12.7° W	3 km
D	7.9° S	15.7° W	3 km
E	8.3° S	16.3° W	6 km
F	7.6° S	14.7° W	4 km
L	6.3° S	14.7° W	7 km
M	8.9° S	14.5° W	26 km

The following craters have been renamed by the IAU.

- Parry A — See Tolansky (crater).
