= Bonpland (crater) =

Lunar impact crater

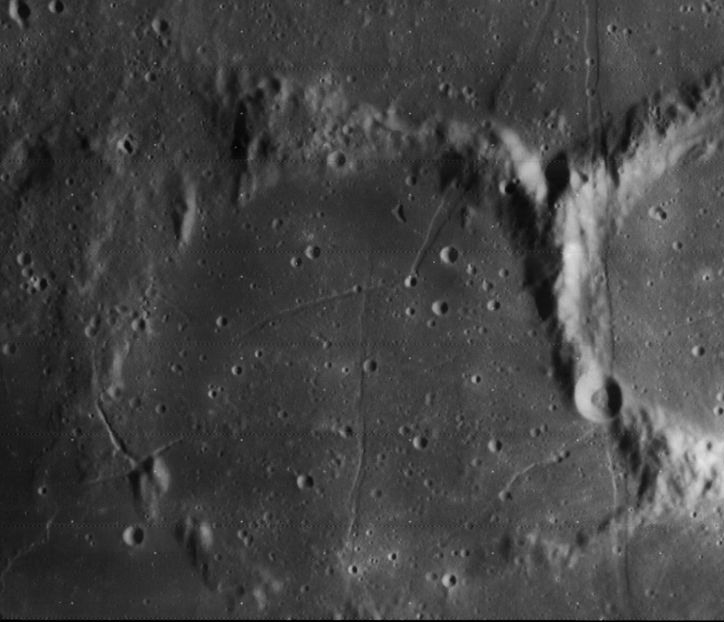
- Lunar Orbiter 4 image
- Coordinates: 8.3°S 17.4°W
- Diameter: 59.25 km (36.82 mi)
- Depth: 0.73 km (0.45 mi)
- Colongitude: 17° at sunrise
- Eponym: Aimé Bonpland

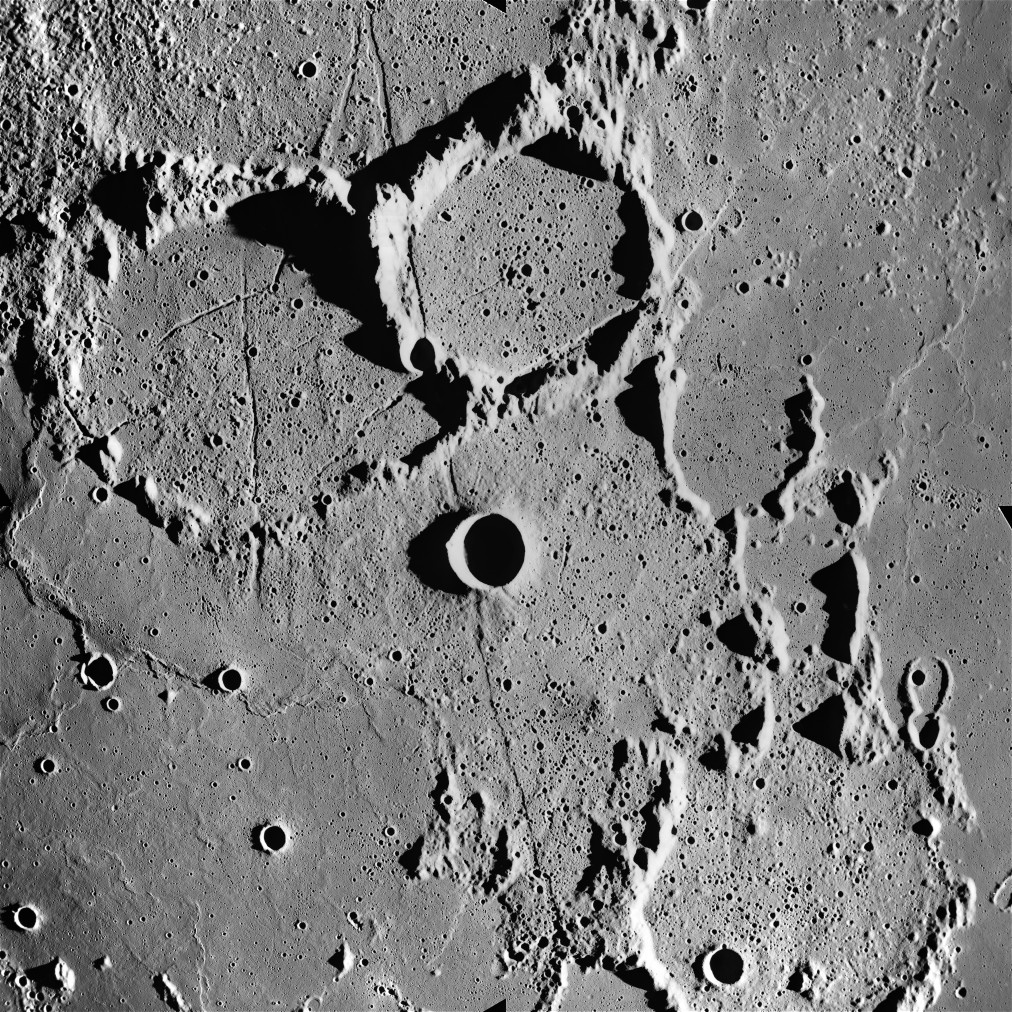
Bonpland (left side above center) from Apollo 16. NASA photo.

Bonpland is the remains of a lunar impact crater that is attached to the walled plain called Fra Mauro to the north and Parry to the east. The intersection of their rims forms a three-pointed mountainous rise. To the southeast is the small crater Tolansky. Bonpland lies on the eastern edge of Mare Cognitum.

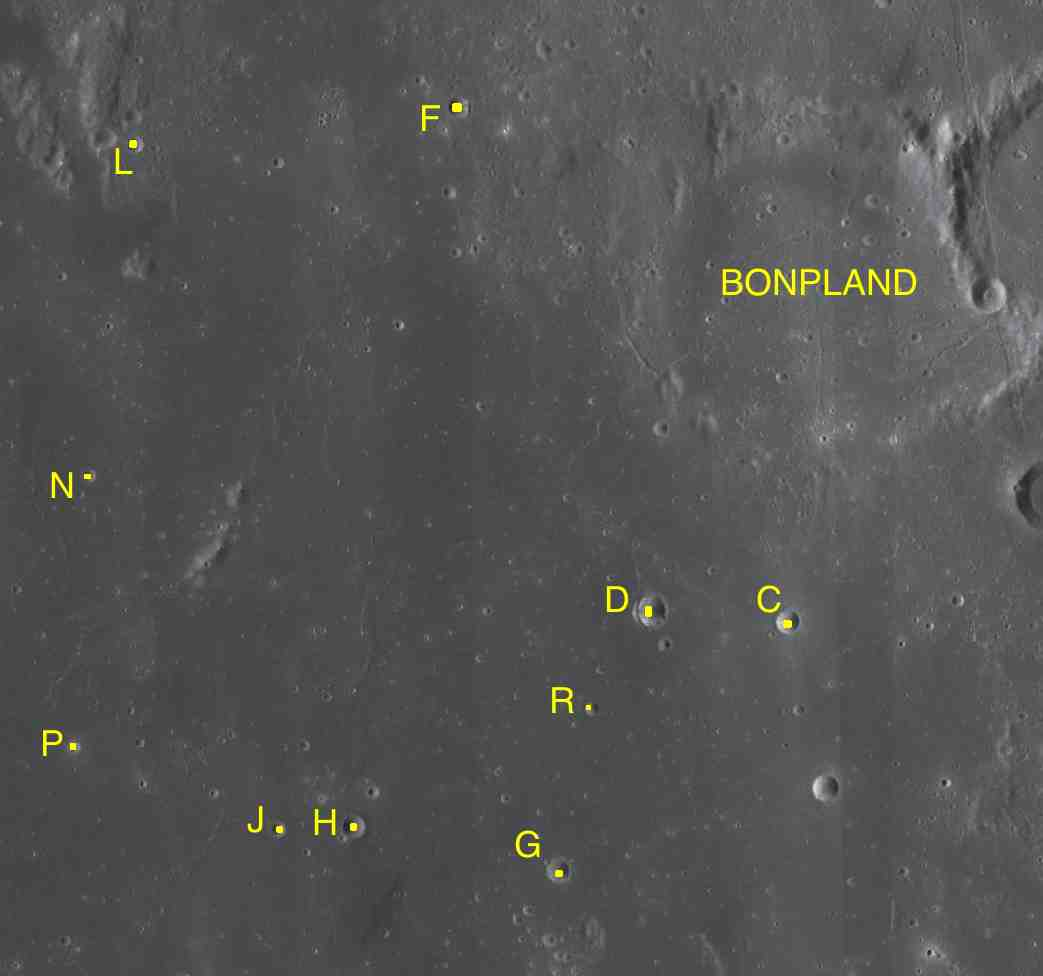
Bonpland and its satellite craters

This rim of Bonpland is heavily worn and eroded, with the intrusion of Parry in the east creating a bulging extension to the southeast. The floor has been flooded by lava in the past, leaving a relatively flat surface that is broken by a series of narrow clefts. These are collectively designated the Rimae Parry. The clefts cross the rim to the south and also to the north, with Rima Parry V extending into the neighboring Fra Mauro. There is a volcanic cone associated with the latter cleft.

This crater is named after Aimé Bonpland (1773-1858), a French explorer and botanist. His name was incorporated into lunar nomenclature by German astronomer J. H. von Mädler by 1837. Its designation was officially adopted by the International Astronomical Union in 1935.

== Satellite craters ==
By convention these features are identified on lunar maps by placing the letter on the side of the crater midpoint that is closest to Bonpland.

Bonpland	Latitude	Longitude	Diameter
C	10.2° S	17.4° W	4 km
D	10.1° S	18.2° W	6 km
F	7.3° S	19.3° W	4 km
G	11.6° S	18.8° W	4 km
H	11.4° S	19.9° W	4 km
J	11.4° S	20.4° W	3 km
L	7.5° S	21.2° W	3 km
N	9.4° S	21.4° W	3 km
P	10.9° S	21.5° W	1 km
R	10.7° S	18.6° W	3 km

The following craters have been renamed by the IAU.

- Bonpland E — See Kuiper (lunar crater).
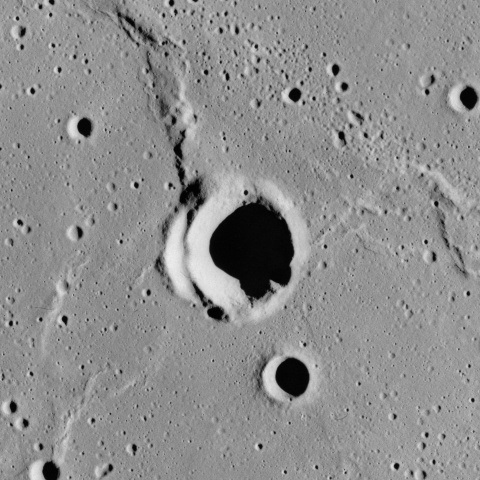
Faulted crater Bonpland D
