= Tolansky (crater) =

Crater on the Moon

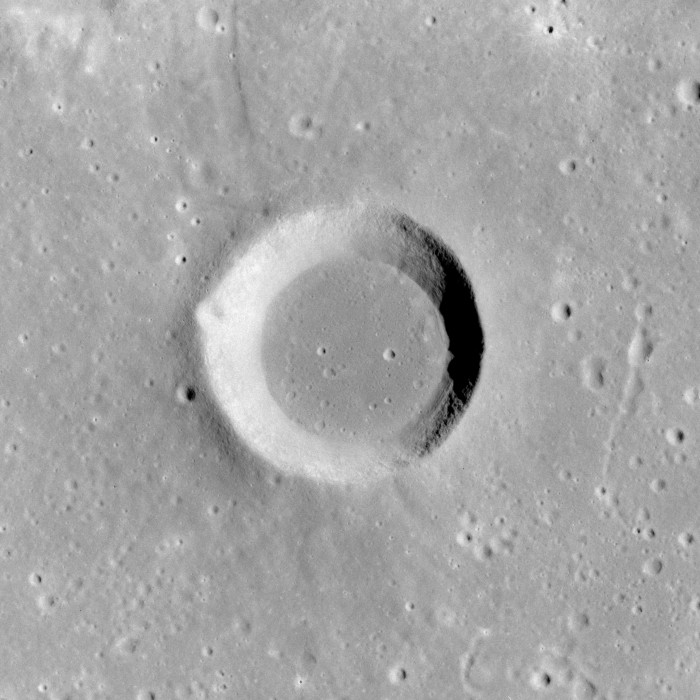
- Apollo 16 image
- Coordinates: 9.52°S 15.98°W
- Diameter: 13.03 km (8.10 mi)
- Depth: 0.9 km
- Colongitude: 16° at sunrise
- Eponym: Samuel Tolansky

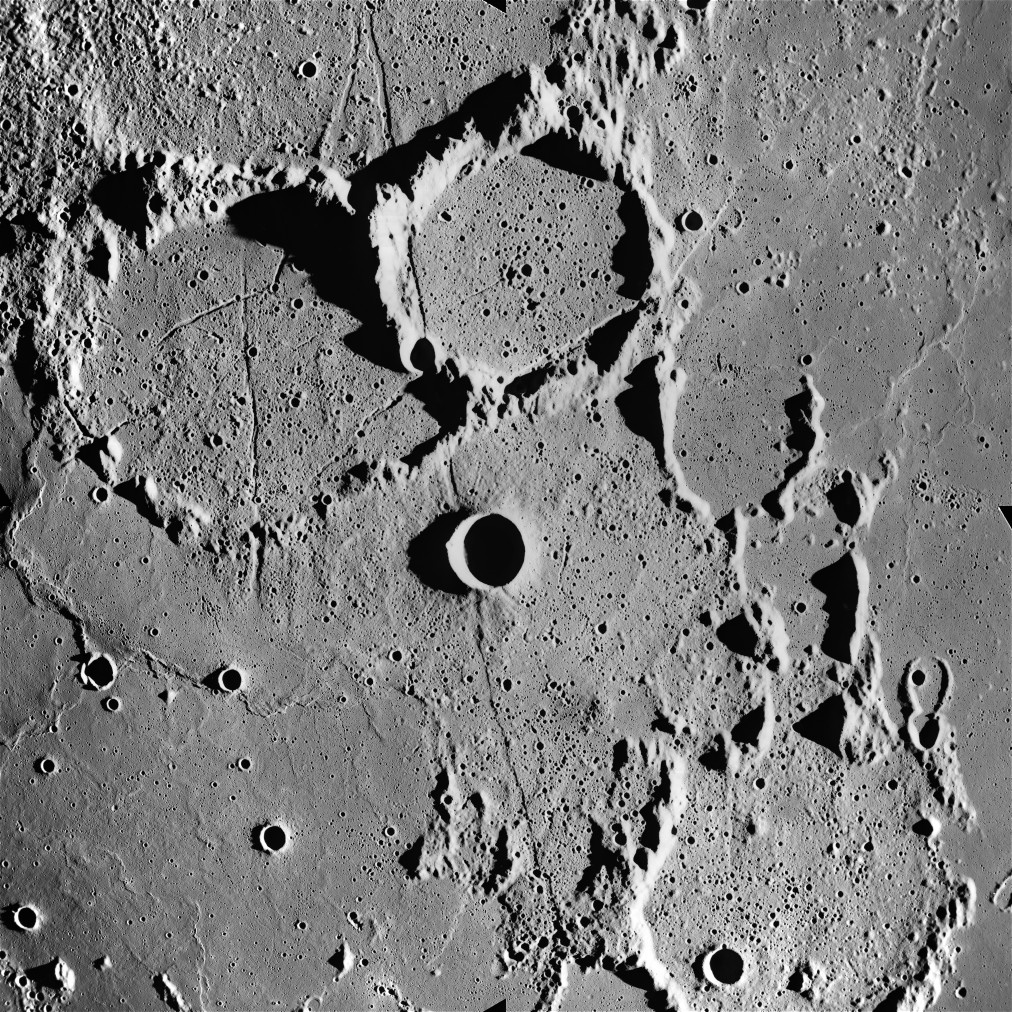
Tolansky is at center. From Apollo 16. NASA image.

Tolansky is a small, circular lunar impact crater that is located due south of the crater Parry on the Mare Cognitum. The formation is symmetric, with a light-hued outer rim and a darker interior floor. A rille belonging to the Rimae Parry almost connects with the north-northwestern rim of Tolansky.

It was named after British physicist Samuel Tolansky. It was formerly known as Parry A, prior to its current name being approved by the IAU in 1976.
