= Davy (crater) =

Crater on the Moon

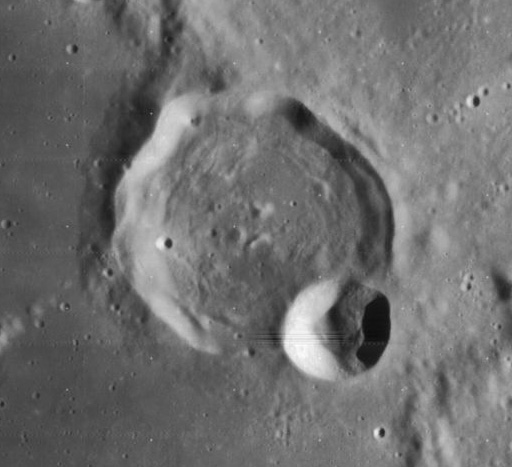
- Lunar Orbiter 4 image
- Coordinates: 11.85°S 8.15°W
- Diameter: 33.94 km (21.09 mi)
- Depth: 1.4 km (0.87 mi)
- Colongitude: 8° at sunrise
- Eponym: Humphry Davy

Davy is a small lunar impact crater that is located on the eastern edge of the Mare Nubium. It overlies the basaltic lava-flooded remains of the satellite crater Davy Y to the east, a formation which contains a crater chain designated Catena Davy. To the southeast of Davy is the prominent crater Alphonsus.

The outer rim of Davy is low, and the interior is mostly covered by material that has slumped down the walls. It is a floor-fractured crater, although the fractures are fairly subdued. The perimeter is somewhat polygonal in shape, especially in the western half, and the southeast rim has been overlain by Davy A. The latter is bowl-shaped with a notch in the northern rim. The interior of Davy lacks a central peak, although there are some low central mounds and the rim of Davy Y forms a low ridge leading from the northern outer rim.

This crater is named after British physicist Humphry Davy (1778-1829). His name was introduced with the lunar nomenclature of German astronomer Johann H. von Mädler during the 19th century. Its designation was officially adopted in 1935 by the International Astronomical Union.

== Catena Davy ==
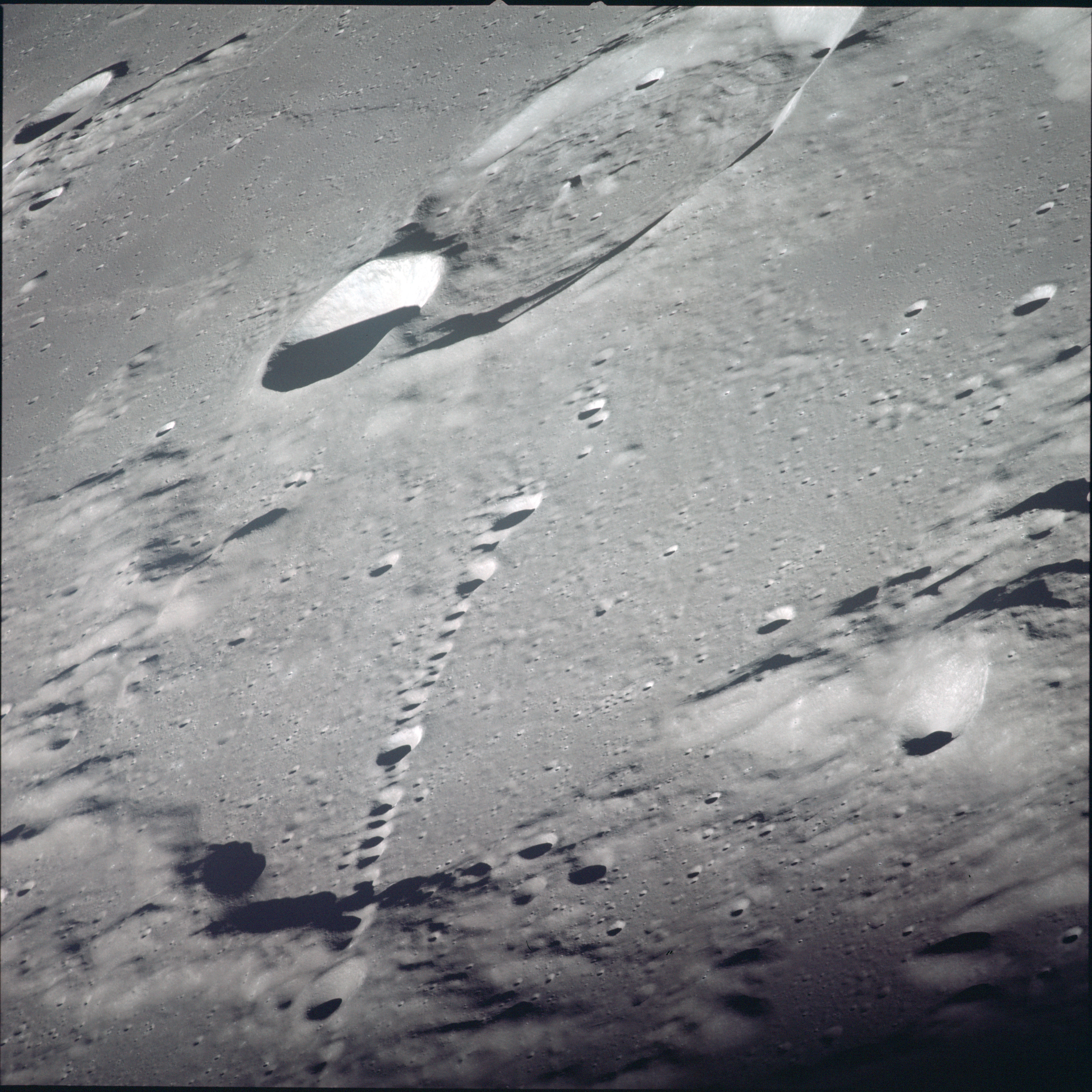
Lunar crater Davy at top and Catena Davy below, as seen from Apollo 12. NASA photo.

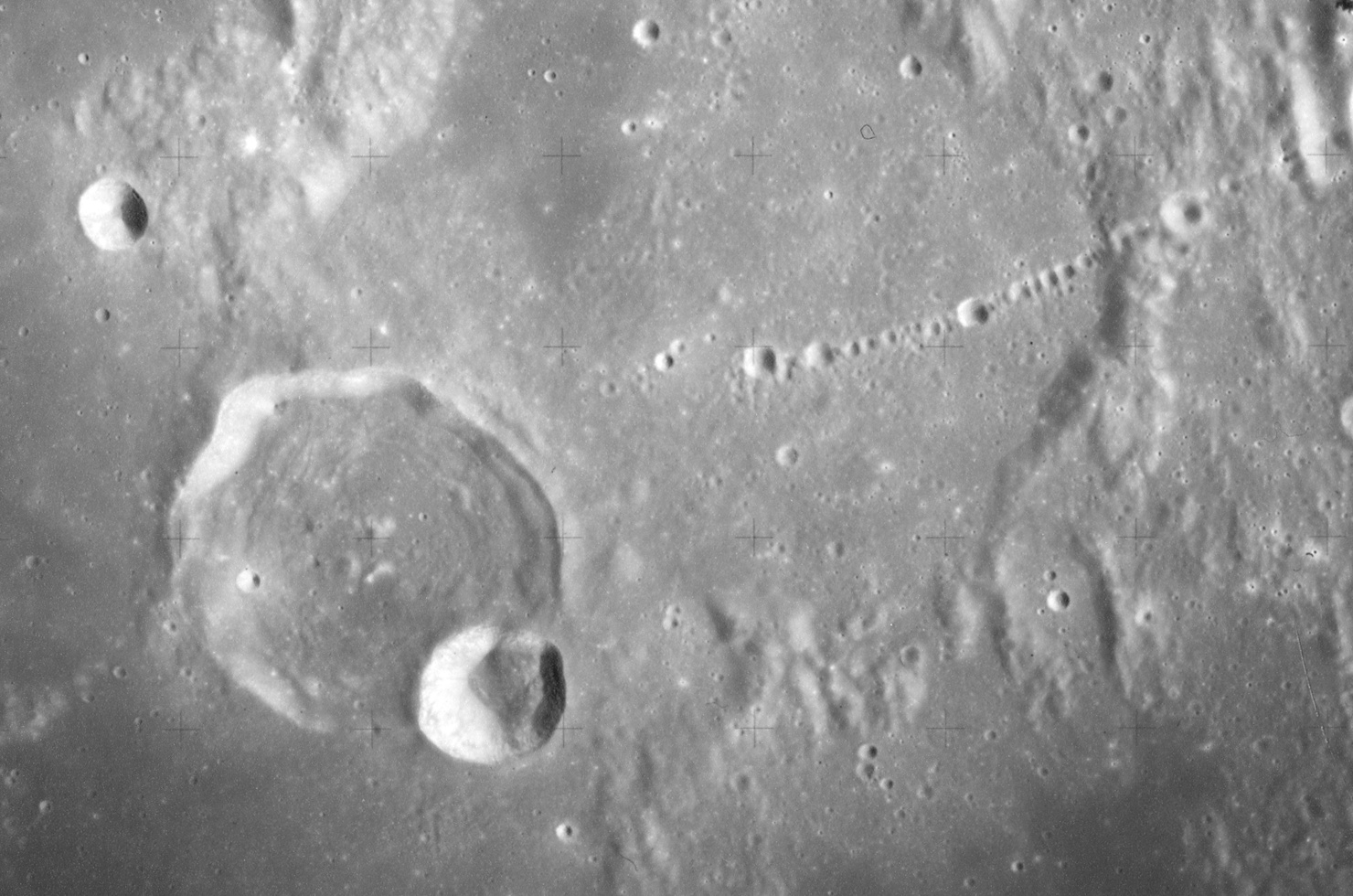
Davy crater and Catena Davy from Apollo 16

This linear string of 23 tiny craters runs from the midpoint of Davy Y towards the walled basin Ptolemaeus, following a slightly curving course to the east-northeast until it reaches Davy G. It is located at selenographic coordinates 11.0° S, 7.0° W, and has a length of 50 km.

This formation is not believed to be due to secondary cratering because it is not radial to a suitable source crater. The most likely cause is believed to be a single body that broke apart prior to impact due to tidal effects. High resolution images have demonstrated that the craters formed at about the same time since the ejecta from each crater does not overlay neighboring craters. However, there are still some scientists who believe that this chain of craters may be volcanic in origin.

In 1974, six of the craters in the chain were given "unofficial" names for use in connection with NASA's Topophotomap 77D1S1(10). These names, listed below, were later adopted by the IAU. Their positions in the chain are not readily distinguished based on their official coordinates, but they are well identified on the topophotomap.

Crater	Coordinates	Diameter	Name source
Alan	10.9°S 6.1°W	2.0 km	Irish masculine name
Delia	10.9°S 6.1°W	2.0 km	Greek feminine name
Harold	10.9°S 6.0°W	2.0 km	Scandinavian masculine name
Osman	11.0°S 6.2°W	2.0 km	Turkish masculine name
Priscilla	10.9°S 6.2°W	1.8 km	Latin feminine name
Susan	11.0°S 6.3°W	1.0 km	English feminine name

Catena Davy was considered as a possible early Apollo landing site.

== Davy G and Catena Davy during full moon ==
As seen during full moon, the bright satellite crater Davy G is a guide to find the vaguely discernible arc of Catena Davy. The brightness of Davy G, and the arc of Catena Davy west-southwest of Davy G, are also noticeable on the photographic version of chart LAC 77 (page 154) in The Clementine Atlas of the Moon (Ben Bussey / Paul D. Spudis).

== Satellite craters ==
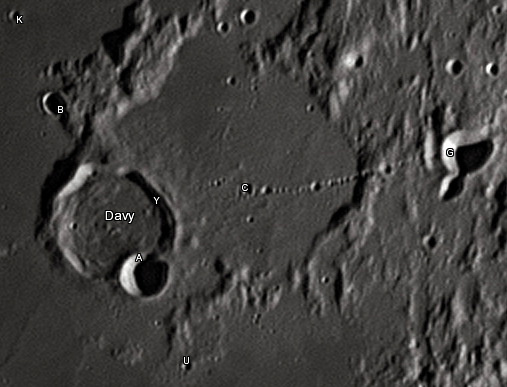
Davy crater and its satellite craters as seen from Earth

By convention these features are identified on lunar maps by placing the letter on the side of the crater midpoint that is closest to Davy.

Davy	Latitude	Longitude	Diameter
A	12.2° S	7.7° W	15 km
B	10.8° S	8.9° W	7 km
C	11.2° S	7.0° W	3 km
G	10.4° S	5.1° W	16 km
K	10.2° S	9.5° W	3 km
U	12.9° S	7.1° W	3 km
Y	11.0° S	7.1° W	70 km
