= Fra Mauro (crater) =

Crater on the Moon

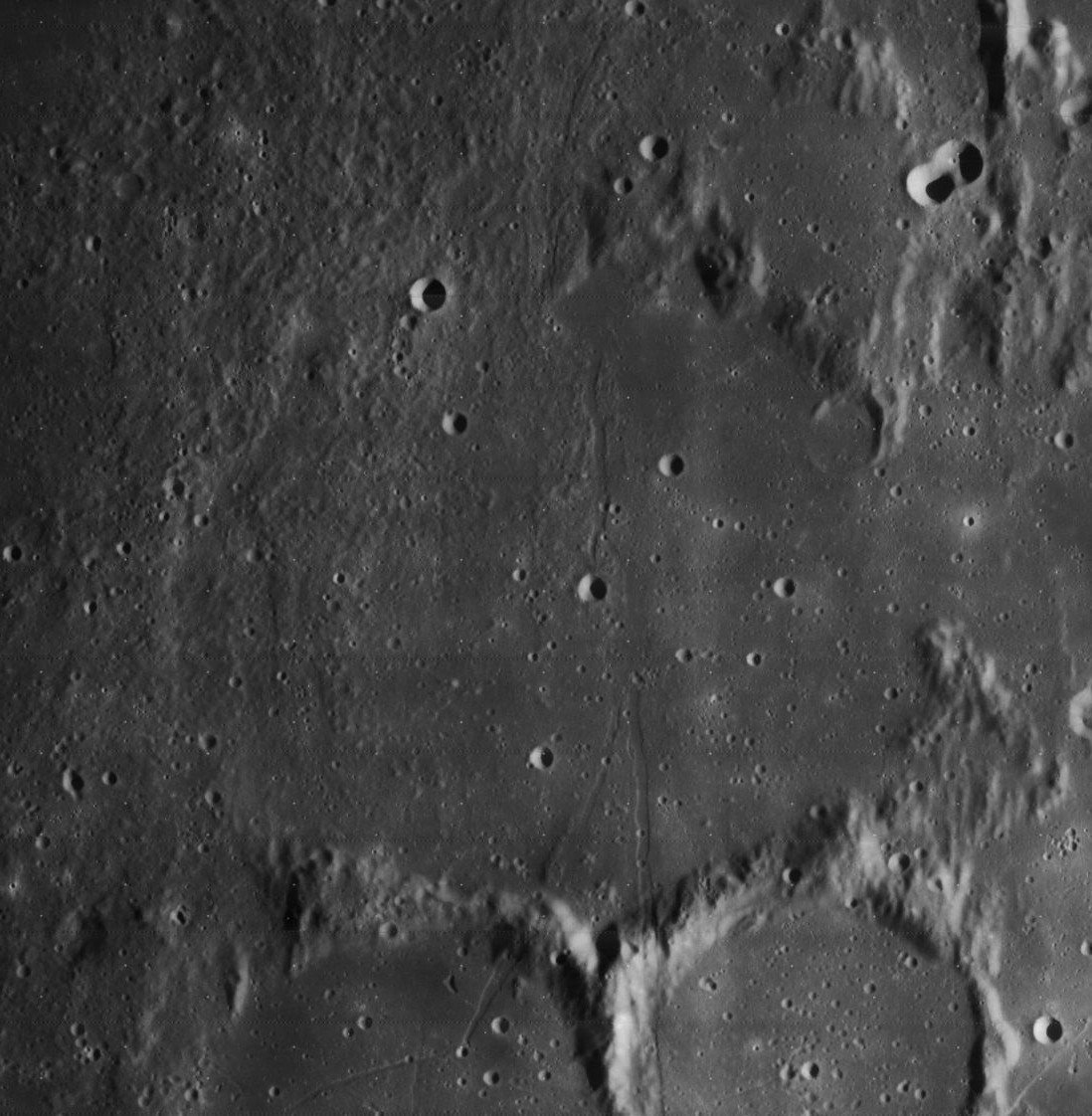
- Lunar Orbiter 4 image of Fra Mauro (center); Apollo 14 landing site is near center of top margin of image
- Coordinates: 6.0°S 17.0°W
- Diameter: 96.76 km (60.12 mi)
- Depth: None
- Colongitude: 17° at sunrise
- Formation: Pre-Nectarian
- Eponym: Fra Mauro

Fra Mauro is the worn remnant of a walled plain on the Moon. It is part of the surrounding Fra Mauro formation, being located to the northeast of Mare Cognitum and southeast of Mare Insularum. Attached to the southern rim are the co-joined craters Bonpland and Parry, which intrude into the formation forming inward-bulging walls.

On the lunar geologic timescale, this crater dates to the Pre-Nectarian epoch. The surviving rim of Fra Mauro is heavily worn, with incisions from past impacts and openings in the north and east walls. The rim is the most prominent in the southeast, where it shares a wall with Parry. The remainder consists of little more than low, irregular ridges. The maximum elevation of the outer rim is 0.7 km.

The floor of this formation has been resurfaced by basaltic lava. This surface is almost divided by clefts running from the north and south rims. There is no central peak, although the tiny crater Fra Mauro E lies at almost the midpoint of the formation.

This formation is named after Italian geographer Fra Mauro (unknown–1459). His name was incorporated into the lunar nomenclature of German astronomer Johann H. Mädler in 1837. Its designation was officially adopted by the International Astronomical Union in 1935.

== Apollo missions ==
The area north of Fra Mauro crater was the intended landing site of the ill-fated Apollo 13 mission, which was aborted after an oxygen tank aboard the spacecraft exploded. The crew later returned safely to Earth. The next mission, Apollo 14, landed in the highland region just to the north of Fra Mauro crater. The Apollo 14 crew (Alan Shepard and Edgar Mitchell) sampled breccia that had been deposited here by the Imbrium basin-forming impact, and which partly covers Fra Mauro. This rough debris blanket of ejecta is referred to as the "Fra Mauro Formation".

== Gallery ==
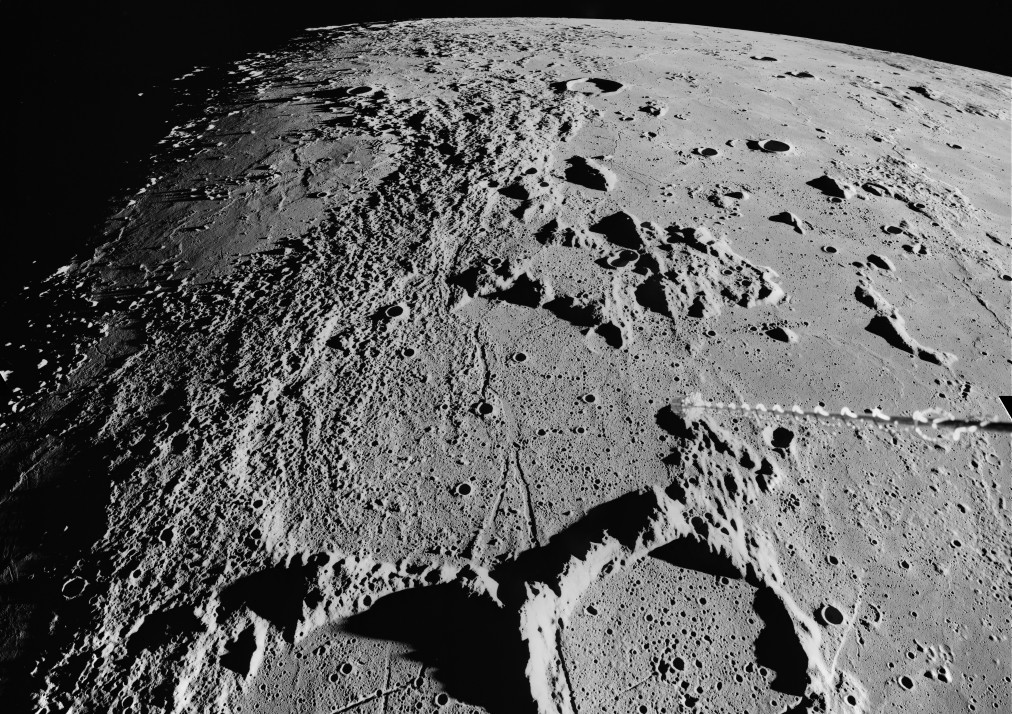
Oblique view from Apollo 16

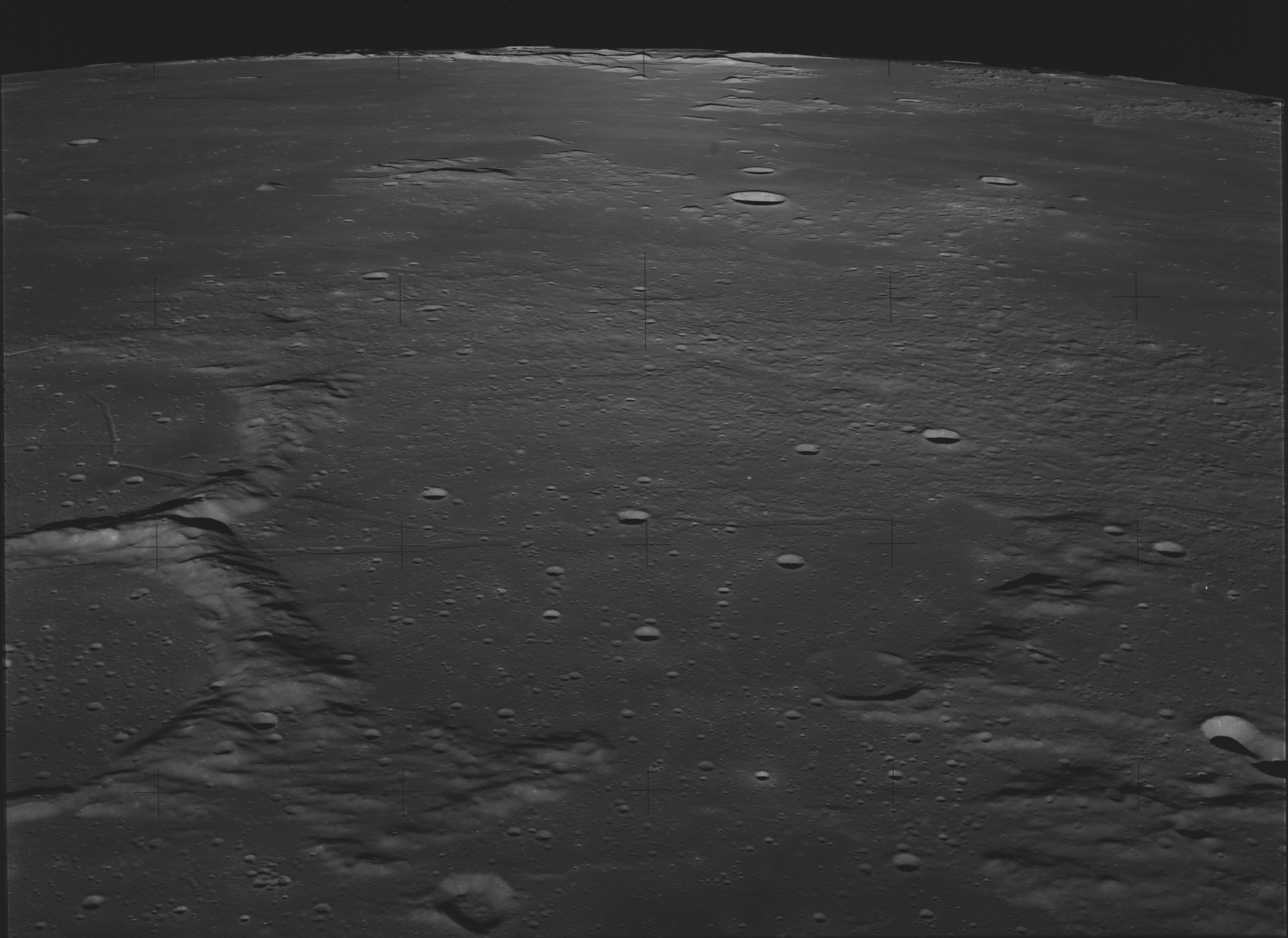
Fra Mauro crater from Apollo 14

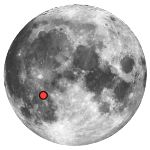
Location of the lunar crater Fra Mauro

== Satellite craters ==
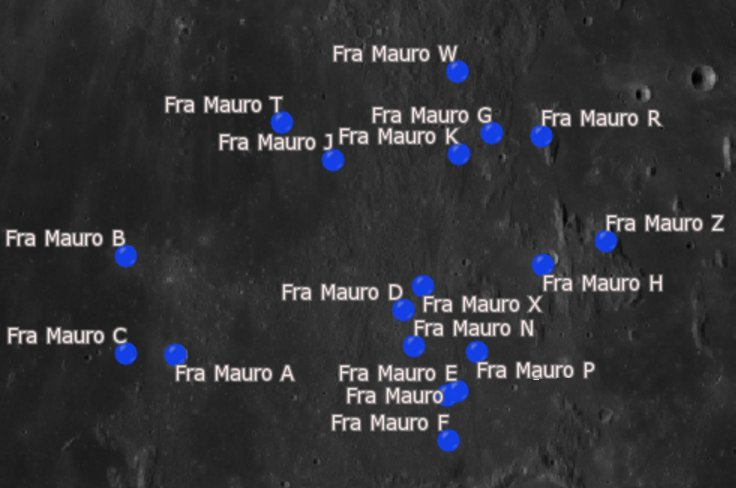
Fra Mauro and its satellite craters

By convention these features are identified on lunar maps by placing the letter on the side of the crater midpoint that is closest to Fra Mauro.

Fra Mauro	Latitude	Longitude	Diameter
A	5.4° S	20.9° W	9 km
B	4.0° S	21.7° W	7 km
C	5.4° S	21.6° W	7 km
D	4.8° S	17.6° W	5 km
E	6.0° S	16.8° W	4 km
F	6.7° S	16.9° W	3 km
G	2.2° S	16.3° W	6 km
H	4.1° S	15.5° W	6 km
J	2.6° S	18.6° W	3 km
K	2.5° S	16.7° W	6 km
N	5.3° S	17.4° W	3 km
P	5.4° S	16.5° W	3 km
R	2.2° S	15.6° W	3 km
T	2.1° S	19.3° W	3 km
W	1.3° S	16.8° W	4 km
X	4.5° S	17.3° W	20 km
Y	4.1° S	16.7° W	4 km
Z	3.8° S	14.6° W	5 km

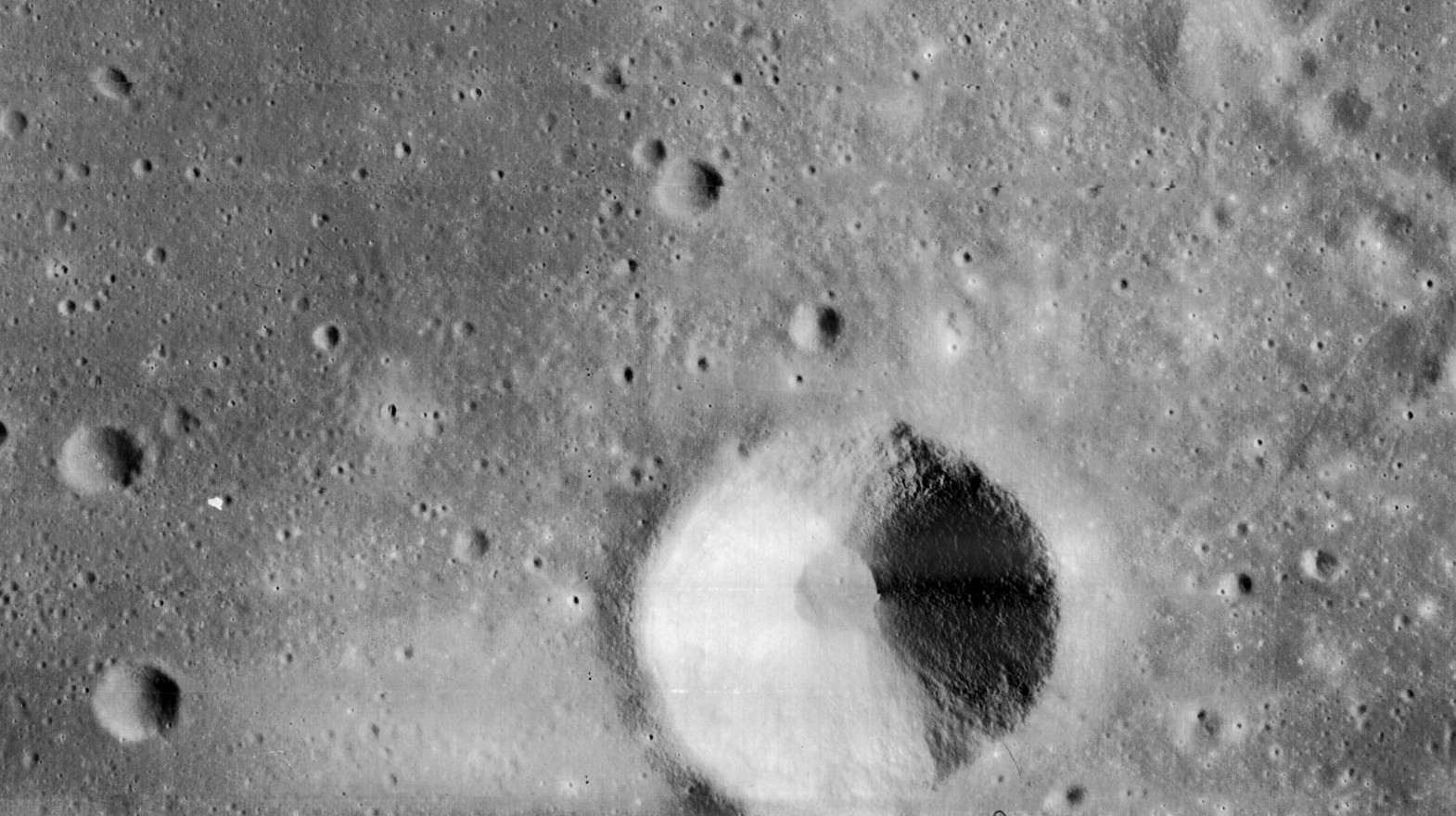
Fra Mauro B from Lunar Orbiter 1

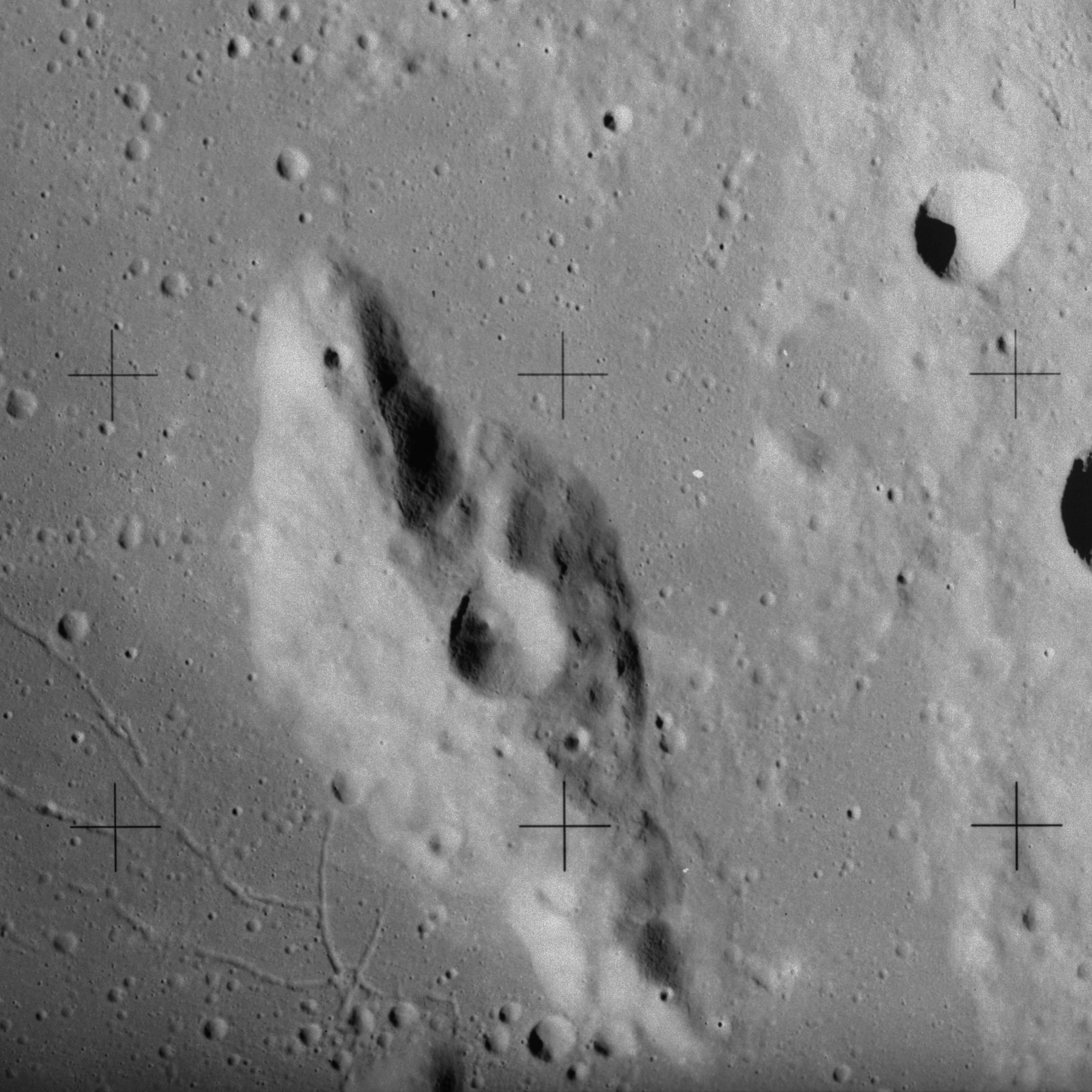
Fra Mauro R, from Apollo 14

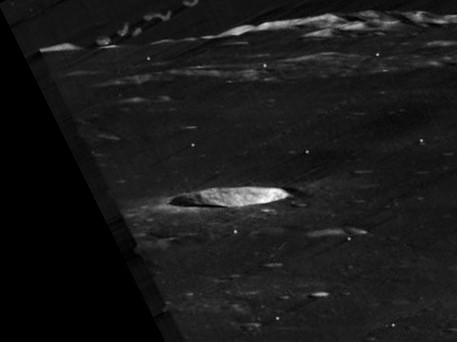
Oblique view of Fra Mauro T, from Lunar Orbiter 3
