= Briggs (crater) =

Crater on the Moon

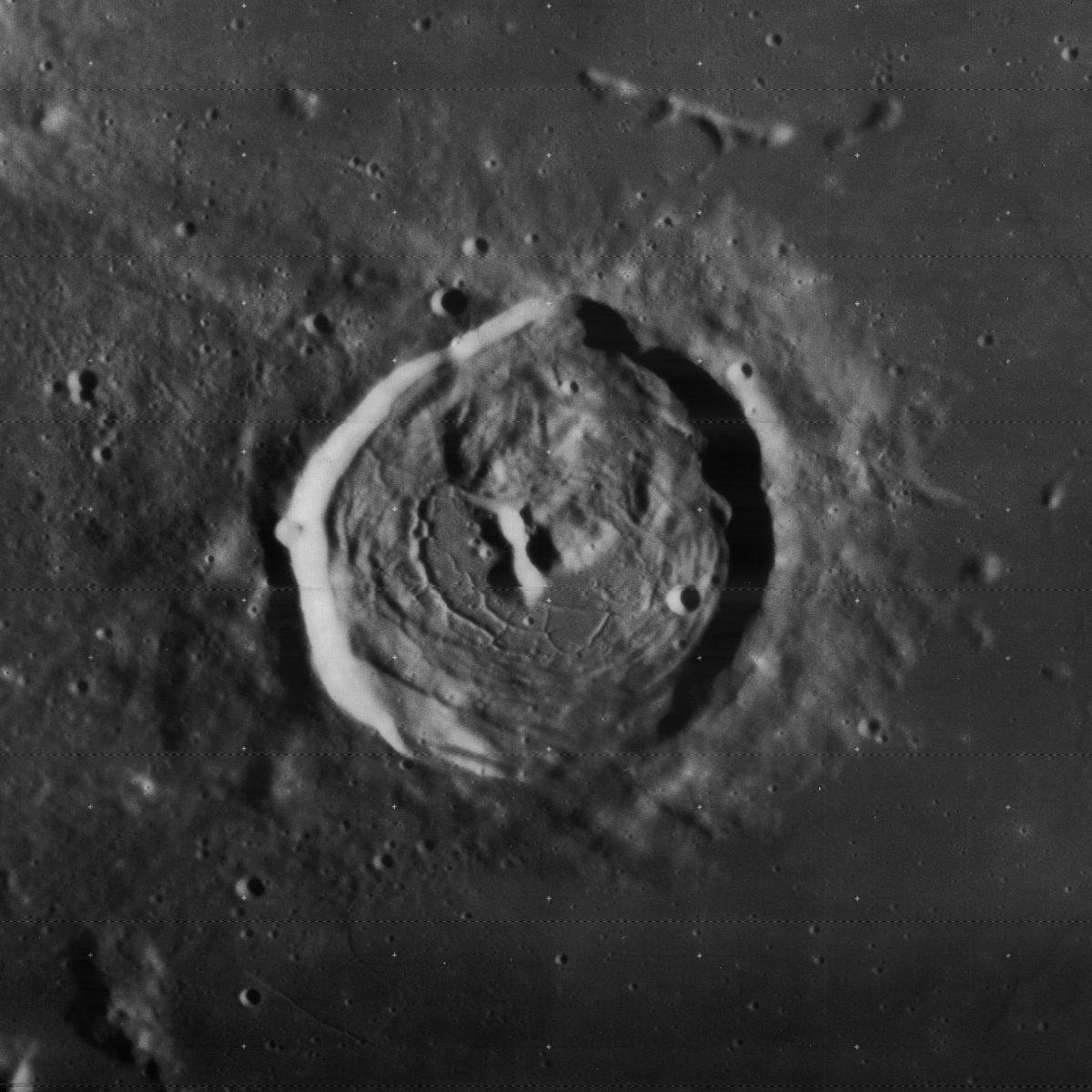
- Lunar Orbiter 4 image
- Coordinates: 26.5°N 69.1°W
- Diameter: 36.75 km (22.84 mi)
- Depth: 1.2 km (0.75 mi)
- Colongitude: 70° at sunrise
- Formation: Late Imbrian
- Eponym: Henry Briggs

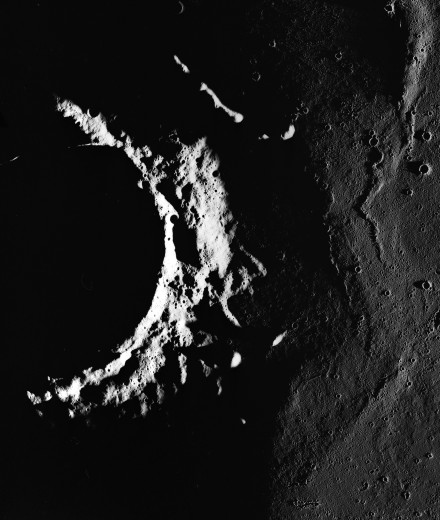
Briggs crater at the terminator, from Apollo 15

Briggs is a lunar impact crater that is located in the western part of the Oceanus Procellarum, to the east of the large walled plain called Struve. It lies to the northeast of the walled plain Eddington, and north-northwest of the crater Seleucus. The isolated position of this crater on the mare, near the northwestern limb of the Moon, makes it relatively easy for an Earth-bound observer to locate.

This formation dates to the Late Imbrian period on the lunar geologic timescale. The outer rim of Briggs is not quite circular, with outward bulges to the north-northeast and southward. The interior floor is bulging upward, suggesting a subsurface uplift process. There are radial and concentric cracks, indicating a floor-fractured crater. At the midpoint of the crater floor is a central ridge, extending to the north. This spectrum of this ridge matches high-calcium pyroxene, which was brought up from deeper levels by the impact.

The crater is named after the English mathematician Henry Briggs (1561-1630). His name was included in lunar nomenclature by German astronomer Johann H. Schröter in 1791. Its designation was officially adopted by the International Astronomical Union in 1935.

== Satellite craters ==
By convention these features are identified on lunar maps by placing the letter on the side of the crater midpoint that is closest to Briggs.

Briggs	Latitude	Longitude	Diameter
A	27.1° N	73.7° W	23 km
B	28.1° N	70.9° W	25 km
C	25.0° N	66.9° W	6 km

Briggs A has a mare-covered floor with an irregular array of depressions that were created by lava drainage. Briggs B has a faint ray system.

== Weak continuation of Ohm's eastern ray near Briggs ==
During very favourable libration of the moon's western rim, as seen from Earth, it is possible the observe the weak continuation of the eastern ray from farside crater Ohm. This continuation is located near craters Briggs, Lichtenberg, and Russell. It is also noticeable on the photographic versions of charts LAC 37 (page 74) and LAC 38 (page 76) in The Clementine Atlas of the Moon (Ben Bussey / Paul D. Spudis).
