= Humason (crater) =

Crater on the Moon

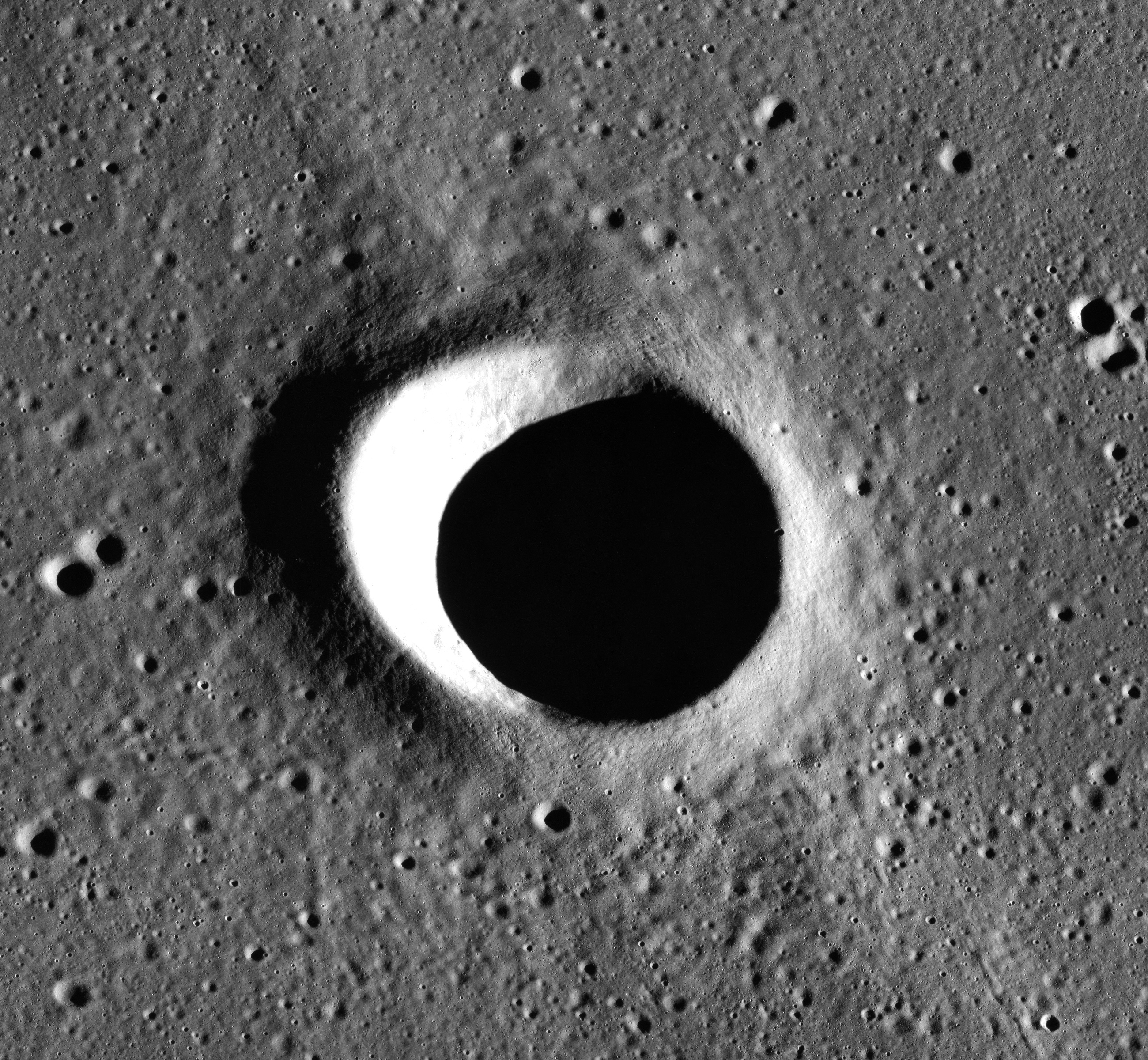
- Apollo 15 image
- Coordinates: 30.7°N 56.6°W
- Diameter: 4 km
- Depth: Unknown
- Colongitude: 57° at sunrise
- Eponym: Milton L. Humason

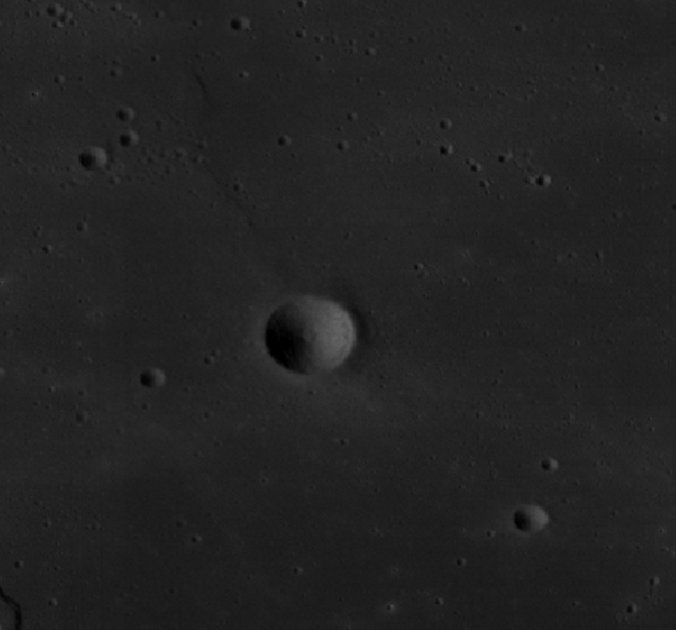
Humason and surrounding area from LRO Wide Angle Camera

Humason is a tiny lunar impact crater located in the Oceanus Procellarum. This is a cup-shaped crater with an outer rim that rises slightly above the surrounding lunar mare. To the west is a low system of mare wrinkle ridges named the Dorsa Whiston that wind southwards towards Montes Agricola.

This crater was previously identified as Lichtenberg G before being renamed by the IAU in 1973. The crater Lichtenberg itself lies over 100 kilometers to the west.
