= Alter (crater) =

Crater on the Moon

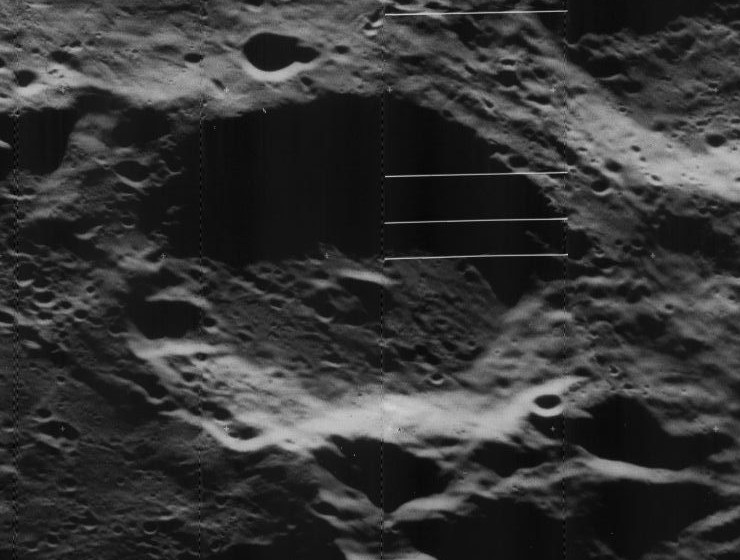
- Oblique Lunar Orbiter 5 image, facing west
- Coordinates: 18.74°N 107.80°W
- Diameter: 64.73 km (40.22 mi)
- Depth: Unknown
- Colongitude: 108° at sunrise
- Eponym: Dinsmore Alter

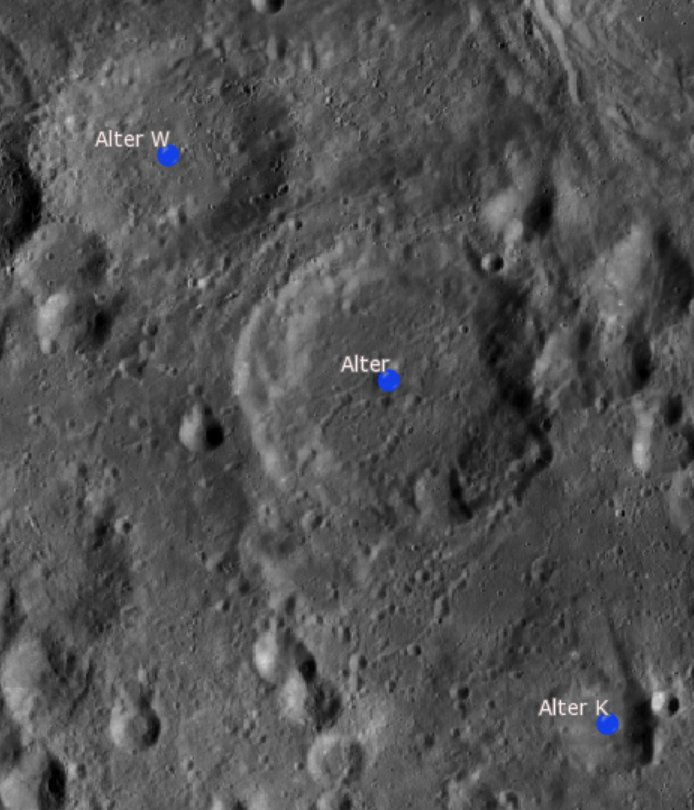
Satellite craters of Alter

Alter is a lunar impact crater that is located in the northern hemisphere on the far side of the Moon. It lies to the southwest of the larger crater Robertson, and to the east of Ohm.

The outer rim of Alter has been degraded by subsequent erosion, most notably at the northern and southern extremes. There is a small crater lying across the south-southeast rim. A cleft runs across the floor from the southern rim toward the north-northeast. Ray material cross the crater floor from the east, forming a pair of faint bands. The infrared spectrum of pure crystalline plagioclase has been identified on the central peak.

This crater is named after American astronomer and meteorologist Dinsmore Alter (1888-1968), an authority on lunar geology. Prior to formal naming by the IAU in 1970, Alter was called Crater 257. The crater Alter W, to the northwest of Alter, was called Crater 255. A crater that is currently unnamed, between Alter W and Comrie K, was called Crater 254.

== Satellite craters ==
By convention these features are identified on lunar maps by placing the letter on the side of the crater midpoint that is closest to Alter.

Alter	Latitude	Longitude	Diameter
K	16.3° N	106.0° W	22 km
W	20.4° N	109.2° W	52 km
