= Luna 13 =

1966 crewless Soviet spacecraft

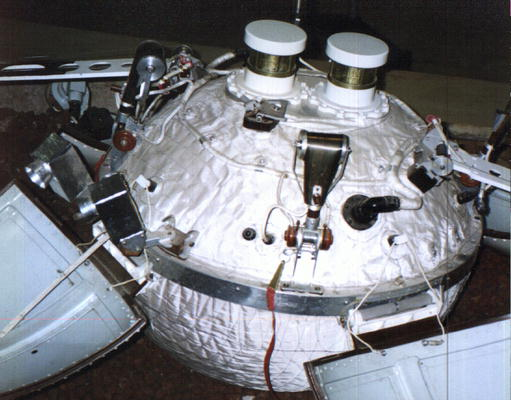
- Mission type: Lunar lander
- Operator: Soviet space program
- COSPAR ID: 1966-116A
- SATCAT no.: 02626
- Mission duration: 6 days, 19 h, 56 min.

Spacecraft properties
- Manufacturer: GSMZ Lavochkin
- Launch mass: 1,620 kg

Start of mission
- Launch date: 21 December 1966, 10:17:08 UTC
- Rocket: Molniya-M 8K78M
- Launch site: Baikonur, Site 1/5

End of mission
- Last contact: 28 December 1966, 06:13 GMT

Lunar lander
- Landing date: 24 December 1966, 18:04 GMT
- Landing site: 18.87°N 62.05°W

Luna 13 (E-6M series) was an uncrewed space mission of the Luna program by Soviet Union.

== Overview ==
The Luna 13 spacecraft was launched toward the Moon onboard a Molniya-M and accomplished a soft landing on 24 December 1966, in the region of Oceanus Procellarum ("Ocean of Storms").

The petal encasement of the spacecraft was opened, antennas were erected, and radio transmissions to Earth began four minutes after the landing. On 25 and 26 December 1966, the spacecraft television system transmitted panoramas of the nearby lunar landscape at different Sun angles. Each panorama required approximately 100 minutes to transmit. The spacecraft was equipped with a mechanical soil-measuring penetrometer, a dynamograph, and a radiation densitometer for obtaining data on the mechanical and physical properties and the cosmic ray reflectivity of the lunar surface. Transmissions from the spacecraft ceased on 28 December 1966.

Luna 13 became the third spacecraft to land successfully on the surface of the Moon (after Luna 9 and the American Surveyor 1). The probe landed in the Ocean of Storms at 18:01 UT on 24 December 1966, between the Krafft and Seleucus craters at 18°52' north latitude and 62°3' west longitude. Unlike its predecessor, the heavier Luna 13 lander (113 kilograms) carried a suite of scientific instruments in addition to the usual imaging system.

A three-axis accelerometer within the pressurized frame of the lander recorded the landing forces during impact to determine the soil structure down to a depth of 20 to 30 centimetres (7.9 to 11.8 in). A pair of spring-loaded booms were also deployed. One of these booms carried a penetrometer, designed to measure the forces required to penetrate the lunar regolith – the penetrating force being supplied by a minute explosive charge. The other boom carried a backscatter densitometer that was used to infer the density of the lunar near-surface regolith. Four radiometers recorded infrared radiation from the surface indicating a noon temperature of 117 ±3 °C while a radiation detector indicated that radiation levels would be less than hazardous for humans.

The lander returned a total of five panoramas of the lunar surface, showing a more smooth terrain than seen by Luna 9. One of the two cameras (intended to return stereo images) failed, but this did not diminish the quality of the photographs. The penetrometer measured the regolith density at 800 kg/m^{3}.

After a fully successful mission, contact was lost at 06:13 UTC on 28th of December when the on-board batteries were exhausted.

== See also ==
- List of artificial objects on the Moon
- List of missions to the Moon
