= Cardanus (crater) =

Lunar impact crater

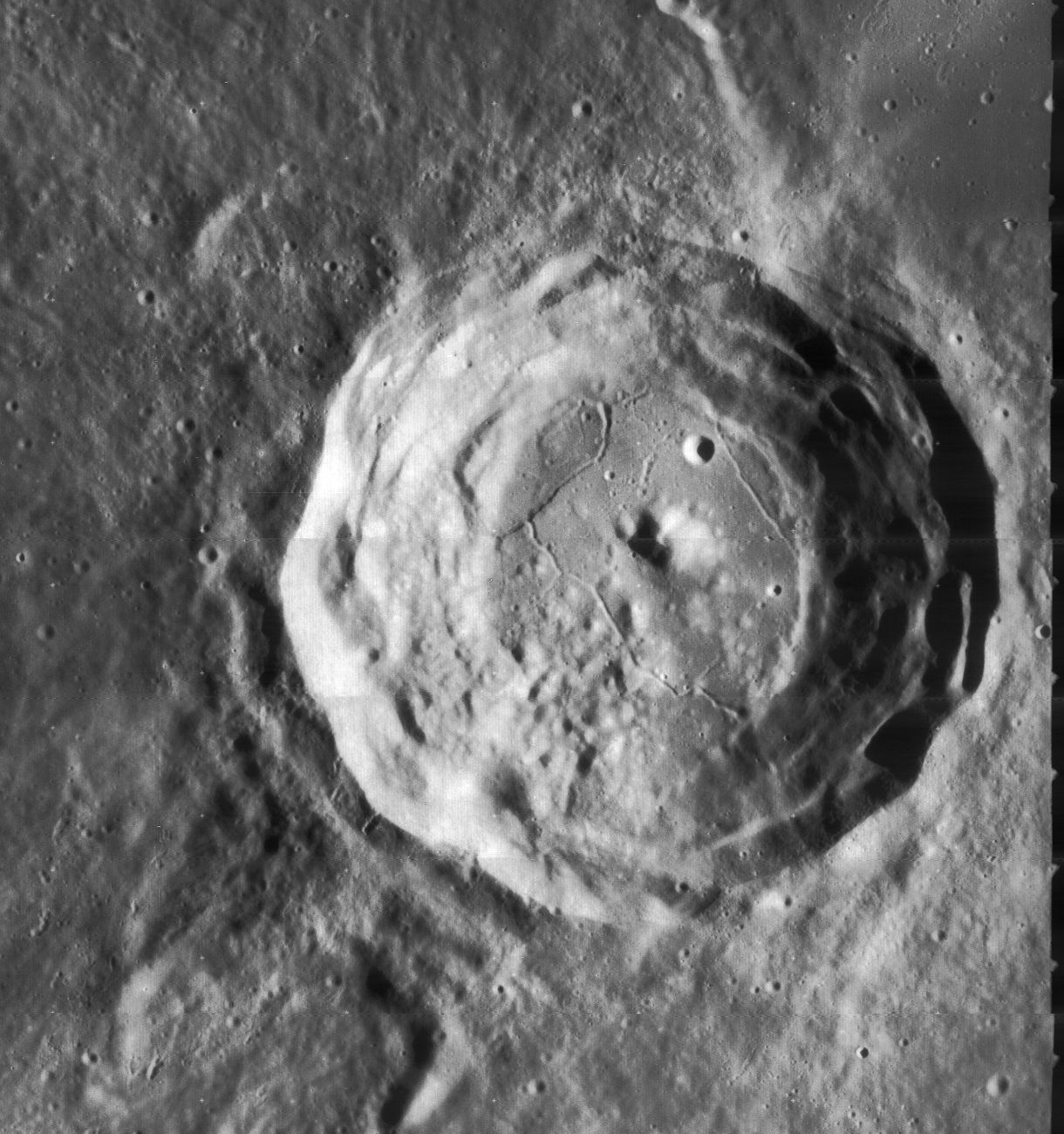
- Lunar Orbiter 4 image
- Coordinates: 13.2°N 72.4°W
- Diameter: 49.57 km (30.80 mi)
- Depth: 1.3 km (0.81 mi)
- Colongitude: 72° at sunrise
- Formation: Upper Imbrian
- Eponym: Gerolamo Cardano

Cardanus is a lunar impact crater that is located in the western part of the Moon, in the western part of the Oceanus Procellarum. It is a crater of Upper (Late) Imbrian age. The surface is rich in pyroxene and feldspathic minerals, with the region showing a mixed mineralogy dominated by clinopyroxene and spinel. Due to its location the crater appears very oval because of foreshortening, as it is viewed from an obtuse angle from Earth.

Cardanus is distinctive for the 60-km long chain of craters, designated Catena Krafft, that connect its northern rim with the crater Krafft to the north. The two form a notable pair on the lunar surface. The outer rim of Cardanus is sharp-edged and somewhat irregular, with a hummocky outer rampart and terraces along parts of the inner wall. This is a floor-fractured crater, showing a series of cracks in the surface. The floor has several small craterlets across its surface, and it has a low ridge near the midpoint. The surface is somewhat irregular in the southwest, but nearly featureless elsewhere.

To the southwest is the 120-km long rille designated Rima Cardanus, a graben system in the mare that generally follows a northeasterly direction. To the southeast, beyond the rille, is the small crater Galilaei. Southwest of Cardanus is Olbers. Ray material from Olbers A lies across Cardanus.

This crater is named for Italian polymath Gerolamo Cardano (1501-1576). His name was included in lunar nomenclature by Italian astronomer Giovanni Riccioli in 1651. Its designation was officially adopted by the International Astronomical Union in 1935.

== Satellite craters ==
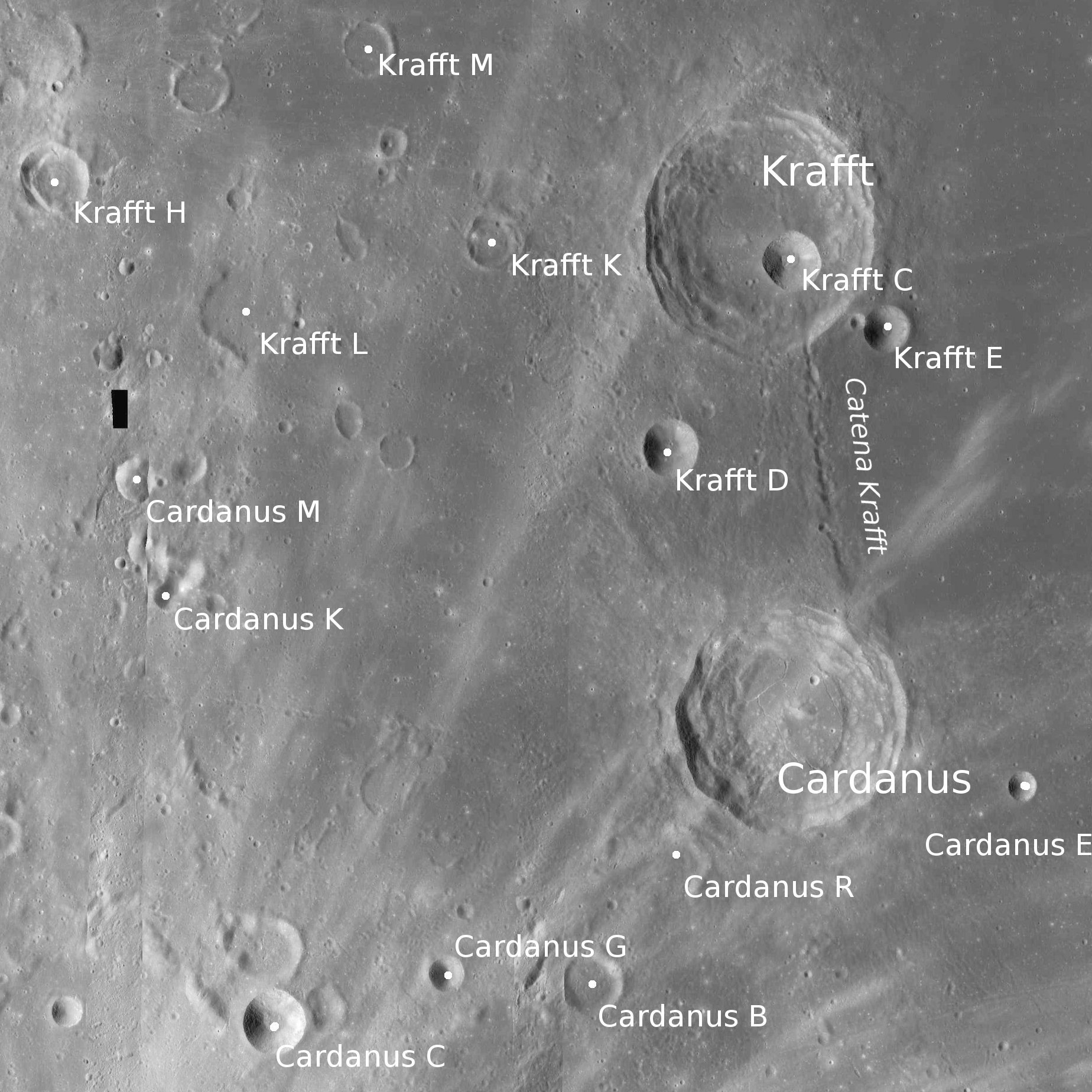
Neighborhood of Cardanus and Krafft, showing satellite craters

By convention these features are identified on lunar maps by placing the letter on the side of the crater midpoint that is closest to Cardanus.

Cardanus	Latitude	Longitude	Diameter
B	11.4° N	73.8° W	13 km
C	11.3° N	76.2° W	14 km
E	12.7° N	70.7° W	6 km
G	11.5° N	74.9° W	8 km
K	14.2° N	76.8° W	8 km
M	14.9° N	77.1° W	9 km
R	12.3° N	73.4° W	21 km
