= Russell (lunar crater) =

Crater on the Moon

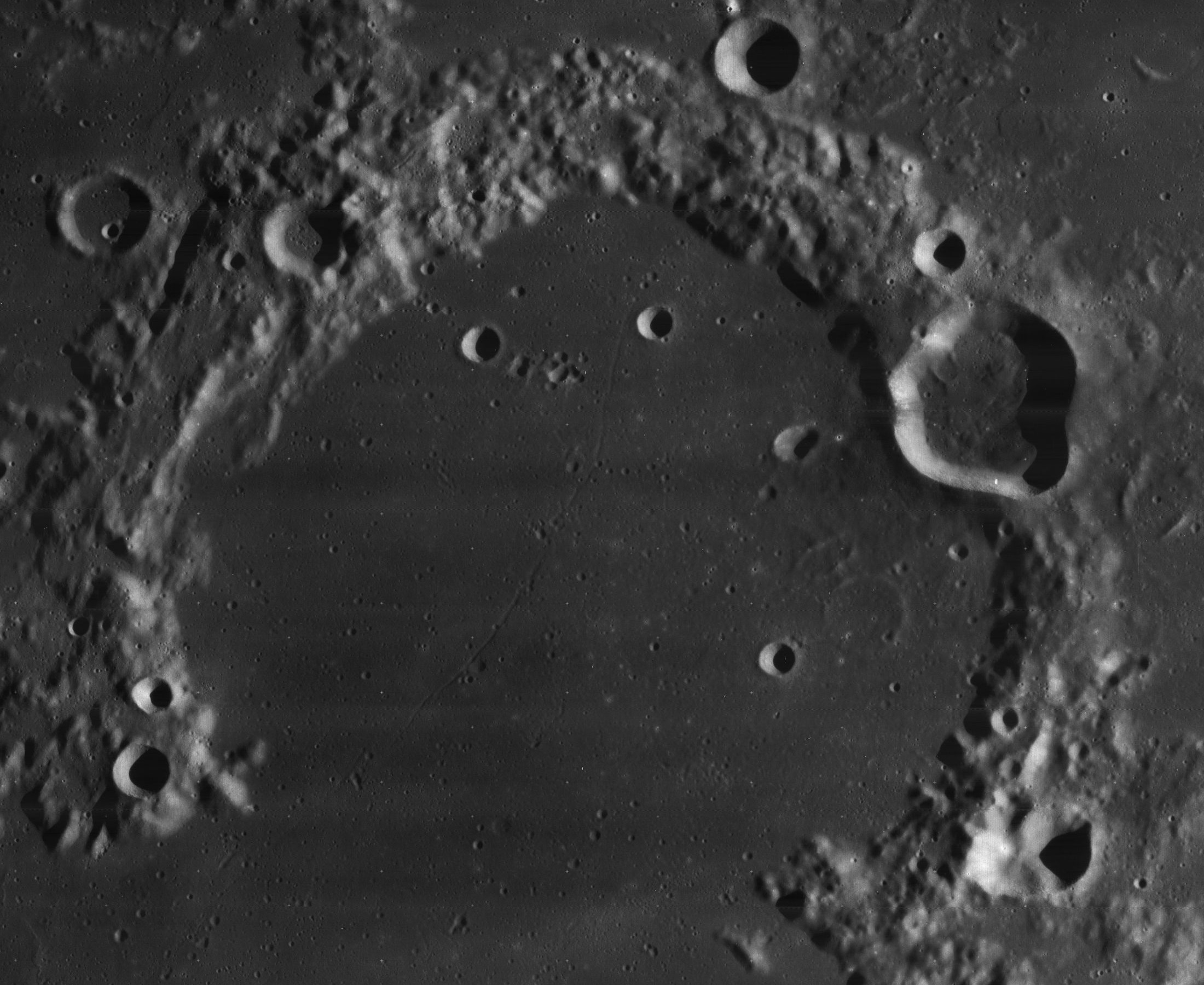
- Lunar Orbiter 4 image
- Coordinates: 26.5°N 75.4°W
- Diameter: 103 km
- Depth: None
- Colongitude: 78° at sunrise
- Eponym: Henry Norris Russell; John Russell

Russell is the lava-flooded remains of a lunar impact crater. It is located in the western part of the Oceanus Procellarum, close to the western lunar limb. As a result, it appears oblong-shaped due to foreshortening.

The south-southwestern rim of Russell overlaps the larger rim of the lava-flooded crater Struve, and together the two crater rims form a figure-8 outline with a wide gap where they are joined. To the east of Russell is Briggs, and to the southeast, adjacent to Struve, is the lava-flooded remains of a crater called Eddington.

The rim of Russell is heavily worn and irregular in form, with multiple crater impacts overlying the wall. The largest of these is Briggs A on the eastern rim. To the north of Russell are the flooded remnants of several smaller craters. Russell's lava-flooded floor is flat and level with the surrounding mare. It lacks a central peak.

This crater is named after American astronomer Henry Norris Russell (1877–1957) and British artist and amateur astronomer John Russell (1745–1806). In the past this crater was sometimes designated as Otto Struve A, or just assumed to be part of the larger Struve. The crater Eddington to the southeast has also been designated as Otto Struve A on old lunar maps.

== Satellite craters ==
By convention these features are identified on lunar maps by placing the letter on the side of the crater midpoint that is closest to Russell.

Russell	Latitude	Longitude	Diameter
B	26.4° N	78.2° W	19 km
E	28.6° N	74.5° W	9 km
F	28.0° N	76.4° W	9 km
R	28.7° N	75.3° W	45 km
S	29.4° N	77.1° W	25 km

== Weak continuation of the eastern ray from Ohm ==
During very favourable libration of the moon's western rim, as seen from Earth, it is possible to observe the weak continuation of the eastern ray from farside crater Ohm. This continuation is located near craters Russell, Briggs, and Lichtenberg. It is also noticeable on the photographic versions of charts LAC 37 (page 74) and LAC 38 (page 76) in The Clementine Atlas of the Moon (Ben Bussey / Paul D. Spudis).

== See also ==
- 1762 Russell, asteroid
- Russell (Martian crater)
