= Seleucus (crater) =

Lunar impact crater

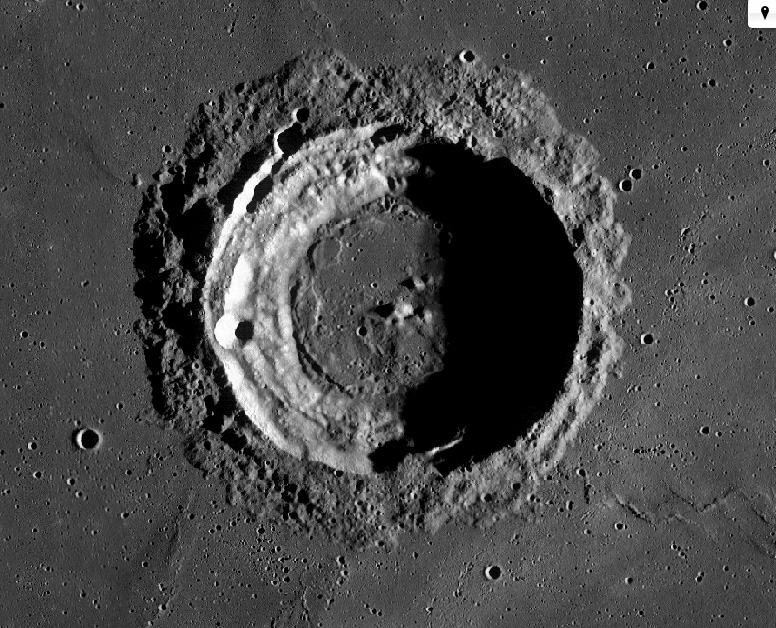
- LRO mosaic at low sun angle
- Coordinates: 21.0°N 66.6°W
- Diameter: 61 km
- Depth: 3.0 km
- Colongitude: 67° at sunrise
- Eponym: Seleucus of Seleucia

Seleucus is a lunar impact crater located in the western part of Oceanus Procellarum. To the west is the lava-flooded remains of the walled plain named Eddington. To the southwest is the crater Krafft and to the northwest lies Briggs.

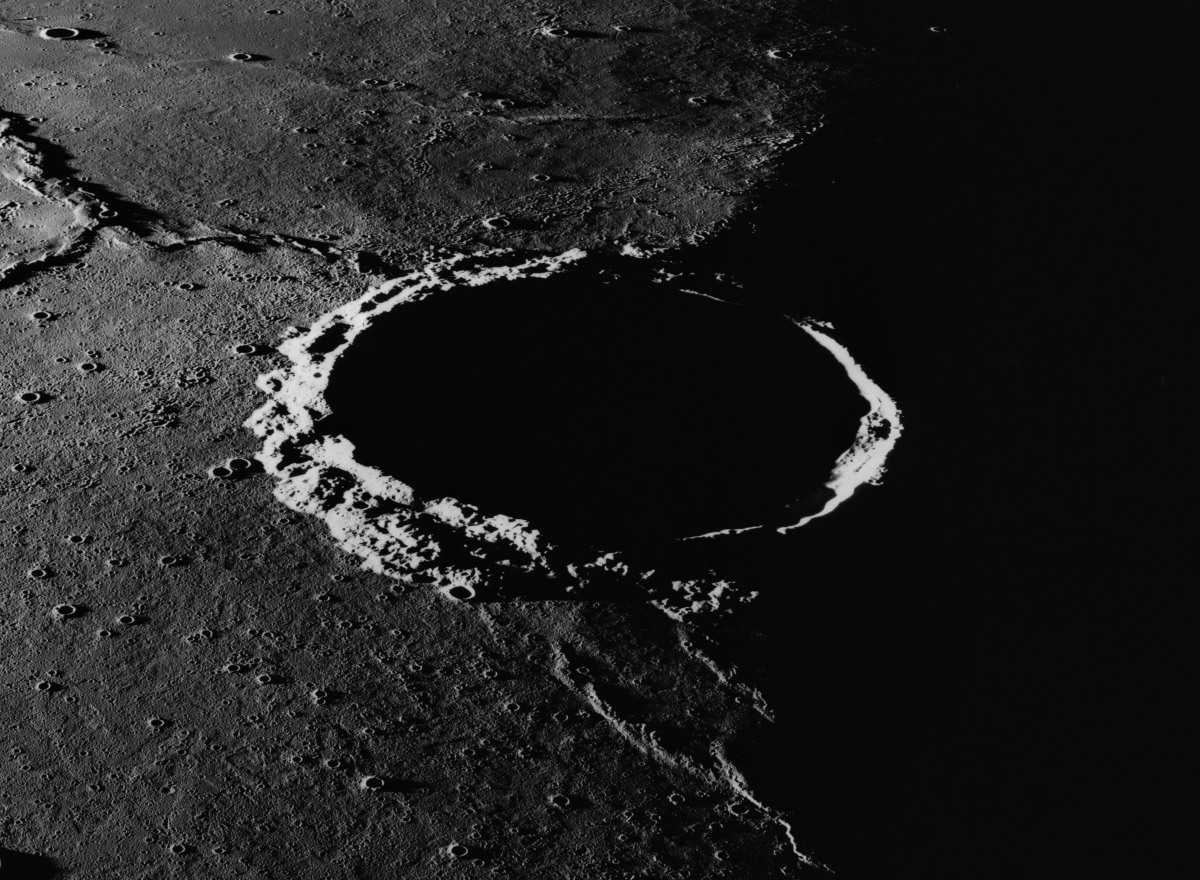
Oblique view facing south from Apollo 15, while at the sunrise terminator

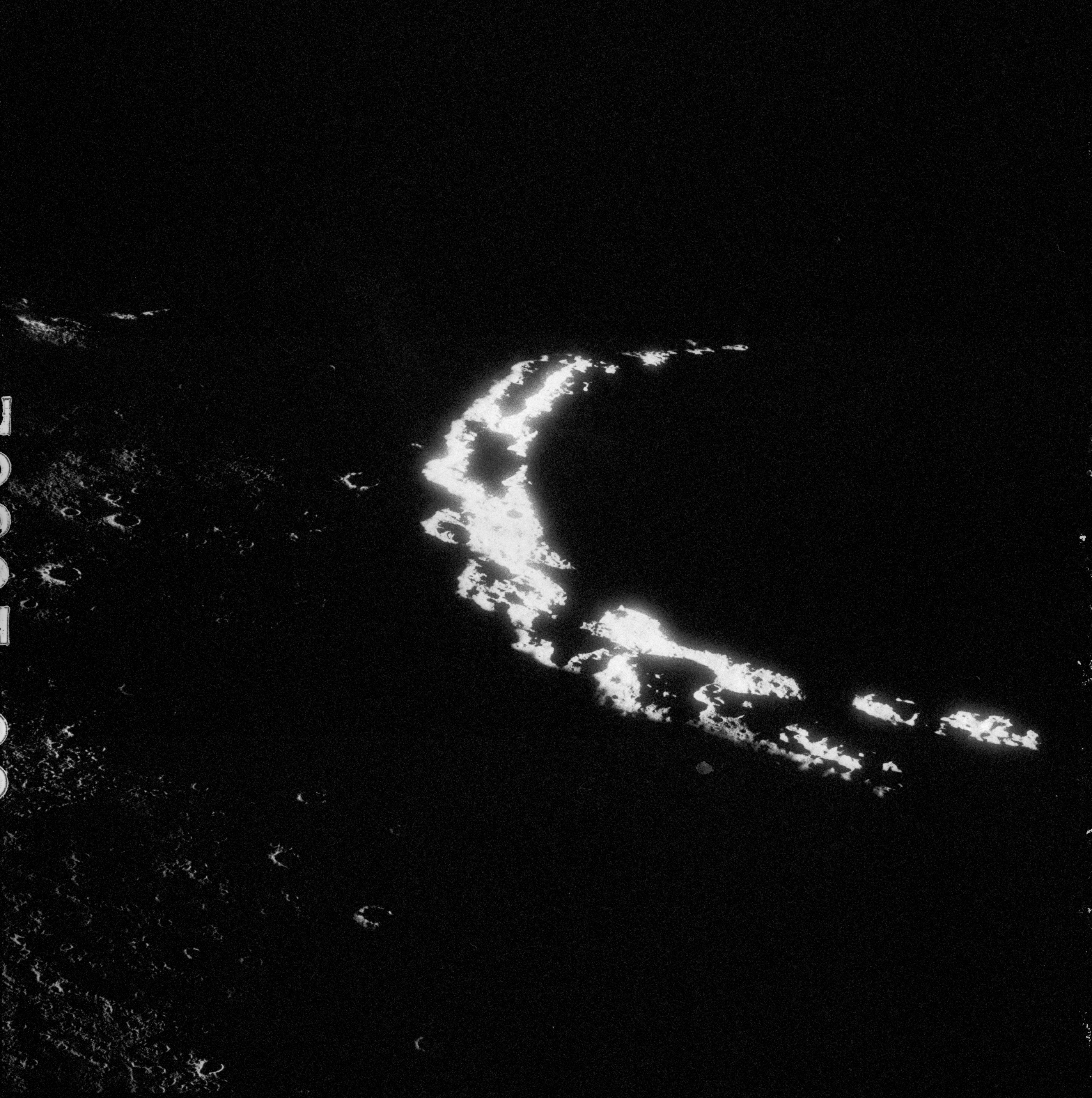
Similar view from Apollo 15 before sunlight struck the west rim.

The rim of Seleucus is well-formed, with a terraced inner rim and a slight rampart. The floor is relatively flat, with a small central peak. A bright ray from Glushko crater, about 500 km to the southwest, grazes the southeastern rim of Seleucus.

The narrowness of the rim of Seleucus and the abrupt contact between its raised rim and the surrounding mare prove that the final mare flooding occurred after the crater was formed, and so the crater is older than the youngest (uppermost) mare basalts in the vicinity.

Approximately 50 kilometers to the southeast of Seleucus, on the Oceanus Procellarum, is the landing site of the Soviet landing craft Luna 13.

== Satellite craters ==
By convention these features are identified on lunar maps by placing the letter on the side of the crater midpoint that is closest to Seleucus.

Seleucus	Latitude	Longitude	Diameter
A	22.0° N	60.5° W	6 km
E	22.4° N	63.9° W	4 km

== See also ==
- 3288 Seleucus, minor planet
