= Robertson (crater) =

Crater on the Moon

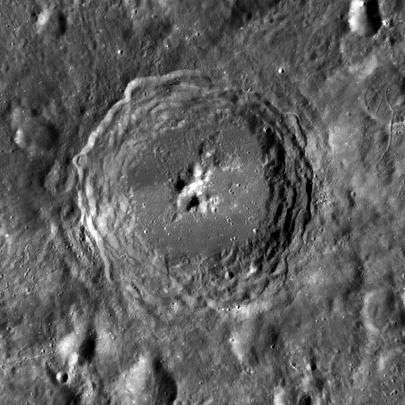
- LRO image, which also shows rays from Ohm in the southern half of the crater
- Coordinates: 21.84°N 105.37°W
- Diameter: 89.85 km (55.83 mi)
- Depth: Unknown
- Colongitude: 106° at sunrise
- Formation: Copernican
- Eponym: Howard P. Robertson

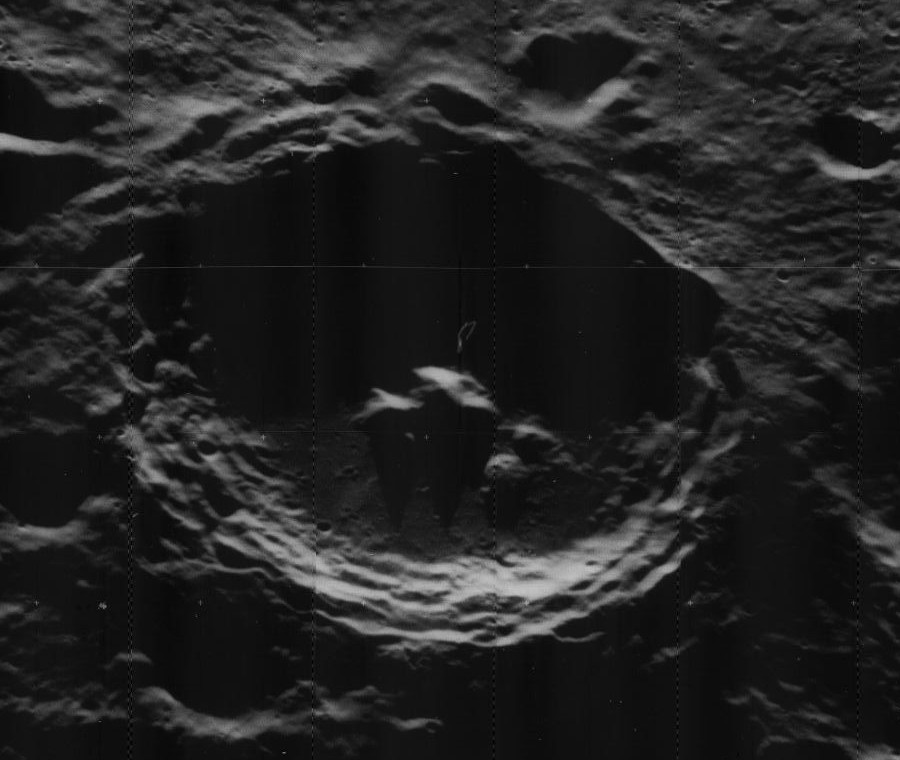
Oblique Lunar Orbiter 5 image, facing west

Robertson is a mostly intact lunar impact crater that is located on the far side of the Moon, just beyond the western limb. It lies just to the south of Berkner, a formation with a comparable size but more eroded features. Just to the east is Helberg, and to the southwest is Alter.

This formation dates to the Copernican period on the lunar geologic timescale. The inner wall of the crater rim has wide, complex layers of multiple terraces. The rim is approximately circular, but with an irregular outline where various terraces have slumped away. The interior has a central peak at the midpoint, and this is joined to a rugged stretch of ground that connects with the northeastern rim. A band of light-hued ray material from Ohm covers the southern half of the crater floor and rim.

Prior to formal naming by the IAU in 1970, Robertson was called Crater 177.
