= Wolfgang Ludwig Krafft =

German astronomer and physicist

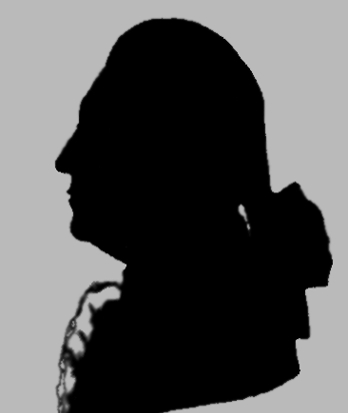
Silhouette of Wolfgang Ludwig Krafft

Wolfgang Ludwig Krafft (25 August 1743 – 20 November 1814) was a German astronomer and physicist. He is the namesake of the lunar crater Krafft which has a diameter of 51 km.
