= Lichtenberg (crater) =

Crater on the Moon

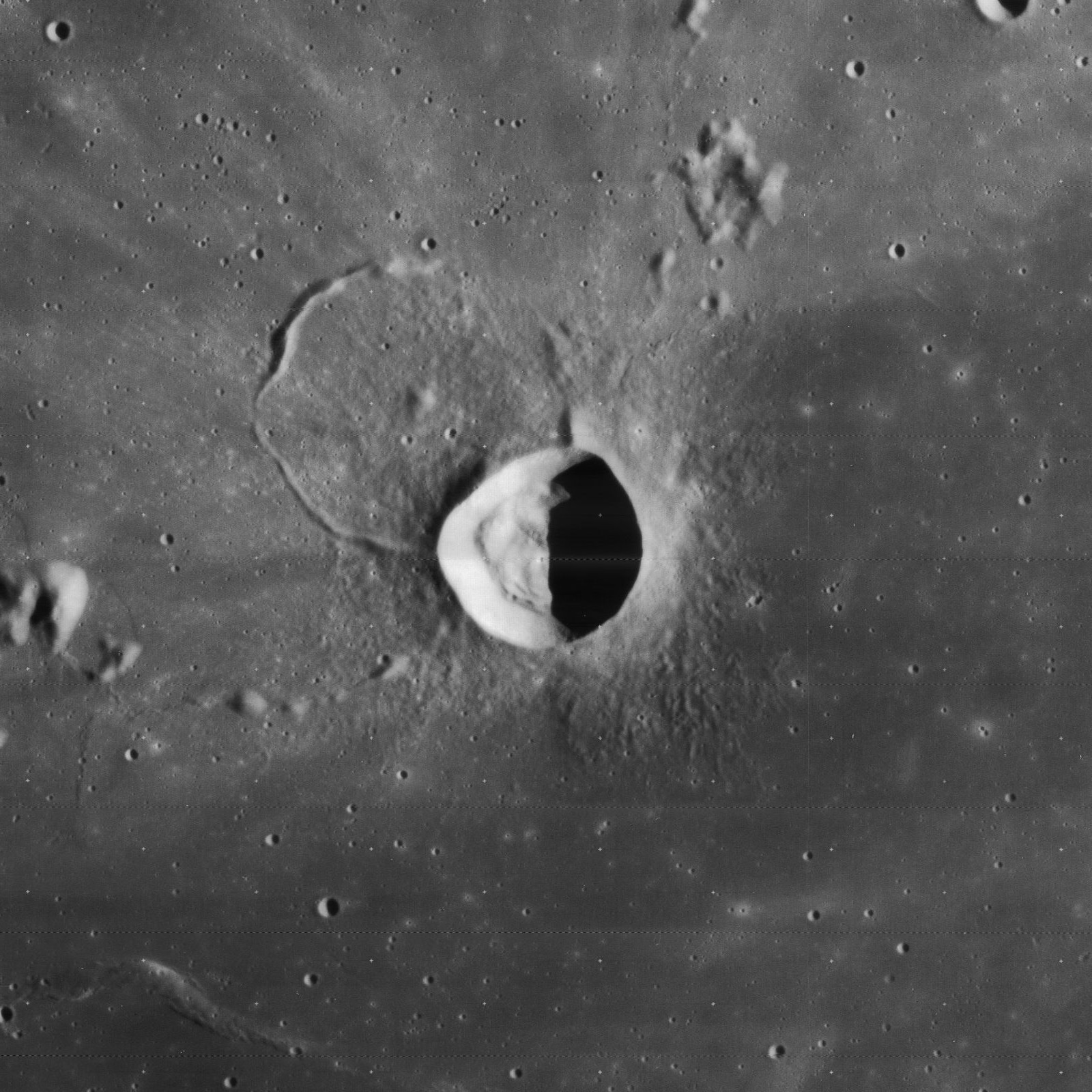
- Lunar Orbiter 4 image
- Coordinates: 31.8°N 67.7°W
- Diameter: 20 km
- Depth: 1.2 km
- Colongitude: 68° at sunrise
- Formation: Copernican
- Eponym: Georg C. Lichtenberg

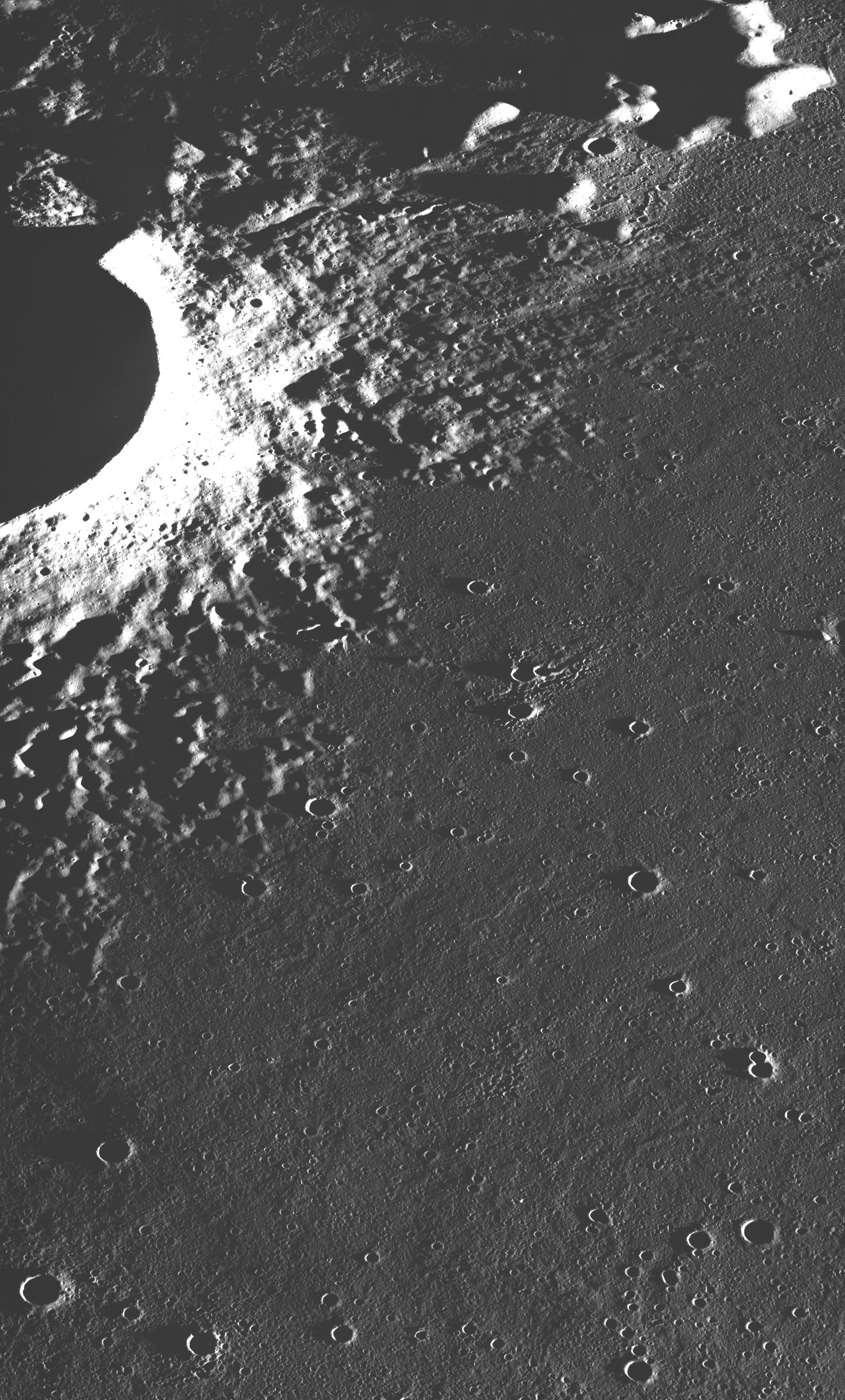
Oblique view of part of Lichtenberg while at the sunrise terminator, from Apollo 15, showing relatively young mare lava at right

Lichtenberg is an isolated lunar impact crater located in the western part of the Oceanus Procellarum. The nearest crater of note is Briggs to the south.

== Description ==
The rim of this crater is circular and sharp-edged, with negligible wear. On the inner sides the loose material has slid to the base, forming a ring of scree about the interior floor. Both the rim and the interior floor exhibit a relatively high albedo, which is usually an indication of a younger crater that has not been darkened by space weathering. Lichtenberg overlies a larger, ring-shaped ghost crater to the northwest, which has a low central rise. This feature is covered by ray material.

== Geology ==
Lichtenberg has a small system of rays, a characteristic of Copernican Period craters. The rays extend to the north and west of the crater but not elsewhere. The remaining flanks of the surface about the crater exhibit the low albedo of the lunar mare, and several mare flows have overlaid the existing rays on the east and south sides of the crater. These are thus among the youngest deposits of basaltic lava on the Moon, and are believed to be less than 1 billion years in age based on high-resolution crater statistics of the thin superposed lava flow. A lunar geologic map from 2020 identifies the older mare next to Lichtenberg as being Upper Imbrian.

== Appearance ==
The photographic versions of charts LAC 37 (page 74) and LAC 38 (page 76) in The Clementine Atlas of the Moon (Ben Bussey / Paul D. Spudis) show weak parts of the eastern ray from farside crater Ohm. This ray is noticeable between craters Lichtenberg and Briggs, and also north of crater Russell. Only during very favourable libration of the moon's western rim, as seen from Earth, it is possible to observe this weak section of Ohm's eastern ray.

Lichtenberg has been noted in the past for occurrences of transient lunar phenomenon. These typically take the form of a temporary, red-hued patch.

== Exploration ==
In the 1990s, lunar scientist Paul Spudis advocated for an uncrewed sample-return mission to the young mare to obtain an absolute radiometric date that would constrain the time period of the formation of the maria on the moon.

In the 2000s, the region was identified by NASA as one of the Constellation program regions of interest for crewed landings. It was categorized as "tier 2", giving it similar priority as eg. Aitken, Riccioli, or Mare Crisium, but lower than the "tier 1" areas like Reiner Gamma, Malapert massif, or Copernicus.

== Satellite craters ==
By convention these features are identified on lunar maps by placing the letter on the side of the crater midpoint that is closest to Lichtenberg.

Lichtenberg	Latitude	Longitude	Diameter
A	29.0° N	60.1° W	7 km
B	33.3° N	61.5° W	5 km
F	33.2° N	65.3° W	5 km
H	31.5° N	58.9° W	4 km
R	34.7° N	70.2° W	34 km

The following craters have been renamed by the IAU.

- Lichtenberg G — See Humason (crater).
