= Dinsmore Alter =

American astronomer (1888–1968)

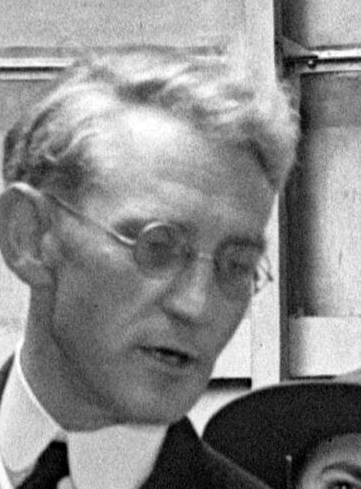
- Born: March 28, 1888
- Died: September 20, 1968 (aged 80)
- Spouse: Ada McClelland
- Military career
- Branch: United States Army
- Rank: Colonel
- Other work: astronomer, meteorologist

Dinsmore Alter (March 28, 1888 – September 20, 1968) was an American astronomer, meteorologist, and United States Army officer. He is known for his work with the Griffith Observatory and his creation of a lunar atlas.

== Early life ==
He was born in Colfax, Washington, and attended college at Westminster College in Pennsylvania. After graduating in 1909 with a B.S. degree, he married Ada McClelland. The couple had one child, Helen.

== Career ==
Dinsmore performed his graduate studies at the University of Pittsburgh, and earned a master's in astronomy with additional studies in the field of meteorology. In 1911, he became an instructor at the University of Alabama, teaching physics and astronomy. The following year he became an assistant professor, then an adjunct professor in 1913.

In 1914, he moved to the University of California, Berkeley, teaching astronomy while also studying for his doctorate. He gained his Ph.D. in astronomy in 1916. By 1917, he became an assistant professor of astronomy at the University of Kansas. However, when the United States entered World War I, he took time off to serve as a major in the United States Army.

After returning home following the war, he rejoined the University of Kansas and remained at that institution for nearly 20 years. He was promoted to associate professor in 1919, then professor in 1924.

In 1932, Clyde Tombaugh, who had discovered Pluto two years earlier, enrolled at the University of Kansas on a scholarship and was assigned to Alter as his astronomy professor. Alter refused to let Tombaugh take the introductory astronomy course, telling him that "for a planet discoverer to enroll in a course of introductory astronomy is unthinkable."

From 1925 until 1927, he served as the vice-president of the American Meteorological Society. He was then awarded a Guggenheim Fellowship scholarship and spent two years studying astronomy in Britain. In 1935, he took a leave from the University of Kansas and became director of the Griffith Observatory. A year later he resigned his professorship to remain director at the observatory. He also served as a research associate at Caltech in Pasadena during the same period.

After the U.S. entered the Second World War, Dr. Alter took a leave from his position to serve in the armed forces for four years. He became a colonel and served in a transport division. He remained a member of the army reserve following the war, training at Fort MacArthur, Los Angeles.

His earlier studies had focused on solar observation, but after the war he concentrated on the Moon. As his expertise increased, he became an authority on the geology of the Moon, including its surface and history. He also remained involved in astronomy research, and in 1950 he served a term as president of the Astronomical Society of the Pacific.

In 1956, he used the 60" reflector at the Mount Wilson Observatory to observe a peculiar obscuration on part of the floor of Alphonsus crater, which brought him worldwide notice. (This is a class of events now called a transient lunar phenomenon.)

During 1958, he reached mandatory retirement age, and was officially retired on March 31 and was succeeded by Clarence H. Cleminshaw, who had been associate director of the observatory.

However, he remained active during his retirement, writing several books on astronomy and performing consulting services. He also served as Director Emeritus for the Griffith Observatory.

He can be seen as a contestant on the 1st January 1953 edition of You Bet Your Life.

== Awards and honors ==
- Fellow of the Royal Astronomical Society.
- Guggenheim Fellowship scholarship, 1929–1930.
- Honorary doctorate, Monmouth College, 1941.
- G. Bruce Blair Award, 1958.
- Pendray Aerospace Literature Award, 1965.
- The crater Alter on the Moon is named after him.

== Selected works ==
- Alter, Dinsmore. Application of Marvin's Periodocrite to Rainfall Periodicity. Lawrence, Kan: University of Kansas, 1920. OCLC 10874962
- Alter, Dinsmore. "A Critical Test of the Planetary Hypothesis of Sun Spots," Monthly Weather Review, 1929, April.
- Alter, Dinsmore, & Clarence H. Cleminshaw, "Palomar observatory", Los Angeles, Griffith Observatory.
- Alter, Dinsmore. Introduction to Practical Astronomy, New York, Crowell, 1933. OCLC 1166649
- Alter, Dinsmore. Introduction to the Moon, Los Angeles, Griffith Observatory, 1958. OCLC 3192616
- Alter, Dinsmore. Pictorial Guide to the Moon, London, Arthur Barker Ltd., 1963.
- Alter, Dinsmore. Lunar Atlas, North American Aviation, 1964. OCLC 7917095
- Alter, Dinsmore, Clarence H. Cleminshaw, and John G. Phillips, Pictorial astronomy, New York, Crowell, 1974.
