= Struve (crater) =

Crater on the Moon

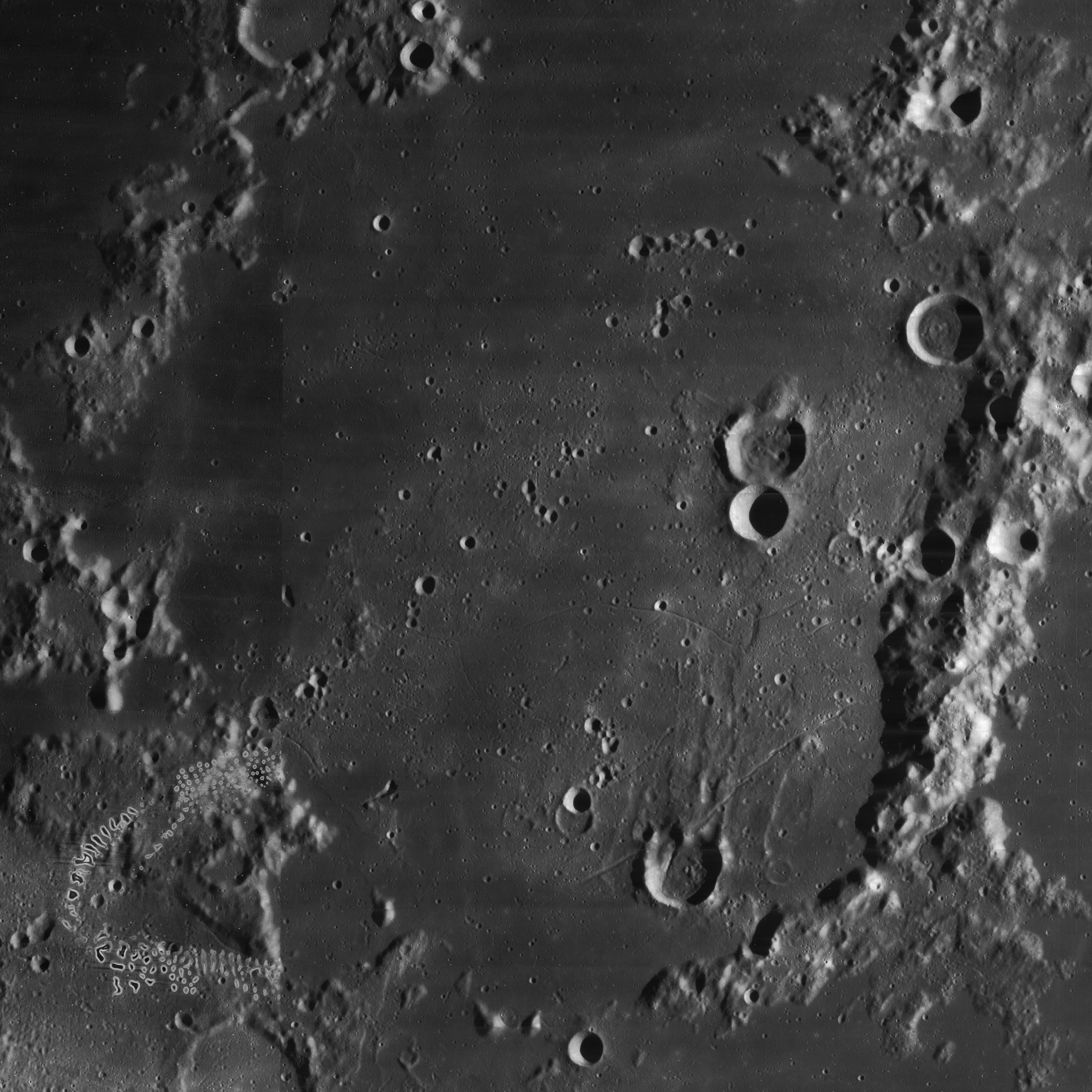
- Mosaic of Lunar Orbiter 4 images
- Coordinates: 23.0°N 76.6°W
- Diameter: 170 km
- Depth: None
- Colongitude: 80° at sunrise
- Eponym: Friedrich G. W. von Struve; Otto W. von Struve; Otto Struve

Struve is the lava-flooded remains of a lunar impact crater. T. W. Webb described it as "remarkably dark" at full Moon. It is located near the western extreme of the Oceanus Procellarum, close to the western lunar limb. As a consequence, even though it is roughly circular in outline, it appears oval due to foreshortening.

The northern rim of this crater intersects the smaller lava-flooded crater Russell to the north, and there is now a wide gap between the two formations. Attached to the southeast rim is the remains of another lava-flooded formation, Eddington. Farther to the southwest is Balboa, near the lunar limb.

The rim of Struve is heavily worn and irregular, with several gaps connecting to the surrounding mare. It resembles little more than a circular mountain range, climbing to a maximum height of 1.7 km. There are several small impact craters within the wall, most notably in the southeast part of the crater. The crater Struve G overlaps the inner part of the western rim, and just to the north of this crater is a gap in the wall that connects to the Oceanus Procellarum between the rims of Russell and Eddington.

== Terminology ==
On older maps this formation was named Otto Struve. Its current name, Struve, now honors three members of the eponymous Baltic German family, all astronomers: Friedrich G. W. von Struve, Otto W. von Struve and Otto Struve. The Russell crater was sometimes designated as Otto Struve A on older maps, and similarly the Eddington (crater) crater was also designated as Otto Struve A on old lunar maps.

== Satellite craters ==
By convention these features are identified on lunar maps by placing the letter on the side of the crater midpoint that is closest to Struve.

Struve	Latitude	Longitude	Diameter
B	19.0° N	77.0° W	14 km
C	22.9° N	75.3° W	11 km
D	25.3° N	73.6° W	10 km
F	22.5° N	73.6° W	9 km
G	23.9° N	73.9° W	14 km
H	25.2° N	83.3° W	21 km
K	23.5° N	73.0° W	6 km
L	20.7° N	76.0° W	15 km
M	23.3° N	76.2° W	15 km
