= Dorsa Whiston =

Wrinkle ridge system on the Moon

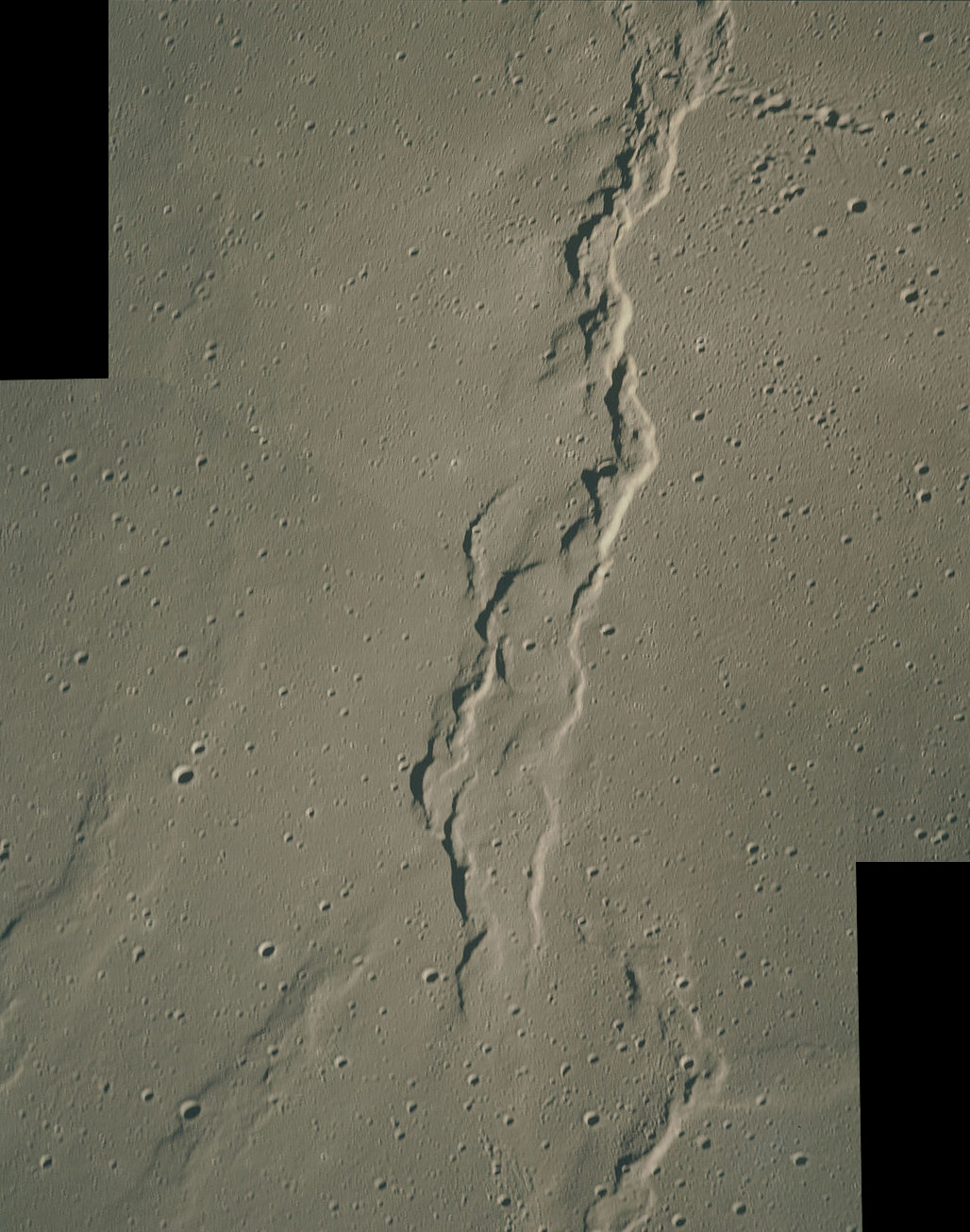
- Mosaic of Apollo 15 images, showing part of Dorsa Whiston
- Feature type: Wrinkle ridge system
- Location: Oceanus Procellarum
- Coordinates: 29.4°N 56.4°W
- Length: 221 km (137 mi)

Dorsa Whiston is a wrinkle ridge system at 29.4°N 56.4°W in Oceanus Procellarum on the Moon. It has an approximate length of 221 km (137 mi), and was named after William Whiston in 1976.
