= Eddington (crater) =

Crater on the Moon

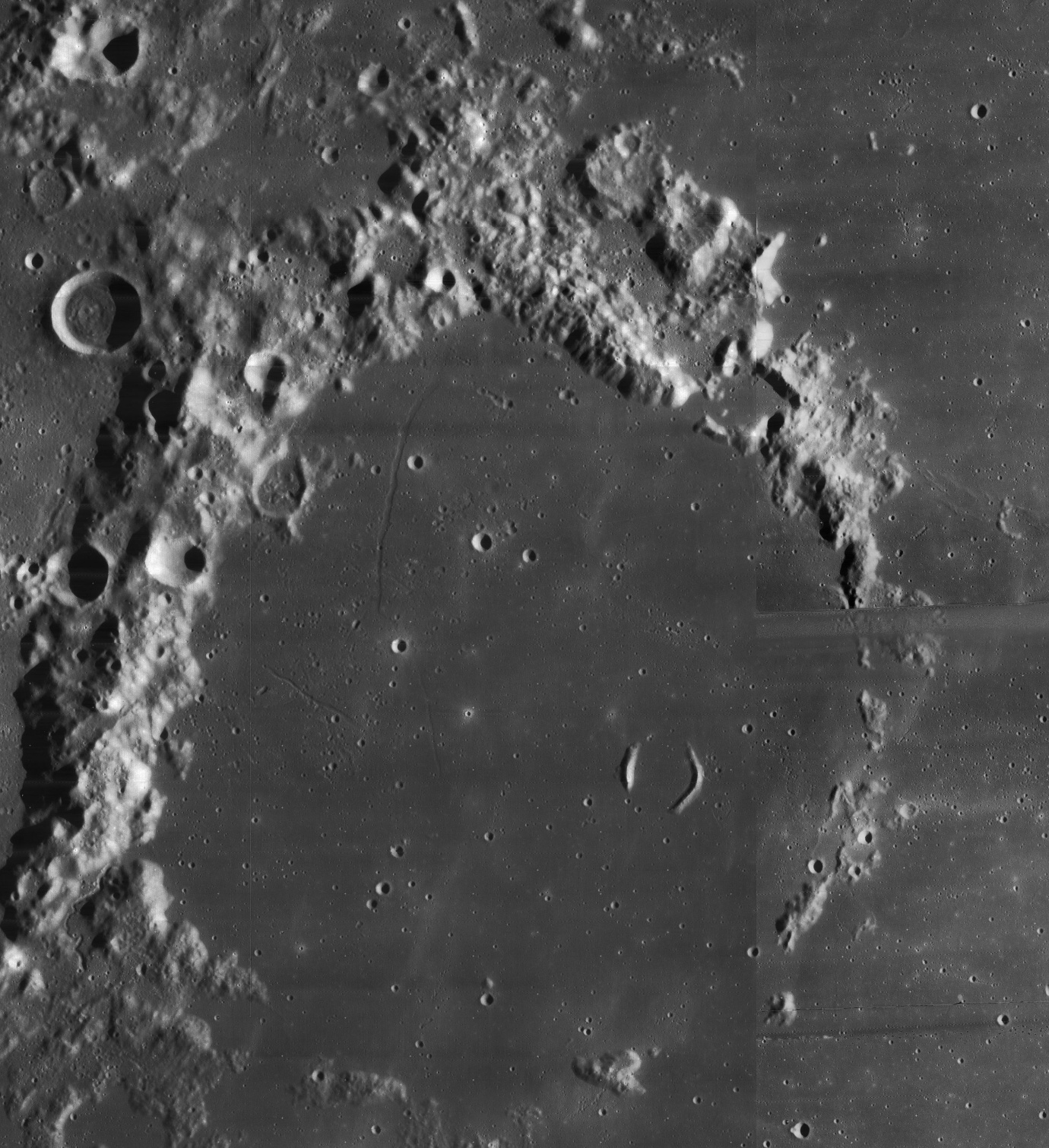
- Mosaic of two Lunar Orbiter 4 images
- Coordinates: 21.5°N 71.8°W
- Diameter: 120.13 km (74.65 mi)
- Depth: None
- Colongitude: 72° at sunrise
- Eponym: Arthur S. Eddington

Eddington is the basalt-flooded remnant of a lunar impact crater, located on the western part of Oceanus Procellarum. The western rim is attached to the wall of the walled plain Struve. To the east-southeast is the smaller but prominent crater Seleucus. South of Eddington is Krafft.

The south and southeastern rim of Eddington is almost completely gone, leaving only a few ridges and promontories in the lunar mare to trace the outline of the original crater. As a consequence, Eddington is now essentially a bay in the Oceanus Procellarum. The remainder of the rim is worn and irregular, forming a mountainous arc that is widest in the north. The floor is almost free of craters of significance, with the nearly submerged crater Eddington P lying in the southeast sector. If the crater once had a central peak, it is no longer evident.

There is an 1.5 km diameter lunar dome located just to the east of Eddington. This may be a volcanic feature, as suggested by the summit pit.

The crater was named after British astronomer and mathematician Sir Arthur Stanley Eddington (1882–1944). His name was first proposed in the lunar nomenclature of H. P. Wilkins in 1948, but for a different feature. Eddington's name was then attached to the modern feature by David W. G. Arthur and Ewen Whitaker in their Rectified Lunar Atlas (1963). Its designation was officially adopted by the International Astronomical Union in 1964.

== Satellite craters ==
By convention these features are identified on lunar maps by placing the letter on the side of the crater midpoint that is closest to Eddington.

Eddington	Latitude	Longitude	Diameter
P	21.0° N	71.0° W	12 km
