= Krafft (crater) =

Crater on the Moon

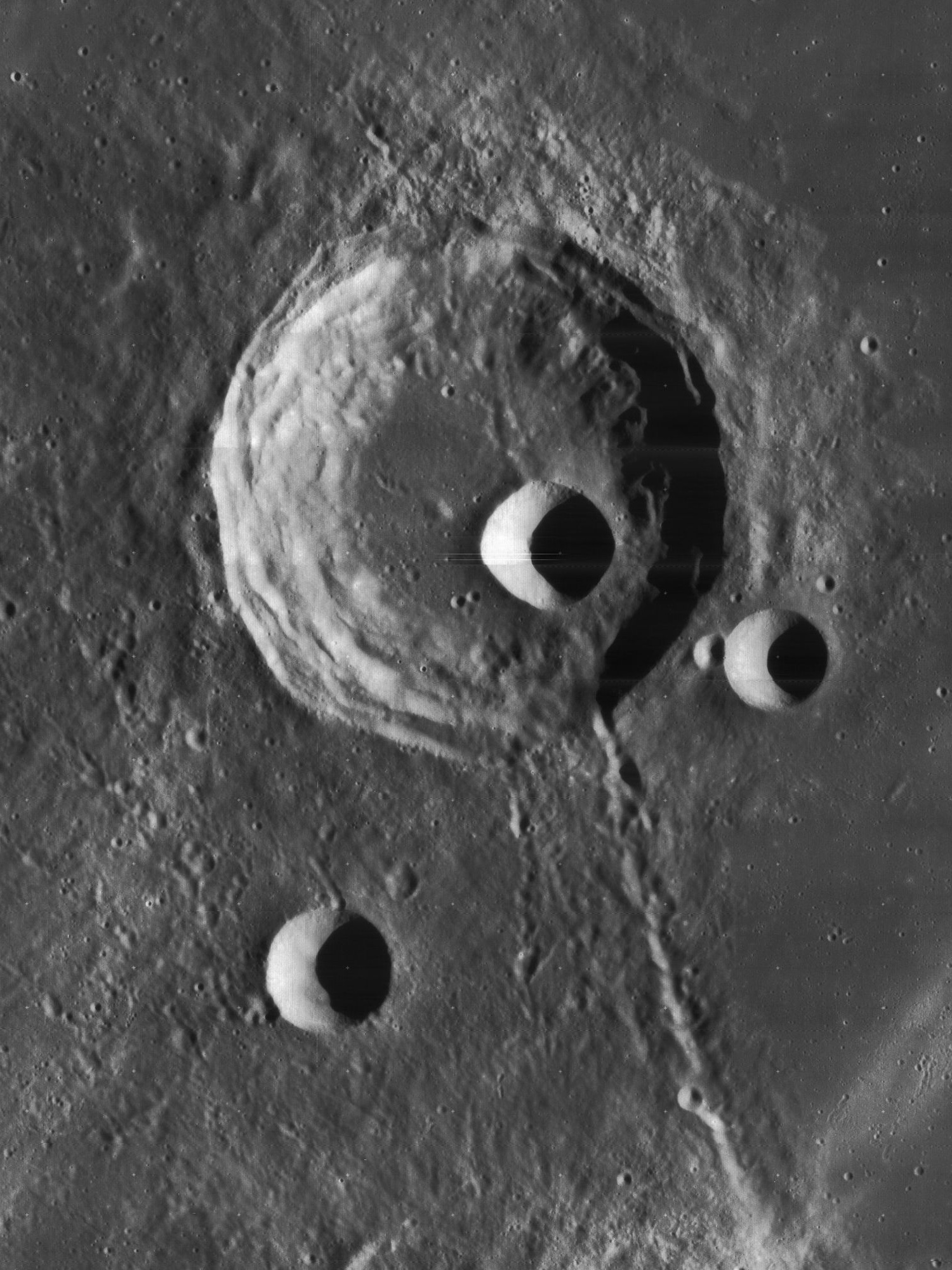
- Lunar Orbiter 4 image
- Coordinates: 16.6°N 72.6°W
- Diameter: 51 km
- Depth: 2.0 km
- Colongitude: 73° at sunrise
- Eponym: Wolfgang L. Krafft

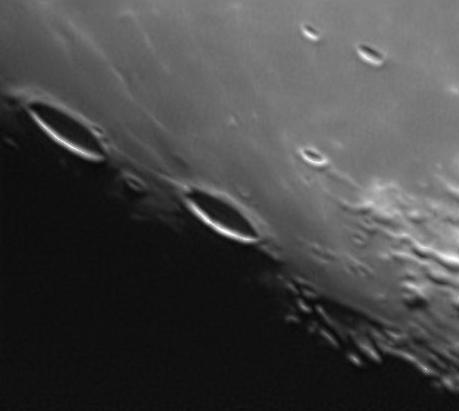
Krafft (left) and Cardanus (center) near the terminator, as viewed from Earth. Also visible is the Rima Cardanus between them and the crater Galilaei beyond.

Krafft is a prominent lunar impact crater located near the western edge of the Oceanus Procellarum. To the north is the basalt lava-flooded walled plain named Eddington. Almost due south is the crater Cardanus, and the two are connected by a 60-kilometer-long chain of craters known as the Catena Krafft.

Krafft has a sharp, circular rim with a rampart on the exterior, and no central peak. There are several associated craters near the southern rim that are notable for their size in relation to the dimensions of Krafft.

Krafft is a crater of Upper (Late) Imbrian age.

== Satellite craters ==
By convention these features are identified on lunar maps by placing the letter on the side of the crater midpoint that is closest to Krafft.

Krafft	Latitude	Longitude	Diameter
C	16.4° N	72.3° W	13 km
D	15.1° N	73.3° W	12 km
E	15.9° N	71.7° W	10 km
H	17.0° N	77.8° W	15 km
K	16.5° N	74.5° W	11 km
L	16.0° N	76.3° W	20 km
M	17.8° N	75.5° W	10 km
U	17.2° N	64.7° W	3 km
