= Ohm (crater) =

Crater on the Moon

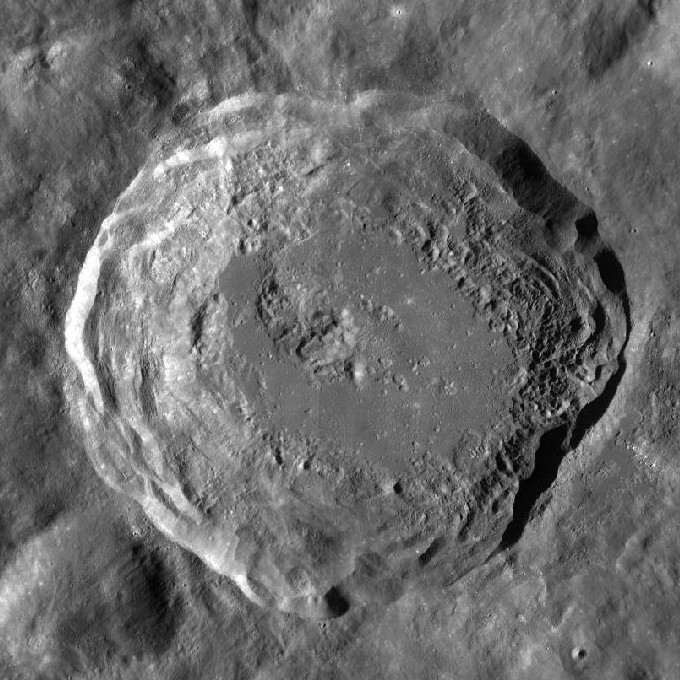
- LRO WAC image
- Coordinates: 18.32°N 113.78°W
- Diameter: 61.75 km (38.37 mi)
- Depth: Unknown
- Colongitude: 114° at sunrise
- Formation: Copernican
- Eponym: Georg S. Ohm

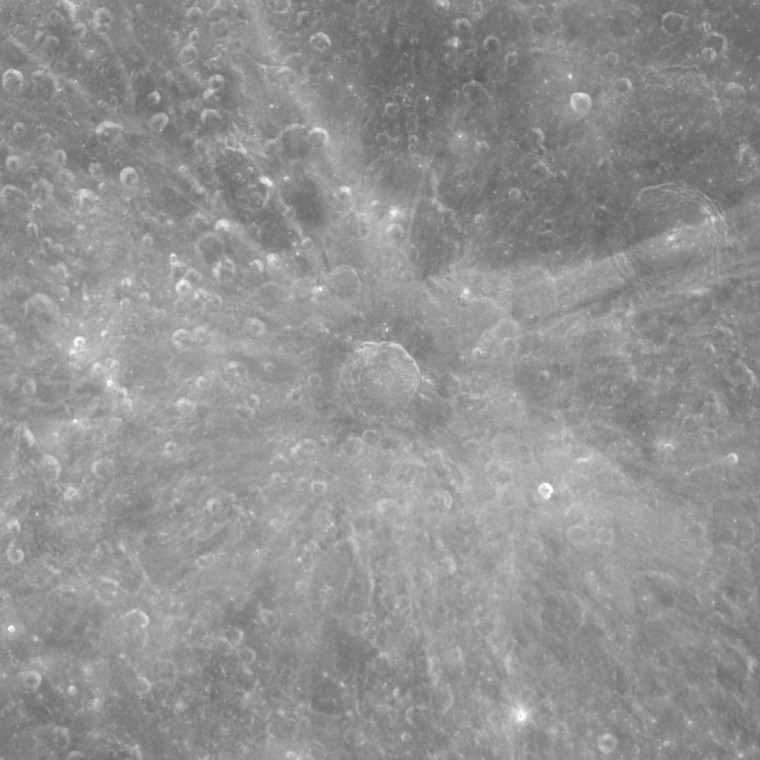
Clementine mosaic showing Ohm and much of its bright ray system.

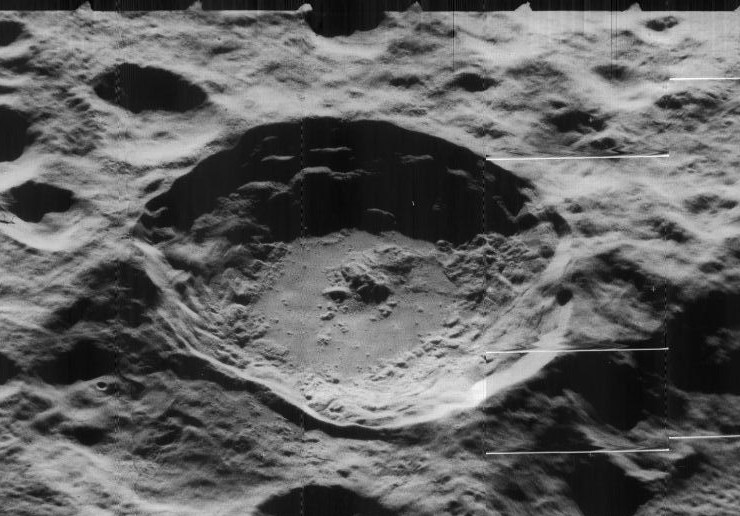
Oblique Lunar Orbiter 5 image, facing west

Ohm is a lunar impact crater that is located on the far side of the Moon. It lies to the south of the crater Comrie, and the satellite crater Comrie K is attached to Ohm's northeastern rim. To the northwest is the larger Shternberg, and to the southwest is Kamerlingh Onnes. It is named after the German physicist Georg Simon Ohm.

This formation dates to the Copernican period and has a meteoritic iron-rich impact melt. It is located at the origin of a ray system that extends for several hundred kilometers across the surrounding lunar terrain. The exterior surface for about 20–30 km is relatively free of the ray material, but beyond that perimeter is a skirt of higher albedo, with streaks extending to the northwest, east-northeast, and southwards.

The outer rim of Ohm is sharply defined, except at the southern end where the edge is somewhat irregular. The inner surface drops down to an interior blanket of slumped material that slopes down to the floor. The crater has a modest central peak. The spectra of this rise fits a gabbro mineralogy, which was excavated from a depth of 6.4 to 9.9 km.

Prior to formal naming by the IAU in 1970, Ohm was called Crater 253.

== Continuation of Ohm's eastern ray near Briggs, Lichtenberg, and Russell ==
The continuation of the prominent eastern ray from Ohm is detectable near craters Briggs, Lichtenberg, and Russell on the moon's near side. This continuation is very weak, and is only observable during favourable libration of the moon's western rim, as seen from Earth. It is also noticeable on the photographic versions of LAC charts 37 and 38 (pages 74 and 76) in The Clementine Atlas of the Moon (Ben Bussey / Paul D. Spudis).

== Artemis II ==
The view of Ohm and its surroundings was first captured by human eyes during the lunar flyby of Artemis II in April 2026. The typical chevron-shaped system of Ohm's bright rays was easily noticeable during the approach of the gibbous moon, which was gradually showing its western hemisphere and the far side regions beyond 90° west.

Ohm crater captured in Earthset
