= Oceanus Procellarum =

Lunar plain on the western edge of near side of Earth's Moon

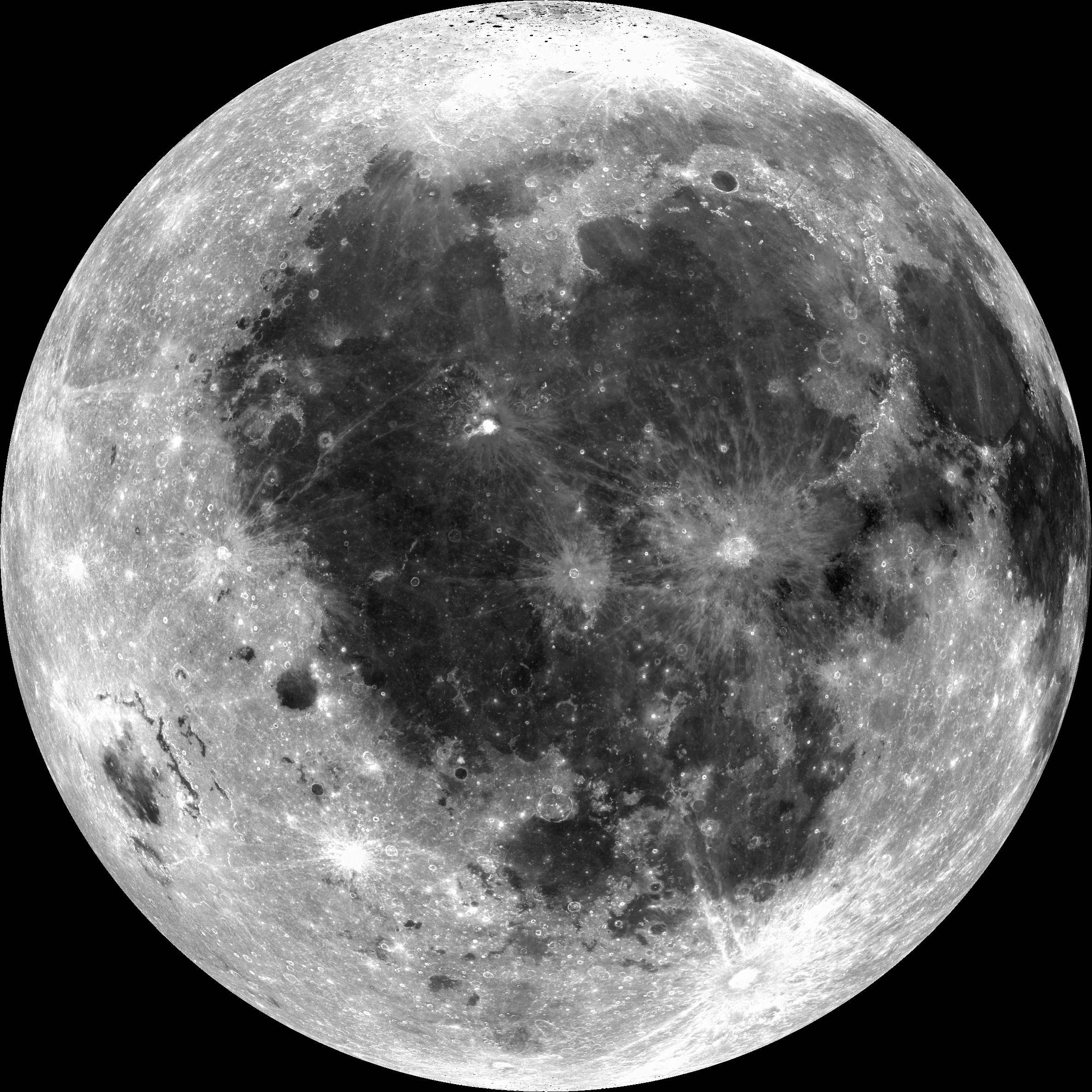
- Most of the dark region is Oceanus Procellarum and smaller maria, such as Imbrium and Serenitatis, that sit within its ring. Left of the centerline is Procellarum proper.
- Coordinates: 18.4°N 57.4°W
- Diameter: 2,592 km (1,611 mi)
- Eponym: Ocean of Storms

Oceanus Procellarum (/oʊˈsiːənəs ˌprɒsɛˈlɛərəm/ oh-SEE-ə-nəs PROSS-el-AIR-əm; from Latin: Ōceanus procellārum, lit. 'Ocean of Storms') is a vast lunar plain on the western edge of the near side of the Moon. It is the only one of the lunar plains to be called an "Oceanus" (ocean), due to its size: Oceanus Procellarum is the largest lunar plain, stretching more than 2,500 km (1,600 mi) across its north–south axis and covering roughly 4,000,000 km^{2} (1,500,000 sq mi), accounting for 10.5% of the total lunar surface area.

== Characteristics ==
Like lunar maria, Oceanus Procellarum was formed by ancient volcanic eruptions resulting in basaltic floods that covered the region in a thick, nearly flat layer of solidified magma. Basalts in Oceanus Procellarum have been estimated to be as young as one billion years old. Unlike the lunar maria, however, Oceanus Procellarum may or may not be contained within a single, well-defined impact basin.

Around its edges lie many minor bays and seas, including Sinus Roris to the north, and Mare Nubium, Mare Humorum and Sinus Viscositatis to the south. To the northeast, Oceanus Procellarum is separated from Mare Imbrium by the Carpathian Mountains. On its north-west edge lies the 32 km wide Aristarchus ray crater, the brightest feature on the Near side of the Moon. Also, the more-prominent ray-crater Copernicus lies within the eastern edge of the mare, distinct with its bright ray materials sprawling over the darker material.

== Origin ==
Moon – Oceanus Procellarum ("Ocean of Storms")

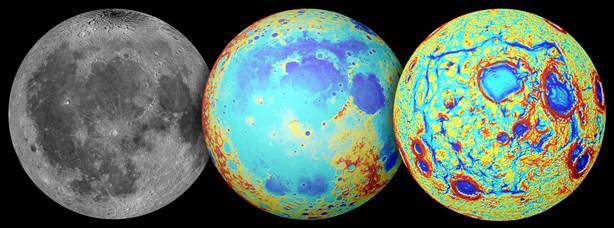
Ancient rift valleys – rectangular structure (visible – topography – GRAIL gravity gradients) (October 1, 2014)

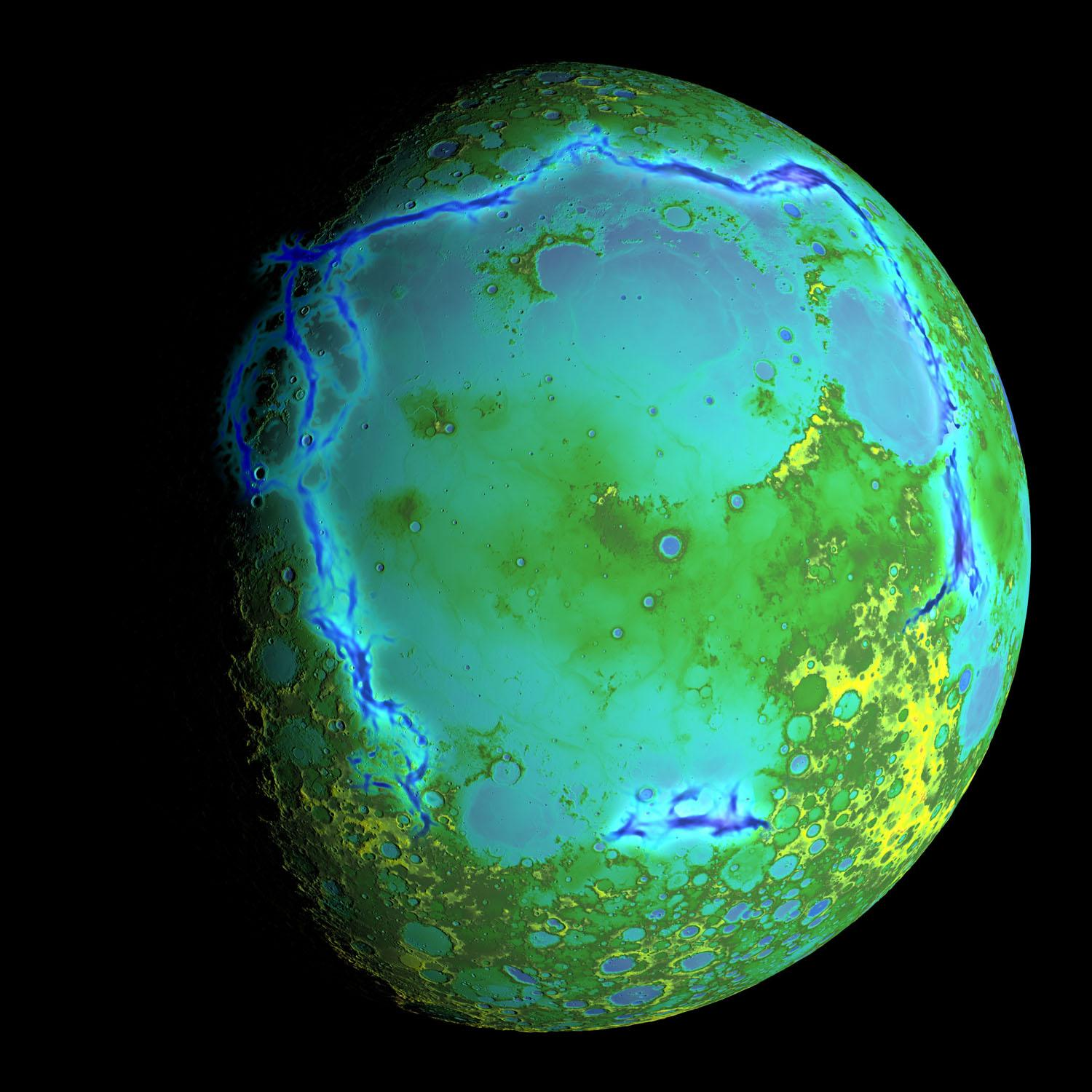
Ancient rift valleys – context

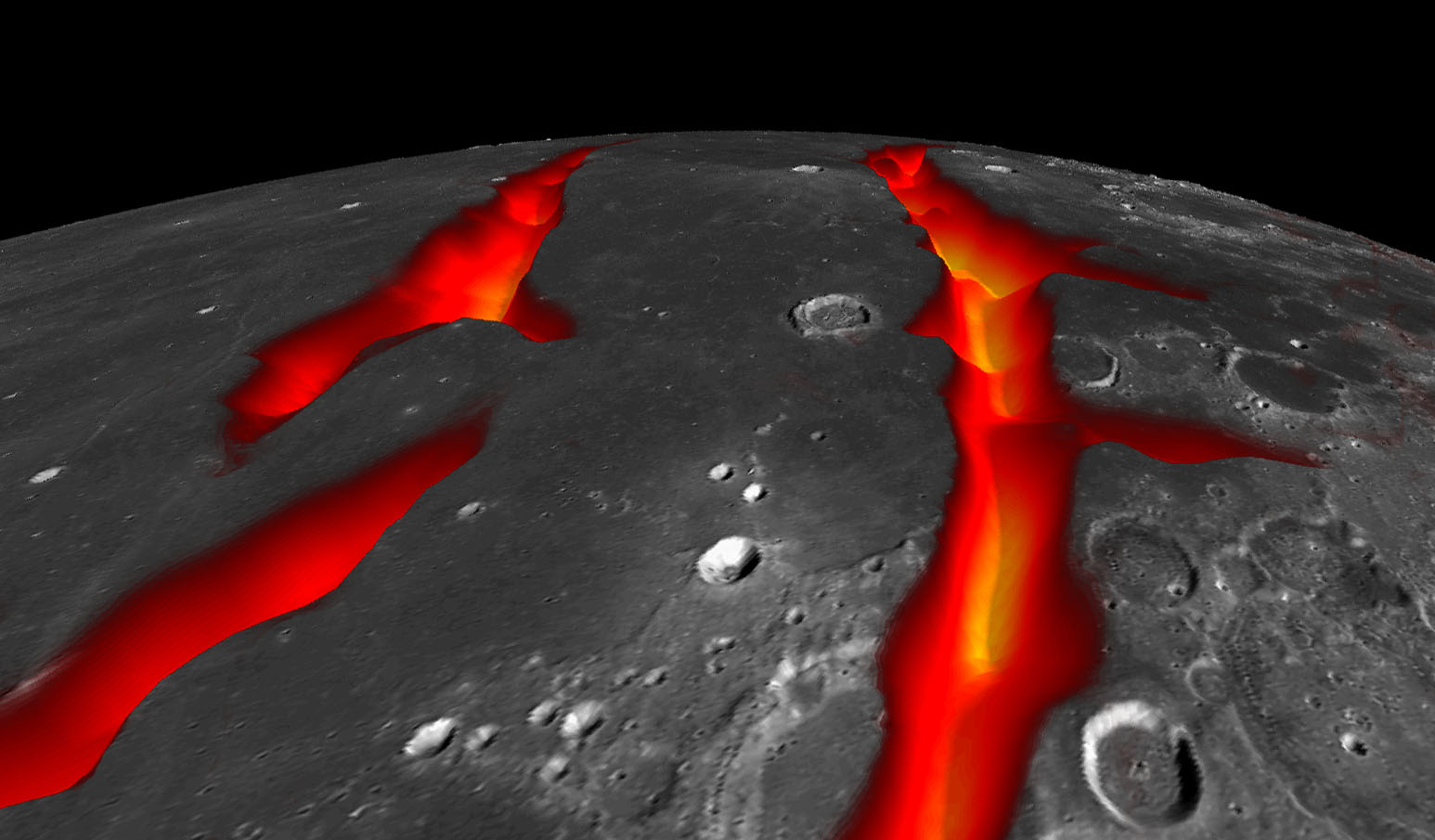
Ancient rift valleys – closeup (artist's concept)

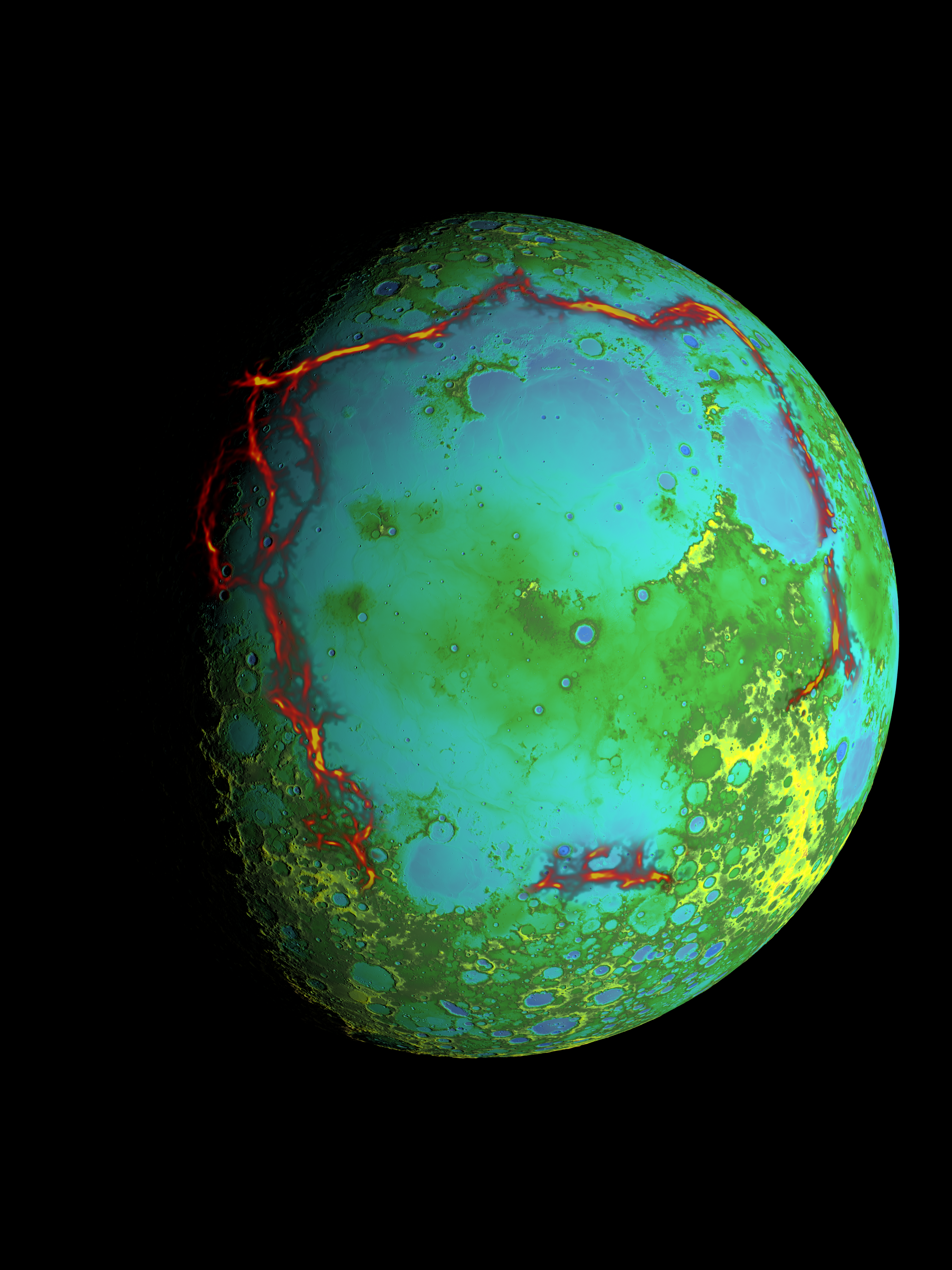
Gravity anomalies (red) bordering the Procellarum region overlaid on a global elevation map

There are several hypotheses about the origin of Oceanus Procellarum and a related asymmetry between the near and far sides of the Moon. One of the most likely is that Procellarum was a result of an ancient giant impact on the near side of the Moon. The size of the impact basin has been estimated to be more than 3,000 kilometers, which would make it one of the three largest craters in the Solar System.

The impact likely happened very early in the Moon's history: at the time when magma ocean still existed or had just ceased to exist. It deposited 5–30 km of crustal material on the far side forming highlands. If this is the case, all impact related structures such as crater rim, central peak etc. have been obliterated by later impacts and volcanism. One piece of evidence in support of this hypothesis is concentration of incompatible elements (KREEP) and low calcium pyroxene around Oceanus Procellarum.

Procellarum may have also been formed by spatially inhomogeneous heating during the Moon's formation. The GRAIL mission, which mapped the gravity gradients of the Moon, found square formations resembling rift valleys surrounding the region beneath the lava plains, suggesting the basin was formed by heating and cooling of the lunar surface by internal processes rather than by an impact, which would have left a round crater.

Other hypotheses include a late accretion of a companion Moon on the far side. The latter postulates that in addition to the present Moon, another smaller (about 1,200 km in diameter) moon was formed from debris of the giant impact. After a few tens of millions of years it collided with the Moon and due to a small collisional velocity simply piled up on one side of the Moon forming what is now known as far side highlands.

== Late lunar volcanism ==
Relatively recent (less than 2 bya) volcanic activity had been suspected in the Oceanus Procellarum due to the presence of relatively uneroded features. The 2020 Chang'e-5 sample return mission provided constraints on the age of Oceanus Procellarum, finding it to be 1963 ± 57 million years old – over a billion years younger than any other previously returned lunar sample. Late lunar volcanic activity was considered surprising as the Moon is much smaller than Earth; interior heat necessary for volcanism should have been lost three billion years ago, so volcanic rocks as late as those found in Oceanus Procellarum must require additional heat sources.

Previous studies suggested that Oceanus Procellarum should have high concentrations of the heat-producing elements such as potassium, thorium, and uranium (Note: due to the abundance of their radioactive isotopes providing heat from decay), but samples returned showed that the concentration of suspected radioactive elements is much lower than necessary to provide prolonged heating.

== Exploration ==
The robotic lunar probes Luna 9, Luna 13, Surveyor 1 and Surveyor 3 landed in Oceanus Procellarum. Luna 9 landed southwest of Galilaei crater in 1966. Luna 13 landed southeast of Seleucus crater, later in 1966. Surveyor 1 landed north of Flamsteed crater (within the larger Flamsteed P) in 1966, and Surveyor 3 landed in 1967. The Chinese probe Chang'e 5 landed at Statio Tianchuan on Mons Rümker in Oceanus Procellarum in December 2020 and collected 1.73 kg (3.8 lb) of lunar rock samples.

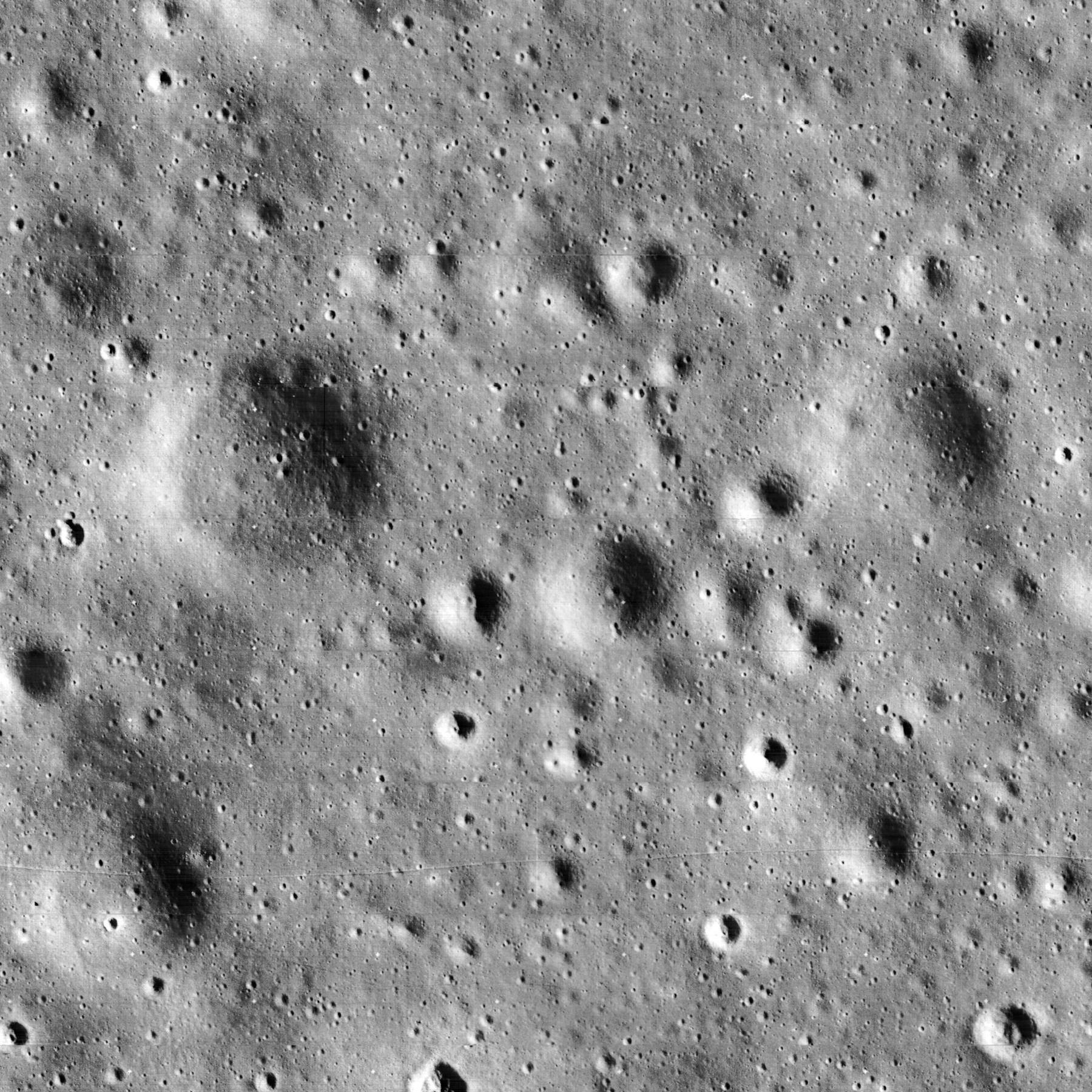
Image of Apollo 12 landing site (center) used in mission planning (1.75 × 1.75 km)

During the Apollo program, flight operations planners were concerned about having the optimum lighting conditions at the landing site, hence the alternative target sites moved progressively westward, following the terminator. A delay of two days for weather or equipment reasons would have sent Apollo 11 to Sinus Medii (designated ALS3) instead of ALS2—Mare Tranquillitatis; another two-day delay would have resulted in ALS5, a site in Oceanus Procellarum, being targeted.

During the November 1969 Apollo 12 mission, astronauts Pete Conrad and Alan Bean landed the Lunar Module Intrepid nearly 165 meters from Surveyor 3 in Oceanus Procellarum. Their landing site has become known as Statio Cognitum (Latin, "to be known from experience").

== The weak continuation of the eastern ray from farside crater Ohm ==
During very favourable libration of the moon's western rim, as seen from Earth, there is a possibility to observe the weak continuation of the eastern ray from farside crater Ohm. This continuation is located near craters Briggs, Lichtenberg, and Russell at the most northwestern section of Oceanus Procellarum. It is also noticeable on charts LAC 37 (page 74) and LAC 38 (page 76) in The Clementine Atlas of the Moon (Ben Bussey / Paul D. Spudis).

== In popular culture ==
- In the 2004 album Sirens by Greek metal band Astarte, there is a song named after Oceanus Procellarum.
- In the 2025 album The Study of Losses, by Beirut, there is a song named after Oceanus Procellarum.

== See also ==
- Apollo 18
- Human Lunar Return study
- Mare Cognitum
- Volcanism on the Moon
