= List of lunar pits =

This is a list of Lunar lava tubes and their entrances. The first atlas of lunar pits was published in 2021, and a number of catalogues have been published beginning in 2014.

== Legend ==
Mare pit in dark grey	Impact melt pit in silver	Highland pit in light grey

Pre-Nectarian in brown	Nectarian in red	Imbrian in coral	Eratosthenian in grey	Copernican in white

Natural bridge in yellow

== List of pits ==
Name	Line	Host	Depth	Diam.	Ramp	Overhang	Coordinates	Sources (Im.)
Adams B 1	/	Adams B	10.1	10 × ?	Y	?	31.4121°S 65.6408°E	
Adams B 2	/	Adams B	4.5	14 × ?	Y	?	31.5449°S 65.7223°E	
Adams B 3	?	Adams B	2.7	14 × ?	?	?	31.2886°S 65.7523°E	
Aristarchus 1	/	Aristarchus	12.6	27 × 10	N	?	23.8889°N 47.6494°W	
Aristarchus 2a	Aristarchus 2	Aristarchus	5.6	19 × 16	Y	?	23.873°N 47.6971°W	
Aristarchus 2b	Aristarchus 2	Aristarchus	16.3	13 × 7	N	?	23.8726°N 47.6947°W	
Aristarchus 2c	Aristarchus 2	Aristarchus	14.7	22 × 16	Y?	?	23.8716°N 47.6902°W	
Aristarchus 3a	Aristarchus 3	Aristarchus	16.5	25 × 18	N	N?	23.9331°N 47.5924°W	
Aristarchus 3b	Aristarchus 3	Aristarchus	11.2	18 × 8	N	N?	23.9339°N 47.5916°W	
Aristarchus 3c	Aristarchus 3	Aristarchus	7.5	16 × 8	Y?	?	23.9344°N 47.593°W	
Aristarchus 4	? (Note: Aristarchus 8 nearby)	Aristarchus	11.4	23 × 22	N	N?	23.914°N 47.6087°W	
Aristarchus 5	/	Aristarchus	17.8<	21 × 7	N	?	23.5984°N 47.5804°W	
Aristarchus 6	/	Aristarchus	11.6	12 × 7	N	?	23.4657°N 47.5765°W	
Aristarchus 7a	Aristarchus 7	Aristarchus	7.5	16 × 11	N?	?	23.4536°N 47.6033°W	
Aristarchus 7b	Aristarchus 7	Aristarchus	5.4	24 × 12	Y	?	23.4532°N 47.6043°W	
Aristarchus 8	? (Note: Aristarchus 4 nearby)	Aristarchus	8.1	28 × 23	Y	?	23.9091°N 47.6008°W	
Aristarchus 9	? (Note: Aristarchus 2c nearby and another pit-like depression 300 m SSE)	Aristarchus	7.5	17 × 10	N	?	23.8631°N 47.685°W	
Aristillus 1	/	Aristillus	11.6	11 × 10	N	N?	33.6622°N 0.7149°E	
Aristillus 2	?	Aristillus	18	16 × 9	N?	?	33.5874°N 1.019°E	
Aristillus 3	/	Aristillus	11.8	33 × 19	Y	?	33.5169°N 0.9128°E	
Aristillus 4	/	Aristillus	? (Note: A ~4 m wide inner pit may lie at the bottom, similar to the larger Southwest Mare Fecunditatis pit)	? × ?	N	?	33.4981°N 0.9447°E	
Catalán B 1	/	Catalán B	7.5	26 × 15	N	?	45.6547°S 88.574°W	
Central Mare Fecunditatis pit	/	Mare Fecunditatis	44	122 × 100	Y	N	0.9182°S 48.6595°E	(1|2|3)
Compton pit	/	Compton	40	110 × 92 (Note: similar shape to Mare Ingenii pit)	Y	?	56.2247°N 106.1955°E	
Copernicus 1	/	Copernicus	11.8	11 × 9	N	N?	9.9277°N 19.2545°W	
Copernicus 2	/	Copernicus	15.1	9 × 6	N	?	9.9308°N 19.2704°W	
Copernicus 3	? (Note: "There are a couple ~120m circular depressions in a line to the NW, but they could easily be very degraded impact craters")	Copernicus	9.1	13 × 10	Y	N	9.9929°N 19.2851°W	
Copernicus 4	? (Note: sinuous collapse ~1 km S)	Copernicus	26.3	89 × 49	N	Y	10.3288°N 20.3794°W	
Copernicus 5	/	Copernicus	10.6	13 × 7	N	?	9.0159°N 20.2549°W	
Copernicus 6a	Copernicus 6	Copernicus	12.8	10 × 9	N	?	10.1053°N 20.005°W	
Copernicus 6b	Copernicus 6 (Note: another possible collapse just SE of 6b)	Copernicus	14.4	10 × 8	N	?	10.1048°N 20.0048°W	
Copernicus 7	? (Note: small depression 18 m NE; a rounded mound (possible ooze dome) ~180 m NE)	Copernicus	21<	6 × 4	N	?	10.0763°N 19.9731°W	
Copernicus 8	? (Note: two subtle possible depressions to the SSE, Copernicus 9 being inside one of them)	Copernicus	13.2	57 × 21	Y	N	10.1462°N 20.0627°W	
Copernicus 9	? (Note: Copernicus 8 nearby)	Copernicus	12.5 m	10 × 7	Y	?	10.1385°N 20.0613°W	
Proclus 1b Copernicus 10	? (Note: NNW-SSE trending linear depression)	Copernicus	25.4	38 × 11	Y?	?	10.1083°N 20.0544°W	
Copernicus 11	? (Note: in a probable N-S trending depression)	Copernicus	14	8 × 4	N?	?	9.9726°N 19.2716°W	
Copernicus 12	/	Copernicus	18.9	15 × 10	N	?	9.5539°N 19.2749°W	
Copernicus 13a	Copernicus 13 (Note: in line with Copernicus 21)	Copernicus	13.8	14 × 6	N	?	10.1857°N 20.1273°W	
Copernicus 13b	Copernicus 13	Copernicus	7.3	5 × 5	Y?	?	10.1799°N 20.1189°W	
Copernicus 14	? (Note: tiny dark spot 1-3 m S; at SW end of linear depression; Copernicus 23 ~400 m N)	Copernicus	21.7	20 × 7	N	Y?	10.2215°N 20.0959°W	
Copernicus 16	/	Copernicus	15.1	73 × 71	Y	N?	9.4838°N 19.8384°W	
Copernicus 17a	Copernicus 17	Copernicus	7.5	25 × 15	Y	?	10.2403°N 20.3987°W	
Copernicus 17b	Copernicus 17	Copernicus	10<	10 × 3	N	?	10.2401°N 20.3988°W	
Copernicus 18	? (Note: <5 m pit-like darkspot ~150 m SW)	Copernicus	16.1	137 × 26	Y?	?	10.2933°N 20.4019°W	
Copernicus 19a	Copernicus 19	Copernicus	17.8<	11 × 3	N	?	10.1326°N 20.3948°W	
Copernicus 19b	Copernicus 19	Copernicus	14.1<	7 × 4	N	?	10.1329°N 20.3945°W	
Copernicus 20	? (Note: at SW end of a linear depression)	Copernicus	14.9	95 × 31	N	?	10.3522°N 20.2649°W	
Copernicus 21	? (Note: at E end of linear depression; Copernicus 13 nearby)	Copernicus	15.3	44 × 17	Y	N?	10.1943°N 20.153°W	
Copernicus 22	? (Note: at E end of circular depressions; linear depression running E of pit; Copernicus 23 nearby)	Copernicus	11.7<	17 × 3	N	?	10.2095°N 20.1127°W	
Copernicus 23	? (Note: at NW end of larger depression; linear depression starting ~1km SE; Copernicus 14, 13, X nearby)	Copernicus	9.4	9 × 6	Y	?	10.2067°N 20.1022°W	
Copernicus 24	? (Note: deep depression ~100 m SE along a possible linear depression)	Copernicus	19.5	85 × 52	Y	N?	10.181°N 19.5186°W	
Copernicus LB2	/	Copernicus	65	305 × 260	Y	?	10.0588°N 20.1962°W	
Copernicus LB3	/	Copernicus	66	385 × 315	Y	?	10.0954°N 20.0769°W	
Copernicus LB4	/	Copernicus	79	320 × 275	N?	N	10.2041°N 20.0015°W	
Copernicus LB5	/	Copernicus	50	270 × 220	Y	N	10.2349°N 20.3101°W	
Copernicus LB6	/	Copernicus	64	250 × 225	Y	N?	10.3127°N 20.2737°W	
Crookes 1	? (Note: deep fractures to the N and S; some depressions past E end)	Crookes	20.5	213 × 67	Y?	?	10.2424°S 165.2464°W	
Crookes 2	? (Note: in line with fractures 125 and 250 m SW; another fracture/depression string ~100 m N)	Crookes	10.6	18 × 11	Y	?	10.1275°S 165.2554°W	
Crookes 3	? (Note: tiny depression 15 m W; a larger depression 70 m E)	Crookes	10.7<	6 × 6	N	?	10.0749°S 165.2663°W	
Crookes 4	? (Note: depressions to the WSW; Crookes 11a nearby)	Crookes	25<	15 × 12	N	?	10.2294°S 165.2209°W	
Crookes 5a	Crookes 5 (Note: 2-3 collapses ~75 m W)	Crookes	12	22 × 22	Y	?	10.6859°S 165.1391°W	
Crookes 5b	Crookes 5	Crookes	11.8	? × 5	Y?	?	10.6825°S 165.1388°W	
Crookes 5c	Crookes 5 (Note: collapse to the W possibly overhanging but possibly like the not-bridges in King crater)	Crookes	10	45 × 34	Y	Y?	10.6824°S 165.1354°W	
Crookes 5d	Crookes 5	Crookes	9.9	4 × 4	N	?	10.6824°S 165.1374°W	
Crookes 6	? (Note: possible collapse depression ~35 m ESE)	Crookes	20.8	17 × 9	N	?	10.0854°S 165.1298°W	
Crookes 7	/	Crookes	8.6	20 × 19	N	?	10.5592°S 165.177°W	
Crookes 9	? (Note: Crookes 10 nearby)	Crookes	12.8	26 × 22	Y?	?	10.1715°S 165.1625°W	
Crookes 10	? (Note: Crookes 9 nearby; a few minor collapses ~100 m W)	Crookes	10.7	30 × 12	Y	?	10.1717°S 165.1698°W	
Crookes 11a	Crookes 11 (Note: Crookes 4 nearby; more depressions NNE)	Crookes	9.7	41 × 25	Y	?	10.2353°S 165.217°W	
Crookes 11b	Crookes 11	Crookes	12	28 × 26	Y	?	10.2372°S 165.2178°W	
Das 1a	Das 1	Das	15.3<	21 × 5	Y	?	26.3088°S 136.7397°W	
Das 1b	Das 1	Das	10.8	6 × 5	Y?	?	26.3098°S 136.7401°W	
Das 2	? (Note: possible pit 25 m E)	Das	4.5<	14 × 5	N	?	26.2518°S 136.9094°W	
Das 3	? (Note: ~3 m possible pit 70 m NW; NNW/SSE depression line ~300 m W)	Das	8.4<	18 × 13	N?	Y	26.2963°S 136.9271°W	
Das 4a	Das 4	Das	5.6	18 × 17	Y	?	26.4088°S 137.212°W	
Das 4b	Das 4	Das	5.1<	? × ?	?	?	26.4148°S 137.2127°W	
Das 4c	Das 4	Das	5.2<	4 × 2	?	?	26.4151°S 137.2136°W	
Das 4d	Das 4	Das	7.7<	9 × 6	Y	?	26.4189°S 137.2093°W	
Das 4e	Das 4	Das	6.4	? × ?	Y?	?	26.4126°S 137.2013°W	
Dollond E 1a	Dollond E 1 (Note: ~4 m dark spots 5 and 10 m NE)	Dollond E	58<[-80<]	36 × 25	N	N?	10.2737°S 15.7013°E	
Dollond E 1b	Dollond E 1 (Note: ~5 m dark spot ~10 m S)	Dollond E	32.2	17 × ?	N	?	10.275°S 15.7004°E	
Dollond E 1c	Dollond E 1	Dollond E	38.4	12 × 11	N	Y	10.275°S 15.6998°E	
Dollond E 1d	Dollond E 1	Dollond E	15	11 × ?	N?	?	10.2738°S 15.7035°E	
Fraunhofer G 1	? (Note: ~7 m deep collapse ~25 m S; shallow collapses ~75 m W and ~200 m E)	Fraunhofer G	6.6<	17 × 11	N	?	38.5001°S 58.3638°E	
Harriot 1	/	Harriot	12.1	27 × 25	Y	?	33.2933°N 114.2911°E	
Hayn 1	/	Hayn	7<	? × ?	Y?	?	65.2233°N 84.2004°E	
Highland 1 pit	/	Grandinis highland	26.9	41 × 37	N	N?	43.9662°N 23.0836°E	
Highland 2 pit	/	Grandinis highland	24.6<	34 × 27	N	N?	41.1563°N 18.8206°E	
Highland 3	? (Note: ~10 km from mare edge)	Pruinae highland	27.5	45 × 41	N	N?	42.3941°N 39.6924°W	
Jackson 1a	Jackson 1	Jackson	15	13 × 8	N?	?	22.4208°N 163.7132°W	
Jackson 1b	Jackson 1	Jackson	20.9	30 × 26	Y?	Y?	22.4191°N 163.7172°W	
Jackson 1c	Jackson 1	Jackson	18.2	? × 31	Y	?	22.4214°N 163.7093°W	
Jackson 2a	Jackson 2	Jackson	8.3	25 × 15	Y?	?	22.4967°N 163.7186°W	(Note: ˙)
Jackson 2b	Jackson 2	Jackson	14.7	11 × 9	N	?	22.4967°N 163.7186°W	(Note: ˙)
Jackson 3	/	Jackson	18.6	18 × 11	N	?	22.1992°N 162.8507°W	(Note: ˙)
Jackson 4	/	Jackson	8.9	9 × 5	N	Y?	21.7636°N 162.8803°W	(Note: ˙)
Jackson 5	? (Note: possible 5 m wide collapse 8 m SW)	Jackson	19.4<	11 × 9	N	?	22.3063°N 162.9147°W	(Note: ˙)
Jackson 6	? (Note: linear depression ~40 m wide 175 m N)	Jackson	7.7	13 × 13	N?	?	22.4434°N 162.7447°W	(Note: ˙)
Kepler 1	? (Note: shallow linear depression to the NW)	Kepler	11.4	25 × 12	N?	?	8.2745°N 37.9499°W	(Note: ˙)
Kepler 2	? (Note: large open fracture ~250 m NE; arc of small fractures running SW/E within 75 m S)	Kepler	6.5	6 × 5 (Note: Tranquillitatis type pit)	N	?	8.2724°N 37.9752°W	(Note: ˙)
King 34b Kepler 3	/	Kepler	11.7	14 × 8	Y?	?	8.1636°N 37.9551°W	(Note: ˙)
Kepler 4a	Kepler 4 (Note: Kepler 4b is ~200 m E; band of depressions WSW-ENE ~100 m N)	Kepler	19	56 × 38	Y	?	7.946°N 37.8637°W	(Note: ˙)
King 1a	King 1 (Note: string of small pits connected by depressions ~100 m N; string of small depressions ~220 m S)	King Y	12.1	27 × 18	N?	Y	6.2408°N 119.7341°E	(Note: ˙˙)
King 1b	King 1	King Y	12.1	28 × 18	N	Y	6.2402°N 119.7351°E	(Note: ˙˙)
King 2a (Note: King 37 nearby; fractures running N)	King 2	King Y	9.6	12 × 12	Y	N?	6.3808°N 119.9992°E	(Note: ˙)
King 2b	King 2	King Y	10.5	15 × 9	Y	N?	6.3802°N 119.9972°E	(Note: ˙)
King 3a	King 3 (Note: ~75 m long fracture with 15 m wide pit ~100 m NW)	King Y	4.3	7 × 6	Y	?	6.4082°N 119.8108°E	(Note: ˙)
King 3b	King 3	King Y	8.2	6 × 4	N	?	6.4081°N 119.8105°E	(Note: ˙)
King 4a	King 4 (Note: probably another collapse ~20 m SE)	King Y	5.8	20 × 16	N?	Y	6.2066°N 119.7815°E	(Note: ˙)
King 4b	King 4 (Note: a 45 m long depression with a pair of <5 m pits in it ~200 m SW)	King Y	7.2	15 × 14	Y	?	6.2061°N 119.7804°E	(Note: ˙)
King 5	/ (Note: pair of fractures ~70 m S at N end of a string of subtle depressions running NNW-SSE)	King Y	9.6	16 × 13	N	N?	6.3371°N 119.8005°E	(Note: ˙)
King 6	? (Note: a ~10x1 m pit 21 m W (and other linear features SSW from there); a ~5x3 m pit 125 m NE; a pair of pits 4 m apart 130 m N)	King Y	9.4	7 × 6	N	?	6.2776°N 119.7247°E	(Note: ˙)
King 7	? (Note: several <5 m pits ~120 and ~230 m N)	King Y	8.4	14 × 11	N	?	6.467°N 119.7378°E	(Note: ˙)
King 8a	King 8 (Note: several short fractures or strings of small collapses in the area)	King Y	7.4	12 × 10	N	?	6.4369°N 119.8329°E	(Note: ˙)
King 8b	King 8	King Y	15.1	6 × 6	N	Y?	6.4365°N 119.8335°E	(Note: ˙)
King 8c	King 8	King Y	4.8	7 × 5	N	?	6.4412°N 119.8331°E	(Note: ˙)
King 9a	King 9 (Note: pair of small pits just S)	King Y	4	22 × 11	Y?	?	6.2281°N 119.5237°E	(Note: ˙)
King 9b	King 9	King Y	9.6	8 × 7	N	?	6.2281°N 119.5214°E	(Note: ˙)
King 10	/	King Y	6.9	15 × 13	Y	?	6.2504°N 119.5464°E	(Note: ˙)
King 11a	King 11 (Note: fracture system running E-W ~80 m N)	King Y	7.9	29 × 26	N	?	6.4593°N 120.0017°E	(Note: ˙)
King 11b	King 11	King Y	5.6	12 × 7	Y	? (Note: N/NE wall sloped)	6.4604°N 120.0023°E	(Note: ˙)
King 12	? (Note: shallow depression 13 m W; pits ~300 m NW and ~280 m W)	King Y	9.2	26 × 22	Y	Y	6.2487°N 119.7506°E	(Note: ˙)
King 13a	King 13 (Note: NNW-SSE trending depression in line with King 13; depression 14 m W of King 13b)	King Y	11.5	22 × 15	Y	?	6.2538°N 119.7626°E	(Note: ˙)
King 13b	King 13	King Y	7.4<	7 × 5	N	?	6.2551°N 119.7615°E	(Note: ˙)
King 14	? (Note: in a set of N-S trending fractures and pits joined by depressions)	King Y	16	48 × 38	N	Y	6.2784°N 119.7635°E	(Note: ˙)
King 15a	King 15 (Note: <5 m probable pits joined by depressions ~75 m WSW; a collapse ~40 m SE; sub-5 m pits ~100 m SE and ~110 m SSW)	King Y	5.5	13 × 9	Y	N?	6.4782°N 119.7847°E	(Note: ˙)
King 15b	King 15	King Y	4.4	12 × 7	N	N?	6.4781°N 119.7853°E	(Note: ˙)
King 16	? (Note: at N end of ~200 m long depression; a ~6 m wide pit ~115 m SW along this fracture; King 38 nearby)	King Y	18.9	47 × 29	N	N?	6.3643°N 119.9304°E	(Note: ˙)
King 17	? (Note: King 18 and King 39 nearby; other small pit-like features nearby)	King Y	4.9	10 × 7	N	?	6.6252°N 119.9847°E	(Note: ˙)
King 18	? (Note: a depression starts ~20 m S and runs ~130 m SSE; King 17 nearby; other pit-like features nearby)	King Y	9.5	14 × 12	Y?	?	6.6235°N 119.9894°E	(Note: ˙)
King 19	? (Note: other collapses 16 m NNW, 24 m SSE, and 23 m SSW; small pit-like features nearby including a cluster ~300 m N)	King Y	4.5	13 × 11	N	Y	6.5931°N 119.9861°E	(Note: ˙˙)
King 20a	King 20 (Note: shallow collapse at E base) (Note: shallow pit just S) (Note: some ~5 m pits to the S)	King Y	14	22 × 12	N	?	6.5098°N 119.9269°E	(Note: ˙)
King 20b	King 20 (Note: narrow collapse due N)	King Y	5.4	23 × 23	Y	?	6.5108°N 119.9289°E	(Note: ˙)
King 20c	King 20	King Y	8<	14 × 3	N	?	6.513°N 119.9269°E	(Note: ˙)
King 20d	King 20 (Note: narrow collapse due E)	King Y	5.5	19 × 7	N	?	6.5142°N 119.9266°E	(Note: ˙)
King 20e	King 20	King Y	5.5	6 × 4	N	?	6.5149°N 119.9298°E	(Note: ˙)
King 20f	King 20	King Y	6.1	10 × 5	N	?	6.5153°N 119.9282°E	(Note: ˙)
King 20g	King 20	King Y	4.4	5 × 4	N	?	6.5165°N 119.9304°E	(Note: ˙)
King 20h	King 20 (Note: some ~5 m pits to the N)	King Y	5<	6 × 2	N	?	6.5183°N 119.9299°E	(Note: ˙)
King 21	? (Note: several fractures in a line from NW to SE; King 31 nearby)	King Y	6.3	15 × 9	N	?	6.517°N 119.9875°E	(Note: ˙)
King 22	? (Note: two sets of fractures ~40 m N and ~180 m S; 2 ~5 m wide depressions running W from the W end of this pit; King 40 nearby)	King Y	6.6	25 × 18	Y	?	6.4835°N 119.9941°E	(Note: ˙)
King 23	/	King Y	8.7	15 × 9	N	Y?	6.3794°N 119.9019°E	(Note: ˙)
King 24a	King 24 (Note: one collpse ~220 m SE; one collapse ~170 m SW; other small collapses to the S; King 30 nearby)	King Y	2.4	7 × 5	N?	?	6.3416°N 119.9914°E	(Note: ˙˙)
King 24b	King 24	King Y	4.5	20 × 14	N	?	6.34°N 119.9907°E	(Note: ˙˙)
King 24c	King 24	King Y	7.8	12 × 10	N	?	6.3389°N 119.9913°E	(Note: ˙˙)
King 25	? (Note: in a fracture system ~60 m W, ~40 m E, ~120 m S)	King Y	7.8	12 × 8	N	?	6.2691°N 119.9429°E	(Note: ˙)
King 26 (Note: depression ~225 m NE; collapses ~275 m WNW; King 41 nearby)	/	King Y	6.3	14 × 11	N	?	6.6385°N 119.82°E	(Note: ˙˙)
King 27	? (Note: fractures S and E)	King Y	8.7	6 × 4	N	?	6.5044°N 119.8719°E	(Note: ˙)
King 28	? (Note: King 28 is a linear collapse; several small pits ~40m N; other shallow collapses in area)	King Y	24.4	156 × 15	Y	?	6.3016°N 119.8593°E	(Note: ˙)
King 29	? (Note: 20x2m fracture ~130m SW; linear NE-SW depressions ~60m NW)	King Y	6.4	14 × 11	N	?	6.4827°N 119.8145°E	(Note: ˙)
King 30	? (Note: in a collapse field; King 24c ~150m NNW; King 3a ~135m NE; other collapses nearby)	King Y	6.1	13 × 8	Y?	?	6.3339°N 119.9937°E	(Note: ˙)
King 31	? (Note: short fractures ~250m W, ~200m SW; King 21 ~165m S)	King Y	4.7	9 × 6	N?	?	6.5229°N 119.9879°E	(Note: ˙)
King 32	? (Note: in group of NW-SE fractures)	King Y	6	12 × 11	Y	?	6.3231°N 119.8067°E	(Note: ˙)
King 33	? (Note: only non-pit collapses nearby)	King Y	6.4	15 × 11	N	?	6.4873°N 119.6998°E	(Note: ˙)
King 34a	King 34 (Note: King 24c ~175m WNW; King 30 ~125m SW; King 42 ~290m ESE; <5m pits nearby)	King Y	6.7	34 × 12	Y	Y?	6.3372°N 119.9975°E	(Note: ˙)
King 34b	King 34	King Y	4.4	13 × 10	Y?	?	6.3361°N 119.9972°E	(Note: ˙)
King 35	? (Note: small pit ~20m W; E-W fractures ~100-150m S)	King Y	6.1	35 × 24	Y	?	6.4417°N 119.7252°E	(Note: ˙)
King 36	/	King Y	11.6	46 × 40	Y?	?	6.214°N 119.7664°E	(Note: ˙)
King 37	? (Note: King 2 ~200m E)	King Y	9.6	14 × 9	N	Y?	6.3814°N 120.0056°E	(Note: ˙)
King 38	? (Note: ~100m long NW-SE facture ~100m NW; ~50m long fracture ~130m N; King 16 ~200m SE)	King Y	8.2	24 × 11	Y	?	6.37°N 119.9252°E	(Note: ˙)
King 39	? (Note: King 17 ~165m S; collapse ~150m E; severl smaller pits nearby)	King Y	7.3	5 × 4	N	?	6.6308°N 119.9842°E	(Note: ˙)
King 40	? (Note: King 22 ~185m NW; ~2m pit E of E corner; divot line WSW passing through collapse ~120m W then joining fracture line ~180m W)	King Y	6.2	26 × 17	Y	?	6.4779°N 119.9976°E	(Note: ˙)
King 41	? (Note: NW-SE linear depression ~60m N; King 26 ~300m W)	King Y	5.2	12 × 5	Y	?	6.6376°N 119.8299°E	(Note: ˙)
King 42	? (Note: King 34a ~290m WNW; depression ~100m SE; several small NW-SE collapses to E)	King Y	7.8	16 × 10	Y	?	6.2281°N 119.5214°E	(Note: ˙)
Klute W 1	? (Note: possible fracture starting ~100m N; possible linear depression ~200m E)	Klute W	6.6	16 × 10	Y?	Y?	38.086°N 143.115°W	(Note: ˙)
Klute W 2	? (Note: in ~80m long depression; at NNE-SSW cluster of linear features; Klute W 6 ~300m NNE; ~40m linear fracture ~60m NW; ~60m S-shaped fracture ~150m N)	Klute W	6.4	12 × 9	Y	?	38.1157°N 143.1035°W	(Note: ˙)
Klute W 3	? (Note: Klute W 5 ~200m SE; Klute W 5 ~200m SE; ~200m NW of NNE-SSW 50m-long fracture)	Klute W	6	18 × 13	Y	?	38.098°N 143.0615°W	(Note: ˙)
Klute W 4	? (Note: N of ~60m linear depression; another ~60m segment ~70m NE; ~150m linear depression ~100m SE)	Klute W	>7.9	6 × 5	N	Y?	37.8581°N 143.1089°W	(Note: ˙)
Klute W 5	? (Note: ~20m NW of Klute W 3; ~150m SE of cliff)	Klute W	2.1	5 × 4	Y?	?	38.1018°N 143.0677°W	(Note: ˙)
Klute W 6	? (Note: in NE-SW fracture series; Klute W 2 ~300m SSW)	Klute W	7	28 × 12	Y	?	38.1256°N 143.099°W	(Note: ˙)
Lacus Mortis pit (LMP)	? (Note: graben ~1km NW, large potential pit ~10km WSW over the graben)	Lacus Mortis	60	7 × ?	Y	Y	44.9608°N 25.6119°E	(Note: ˙˙˙˙) (1)
Lacus Mortis 2	?	Lacus Mortis	115	290 × 270			44.815°N 25.201°E	
Lalande 1	? (Note: parallel fracture pair ~280m SW; small possible pit ~280m NW)	Lalande	7.8	7 × ?	Y	?	4.4579°S 8.5333°W	(Note: ˙)
Lalande 2	? (Note: in NE-SW fracture; 90m linear fracture 250m SE; other small collapses nearby)	Lalande	7	19 × 12	Y?	?	4.4949°S 8.50080000000003°W	(Note: ˙)
Lalande 3a	Lalande 3 (Note: heavily fractured region ~135m NE; sub-5m possible pits E)	Lalande	7.6	8 × 7	N	?	4.5322°S 8.51069999999999°W	(Note: ˙)
Lalande 3b	Lalande 3	Lalande	4	28 × 23	Y?	?	4.5328°S 8.51049999999998°W	(Note: ˙)
Lalande 3c	Lalande 3	Lalande	7.2	16 × 15	N	?	4.5312°S 8.50999999999999°W	(Note: ˙)
Lalande 5a	? (Note: small collapses 15 and 50m NW, 135m E)	Lalande	5.4	7 × 6	N?	?	4.3408°S 8.57709999999997°W	(Note: ˙)
Lalande 12	? (Note: on E edge of possible fracture field; shallow pit pair ~250m SE; complex fracture set ~150m SW)	Lalande	11.3	8 × 4	N	?	4.4275°S 8.5564°W	(Note: ˙)
Lalande 13	? (Note: at end of ~100m linear depression in set of parallel depressions)	Lalande	9	13 × 10	N	?	4.3571°S 8.69459999999998°W	(Note: ˙)
Mare Ingenii pit (MIP)	/	Mare Ingenii	55	104 × 71	N	Y	35.9494°S 166.0559°E	(Note: ˙˙˙˙˙) (1)
Mare Insularum pit	? (Note: unusual feature ~9km NW)	Mare Insularum	62.8	? × 159	Y	N	8.6861°N 29.0335°W	(Note: ˙˙)
Mare Moscoviense pit	/	Mare Moscoviense	40	175 × 160	Y	N	29.5025°N 150.4647°E	(Note: ˙˙)
Mare Serenitatis pit	/	Mare Serenitatis	>26	21 × 17	N	?	35.1041°N 17.4017°E	(Note: ˙˙)
Mare Tranquillitatis pit (MTP)	/	Mare Tranquillitatis	105	100 × 88	N	Y	8.3355°N 33.222°E	(Note: ˙˙˙˙˙) (1)
Marius Hills pit	? (Note: in ALSR Rille 40; West Marius Hills pit ~45km WSW)	Marius Hills	40	55 × 49	N	Y	14.0917°N 56.7701°W	(Note: ˙˙˙˙) (1)
Messier A 1	? (Note: larger fracture pits ~200m SW)	Messier	15.2	8 × 4	N?	?	2.0279°S 46.8995°E	(Note: ˙)
Messier A 2a	Messier A 2 (Note: larger fracture pits ~150m NW)	Messier	5.2	20 × 17	N	?	2.014°S 46.9059°E	(Note: ˙)
Messier A 2b	Messier A 2 (Note: Messier A 1 ~350m S; larger fracture pits ~150m NW)	Messier	11.8	5 × 4	N	?	2.0166°S 46.9017°E	(Note: ˙)
Messier A 4a	Messier A 4	Messier	16	22 × 9	N	?	2.044°S 46.8825°E	(Note: ˙)
Messier A 4b	Messier A 4	Messier	>23	16 × 13	N	?	2.0459°S 46.8839°E	(Note: ˙)
Milichius A 1	/	Milichius A	9	17 × 9	Y?	?	9.2642°N 32.0732°W	(Note: ˙˙)
North Procellarum 1 pit	? (Note: North Procellarium 2 ~2km WSW)	Oceanus Procellarum	54.2	157 × 108	N?	?	35.4097°N 45.6398°W	(Note: ˙˙)
North Procellarum 2 pit	? (Note: North Procellarium 1 ~2km NNE)	Oceanus Procellarum	43.9	160 × 155	Y	N	35.3433°N 45.6553°W	(Note: ˙˙)
O'Day 1	/	O'Day	>7.6	17 × 9	N?	?	30.9692°S 158.0535°E	(Note: ˙)
O'Day 2	/	O'Day	4.1	14 × 12	Y?	?	30.9463°S 158.0644°E	(Note: ˙)
Ohm 1	/	Ohm	>16.5	15 × 13	N	Y?	18.0805°N 113.6813°W	(Note: ˙)
Ohm 2	/	Ohm	15.6	12 × ?	Y?	?	18.6687°N 113.5859°W	(Note: ˙)
Palitzsch B 1	/	Palitzsch B	13	15 × 14	N	?	26.3162°S 68.1911°E	(Note: ˙˙)
Philolaus 1	/	Philolaus	8	? × ?	N	?	72.4657°N 31.4196°W	(Note: ˙˙)
Picard 1	/	Picard	>8.0	12 × 8	?	?	14.4714°N 54.6591°E	(Note: ˙˙)
Proclus 1a	Proclus 1	Proclus	10.7	33 × 18	N	N?	16.2972°N 46.8941°E	(Note: ˙)
Proclus 1b	Proclus 1	Proclus	12.8	36 × 23	Y?	?	16.2959°N 46.8916°E	(Note: ˙)
Runge pit	/	Runge	4.9	14 × 12	N	?	2.7024°S 86.78°E	(Note: ˙˙˙)
Rutherfurd 1a	Rutherfurd 1	Rutherfurd	4.7	14 × 13	Y?	?	60.7788°S 11.8124°W	(Note: ˙)
Rutherfurd 1b	Rutherfurd 1	Rutherfurd	>2.8	9 x ?	Y	?	60.7789°S 11.8138°W	(Note: ˙)
Rutherfurd 2	/	Rutherfurd	8.9	24 × 19	Y	?	60.7757°S 11.747°W	(Note: ˙)
Rutherfurd 3	/	Rutherfurd	3.3	18 × 8	Y	?	60.7751°S 11.7924°W	(Note: ˙)
Schlüter pit (SCP)	/	Schlüter	58.2	37 × 23	N	Y	5.8395°S 83.05°W	(Note: ˙˙˙)
Schomberger A 1	/	Schomberger A	>1.4	10 × 6	N	?	78.0579°S 25.3441°E	(Note: ˙)
Sharonov 1a	Sharonov 1	Sharonov	>13.8	7 × 6	N	?	12.5745°N 173.4036°E	(Note: ˙)
Sharonov 1b	Sharonov 1	Sharonov	6.7	7 × 6	Y	?	12.5762°N 173.4015°E	(Note: ˙)
Sinus Iridum pit	/	Sinus Iridum	15.2	66 × 32	Y	?	45.623°N 28.811°W	(Note: ˙˙)
Southwest Mare Fecunditatis pit (SWFP)	/	Mare Fecunditatis	50.9	19 × 15	N	Y	6.7521°S 42.7595°E	(Note: ˙˙˙˙˙)
Southwest Mare Tranquillitatis pit	/	Mare Tranquillitatis	>25.2	18 × 10	N	?	4.1438°N 24.6867°E	(Note: ˙˙)
Southwest Mare Tranquillitatis B pit	/	Mare Tranquillitatis	12.8	32 × 26	N	?	4.1438°N 24.6871°E	(Note: ˙)
Stefan L 1	/	Stefan L	13	16 × ?	Y	?	44.537°N 107.9698°W	(Note: ˙)
Stefan L 2	/	Stefan L	10.1	20 × 19	N	?	44.4982°N 108.1656°W	(Note: ˙)
Stevinus 1	/	Stevinus	15.9	60 × 33	N	?	32.4259°S 54.6378°E	(Note: ˙˙)
Stevinus 2	/	Stevinus	>6.2	9 × 4	N	?	32.4828°S 54.5722°E	(Note: ˙)
Stevinus 3	/	Stevinus	9	15 × 6	Y	?	32.8592°S 54.0796°E	(Note: ˙)
Stevinus 4	/	Stevinus	8.2	11 × 10	N	?	32.7245°S 54.1735°E	(Note: ˙)
Stevinus 5	/	Stevinus	7.5	6 × 6	N?	Y?	32.4519°S 54.6746°E	(Note: ˙)
Stevinus 6	/	Stevinus	7.4	7 × 4	N	?	32.3828°S 54.6579°E	(Note: ˙)
Stevinus 7	/	Stevinus	>6.3	7 × 4	Y	?	32.3554°S 54.7126°E	(Note: ˙)
Stevinus 8	/	Stevinus	>6	5 × 4	Y?	?	32.3088°S 54.6614°E	(Note: ˙)
Stevinus 9a	Stevinus 9	Stevinus	5.6	7 × 7	Y?	?	32.9401°S 54.7446°E	(Note: ˙)
Stevinus 9b	Stevinus 9	Stevinus	>9.3	6 × 4	N	?	32.9401°S 54.7446°E	(Note: ˙)
Stevinus 10	? (Note: 200m from Stevinus 9)	Stevinus	4.9	7 × 5	Y	?	32.9383°S 54.7378°E	(Note: ˙)
Stevinus 11	/	Stevinus	>6.1	6 × 4	Y?	?	32.3302°S 54.7743°E	(Note: ˙)
Stevinus 12	/	Stevinus	6.1	24 × 18	N	N?	32.3174°S 54.746°E	(Note: ˙)
Stevinus 13	/	Stevinus	>4.1 m	4 × 4	N	?	32.449°S 54.6446°E	(Note: ˙)
Stevinus 14a	Stevinus 14	Stevinus	13.9	14 × 12	N	?	32.1634°S 54.7124°E	(Note: ˙)
Stevinus 14b	Stevinus 14	Stevinus	5	9 × 7	Y	?	32.1643°S 54.7118°E	(Note: ˙)
Stevinus 15	/	Stevinus	10.2	18 × 11	N?	?	32.3568°S 54.9433°E	(Note: ˙˙)
Stevinus 16	/	Stevinus	11.1	17 × 13	N	?	32.1817°S 54.5943°E	(Note: ˙)
Stevinus 17	/	Stevinus	7	5 × 4	Y	?	32.3695°S 53.6121°E	(Note: ˙)
Stevinus 18	/	Stevinus	5.9	9 × 9	N?	?	32.1226°S 54.8746°E	(Note: ˙)
Stevinus 19	/	Stevinus	>12.8	16 × 6	N	?	32.9337°S 53.7983°E	(Note: ˙)
Stevinus 22	/	Stevinus	10.1	38 × 35	N?	?	32.9349°S 53.9595°E	(Note: ˙)
Stevinus 23	/	Stevinus	>8.1	7 × 4	N	?	32.9642°S 54.0249°E	(Note: ˙)
Stevinus 24	/	Stevinus	4.4	? × ?	Y	?	32.7823°S 54.2992°E	(Note: ˙)
Stevinus 25	/	Stevinus	6	4 × 4	N	?	32.7393°S 54.2171°E	(Note: ˙)
Stevinus 26	/	Stevinus	>9.1	7 × 3	N	?	32.1328°S 54.865°E	(Note: ˙)
Tharp 1a	Tharp 1	Tharp	23.5	116 × 88	N?	?	30.6002°S 145.6809°E	(Note: ˙)
Tharp 1b	Tharp 1	Tharp	>16.2	21 × 10	N	?	30.5999°S 145.6841°E	(Note: ˙)
Tharp 2	/	Tharp	24	88 × 56	N	?	30.5395°S 145.5548°E	(Note: ˙)
Tharp 3	/	Tharp	17	31 × ?	Y	?	30.5713°S 145.6634°E	(Note: ˙)
Tharp 4	/	Tharp	9.3	10 × 8	N	?	30.6063°S 145.7057°E	(Note: ˙)
Tharp 5	/	Tharp	12.4	14 × 12	N	?	30.6106°S 145.7199°E	(Note: ˙)
Tycho 2	/	Tycho	2.7	6 × 6	N	Y?	42.5978°S 12.1804°W	(Note: ˙)
Tycho 3	/	Tycho	>6.1	18 × 9	Y	?	42.9449°S 12.2143°W	(Note: ˙˙)
Tycho 5a	Tycho 5	Tycho	21.6	31 × 21	Y?	?	42.6199°S 11.3668°W	(Note: ˙)
Tycho 5b	Tycho 5	Tycho	14.6	77 × 42	Y	?	42.6179°S 11.3637°W	(Note: ˙)
Tycho 5c	Tycho 5	Tycho	9.1	? × ?	N?	?	42.6152°S 11.3583°W	(Note: ˙)
Tycho 5d	Tycho 5	Tycho	9.8	62 × 37	N?	?	42.612°S 11.3517°W	(Note: ˙)
Tycho 5e	Tycho 5	Tycho	5.3	15 × 14	Y	?	42.6218°S 11.3628°W	(Note: ˙)
Tycho 6	/	Tycho	8.4	20 × 19	N	?	42.8894°S 10.6704°W	(Note: ˙)
Tycho 7	/	Tycho	>15.8	16 × 22	N	?	42.8468°S 11.4653°W	(Note: ˙)
Tycho 8	/	Tycho	>10.4	8 × 8	Y?	?	42.7882°S 11.2259°W	(Note: ˙)
Tycho 9	/	Tycho	10.6	58 × 16	Y	?	42.6506°S 10.4585°W	(Note: ˙˙)
Tycho 12	/	Tycho	16	34 × 16	Y	?	43.2169°S 10.4213°W	(Note: ˙)
Tycho 13	/	Tycho	11.3	33 × 27	Y	?	43.1399°S 11.7311°W	(Note: ˙)
Tycho 14	/	Tycho	>12.5	16 × 10	N	?	43.1467°S 10.9282°W	(Note: ˙)
Tycho 15a	Tycho 15	Tycho	3.9	18 × 9	N	?	43.1445°S 10.3668°W	(Note: ˙)
Tycho 15b	Tycho 15	Tycho	>9.1	26 × 6	N	?	43.1456°S 10.3675°W	(Note: ˙)
Tycho 16	/	Tycho	17.6	60 × 40	Y?	N?	43.102°S 12.2201°W	(Note: ˙)
Tycho 17a	Tycho 17	Tycho	16.3	72 × 42	Y?	?	43.0855°S 11.7578°W	(Note: ˙)
Tycho 17b	Tycho 17	Tycho	19.9	68 × 53	Y?	?	43.0794°S 11.7573°W	(Note: ˙)
Tycho 18	/	Tycho	17	61 × 40	N	?	43.2779°S 12.1741°W	(Note: ˙)
Tycho 19	/	Tycho	7	11 × 9	N	?	43.0996°S 10.5818°W	(Note: ˙)
Tycho 29a	Tycho 29	Tycho	>10.3	18 × 9	N	?	42.8468°S 11.4576°W	(Note: ˙)
Tycho 29b	Tycho 29	Tycho	9.3	14 × 9	Y?	?	42.8473°S 11.4585°W	(Note: ˙)
Tycho 29c	Tycho 29	Tycho	11.3	25 × 17	Y	?	42.8478°S 11.4595°W	(Note: ˙)
Virtanen F 1	/	Virtanen F	16.8	20 × 14	N?	?	15.7946°N 177.2069°E	(Note: ˙˙)
Wiener F 1	/	Wiener F	24.8	63 × 62	N	?	41.0722°N 149.9284°E	(Note: ˙˙)
West Marius Hills pit	/	Marius Hills	15.5	? × 47	Y	Y?	13.5507°N 58.1733°W	(Note: ˙˙˙)
Wood T 1a	Wood T 1	Wood T	11.1	40 × 25	Y	N?	43.8876°N 124.246°W	(Note: ˙)
Wood T 1b	Wood T 1	Wood T	10.8	17 × 14	N	Y?	43.8862°N 124.2387°W	(Note: ˙)
