= MHP =

MHP may refer to:

== Companies and organizations ==
- MHP Communications, public relations company based in London
- Mieschke Hofmann und Partner, a management and IT consultancy owned by Porsche
- Mississippi Highway Patrol, United States
- Montana Highway Patrol, United States
- Myronivsky Hliboproduct, a Ukrainian agricultural company
- Nationalist Movement Party (Milliyetçi Hareket Partisi), a Turkish political party
- Trade Union Federation for Professionals (formerly Vakcentrale Voor Middengroepen en Hoger Personeel), Netherlands

== Other uses ==
- Human processor model or model human processor, a cognitive modeling method
- Melissa Harris-Perry (TV series), an American current affairs and political commentary program
- Minsk-1 Airport, Belarus (IATA code)
- Multimedia Home Platform, an open middleware system standard for interactive digital television
- Maritime Helicopter Project, which led to the development of the Sikorsky CH-148 Cyclone
- Marius Hills Pit, a lunar pit cave
