= Furnerius (crater) =

Crater on the Moon

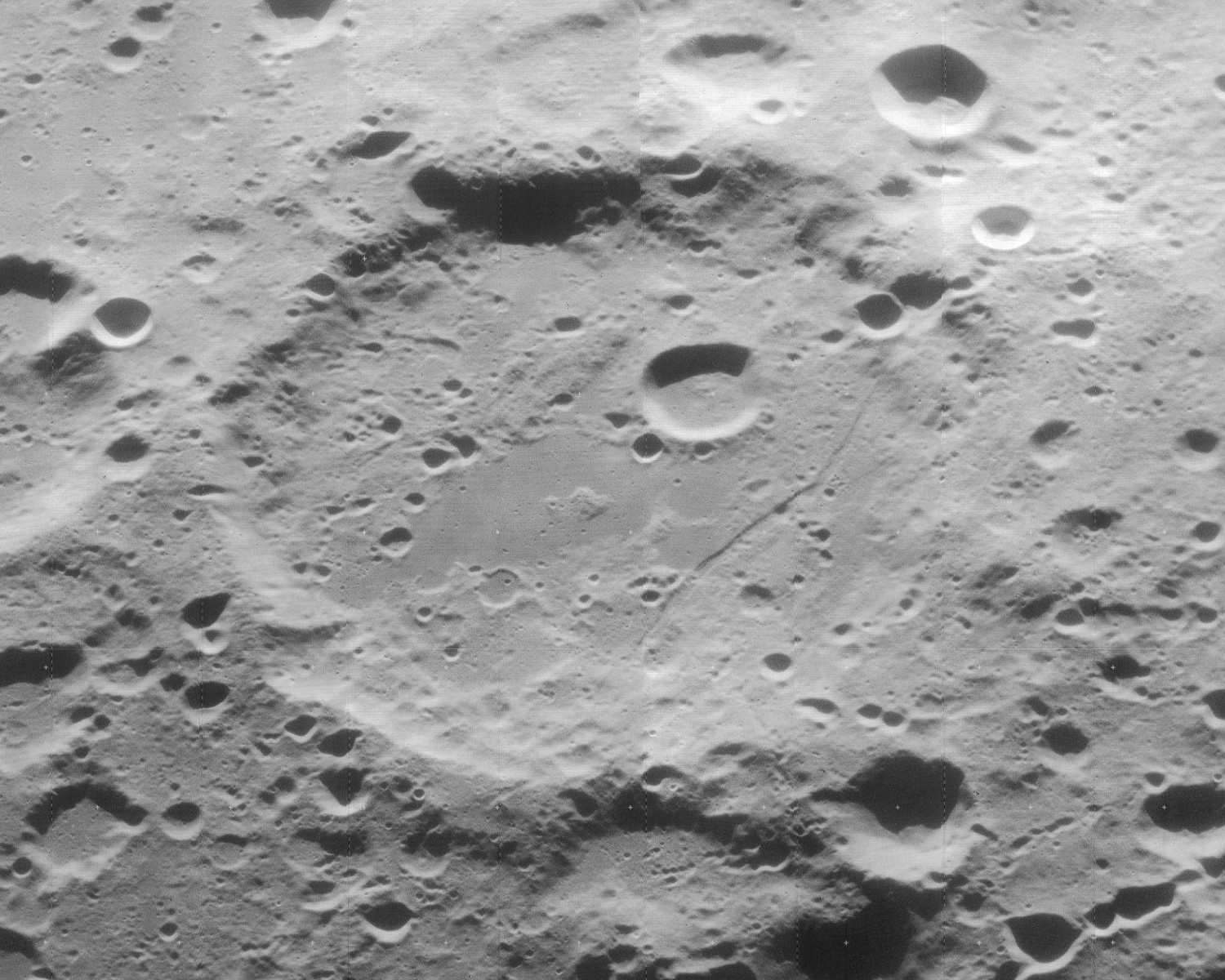
- Oblique Lunar Orbiter 4 image, facing west
- Coordinates: 36.3°S 60.4°E
- Diameter: 135.03 km (83.90 mi)
- Depth: 3.5 km (2.2 mi)
- Colongitude: 300° at sunrise
- Formation: Pre-Nectarian
- Eponym: Georges Fournier

Furnerius is a large lunar impact crater located in the southeast part of the Moon, in the area close to the southeastern limb of the nearside or visible Moon. Because of its location, the crater appears oval in shape due to foreshortening but is actually nearly circular. Notable nearby craters include Stevinus to the northwest and Fraunhofer to the south-southwest. Farther to the northwest is the crater Snellius and the Vallis Snellius crater valley.

This formation dates to the Pre-Nectarian period of the lunar geologic timescale. The rim of Furnerius is worn and battered, with multiple impacts along its length and notches along the base. Much of the wall now rises only slightly above the surrounding terrain, with the lowest sections to the north and south. However the northern wall rises to a maximum elevation of 3.5 km.

The interior floor is marked by fourteen notable craters, the most prominent being Furnerius B in the northern half which has a central rise. Dark patches on the floor indicate areas resurfaced by lava basalt. In the northeast part of the floor is a rille designated Rima Furnerius. This cleft is about 66 kilometers in length and follows a course to the northwest where it reaches the north rim of the crater.

In Johann H. Schröter's lunar study of 1791, he sketched this crater with a low dome in the southern half. This feature has proven difficult to identify in subsequent lunar photographs and observations.

The Japanese satellite named Hiten crash-landed in the highlands between Stevinus and Furnerius craters in 1993.

This formation is named after French mathematician Georges Fournier(1595-1652). In 1651, his name was included in the lunar nomenclature of Italian astronomer Giovanni B. Riccioli as "Furnarius Soc. I". Its modern designation was officially adopted by the International Astronomical Union in 1935.

== Headlights ==
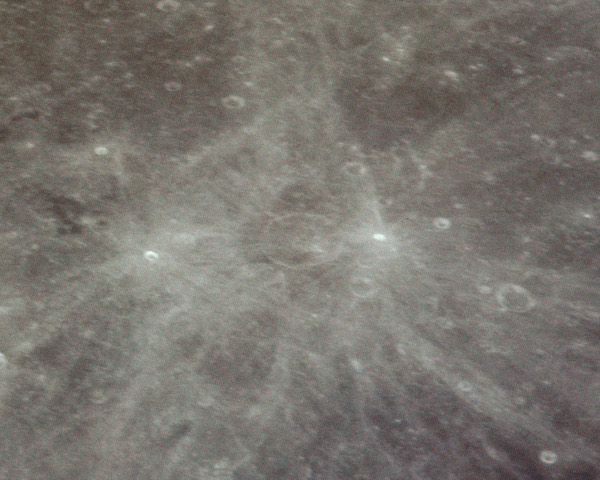
Oblique regional view with Stevinus at center, and two small bright craters with prominent ray systems: Stevinus A at right and Furnerius A at left. From Apollo 13.

Charles A. Wood and Maurice J. S. Collins call the two bright raycraters Furnerius A and Stevinus A, in their 21st Century Atlas of the Moon, the Headlights. Both bright raycraters are already observable through small binoculars, from waxing crescent moon to full moon. Their brightness is also noticeable on the photographic versions of charts LAC 98 (page 196), LAC 114 (page 228), and LAC 115 (page 230) in The Clementine Atlas of the Moon (Ben Bussey / Paul D. Spudis). British astronomer T. W. Webb notes, "the deep little crater Furnerius A ... is, in Full, a brilliant point on a white streak."

== Satellite craters ==
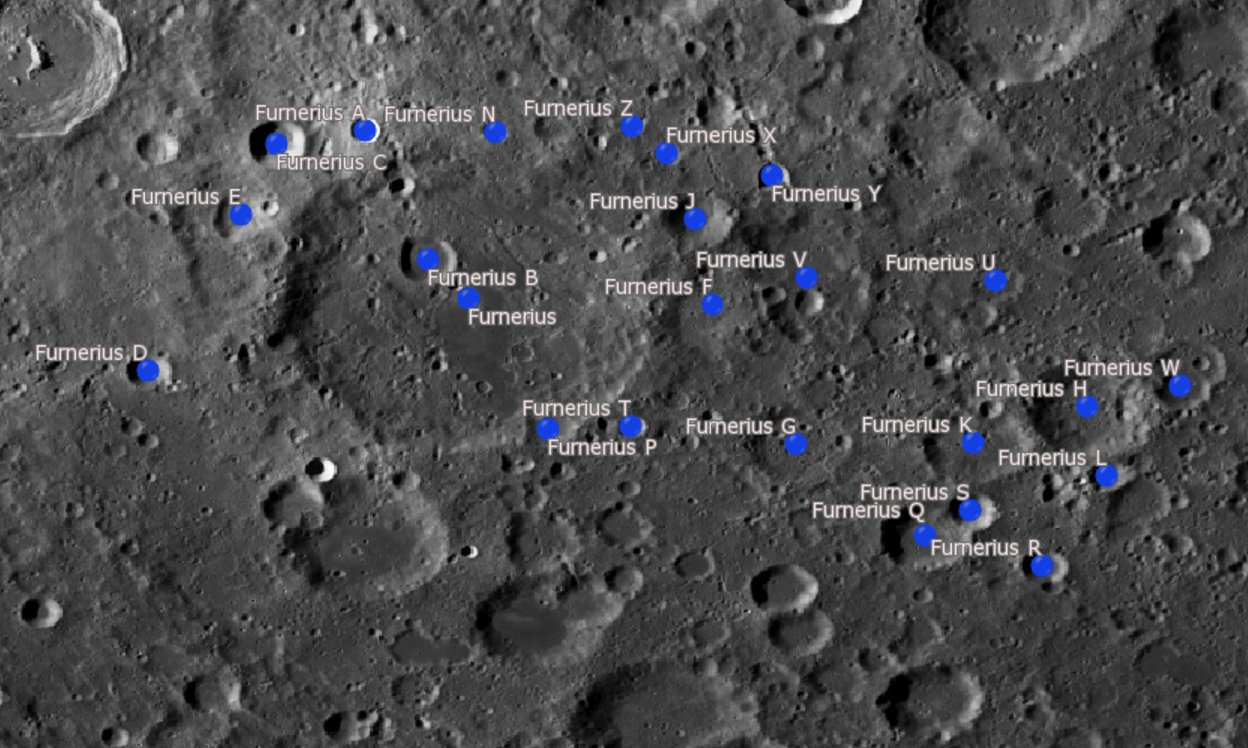
Satellite features and surroundings

By convention these features are identified on lunar maps by placing the letter on the side of the crater midpoint that is closest to Furnerius.

Furnerius	Latitude	Longitude	Diameter
A	33.5° S	59.0° E	12 km
B	35.5° S	59.9° E	22 km
C	33.7° S	57.8° E	22 km
D	37.0° S	55.9° E	16 km
E	34.8° S	57.1° E	22 km
F	36.2° S	64.0° E	43 km
G	38.2° S	65.4° E	34 km
H	37.6° S	69.5° E	44 km
J	34.8° S	64.2° E	24 km
K	38.1° S	68.1° E	36 km
L	38.6° S	69.9° E	13 km
N	33.6° S	61.1° E	9 km
P	38.0° S	61.8° E	18 km
Q	39.5° S	67.3° E	30 km
R	39.9° S	69.1° E	17 km
S	39.1° S	68.0° E	15 km
T	37.8° S	63.1° E	10 km
U	35.7° S	68.2° E	20 km
V	35.7° S	65.6° E	58 km
W	37.1° S	71.1° E	32 km
X	33.9° S	63.6° E	8 km
Y	34.3° S	65.2° E	12 km
Z	33.5° S	63.0° E	8 km
