= List of early warships of France =

This is a list of French battleships of the period 1410–1639:

- Nef de Morlaix/Marie de la Cordelière (Queen's ship) - Sunk in battle, 1512
- Nef de Brest (Queen's ship)
- Nef de Rochelle (Queen's ship)
- Nef de Bordeaux (Queen's ship)
- Saint Sauveur (Queen's ship)
- Nef de Rouen (c. 1510) (King's ship)
- Nef d'Orléans (c. 1510) (King's ship)
- Nef de Dieppe (c. 1510) (King's ship)
- Nef de Bordeaux (c. 1510) (King's ship)
- Petite Louise (c. 1510) (King's ship)
- Louise
- ? 16 - Captured by England 1512
- Grand Nef de la Bouvardière
- Grand Nef de St Malo
- Nef de Guemadeuc
- Nef de Tréguier
- L'Espaigneul
- Grand Nef of G. Finamour
- Nef Jean Frolai
- Nef de Vannes
- Michelle
- Sénéchal
- Chapon
- Grand Nef d'Ecosse (ex-Scottish Michael, purchased 1514)
- Marie de Clermont
- Havre du Grace (c. 1517)
- Sibille
- ^{Peter of La Rochelle}
- Grand François
- La Roberge
- Santa Ana (c. 1581)
- Theirry Henry
- Couronne (c. 1636)

== Bibliography ==
- Winfield, Rif & Roberts, Stephen S. (2017). French Warships in the Age of Sail 1626-1786: Design, Construction, Careers and Fates. Barnsley, UK: Seaforth Publishing. ISBN 978-1-4738-9351-1.
