= Georges Fournier (Jesuit) =

French Jesuit priest, geographer and mathematician

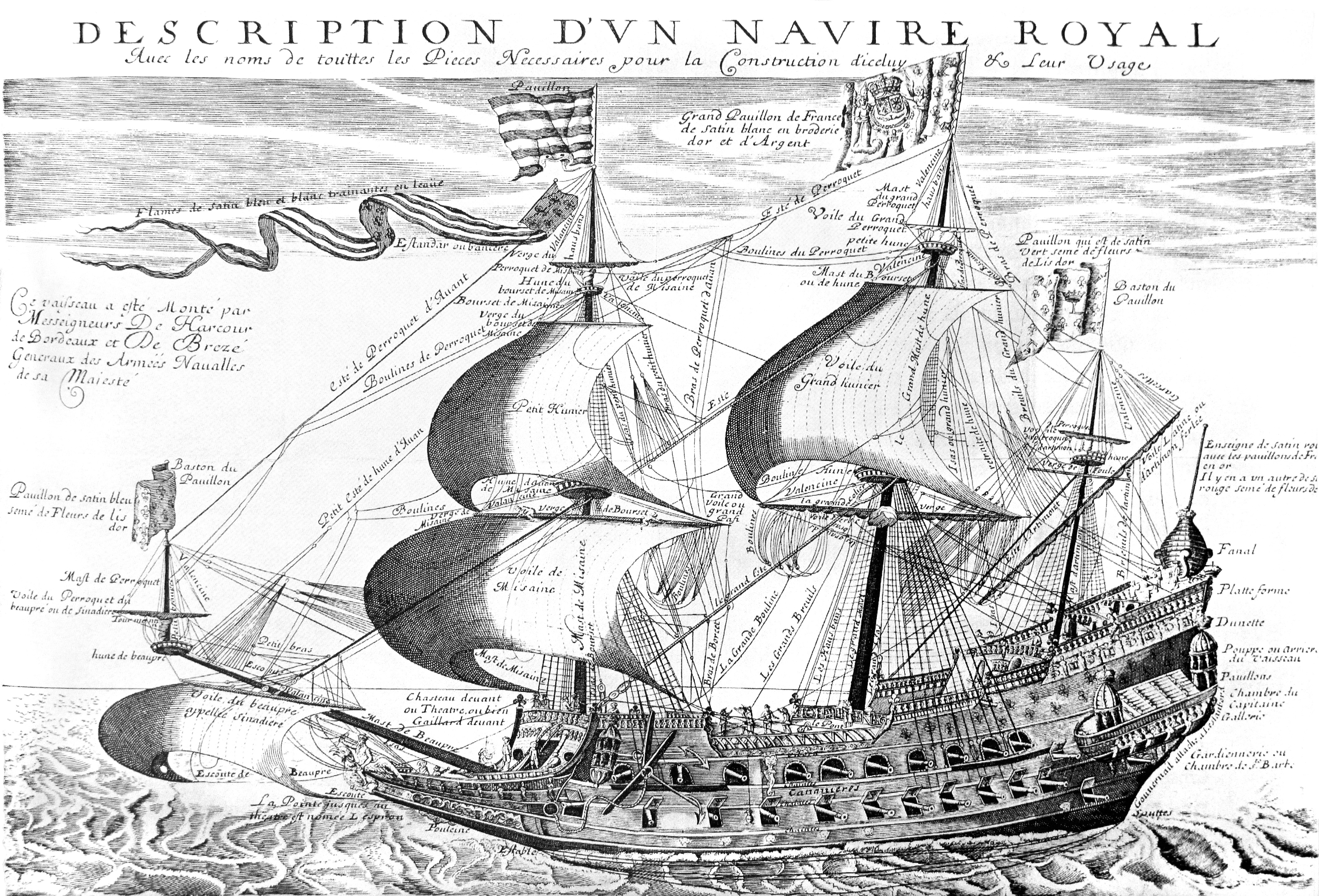
The Couronne. Frontispiece of Hydrographie by Georges Fournier, 1643.

Georges Fournier (31 August 1595 – 13 April 1652) was a French Jesuit priest, geographer and mathematician.

== Biography ==
Fournier served as a naval military chaplain on a ship of the line, and acquired a strong knowledge of technical and naval matters.

In 1642, he published the treaty Hydrographie, where he attempted to provide a scientific foundation to the design of ships. At the time, results like Couronne or Sovereign of the Seas were obtained by empirical trials and errors.

He also authored a Treaty of fortifications or military architecture, drawn from the most estimated places of our times, for fortifications, whose original edition was published in Paris in 1649 by Jean Hénault at the Salle Dauphine of l'ange gardien. Another edition was published in 1668 in Mayence by Louis Bourgeat.

Georges Fournier taught René Descartes.

== Works ==
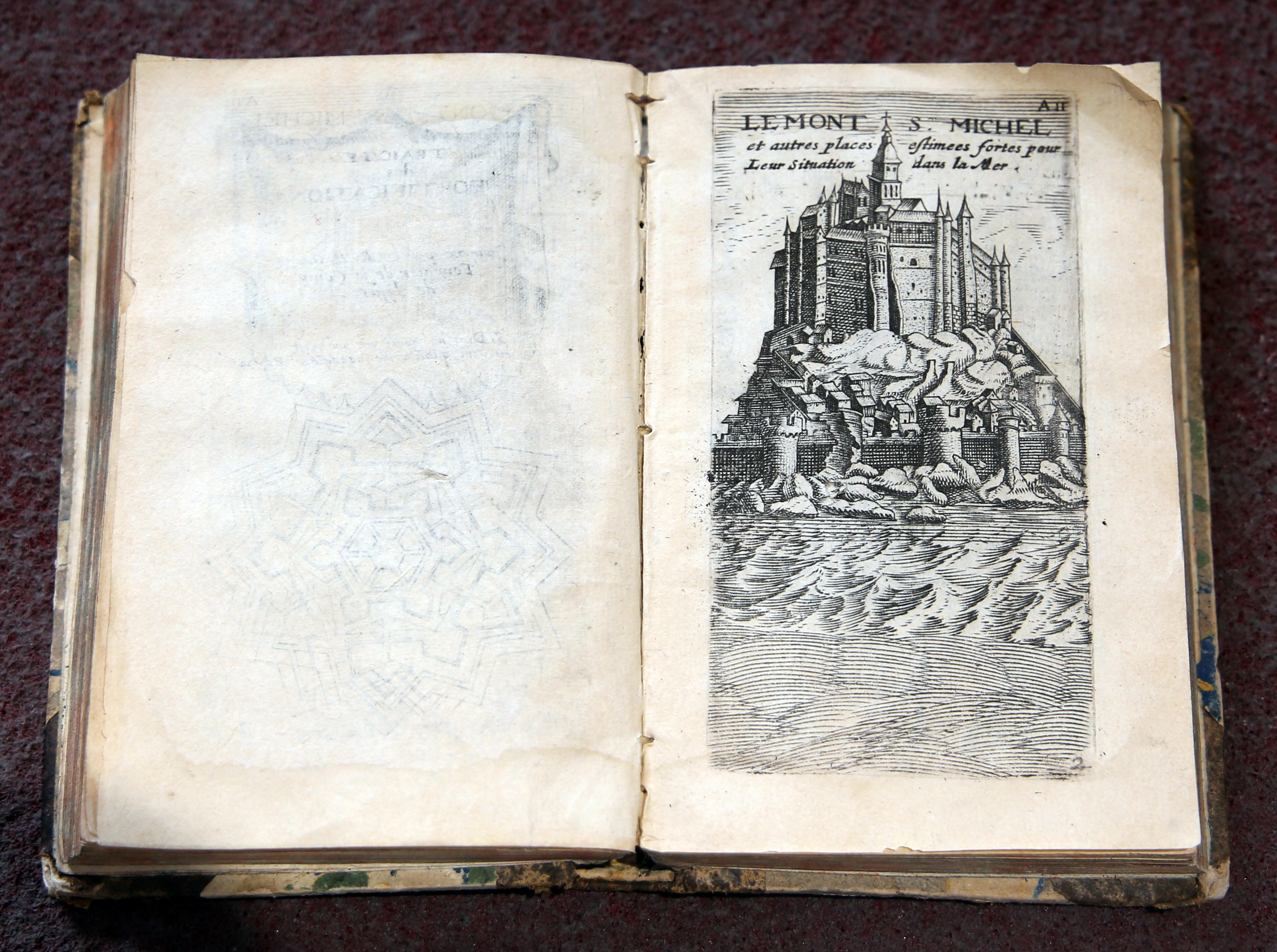
Des fortifications..., 1654

In 1642, Fournier published his Commentaires géographiques. The following year he published in Paris the work which will give him the essential part of his celebrity: the Hydrographie contenant la théorie et la pratique de toutes les parties de la navigation. Resolutely scientific, it is the first French maritime encyclopedia. Dedicated to Louis XIII, it was reprinted many times (1667, 1679, 1973). Geographer, astronomer, hydrographer, mathematician, Fournier took an interest in everything: winds and tides, ports, fishing, maritime trade, shipbuilding, the conduct of officers and the art of command. The Hydrographie was therefore a first-rate source for the history of the navy during the first half of the seventeenth century, which explains the "magnificent re-edition" of this work in 1973 (Etienne Taillemite). Georges Fournier also published in 1643 a Traité de la sphere and in 1644 a Traité de géométrie. His Traité des fortifications ou Architecture militaire (published in Paris in 1649) was translated into Dutch, Spanish and German. His works on Euclidean geometry (Paris, 1644 and 1654) were translated into English, and gave rise to three successive editions. In 1656, posthumously appeared his Asiae nova descriptio (New Description of Asia). The book was made in collaboration with several jesuit missionaries.

== See also ==
- Furnerius (crater)

== Bibliography ==
- Fournier, Georges (1643). Hydrographie, contenant la théorie et la practique de toutes les parties de la navigation... Paris: Soly. BNF 304555507
- Gille, Bertrand (1978). Histoire des techniques. Paris: Gallimard. ISBN 978-2-07-010881-7.
- Taillemite, Étienne (2002). Dictionnaire des Marins français. Tallandier. ISBN 2-84734-008-4.
- Vergé-Franceschi, Michel (2002). Dictionnaire d'Histoire maritime. Paris: Robert Laffont. ISBN 2-221-08751-8.
