= Porter (lunar crater) =

Crater on the Moon

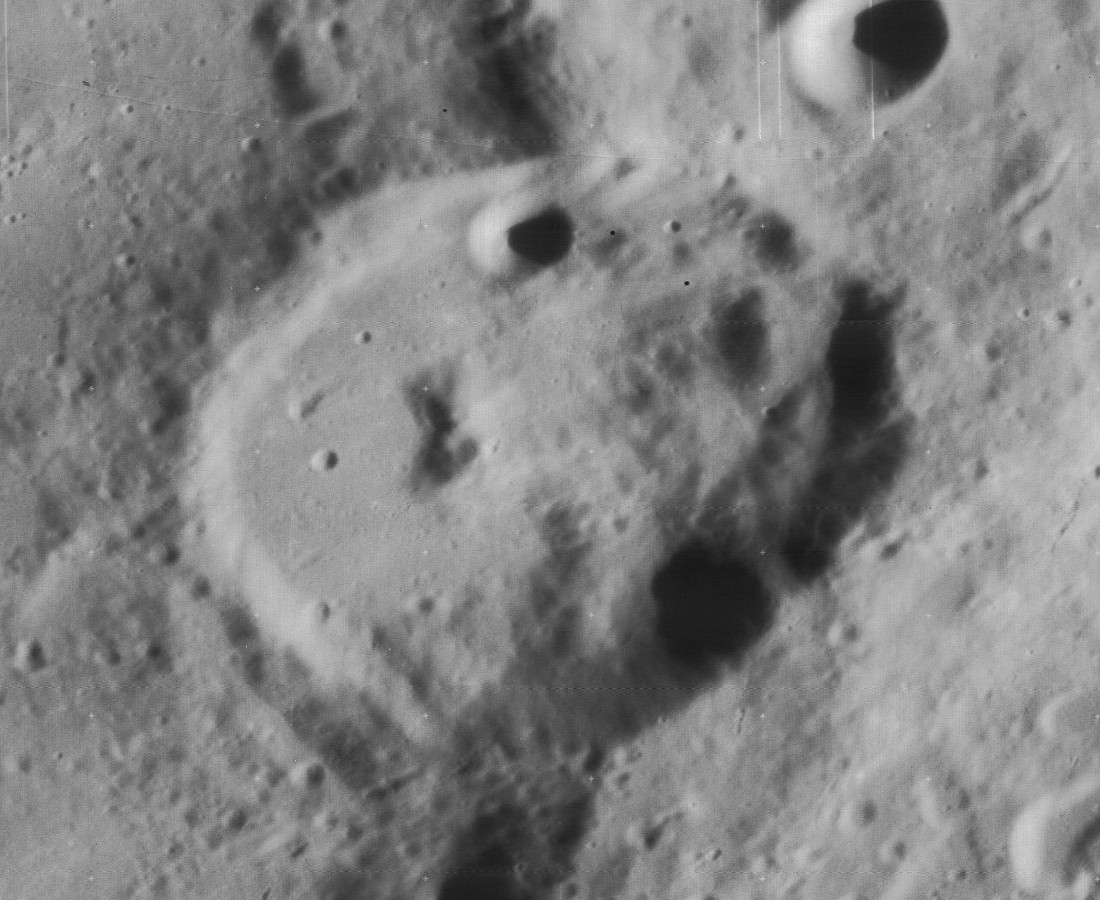
- Slightly oblique Lunar Orbiter 4 image
- Coordinates: 56.1°S 10.1°W
- Diameter: 52 km
- Depth: 2.3 km
- Colongitude: 12° at sunrise
- Formation: Nectarian
- Eponym: Russell W. Porter

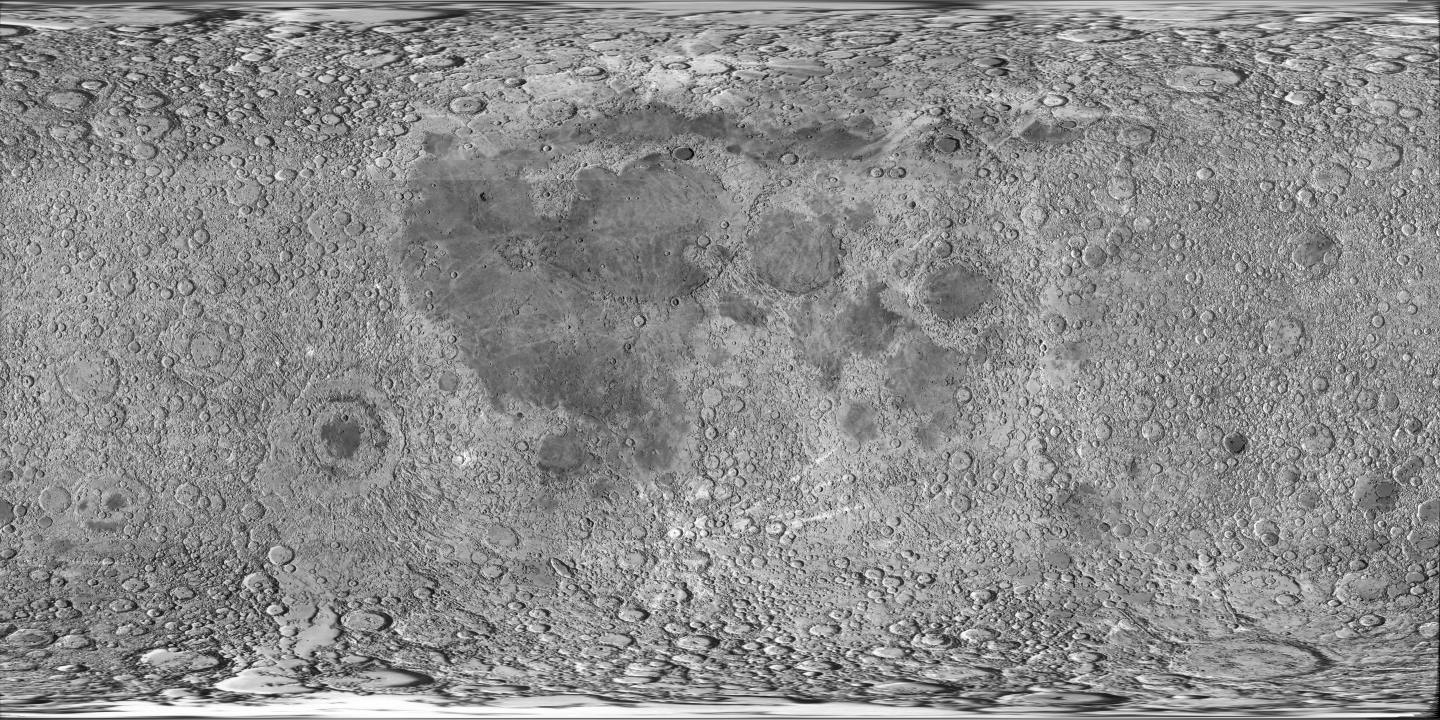
Location of Porter on the Moon

Porter is a lunar impact crater that is located in the southern part of the Moon, and lies across the northeastern rim of the huge walled plain Clavius. Although generally circular, the form of this crater has been modified by the geometry of the surface on which it was formed. The outer rim is generally lower to the southwest, where it lies on the floor of Clavius. Likewise the interior floor is flatter near this face. In contrast the northeastern floor is rougher and more uneven in the northeastern half.

On the lunar geologic time scale, this formation may date to the Nectarian period. The crater is somewhat worn in appearance, in comparison with the younger and sharper-edged Rutherfurd to the south along the southeastern rim of Clavius. There is a double central peak located just to the southwest of the midpoint. A small craterlet lies along the northwestern inner wall of the crater, but the formation is not otherwise significantly marked by smaller impacts.

This crater was formerly designated Clavius B before being renamed by the IAU.

== Satellite craters ==
By convention these features are identified on lunar maps by placing the letter on the side of the crater midpoint that is closest to Porter.

Porter	Latitude	Longitude	Diameter
B	54.4° S	8.6° W	12 km
C	54.8° S	10.3° W	12 km
