= Clavius (crater) =

Lunar surface depression

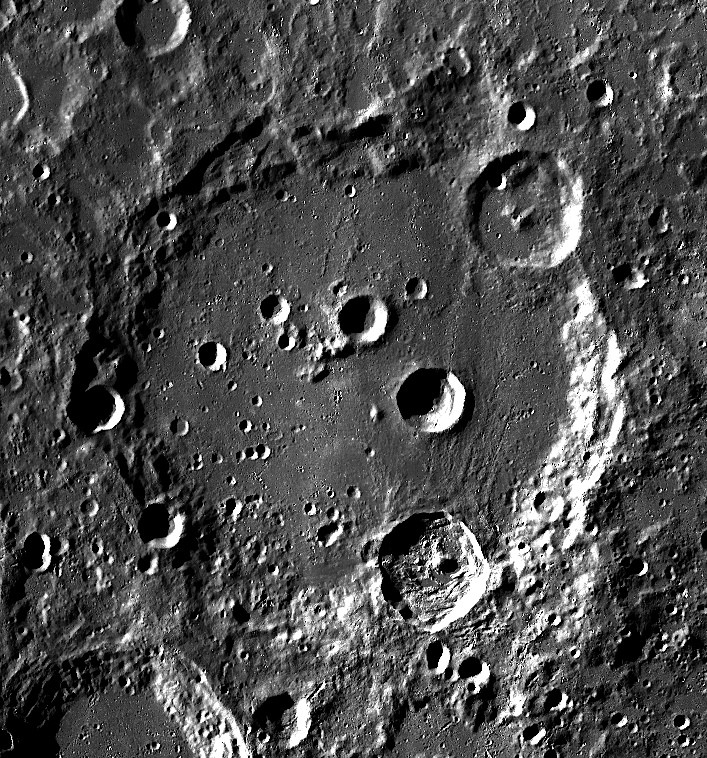
- LROC image NASA photo. (South up)
- Coordinates: 58.4°S 14.4°W
- Diameter: 230.77 km (143.39 mi)
- Depth: 4.76 km (2.96 mi)
- Colongitude: 15° at sunrise
- Formation: Nectarian
- Eponym: Christoph Klau

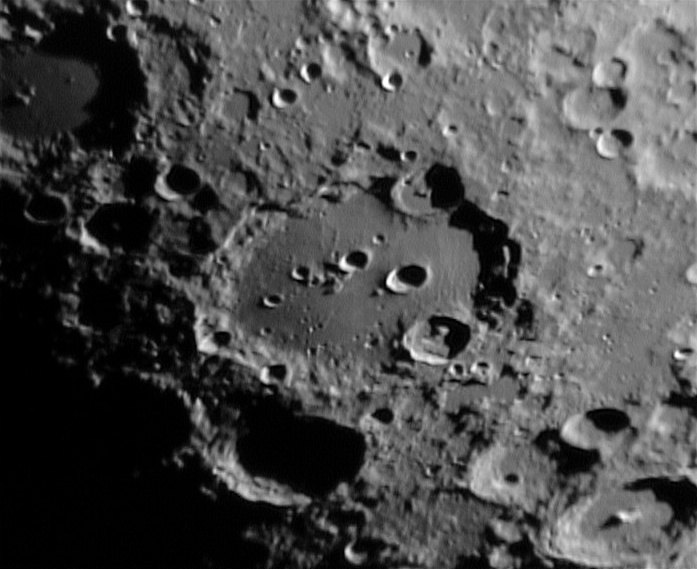
Earth-based view of Clavius (North up)

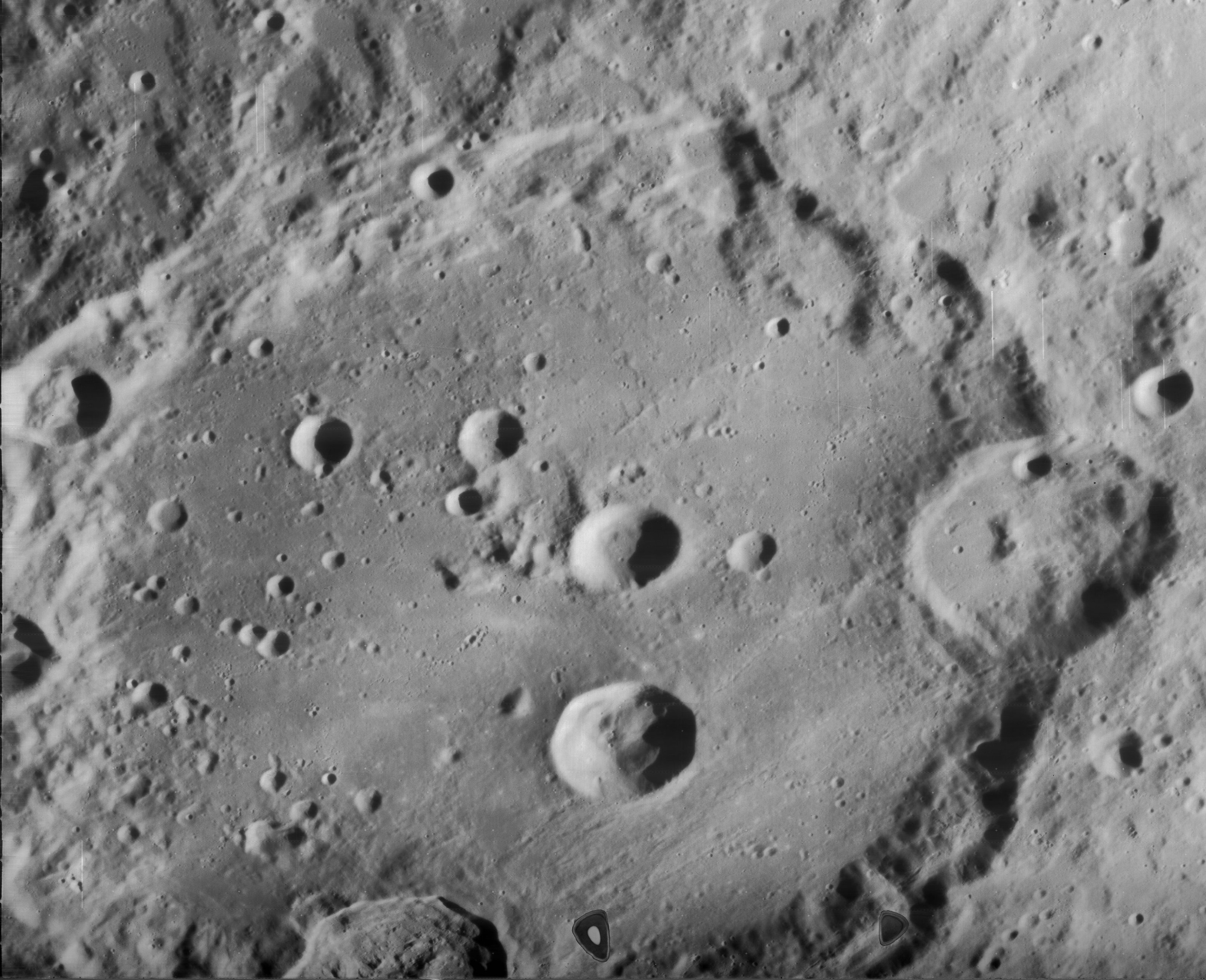
Lunar Orbiter 4 view of Clavius

Clavius is one of the largest crater formations on the Moon and the largest crater on the visible near side. T. W. Webb described it as "one of the grandest cavities in the Moon, though ill-placed for observation." It is "tolerably circular" and "encompassed by a wall damaged by successive explosions". When on the terminator, Clavius can be discerned with the naked eye. This crater is a key topographic attraction of the rugged southern highlands of the Moon, positioned to the south of the prominent ray crater Tycho. A ray from Tycho crosses the Clavius basin from north to south.

This formation is named for the German mathematician Christopher Clavius (1537-1612). His name was included as "Clavius Soc. I." in the lunar nomenclature of the Italian astronomer Giovanni B. Riccioli in 1651. The "Soc. I." was later dropped. This designation was officially adopted by the International Astronomical Union in 1935.

== Description ==
Clavius' location toward the southern limb of the Moon causes it to appear oblong due to foreshortening. Its great size makes it visible to the unaided eye as a prominent notch in the terminator about one to two days after the Moon reaches first quarter. This formation dates to the Nectarian period of the lunar geologic timescale. Its creation would have excavated the lunar crust to a depth of 20–25 km, shifting a material volume of 6.8×10^{4} km^{3}.

Clavius has a low outer wall in comparison to its size and is heavily worn and pock-marked by craterlets. The rim does not significantly overlook the surrounding terrain making it a "walled depression". The inner surface of the rim is hilly, notched and varies in width with the steepest portion to the south. The rim has been observed to have a somewhat polygonal outline overall. The northeast rim is broken by Porter crater.

The floor of Clavius forms a convex plain that is marked by some interesting crater impacts. The most notable of these is a curving chain of craters that begins with Rutherfurd in the south then arcs across the floor in a counterclockwise direction forming a sequence of ever diminishing diameters. From largest to smallest, these craters are designated Clavius D, C, N, J, and JA. This sequence of diminishing craters has proved a useful tool for amateur astronomers who want to test the resolution of their small telescopes.

This formation is sufficiently large that is could have developed a peak ring formation, but no such feature has survived, if it existed. The crater floor retains a remnant of a central massif, which lies between Clavius C and N. The spectra of the central peak fits an anorthositic gabbro mineralogy, which originated from a depth of 24.5 to 42.4 km. The relative smoothness of the floor and the low size of the central peaks may indicate that the crater surface was formed some time after the original impact.

== Presence of water ==
In October 2020, NASA confirmed the existence of molecular water near Clavius, at concentrations of up to 412 parts per million. The water could be trapped into tiny beadlike structures in the soil that form out of the high heat created by micrometeorite impacts. The water might also be sheltered between lunar soil grains. Another possibility is from very small asteroid strikes, such as a rubble pile from a much more massive "parent" asteroid collision. Pulled apart in its descent to the lunar surface similar to Comet Shoemaker–Levy 9, and hitting the surface in a modest dispersal area with a small mass at low, oblique impact angle and bouncing could allow some water to remain in the lithic matrix. The carbonaceous chondrite class is often water-rich, and the CI sub group are as much as 22% water. The ejecta deposits of Rutherfurd crater overlap regions of enhanced water abundance on the floor of Clavius, suggesting that impact-related ejecta transport and deposition may have contributed to the observed distribution of water.

== Satellite craters Clavius E and Clavius G during full moon ==
North of Clavius and south of Tycho, the couple of bright satellite craters Clavius E and Clavius G are eye catchers during full moon. Their appearance as a couple is also noticeable on the photographic version of chart LAC 126 (page 252) in The Clementine Atlas of the Moon (Ben Bussey / Paul D. Spudis).

== Satellite craters ==
By convention these features are identified on lunar maps by placing the letter on the side of the crater midpoint that is closest to Clavius.

Clavius	Latitude	Longitude	Diameter
C	57.7° S	14.2° W	21 km
D	58.8° S	12.4° W	28 km
E	51.5° S	12.6° W	16 km
F	55.4° S	21.9° W	7 km
G	52.0° S	13.9° W	17 km
H	51.9° S	15.8° W	34 km
J	58.1° S	18.1° W	12 km
K	60.4° S	19.8° W	20 km
L	58.7° S	21.2° W	24 km
M	54.8° S	11.9° W	44 km
N	57.5° S	16.5° W	13 km
O	56.8° S	16.4° W	4 km
P	57.0° S	7.7° W	10 km
R	53.1° S	15.4° W	7 km
T	60.4° S	14.9° W	9 km
W	55.8° S	16.0° W	6 km
X	60.0° S	17.6° W	7 km
Y	57.8° S	16.0° W	7 km

== In popular culture ==
- Clavius Base, the site of an American lunar administrative facility in the movie 2001: A Space Odyssey
- Time-travel facility located under Clavius in the 2015 Madeira Desouza novel entitled Baja Clavius: Moon Men Deep Inside
- The location of the fictional Tranquility Base Hotel & Casino in the Arctic Monkeys song "Four Out of Five"
