= Stevinus (crater) =

Crater on the Moon

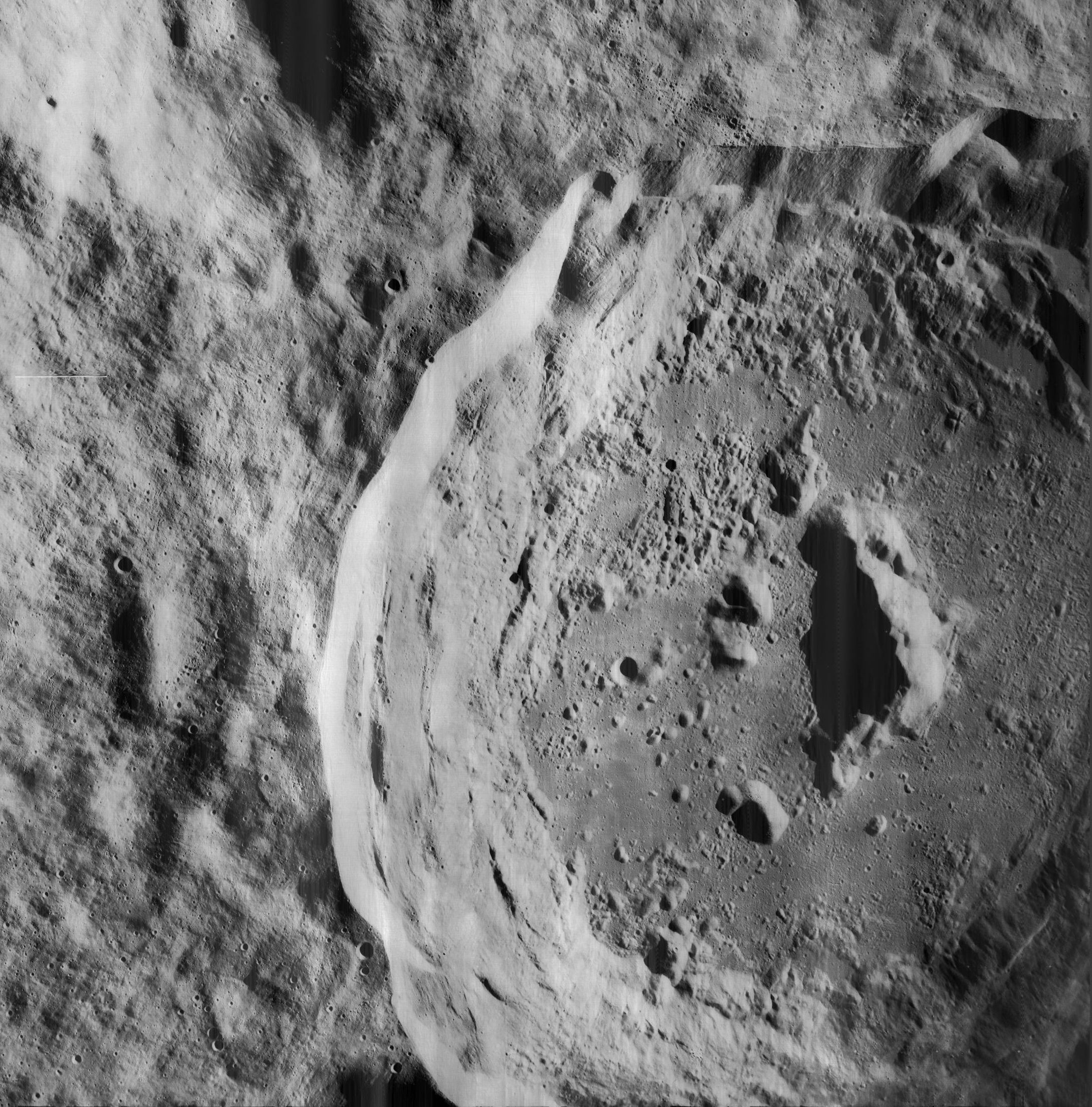
- Lunar Orbiter 5 image
- Coordinates: 32.5°S 54.2°E
- Diameter: 75 km
- Depth: 3.0 km
- Colongitude: 306° at sunrise
- Formation: Copernican
- Eponym: Simon Stevin

Stevinus is a lunar impact crater located in the southeast part of the Moon. To the southeast is the large crater Furnerius. Just to the northeast is Snellius and the Vallis Snellius crater valley. To the west-northwest lies Reichenbach. To the west-northwest of Stevinus is the tiny crater Stevinus A, a feature that possesses a small ray system and a displays a high albedo.

Stevinus has a high inner wall and a central peak at the midpoint of the interior floor. The inner walls are slumped, so that the side slopes down sharply, then more gradually. There are several small ridges on the floor, in addition to the peak. The spectra of this peak fits an olivine-bearing gabbroic norite mineralogy, which originated from a depth of 7.4 to 11.6 km. Due to its ray system, Stevinus is mapped as part of the Copernican System on the lunar geologic timescale.

It is named for Simon Stevin, a 16th-century Belgian mathematician and engineer.

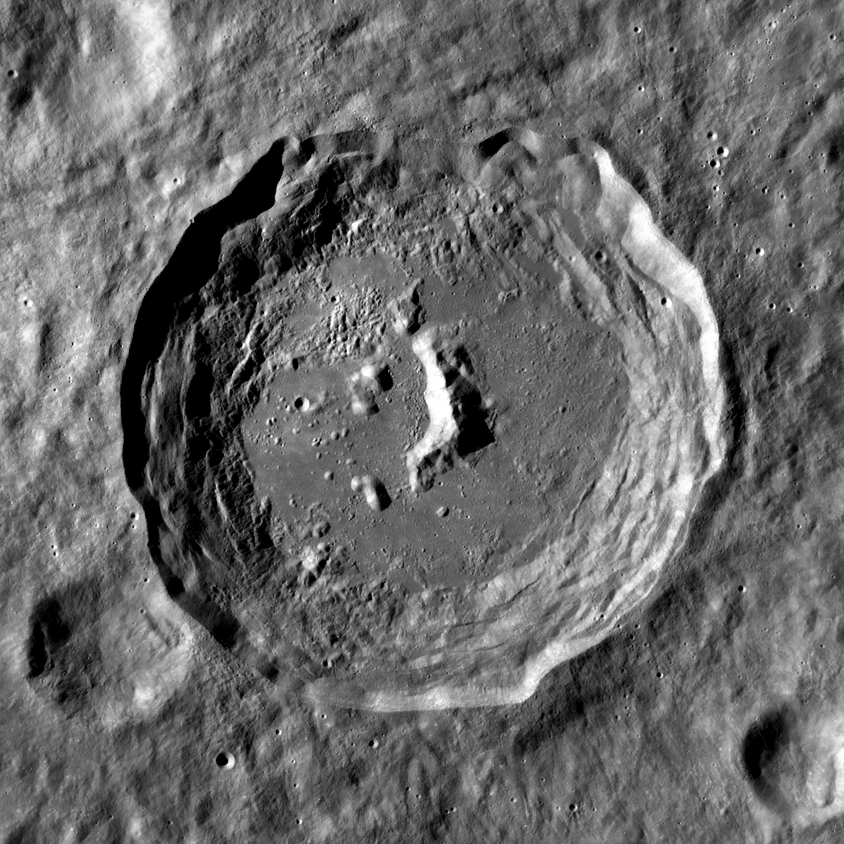
LRO image

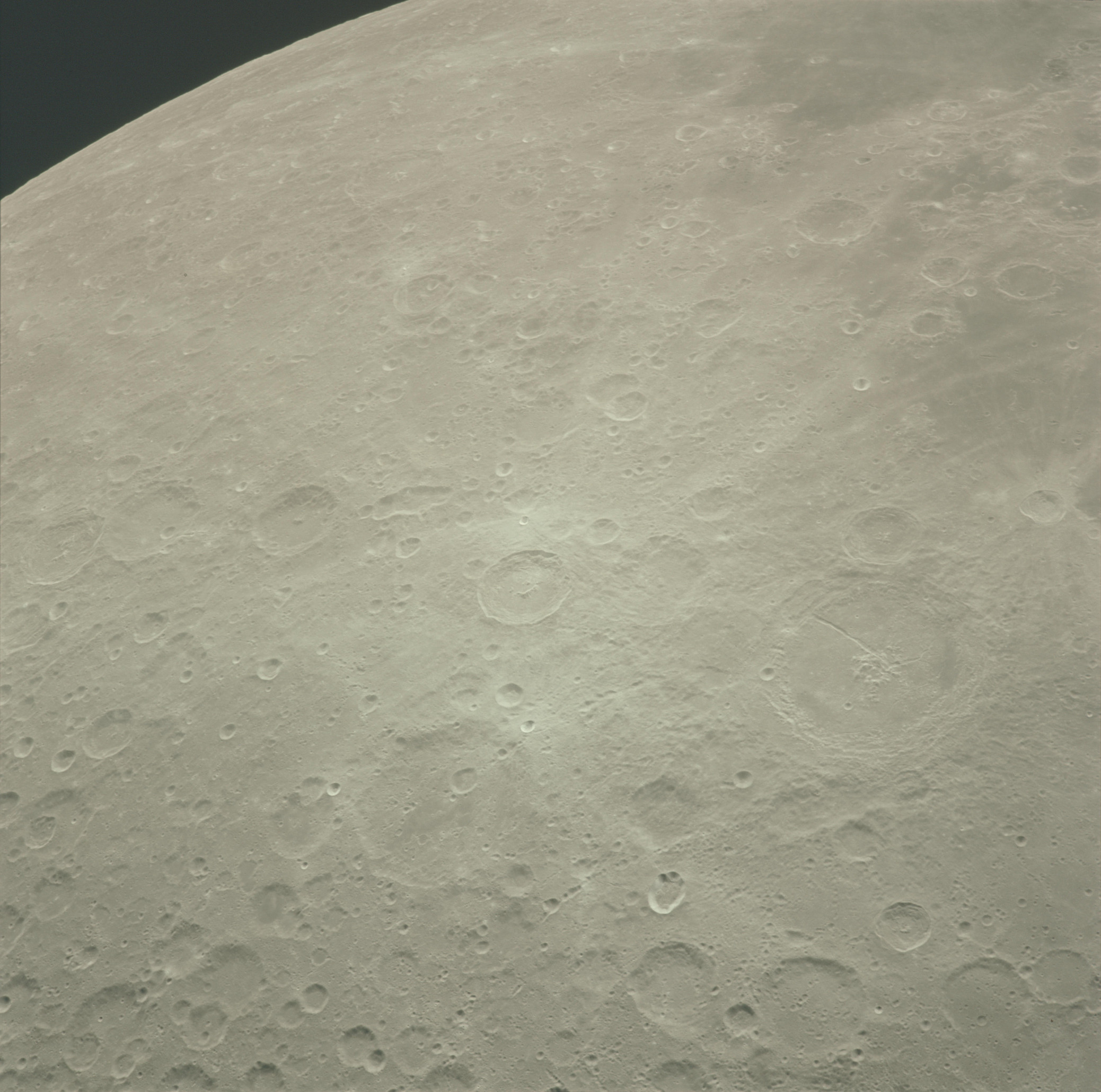
Oblique regional view with Stevinus at center, from Apollo 15

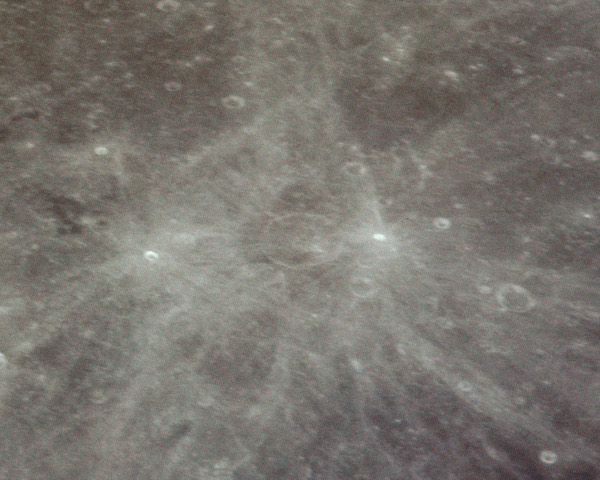
Oblique regional view with Stevinus at center, and two small bright craters with prominent ray systems: Stevinus A at right and Furnerius A at left. From Apollo 13.

== Headlights ==
Charles A. Wood and Maurice J. S. Collins call the two bright raycraters Stevinus A and Furnerius A, in their 21st Century Atlas of the Moon, the Headlights. Both bright raycraters are already observable through small binoculars, from waxing crescent moon to full moon. Their brightness is also noticeable on the photographic versions of charts LAC 98 (page 196), LAC 114 (page 228), and LAC 115 (page 230) in The Clementine Atlas of the Moon (Ben Bussey / Paul D. Spudis).

== Satellite craters ==
By convention these features are identified on lunar maps by placing the letter on the side of the crater midpoint that is closest to Stevinus.

Stevinus	Latitude	Longitude	Diameter
A	31.8° S	51.6° E	8 km
B	31.1° S	52.6° E	20 km
C	33.4° S	52.8° E	19 km
D	34.8° S	50.9° E	22 km
E	35.3° S	52.5° E	16 km
F	30.6° S	52.7° E	10 km
G	33.7° S	50.4° E	13 km
H	33.2° S	50.6° E	15 km
J	36.1° S	52.4° E	13 km
K	34.3° S	55.4° E	8 km
L	33.8° S	56.1° E	14 km
R	31.6° S	50.9° E	26 km
S	30.7° S	51.2° E	7 km
