= Rutherfurd (crater) =

Crater on the Moon

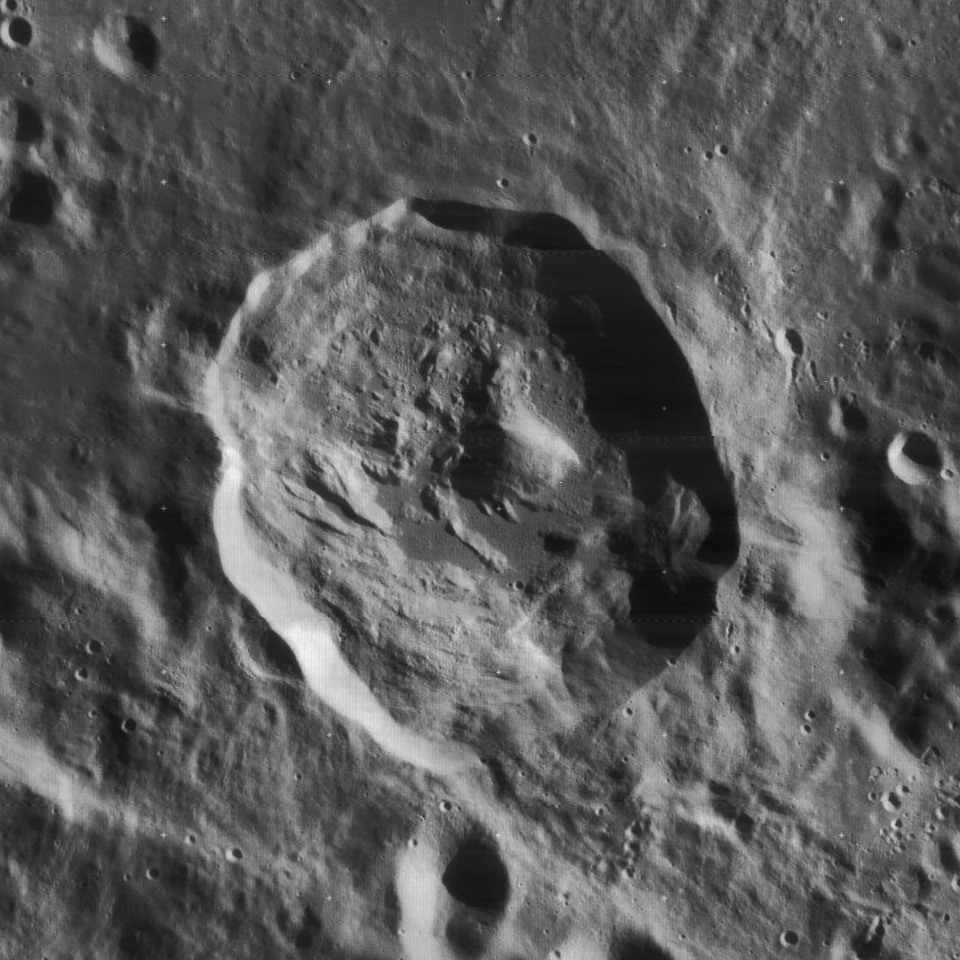
- Lunar Orbiter 4 image
- Coordinates: 60.9°S 12.1°W
- Diameter: 48 × 54 km
- Depth: 2.9 km
- Colongitude: 13° at sunrise
- Eponym: Lewis M. Rutherfurd

Rutherfurd is a well-preserved impact crater located on the Moon, entirely within the southern rim of the much larger crater Clavius. The crater Porter is located to the north-northeast of Rutherfurd, on the northeastern rim of Clavius. Rutherfurd forms the larger member in an arcing chain of craters of decreasing size that curves across the floor of Clavius. The craters in this chain do not appear to be the same age, so this formation is most likely random in nature.

The crater was named by and for astrophotographer Lewis Morris Rutherfurd who took the first telescopic photographs of the Moon.

It has been suggested that the many pits and caves located on the crater can be used to serve as potential sites for human lunar habitats and robotic subsurface exploration.

== Description ==
It has a diameter of 48 by 54 kilometers and has a depth of 2.9 km. Rutherfurd is somewhat oval in shape, with the long axis oriented approximately in a north–south direction.

=== Rim ===
The northern outer ramparts have a series of radiating ridges on the floor of Clavius. The rim overlies the inner wall of Clavius, and thus the rim of Rutherfurd is higher above the surface along the north and west sides.

=== Floor ===
The floor of Rutherford crater has noticeable variations in topography. The floor is irregular in shape, and there is a central peak somewhat offset to the northeast. Due to the variations of the crater floor, it has been classified into three subunits: smooth (Cfs), hummocky (Cfh), and intermediate (Cfi). Going from most to least, the total area occupied are the hummocky unit (~44.14%), the intermediate unit (~22.39%) and the smooth unit (~33.47%).

==== Smooth unit ====
The smooth unit covers an area of approximately 98.14 square kilometers being found along the periphery of the crater floor and around the margin of the hummocky unit extending from the western to south-eastern parts of the crater, bordering both the central uplift and the intermediate regions. It is characterized by a relatively uniform flat smooth surface texture and low roughness. The floor has low albedo and has cooling tracks. The smooth area also only contains 16 isolated mounds making it have the lowest amount of mounds out of the three. The smallest identified has a length of around 200 meters while the largest has a length of 500 meters and mounds have a higher albedo compared to the rest of the surrounding melt.

==== Hummocky area ====
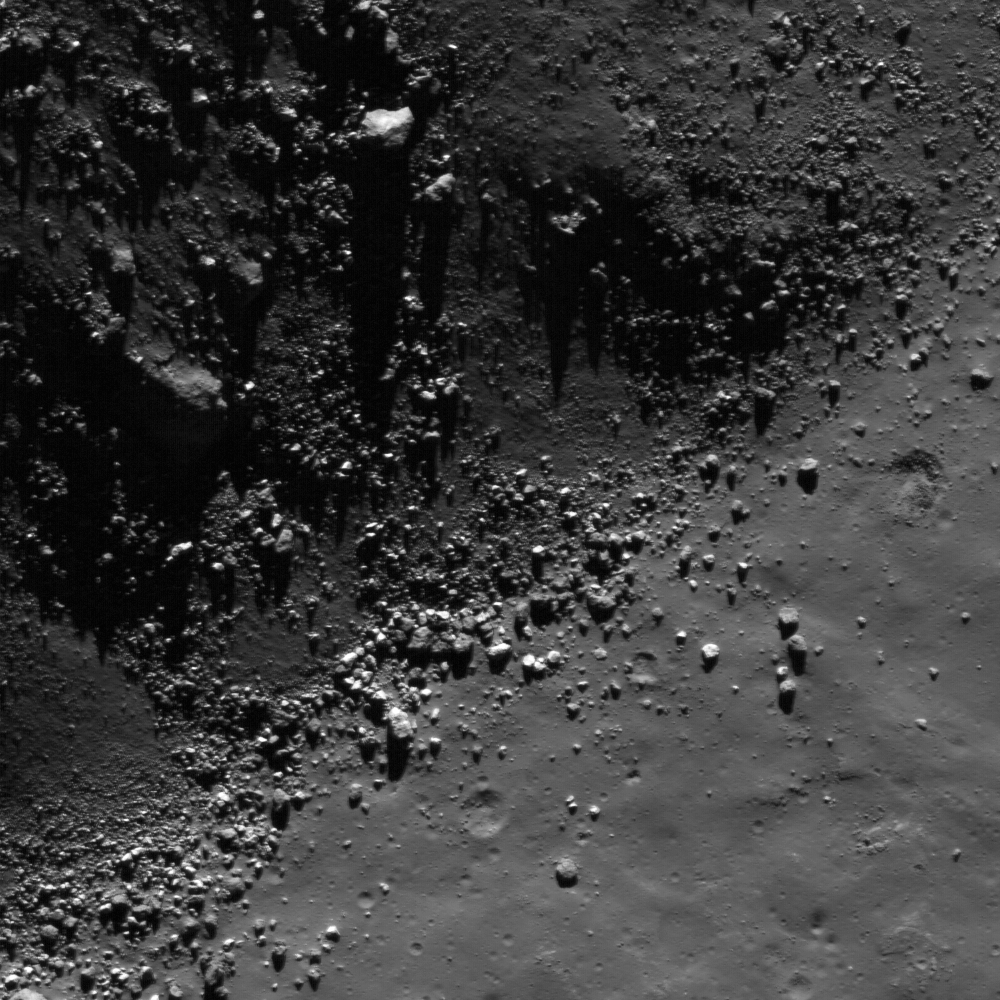
Boulders located on the central peak of Rutherfurd crater

The hummocky unit is located in the north-western part of the crater floor. This unit has uneven terrain with high topographic variability. It is characterized by less extensive smooth impact melt deposits and the lowest concentration of extensive impact melt. It has abundant isolated mounds with 107 having been identified making this region having the highest concentration of mounds. These mounds varied in size with the largest, situated west of the central uplift, being approximately 5.5 kilometers in length. The smaller mounds have lengths of around 200 meters though there may be numerous smaller mounds that were not detected due to resolvability issues. They have rough surface textures and boulders commonly scattered across their surfaces.

==== Intermediate area ====
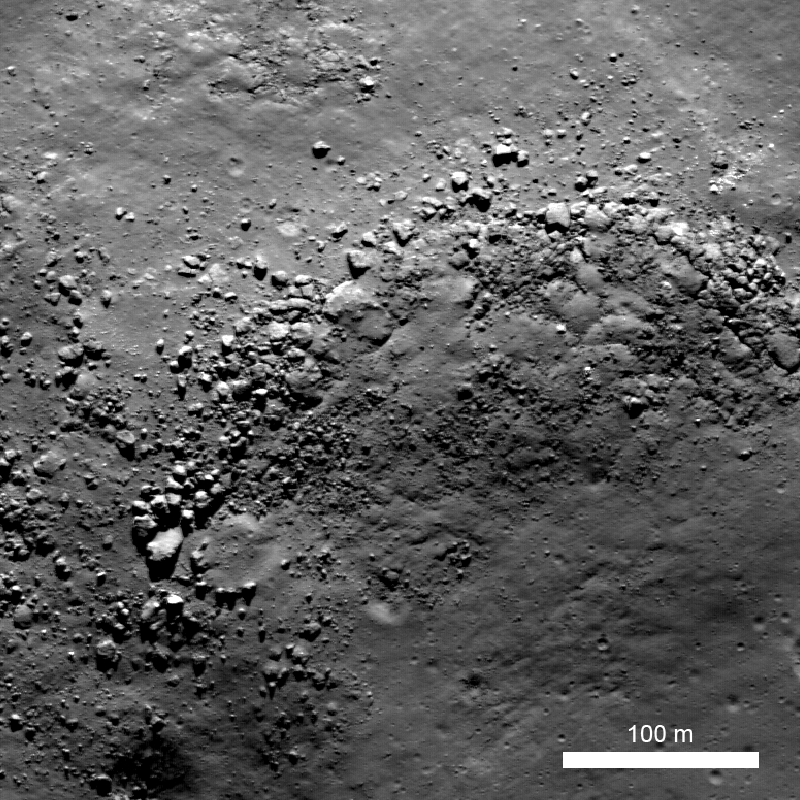
Boulders of various sized located on the central peak of Rutherfurd

The intermediate unit of the crater floor is characterized by a combination of isolated mounds and smooth impact melt deposits. This mixture of terrain creates a transitional morphology between the smooth and hummocky terrains. Areas that are dominated by impact melt appear relatively smooth, whereas regions with a higher concentration of mounds display increased roughness. It has 55 isolated mounds which are often surrounded by extensive impact melt. The smallest of these mounds have a length of 200 meters while the largest have a length of approximately 1.5 kilometers.

==== Central uplift ====
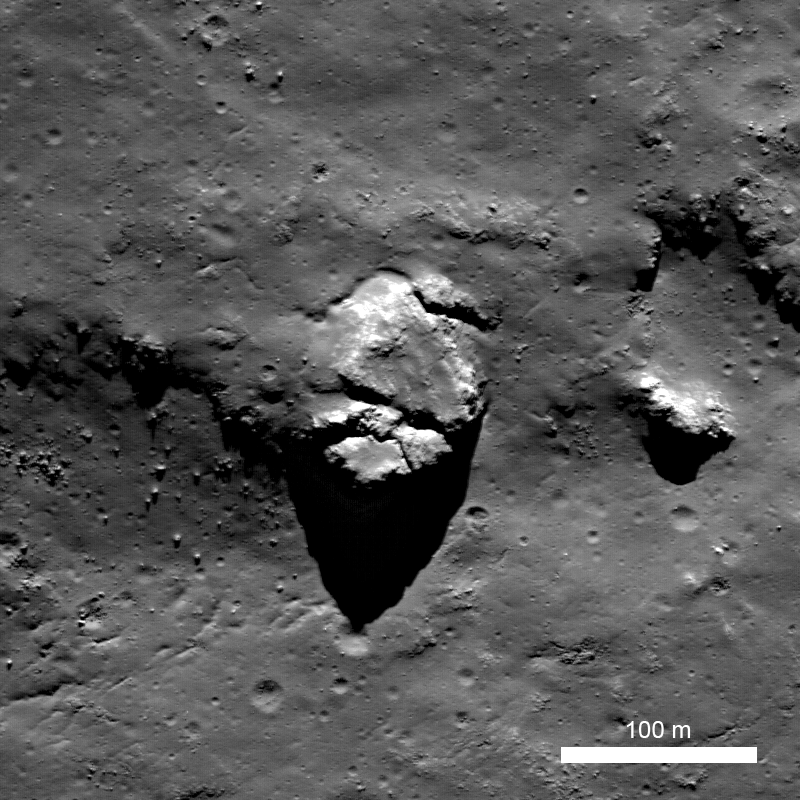
Central peak of Rutherfurd crater

The central uplift of the crater is not located at the center of the crater but is instead offset to the northeast surrounded by all three regions of the crater floor. It has a domical shape. It has a height of approximately 1.7 kilometers above the crater floor.

==== Isolated mounds ====
Isolated mounds can be found within the Rutherford crater. They vary in size with the smallest having a size of around 200 meters with the largest being around 5.5 kilometers in size. Most are surrounded by impact melt, with the exception of those from the hummocky unit. Most also contain boulders on their surfaces having sizes of a few tens of meters or smaller.

=== Ejecta ===
The ejecta pattern is asymmetric having an oblong shape and location of the central peak indicate the original impact may have been at a low angle from the southeast. Due to its rays, Rutherfurd is mapped as part of the Copernican System.

== Geology ==
The geology of the crater is complex. There have been numerous pits, cave-like structures, sloped and rugged terrains identified rather than flat melt surfaces. Some of these pits and linear fractures formed along cooling tracks while others formed form impact melt lava tubes. Surprisingly, many (30.9%) of these features are not found on the smooth, flat door but instead along the craters sloping margins, the flanks of uplifted blocks, or on the collapsed rim terraces.

=== History ===
Rutherfurd crater formed during the Moon's Copernican period. When the object that would form the crater hit the Moon, the ejecta it produced was asymmetric. There numerous lines of evidence showing that the dynamic impact melt displacement was enhanced with volatile elements such as water. This comes from the complex rugged terrain of slopes, pits and caves instead of a flatter surface. This is further confirmed with most of these pits and caves being located not on the craters floor but instead along and slopes and rim of the crater. More evidence for the involvement of water comes from the mapping of the ejecta blanket in the crater floor of Clavius. Mapping shows that regions of high water concentration align with ejecta blankets. This water seems to have been delivered through the impacts itself rather than being excavated from the Moon's water reservoirs.

== Satellite craters ==
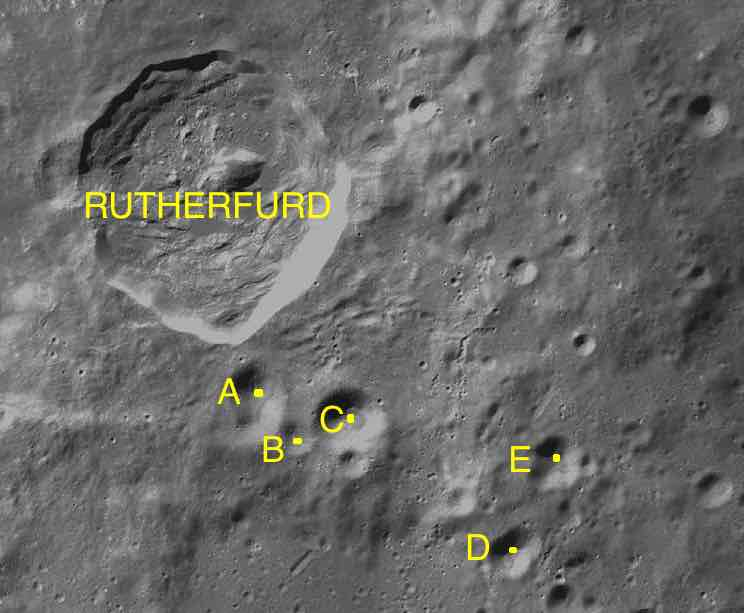
Image showing the satellite craters of Rutherfurd.

By convention these features are identified on lunar maps by placing the letter on the side of the crater midpoint that is closest to Rutherfurd.

Rutherfurd	Latitude	Longitude	Diameter
A	62.2° S	11.9° W	10 km
B	62.6° S	11.4° W	6 km
C	62.5° S	10.7° W	14 km
D	63.2° S	8.8° W	8 km
E	62.8° S	8.3° W	9 km
