= Snellius (crater) =

Crater on the Moon

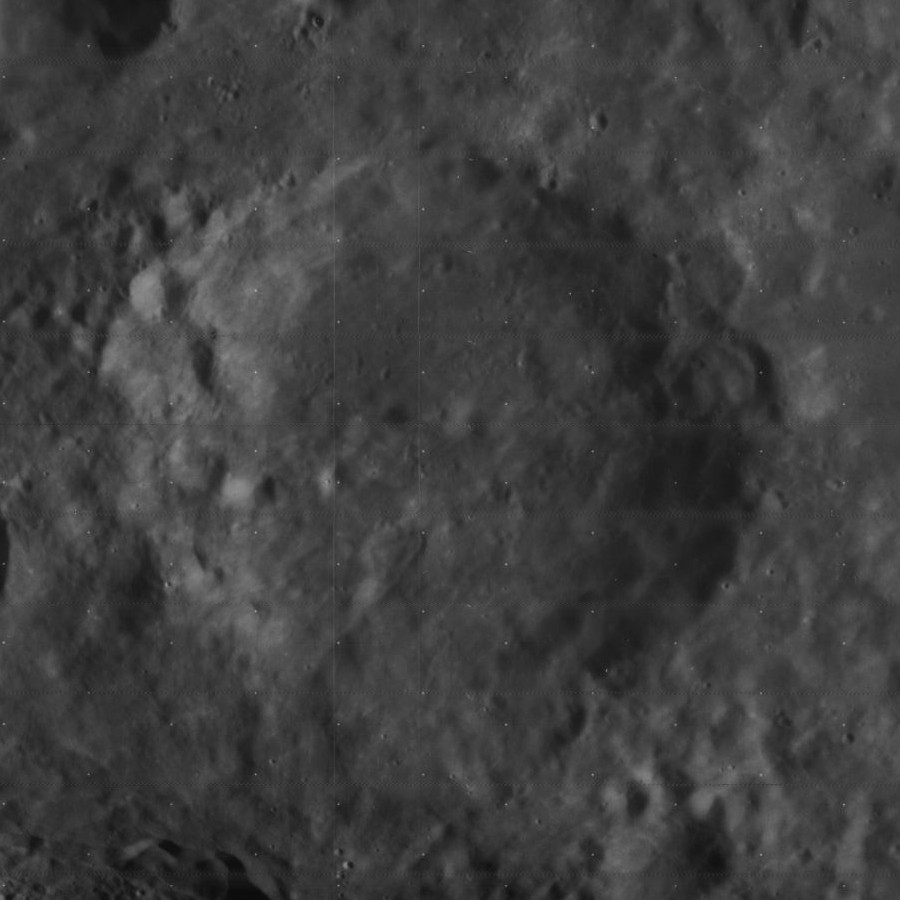
- Lunar Orbiter 4 image
- Coordinates: 29.3°S 55.7°E
- Diameter: 83 km
- Depth: 3.5 km
- Colongitude: 304° at sunrise
- Eponym: Willebrord Snell

Snellius is a lunar impact crater located near the southeast limb of the Moon.

The rim of Snellius is heavily worn and eroded, with overlapping craterlets. The floor is somewhat irregular and uneven. The western rim marks the start of the Vallis Snellius, one of the longest valleys on the Moon. It continues nearly 500 kilometers to the northwest to near the edge of Mare Nectaris. Its origin is most likely associated with the formation of the lunar mare.

To the northeast is the large crater Petavius. South of Snellius is the crater Stevinus. Just to the northwest is Snellius A, a crater with a notable ray system that overlaps the southwest reaches of Mare Fecunditatis to the north.

It is named after Dutch astronomer, mathematician and physicist, Willebrord Snellius.

== Satellite craters ==
By convention these features are identified on lunar maps by placing the letter on the side of the crater midpoint that is closest to Snellius.

Snellius	Latitude	Longitude	Diameter
A	27.4° S	53.8° E	37 km
B	30.1° S	53.1° E	29 km
C	29.0° S	51.5° E	9 km
D	28.7° S	51.5° E	9 km
E	28.0° S	51.5° E	12 km
X	27.4° S	55.1° E	7 km
Y	25.7° S	52.2° E	10 km
