= French ship Couronne (1636) =

Ship of the line of the French Navy

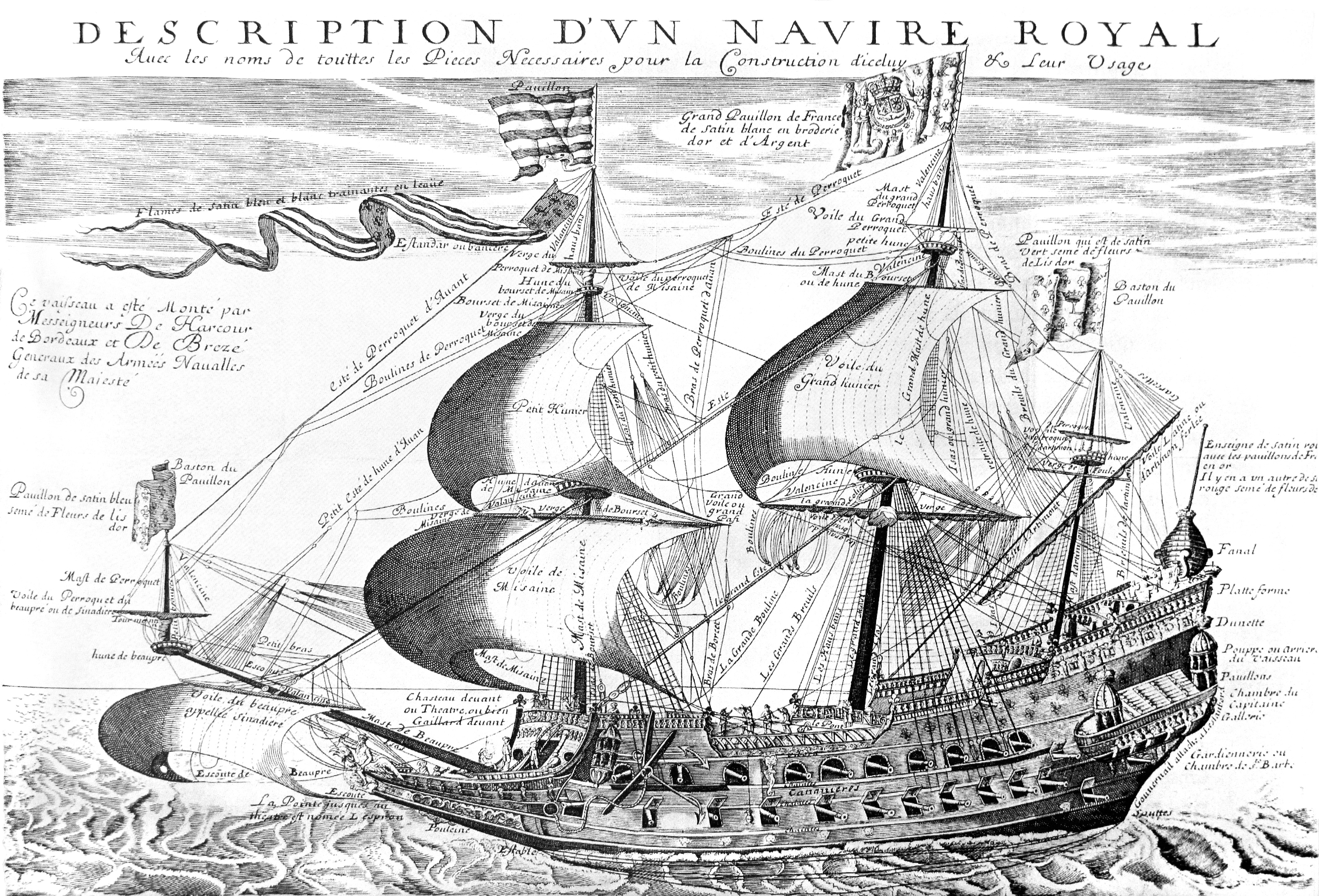
- Couronn. Frontispiece of Hydrographie by Georges Fournier, 1643.

History

Kingdom of France
- Builder: Charles Morieu; (chantier de La Roche-Bernard)
- Laid down: 1629
- Launched: 1632 or 1633
- Commissioned: 1636
- Decommissioned: 1645
- In service: 1635
- Out of service: 1645
- Fate: Broken up

General characteristics
- Tonnage: 1,500
- Length: 165 French feet overall (Note: The French (pre-metric) foot was 6.575% longer than the equivalent English foot.)(excludes 10 metre-long bowsprit) 120 French feet keel 53.5 meters
- Beam: 44 French feet 14.3 meters
- Depth of hold: 16 feet 5.2 meters
- Decks: 2 gun decks
- Complement: 500, + 9 officers; later 643 men
- Armament: 48 - 72 guns: Lower battery: 14 36-pounder long guns, 2 24-pounder long guns; Upper battery: 26 18-pounder long guns; Forecastle: 8 6-pounder long guns firing forwards; Quarterdeck: 8 6-pounder long guns firing aft
- Armour: Timber

Couronne (French for "crown") was an emblematic ship of the French Navy built by order of Richelieu.

The Couronne was the first major warship to be designed and built by the French themselves in accordance with Richelieu's plans to renew the French Navy, after a series of warships had been built by the Dutch. The construction was supervised by Isaac de Launay Razilly (died in Arcadia 1635), and overseen by the famous carpenter Charles Morieu, from Dieppe. She was being constructed at La Roche-Bernard and was one of the most advanced units of her time. After launch in 1632 or 1633, she was moved to Brouage in September 1634 where she was completed around 1635 by Mathieu Casteau. She carried up to 72 heavy guns, most on her two-deck broadsaide but also 8 firing forwards from the bow and 8 firing aft, an unusual feature until Dupuy de Lôme redesigned naval artillery.

Couronne took part in the Battle of Guetaria on 22 August 1638, and another expedition to Spain in 1639 under Henri de Sourdis.

The ship was disarmed in 1641 and broken up between 1643 and 1645.

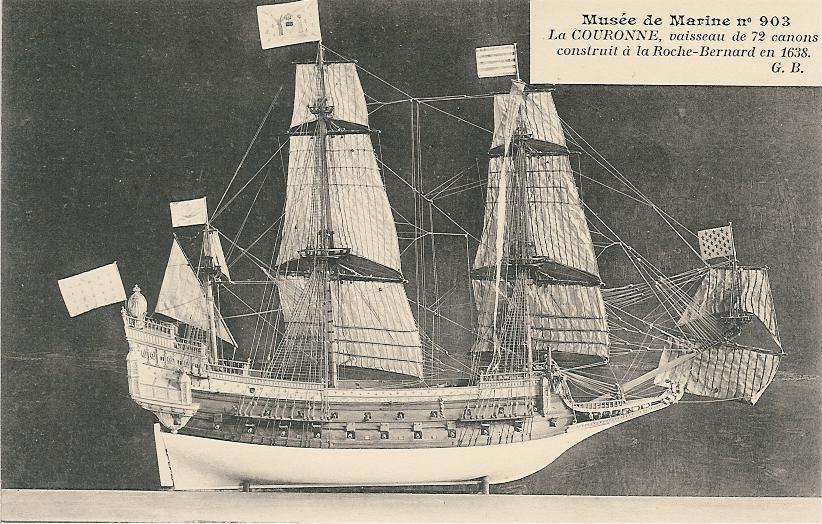
Photograph of a model lost in 1943

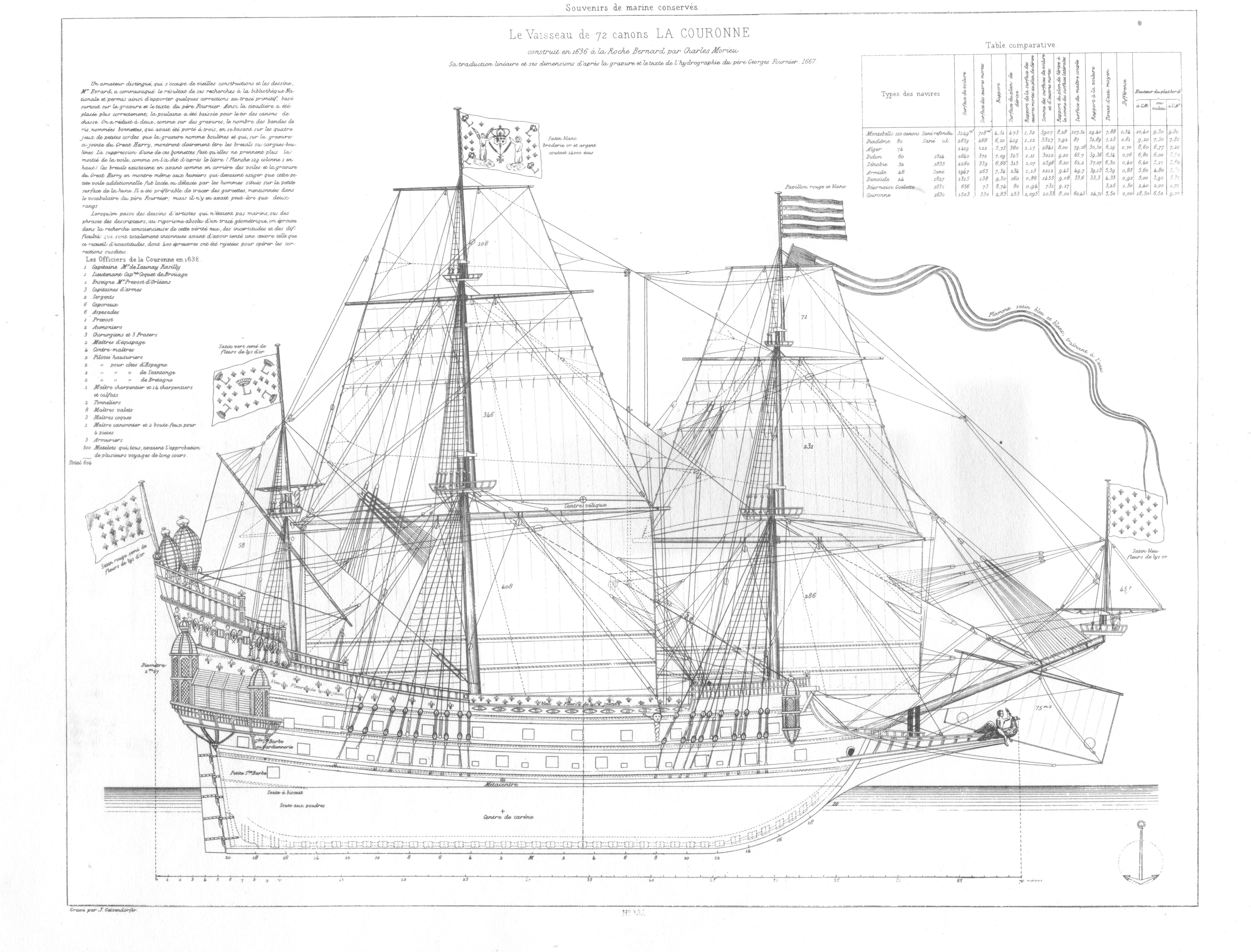
Detailed drawing of the ship

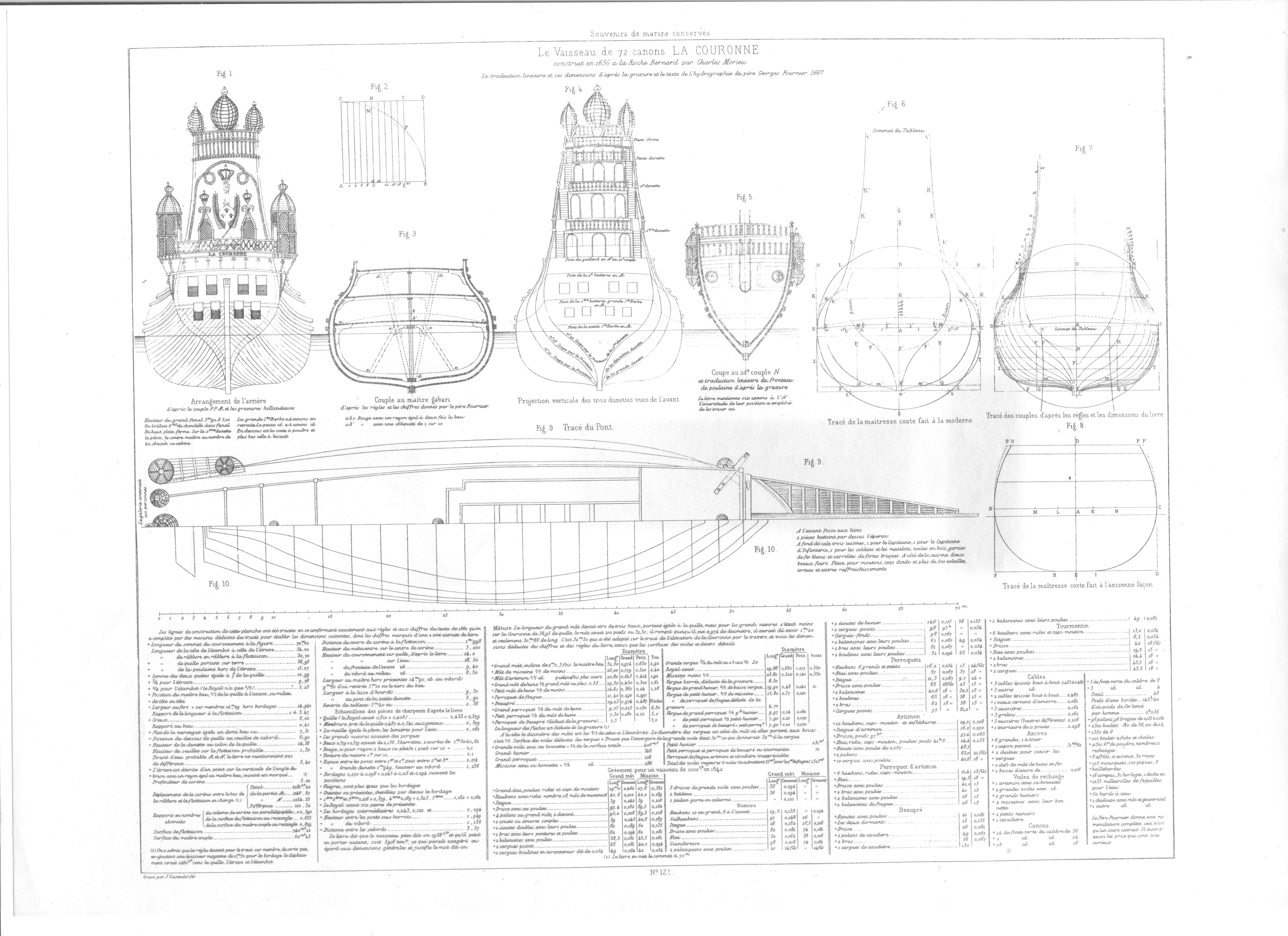
Further drawings and specifications of the ship

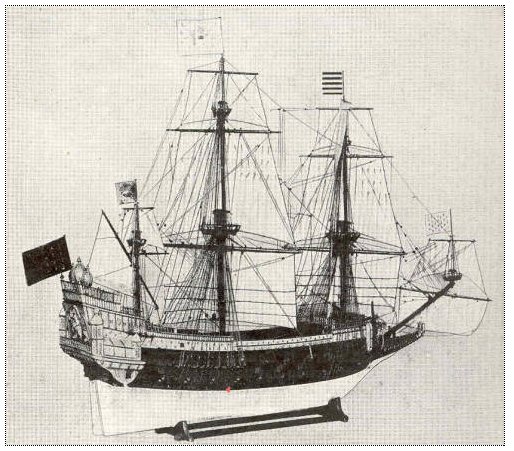

== See also ==
- Troupes de la marine
- Troupes de Marine
