= Tharp (crater) =

Crater on the Moon

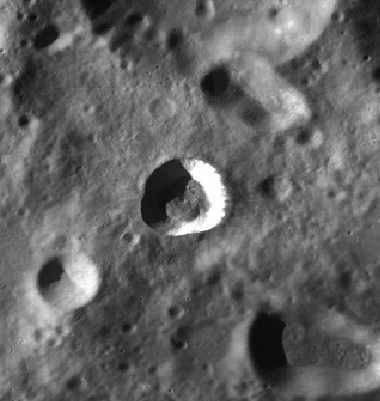
- Coordinates: 30.6°S 145.63°E
- Diameter: 13.45 km
- Formation: Copernican
- Eponym: Marie Tharp

Tharp is a small impact crater on the far side of the Moon. This formation dates to the Copernican period and has a meteoritic iron-rich impact melt. Its name was adopted by the International Astronomical Union in 2015 after Marie Tharp, a geologist and oceanographer who created the first comprehensive map of the Earth's ocean floor.
