= Crookes (crater) =

Lunar crater on the Moon

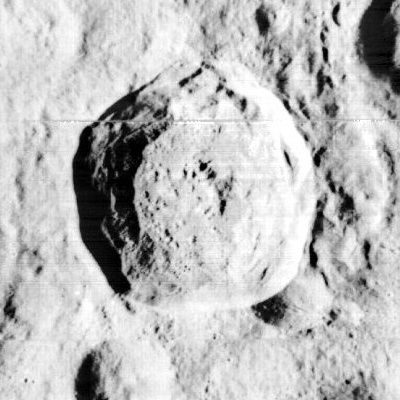
- Lunar Orbiter 1 image
- Coordinates: 10.3°S 164.5°W
- Diameter: 48.25 km (29.98 mi)
- Depth: Unknown
- Colongitude: 166° at sunrise
- Formation: Copernican
- Eponym: William Crookes

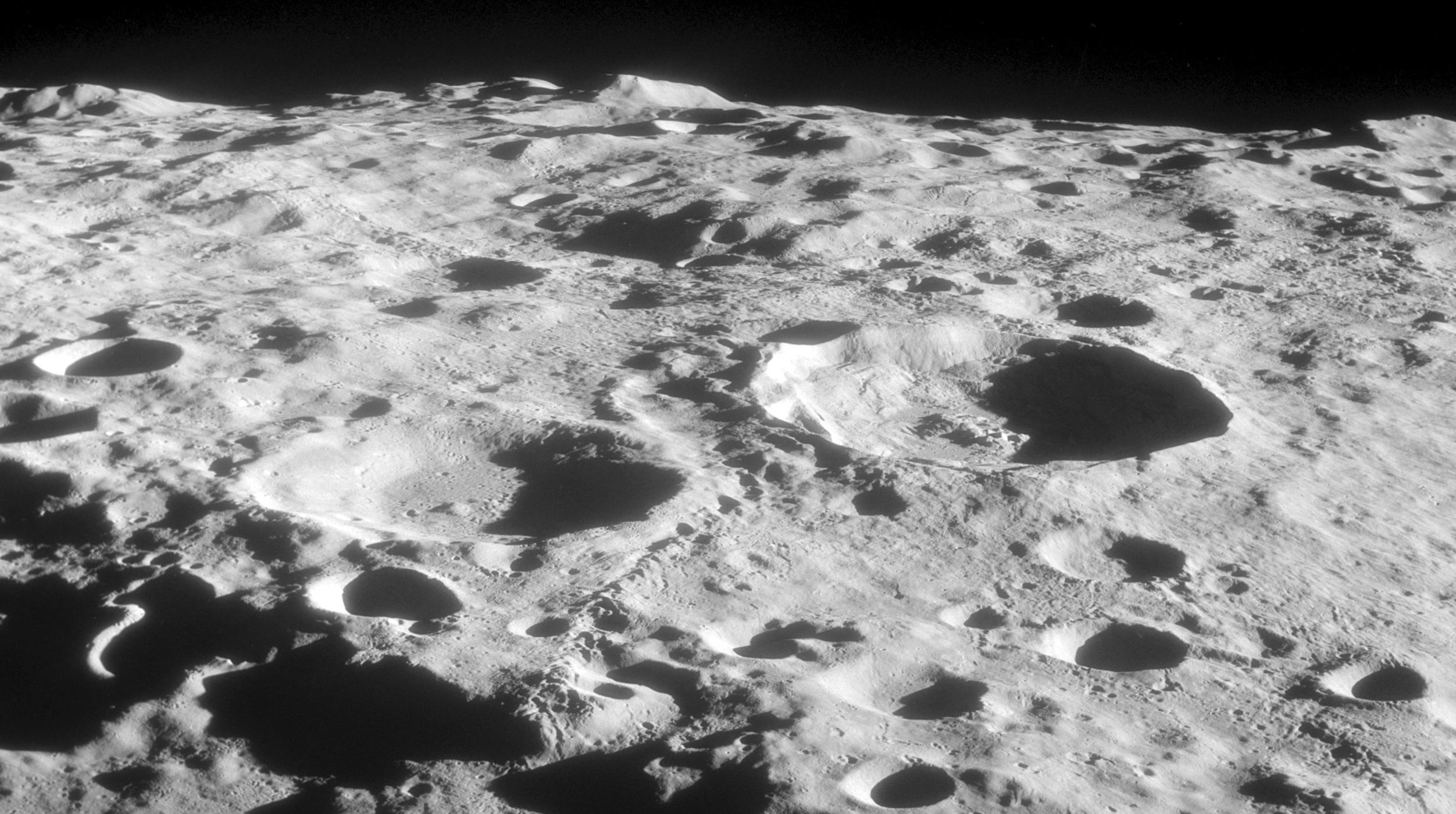
Oblique view facing south from Apollo 11. Crookes is right of center, and Crookes D is left of center. Note the prominent chain of secondary craters in the central foreground. Mohorovičić is in the background.

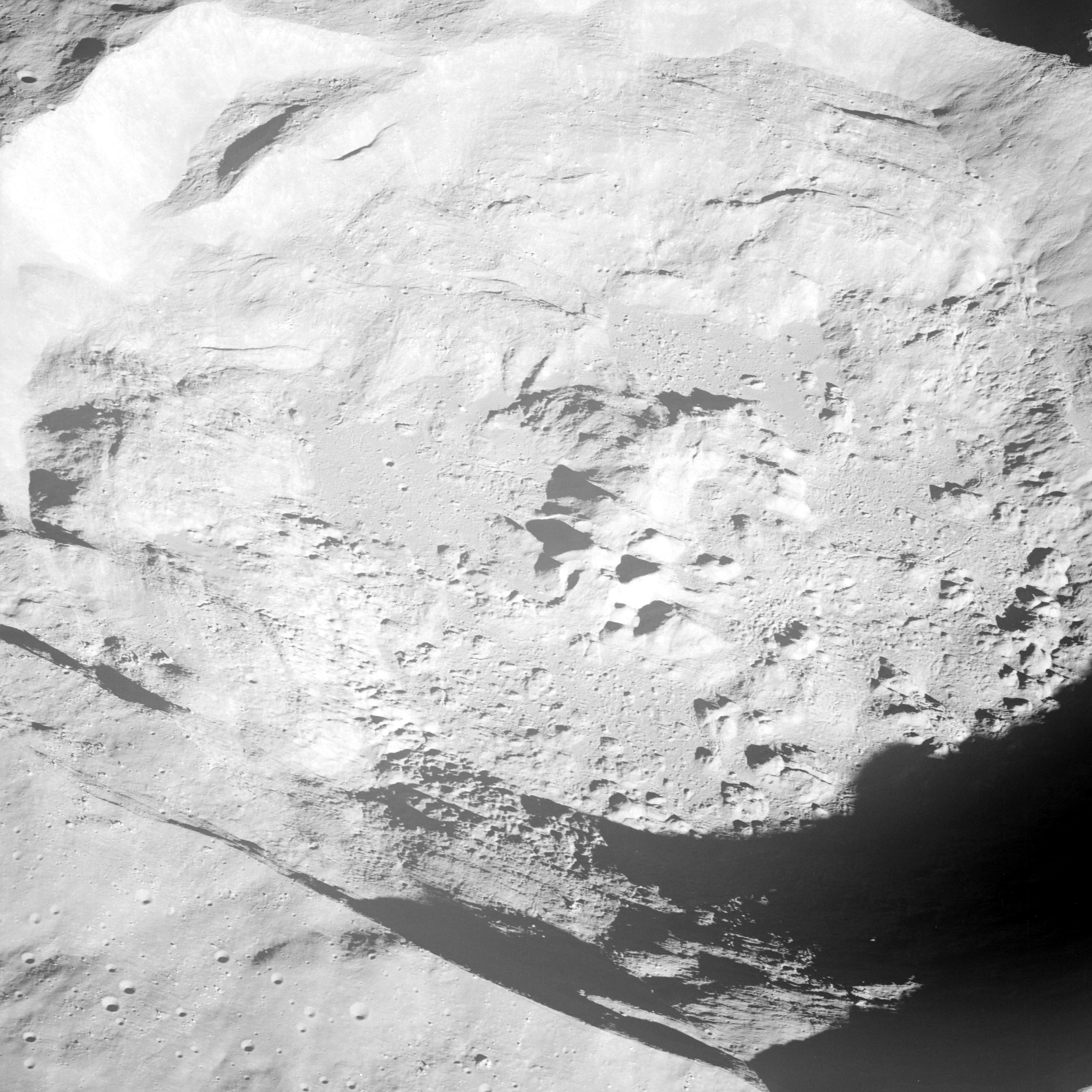
Apollo 8 image of the interior

Crookes is a lunar impact crater that lies in the highland region on the Moon's far side as seen from the Earth. It lies just to the southwest of the enormous impact basin Korolev. To the southwest of Crookes is McKellar.

The rim of Crookes crater has a relatively high albedo compared to most such formations on the Moon, and it lies at the center of a ray system. This ejecta forms a nearly continuous blanket out to at least one crater diameter before forming extended rays and a multitude of wispy markings across the surface. The ray system continues for several hundred kilometers, including extending across a substantial portion of the Korolev basin. Due to these prominent rays, Crookes is mapped as part of the Copernican System. The infrared spectrum of pure crystalline plagioclase has been identified on the western ejecta.

The impactor that created this crater likely arrived from the north-northeast at an angle of 15° to 45°. As would be expected for a relatively young crater, Crookes has a sharp-edged rim that has not been significantly eroded. The inner walls are relatively wide, and have slumped inward along the edges to form a terrace system. Offset slightly to the east of the midpoint of the crater is a small central peak on the interior floor. The spectra of the central peak fits an anorthositic gabbro mineralogy, which was excavated from a depth of 4.9 to 7.4 km.

This crater is named after William Crookes (1832–1919), an English chemist and physicist. Its designation was officially adopted by the International Astronomical Union in 1970.

== Satellite craters ==
By convention these features are identified on lunar maps by placing the letter on the side of the crater midpoint that is closest to Crookes.

Crookes	Latitude	Longitude	Diameter
D	9.6° S	162.8° W	41 km
P	11.7° S	165.8° W	21 km
X	6.6° S	166.2° W	24 km
