= Wood (crater) =

Crater on the Moon

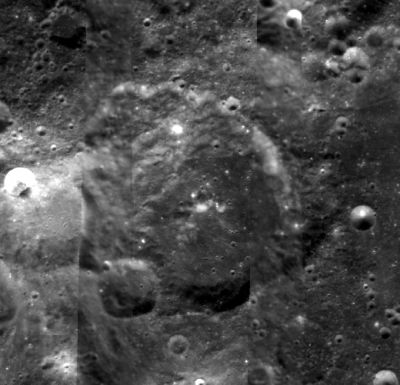
- Clementine image, with Wood at center, and S and T at left
- Coordinates: 43.66°N 121.83°W
- Diameter: 84.15 km (52.29 mi)
- Depth: Unknown
- Colongitude: 122° at sunrise
- Eponym: Robert W. Wood

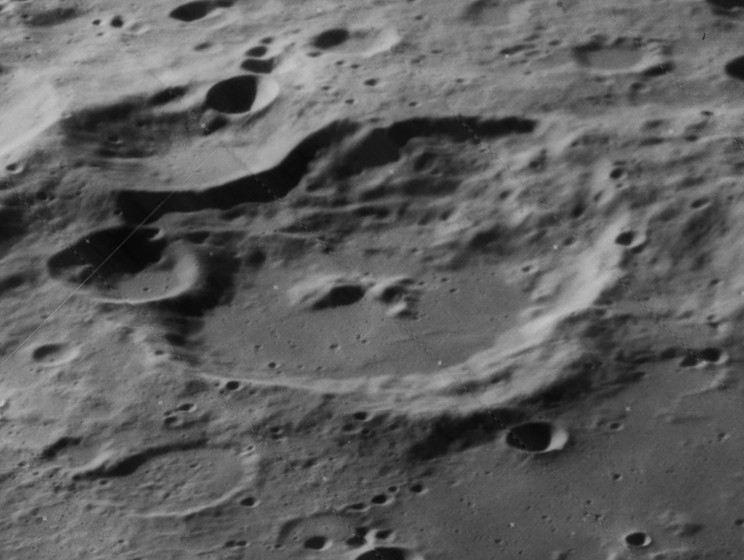
Oblique Lunar Orbiter 5 image, facing west

Wood is a lunar impact crater that lies entirely within the interior of the much larger feature Landau, a walled plain on the far side of Moon. It is located at the approximate margin of the Coulomb-Sarton Basin, a 530 km wide impact crater of Pre-Nectarian age.

Wood is situated along the northwestern part of the floor of Landau, and shares a common northwestern rim with the larger impact. The inner wall of the northwest rim extends inward about halfway toward the crater midpoint, where there is a central peak. The infrared spectrum of pure crystalline plagioclase has been identified on this rise. The rim of Wood is somewhat worn and uneven, with a small crater laid across the southwest section. The surviving interior floor is nearly level and is marked only by a few small craters.

Prior to formal naming by the IAU in 1970, Wood was called Crater 96.

== Satellite craters ==
By convention these features are identified on lunar maps by placing the letter on the side of the crater midpoint that is closest to Wood.

Wood	Coordinates	Diameter, km
S	43.46°N 124.01°W	34.0
T	43.91°N 124.32°W	10.5

Wood S is adjacent to Wood on the west side. Wood T is a small crater northwest of Wood S, which has a bright ray system.
