= Krylov (crater) =

Crater on the Moon

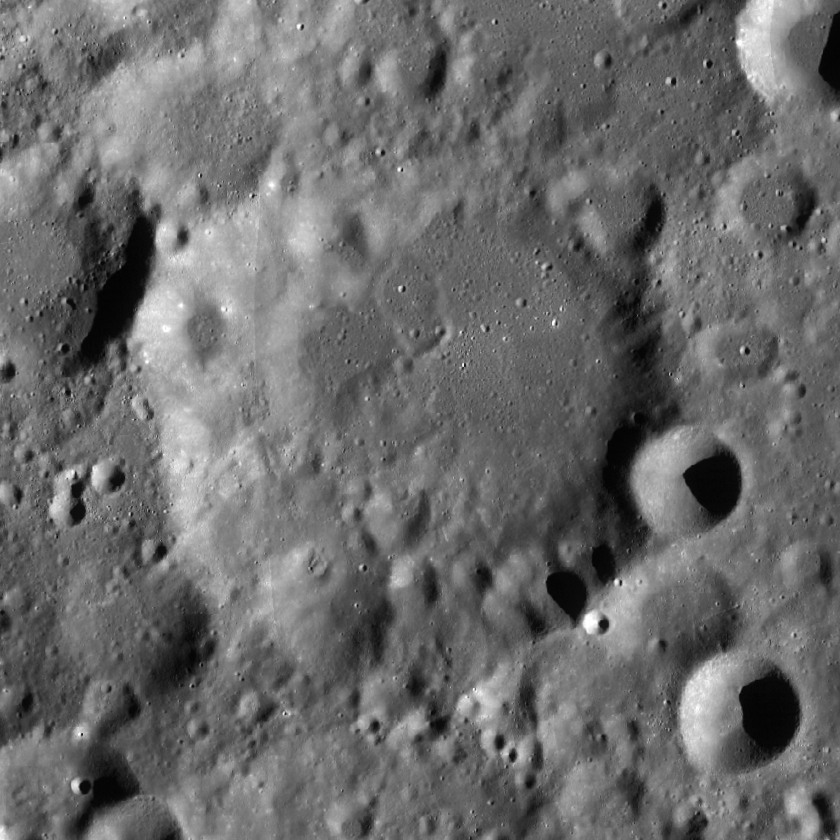
- LRO mosaic
- Coordinates: 35.6°N 165.8°W
- Diameter: 49 km
- Depth: Unknown
- Colongitude: 167° at sunrise
- Eponym: Aleksej N. Krylov

Krylov is a lunar impact crater on the far side of the Moon. It lies about one crater diameter to the northwest of Cockroft, and due west of Evershed.

This crater has been worn by impact erosion, leaving the features rounded and somewhat irregular. But the perimeter of the rim can still be traced in the rugged surrounding terrain. There is a small, fresh crater laid across the eastern rim, and some old and worn depression along the southern and western inner wall. On the whole, there is little to distinguish this crater from the multitude of other impacts in this region.

== Satellite craters ==
By convention these features are identified on lunar maps by placing the letter on the side of the crater midpoint that is closest to Krylov.

Krylov	Latitude	Longitude	Diameter
A	38.9° N	165.1° W	63 km
B	37.3° N	163.6° W	100 km
