= Thugs on Film =

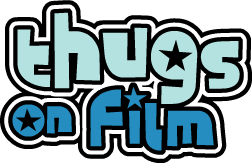
- The show's logo
- Genre: Comedy; Adult Animation
- Created by: Dan Todd
- Written by: Dan Todd; Tony Collingwood; Christopher O'Hare; Mike Fry; Scott Petertson; Paul Larson; Laura Beaumont; Allan Plenderleith; Warren Graff; Aubrey Ankrum; John Kearns; Mark McCracken; David Wendell; Joe Kwong; Dan Gabriel; Carol Stevenson; Chris Parker; Tony Ross; W. Kamau Bell; John Evershed; Dave Ingham; Joseph Purdy; John Grace; Trevor Ricketts; An Vrombaut
- Directed by: Dan Todd; W. Kamau Bell
- Voices of: Tony Hancock; Tim Huthert; Dave Boat; Vegas E. Trip; Dana Belben; Aubrey Ankrum; Tom Kane; Sally Agrell; Sumalee Montano; Sally Dana; Barbara Roscoe; Colin Mahan; Eric Bauza
- Music by: Ashsha Kin
- Countries of origin: United States; United Kingdom
- Original language: English
- No. of seasons: 2
- No. of episodes: 106

Production
- Executive producers: John Evershed; Vivian Barad
- Producers: Eric Oldrin; Julie Renwick; Mark Turner; Steven Haas; Matt Pomeroy
- Running time: 3 minutes
- Production company: Mondo Media

Original release
- Release: 1999 – 2001

Thugs On Film is an American-British adult-animated web series that ran from 1999 until 2001. The show was created by Dan Todd and produced by Mondo Media as part of their Mondo Mini Shows lineup.

== Overview ==
The show revolves around 2 film critics named Cecil and Stubby, who review recent and iconic movies at the time. Cecil is the smart, nervous and serious one, who likes a good movie and Stubby is more rambunctious and has a more immature style of humour than Cecil does. The 2 make jokes about the movies they review regardless if they hate it or not, at the end of every episode, they rate the movie with Rolexes instead of the usual 5-star method. The show would also have a trivia quiz at the end of the episodes about the movie they reviewed. Cecil and Stubby end off each episode turning the lights off in their abandoned warehouse and hold up a "The End" sign and there would be comedic dialogue between the 2.

== History ==
The show would be first teased in 1998, and have a set release date for January of 1999, but would be pushed back to May instead with their first episode being about Star Wars, every episode would be released on a Sunday. The show would receive critical acclaim online and would be added to new websites, most notably the BBC America website (Where it aired on the channel from around 2000-2001), the Washington Post website, Reel.com (which sponsored them for a while), AltaVista, IMDb and Netscape.

Mondo Media would hire animators from different companies from their area to work on the show, most notably Curious Pictures, Wild Brain and (Colossal) Pictures. They would also hire animators from around the globe like Paul Boyd from Bardel Entertainment, A.K.A. Cartoon and Natterjack Animation, Alan Lau the co-founder of Ghostbot and even entire companies like Slinky Pictures and Honeycomb Animation.

The show would receive a second season in 2001, changing the logo, lighting, scenery, theme song and changing the intro and credit sequences. The second season would have less episodes than the first one and end with the episode Ghosts of Mars in August of that year.

Later in 2007, the show would air as part of Mondo Mini Shows Classics in the Philippines on a channel called Maxx TV. Around this time, Mondo Media would get a YouTube channel and starting posted some Thugs On Film episodes on the platform.

== Movies They Reviewed (In Chronological Order) ==
=== Season 1 ===
- Star Wars
- Notting Hill
- Antz
- Austin Powers: The Spy Who Shagged Me
- The Blair Witch Project
- Big Daddy
- Inspector Gadget
- Mystery Men
- Detroit Rock City
- Outside Providence
- For The Love of The Game
- Double Jeopardy
- American Beauty
- Three Kings
- Random Hearts
- Fight Club
- The Bone Collector
- Dogma
- Sleepy Hollow
- End of Days
- Bicentennial Man
- The Talented Mr. Ripley
- Galaxy Quest
- Angela's Ashes
- The Hurricane
- Rear Window
- Eye of The Beholder
- Scream 3
- The Beach
- Wonder Boys
- A Clockwork Orange
- The Next Best Thing
- The Road to El Dorado
- Return to Me
- 28 Days
- U-571
- The Flintstones 2: Viva Rock Vegas
- Gladiator
- Battlefield Earth
- Small Time Crooks
- Mission Impossible 2
- Shaft
- Gone In 60 Seconds
- Me, Myself & Irene
- The Patriot
- Sid & Nancy
- X-Men
- Crappy Summer Movies
- The Spaghetti Western
- Autumn In New York
- Enter The Dragon
- The Crew
- Highlander 4
- The Way of The Gun
- BAIT
- Remember The Titans
- Bedazzled
- Get Carter
- A Hard Days Night
- Pay It Forward
- Charlie's Angels
- The Legend of Bagger Vance
- Dungeons & Dragons
- Unbreakable
- Vertical Limit
- The Grinch Who Stole Christmas
- What Women Want
- Castaway
- Traffic
- Hannibal
- Original Sin
- 15 Minutes

=== Season 2 ===
- Crouching Tiger, Hidden Dragon
- Shadow of The Vampire
- Snatch
- O' Brother Where Art Thou
- The Wedding Planner
- Willy Wonka & The Chocolate Factory
- James Bond Movies
- The Mexican
- Blow
- Freddy Got Fingered
- Driven
- The Mummy Returns
- Captain Corelli's Mandolin
- Josie & The Pussycats
- Pearl Harbor
- Evolution
- Tomb Raider
- Atlantis: The Lost Empire
- Dr. Dolittle 2
- A.I.
- Scary Movie 2
- Jaws
- Jurassic Park 3
- America's Sweethearts
- Planet of The Apes
- Ghosts of Mars

== Miscellaneous Episodes ==
=== Season 1 ===
- Halloween Special
- Christmas Special
- The Tossers Awards Nominations
- The Tossers Awards Show
- Summer Wrap-Up

=== Season 2 ===
- The Tossers Awards 2001 Nominations
- The Tossers Awards 2001 Show
