= Thomas Royds =

- Born: April 11, 1884; Moorside, Oldham, England
- Died: May 1, 1955 (aged 71); England
- Education: Manchester University
- Scientific career
- Fields: Solar physicist
- Workplaces: Manchester University, Kodaikanal Observatory, Indian Meteorological Service, Istanbul University

Thomas Royds (April 11, 1884 – May 1, 1955) was a British solar physicist who worked with Ernest Rutherford on the identification of alpha radiation as the nucleus of the helium atom, and who was Director of the Kodaikanal Solar Observatory, India.

== Early years ==
Thomas Royds was born April 11, 1884, in Moorside, near Oldham, Lancashire, UK. He was the third son of Edmund Royds and Mary Butterworth. His father was a cotton spinner and his mother had been a cotton weaver. His eldest brother, Robert Royds, who was 6 years older than Thomas, became an engineer and wrote books on temperature measurement and on the design of steam locomotives.

In 1897 he entered Oldham Waterloo Secondary School and in 1903 he won the King's Scholarship to Owen's College, Manchester University for three years, studying in the Honours School of Physics under Arthur Schuster.

In 1906 he took a First Class B Sc Honours degree in Physics, and stayed at Manchester doing research in spectroscopy, especially on the constitution of the electric spark. From 1907 to 1909 he worked with Ernest Rutherford (later Lord Rutherford, the father of nuclear physics) on the spectrum of radon and, more importantly, on the identification of the alpha particle as the nucleus of the helium atom, in what is called "The Beautiful Experiment." Rutherford and Royds published four joint papers.

From 1909 to 1911, as an 1851 Exhibition Scholar, he worked under Friedrich Paschen in Tübingen, Germany on spectroscopic research mainly in the infra-red, and later under Professor Heinrich Rubens in Berlin on "infra-red restrahlen."

At Manchester University in 1911, he took his D Sc degree in Physics awarded for all his research work to date.

== Middle years ==
The same year, he was appointed Assistant Director of Kodaikanal Solar Physics Observatory, South India, where he worked partly in collaboration with the director, John Evershed. They studied the displacement of the lines in the sun's spectrum, calling attention to the significance and interpretation of negative displacements, i.e., towards the violet.

Between 1913 and 1937 he produced 49 research papers published at Kodaikanal Observatory. Others, such as the one proving the presence of oxygen in the Sun's chromosphere, appeared in scientific journals, such as Nature.

He was appointed Director of Kodaikanal when Evershed retired in 1922.

In 1928, exceptional observation conditions enabled him to photograph a higher prominence on the Sun's surface than ever seen before. He also photographed the brightest and largest solar hydrogen eruption up to that date.

The following year, Dr Royds and Professor F. J. M. Stratton of Gonville and Caius College, Cambridge, led the eclipse expedition to Siam (now Thailand), to photograph a total solar eclipse. Unfortunately, clouds prevented almost all observations.

In 1936 Dr Royds acted as the Director General of Observatories in India for one year, while the DG was on leave. This entailed responsibility for the Indian Meteorological Service.

Later that year, Royds and Stratton led a solar expedition to Hokkaido, Japan, mainly to study how the wavelengths on different parts of the Sun's disc were affected by the scattered light from other parts of the disc. Their work also confirmed Einstein's theory that wavelengths of lines in the Sun's spectrum would deviate slightly from the same lines in terrestrial laboratories. This expedition was a complete success.

== Later years ==
Dr Royds came home to England on well-earned leave in 1937 and two years later officially retired.

In the year following, the post of Professor of Astronomy and Director of the Observatory at Istanbul University, Turkey, fell vacant upon the death of the German incumbent. Anxious to increase British influence there, the British Council urged Dr Royds to apply. He was accepted.

He was now 58, and the voyage out was long and arduous in wartime conditions; he had to sail round the Cape of South Africa to Cairo, and from there by small boat to Istanbul.

The first term he lectured in French, but by the second term he was able to lecture in Turkish.

When his contract with Istanbul University ended in the autumn of 1947, he returned to England, where he spent his last years in retirement. He died of a cerebral haemorrhage on 1 May 1955, leaving his widow, two daughters and a son.
