= Ewhurst, Surrey =

Village and parish in Surrey, England

Coordinates: 51.1543°N 0.4422°W

Ewhurst
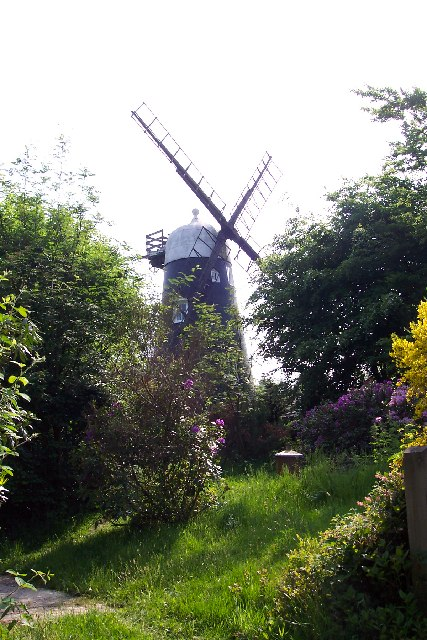
- Hurt Wood or Ewhurst windmill

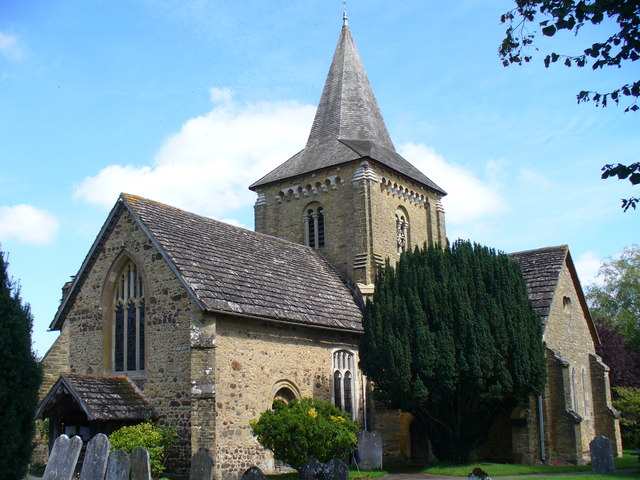
- Church of St Peter and St Paul, Ewhurst

- Location within Surrey
- Area: 23.79 km^{2} (9.19 sq mi)
- Population: 2,391 (Civil Parish 2011)
  - Density: 101/km^{2} (260/sq mi)
- OS grid reference: TQ090406
  - London: 28 mi (45 km) SW
- Civil parish: Ewhurst and Ellen's Green
- District: Waverley
- Shire county: Surrey
- Region: South East
- Country: England
- Sovereign state: United Kingdom
- Post town: Cranleigh
- Postcode district: GU6
- Dialling code: 01483
- Police: Surrey
- Fire: Surrey
- Ambulance: South East Coast
- UK Parliament: Dorking and Horley

Ewhurst /ˈjuːhɜːrst/ is a rural village and civil parish in the borough of Waverley in Surrey, England. It is located 8.3 miles (13.4 km) south-east of Guildford, 2 miles (3.2 km) east of Cranleigh, and 4.5 miles (7.2 km) south of Shere.

The parish includes the smaller hamlets of Ellen's Green and Cox Green near the border with West Sussex. At the north is Hurt Wood, a part of the Surrey Hills AONB. The Greensand Ridge also passes through this area. The rest of the parish, apart from Ewhurst village itself, is classified as an Area of Great Landscape Value (AGLV).

== History ==
Holmbury Hill with its Iron Age settlements in the parishes of Shere, Guildford borough and Abinger, Mole Valley borough Holmbury St Mary for early British settlers would have been a more suitable, accessible settlement than the denser woodland of this area.

A Roman road NNW to SSE just west of the village centre runs from Rowhook over the Sussex border where it met with England's south Stane Street (stone street) between London and Chichester the other end point is not clear, however it was traced in the reign of Victoria by James Park Harrison. The Rapley Roman villa's remains are west of the village: discoveries include a tile-kiln excavated in 1836 and from the villa itself in the 1960s, fragments of a glass goblet and an unusual vase decorated with a 'Mural Crown'.

Richard Rawlinson notes (Note: In fact the 1719 book was almost a complete republication of John Aubrey's earlier Perambulation of Surrey published under the name Natural History and Antiquities of Surrey) in 1719 the name Ewehurst appears to have been developed from the wooded hills or hurst and yew due to

"the vast quantities of yew trees that formerly abounded here."

When King John was at Guildford and Knepp Castle in West Sussex on the same day, 21 January 1215, in winter when unmade ways were foul, he very probably used the Roman road. Historian H. E. Malden commented of the village in 1911, nothing shows the backwardness of the Weald more than the absolute disuse and forgetting (and abandonment) of these lines of through passage. Ewhurst is not named in Domesday. It was part of the great royal manor of Gomshall but was probably sparsely inhabited. That there was some population soon afterwards is implied by Norman work in the church, a chapel to Shere, the earliest evidence of it as a parish was in 1291.

The richness of the Weald's natural resources led it to become an industrial centre of Britain, as both the iron and glass industries needed large amounts of timber for fuel. There is a site of a bloomery iron works at Coneyhurst Gill and glassmaking sites at Ellen's Green and Summersbury/Somersbury. The wealth of the area can also be seen in the many fine timber-framed houses dating from this medieval and Tudor period, however reliance on coal and the work of the Industrial Revolution later led to neglect, poverty, highwaymen and smuggling exacerbated by the less well trodden transportation connections.

As shown by the list of prominent Victorian and twentieth century figures, the wood nestled physical geography of the area has led to home building among wealthy individuals in the parish.

== Significant places ==
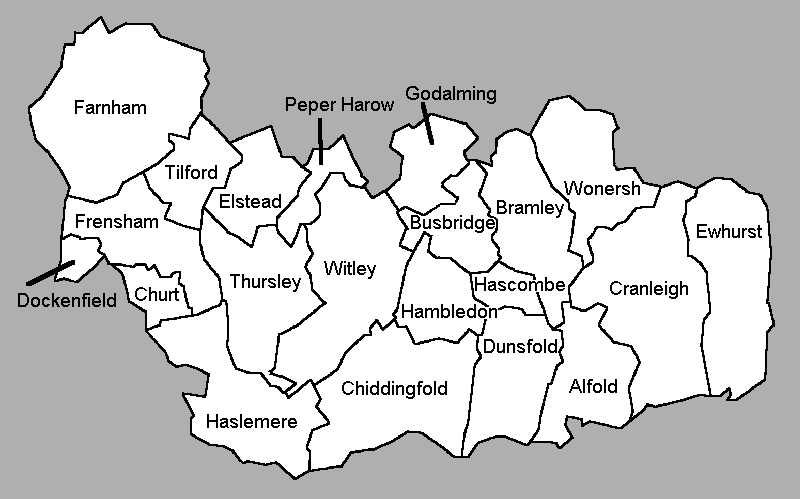
Waverley is the parish closest to Mole Valley, Surrey

As shown, Ewhurst is a narrow parish. The northeast of the area includes the large Mullard Space Science Laboratory of UCL formerly Holmbury House laboratory and several sloped copses. Woodland forms a considerable minority of land use also on the wealden clay across the parish such as Upper Canfold Wood (north of Cranleigh Road) and Buildings and Somersbury Woods (north and south of Horsham Road).

There are several country houses with historically dominant estates, upon which much agriculture and gardening continues (Note: e.g. from north to south, all have architecturally Grade II listed buildings Lukyns: Historic England. "Details from listed building database (1044318)". National Heritage List for England. Losely:Historic England. "Details from listed building database (1352797)". National Heritage List for England. Pollingfold Manor: Historic England. "Details from listed building database (1044336)". National Heritage List for England. North Breache Manor: Historic England. "Details from listed building database (1392276)". National Heritage List for England. Somersbury Manor House Historic England. "Details from listed building database (1044342)". National Heritage List for England. and Ellens or Ellens Manor Historic England. "Details from listed building database (1044332)". National Heritage List for England. Pollingfold, Somersbury, Coneyhurst, East Pollingfold and Maybanks which has been rebuilt and is near Cox Green were the five manors); the largest is Baynards Park, which formerly had a Grade II listed country house.

The Church of St Peter and St Paul built in the 12th century – largely rebuilt 1838–39 due to a collapse – apart from the nave, is a Grade I listed building.

Outlying the village, on Pitch Hill, is Marylands a Grade II* listed home by Oliver Hill, constructed in 1929–31 of sandstone with a green Swedish pantiled roof. It was built for M C Warner in a blend of Spanish architecture and Lutyens. It has been used as a film location, including for episodes of Poirot mysteries.

There are a few listed buildings closer to the church including one at Grade II*, White Hart Cottage. The East window behind the altar in the church was commissioned from Archibald Keightley Nicholson as a memorial window for Captain William Ralph Frecheville who was executed after capture 9 January 1920 aged 24, in Rostov-on-Don, Russia, whilst serving as part of the Allied intervention in the Russian Civil War.

There are several businesses in the main village, a village hall for community events and public houses including The Bull's Head by the village green, and at Ellen's Green and Ewhurst Green which is a continuation of the village just south of the main village.. The Bull's Head inn was refurbished in 2024.

== Schools ==
- Hurtwood House residential aged 16–18, renowned for its theatre and media departments and among the most expensive schools in the UK.
- Ewhurst C of E Infant School.

== Sport and leisure ==
The village's area includes Sayers Croft, a former evacuee centre that is now an outdoor and environmental education centre. The centre has hosted over half a million visitors since it was built in 1939.

The village is also home to Hurtwood Polo Club, which aside from polo, holds several music events and shows throughout the year.

== Demography and housing ==
2011 Census Homes
Output area	Detached	Semi-detached	Terraced	Flats and apartments	Caravans/temporary/mobile homes	shared between households
(Civil Parish)	533	249	89	48	4	0

The average level of accommodation in the region composed of detached houses was 28%, the average that was apartments was 22.6%.

2011 Census Key Statistics
Output area	Population	Households	% Owned outright	% Owned with a loan	hectares
(Civil Parish)	2,480	923	46.3%	33.8%	2,379

The proportion of households in the civil parish who owned their home outright compares to the regional average of 35.1%. The proportion who owned their home with a loan compares to the regional average of 32.5%. The remaining % is made up of rented dwellings (plus a negligible % of households living rent-free).

== Notable residents ==
- Janet Gladys Aitken (1908–1988), socialite, horsebreeder, equestrian, and helicopter pilot
- Kenneth Biggs (1911–1998), soldier awarded the George Cross
- Bernard Bosanquet (1877–1936), cricketer
- Gary Brooker (1945–2022), founder of Procol Harum
- Eric Clapton, who is known to play at the Church of England church
- Dugald Clerk (1854–1932) who designed the world's first successful two-stroke engine
- Jim Davidson, comedian
- Henry Doulton (1820–1897), businessman, inventor and manufacturer of pottery
- John Evershed (1864–1956), astronomer and discoverer of the Evershed effect
- Mary Acworth Orr Evershed (1867–1949), astronomer and Dante scholar
- Geoffrey Greig (1897–1960), cricketer
- Bruce Grobbelaar, former Liverpool FC footballer.
- Diane James, former MEP for UKIP
- Kenney Jones of Small Faces and The Who
- Jodie Kidd, former model, racing driver, TV personality and food entrepreneur
- Jonathan King, former songwriter and record producer.
- Hugh F. Locke King (1848–1926), Brooklands motor circuit entrepreneur
- Chapman Pincher, journalist
- Mike Rutherford, founding member of Genesis
- Brough Scott, journalist

== Notes and references ==
=== Notes ===
References
