= Mary Acworth Evershed =

British astronomer, Dante scholar and plant collector

Mary Acworth Evershed FRAS
- Born: Mary Acworth Orr; 1 January 1867; Plymouth Hoe, Devon, England
- Died: 25 October 1949 (aged 82); Ewhurst, Surrey, England
- Other names: M.A. Orr
- Known for: Astronomy and scholarship of Dante
- Spouse: John Evershed

Mary Acworth Evershed FRAS (née Orr; 1 January 1867 – 25 October 1949) was a British astronomer and scholar. Her work on Dante Alighieri was written under the pen name M.A. Orr.

== Early life ==
Mary Acworth Orr was born to Lucy Erskine Acworth (1841–1904) and Andrew Orr (ca. 1830–1870) on 1 January 1867 at Plymouth Hoe. Her father was an officer in the Royal Artillery, who married in 1859. Mary grew up in Wimborne and South Stoke in Somerset. Mary’s youngest brother was the colonial administrator Charles William James Orr.

When she was 20, Orr travelled abroad with her sisters and, when in Florence (1888–1890) began a study of the works of Dante, which led to her lifelong interest in astronomical references in Dante's poems.

== Astronomical career ==
In 1890, Orr moved with her family to Australia. She found there was no good guide to the southern stars, so wrote An Easy Guide to the Southern Stars, with the encouragement of John Tebbutt, the leading astronomer in Australia at the time.

In 1895, she moved back to England and met fellow British astronomer John Evershed when they both participated in an expedition to view a total solar eclipse of 9 August 1896 in Norway Orr subsequently joined the British Astronomical Association (BAA). At this time, the BAA enjoyed the membership of intellectual women barred from the (then) all-male Royal Astronomical Society. During this time, she became friends with Agnes Clerke and Annie Scott Dill Maunder, both notable for their contributions to historical astronomy.

Orr married Evershed in 1906. Up to this time, he had worked as an industrial chemist with solar physics as a hobby but, in 1906, was offered a post as assistant astronomer at Kodaikanal Observatory in India. Mary and John moved to Kodaikanal (visiting notable astronomical locations in the United States on the way) to allow him to take up the post in 1907. While in India, Mary collected plants from the region, which were ultimately deposited in the British Museum herbarium. While at Kodaikanal, Mary completed an index to the library at the observatory. In 1909, she is recorded as measuring the position angles and heights of solar prominences from photographs taken at the observatory’s spectroheliograph. In 1915, she accompanied her husband on an astronomical expedition to Srinagar in Kashmir.

In 1916, Mary was elected to the membership of the Astronomical Society of the Pacific. On the 9 May 1924 as a Fellow of the Royal Astronomical Society. Lastly, she directed the BAA’s Historical Section from its inception in 1930 to 1944. Throughout her life, Evershed travelled to numerous solar eclipses, including Norway in 1896, Algiers in 1900, Western Australia in 1922, Yorkshire in 1927, and Greece/Aegean Sea in 1936.

== Dante scholarship ==
Evershed was also greatly interested in poetry, and while she loved Dante's work, she was worried about his cosmography. Her 1914 book Dante and the Early Astronomers helped clarify Dante's science, as accurate as it could be given existing knowledge.

== Bibliography ==
- Two Letters Addressed to the Bishop of Ripon, on Secularism, the Holy Scriptures, and the Geographical Position of the Garden of Eden (1876)
- Easy Guide to Southern Stars (1896)
- Southern Stars: A Guide to the Constellations Visible in the Southern Hemisphere, preface by John Tebbutt, with a miniature star atlas (London, 1896)
- Black Star-Lore. Journal of the British Astronomical Association, vol. 9 (1898), pp.68-70
- Variable Stars of Long Period. Journal of the British Astronomical Association, vol. 15 (1905), pp.129-132
- Dante and Mediaeval Astronomy. The Observatory vol. 34 (1911), p. 440 (as Mr. and Mrs. Evershed)
- Some Types of Prominences Associated with Sun-Spots. Monthly Notices of the Royal Astronomical Society, vol. 73 (1913), p. 422
- The Origin of the Constellations. The Observatory vol. 36 (1913), p. 179
- Dante and the Early Astronomers. Gall & Inglis (1914)
- The Sea-goat. The Observatory vol. 37 (1914), p. 322
- Stars of the Southern Skies. Longmans, Green & Co. (1915)
- Results of Prominence Observations. Memoirs of the Kodaikanal Observatory, vol. 1, pt. 2 (1917), (as J and M A Evershed)
- Recent Work at Arcetri. The Observatory vol. 58 (1932), p. 254 (as Mr. and Mrs. Evershed)
- Arab Astronomy. The Observatory vol. 58 (1935), p. 237
- Who's Who in the Moon. Memoirs of the British Astronomical Association vol. 34 (1938), pt. 1, pp. 1-130. (an index to named lunar craters)

== Awards and honours ==
- 1924 – Fellow of the Royal Astronomical Society
- 1971 - The minor planet 12628 Acworthorr is discovered and named after Evershed.
