= Murakami (crater) =

Crater on the Moon

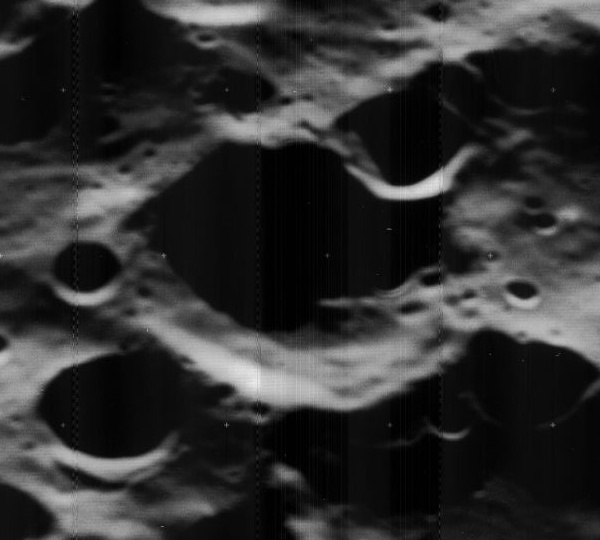
- Oblique Lunar Orbiter 5 image
- Coordinates: 23.3°S 140.5°W
- Diameter: 45 km
- Depth: Unknown
- Colongitude: 141° at sunrise
- Eponym: Harutaro Murakami

Murakami is an impact crater on the far side of the Moon. To the south-southeast is the crater Mariotte. Murakami partly overlaps the western rim of the satellite crater Mariotte Z. To the southeast of Murakami, and to the northeast of Mariotte, is the smaller crater Das. This is a roughly circular, bowl-shaped formation. There is some erosion along the rim, including smaller craters overlapping the rim edge to the south and northeast. There is a white patch of higher-albedo material just to the west of Murakami.

This feature was previously designated Mariotte Y before being assigned this name by the IAU. It is named after Japanese astronomer Harutaro Murakami (1872–1947).
