= 64 Zoo Lane =

Children's television series

- Title card for the third and fourth series
- Also known as: Zoo Lane; 64, rue du Zoo
- Genre: Fantasy; Educational
- Created by: An Vrombaut
- Written by: An Vrombaut; Keith Brumpton; John Grace; Jill Brett; Gillian Corderoy
- Directed by: An Vrombaut; Albert Pereira-Lazaro; Julien Cayot
- Voices of: Lara Wollington; Keith Wickham; Lewis McLeod; Matt Wilkinson; Adrienne Posta; Bob Saker; Anna Bentinck; Dan Russell; Ciara Janson
- Theme music composer: Rowland Lee (music); An Vrombaut (lyrics)
- Opening theme: 64 Zoo Lane theme song
- Ending theme: 64 Zoo Lane theme song (Instrumental)
- Composer: Rowland Lee
- Countries of origin: United Kingdom; France
- Original languages: English; French
- No. of series: 4
- No. of episodes: 104 (list of episodes)

Production
- Executive producers: Jonathan Peel (S1, S4); Roch Lener (S1, S4); Ken Anderson (S4)
- Producers: Ken Anderson (seasons 1–3); Jill McGreal (seasons 1–2); Jonathan Peel (seasons 2–3); Roch Lener (seasons 2–3)
- Editors: Thibaud Caquet (seasons 1–2); Alain Lavalle (season 3); David Alier (season 3)
- Running time: 11 minutes
- Production companies: Millimages; Zoo Lane Productions; The Itsy Bitsy Entertainment Company (season 2)

Original release
- Network: La Cinquième/France 5 (France); ZDF (Germany seasons 1–2); CBeebies (UK seasons 3–4)
- Release: 18 February 1999 – 28 February 2013

64 Zoo Lane (French: 64, rue du Zoo) is a children's animated television series created by Belgian-born English author and animator An Vrombaut. It was produced by Millimages and Zoo Lane Productions, with the first two series co-produced in association with ZDF and ZDF Enterprises. The series follows Lucy, a young girl who lives next door to a zoo and hears bedtime stories from its animal residents.

The series originally aired from 18 February 1999 to 3 December 2003 for its first two series. After a seven-year hiatus, it returned for two additional series, which aired on CBeebies from 6 February 2010 to 28 February 2013. A total of 104 episodes were produced across four series.

The series was broadcast in France on La Cinquième (later France 5), in Germany on ZDF, and in the United Kingdom on CBeebies.

== Synopsis ==
The series follows Lucy, a seven-year-old girl who lives next door to a zoo at 64 Zoo Lane. Each night, she visits her animal friends, who tell her a bedtime story before she goes to sleep. Among the recurring characters are Georgina the Giraffe, Nelson the Elephant, the monkey twins Tickles and Giggles, Boris the Bear, and Molly the Hippopotamus.

The stories explore themes of friendship, kindness, responsibility, and helping others. At the end of each story, its moral is reflected upon before Georgina returns Lucy to her bedroom through the window. In later episodes, Lucy yawns before falling asleep, whereas in the original episodes she drifts off as the storytelling ends.

The series is designed to support early childhood learning by encouraging language development through expressive narration and dialogue, while its stories promote social and emotional learning, including friendship, empathy, and caring for others.

An Vrombaut also wrote and illustrated six 64 Zoo Lane picture books based on stories from the television series.

== Episodes ==
Season	Episodes	Originally released	
Season	Episodes	First released	Last released
Pilot		April 13, 1994	
1	26	September 6, 1999 (US/Canada)	December 28, 1999 (Germany)
2	26	July 8, 2001 (Germany)	January 6, 2002 (Germany)
3	26	February 6, 2010	March 3, 2011
4	26	October 28, 2012	February 28, 2013

== Characters ==
=== Main characters ===
- Lucy (voiced by Ciara Janson in Seasons 1-2, Alice Hearing in Season 3, and Lara Wollington in Season 4) – A 7-year-old human girl.
- Georgina the Giraffe (voiced by Adrienne Posta) – A giraffe with blue-coloured dots. She gets carried away with her long neck tricks and gets all knotted up during her life in Africa.
- Nelson the Elephant (voiced by Keith Wickham) – A light yellow-green-coloured elephant, who is Nigel's uncle.
- Molly the Hippopotamus (voiced by Anna Bentinck) – A blue-coloured hippopotamus.
- Boris the Bear (voiced by Lewis McLeod in Seasons 1-2, and Matt Wilkinson in Seasons 3-4) – a brown grizzling bear from North America.
- Giggles and Tickles the Monkeys (voiced by Adrienne Posta and Anna Bentinck) – two playful prankster monkeys though their practical jokes can sometimes cause trouble.

=== African characters ===
- Nathalie the Antelope (voiced by Adrienne Posta) – An antelope who loves to dance and jump around.
- Audrey the Ostrich (voiced by Anna Bentinck) – An ostrich who is very wise and often gives advice to other animals.
- Reginald the Lion (voiced by Lewis McLeod) – A lion whose naps would often get disturbed. While not napping, he is often seen licking a bone.
- The Snip Snip Bird (voiced by Bob Saker) – A green-coloured bird, who lives at the top of the mountain. He resembles a peacock because of his big, beautiful tail.
- King Snake (voiced by Keith Wickham)
- Victor the Crocodile (voiced by Keith Wickham) – A grumpy crocodile who acts cruel but deep down he cares about others.
- Kevin the Crocodile (voiced by Anna Bentinck) – A young crocodile who is friends with Toby and Doris.
- Doris the Duck (voiced by Adrienne Posta) – A young duck who is friend with Kevin and Toby. She is very helpful but she can also be a little bossy.
- Toby the Tortoise (voiced by Bob Saker) – A blue-coloured tortoise who is a little self-conscious because of being slow.
- Isabel the Flamingo (voiced by Adrienne Posta)
- Mirabelle the Flamingo (voiced by Anna Bentinck)
- Annabelle the Flamingo (voiced by Anna Bentinck)
- Herbert the Warthog (voiced by Keith Wickham) – A warthog who is fond of watermelons. He is a great musician and loves bathing in mud, but sometimes he is messy and never cleans up.
- Zed the Zebra (voiced by Lewis McLeod) – A zebra who runs very fast.
- Alan the Aardvark (voiced by Keith Wickham) – An aardvark who is usually seen eating ants.
- Ronald the Rhinoceros (voiced by Keith Wickham) – A rhinoceros who likes breaking rocks into pieces.
- The Tic Tic Bird (voiced by Bob Saker) – A colourful bird (possibly oxpecker), who is Ronald's best friend.
- William the Weaverbird (voiced by Bob Saker) – A bird who is often seen building a nest.
- Pauline the Pelican (voiced by Adrienne Posta) – A pelican who is fond of fish. She is a little clumsy but also very nice and friendly.
- Nigel the Elephant Calf (voiced by Anna Bentinck) - A calf who is Nelson's nephew.
- Harry the Hyena (voiced by Lewis McLeod)
- Edna the Hyena (voiced by Adrienne Posta)
- Hyena Pups Holly and Johnnie (voiced by Anna Bentinck and Bob Saker)
- Seamus the Stork (voiced by Jonathan Guy Lewis) – A stork who flies very fast.
- Eddie the Hippopotamus (voiced by Lewis McLeod) – A young and mischievous hippopotamus who is Molly's nephew.
- Henrietta the Hairy Hippopotamus (voiced by Anna Bentinck) – A furry hippopotamus who is Molly's cousin. Due to hair all over her body, she is bullied by her friends.
- Cleopatra "Patsy" the Porcupine (voiced by Anna Bentinck)
- Casper the Chameleon – (voiced by Matt Wilkinson) – Casper is a cheeky chameleon who likes to camouflage. Ignoring Granddad Chameleon's warning, he gets into trouble.
- Granddad Chameleon (voiced by Keith Wickham)
- Dennis the Dromedary (voiced by Keith Wickham) – A curious young dromedary.
- Gary the Dromedary (voiced by Lewis McLeod) – Dennis's uncle.
- Dr. Gordon Gorilla (voiced by Keith Wickham) – Dr. Gordon Gorilla is Africa's physician and Giggles and Tickles' uncle. He helps Georgina untie her neck after a show-off one day.
- Esmerelda the Snake (voiced by Adrienne Posta) – A snake who collects shells and likes having everything clean. Unfortunately her home is destroyed by a sandstorm.
- Cousin Chuckles the Monkey (voiced by Lewis McLeod) - Giggles and Tickles' cousin.
- Lily the Ostrich (voiced by Adrienne Posta) – A young girl ostrich who is Audrey's daughter and Doogal's big sister.
- Doogal the Ostrich (voiced by Anna Bentinck) – A young boy ostrich who is Audrey's son and Lily's little brother.
- Rosie the Rhinoceros (voiced by Anna Bentinck)
- Petula the Parrot (voiced by Adrienne Posta)

=== North American characters ===
- Melanie the Moose (voiced by Adrienne Posta) – A female moose with antlers. She is clumsy, but kind.
- Beverly the Beaver (voiced by Anna Bentinck) – A beaver that is often trying to perfect her dam. She speaks with a US accent.
- Randolph the Raccoon (voiced by Dan Russell) – A raccoon who grows a yield of mushrooms. He speaks with a Southern drawl.
- Barbara the Bison (voiced by Anna Bentinck) – A baby bison.
- Chipmunks Alfie and Charlie (voiced by Bob Saker and Matt Wilkinson)
- Mr. and Mrs. Bison (voiced by Anna Bentinck and Dan Russell) – Barbara's parents.

=== South American characters ===
- Adam the Armadillo (voiced by Keith Wickham) – An armadillo who likes to roll.
- Jazz the Jaguar (voiced by Dan Russell)
- Leopoldo the Llama (voiced by Lewis McLeod in Seasons 1-2, and Matt Wilkinson in Seasons 3-4)
- Taco the Toucan (voiced by unknown)
- Annie the Anaconda (voiced by unknown)
- Duddley the Sloth (voiced by Bob Saker)
- Itchy Quatzel the Mysterious Mountain (voiced by unknown)
- Tallulah the Toucan (voiced by unknown)

=== Australian characters ===
- Joey the Kangaroo (voiced by Keith Wickham) – A young kangaroo who has trouble in learning to jump but finally learnt to do so.
- Jimmy the Kangaroo (voiced by Lewis McLeod in Seasons 1-2, and Matt Wilkinson in Seasons 3-4) – A young kangaroo who used to bully Joey, but later they become friends.
- Phoebe the Koala (voiced by Adrienne Posta) – A young koala who is friends with Jimmy and Joey. She is very shy and self-conscious.
- Wally "Two-Trees" the Wombat (voiced by Keith Wickham) - A very old wombat who acts as the Shaman of the Outback.
- Carrie the Cockatoo (voiced by Adrienne Posta)
- Kangaroos Janet and Elvis (voiced by unknown) - Joey's parents.
- Janice the Kangaroo (voiced by Adrienne Posta)
- Mr. Platypus (voiced by Lewis McLeod)
- Julie the Kangaroo (voiced by unknown) - Jimmy's mother.
- Ribbit the Frog (voiced by unknown)

=== North Pole characters ===
- Snowbert the Polar Bear (voiced by Dan Russell) – A polar bear who is Boris' northern cousin. He used to live alone until he meets Sidney the Seal. He likes making ice sculptures.
- Sidney the Seal (voiced by Keith Wickham) – A seal who befriends Snowbert.

=== Mossy Bay characters ===
- Jamie the Baby Puffin (voiced by Anna Bentinck) - A young puffin who can cause silly chaos.
- Puffins Thomas, Sharon and Lewis (voiced by Lewis McLeod (as Thomas), Bob Saker (as Lewis), and Anna Bentinck (as Sharon))
- Hercule Moustache the Walrus (voiced by unknown)
- Thelma the Whale (voiced by Anna Bentinck)
- Gunnar the Seagull (voiced by Dan Russell)
- Jack Big Claw the Crab (voiced by unknown)

=== Asiatic characters ===
- Bao Bao the Giant Panda (voiced by unknown)
- Gertie the Goat (voiced by Adrienne Posta)
- Cassandra the Crane (voiced by Anna Bentinck)
- Horace the Hare (voiced by Keith Wickham)
- Confuse-us the Carp (voiced by unknown)

== Broadcast ==
The series has aired on CBBC, Disney Channel, CBeebies and Sky Kids in the UK. Internationally, the series was aired on Fox Family (now Freeform), Noggin (now Nick Jr.) and Sprout in the United States, ABC for Kids in Australia, and France 5 in France. In Canada, TFO still airs it. It is part of the Club Junior lineup. The United States airings were redubbed with American accents, with some members of the original voice cast redubbing their own performances, including Ciara Janson as Lucy, Keith Wickham as Nelson, Anna Bentinck as Molly, and Lewis McCloud as Boris.

On 26 April 2012, BBC Worldwide acquired the worldwide licensing rights to the series outside France from Millimages.

== Home media ==
=== France ===
DVDs of the series have been released by companies like France Télévisions Distribution (through Warner Home Video) and Millimages themselves (through Paramount Home Entertainment).

=== United Kingdom ===
A VHS release from Buena Vista Home Entertainment was planned for release in 2001, but was cancelled for unknown reasons.

In 2004, Maverick Entertainment signed a UK home video agreement with Millimages, and released three VHS/DVDs of the series.

On 26 August 2013, Abbey Home Media released a DVD called "The Story of the Jungle Ball", containing nine episodes from the fourth season.

=== United States ===
From 2008-2009, PorchLight Home Entertainment released three DVDs of the series, each containing 8 episodes.
