= Geoffrey Greig =

English cricketer

Cricket information
- Batting: Right-handed
- Bowling: Right-arm fast

Career statistics
| Competition | First-class |
|---|---|
| Matches | 20 |
| Runs scored | 238 |
| Batting average | 7.93 |
| 100s/50s | 0/0 |
| Top score | 37 |
| Balls bowled | 2,231 |
| Wickets | 34 |
| Bowling average | 39.61 |
| 5 wickets in innings | 1 |
| 10 wickets in match | 0 |
| Best bowling | 7/86 |
| Catches/stumpings | 7/– |
- Source: CricInfo, 7 November 2022

Geoffrey George Fenner Greig (15 August 1897 – 24 October 1960) was an English first-class cricketer. He was a right-handed batsman and right arm fast bowler who played 18 times for Worcestershire (and twice for Oxford University) in the early 1920s.

Born in Southwold, Suffolk, Greig made his first-class debut for Worcestershire against Hampshire in May 1920, going wicketless in the first innings but taking 4–119 in the second; his maiden first-class wicket was that of Hampshire opener Alex Bowell. He also hit 37 in the first innings, which was to remain his highest score. After another game for the county a few days later, he played his two matches for Oxford, though met with little success in either of them.

In Worcestershire's final game of the 1920 County Championship, Greig enjoyed his best performance with the ball, claiming 7–86 in Lancashire's first innings, five of the dismissed batsmen being out bowled. His feat was in vain, however, as Lancashire triumphed by nine wickets to leave the county languishing in 16th place in the final Championship table.

Grieg played five matches in 1921, taking nine wickets at 40 apiece, but after that his first-class career was almost at an end, and he was to play only two more games, these coming almost four years later. Against Warwickshire he bowled only five overs, but took what was to prove his last wicket, that of Willie Quaife; in his very last match, against Gloucestershire, he bowled not a ball.

He became a clergyman and was from 1955 to 1960 the vicar of Walton-on-Thames, Surrey. He died at the age of 63 in Ewhurst, Surrey.
