= Van den Bergh (crater) =

Crater on the Moon

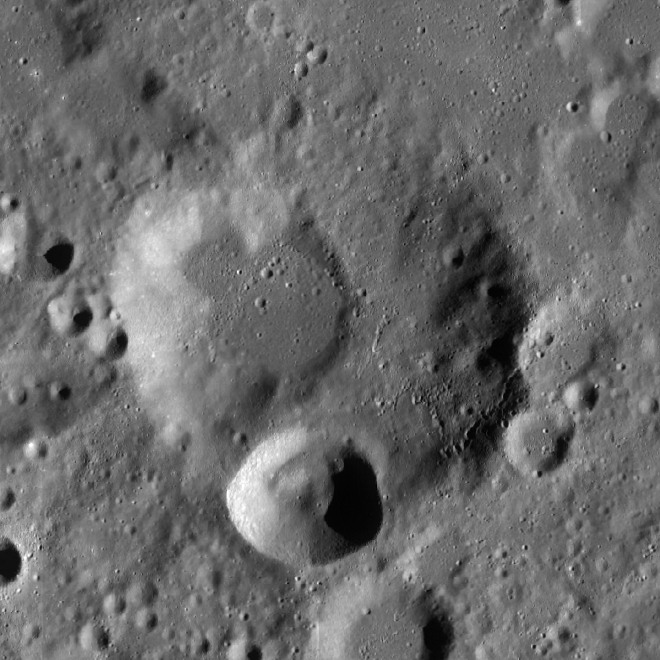
- LRO mosaic
- Coordinates: 31.3°N 159.1°W
- Diameter: 42 km
- Depth: Unknown
- Colongitude: 160° at sunrise
- Eponym: George van den Bergh

Van den Bergh is an eroded lunar impact crater that is located on the far side of the Moon. It lies just to the east of the larger crater Cockcroft. To the north is Evershed.

Since its formation, this crater has been heavily worn by subsequent impacts until its features have become softened and rounded. The satellite crater Van den Bergh M lies across the southern rim, and there is a depression from an old impact in the northwestern part of the interior floor. Several small craterlets lie along the rim to the east and west. This crater lies within the path of the ray system from the crater Jackson to the south-southwest.

The Van den Bergh crater is named after George van den Bergh, a prominent Dutch law professor and amateur astronomer.

== Satellite craters ==
By convention these features are identified on lunar maps by placing the letter on the side of the crater midpoint that is closest to Van den Bergh.

| Van den Bergh | Latitude | Longitude | Diameter |
|---|---|---|---|
| F | 31.0° N | 155.0° W | 29 km |
| M | 30.7° N | 159.2° W | 15 km |
| P | 29.5° N | 160.1° W | 15 km |
| Y | 33.1° N | 159.7° W | 43 km |
