= Kavasji Naegamvala =

Astrophysicist and director of Takhtasingji Observatory

- Education: Elphinstone College

Kavasji Naegamvala, also known as Kavasji Dadabhai Naegamvala (1857-1938) (FRAS) was an astrophysicist and the director of the Takhtasingji Observatory.

== Education ==
Naegamvala received his BA from Elphinstone College, Bombay; he received his MA in physics and chemistry in 1878. He was awarded the chancellor's gold medal, the highest honor of Bombay University. He joined Elphinstone College as lecturer in experimental physics, in 1882. He was elected Fellow of the Royal Astronomical Society (FRAS), in 1885; and in 1888, he joined the College of Science, Pune, College of Engineering, as professor of astrophysics.

== Contributions to astrophysics ==
Naegamvala's work included observations of nebulae, solar flash spectrum, and the transit of Mercury on 9 May 1891. He joined the British Astronomical Association expedition to Norway, in 1896, to observe a total solar eclipse. His independently organised, and conducted, expedition to Jeur, in western India, to observe the solar chromosphere and corona, during the 1898 eclipse, broke a psychological barrier to the entry of Indian scientists to the study of astronomy. His observations were published in several scientific journals; one paper in The Astrophysical Journal, five in Monthly Notices of the Royal Astronomical Society, and two in The Observatory.

His spectroscopic observations of the Orion Nebula, using several spectroscopes and the 16 1/2-inch Grubb telescope at several magnifications, showed that its green nebular line is sharp, symmetrical, and narrow, and not "fluted", thus refuting Norman Lockyer's "meteoric hypothesis" of the nebulae, according to which the spectrographic lines arise from the collisional heat of the meteoric particles, and require the nebular line to be fluted (extended or shaded like molecular bands–the likely molecular band at this wavelength being that of MgO). Before Naegamvala's observations, others—notably Huggins, Vogeland, and James Keeler at Lick—showed the lines to be sharp, but there was still a major controversy. As Osterbrock says,

although Keeler’s paper convinced most of his contemporaries, Lockyer and his partisans could not accept the result, and at a meeting of the Royal Astronomical Society on 8 May 1891, with neither Huggins nor Lockyer present, an argument welled up. It began with the reading of a paper from K.D. Naegamvala of Poonah, India, who had been observing the Orion nebula with his 16½-inch telescope and three prism spectroscope and found that the chief nebular line was sharp under all circumstances, and therefore not the remnant of magnesium fluting, as Lockyer had suggested. Captain William Noble, a friend and partisan of Huggins, rose and smoothly congratulated Naegamvala, through the Secretary who had read the paper.

Noble is supposed to have said,

The theory (meteoric)... has been already three times killed by Dr Huggins in England, Dr Vogel in Germany and Professor Keeler at Lick observatory, and I think that we must look on Mr Naegamvala as having finally killed and buried it.

The six-inch refracting telescope, from Lerebours and Secretan, of 1850, was remodelled and installed for daily photographs of the Sun and is still being used (one of the oldest telescopes still in use) sent by Greenwich on permanent loan to the photoheliograph. These observations produced plots showing that the shape of the Sun's corona, with respect to sun spot numbers over the years, varies with the solar cycle. This work of Naegamvala might be considered the highlight of all his astronomical achievements.

== Takhtasingji Observatory ==
In 1882, The Maharaja of Bhavnagar visited Elphinstone College and funded, offering a sum of ₹5,000 (US$52) and hoping for a matching grant by Bombay Government, the Maharaja Takhtasingji Observatory, in Pune, which Naegamvala helped develop; in 1900, becoming director. The observatory's twenty-inch Grubb telescope remained the largest in India for eight decades to come. When Naegamvala retired in 1912, the observatory was shut down, with all equipment being transferred to the Kodaikanal Solar Observatory.
