= Harutaro Murakami =

Japanese physicist and astronomer

Harutaro Murakami (村上 春太郎, Murakami Harutarō) (1872–1947) was a Japanese physicist and astronomer. He is the father of the astronomer Tadayoshi Murakami (1907–1985). The crater Murakami on the Moon is named after him.
