= Mariotte (crater) =

Crater on the Moon

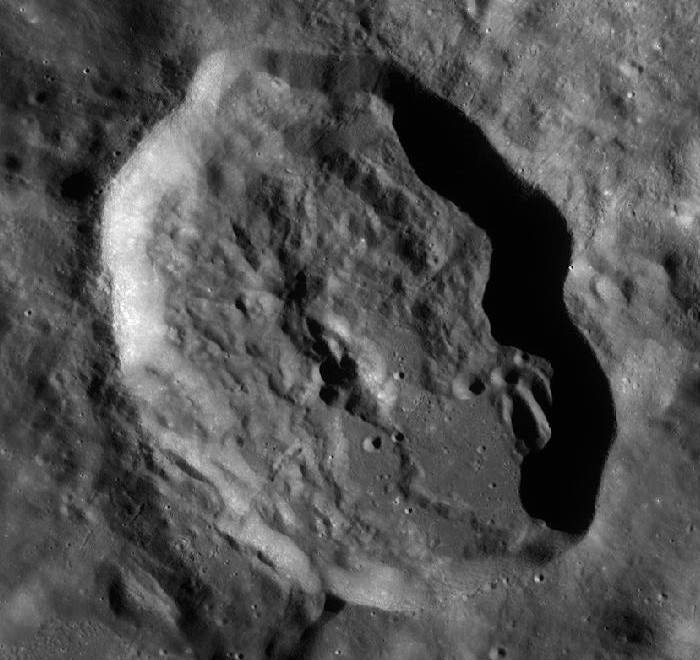
- LRO WAC image
- Coordinates: 28.5°S 139.1°W
- Diameter: 65 km
- Depth: Unknown
- Colongitude: 140° at sunrise
- Eponym: Edme Mariotte

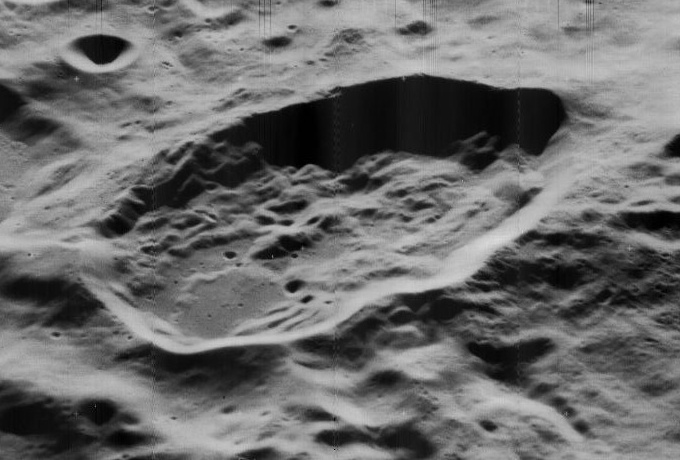
Oblique Lunar Orbiter 5 image

Mariotte is an elongated crater that is located on the far side of the Moon, named after the physicist Edme Mariotte. This formation is located about one crater diameter to the southwest of the smaller Das. This crater is longer to the southeast by about an extra 5 km, giving this feature an egg-shaped outline. The outer rim is sharp-edged and little eroded. The interior floor is uneven, particularly toward the southeastern end. To the southeast of Mariotte is the large crater Chebyshev.

== Satellite craters ==
By convention these features are identified on lunar maps by placing the letter on the side of the crater midpoint that is closest to Mariotte.

| Mariotte | Latitude | Longitude | Diameter |
|---|---|---|---|
| P | 29.9° S | 139.7° W | 30 km |
| R | 30.1° S | 141.6° W | 33 km |
| U | 27.9° S | 142.8° W | 34 km |
| X | 25.3° S | 140.0° W | 20 km |
| Z | 22.9° S | 139.0° W | 47 km |

The following craters have been renamed by the IAU:

- Mariotte Y — See Murakami.
