= List of 64 Zoo Lane episodes =

This is a list of the episodes of the animated children's television programme 64 Zoo Lane.

== Series overview ==
| Season | Episodes | Originally released | |
| Season | Episodes | First released | Last released |
|---|---|---|---|
| Pilot | | April 13, 1994 | |
| 1 | 26 | September 6, 1999 (US/Canada) | December 28, 1999 (Germany) |
| 2 | 26 | July 8, 2001 (Germany) | January 6, 2002 (Germany) |
| 3 | 26 | February 6, 2010 | March 3, 2010 |
| 4 | 26 | October 28, 2012 | February 28, 2013 |

== Episodes ==
=== Pilot (1994) ===
| Title | Original release date |
|---|---|
| "64 Zoo Lane" | 13 April 1994 |

=== Series 1 (1999) ===
| No. overall | No. in series | Title | Original release date |
|---|---|---|---|
| 1 | 1 | "The Story of Nelson the Elephant" | 6 September 1999 (US/Canada); 23 November 1999 (Germany); 3 April 2000 (UK); 9 September 2000 (France) |
Georgina tells about the time when a young Nelson developed a jumping hobby which disturbed Reginald, Audrey and Nathalie.
| 2 | 2 | "The Story of Kevin the Crocodile" | 24 November 1999 (Germany); 10 April 2000 (UK) |
Victor the Crocodile tells Lucy about the time he tried to get Kevin to be like him.
| 3 | 3 | "The Story of Joey the Kangaroo" | 25 November 1999 (Germany); 17 April 2000 (UK) |
Ribbit the Frog tells Lucy about the time he had to teach Joey how to jump.
| 4 | 4 | "The Story of Snowbert the Polar Bear" | 26 November 1999 (Germany); 3 May 2001 (UK) |
Boris tells about his cousin Snowbert who lived alone. He has to meet Sidney the Seal in his fishing hole.
| 5 | 5 | "The Story of Henrietta the Hairy Hippo" | 29 November 1999 (Germany); 8 May 2000 (UK) |
Molly tells about her cousin Henrietta who ran away from the river because the other hippos made fun of her very long hair.
| 6 | 6 | "The Story of Giggles and Tickles" | 30 November 1999 (Germany); 15 May 2000 (UK) |
Giggles and Tickles tell about the time they played tricks on the other animals, but they couldn't stop monkeying around and they lost their laughs.
| 7 | 7 | "The Story of Zed the Zebra" | 1 December 1999 (Germany); 22 May 2000 (UK) |
Snip Snip Bird tells Lucy about the time Zed wanted to win the races against the other animals of Africa.
| 8 | 8 | "The Story of Adam the Armadillo" | 2 December 1999 (Germany); 5 June 2000 (UK) |
Adam the Armadillo tells Lucy about the time he tried working to fit in with Jazz, Leopoldo, and Dudley.
| 9 | 9 | "The Story of Georgina the Giraffe" | 3 December 1999 (Germany); 12 June 2000 (UK) |
Georgina tells about the time she showed off her neck tricks and got her neck tangled up. Giggles and Tickles turn to Doctor Gordon Gorilla for help.
| 10 | 10 | "The Story of Herbert the Warthog" | 6 December 1999 (Germany); 19 June 2000 (UK) |
Herbert the Warthog tells Lucy about the time he worked with Zed and Alan to make music, which annoyed Reginald the grumpy lion, who was trying to get some sleep.
| 11 | 11 | "The Story of Pauline the Pelican" | 7 December 1999 (Germany); 9 May 2001 (UK) |
Molly tells about the time Pauline the Pelican was so hungry that she stole food from Herbert, Seamus, and Reginald and didn't share.
| 12 | 12 | "The Story of the Juicy Fruit Tree" | 8 December 1999 (Germany); 10 July 2000 (UK) |
Georgina tells Lucy about the Juicy Fruit Tree, which produces the Juicy Fruit every seven years. Nelson, Audrey, Ronald, Zed, Toby, Giggles and Tickles work together to get the Juicy Fruit down before sunset.
| 13 | 13 | "The Story of the Elephant Bird" | 9 December 1999 (Germany); 17 July 2000 (UK) |
Molly tells about the time Nelson wanted to be like William the Weaver Bird.
| 14 | 14 | "The Story of Toby the Tortoise" | 10 December 1999 (Germany); 24 July 2000 (UK) |
Nelson tells about the time Toby the Tortoise was scared by a thunderstorm and his friends had to cure him of his fear.
| 15 | 15 | "The Story of Audrey's Egg" | 13 December 1999 (Germany); 7 August 2000 (UK) |
Nelson tells about the time Audrey the Ostrich sat on her egg without taking any breaks.
| 16 | 16 | "The Story of Gary the Dromedary" | 14 December 1999 (Germany); 14 August 2000 (UK) |
Dennis the Dromedary tells Lucy about the time Gary was a very curious dromedary and asked lots of questions.
| 17 | 17 | "The Story of Molly and Nathalie" | 15 December 1999 (Germany); 21 August 2000 (UK) |
Georgina tells about the time Nathalie the Antelope tried to teach Molly the Hippo to dance.
| 18 | 18 | "The Story of Wally the Wombat" | 16 December 1999 (Germany); 31 January 2002 (UK) |
Boris tells about the time Wally the Wombat made all the water dry up, which was a problem for Joey, Jimmy and Phoebe.
| 19 | 19 | "The Story of the Jungle Clearing" | 17 December 1999 (Germany); 25 April 2001 (UK) |
Georgina tells about the time the Jungle Clearing was an awful mess, so Nelson, Georgina, Nathalie, Herbert, and Zed had to clean up without Giggles and Tickles' help.
| 20 | 20 | "The Story of Melanie the Moose" | 20 December 1999 (Germany); 1 February 2002 (UK) |
Boris tells about the time Melanie's clumsiness and size caused problems for him, Beverly and Randolph. It soon comes in handy, though, when Melanie ends up having to find them buried in the snow.
| 21 | 21 | "The Story of Ronald and the Tic Tic Bird" | 21 December 1999 (Germany); 31 July 2000 (UK) |
When Lucy visits her nest, Audrey the Ostrich tells Lucy about the time Ronald and the Tic Tic Bird broke up and she had to get them back together.
| 22 | 22 | "The Story of Beverly the Beaver" | 22 December 1999 (Germany); 26 April 2001 (UK) |
Boris tells about the time Beverly tried to perfect her dam but went overboard.
| 23 | 23 | "The Story of Doris the Duck" | 23 December 1999 (Germany); 27 April 2001 (UK) |
Molly tells about the time Doris wanted to be a princess but was lonely without Toby and Kevin.
| 24 | 24 | "The Story of Esmeralda the Snake" | 24 December 1999 (Germany); 30 April 2001 (UK) |
Giggles and Tickles tell about the time Esmeralda the Snake was a housekeeper and Herbert wouldn't clean up.
| 25 | 25 | "The Story of Eddie's Big Adventure" | 27 December 1999 (Germany); 1 May 2001 (UK) |
Georgina tells about the time Eddie the Hippo went to see his aunt Molly but got himself into trouble.
| 26 | 26 | "The Story of Herbert's Birthday Party" | 28 December 1999 (Germany); 2 May 2001 (UK) |
Nelson tells about the time Herbert had a birthday party, but the other animals didn't know where he was.

=== Series 2 (2001–2002) ===
- Note 1: This is the last season to use hand-drawn and digitally-colored animation.
- Note 2: This is the last season to be dubbed in American English by Lobster Films.

| No. overall | No. in series | Title | Original release date |
|---|---|---|---|
| 27 | 1 | "The Story of Reginald's Big Sleep" | 8 July 2001 (Germany); 4 September 2002 (UK) |
Georgina tells about the time Reginald the Lion was trying to get some sleep in the very long grass, but he is upset by other animals making noise. He decides to keep his resting place secure so no one can make noise.
| 28 | 2 | "The Story of Phoebe the Koala" | 22 July 2001 (Germany) |
Molly tells about the time Phoebe was feeling very bored and wanted to play but every time she participated in Joey's competitions, she never won any of them. So Wally wanted to help make a print into the rock.
| 29 | 3 | "The Story of Hercule Mustache" | 29 July 2001 (Germany) |
Snowbert the Polar Bear joins his cousin Boris and tells about the time he and Sidney met Hercule Mustache the Walrus.
| 30 | 4 | "The Story of the Dawn Chorus" | 15 July 2001 (Germany) |
Molly tells about the time Doris the Duck didn't like the noises of all the animals of Africa so she wrote a new song.
| 31 | 5 | "The Story of Petula the Parrot" | 2 December 2001 (Germany) |
Giggles and Tickles tell about the time Petula the Parrot gathered food for her friends' party but Giggles and Tickles ate all the food.
| 32 | 6 | "The Story of Kevin's Magic Trick" | 5 August 2001 (Germany) |
Nelson tells about the time Kevin the Crocodile was very shy until he did a magic trick to make it rain.
| 33 | 7 | "The Story of Isabel the Flamingo" | 12 August 2001 (Germany) |
Georgina tells about the time Pauline the Pelican wanted to be like Isabel the Flamingo.
| 34 | 8 | "The Story of Herbert and the Watermelon of Doom" | 19 August 2001 (Germany) |
Victor the Crocodile tells Lucy about the time Herbert the Warthog tried to tell Victor about a giant watermelon at Table Mountain.
| 35 | 9 | "The Story of Alan the Aardvark" | 26 August 2001 (Germany) |
Nelson tells about the time Alan the Aardvark was not eating very well because he was too busy listening to his tunes.
| 36 | 10 | "The Story of the Important Visitor" | 2 September 2001 (Germany) |
Molly tells about the time Reginald the Lion was visited by Cleopatra, who turns out to be Patsy the Porcupine.
| 37 | 11 | "The Story of the Puffins of Mossy Bay" | 9 September 2001 (Germany) |
Nelson tells about the time Hercule Mustache the Walrus was coach to the Puffins, who played soccer ball with the Crabs.
| 38 | 12 | "The Story of Ronald and Rosie" | 16 September 2001 (Germany) |
Georgina tells about the time Ronald the Rhino and the Tic Tic Bird saw a female Rhino named Rosie and a female Tic Tic Bird and Ronald was very shy but Audrey the Ostrich had an idea.
| 39 | 13 | "The Story of Nathalie's New Neighbors" | 23 September 2001 (Germany) |
Nelson tells about the time Nathalie the Antelope was annoyed by her noisy neighbor Herbert the Warthog, so Harry the Hyena and his family become her new neighbors, but they are even noisier than Herbert.
| 40 | 14 | "The Story of Casper the Chameleon" | 30 September 2001 (Germany) |
Casper the Chameleon tells Lucy about the time he finally learned how to change colors and started playing tricks to the other animals. Casper caught Toby and they got trapped in a log, but then Seamus the Stork came to rescue them.
| 41 | 15 | "The Story of Seamus the Stork" | 7 October 2001 (Germany) |
Molly tells about the time Seamus the Stork lost his feathers and couldn't fly.
| 42 | 16 | "The Story of Gary's Best Friend" | 14 October 2001 (Germany) |
Nelson tells about the time Gary the Dromedary tried many ways to befriend Zed the Zebra.
| 43 | 17 | "The Story of Georgina's Bumbleberry Soup" | 21 October 2001 (Germany) |
Molly tells about the time Georgina the Giraffe tried to make Bumbleberry soup.
| 44 | 18 | "The Story of Cousin Chuckles" | 28 October 2001 (Germany) |
Giggles and Tickles tell about the time Cousin Chuckles, who couldn't laugh, spoiled their tricks.
| 45 | 19 | "The Story of Joey's Camping Trip" | 4 November 2001 (Germany) |
Mr. Platypus tells Lucy about the time Joey the Kangaroo wanted to go camping but his mother made endless trips back and forth trying to help him.
| 46 | 20 | "The Story of the Monster in the Forest" | 11 November 2001 (Germany) |
Nelson tells a story about the time Jazz, Leopoldo and Taco teased Adam about being scared of monsters until they encounter Annie the Anaconda.
| 47 | 21 | "The Story of Boris the Bear" | 18 November 2001 (Germany) |
Georgina tells a story Boris once told her about the time he couldn't find his honey comb and enlisted his friends to help him find it.
| 48 | 22 | "The Story of Melanie's Birthday Present" | 25 November 2001 (Germany) |
Boris tells about the time Melanie the Moose wanted a snowboard for her birthday.
| 49 | 23 | "The Story of Victor the Crocodile" | 16 December 2001 (Germany) |
Georgina tells about the time Victor the Crocodile scared the animals and the water hole dried up.
| 50 | 24 | "The Story of the Hyenas' Holiday" | 23 December 2001 (Germany) |
Nelson tells about the time Harry the Hyena and his family went on their Hyena Holiday.
| 51 | 25 | "The Story of Herbert's Peaceful Day" | 21 October 2003 |
Molly tells about the time Herbert the Warthog tried to stay silent in order to win the biggest, juiciest watermelon in all of Africa.
| 52 | 26 | "The Story of Annie the Anaconda" | 6 January 2002 (Germany) |
Annie the Anaconda tells Lucy about the time she and Adam helped Jazz the Jaguar, Leopoldo the Llama and Taco the Toucan find a treasure chest.

=== Series 3 (2010) ===
- Note: This is the first season to be animated with Adobe Flash software.

| No. overall | No. in series | Title | Written by | Original release date |
|---|---|---|---|---|
| 53 | 1 | "The Story of Nelson's Nephew Nigel" | John Grace | 6 February 2010 |
Nelson tells about the time he babysat his naughty nephew Nigel.
| 54 | 2 | "The Story of Georgina, Queen of Fashion" | John Grace | 7 February 2010 |
Molly tells about the time Georgina the Giraffe became Queen of Fashion with her fancy hat. However, she realises the craze causes chaos because there isn't enough room for everybody.
| 55 | 3 | "The Story of Lily's Little Brother" | Keith Brumpton | 8 February 2010 |
Georgina tells about the time Lily the Ostrich showed her mother Audrey to her new brother inside of his egg.
| 56 | 4 | "The Story of the Big Billabong Wave" | Keith Brumpton | 9 February 2010 |
Carrie the Cockatoo tells Lucy about the time Joey the kangaroo and his friends were hot, so Carrie and Wally the Wombat created a Big Billabong Wave.
| 57 | 5 | "The Story of Toby's New House" | Gillian Corderoy | 10 February 2010 |
Nelson tells about the time Toby the Tortoise and his friends found a new home.
| 58 | 6 | "The Story of Jamie the Littlest Puffin" | An Vrombaut | 11 February 2010 |
The Puffins of Mossy Bay tell Lucy about the time Jamie couldn't stop sucking his feather, so Thomas, Sharon, and Lewis tried to get him to break the habit. Mister Mustache also tries to get him to break the habit.
| 59 | 7 | "The Story of Ronald's Swimming Lesson" | An Vrombaut | 12 February 2010 |
Nelson tells about the time the animals went to find a rainbow fruit, but Ronald the Rhino couldn't swim, so they gave him a swimming lesson.
| 60 | 8 | "The Story of the Puffins' Treasure" | Keith Brumpton | 13 February 2010 |
Gunner the Sea Gull tells Lucy about the time the Puffins lost their ball and didn't know how to get it back.
| 61 | 9 | "The Story of Victor's Bad Teeth Day" | An Vrombaut | 14 February 2010 |
Molly tells about the time Victor the Crocodile was grumpy because his teeth were all yucky and dirty.
| 62 | 10 | "The Story of Snowbert's New Friend" | Keith Brumpton | 15 February 2010 |
Sidney the Seal tells Lucy about the time he and his friend Snowbert the Polar Bear had an argument and temporarily ended their friendship. Snowbert builds himself a new friend out of snow, but soon realises that a friend that agrees with you the whole time is not as much fun as one that doesn't. Snowbert and Sidney miss each other, so one day Thelma the Whale comes by to help them restore their friendship.
| 63 | 11 | "The Story of the Play and Splash Pool" | Gillian Corderoy | 16 February 2010 |
Wally the Wombat tells Lucy about the time Joey and his friends got a new Play and Splash Pool.
| 64 | 12 | "The Story of Melanie's Little Helpers" | Gillian Corderoy | 17 February 2010 |
Boris tells about the time Melanie the Moose had trouble turning corners with her snowboard. Randolph the Raccoon and Alfie and Charlie the Chipmunks help her learn to turn and they come up with an ingenious plan.
| 65 | 13 | "The Story of Joey's Sleepover" | Keith Brumpton & An Vrombaut | 18 February 2010 |
Ribbit the Frog tells Lucy about the time Joey and his father gave a birthday present to his mother and Joey had a sleepover with his friend Phoebe the Koala.
| 66 | 14 | "The Story of the Jungle Pie" | An Vrombaut | 19 February 2010 |
Georgina tells about the time Kevin was a picky eater until he tried some Jungle Pie made of worms, berries, and carrots.
| 67 | 15 | "The Story of Jazz the Carnival King" | Gillian Corderoy | 20 February 2010 |
Adam tells Lucy about the time Jazz the Jaguar couldn't dance for the Carnival King.
| 68 | 16 | "The Story of Patsy the Porcupine" | An Vrombaut | 21 February 2010 |
Nelson tells about the time Patsy the Porcupine worked so hard that she hurt her legs and broke her quills.
| 69 | 17 | "The Story of the Together Stones" | An Vrombaut | 22 February 2010 |
Carrie the Cockatoo tells Lucy about the time Joey and his friends tried to find out the mystery of the Together Stones.
| 70 | 18 | "The Story of Thelma the Whale" | Gillian Corderoy | 23 February 2010 |
Gunner the Sea Gull tells Lucy about the time no one wanted to play with Thelma the Whale because she kept crashing into the beach.
| 71 | 19 | "The Story of the Best Christmas Tree Ever" | Keith Brumpton | 24 December 2010 |
Boris tells about the time he and his friends found a Christmas tree, but they got upset when Melanie the Moose gave the tree to the Bison family.
| 72 | 20 | "The Story of Alan's Catchy Tune" | Keith Brumpton | 25 February 2010 |
Georgina tells about the time Alan the Aardvark forgot his catchy tune, which worried Zed the Zebra and Herbert the Warthog.
| 73 | 21 | "The Story of the Baby Bison" | An Vrombaut | 26 February 2010 |
Boris tells about the time Alfie and Charlie the Chipmunks helped a lost baby bison named Barbara find her way home.
| 74 | 22 | "The Story of Zed the Hero of Africa" | Keith Brumpton & An Vrombaut | 27 February 2010 |
Nelson tells about the time Zed the Zebra stopped a volcano from erupting and became a hero.
| 75 | 23 | "The Story of Herbert's Watermelons" | Gillian Corderoy | 28 February 2010 |
Nelson tells about the time he and his nephew Nigel went to see Herbert the Warthog, and Nigel was put in charge of the Precious Watermelons on ripening day.
| 76 | 24 | "The Story of Doris' Precious Things" | Gillian Corderoy | 1 March 2010 |
Molly tells about the time Doris the Duck was collecting interesting things, but she upset the other animals by taking their things.
| 77 | 25 | "The Story of Leopoldo the Llama" | Keith Brumpton | 2 March 2010 |
Tallulah the Toucan tells Lucy about the time Leopoldo the Llama tried to prove he was the best climber in the world.
| 78 | 26 | "The Story of Tallulah the Toucan" | An Vrombaut | 3 March 2010 |
Leopoldo the Llama tells Lucy about the time Tallulah the Toucan lost her flowers and Adam, Jazz, Leopoldo tried to cheer her up.

=== Series 4 (2012–13) ===
| No. overall | No. in series | Title | Original release date |
|---|---|---|---|
| 79 | 1 | "The Story of Zed's Really Helpful Mood" | 28 October 2012 |
Nelson tells about the time Zed the Zebra was in the mood to help the animals.
| 80 | 2 | "The Story of the Flamingo Festival" | 29 October 2012 |
Molly tells about the time Isabel the Flamingo was getting ready for the Flamingo Festival but she hurt her wing, so Pauline the Pelican filled in for her at the festival.
| 81 | 3 | "The Story of the Jimjameree Tree" | 30 October 2012 |
Carrie the Cockatoo tells Lucy about the time lightning struck the Jimjameree Tree, and Joey and Jimmy missed the tree.
| 82 | 4 | "The Story of Alfie and Charlie's Canoe" | 31 October 2012 |
Boris tells about the time Alfie and Charlie the Chipmunks went on a canoe ride with Randolph the Raccoon.
| 83 | 5 | "The Story of the Whale Trip" | 1 November 2012 |
Gunner the Sea Gull tells Lucy about the time Thelma the Whale and Hercule Mustache took the puffins on a trip to the open ocean.
| 84 | 6 | "The Story of Horace the Hare" | 4 November 2012 |
Cassandra the Crane tells Lucy about the time Bao Bao the Panda tried to hug Horace the Hare, but Horace runs away because nobody has ever given him a hug before.
| 85 | 7 | "The Story of the Boomerangball Game" | 5 November 2012 |
Wally the Wombat tells Lucy about the time Joey and Jimmy couldn't go back to the Boomerangball game after their mothers have a falling out, but Carrie the Cockatoo had an idea.
| 86 | 8 | "The Story of the End of the Rainy Season Clean" | 6 November 2012 |
Nelson tells about the time Herbert the Warthog didn't clean up the mess at the end of the rainy season.
| 87 | 9 | "The Story of a Long Night in the Jungle" | 7 November 2012 |
Nelson tells about the time Giggles and Tickles stayed up all night before their birthday party.
| 88 | 10 | "The Story of the Record-Breaking Puffins" | 8 November 2012 |
Gunner the Sea Gull tells Lucy about the time the puffins tried to break a record.
| 89 | 11 | "The Story of the Merry Jinglewhizz" | 20 December 2012 |
Boris tells about the time he and his friends were disappointed that there was no snow on Christmas, and Jinglewhizz and Barbara the Baby Bison did a snow dance.
| 90 | 12 | "The Story of the Cooking Contest" | 10 February 2013 |
Cassandra the Crane tells Lucy about the time Bao Bao the Panda and Horace the Hare didn't know who won the cooking contest.
| 91 | 13 | "The Story of the House of Leaves" | 11 February 2013 |
Georgina tells about the time Nelson the Elephant and his nephew Nigel built a house of leaves.
| 92 | 14 | "The Story of Ronald and His Boulders" | 12 February 2013 |
Georgina tells about the time Ronald the Rhino and his friend Tic Tic Bird tried out his Bashing Boulders and Ronald tried to get everyone to help.
| 93 | 15 | "The Story of the Savannah Craze" | 13 February 2013 |
Molly tells about the time Doris the Duck invented a new game called Savannah Craze.
| 94 | 16 | "The Story of the Great Rains" | 14 February 2013 |
Nelson tells about the time the monkeys were assigned to look out for rain, but they started making false predictions instead.
| 95 | 17 | "The Story of the Jungle Ball" | 17 February 2013 |
Molly tells about the time Reginald the Lion needed a dance partner, so Nathalie the Antelope dances with him.
| 96 | 18 | "The Story of Alan's Scooter" | 18 February 2013 |
Georgina tells about the time Alan the Aardvark wanted Nelson the Elephant to build a scooter.
| 97 | 19 | "The Story of Bao Bao's Long Goodbye" | 19 February 2013 |
Horace the Hare tells Lucy about the time Bao Bao the Panda was having fun with Cassandra the Crane and was very upset that Cassandra had to leave.
| 98 | 20 | "The Story of Reginald's New Look" | 20 February 2013 |
Georgina tells about the time Nathalie the Antelope gave Reginald the Lion a makeover.
| 99 | 21 | "The Story of Confuse-us the Carp" | 21 February 2013 |
Bao Bao the Panda tells Lucy about the time he and Horace discovered some strange things in the mountains and Confuse-us the Carp had a plan.
| 100 | 22 | "The Story of the Last Buluru Berry" | 24 February 2013 |
Phoebe the Koala tells Lucy about the time she and her friends tried save the last Buluru berry.
| 101 | 23 | "The Story of Washi-Washi Day" | 25 February 2013 |
Cassandra the Crane tells Lucy about the time Horace the Hare didn't want to join the Washi-Washi day.
| 102 | 24 | "The Story of Doris' Flower" | 26 February 2013 |
Georgina tells about the time Doris the Duck tried to save her flower.
| 103 | 25 | "The Story of Gertie the Goat" | 27 February 2013 |
Gertie the Goat tells Lucy about the time she took Bao Bao the Panda on a climbing adventure.
| 104 | 26 | "The Story of Tallulah's Surprise Present" | 28 February 2013 |
Leopoldo the Llama tells Lucy about the time Tallulah the Toucan received a surprise present for Leopoldo, Adam, and Jazz.
