= Anil Kumar Das =

Indian astronomer (1902–1961)

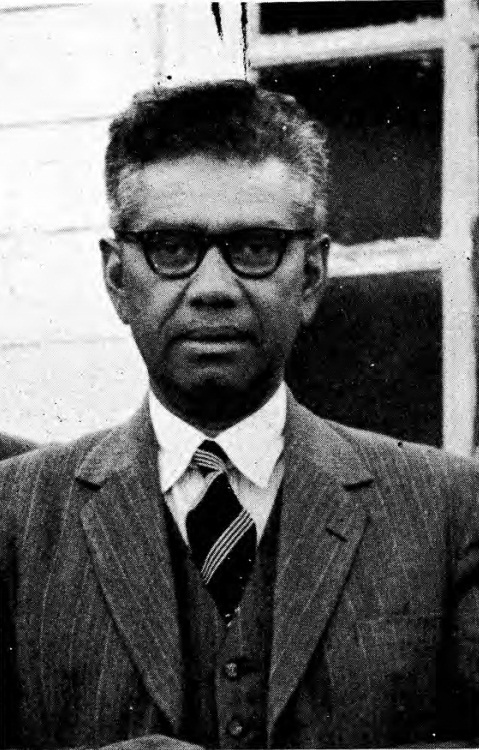
- Prof. Anil Kumar Das
- Born: 1 February 1902; Chinsura, Hooghly, West Bengal, India
- Died: 18 February 1961 (aged 59); Hyderabad, India
- Education: Chuadanga High School; Berhampore College; Presidency College; University of Calcutta; University of Paris; Laboratoire de Physique des Solides, Paris, (1925-26)
- Known for: helioseismology investigations
- Awards: Fellow of Royal Astronomical Society, 1935; Fellow of the National Institute of Science, now known as Indian National Science Academy, 1943; Padma Shri, (1960); Das (crater) by IAU
- Scientific career
- Fields: Physics; Astronomy; Solar physics
- Workplaces: Laboratoire de Physique des Solides, Paris; Institut für theoretische physik, Göttingen; Geophysikalisches Institut, Göttingen; Solar Physics Observatory, Cambridge, 1934; Indian Meteorological Service, (1930 - 1937); Upper Air Observatory, Agra; Assistant director of Kodaikanal Solar Observatory, (1937 - 1946); Director of Kodaikanal Solar Observatory, (1946 - 1960); Professor of astronomy in Osmania University, 1961; Director of the Nizamia Observatory, Hyderabad, 1961
- Academic advisors: Prasanta Chandra Mahalanobis; Charu Chandra Bhattacharya; Snehamoy Dutta

Anil Kumar Das FRAS, FNI (1 February 1902 - 18 February 1961) was an Indian scientist, astronomer. During the International Geophysical Year, observatories in Madrid, India, and Manila were responsible for monitoring solar effects. The Kodaikanal Solar Observatory in South India performed this monitoring using their recently built solar tunnel telescope. Das was the director of the Kodaikanal observatory at this time. In 1960 he was responsible for installing a tower/tunnel telescope at the facility that would be used to perform some of the first helioseismology investigations. The crater Das on the far side of the Moon is named after him.

== Biography ==
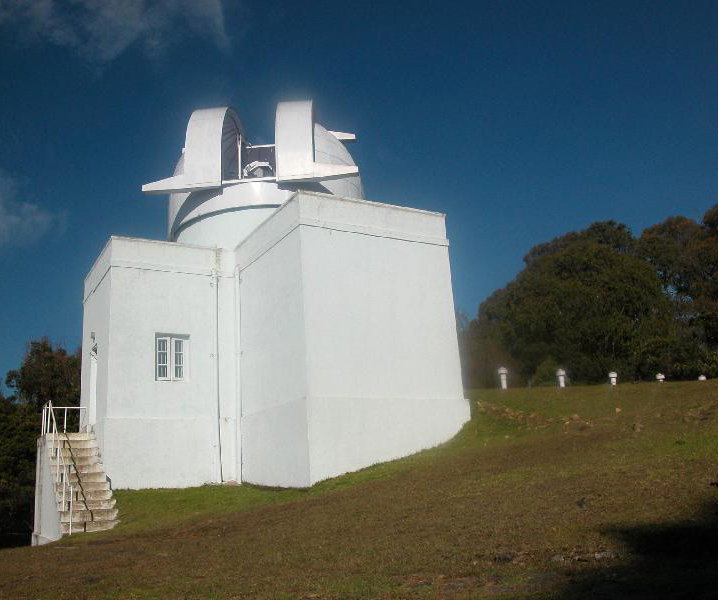
Solar Tunnel Telescope at Kodaikanal

After graduating (Master of Science) from the University of Calcutta, he studied spectroscopy with Charles Fabry at the Sorbonne in Paris. After obtaining his doctorate he was in Göttingen where he worked with Max Born at the Institut für Theoretische Physik and subsequently with Gustav Augenheister at the Geophysikalisches Institut and for a short period at the Solar Physics Observatory in Cambridge. He later worked at the Indian Meteorological Department in 1930 and then moved to the Kodaikanal observatory in 1937 as assistant director and director since 1946 and where he remained until his retirement in 1960.

== Scientific contributions ==
Most of his scientific contributions were in the field of solar physics mainly as an experimenter in the spectrophotometric study of sunspots and the chromosphere. He contributed significantly to the development of the equipment present at the Kodaikanal Observatory and to the growth of numerous young researchers.

== Award and honors ==
- Fellow of the Royal Astronomical Society in 1935
- Fellow of the National Institute of Sciences of India
- The lunar crater Das (crater) dedicated to him by IAU
- Padma Shri by Indian government
