= Hoofdletters, Tweeling- en Meerlingdruk =

Hoofdletters, Tweeling- en Meerlingdruk was a Dutch book published in 1958. In the book, author Dr. George van den Bergh made several propositions for a more economical arrangement of type in books. The book was featured in Herbert Spencer's Typographica (Old Series, number 16, 1959) in and Eye magazine (no. 47, vol. 12, Spring 2003). In Rick Poynor's Typographica he translates the Dutch title as "Capitals, twin- and multi-print."

There were three principles in van den Bergh's proposals. The first was that printing in all caps (Hoofdletters in Dutch means uppercase letters) would save the space wasted by the ascenders and descenders of lowercase letters. The second principle involved double printing texts that could be screened by overlaying sheets that masked every other line of text. The third principle involved double printing texts in red and green: the reader could then read through red or green "spectacles" that filtered out one text.

Erik Kindel, author of the 2003 Eye article sums up with a contemporary evaluation of the book:

Casting a cold eye over Hoofdletters, Tweeling- en Meerlingdruk, it is difficult to see it as anything more than an earnest but bizarre solution to what was undoubtedly a real problem in postwar Europe, and the Netherlands in particular. Most designers, typographers and readers will probably find its technically deterministic contravention of long-established typographic practice merely naïve, resulting in a harmless curiosity that merits little consideration, only incredulity. But if Hoofdletters is designated a practical failure, a typography in extremis, something stops us from dismissing it out of hand. With a warmer eye it resolves into an enlightening object of mirth. While there is no indication that Van den Bergh regarded Hoofdletters with anything but complete seriousness, 45 years on it, too, operates, if accidentally, as an ingenious satire – on the preoccupations of legibility research, or the promise of technology so readily associated with the period of its invention"
