= Evershed (crater) =

Lunar impact crater

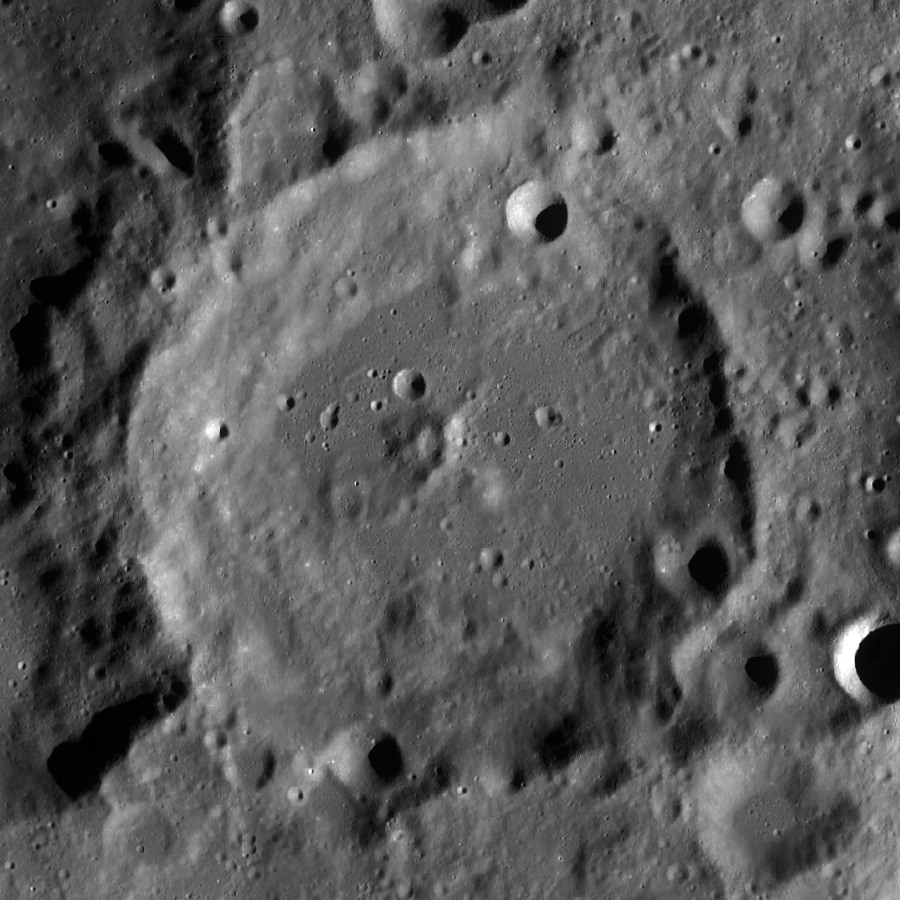
- LRO WAC mosaic
- Coordinates: 35.7°N 159.5°W
- Diameter: 65.28 km (40.56 mi)
- Depth: Unknown
- Colongitude: 160° at sunrise
- Formation: Pre-Nectarian
- Eponym: John Evershed

Evershed is a lunar impact crater on the far side of the Moon. It is located to the northeast of the larger crater Cockcroft, and to the north of the smaller Van den Bergh.

This crater is dated to the Pre-Nectarian period of the lunar geologic timescale. It has a worn outer rim that is somewhat indented and narrower along the eastern side where the formation overlays an older crater. The satellite crater Evershed R is attached to the outer southwest rim. There are small craters along the southern and southeast rim. The interior floor contains an irregular ridge near the midpoint and some rugged terrain in the south, with various tiny craterlets marking the remaining relatively level surface.

This formation is named after the English solar astronomer John Evershed (1864-1956). Its designation was formally adopted by the International Astronomical Union in 1970.

== Satellite craters ==
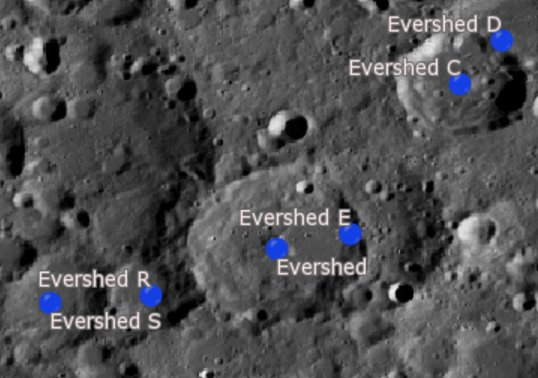
Evershed satellite features and surroundings

By convention these features are identified on lunar maps by placing the letter on the side of the crater midpoint that is closest to Evershed.

Evershed	Latitude	Longitude	Diameter
C	38.1° N	156.7° W	48 km
D	38.8° N	156.0° W	49 km
E	35.9° N	158.3° W	73 km
R	35.1° N	161.2° W	31 km
S	34.9° N	162.6° W	45 km
