= George van den Bergh =

Dutch law professor and astronomer (1890–1966)

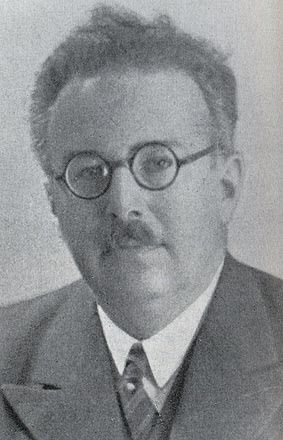
Van den Bergh (ca. 1920)

George van den Bergh (25 April 1890 in Oss – 3 October 1966 in Oegstgeest) was a Dutch law professor and amateur astronomer.

Van den Bergh was the son of Samuel van den Bergh, one of the founders of Unilever. His brother Sidney James and his nephew Maarten would follow his father in business life, while George pursued an academic career. He was a lawyer in Amsterdam, 1915–1936.

From 1925–33 he was a member of the House of Representatives of the Netherlands.

He was author of Aarde en wereld in ruimte en tijd: Een uiteenzetting voor iedereen (1935) which was translated into English in 1937 as The Universe in Space and Time (U.K. edition) and Astronomy for the Millions (U.S. edition).

Etty Hillesum (An Interrupted Life) mentions that he was arrested and detained by the Nazis in 1941. He survived the war.

During the 1950s he studied the longer eclipse cycles, allowing him to predict solar and lunar eclipses over a long time interval. This was published in 1951 as Regelmaat en wisseling bij zonsverduisteringen, met een aanhangsel over maansverduisteringen and translated into English in 1955 as Periodicity and Variation of Solar (and Lunar) Eclipses.

In 1958 he developed a compressed form of typesetting called Hoofdletters, published as Hoofdletters, Tweeling- en Meerlingdruk.

The crater Van den Bergh on the Moon was named after him.
