= An Vrombaut =

An Vrombaut (born June 1967) is a Belgian-born British animator, author and illustrator best known as the creator of the preschool animated television series 64 Zoo Lane and the short film The Tie. She studied animation in Ghent and London, and her work has received recognition at international festivals and industry awards.

== Early life and education ==
Vrombaut was born in Belgium and studied animation at the Royal Academy of Fine Arts (KASK) in Ghent, before completing a postgraduate degree at the Royal College of Art (RCA), London.

== Career ==
=== Television ===
Vrombaut created 64 Zoo Lane, a British–French preschool animated series produced by Millimages and Zoo Lane Productions. The programme originally aired between 1999 and 2003 and later returned between 2010 and 2013, for a total of 104 episodes.

The series was nominated for a BAFTA Children's Award in 2000 and won Best Pre-School Series at the British Animation Awards in 2002 for the episode "Kevin the Crocodile".

In 2012, BBC Worldwide (now BBC Studios) acquired worldwide licensing rights (excluding Francophone territories) to 64 Zoo Lane.

=== Short films ===
Vrombaut's RCA graduation film Little Wolf (1992) won several festival prizes, including at Annecy.

Her 3D short The Tie (2015) premiered in the Berlinale's Generation Kplus section, where it received a Special Mention from the Children's Jury.

The Tie also won the Young Audience Award at the KLIK! Amsterdam Animation Festival.

=== Books ===
Vrombaut has written and illustrated a number of children's picture books. Her crocodile story was published in the UK as Smile, Crocodile, Smile and in the US as Clarabella's Teeth (Clarion Books, 2003). The latter received positive reviews from Publishers Weekly.

== Style and themes ==
Critics have described The Tie as a stylised and affectionate story about giraffes, continuing Vrombaut's animal-centred visual storytelling established in 64 Zoo Lane. Sight & Sound highlighted her "distinctive use of colour and playful emotional economy."

== Recognition ==
- Nominee – BAFTA Children's Award for Pre-School Animation (64 Zoo Lane, 2000)
- Winner – British Animation Awards Best Pre-School Series (64 Zoo Lane: Kevin the Crocodile, 2002)
- Special Mention – Berlinale Generation Kplus (The Tie, 2015)
- Young Audience Award – KLIK! Amsterdam Animation Festival (The Tie, 2015)

== Selected filmography ==
- Little Wolf (1992) – short film
- The Tie (2015) – short film
- 64 Zoo Lane (1999–2013) – creator, writer

== Selected bibliography ==
- Smile, Crocodile, Smile (Oxford University Press)
- Clarabella's Teeth (Clarion Books, 2003) – US edition
