= Kodaikanal Solar Observatory =

Indian observatory

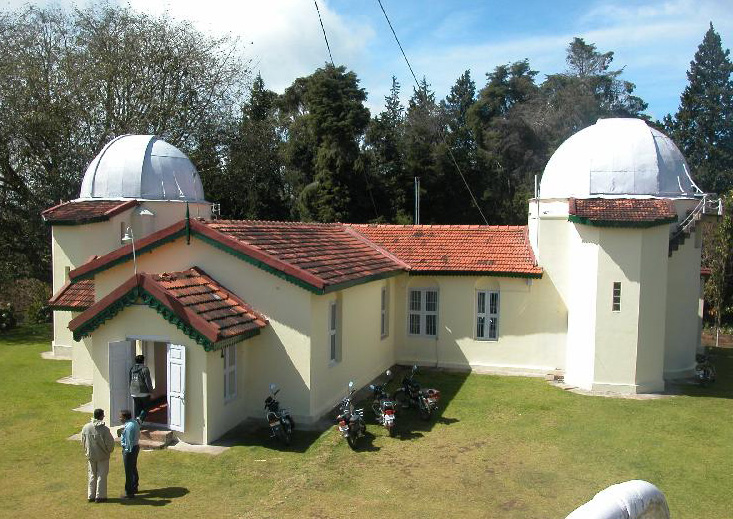
- Kodaikanal Solar Observatory
- Alternative names: Kodaikanal Observatory
- Organization: Indian Institute of Astrophysics
- Location: Kodaikanal, India
- Coordinates: 10°13′56″N 77°27′53″E
- Altitude: 2,343 m (7,687 ft)
- Established: Year 1895 (British – East India Company)
- Website: www.iiap.res.in/centers/kso

Telescopes
- Coelostat: 62 cm reflector – KSO Tunnel Telescope (KTT)
- Grubb-Parsons: Spectro Heliograph (Film – Photograph not available)
- WARM [White Light Active Region Monitoring] Telescope: H-alpha Telescope – 6562.8 A (Lower Chromosphere Telescope)
- TWIN Telescope: SPECTRO – Telescope
- {{{telescope5_name}}}: Radio spectrograph – 35–85 MHz daily operation
- Related media on Commons

The Kodaikanal Solar Observatory is a solar observatory owned and operated by the Indian Institute of Astrophysics. It is on the southern tip of the Palani Hills 4 kilometres (2.5 mi) from Kodaikanal.

The Evershed effect was first detected at this observatory in January 1909. Solar data collected by the lab is the oldest continuous series of its kind in India. Precise observations of the equatorial electrojet are made here due to the unique geography of Kodaikanal.

Ionospheric soundings, geomagnetic, F region vertical drift and surface observations are made here regularly. Summaries of the data obtained are sent to national (India Meteorological Department) and global (World Meteorological Organization, Global Atmosphere Watch) data centers.

They have a full-time staff of two scientists and three technicians.

== History ==
As early as 1881, Mr. Blanford, then Meteorological Reporter to the Government of India, recommended "the improvement of the work of solar observations in order to obtain accurate measures of the sun’s heating power at the earth’s surface and its periodic variations". In May 1882, the government astronomer at Madras, Norman Robert Pogson, proposed the need for photography and spectrography of the sun and the stars using a 20-inch (51 cm) telescope, which could be at a hill station in South India.

On 20 July 1893 following a famine in Madras Presidency, which underscored the need for a study of the sun to better understand monsoon patterns, a meeting of the U.K. Secretary of State, Indian Observatories Committee, chaired by Lord Kelvin, decided to establish a solar physics observatory at Kodaikanal, based on its southern, dust free, high altitude location. Michie Smith was selected to be superintendent. Starting in 1895 there was a rapid transfer of work and equipment from the Madras Observatory to Kodaikanal and the observatory was founded on 1 April 1899.

The first observations were commenced at Kodaikanal in 1901.

Partial List of Assistant Directors

- John Evershed 1906–1911
- Thomas Royds 1911–1923
- Anil Kumar Das 1937–1946

List of Directors

- Charles Michie Smith FRSE 1895–1911
- Charles Pritchard Butler
- John Evershed 1911–1923
- Thomas Royds 1923–1937
- A. L. Narayan 1937–1946
- Anil Kumar Das 1946–1960
- M. K. Vainu Bappu 1960–1982
- J.C.Bhattacharya 1982-1990
- Ramnath Cowsik 1992 - 2003
- S.Siraj Hasan 2006 - 2012
- P.Sreekumar 2013 - 2018
- Annapurni Subramanian 2019–Present

A 12 m (39 ft) solar tower with modern spectrograph was established in 1960 by Amil Kumar Das and used to perform some of the first ever helioseismology investigations. Measurements of vector magnetic fields were initiated during the 1960s.

In 1977, many of the astronomers from Kodaikanal shifted to Bangalore and established the Indian Institute of Astrophysics.

== Current activities ==
Areas of current interest at the observatory are

- Observations and interpretation of the morphological changes in active regions and their role in occurrence of transients such as solar flares.
- Study of contributing factors to chromospheric calcium K indices.
- Measurement of vector magnetic fields.
- Photographs of ~ 117 years are being digitized for long-term studies of the last ten solar cycles, in an effort led by Dipankar Banerjee.
- Studies on the structure and dynamics of the equatorial ionosphere and its response to the solar and interplanetary variability are being carried out.
- Studies of the equatorial electrojet and of the structure and dynamics of the equatorial ionosphere and its response to solar and interplanetary variability are being made.
- Hourly observation of surface temperature, pressure and rainfall are made here and transmitted to the India Meteorological Department and the World Meteorological Organization for use in Weather forecasting and research in the atmospheric sciences.
- Public education about astronomy including tours of the facility, access to the astronomy library, nighttime telescopic sky viewing, and presentation of specialized university-level courses, seminars and workshops.

== Equipment ==
=== Full disc imaging ===
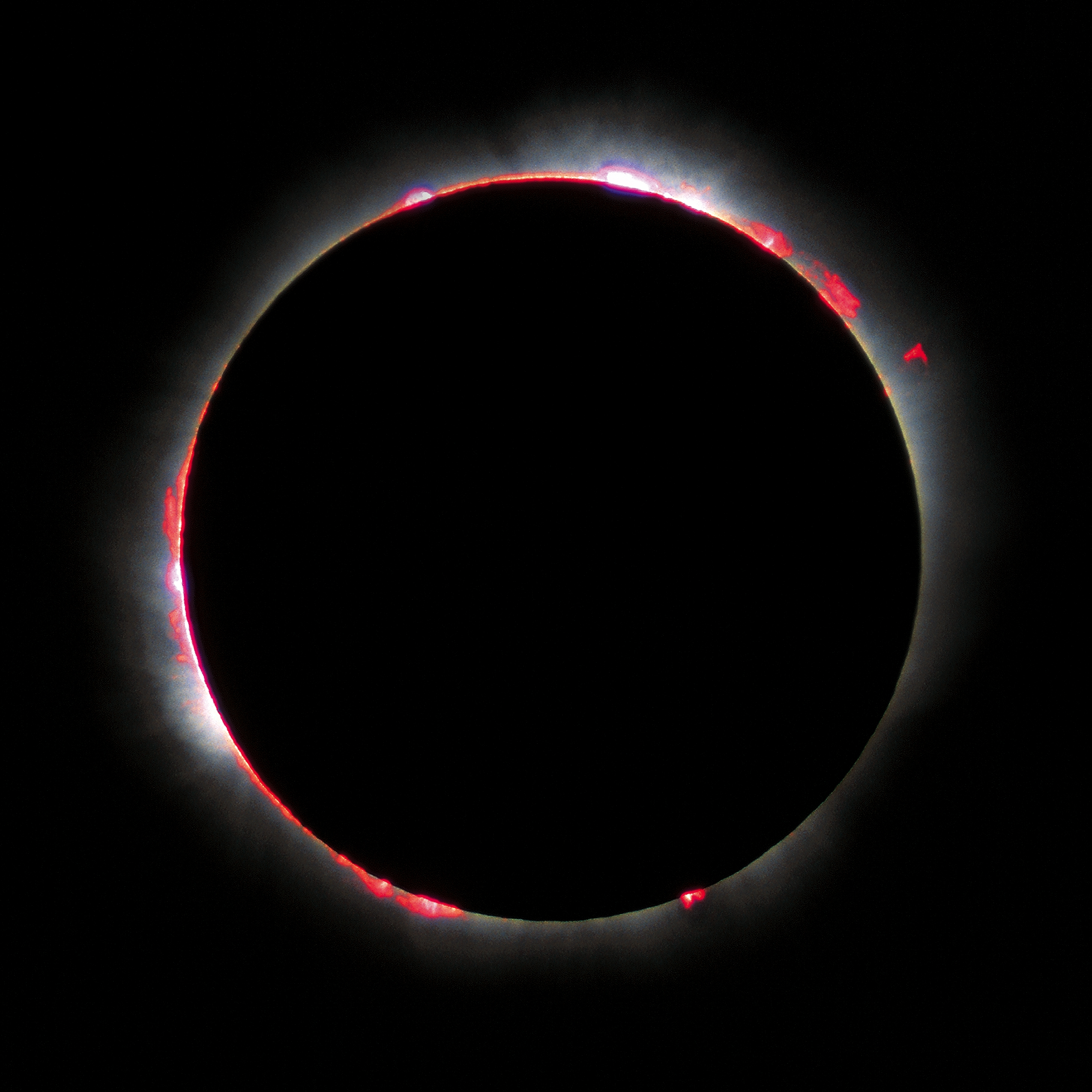
Chromosphere of the Sun showing the red H-alpha spectral line observed during an eclipse.

A 15 cm-aperture English-mounted Heliostatic refractor by the French optical firm of Lerebours et Secretan of Paris, acquired in 1850 and remodeled to 20 cm by Grubb-Parsons in 1898 to serve as a photoheliograph, has been in use since the early 1900s to obtain daily 20 cm white-light pictures of the sun, sky permitting. The 20 cm (7.9 in) refractor is used occasionally for cometary and occultation observations and sometimes made available to visitors for night-sky viewing.

Twin spectroheliographs giving 6 cm-diameter (2.4 in) full-disc photographs of the sun in K-alpha and H-alpha spectral lines are in regular use. A 46 cm-diameter (18 in) Foucault siderostat feeds light to a 30 cm-aperture f/22, Cooke triplet lens. The two prism K-alpha spectroheliographs were acquired in 1904 and the H-alpha diffraction grating spectroheliograph was operational in 1911. Since 1912, prominent pictures over the full limb are being obtained in K by blocking the solar disc. These observations and the white-light pictures are obtained around 200 days a year.

Light from the 46 cm siderostat is diverted to a 15 cm Zeiss achromat objective which provides an f/15 beam and a 2 cm image. A prefilter and a daystar Ca K narrow band filter are used together with a Photometrix 1k x 1k CCD to record the K filtergram. Regular observations began in 1996. Besides synoptic observations, temporal sequences are being obtained on days of good to excellent seeing.

=== Solar tunnel telescope ===
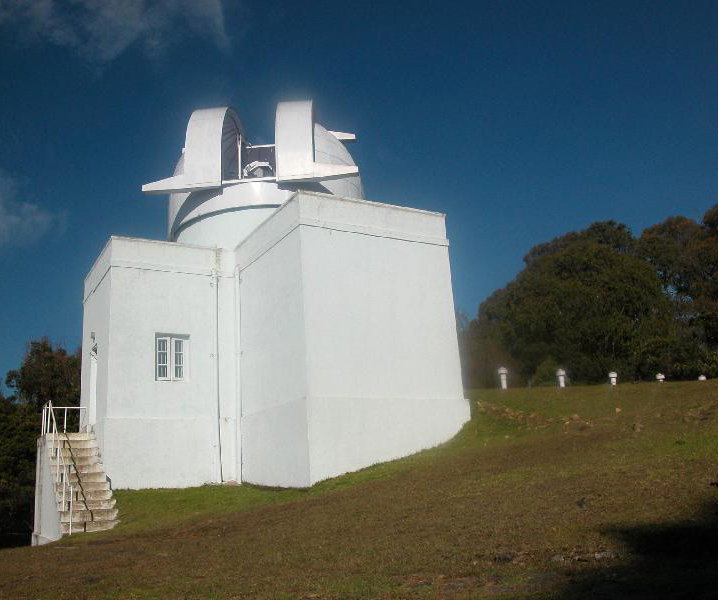
Solar Tunnel Telescope at Kodaikanal

A Grubb Parson 60 cm-diameter (24 in) two-mirror fused quartz coelostat mounted on an 11 m (36 ft) tower platform directs sunlight via a flat mirror into a 60 m-long (200 ft) underground horizontal 'tunnel'. A 38 cm aperture f/90 achromat forms a 34 cm-diameter (13 in) solar image at the focal plane. The telescope has an option to mount a 20 cm achromat, which provides an f/90 beam to form a 17 cm image.

A Littrow-type spectrograph is the main instrument of the telescope. A 20 cm diameter, 18 m-focal-length (59 ft) achromat in conjunction with a 600 lines/mm grating gives 9 mm/A dispersion in the fifth order of the grating. Together with the 5.5 arcsec/mm spatial resolution of the image, it forms a high resolution set up for solar spectroscopy. Recording of the spectrum can be done photographically or with a Photometrix 1k x 1k CCD system. A large format CCD system is being procured to enhance the coverage of spectrum especially for the broad resonance lines and the nearby continuum.

The converging solar beam from the objective can be diverted to a high-dispersion spectroheliograph with Littrow arrangement using a 3.43 m (11.3 ft) achromat. The photographic camera behind the second slit is being replaced by a Raticon linear array and a data acquisition system.

=== Ionosondes ===
The lab is equipped for studying the ionospheric and geomagnetic effects of solar activity. A NBS C3 analogue ionosonde was installed in 1955, for vertical soundings of the ionosphere. Quarterly soundings were made round the clock. In 1993, a digital ionosonde model IPS 42/DBD43 was commissioned enabling five minute or better sounding rates.

=== Other facilities ===
A high frequency Doppler radar was built indigenously and made operational to study F-region Skywave dynamics.

A lacour magnetometer and a Watson magnetometer were installed and have been used regularly at the observatory since the early 1900s.

They also have a broadband seismograph, GPS receiver and magnetic variometers.

The observatory has a popular astronomy museum on campus for the visitors. The displays are mainly pictorial, with a few models, a live solar image and the Fraunhofer spectrum also presented.

The library is one of the observatory's proud possessions. It has a collection of astronomical literature, which is of archival value. The library maintains a skeletal collection of current literature in solar and solar terrestrial physics.

The modern meeting and accommodation facilities are often used for national and international meetings, workshops and classes for up to 40 participants on subjects such as Kodaikanal Summer School in Physics, the Kodai-Trieste Workshop on Plasma Astrophysics and the Solar Physics Winter School.

== See also ==
- Kavasji Naegamvala
- List of astronomical observatories
