= Cockcroft (crater) =

Lunar impact crater

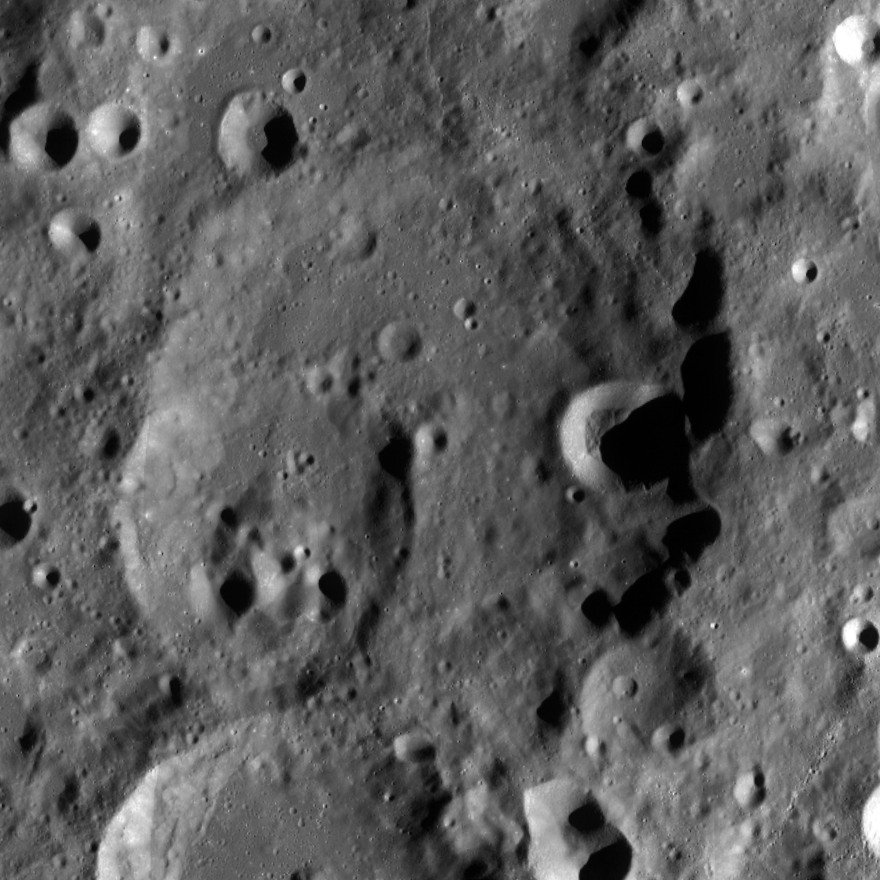
- LRO mosaic
- Coordinates: 31.3°N 162.6°W
- Diameter: 92.16 km (57.27 mi)
- Depth: Unknown
- Colongitude: 164° at sunrise
- Formation: Pre-Nectarian
- Eponym: John D. Cockcroft

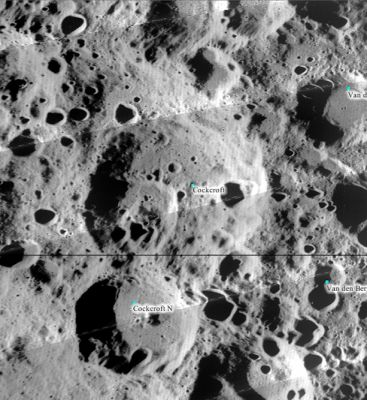
Cockcroft & Cockcroft N

Cockcroft is a degraded lunar impact crater that is situated on the far side of the Moon from the Earth, so that it has only been observed and photographed from orbit. It lies to the northeast of the larger crater Fitzgerald, and southeast of Evershed. Directly to the east is the smaller Van den Bergh crater.

This formation dates to the Pre-Nectarian period on the lunar geologic timescale. The rim is heavily worn and eroded from subsequent impacts. The satellite crater Cockcroft N is intruding into the south-southwestern rim. There are small craters along the rim to the southeast, east, and north-northwest, and a small crater lies along the eastern inner wall. The interior floor is uneven in places, particularly in the southern half, and contains multiple small and tiny craterlets. The remains of a crater appears to overlay the southwest quadrant of the interior.

This crater is named after English nuclear physicist John D. Cockcroft (1897–1967), the 1951 Nobel laureate in physics. Its designation was formally adopted by the International Astronomical Union in 1970.

== Satellite craters ==
By convention these features are identified on lunar maps by placing the letter on the side of the crater midpoint that is closest to Cockcroft.

Cockcroft	Latitude	Longitude	Diameter
N	29.1° N	163.7° W	56 km
