= Evershed effect =

The Evershed effect, named after the British astronomer John Evershed, is the radial flow of gas across the photospheric surface of the penumbra of sunspots from the inner border with the umbra towards the outer edge.

The speed varies from around 1 km/s at the border between the umbra and the penumbra to a maximum of around double this in the middle of the penumbra and falls off to zero at the outer edge of the penumbra. Evershed first detected this phenomenon in January 1909, whilst working at the Kodaikanal Solar Observatory in India, when he found that the spectral lines of sunspots showed doppler shift.

Afterwards, measurements of the spectral emission lines emitted in the ultraviolet wavelengths have shown a systematic red-shift. The Evershed effect is common to every spectral line formed at a temperature below 10^{5} K; this fact would imply a constant downflow from the transition region towards the chromosphere. The observed velocity is about 5 km/s. Of course, this is impossible, since if it were true, the corona would disappear in a short time instead of being suspended over the Sun at temperatures of million degrees over distances much larger than a solar radius.

Many theories have been proposed to explain this redshift in line profiles of the transition region, but the problem is still unsolved, since a coherent theory should take into account all the physical observations: UV line profiles are redshifted on average, but they show back and forth velocity oscillations at the same time.

In synthesis, the proposed mechanisms are:

- siphon flows in coronal loops driven by a pressure difference,
- different cross-sections of the coronal loops footpoints,
- the return of spicules,
- multiple flows,
- nanoflares, and
- thermal instabilities during chromospheric condensation.

The effect was commemorated in a postage stamp issued in India on 2 December 2008.

== See also ==
- Spectroscopy
- Plasma physics
