= Das (crater) =

Crater on the Moon

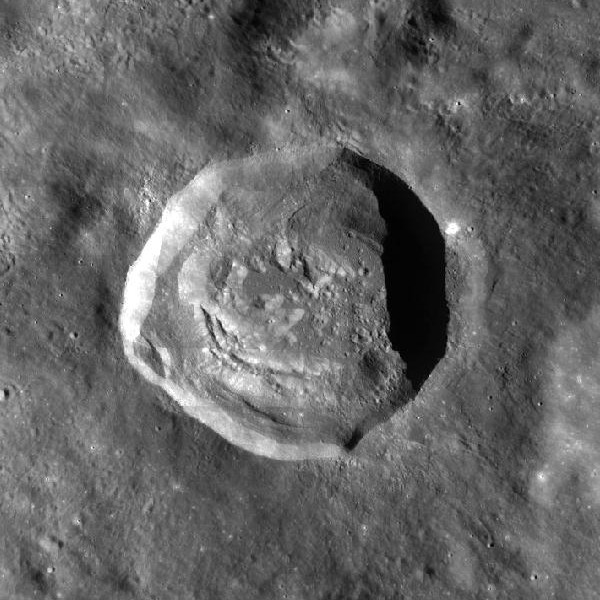
- LRO WAC image
- Coordinates: 26.6°S 136.8°W
- Diameter: 35.95 km (22.34 mi)
- Depth: Unknown
- Colongitude: 137° at sunrise
- Formation: Copernican
- Eponym: Anil Kumar Das

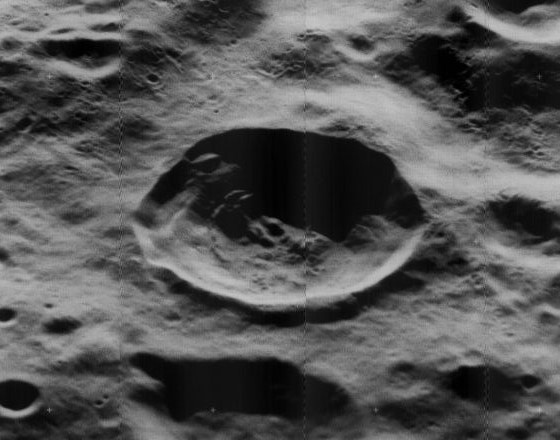
Oblique Lunar Orbiter 5 image

Das is a lunar impact crater on the far side of the Moon. It is located to the north-west of the walled plain named Chebyshev. To the south-west of Das is the irregular crater Mariotte, and Von der Pahlen lies to the east-northeast.

This crater has a sharp-edged rim that is not overlaid by any craters of note. It is roughly circular in shape, with slight bulges to the west and northwest. The inner walls have slumped toward the uneven interior floor, leaving a steeper slope near the rim.

Computer simulations suggest this crater can be formed by a 6 km diameter projectile striking the lunar surface with a speed of 10 km/s at an angle of 70° to the ground. This would have excavated the surface to a depth of around 3 km, which is much less than the crustal thickness. Hence, the resulting impact does not explain the presence of olivine or magnesium-rich spinel detected within Das. Instead, these minerals may have survived from the asteroid impactor.

Das lies at the center of a faint ray system. The higher albedo ejecta is continuous out to a distance of nearly two crater diameters, then forms wispy rays particularly to the northwest. These rays may overlap a second system to the east-southeast. Due to its prominent rays, Das is mapped as part of the Copernican system.

This crater is named after Indian solar astronomer Anil Kumar Das (1902–1961). Its designation was formally adopted by the International Astronomical Union in 1970.

== Satellite craters ==
By convention these features are identified on lunar maps by placing the letter on the side of the crater midpoint that is closest to Das.

Das	Latitude	Longitude	Diameter
G	26.9° S	135.2° W	32 km
