= John Evershed =

English astronomer

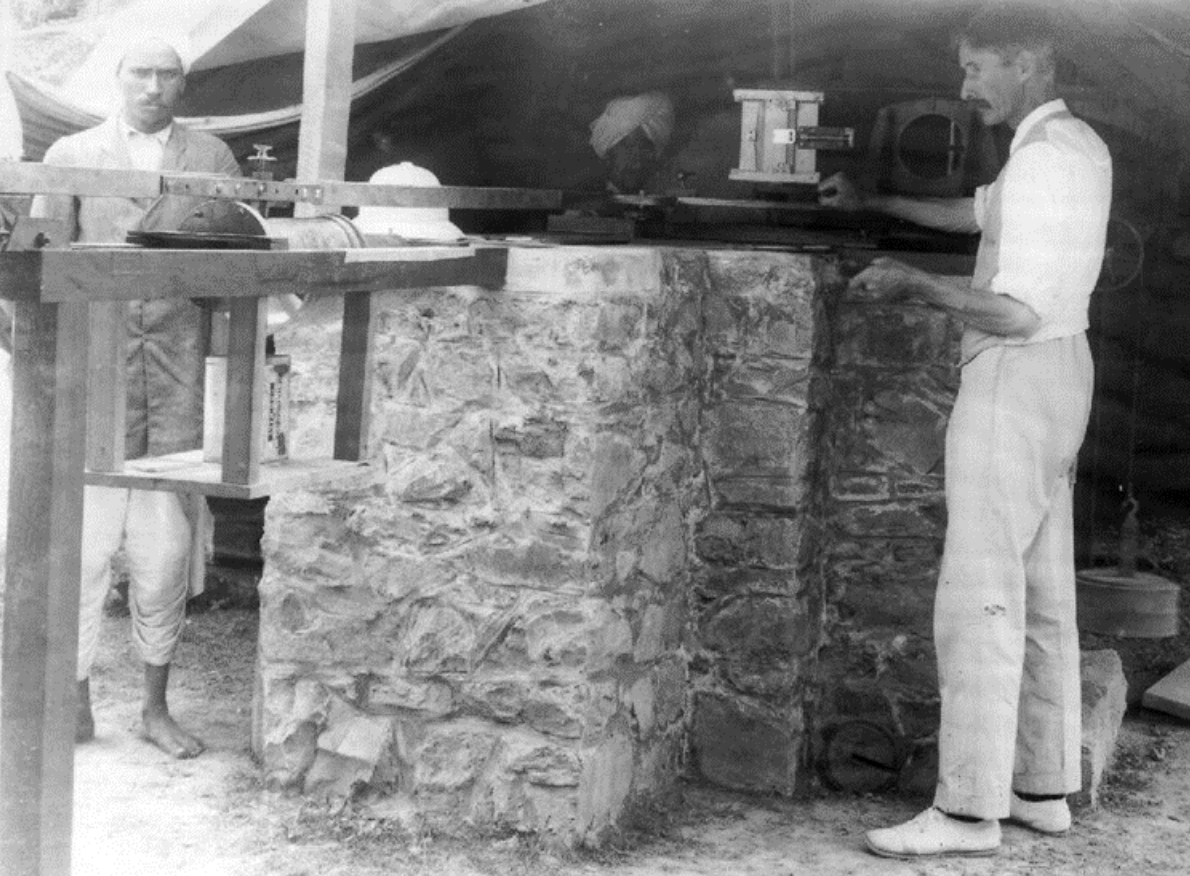
- Evershed at work in India
- Born: 26 February 1864; Gomshall, Surrey, UK
- Died: 17 November 1956 (aged 92); Ewhurst, Surrey, UK
- Known for: Evershed effect; Evershed crater
- Spouse: Mary Acworth Orr Evershed
- Awards: FRS (1915); Gold Medal of the Royal Astronomical Society (1918)
- Scientific career
- Fields: Astronomy

John Evershed CIE FRS FRAS (26 February 1864 – 17 November 1956) was an English astronomer. He was the first to observe radial motions in sunspots, a phenomenon now known as the Evershed effect.

== Biography ==
Evershed was born in Gomshall, Surrey to John and Sophia (née Price) Evershed. He made the discovery which bears his name while at Kodaikanal Observatory in 1909. After retirement in 1923 he set up a private observatory at Ewhurst, Surrey and built a large spectroheliograph of special design and another with high-dispersion liquid prism. He continued to study the wave-lengths of H and K lines in prominences, giving values of the solar rotation at high levels in different latitudes and at different phases of the solar cycle. Work continued until 1950 when the observatory closed and he presented some of his instruments to the Royal Greenwich Observatory at Herstmonceux. In the autumn of 1890 was a founding member of the British Astronomical Association. He directed its Solar Spectroscopy Section (1893-1899) and Spectroscopic Section (1924-1926).

== Awards and honours ==
In 1894 Evershed was elected a Fellow of the Royal Astronomical Society, in 1918 he was awarded the Gold Medal of the Royal Astronomical Society. He was elected a Fellow of the Royal Society in May, 1915. The Evershed crater on the Moon is named in his honour. He was awarded as a Companion of the Indian Empire on his retirement in 1923.

== Personal life ==
Evershed married fellow astronomer Mary Acworth Orr Evershed on 4 September 1906 at Claughton near Scarborough, Yorkshire. Following the death of his wife in 1949 he married Margaret Randall in 1950. He died in Ewhurst, Surrey on 17 November 1956. He also had interest in lepidoptera and other insects. W. H. Evans described a butterfly Thoressa evershedi in 1910 and named it after Evershed who had collected the type specimen. In 2015 his archive was acquired by the Science Museum, London.

== Bibliography ==
Monthly Notices of the Royal Astronomical Society

- Report of his Observatory. vol. 94 (1934), p. 318
- Report of his Observatory. vol. 95 (1935), p. 379
- Report of his Observatory. vol. 96 (1936), p. 337
- Report of his Observatory. vol. 97 (1937), p. 327
- Report of his Observatory. vol. 98 (1938), p. 296
- Report of his Observatory. vol. 100 (1940), p. 298
- Report of his Observatory. vol. 102 (1942), p. 94
- Report of his Observatory. vol. 103 (1943), p. 84
- Report of his Observatory. vol. 105 (1945), p. 122
- Report of his Observatory. vol. 106 (1946), p. 59
- Report of his Observatory. vol. 107 (1947), p. 81
- Report of his Observatory. vol. 108 (1948), p. 78
- Report of his Observatory. vol. 109 (1949), p. 177
- Report of his Observatory. vol. 110 (1950), p. 164
- Report of his Observatory. vol. 111 (1951), p. 216

Nature

- The Chromosphere. vol. 37 (1887), p. 79
- The Corona Spectrum. vol. 48 (1893), p. 268
- A Remarkable Flight of Birds. vol. 52 (1895), p. 508
- The Corona Spectrum. vol. 56 (1897), p. 444
- Solar Radiation. vol. 58 (1898), p. 619
- Absorption Markings in “K” Spectroheliograms. vol. 86 (1911), p. 348
- Absorption Markings in “K” Spectroheliograms. vol. 87 (1911), p. 111
- Butterfly Migration in Relation to Mimicry. vol. 89 (1912), p. 659
- Luminous Halos surrounding Shadows of Heads. vol. 90 (1913), p. 592
- The Green Flash. vol. 95 (1915), p. 286
- A Question of Albedo. vol. 96 (1915), p. 369
- Scarcity of Wasps in Kashmir in 1916. vol. 99 (1917), p. 185
- Observations of Nova Aquilæ in India. vol. 102 (1918), p. 105
- The Magnetic Storm of August 11–12, 1919. vol. 104 (1920), p. 436
- Terrestrial Magnetic Disturbances and Sun-spots. vol. 108 (1921), p. 566
- Optical Definition and Resolving Power. vol. 110 (1922), p. 179
- The Green Flash at Sunset. vol. 111 (1923), p. 13
- An Uncommon Type of Cloud. vol. 112 (1923), p. 901
- Photographic Studies of Solar Prominences. 116 (1925), p. 30
- Letter to Editor. vol. 116 (1925), p. 395
- The ‘Green Flash’. vol. 120 (1927), p. 876

Journal of the British Astronomical Association,

- The Distribution of the Solar Prominence of 1891. vol. 2 (1892), p. 174
- Some recent attempts to photograph the Faculae and Prominences. vol. 3 (1893), p. 269
- The Cause of the Darkness of Sun Spots. vol. 7 (1897), p. 190
- A New Arrangement of Prisms for a Solar Prominence Spectroscope. vol. 7 (1897), p. 331

The Observatory

- The Flash-Spectrum. vol. 25 (1902), p. 198
- The Flash-Spectrum. vol. 25 (1902), p. 272
- Sun-Spots and Magnetic Storms. vol. 27 (1904), p. 129
- The Rumford Spectrograph of the Yerkes Observatory. vol. 27 (1904), p. 164
- Sun-Spots and Solar Temperature. vol. 31 (1908), p. 462
- Helium Absorption in the Sun. vol. 31 (1908), p. 212
- Water-Vapour Lines in the Spot-Spectrum. vol. 32 (1909), p. 101
- Sun-spots and the Solar Temperature. vol. 32 (1909), p. 135
- Pressure in the Reversing Layer. vol. 32 (1909), p. 254
- Radial Movement in Sun-spots. vol. 32 (1909), p. 291
- Pressure in the Reversing Layer. vol. 32 (1909), p.
- Dante and Mediaeval Astronomy (with Evershed, M. A.). vol. 34 (1911), p. 440
- Radium and the Chromosphere. vol. 35 (1912), p. 360
- Some Problems of Astronomy (XIV The Displacement of the Lines of the Solar Spectrum Towards the Red). vol. 37 (1914), p. 124
- The General Shift of Fraunhofer Lines Towards the Red. vol. 37 (1914), p. 388
- Anomalous Dispersion in the Sun. vol. 39 (1916), p. 59
- Large Prominences. vol. 39 (1916), p. 392
- Anomalous Dispersion in the Sun. vol. 39 (1916), p. 432
- The Einstein Effect and the Eclipse of 1919 May 29. vol. 40 (1917), p. 269
- Day and Night "Seeing". vol. 40 (1917), p. 407
- The Displacement of the Cyanogen Bands in the Solar Spectrum. vol. 41 (1918), p. 371
- The Positive-on-Negative Method of Measuring Spectra. vol. 41 (1918), p. 443
- The Displacement of the Solar Lines Reflected by Venus. vol. 42 (1919), p. 51
- Calcium Clouds in the Milky Way. vol. 42 (191), p. 85
- The Pulsation Theory of Cepheid Variables. vol. 42 (1919), p. 124
- The Moon in Daylight. vol. 42 (1919), p. 339
- Displacement of the Lines in the Solar Spectrum and Einstein's Prediction. vol. 43 (1920), p. 153
- The Relativity Shift in the Solar Spectrum. vol. 44 (1921), p. 243
- The Spectrum of Sirius. vol. 45 (1922), p. 296
- The Einstein Effect in the Solar Spectrum. vol. 46 (1923), p. 299
- Stationary Calcium in Space. vol. 47 (1924), p. 53
- The Height of the Chromosphere. vol. 48 (1925), p. 45
- The Height of the Chromosphere. vol. 48 (1925), p. 146
- The Green Flash. vol. 49 (1926), p. 369
- Recent Work at Arcetri (with Evershed, M. A.). vol. 55 (1932), p. 254
- The Central Intensities of the Fraunhofer Lines. vol. 56 (1933), p. 275
- The Problem of the Red Shift in the Solar Spectrum. vol. 60 (1937), p. 266
- Obituary: George Ellery Hale. vol. 61 (1938), p. 163
- Sunspots and Magnetic Storms. vol. 63 (1940), p. 47
- The Magnetic Effect in Sunspot Spectra. vol. 65 (1944), p. 190
- Spectrum Lines in Chromospheric Flares. vol. 68 (1948), p. 67
- The Central Intensities of the Fraunhofer Lines. vol. 69 (1949), p. 109
