= Kunowsky =

Kunowsky may refer to:

- Georg Karl Friedrich Kunowsky (1786–1846), a German lawyer and amateur astronomer; and objects named after him:
  - Kunowsky (lunar crater)
  - Kunowsky (Martian crater)
