= Plato (crater) =

Crater on the Moon

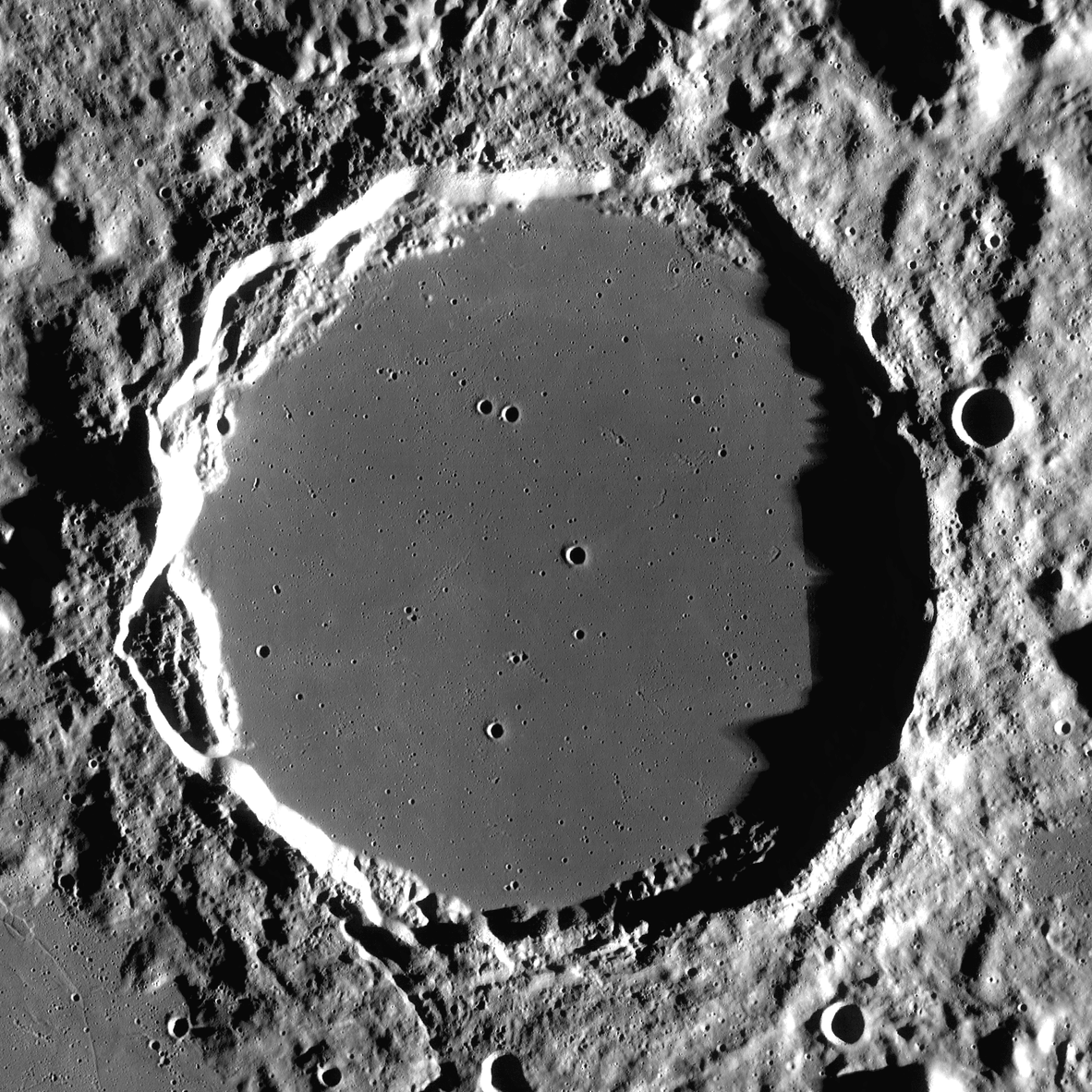
- Lunar Reconnaissance Orbiter image
- Coordinates: 51.6°N 9.3°W
- Diameter: 101 km (63 mi)
- Depth: 1,468 m (4,816 ft)
- Colongitude: 9° at sunrise
- Formation: Upper Imbrian
- Eponym: Plato

Plato is a lava-filled lunar impact crater on the Moon. Its diameter is 101 km (63 mi). It was named after ancient Greek philosopher Plato. It is located on the northeastern shore of the Mare Imbrium, at the western extremity of the Montes Alpes mountain range. In the mare to the south are several rises collectively named the Montes Teneriffe. To the north lies the wide stretch of the Mare Frigoris. East of the crater, among the Montes Alpes, are several rilles collectively named the Rimae Plato.

== Description ==
On the lunar geologic timescale, Plato is one of the largest craters of Upper (Late) Imbrian age. The age of Plato is about 3.84 billion years, only slightly younger than the Mare Imbrium to the south.

The rim is irregular with 2 km-tall (1.2 mi) jagged peaks that project prominent shadows across the crater floor when the Sun is at a low angle. Sections of the inner wall display signs of past slumping, most notably a large triangular slide along the western side. The rim of Plato is circular, but from the Earth it appears oval due to foreshortening. Its northwest rim is characterised by a very high rockfall density by lunar standards.

The flat floor of Plato has a relatively low albedo, making it appear dark in comparison to the surrounding rugged terrain. T. W. Webb describes it as a "steel-gray" spot. The floor is free of significant impact craters and lacks a central peak. However, there are a few small craterlets scattered across the floor.

Plato has developed a reputation for transient lunar phenomena, including flashes of light, unusual colour patterns, and areas of hazy visibility. These anomalies are likely a result of seeing conditions, combined with the effects of different illumination angles of the Sun.

== Gallery ==
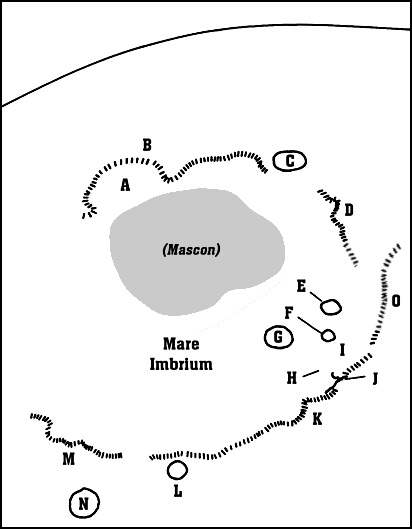
Detail map of Mare Imbrium's features. Plato is the feature marked "C".

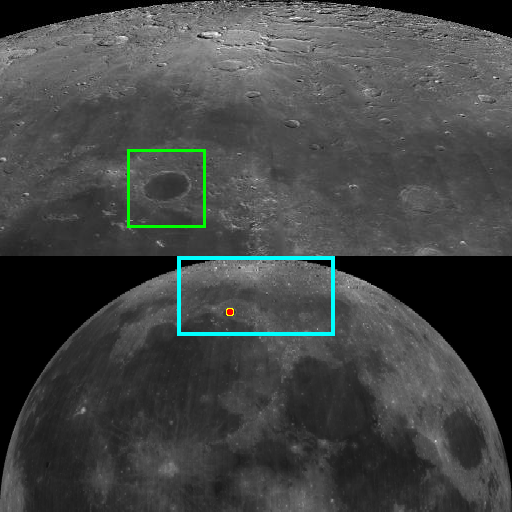
Location of Plato from Clementine images

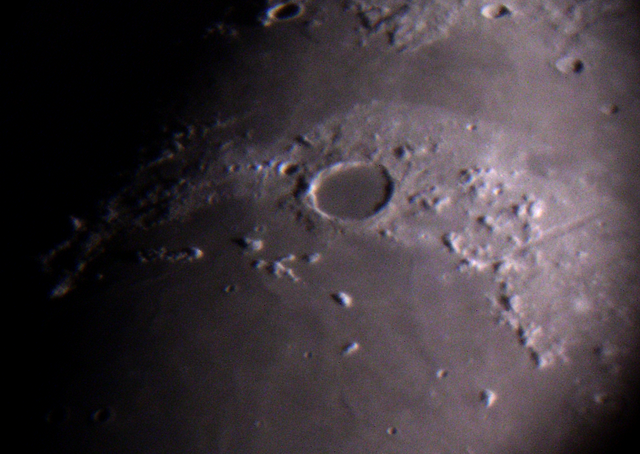
Plato (center) in a telescopic photograph (viewed from Earth)

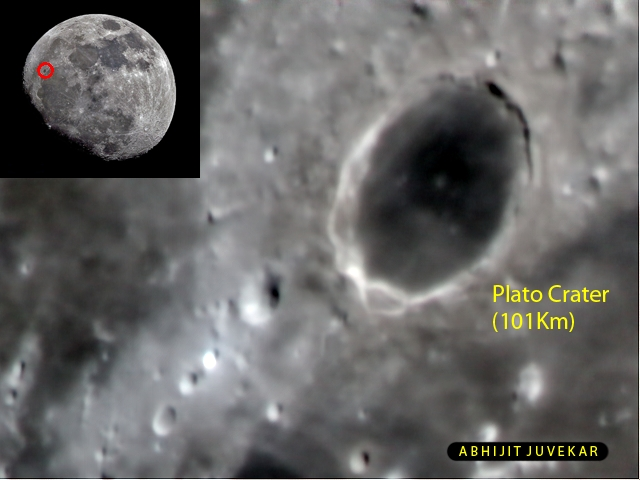
Plato (viewed from Earth)

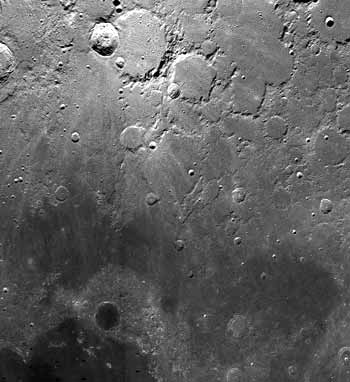
Photo of Mare Frigoris. Plato is the dark circular feature to the south of the mare.

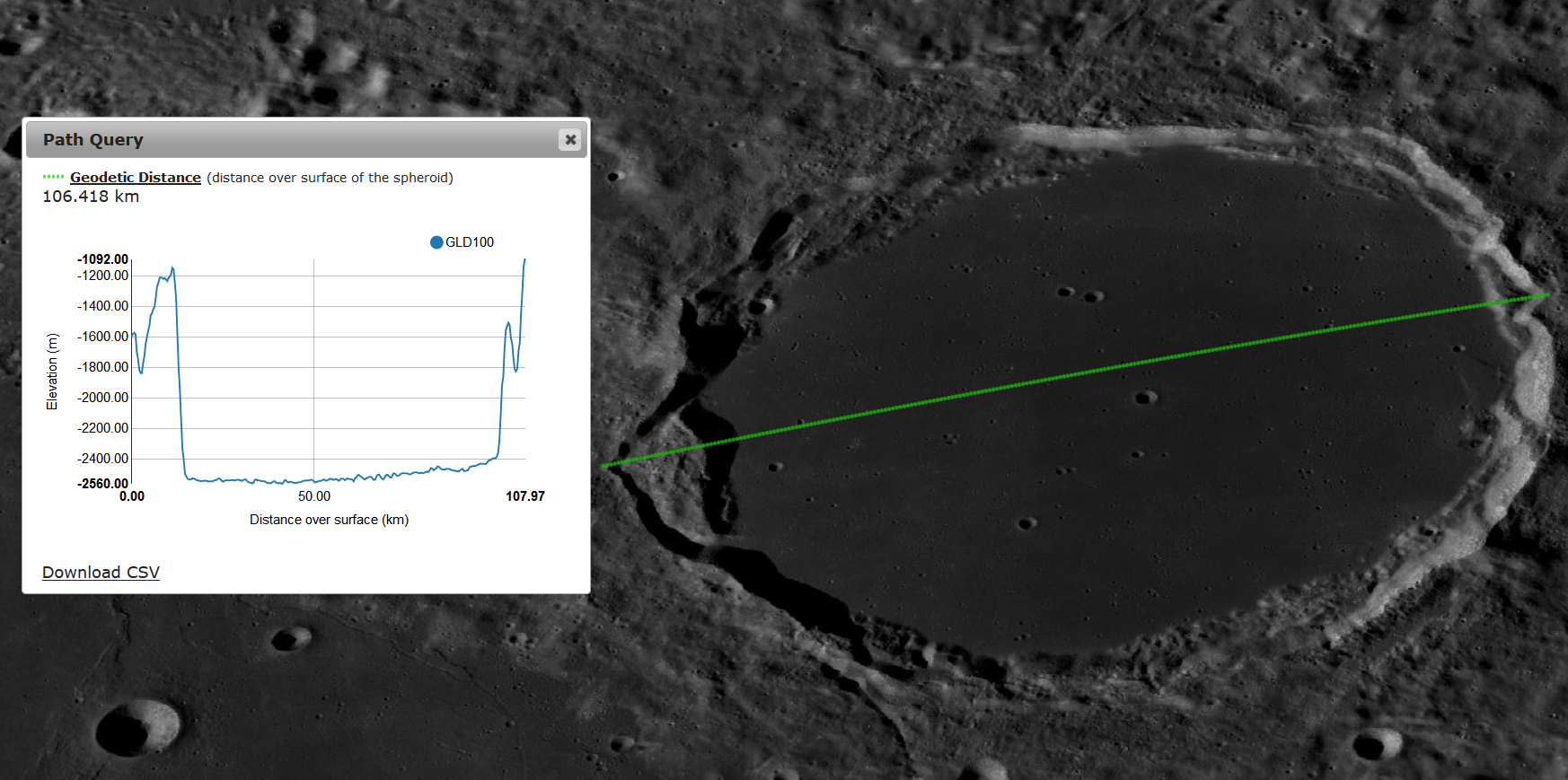
Plato as taken from Lunar Reconnaissance Orbiter data, inset graph shows elevations of green line, left to right.

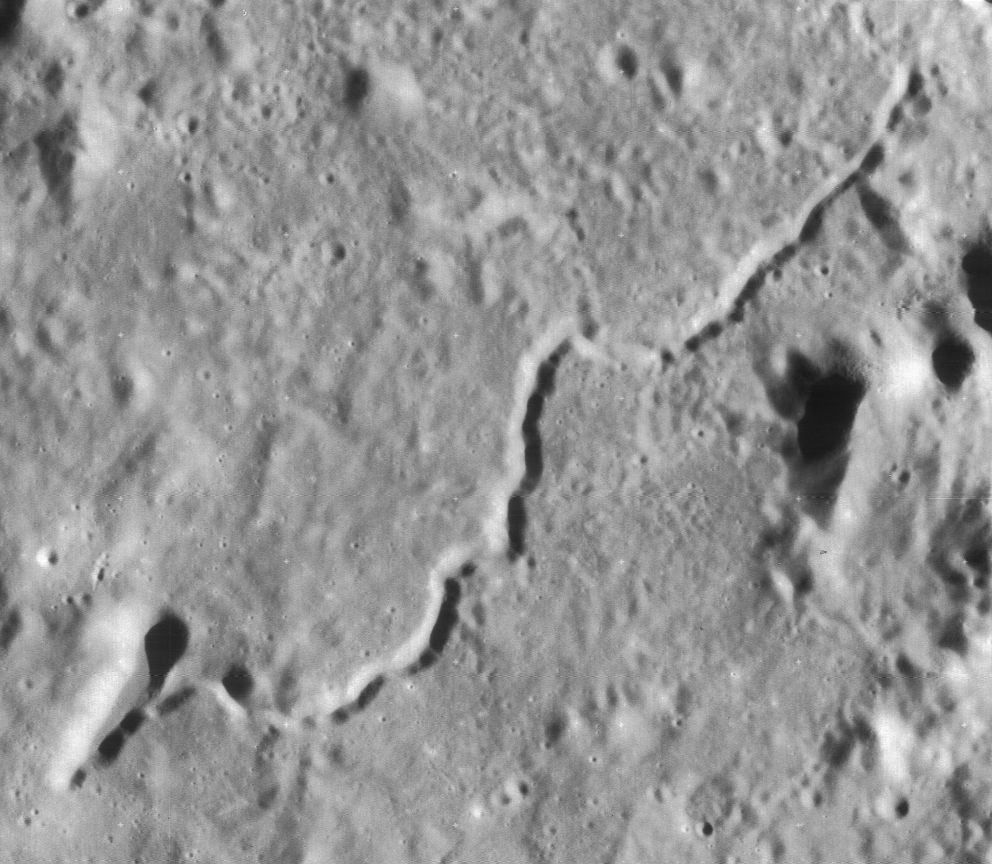
Rimae Plato by Lunar Orbiter 4

== Satellite craters ==
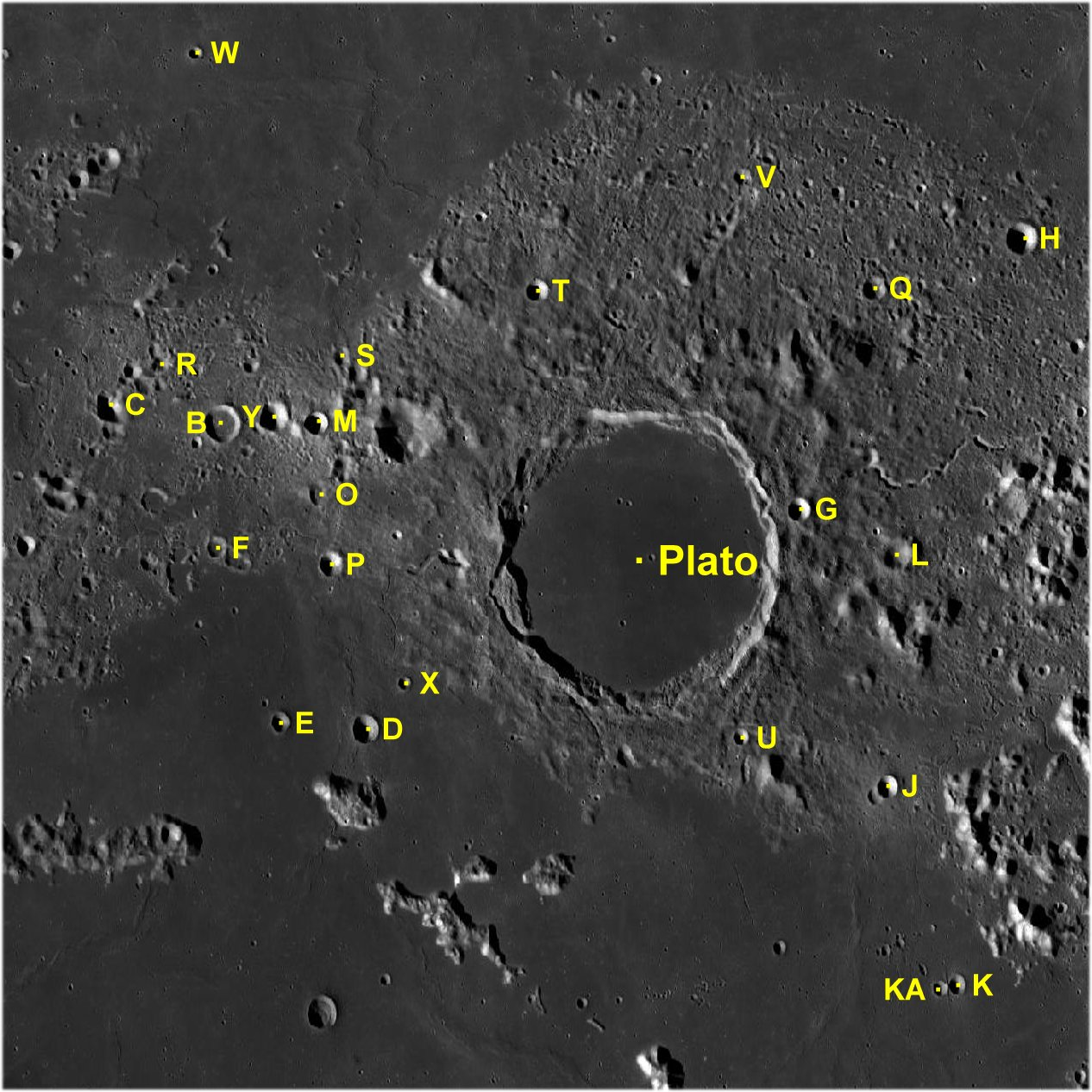
Plato and its satellite craters

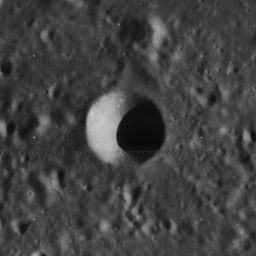
Satellite crater Plato H

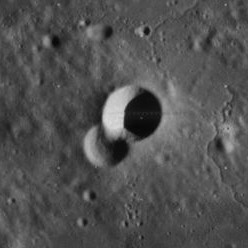
Satellite crater Plato J

By convention these features are identified on lunar maps by placing the letter on the side of the crater midpoint that is closest to Plato.

Plato	Latitude	Longitude	Diameter
B	53.0° N	17.2° W	13 km
C	53.2° N	19.4° W	10 km
D	49.6° N	14.5° W	10 km
E	49.7° N	16.2° W	7 km
F	51.7° N	17.4° W	7 km
G	52.1° N	6.3° W	8 km
H	55.1° N	2.0° W	11 km
J	49.0° N	4.6° W	8 km
K	46.8° N	3.3° W	6 km
KA	46.8° N	3.6° W	6 km
L	51.6° N	4.3° W	10 km
M	53.1° N	15.4° W	8 km
O	52.3° N	15.4° W	9 km
P	51.5° N	15.2° W	8 km
Q	54.5° N	4.8° W	8 km
R	53.8° N	18.3° W	6 km
S	53.8° N	14.9° W	6 km
T	54.5° N	11.2° W	8 km
U	49.6° N	7.4° W	6 km
V	55.8° N	7.4° W	6 km
W	57.2° N	17.8° W	4 km
X	50.1° N	13.8° W	5 km
Y	53.1° N	16.3° W	10 km

The following craters have been renamed by the IAU:

- Plato A—See Bliss (crater).

== In fiction ==
The crater Plato is the location of an observatory in Arthur C. Clarke's novel Earthlight (1955), of the lunar "warren" Hong Kong Luna in Robert A. Heinlein's novel The Moon Is a Harsh Mistress (1966), and of Moonbase Alpha in the science-fiction TV series Space: 1999.

Crater Plato is the home crater of Matthew Looney and Maria Looney, protagonists of the Looney series of children's books set on the Moon, written by Jerome Beatty.

== Further sources ==
- Andersson, Leif E.; Whitaker, Ewen A. (1982). NASA Catalogue of Lunar Nomenclature (PDF). NASA RP-1097.
- Cocks, Elijah E.; Cocks, Josiah C. (1995). Who's Who on the Moon: A Biographical Dictionary of Lunar Nomenclature. Tudor Publishers. ISBN 978-0-936389-27-1.
- McDowell, Jonathan (July 15, 2007). "Lunar Nomenclature". Jonathan's Space Report. Archived from the original on 2012-02-08.
- Menzel, Donald H.; Minnaert, Marcel; Levin, Boris J.; Dollfus, Audouin; Bell, Barbara (1971). "Report on Lunar Nomenclature by the Working Group of Commission 17 of the IAU". Space Science Reviews. 12 (2): 136–186. Bibcode:1971SSRv...12..136M. doi:10.1007/BF00171763. S2CID 122125855.
- Moore, Patrick (2001). On the Moon. Sterling Publishing Co. ISBN 978-0-304-35469-6.
- Price, Fred W. (1988). The Moon Observer's Handbook. Cambridge University Press. ISBN 978-0-521-33500-3.
- Rükl, Antonín (1990). Atlas of the Moon. Kalmbach Books. ISBN 978-0-913135-17-4.
- Whitaker, Ewen A. (1999). Mapping and Naming the Moon. Cambridge University Press. ISBN 978-0-521-62248-6.
- Wlasuk, Peter T. (2000). Observing the Moon. Springer. ISBN 978-1-85233-193-1.
