= Maestlin (crater) =

Crater on the Moon

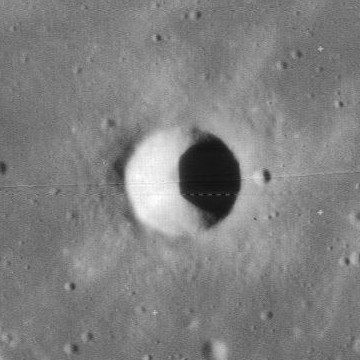
- Lunar Orbiter 4 image
- Coordinates: 4.9°N 40.6°W
- Diameter: 7 km
- Depth: 1.6 km
- Colongitude: 41° at sunrise
- Eponym: Michael Maestlin

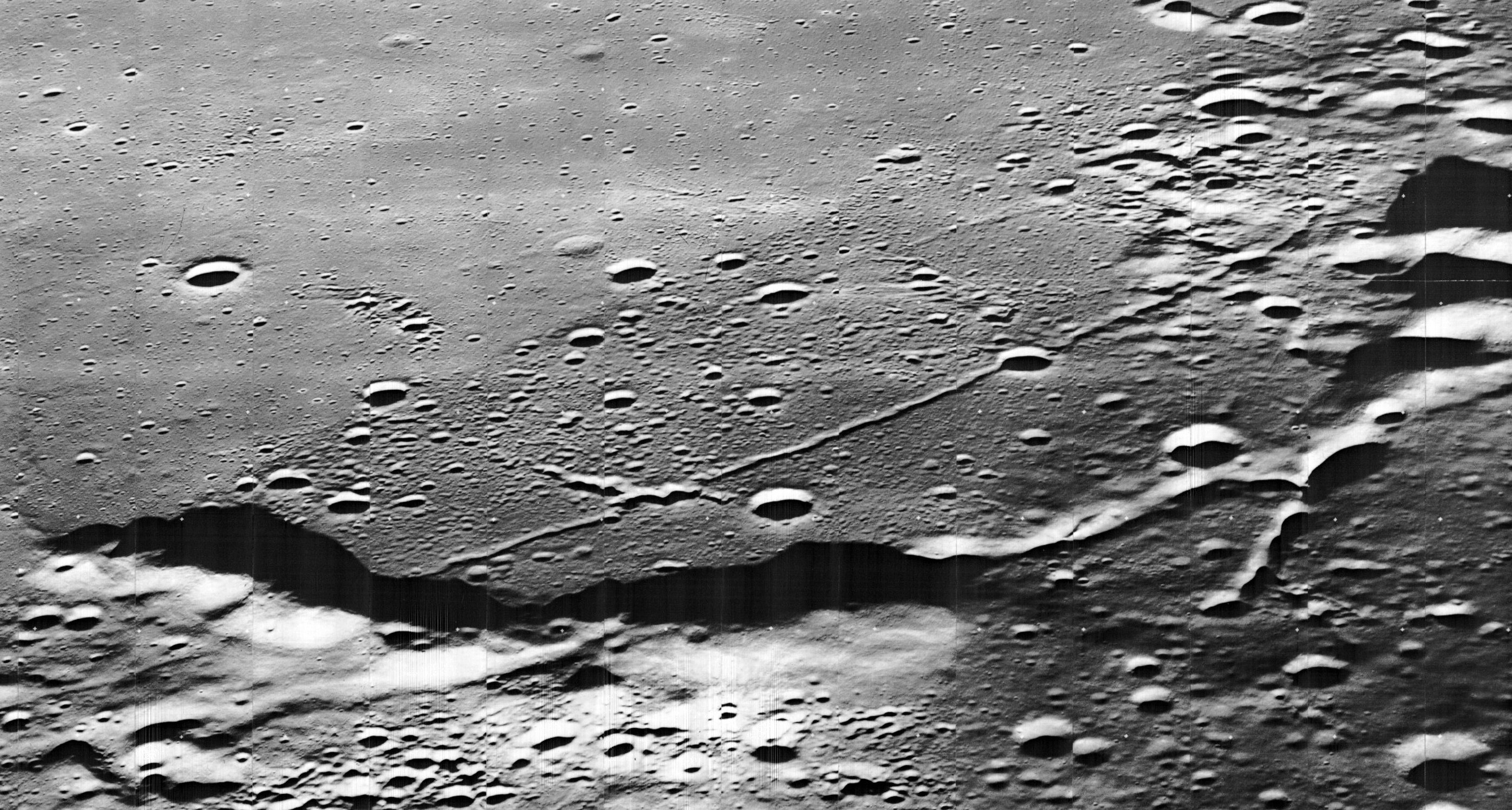
Oblique Lunar Orbiter 3 image of some of the Rimae Maestlin

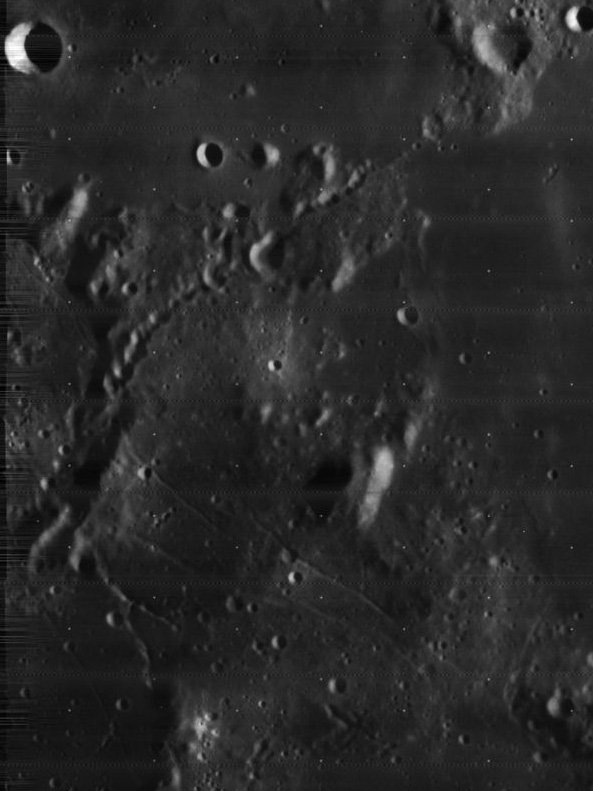
Lunar Orbiter 4 image with Maestlin crater in upper left corner and Rimae Maestlin to the southeast of it

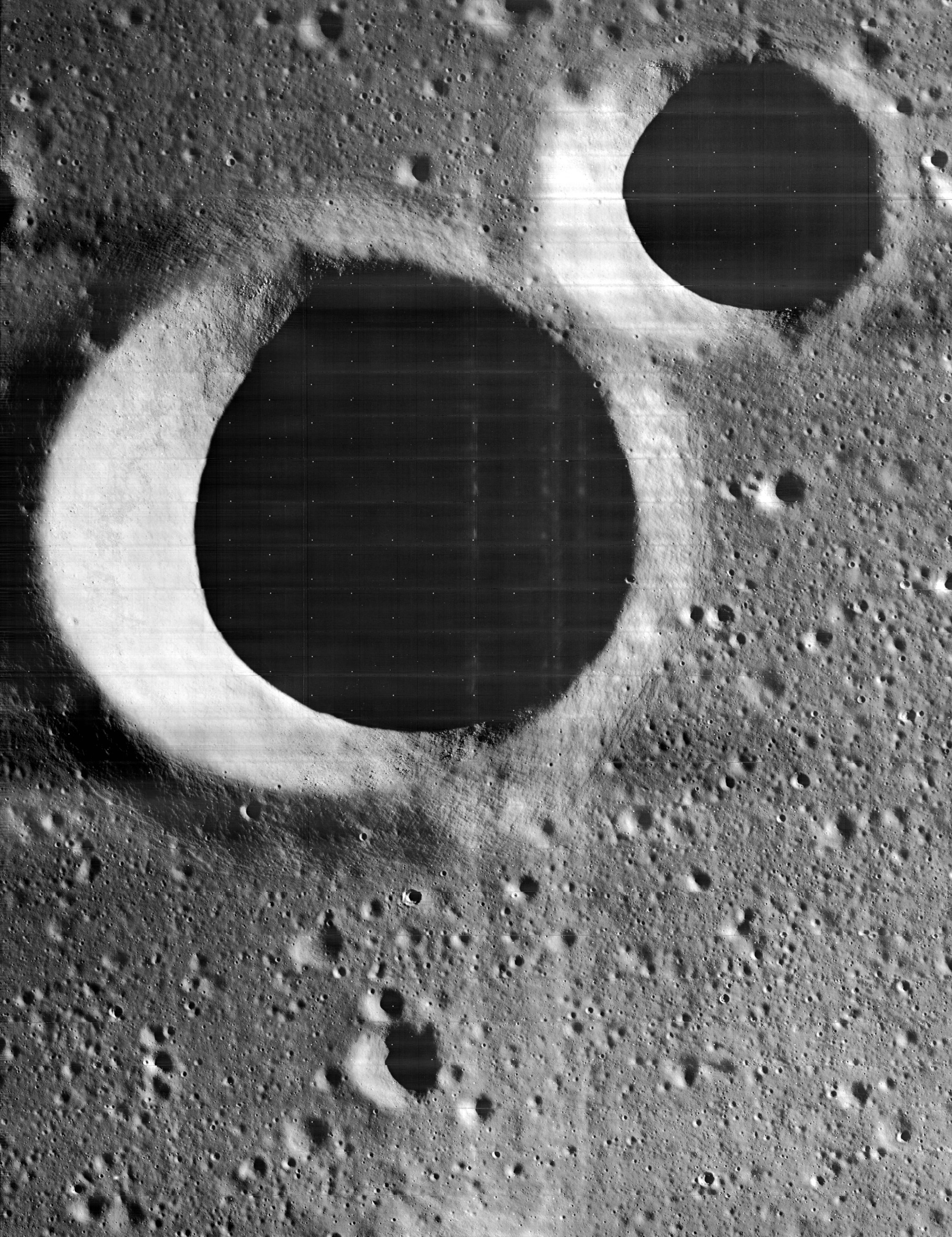
Maestlin G crater, from Lunar Orbiter 3

Maestlin is a small, bowl-shaped impact crater located near the eastern edge of the lunar Oceanus Procellarum. It was named after German mathematician Michael Maestlin. To the east lies the crater Encke and to the northeast is Kepler. Just to the southeast of Maestlin is the curved, ridge-like remains of Maestlin R, a walled plain that has been almost completed submerged by the mare. South of this feature is a system of linear rilles named Rimae Maestlin. The mare surface around Maestlin is dusted with ray material from Kepler.

== Satellite craters ==
By convention these features are identified on Lunar maps by placing the letter on the side of the crater midpoint that is closest to Maestlin.

Maestlin	Latitude	Longitude	Diameter
G	2.0° N	42.1° W	4 km
H	4.7° N	43.5° W	7 km
R	3.5° N	41.5° W	61 km
