= Tycho (lunar crater) =

Prominent lunar impact crater

Lunar crater Tycho
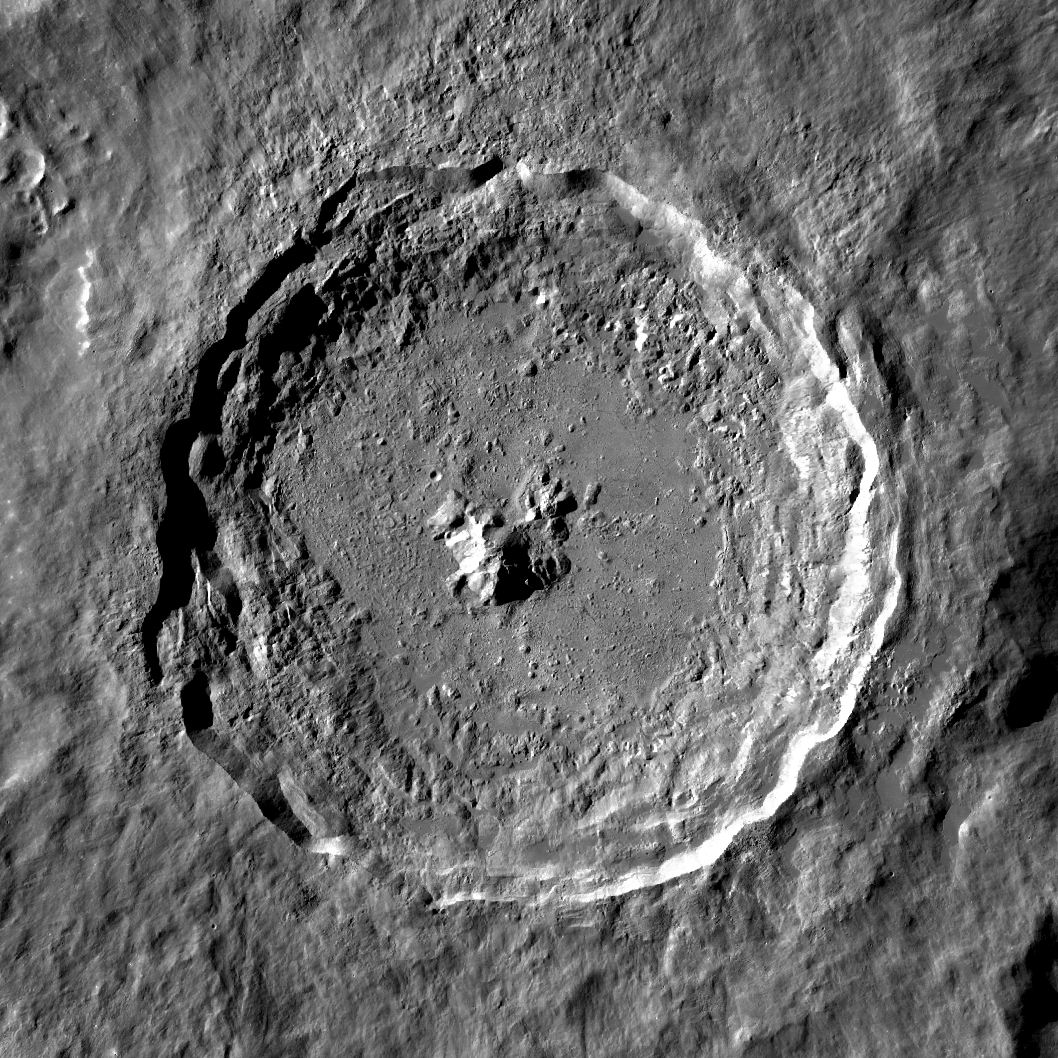
- The crater seen by Lunar Reconnaissance Orbiter (rotate display if there is a crater illusion due to the atypical position of the light source)
- Location: The Moon
- Coordinates: 43.31°S 11.36°W
- Diameter: c. 85 km
- Depth: c. 4.7 km (2.9 mi)
- Age: c. 108 million years
- Eponym: Tycho Brahe

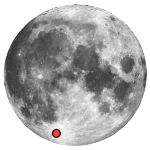
Location of the crater Tycho as seen from the Northern Hemisphere

3D model of Tycho

Tycho (/ˈtaɪkoʊ/) is a prominent lunar impact crater located in the southern highlands of the Moon, named after the Danish astronomer Tycho Brahe. It is around 108 million years old. It is one of the Moon's brightest craters, with a diameter of around 85 km (53 mi) and a depth of around 4.7 km (2.9 mi).

To the south of Tycho is the crater Street, to the east is Pictet, and to the north-northeast is Sasserides. The surface around Tycho is replete with craters of various sizes, many overlapping still older craters. Some of the smaller craters are secondary craters formed from larger chunks of ejecta from Tycho.

== Age and description ==
Tycho is relatively young, with an estimated age of 108 million years, based on analysis by NASA's Lunar Reconnaissance Orbiter. This age initially suggested that the impactor may have been a member of the Baptistina family of asteroids, but as the composition of the impactor is unknown this remained conjecture. However, this possibility was ruled out by the Wide-field Infrared Survey Explorer in 2011, as it was discovered that the Baptistina family was produced much later than expected, having formed around 80 million years ago.

The crater is sharply defined, unlike older craters that have been degraded by subsequent impacts. The interior has a high albedo that is prominent when The Sun is overhead, and the crater is surrounded by a distinctive ray system forming long spokes that reach as long as 1,500 kilometers. In absolute mileage terms, Tycho's ejecta field is approximately the same size as the K-Pg impactor ejecta field, and in proportional terms, the only terrestrial feature of comparable size is the Pacific Ocean. Sections of these rays can be observed even when Tycho is illuminated only by earthlight. Due to its prominent rays, Tycho is mapped as part of the Copernican System.

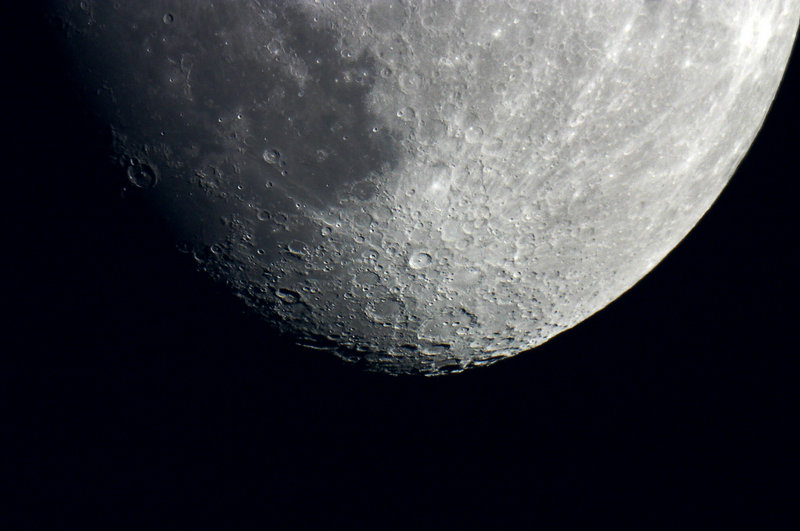
The large ray system centered on Tycho

The ramparts beyond the rim have a lower albedo than the interior for a distance of over a hundred kilometers, and are free of the ray markings that lie beyond. This darker rim may have been formed from minerals excavated during the impact.

Its inner wall is slumped and terraced, sloping down to a rough but nearly flat floor exhibiting small, knobby domes. The infrared spectrum of pure crystalline plagioclase has been identified on the southeast wall and rim. The floor displays signs of past volcanism, most likely from rock melt caused by the impact. Detailed photographs of the floor show that it is covered in a criss-crossing array of cracks and small hills. The central peaks rise 2,500 meters (8,200 ft) above the floor, and a lesser peak stands just to the northeast of the primary massif. Anorthosite with a very low mafic abundance has been detected in the central peaks.

Infrared observations of the lunar surface during an eclipse have demonstrated that Tycho cools at a slower rate than other parts of the surface, making the crater a "hot spot". This effect is caused by the difference in materials that cover the crater.

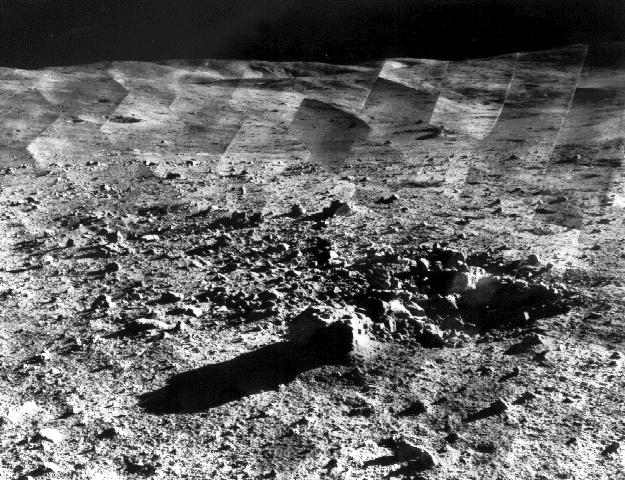
Panoramic view of the lunar surface taken by Surveyor 7, which landed around 29 km (18 mi) from the rim of Tycho

The rim of this crater was chosen as the target of the Surveyor 7 mission. The robotic spacecraft safely touched down north of the crater in January 1968. The craft performed chemical measurements of the surface, finding a composition different from the maria. From this, one of the main components of the highlands was theorized to be anorthosite, an aluminium-rich mineral. The crater was also imaged in great detail by Lunar Orbiter 5.

From the 1950s through the 1990s, NASA aerodynamicist Dean Chapman and others advanced the lunar origin theory of tektites. Chapman used complex orbital computer models and extensive wind tunnel tests to support the theory that the so-called Australasian tektites originated from the Rosse ejecta ray of Tycho. Until the Rosse ray is sampled, a lunar origin for these tektites cannot be ruled out, though tektites are now generally considered to have been produced by terrestrial impact events.

This crater was drawn on lunar maps as early as 1645, when Anton Schyrleus depicted the bright ray system.

== Names ==
Tycho is named after the Danish astronomer Tycho Brahe. Like many of the craters on The Moon's near side, it was given its name by the Italian astronomer Giovanni Riccioli, whose 1651 nomenclature system has become standardized. Earlier lunar cartographers had given the feature different names. Pierre Gassendi named it Umbilicus Lunaris ('the navel of the Moon'). van Langren's 1645 map calls it "Vladislai IV" after Władysław IV Vasa, King of Poland. And Johannes Hevelius named it 'Mons Sinai' after Mount Sinai.

== Satellite craters ==
By convention, these features are identified on lunar maps by placing the letter on the side of the crater midpoint that is closest to Tycho.

Tycho	Coordinates	Diameter
A	39.94°S 12.07°W	29 km
B	43.99°S 13.92°W	14 km
C	44.12°S 13.46°W	7 km
D	45.58°S 14.07°W	26 km
E	42.34°S 13.66°W	13 km
F	40.91°S 13.21°W	17 km
H	45.29°S 15.92°W	8 km
J	42.58°S 15.42°W	11 km
K	45.18°S 14.38°W	6 km
P	45.44°S 13.06°W	7 km
Q	42.50°S 15.99°W	20 km
R	41.91°S 13.68°W	4 km
S	43.47°S 16.30°W	3 km
T	41.15°S 12.62°W	14 km
U	41.08°S 13.91°W	20 km
V	41.72°S 15.43°W	4 km
W	43.30°S 15.38°W	21 km
X	43.84°S 15.25°W	12 km
Y	44.12°S 15.93°W	22 km
Z	43.23°S 16.35°W	23 km

== Fictional references ==
- There is a chapter entitled "Tycho" in Jules Verne's Around the Moon (Autour de la Lune, 1870) which describes the crater and its ray system.
- In the 1901 Novel A Honeymoon in Space by George Griffith, the first lunar destination of the Astronef is an abandoned town and temple located at the base of Tycho's central mountain, which once served as a refuge for the Moon's long-dead residents as the supply of air and water on the Moon's surface dwindled.
- In R.A. Heinlein's 1940 short story "Blowups Happen", a character speculates that Tycho may have been the location of a sentient race's main atomic power plant, in a past time when the Moon was still habitable—and that the plant exploded, causing the craters, the rays spreading from Tycho, and the death of all life on the Moon.
- C.D. Simak set his 1961 novelette The Trouble with Tycho, at the lunar crater. He also postulated that the crater's rays were composed of volcanic glass (tektites) akin to a theory postulated by NASA researchers Dean Chapman and John O'Keefe in the 1970s.
- In Heinlein's 1966 book The Moon Is a Harsh Mistress, Tycho is the location of the lunar habitat named "Tycho Under".
- Tycho was the location of the Tycho Magnetic Anomaly (TMA-1), and subsequent excavation of an alien monolith, in 2001: A Space Odyssey, the seminal 1968 science-fiction film by Stanley Kubrick and book by Arthur C. Clarke.
- In the 1987 film Can't Buy Me Love, Cindy notices Tycho while looking through a telescope on her final "contractual" date with Ronny in the Airplane Graveyard.
- It also serves as the location of "Tycho City" in the 1996 film Star Trek: First Contact; a lunar metropolis by the 24th century.
- In Jack Williamson's 2001 novel Terraforming Earth, the crater is utilized for "Tycho Base", a self-sustaining, robot-controlled installation aimed at restoring life to the (dead) planet Earth after an asteroid sterilizes the biosphere.
- In the 2019 film Ad Astra, the Moon base is situated in Tycho. This is Roy's first stop on his journey to Mars.
- Crater Tycho figures prominently in the Matthew Looney and Maria Looney series of children's books set on the Moon, authored by Jerome Beatty.
- In R.M. Allen's Hunted Earth novels, the 'naked purples' own a former penal colony in or around Tycho known as "Tycho Purple Penal" (see The Ring of Charon).
- Tycho is referenced in the band Cojum Dip's song, Waltz in E Major, Op. 15 "Moon Waltz".
- Tycho is referenced in the 2022 game Horizon Forbidden West as the site of a Helium-3 mine.
- In both the book series and TV adaptation The Expanse, Tycho is a mobile construction platform or space station.

== Gallery ==
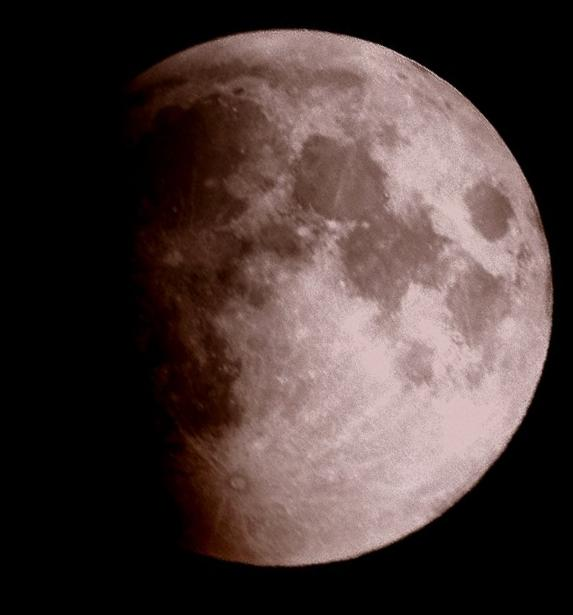
March 2007 lunar eclipse. The advancing shadow of Earth brings out detail on the lunar surface. The huge ray system emanating from Tycho is shown as the dominant feature on the southern hemisphere.

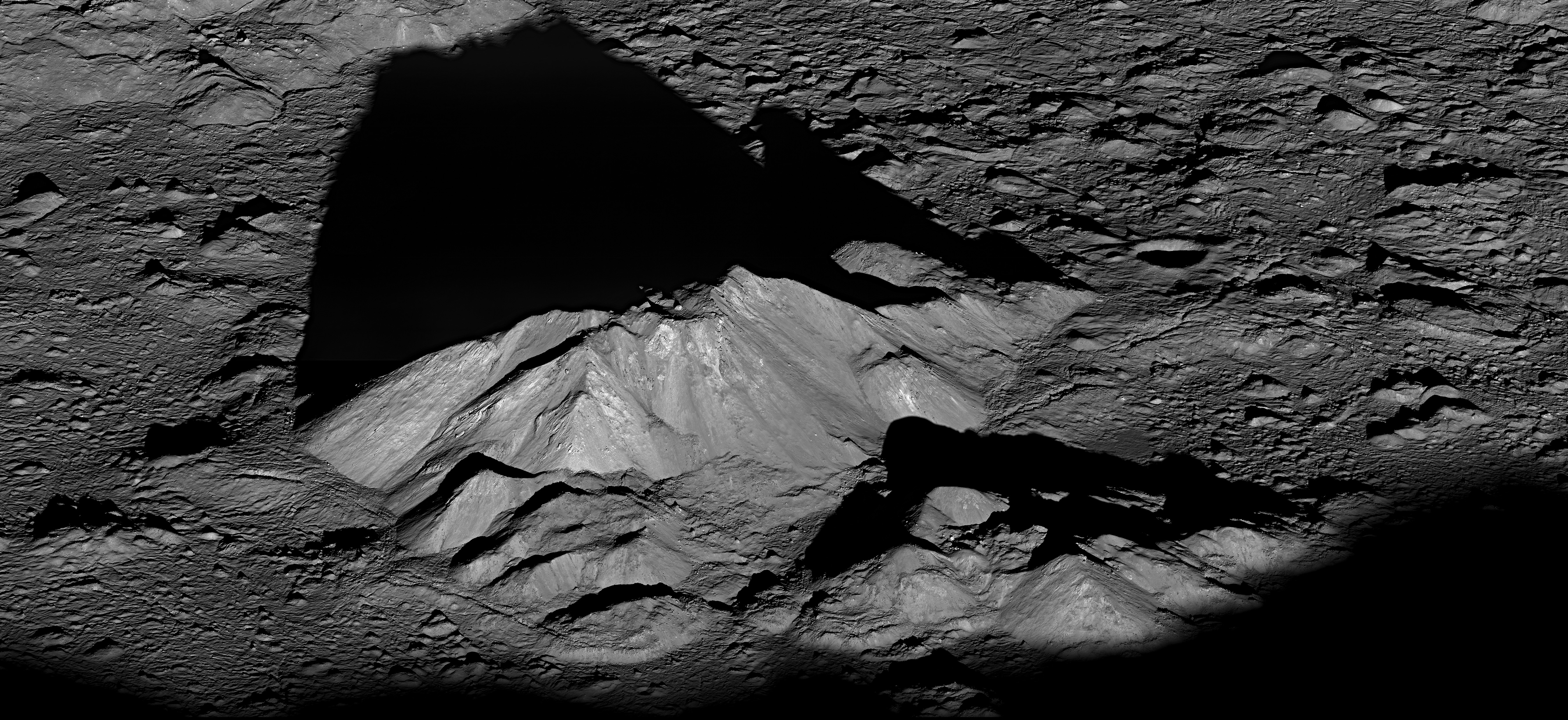
Central peak complex of Tycho, taken at sunrise by the Lunar Reconnaissance Orbiter in 2011

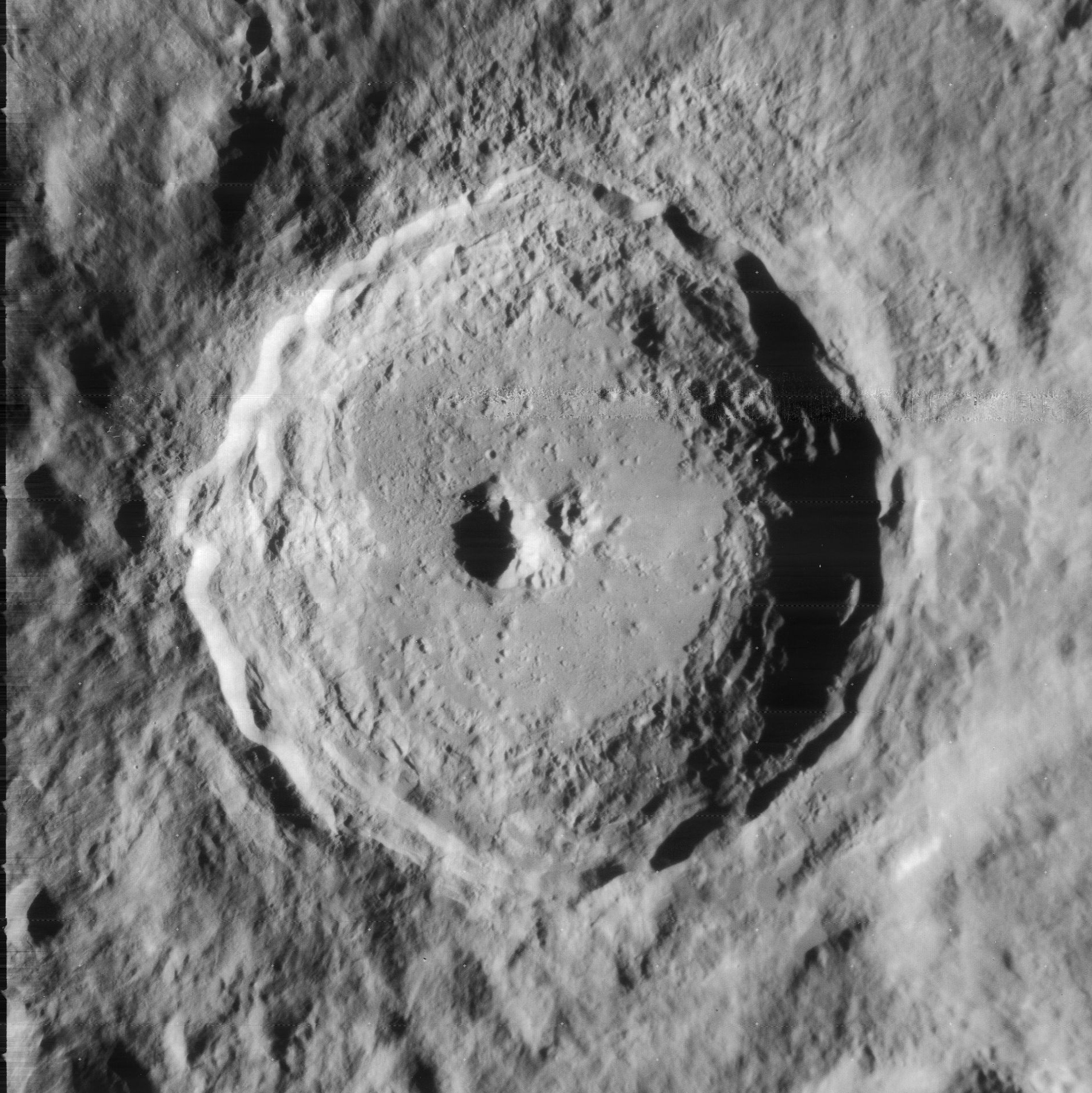
Lunar Orbiter 4 image from 1967

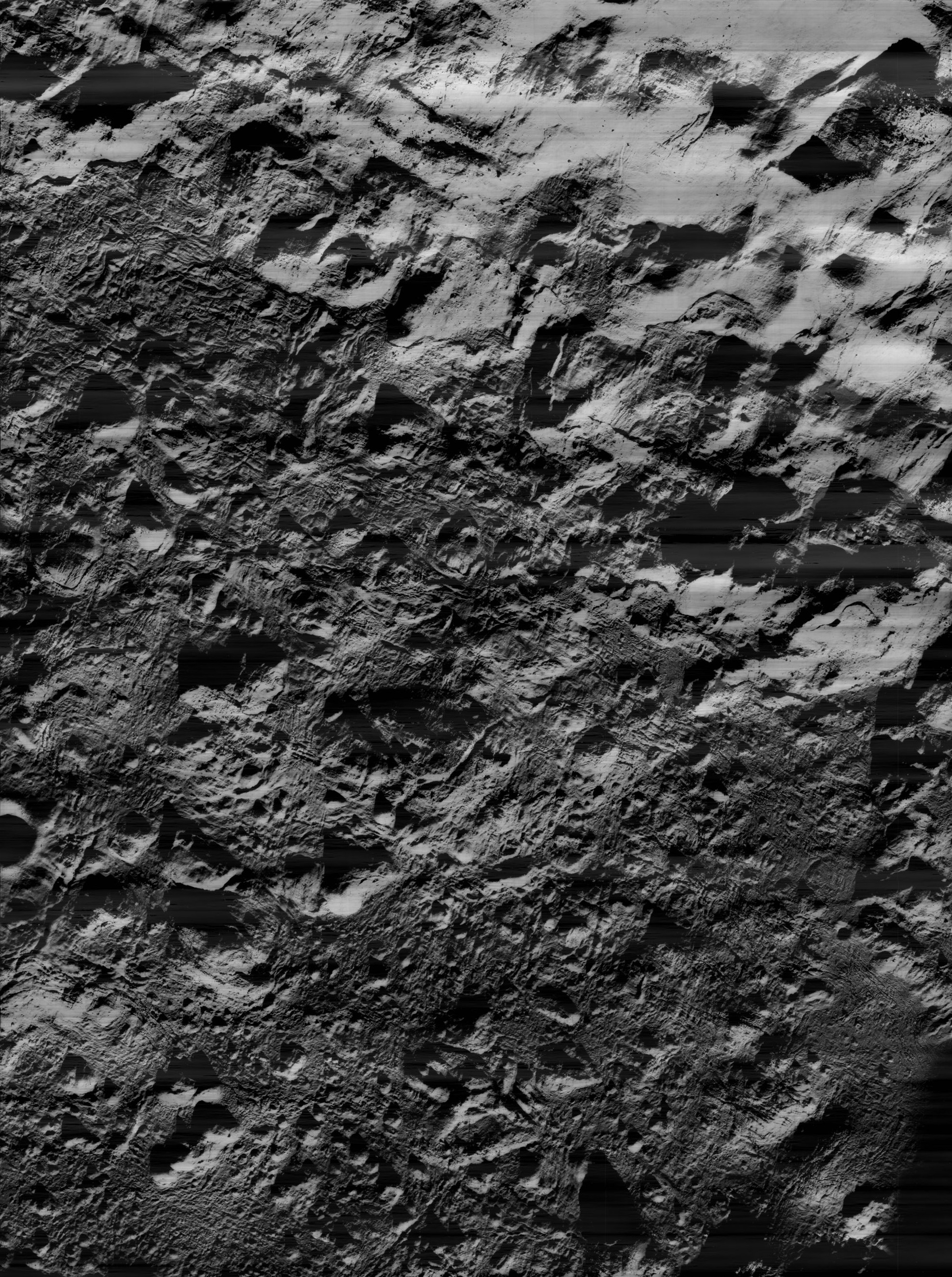
Lunar Orbiter 5 image of the northeastern crater floor, showing irregular surface of cracked impact melt. Illumination is from lower right.

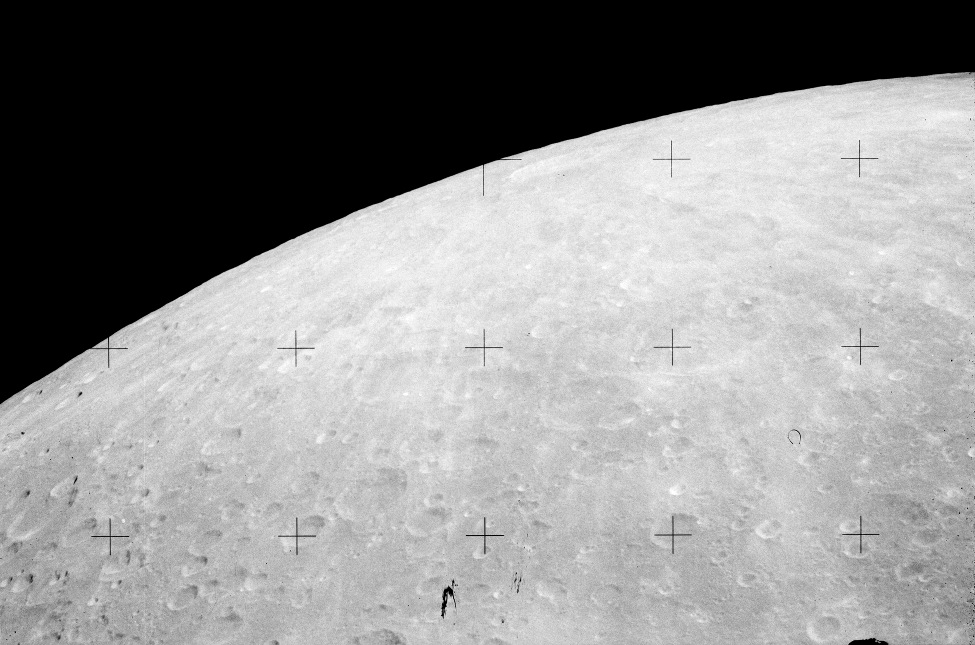
Tycho was not photographed up-close during the Apollo program, but Apollo 15 captured this distant oblique view.

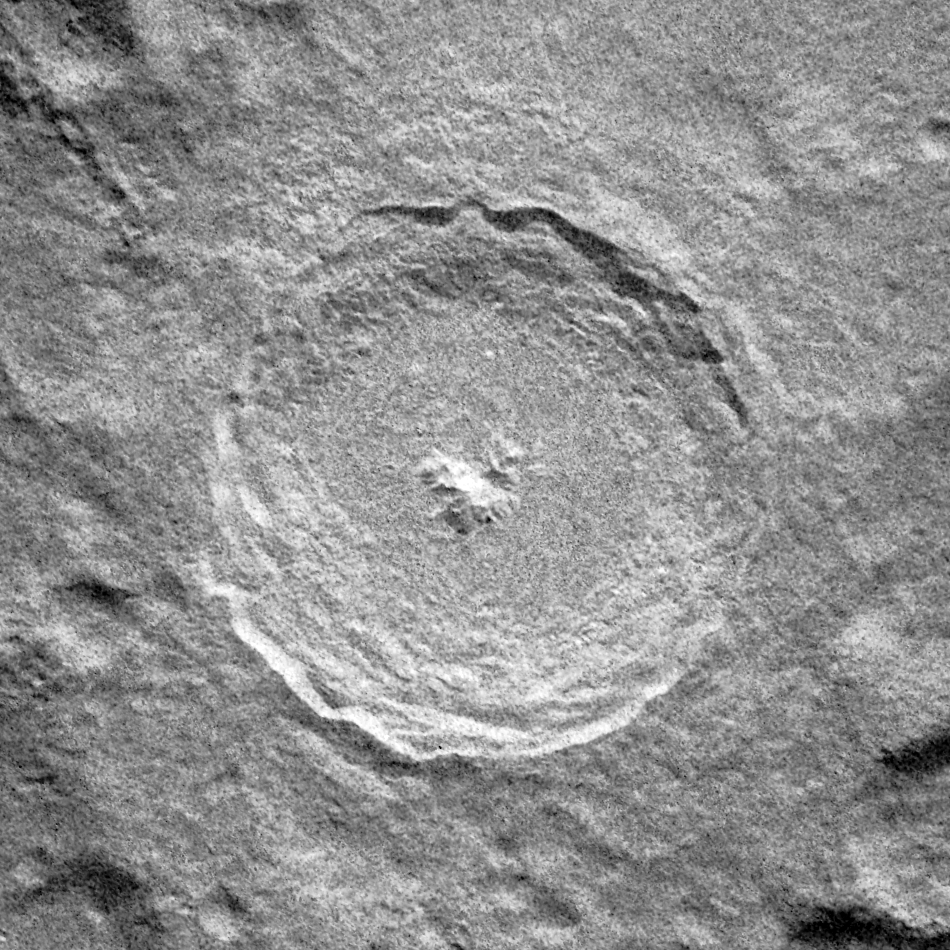
Radar image of Tycho

== See also ==
- 1677 Tycho Brahe, minor planet
- Tycho Brahe (Martian crater)
- Tycho's Nova, bright supernova
