= Encke (crater) =

Lunar impact crater

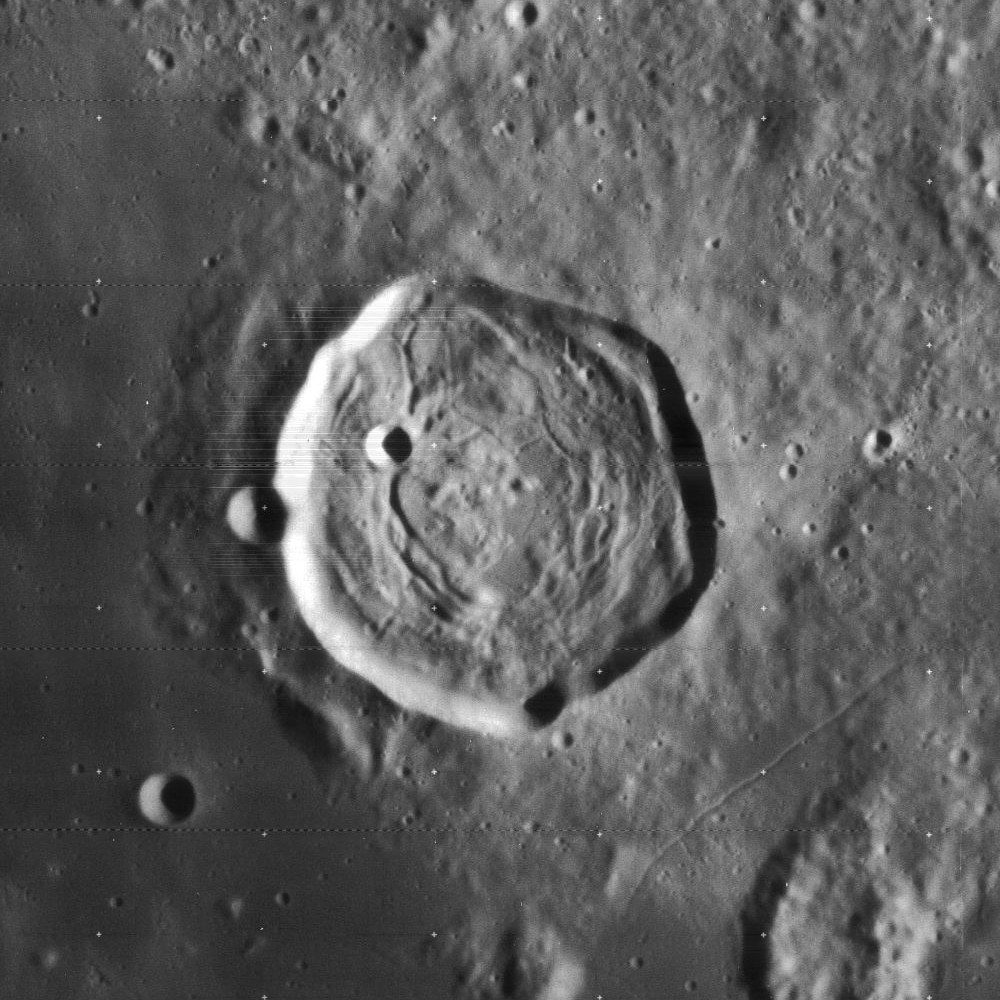
- Lunar Orbiter 4 image
- Coordinates: 4.6°N 36.6°W
- Diameter: 28.27 km (17.57 mi)
- Depth: 0.75 km (0.47 mi)
- Colongitude: 37° at sunrise
- Eponym: Johann F. Encke

Encke is a lunar impact crater that is located on the western edge of the Mare Insularum, to the south-southeast of the crater Kepler. The small crater Kunowsky lies to the east-southeast on the mare. To the west is the small Maestlin crater.

The rim of Encke is low and somewhat polygonal in shape. The tiny craterlet Encke N lies across the western rim. This is a floor-fractured crater with a somewhat uneven surface, and is covered in ray material from the nearby Kepler. Ejecta from Kepler has covered the floor of Encke and deformed its rim. The high albedo of this ejecta makes Encke a bright feature when the Sun is at a high elevation over the lunar surface.

In 2018, a lunar dome was discovered to the south of Encke, designated Encke 1. It has base dimensions of 33 km × 30 km and reaches a peak height of 180 m.

This crater formation is named after German mathematician and astronomer Johann Franz Encke (1791–1865). His name was included in the lunar nomenclature of German astronomer Johann Heinrich von Mädler, published in 1837. Its designation was formally adopted by the International Astronomical Union in 1935.

== Bright unnamed craterlet on the floor of Encke ==
During and after full moon, almost nothing could be observed of crater Encke. A bright unnamed craterlet near the main crater's west-northwestern inner slopes is a guide to get to the location of Encke itself. South of Encke, bright satellite crater Encke B is an eye-catcher. The brightness of the craterlet on the floor of Encke and of satellite crater Encke B is also noticeable on the photographic version of chart LAC 57 (page 114) in The Clementine Atlas of the Moon (Ben Bussey / Paul D. Spudis).

== Satellite craters ==
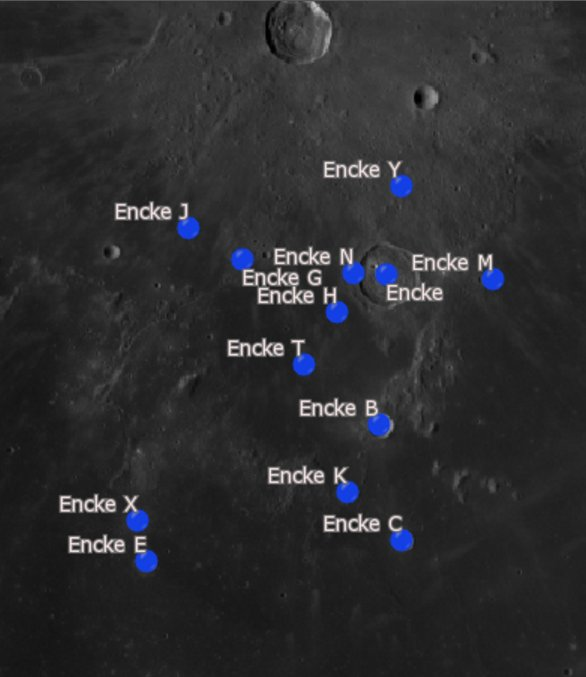
Satellite features of Encke

By convention these features are identified on lunar maps by placing the letter on the side of the crater midpoint that is closest to Encke.

Encke	Latitude	Longitude	Diameter
B	2.4° N	36.8° W	12 km
C	0.7° N	36.4° W	9 km
E	0.3° N	40.1° W	9 km
G	4.8° N	38.8° W	7 km
H	4.0° N	37.3° W	4 km
J	5.2° N	39.5° W	5 km
K	1.4° N	37.2° W	4 km
M	4.5° N	35.1° W	3 km
N	4.6° N	37.1° W	4 km
T	3.4° N	38.0° W	91 km
X	0.9° N	40.3° W	3 km
Y	5.9° N	36.4° W	3 km

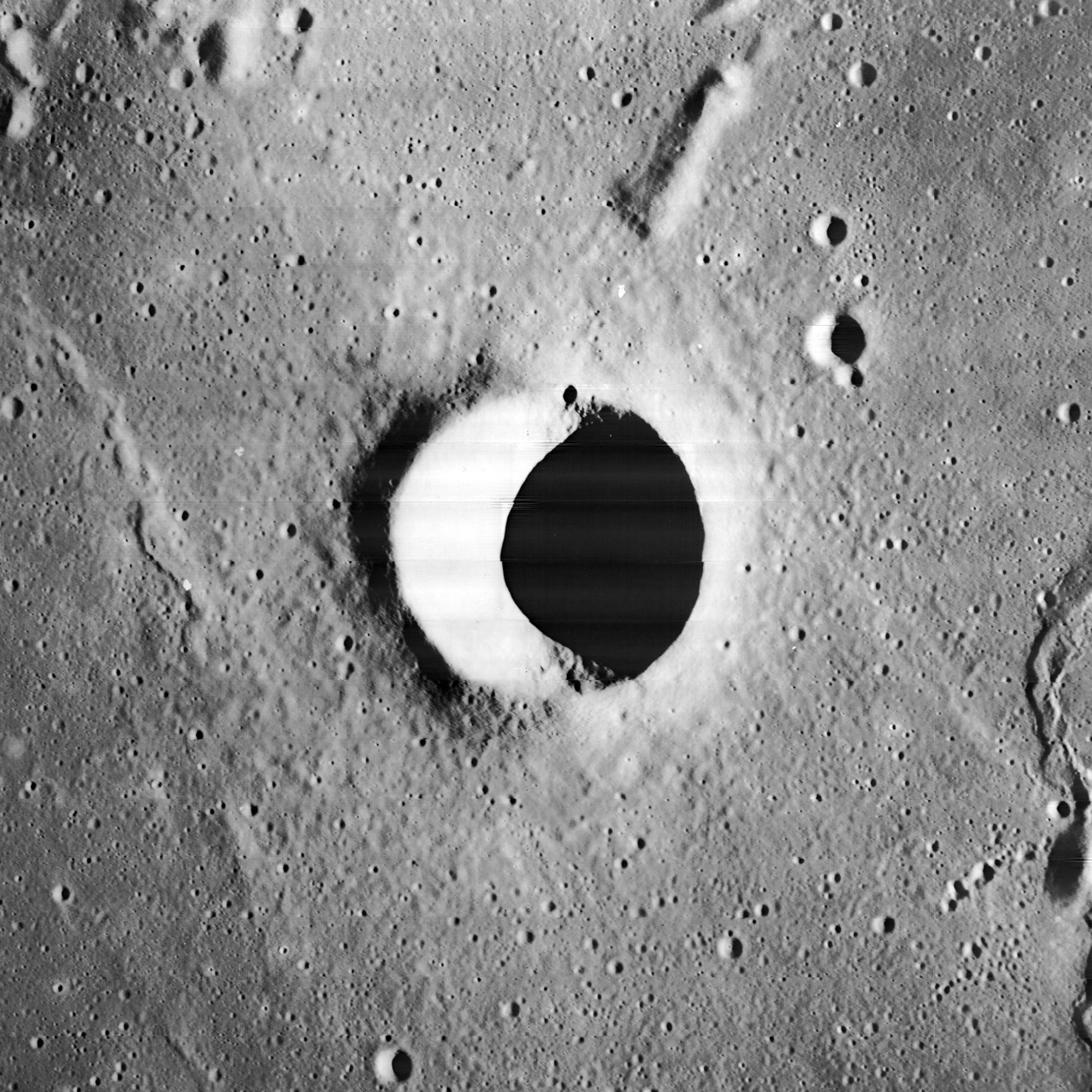
High-resolution Lunar Orbiter 1 image of Encke C

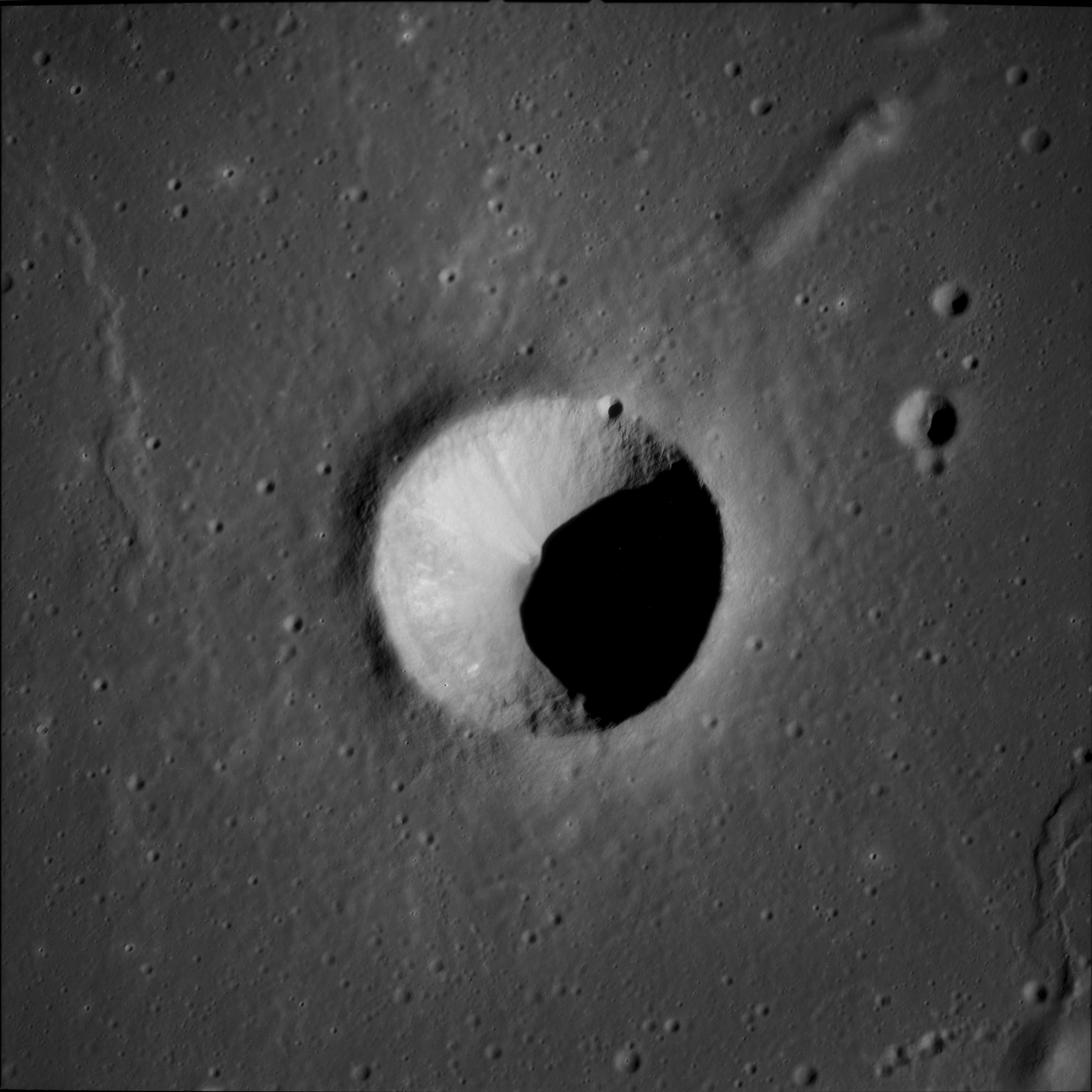
Apollo 12 image of Encke C

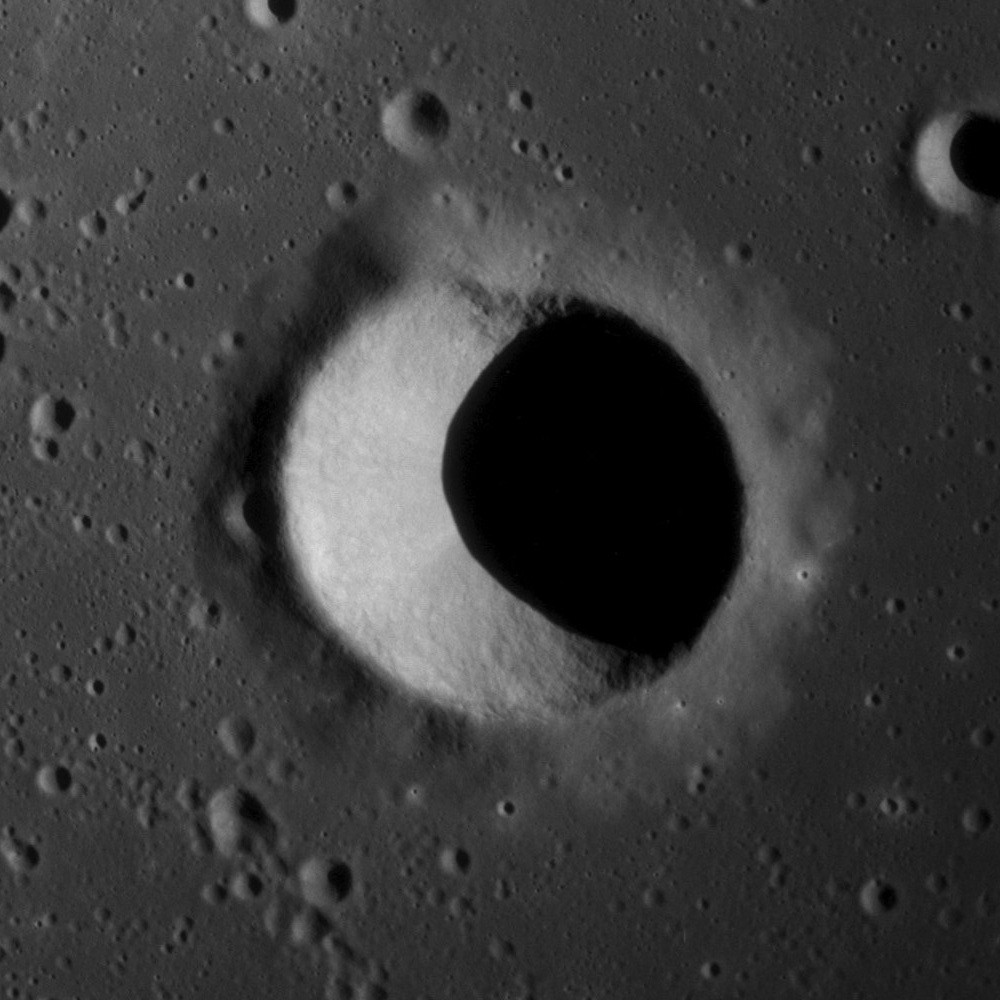
Apollo 12 image of Encke E

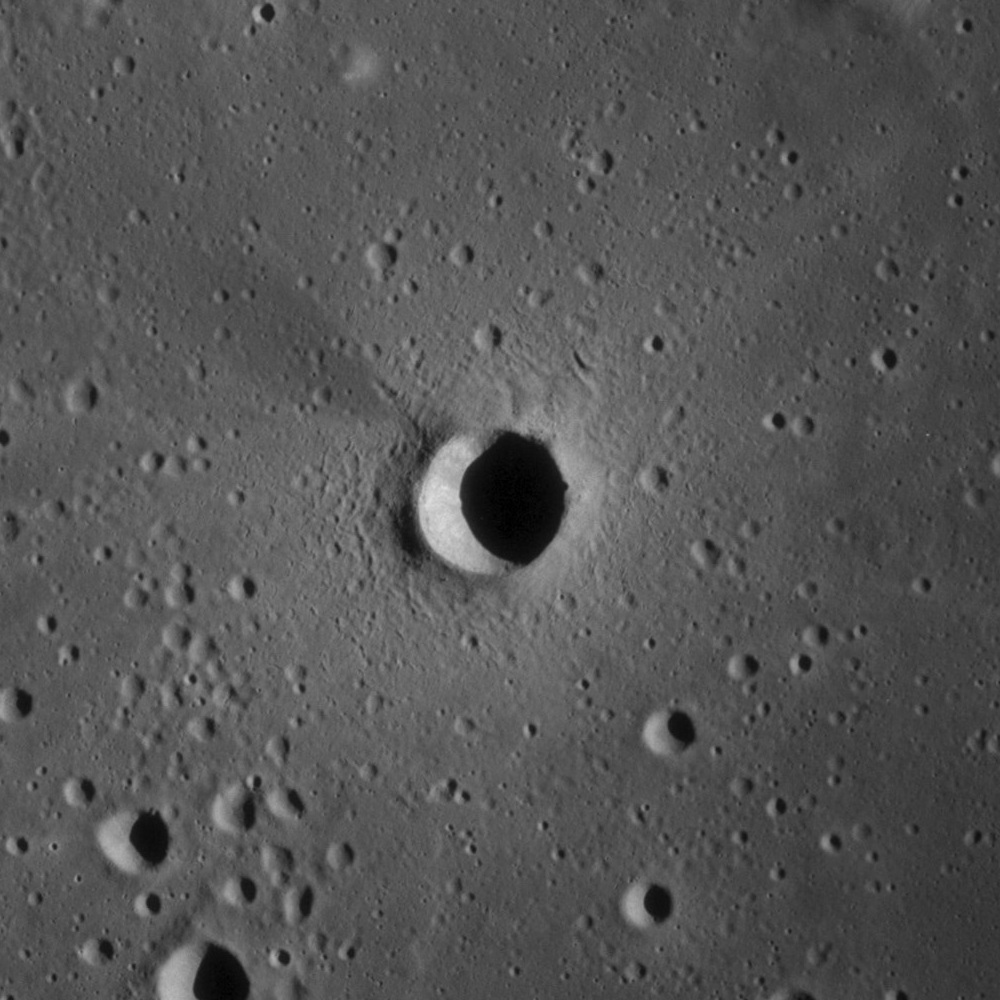
Apollo 12 image of Encke X, with its bright ray system and dark ray northwest of the crater

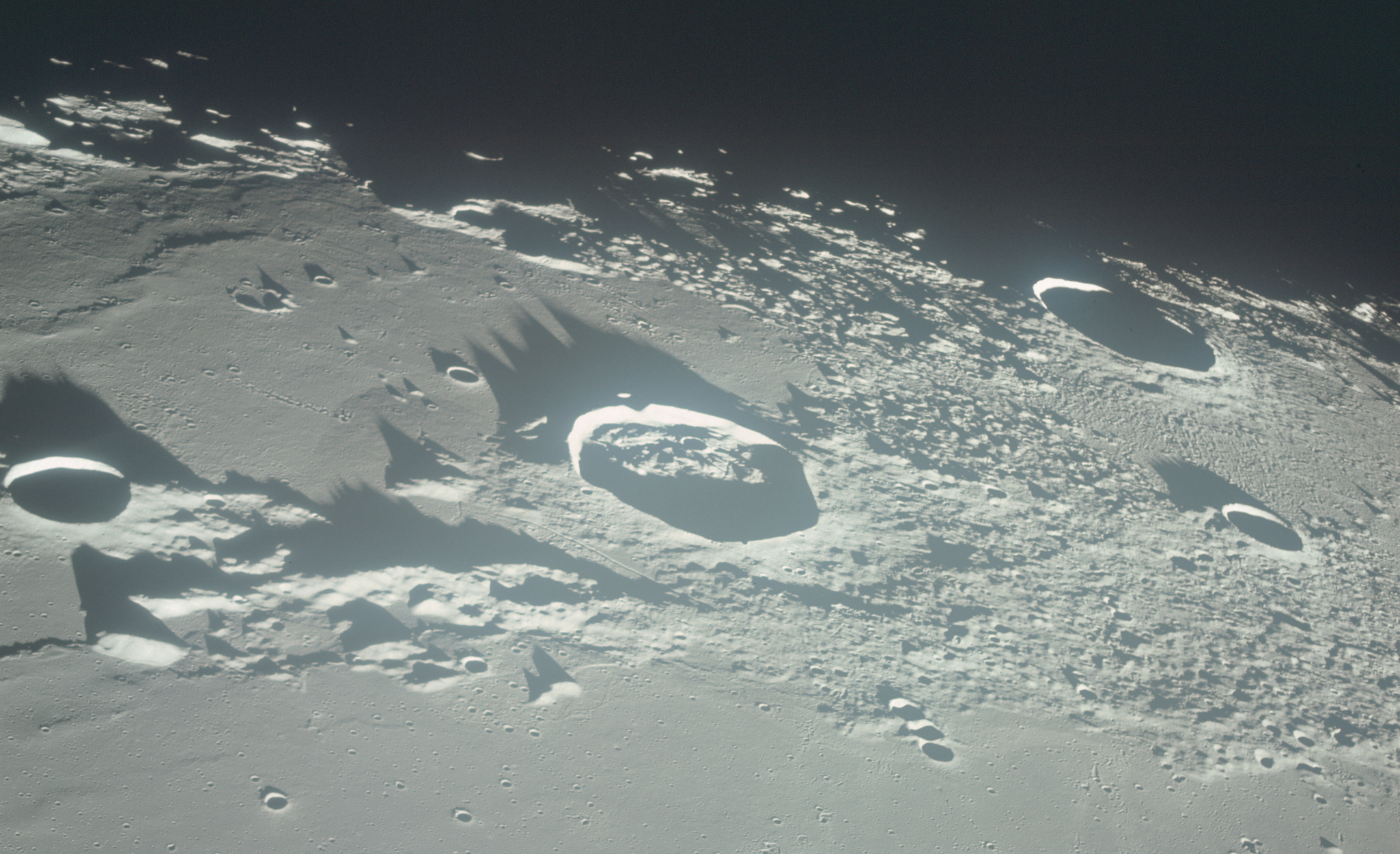
Oblique view from Apollo 12
