= Nathaniel Bliss =

English astronomer

The Reverend Nathaniel Bliss
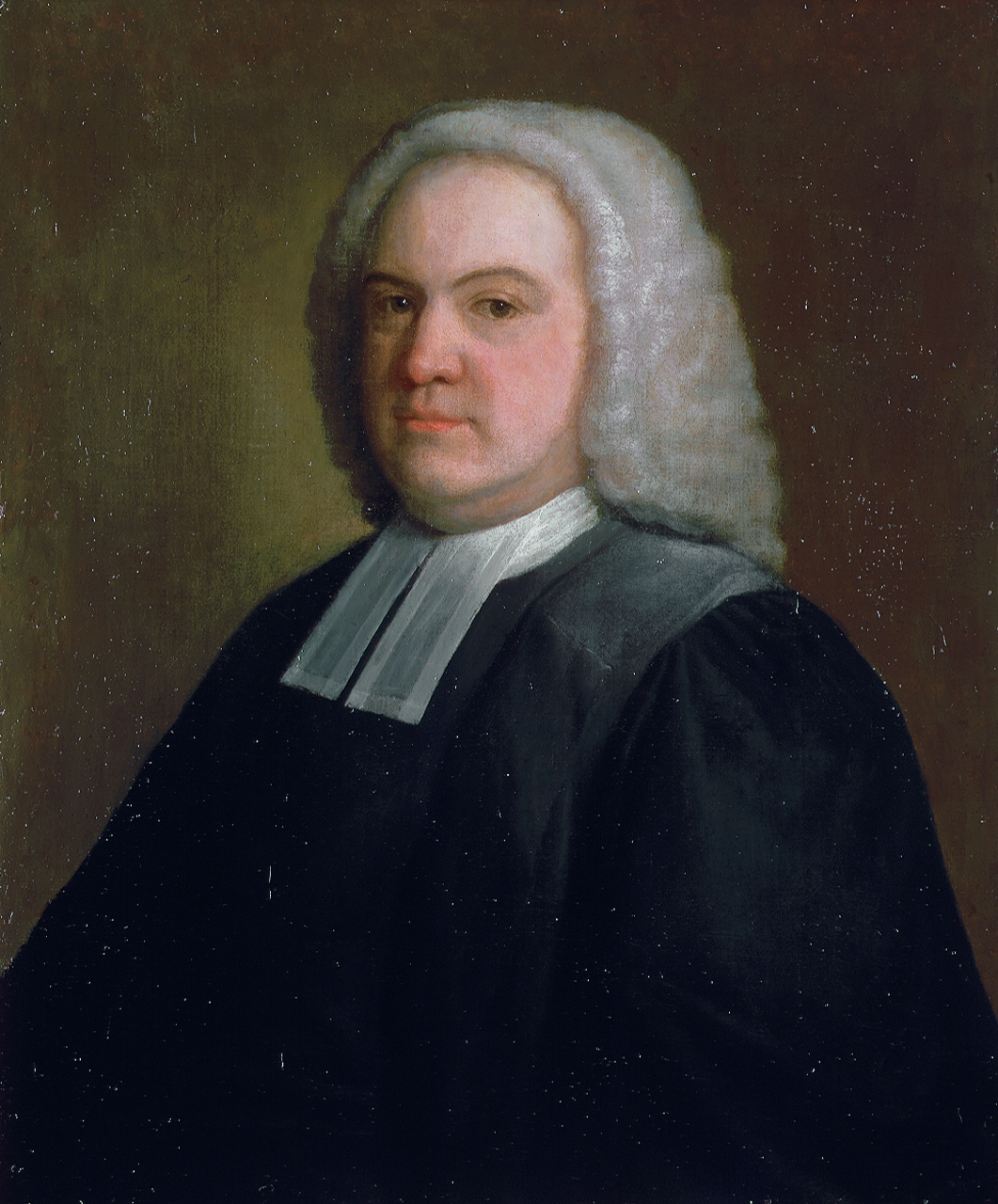
- Portrait of Bliss
- Born: 28 November 1700; Bisley, Gloucestershire, England
- Died: 2 September 1764 (aged 63); Oxford, Oxfordshire, England
- Resting place: St. Margaret's, Lee, South London
- Scientific career
- Fields: Astronomy, mathematics
- Workplaces: Oxford University

4th Astronomer Royal
- In office 1762–1764
- Preceded by: James Bradley
- Succeeded by: Nevil Maskelyne

Nathaniel Bliss (28 November 1700 – 2 September 1764) was an English astronomer who served as the Astronomer Royal from 1762 to 1764. Bliss studied at Oxford University and later became the Savilian Professor of Geometry. He made important meridian observations of a comet and a solar eclipse visible from Greenwich, and many of his observations proved useful in solving the longitude problem, and were bought by the Board of Longitude after his death.

== Life ==
Nathaniel Bliss was born in the Cotswolds village of Bisley in Gloucestershire. His father, also named Nathaniel Bliss, was a clothier. Bliss studied at Pembroke College, Oxford. He graduated B.A. in 1720 and M.A. in 1723, and married shortly afterwards.

In 1736, Bliss became rector of St Ebbe's Church in Oxford. Supported by, among others; the 2nd Earl of Macclesfield (George Parker), Savilian Professor of Astronomy James Bradley and by William Jones, Bliss succeeded Edmond Halley as Savilian Professor of Geometry at Oxford University in February 1742 – being elected a Fellow of the Royal Society in May the same year. As Savilian Professor he lectured courses in arithmetic, algebra, plane and spherical geometry, the use of logarithms and surveying instruments.

In 1762 he succeeded Bradley to become the fourth Astronomer Royal, but held the post for only two years before his unexpected death. He died in Oxford, but was buried close to Edmond Halley in St Margaret's churchyard in Lee in south-east London. As men of independent means, the first four Astronomers Royal including Bliss, were paid only a minimal salary. This situation changed when Nevil Maskelyne succeeded Bliss as Astronomer Royal upon his death – Maskelyne commanded a salary of £350 per annum, permitting him to make the post his main occupation. In 2000 the International Astronomical Union named a crater on the Moon after Bliss, in commemoration of his position as Astronomer Royal.

== Observations ==
George Parker, the Earl of Macclesfield, had established an observatory at Shirburn Castle in Oxfordshire. Working for and with the Earl of Macclesfield, Bliss made meridian observations of a comet approaching the Sun in 1744 at Shirburn Castle and at Greenwich. Bliss worked alongside James Bradley at the Royal Observatory in Greenwich and in June 1761, owing to the poor health of Bradley, he undertook the observations for the transit of Venus.

His assistant at the Royal Observatory was Charles Green, and upon his death, Green continued Bliss's work until the appointment of the next Astronomer Royal. In April 1764 Bliss made observations of an annular (solar) eclipse visible from Greenwich. Many of the observations made by Bliss were considered potentially useful for solving the longitude problem, important for cartography and ocean navigation, and were therefore bought by the Board of Longitude from his widow Elizabeth Bliss (née Hillman). His Greenwich observations were not published until 1805, when they were included as a supplement in an edition by Thomas Hornsby on the observations of Bradley.
