= Kunowsky (lunar crater) =

Crater on the Moon

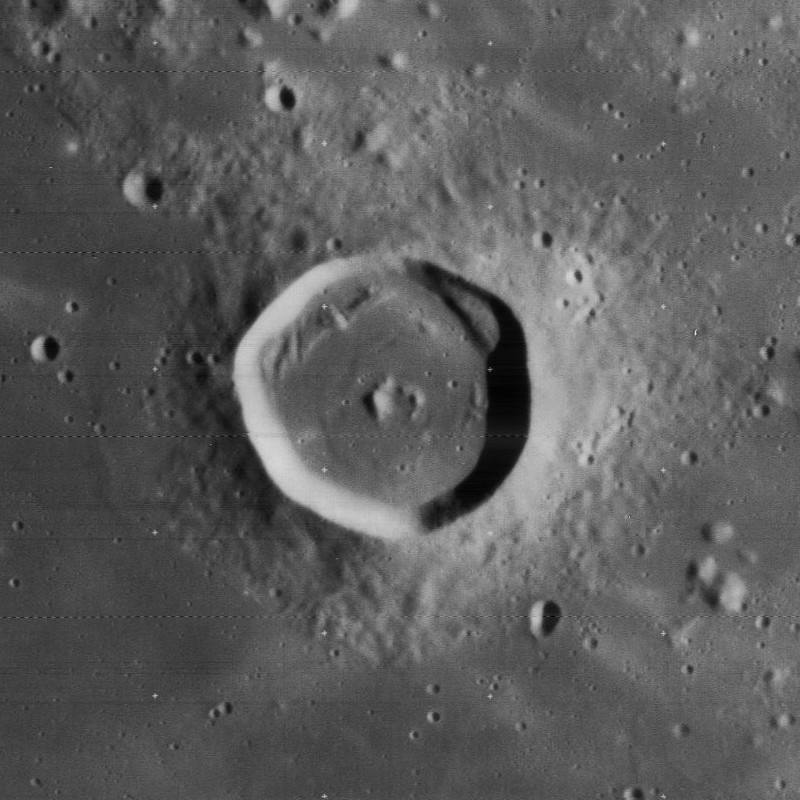
- Lunar Orbiter 4 image
- Coordinates: 3.2°N 32.5°W
- Diameter: 18 km
- Depth: 0.83 km (0.52 mi)
- Colongitude: 33° at sunrise
- Eponym: Georg Karl Friedrich Kunowsky

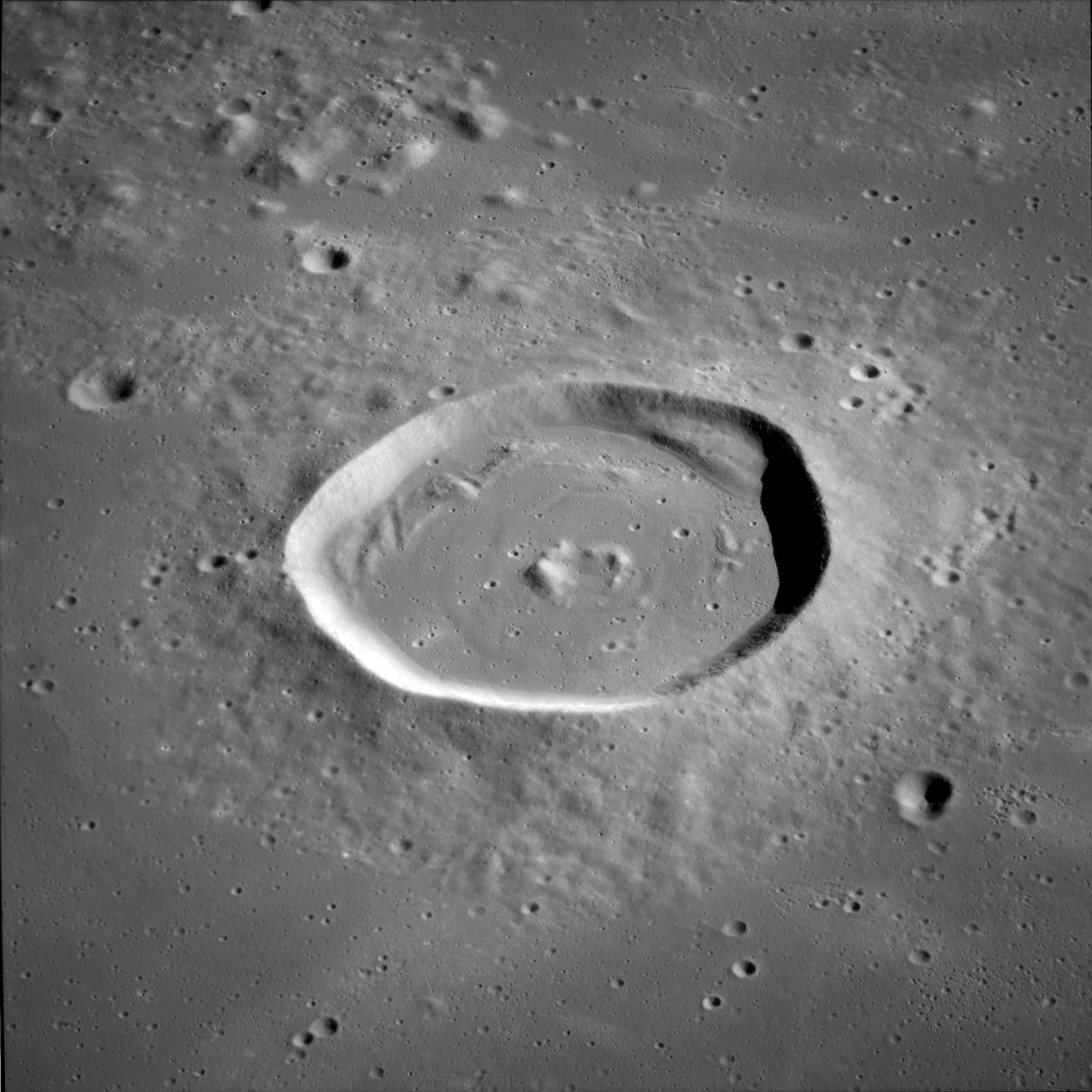
Oblique view of Kunowsky from Apollo 12

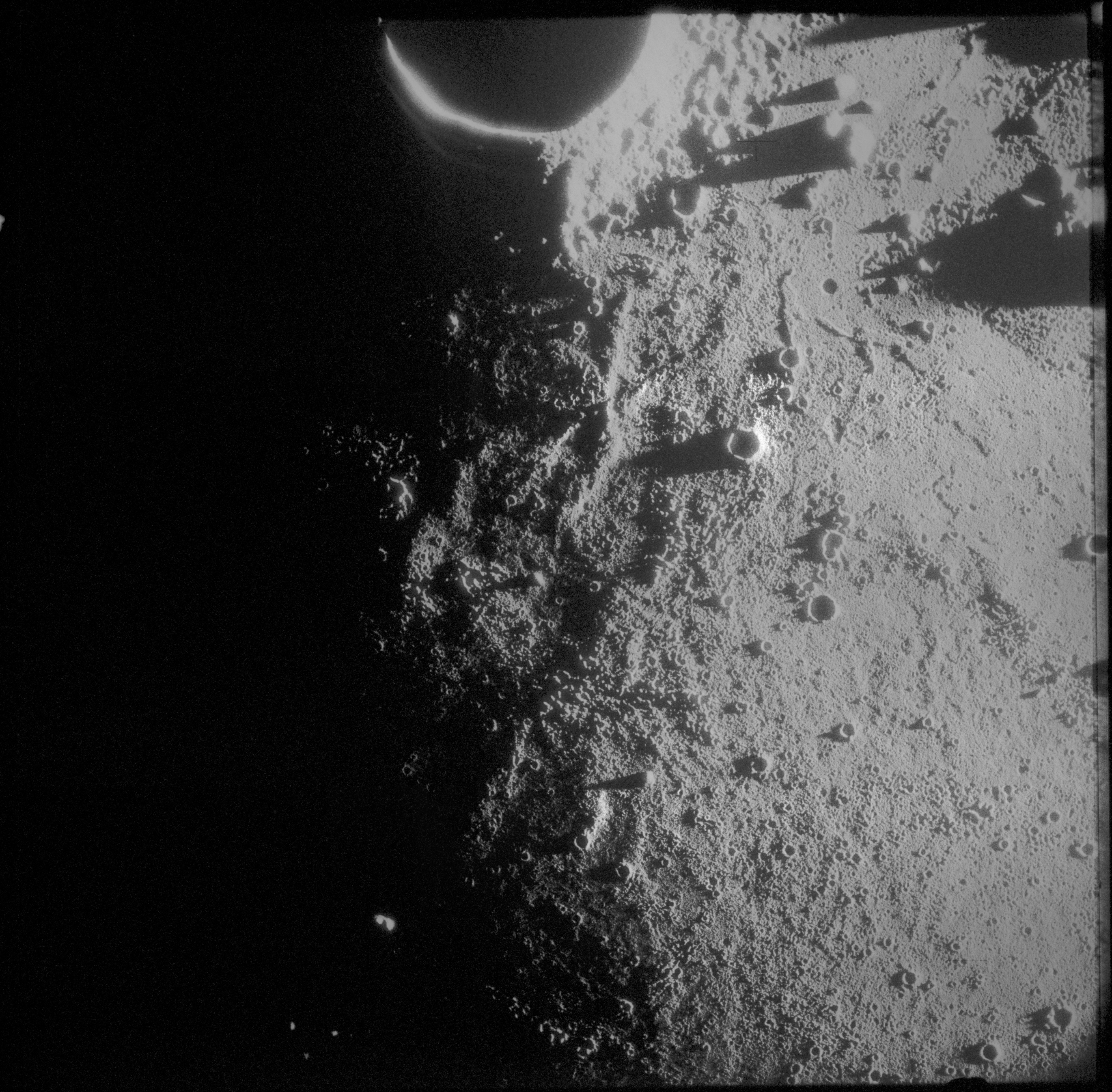
Area south of Kunowsky from Apollo 14

Kunowsky is a small lunar impact crater on the Mare Insularum, in the western half of the Moon's near side. It is named after the German astronomer Georg Karl Friedrich Kunowsky. It lies about one third the distance from Encke to the west-northwest and Lansberg to the east-southeast.

This impact dates to the Imbrian epoch of lunar geological history. The formation is surrounded by lunar mare, and the interior has been flooded by basaltic lava, leaving only a roughly circular rim projecting above the surface. The rim is slender and sharp-edged, with no significant erosion. Apart from a tiny craterlet at the midpoint of the interior floor, this crater has no other significant features. It does lie in a region of the mare where rays from the craters Kepler to the northwest and Copernicus farther to the northeast.

== Satellite craters ==
By convention these features are identified on lunar maps by placing the letter on the side of the crater midpoint that is closest to Kunowsky.

Kunowsky	Latitude	Longitude	Diameter
C	0.2° S	32.4° W	3 km
D	1.5° N	28.8° W	5 km
G	1.7° N	30.7° W	4 km
H	1.1° N	30.0° W	3 km
