= 1677 Tycho Brahe =

Asteroid

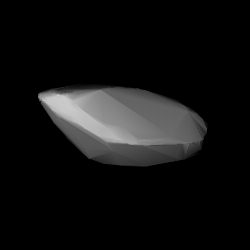
- Tycho Brahe modeled from its lightcurve

Discovery
- Discovered by: Y. Väisälä
- Discovery site: Turku Obs.
- Discovery date: 6 September 1940

Designations
- Named after: Tycho Brahe (Danish astronomer)
- Alternative designations: 1940 RO · 1928 SP; 1935 FL · 1952 QN_{1} 1952 SD_{1} · A916 UA
- Minor planet category: main-belt · (middle); Maria · Eunomia

Orbital characteristics
- Epoch 23 March 2018 (JD 2458200.5)
- Uncertainty parameter 0
- Observation arc: 82.92 yr (30,285 d)
- Aphelion: 2.8037 AU
- Perihelion: 2.2607 AU
- Semi-major axis: 2.5322 AU
- Eccentricity: 0.1072
- Orbital period (sidereal): 4.03 yr (1,472 d)
- Mean anomaly: 130.28°
- Mean motion: 0° 14^{m} 40.56^{s} / day
- Inclination: 14.853°
- Longitude of ascending node: 337.91°
- Argument of perihelion: 318.29°

Physical characteristics
- Mean diameter: 8.90±0.72 km 11.686±0.116 km 11.784±0.093 km 13.26 km (calculated)
- Synodic rotation period: 3.89±0.06 h
- Geometric albedo: 0.21 (assumed); 0.221±0.031; 0.2277±0.0388; 0.466±0.090
- Spectral type: S (Note: Search for Unusual Spectroscopic Candidates Among 40313 minor planets from the 3rd Release of the Sloan Digital Sky Survey Moving Object Catalog (publication). SDSS-MFB (Masi Foglia Binzel) taxonomy (catalog).)
- Absolute magnitude (H): 11.70; 11.9; 12.21±0.04

1677 Tycho Brahe, provisional designation 1940 RO, is a stony Marian asteroid from the central region of the asteroid belt, approximately 12 kilometers (7.5 miles) in diameter. It was discovered on 6 September 1940, by Finnish astronomer Yrjö Väisälä at Turku Observatory in Southwest Finland. The common stony S-type asteroid has a short rotation period of 3.89 hours. It was later named after Tycho Brahe, one of the fathers of astronomy.

== Classification and orbit ==
When applying the hierarchical clustering method to its proper orbital elements, Tycho Brahe is a member of the Maria family (506), a large family of stony asteroids. Based on osculating Keplerian orbital elements, the asteroid has also been classified as a member of the Eunomia family (502), the largest family in the intermediate main belt with more than 5,000 members.

It orbits the Sun in the central main-belt at a distance of 2.3–2.8 AU once every 4.03 years (1,472 days; semi-major axis of 2.53 AU). Its orbit has an eccentricity of 0.11 and an inclination of 15° with respect to the ecliptic. The asteroid was first observed as A916 UA at Bergedorf Observatory in October 1916, extending the body's observation arc by 24 years prior to its official discovery observation at Turku.

== Physical characteristics ==
The asteroid has been characterized as a stony S-type by Pan-STARRS survey, and in the SDSS-MFB (Masi Foglia Binzel) taxonomy, which agree with the overall spectral type for members of the Maria family.

=== Rotation period ===
In July 2012, a rotational lightcurve of Tycho Brahe was obtained by Renata Violante and Martha Leake, that gave a short rotation period of 3.89 hours with a brightness variation of 0.38 magnitude (U=2+).

=== Diameter and albedo ===
According to the survey carried out by NASA's Wide-field Infrared Survey Explorer with its subsequent NEOWISE mission, Tycho Brahe measures 11.78 kilometers in diameter, and its surface has an albedo of 0.221 (revised 2014-figures). The Collaborative Asteroid Lightcurve Link assumes an albedo of 0.21, derived from the family's largest member and namesake, 15 Eunomia, and calculates a diameter of 13.26 kilometers, based on an absolute magnitude of 11.7.

== Naming ==
This minor planet is named for the great Danish-born astronomer Tycho Brahe (1546–1601) an early forerunner and father of modern astronomy. He is known for his unprecedented precise measurements in the pre-telescopic era. The official naming citation was published by the Minor Planet Center on 15 October 1977 (M.P.C. 4236). Brahe is also honored by the prominent crater Tycho in the southern highlands of the Moon and by the Martian crater Tycho Brahe. The bright supernova, SN 1572, is also known as Tycho's Nova.
