= Bliss (crater) =

Lunar impact crater

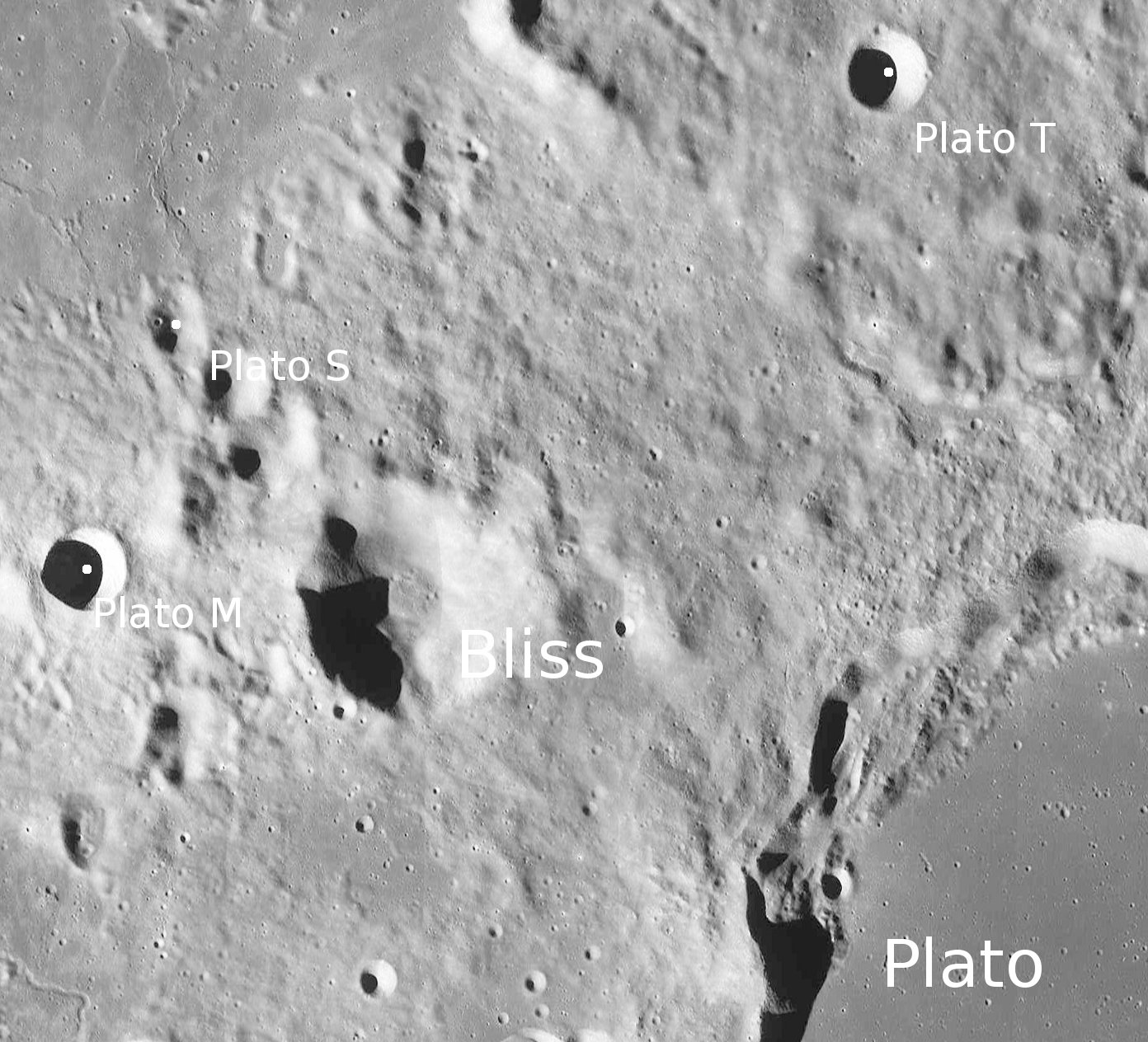
- Coordinates: 53.0°N 13.5°W
- Diameter: 22.85 km (14.20 mi)
- Depth: Unknown
- Colongitude: 14° at sunrise
- Eponym: Nathaniel Bliss

Bliss is small lunar impact crater that is located just to the west of the dark-floored crater Plato. It lies in a region of continental terrain between Mare Imbrium to the south and Mare Frigoris to the north. This crater is bowl-shaped, with a small interior floor at the midpoint and a somewhat eroded outer rim.

In 2000, the IAU named this feature after English astronomer Nathaniel Bliss (1700-1764), the 4th Astronomer Royal. He was the only remaining Astronomer Royal who had not until then received the honor of a named feature or astronomical body. (This revision was announced by the XXIVth general assembly of the IAU, on August 15, 2000.) This new name for the feature was originally suggested by Patrick Moore.

A bulletin announcing the name of this crater described it as a ghost crater that lies between Plato and Mons Piton to the south. However, this was due to a mix-up, and Bliss is actually the crater formerly known as Plato A. The ghost crater between Plato and Mons Piton is sometimes known unofficially as Ancient Newton (not to be confused with the crater Newton).

Immediately west of Bliss, the very bright white and almost lightbluish looking bowl-shaped crater Plato M is a telescopic eye catcher during full moon. With the dark floored walled plain Plato to the east, it shows a remarkable brightness contrast effect. It is also noticeable on the photographic version of chart LAC 12 (page 24) in The Clementine Atlas of the Moon (Ben Bussey / Paul D. Spudis).
