= Kepler (lunar crater) =

Circular depression on the near side of Earth's Moon

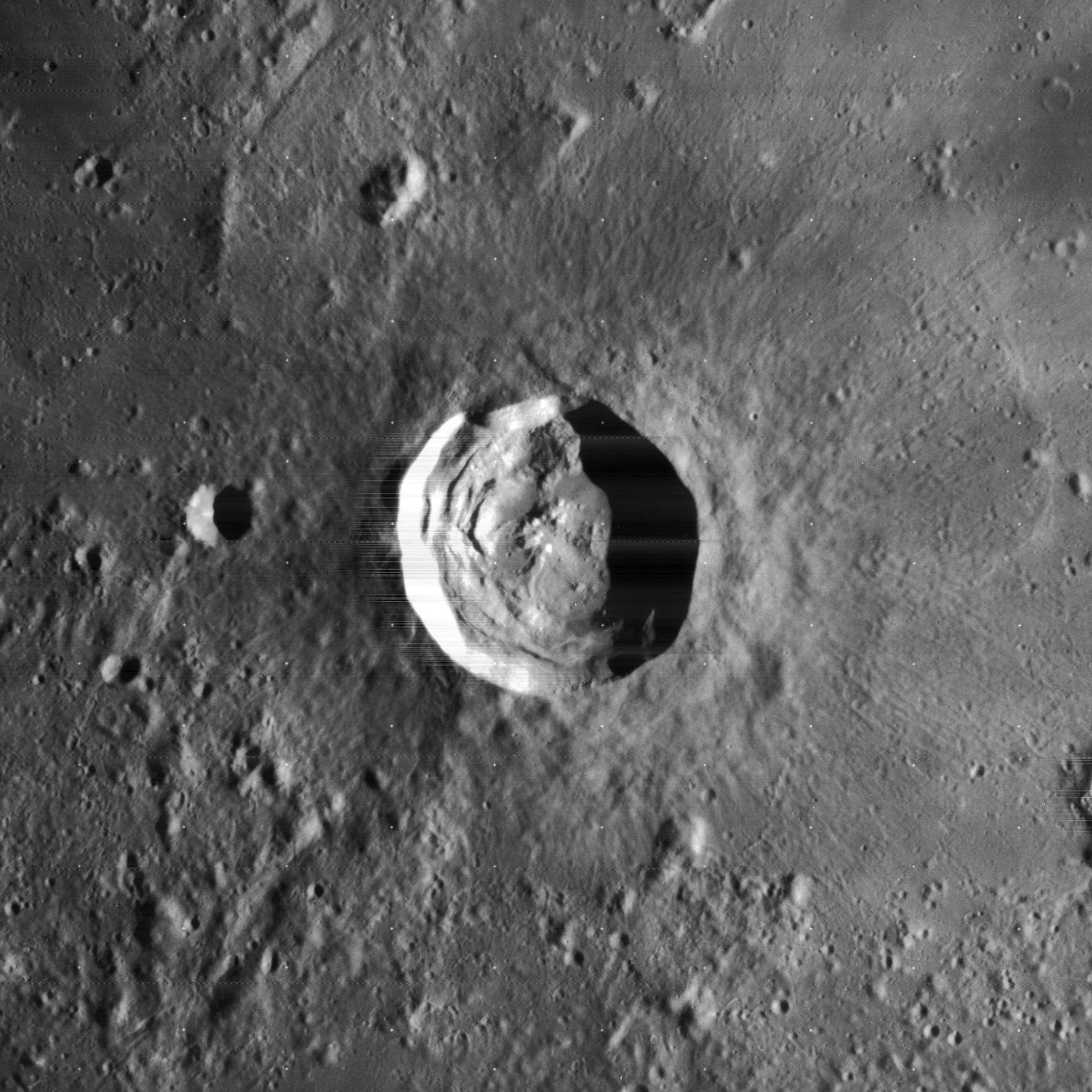
- Lunar Orbiter 4 image
- Coordinates: 8.1°N 38.0°W
- Diameter: 32 km
- Depth: 2.7 km
- Colongitude: 38° at sunrise
- Formation: Copernican
- Eponym: Johannes Kepler

Kepler is a lunar impact crater that lies between the Oceanus Procellarum to the west and Mare Insularum in the east. To the southeast is the crater Encke. Kepler is named for the 17th century German astronomer and mathematician Johannes Kepler. T. W. Webb describes it as having "a very low bright wall", forming the "centre of a great ray-system".

== Description ==
Kepler is most notable for the prominent ray system that covers the surrounding mare. The rays extend for well over 300 kilometers, overlapping the rays from other craters. Kepler has a small rampart of ejecta surrounding the exterior of its high rim. The outer wall is not quite circular, and possesses a slightly polygonal form. The interior walls of Kepler are slumped and slightly terraced, descending to an uneven floor and a minor central rise.

One of the rays from Tycho, when extended across the Oceanus Procellarum, intersects this crater. This was a factor in the choice of the crater's name when Giovanni Riccioli was creating his system of lunar nomenclature, as Kepler used the observations of Tycho Brahe while devising his three laws of planetary motion. On Riccioli's maps, this crater was named Keplerus, and the surrounding skirt of higher albedo terrain was named Insulara Ventorum.

Due to its prominent rays, Kepler is mapped as part of the Copernican System.

== Bright satellite crater Kepler A during and after full moon ==
Immediately east-southeast of Kepler, the bright satellite crater Kepler A is a distinct companion of Kepler during and after full moon. The brightness of both Kepler and Kepler A is noticeable on the photographic version of chart LAC 57 (page 114) in The Clementine Atlas of the Moon (Ben Bussey / Paul D. Spudis).

== Gallery ==
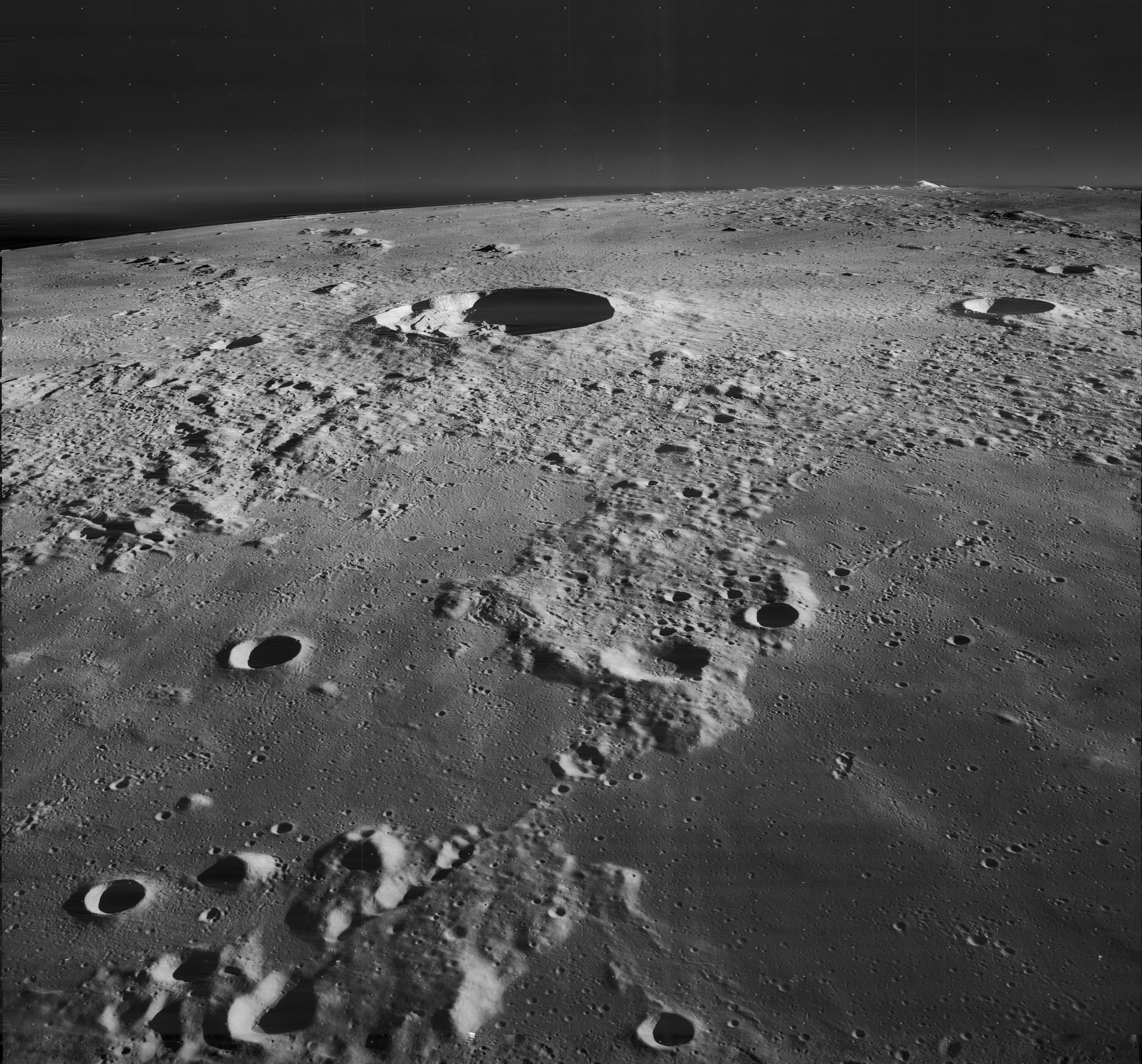
Oblique view from Lunar Orbiter 3

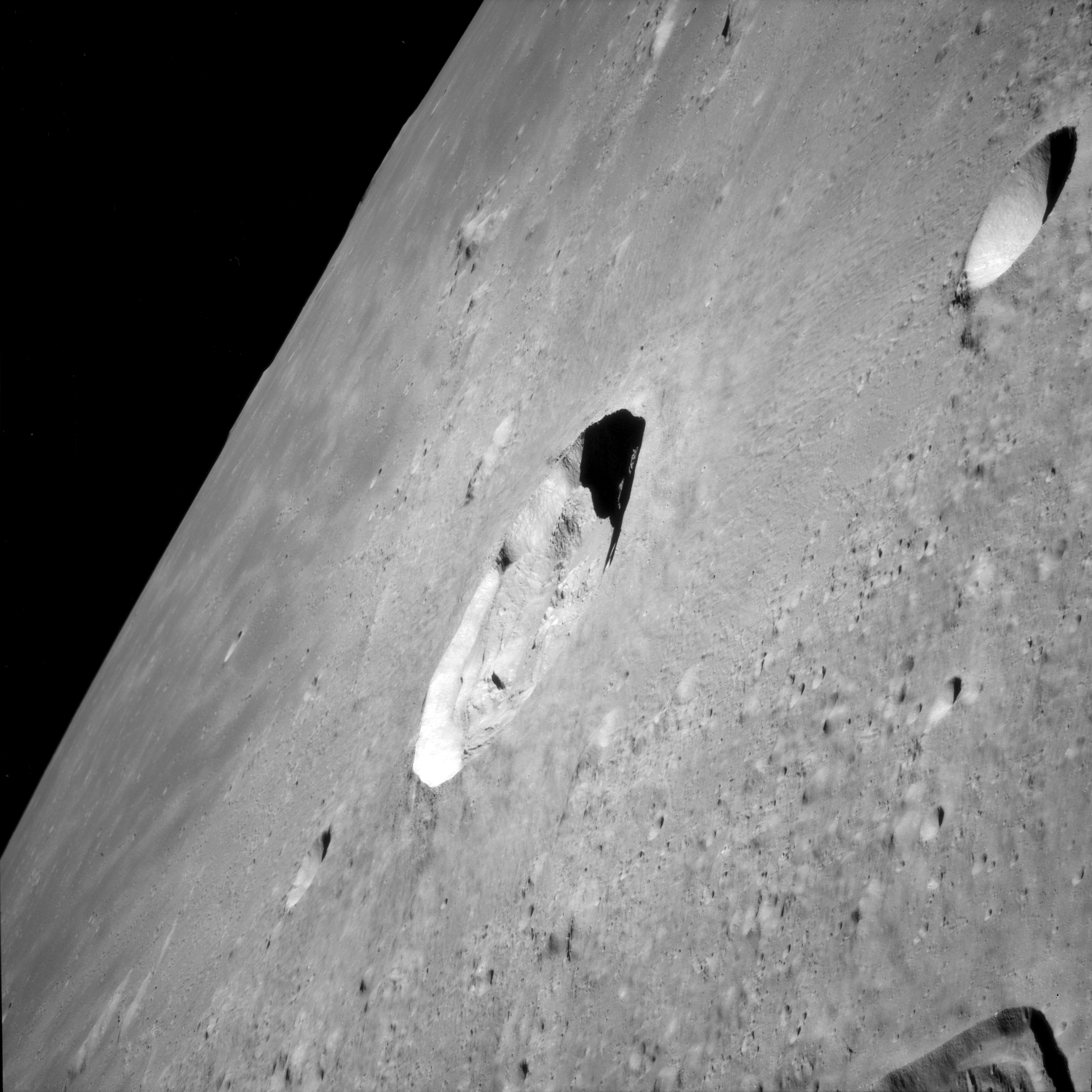
Kepler from Apollo 12

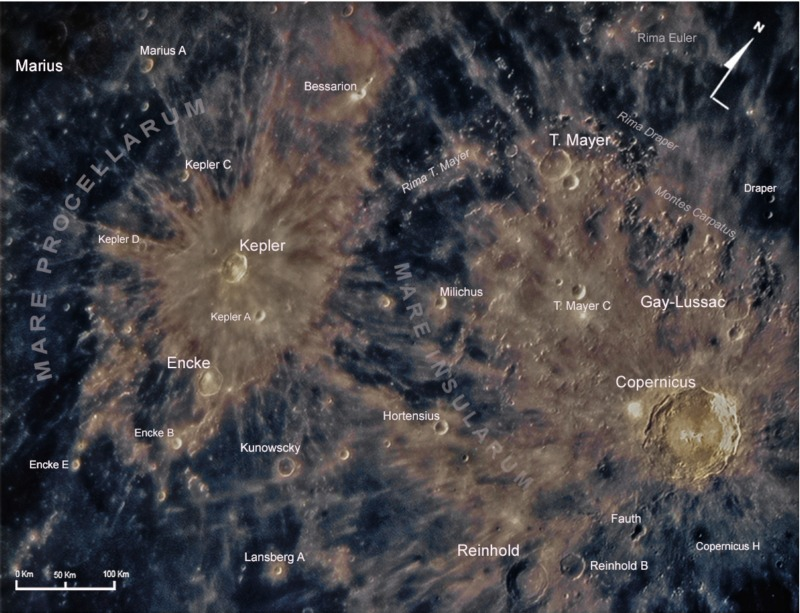
Kepler area with mineral postprocessing (L(DVF)+C -daytime acquisition)

== Satellite craters ==
By convention these features are identified on lunar maps by placing the letter on the side of the crater midpoint that is closest to Kepler.

Latitude	Kepler	Longitude	Diameter
7.2° N	A	36.1° W	11 km
7.8° N	B	35.3° W	7 km
10.0° N	C	41.8° W	11 km
7.4° N	D	41.9° W	10 km
7.4° N	E	43.9° W	6 km
8.3° N	F	39.0° W	7 km
12.2° N	P	34.0° W	4 km
9.0° N	T	34.6° W	3 km

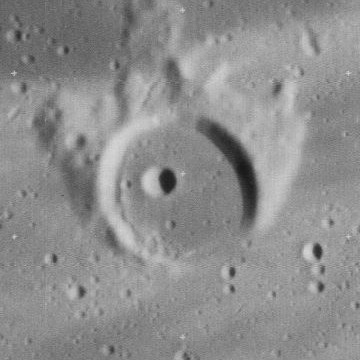
Kepler D crater
