= Georg Karl Friedrich Kunowsky =

German lawyer and astronomer (1786–1846)

Georg Karl Friedrich Kunowsky (3 March 1786 – 23 December 1846) was a German lawyer who was also a talented amateur astronomer.

Born the son of a clergyman in Beuthen, Silesia, Kunowsky studied law and became Justizrat in Berlin.

He made observations of Mars with an 11 cm achromatic refractor telescope made by Joseph von Fraunhofer, which was one of the first times that achromatic refractors were used to observe Mars; these were a notable improvement over the reflectors available to earlier observers.

Like William Herschel before him, he came to the correct conclusion that the visible patches on Mars were surface features rather than clouds or other transient features. Observers like Johann Hieronymus Schröter had come to the opposite conclusion.

Kunowsky made observations of the Moon, discovering a number of lunar rilles. He was also one of a number of astronomers to independently discover the return of Comet Halley in 1835.

Kunowsky died in a railway accident on 23 December 1846 near Kohlfurt (modern day Węgliniec, Poland).

Kunowsky crater on the Moon and another crater on Mars were named in his honour.
