= Jerome Beatty Jr. =

American writer

Jerome M. Beatty Jr. (December 9, 1916 – July 31, 2002) was a twentieth-century American author of children's literature. He was also an accomplished feature writer for magazines. Beatty served in the United States Army, achieving the rank of corporal, and is buried at the Massachusetts National Cemetery.

== Popular books ==
Arguably, Beatty's most popular works are the Matthew and Maria Looney books, a science fiction series for children. Matthew and Maria Looney are a brother and sister who live on the Moon, part of an alien civilization of people who, as it turns out, are a lot like us Earthlings. The series was first published in the early 1960s, at the dawn of the Space Age, and is clearly influenced by that era.

== Selected works ==
=== Books ===
- Matthew Looney's Voyage to the Earth (1961)
- Matthew Looney's Invasion of the Earth (1965)
- Matthew Looney in the Outback (1969)
- Matthew Looney and the Space Pirates (1972)
- Maria Looney on the Red Planet (1977)
- Maria Looney and the Cosmic Circus (1978)
- Maria Looney and the Remarkable Robot (1978)
- Bob Fulton's Amazing Soda-Pop Stretcher: An International Spy Story (1963)
- Bob Fulton's Terrific Time Machine: An Adventure in Space and Time (1963)
- Sex Rears Its Lovely Head: Cartoons edited from family magazines Bantam Books (1956)
- Show Me The Way To Go Home (1959)
- The Girls We Leave Behind (1963)
- 1 O'Clock in the Button Factory (1964)
- Double Take (1971)
- The Tunnel to Yesterday
- Sheriff Stonehead and the Teen-Age Termites (1970)
- From New Bedford to Siberia : A Yankee Whaleman in the Frozen North (1977)

=== Periodicals ===
- "Sweetheart of the A.E.F.", feature story on Rita Hayworth, The American Magazine, December 1942
- "Collier’s Credits", Colliers Sep 17 1954, Jul 22 1955, Aug 19 1955
- "The Shuddering Truth About Pipe Smokers", Pageant Dec 1956
- "White House Pipeline", Cavalier Feb 1962
- "Yes, Virginia, There Is a South Pole Santa Claus", Colliers Dec 23 1955
- "Hanging Up On Hemingway", The night Ernest talked on—no one knows how long, [Esquire Magazine] Feb 1967
- Have You Ever Wondered? Macfadden Books (1962)
