= Matthew Looney =

Title character in a series of children's science fiction books by Jerome Beatty Jr

Illustration by Gahan Wilson

Matthew Looney is the title character in a series of four science fiction books for children by Jerome Beatty Jr (1916—2002). Matthew's sister Maria Looney is the title character in Beatty's three subsequent books. The entire Looney series is illustrated by the renowned cartoonist Gahan Wilson.

== Series overview ==
The Matthew Looney books chronicle the adventures of a brother and sister, Matthew and Maria Looney, who live in the town of Crater Plato, on the Moon. In Beatty's stories, the inhabitants of the Moon are a fully developed non-human civilization. Beatty's fictional Moon inhabitants are an indigenous species, living on the Moon without the assistance of spacesuits, "breathing" vacuum instead of air. A recurring theme in the books is Matthew's desire to know more about outer space, especially the Earth. At the beginning of the series, he looks up in the sky at the Earth and wonders if anyone is living on it.

Similar to most child characters in children's literature, the Looney kids must deal with parents, friends, and rivals, along with the normal array of school-age joys and concerns. Their father works in the "powder factory," but Matthew is captivated by the notion of an exciting career in the military like his uncle, Rear Admiral Looney. Maria, his younger sister, prefers playing sports after school and getting in trouble with her best friend and rival, Hester.

During their adventures, the Looney kids face space pirates, a war between the Moon and Mars, the "discovery" of life on Earth, and the invasion of an Earth circus.

== Influence of the "Space Age" ==
Jerome Beatty Jr began his series in the early 1960s, at the dawn of the Space Age, when 20th-century children were especially fascinated by the likelihood of space missions and adventures to the Moon in their own lifetimes. The NASA Apollo Program figures into the stories as well. For example, in one episode, Matthew witnesses the Earthlings' first feeble attempts to "explore" the Moon.

Beatty uses Matthew Looney’s curiosity about the Earth and his desire to embark on voyages of discovery as a literary device. His readers identify with Matthew Looney because of their own yearning for adventure and fascination with space exploration. Kids in the 1960s, growing up in a time when human beings were first exploring space, would see themselves in the young Moon-boy who was growing up in his own era of early space exploration.

== Publication status ==
Although the Looney books were fairly popular through the 1980s, commonly enjoyed by grade-school and preadolescent children, they are currently out of print. The most recent publisher of the series, Avon Camelot, was purchased by HarperCollins in 1999. The Looney series still enjoys a steady readership in the public library system. Used copies for purchase remain in circulation via the internet.

== Series titles ==
- Matthew Looney's Voyage to the Earth (1961) ISBN 978-1095788752
- Matthew Looney's Invasion of the Earth (1965) ISBN 978-0201092738
- Matthew Looney in the Outback (1969) ISBN 978-0380008476
- Matthew Looney and the Space Pirates (1972) ISBN 978-0380008483
- Maria Looney on the Red Planet (1977) ISBN 978-0380017294
- Maria Looney and the Cosmic Circus (1978) ISBN 978-0380403110
- Maria Looney and the Remarkable Robot (1978) ISBN 978-0380432325
