= William Whipple (disambiguation) =

William Whipple (1730–1785) was a Founding Father, signatory of the United States Declaration of Independence, and a brigadier general in the Continental Army

Other people named William Whipple include:

- William Denison Whipple (1826–1902), brigadier general in the Union army during the American Civil War
- William Whipple Jr. (1909–2007), brigadier general in the U.S. army
- William M. Whipple (?–1918), member of the Arizona House of Representatives, father of W. D. Whipple
- W. D. Whipple, state senator from Arizona, son of William M. Whipple

== See also ==
- William Whipple House, birthplace of the Founding Father
- William Whipple Robinson
- William Whipple Warren (1825–1853)
- General Whipple (disambiguation)
- Whipple (surname)
- Whipple (disambiguation)
