= General Whipple =

General Whipple may refer to:

- Amiel Weeks Whipple (1817–1863), Union Army brigadier general, and briefly major general
- William Whipple (1731–1785), Continental Army brigadier general
- William Denison Whipple (1826–1902), Union army brigadier general
- William Whipple Jr. (1909–2007), U.S. Army brigadier general

== See also ==
- Whipple (surname)
- Whipple (disambiguation)
- William Whipple (disambiguation)
