= Gore (crater) =

Crater on the Moon

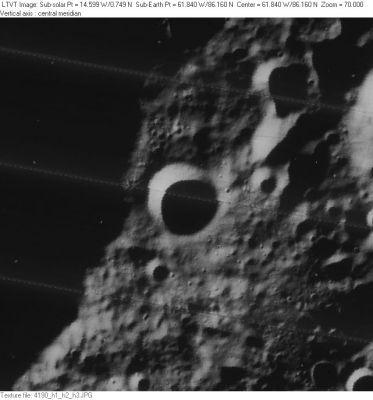
- Coordinates: 86.1°N 61.8°W
- Diameter: 8.5 km
- Depth: 1.81 km (1.12 mi)
- Eponym: John Ellard Gore

Gore is a lunar impact crater located on the lunar near side near the northern pole. Major nearby features include Florey crater (diameter of 54.7 km) to the Southeast, Peary crater (diameter of 73 km) to the East-Northeast, and Byrd crater (diameter of 94 km) to the Southeast. The crater was adopted and named after John Ellard Gore by the IAU in 2009.
