= Whipple =

Whipple may refer to:

== People ==
- Whipple (surname), a list of people with the surname
- Whip Jones (1909–2001), American ski industry pioneer, founder, developer and original operator of the Aspen Highlands ski area in Aspen, Colorado
- Whipple Van Buren Phillips (1833–1904), American businessman, grandfather of H. P. Lovecraft, whom he raised

== Fictional characters ==
- Mr. Whipple, in American television ads for Charmin toilet paper
- Whipple Jones (The Bold and the Beautiful), in the American soap opera The Bold and the Beautiful
- Wallace V. Whipple, protagonist of "The Brain Center at Whipple's", a 1964 episode of the American television series The Twilight Zone
- "Whipple the Happy Dragon", a character in a 2017 episode of Islands, an animated miniseries

== Places in the United States ==
- Whipple, Ohio, an unincorporated community
- Whipple, West Virginia, an unincorporated community
- Whipple Lakes, Crow Wing County, Minnesota
- Whipple Lake, Clearwater County, Minnesota
- Whipple Mountains, a mountain range in southeastern California
- Whipple Run, a stream in Ohio
- Whipple Building, a federal government building near Minneapolis, Minnesota

== In the military ==
- USS Whipple, three U.S. Navy ships named after Abraham Whipple
- Fort Whipple, Arizona, a fort established in 1863 in Arizona Territory near Prescott
- Fort Whipple, historical name for the United States Army's Fort Myer

== Science, technology and medicine ==
- Whipple (crater), a crater on the Moon
- 36P/Whipple, a periodic comet discovered by Fred Whipple
- Whipple (spacecraft), a proposed space telescope in the 2010s
- Fred Lawrence Whipple Observatory, an astronomical observatory in Arizona, United States
- Whipple Museum of the History of Science, a science museum of the University of Cambridge
- Whipple shield, a type of hypervelocity impact shield
- Whipple procedure, the common name for a pancreaticoduodenectomy, a surgery to remove the head of the pancreas due to pancreatic cancer or other disease along with some other organs

== See also ==
- Whipple's disease, a rare bacterial disease (first described by George Whipple)
- Whipple procedure, surgical removal of pancreatic cancer (devised by Allen Whipple)
- Whipple's triad, conditions necessary for proving a diagnosis of hypoglycemia (by Allen Whipple)
