= Second inauguration of Ulysses S. Grant =

22nd United States presidential inauguration

Second presidential inauguration of Ulysses S. Grant
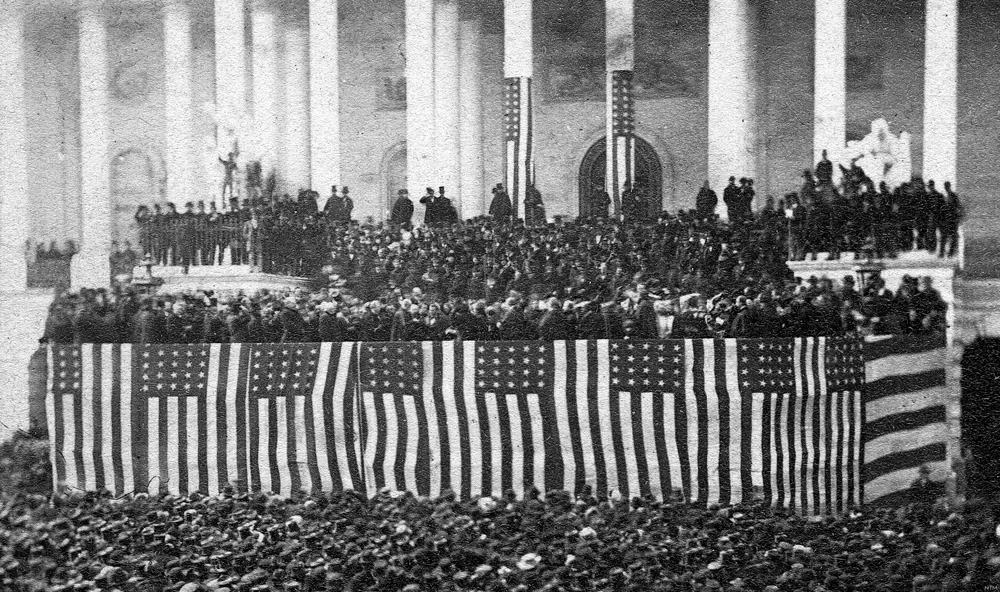
- Grant taking the oath of office.
- Date: March 4, 1873; 153 years ago
- Location: United States Capitol, Washington, D.C.
- Participants: Ulysses S. Grant; 18th president of the United States — Assuming office Salmon P. Chase; Chief Justice of the United States — Administering oath Henry Wilson; 18th vice president of the United States — Assuming office Schuyler Colfax; 17th vice president of the United States — Administering oath

The second inauguration of Ulysses S. Grant as president of the United States was held on Tuesday, March 4, 1873, at the East Portico of the United States Capitol in Washington, D.C. This was the 22nd inauguration and marked the commencement of the second and final four-year term of Ulysses S. Grant as president and the only term of Henry Wilson as vice president. Chief Justice Salmon P. Chase administered the presidential oath of office. This was one of the coldest inaugurations in U.S. history with 16 °F (−9 °C) at noon, and the inaugural ball ended early when the food froze. Vice President Wilson died 2 years, 263 days into this term, and the office remained vacant since there was no constitutional provision to fill an intra-term vice-presidential vacancy until the Twenty-fifth Amendment in 1967.

== Inaugural ceremony and parade ==
The day's festivities included the inauguration ceremony, a parade review, a fireworks display, and an inaugural ball. Prior to the parade Grant was received by a custom made black carriage and was greeted by three senators who were already aboard. Grant's wife Julia, followed in a separate carriage, accompanied by Vice President-elect Henry Wilson. It was the coldest March inauguration in history, with temperatures of sixteen degrees and an estimated windchill of -15. (Even with the advent of January presidential inaugurations beginning in 1937, Grant's Second Inauguration remains the second-coldest on record, trailing only Ronald Reagan's Second Inaugural in 1985. The 1985 inauguration was moved indoors due to the frigid temperatures.) The parade largely consisted of military companies and bands. The grand Marshal of the inauguration ceremony and parade was William Farquhar Barry, with William Denison Whipple as assistant grand marshal and William Dickson as deputy grand marshal.

After the parade, Chief Justice Salmon P. Chase administered the presidential oath of office. Grant requested the Bible be open to Isaiah, chapter 11, a chapter about "Christ's Peaceable Kingdom", which was symbolic to Grant's view of post-war America. The passage also referred to the stem of Jesse, a tribute to Grant's father, Jesse Root Grant. At the ceremony, Grant sat in the same chair that George Washington used in the 1789 ceremony. Grant's inaugural address began with a defense of his policy in the south, gave a statement of support for black freedmen, and celebrated the success of reconstruction. He also praised technological advances and spoke against his political enemies. Grant's address was the first time he endorsed Senator Charles Sumner's proposed Civil Rights Bill, with Grant endorsing civil rights for blacks.

== Inaugural ball ==
In 1873, the District of Columbia enacted a law guaranteeing equal treatment at businesses for black and white customers, and Grant's White House set an example, with black congressmen attending the inaugural ball and black guests dancing together with white guests. This did not pass without criticism in the press. The ball was adorned with a $1,000 floral arrangement contributed by Kate Chase Sprague, daughter of chief justice Chase. The ball was catered by Maison Torrilhon, a restaurant run by Jean-Georges Torrilhon.

The inaugural ball was not successful. It was held in a temporary structure built on Judiciary Square. The building was not heated, and this was disastrous. Guests danced in their coats, desserts congealed and drinks froze, musicians struggled to play, and canaries which were to be part of the entertainment died in their cages. The room was designed for 6,000 guests, but only half that number attended. The president and cabinet arrived at 11:30 P.M. but stayed for a short time before moving on to a private, heated room for supper and by midnight the event was over.

The inaugural series continued when a masquerade ball was held on March 5 in the ball building, although the president did not attend.

== Gallery ==
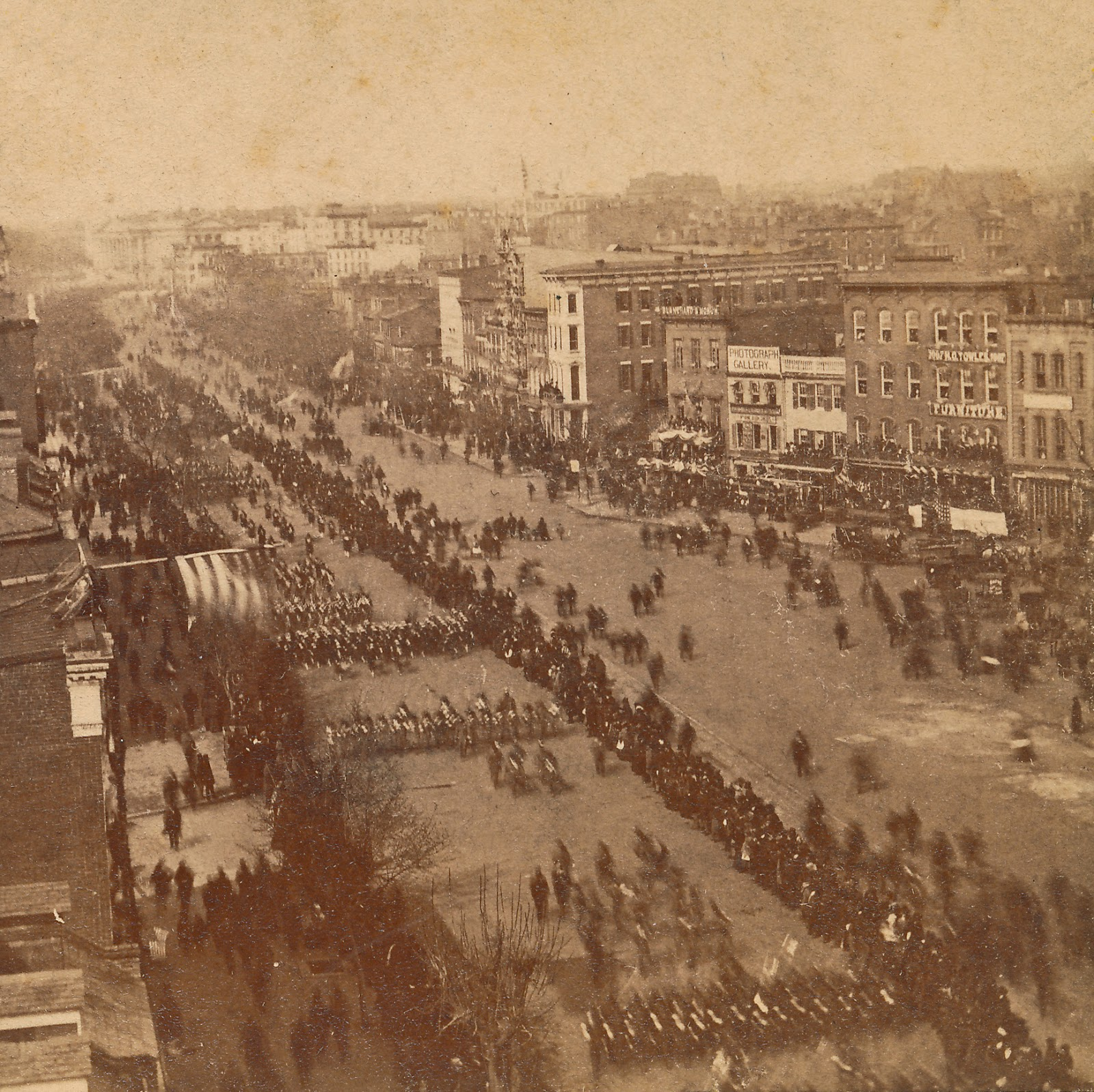
Grant Inauguration Parade 1873 detail

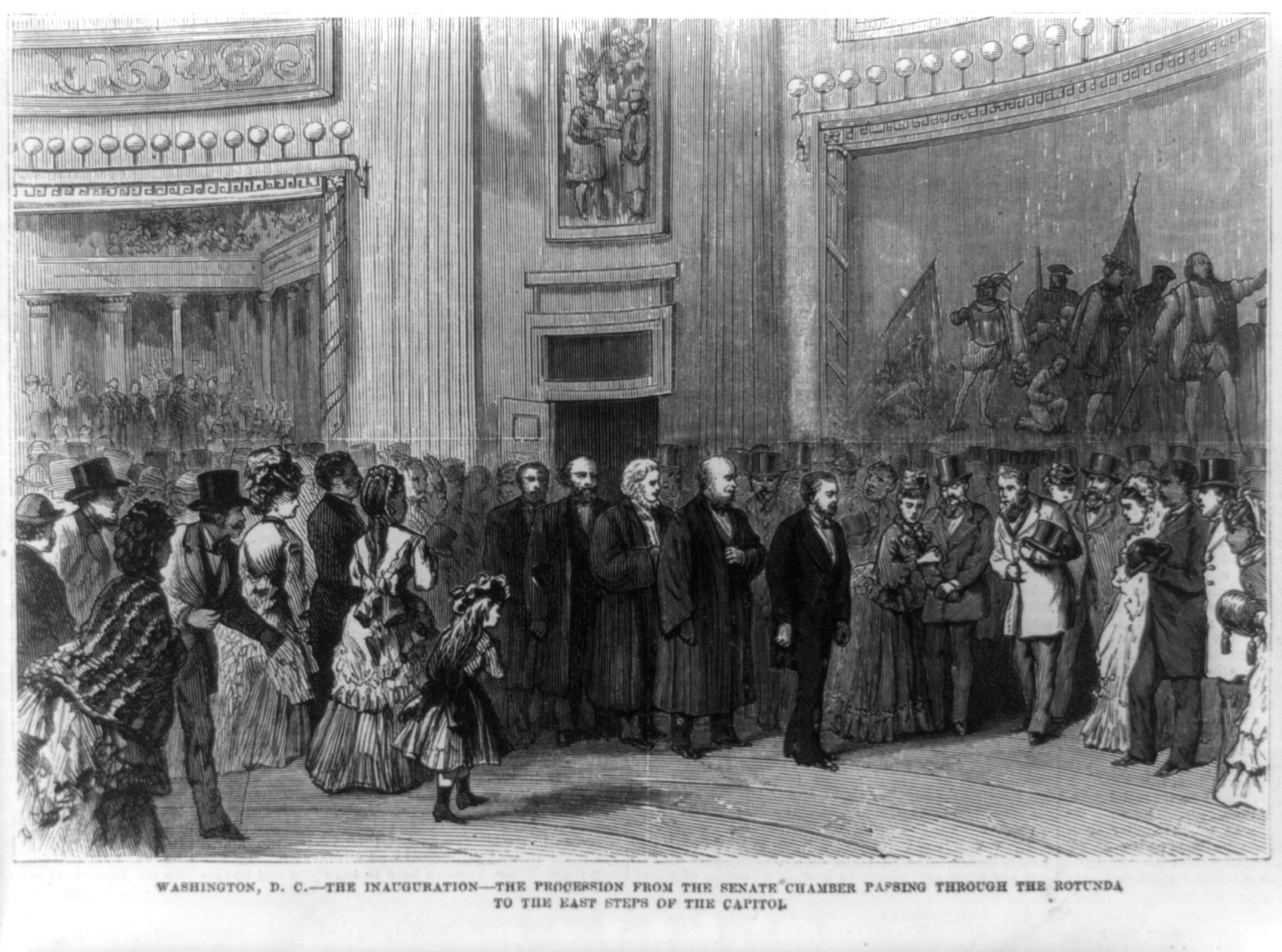
The inauguration - The procession from the Senate chamber passing through the rotunda to the east steps of the Capitol [March 4, 1873]

== See also ==
- Presidency of Ulysses S. Grant
- First inauguration of Ulysses S. Grant
- 1872 United States presidential election

== Sources ==
- Ambrose, Kevin (13 January 2009). "Inauguration Weather: Record Cold for Reagan". Capital Weather Gang. The Washington Post. Archived from the original on August 7, 2020.
- Chernow, Ron (2017). Grant. London: Penguin Press. ISBN 978-1-5942-0487-6.
- Coffey, Walter. The Reconstruction Years The Tragic Aftermath of the War Between the States. AuthorHouse, 2014
- Green, Constance McLaughlin. Secret City: A History of Race Relations in the Nation's Capital. Princeton University Press, 2015.
- Lane, Charles. The Day Freedom Died: The Colfax Massacre, The Supreme Court, and the Betrayal of Reconstruction. Macmillan, 2008.
- Shields, David S. The Culinarians: Lives and Careers from the First Age of American Fine Dining. University of Chicago Press, 2017.
- Skvarla, Diane K., and Donald A. Ritchie. United States Senate Catalogue of Graphic Art. Vol. 109, no. 2. Government Printing Office, 2006.
- White, Ronald C. (2016). American Ulysses: A Life of Ulysses S. Grant. Random House Publishing Group. ISBN 978-1-5883-6992-5.
- "The Inauguration". Washington Evening Star. March 3, 1873.
