= Lunar habitation =

Discussion of human needs and organization on the Moon

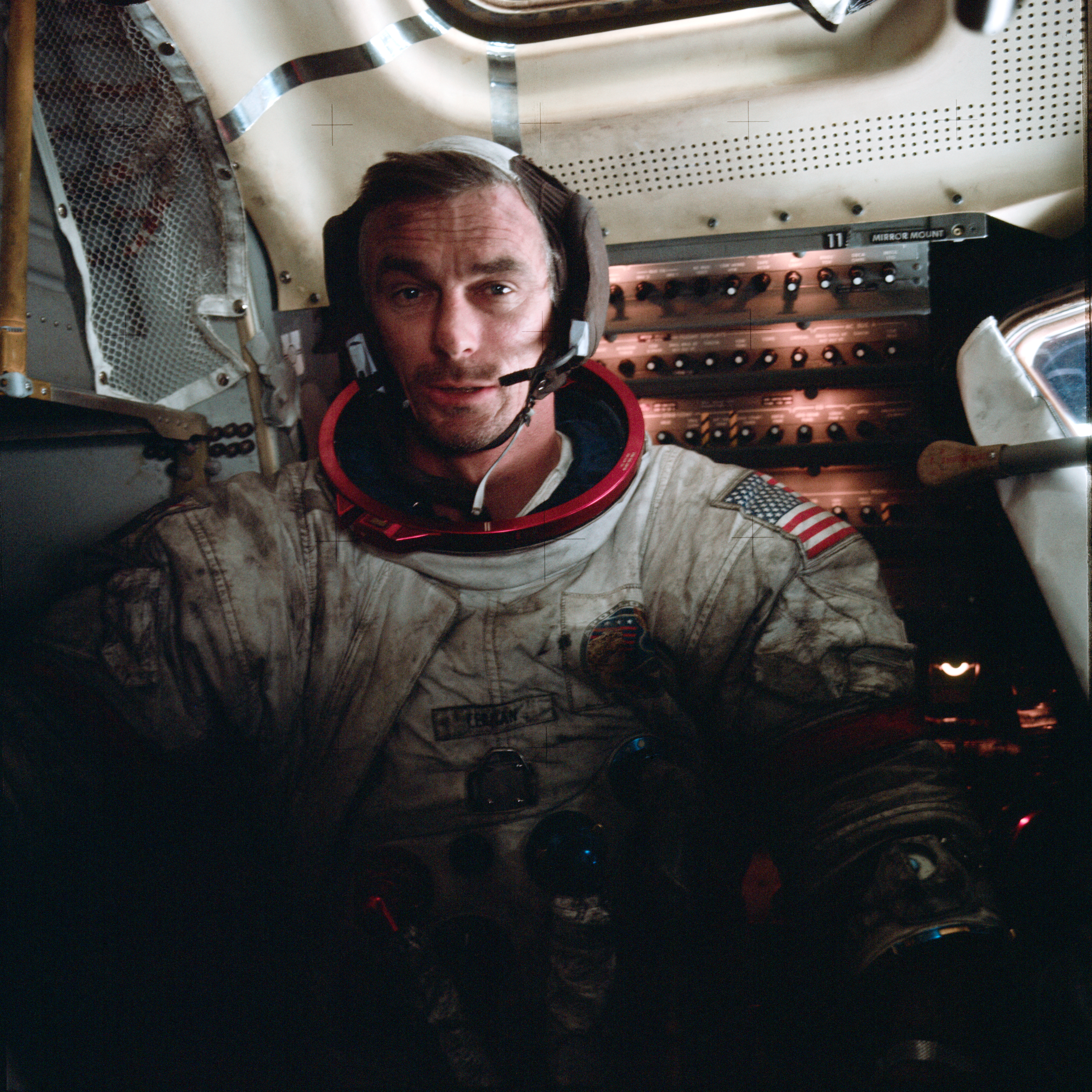
Gene Cernan on the Moon in the Apollo 17 lander with lunar dust stuck on his suit. Lunar dust is highly abrasive and can cause damage to human lungs, nervous, and cardiovascular systems.

Lunar habitation is any human habitation on the Moon. Lunar habitation is provided by surface habitats, possibly as part of a moonbase.

== History ==
Lunar Module Eagle, the first lunar surface habitat and the first time people stayed on and explored an extraterrestrial body, July 20, 1969

Lunar habitats have been designed for many different proposed moonbases. The only lunar habitats to have been erected thus far were the temporary Apollo Lunar Modules, such as Eagle of Tranquility Base, the first. As of 2024, two programs, the US-led Artemis program and Chinese-led International Lunar Research Station aim to establish permanent surface settlements.

== Analysis ==
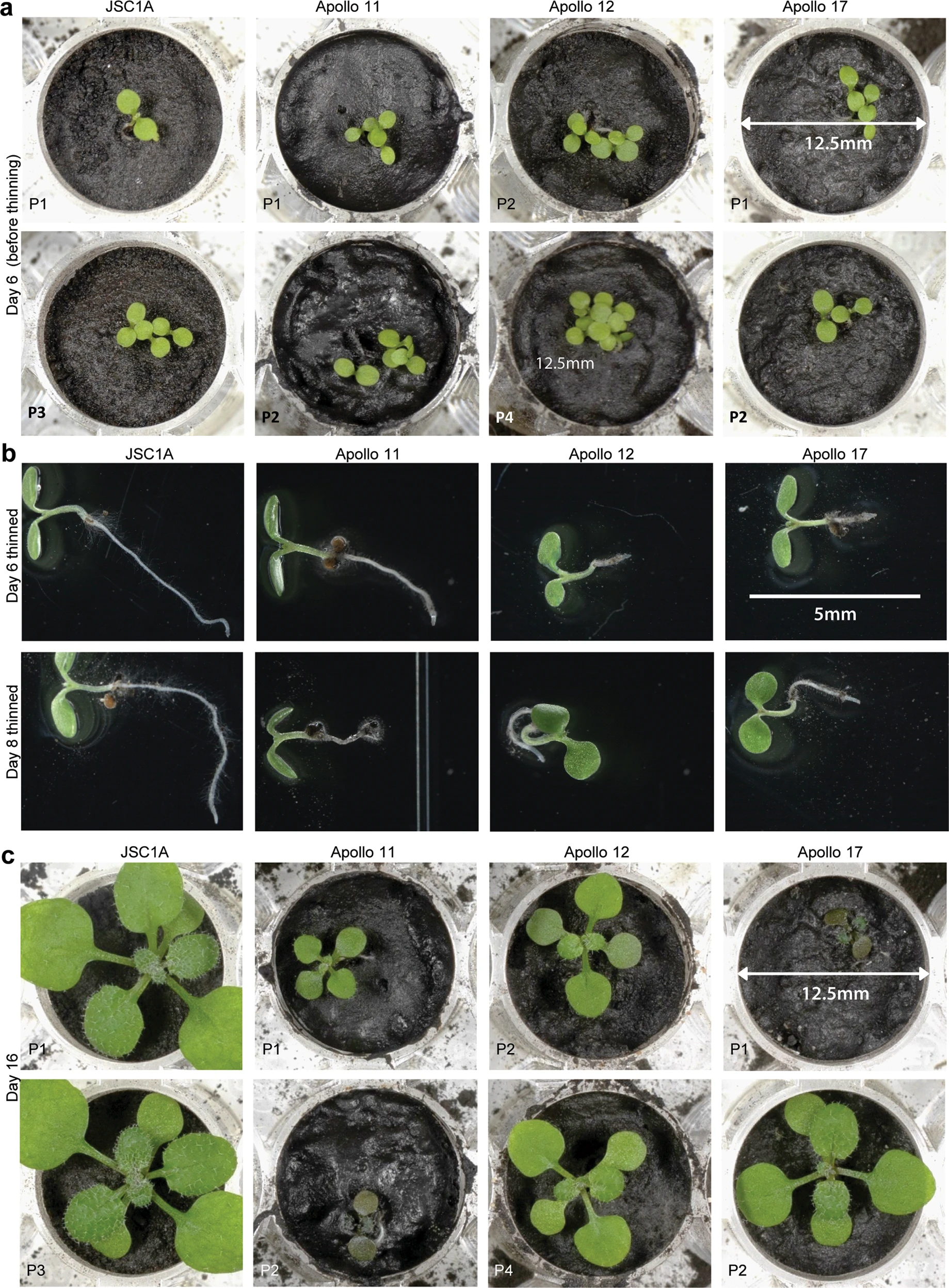
Growth of plants in lunar regolith, in a laboratory with Apollo program regolith samples.

Setting up structures on a natural body would provide ample sources of material for their construction, particularly for purposes such as shielding from cosmic radiation. The energy required to send objects from the Moon to space is much less than from Earth to space. This could allow the Moon to serve as a source of construction materials within cis-lunar space. Rockets launched from the Moon would require less locally produced propellant than rockets launched from Earth. Some proposals include using electric acceleration devices (mass drivers) to propel objects off the Moon without building rockets. Others have proposed momentum exchange tethers (see below). Furthermore, the Moon does have some gravity, which experience to date indicates may be vital for fetal development and long-term human health. Whether the Moon's gravity (roughly one sixth of Earth's) is adequate for this purpose is uncertain. In addition, the Moon is the closest large body in the Solar System to Earth. While some Earth-crosser asteroids occasionally pass closer, the Moon's distance is consistently within a small range close to 384,400 km.

=== Advantages ===
- Building observatory facilities on the Moon from lunar materials allows many of the benefits of space based facilities without the need to launch these into space. The lunar soil, although it poses a problem for any moving parts of telescopes, can be mixed with carbon nanotubes and epoxies in the construction of mirrors up to 50 meters in diameter. It is relatively nearby; astronomical seeing is not a concern; certain craters near the poles are permanently dark and cold, and thus especially useful for infrared telescopes; and radio telescopes on the far side would be shielded from the radio chatter of Earth. A lunar zenith telescope can be made cheaply with ionic liquid.
- A farm at the lunar north pole could provide eight hours of sunlight per day during the local summer by rotating crops in and out of the sunlight which is continuous for the entire summer. A beneficial temperature, radiation protection, insects for pollination, and all other plant needs could be artificially provided during the local summer for a cost. One estimate suggested a 0.5 hectare space farm could feed 100 people.

=== Disadvantages ===
- The long lunar night would impede reliance on solar power and require that a facility exposed to the sunlit equatorial surface be designed to withstand large temperature extremes (about 95 K (−178.2 °C) to about 400 K (127 °C)). An exception to this restriction are the so-called "peaks of eternal light" located at the lunar north pole that are constantly bathed in sunlight. The rim of Shackleton Crater, towards the lunar south pole, also has a near-constant solar illumination. Other areas near the poles that get light most of the time could be linked in a power grid. The temperature 1 meter below the surface of the Moon is estimated to be near constant over the period of a month varying with latitude from near 220 K (−53 °C) at the equator to near 150 K (−123 °C) at the poles. This could be used as a heat reservoir.
- The Moon is highly depleted in volatile elements, such as nitrogen and hydrogen. Carbon, which forms volatile oxides, is also depleted. A number of robot probes including Lunar Prospector gathered evidence of hydrogen generally in the Moon's crust consistent with what would be expected from solar wind, and higher concentrations near the poles. There had been some disagreement whether the hydrogen must necessarily be in the form of water. The 2009 mission of the Lunar Crater Observation and Sensing Satellite (LCROSS) proved that there is water on the Moon. This water exists in ice form perhaps mixed in small crystals in the regolith in a colder landscape than has ever been mined. Other volatiles containing carbon and nitrogen were found in the same cold trap as ice. If no sufficient means is found for recovering these volatiles on the Moon, they would need to be imported from some other source to support life and industrial processes. Volatiles would need to be stringently recycled. This would limit any growth and keep the habitat dependent on imports. Transport costs would be reduced by a lunar space elevator if and when one can be constructed.
- The 2006 announcement by the Keck Observatory that the binary Trojan asteroid 617 Patroclus, and possibly large numbers of other Trojan objects in Jupiter's orbit, are likely composed of water ice, with a layer of dust, and the hypothesized large amounts of water ice on the closer, main-belt asteroid 1 Ceres, suggest that importing volatiles from this region via the Interplanetary Transport Network may be practical in the not-so-distant future. These possibilities are dependent on complicated and expensive resource utilization from the mid to outer Solar System, which is not likely to become available for a significant period of time.
- The lack of a substantial atmosphere for insulation results in temperature extremes and makes the Moon's surface conditions somewhat like a deep space vacuum with surface pressure (night) of 3 × 10^{−15} bar. It also leaves the lunar surface exposed to half as much radiation as in interplanetary space (with the other half blocked by the Moon itself underneath the habitat), raising the issues of the health threat from cosmic rays and the risk of proton exposure from the solar wind. In 2020 scientists reported the first ever measurements, made via China's Chang'e 4 lander, of the radiation exposure dose on the lunar surface. Lunar rubble can protect living quarters from cosmic rays. Shielding against solar flares during expeditions outside is more problematic.
- When the Moon passes through the magnetotail of the Earth, the plasma sheet whips across its surface. Electrons crash into the Moon and are released again by UV photons on the day side but build up voltages on the dark side. This causes a negative charge build up from −200 V to −1000 V. See Magnetic field of the Moon.
- Moon dust is an extremely abrasive glassy substance formed by micrometeorites and unrounded due to the lack of weathering. It sticks to everything, can damage equipment, and it may be toxic. Since it is bombarded by charged particles in the solar wind, it is highly ionized, and is extremely harmful when breathed in. During the 1960s and 1970s Apollo missions, astronauts were subject to respiratory problems on return flights from the Moon, for this reason.
- Growing crops on the Moon faces many difficult challenges due to the long lunar night (354 hours), extreme variation in surface temperature, exposure to solar flares, soil with almost no nitrogen and little potassium, and lack of insects for pollination. Due to the lack of any atmosphere of substance on the Moon, plants would need to be grown in sealed chambers, though experiments have shown that plants can thrive at pressures much lower than those on Earth. The use of electric lighting to compensate for the 354-hour night might be difficult: a single acre (0.405 hectare) of plants on Earth enjoys a peak 4 megawatts of sunlight power at noon. Experiments conducted by the Soviet space program in the 1970s suggest it is possible to grow conventional crops with the 354-hour light, 354-hour dark cycle. A variety of concepts for lunar agriculture have been proposed, including the use of minimal artificial light to maintain plants during the night and the use of fast-growing crops that might be started as seedlings with artificial light and be harvestable at the end of one lunar day. An experiment in the Chinese Chang'e 4 lunar lander mission demonstrated that seeds could sprout and grow in protected conditions on the Moon (January 2019). The cotton seeds were able to handle the harsh conditions, at least initially, becoming the first plants ever to sprout on the surface of another world. But without a source of heat, the plants died in the cold lunar night. Lampenflora which grows in caves that have fixed artificial light sources installed shows that plants exist that need very little light to survive.

== Energy ==
=== Nuclear power ===
A nuclear fission reactor might fulfill most of a Moon base's power requirements. With the help of fission reactors, one could overcome the difficulty of the 354 hour lunar night. According to NASA, a nuclear fission power station could generate a steady 40 kilowatts, equivalent to the demand of about eight houses on Earth. An artist's concept of such a station published by NASA envisages the reactor being buried below the Moon's surface to shield it from its surroundings; out from a tower-like generator part reaching above the surface over the reactor, radiators would extend into space to send away any heat energy that may be left over.

Radioisotope thermoelectric generators could be used as backup and emergency power sources for solar powered facilities. The needed radioisotopes could either be imported from earth as they are relatively energy-dense, or produced in situ by neutron irradiation of suitable materials (e.g. ^{237}Np - an unavoidably produced minor actinide in fission reactors operating with thermal neutrons - to produce the commonly used ^{238}Pu) or separated chemically from the high level waste of the nuclear reactor (e.g. Americium-241). Such nuclear batteries have been used for decades in spacecraft by all major spacefaring nations and some have even been implanted in humans as power sources for medical devices such as pacemakers, meaning their behavior and tradeoffs are well understood.

The Japanese spacecraft Kaguya confirmed the existence of both uranium and thorium near the lunar surface, which might in the future allow for the local production of nuclear fission fuel from lunar resources. However, concentrations are relatively low and unless the thorium fuel cycle is used, uranium would likely have to be enriched to produce fuel usable in light water reactors. The isotopic composition of lunar uranium is not known, but there is little reason to assume it would differ much from that found on earth (99% ^{238}U, ~0.72% ^{235}U, 55 ppm ^{234}U). Nuclear reprocessing in situ would reduce the need for enrichment or imported fuel from earth. Pyroprocessing, which has been demonstrated at the Integral Fast Reactor prototype operated by Argonne National Laboratory, could be used instead of the de facto standard PUREX which requires large amounts of organic solvents.

One specific development program in the 2000s was the Fission Surface Power (FSP) project of NASA and DOE, a fission power system focused on "developing and demonstrating a nominal 40 kWe power system to support human exploration missions. The FSP system concept uses conventional low-temperature stainless steel, liquid metal-cooled reactor technology coupled with Stirling power conversion." By 2010, significant component hardware testing had been successfully completed, and a non-nuclear system demonstration test was being fabricated.

In May 2018, NASA and DOE conducted an experiment to demonstrate heat transfer technologies using highly enriched uranium fuel. The Kilopower Reactor Using Stirling Technology (KRUSTY) experiment showed that the system performed as expected under both normal and off-normal conditions. Japan also developed the RAPID-L conceptual design.

In June 2022, NASA and DOE selected three fission power concepts for surface power system deomonstration on the Moon that could be ready to launch by the end of the decade. The technology would benefit future exploration as part of Artemis. The focus of the collaboration with industry is to design, fabricate, and test a 40-kilowatt class fission power system by the early 2030s. The concept design phase concluded in early 2024.

Helium-3 mining could be used to provide a substitute for tritium for potential production of fusion power in the future.

=== Solar energy ===
Solar energy is a possible source of power for a lunar base. Many of the raw materials needed for solar panel production can be extracted on site. The long lunar night (354 hours or 14.75 Earth days) is a drawback for solar power on the Moon's surface. This might be solved by building several power plants, so that at least one of them is always in daylight. Another possibility would be to build such a power plant where there is constant or near-constant sunlight, such as at the Malapert mountain near the lunar south pole, or on the rim of Peary crater near the north pole. Since lunar regolith contains structural metals like iron and aluminum, solar panels could be mounted high up on locally-built towers that might rotate to follow the Sun. A third possibility would be to leave the panels in orbit, and beam the power down as microwaves.

The solar energy converters need not be silicon solar panels. It may be more advantageous to use the larger temperature difference between Sun and shade to run heat engine generators. Concentrated sunlight could also be relayed via mirrors and used in Stirling engines or solar trough generators, or it could be used directly for lighting, agriculture and process heat. The focused heat might also be employed in materials processing to extract various elements from lunar surface materials.

==== Energy storage ====
Fuel cells on the Space Shuttle have operated reliably for up to 17 Earth days at a time. On the Moon, they would only be needed for 354 hours (14 3/4 days) – the length of the lunar night. Fuel cells produce water directly as a waste product. Current fuel cell technology is more advanced than the Shuttle's cells – PEM (Proton Exchange Membrane) cells produce considerably less heat (though their waste heat would likely be useful during the lunar night) and are lighter, not to mention the reduced mass of the smaller heat-dissipating radiators. This makes PEMs more economical to launch from Earth than the shuttle's cells. Early design PEMs flew in space on the Gemini missions of the mid-1960s; advanced technology systems available today have not been fully proven in space.

Combining fuel cells with electrolysis would provide a "perpetual" source of electricity – solar energy could be used to provide power during the lunar day, and fuel cells at night. During the lunar day, solar energy would also be used to electrolyze the water created in the fuel cells – although there would be small losses of gases that would have to be replaced.

Even if lunar facilities could provide themselves access to a near-continuous source of solar energy, they would still need to maintain fuel cells or an alternate energy storage system to sustain themselves during lunar eclipses and emergency situations.

== Locations ==
Soviet astronomer Vladislav V. Shevchenko proposed in 1988 the following three criteria that a lunar outpost should meet:

- good conditions for transport operations;
- a great number of different types of natural objects and features on the Moon of scientific interest; and
- natural resources, such as oxygen. The abundance of certain minerals, such as iron oxide, varies dramatically over the lunar surface.

While a habitat might be located anywhere, potential locations for a lunar habitat fall into three broad categories.

=== Polar regions ===
There are two reasons why the north pole and south pole of the Moon might be attractive locations for a human facility. First, there is evidence for the presence of water in some continuously shaded areas near the poles. Second, the Moon's axis of rotation is sufficiently close to being perpendicular to the ecliptic plane that the radius of the Moon's polar circles is less than 50 km. Power collection stations could therefore be plausibly located so that at least one is exposed to sunlight at all times, thus making it possible to power polar facilities almost exclusively with solar energy. Solar power would be unavailable only during a lunar eclipse, but these events are relatively brief and absolutely predictable. Any such habitat would therefore require a reserve energy supply that could temporarily sustain a habitat during lunar eclipses or in the event of any incident or malfunction affecting solar power collection. Hydrogen fuel cells would be ideal for this purpose, since the hydrogen needed could be sourced locally using the Moon's polar water and surplus solar power. Moreover, due to the Moon's uneven surface some sites have nearly continuous sunlight. For example, Malapert mountain, located near the Shackleton crater at the lunar south pole, offers several advantages as a site:

- It is exposed to the Sun most of the time (see Peak of Eternal Light); two closely spaced arrays of solar panels would receive nearly continuous power.
- Its proximity to Shackleton Crater (116 km, or 69.8 mi) means that it could provide power and communications to the crater. This crater is potentially valuable for astronomical observation. An infrared instrument would benefit from the very low temperatures. A radio telescope would benefit from being shielded from Earth's broad spectrum radio interference.
- The nearby Shoemaker and other craters are in constant deep shadow, and might contain valuable concentrations of hydrogen and other volatiles.
- At around 5,000 meters (16,000 feet) elevation, it offers line of sight communications over a large area of the Moon, as well as to Earth.
- The South Pole-Aitken basin is located at the lunar south pole. This is the second largest known impact basin in the Solar System, as well as the oldest and biggest impact feature on the Moon, and should provide geologists access to deeper layers of the Moon's crust. It is where the Chinese Chang'e 4 has landed, on the far side.

NASA chose to use a south-polar site for the lunar outpost reference design in the Exploration Systems Architecture Study chapter on lunar architecture. At the north pole, the rim of Peary Crater has been proposed as a favorable location for a base. Examination of images from the Clementine mission in 1994 appear to show that parts of the crater rim are permanently illuminated by sunlight (except during lunar eclipses). As a result, the temperature conditions are expected to remain very stable at this location, averaging −50 °C (−58 °F). This is comparable to winter conditions in Earth's Poles of Cold in Siberia and Antarctica. The interior of Peary Crater may also harbor hydrogen deposits.

A 1994 bistatic radar experiment performed during the Clementine mission suggested the presence of water ice around the south pole. The Lunar Prospector spacecraft reported in 2008 enhanced hydrogen abundances at the south pole and even more at the north pole. On the other hand, results reported using the Arecibo radio telescope have been interpreted by some to indicate that the anomalous Clementine radar signatures are not indicative of ice, but surface roughness. This interpretation is not universally agreed upon.

A potential limitation of the polar regions is that the inflow of solar wind can create an electrical charge on the leeward side of crater rims. The resulting voltage difference can affect electrical equipment, change surface chemistry, erode surfaces and levitate lunar dust.

=== Equatorial regions ===
The lunar equatorial regions are likely to have higher concentrations of helium-3 (rare on Earth but much sought after for use in nuclear fusion research) because the solar wind has a higher angle of incidence. They also enjoy an advantage in extra-Lunar traffic: The rotation advantage for launching material is slight due to the Moon's slow rotation, but the corresponding orbit coincides with the ecliptic, nearly coincides with the lunar orbit around Earth, and nearly coincides with the equatorial plane of Earth.

Several probes have landed in the Oceanus Procellarum area. There are many areas and features that could be subject to long-term study, such as the Reiner Gamma anomaly and the dark-floored Grimaldi crater.

=== Far side ===
The lunar far side lacks direct communication with Earth, though a communication satellite at the L_{2} Lagrangian point, or a network of orbiting satellites, could enable communication between the far side of the Moon and Earth. The far side is also a good location for a large radio telescope because it is well shielded from the Earth. Due to the lack of atmosphere, the location is also suitable for an array of optical telescopes, similar to the Very Large Telescope in Chile.

Scientists have estimated that the highest concentrations of helium-3 can be found in the maria on the far side, as well as near side areas containing concentrations of the titanium-based mineral ilmenite. On the near side the Earth and its magnetic field partially shield the surface from the solar wind during each orbit. But the far side is fully exposed, and thus should receive a somewhat greater proportion of the ion stream.

=== Lunar lava tubes ===
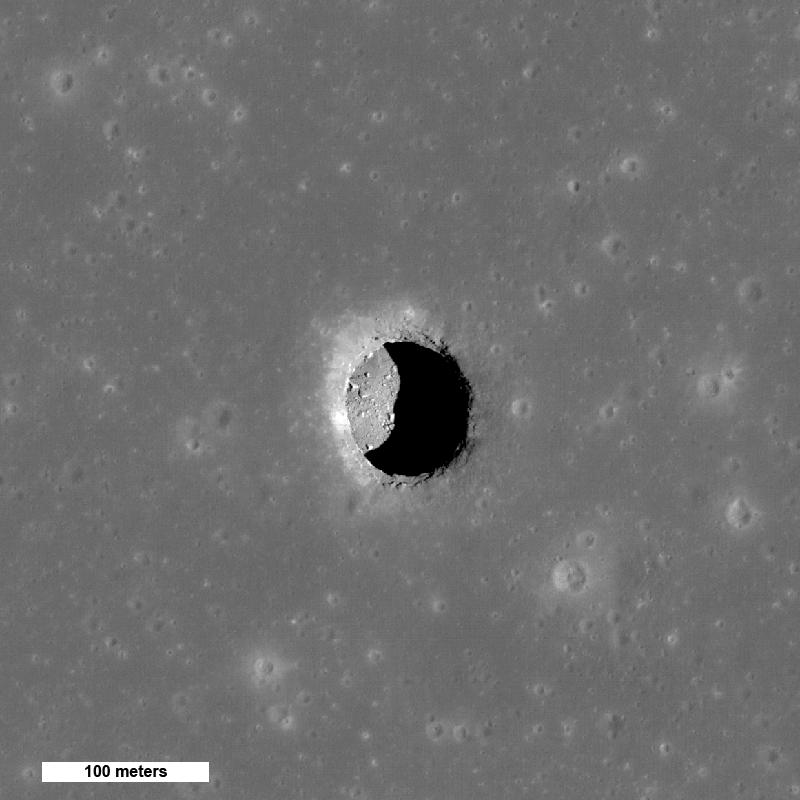
Sunlight reveals the terrain of a 100-meter-deep lunar pit crater, which may be a collapsed lava tube.

Lunar lava tubes are a potential location for constructing a lunar base. Any intact lava tube on the Moon could serve as a shelter from the severe environment of the lunar surface, with its frequent meteorite impacts, high-energy ultra-violet radiation and energetic particles, and extreme diurnal temperature variations. Lava tubes provide ideal positions for shelter because of their access to nearby resources. They also have proven themselves to be reliable structures, having withstood the test of time for billions of years.

An underground habitat would escape the extreme temperatures on the Moon's surface. The day period (about 354 hours) has an average temperature of about 107 °C (225 °F), although it can rise as high as 123 °C (253 °F). The night period (also 354 hours) has an average temperature of about −153 °C (−243 °F). Underground, both day and night periods would be around −23 °C (−9 °F), and humans could install ordinary heaters for warmth.

One such lava tube was discovered in early 2009.

== Habitat construction ==
There have been numerous proposals regarding lunar habitats. The designs have evolved throughout the years as knowledge about the Moon has grown, and as the technological possibilities have changed.

The proposed habitats range from the actual spacecraft landers or their used fuel tanks, to inflatable modules of various shapes. Some hazards of the lunar environment such as sharp temperature shifts, lack of atmosphere or magnetic field (which means higher levels of radiation and micrometeoroids) and long nights, were unknown early on. Proposals have shifted as these hazards were recognized and taken into consideration.

=== Underground habitat ===
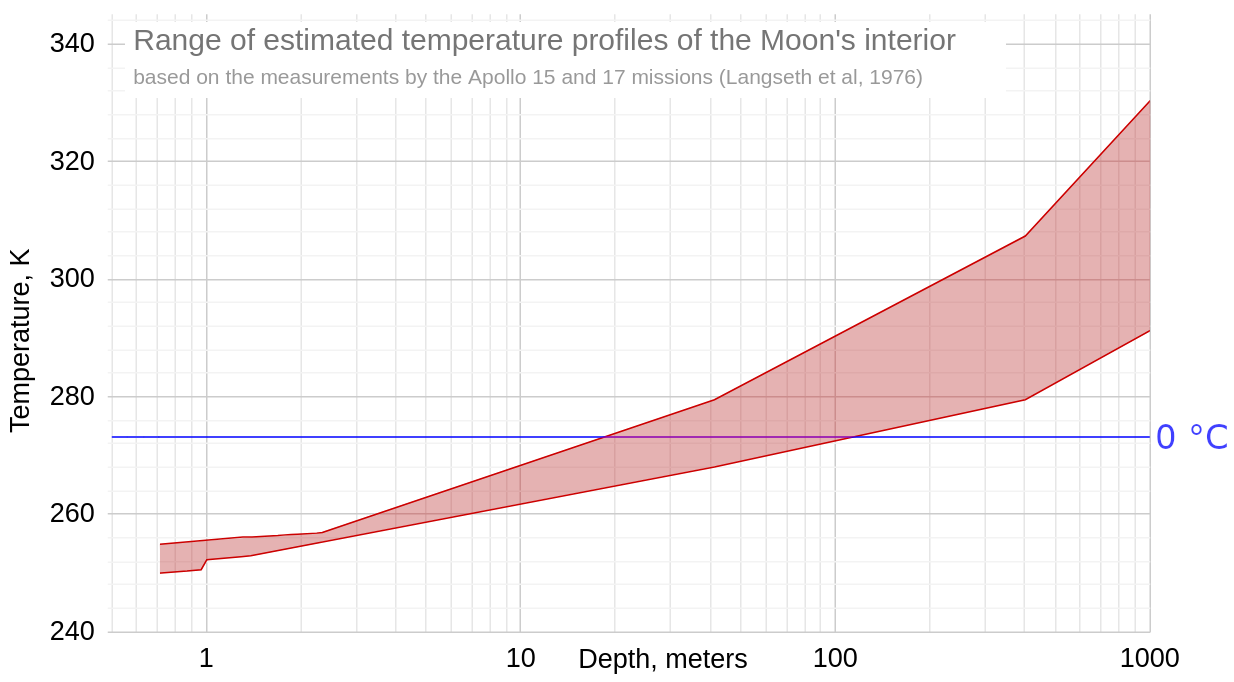
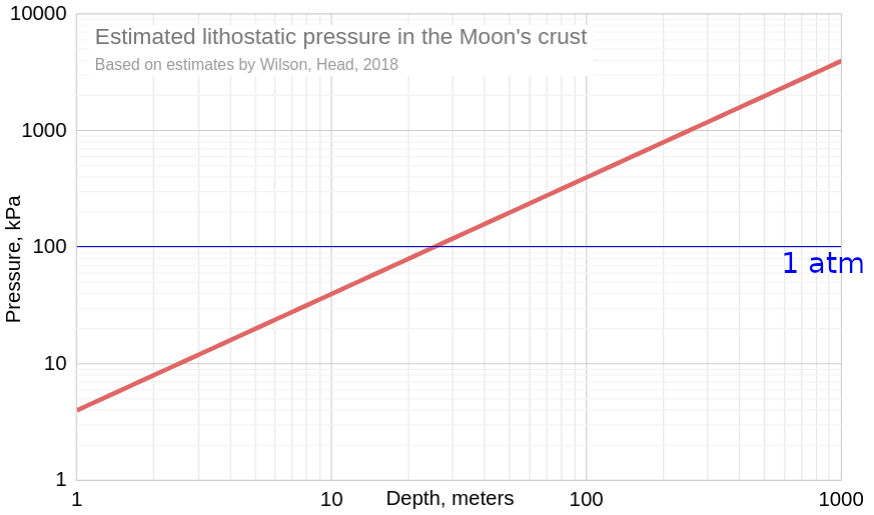
The temperature and pressure of the Moon's interior increase with depth

Some suggest building the lunar habitats underground, which would give protection from radiation and micrometeoroids. This would also greatly reduce the risk of air leakage, as the habitat would be fully sealed from the outside except for a few exits to the surface. These underground habitats would be akin to bunkers/fallout shelters.

The construction of an underground habitat would probably be more complex; one of the first machines from Earth might be a remote-controlled excavating machine. Once created, some sort of hardening would be necessary to avoid collapse, possibly a spray-on concrete-like substance made from available materials. A more porous insulating material also made in-situ could then be applied. Rowley & Neudecker have suggested "melt-as-you-go" machines that would leave glassy internal surfaces. Mining methods such as the room and pillar might also be used. Inflatable self-sealing fabric habitats might then be put in place to retain air.

An alternative solution is studied in Europe by students to excavate a habitat in the ice-filled craters of the Moon.

==== Underground farming ====
Farms set up underground would need artificial sunlight. As an alternative to excavating, a lava tube could be covered and insulated, thus solving the problem of radiation exposure.

=== Surface habitats ===
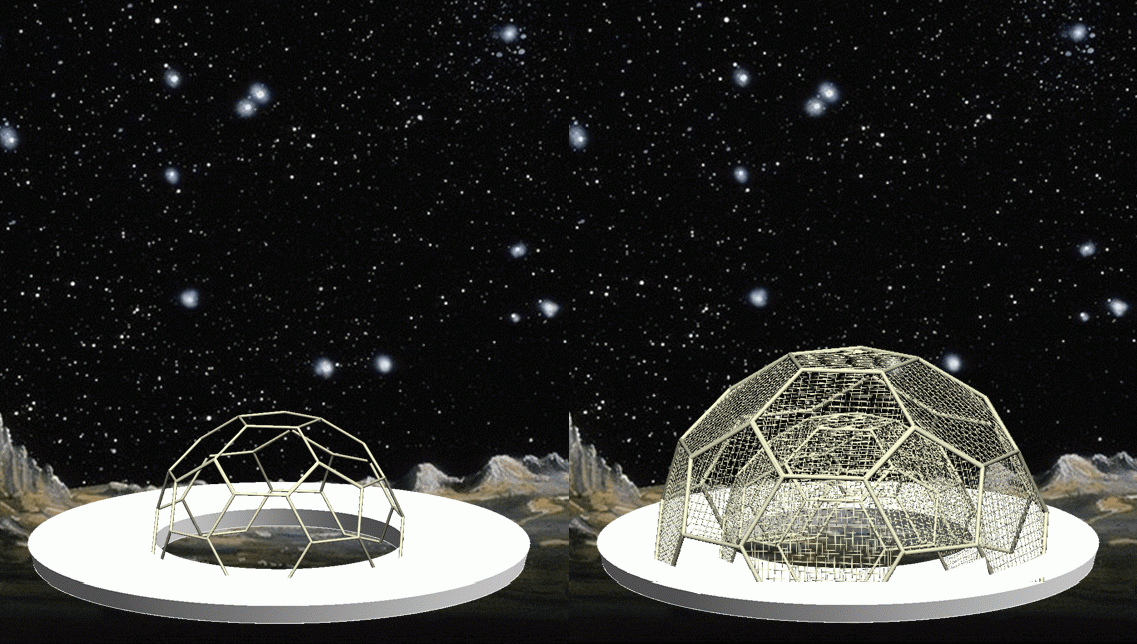
Double-dome concept for habitat creation on the Moon

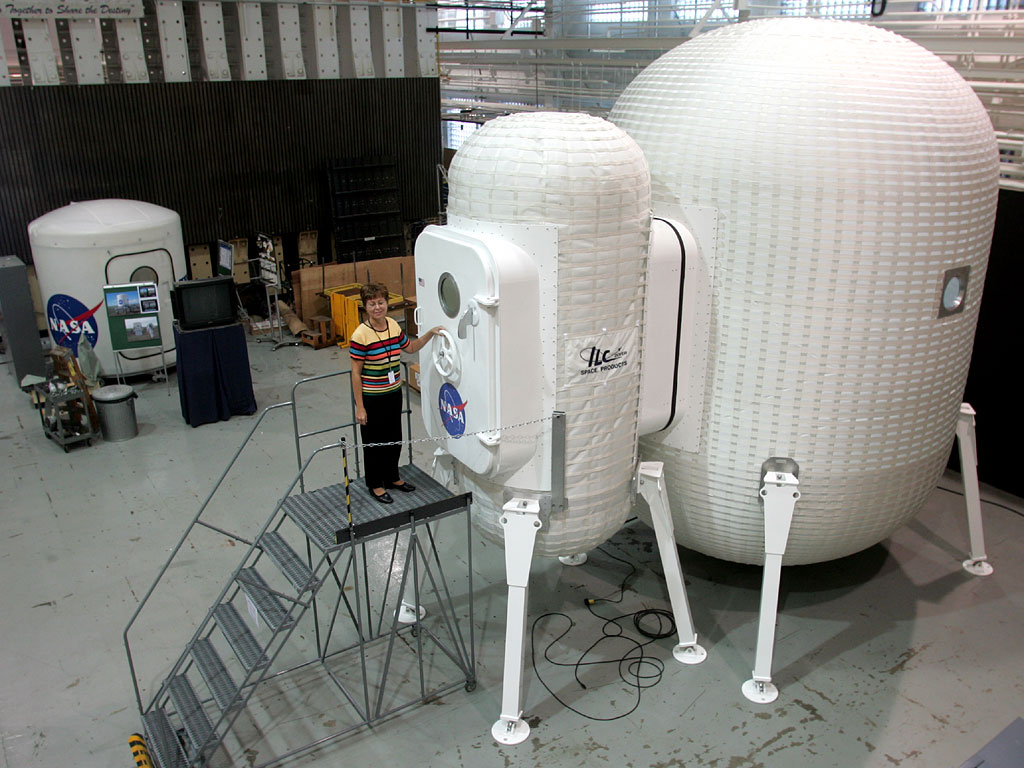
A NASA model of a proposed inflatable module

A possibly easier solution would be to build the lunar habitat on the surface, and cover modules with lunar soil. The lunar soil is composed of a unique blend of silica and iron-containing compounds that may be fused into a glass-like solid using microwave energy. Blacic has studied the mechanical properties of lunar glass and has shown that it is a promising material for making rigid structures, if coated with metal to keep moisture out. This may allow for the use of "lunar bricks" in structural designs, or the vitrification of loose dirt to form a hard, ceramic crust.

A lunar habitat built on the surface would need to be protected by improved radiation and micrometeoroid shielding. Building the lunar base inside a deep crater would provide at least partial shielding against radiation and micrometeoroids. Artificial magnetic fields have been proposed as a means to provide radiation shielding for long range deep space crewed missions, and it might be possible to use similar technology on a lunar habitat. Some regions on the Moon possess strong local magnetic fields that might partially mitigate exposure to charged solar and galactic particles.

In a turn from the usual engineer-designed lunar habitats, London-based Foster + Partners architectural firm proposed a building construction 3D-printer technology in January 2013 that would use lunar regolith raw materials to produce lunar building structures while using enclosed inflatable habitats for housing the human occupants inside the hard-shell lunar structures. Overall, these habitats would require only ten percent of the structure mass to be transported from Earth, while using local lunar materials for the other 90 percent of the structure mass. "Printed" lunar soil would provide both "radiation and temperature insulation. Inside, a lightweight pressurized inflatable with the same dome shape would be the living environment for the first human Moon settlers." The building technology would include mixing lunar material with magnesium oxide, which would turn the "moonstuff into a pulp that can be sprayed to form the block" when a binding salt is applied that "converts [this] material into a stone-like solid." Terrestrial versions of this 3D-printing building technology are already printing 2 metres (6 ft 7 in) of building material per hour with the next-generation printers capable of 3.5 metres (11 ft) per hour, sufficient to complete a building in a week.

==== 3D-printed structures ====
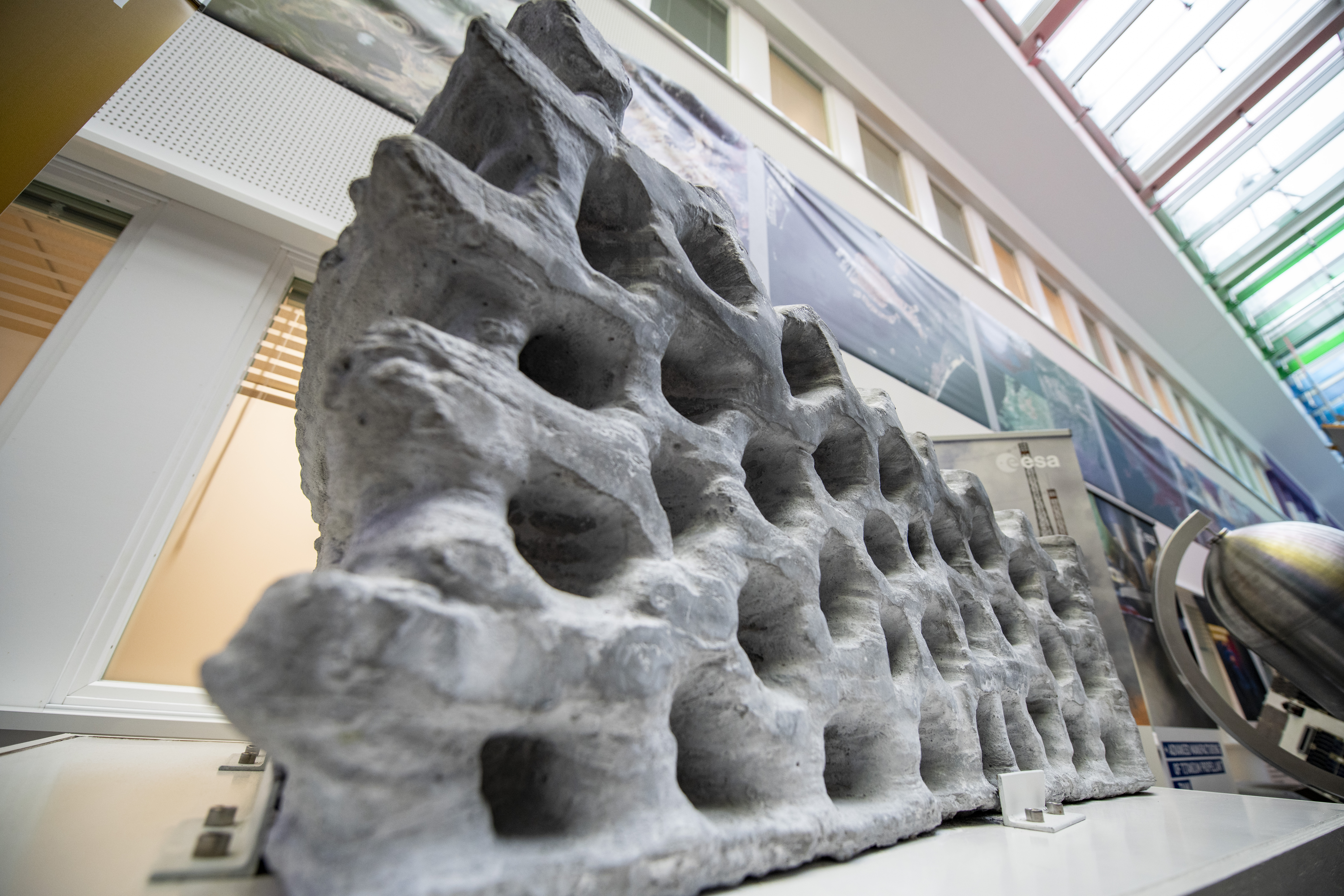
1.5-metric-ton (3,300 lb) block 3D‑printed from simulated lunar dust, to demonstrate the feasibility of constructing a Moon base using local materials

On January 31, 2013, the ESA working with Foster + Partners, tested a 3D-printed structure that could be constructed of lunar regolith for use as a Moon base. While 3-D printed facilities have been proposed, they still pose a number of obstacles such as the application temperature of the building material and the curing temperature are often different and requires extreme tolerances to be maintained. Additionally, all of the 3-D printing equipment will have to be set up prior to the printing to begin and once printing of the shell is complete this technique furthermore needs doors, windows, seals, and other electronics to be installed separately, making other techniques potentially more viable.

== Transportation ==
=== Earth to the Moon ===
Conventional rockets have been used for most lunar explorations to date. The ESA's SMART-1 mission from 2003 to 2006 used conventional chemical rockets to reach orbit and Hall effect thrusters to arrive at the Moon in 13 months. NASA would have used chemical rockets on its Ares V booster and Altair lander, that were being developed for a planned return to the Moon around 2019, but this was cancelled. The construction workers, location finders, and other astronauts vital to building, would have been taken four at a time in NASA's Orion spacecraft.

Space elevators are another proposed concept of Earth-Lunar transport.

=== On the surface ===
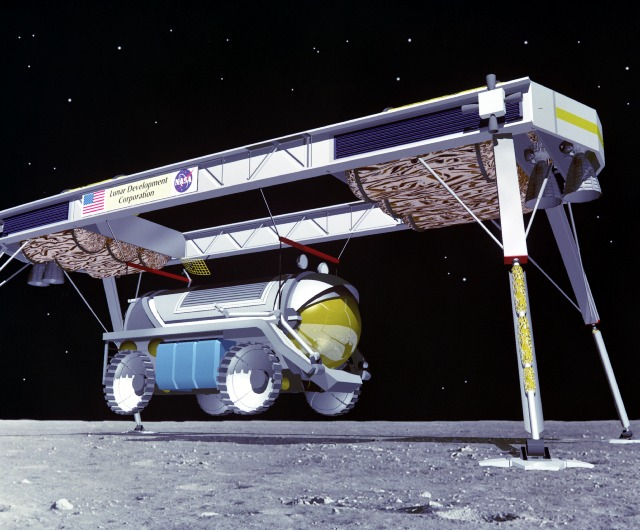
Artist's concept of a lunar rover being unloaded from a cargo spaceship

Lunar habitation would need the ability to transport cargo and people to and from modules and spacecraft, and to carry out scientific study of a larger area of the lunar surface for long periods of time. Proposed concepts include a variety of vehicle designs, from small open rovers to large pressurized modules with lab equipment, such as the Toyota rover concept.

Rovers could be useful if the terrain is not too steep or hilly. Rovers that have operated on the surface of the Moon include the three Apollo Lunar Roving Vehicles (LRV), developed by Boeing, the two robotic Soviet Lunokhods and the Chinese Yutu rovers that landed in 2013 and 2019. The LRV was an open rover for a crew of two, and a range of 92 kilometres (57 mi) during one lunar day. One NASA study resulted in the Mobile Lunar Laboratory concept, a crewed pressurized rover for a crew of two, with a range of 396 kilometres (246 mi). The Soviet Union developed different rover concepts in the Lunokhod series and the L5 for possible use on future crewed missions to the Moon or Mars. These rover designs were all pressurized for longer sorties.

If multiple bases were established on the lunar surface, they could be linked together by permanent railway systems. Both conventional and magnetic levitation (Maglev) systems have been proposed for the transport lines. Mag-Lev systems are particularly attractive as there is no atmosphere on the surface to slow down the train, so the vehicles could achieve velocities comparable to - or even higher than - aircraft on Earth. In essence any maglev on the moon would behave similar to a vactrain without the need to provide an artificial vacuum. One significant difference with lunar trains is that the cars would need to be individually sealed and possess their own life support systems.

For difficult areas, a flying vehicle may be more suitable. Bell Aerosystems proposed their design for the Lunar Flying Vehicle as part of a study for NASA, while Bell proposed the Manned Flying System, a similar concept.

=== Surface to space ===
==== Launch technology ====
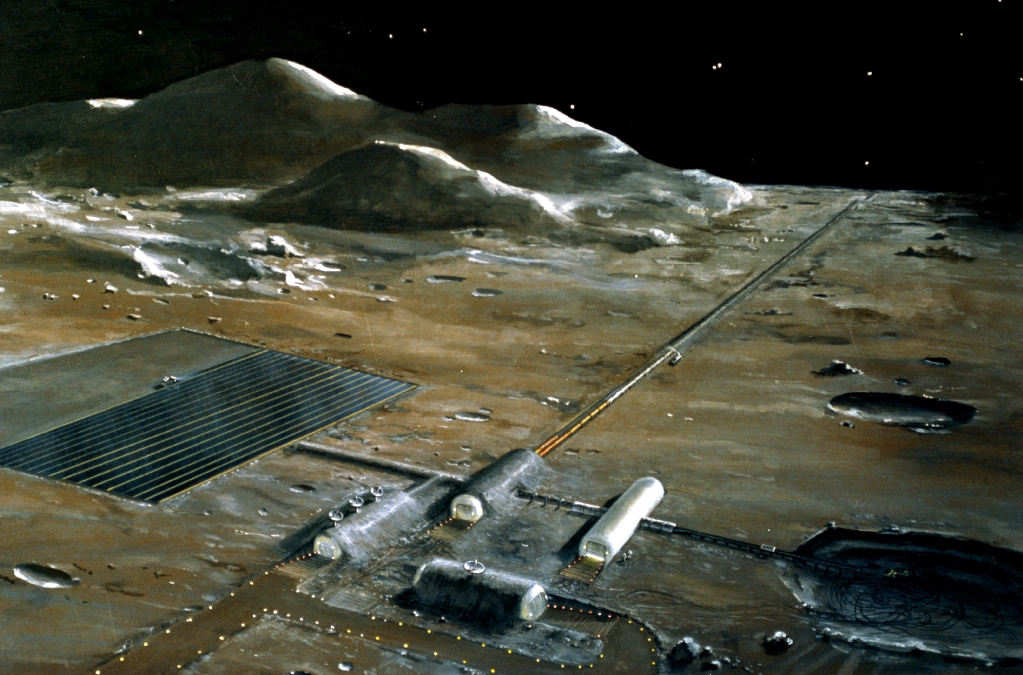
A mass driver—the long structure that goes toward the horizon—as part of a lunar base. NASA conceptual illustration.

Experience so far indicates that launching human beings into space is much more expensive than launching cargo. One way to get materials and products from the Moon to an interplanetary way station might be with a mass driver, a magnetically accelerated projectile launcher. Cargo would be picked up from orbit or an Earth-Moon Lagrangian point by a shuttle craft using ion propulsion, solar sails or other means and delivered to Earth orbit or other destinations such as near-Earth asteroids, Mars or other planets, perhaps using the Interplanetary Transport Network.

A lunar space elevator could transport people, raw materials and products to and from an orbital station at Lagrangian points L_{1} or L_{2}. Chemical rockets would take a payload from Earth to the L_{1} lunar Lagrange location. From there a tether would slowly lower the payload to a soft landing on the lunar surface. Other possibilities include a momentum exchange tether system.

==== Launch costs ====
- Estimates of the cost per unit mass of launching cargo or people from the Moon vary and the cost impacts of future technological improvements are difficult to predict. An upper bound on the cost of launching material from the Moon might be about $40,000,000 per kilogram, based on dividing the Apollo program costs by the amount of material returned. At the other extreme, the incremental cost of launching material from the Moon using an electromagnetic accelerator could be quite low. The efficiency of launching material from the Moon with a proposed electric accelerator is suggested to be about 50%. If the carriage of a mass driver weighs the same as the cargo, two kilograms must be accelerated to orbital velocity for each kilogram put into orbit. The overall system efficiency would then drop to 25%. So 1.4 kilowatt-hours would be needed to launch an incremental kilogram of cargo to low orbit from the Moon. At $0.1/kilowatt-hour, a typical cost for electrical power on Earth, that amounts to $0.16 for the energy to launch a kilogram of cargo into orbit. For the actual cost of an operating system, energy loss for power conditioning, the cost of radiating waste heat, the cost of maintaining all systems, and the interest cost of the capital investment are considerations.
- Passengers cannot be divided into the parcel size suggested for the cargo of a mass driver, nor subjected to hundreds of gravities acceleration. Technical developments could also affect the cost of launching passengers to orbit from the Moon. Instead of bringing all fuel and oxidizer from Earth, liquid oxygen could be produced from lunar materials and hydrogen should be available from the lunar poles. The cost of producing these on the Moon is yet unknown, but they would be more expensive than production costs on Earth. The situation of the local hydrogen is most open to speculation. As a rocket fuel, hydrogen could be extended by combining it chemically with silicon to form silane, which has yet to be demonstrated in an actual rocket engine. In the absence of more technical developments, the cost of transporting people from the Moon would be an impediment to growth.

=== Surface to and from cis-lunar space ===
A cislunar transport system has been proposed using tethers to achieve momentum exchange. This system requires zero net energy input, and could not only retrieve payloads from the lunar surface and transport them to Earth, but could also soft land payloads on to the lunar surface.

== See also ==
- Habitability of natural satellites — referring to life evolving on the satellite
- Lunar module
- Moonbase
- Surface chauvinism and surfacism
- Space habitat
- Space habitat (facility)
- Space habitation
