= Whipple (crater) =

Crater on the Moon

- Coordinates: 89.1°N 118.2°E
- Diameter: 15.7 km
- Depth: 3.1 km
- Eponym: Fred Lawrence Whipple

Whipple is a lunar impact crater located on the lunar far side near the northern pole. The crater is located East of the prominent craters Byrd and Peary; the latter of which it is located on the rim of.

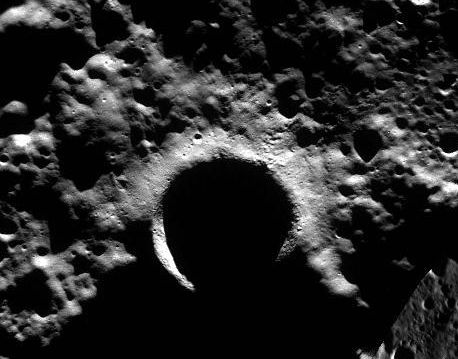
The Whipple Crater

Whipple is permanently shaded from the Sun. Volatile species of atoms and molecules, such as water (and mercury), that enter the crater freeze, and thus get trapped due to the extremely cold conditions that prevail within the crater. Moreover, Whipple crater's radar signature is characterized by a high, same-sense, circular-polarization ratio (CPR). This is thought to indicate that there are thick—at least 2 metres—ice deposits that are relatively pure. Such ice deposits represent a potentially valuable source of drinkable water, as well as rocket propellant in the form of liquid hydrogen and liquid oxygen (LH_{2}/LO_{2}).

In addition, Whipple is next to a large, quasi-permanently sunlit plateau that occupies its north rim. There, the sun is visible nearly 80% of the time on average; the temperature in such quasi-permanently sunlit areas is quite mild by Lunar standards, averaging approximately -50 °C, ± 10°. This combination of permanently shaded, high-CPR crater adjacent to quasi-permanently sunlit plateau is unique in the north polar region of the Moon.

Whipple was adopted and named after American astronomer Fred Lawrence Whipple by the IAU in 2009.
