= Whipple, Ohio =

Unincorporated community in Ohio, U.S.

Coordinates: 39°31′20″N 81°24′52″W

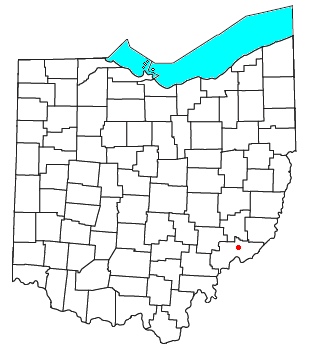
Location of Whipple, Ohio

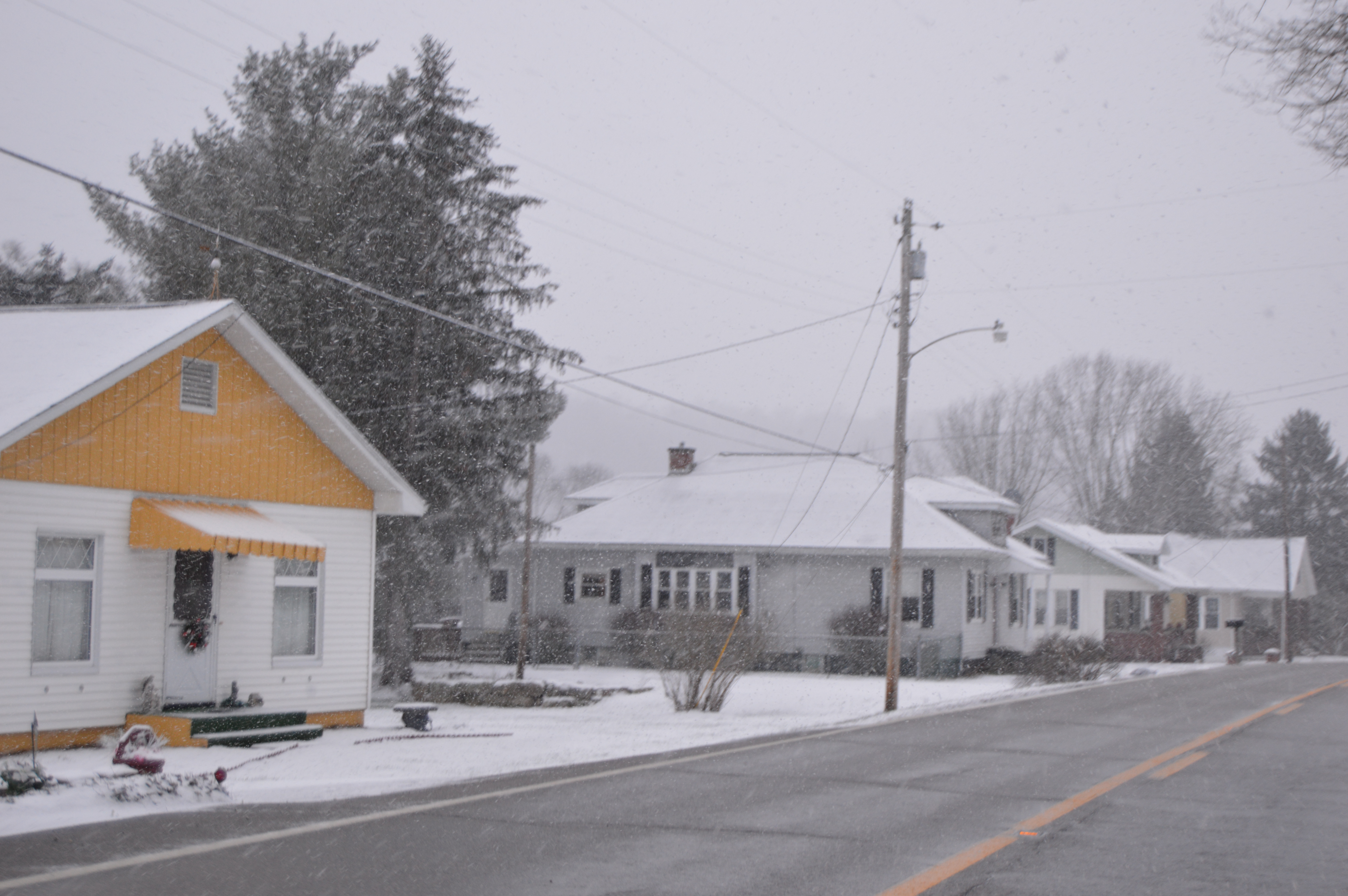
Houses on State Route 821

Whipple is an unincorporated community in southern Salem Township, Washington County, Ohio, United States. Although it is unincorporated, it once had a post office, with the ZIP code 45788. It lies on State Route 821 south of the village of Lower Salem, at the junction of Whipple Run with Duck Creek. The community took its name from nearby Whipple Run.

A post office called Whipple was in operation since 1871, but has closed in recent years. The iconic railroad trestle that once crossed over State Route 821 was ultimately removed in 2015 to make way for oil and gas companies entering the region, after long community debate.
