= W Cygni =

Semi-regular variable star in the constellation Cygnus

- Location of W Cygni (circled)

Observation data Epoch J2000.0 Equinox ICRS
- Constellation: Cygnus
- Right ascension: 21^{h} 36^{m} 02.49619^{s}
- Declination: +44° 22′ 28.5292″
- Apparent magnitude (V): 5.10 - 6.83

Characteristics
- Evolutionary stage: AGB
- Spectral type: M4e-M6e(Tc:)III
- U−B color index: +1.24
- B−V color index: +1.59
- Variable type: SRb

Astrometry
Radial velocity (R_{v})	−12.87 km/s
Proper motion (μ)	RA: 65.17 ± 0.42 mas/yr Dec.: 1.74 ± 0.30 mas/yr
Parallax (π)	5.72±0.38 mas
Distance	570 ± 40 ly (170 ± 10 pc)
Absolute magnitude (M_{V})	−0.43

Details
Mass	0.98 M_{☉}
Radius	227 R_{☉}
Luminosity	5,888 L_{☉}
Temperature	3,373 K

Other designations
- W Cyg, BD+44°3877, HD 205730, HIP 106642, HR 8262

Database references
SIMBAD	data

W Cygni is a semi-regular variable star in the constellation Cygnus, located 570 light-years from Earth. It lies less than half a degree southeast of ρ Cygni. W Cygni is, at times, a naked eye star but it was not given a Bayer or Flamsteed designation. It has been proposed as a binary star system with a hotter main sequence companion, but this has not been confirmed.

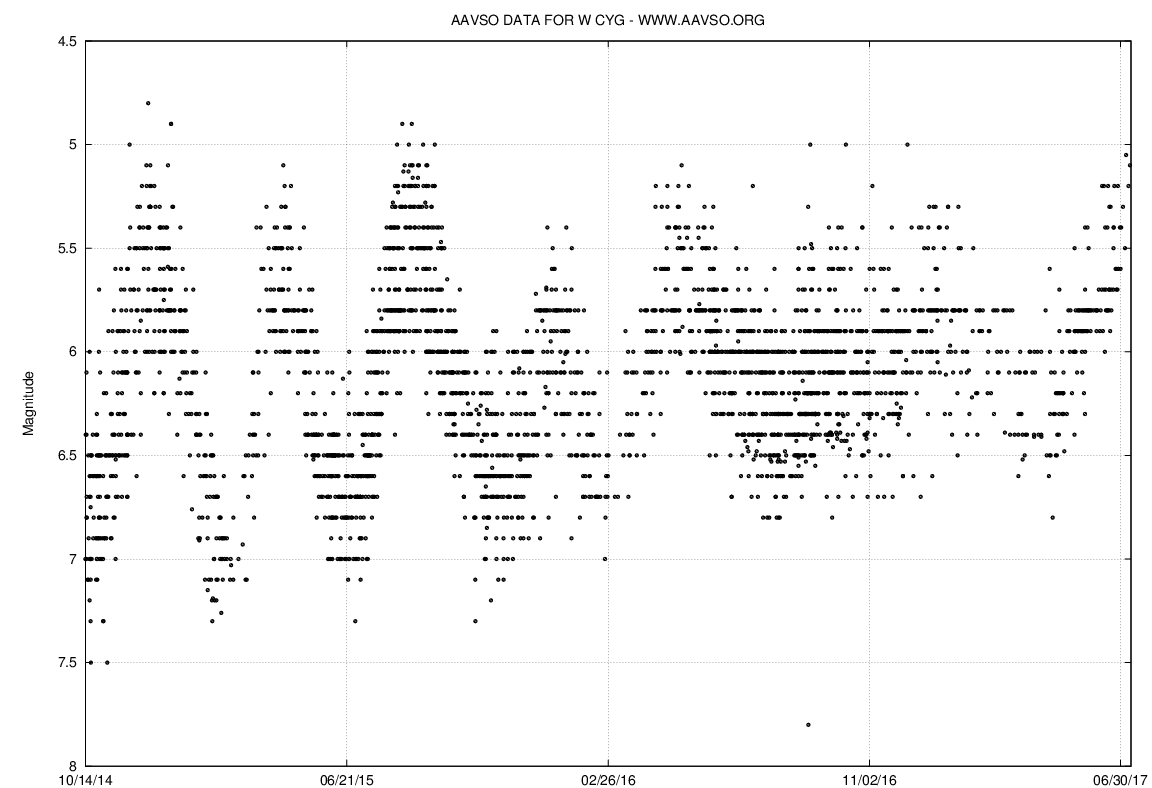
Visual light curve of W Cygni from 2014 to 2017

W Cygni was discovered to be variable by John Ellard Gore, and first published in 1885. It has a maximum magnitude of 5.10 and a minimum magnitude 6.83. The star is catalogued as having a primary period of 131.7 days, but shows variations with a variety of periods around 131 days as well as 234 days. It is believed to be pulsating in the first overtone. There is some evidence of additional very slow and small variations in the light curve on a time scale of 3,000–5,000 days.

This star is an aging red giant on the asymptotic giant branch (AGB). Its spectral type ranges between M4e and M6e, and it shows possible elevated levels of Technetium. The masses of AGB stars are poorly known, but using the pulsation properties of W Cygni, it mass is calculated to be slightly less than the sun's. It has expanded to 227 times the girth of the Sun and is radiating 5,888 times the Sun's luminosity from its swollen photosphere at an effective temperature of 3,373 K.
