= U Orionis =

Variable star in the constellation Orion

- Location of U Orionis (circled)

Observation data Epoch J2000.0 Equinox ICRS
- Constellation: Orion
- Right ascension: 05^{h} 55^{m} 49.17076^{s}
- Declination: +20° 10′ 30.6779″
- Apparent magnitude (V): 4.8 - 13.0

Characteristics
- Spectral type: M6e-M9.5e
- B−V color index: +2.07
- Variable type: Mira

Astrometry
Parallax (π)	3.4924±0.1820 mas
Distance	930 ± 50 ly (290 ± 10 pc)

Details
Mass	0.88 M_{☉}
Radius	370±96 R_{☉}
Luminosity	7,000 L_{☉}
Surface gravity (log g)	−0.44 cgs
Temperature	2,641 K
Metallicity [Fe/H]	0.54 dex

Other designations
- U Ori, BD+20°1171a, HD 39816, HIP 28041, HR 2063, SAO 77730

Database references
SIMBAD	data

U Orionis (abbreviated U Ori) is a Mira-type variable star in the constellation Orion. It is a classical long period variable star that has been well observed for over 120 years.

== Discovery ==
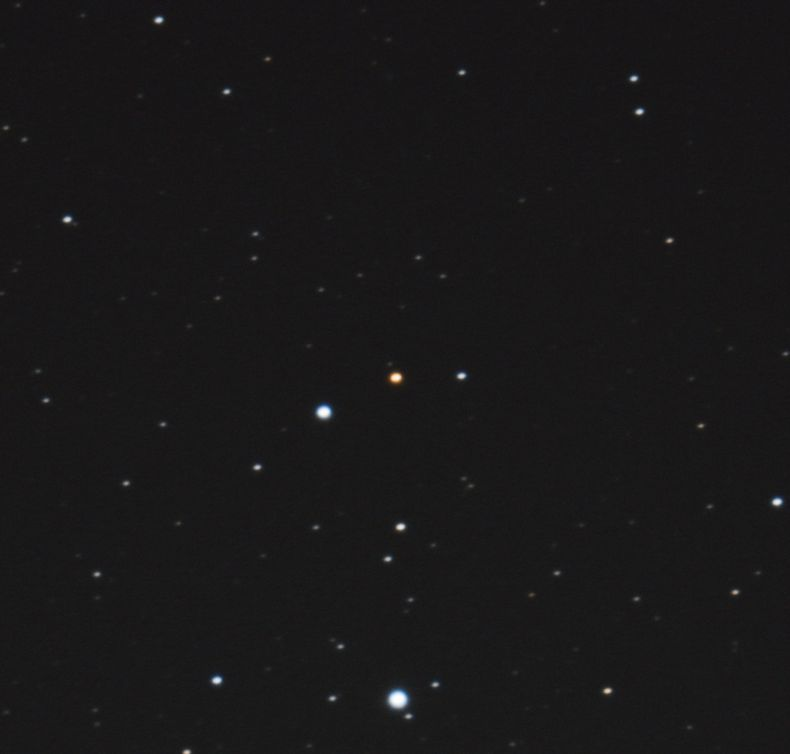
U Orionis in the center of the image at approx visual mag. 12 on February 5th 2017

It was discovered on 1885 December 13 by J.E. Gore and initially it was thought to be a nova in the early stages of decline (Gore's Nova and NOVA Ori 1885 as still listed in SIMBAD), but a spectrum taken at Harvard showed features similar to that of Mira. Thus U Orionis became the first long period variable to be identified by a photograph of its spectrum.

== Location ==
U Orionis lies less than half a degree east of the small-amplitude variable star χ^{1} Orionis and less than an arc-minute from the much fainter eclipsing variable UW Orionis. χ^{1} Orionis is slightly brighter than U Orionis at its brightest maximum, while UW Orionis is more than a thousand times fainter, similar to U Orionis at minimum.

== Stellar parameters ==
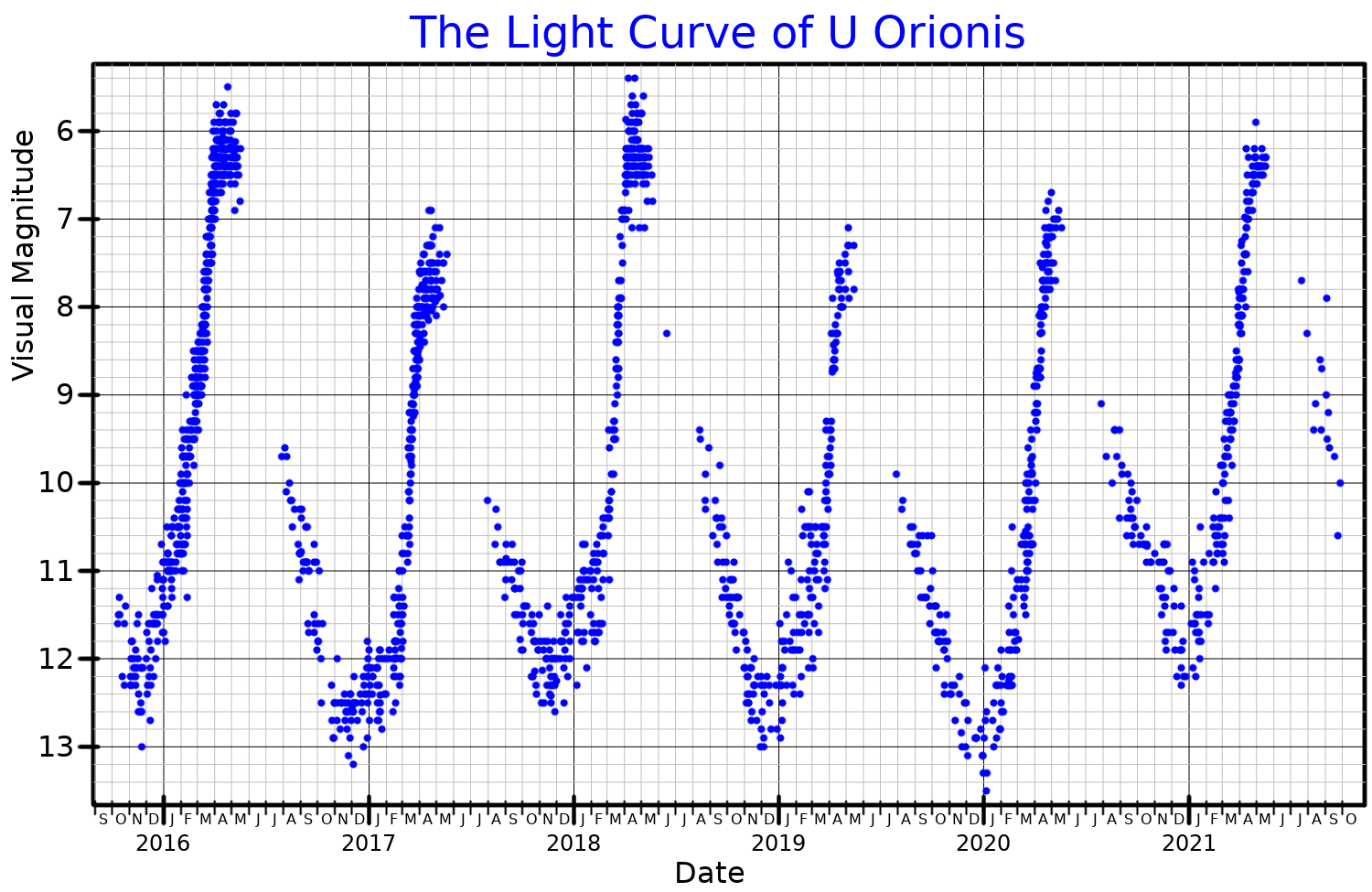
The visual band light curve of U Orionis, from AAVSO data

The star has a low effective temperature (variable with the pulsations, but roughly 2,700 K), a large and bloated radius of 370 R_{☉}, and a high luminosity, 7,000 times higher than the Sun. If the Sun were replaced with U Orionis, its radius would extend beyond Mars's orbital zone (about 1.7 astronomical units).

== Possible planetary system ==
According to Rudnitskij, a 12- to 15-year "super-periodicity" has been observed. The author infers such periodicity could coincide with the revolution period of an invisible companion, probably planetary. So far no clear hint of planetary objects has been detected.
