= John Ellard Gore =

Irish astronomer and author

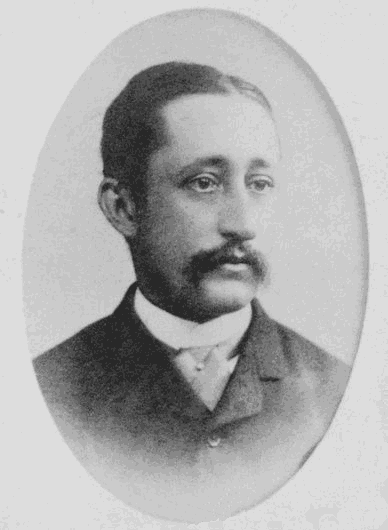
- John Ellard Gore
- Born: 1 June 1845; Athlone, County Westmeath, Ireland
- Died: 18 July 1910 (aged 65); Grafton Street, Dublin, Ireland
- Education: Trinity College, Dublin
- Scientific career
- Fields: Astronomy

John Ellard Gore (1 June 1845 – 18 July 1910) was an Irish amateur astronomer and prolific author, and a founding member of the British Astronomical Association. He was mainly interested in variable stars of which he discovered several, most notably W Cygni in 1884, U Orionis in 1885, and independently discovered Nova Persei. In 2009, the IAU named a lunar impact crater after Gore.

== Early life ==
Gore was born in Athlone, County Westmeath, in 1845, the eldest son of the Venerable John Ribton Gore and Frances Brabazon Ellard. He had 3 brothers and one sister. The Gore family descended from Sir Paul Gore, 1st Baronet and John's great grandfather was Sir Arthur Gore, 1st Baronet. He studied at Trinity College and received a diploma in Civil Engineering in 1865.

== Professional career ==
Gore worked as a railway engineer in Ireland for over two years before being appointed as an assistant engineer with the Indian Public Works Department on the Sirhind Canal project. In 1877 he returned to Ireland on two years leave of absence and lived in Ballysadare County Sligo with his father. In 1879, he retired after 11 years of service with a pension and after the death of his father in 1894, moved to Dublin where he spent the rest of his life devoted to astronomy.

== Astronomy ==
Gore had no formal training in astronomy, and began to study the sky while working in India. While there, he relied on his naked eyes, binoculars, a three-inch telescope and a ten centimeter telescope on an equatorial mount. His first book "Southern Stellar Objects for Small Telescopes" was published in India in 1877.

On his return to Ireland in 1877, he used a three-inch telescope and binoculars. He set up an observatory in Sligo, and later set up at 3 Northumberland Street, Dublin. His greatest contribution was his studies of double and variable stars, and he published catalogues of variables and binary stars.

Gore died on 18 July 1910 when struck by a horse and car whilst crossing Grafton St., Dublin.

== Books ==
- Gore, John Ellard (1877). Southern Stellar Objects for Small Telescopes. Lodiana. p. 144.
- Gore, John Ellard (1888). Planetary and Stellar Studies. Roper & Drowley. p. 280.
- Gore, John Ellard (1890). Astronomical Lessons. Sutton, Drowley & Co. p. 150.
- Gore, John Ellard (1891). Star Groups. Crosby Lockwood & Son. p. 136.
- Gore, John Ellard (1893). The Visible Universe. Crosby Lockwood & Son. p. 472.
- Gore, John Ellard (1893). An Astronomical Glossary. Crosby Lockwood & Son. p. 210.
- Gore, John Ellard (1894). The Worlds of Space. A D Innes & Co. p. 376.
- Gore, John Ellard (1904). Studies in Astronomy. Chatto & Windus. p. 372.
- Gore, John Ellard (1907). Astronomical Essays. Chatto & Windus. p. 376.
- Gore, John Ellard (1909). Astronomical Curiosities. Chatto & Windus. p. 392.

== Legacy ==
In 2009, the IAU named a lunar impact crater located on the lunar near side near the northern pole after Gore.
