= Ben Bussey =

American planetary scientist

Ben J. Bussey
- Occupation: Planetary scientist
- Spouse: Cari Corrigan

Ben J. Bussey is an American planetary scientist.

He earned a PhD in planetary geology at University College London, England. In 2001, during his post-doctorate work at the University of Hawaii, he joined the ANSMET (Antarctic Search for METeorites) expedition to recover meteorites from the Antarctic glaciers. He worked at the Lunar and Planetary Institute in Houston and the European Space Agency, before joining the Johns Hopkins University Applied Physics Laboratory and becoming a senior staff scientist at that facility. Bussey later joined National Aeronautics and Space Administration (NASA) as the Chief Exploration Scientist of its Human Exploration & Operations Mission Directorate.

Bussey is specialized in the remote sensing of the surfaces of planets. He participated in the Near-Earth Asteroid Rendezvous-Shoemaker (NEAR) mission as a research scholar at Northwestern University. He co-authored an atlas of the Moon based on data and images from the Clementine mission, which allowed the team, which Bussey led, to identify the best location to place a Moon base. He has a particular interest in the lunar poles, using the Clementine images to locate crater cold traps for hydrogen deposits and mapping the peaks of eternal light. The team was able to develop a map of the Moon's north pole, making it possible to identify the percentage of time that the surface is illuminated by the Sun during the Lunar day. This provided the information that yielded possible locations for future lunar habitat.

Bussey was awarded the NASA Group achievement award for his contribution the Near-Earth Asteroid Rendezvous mission.

He is married to Cari Corrigan.

== Bibliography ==
- The Clementine Atlas of the Moon, Ben Bussey and Paul D. Spudis, 2004, ISBN 0-521-81528-2.
- Bussey, Ben; Spudis, Paul (2004). "Small Spacecraft Exploration of the Moon". Acta Astronautica. 55 (3–9): 637–641. Bibcode:2004AcAau..55..637B. doi:10.1016/j.actaastro.2004.05.036.
