= Florey (crater) =

Crater on the Moon

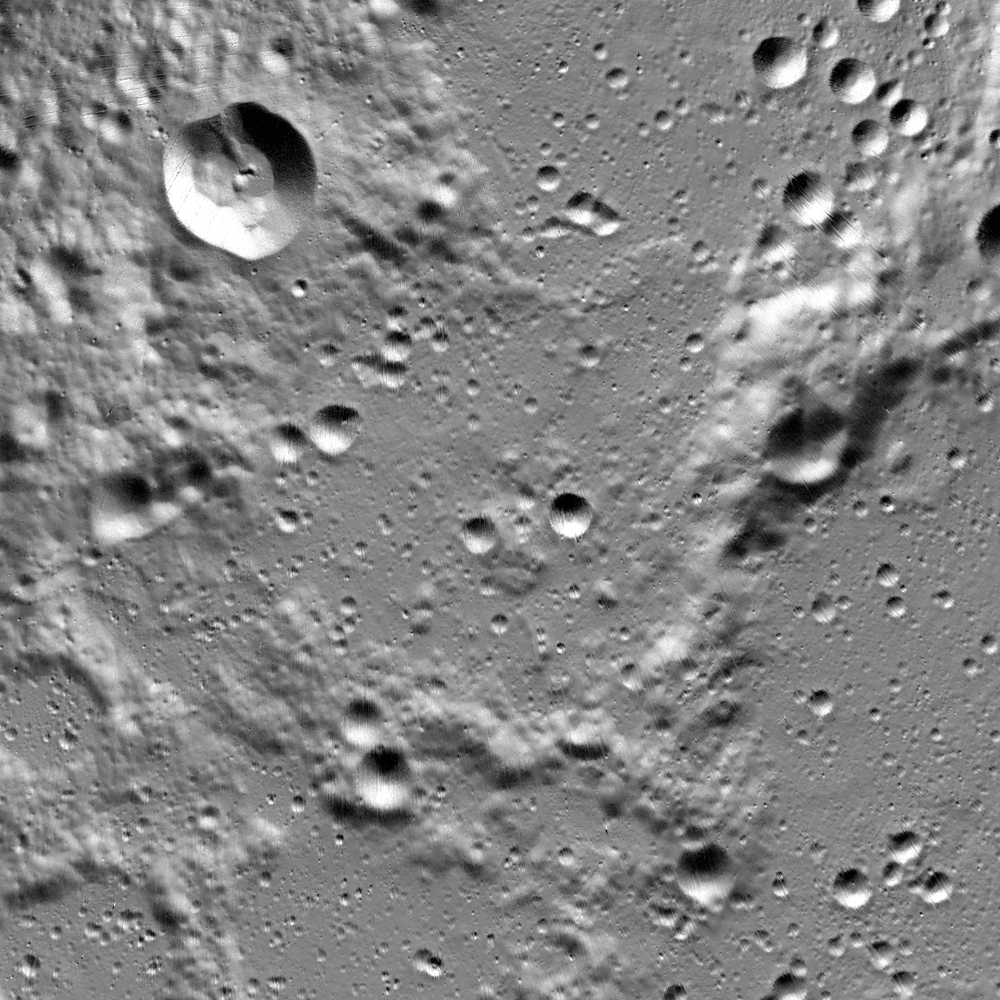
- LRO altimeter image; Florey is the heavily eroded formation at center
- Coordinates: 87.04°N 19.75°W
- Diameter: 69.06 km (42.91 mi)
- Eponym: Howard Florey

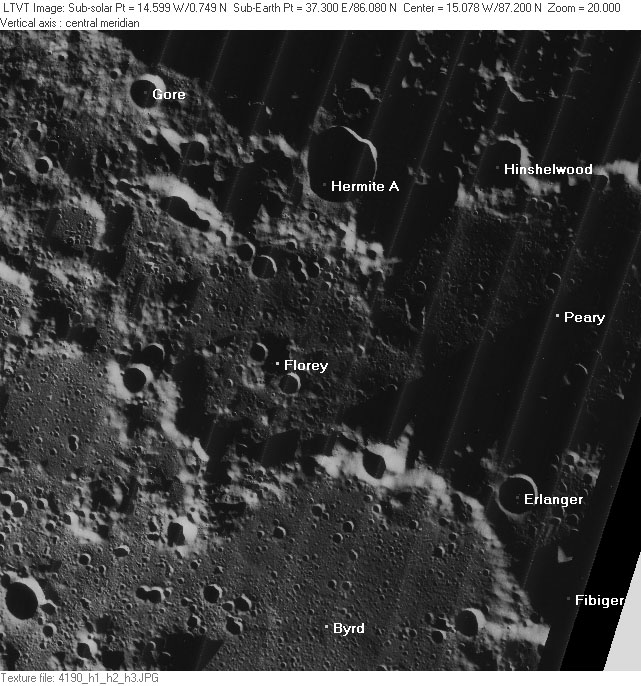
Labeled photo showing location of several craters, Florey in the center

Florey is a heavily degraded lunar impact crater on the near side of the Moon, near the northern pole. It is directly adjacent to Byrd crater (diameter of 94 km) to the southeast and Peary crater (diameter of 73 km) to the north. Florey is joined to Peary by a wide gap, providing a relatively flat, traverseable surface extending nearly 130 km to near the north pole. At the south end of Florey is a permanently shadowed region spanning an area of 27.36 km^{2}.

This crater is named after Australian-born British pathologist and Nobel Prize winner Howard Florey (1898-1968). Its designation was officially adopted by the International Astronomical Union in 2009.
