= Catherine Corrigan =

American scientist

Catherine Margaret Corrigan
- Born: 1972 (age 53–54)
- Other names: Cari Corrigan
- Education: PhD, Case Western Reserve University, 2004
- Spouse: Ben Bussey
- Scientific career
- Fields: Meteoritics
- Institutions: National Museum of Natural History
- Thesis: Carbonate minerals in martian meteorite Allan Hills 84001: Implications for environmental conditions on ancient Mars (2004)
- Doctoral advisor: Ralph Harvey

Catherine Margaret Corrigan (born 1972), often known as Cari Corrigan, is an American scientist best known as a curator of the meteorite collection at the Smithsonian Institution. She is a scientist in the Department of Mineral Science at the National Museum of Natural History.

== Education ==
Corrigan obtained a Bachelor of Science in 1995 and a Master of Science in 1998, both in Geology at Michigan State University. Her master's thesis was titled The Composition of Impact Breccias from the Chicxulub Impact Crater, Yucatan Peninsula, Yucatan, Mexico. She later earned a Ph.D in Planetary Science at Case Western Reserve University in 2004 studying carbonate minerals in Martian meteorite Allan Hills 84001 which suggest the sample came from a surface on Mars that underwent multiple distinct exposures to liquid water, rather than long term exposure in a body of water.

== Career ==
=== Field work ===
In 2001 and 2004, Corrigan travelled to Antarctica as a member of ANSMET (Antarctic Search for Meteorites) teams. She is a co-author of 35 seasons of U.S. Antarctic meteorites (1976-2010): a pictorial guide to the collection (2014) ISBN 1-118-79838-4 (OCLC Number: 879851951).

=== Research and curation ===
Cari Corrigan was a postdoctoral fellow at National Museum of Natural History and Applied Physics Lab.

In 2004, Corrigan was instrumental in the initial examination and classification of newly discovered Martian meteorite MIL03346, only the seventh known Nakhlite.

In early 2008, Corrigan was hired to classify meteorites and curate the meteorite collection for the Smithsonian National Museum of Natural History. As a curator, she is responsible for classifying meteorite samples collected in Antarctica for the Antarctic Meteorite Newsletter.

=== Other professional work ===
Corrigan helps process and analyze images from the Mars Exploration Rover project's Opportunity rover.

Corrigan is a member of the science team working with Moon Zoo, a Zooniverse citizen science project. She is interested in linking lunar meteorites to impact craters on the lunar surface.

On behalf of the Meteoritical Society, Corrigan is editor of the society's contributions to Elements magazine.

== Honors ==
- The central main-belt asteroid 9924 Corrigan, discovered by American astronomer Schelte Bus at the Australian Siding Spring Observatory in 1981, was named after her on 13 April 2017 (M.P.C. 103976).
