= Whipple (surname) =

Whipple is a surname. Notable people with the surname include:

- Abraham Whipple (1733–1819), American Revolutionary War naval commander
- A.B.C. Whipple (1918–2013), American journalist, editor, historian and author
- Allen Whipple (1881–1963), American surgeon
- Amiel Weeks Whipple (1818–1863), American military engineer and surveyor
- Beverly Whipple (1941–2026), American author, sexologist and academic
- Charles W. Whipple (1805–1856), American lawyer, politician and Chief Justice of the Michigan Supreme Court
- Chris Whipple, journalist, author, documentary film producer
- Clara Whipple (1887–1932), silent film actress
- Daley E. Whipple (1915–2002), American politician
- Diane Whipple (1967–2001), American victim of a fatal dog attack
- Dinah Whipple (1760–1846), leader in Portsmouth, New Hampshire's free Black community
- Dorothy Whipple (1893–1966), English writer of popular fiction
- Edwin Percy Whipple (1819–1886), American essayist and critic
- Frances Harriet Whipple Green McDougall, née Whipple (1805–1878), abolitionist, poet, novelist, editor, botanist, spiritualist medium, and advocate of women's, voters', and workers' rights
- Francis John Welsh Whipple (1876–1943), British mathematician and meteorologist
- Fred Lawrence Whipple (1906–2004), American astronomer
- George Whipple (1878–1976), American physician, biomedical researcher, Nobel Prize winner
- George C. Whipple (1866–1924), American civil engineer and expert in the field of sanitary microbiology, inventor of Whipple's index and co-founder of the Harvard School of Public Health
- Gwen Whipple (born 1966), American civic leader and educator
- Guy Montrose Whipple (1876–1941), American educational psychologist
- Henry Benjamin Whipple (1822–1901), first Episcopal bishop of Minnesota, US
- Inez Whipple Wilder (born Inez Luanne Whipple, 1871–1929), American zoologist
- John Adams Whipple (1822–1891), American inventor and early photographer
- Joseph Reed Whipple (1842–1912), American hotel proprietor
- Joseph Whipple (1662–1746), merchant in the Colony of Rhode Island and Providence Plantations and militia colonel
- Joseph Whipple Jr. (1687–1750), merchant and deputy governor of the Colony of Rhode Island and Providence Plantations, son of the above
- Joseph Whipple III (1725–1761), merchant and deputy governor of Rhode Island and Providence Plantations, son of the above
- Mark Whipple (born 1957), American football player and coach
- Mary Margaret Whipple (born 1940), American politician
- Maurine Whipple (1903–1992), American novelist
- Philippa Whipple, British barrister and judge
- Prince Whipple (1750–1796), African-American slave and later freedman, participant in the American Revolution
- Robert Stewart Whipple (1871–1953), businessman in the British scientific instrument trade, collector of science books and scientific instruments and author
- Sam Whipple (1960–2002), American actor
- Squire Whipple (1804–1888), American civil engineer known as the father of iron bridge building in America
- Thomas Whipple Jr. (1787–1835), American politician
- Walter Whipple (born 1943), translator
- William Whipple (1730–1785), signatory of the United States Declaration of Independence
- William Denison Whipple (1826–1902), brigadier general in the Union army during the American Civil War
- William Whipple Jr. (1909–2007), brigadier general in the U.S. army
- William M. Whipple (?–1918), member of the Arizona House of Representatives, father of W. D. Whipple
- W. D. Whipple, state senator from Arizona, son of William M. Whipple
