= Daley E. Whipple =

American politician

Member of the New Hampshire House of Representatives from the Cheshire 4th district
- In office 1972–1978

Personal details
- Born: June 28, 1915
- Died: March 21, 2002 (aged 86)
- Party: Republican

Daley E. Whipple (June 28, 1915 – March 21, 2002) was an American politician. He served as a member for the Cheshire 4th district of the New Hampshire House of Representatives.
