= Whipple Lakes =

Body of water

Coordinates: 46°21.6′N 94°18.5′W

Whipple Lakes is a group of named lakes in Crow Wing County, in the U.S. state of Minnesota.

The group consists of Little Whipple Lake, Lower Whipple Lake, and Upper Whipple Lake. Whipple Lakes were named for Henry Benjamin Whipple, an Episcopal bishop noted for his work with Indians in the state.

== See also ==
- List of lakes in Minnesota
