= Peak of eternal light =

Hypothetical permanently sunlit point on an astronomical body

A peak of eternal light (PEL) is a hypothetical point on the surface of an astronomical body that is always in sunlight. Such a peak must have high latitude, high elevation, and be on a body with very small axial tilt. PELs would be advantageous for space exploration and colonization, because an electrical device located there would receive solar power regardless of the time of day or day of the year, and because of a relatively stable temperature range.

The existence of such peaks was first postulated by Wilhelm Beer and Johann Heinrich von Mädler in 1837. The pair said about the lunar polar mountains: "...many of these peaks have (with the exception of eclipses caused by the Earth) eternal sunshine". These polar peaks were later mentioned by Camille Flammarion in 1879, who speculated that there may exist pics de lumière éternelle at the poles of the Moon.

Detailed lunar topography collected by the Lunar Reconnaissance Orbiter (LRO) suggests that no points on the Moon receive perpetual light during both the winter and summer. However, there are points on crater rims which have very extended periods of sunlight.

== On the Moon ==
=== Orbital survey ===
The ESA SMART-1, NASA Clementine and JAXA SELENE spacecraft made maps of the lunar poles that have been used to identify sites receiving eternal light. The orbiting craft monitored the lighting at the poles and looked for seasonal variations, as well as mapping the relief so that peaks of eternal light could be identified topographically.

The Lunar Reconnaissance Orbiter then took a data set including 24,000 wide-area camera and 31,500 narrow-angle camera images within 2° of the poles. These were used to construct high-resolution maps that reveal illuminated terrain under varying lighting conditions.

=== Lunar north pole ===
Based on images from the Clementine lunar mission, a team from Johns Hopkins University suggested that four locations along the rim of the Peary crater are candidates for peaks of eternal light. This crater lies near the north pole of the Moon. Clementine's images were taken during the northern summer, however, and did not address illumination of these peaks during the winter, when the Sun is below the horizon. Further data from the SELENE spaceprobe determined that one peak at Peary Crater receives sunlight for 89% of a lunar year.

=== Lunar south pole ===
Lunar South Pole: four peaks are identified which are illuminated more than 80% of the time

The lunar south pole is situated in a huge depression, leading to 16 km altitude differences over the region. Careful analysis of imagery and topographic conditions on the lunar South Pole by teams from NASA and the ESA revealed a small number of illuminated ridges within 15 km of the pole, each of them much like an island of no more than a few hundred meters across in an ocean of eternal darkness, where a lander could receive near-permanent lighting (for ~70–90% of the southern lunar winter, and likely all of the southern lunar summer).

The Malapert Mountain region, on the rim of the Malapert crater 122 km from the lunar south pole on the Earth-facing side, may also have high levels of illumination. One study estimates the Malapert Mountain region to receive less than full sunlight 11% of the time. Sunlight exposure varies by year due to the Moon's orbit being 1.5° off-plane with the Sun. 2005 estimates of sunlight coverage of the Malapert Mountain region found only six partially lit or unlit events that year: 0–159 hours of complete sunset per event and 41–199 hours of complete or partial sunset per event. A later study using a combination of both Clementine imaging and SELENE topographical data estimated only 74% of full sunlight for the year 2020. This study found that two points only ~8 km from each other along a straight ridge extending from Shackleton Crater at the Lunar South Pole are illuminated a combined ~94% of a lunar year. This is because both points cast shadows upon each other during different times of the lunar year, and only a few times of darkness occur when further peaks throw shadows over both of these points simultaneously.

The data set from Lunar Reconnaissance Orbiter shows that some sites on the rim of Shackelton remain illuminated for 94% of a lunar year. The longest all three Shackleton outposts are eclipsed is 43 h.

Lighting conditions for specific southern lunar pole coordinates
Approximate placement near a named feature	Lunar coordinates	Illuminated time fraction			Notes
Approximate placement near a named feature	Lunar coordinates	Over lunar year 2020	Minimum per lunar day	Maximum per lunar day	Notes
On Shackleton Crater ridge: point A	89.68°S; 166.0°W	81%	44%	98%	Even during the worst lunar day the longest period of darkness is ~7 Earth days, with shortest periods of light between darkness of ~3 Earth days
Peak near Shackleton Crater ridge: point B	89.44°S; 141.8°W	82%	56%	100%	During worst lunar day the longest period of darkness is ~12 Earth days; has 4.5 lunar days of continuous lighting in lunar summer and only 4.5 Earth days of total darkness time in 8 lunar days.
on De Gerlache Crater ridge: point C	88.71°S; 68.7°W	85%	64%	98%	Has shortest period of darkness of only ~6 days, followed by ~7 days of intermittent light and darkness periods.
Peak close to Shackleton Crater ridge: point D	88.79°S; 124.5°E	86%	58%	100%	5 lunar days of continuous light, ~7 lunar days lighting with only ~2 Earth days of darkness, ~12 Earth days periods of darkness or near darkness during lunar winter.
on Malapert Mountain: point M1	86.04°S; 2.7°E	74%	54%	95%	
on Malapert Mountain: point M2	86.00°S; 2.9°W	74%	58%	90%	

=== In culture ===
- Moon Temple planned for a peak of eternal light on Shackleton crater's rim to address future needs (such as spiritual accommodation) of people living on the Moon
  - 2017 — European Space Agency artist in residence Jorge Mañes Rubio created initial design
  - 2018 — corresponding artifacts were created by the ESA Advanced Concepts Team

== See also ==
- Crater of eternal darkness
- Extraterrestrial sky
