= Byrd (lunar crater) =

Crater on the Moon

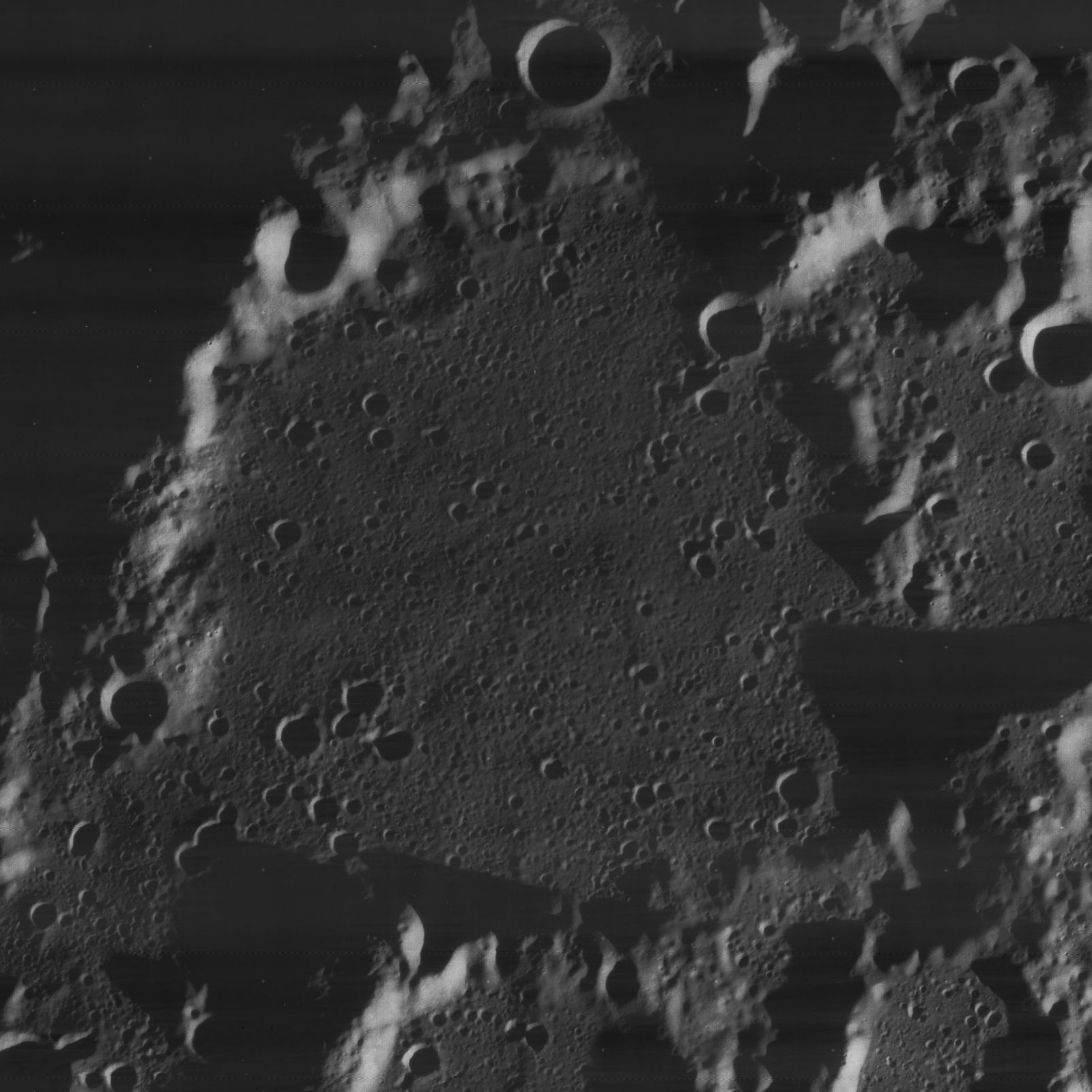
- Lunar Orbiter 4 image of Byrd (center) with Gioia at bottom
- Coordinates: 85.43°N 10.07°E
- Diameter: 97.49 km (60.58 mi)
- Depth: Unknown
- Colongitude: 10° at sunrise
- Eponym: Richard E. Byrd

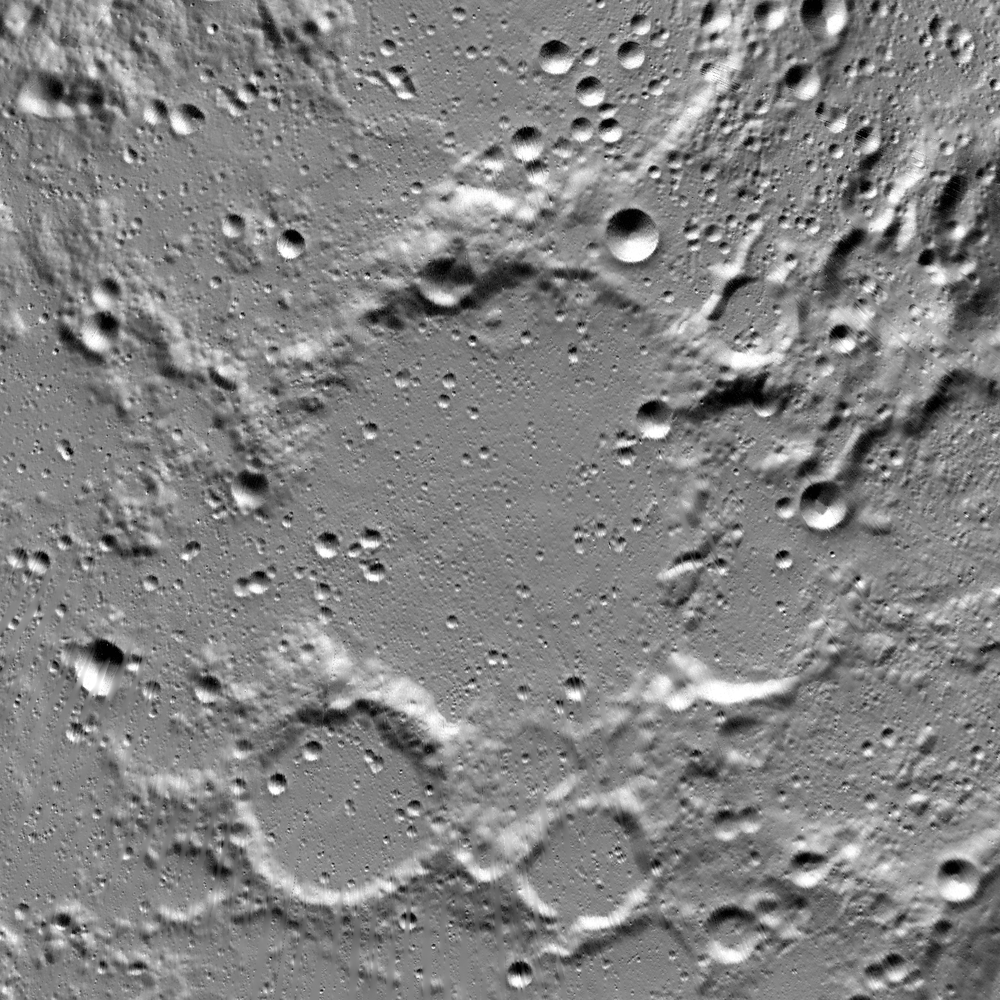
Topographic map of Byrd (centre), from Lunar Reconnaissance Orbiter's laser altimetry data

Byrd is an irregular lunar impact crater that is located near the north pole of the Moon. The north rim of Byrd is nearly connected to the crater Peary, a formation that is adjacent to the pole. The smaller crater Gioia is attached to the remains of the southwest rim.

Based on its impact record, this crater dates to 3.88 Ga ago. The rim of Byrd is worn and eroded, with sections distorted by intruding crater rims along the perimeter. As a result, the crater interior is longer in the north–south direction than it is wide. There is a gap in the western rim, and the southern rim is now little more than a low ridge on the surface.

Some time after the original impact the crater interior was covered in lava flows, leaving a nearly flat surface that is marked only by tiny craterlets. These impacts include craters dating from the Mare Orientale impact. There is no central peak at the midpoint of the interior and no ridges of significance.

This crater is named after American aviator and polar explorer Richard E. Byrd (1888–1957). His name was introduced into lunar nomenclature by David W. G. Arthur and Ewen Whitaker with the Rectified Lunar Atlas (1963). Its designation was officially adopted by the International Astronomical Union in 1964.

== Satellite craters ==
By convention these features are identified on lunar maps by placing the letter on the side of the crater midpoint that is closest to Byrd.

Byrd	Coordinates	Diameter, km
C	84.35°N 28.34°E	34
D	85.52°N 33.41°E	24
