= Whipple Run =

Ohioan stream

Coordinates: 38°31′07″N 81°24′59″W

Whipple Run is a stream located entirely within Washington County, Ohio.

According to tradition, Whipple Run was named for Abraham Whipple, an explorer who fell in the water while crossing over a fallen tree.

== See also ==
- List of rivers of Ohio
