= William Whipple Jr. =

American military officer (1909–2007)

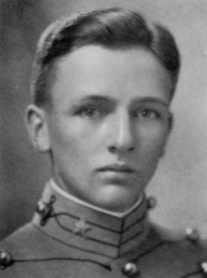
- As a West Point cadet
- Born: February 4, 1909; Louisiana, US
- Died: August 23, 2007 (aged 98); Princeton, New Jersey, US
- Burial place: Arlington National Cemetery
- Education: United States Military Academy; University of Oxford; Princeton University
- Occupation: Military officer

Signature
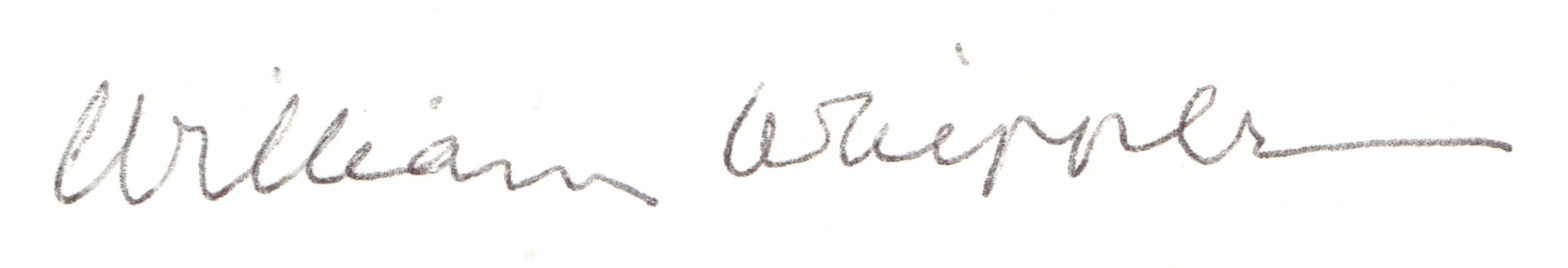

William Whipple Jr. (February 4, 1909 – August 23, 2007) was an American military officer and engineer. A brigadier general of the U.S. Army, he played a significant role in the development of the Marshall Plan in the aftermath of World War II.

== Early life and education ==
Whipple was born in Louisiana on February 4, 1909, the second of five children to William Sr.—a New York engineer and Massachusetts Institute of Technology graduate—and grew up in the Cinclare Sugar Mill Historic District. He graduated from the United States Military Academy in 1930, and majored in philosophy and economics at Oxford, receiving a Rhodes Scholarship. He later attended Princeton University. In 1931 and 1932, he trained with the Royal Engineers.

== World War II ==
During World War II, Whipple worked in the Allied Force Headquarters under Dwight D. Eisenhower, where he planned battles in Europe. Following the war, he worked in the Lucius D. Clay Kaserne. There, he helped develop post-war policy German, and advicated that the policy should rebuild Germany instead of punish it; this led to the Marshall Plan replacing the Morgenthau Plan. He returned to the United States in 1947, ranked colonel.

== Later career and later life ==
A member of the American Society of Civil Engineers, he built floodgates on the Missouri River before serving in the military. Returning to the United States, he planned a development in the Columbia River drainage basin. He served as an engineer in the Southwest Division of the United States Army Corps of Engineers.

He retired from the military in 1960, later aiding in construction of the 1964 New York World's Fair. He went on to find work at the New Jersey Water Resources Research Institute of Rutgers University, the New Jersey Department of Environmental Protection from 1982, and the Greeley-Polhemus Group.

Known for his work on water resources, he authored over 100 books and articles on the topic. He was also an attendant to the Trinity Church in Princeton. He died on August 23, 2007, aged 98, in Princeton, New Jersey, and is buried at Arlington National Cemetery.
