= Peary (crater) =

Crater on the Moon

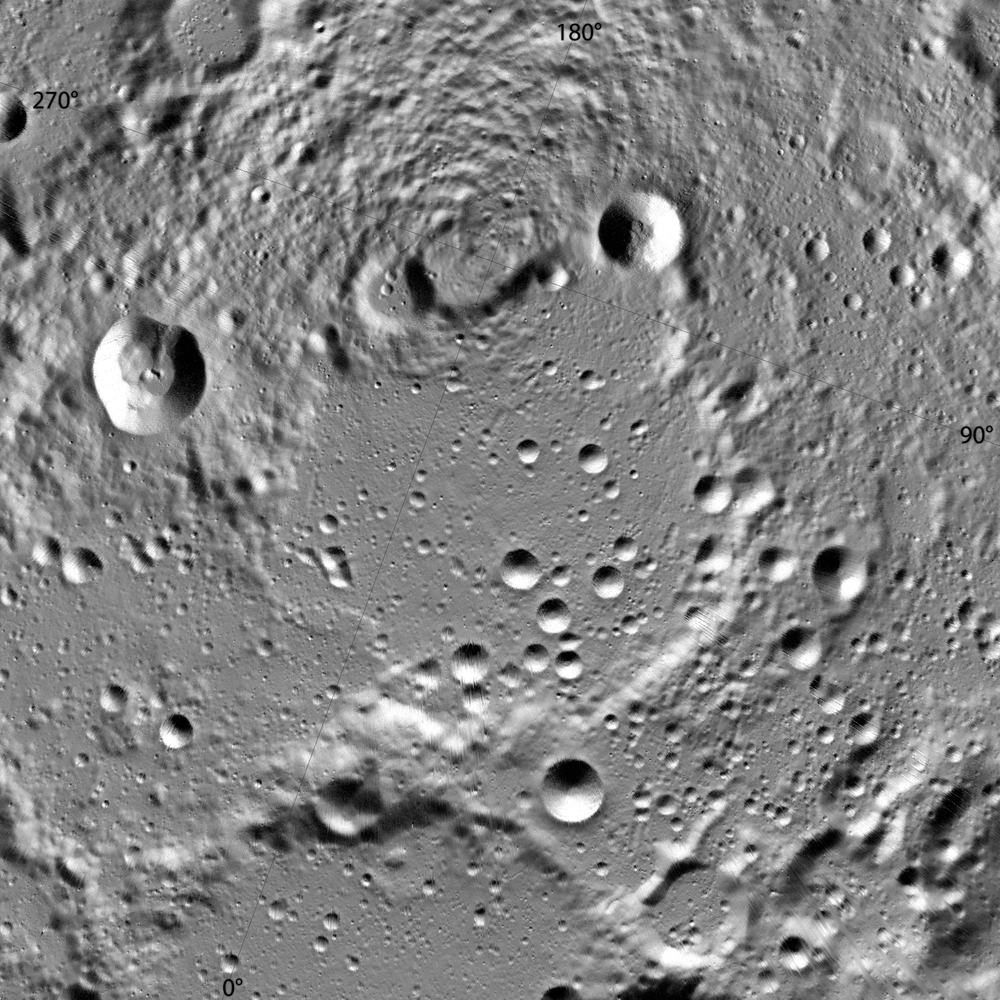
- Shaded relief map, based on the LRO laser altimetry data. Peary is the large crater at center; north pole is situated on its northern (upper) rim
- Coordinates: 88.63°N 24.4°E
- Diameter: 79 km
- Depth: 1.5 km
- Colongitude: 25° at sunrise
- Eponym: Robert Peary

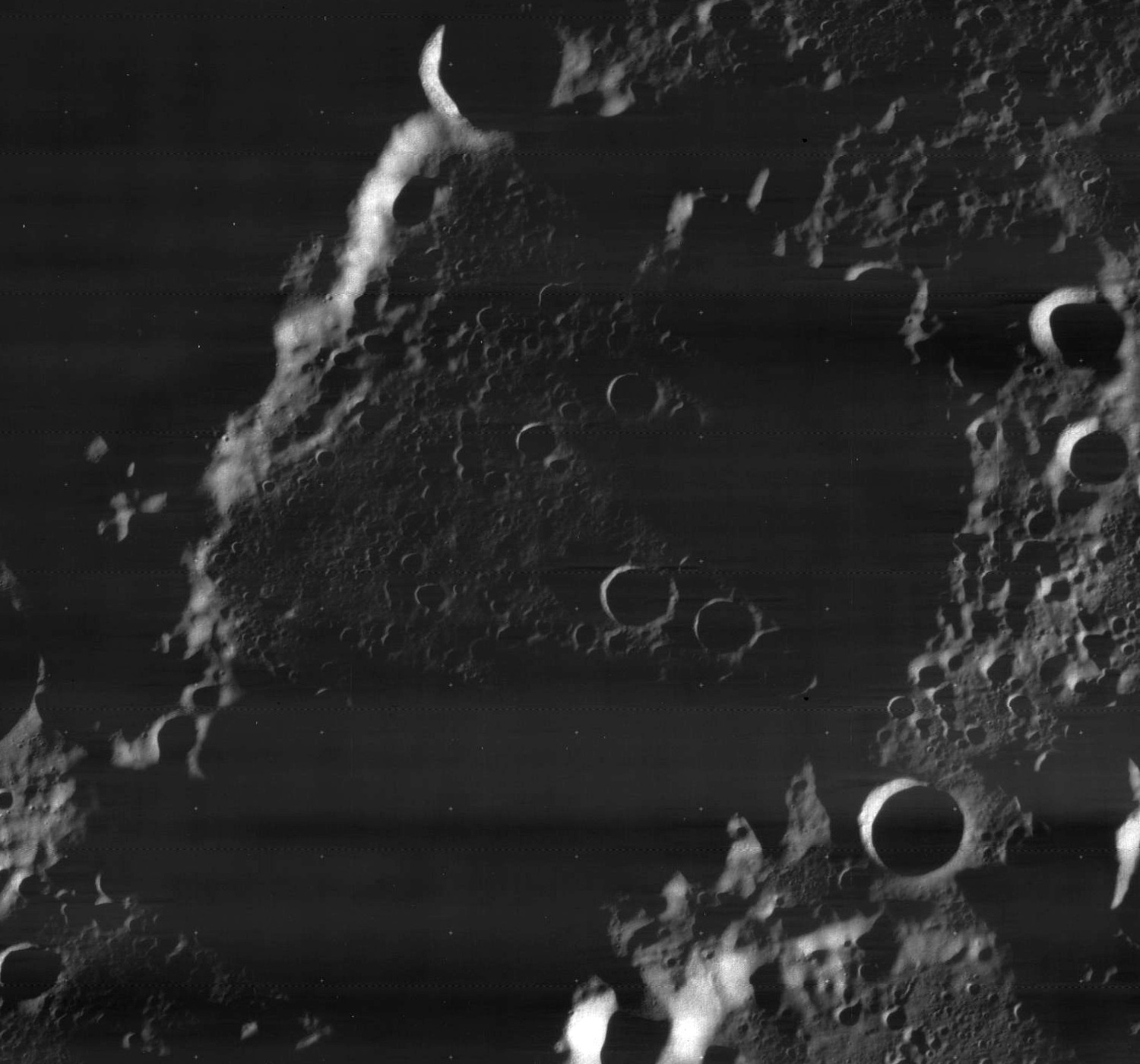
Lunar Orbiter 4 image

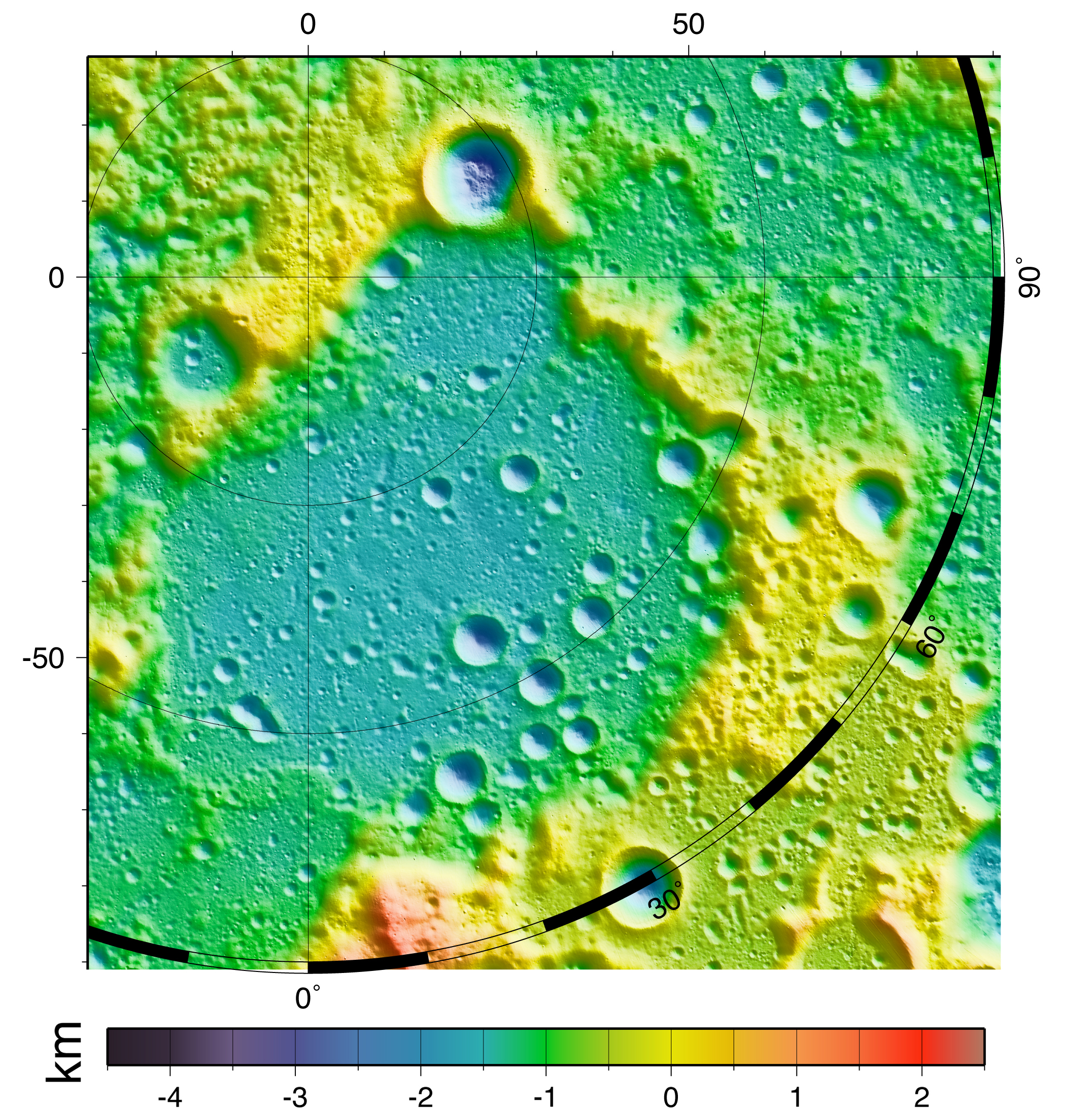
False color elevation map of Peary Crater, based on topographical data from the Lunar Reconnaissance Orbiter (LRO) laser altimeter.

Peary is the closest large lunar impact crater to the lunar north pole. At this latitude the crater interior receives little sunlight, and portions of the southernmost region of the crater floor remain permanently cloaked in shadow. From the Earth the crater appears on the northern lunar limb, and is seen from the side.

== Observation and etymology ==
Since Peary is located nearly on the limb of the Moon as viewed from Earth, high-quality images of the crater were not available until space probes started photographing the Moon; the first high-quality images came from the US Lunar Orbiter 4 spacecraft. Since it is located nearly at the lunar north pole, it was named after the American polar explorer Robert Peary (1856–1920).

== Physical features ==
Peary is nearly circular, with an outward bulge along the northeast rim. There is a gap in the southwestern rim, where it joins the slightly smaller crater Florey. The outer rim of Peary is worn and eroded, creating a rugged mountainous ring that produces long shadows across the crater floor. The crater floor itself is relatively flat, but is marked by several small craterlets, particularly in the southeastern half. The southern third of the interior remains cloaked in shadows, and so its features can be readily discerned only by means of ranging methods (for example, laser altimetry).

Because of the low sun angle, the average temperature on the crater floor of Peary is between 30 and 40 K, one of the coldest locations in the Solar System.

=== Illumination ===
In 2004, a team led by Dr Ben Bussey of Johns Hopkins University, using images taken by the Clementine mission, determined that four mountainous regions on the rim of Peary appeared to remain illuminated for the entire lunar day. These unnamed "peaks of eternal light" are due to the Moon's extremely small axial tilt, which also gives rise to permanent shadow at the bottoms of many polar craters. Clementine's images were taken during the northern lunar hemisphere's summer season, and more detailed lunar topography collected by the Lunar Reconnaissance Orbiter (LRO) showed that no points on the Moon receive perpetual light during both winter and summer.

The northern rim of Peary is considered a likely site for a future Moon base, due to this near-constant illumination, which would provide both a relatively stable temperature and a nearly uninterrupted solar power supply. It is also near permanently shadowed areas that may contain some quantity of frozen water.
