= William Denison Whipple =

Civil War Union Major General (1826–1902)

Bvt. Maj. Gen. William Denison Whipple
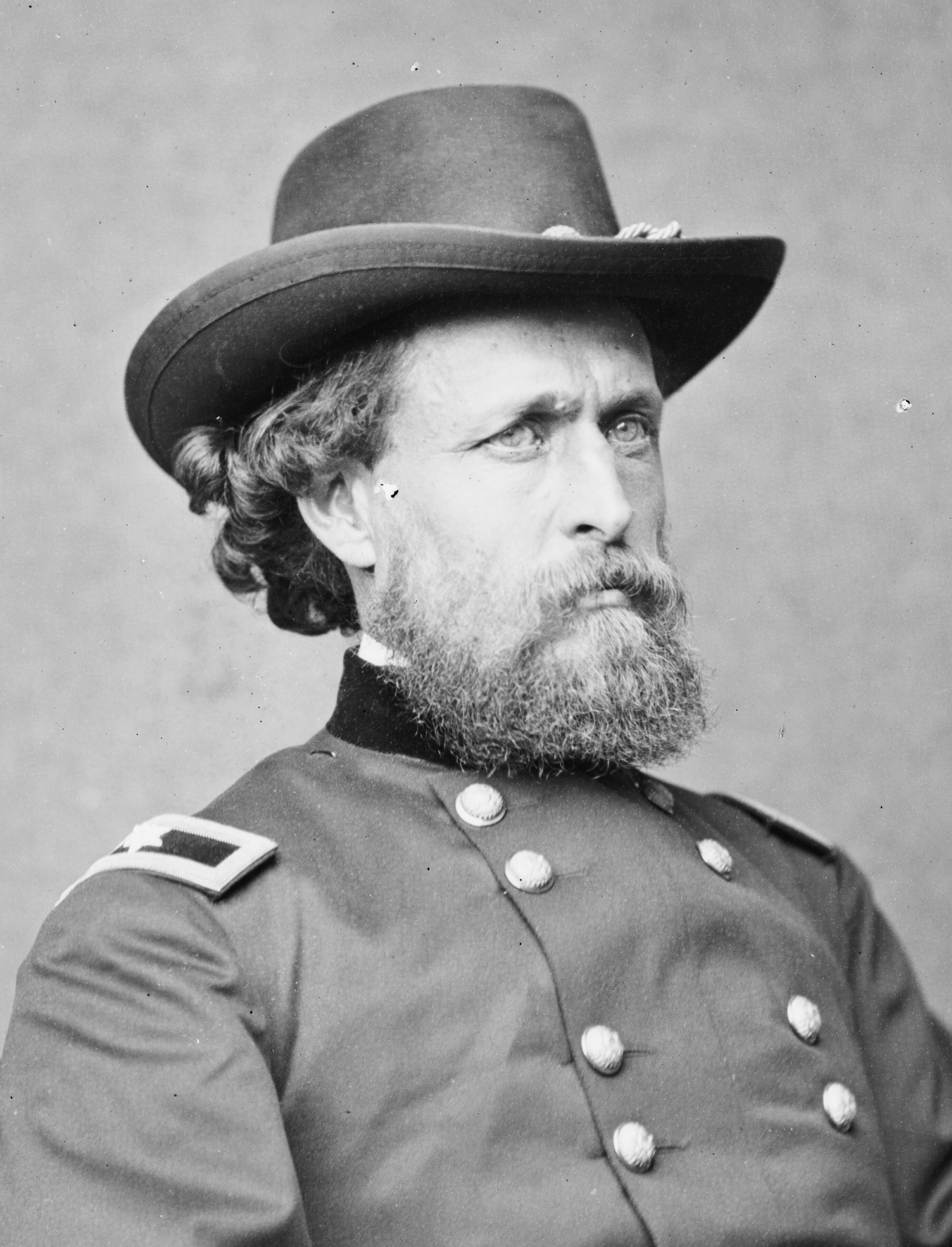
- Born: August 2, 1826; Nelson, New York
- Died: April 1, 1902 (aged 75); Manhattan, New York
- Burial place: Arlington National Cemetery
- Alma mater: West Point
- Spouse: Caroline Mary Cooke
- Children: 3
- Military career
- Allegiance: Union (American Civil War)
- Branch: United States Army Adjutant General's Corps
- Service years: 1851–1890
- Rank: Major General
- Conflicts: Yuma War; Gila Expedition; Navajo Wars; Second Battle of Fort Defiance; American Civil War; First Battle of Bull Run; Battle of Missionary Ridge

Signature
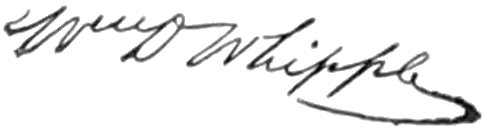

Bvt. Maj. Gen. William Denison Whipple (August 2, 1826 – April 1, 1902) was an officer of the U.S. Army who fought against the native Americans in the New Mexico Territory and served the Union during the American Civil War.

== Biography ==
Whipple was born in Nelson, New York on August 2, 1826, to Jerusha Whipple. He entered West Point in 1847 before graduating on July 1, 1851, and was assigned to the 3rd U.S. Infantry Regiment as a second lieutenant. During his time there he would be treated for phlegmon three times, catarrhs twice, diarrhea twice, and several other diseases. He graduated near the bottom of his class, but would go on to have a prominent career.

=== New Mexico Territory ===
In the spring of 1852, Whipple marched a detachment of recruits from Newport Barracks to Jefferson Barracks, joining a larger detachment and taking a steamer to Fort Leavenworth before going on to join the 3rd regiment in the New Mexico Territory.

Whipple married Caroline Mary Cooke, of Philadelphia, on December 16, 1854 while serving in the New Mexico Territory. They would have three children, Marion, Walter and Herbert.

He was promoted to first lieutenant on December 31, 1856, and served frontier duty across New Mexico until 1860. While there Whipple participated in the Gila Expedition of 1857 against the apaches, the Navajo conflict of 1858, from Fort Defiance, and the Second Battle of Fort Defiance on April 29, 1860. Whipple would also study Navajo vocabulary for the U.S. military over the course of his service there.

=== American Civil War ===
In 1860, Whipple's regiment was ordered to Texas where he would serve as a quartermaster in Indianola. He would remain there until the Twiggs agreement the following year. Whipple, still in Indianola, would try to get the troops under his command back to the North, however, they were captured at their post in by Van Dorn due to delays by other officers and the Confederates seizing schooners hired by Whipple to take the troops back North.

Whipple would escape captivity and make his was to New Orleans. He traveled under an assumed identity with a Confederate regiment, who he gleaned information from, until reaching Richmond after which he went to Washington, D.C., and turned himself over to the quartermaster-general. After returning Whipple served on the staff of Colonel David Hunter during the First Battle of Bull Run. During the battle, Whipple's horse was shot out from under him.

The next assignment Whipple received was to organize the staffs of Major General John A. Dix in Baltimore and General John Wool in Ft. Monroe. Whipple served as an Adjutant General throughout 1862 before his promotion to brigadier general of volunteers on July 17, 1863. The appointment would expire due to lack of confirmation, but he would prevent a draft riot in Philadelphia while commanding the Lehigh District of Pennsylvania. He would also quelled violence from a clandestine organization of coal miners called the Molly Maguires through his vigilance. Despite the promotion, in October 1863 there was a question of whether his health was adequate for him to be assigned to duty.

Whipple was then sent west to serve as assistant adjutant general for the Army of the Cumberland on November 12, 1863. He would then join Major General Thomas as his Chief of Staff from December 5, 1863, to June 27, 1865. During this period he would be reappointed and confirmed to the rank of Brigadier General in September 1864 and be present at the Battle of Missionary Ridge, the Nashville Campaign, the Chattanooga Campaign, and the Siege of Atlanta, among others.

Whipple would also serve as an aide-de-camp to General Sherman for five years, Chief of Staff for the Military Division of Tennessee, and was brevetted to major general in the regular army in March 1865.

=== Post Civil War ===
Following the Civil War, Whipple continued to serve in the United States Army Adjutant General's Corps for a variety of divisions and departments beginning in 1878, eventually receiving the rank of colonel in 1887, before retiring in August 1890.

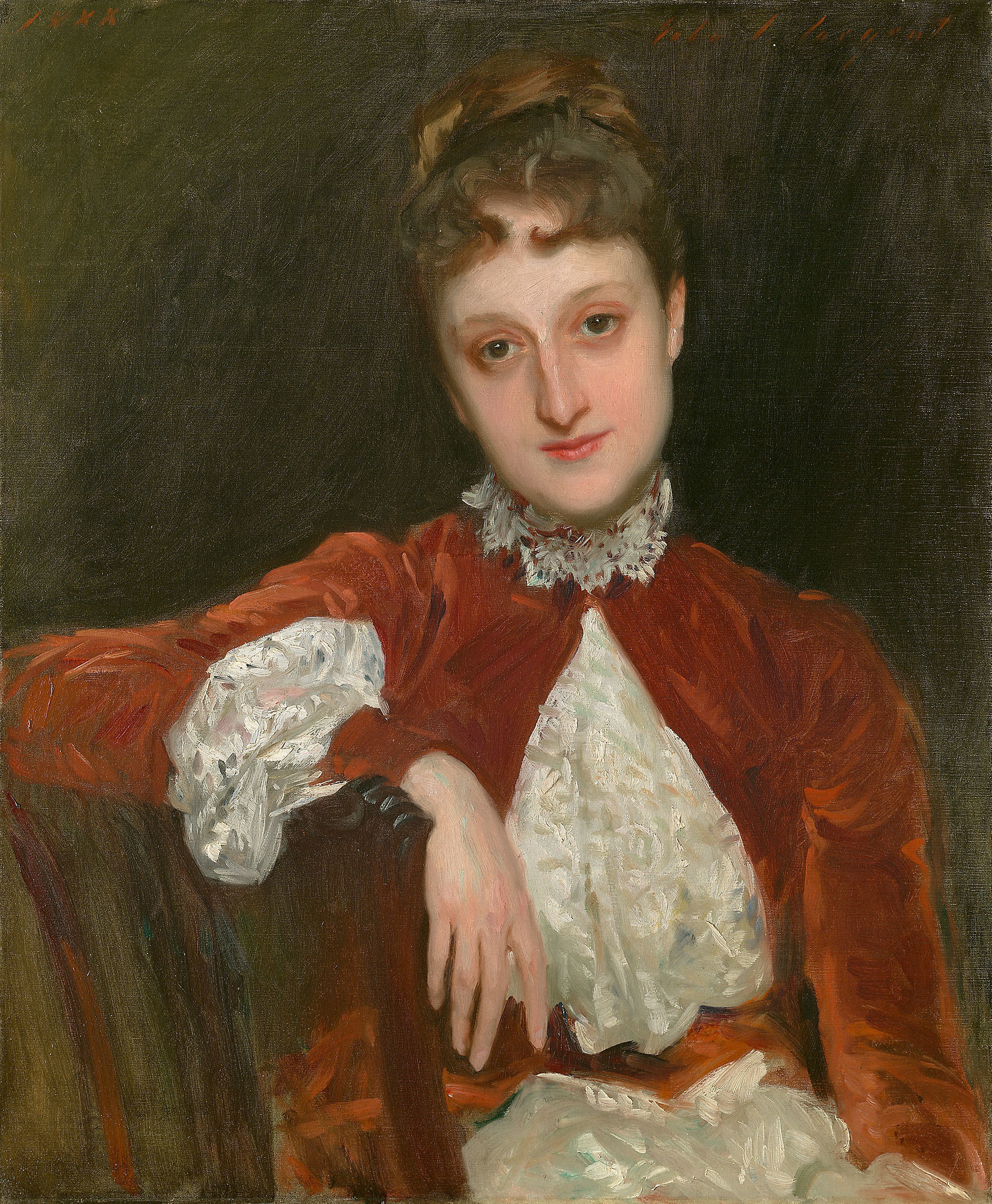
Portrait of Marion Whipple Deering painted by John Singer Sargent (ca. 1888)

Their daughter Marion would marry Charles Deering in 1883. Walter became a medical student in Manhattan, but died of a self-inflicted gunshot wound shortly before his brother Herbert graduated from the U.S. Military Academy in June 1885.

Whipple would contract a case of pneumonia which he, after several days, would die of on April 1, 1902, at the New York Hospital in New York City, where he had settled down. He was later buried in Arlington National Cemetery.

== Family ==
Only two of Whipple's children survived him. Herbert would become a captain in the 3rd U.S. Cavalry, retiring because of disability in September 1905. He returned to duty as a recruiting officer, served as a major in the Quartermaster Corps during World War I and died in June 1923 while serving as a professor of military science and tactics at the College of the City of New York.
