= Artamonov (crater) =

Crater on the Moon

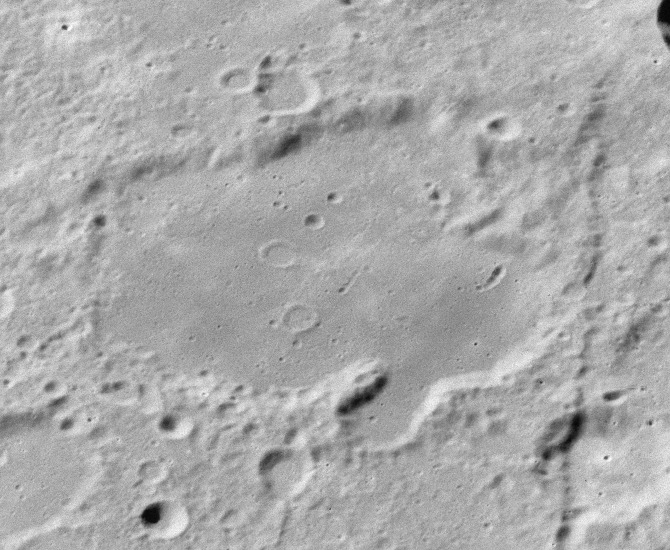
- Oblique Apollo 16 mapping camera image (facing northwest)
- Coordinates: 25.5°N 103.5°E
- Diameter: 62.45 km (38.80 mi)
- Depth: Unknown
- Colongitude: 257° at sunrise
- Formation: Early Imbrian
- Eponym: Nikolaj N. Artamonov

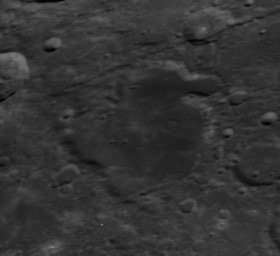
Oblique Apollo 14 Hasselblad camera image (facing east)

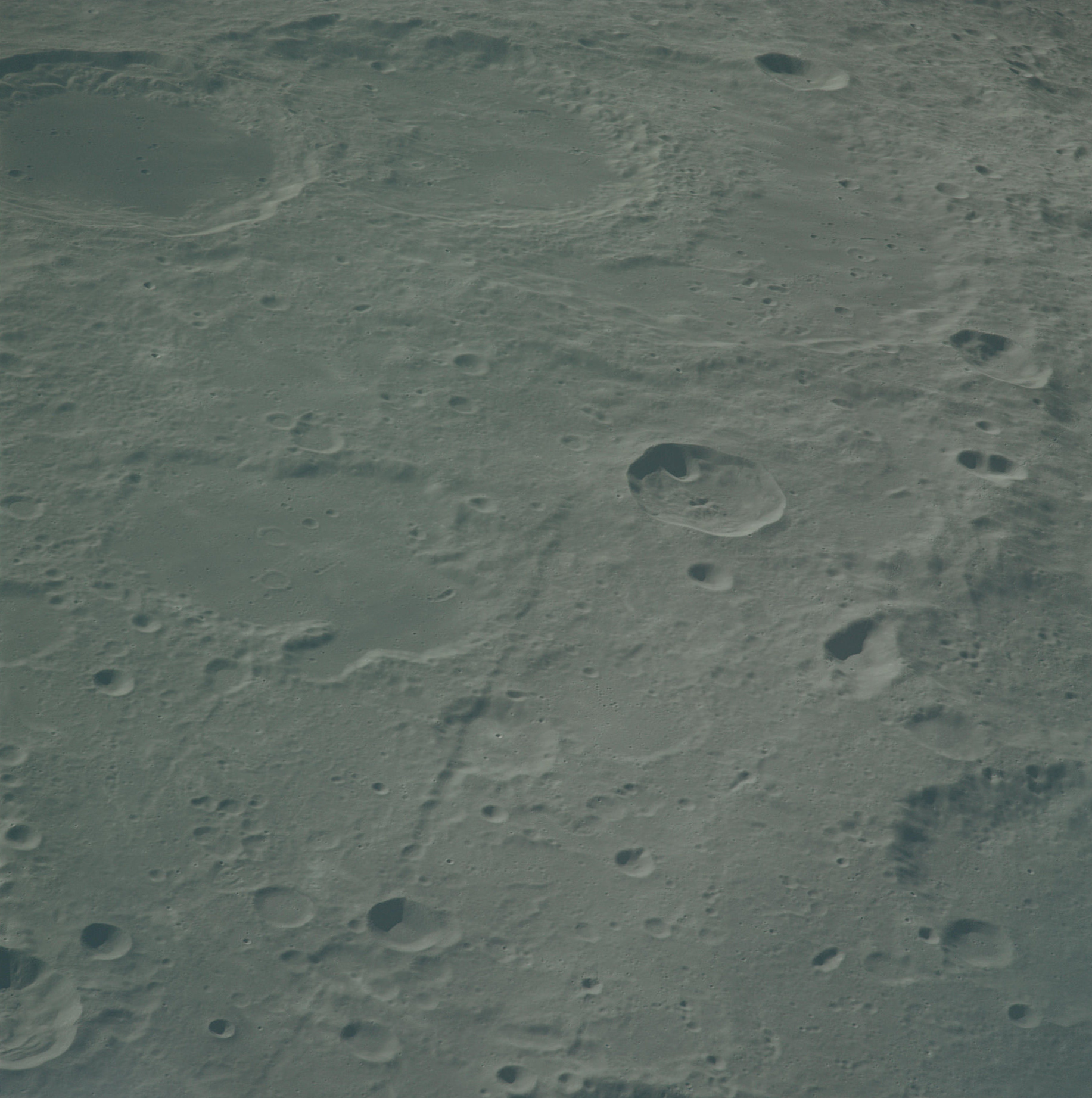
Oblique regional view from Apollo 16, showing Artamonov with Lomonosov, Maxwell, and Richardson at top

Artamonov is a lunar impact crater on the far side of the Moon. It is located within the 620-km diameter Lomonosov-Fleming basin, inside the northern rim. The eroded outer rim of this formation does not have the circular shape of most lunar craters, but the overall shape of three or four merged craters. The largest is in the south, with smaller circular bulges to the north and east.

On the lunar geologic timescale, this crater dates to the early Imbrian period. The crater's interior floor appears to have been resurfaced, presumably by subsequent flows of basaltic lava, leaving a relatively flat, featureless floor that appears darker due to lower albedo. It is faintly marked by lighter-hued ejecta from the crater Giordano Bruno to the north.

A linear formation of craters designated Catena Artamonov is alongside its northeast rim, following a course to the southeast. This feature is radial to the center of the Mare Orientale impact basin, although 3,000 km distant. Nearby craters of note include Maxwell and Lomonosov to the northwest, and Edison to the west. To the east-northeast is the smaller crater Espin, while the small Malyy formation is to the south-southeast.

This crater is named after Soviet rocket engineer Nikolaj N. Artamonov (1906–1965). Its designation was formally adopted by the IAU in 1970.
