= Catena Artamonov =

Impact craters on the Moon

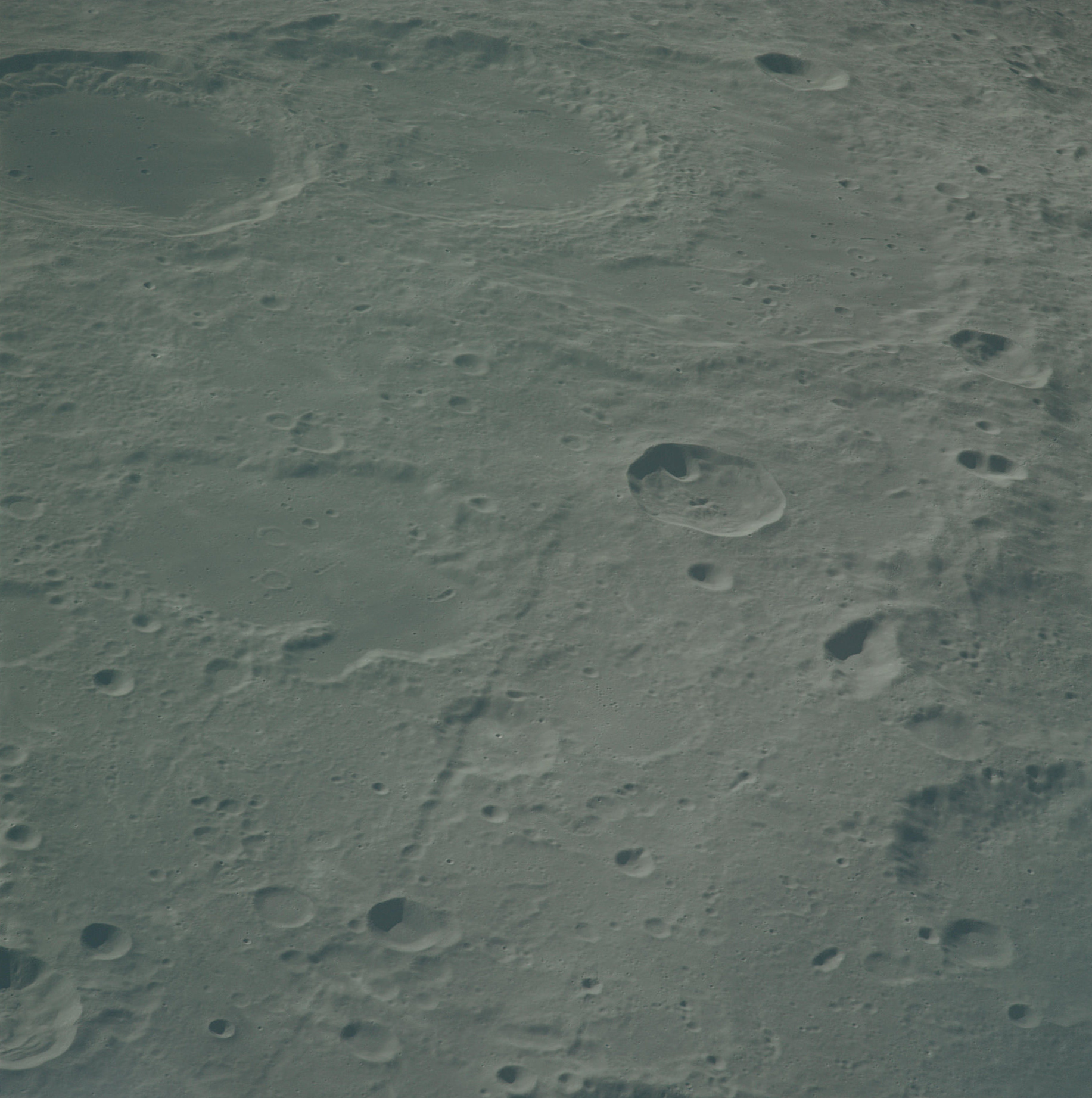
Oblique regional view from Apollo 16, with Catena Artamonov near center, Artamonov at left, and Lomonosov, Maxwell, and Richardson at top

Catena Artamonov is a 134 km (83 mi) long chain of craters on the Moon. It is named after the nearby crater Artamonov and is located at 26.0°N 105.9°E. The name of the feature was approved by the IAU in 1976.
