= Sumner (crater) =

Crater on the Moon

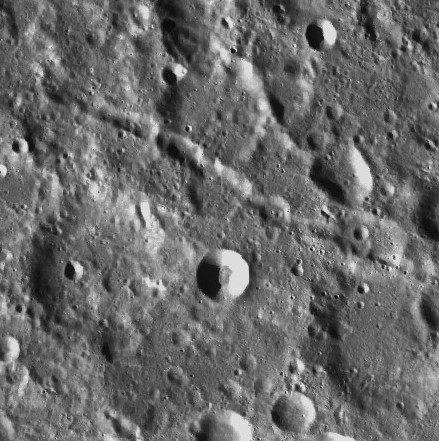
- Sumner crater (eroded, left of center) in LRO image
- Coordinates: 37.62°N 108.76°E
- Diameter: 52.87 km (32.85 mi)
- Depth: Unknown
- Colongitude: 252° at sunrise
- Eponym: Thomas H. Sumner

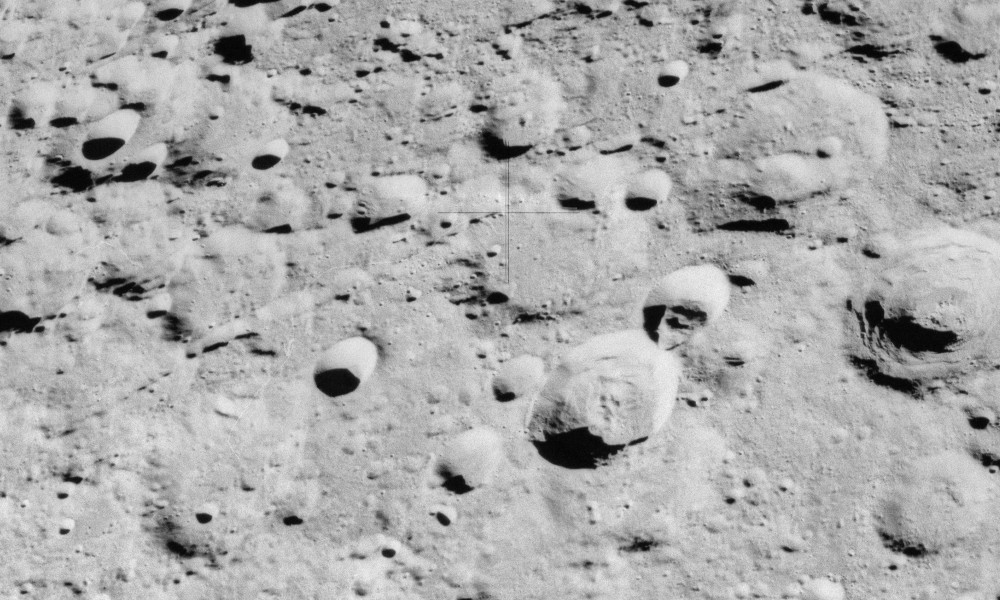
Oblique Apollo 16 image of Sumner and Catena Sumner

Sumner is a lunar impact crater on the far side of the Moon, beyond the northeastern limb. It is southwest of the larger crater Szilard, and southeast of the twin walled plains called Fabry and Harkhebi.

This crater formation has been heavily damaged by a history of impacts, leaving an irregular, battered outer rim. A smaller impact crater has merged into the southern rim; the northern rim is little more than an irregular, arcing range of ridges. The interior is nearly as irregular, and the entire formation is little more than a rugged depression in the surface.

The crater is named after American geographer and navigator Thomas Hubbard Sumner. The name was approved by the IAU in 1970.

Starting about 30 kilometers to the north of Sumner and progressing to the east-southeast is a long, linear chain of craters that forms an irregular cleft in the surface. This formation is named Catena Sumner. It progresses to the northeast rim of Harriot A, a satellite crater of Harriot.

== Satellite craters ==
By convention, these features are identified on lunar maps by placing the letter on the side of the crater midpoint that is closest to Sumner.

Sumner	Latitude	Longitude	Diameter
G	37.2° N	110.2° E	18 km
