= Giordano =

Giordano may refer to:

== People ==
- Giordano (name)
- Giordano (footballer) (born 1993), Brazilian footballer
- Umberto Giordano, or simply Giordano, Italian composer

== Businesses ==
- Giordano International, a Hong Kong–based, global clothing retailer
- Giordano's, a retailer and innovator of Chicago-style pizza

== See also ==
- Giordano Bruno (disambiguation)
- Jordan (disambiguation)
- Jordanus (disambiguation)
