= Vestine =

Vestine may refer to:

== People ==
- Ernest Harry Vestine (1906–1968), American geophysicist
- Henry Vestine (1944–1997), American guitar player

== Other uses ==
- Vestine (crater), crater on the Moon
