= Edison (crater) =

Crater on the Moon

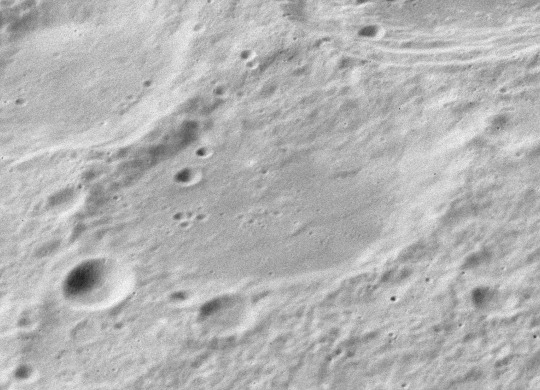
- Oblique Apollo 16 mapping camera image
- Coordinates: 25.0°N 99.1°E
- Diameter: 62.72 km (38.97 mi)
- Depth: Unknown
- Colongitude: 261° at sunrise
- Formation: Pre-Nectarian
- Eponym: Thomas A. Edison

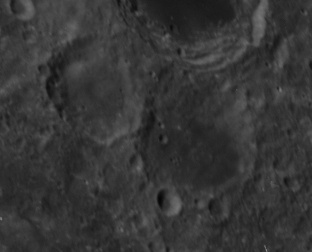
Oblique Apollo 14 Hasselblad camera image; Edison is right of center, Edison T is left of center

Edison is a lunar impact crater on the far side of the Moon, located just behind the north-northeastern limb. The formation is attached to the southeastern outer rim of the crater Lomonosov, to the east of the walled plain named Joliot. The satellite crater Edison T is attached to the western rim of Edison and the eastern rim of Joliot. To the south of Edison is the crater Dziewulski, and due east is Artamonov.

This formation dates to the Pre-Nectarian period of the lunar geologic timescale, and it is superimposed over a gravity anomaly. The outer rim of this crater is somewhat eroded, with two small craters along the southern edge, and the outer rampart of Lomonosov intruding slightly into the interior floor. The most intact section of rim is along the eastern side. The interior floor is relatively level, particularly in the southern half, and there is a small craterlet near the western inner wall. The floor displays dark patches and streaks of higher albedo surface where the ray system from Giordano Bruno to the north-northwest. However it is not as dark in hue as the floor of Lomonosov.

This formation is named after American inventor Thomas Alva Edison (1847-1931). His name was proposed in the Soviet Atlas of the Far Side of the Moon in 1960, and was officially adopted by the International Astronomical Union in 1961.

== Satellite craters ==
By convention these features are identified on lunar maps by placing the letter on the side of the crater midpoint that is closest to Edison.

Edison	Latitude	Longitude	Diameter
T	24.7° N	97.1° E	48 km
