= Vestine (crater) =

Crater on the Moon

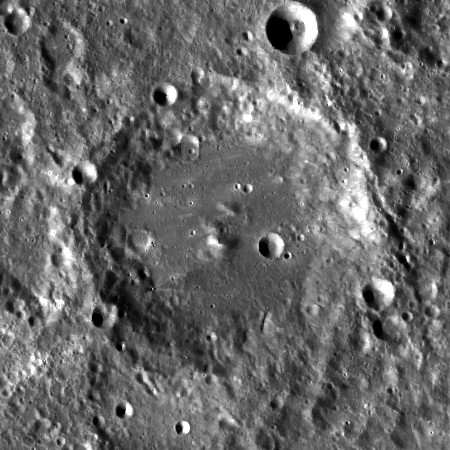
- LRO image
- Coordinates: 33.9°N 93.9°E
- Diameter: 96 km
- Depth: Unknown
- Colongitude: 268° at sunrise
- Formation: Imbrian
- Eponym: Ernest H. Vestine

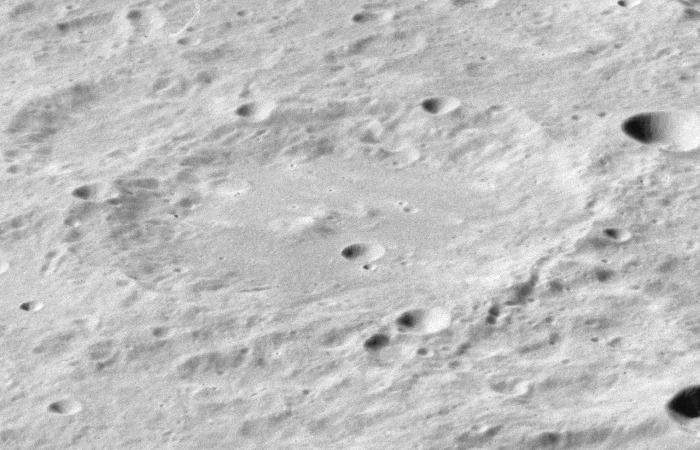
Oblique Apollo 16 mapping camera image

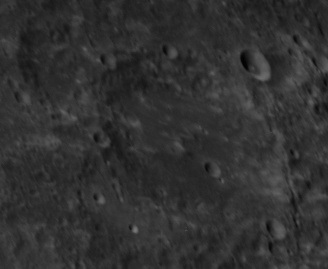
Oblique Apollo 14 Hasselblad camera image

Vestine is a heavily eroded impact crater on the Moon's far side, just beyond the northeastern limb. It lies to the southwest of the large walled plain called Harkhebi, and to the northwest of the Maxwell–Richardson crater pair.

This formation dates to the Imbrian period on the lunar geologic timescale. The outer rim is an irregular ridge about the interior floor. The small satellite crater Vestine A lies across the northern rim. The crater Vestine covers the eastern half of the crater Vestine T, an older and somewhat smaller formation. The interior floor has a rounded central ridge with a small craterlet located just to the east.

Prior to formal naming in 1970 by the IAU, this crater was known as Crater 111.

The crater is named after American geophysicist and meteorologist Ernest Harry Vestine. Vestine's son, Henry, was a guitarist for the American blues rock band Canned Heat. Following Henry Vestine's death, a memorial fund was set up in his name, with one of its goals being to convey some of Henry's ashes to the Vestine crater.

== Satellite craters ==
By convention these features are identified on lunar maps by placing the letter on the side of the crater midpoint that is closest to Vestine.

Vestine	Latitude	Longitude	Diameter
A	36.2° N	94.8° E	17 km
T	33.9° N	91.1° E	49 km
