= Giordano Bruno (disambiguation) =

Giordano Bruno (1548–1600) was an Italian philosopher and mystic.

Giordano Bruno may also refer to:

- Giordano Bruno (crater), a crater on the Moon
- Giordano Bruno (film), a 1973 film by Giuliano Montaldo

== See also ==
- 5148 Giordano, asteroid
- Bruno Giordano (born 1956), Italian soccer player
- Bruno Giordano (politician) (born 1954), Italian politician
- Giordano Bruno and the Hermetic Tradition, the 1964 non-fiction book by Frances A. Yates
- Giordano Bruno Foundation, a non-profit foundation based in Germany
- Statue of Giordano Bruno, a statue in the Campo de' Fiori in Rome
