= Urey (crater) =

Crater on the Moon

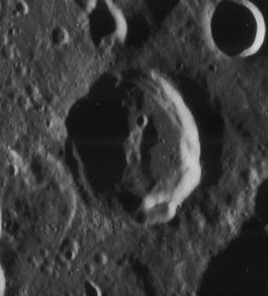
- Oblique Lunar Orbiter 4 image
- Coordinates: 27.9°N 87.4°E
- Diameter: 38 km
- Depth: Unknown
- Colongitude: 273° at sunrise
- Eponym: Harold C. Urey

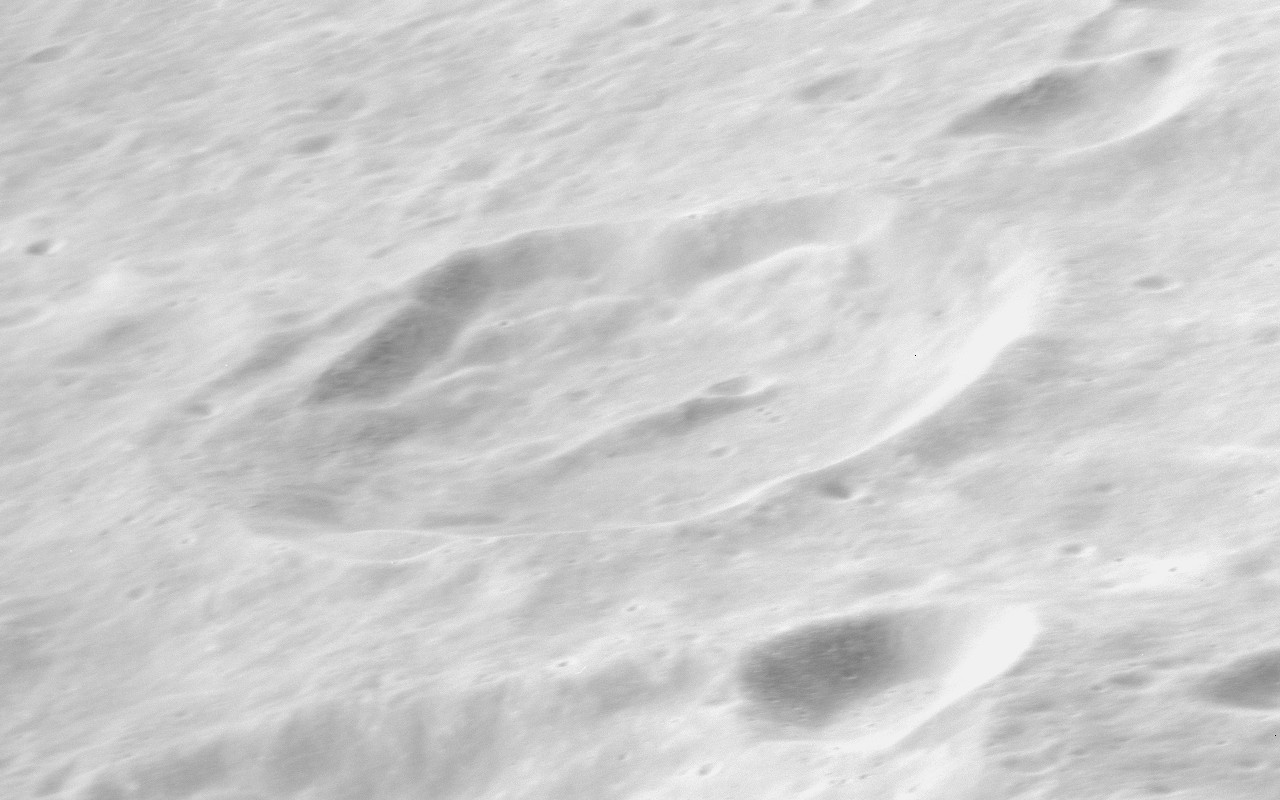
Oblique view from Apollo 16

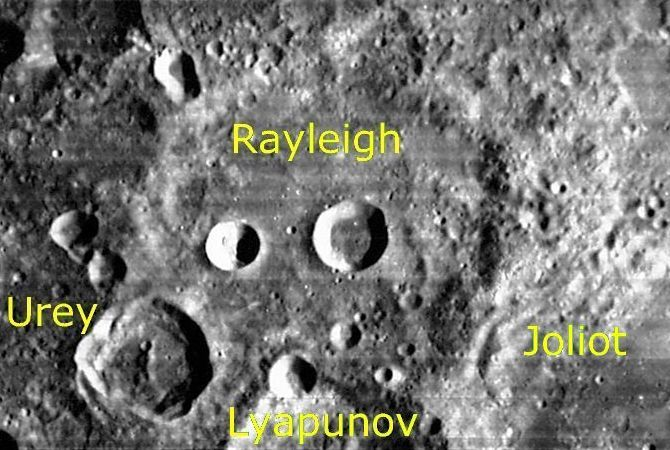
Urey, Rayleigh, and surroundings. NASA photo.

Urey is a lunar impact crater located in the narrow niche of terrain between the western halves of the craters Rayleigh and Lyapunov. It lies near the east-northeastern limb of the Moon, and thus appears very foreshortened when viewed from the Earth.

The rim of Urey has outward bulges along the western and southeastern sides. There are no notable craters along the rim or inner wall. However, there are a few small craterlets on the interior floor, including a crater at the northern end of the central ridge. This range of low hills divides the floor in half, running north–south for a distance of about one third the crater diameter.

This crater was previously designated Rayleigh A, a satellite of Rayleigh, before being given its current name by the IAU.
