= Fabry (crater) =

Impact crater

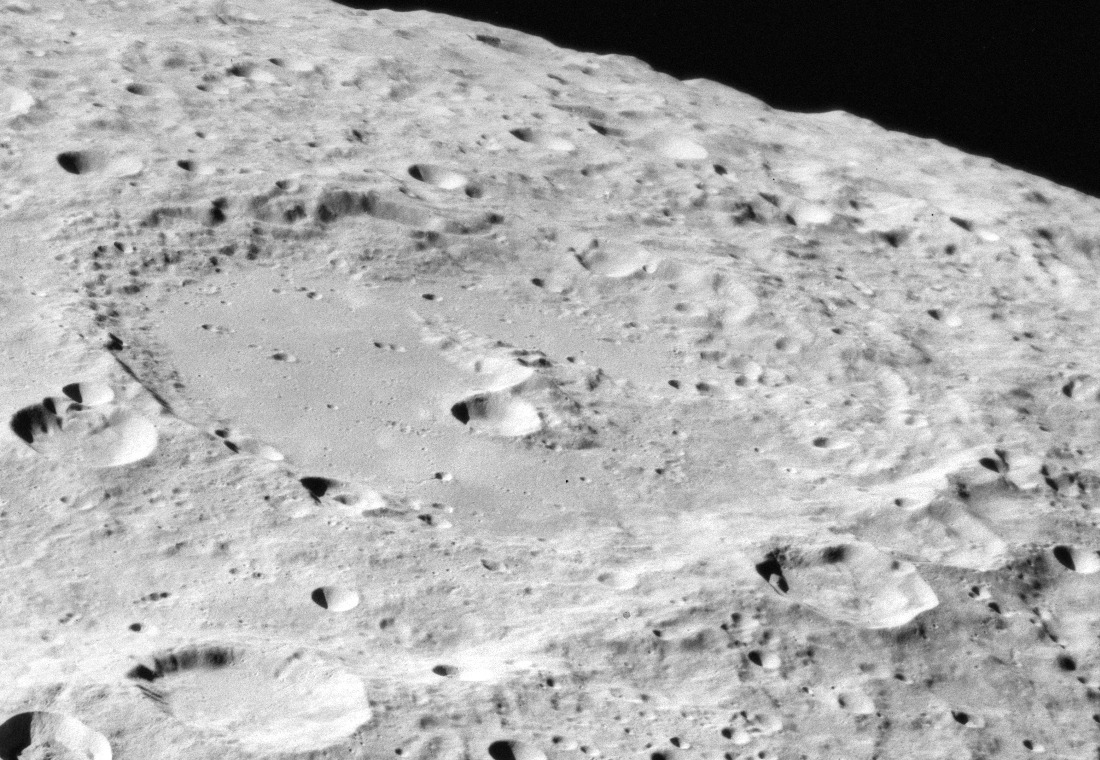
- Oblique Apollo 16 mapping camera image
- Coordinates: 43.07°N 100.68°E
- Diameter: 179.44 km (111.50 mi)
- Depth: Unknown
- Colongitude: 260° at sunrise
- Formation: Pre-Nectarian
- Eponym: Charles Fabry

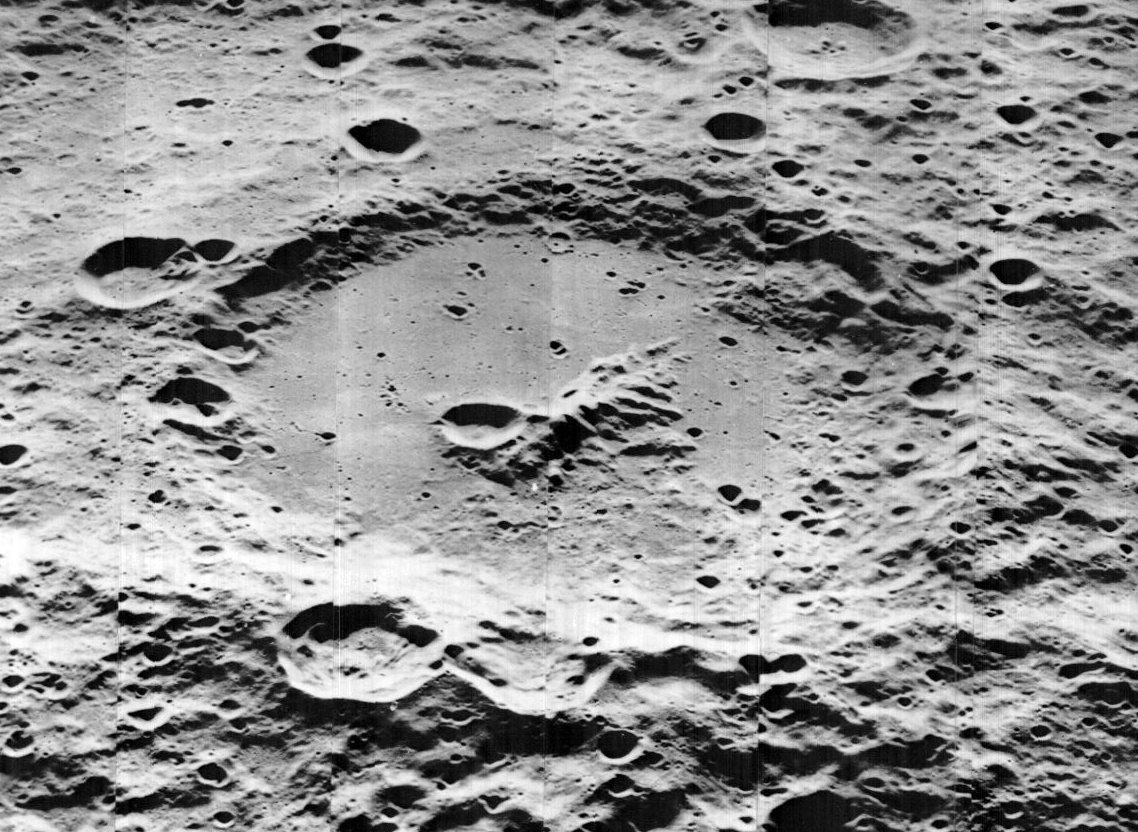
Oblique Lunar Orbiter 5 image, facing west

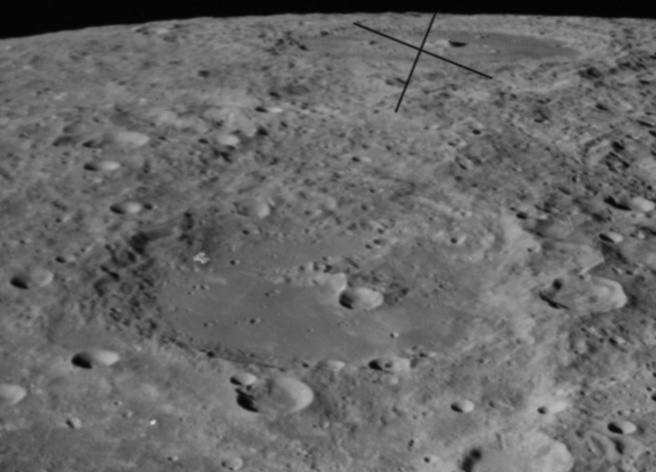
Oblique Apollo 14 Hasselblad camera image, with the large crater Compton in the background

Fabry is a large lunar impact crater of the form termed a walled plain. It is located on the far side of the Moon, just beyond the northeastern limb. This formation is of significant dimensions in its own right, but it overlies the northeast rim of an even larger basin named Harkhebi. To the west is the crater Vashakidze, and east of Fabry is the small Petrie. Northwards lies Swann.

This formation dates to the Pre-Nectarian period of the lunar geologic timescale. The outer rim of Fabry is heavily worn and eroded, with notches from subsequent impacts. A pair of small craters, including Fabry H, lies along the eastern rim. Smaller craters lie along many parts of this remaining rim, most notably a small crater across the southern rim, and a short, hook-shaped valley cutting across the northwest rim. Only a few sections of the rim remain relatively intact, while the remainder is merely a ring of mountainous terrain.

Sections of the interior floor are relatively smooth and level, but the surface is rough and irregular in the northeast quadrant. There is a central peak formed from a long massif that covers nearly a quarter of the crater diameter from west to east. The infrared spectrum of pure crystalline plagioclase has been identified on this peak and the northern floor. At the southeast end of this peak formation is a small crater, located just to the southeast of the midpoint. The remainder of the floor has been resurfaced, and now is marked only by tiny craterlets and the rough ground along the edge of the rim.

Ray material from the young crater Giordano Bruno to the south carries across the floor of Harkhebi, and lies in a few faint patches on the floor of Fabry. This is most notable in the southern part of the crater to the south of the small crater near the midpoint.

This formation is named after French physicist Charles Fabry (1867-1945). Prior to formal naming in 1970 by the IAU, this crater was known as Crater 45.

== Satellite craters ==
By convention these features are identified on lunar maps by placing the letter on the side of the crater midpoint that is closest to Fabry.

Fabry	Latitude	Longitude	Diameter
H	41.9° N	105.2° E	37 km
X	49.0° N	96.7° E	28 km
