= 22740 Rayleigh =

Outer main-belt asteroid

Discovery
- Discovered by: E. W. Elst
- Discovery site: La Silla Obs.
- Discovery date: 20 September 1998

Designations
- Named after: Lord Rayleigh (English physicist)
- Alternative designations: 1998 SX_{146} · 1986 SN
- Minor planet category: main-belt · (outer) background · Zhongguo

Orbital characteristics
- Epoch 23 March 2018 (JD 2458200.5)
- Uncertainty parameter 0
- Observation arc: 31.32 yr (11,438 d)
- Aphelion: 3.9380 AU
- Perihelion: 2.5473 AU
- Semi-major axis: 3.2426 AU
- Eccentricity: 0.2144
- Orbital period (sidereal): 5.84 yr (2,133 d)
- Mean anomaly: 200.81°
- Mean motion: 0° 10^{m} 7.68^{s} / day
- Inclination: 3.1157°
- Longitude of ascending node: 169.06°
- Argument of perihelion: 112.43°

Physical characteristics
- Mean diameter: 9.819±2.434 km
- Geometric albedo: 0.088±0.081
- Absolute magnitude (H): 13.4

22740 Rayleigh (provisional designation 1998 SX_{146}) is a Zhongguo asteroid from the outermost region of the asteroid belt, approximately 10 kilometers (6 miles) in diameter. It was discovered on 20 September 1998, by Belgian astronomer Eric Elst at the La Silla Observatory in Chile. It is one of few asteroids located in the 2:1 resonance with Jupiter. The asteroid was named for English physicist and Nobel laureate Lord Rayleigh.

== Orbit and classification ==
Rayleigh is a non-family asteroid from the main belt's background population. It is a member of the small group of Zhongguo asteroids, located in the Hecuba gap (2:1 mean motion resonance with Jupiter) near 3.27 AU. Contrary to the nearby unstable Griqua group, the orbits of the Zhongguos are stable over half a billion years.

It orbits the Sun in the outer asteroid belt at a distance of 2.5–3.9 AU once every 5 years and 10 months (2,133 days; semi-major axis of 3.24 AU). Its orbit has an eccentricity of 0.21 and an inclination of 3° with respect to the ecliptic. The body's observation arc begins with its observations as 1986 SN at Klet Observatory in September 1986, or 13 years prior to its official discovery observation at La Silla.

== Physical characteristics ==
=== Diameter and albedo ===
According to the survey carried out by the NEOWISE mission of NASA's Wide-field Infrared Survey Explorer, Rayleigh measures 9.819 kilometers in diameter and its surface has an albedo of 0.088.

=== Rotation period ===
As of 2018, no rotational lightcurve of Rayleigh has been obtained from photometric observations. The body's rotation period, pole and shape remain unknown.

== Naming ==
This minor planet was named after English physicist John William Strutt, 3rd Baron Rayleigh (Lord Rayleigh; 1842–1919), who discovered the noble gas argon and was awarded the Nobel Prize in Physics in 1904 (also see list of laureates). The official naming citation was published by the Minor Planet Center on 1 June 2007 (M.P.C. 59923). The lunar crater Rayleigh as well as the crater Rayleigh on Mars are also named in his honor.
