= Harriot (crater) =

Lunar impact crater

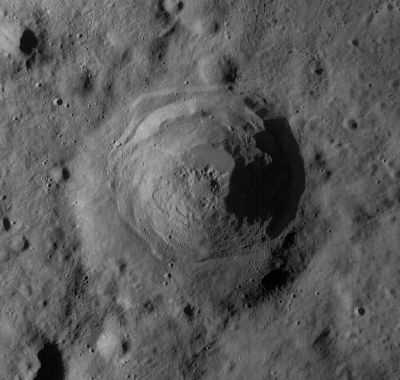
- LRO image
- Coordinates: 33.20°N 114.40°E
- Diameter: 52.77 km (32.79 mi)
- Depth: Unknown
- Colongitude: 246° at sunrise
- Eponym: Thomas Harriot

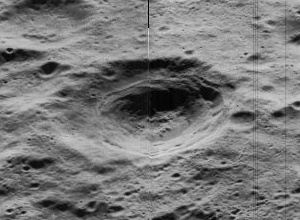
Oblique Lunar Orbiter 5 image, facing west

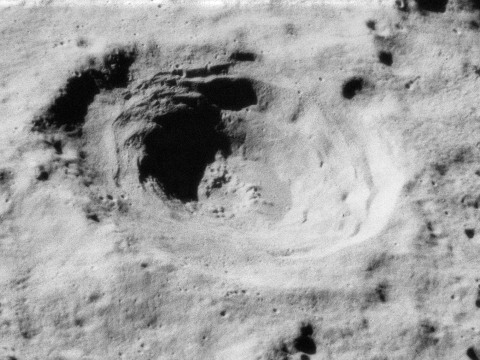
Oblique Apollo 16 image

Harriot is a lunar impact crater that is located on the far side of the Moon from the Earth. It lies just to the north of the much larger crater Seyfert. To the northeast of Harriot is the crater Cantor. About one and a half crater diameters to the north of Harriot is the eastern end of a crater chain named Catena Sumner. This feature continues to the west-northwest for a distance of 247 km, passing to the north of the crater Sumner.

This is a double-crater formation, with a younger, smaller impact crater, Harriot B, lying along the northeastern inner edge of an older and more eroded outer rim. The inner crater occupies nearly three quarters of the crater diameter. This interior feature has a well-defined rim edge, somewhat slumping inner walls, and a small central peak. The outer rim of Harriot is worn and eroded with edges that have become softened and rounded after a history of impacts nearby.

The crater is named after British mathematician and astronomer Thomas Harriot. The name was approved by the IAU in 1970.

== Satellite craters ==
By convention these features are identified on lunar maps by placing the letter on the side of the crater midpoint that is closest to Harriot. Harriot B lies within Harriot itself. Harriot W and X lie to the northwest of Harriot, and Harriot A, a highly eroded crater adjacent to Catena Sumner, lies to the north.

Harriot	Latitude	Longitude	Diameter
A	35.6° N	114.9° E	63 km
B	33.4° N	114.5° E	37 km
W	35.0° N	111.7° E	39 km
X	35.0° N	113.0° E	24 km
