= Rayleigh (lunar crater) =

Crater on the Moon

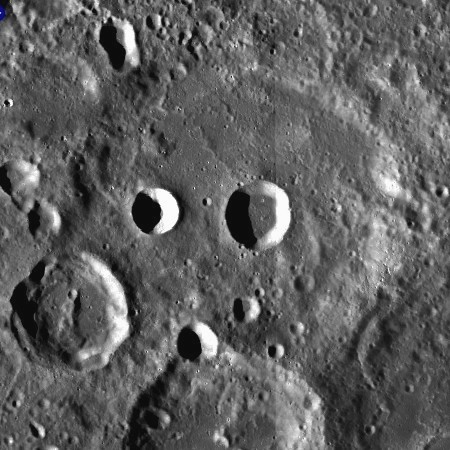
- LRO image
- Coordinates: 29.3°N 89.6°E
- Diameter: 113.77 km
- Colongitude: 273° at sunrise
- Eponym: Lord Rayleigh

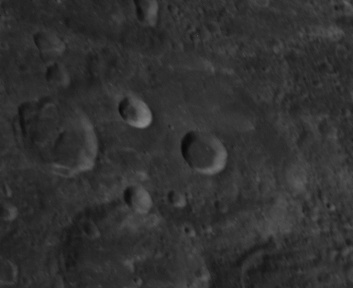
Oblique Apollo 14 Hasselblad camera image

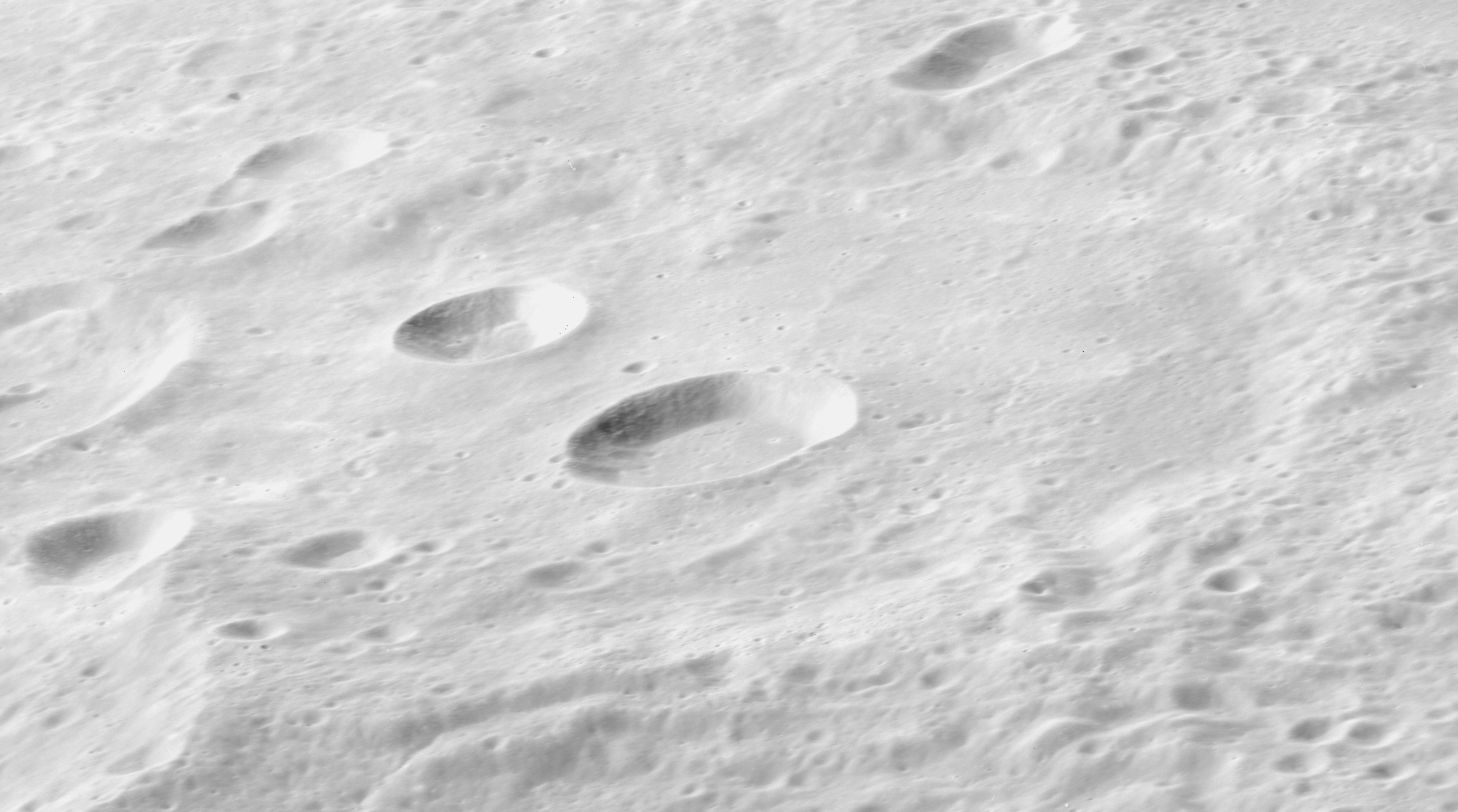
Oblique view from Apollo 16

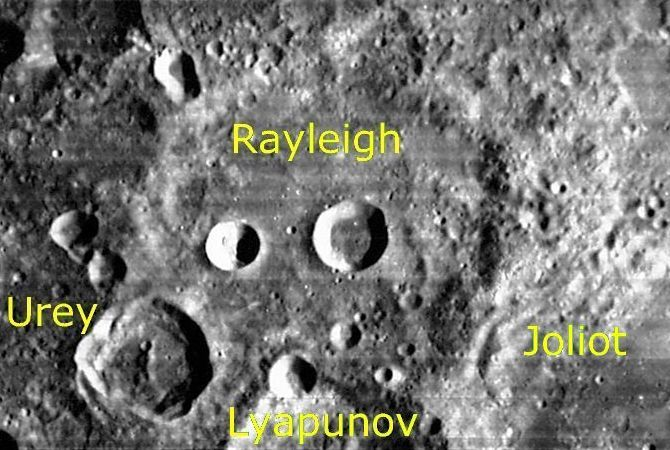
Rayleigh and surroundings. NASA photo.

Rayleigh is a lunar impact crater, approximately 114 kilometers in diameter, that lies along the northeast limb of the Moon. This feature is seen edge-on from Earth, making it difficult to see much detail. In addition, libration effects can completely hide this crater from view. It lies just to the north of Lyapunov, and to the northwest of the large Joliot. Attached to its southwest rim is the smaller Urey.

== Description ==
This is an eroded formation with a rim that has been worn and reshaped by impacts. This is particularly so in the south where the rim has been modified and supplemented by adjacent crater formations and several small craters that lie along the rim.

The interior floor is relatively level in places, but, partly due to overlapping ejecta, is somewhat rough and irregular in others, particularly in the southern half. A pair of small but prominent craters lies on the interior surface, with Rayleigh D just to the south of the crater midpoint and the smaller Rayleigh B situated in the western half.

Rayleigh was named for British physicist and 1904 Nobel laurette John William Strutt, 3rd Baron Rayleigh (1842–1919).

== Satellite craters ==
By convention these features are identified on lunar maps by placing the letter on the side of the crater midpoint that is closest to Rayleigh.

Rayleigh	Latitude	Longitude	Diameter	Refs
B	28.9° N	88.4° E	15.48 km	WGPSN
C	31.4° N	85.7° E	26.13 km	WGPSN
D	28.9° N	89.7° E	22.3 km	WGPSN

The following crater has been renamed by the IAU.

- Rayleigh A — see Urey (crater).

== See also ==
- 22740 Rayleigh, asteroid
