= Mikheil Vashakidze =

Soviet astronomer

Mikheil Alexandres dze Vashakidze (Georgian: მიხეილ ვაშაკიძე; August 15, 1909 – November 27, 1956) was a Soviet astronomer, who worked in the Abastumani astrophysical observatory (Georgia) from 1936 to 1956. He and Victor Alekseyevich Dombrovsky (Виктор Алексеевич Домбровский) (September 30, 1913 – February 1, 1972) both discovered independently the polarized nature of radiation from the Crab Nebula in 1952 and 1953, which was caused by synchrotron radiation.

Vashakidze also created a new method for learning the distribution of the stars in space, which is now known as the Vashakidze–Oort method. He was awarded the "Order of Honour".

The crater Vashakidze on the Moon is named after him.
