= Malyy (crater) =

Crater on the Moon

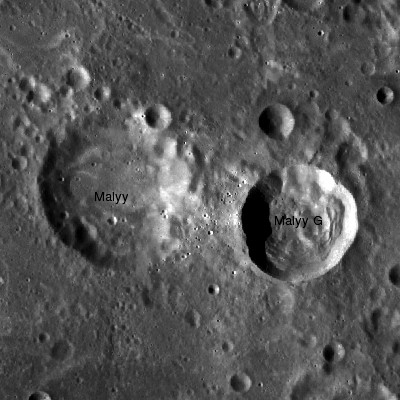
- LRO image of Malyy (left) and Malyy G
- Coordinates: 21.9°N 105.3°E
- Diameter: 41 km
- Depth: Unknown
- Colongitude: 253° at sunrise
- Eponym: Aleksandr L. Malyy

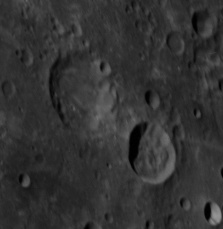
Oblique Apollo 14 Hasselblad camera image. Malyy is largest crater, above left of center, and Malyy G is below right of center

Malyy is a damaged lunar impact crater that lies on the far side of the Moon, behind the eastern limb as seen from the Earth. It is located to the south-southeast of the crater Artamonov. Slightly farther to the east-northeast lies Deutsch. The quadrant of terrain to the southwest of Malyy forms a nearly level plain marked by small craters and buried features.

Several small craterlets overlap parts of the rim of Malyy, and the edge is generally eroded and uneven. The satellite crater Malyy G just to the east is much better defined, with a crisp, sharp edge, and is most likely a younger crater.

The crater is named after Aleksandr L. Malyy (Maly), Soviet rocket scientist who was one of three lead engineers and project managers overlooking the launch of Yuri Gagarin into orbit around the Earth on 1961 April 12. Malyy, a physicist and mathematician, was responsible for supervising the development of the rocket engine. He was born March 7, 1907, and died August 11, 1962.

== Satellite craters ==
By convention these features are identified on lunar maps by placing the letter on the side of the crater midpoint that is closest to Malyy.

Malyy	Latitude	Longitude	Diameter
G	21.7° N	106.9° E	28 km
K	19.6° N	107.0° E	15 km
L	19.9° N	106.1° E	14 km
