= Harkhebi =

Ancient Egyptian astronomer

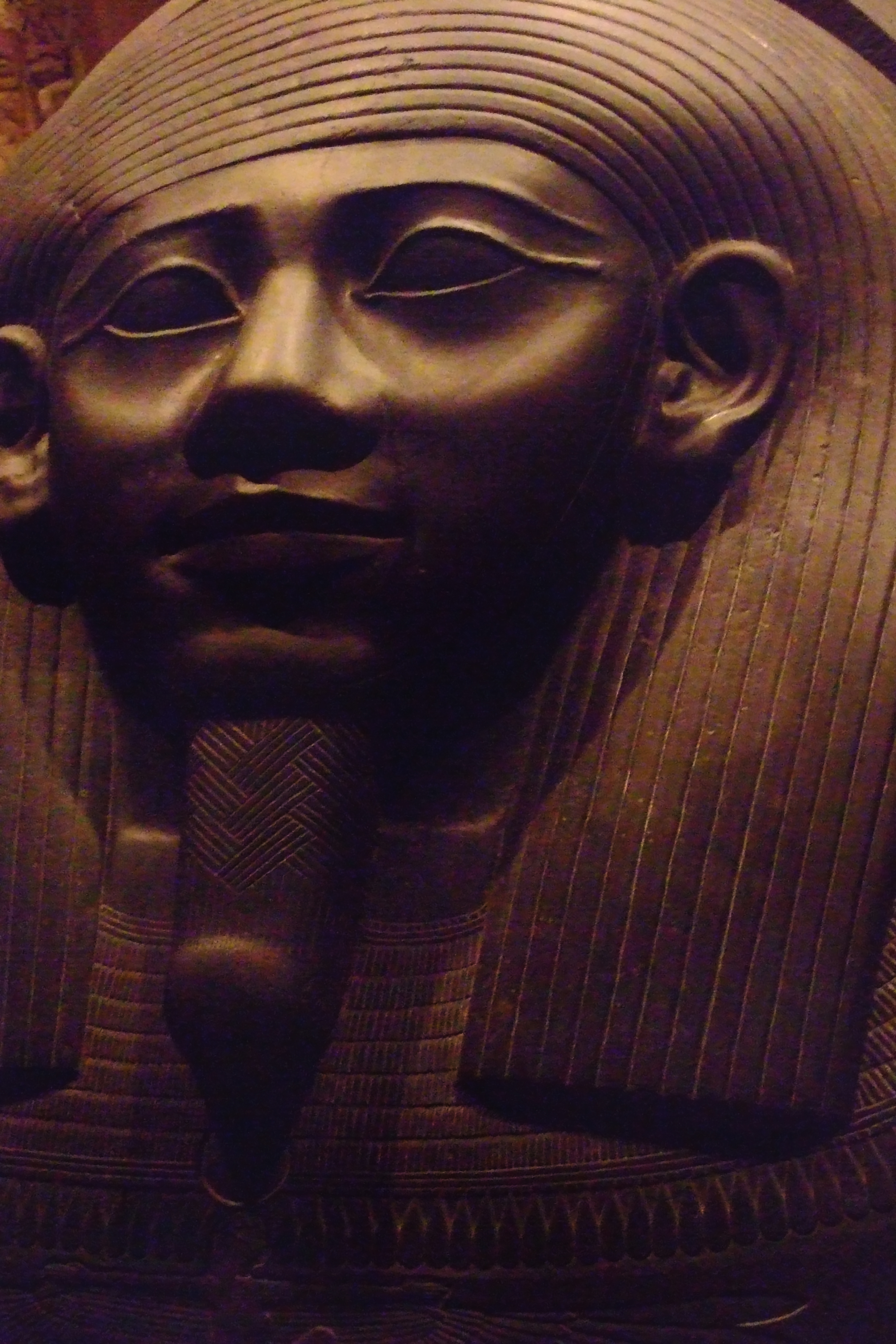
Sarcophagus of Harkhebi Dynasty (664-525 BCE)

Harkhebi (ca. 300 BC) was an ancient Egyptian astronomer who lived in Ptolemaic Egypt during the rule of the Ptolemaic dynasty. He was known as the priest of Selket (the stargazer). He specialized in the treatment of snake bites and scorpion stings. He also kept record of day and night, tracking the rising and setting of the sun. This is how it was deduced in 1872 that he was present in the temple of Illahun.

He may have based many of his observations on earlier Babylonian contributions to astronomy. A funereal statue associated with him is known with an inscription in which he describes himself as an expert on observing stars. He referred to the planets as "the gods who foretell the future" and claimed to know everything Sirius predicted, but apparently did not write personal horoscopes.

Harkhebi predicted the weather patterns of the heliacal risings of the fixed stars. He refers the winds and the omens to his prediction of meteorology. While Harkhebi was observing the north and south motions of the sun and Venus, he concluded that the Babylonians had some affiliation with the weather phenomena in Enuma Anu Enil.

== Named after Harkhebi ==
The lunar crater Harkhebi is named after him. Half of the crater is on top of the large walled plain Fabry. This is on the north-northeast side of Fabry. On the other half, the northwest half, lies Vashakidze, a smaller crater than Fabry. And on the southwest is Vestine, and Richardson on the south.
