= Nikolay Artamonov =

Soviet rocket engineer

Nikolay Nikolayevich Artamonov (Russian: Николай Николаевич Артамонов; December 6, 1906, Moscow – March 2, 1965) was a Soviet rocket engineer, a member of the Gas Dynamics Laboratory.

A Moon crater, Artamonov, is named after him.
