= Szilard (crater) =

Crater on the Moon

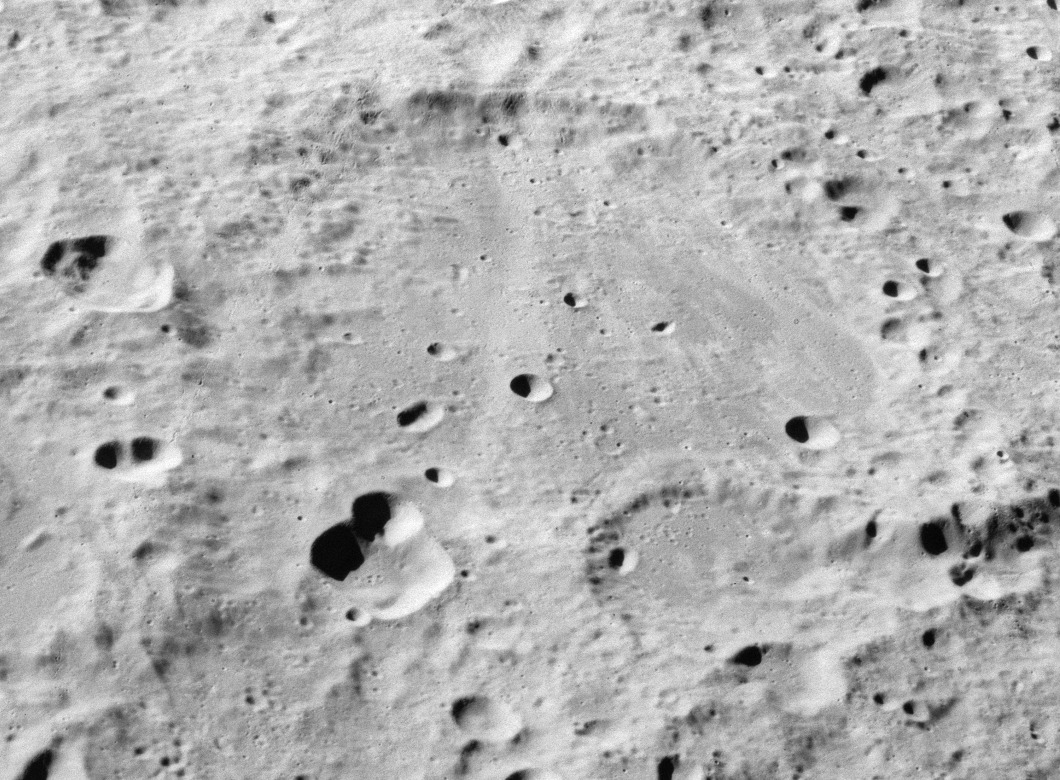
- Oblique Apollo 16 mapping camera image
- Coordinates: 34.0°N 105.7°E
- Diameter: 122 km
- Depth: Unknown
- Colongitude: 256° at sunrise
- Formation: Pre-Nectarian
- Eponym: Leó Szilárd

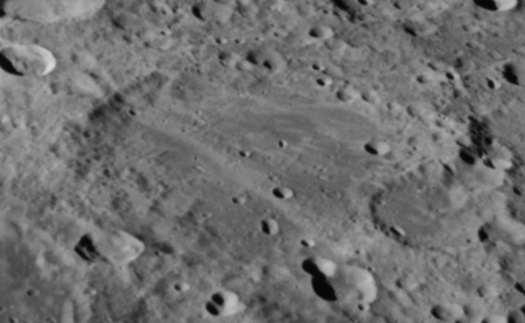
Oblique Apollo 14 Hasselblad camera image

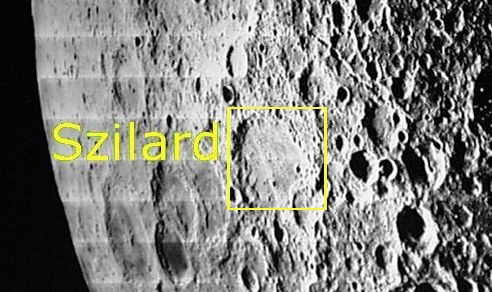
Szilard and surroundings. NASA photo.

Szilard is a damaged lunar impact crater that lies to the east-northeast of the crater Richardson. It lies on the far side of the Moon, and cannot be seen directly from the Earth. About a half-crater-diameter to the northwest of Szilard is the large walled plain named Harkhebi. Between Harkhebi and Szilard is the small Giordano Bruno. The ray system from this impact forms streaks across the rim and interior of Szilard.

The rim of Szilard is heavily eroded and has been reshaped by subsequent impacts. The worn satellite crater Szilard H lies across the southeast rim of Szilard. The interior floor of Szilard is somewhat uneven in the western half, while the eastern side is more level and featureless.

This formation is named after Leó Szilárd, the scientist who theorised nuclear chain reactions and famously worked on the atomic bomb during World War II. Prior to formal naming in 1970 by the IAU, this crater was known as Crater 116.

== Satellite craters ==
By convention these features are identified on lunar maps by placing the letter on the side of the crater midpoint that is closest to Szilard.

Szilard	Latitude	Longitude	Diameter
H	32.5° N	108.4° E	50 km
M	31.1° N	106.6° E	23 km
