= Petrie (crater) =

Crater on the Moon

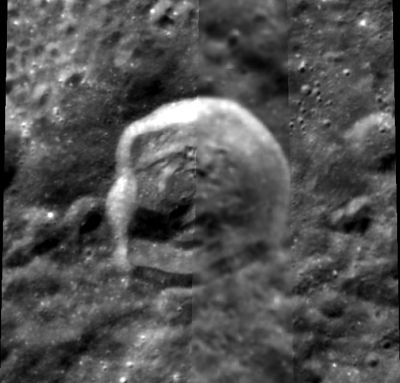
- Clementine mosaic
- Coordinates: 45.14°N 108.47°E
- Diameter: 32.86 km (20.42 mi)
- Depth: Unknown
- Colongitude: 252° at sunrise
- Eponym: Robert M. Petrie

Petrie is a relatively small lunar impact crater on the far side of the Moon. Petrie is located to the east of the much larger walled plain Fabry. To the east of Petrie is the comparably sized crater Rayet.

Most of the rim of Petrie is sharp-edged, with a deposit of scree along the base of the inner wall. There is an outward bulge to the rim along the southwest, where the surface has slumped into the interior.

This formation was named after Canadian astronomer Robert M. Petrie (1906–1966) by the IAU in 1970.

== Satellite craters ==
By convention these features are identified on lunar maps by placing the letter on the side of the crater midpoint that is closest to Petrie.

| Petrie | Latitude | Longitude | Diameter |
|---|---|---|---|
| U | 45.6° N | 106.3° E | 20 km |
