= Rayet (crater) =

Crater on the Moon

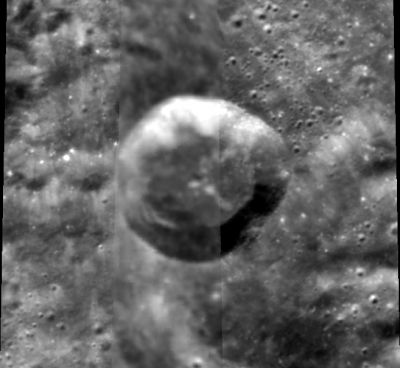
- Clementine mosaic
- Coordinates: 44.65°N 114.50°E
- Diameter: 27 km (17 mi)
- Depth: Unknown
- Colongitude: 246° at sunrise
- Eponym: Georges Rayet

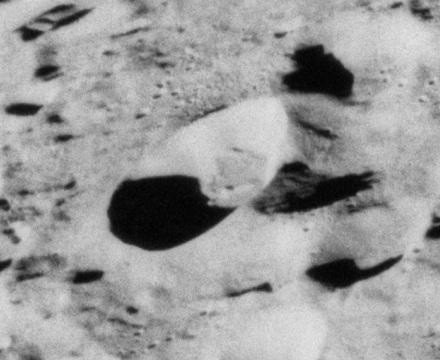
Oblique Apollo 16 image

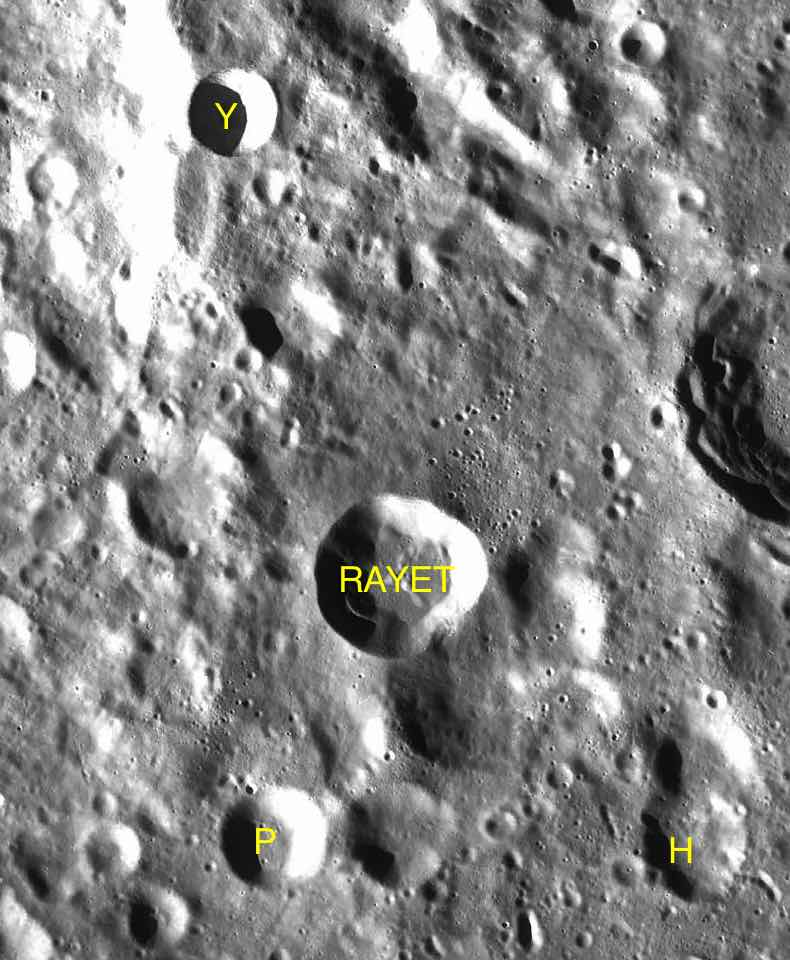
Rayet and satellite craters

Rayet is a small lunar impact crater that lies on the far side of the Moon, past the northeast limb. It lies to the southwest of the larger crater Millikan, and east of the comparably sized Petrie.

This crater is roughly circular in shape, with a sharp edge and relatively featureless inner walls that slope downward to the nearly level interior floor. The diameter of the floor is roughly two-thirds that of the crater. This formation has not been notably worn by impact erosion, and is otherwise undistinguished.

This feature was named after the French astronomer Georges Rayet (1839–1906) by the IAU in 1970.

== Satellite craters ==
By convention these features are identified on lunar maps by placing the letter on the side of the crater midpoint that is closest to Rayet.

Rayet	Latitude	Longitude	Diameter
H	43.4° N	116.7° E	16 km
P	43.3° N	114.0° E	17 km
Y	47.2° N	113.0° E	14 km

The fresh crater Rayet Y is less than 150 million years old and so dates to the Copernican period of the lunar geologic timescale.
