= Lomonosov (lunar crater) =

Crater on the Moon

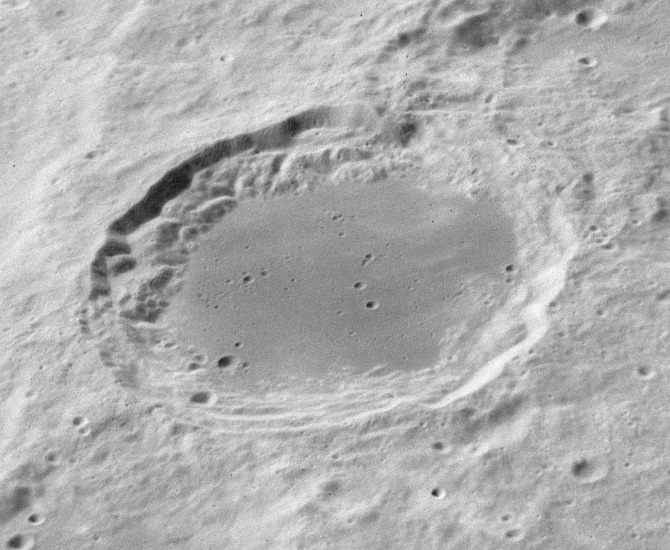
- Oblique Apollo 16 mapping camera image
- Coordinates: 27.3°N 98.0°E
- Diameter: 92 km
- Depth: Unknown
- Colongitude: 263° at sunrise
- Formation: Lower Imbrian
- Eponym: Mikhail V. Lomonosov

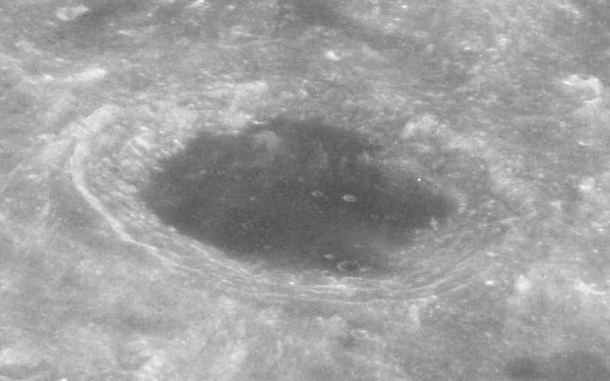
Oblique view from Apollo 8 at a high sun angle, demonstrating the crater's dark floor

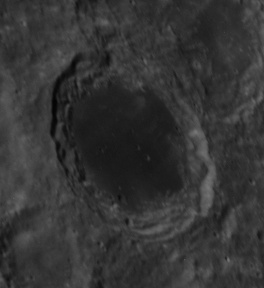
Oblique Apollo 14 Hasselblad camera image

Lomonosov is a lunar impact crater that is located just behind the western limb, on the far side of the Moon. It is almost attached to the east-northeastern outer rim of the larger crater Joliot, and overlies the southern rim of Maxwell. Attached to the southern rim of Lomonosov is the smaller Edison.

The interior floor of Lomonosov has been resurfaced with lava flows, leaving a dark, level surface marked only by a few tiny craterlets and some streaks of ray material from Giordano Bruno. Only the lowest portion of the interior is flooded, however, and much of the inner wall of the rim remains uncovered. The inner wall is narrower along the northern edge where the crater overlies Maxwell. There is also slumped material along the base of the inner wall.

This crater was formally named in 1961 by the IAU.

Lomonosov is a crater of Lower (Early) Imbrian age.

== See also ==
- 1379 Lomonosowa, asteroid
- Lomonosov (Martian crater)
