= Robert Methven Petrie =

Canadian astronomer

- Born: May 15, 1906; St Andrews, Scotland
- Died: April 8, 1966 (aged 59); Victoria, British Columbia
- Education: University of Michigan
- Awards: Henry Marshall Tory Medal (1961)
- Scientific career
- Fields: astronomy
- Workplaces: Dominion Astrophysical Observatory

Robert Methven Petrie (May 15, 1906 – April 8, 1966) was a Canadian astronomer.

He was born in Scotland but emigrated to Canada at the age of five. He grew up in Victoria, British Columbia and studied physics and mathematics at the University of British Columbia. He began working summer jobs at the Dominion Astrophysical Observatory and became fascinated with astronomy.

He obtained his PhD at the University of Michigan in 1932. He taught there until 1935, when he joined the staff of the Dominion Astrophysical Observatory. In 1951 he became its director.

He extensively studied spectroscopic binaries.

The crater Petrie on the Moon is named after him. The Canadian Astronomical Society established the R. M. Petrie Prize Lecture to honor his astrophysical research.
