= Richardson (lunar crater) =

Crater on the Moon

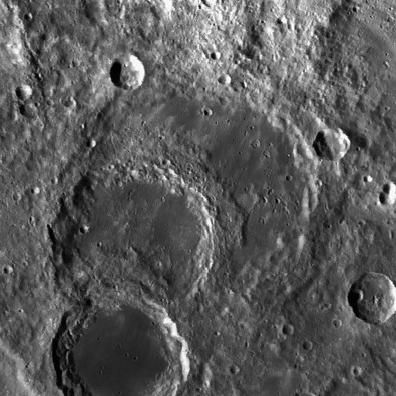
- LRO image
- Coordinates: 31.1°N 100.5°E
- Diameter: 141 km
- Depth: Unknown
- Colongitude: 262° at sunrise
- Formation: Pre-Nectarian
- Eponym: Owen W. Richardson

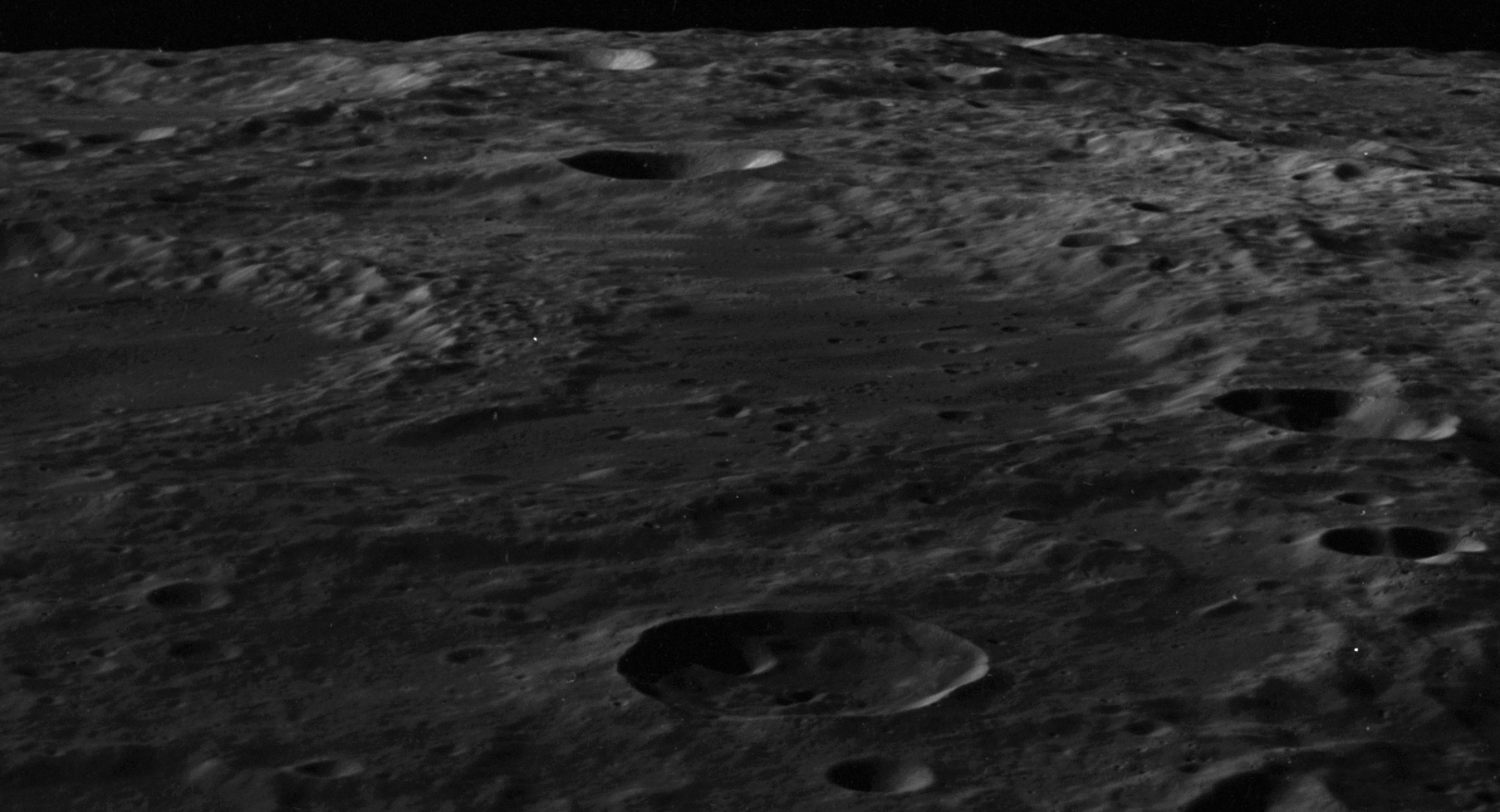
Oblique view from Apollo 14, facing northwest

Richardson is a large lunar impact crater located on the Moon's far side, just behind the eastern limb. It lies to the south of the huge walled plain Harkhebi, and to the east-southeast of the crater Vestine. Just to the northeast is Szilard, and to the southeast is Artamonov.

On the lunar geologic timescale, Richardson dates from the Pre-Nectarian period. A substantial portion of the crater is overlain by Maxwell, which lies across the rim to the southwest. The northeastern rim of Maxwell reaches the approximate midpoint of Richardson, and together with the outer rampart covers nearly half the interior floor. The remainder of the rim of Richardson is worn and eroded, with Richardson W intruding into the northwestern rim and Richardson E lying along the eastern side.

The surviving interior floor of Richardson is relatively level, but marked with a number of small craterlets. The rim and interior floor is covered by a number of wispy deposits from the Giordano Bruno impact, located just to the north-northeast.

== Naming ==
Prior to formal naming in 1979 by the International Astronomical Union (IAU), this crater was known as Crater 114. The crater is named after Owen Willans Richardson (1879–1959), a British physicist who was awarded the Nobel Prize in Physics in 1928 for his pioneering work on thermionic emission. The IAU officially adopted the name "Richardson" for this crater in 1979 in recognition of his contributions to science.

== Satellite craters ==
By convention these features are identified on lunar maps by placing the letter on the side of the crater midpoint that is closest to Richardson.

Richardson	Latitude	Longitude	Diameter
E	31.9° N	103.6° E	22 km
W	33.5° N	98.3° E	23 km
