= 1379 Lomonosowa =

Main-belt asteroid

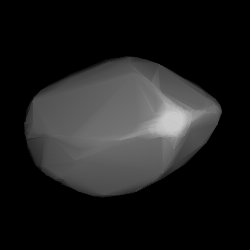
- Modelled shape of Lomonosowa

Discovery
- Discovered by: G. Neujmin
- Discovery site: Simeiz Obs.
- Discovery date: 19 March 1936

Designations
- Named after: Mikhail Lomonosov (18th century Russian polymath)
- Alternative designations: 1936 FC · 1933 SG_{1}
- Minor planet category: main-belt · (inner) background

Orbital characteristics
- Epoch 4 September 2017 (JD 2458000.5)
- Uncertainty parameter 0
- Observation arc: 111.93 yr (40,882 days)
- Aphelion: 2.7548 AU
- Perihelion: 2.2928 AU
- Semi-major axis: 2.5238 AU
- Eccentricity: 0.0915
- Orbital period (sidereal): 4.01 yr (1,464 days)
- Mean anomaly: 88.814°
- Mean motion: 0° 14^{m} 44.88^{s} / day
- Inclination: 15.607°
- Longitude of ascending node: 169.88°
- Argument of perihelion: 31.359°

Physical characteristics
- Dimensions: 17.82 km (derived); 18.690±0.177 km 19.71±0.80 km 20.135±0.160 km 20.45±0.56 km
- Synodic rotation period: 24.482±0.0272 h 24.4845±0.0005 h 24.4846±0.0001 h 24.488±0.001 h 24.71 h
- Geometric albedo: 0.1584±0.0343; 0.167±0.010; 0.182±0.018; 0.20 (assumed); 0.218±0.021
- Spectral type: S B–V = 0.830; U–B = 0.440
- Absolute magnitude (H): 10.626±0.005 (R) · 10.80 · 10.9 · 11.05 · 11.11 · 11.45±0.27

1379 Lomonosowa (prov. designation: 1936 FC) is a stony background asteroid from the central regions of the asteroid belt, approximately 19 kilometers (12 miles) in diameter. Discovered by Grigory Neujmin at the Simeiz Observatory in 1936, the asteroid was later named after Russian physicist and astronomer Mikhail Lomonosov.

== Discovery ==
Lomonosowa was discovered on 19 March 1936, by Soviet astronomer Grigory Neujmin at the Simeiz Observatory on the Crimean peninsula. On the same night, it was independently discovered by Serbian astronomer Petar Đurković at Uccle Observatory in Belgium. The Minor Planet Center only recognizes the first discoverer. A first precovery of Lomonosowa was taken at the Lowell Observatory in October 1905. The asteroid was first identified as 1933 SG_{1} at Heidelberg Observatory in September 1933.

== Orbit and classification ==
Lomonosowa is a non-family asteroid of the main belt's background population. It orbits the Sun in the central asteroid belt at a distance of 2.3–2.8 AU once every 4.01 years (1,464 days). Its orbit has an eccentricity of 0.09 and an inclination of 16° with respect to the ecliptic. The body's observation arc begins with its first precovery at Lowell Observatory in October 1905.

== Naming ==
This minor planet was named after Russian physicist and astronomer Mikhail Lomonosov (1711–1765). He discovered the atmosphere of Venus and the principle of mass conservation. The official naming citation was published by the Minor Planet Center in June 1955 (M.P.C. 1252). He is also honored by the craters Lomonosov on the Moon and Lomonosov on Mars.

== Physical characteristics ==
Lomonosowa has been characterized as a common, stony S-type asteroid.

=== Lightcurves ===
Several rotational lightcurve of Lomonosowa have been obtained from photometric observations since the 1980s. Lightcurve analysis gave a rotation period between 24.482 and 24.71 hours with a brightness amplitude of 0.45 to 0.63 magnitude (U=2/3/2). The asteroid's lightcurve has also been modeled using photometric observations from various sources. Modelling gave a concurring sidereal period of 24.4845 and 24.4846 hours. One study also found two spin axis of (72.0°, −84.0°) and (265.0°, −46.0°) in ecliptic coordinates (λ, β).

=== Diameter and albedo ===
According to the surveys carried out by the Japanese Akari satellite and the NEOWISE mission of NASA's Wide-field Infrared Survey Explorer, Lomonosowa measures between 18.690 and 20.45 kilometers in diameter and its surface has an albedo between 0.1584 and 0.218. The Collaborative Asteroid Lightcurve Link assumes a standard albedo for stony asteroids of 0.20 and derives a diameter of 17.82 kilometers based on an absolute magnitude of 11.11.
