= Ernest Harry Vestine =

American geophysicist and meteorologist

Ernest Harry Vestine (May 9, 1906 – July 18, 1968) was an American geophysicist and meteorologist.

He was born in Minneapolis, Minnesota to Swedish parents. At the age of two his family moved to Alberta, Canada, where he was raised. He earned a B.S. in math and physics in 1931 from the University of Alberta. The following year he joined the Canadian Meteorological Office in Toronto. During the Second International Polar Year, 1932–3, he led a Canadian expedition to Meanook, which lies in the northern part of Alberta. The team established a magnetic observatory at the site. In 1934 he left to study at the University of London, where in 1937 he earned a Ph.D. in applied mathematics.

During the early 1930s he began a collaboration with the Carnegie Institution of Washington, and in January, 1938 he was hired as an assistant by the institute's Department of Terrestrial Magnetism. He was soon promoted to chief of the department's Land Magnetic Survey section. In 1946 he became the head of the Section on Theoretical Geophysics. In 1947, E. H. Vestine et al. produced a comprehensive, two-volume work detailing all the geomagnetic data of the department. In addition to his research into geomagnetics, he collaborated with studies into seismology and cosmic rays.

In 1957 he performed work relating to the International Geophysical Year. The same year he left the Department of Terrestrial Magnetism to join the RAND Corporation. There he performed studies on planetary and space science, as well as issues concerning national security. From 1964 until 1968 he served as president of the American Geophysical Union's Geomagnetism section.

He died in Santa Monica, California.

His son, Henry Vestine, became a famous guitarist, playing with Frank Zappa's The Mothers of Invention and Canned Heat.

The crater Vestine on the Moon is named after him.

== Bibliography ==
This is a partial list of some of Dr. Vestine's publications.

- EH Vestine, "Noctilucent clouds", J. Roy. Astron. Soc. Can. 28, 1934.
- EH Vestine et al., "The Description of the Earth’s Main Magnetic Field and Its Secular Change, 1905-1945", 1947.
- EH Vestine et al., "The Geomagnetic Field: Its Description and Analysis", 1947.
- EH Vestine et al., "The geomagnetic field, its description and analysis", 1959.
- EH Vestine, "On Variations of the Geomagnetic Field, Fluid Motions, and the Rate of the Earth's Rotation", Proc Natl Acad Sci, 1952, December; 38(12).
- EH Vestine, "Polar, Magnetic, Auroral, and Ionospheric Phenomena", Rev. Mod. Phys. 32, 1960.
