= 5148 Giordano =

Main-belt asteroid

Discovery
- Discovered by: C. J. van Houten; I. van Houten G. T. Gehrels
- Discovery site: Palomar Obs.
- Discovery date: 17 October 1960

Designations
- Named after: Giordano Bruno (Italian friar and heretic)
- Alternative designations: 5557 P-L · 1974 CS; 1980 GC_{1}
- Minor planet category: main-belt · (outer) background · Themis

Orbital characteristics
- Epoch 23 March 2018 (JD 2458200.5)
- Uncertainty parameter 0
- Observation arc: 57.33 yr (20,940 d)
- Aphelion: 3.5690 AU
- Perihelion: 2.6606 AU
- Semi-major axis: 3.1148 AU
- Eccentricity: 0.1458
- Orbital period (sidereal): 5.50 yr (2,008 d)
- Mean anomaly: 301.66°
- Mean motion: 0° 10^{m} 45.48^{s} / day
- Inclination: 1.1261°
- Longitude of ascending node: 346.73°
- Argument of perihelion: 227.45°

Physical characteristics
- Mean diameter: 6.06 km (calculated); 8.112±0.388 km 8.5±1.7 km
- Synodic rotation period: 7.824±0.0038 h
- Geometric albedo: 0.07±0.03; 0.08 (assumed); 0.0889±0.0250; 0.089±0.025
- Spectral type: C
- Absolute magnitude (H): 13.7 · 13.90; 13.996±0.011 (R); 14.45

5148 Giordano, provisional designation 5557 P-L, is a background asteroid from the outer regions of the asteroid belt, approximately 8 kilometers (5 miles) in diameter. It was discovered on 17 October 1960, by Dutch astronomer couple Ingrid and Cornelis van Houten on photographic plates taken by Dutch–American astronomer Tom Gehrels at the Palomar Observatory in California, United States. It was named for Italian friar and heretic Giordano Bruno, who was burned at the stake in Rome in 1600. The presumably carbonaceous Themistian asteroid has a rotation period of 7.8 hours and possibly an elongated shape.

== Orbit and classification ==
Giordano is a non-family asteroid of the main belt's background population when applying the hierarchical clustering method to its proper orbital elements. Based on osculating Keplerian orbital elements, the asteroid has also been classified as a Themistian asteroid that belongs to the Themis family (602), a very large family of carbonaceous asteroids, named after 24 Themis.

It orbits the Sun in the outer asteroid belt at a distance of 2.7–3.6 AU once every 5 years and 6 months (2,008 days; semi-major axis of 3.11 AU). Its orbit has an eccentricity of 0.15 and an inclination of 1° with respect to the ecliptic. The body's observation arc begins at Palomar on 24 September 1960, less than a month prior to its official discovery observation.

== Physical characteristics ==
Giordano is an assumed carbonaceous C-type asteroid derived from the overall spectral type for Themistian asteroids.

=== Rotation period ===
In September 2010, a rotational lightcurve of Giordano was obtained from photometric observations in the R-band by astronomers at the Palomar Transient Factory in California. Lightcurve analysis gave a rotation period of 7.824 hours with a brightness amplitude of 0.60 magnitude, indicative for an elongated shape (U=2).

=== Diameter and albedo ===
According to the survey carried out by the NEOWISE mission of NASA's Wide-field Infrared Survey Explorer, Giordano measures 8.112 and 8.5 kilometers in diameter and its surface has an albedo of 0.089 and 0.07, respectively. The Collaborative Asteroid Lightcurve Link assumes an albedo of 0.08 and calculates a diameter of 6.06 kilometers based on an absolute magnitude of 14.45.

== Palomar–Leiden survey ==
The survey designation "P-L" stands for Palomar–Leiden, named after Palomar Observatory and Leiden Observatory, which collaborated on the fruitful Palomar–Leiden survey in the 1960s. Gehrels used Palomar's Samuel Oschin telescope (also known as the 48-inch Schmidt Telescope), and shipped the photographic plates to Ingrid and Cornelis van Houten at Leiden Observatory where astrometry was carried out. The trio are credited with the discovery of several thousand asteroid discoveries.

== Naming ==
This minor planet was named after an Italian Dominican friar Giordano Bruno (1548–1600), a philosopher, mathematician, poet, and cosmological theorist who spent many years in London, where several of his papers were published.

Bruno was convinced that the Copernican heliocentric rather than the Geocentric model was correct, and proposed that other worlds, on which people could live, might exist around other stars. This brought him in conflict with the church. He was found guilty of heresy by the Roman Inquisition and was burned at the stake in Rome in 1600. The official naming citation was published by the Minor Planet Center on 1 September 1993 (M.P.C. 22507). The asteroid's number, 5148, is a permutation of his birth year (1548). The lunar crater Giordano Bruno was also named in his honor. Another asteroid, 13223 Cenaceneri, was named after Bruno's work "The Dinner of the Ashes" (Italian: La Cena delle Ceneri), where he discusses the possibility of an infinite number of worlds in the universe.
