= Vashakidze (crater) =

Crater on the Moon

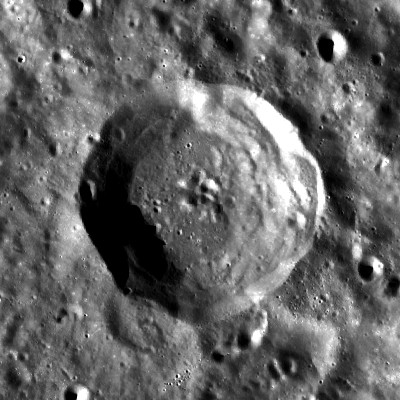
- LRO image
- Coordinates: 43.65°N 93.01°E
- Diameter: 44.99 km (27.96 mi)
- Depth: Unknown
- Colongitude: 187° at sunrise
- Eponym: Mikheil A. Vashakidze

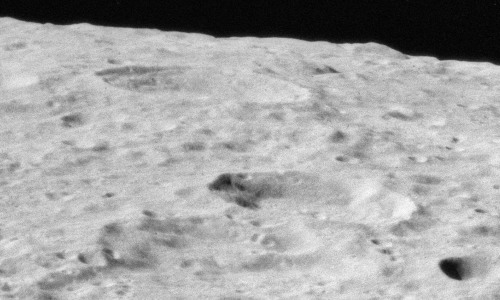
Oblique view from Apollo 16, showing Boss in upper left and Vashakidze in lower right

Vashakidze is a lunar impact crater that is located on the Moon's far side, just beyond the northeastern limb. This area of the surface is not completely hidden from the Earth, however, as suitable combinations of libration and sunlight will bring it into view. It was named by the IAU in 1970.

This crater has a well-defined rim that has not suffered much wear from impact erosion. It is roughly circular, with outward bulges to the south and east, giving it a slightly skewed appearance. The inner wall displays some slumping along the edges, particularly to the north and southeast, but little terrace development. The interior floor is relatively level with some irregularities in the eastern half.

The southeastern rim of this crater grazes the outer rim of the huge walled plain named Harkhebi. It lies to the southeast of the crater Boss and to the northeast of the ruined walled plain Riemann.
