= Giordano (footballer) =

Brazilian footballer (born 1993)

Personal information
- Full name: Giordano Müller Piffero
- Date of birth: 5 August 1993 (age 33)
- Place of birth: Porto Alegre, Rio Grande do Sul, Brazil
- Height: 1.84 m (6 ft 0 in)
- Position: Centre-back

Youth career
- 2010–2011: Internacional
- 2011: Caxias
- 2012: Canoas
- 2013: Cerâmica
- 2013: Vasco da Gama
- 2013: Juventude

Senior career*
| Years | Team | Apps | (Gls) |
| 2012 | Canoas | 0 | (0) |
| 2013 | Cerâmica | 0 | (0) |
| 2014 | Juventude | | |
| 2014 | → Brasil de Farroupilha (loan) | | |
| 2015–2016 | Beira-Mar | 6 | (1) |
| 2016 | Feirense | 0 | (0) |
| 2016–2017 | Atlético Tubarão | 0 | (0) |
| 2018 | Internacional-SM | 0 | (0) |
| 2018 | Real Sport Club | 0 | (0) |
| 2019 | Glória | | |
| 2019 | AC Kajaani | 25 | (3) |
| 2020 | Džiugas | | |
| 2020 | Almagro CF | 24 | (0) |
- * Club domestic league appearances and goals as of 20:21, 20 September 2022 (UTC)

Giordano Müller Piffero (born 5 August 1993), commonly known as Giordano, is a Brazilian footballer, playing in defender position.

== Career ==
On 20 February 2020, Lithuanian side FC Džiugas announced a contract with Giordano. However, the COVID-19 pandemic forced Giordano to return to Brazil in March. Lithuanian football season was about to restart at the beginning of June, but the pandemic in Brazil was getting worse, meaning that the player would not be able to return in time. The contract was terminated by mutual consent on 12 May with Giordano having not played a single game.

== Career statistics ==
=== Club ===
As of 4 May 2019.

| Club | Season | League | | | State League | | National Cup | | Other | | Total | |
| Club | Season | Division | Apps | Goals | Apps | Goals | Apps | Goals | Apps | Goals | Apps | Goals |
|---|---|---|---|---|---|---|---|---|---|---|---|---|
| Canoas | 2012 | Série C | 0 | 0 | 0 | 0 | 0 | 0 | 0 | 0 | 0 | 0 |
| Cerâmica | 2013 | – | | | 0 | 0 | 0 | 0 | 0 | 0 | 0 | 0 |
| Beira-Mar | 2014–15 | Segunda Liga | 6 | 1 | – | | 0 | 0 | 0 | 0 | 6 | 1 |
| Beira-Mar | 2015–16 | LigaPro | 0 | 0 | – | | 0 | 0 | 0 | 0 | 0 | 0 |
| Beira-Mar | Total | | 6 | 1 | 0 | 0 | 0 | 0 | 0 | 0 | 6 | 1 |
| Feirense | 2016 | – | | | 4 (Note: Appearances in the Campeonato Baiano) | 0 | 0 | 0 | 0 | 0 | 4 | 0 |
| Atlético Tubarão | 2017 | – | | | 1 (Note: Appearances in the Campeonato Catarinense A2) | 0 | 0 | 0 | 0 | 0 | 1 | 0 |
| Internacional-SM | 2018 | – | | | 5 (Note: Appearances in the Campeonato Gaúcho A2) | 0 | 0 | 0 | 0 | 0 | 5 | 0 |
| Real Sport Club | 2018 | – | | | 0 | 0 | 0 | 0 | 15 (Note: Appearances in the Copa FGF) | 1 | 15 | 1 |
| Kajaani | 2019 | Ykkönen | 1 | 0 | – | | 1 (Note: Appearances in the Finnish Cup) | 0 | 0 | 0 | 2 | 0 |
| Career total | | | 7 | 1 | 10 | 0 | 1 | 0 | 15 | 1 | 33 | 1 |
