= Maxwell (crater) =

Crater on the Moon

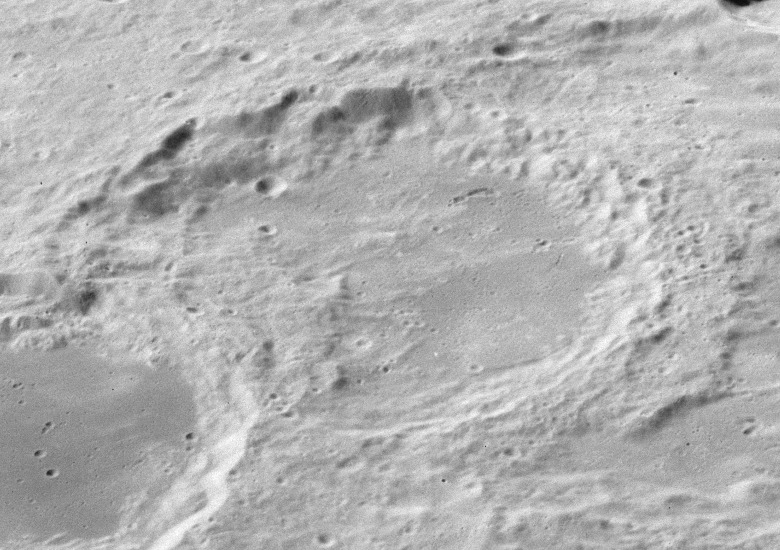
- Oblique Apollo 16 mapping camera image
- Coordinates: 30.2°N 98.9°E
- Diameter: 107 km
- Depth: Unknown
- Colongitude: 263° at sunrise
- Eponym: James C. Maxwell

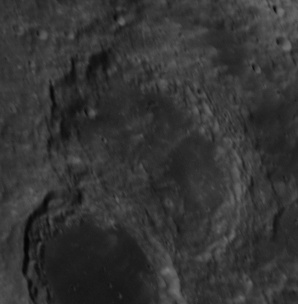
Oblique Apollo 14 Hasselblad camera image

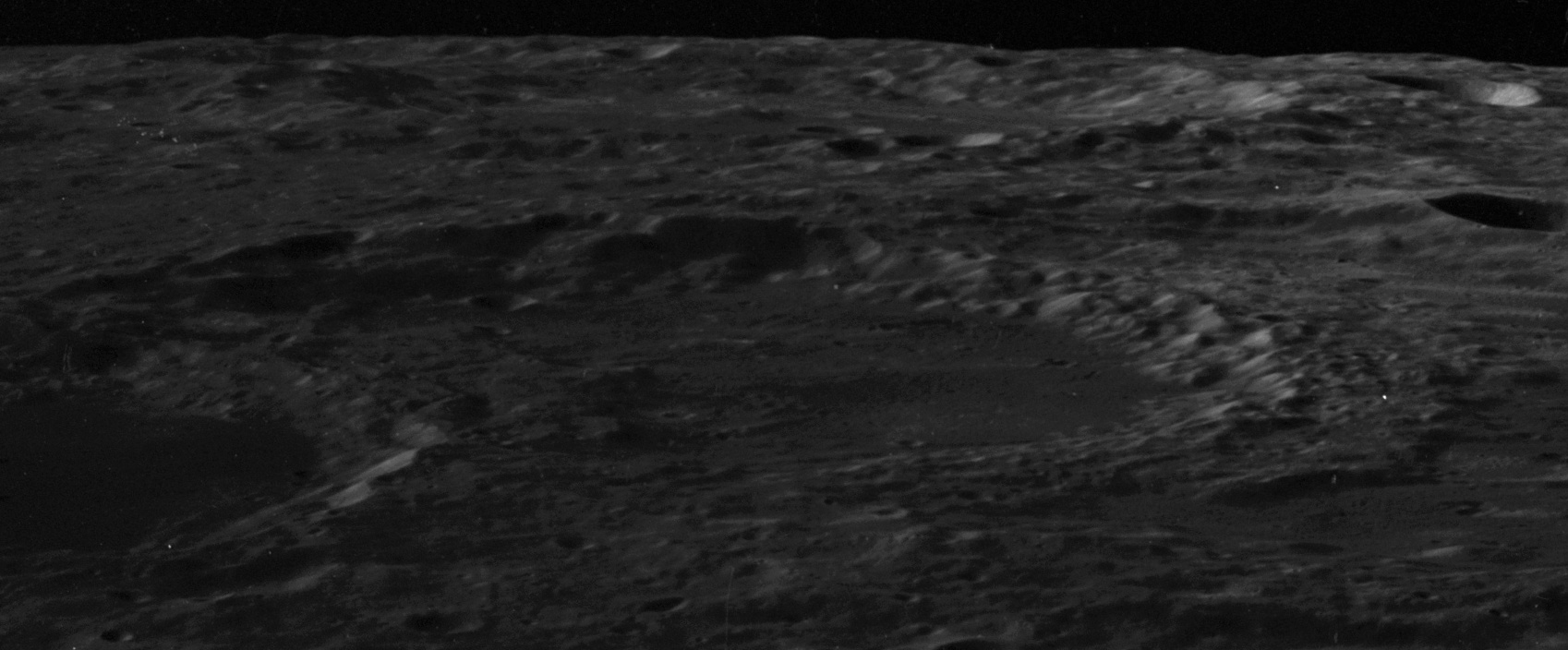
Oblique view from Apollo 14, facing northwest. Lomonosov is at left.

Maxwell is a crater on the far side of the Moon named after the physicist James C. Maxwell. It lies in the southwestern part of the larger crater Richardson. The southern part of Maxwell is overlain in turn by the partly flooded Lomonosov. Less than one crater diameter to the southwest is the larger Joliot.

The surviving outer rim of Maxwell is generally uneven and ill-defined where it overlies Richardson. Only along the western edge is it fairly well organized, but even there it is worn and eroded. The interior floor is relatively level and displays patches of low-albedo material, usually an indication of basaltic lava, possibly from impact melt. However the floor is dusted with material from the ray system of Giordano Bruno, located to the north-northeast, which has lightened the surface. The southern part of the interior floor is overlain by the outer rampart of Lomonosov.

Prior to formal naming in 1961 by the IAU, this crater was known as Crater 112.
