= Lyapunov (crater) =

Crater on the Moon

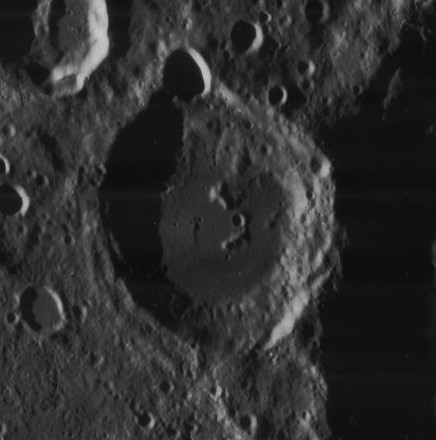
- Oblique Lunar Orbiter 4 image
- Coordinates: 26.3°N 89.3°E
- Diameter: 66 km
- Depth: Unknown
- Colongitude: 274° at sunrise
- Eponym: Alexander M. Lyapunov

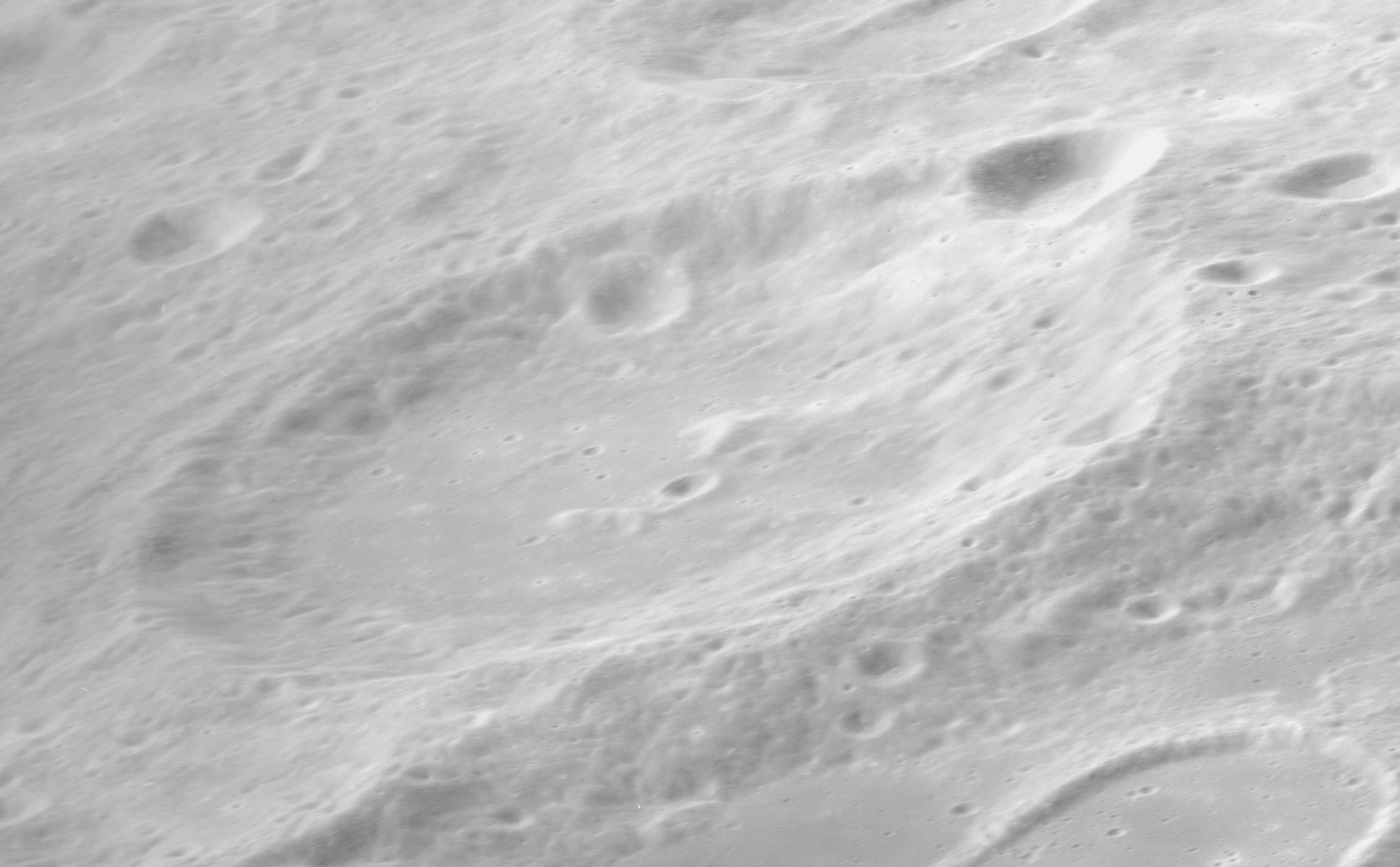
Oblique view from Apollo 16

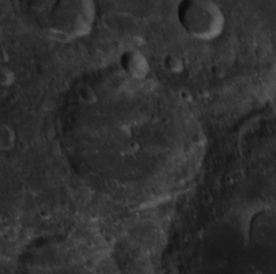
Oblique Apollo 14 Hasselblad camera image

Lyapunov is a lunar impact crater that is located along the east-northeastern limb of the Moon, and is viewed from the side by observers on Earth. The eastern rim of this crater just falls into the section of the Moon called the far side, and visibility of this formation is affected by libration.

This crater is attached to the south-southeastern rim of the larger walled plain called Rayleigh. It is also attached to the western rim of the much larger walled plain Joliot, a formation that lies entirely on the far side of the Moon. To the south-southwest of Lyapunov is the crater Hubble.

The shape of this crater's rim has been modified due to the large adjacent formations, so that it is somewhat polygonal rather than circular. The rim along the western side is less affected by reshaping, although it too is worn by impact erosion. The ejecta from nearby impacts partly covers the northern and some of the southeastern parts of the interior floor. The former forms a triangular section of rough ground that reaches to the midpoint of the floor. The remainder of the floor is relatively level and marked only by tiny craterlets.

This crater is named for Russian mathematician and engineer Aleksandr Lyapunov (1857–1918). Some publications list this crater as "Liapunov".
