= Joliot (crater) =

Crater on the Moon

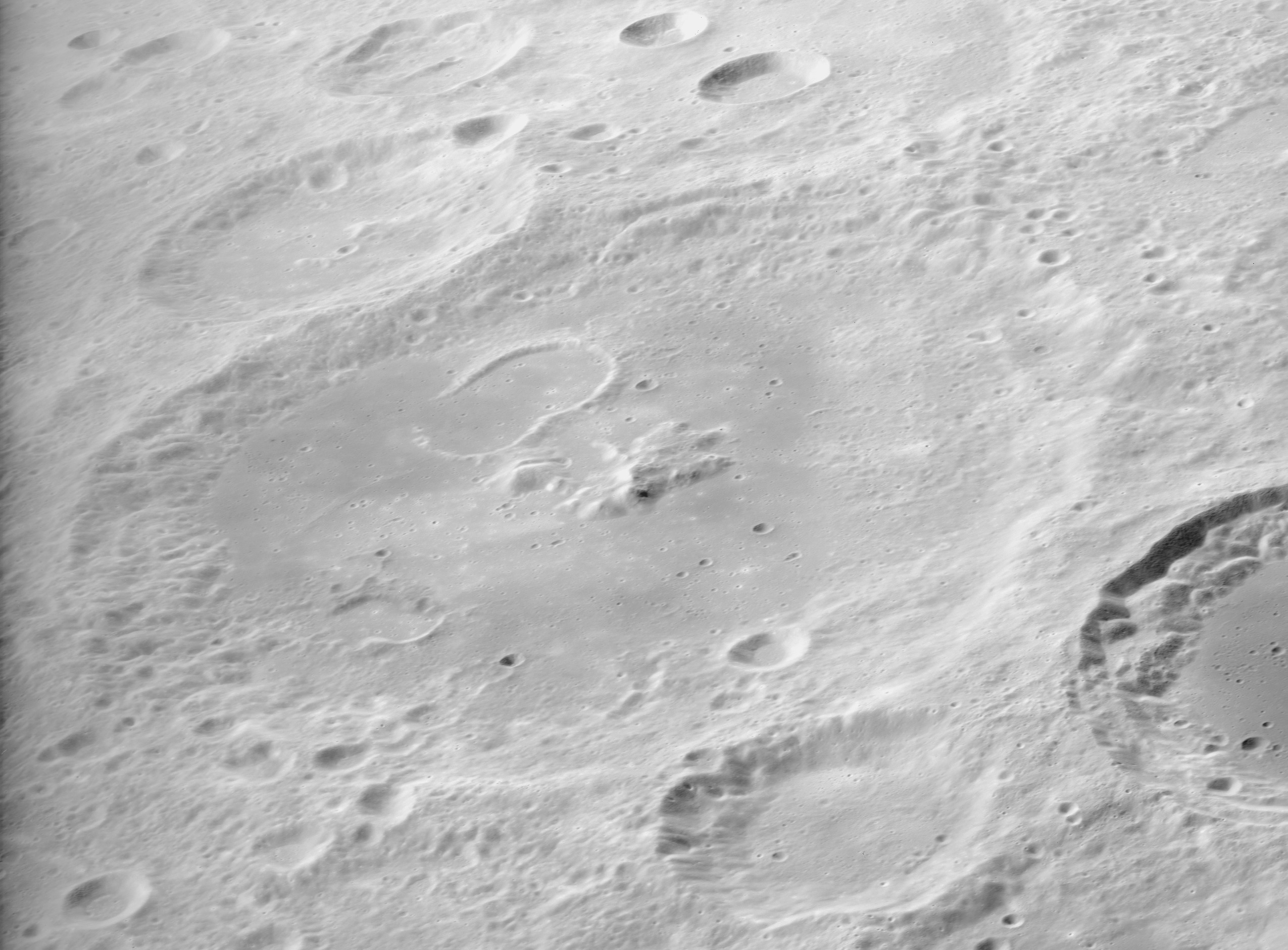
- Oblique Apollo 16 Panoramic camera image
- Coordinates: 25.8°N 93.1°E
- Diameter: 164 km
- Depth: Unknown
- Colongitude: 269° at sunrise
- Formation: Pre-Nectarian
- Eponym: Frédéric Joliot-Curie

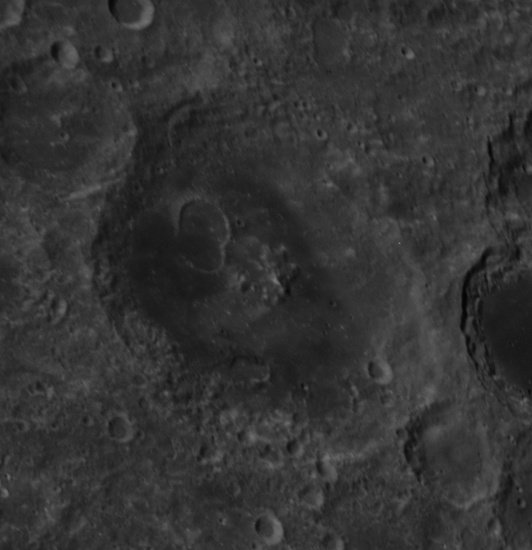
Oblique Apollo 14 Hasselblad camera image

Joliot (English: /ʒɔːˈljoʊ/ zhaw-LYOH, French: [ʒɔljo]) is a large lunar impact crater that lies on the far side of the Moon, just past the eastern limb. At this location it lies in a region of the surface that comes into sight during a favorable libration, although at such times it is viewed from the side. Thus viewing this crater in detail must be done from orbit.

The crater lies at the northern fringes of the lava-flooded region of the surface associated with Mare Marginis to the south. The crater Lomonosov is located just to the east-northeast, and Lyapunov is attached to the western rim. Also attached to the northwest rim, and thus adjacent to Lyapunov, is the crater Rayleigh. Southwest of Joliet is Hubble and farther to the south lies Al-Biruni.

== Description ==
The outer rim of Joliet is worn and somewhat degraded, particularly in the northern and southern sections where the outer wall consists of little more than irregular ridges and craterlets. The rim is more intact to the east, and particularly so in the west where it has been buttressed by adjacent crater formations.

Within the outer rim, the interior floor has been flooded in the past by basaltic lava, leaving a relatively flattened surface that has a lower albedo than the surrounding terrain and so appears darker. Parts of the floor have been coated in ray material from the fresh crater Giordano Bruno to the northeast.

The lava-covered floor contains several ghost-crater remnants, with the largest being an elongated formation to the west of the midpoint. At the midpoint of the floor is a central peak formation. The infrared spectrum of pure crystalline plagioclase has been identified on the central peak.

== Satellite craters ==
By convention these features are identified on lunar maps by placing the letter on the side of the crater midpoint that is closest to Joliot.

Joliot	Latitude	Longitude	Diameter
P	22.2° N	91.9° E	12 km
