= Boss (crater) =

Lunar impact crater

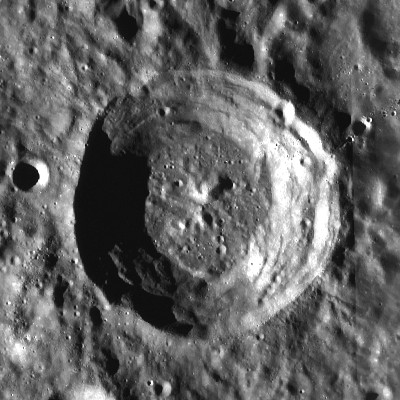
- LRO image
- Coordinates: 45.75°N 88.68°E
- Diameter: 50.20 km (31.19 mi)
- Depth: Unknown
- Colongitude: 274° at sunrise
- Eponym: Lewis Boss

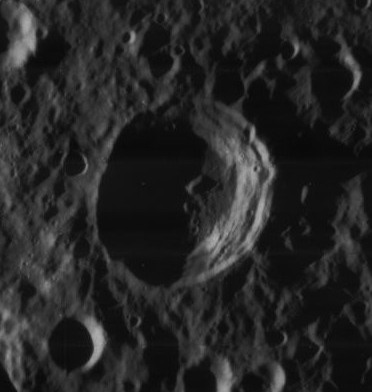
Oblique Lunar Orbiter 4 image

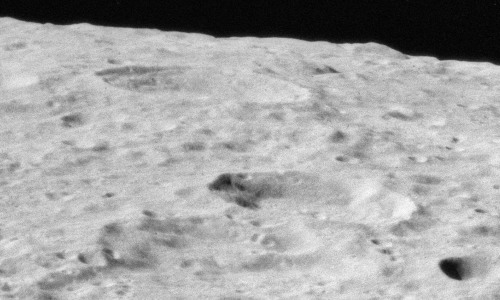
Oblique view from Apollo 16, showing Boss in upper left and Vashakidze in lower right

Boss is a lunar impact crater that is located along the northeast rim of the Moon's near side. Due to its location, the crater is viewed from the side by observers on the Earth, and its visibility is subject to libration effects. The closest named craters are Vashakidze to the southeast on the far side of the Moon, and the heavily eroded Riemann to the south. Further to the southwest is the prominent crater Gauss, and to the north-northwest is the Mare Humboldtianum.

This formation has not been significantly eroded by impacts, and it retains a well-defined outer rim that is not overlain by smaller craters of note. The inner wall is wide and has a terraced surface. The interior floor has a low central peak that is offset slightly to the north from the midpoint.

This crater is named after American astronomer Lewis Boss (1846–1912). His name was introduced into lunar nomenclature by David W. G. Arthur and Ewen Whitaker with the Rectified Lunar Atlas (1963). Its designation was formally adopted by the International Astronomical Union in 1964.

== Satellite craters ==
By convention these features are identified on lunar maps by placing the letter on the side of the crater midpoint that is closest to Boss.

Boss	Latitude	Longitude	Diameter
A	52.3° N	80.3° E	27 km
B	52.0° N	77.1° E	12 km
C	52.2° N	76.4° E	21 km
D	44.9° N	87.4° E	15 km
F	54.5° N	86.8° E	36 km
K	49.6° N	80.7° E	19 km
L	50.9° N	82.3° E	40 km
M	52.0° N	83.8° E	13 km
N	52.2° N	85.2° E	16 km
