= Harkhebi (crater) =

Lunar impact crater

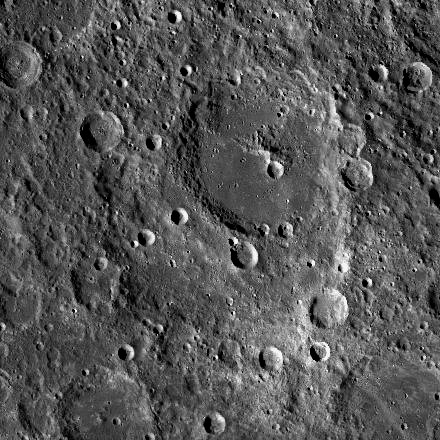
- LRO image
- Coordinates: 40.87°N 98.74°E
- Diameter: 337.14 km (209.49 mi)
- Depth: Unknown
- Colongitude: 266° at sunrise
- Eponym: Harkhebi

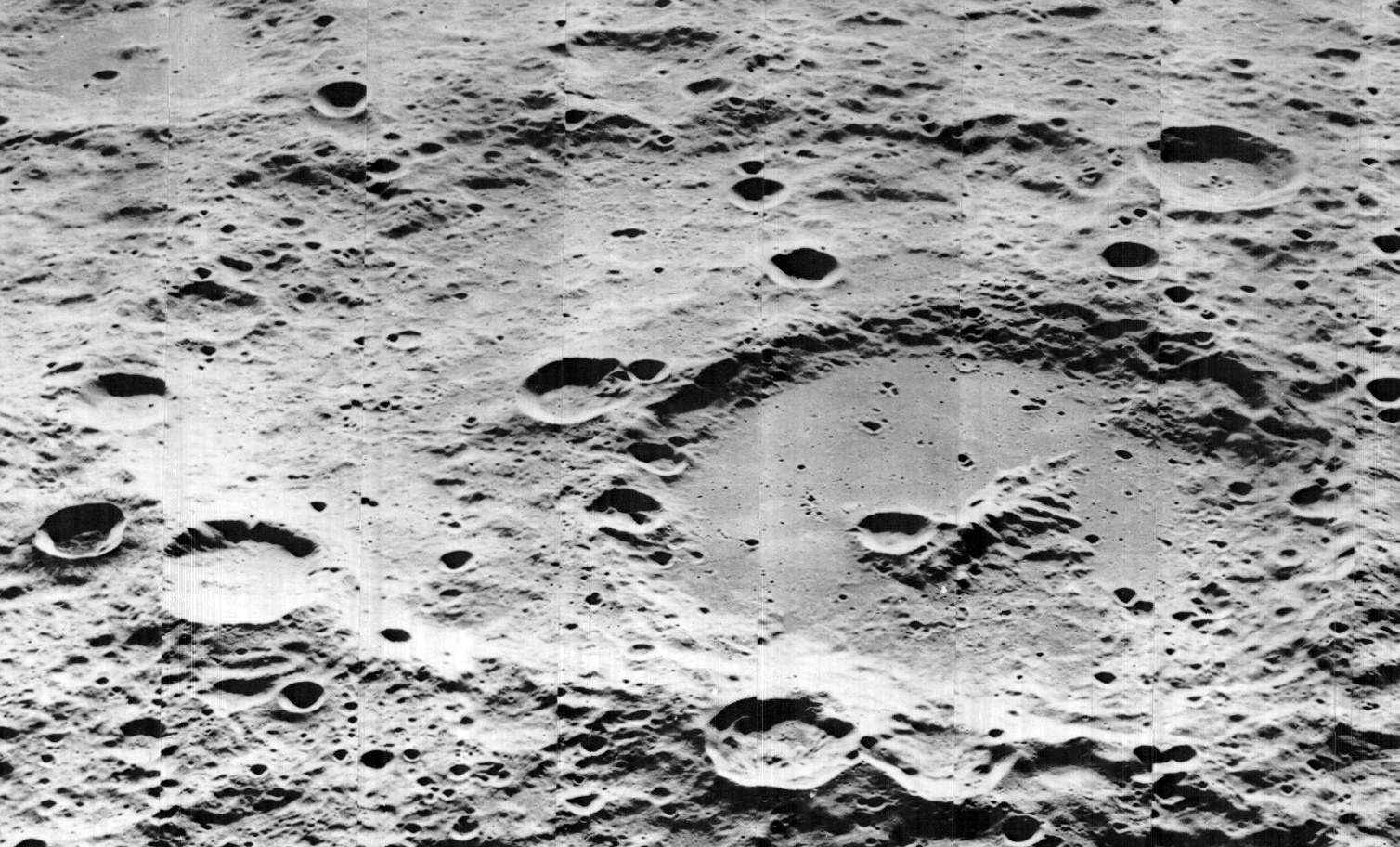
Oblique Lunar Orbiter 5 image, facing west

Harkhebi is a large lunar impact crater of the category termed a walled plain, on the far side. It dates to the Pre-Nectarian period of the lunar geologic timescale. Half of the crater to the north-northeast is overlain by the walled plain called Fabry, a large formation in its own right. Attached to the northwestern rim is the much smaller crater Vashakidze. To the southwest lies Vestine, and to the south is Richardson.

What survives of the outer rim of Harkhebi is worn and eroded by impacts, leaving little of the original formation intact. To the southeast, sections of the rim are overlain by the satellite craters Harkhebi J and Harkhebi K. The remainder of the rim is irregular in form, creating an arc of rugged ridges, incisions, and small craters. Most of the interior floor is also uneven and rough in places, although somewhat less so than the surrounding terrain. Several small, bowl-shaped craters lie across the interior floor, including Harkhebi H next to the southern rim of Fabry.

Just to the southeast of Harkhebi is the young crater Giordano Bruno, a formation with a relatively high albedo lying at the center of a ray system. Streaks of this ray material lie across several parts of the interior floor of Harkhebi, and one of the rays spans the floor from southeast to northwest.

Prior to formal naming in 1979 by the IAU, this crater was known as Basin I.

== Satellite craters ==
By convention these features are identified on lunar maps by placing the letter on the side of the crater midpoint that is closest to Harkhebi.

Harkhebi	Latitude	Longitude	Diameter
H	39.3° N	99.8° E	30 km
J	37.4° N	103.4° E	40 km
K	35.7° N	100.8° E	27 km
T	40.1° N	95.7° E	16 km
U	40.8° N	97.0° E	18 km
W	43.5° N	95.7° E	17 km
