= Imbrian =

Lunar geologic period

Chronology
Periods on the Lunar Geologic Timescale. Axis scale: Millions of years ago.

Usage information
- Celestial body: Earth's Moon
- Time scale(s) used: Lunar Geologic Timescale

Definition
- Chronological unit: Period

The Imbrian is a lunar geologic period divided into two epochs, the Early and Late.

== Early Imbrian ==
In the lunar geologic timescale, the Early Imbrian epoch occurred from 3,850 million years ago to about 3,800 million years ago. It overlaps the end of the Late Heavy Bombardment of the Inner Solar System. The impact that created the huge Mare Imbrium basin occurred at the start of the epoch. The other large basins that dominate the lunar near side (such as Mare Crisium, Mare Tranquillitatis, Mare Serenitatis, and Mare Fecunditatis) were also formed in this period. These basins filled with basalt mostly during the subsequent Late Imbrian epoch. The Early Imbrian was preceded by the Nectarian.

== Late Imbrian ==
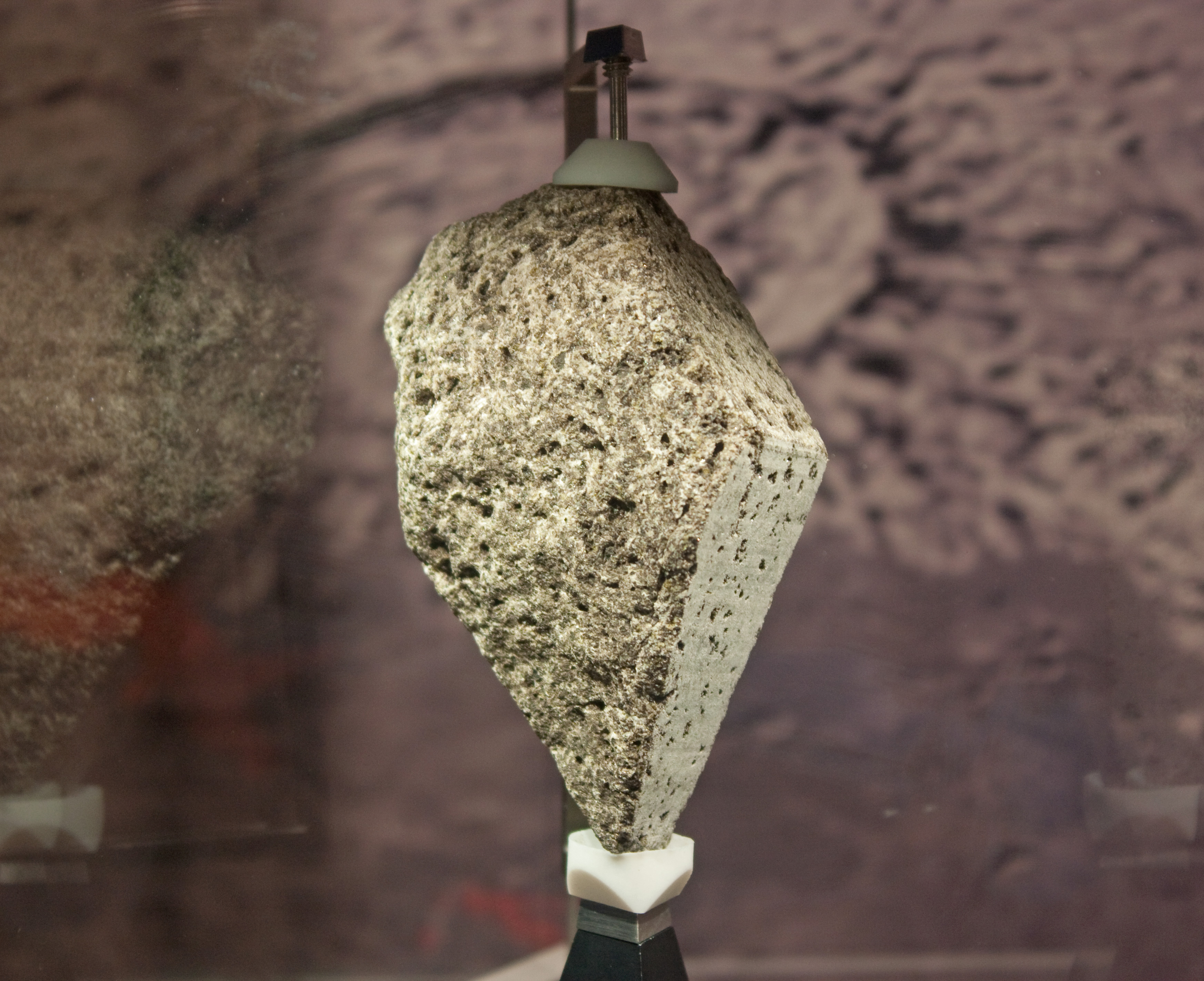
Lunar olivine basalt formed around 3.3 billion years ago. This is part of sample 15555, known as Great Scott.

In the Lunar geologic timescale, the Late Imbrian epoch occurred from 3,800 million years ago to about 3,200 million years ago. It was the epoch during which the mantle below the lunar basins partially melted and filled them with basalt. The eruptions are thought to have created a thin atmosphere around the moon largely consisting of carbon monoxide and sulfur. This atmosphere would have resulted in a surface pressure of ~1kPa and would have persisted for ~70 million years after its formation and peak thickness around ~3.5 Ga. The melting is thought to have occurred because the impacts of the Early Imbrian thinned the overlying rock – either causing the mantle to rise because of the reduced pressure on it, bringing molten material closer to the surface, or the top melting as heat flowed upwards through the mantle because of reduced overlying thermal insulation. The majority of lunar samples returned to earth for study come from this epoch.
