= Giordano Bruno (crater) =

Impact crater on the far side of the Moon

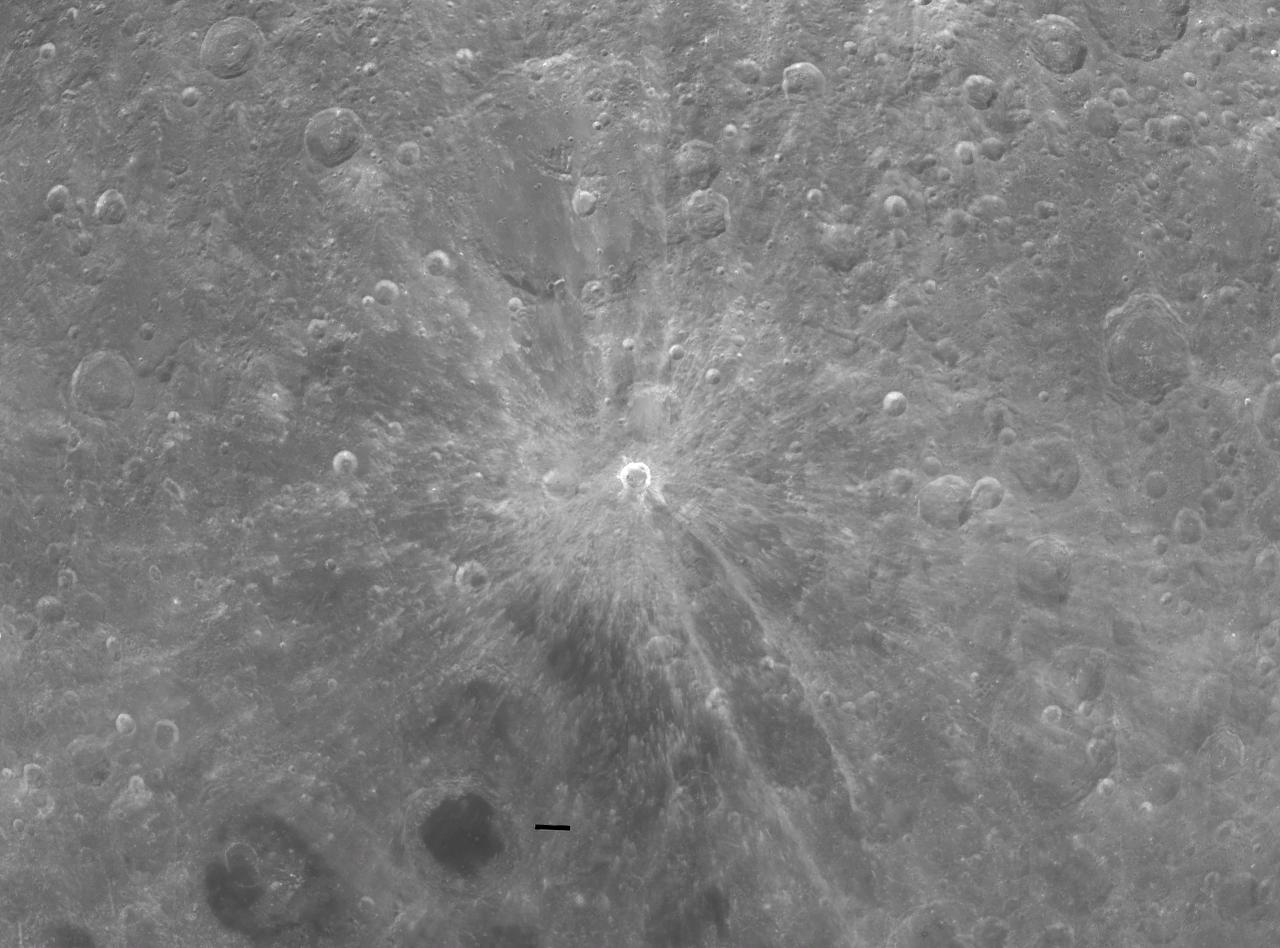
- Giordano Bruno. NASA photo
- Coordinates: 35.97°N 102.89°E
- Diameter: 22.13 km (13.75 mi)
- Depth: Unknown
- Colongitude: 258° at sunrise
- Formation: Copernican
- Eponym: Giordano Bruno

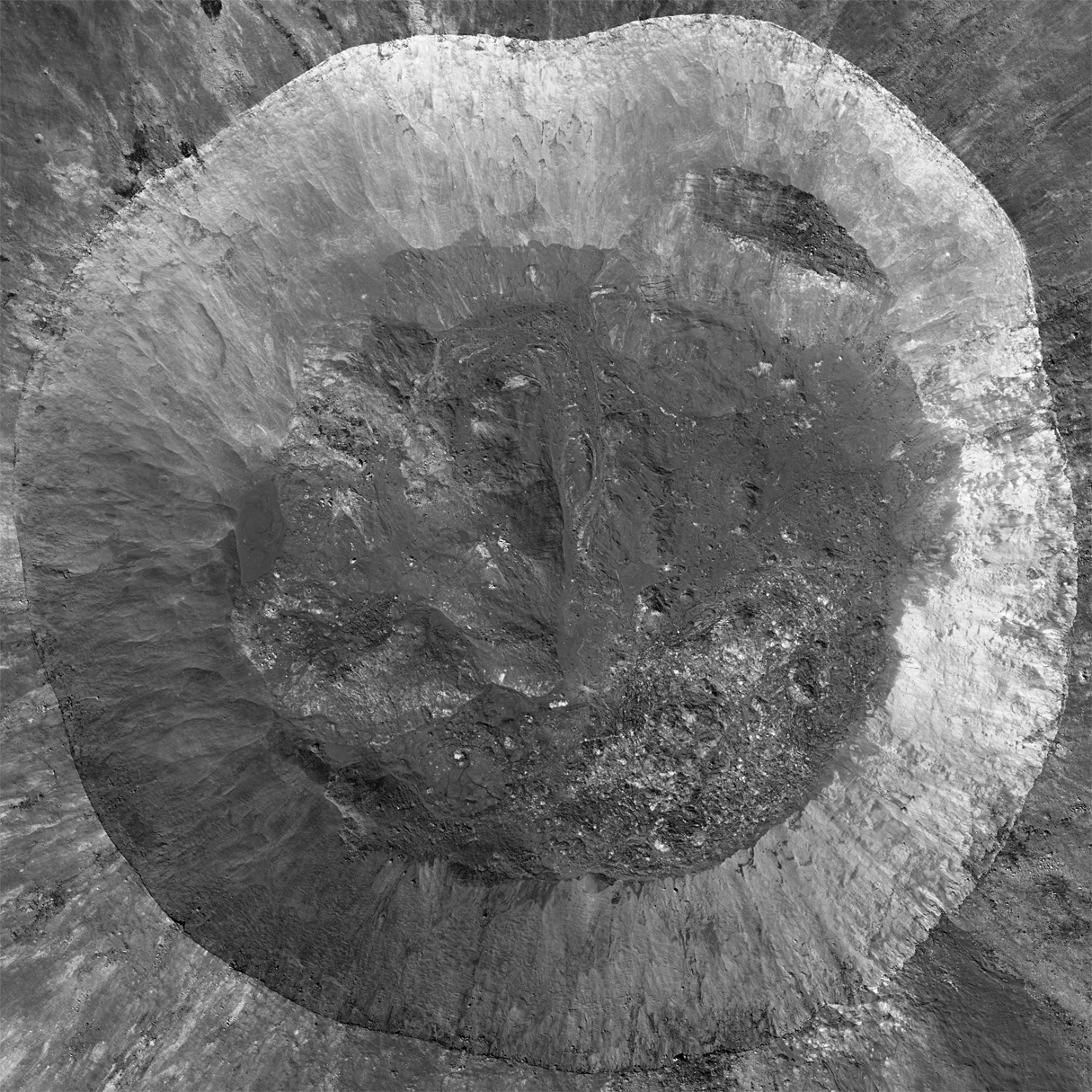
LRO mosaic

Giordano Bruno is a 22-kilometre (14 mi) diameter lunar impact crater on the far side of the Moon, just beyond the northeastern limb. It lies in an area that can be viewed during a favorable libration, although the area is viewed from the side and not much detail can be seen. This formation lies between the craters Harkhebi to the northwest and Szilard to the southeast.

When viewed from orbit, Giordano Bruno is at the center of a symmetrical ray system of ejecta that has a higher albedo than the surrounding surface. The ray material extends for over 150 kilometres (93 mi) and has not been significantly darkened by space erosion. Some of the ejecta appear to extend as far as the crater Boss, over 300 kilometres (190 mi) to the northwest. The infrared spectrum of pure crystalline plagioclase has been identified on the ejecta to the west and northwest.

The outer rim of the crater is especially bright compared to its surroundings. It retains a sharp edge that has scarcely been worn by subsequent impacts. To all appearances, this is a young formation that was created in the relatively recent past, geologically speaking. Based on photos from a lunar orbiter, the crater's age has been estimated at 4 million years.

This feature was named after Italian intellectual Giordano Bruno by the IAU in 1961.

== Formation ==
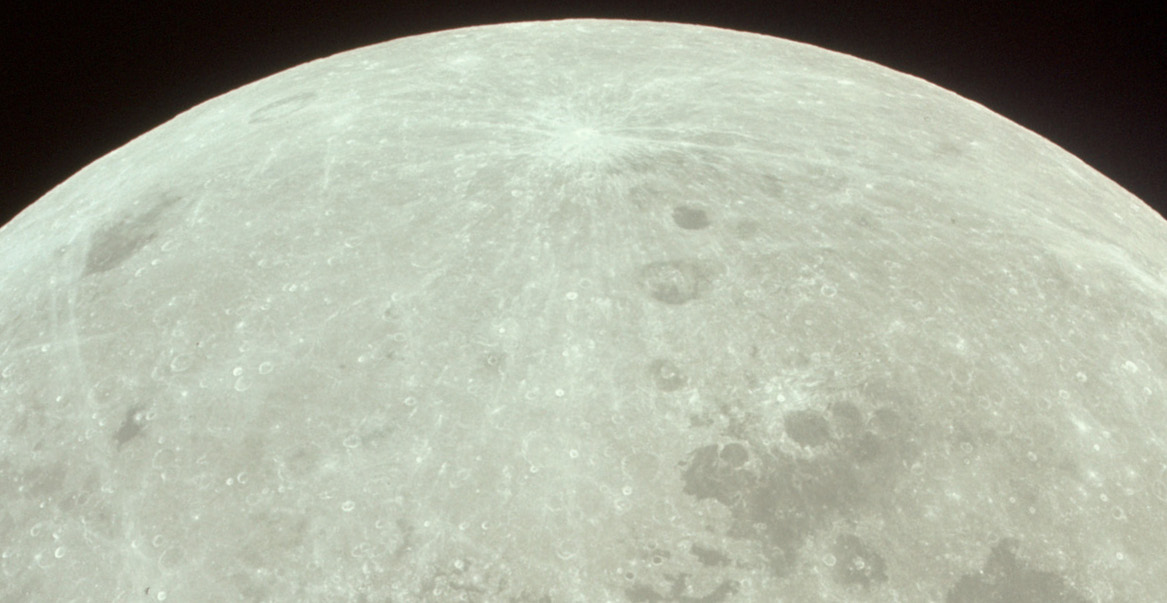
Oblique view from Apollo 11 showing the extent of the rays. Mare Marginis is in the right foreground.

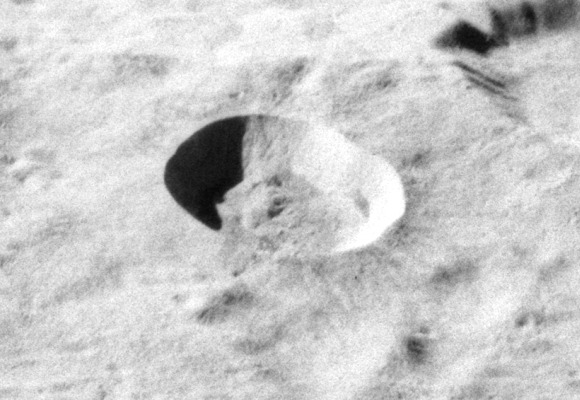
Oblique view from Apollo 16

Five witnesses from Canterbury reported to the abbey's chronicler, Gervase, that shortly after sunset on 18 June 1178, they saw "the upper horn [of the moon] split in two". Furthermore, Gervase writes:

From the midpoint of the division a flaming torch sprang up, spewing out, over a considerable distance, fire, hot coals and sparks. Meanwhile the body of the Moon which was below writhed, as it were in anxiety, and to put it in the words of those who reported it to me and saw it with their own eyes, the Moon throbbed like a wounded snake. Afterwards it resumed its proper state. This phenomenon was repeated a dozen times or more, the flame assuming various twisting shapes at random and then returning to normal. Then, after these transformations, the Moon from horn to horn, that is along its whole length, took on a blackish appearance.

In 1976, the geologist Jack B. Hartung proposed that this described the formation of the crater Giordano Bruno.

Modern theories predict that a (conjectural) asteroid or comet impact on the Moon would create a plume of ejecta rising up from the surface, which is consistent with the monks' description. The impact would be expected to perturb the Moon's motions, and laser rangefinding measurements of its libration in longitude were judged to be of the expected magnitude for such an event. In addition, the location recorded fits in well with the crater's location. Additional evidence of Giordano Bruno's youth is its spectacular ray system. The ratio of the length of these rays to the diameter of the crater is the largest for a large crater on the Moon, suggesting it is the youngest such crater. Because micrometeorites constantly rain down, they kick up enough dust to quickly (in geological terms) erode a ray system.

However, these observations do not resolve the question of the crater's age. The expected odds of formation of a lunar crater of that size in the last 3,000 years are on the order of 0.1%. The impact creating the 22-km-wide crater would have kicked up 10 million tonnes (10 billion kilograms) of debris, triggering a week-long, blizzard-like meteor storm on Earth – yet no accounts of such a noteworthy storm of unprecedented intensity are found in any known historical records, including the European, Chinese, Arabic, Japanese and Korean astronomical archives. This discrepancy is a major objection to the theory that Giordano Bruno was formed at that time. Also, much older craters, e.g., Tycho at 108 million years and Copernicus at an estimated 800 million years, still have prominent ray systems.

High-resolution images obtained by the Japanese satellite SELENE in 2008 were used to date the crater by counting the smaller craters within it and its ejecta deposits. This gave an age of 4+6
−3 million years, much too old for the hypothesis. Further scientific studies have strengthened this age.

This raises the question of what the monks saw. An alternative theory holds that the monks just happened to be in the right place at the right time to see an exploding meteor coming at them and aligned with the Moon. This would explain why the monks were the only people known to have witnessed the event; such an alignment would only be observable from a specific spot on the Earth's surface.

== Ejected asteroid ==
In 2021, the 40–100 m (130–330 ft) asteroid 469219 Kamoʻoalewa, which is a quasi-satellite of Earth (orbiting the Sun with the same period and phase as the Earth, appearing to orbit the Earth when viewed from there) was found to have a chemical composition similar to that of the lunar surface. After limiting crater size based on simulations of impacts that could eject a piece this large into a quasi-satellite orbit, and limiting crater age to between 1 and 10 million years based on the instability of the asteroid's orbit, a 2024 study found that the most likely origin is the Giordano Bruno crater.

== Extension of southwestern ejectaray from Giordano Bruno, east of Mare Crisium ==
East of Mare Crisium and north of Mare Marginis, near the eastern limb of the moon's near side, it is possible, during favourable libration, to observe the extension of the southwestern ejectaray from Giordano Bruno. This extension is also noticeable on the photographic version of chart LAC 45 (page 90) in The Clementine Atlas of the Moon (Ben Bussey / Paul D. Spudis).

== See also ==
- 5148 Giordano, asteroid

== Sources ==
- Andersson, L. E.; Whitaker, E. A. (1982). NASA Catalogue of Lunar Nomenclature. NASA RP-1097.
- Blue, Jennifer (25 July 2007). "Gazetteer of Planetary Nomenclature". USGS.
- Bussey, B.; Spudis, P. (2004). The Clementine Atlas of the Moon. New York: Cambridge University Press. ISBN 978-0-521-81528-4.
- Cocks, Elijah E.; Cocks, Josiah C. (1995). Who's Who on the Moon: A Biographical Dictionary of Lunar Nomenclature. Tudor Publishers. ISBN 978-0-936389-27-1.
- McDowell, Jonathan (15 July 2007). "Lunar Nomenclature". Jonathan's Space Report. Archived from the original on 8 February 2012.
- Menzel, D. H.; Minnaert, M.; Levin, B.; Dollfus, A.; Bell, B. (1971). "Report on Lunar Nomenclature by the Working Group of Commission 17 of the IAU". Space Science Reviews. 12 (2): 136–186. Bibcode:1971SSRv...12..136M. doi:10.1007/BF00171763. S2CID 122125855.
- Moore, Patrick (2001). On the Moon. Sterling Publishing Co. ISBN 978-0-304-35469-6.
- Price, Fred W. (1988). The Moon Observer's Handbook. Cambridge University Press. ISBN 978-0-521-33500-3.
- Rükl, Antonín (1990). Atlas of the Moon. Kalmbach Books. ISBN 978-0-913135-17-4.
- Webb, Rev. T. W. (1962). Celestial Objects for Common Telescopes (6th revised ed.). Dover. ISBN 978-0-486-20917-3.
- Whitaker, Ewen A. (1999). Mapping and Naming the Moon. Cambridge University Press. ISBN 978-0-521-62248-6.
- Wlasuk, Peter T. (2000). Observing the Moon. Springer. ISBN 978-1-85233-193-1.
