= List of craters on the Moon: R–S =

The list of approved names in the Gazetteer of Planetary Nomenclature maintained by the International Astronomical Union includes the diameter of the crater and the person the crater is named for. Where a crater formation has associated satellite craters, these are detailed on the main crater description pages.

List of craters on the Moon

- A
- B
- C
- D
- E
- F
- G
- H
- I
- J
- K
- L
- M
- N
- O
- P
- Q
- R
- S
- T
- U
- V
- W
- X
- Y
- Z

== R ==
Crater	Coordinates	Diameter (km)	Approval Year	Eponym	Ref
Rabbi Levi	34.78°S 23.46°E	82.44	1935	Levi Ben Gershon (1288–1344)	WGPSN
Racah	13.5°S 179.87°W	71.91	1970	Giulio Racah (1909–1965)	WGPSN
Raimond	14.78°N 159.63°W	68.37	1970	Jean Jacques Raimond, Jr. (1903–1961)	WGPSN
Raman	26.96°N 55.16°W	10.17	1976	Chandrasekhara Venkata Raman (1888–1970)	WGPSN
Ramon	41.23°S 148.08°W	17.23	2006	Ilan Ramon (1954–2003)	WGPSN
Ramsay	40.02°S 145.04°E	61.28	1970	William Ramsay (1852–1916)	WGPSN
Ramsden	32.96°S 31.87°W	25.11	1935	Jesse Ramsden (1735–1800)	WGPSN
Rankine	3.87°S 71.49°E	10.48	1976	William John Macquorn Rankine (1820–1872)	WGPSN
Raspletin	22.41°S 151.75°E	45.52	1976	Aleksandr Andreyevich Raspletin (1908–1967)	WGPSN
Ravi	12.5°S 1.97°W	1.62	1976	(Indian male name)	WGPSN
Rayet	44.65°N 114.5°E	27.76	1970	Georges Antoine Pons Rayet (1839–1906)	WGPSN
Rayleigh	29.12°N 89.45°E	113.77	1964	John William Strutt, 3rd Baron Rayleigh (1842–1919)	WGPSN
Razumov	38.95°N 114.63°W	75.08	1970	Vladimir Vasilʹevich Razumov (1890–1967)	WGPSN
Réaumur	2.45°S 0.73°E	51.25	1935	René Antoine Ferchault de Réaumur (1683–1757)	WGPSN
Recht	9.76°N 123.99°E	19.96	1982	Albert William Recht (1892–1962)	WGPSN
Regiomontanus	28.28°S 1.09°W	126.64	1935	Regiomontanus (1436–1476)	WGPSN
Regnault	54.04°N 87.88°W	51.31	1935	Henri Victor Regnault (1810–1878)	WGPSN
Reichenbach	30.48°S 47.95°E	64.85	1935	Georg von Reichenbach (1772–1826)	WGPSN
Reimarus	47.69°S 60.42°E	47.62	1935	Nicolai Reymers Baer (circa 1550-circa 1600)	WGPSN
Reiner	6.92°N 54.98°W	29.85	1935	Vincentio Reinieri (unknown-1648)	WGPSN
Reinhold	3.28°N 22.86°W	43.28	1935	Erasmus Reinhold (1511–1553)	WGPSN
Repsold	51.31°N 78.41°W	108.65	1935	Johann Georg Repsold (1770–1830)	WGPSN
Resnik	34.15°S 150.84°W	22.16	1988	Judith Arlene Resnik (1949–1986)	WGPSN
Respighi	2.86°N 71.9°E	17.88	1976	Lorenzo Respighi (1824–1890)	WGPSN
Rhaeticus	0.03°N 4.92°E	44.43	1935	Georg Joachim Rheticus (1514–1576)	WGPSN
Rheita	37.1°S 47.17°E	70.81	1935	Anton Maria Schyrleus of Rheita (circa 1597–1660)	WGPSN
Riccioli	2.9°S 74.42°W	155.66	1935	Giovanni Battista Riccioli (1598–1671)	WGPSN
Riccius	37.02°S 26.43°E	71.79	1935	Augustine Riccius (flourished 1513) and Matteo Ricci (1552–1610)	WGPSN
Ricco	74.92°N 177.05°E	65.83	1970	Annibale Ricco (1844–1911)	WGPSN
Richards	7.7°N 140.09°E	16.8	1976	Theodore William Richards (1868–1928)	WGPSN
Richardson	30.93°N 99.89°E	162.56	1979	Owen Willans Richardson (1879–1959)	WGPSN
Riedel	48.89°S 140.05°W	49.14	1970	Klaus Riedel (1907–1944) and Walter Riedel (1902–1968)	WGPSN
Riemann	39.38°N 87.18°E	117.85	1964	Georg Friedrich Bernhard Riemann (1826–1866)	WGPSN
Ritchey	11.13°S 8.48°E	24.07	1935	George Willis Ritchey (1864–1945)	WGPSN
Rittenhouse	74.25°S 107.07°E	27.5	1970	David Rittenhouse (1732–1796)	WGPSN
Ritter	1.96°N 19.17°E	29.52	1935	Carl Ritter (1779–1859) and Georg August Dietrich Ritter (1826–1908)	WGPSN
Ritz	15.37°S 92.38°E	53.77	1970	Walther Ritz (1878–1909)	WGPSN
Robert	19.03°N 27.45°E	0.56	1976	(English male name)	WGPSN
Roberts	70.66°N 174.25°W	89.37	1970	Alexander William Roberts (1857–1938) and Sir Isaac Roberts (1829–1904)	WGPSN
Robertson	21.84°N 105.37°W	89.85	1970	Howard P. Robertson (1903–1961)	WGPSN
Robinson	59.06°N 46.03°W	24.09	1935	John Thomas Romney Robinson (1792–1882)	WGPSN
Rocca	12.89°S 72.89°W	84.06	1935	Giovanni Antonio Rocca (1607–1656)	WGPSN
Rocco	28.91°N 45°W	4.35	1976	(Italian male name)	WGPSN
Roche	42.37°S 136.54°E	152.67	1970	Édouard Albert Roche (1820–1883)	WGPSN
Romeo	7.53°N 122.68°E	7.15	1979	(Italian male name)	WGPSN
Römer	25.43°N 36.41°E	43.7	1935	Ole Rømer (1644–1710)	WGPSN
Röntgen	32.88°N 91.42°W	128.42	1964	Wilhelm Conrad Röntgen (1845–1923)	WGPSN
Rosa	20.31°N 32.3°W	0.82	1976	(Spanish female name)	WGPSN
Rosenberger	55.49°S 43.15°E	91.65	1935	Otto August Rosenberger (1800–1890)	WGPSN
Ross	11.67°N 21.74°E	24.49	1935	James Clark Ross (1800–1862) and Frank Elmore Ross (1874–1966)	WGPSN
Rosse	17.95°S 34.98°E	11.43	1935	William Parsons, 3rd Earl of Rosse (1800–1867)	WGPSN
Rosseland	40.82°S 130.68°E	67.66	1994	Svein Rosseland (1894–1985)	WGPSN
Rost	56.42°S 33.84°W	46.85	1935	Johann Leonhard Rost (1688–1727)	WGPSN
Rothmann	30.81°S 27.7°E	41.67	1935	Christopher Rothmann (unknown-1600)	WGPSN
Rowland	56.98°N 162.48°W	166.12	1970	Henry Augustus Rowland III (1848–1901)	WGPSN
Rozhdestvenskiy	84.99°N 157.89°W	181.15	1970	Dimitri Rozhdestvensky (1876–1940)	WGPSN
Rumford	28.81°S 169.8°W	60.83	1970	Count Rumford (1753–1814)	WGPSN
Runge	2.43°S 86.81°E	38.98	1973	Carle David Tolmé Runge (1856–1927)	WGPSN
Russell	26.51°N 75.55°W	103.37	1964	Henry Norris Russell (1877–1957) and John Russell (1745–1806)	WGPSN
Ruth	28.71°N 45.06°W	3.08	1976	(Hebrew female name)	WGPSN
Rutherford	10.56°N 137.09°E	15.98	1976	Ernest Rutherford (1871–1937)	WGPSN
Rutherfurd	61.15°S 12.25°W	49.98	1935	Lewis Morris Rutherfurd (1816–1892)	WGPSN
Rydberg	46.43°S 96.43°W	48.03	1970	Johannes Robert Rydberg (1854–1919)	WGPSN
Ryder	43.87°S 143.3°E	15.55	2006	Graham Ryder (1949–2002)	WGPSN
Rynin	46.78°N 103.73°W	77.88	1970	Nikolai Alexsevitch Rynin (1877–1942)	WGPSN

back to top

== S ==
Crater	Coordinates	Diameter (km)	Approval Year	Eponym	Ref
Sabatier	13.19°N 79.01°E	9.6	1979	Paul Sabatier (1854–1941)	WGPSN
Sabine	1.38°N 20.07°E	29.75	1935	Edward Sabine (1788–1883)	WGPSN
Sacrobosco	23.75°S 16.64°E	97.67	1935	Johannes de Sacrobosco (John Holywood, c. 1200–1256)	WGPSN
Saenger	4.49°N 102.8°E	74.57	1970	Eugen Saenger (1905–1964)	WGPSN
Šafařík	10.44°N 176.7°E	31.42	1970	Vojtěch Šafařík (1829–1902)	WGPSN
Saha	1.69°S 103.04°E	103.34	1970	Megh Nad Saha (1893–1956)	WGPSN
Samir	28.5°N 34.29°W	1.86	1979	(Arabic male name)	WGPSN
Sampson	29.58°N 16.53°W	1.83	1976	Ralph Allen Sampson (1866–1939)	WGPSN
Sanford	32.38°N 139.21°W	55.09	1970	Roscoe Frank Sanford (1883–1958)	WGPSN
Santbech	20.99°S 44.06°E	62.24	1935	Daniel Santbech Noviomagus (unknown-flourished 1561)	WGPSN
Santos-Dumont	27.79°N 4.75°E	8.8	1976	Alberto Santos-Dumont (1873–1932)	WGPSN
Sarabhai	24.75°N 21°E	7.38	1973	Vikram Ambalal Sarabhai (1919–1971)	WGPSN
Sarton	49.12°N 121.14°W	71.33	1970	George Alfred Leon Sarton (1884–1956)	WGPSN
Sasserides	39.28°S 9.44°W	81.74	1935	Gellio Sasceride (1562–1612)	WGPSN
Saunder	4.26°S 8.72°E	44.38	1935	Samuel Arthur Saunder (1852–1912)	WGPSN
Saussure	43.38°S 3.88°W	54.56	1935	Horace-Bénédict de Saussure (1740–1799)	WGPSN
Scaliger	27.26°S 109.14°E	86.4	1970	Joseph Justus Scaliger (1540–1609)	WGPSN
Schaeberle	26.33°S 117.71°E	56.74	1970	John Martin Schaeberle (1853–1924)	WGPSN
Scheele	9.45°S 37.85°W	4.69	1976	Carl Wilhelm Scheele (1742–1786)	WGPSN
Scheiner	60.35°S 27.81°W	110.07	1935	Christopher Scheiner (1575–1650)	WGPSN
Schiaparelli	23.38°N 58.82°W	24.2	1935	Giovanni Virginio Schiaparelli (1835–1910)	WGPSN
Schickard	44.38°S 55.11°W	212.18	1935	Wilhelm Schickard (1592–1635)	WGPSN
Schiller	51.72°S 39.78°W	179.36	1935	Julius Schiller (flourished 1627)	WGPSN
Schjellerup	69.04°N 158.24°E	62.82	1970	Hans Carl Frederik Christian Schjellerup (1827–1887)	WGPSN
Schlesinger	47.12°N 138.98°W	97.28	1970	Frank Schlesinger (1871–1943)	WGPSN
Schliemann	1.99°S 155.12°E	77.4	1970	Heinrich Schliemann (1822–1890)	WGPSN
Schlüter	5.93°S 83.39°W	87.55	1964	Heinrich Schlüter (1815–1844)	WGPSN
Schmidt	0.96°N 18.78°E	11.13	1935	Johann Friedrich Julius Schmidt (1825–1884), Bernhard Schmidt (1879–1935) and Otto Yulyevich Schmidt (1891–1956)	WGPSN
Schneller	41.34°N 163.73°W	56.87	1970	Herbert Schneller (1901–1967)	WGPSN
Schomberger	76.64°S 24.69°E	85.8	1935	Georg Schomberger (1597–1645)	WGPSN
Schönfeld	44.76°N 98°W	24.57	1970	Eduard Schönfeld (1828–1891)	WGPSN
Schorr	19.45°S 89.8°E	52.09	1970	Richard Schorr (1867–1951)	WGPSN
Schrödinger	74.73°S 132.93°E	316.39	1970	Erwin Schrödinger (1887–1961)	WGPSN
Schröter	2.74°N 6.98°W	36.67	1935	Johann Hieronymus Schröter (1745–1816)	WGPSN
Schubert	2.78°N 81.01°E	51.94	1935	Theodor von Schubert (1789–1865)	WGPSN
Schumacher	42.42°N 60.81°E	61.31	1935	Heinrich Christian Schumacher (1780–1850)	WGPSN
Schuster	4.44°N 146.42°E	100.08	1970	Arthur Schuster (1851–1934)	WGPSN
Schwabe	65.1°N 45.48°E	25.47	1935	Samuel Heinrich Schwabe (1789–1875)	WGPSN
Schwarzschild	70.08°N 121.57°E	211.42	1970	Karl Schwarzschild (1873–1916)	WGPSN
Scobee	31.36°S 149.64°W	41.53	1988	Francis Richard Scobee (1939–1986)	WGPSN
Scoresby	77.73°N 14.13°E	54.93	1935	William Scoresby (1789–1857)	WGPSN
Scott	82.35°S 48.52°E	107.82	1964	Robert Falcon Scott (1868–1912)	WGPSN
Seares	73.74°N 147.23°E	99.5	1970	Frederick Hanley Seares (1873–1964)	WGPSN
Secchi	2.4°N 43.56°E	22.13	1935	Pietro Angelo Secchi (1818–1878)	WGPSN
Sechenov	6.97°S 143.09°W	63.8	1970	Ivan Mikhailovich Sechenov (1829–1905)	WGPSN
Seeliger	2.22°S 3°E	8.28	1935	Hugo Hans Ritter von Seeliger (1849–1924)	WGPSN
Segers	46.99°N 127.52°E	17.28	1970	Carlos Segers (1900–1967)	WGPSN
Segner	58.96°S 48.68°W	67.84	1935	Johann Andreas von Segner (1704–1777)	WGPSN
Seidel	32.65°S 152.47°E	55.39	1970	Philipp Ludwig von Seidel (1821–1896)	WGPSN
Seleucus	21.09°N 66.66°W	45.01	1935	Seleucus of Seleucia (flourished circa 150 BC.)	WGPSN
Seneca	26.71°N 79.81°E	47.57	1961	Seneca the Younger (4 BC.-65 AD.)	WGPSN
Seyfert	29.26°N 114.34°E	102.63	1970	Carl Keenan Seyfert (1911–1960)	WGPSN
Shackleton	89.67°S 129.78°E	20.92	1994	Sir Ernest Henry Shackleton (1874–1922).	WGPSN
Shahinaz	7.58°N 122.42°E	15.99	1979	(Persian female name)	WGPSN
Shaler	32.89°S 85.27°W	48.47	1964	Nathaniel Southgate Shaler (1841–1906)	WGPSN
Shapley	9.35°N 56.83°E	24.82	1973	Harlow Shapley (1885–1972)	WGPSN
Sharonov	12.37°N 173.1°E	75.12	1970	Vsevolod Vasilievich Sharonov (1901–1964)	WGPSN
Sharp	45.75°N 40.22°W	37.61	1935	Abraham Sharp (1651–1742)	WGPSN
Shatalov	24.26°N 140.48°E	24.05	1970	Vladimir Aleksandrovich Shatalov (1927-)	WGPSN
Shayn	32.52°N 172.42°E	92.9	1970	Grigory Abramovich Shajn (1892–1956)	WGPSN
Sheepshanks	59.24°N 17.04°E	23.67	1935	Anne Sheepshanks (1789–1876)	WGPSN
Sherrington	11.13°S 118°E	18.8	1976	Sir Charles Scott Sherrington (1856–1952)	WGPSN
Shi Shen	75.78°N 104.13°E	46.52	1970	Shi Shen (fl. 4th century BC)	WGPSN
Shirakatsi	12.18°S 128.56°E	48.13	1979	Anania Shirakatsi (circa 620-circa 685)	WGPSN
Shoemaker	88.14°S 45.91°E	51.82	2000	Eugene Merle Shoemaker (1928–1997)	WGPSN
Short	74.54°S 7.68°W	67.94	1935	James Short (1710–1768)	WGPSN
Shternberg	19.38°N 116.82°W	74.36	1970	Pavel Karlovich Shternberg (Sternberg, 1865–1920)	WGPSN
Shuckburgh	42.65°N 52.71°E	37.73	1935	George Shuckburgh (1751–1804)	WGPSN
Shuleykin	27.11°S 92.67°W	14.67	1985	Mikhail Vasilʹevich Shuleykin (1884–1939)	WGPSN
Siedentopf	22.05°N 135.08°E	62.7	1970	Heinrich Siedentopf (1906–1963)	WGPSN
Sierpinski	26.93°S 154.81°E	66.94	1970	Wacław Sierpiński (1882–1969)	WGPSN
Sikorsky	65.89°S 103.65°E	97.67	1979	Igor Ivanovich Sikorsky (1889–1972)	WGPSN
Silberschlag	6.21°N 12.53°E	12.56	1935	Johann Esaias Silberschlag (1721–1791)	WGPSN
Simpelius	72.61°S 14.74°E	68.89	1935	Hugh Sempill (1596–1654)	WGPSN
Sinas	8.85°N 31.6°E	11.67	1935	Simon Sinas (1810–1876)	WGPSN
Sirsalis	12.49°S 60.51°W	44.17	1935	Gerolamo Sersale (1584–1654)	WGPSN
Sisakyan	41.07°N 109.13°E	35.6	1970	Norajr Martirosovich Sisakyan (1907–1966)	WGPSN
Sita	4.61°N 120.7°E	1.59	1976	(Indian female name)	WGPSN
Sklodowska	18.04°S 96.15°E	125.55	1961	Maria Skłodowska-Curie (1867–1934)	WGPSN
Slater	88.08°S 111.29°E	25.12	2015	David Slater (1957–2011)	WGPSN
Slava	38.3°N 35°W	0.1	2012	Slavic male name	WGPSN
Slipher	49.28°N 160.27°E	74.65	1970	Earl Charles Slipher (1883–1964) and Vesto Melvin Slipher (1875–1969)	WGPSN
Slocum	3.15°S 89.07°E	12.15	1976	Frederick Slocum (1873–1944)	WGPSN
Smith	31.79°S 151.01°W	32.87	1988	Michael John Smith (1945–1986)	WGPSN
Smithson	2.38°N 53.64°E	6.04	1976	James Smithson (1765–1829)	WGPSN
Smoluchowski	60.22°N 96.91°W	84.26	1970	Marian Smoluchowski (1872–1917)	WGPSN
Snellius	29.33°S 55.7°E	85.98	1935	Willebrord Snell (1591–1626)	WGPSN
Sniadecki	22.29°S 168.84°W	41.13	1970	Jan Sniadecki (1756–1830)	WGPSN
Soddy	0.45°N 121.77°E	40.79	1976	Frederick Soddy (1877–1956)	WGPSN
Somerville	8.33°S 64.96°E	17.08	1976	Mary Fairfax Somerville (1780–1872)	WGPSN
Sommerfeld	64.83°N 161.54°W	150.89	1970	Arnold Sommerfeld (1868–1951)	WGPSN
Sömmering	0.19°N 7.53°W	27.97	1935	Samuel Thomas Sömmering (1755–1830)	WGPSN
Soraya	12.87°S 1.63°W	1.9	1976	(Persian female name)	WGPSN
Sosigenes	8.7°N 17.6°E	16.99	1935	Sosigenes of Alexandria (flourished 46 BC.)	WGPSN
South	57.58°N 50.94°W	119.04	1935	James South (1785–1867)	WGPSN
Spallanzani	46.38°S 24.73°E	30.86	1935	Lazzaro Spallanzani (1729–1799)	WGPSN
Spencer Jones	13.06°N 165.84°E	88.19	1970	Sir Harold Spencer Jones (1890–1960)	WGPSN
Spörer	4.3°S 1.77°W	25.57	1935	Friederich Wilhelm Gustav Spörer (1822–1895)	WGPSN
Spudis	89.51°S 84.61°W	13	2021	Paul D. Spudis (1952–2018)	WGPSN
Spurr	27.91°N 1.27°W	13.21	1973	Josiah Edward Spurr (1870–1950)	WGPSN
St. John	10.07°N 149.98°E	66.74	1970	Charles Edward St. John (1857–1935)	WGPSN
Stadius	10.48°N 13.77°W	68.48	1935	Johannes Stadius (1527–1579)	WGPSN
Stark	25.43°S 134.59°E	47.72	1970	Johannes Stark (1874–1957)	WGPSN
Stearns	34.68°N 162.6°E	38.94	1979	Carl Leo Stearns (1892–1972)	WGPSN
Stebbins	64.36°N 142.64°W	129.74	1970	Joel Stebbins (1878–1966)	WGPSN
Stefan	46.33°N 108.77°W	112.18	1970	Josef Stefan (1835–1893)	WGPSN
Stein	7°N 179.11°E	30.72	1970	Johan Willem Jakob Antoon Stein (1871–1951)	WGPSN
Steinheil	48.71°S 46.66°E	63.28	1935	Karl August von Steinheil (1801–1870)	WGPSN
Steklov	36.73°S 105.05°W	36.61	1970	Vladimir Andreevich Steklov (1864–1926)	WGPSN
Stella	19.91°N 29.76°E	0.42	1976	(Latin female name)	WGPSN
Steno	32.61°N 161.78°E	32.29	1970	Nicolaus Steno (1638–1686)	WGPSN
Sternfeld	19.75°S 142.27°W	109.8	1991	Ary Abramovich Sternfeld (1905–1980)	WGPSN
Stetson	39.58°S 118.2°W	63.12	1970	Harlan True Stetson (1885–1964)	WGPSN
Stevinus	32.49°S 54.14°E	71.54	1935	Simon Stevin (1548–1620)	WGPSN
Stewart	2.15°N 66.98°E	13.77	1976	John Quincy Stewart (1894–1972)	WGPSN
Stiborius	34.49°S 31.99°E	43.76	1935	Andreas Stoberl (1465–1515)	WGPSN
Stöfler	41.24°S 5.93°E	129.87	1935	Johannes Stöffler (1452–1531)	WGPSN
Stokes	52.36°N 88.11°W	53.85	1964	Sir George Gabriel Stokes (1819–1903)	WGPSN
Stoletov	44.82°N 155.5°W	42.43	1970	Aleksandr Grigorievich Stoletov (1839–1896)	WGPSN
Stoney	55.58°S 156.38°W	47.51	1970	George Johnstone Stoney (1826–1911)	WGPSN
Störmer	57.14°N 146.65°E	68.62	1970	Fredrik Carl Mülertz Störmer (1874–1957)	WGPSN
Stose	86.38°S 32.13°E	16.7	2021	Anna Jonas Stose (1881–1974)	WGPSN
Strabo	61.94°N 54.42°E	54.72	1935	Strabo (54 BC.-24 AD.)	WGPSN
Stratton	5.6°S 164.7°E	69.76	1970	Frederick John Marrion Stratton (1881–1960)	WGPSN
Street	46.58°S 10.74°W	58.52	1935	Thomas Street (1621–1689)	WGPSN
Strömgren	21.74°S 132.37°W	62.17	1970	Elis Strömgren (1870–1947)	WGPSN
Struve	23.41°N 76.65°W	164.34	1964	Otto Wilhelm von Struve (1819–1905), Otto Struve (1897–1963) and Friedrich Georg Wilhelm von Struve (1793–1864)	WGPSN
Subbotin	29.32°S 135.71°E	71.66	1970	Mikhail Fedorovich Subbotin (1893–1966)	WGPSN
Suess	4.36°N 47.72°W	8.39	1935	Eduard Suess (1831–1914)	WGPSN
Sulpicius Gallus	19.63°N 11.68°E	11.61	1935	Gaius Sulpicius Gallus (flourished c. 166 BC)	WGPSN
Sumner	37.62°N 108.76°E	52.87	1970	Thomas Hubbard Sumner (1807–1876)	WGPSN
Sundman	10.76°N 91.69°W	41.04	1970	Karl Fritiof Sundman (1873–1949)	WGPSN
Susan	11°S 6.3°W	0.95	1976	(English female name)	WGPSN
Svedberg	81.68°S 65.15°E	15.34	2009	Theodor Svedberg (1884–1971)	WGPSN
Sverdrup	88.32°S 153.39°W	32.83	2000	Otto Sverdrup (1855–1930)	WGPSN
Swann	51.96°N 112.52°E	42.18	1970	William Francis Gray Swann (1884–1962)	WGPSN
Swasey	5.46°S 89.67°E	24.85	1976	Ambrose Swasey (1846–1937)	WGPSN
Swift	19.35°N 53.44°E	10.06	1976	Lewis Swift (1820–1913)	WGPSN
Sylvester	82.65°N 81.22°W	59.28	1964	James Joseph Sylvester (1814–1897)	WGPSN
Szilard	33.71°N 105.78°E	127.22	1970	Leó Szilárd (1898–1964)	WGPSN

back to top
