= Sternfeld =

Sternfeld (lit. 'star field') is a surname of German origin. Notable people with the surname include:

- Aenne Biermann, née Sternfeld (1898–1933), German photographer
- Ary Abramovich Sternfeld (1905–1980), Polish aerospace scientist
- Daniel Sternfeld (1905–1986), Belgian Composer
- Joel Sternfeld (born 1944), American photographer
- Nathan Sternfeld, author of Adventures With Rebbe Mendel
- Richard Sternfeld (1884–1943), German herpetologist

== See also ==
- Sternfeld (crater), a lunar impact crater
