= Ritch =

Given name

Ritch is a given name and a surname. Notable people with the name include:

Given name:

- Ritch Battersby, British musician, The Wildhearts
- Ritch Brinkley (1944–2015), American character actor
- Ritch Price, American baseball coach
- Ritch Savin-Williams (born 1949), American developmental psychologist
- Ritch Shydner (born 1952), American comedian, comic writer, and actor
- Ritch Winter (born 1957), ice hockey agent
- Ritch Workman (born 1973), American politician from Florida

Surname:

- David Ritch, (born 1951), Cayman Islands lawyer
- Michael Ritch (born 1973), American stock car racing driver
- Michael Ritch (soccer) (born 1981), American soccer player
- Shannon Ritch (born 1970), American mixed martial artist
- Steven Ritch (1921–1995), American actor
- Theodore Ritch (1894–1943), Russian tenor
- William G. Ritch, American politician from New Mexico and Wisconsin

Other:

- Big Dad Ritch, American singer, Texas Hippie Coalition

== See also ==
- Rich (disambiguation)
- Ritchey (disambiguation)
- Ritchie (disambiguation)
