= Schoenfield =

Schoenfield is a surname and may refer to:

- Dana Schoenfield (born 1953), American olympic swimmer
- Howard Schoenfield (1957–2020), American tennis player
- Paul Schoenfield, American classical composer

== See also ==
- Schoen Field, at Fort Harrison in Indiana, U.S.
- Schonfeld (disambiguation)
