= Jan Woltjer =

Jan Woltjer may refer to:

- Jan Woltjer (classical scholar)
- Jan Woltjer (astronomer)
