= Woltjer (crater) =

Crater on the Moon

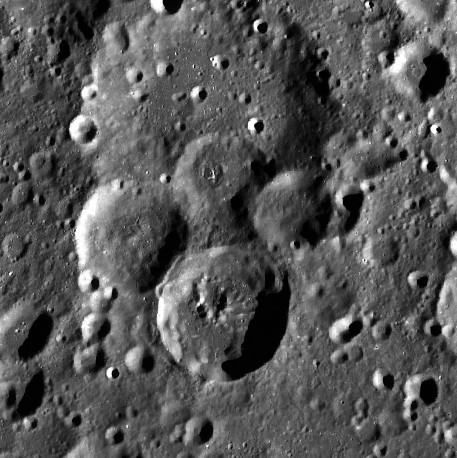
- LRO image, with Woltjer below center
- Coordinates: 44.87°N 159.83°W
- Diameter: 44.50 km (27.65 mi)
- Depth: Unknown
- Colongitude: 160° at sunrise
- Eponym: Jan Woltjer

Woltjer is an impact crater that is located in the northern latitudes of the Moon's far side. It is just attached to the southern outer rim of the larger crater Montgolfier. To the southwest is Schneller and to the east is Stoletov. It is named after astronomer Jan Woltjer.

This is a relatively recent impact compared to most of the craters on the far side, and the rim is still well-formed with little erosion. It is old enough, however, that its albedo matches its surroundings and it lacks a ray system. The inner wall has slumped in places and formed piles of talus along the south. The interior floor has two lines of low ridges that begin in the southeast and curve up to the northwestern inner wall. There is a level patch in the southern floor near the inner wall.

The crater was formally named by the IAU in 1970 after Dutch astronomer Jan Woltjer.

== Satellite craters ==
By convention these features are identified on lunar maps by placing the letter on the side of the crater midpoint that is closest to Woltjer.

| Woltjer | Latitude | Longitude | Diameter |
|---|---|---|---|
| P | 43.4° N | 161.5° W | 33 km |
| T | 45.1° N | 164.7° W | 15 km |
