= Schonfeld =

Schonfeld is a surname that may refer to

- Heinrich Schönfeld (born 1900), Austrian football player
- Julie Schonfeld (born 1965), American female rabbi
- Reese Schonfeld, Maurice "Reese" Schonfeld, American television journalist and co-founder of CNN and the Food Network
- Solomon Schonfeld (1912-1984), British rabbi
- Schonfeld Strategic Advisors, an American hedge fund

== See also ==
- Schönfeld (disambiguation)
- Sonnenfeld (disambiguation)
- Schoenfeld (disambiguation)
