= Blackett (disambiguation) =

Blackett is a surname of English derivation.

Blackett may also refer to:

- Blackett, New South Wales, Australia
- Blackett (crater), a lunar impact crater
- Blacket, Edinburgh a suburb in the south of Edinburgh, Scotland
