= Schönefeld (disambiguation) =

Schönefeld may refer to:

== Places in Germany ==
- Schönefeld, a municipality of Brandenburg near Berlin
- Leipzig-Schönefeld, a quarter of Leipzig, Saxony
- Schönefeld (Beelitz), a village in the town Beelitz, Brandenburg
- Schönefeld (Niedergörsdorf), a village in the municipality Niedergörsdorf, Brandenburg
- Schönefeld (Nuthe-Urstromtal), a village in the municipality Nuthe-Urstromtal, Brandenburg

== Transportation ==
- Berlin-Schönefeld Airport, one of Berlin's former main airports, expanded to became the Berlin Brandenburg Airport in 2020.
- Berlin Schönefeld Flughafen station, the railway station of the airport
- Autobahnkreuz Schönefeld, a German road interchange between the motorways A10, A13, A113

== See also ==
- Schönfeld (disambiguation)
