= Kulik (crater) =

Lunar impact crater

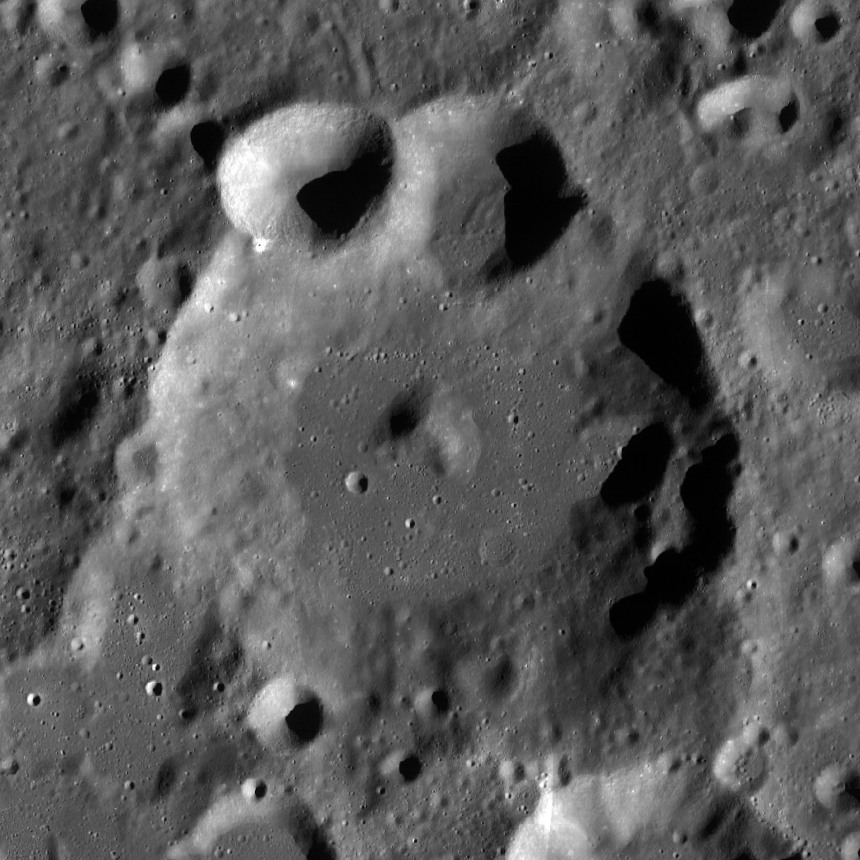
- LRO mosaic
- Coordinates: 41.98°N 154.63°W
- Diameter: 60.46 km (37.57 mi)
- Depth: Unknown
- Colongitude: 156° at sunrise
- Eponym: Leonid A. Kulik

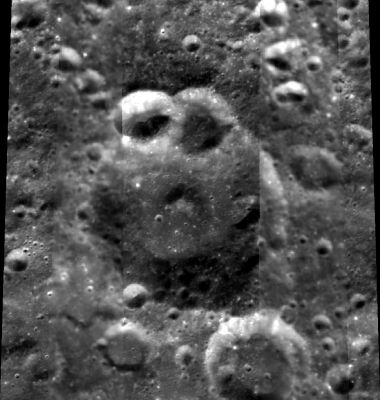
Clementine mosaic

Kulik is a lunar impact crater that lies on the northern hemisphere of the Moon's far side. The outer rim of this crater has been heavily impacted, particularly along the northern side which is almost entirely overlain by a pair of smaller craters. The southern inner wall is also marked by a cluster of small impacts, and there are small craters across the western rim and notching the eastern inner wall. The interior floor is nearly featureless, but a small central peak rises near the midpoint.

This crater lies about a crater diameter to the south of the crater Stoletov, and due west of the large Fowler. To the west is Schneller.

Prior to formal naming by the IAU in 1970, Kulik was called Crater 80.

== Satellite craters ==
By convention these features are identified on lunar maps by placing the letter on the side of the crater midpoint that is closest to Kulik.

Kulik	Latitude	Longitude	Diameter
J	40.6° N	151.4° W	46 km
K	39.1° N	151.6° W	42 km
L	40.8° N	153.5° W	33 km
