= Ritchey =

Ritchey may refer to:

== Places ==
- Ritchey, California
- Ritchey, Missouri

== People ==
- Claude Ritchey (1873–1951), American baseball player
- George Willis Ritchey (1864–1945), American optician, telescope maker and astronomer
- James Ritchey (born 1973), American football player
- Jimmy Ritchey, American songwriter and record producer
- Johnny Ritchey (1923–2003), American baseball player
- Michael Leonard Ritchey (born 1954), American pediatric urologist and academic researcher
- Timothy F. Ritchey (born 1951), American racehorse trainer
- Thomas Ritchey (1801–1863), American politician
- Tom Ritchey (born 1956), American bike designer

== Other uses ==
- Ritchey (lunar crater)
- Ritchey (Martian crater)
- Ritchey Design
