= Robert Anderson (mathematician) =

17th-century English mathematician

Robert Anderson (fl. 1668–1696), was an English mathematician and silk-weaver.

Anderson was from London. John Collins, one of the early members of the Royal Society, helped with the loan of books and the supply of scientific information. He devoted special attention to improving the art of gunnery, and during at least twenty-one years from 1671 conducted some thousands of experiments with cannon mounted at his own expense on Wimbledon Common, showing that his means must have been considerable. ‘I am very well assured,’ he says, ‘I have done more, being a private person, than all the engineers and gunners with their yearly salaries and allowances, since the first invention of this warlike engine.’

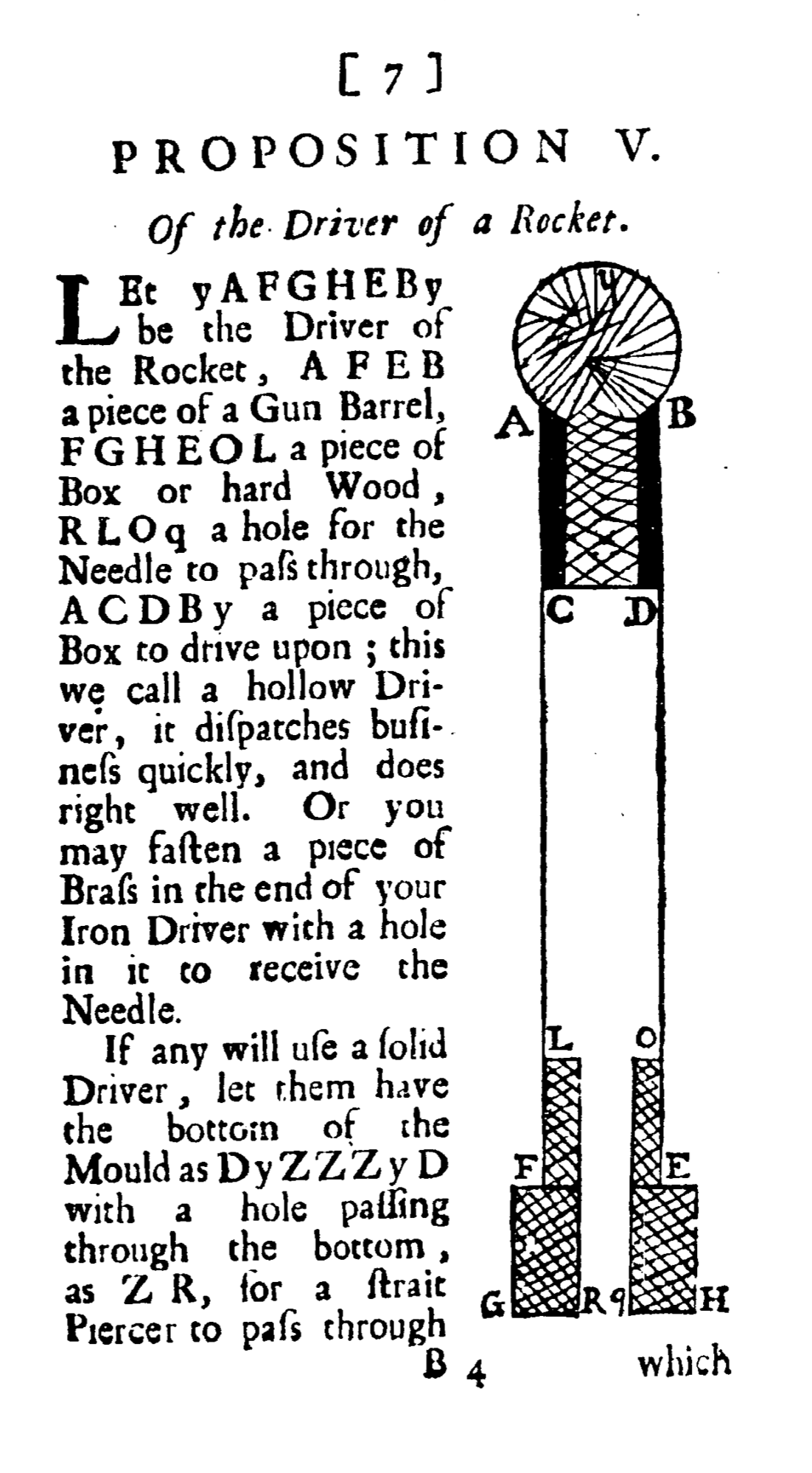
Robert Anderson suggests using metal for rocket casing

He wrote:

- ‘Stereometrical Propositions variously applicable, but particularly intended for Gageing,’ 1668, condemned by J. Gregory as ‘pitiful stuff’ (Correspondence of Scientific Men (Rigaud), ii. 258), but mentioned with approval in ‘Phil. Trans.’ iii. 785. An appendix entitled ‘Gaging Promoted’ followed in 1669 (noticed in Phil. Trans. iv. 960).
- ‘The Genuine Use and Effects of the Gunne, as well experimentally as mathematically demonstrated. A new Work of Singular Use unto Generals of Armies, Engineers, and other Artists. Tam Marte quam Mercurio. With Tables of Projection, etc. by Thomas Streete,’ 1674.
- ‘To hit a Mark, as well upon Ascents and Descents, as upon the Plain of the Horizon,’ 1690. A short Discourse is added ‘Of Granadoes, Carcasses, and Fireballs,’ with ‘Warlike Musick illustrated in several Consorts of Phrygian Flutes, clearly demonstrated by Principles of Musick and Mathematicks;’ the last a ponderous scientific joke.
- ‘To cut the Rigging, and Proposals for the Improvement of Great Artillery,’ 1691.
- ‘The Making of Rockets. In two Parts. The First containing the Making of Rockets for the meanest Capacity. The other to make Rockets by a Duplicate Proposition, to 1,000 pound Weight or higher,’ 1696. Dedicated to Henry, Earl of Romney, Master-General of the Ordnance, from whose favour the author hoped for a trial of his improvements in artillery practice. In this work Anderson suggests making rockets out of "a piece of a Gun Barrel" whose metal casing is much stronger than pasteboard or wood
- Watts (Bib. Brit.) mentions as the latest of his works a ‘Treatise on the Use and Effects of the Gunne,’ London, 1713, 4to.
