= Schoenfeld =

Schoenfeld may refer to:

== People ==
- Aaron Schoenfeld (born 1990), American-Israeli Major League Soccer player
- Adam Schoenfeld, American poker player
- Bernard C. Schoenfeld, American screenwriter
- Eleonore Schoenfeld, American cellist
- Gabriel Schoenfeld, American politician
- Gerald Schoenfeld (1924-2004), chairman of the Shubert Organization
- Jim Schoenfeld, Canadian ice hockey player
- Lowell Schoenfeld (1920-2002), American mathematician
- Otto Bruno Schoenfeld, athlete
- William N. Schoenfeld (1915-1996), American psychologist

== Other uses ==
- Schoenfeld, Saskatchewan, Canada
- Battle of Schoenfeld, a 1945 battle in Żeńsko in Pomerania, during World War II

== See also ==
- Schönfeld (disambiguation)
