= Teisserenc (crater) =

Crater on the Moon

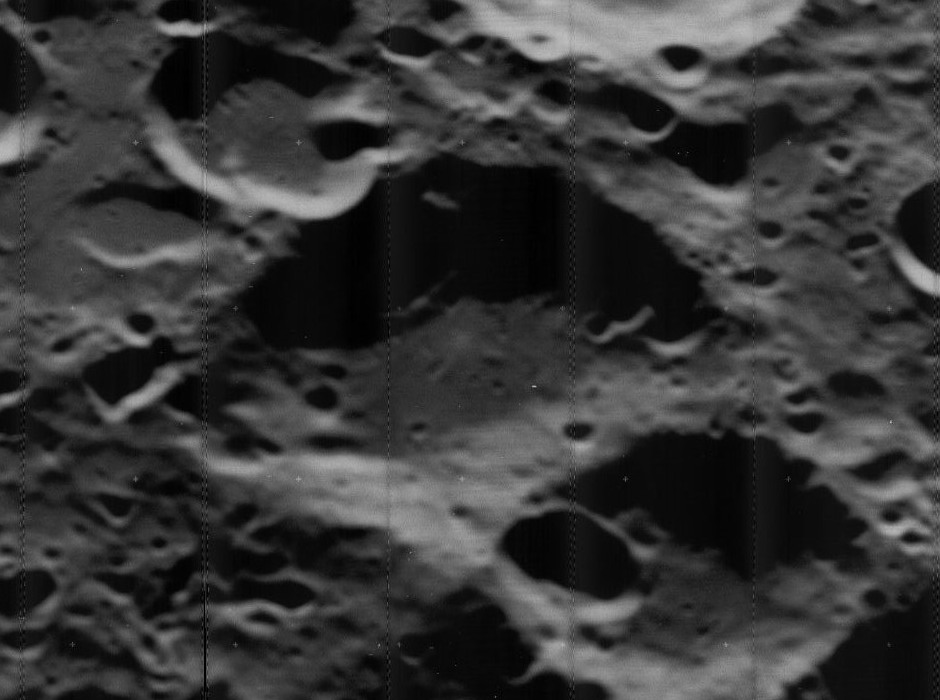
- Oblique Lunar Orbiter 5 image
- Coordinates: 32.2°N 135.9°W
- Diameter: 62 km
- Depth: Unknown
- Colongitude: 137° at sunrise
- Eponym: L. Teisserenc de Bort

Teisserenc is an eroded lunar impact crater on the Moon's far side. It lies just to the east of the crater Sanford, and southwest of Charlier. To the east of Charlier lies Kovalevskaya.

The outer rim of this crater has become eroded due to subsequent impacts. The satellite crater Teisserenc C intrudes into the rim edge to the northeast. The smaller Teisserenc Q is likewise protruding slightly into the southwestern rim. The remainder of the rim is somewhat uneven, especially at the southern end where it has been damaged by small impacts. There are a pair of small craterlets along the northern inner wall. In contrast the interior floor of Teisserenc is relatively level and featureless.

There is an unusual area of level ground to the south of Teisserenc, which stands in contrast with the battered terrain that surrounds the crater in the other directions.

== Satellite craters ==
By convention these features are identified on lunar maps by placing the letter on the side of the crater midpoint that is closest to Teisserenc.

Teisserenc	Latitude	Longitude	Diameter
C	33.1° N	134.7° W	47 km
P	30.1° N	137.1° W	25 km
Q	31.1° N	137.3° W	30 km
