= Montgolfier (crater) =

Crater on the Moon

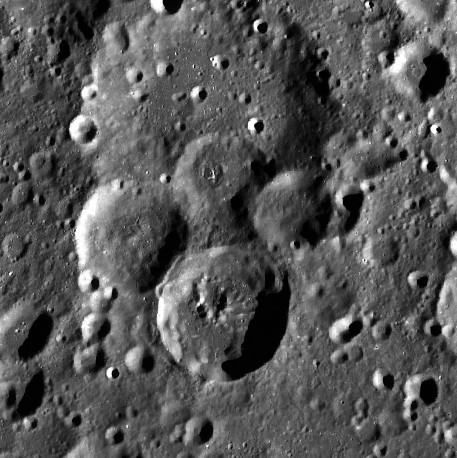
- LRO image, with Montgolfier at top, and Woltjer below center.
- Coordinates: 47.06°N 160.08°W
- Diameter: 83.71 km (52.01 mi)
- Depth: Unknown
- Colongitude: 161° at sunrise
- Eponym: Jacques E. Montgolfier; Joseph M. Montgolfier

Montgolfier is a worn lunar impact crater that is located in the northern hemisphere of the Moon's far side. To the east-northeast is the crater Paraskevopoulos, and southwest of Montgolfier lies Schneller.

The entire southern rim of this crater has been overlain by a cluster of four smaller craters, including Montgolfier P and J, and Woltjer. Montgolfier P and the unnamed crater to its northeast have linear fractures in their floors. The remaining rim of Montgolfier has been worn by smaller impacts, leaving a somewhat uneven perimeter that is overlain by some small craters. The interior floor is pitted and lacks a central peak.

Prior to formal naming by the IAU in 1970, Montgolfier was called Crater 78.

== Satellite craters ==
By convention these features are identified on lunar maps by placing the letter on the side of the crater midpoint that is closest to Montgolfier.

Montgolfier	Latitude	Longitude	Diameter
J	46.4° N	158.2° W	28 km
P	46.1° N	160.9° W	36 km
W	49.3° N	164.4° W	37 km
Y	50.5° N	161.3° W	40 km
