= Charles Edward St. John =

American astronomer

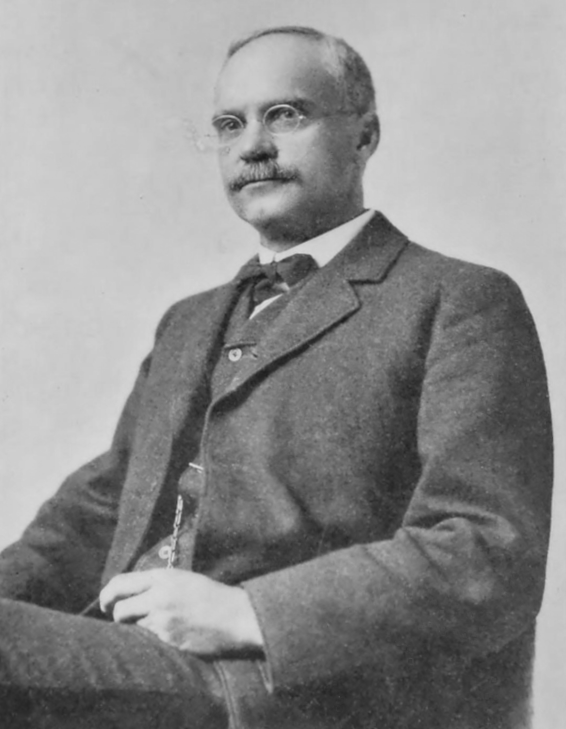

Charles St. John, third from left, at the Fourth Conference International Union for Cooperation in Solar Research at Mount Wilson Observatory

Charles Edward St. John (March 15, 1857 – April 26, 1935) was an American astronomer.

He was born in Allen, Michigan to Hiriam A. St. John and his wife Lois Bacon; the youngest of a family of four sons and two daughters. In 1873 he entered Michigan Normal College, then graduated at the age of 19. For the next ten years, he suffered from ill health. After recovering, he became a teacher at the college, and in 1887 he graduated with a B.S. from Michigan State Agricultural College. He performed two years of graduate study in electromagnetism at the University of Michigan, then earned an M.A. from Harvard University in 1893. He was awarded a John Tyndall Fellowship and studied for a year in Berlin before returning to earn his Ph.D. from Harvard in 1896.

After teaching for a year at the University of Michigan, he became an associate professor of physics at Oberlin College. He made professor in 1899 and became Dean of the College of Arts and Science in 1907. In May 1908 at the age of 51 he joined the staff at Mount Wilson Observatory. There he studied the Sun, observing sun spots, the structure of the solar atmosphere, examined the Sun's element composition using spectroscopy, and so forth. In his later work, he spent much time working to confirm the theory of general relativity. He also made observations of the planet Venus, showing that there was insufficient oxygen in the atmosphere to support life (as we know it). Between 1909 and 1930 he published 80 papers. He was elected to the United States National Academy of Sciences in 1924 and the American Philosophical Society in 1928. He also served as President of Commission 12 of the International Astronomical Union until 1932.

The crater St. John on the far side of the Moon is named after him.
