= St. John (crater) =

Crater on the Moon

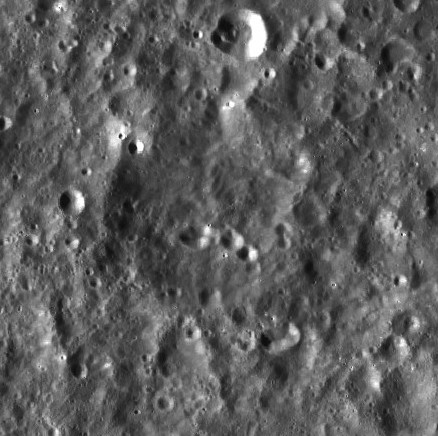
- Lunar Reconnaissance Orbiter image.
- Coordinates: 10.2°N 150.2°E
- Diameter: 68 km
- Depth: Unknown
- Colongitude: 187° at sunrise
- Eponym: Charles E. St. John

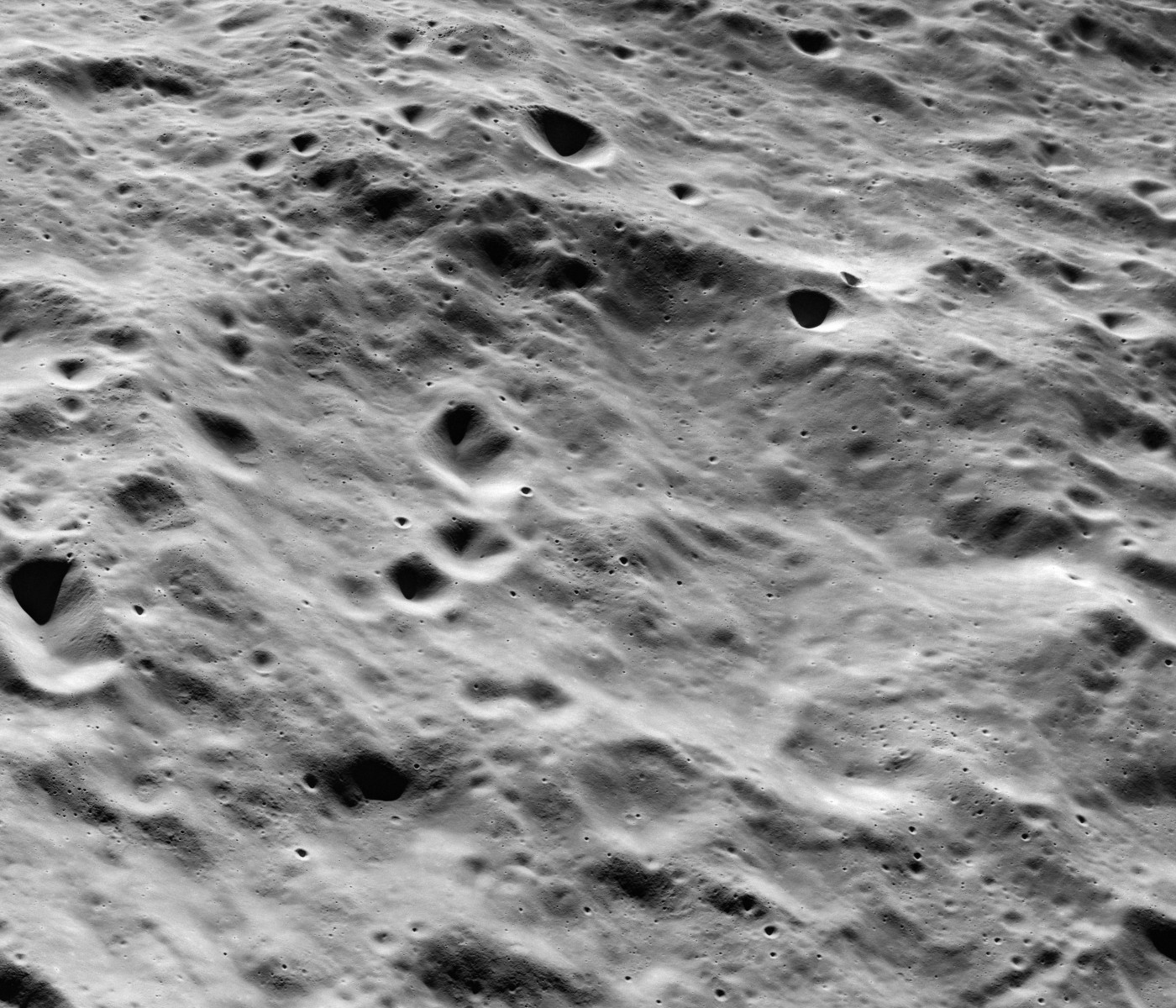
Apollo 16 image

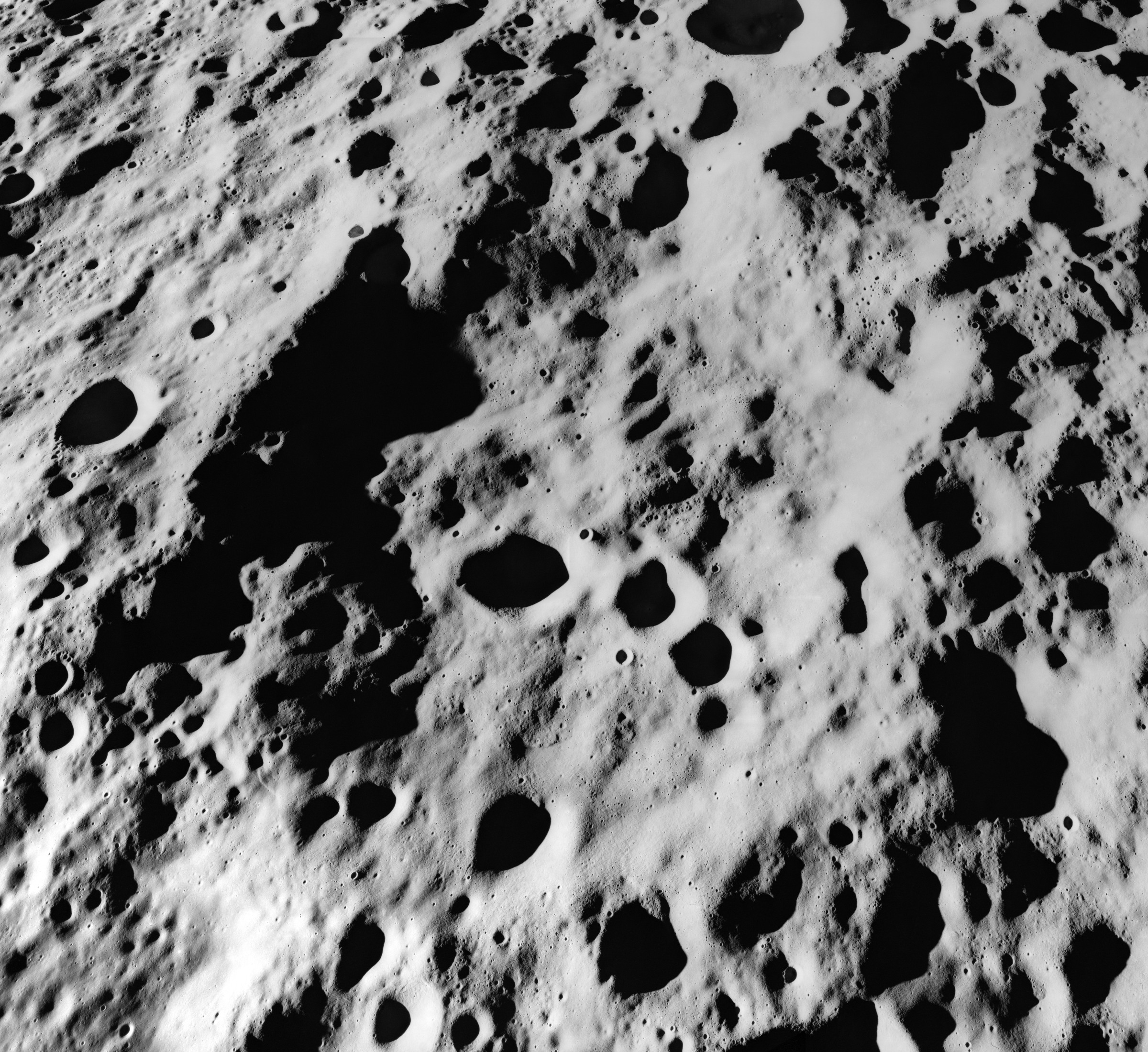
Apollo 16 image with lower sun angle

St. John is a badly degraded lunar impact crater on the Moon's far side. This crater is situated to the northeast of a huge walled plain named Mendeleev, and southwest of the crater Kohlschütter. To the east of St. John is the small crater Mills.

This is a heavily worn and eroded crater formation that is now little more than an uneven depression in the surface. It is scarcely distinguishable from the surrounding terrain, except from the shadows cast by the outer rim. The interior floor is uneven and marked by a chain of three small craterlets near the midpoint.

The crater is named after Charles Edward St. John, an American astronomer.

== Satellite craters ==
By convention these features are identified on lunar maps by placing the letter on the side of the crater midpoint that is closest to St. John.

St. John	Latitude	Longitude	Diameter
A	12.4° N	150.5° E	16 km
M	7.5° N	150.1° E	16 km
W	12.6° N	147.0° E	18 km
X	13.9° N	147.4° E	30 km
Y	13.8° N	149.0° E	21 km
