= Michael Leonard Ritchey =

American urologist and medical researcher (born 1954)

Michael Leonard Ritchey (born December 27, 1954) is an American pediatric urologist and academic researcher known for his contributions to the treatment of Wilms' tumor. He previously served as Chief Medical Officer at Phoenix Children’s Hospital.

== Early life and education ==
Ritchey completed his undergraduate degree at the University of Southwestern Louisiana in 1975 and earned his M.D. from Louisiana State University School of Medicine in 1979. He completed his residency at Wilford Hall USAF Medical Center and a fellowship in pediatric urology at the Mayo Clinic.

== Career ==
He began his career in the United States Air Force, receiving the Meritorious Service Medal for his contributions. He later held academic positions at the University of Michigan and the University of Texas Medical School, where he directed the Division of Urology. Since 2011, Ritchey has been affiliated with Phoenix Children’s Hospital, becoming Chief Medical Officer in 2018.

He was a contributor to the National Wilms Tumor Study Group and played a key role in modern treatment protocols for this pediatric kidney cancer. His contributions extend to clinical guidelines that have improved outcomes for children globally. His work includes over 200 peer-reviewed publications, book chapters, and editorials.

== Research and publications ==
Ritchey has contributed to pediatric oncology research, including work with the National Wilms Tumor Study Group. His publications focus on nephroblastoma, pediatric urology, and long-term outcomes of childhood cancer treatments. He has served on editorial boards, including the Journal of Urology.
