= Harlan True Stetson =

American astronomer and physicist

- Born: 28 June 1885
- Died: 14 October 1964 (aged 79)
- Education: Brown University, Dartmouth College, Harvard University
- Occupations: astronomer and physicist
- Known for: taught at Dartmouth and Harvard
- Notable work: studied sunspots, the Earth's crust, and the propagation of radio waves

Harlan True Stetson FRAS (28 June 1885–14 October 1964) was an American astronomer and physicist.

He earned a B.S. from Brown University in 1912, a M.A. from Dartmouth College, then a Ph.D. at Harvard University in 1915. His thesis was titled, On an Apparatus and Method for Thermo-Electric Measurements for Photographic Photometry.

Stetson joined Dartmouth in 1918 to teach physics, then moved to Harvard where he taught astronomy until 1929. He then became the director of the Perkins Observatory in Delaware, Ohio. Stetson is an honorary member of Sigma Pi Sigma.

In 1936 he joined the Massachusetts Institute of Technology. He directed the MIT Cosmic Terrestrial Research Laboratory from 1940 until 1950, and performed research into the relationship between the cosmos and the Earth. His studies included sunspots, the Earth's crust, and the propagation of radio waves.

The crater Stetson on the Moon is named in his honor.

== Bibliography ==
- "A Manual of Laboratory Astronomy", 1923, Eastern Science Supply Company.
- "Man and the Stars", 1930
- "Earth, Radio and the Stars", 1934.
- "Sunspots and their effects", 1937.
- "Sunspots in Action", 1947, The Ronald Press Company, New York.

He is also the author of multiple articles on astronomy.
