= Sasserides (crater) =

Lunar impact crater

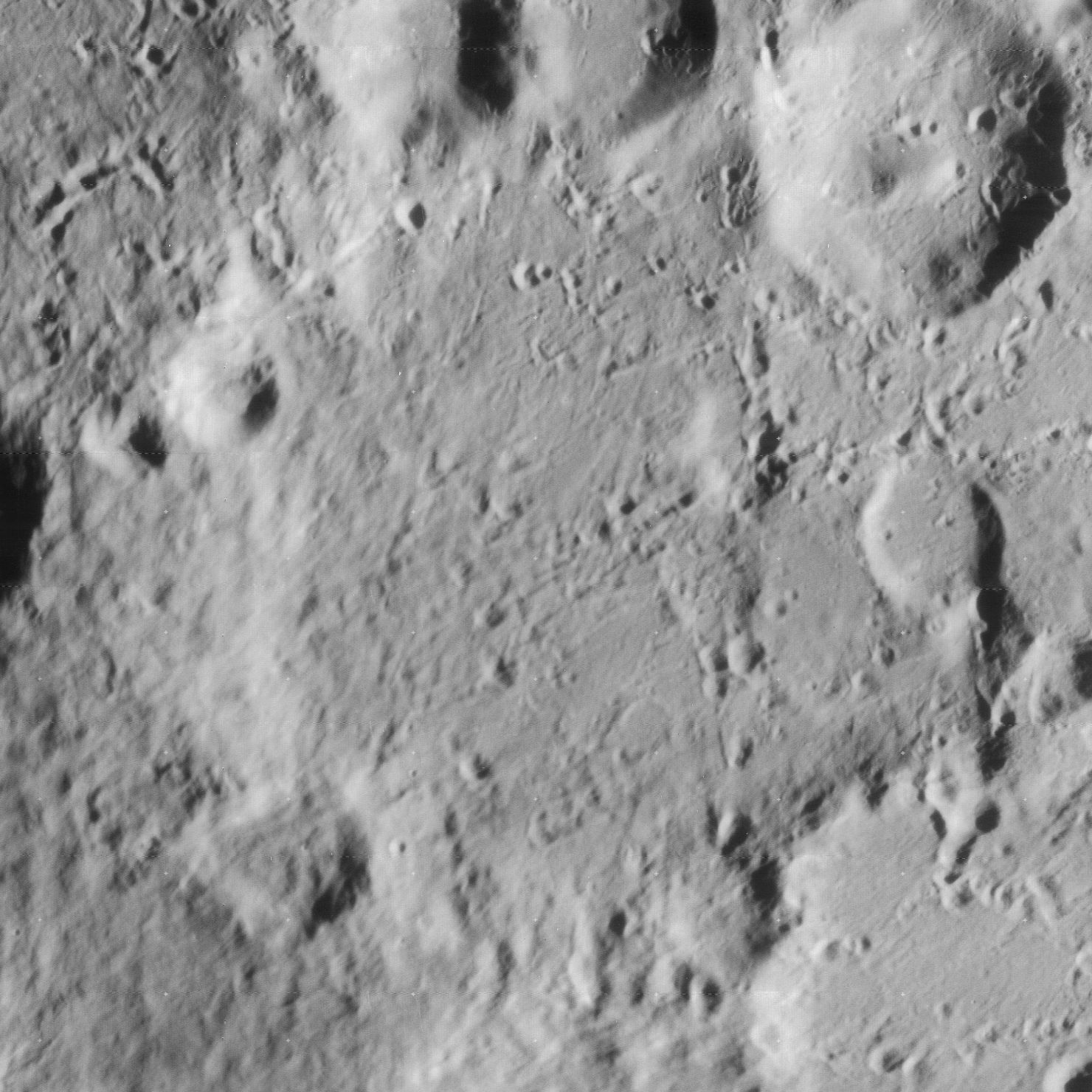
- Lunar Orbiter 4 image
- Coordinates: 39.1°S 9.3°W
- Diameter: 90 km
- Depth: 1.8 km
- Colongitude: 9° at sunrise
- Eponym: Gellio Sasceride

Sasserides is the remains of a lunar impact crater in the southern part of the Moon. It was named after Danish astronomer Gellio Sasceride. It is located less than one crater diameter to the north of the prominent crater Tycho, and west of Orontius. To the north is Ball.

This formation has been so battered and ruined by impacts that it is scarcely recognizable as a crater. Only a short section of the rim along the southwest side survives, with the remainder overlaid or modified by impacts of various dimensions. The most notable of these are an arc of craters along the northern rim consisting of Sasserides P, G, and C. This last crater has a low central peak at its midpoint. The interior floor is somewhat more even than the surrounding rim, although it has a short chain of worn craters in the eastern half.

== Satellite craters ==
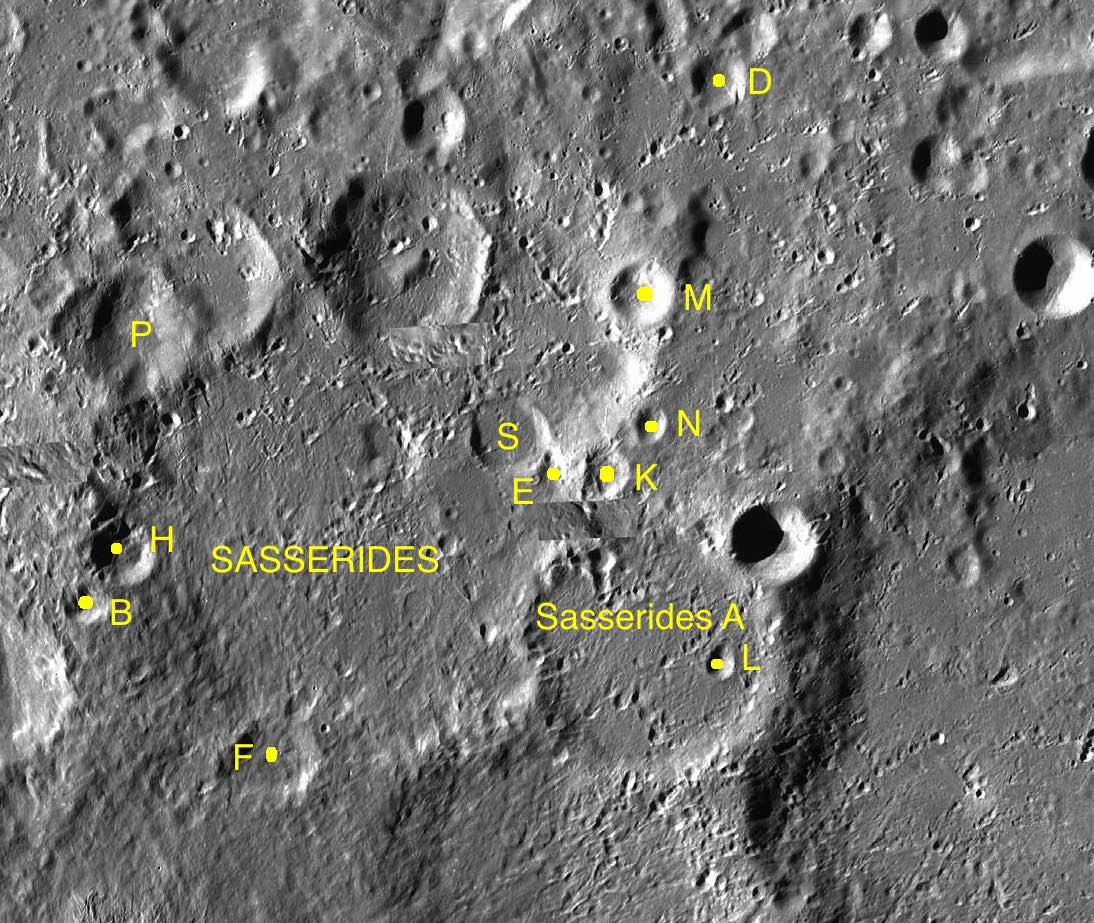
Sasserides and its satellite craters

By convention these features are identified on lunar maps by placing the letter on the side of the crater midpoint that is closest to Sasserides.

Sasserides	Latitude	Longitude	Diameter
A	39.9° S	7.0° W	48 km
B	39.5° S	11.2° W	9 km
D	36.7° S	6.5° W	11 km
E	38.9° S	7.7° W	8 km
F	40.5° S	9.9° W	16 km
H	39.2° S	10.9° W	12 km
K	39.0° S	7.4° W	8 km
L	40.0° S	6.6° W	5 km
M	37.9° S	7.1° W	11 km
N	38.7° S	7.0° W	7 km
P	38.0° S	10.7° W	21 km
S	38.7° S	8.0° W	15 km
