= Schwabe (crater) =

Crater on the Moon

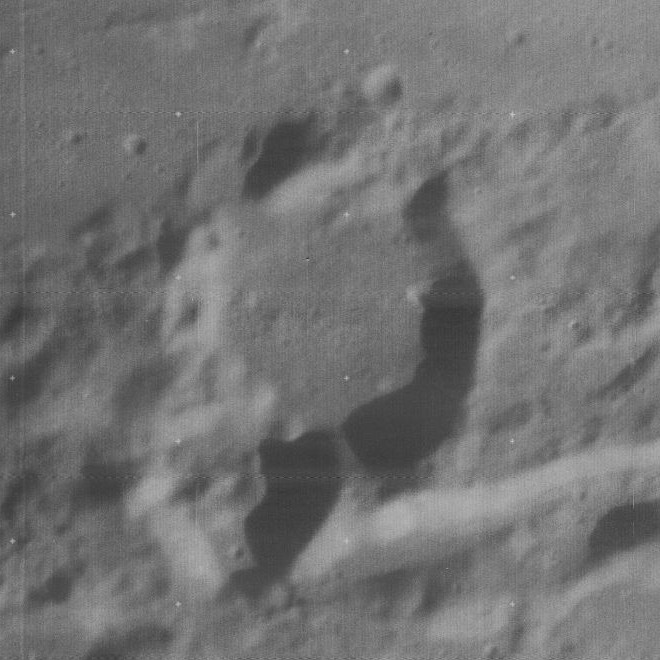
- Lunar Orbiter 4 image
- Coordinates: 65.1°N 45.6°E
- Diameter: 25 km
- Depth: 1.7 km
- Colongitude: 315° at sunrise
- Eponym: Heinrich Schwabe

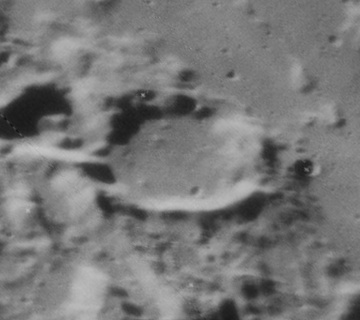
Oblique view from Lunar Orbiter 4

Schwabe is a small lunar impact crater that is located in the northern part of the Moon. It lies to the southeast of the much larger crater Arnold, and east-northeast of Democritus.

The rim of this crater is cut through by a cleft along the northwest that runs westwards until it joins the lava-flooded terrain surrounding Schwabe G. To the south of Schwabe is a cleft-like feature that runs from the rim of Schwabe D a distance of nearly 100 km eastwards.

The remaining rim of Schwabe crater is worn and uneven, with the most intact section along the east-southeast side. The interior floor has been resurfaced by basaltic lava, possibly entering the crater through the aforementioned gaps in the rim. The surface is level and featureless, with an albedo that matches the surrounding terrain.

== Satellite craters ==
By convention these features are identified on lunar maps by placing the letter on the side of the crater midpoint that is closest to Schwabe.

| Schwabe | Latitude | Longitude | Diameter |
|---|---|---|---|
| C | 67.8° N | 46.9° E | 29 km |
| D | 64.5° N | 44.6° E | 17 km |
| E | 64.0° N | 43.4° E | 19 km |
| F | 66.4° N | 50.0° E | 20 km |
| G | 65.5° N | 42.2° E | 15 km |
| K | 67.5° N | 48.8° E | 9 km |
| U | 66.5° N | 57.1° E | 17 km |
| W | 69.6° N | 52.2° E | 9 km |
| X | 68.3° N | 56.6° E | 8 km |
