= Stetson (crater) =

Crater on the Moon

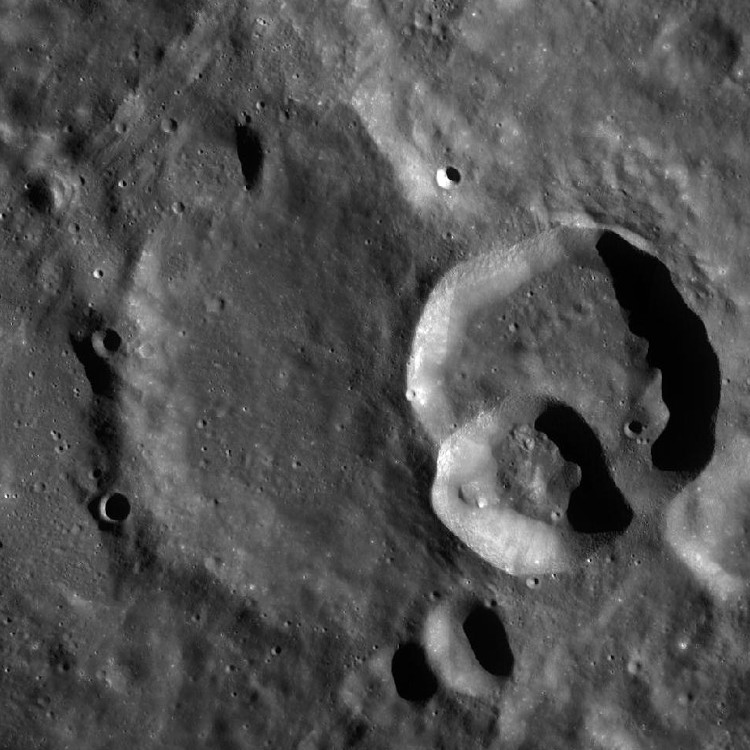
- LRO WAC image of Stetson at left, with Stetson E and G at right
- Coordinates: 39.6°S 118.3°W
- Diameter: 64 km
- Depth: Unknown
- Colongitude: 120° at sunrise
- Eponym: Harlan T. Stetson

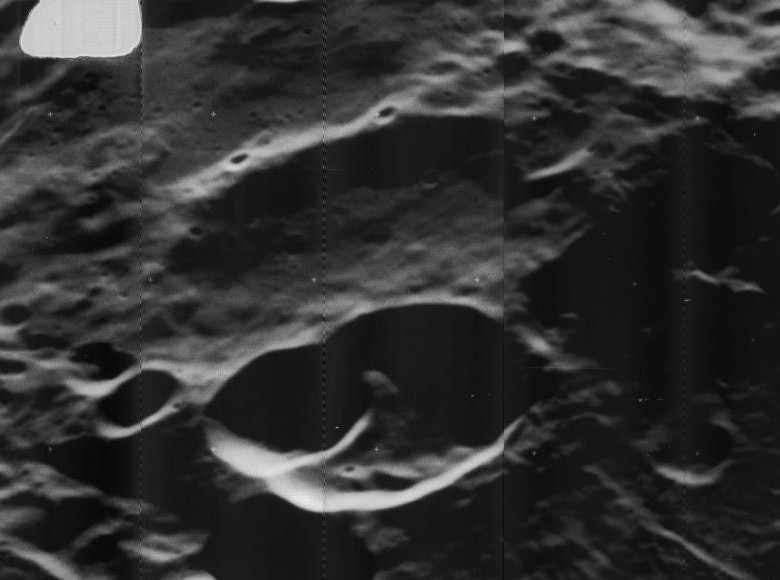
Oblique Lunar Orbiter 5 image facing west with Stetson at center and Stetson E and G below center

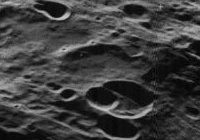
Another Lunar Orbiter 5 image

Stetson is the remains of a crater on the far side of the Moon. The northeastern part of the rim of Stetson has been overlain by the larger crater Blackett. Lying across the eastern rim is a double-crater formation consisting of the satellites Stetson E and Stetson G. There are also small craters along the southeast and northwestern rims.

Only the portion of the rim that is still relatively intact is from the west-northwest counter-clockwise to the south. The surviving rim and the remaining interior floor are relatively indistinct, possibly due to deposits of ejecta from the Mare Orientale impact basin to the northeast. Radial streaks of ejecta and secondary craters cover the terrain that surrounds Stetson and Blackett.

== Satellite craters ==
By convention these features are identified on lunar maps by placing the letter on the side of the crater midpoint that is closest to Stetson.

Stetson	Latitude	Longitude	Diameter
E	39.4° S	117.0° W	38 km
G	39.9° S	117.2° W	23 km
N	43.2° S	120.2° W	18 km
P	41.8° S	119.8° W	24 km
