= Ramsay (crater) =

Crater on the Moon

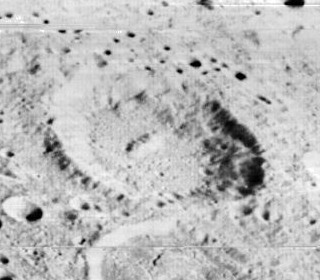
- Oblique Lunar Orbiter 2 view, facing south
- Coordinates: 40.2°S 144.5°E
- Diameter: 81 km
- Depth: Unknown
- Colongitude: 216° at sunrise
- Formation: Nectarian
- Eponym: William Ramsay

Ramsay is a lunar impact crater that is located on the Moon's far side. It lies to the south-southwest of the larger crater Jules Verne, and is nearly in contact with the satellite crater Jules Verne P along the northern outer rim. To the southeast of Ramsay is the crater Koch, and to the west-southwest lies the overlapping pair of Roche and Pauli.

On the lunar geologic timescale, Ramsay dates to the Nectarian period. This is a worn crater, although the rim retains a generally circular character and is marked only by tiny craterlets (except for a notch in the south-southeast). The interior floor is relatively featureless, with a low central rise near the midpoint.

== Satellite craters ==
By convention these features are identified on lunar maps by placing the letter on the side of the crater midpoint that is closest to Ramsay.

Ramsay	Latitude	Longitude	Diameter
U	40.0° S	142.4° E	23 km
