= Stoletov (crater) =

Crater on the Moon

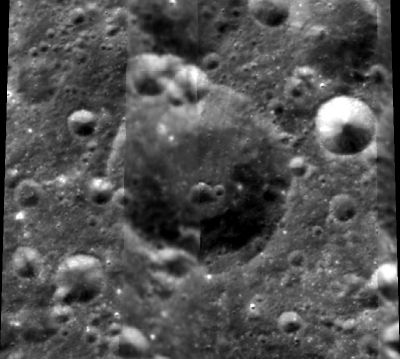
- Clementine mosaic
- Coordinates: 44.82°N 155.50°W
- Diameter: 42.43 km (26.36 mi)
- Depth: Unknown
- Colongitude: 156° at sunrise
- Eponym: Aleksandr G. Stoletov

Stoletov is a lunar impact crater on the far side of the Moon. It is located in the northern hemisphere, less than one crater diameter to the north of Kulik. To the northwest of Stoletov is Montgolfier.

This is a worn and eroded crater formation. There is a merged cluster of small impacts along the northern rim and small craterlets across the southern and western rims. The inner walls and interior floor are relatively featureless. There is a small craterlet on the floor to the south of the midpoint.

The crater was formally named by the IAU in 1970 after Russian physicist Aleksandr G. Stoletov.

== Satellite craters ==
By convention these features are identified on lunar maps by placing the letter on the side of the crater midpoint that is closest to Stoletov.

Stoletov	Latitude	Longitude	Diameter
C	46.3° N	153.6° W	36 km
Y	46.5° N	155.6° W	22 km
