= Jan Woltjer (astronomer) =

Dutch astronomer (1891-1946)

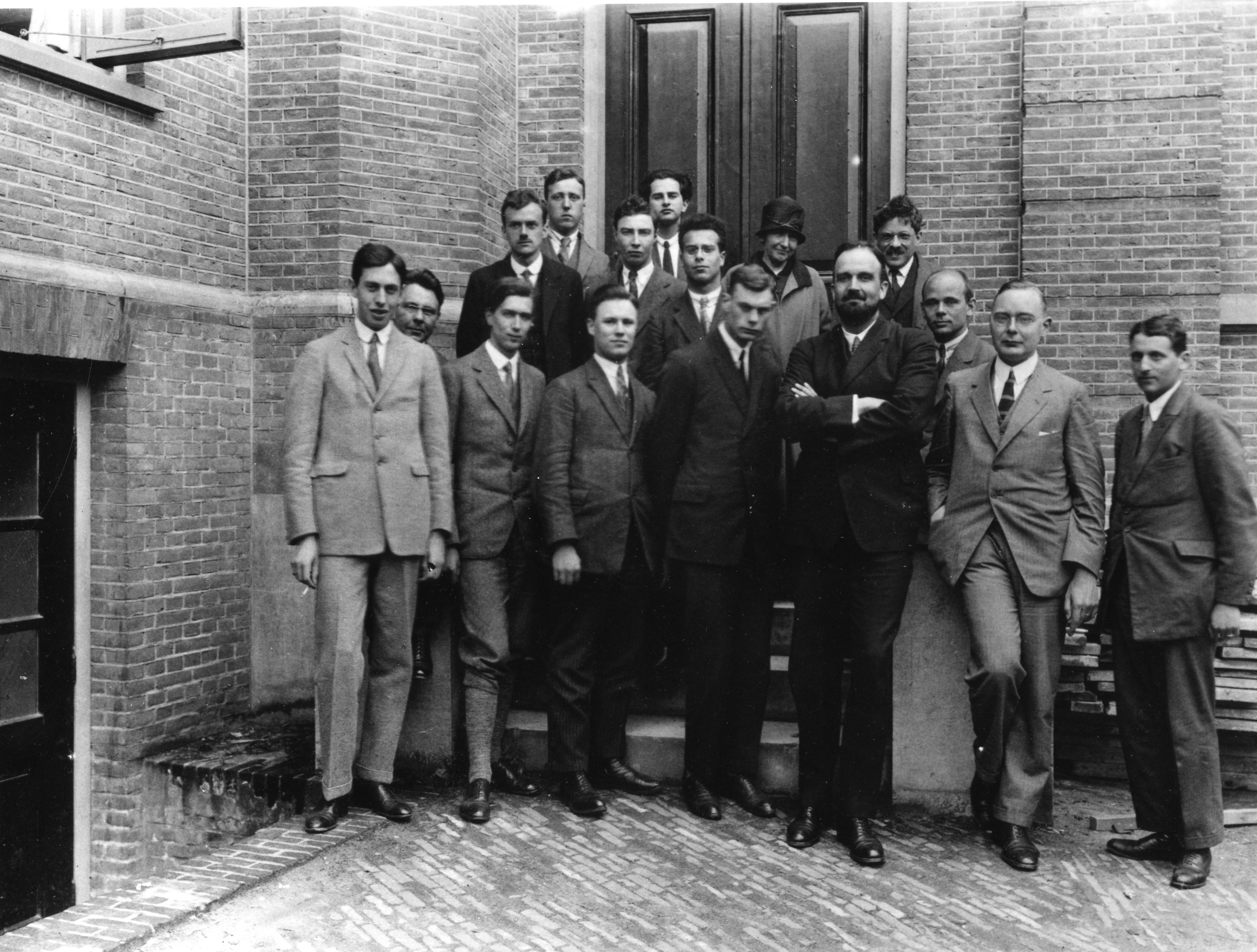
Jan Woltjer (third from right) in 1926

Jan Woltjer (3 August 1891, Amsterdam – 28 January 1946, Leiden) was a Dutch astronomer.

Woltjer was the son of the classical scholar Jan Woltjer. On 13 December 1916 he married Hillegonda de Vries in Groningen. He worked and taught at Leiden University, where Gerard P. Kuiper was one of his students. He was the father of the astronomer Lodewijk Woltjer (1930–2019), who was the director general of the European Southern Observatory from 1975 to 1987.

The crater Woltjer on the Moon and the asteroid 1795 Woltjer are both named after him.
