= Thomas Street (astronomer) =

17th-century English astronomer

- Born: 5 March 1621 (probably unadjusted); Castlelyons, Kingdom of Ireland
- Died: 17 August 1689 (probably unadjusted) (aged 68); Westminster, London, Kingdom of England
- Known for: Astronomia Carolina
- Scientific career
- Fields: Astronomy

Thomas Street (also spelled Streete) (1621–1689) was an English astronomer, known for his writings on celestial motions. He has sometimes been confused with Thomas Street the judge, who lived from 1626 to 1696. The crater Street on the Moon is named after him.

== Life ==
According to Brief Lives by Street's contemporary John Aubrey, Street was born at Castle Lyons in Ireland on 5 March 1621, and died "in Chanon-row (vulgarly Channel-rowe) at Westminster, 17 August 1689, and is buried in the church yard of the new chapell there".

== Astronomy ==
On 3 May 1661 Streete observed a transit of Mercury from Long Acre in London with Nicholas Mercator and Christiaan Huygens. Streete subsequently disputed Hevelius's observation of this event. The same year also saw Streete publishing Astronomia Carolina, a new theorie of Coelestial Motions. An Appendix to Astronomia Carolina (including tables) followed in 1664. Astronomia Carolina was widely read, and used by students who later became very notable in their own right, e.g. Isaac Newton and John Flamsteed. It was from Astronomia Carolina that Flamsteed learned how to calculate eclipses and planetary positions. Street's tables in Astronomia Carolina had a reputation for accuracy: for example, Flamsteed once referred to them as "the exactest tables in being, the Caroline", and Astronomia Carolina itself appeared in second and third editions as late as 1710 and 1716.

1674 saw the appearance of Street's Description and Use of the Planetary Systeme together with Easie Tables, as well as, in the same year, Tables of Projection for artillery, accompanying a work on gunnery by Robert Anderson.

A follower of Johannes Kepler, Street argued, like Kepler, that Earth's velocity in its annual revolution around the sun is not uniform. He argued that the velocity increases as it approaches the Sun, and decreases as it moves away.

== Other achievements ==
Street invented an improved back-staff, a modification of an earlier instrument by Robert Hooke, adding to the device two planes and a small mirror.

== Personality ==
He was of a rough and cholerique disposition. Discoursing with Prince Rupert, his highnesse affirmed something that was not according to art; sayd Mr. Street, 'whoever affirmes that is no mathematician.' So they would point at him afterwards at court and say, 'There's the man that huff't prince Rupert.'" ... "He hath left with his widowe (who lives in Warwick lane ...) an absolute piece of Trigonometrie, plain and spherical, in MS., more perfect than ever was yet donne, and more clear and demonstrated." ... "He was one of Mr. Ashmole's clarkes in the Excise office, which was his chiefest lively-hood.

— John Aubrey, Brief Lives

One of Street's pamphlets described how he engaged in a vigorous polemic with Vincent Wing, his astronomical competitor, who had published a criticism of Street's Astronomia Carolina.

Edmond Halley (1656–1742), Street's much younger contemporary, wrote of Street as his 'good friend' (according to Halley's biographer), and said that they had observed a lunar eclipse together. Halley wrote an appendix to the 1710 edition of Street's Astronomia Carolina, and Cajori (op. cit.) said that Halley actually 'brought out' that 1710 edition.
