= Sanford (crater) =

Crater on the Moon

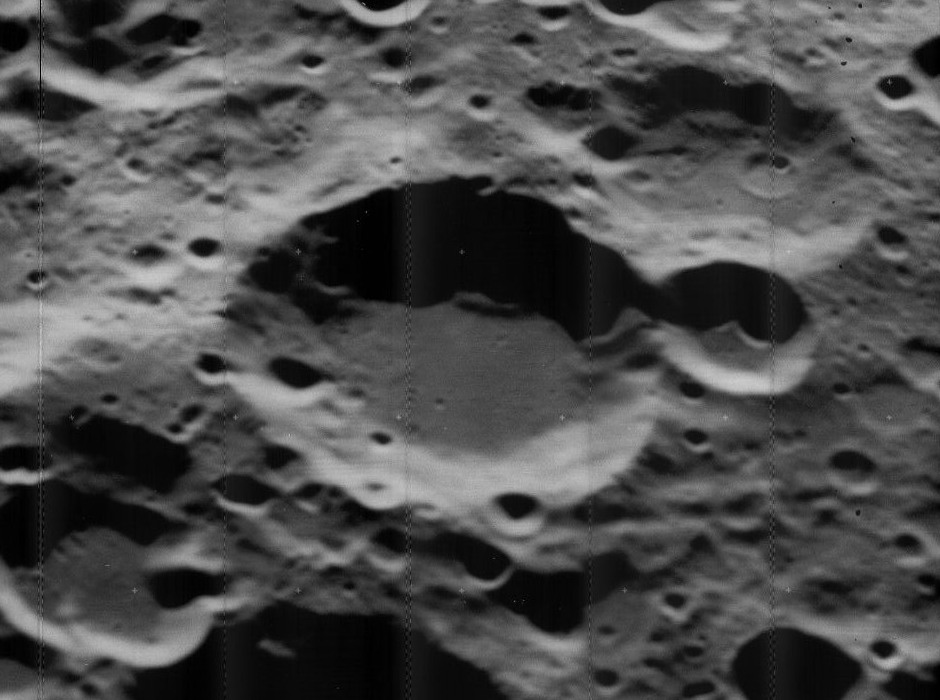
- Oblique Lunar Orbiter 5 image
- Coordinates: 32.6°N 138.9°W
- Diameter: 55 km
- Depth: Unknown
- Colongitude: 140° at sunrise
- Eponym: Roscoe F. Sanford

Sanford is a lunar impact crater that is located in the northern latitudes on the Moon's far side. It lies to the south-southeast of the crater Klute, and just to the west-northwest of Teisserenc. To the southwest lies Joule.

This is a circular crater formation with a worn outer rim. A pair of small craterlets lies along the eastern rim, and the satellite crater Sanford C is attached to the outer edge along the north-northwest. Attached to the southern exterior is what may be the remains of a larger, unnamed crater that is now considerably eroded.

== Satellite craters ==
By convention these features are identified on lunar maps by placing the letter on the side of the crater midpoint that is closest to Sanford.

Sanford	Latitude	Longitude	Diameter
C	34.1° N	137.0° W	18 km
T	32.7° N	143.3° W	43 km
W	33.7° N	140.2° W	38 km
Y	33.7° N	139.2° W	22 km
