= Adam Schoenfeld =

American poker player

World Series of Poker
- Bracelet: None
- Money finishes: 3
- Highest WSOP Main Event finish: 367th, 2010

World Poker Tour
- Title: None
- Final table: 1
- Money finishes: 3

Adam Schoenfeld is an American professional poker player and former columnist for Card Player magazine. Schoenfeld decided to quit his job as the vice president of an Internet analysis firm, Jupiter Communications, in order to play poker full-time.

In the 2004 World Series of Poker (WSOP), Schoenfeld played in ten events but did not make any money. That same year, he made the top 15 in World Poker Tour events three times, making one final table.

Though featured on ESPN's coverage of the 2006 WSOP Main Event, he did not cash. For the 2007 WSOP, Schoenfeld again played in select tournaments, but once again failed to cash. He co-hosted a series of shows entitled The Scoop for Card Player's online television network during the 2007 events. As of 2010, his total live tournament winnings exceed $430,000.

Schoenfeld is the ex-boyfriend of Evelyn Ng. She mentions him as one of the poker players she respects most.
