= Street (crater) =

Crater on the Moon

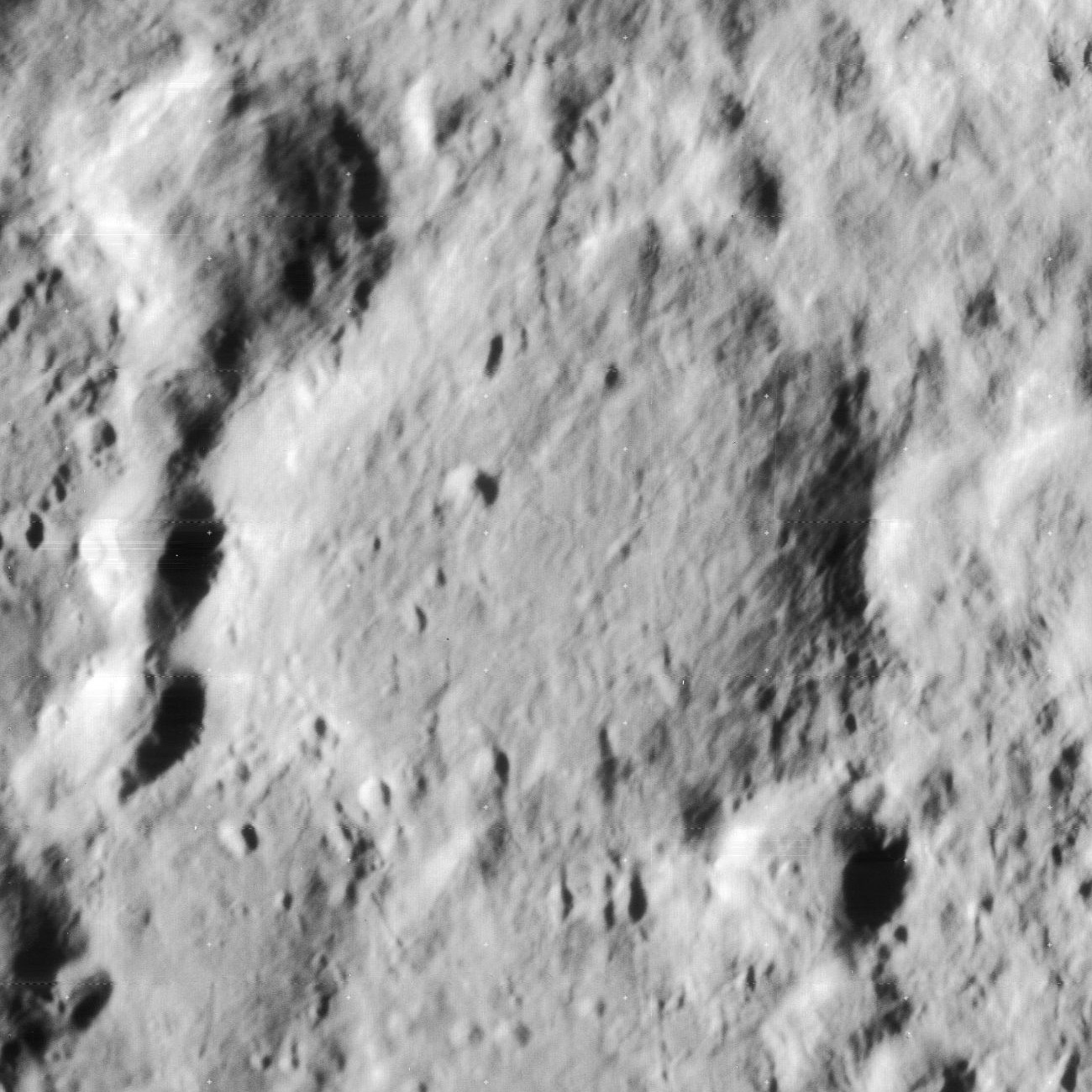
- Lunar Orbiter 4 image
- Coordinates: 46.5°S 10.5°W
- Diameter: 58 km (36 mi)
- Depth: 1.5 km (0.93 mi)
- Colongitude: 11° at sunrise
- Eponym: Thomas Street

Street is a lunar impact crater located just to the south of the prominent ray crater Tycho. Street lies within the skirt of high-albedo ejecta from Tycho, and it is more heavily worn than its younger and larger neighbor. There are several smaller craters joined to the western rim, as well as two craters along the eastern rim. The floor is relatively smooth and flat, except for a small craterlet in the western half. The crater is 58 kilometres (36 mi) in diameter and 1,500 metres (4,900 ft) in depth. It may be from the Pre-Imbrian period, which lasted from 4.55 to 3.85 billion years ago. It is named for the 17th-century English astronomer Thomas Street.

== Satellite craters ==
By convention these features are identified on lunar maps by placing the letter on the side of the crater midpoint that is closest to Street.

| Street | Latitude | Longitude | Diameter | |
| Street | Latitude | Longitude | km | mi |
|---|---|---|---|---|
| A | 47.0° S | 9.0° W | 17 | 10.6 |
| B | 47.1° S | 12.1° W | 14 | 8.7 |
| C | 48.3° S | 15.4° W | 15 | 9.3 |
| D | 48.9° S | 12.6° W | 11 | 6.8 |
| E | 47.5° S | 11.8° W | 12 | 7.5 |
| F | 48.3° S | 16.6° W | 8 | 5.0 |
| G | 46.6° S | 15.0° W | 11 | 6.8 |
| H | 48.3° S | 12.2° W | 29 | 18.0 |
| J | 48.7° S | 13.7° W | 7 | 4.3 |
| K | 47.6° S | 13.1° W | 9 | 5.6 |
| L | 50.7° S | 13.5° W | 8 | 5.0 |
| M | 47.7° S | 14.6° W | 49 | 30.4 |
| N | 48.1° S | 10.4° W | 5 | 3.1 |
| P | 45.7° S | 11.9° W | 6 | 3.7 |
| R | 49.1° S | 14.5° W | 5 | 3.1 |
| S | 49.0° S | 14.7° W | 4 | 2.5 |
| T | 49.2° S | 15.1° W | 9 | 5.6 |
