= Sabatier (crater) =

Crater on the Moon

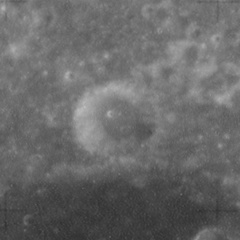
- Apollo 17 Mapping Camera image
- Coordinates: 13.2°N 79.0°E
- Diameter: 10 km
- Depth: Unknown
- Colongitude: 281° at sunrise
- Eponym: Paul Sabatier

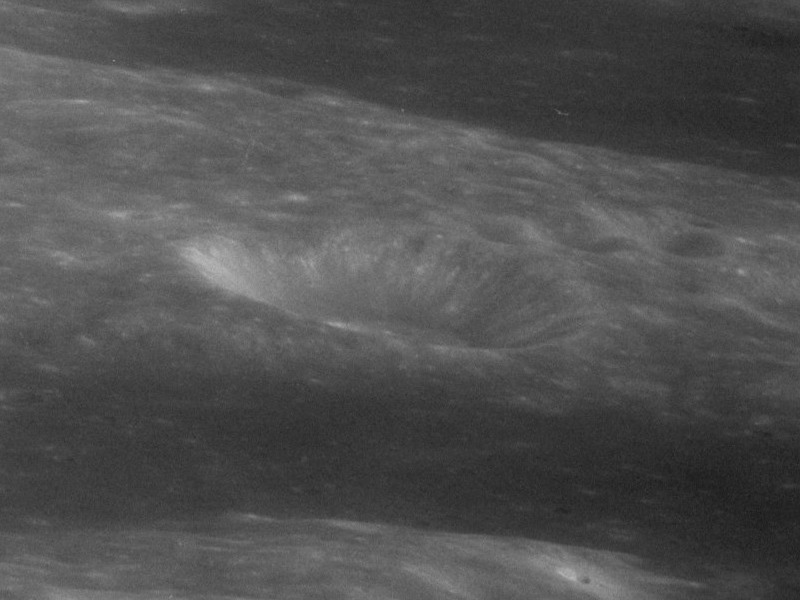
Oblique view from Apollo 11

Sabatier is a small lunar impact crater that is located near the eastern limb of the Moon, at the southwestern fringes of the Mare Marginis.

It lies in a relatively isolated area, with the nearest named crater being the walled plain called Neper to the southeast. This is a nearly circular formation, with a low outer rim and a circular floor about half the crater's diameter.
