= Schönfeld =

Schönfeld may refer to:

== Places ==
=== Germany ===
- Schönfeld, Brandenburg, in the district Uckermark, Brandenburg
- Schönfeld, Lübbenau, a quarter of Lübbenau, Brandenburg
- Schönfeld, Mecklenburg-Vorpommern, in the district of Demmin, Mecklenburg-Vorpommern
- Schönfeld, Saxony, in the district Riesa-Großenhain, Saxony
- Schönfeld, Saxony-Anhalt, in the district of Stendal, Saxony-Anhalt

=== Poland ===
- Gliśnica, Greater Poland Voivodeship, in western Poland was temporarily called Schönfeld during the German occupation from 1939–1945.

=== Czech Republic ===
- Schönfeld, former name of Krásno, a town in Sokolov District

=== Russia ===
- Schönfeld, former name of Yablonovka, a rural locality in Saratov Oblast

== People with the surname ==
- Johann Heinrich Schönfeld (1609–1684), German painter
- Nicolaus Heinrich von Schönfeld (1733–1795), German general
- Eduard Schönfeld (1828–1891), German astronomer
- Marie Schönfeld (1898–1944), Austrian government worker and anti-Nazi resistance activist
- Heinrich Schönfeld (1900–?), Austrian footballer
- Lajos Schönfeld (1901–1924), Hungarian footballer
- Solomon Schonfeld (1912–1984), British rabbi and Holocaust hero
- Avi Schönfeld (born 1947), Dutch-Israeli composer and pianist
- Sarah Schönfeld (born 1979), German artist

== Other ==
- Schönfeld (crater), a lunar crater

== See also ==
- Schoenfeld (disambiguation)
- Schonfeld
- Schönefeld
