= Roscoe Frank Sanford =

American astronomer

Roscoe Frank Sanford (October 6, 1883 – April 7, 1958) was an American astronomer.

He was born in Faribault, Minnesota, the eldest of five children of Frank W. Sanford and his wife Alberta Nichols. After an early education in his home town he attended the University of Minnesota, where he received an A.B. in 1905. He was also a runner up for a Rhodes scholarship.

He taught High School students for a year then became an assistant at the Lick Observatory. The Carnegie Institute of Washington approved plans by Lewis Boss for an observation station in South America, and Roscoe Sanford was selected to travel there as an assistant. The nine-man group spent nearly two years making observations of the brightest-magnitude stars in the southern hemisphere, with Roscoe making telescope observations and meridian-circle readings.

After returning to the United States, he went back to South America in 1911 as an assistant at the Lick southern station in Santiago, Chile. There he developed an interest in stellar spectra using photography. Among his work was measurements of velocities of the Magellanic Clouds, the first such study of extra-galactic velocities.

He returned to Lick Observatory in 1915, and was granted the Martin Kellogg Fellowship until 1916 then the Lick Fellowship up to 1917. He was awarded his Ph.D. in 1917 from the University of California. The same year he was married to Mabel Aline Dyer. The couple would have five children: Jane, Eleanor, Wallace, Allan and Marguerite. Coincidentally, his greatgranddaughter, Kelsey, was born on what would have been his 110th birthday in Michigan.

Dr. Sanford spent a short time working at the Dudley Observatory, then joined the staff of the Mount Wilson Observatory. He would remain there for much of the remainder of his career, retiring in 1949. He then spent two years on classified research before returning to Mount Wilson where he continued to contribute until 1956.

During his career he published over sixty papers, many of them dealing with the spectra of spectroscopic binaries, variable stars, and Cepheid variables, including radial velocity measurements. His most significant contribution was to the study of R- and N-class stars belonging to the cool red dwarf type (later reclassified as Carbon stars). He published an atlas of the spectra for late-type Carbon stars, and also determined the spectral features of the isotope carbon-13.

In 1944 he was president of the Astronomical Society of the Pacific, and he served on two of the commissions (29 and 30) of the International Astronomical Union. He was literate in Spanish and wrote two papers in that language.

The crater Sanford on the Moon is named after him.
