= Sisakyan (crater) =

Crater on the Moon

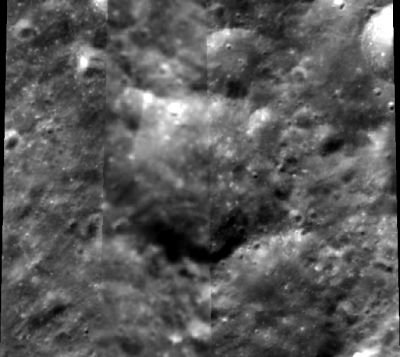
- Clementine mosaic
- Coordinates: 41.2°N 109.0°E
- Diameter: 34 km
- Depth: Unknown
- Colongitude: 251° at sunrise
- Eponym: Norajr M. Sisakyan

Sisakyan is a lunar impact crater that is located on the Moon's far side, beyond the northeastern rim. It lies to the east of the huge walled plain Harkhebi, and north of the crater Sumner and the Catena Sumner crater chain.

This is a heavily eroded crater formation with a rugged outer rim and an uneven interior floor. There are smaller craters attached to the exterior rim along the northwest, northeast, and southeast.

== Satellite craters ==
By convention these features are identified on lunar maps by placing the letter on the side of the crater midpoint that is closest to Sisakyan.

| Sisakyan | Latitude | Longitude | Diameter |
|---|---|---|---|
| C | 42.1° N | 110.9° E | 17 km |
| D | 42.0° N | 111.0° E | 52 km |
| E | 41.4° N | 110.7° E | 19 km |
