= Blackett (crater) =

Lunar impact crater

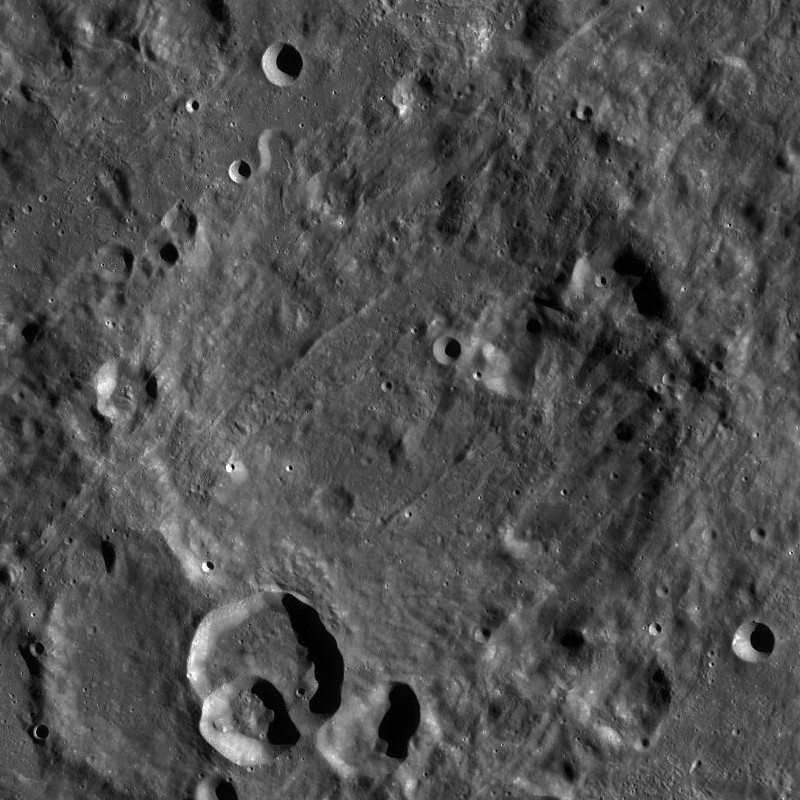
- LRO WAC image
- Coordinates: 37.5°S 116.1°W
- Diameter: 145.31 km (90.29 mi)
- Depth: Unknown
- Colongitude: 119° at sunrise
- Formation: Pre-Nectarian
- Eponym: Patrick M. S. Blackett

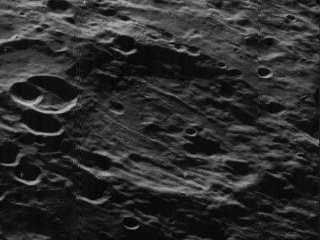
Oblique Lunar Orbiter 5 image, facing west

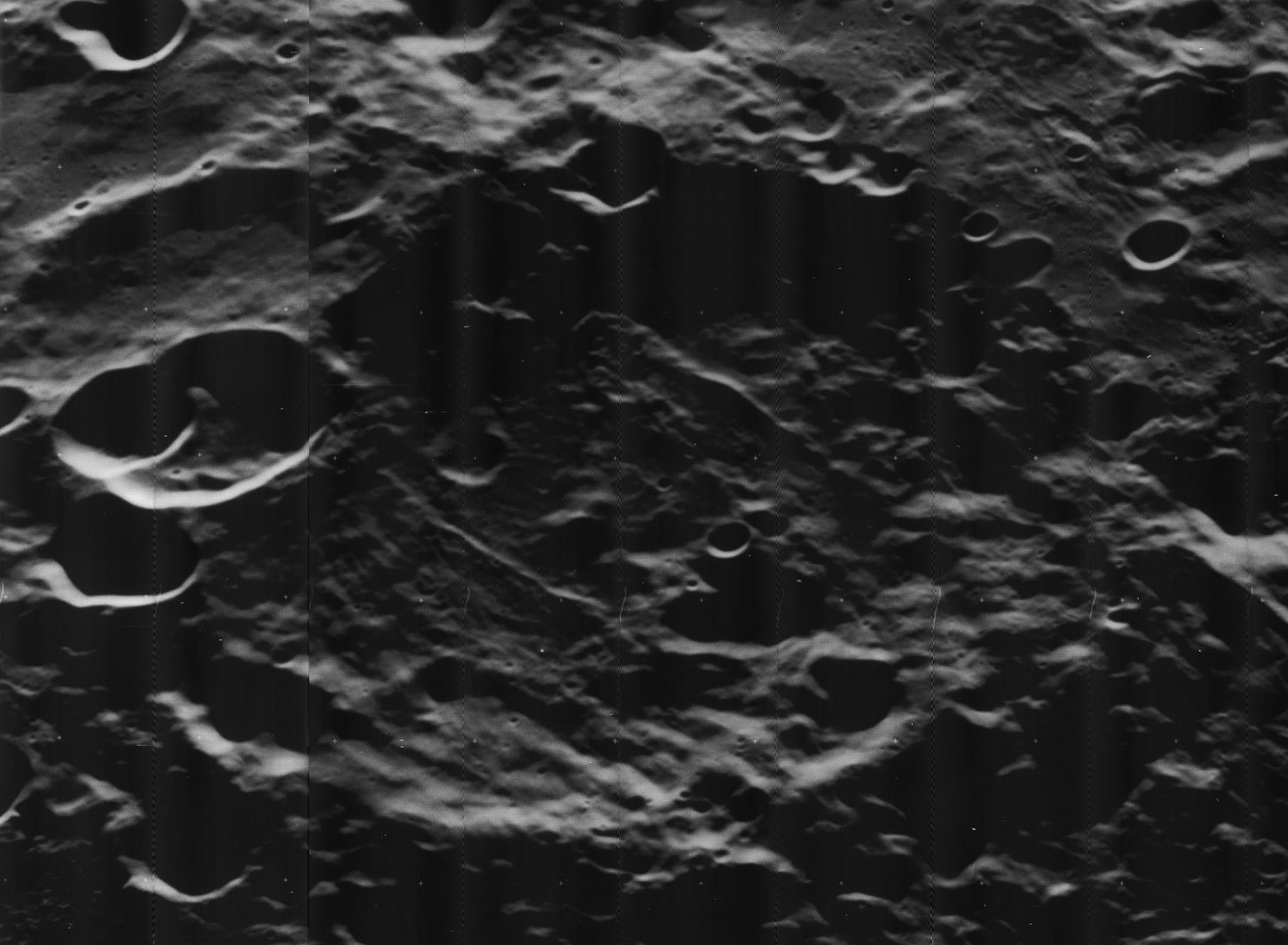
Another Lunar Orbiter 5 image, facing west

Blackett is a lunar impact crater that lies on the far side of the Moon, behind the southwest limb. It lies beyond the southeast outer ring of the immense Mare Orientale basin. The formation of that major feature has left Blackett deeply marked with ridge features trending from the northwest. Much of the crater has been shaped by the ejecta from Mare Orientale, particularly along the western half of the crater.

On the lunar geologic timescale, this formation dates to the Pre-Nectarian period. Overall this crater is heavily eroded, with several craters overlaying the southern rim, and smaller formations overlaying the western and northwestern rim. The interior floor has been roughened by ejecta from multiple sources, leaving only parts of the southwest interior in their previous relatively level and featureless condition. The crater Stetson is attached to the southwest rim.

This crater is named after British physicist Patrick M. S. Blackett (1897-1974). He was the 1948 Nobel laurette in Physics. Its designation was formally adopted by the International Astronomical Union in 1979.

== Satellite craters ==
By convention these features are identified on lunar maps by placing the letter on the side of the crater midpoint that is closest to Blackett.

Blackett	Latitude	Longitude	Diameter
N	39.9° S	116.2° W	23 km
