= Norair Sisakian =

Soviet biochemist

- Նորայր Սիսակյան
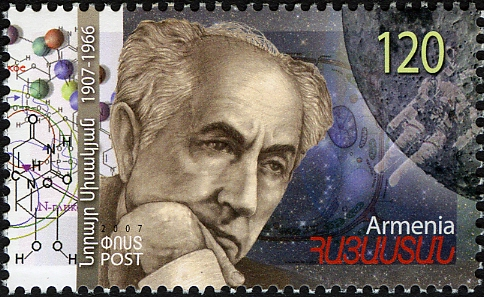
- 2007 stamp of Armenia
- Born: 25 January 1907; Ashtarak, Etchmiadzin uezd, Erivan Governorate, Russian Empire
- Died: 12 March 1966 (aged 59); Moscow, Russian SFSR, Soviet Union
- Occupation: Biochemist
- Known for: One of the founders of space biology
- Children: Alexei Sisakian; Iosif Sisakian; Lyudmila Budagova

Norair Martirosovich Sisakian (Sissakian) (Armenian: Նորայր Մարտիրոսի Սիսակյան; Russian: Норайр Мартиросович Сисакян, 25 January 1907 – 12 March 1966) was a Soviet biologist of Armenian origin who worked as an engineer in the Soviet space program, working mainly on biomechanics effects. Sisakian is also one of the founders of space biology, an outstanding organizer of science, a member of the Pugwash movement.

He was a Member of the Presidium of the Academy of Sciences of the Soviet Union, a member of the Armenian Academy of Sciences, the vice-president of the International Academy of Astronautics, the Chairman of the Committee on Bioastronautics of the International Astronautics Federation. In 1964 he was unanimously elected as a President of the 21st session of the UNESCO General Conference.

== Biography ==
Sisakian finished the Yerevan State University and then the Moscow Agricultural Academy in 1932. From 1935 he worked in the Moscow Institute of biochemics after A. N. Bach. Professor of the Moscow State University. During his life Sisakian created fourteen laboratories and the Puschin center of the Russian Academy of Sciences.

He is well known for his concept on chloroplasts as poly-functional cell structures. He greatly contributed to the Soviet space program.

A crater on the Far side of the Moon was named in his honor. In 2001 the "Academician Norair Martirosovich Sissakian" book was released by the Russian publishing house "Nauka". A school and a prospect in Yerevan are named after him. A museum of Sisakian was opened in his hometown Ashtarak, Armenia.

In 2007 Sisakian's name was added to the List of notable dates of UNESCO.

His son, Alexei Sisakian (1944–2010), was a well-known physicist, academic of the Russian Academy of Sciences and Armenian Academy of Sciences, the vice-president of "Dubna" International University, director of the Joint Institute for Nuclear Research in Dubna, Russia.

== Awards and honors ==
- Three Orders of the Red Banner of Labour (1945, 1954, 1961)
- Stalin Prize, 3rd class (1952)
- Order of the Badge of Honour

== Books ==
- (in Russian) Norair Martirosovich Sisakian, Moscow, 1967 (Series on Biochemics)
