= Gellio Sasceride =

Danish astronomer, professor and physician

Gellio Sasceride (Sasserides) (3 March 1562 - 9 November 1612) was a Danish astronomer, professor and physician. The crater Sasserides on the Moon is named after him. It lies near Tycho, named after Tycho Brahe.

== Biography ==
Sasceride was born in Copenhagen, Denmark. He enrolled in the University of Wittenberg to study medicine, philosophy and natural sciences. In 1593, he received his doctorate in medicine in Basel. In 1603 he became a professor of medicine at the University of Copenhagen. In 1609, he was appointed rector of the university.

He worked as an assistant to Tycho Brahe after studying under him from 1581 to 1587. It is believed that the following words were written by Sasceride to Brahe: Quia adhuc aliquid superest spatii, quae sequuntur paucula, sic expetente typographo, subiungi permisi ex literis cuiusdam medicinae Doctoris, Patavii commorantis, ad quendam studiosum Danum.

Sasceride was also friends with Galileo. On 28 December 1592, after Galileo had begun his studies, he wrote a letter to Sasceride (at the time no longer Brahe's assistant) with the words Exordium erat splendidum ("[my] debut was excellent"). In 1590, Sasceride had sent to Galileo the only copy of a book until then found in Italy detailing the heliocentric system.

== Notes ==
1. J. L. E. Dreyer, Tycho Brahe: ein Bild wissenschaftlichen Lebens und Arbeitens im sechszehnten Jahrhundert (Karlsruhe: Druck und Verlag der G. Braun'schen Hofbuchhandlung, 1894), p. 277.
