= Ritchey (lunar crater) =

Crater on the Moon

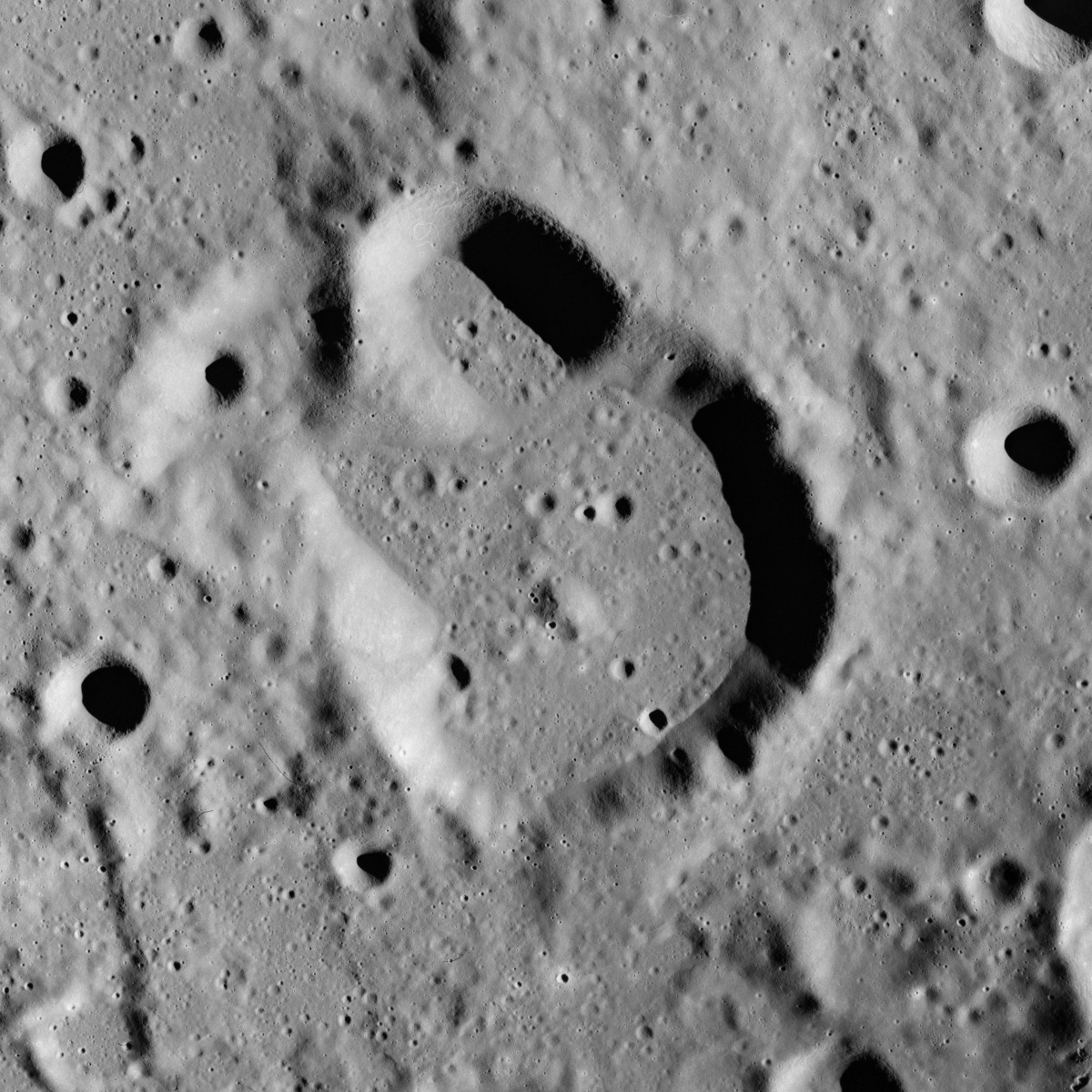
- Apollo 16 image
- Coordinates: 11.1°S 8.5°E
- Diameter: 25 km
- Depth: 1.30 km (0.81 mi)
- Colongitude: 352° at sunrise
- Eponym: George W. Ritchey

Ritchey is a small lunar impact crater named after the American astronomer George Willis Ritchey. The crater is situated to the east of Albategnius in the central lunar highlands. Its somewhat angular rim is broken along the northwestern wall by a pair of smaller, adjacent craters. The floor of Ritchey is fairly flat, with a pair of small central mounds.

== Satellite craters ==
By convention these features are identified on lunar maps by placing the letter on the side of the satellite midpoint that is closest to Ritchey.

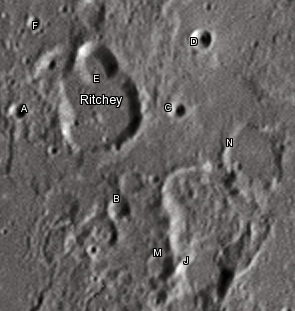
Ritchey crater and its satellite craters taken from Earth in 2012 at the University of Hertfordshire's Bayfordbury Observatory with the telescopes Meade LX200 14" and Lumenera Skynyx 2-1

Ritchey	Latitude	Longitude	Diameter
A	11.3° S	7.7° E	6 km
B	11.9° S	8.9° E	7 km
C	10.9° S	9.2° E	6 km
D	10.2° S	9.2° E	6 km
E	10.7° S	8.4° E	14 km
F	10.5° S	7.6° E	4 km
J	12.3° S	9.9° E	17 km
M	12.4° S	9.5° E	8 km
N	11.1° S	10.0° E	17 km
