= Schönfeld (crater) =

Crater on the Moon

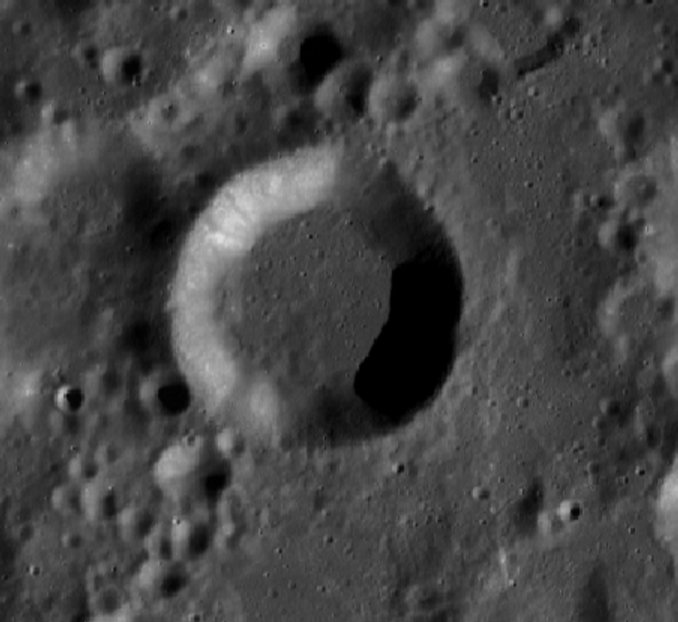
- Schönfeld Crater
- Coordinates: 44.8°N 98.1°W
- Diameter: 25 km
- Depth: Unknown
- Colongitude: 98° at sunrise
- Eponym: Eduard Schönfeld

Schönfeld is a lunar impact crater that is located just beyond the northwestern limb of the Moon, on the far side from the Earth. This part of the surface can sometimes be brought into view during periods of favorable libration and illumination, although not much detail can be discerned. This crater is located to the north of Avicenna and the huge walled plain Lorentz. To the northwest lies the crater Rynin and to the northeast is McLaughlin.

This is a small, bowl-shaped feature with a generally circular, sharp-edged rim, although there is a slight elongation at the northern tip. The inner walls are simple slopes that run down to the featureless interior floor. Schönfeld partly overlies an older, crater-like feature of comparable dimensions along its western side.
