= Ary Abramovich Sternfeld =

Polish-Russian early spaceflight scientist

Ary Sternfeld
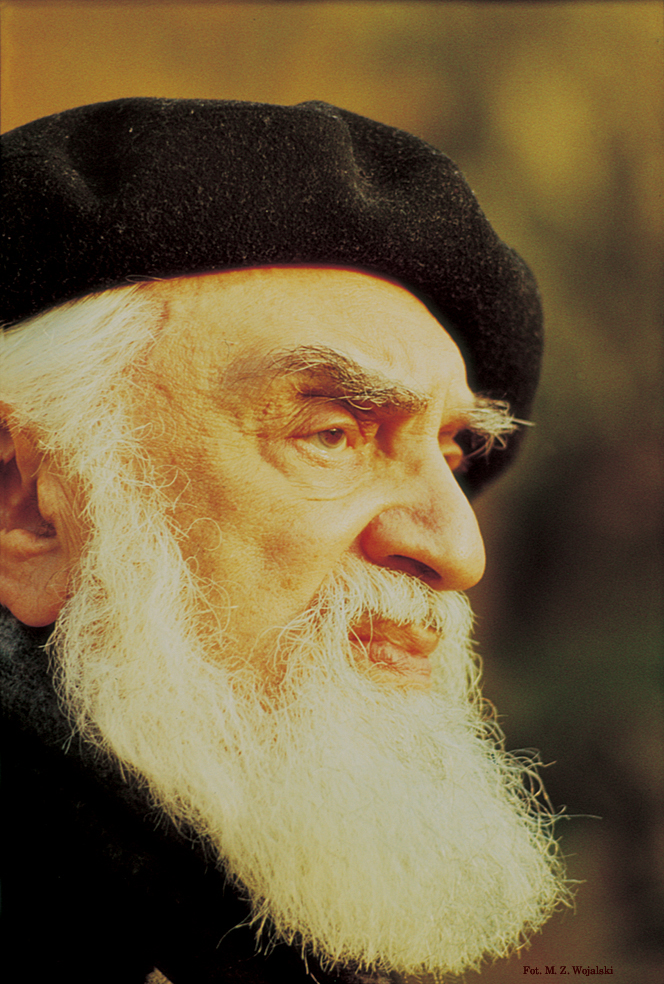
- Born: 14 May 1905; Sieradz, Russian Empire
- Died: 5 July 1980 (aged 75); Moscow, USSR
- Education: Nancy-Université
- Occupations: Rocket engineer and designer
- Spouse: Gustava Erlich

Ary Sternfeld (14 May 1905 – 5 July 1980) was co-creator of the modern aerospace science. He was a Polish engineer of Jewish origin, who studied in Poland and France. From 1935 until his death he worked in Moscow.

He was the first person to describe the bi-elliptic transfer technique of changing orbits, in 1934.

In 1934, Sternfeld won the Prix REP-Hirsch (later known as the Prix d'Astronautique) of the French Astronomical Society for his book Initiation à la Cosmonautique. He is thus credited with introducing the word cosmonautics in the language of science and engineering.

== Early life ==
Ary Abramovich Sternfeld was born 14 May 1905 in the city of Sieradz in Poland, then in Kalisz Governorate of Russian Empire, near Łódź, into a merchant family. He had three sisters. From a young age he displayed wonderful memory, a good imagination and a sharp mind. He was still a child when he considered a trip to the moon, when he saw the moon return to a crescent at the start of the month and prayed with his father that the moon would remain unobtainable to enemies, but wondered why it was unobtainable. He considered flying through space. The implementation of his dream -the day would come when flying through space would go from a fantasy to reality-gave him life. When World War One broke out, the family moved to Łódź. Here, Ary attended a Jewish gymnasium. In school his first ideas about implementing spaceflight appeared. It was advisable to use a rocket with fuel onboard. He later had another idea to send a rocket from the sun, using the heat. At 17, he read in German Einstein's monograph about relativity. He did not understand a lot of it. He decided to write to Einstein with his questions. Afterwards, he developed his theories on cosmonautics.

== Student years ==
After graduating from the gymnasium, Ari entered the school of philosophy at Jagiellonian University in Krakow. He finished the curriculum in spring 1924. He left for France, in order to have the means to study not just natural science, but also engineering. He enrolled in École nationale supérieure d'électricité et de mécanique (ENSEM) in Nancy. He struggled during the first year. He needed to earn a living and support his impoverished parents. For several months until the school year started, he worked all day, starting in the famous Parisian market The Belly of Paris, later in the day in the factory Reno, and he did not have the means to learn French so he worked among immigrants. Thus when school started he did not understand French, the language of the lectures. He lived in poverty. When the money from summer work was not enough, he worked early in the morning controlling gas counters. Despite the daily struggle, he was cheerful, sociable, curious and successfully entered his second year. In the summer he worked for the car company Omer Samyn in Paris and when classes resumed, he resumed his old job. During this time, he continued to consider flying in space. This was not an abstract dream, but concrete calculations that he implemented. He later wrote, "My colleagues, the dreams and schemes that I plotted between lectures seemed to me incurable fantasies...in those days, to fly across the Atlantic Ocean became a sensation, and here to possess the power to control the universe..." After three years of selfless labour and tireless study, he became an engineer.

== Paris and the Sorbonne ==
As an engineer, Sternfeld returned to Paris. He worked as a technologist, designer and consultant for various technological enterprises. He obtained a few patents. In the apartment where he lived, they jokingly nicknamed him "Banker". Students and new engineers take a long time and Sternfeld, already needing testing, needed to return. He began to settle down so that he could focus on his favourite work: the comprehensive study of spaceflight. In 1928 Sternfeld studied for a doctorate in Sorbonne in order to work on a dissertation about spaceflight. He went to the Central Research Institute in Paris in order to collect research for his dissertation, only to find that the studies he was looking for existed "nowhere", according to the people there of whom he asked for help. Many times he conducted research in the National Library of France. There he collected materials on the history and technology of rocketry, questions about flight mechanics, and calculated the trajectories of machines in space. In 1931, when all was said and done for Sternfeld's dissertation, his advisor stated that he would not be responsible for a research topic so far removed from reality. The advisor requested that he change the topic for an elevated stipend, but no Earthly good could stop Sternfeld from pursuing his childhood dream. He decided to continue the thesis at his own risk. During this time, he met his future wife Gustava Erlich. Like Ary, Gustava came from Łódź in 1924. She was an active and captivating person. She had been chosen to work as a secretary for the Polish department of a French company, and was an Esperantist. In Sorbonne, she was working on two degrees in child development and teaching French to foreigners. She ultimately edited his scientific work in French, Russian, Polish, German and Yiddish.

== Tsiolkovsky's penpal ==
While working on his dissertation, Sternfeld found out about Tsiolkovsky's work in 1929 in the German rocketry journal "Die Raket". In this time, Sternfeld did not know Russian and Tsiolkovsky only worked in Russian, so he studied Russian. The first book that he read in Russian was Tsiolkovsky's Plan of Space Exploration (Исследование мировых пространств реактивными приборами). It was impossible to get Tsiolkovsky's work in Paris, since no library in France had it. 11 June 1930 Sternfeld wrote a letter to Tsiolkovsky with a request to send his work. They wrote letters to each other in friendship until Tsiolkovsky died. 19 August 1930 the French magazine L’Humanité published Sternfeld's article "From Yesterday's Utopia to Today's Reality". In this article, he wrote about Tsiolkovsky's priorities and put in a picture that Tsiolkovsky had given him for the article. In the next few years, Sternfeld mentioned Tsiolkovsky in his publications. The book that Tsiolkovsky sent him ended up in Paris' National Library.

== Introduction to cosmonautics ==
In order to continue his research, Sternfeld returned to his parents in Łódź in 1932. He worked in a dim room. It was necessary to do a lot of calculations. He did not have electronics as he did in Paris. Still, he wrote many scientific papers. He wrote in French the monograph "Introduction to Cosmonautics" (Initiation à la Cosmonautique). The word "cosmonautics" had previously not existed in neither French nor Russian. He introduced this as a combination of the terms "astronautics" and "star navigation". Here he stated the combined problems of communication and conquest of space. He worked on many problems. "This was the first systematic summary of the population of the problems in communication with the upcoming conquest of space, from the building of the solar system to the relativistic effects on spaceflight." He reported the investigation back to Warsaw University 6 December 1933. However, spaceflight continued to seem like fantasy.

== French Academy of Science ==
Once again, Sternfeld returned to Paris. There he continued research. On 22 January 1934 Sternfeld was accepted into the French Academy of Science. During this time, he received articles from Herman Oberth and Walter Hohmann. He worked with the French cosmonauticist Robert Esnault-Pelterie.

== USSR ==
In 1932 Sternfeld moved to Moscow to work on an android. Here, he made copies of his "Introduction to Cosmonautics". Starting in 1935, he worked for the Institute of Reactive Scientific Research [Реактивного научно-исследовательского института]). There, he worked with Korolyov, along with other young, talented engineers: Glushko, Tikhonravov, Pobedonostsev. The chief engineer was Langemak, a rocketry pioneer who went on to design the Katyusha rocket. He translated "Introduction to Cosmonautics" into Russian. By the end of the 1930s, the government had repressed many of the workers at institute. Sternfeld was not repressed, but he was dismissed in 1937. Over the next few years, he worked in cosmonautics for the USSR Academy of Sciences. In the beginning years of World War Two, the Sternfeld's two daughters were born. In June 1941 Sternfeld wrote a letter of request to join the Red Army, but they denied his request. Instead, the family went to the city of Serov in the Urals. Sternfeld taught physics, material science, design and machinery there, while Gustava taught German.

After the war, Sternfeld continued to write about cosmonautics, into the space era.

He died in Moscow, Russia.

== See also ==
- Sternfeld, lunar crater
