= Sternfeld (crater) =

Crater on the Moon

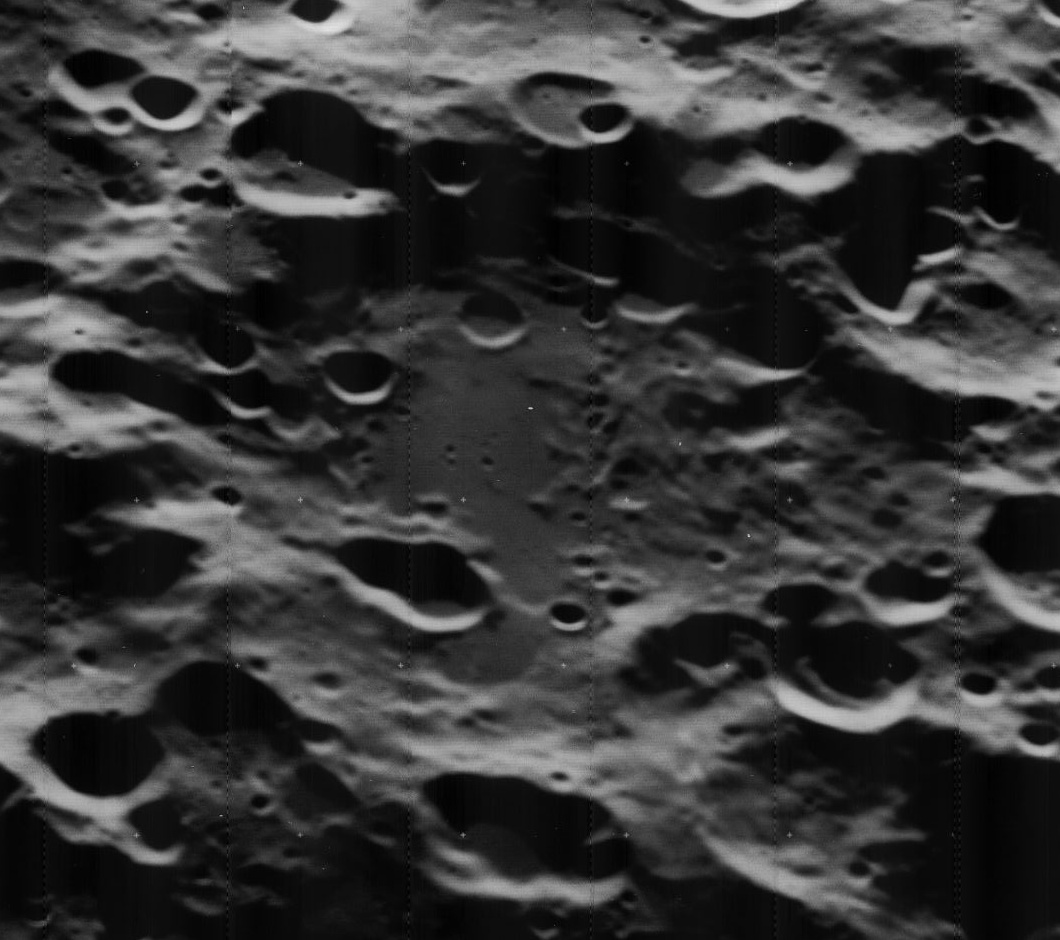
- Oblique Lunar Orbiter 5 image
- Coordinates: 19.6°S 141.2°W
- Diameter: 100 km
- Depth: Unknown
- Colongitude: 143° at sunrise
- Eponym: Ary A. Sternfeld

Sternfeld is a lunar impact crater on the far side of the Moon. It lies to the south-southwest of the crater Paschen, and to the east-southeast of the smaller Lodygin.

This is a heavily eroded crater formation with an outer rim that has been considerably worn by subsequent impacts. As a result, the outer rim is irregular and poorly defined. Intruding slightly into the northwestern outer rim is the satellite crater Lodygin F. The northern part of the rim and interior floor are marked by a number of smaller impacts. There is a small crater in the southern part of the interior floor.

This formation is named after Ary A. Sternfeld, Soviet spaceflight scientist. The name was adopted by IAU in 1991.
