= Schneller (crater) =

Crater on the Moon

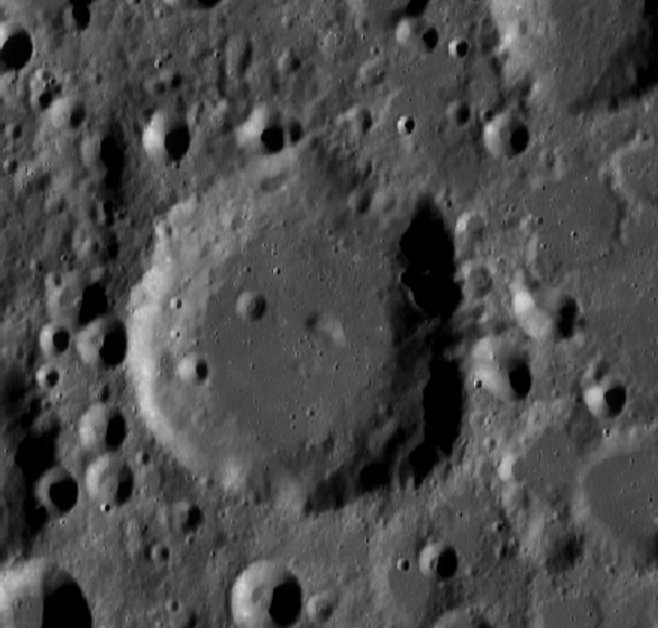
- LRO image
- Coordinates: 41.34°N 163.73°W
- Diameter: 56.87 km (35.34 mi)
- Depth: Unknown
- Colongitude: 164° at sunrise
- Eponym: Herbert Schneller

Schneller is a lunar impact crater on the Moon's far side. It is located in the northern latitudes to the southwest of the crater Woltjer. This is a heavily worn and eroded crater that has a somewhat uneven rim with outward bulges to the southeast and northeast. The rim is nearly non-existent along the northwestern side. The interior of this crater is relatively featureless, with only a few small, indistinct craterlets.

The crater was formally named by the IAU in 1970 after German astronomer Herbert Schneller.

== Satellite craters ==
By convention these features are identified on lunar maps by placing the letter on the side of the crater midpoint that is closest to Schneller.

| Schneller | Latitude | Longitude | Diameter |
|---|---|---|---|
| G | 40.8° N | 159.8° W | 20 km |
| H | 39.9° N | 160.2° W | 35 km |
| L | 39.5° N | 162.7° W | 25 km |
| S | 40.8° N | 166.3° W | 37 km |
