= Lunar north pole =

Northernmost point on the Moon

Lunar north polar region mosaic by LRO. The north pole is in the center.

The lunar north pole is the point in the Northern Hemisphere of the Moon where the lunar axis of rotation meets its surface.

The lunar north pole is the northernmost point on the Moon, lying diametrically opposite the lunar south pole. It defines latitude 90° North. At the lunar north pole all directions point south; all lines of longitude converge there, so its longitude can be defined as any degree value.

== Craters ==
Notable craters in the lunar north polar region (between 60° North latitude and the North pole) include: Avogadro, Bel'kovich, Brianchon, Emden, Florey, Gamow, Goldschmidt, Hermite, J. Herschel, Meton, Nansen, Pascal, Petermann, Philolaus, Plaskett, Pythagoras, Rozhdestvenskiy, Schwarzschild, Seares, Sommerfeld, Stebbins, Sylvester, Thales, Van't Hoff, W. Bond, and Whipple.

== Exploration ==
The Astrobotic Technology Icebreaker mission was a mission concept planned for a 2015 mission, then delayed to 2016, and then cancelled. It was meant as a competition to win the Google Lunar X Prize.

== See also ==
- Colonization of the Moon
- Lunar Reconnaissance Orbiter
- Selenography
- Lunar south pole
