= Thiessen (crater) =

Crater on the Moon

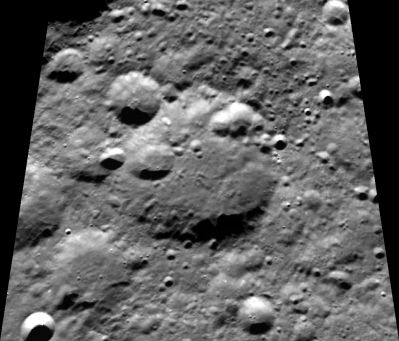
- Clementine mosaic
- Coordinates: 75.4°N 169.0°W
- Diameter: 66 km
- Depth: 4.01 km (2.49 mi)
- Colongitude: 173° at sunrise
- Eponym: Georg H. Thiessen

Thiessen is a lunar impact crater that lies in the far northern latitudes, on the far side of the Moon. To the west of Thiessen is the younger crater Ricco, and to the south-southwest is Roberts. Further to the east lies Heymans.

This is a heavily worn crater with overlapping impacts along the rim to the northeast, northwest, and west. A small crater occupies the northwestern interior floor. The remaining rim is worn and rounded, and the crater is now essentially a depression in the surface.

== Satellite craters ==
By convention these features are identified on lunar maps by placing the letter on the side of the crater midpoint that is closest to Thiessen.

Thiessen	Latitude	Longitude	Diameter
Q	73.9° N	174.6° W	39 km
W	76.3° N	173.2° W	24 km
