= Hermite (crater) =

Lunar impact crater

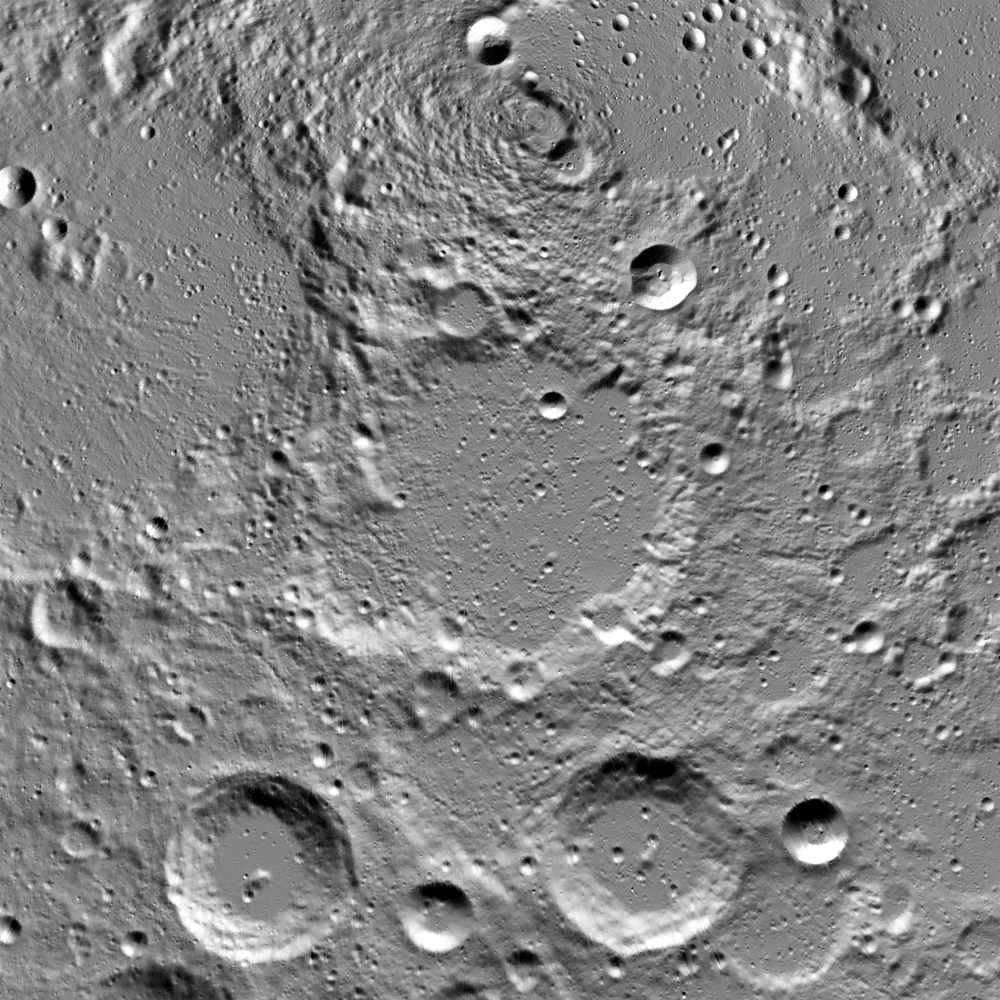
- Topographic map of Hermite (center) by LRO's laser altimeter
- Coordinates: 86.17°N 93.32°W
- Diameter: 108.64 km (67.51 mi)
- Depth: Unknown
- Colongitude: 110° at sunrise
- Eponym: Charles Hermite

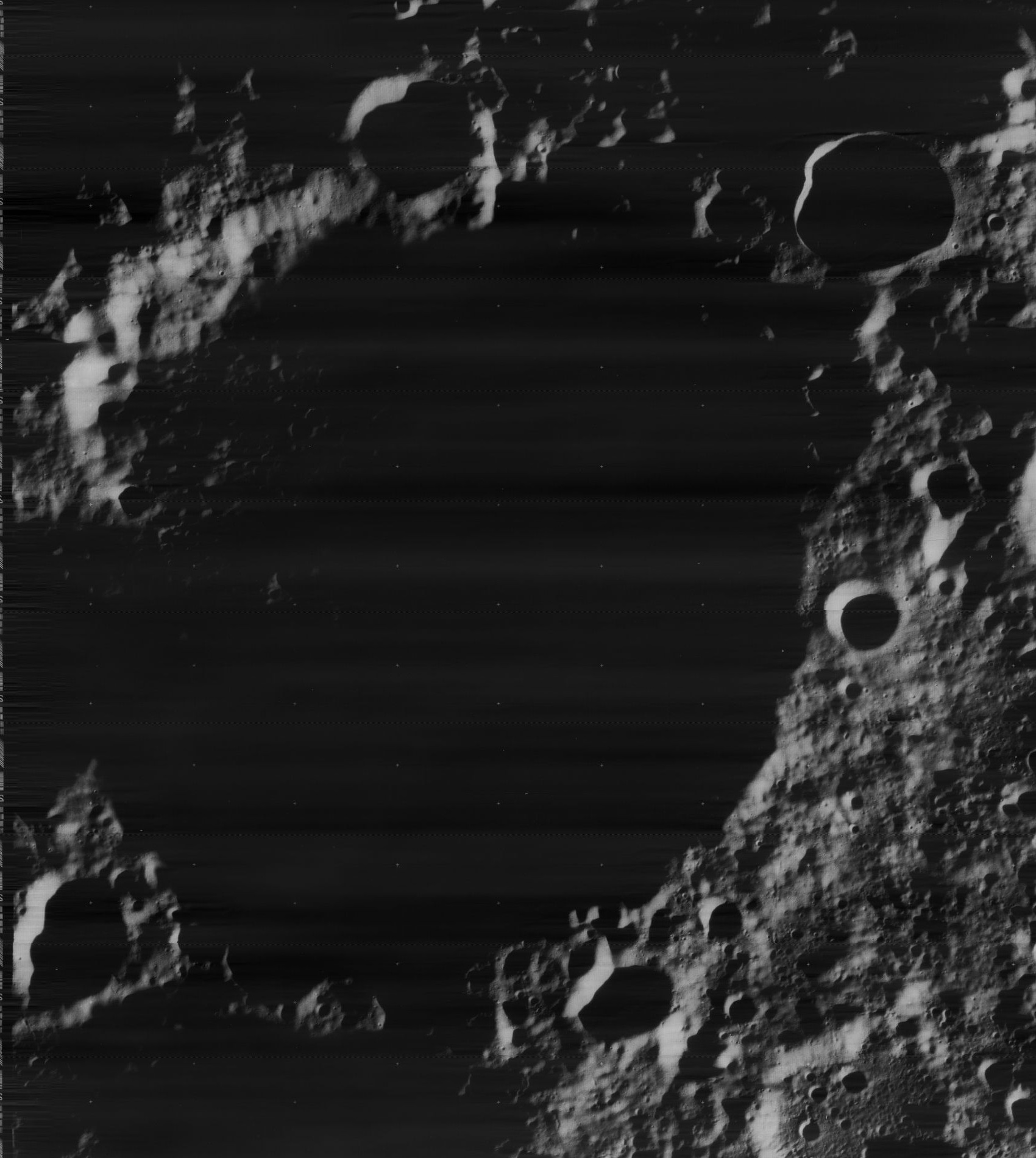
Lunar Orbiter 4 image of Hermite and surrounding craters

Hermite is a lunar impact crater located along the northern lunar limb, close to the north pole of the Moon. Attached to the northwest rim is the small crater Aepinus. To the west is the crater Rozhdestvenskiy, and to the south are Lovelace and Sylvester. Grignard is incised into the southwest rim. From the Earth, this crater is viewed nearly from the side at a latitude of 86° N, which means it is illuminated by oblique sunlight.

This crater was named for French mathematician Charles Hermite (1822-1901). His name was introduced into lunar nomenclature by David W. G. Arthur and Ewen Whitaker with the Rectified Lunar Atlas (1963). It was officially adopted by the International Astronomical Union in 1964.

== Physical features ==
This crater was formed roughly 3.91 billion years ago, dating it to Nectarian period of the lunar geologic timescale. Hermite is a worn, eroded crater with a rugged outer rim that is notched and incised from past impacts. A crater overlies the southwestern rim, and the two formations have merged to share a common interior floor. A pair of small craters lie along the southern part of the rim. The interior floor has been resurfaced, so that it forms a wide plain that is pock-marked by numerous tiny craterlets and low hills. There is a small crater on the floor near the northeastern wall.

The 16.74 km (10.40 mi) diameter crater Aepinus is attached to the northwest rim of Hermite. On average, the rim of this crater receives illumination from the Sun 86.08% of the time, the highest on the Moon. This could make it a useful location for a moonbase. The crater was unnamed until it was given a designation along with 18 other craters by the IAU on January 22, 2009. It was named after the German-Russian astronomer Franz Aepinus (c. 1724 – c. 1802).

In 2009, it was discovered by NASA's Lunar Reconnaissance Orbiter that Hermite is the coldest place recorded in the Solar System, with temperatures at 26 K (−247 °C; −413 °F). For comparison, Pluto's surface only gets down to about 43 K (−230 °C; −382 °F).

== Satellite craters ==
By convention these features are identified on lunar maps by placing the letter on the side of the crater midpoint that is closest to Hermite.

Hermite	Coordinates	Diameter
A	87.8°N 47.1°W	20 km
B	87.14°N 86.2°W	8.4 km

Hermite B is an unofficial designation that has not been approved by the IAU.

=== Hermite A ===
There may exist a large amount of water ice within Hermite A's permanently shadowed region (PSR), where no light from the Sun ever reaches; according to a 2016 study published by the IEEE roughly two-thirds of the crater's PSR is covered with varying amounts of ice. However, a 2018 study also published by the IEEE countered this claim, arguing that the method used to detect ice in the earlier study was not refined enough to conclusively identify a material as ice, and that more detailed methods were needed to determine if ice exists within Hermite A. A further analysis of the crater in 2022 using data from the Chandrayaan-1 and Chandrayaan-2 lunar orbiters found that ice may exist in clusters on the walls and some parts of the floor of Hermite A.
