= Yamamoto (crater) =

Crater on the Moon

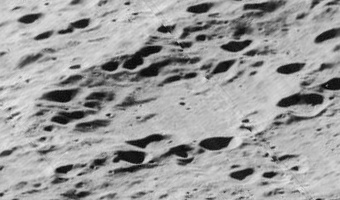
- Oblique Lunar Orbiter 5 image, facing west
- Coordinates: 58.1°N 160.9°E
- Diameter: 76 km
- Depth: Unknown
- Colongitude: 200° at sunrise
- Eponym: Issei Yamamoto

Yamamoto is a damaged lunar impact crater that is located to the north of the large walled plain called D'Alembert. To the north-northeast is the crater Avogadro. This feature lies on the northern hemisphere of the Moon's far side.

Several parts of the crater rim are overlain by subsequent impacts, particularly along the northeastern section which has been almost completely obliterated. The southwest part of the floor is more irregular than the remainder of the interior, and may have been overlain by ejecta from D'Alembert or elsewhere. The northeastern floor is relatively level and featureless.

== Satellite craters ==
By convention these features are identified on lunar maps by placing the letter on the side of the crater midpoint that is closest to Yamamoto. By this IAU calculation, Yamamoto W would be located within the bowl of Oberth crater.

Yamamoto	Latitude	Longitude	Diameter
W	62.6° N	155.5° E	50 km
