= Permanently shadowed crater =

Permanently shadowed region of a body in the Solar System

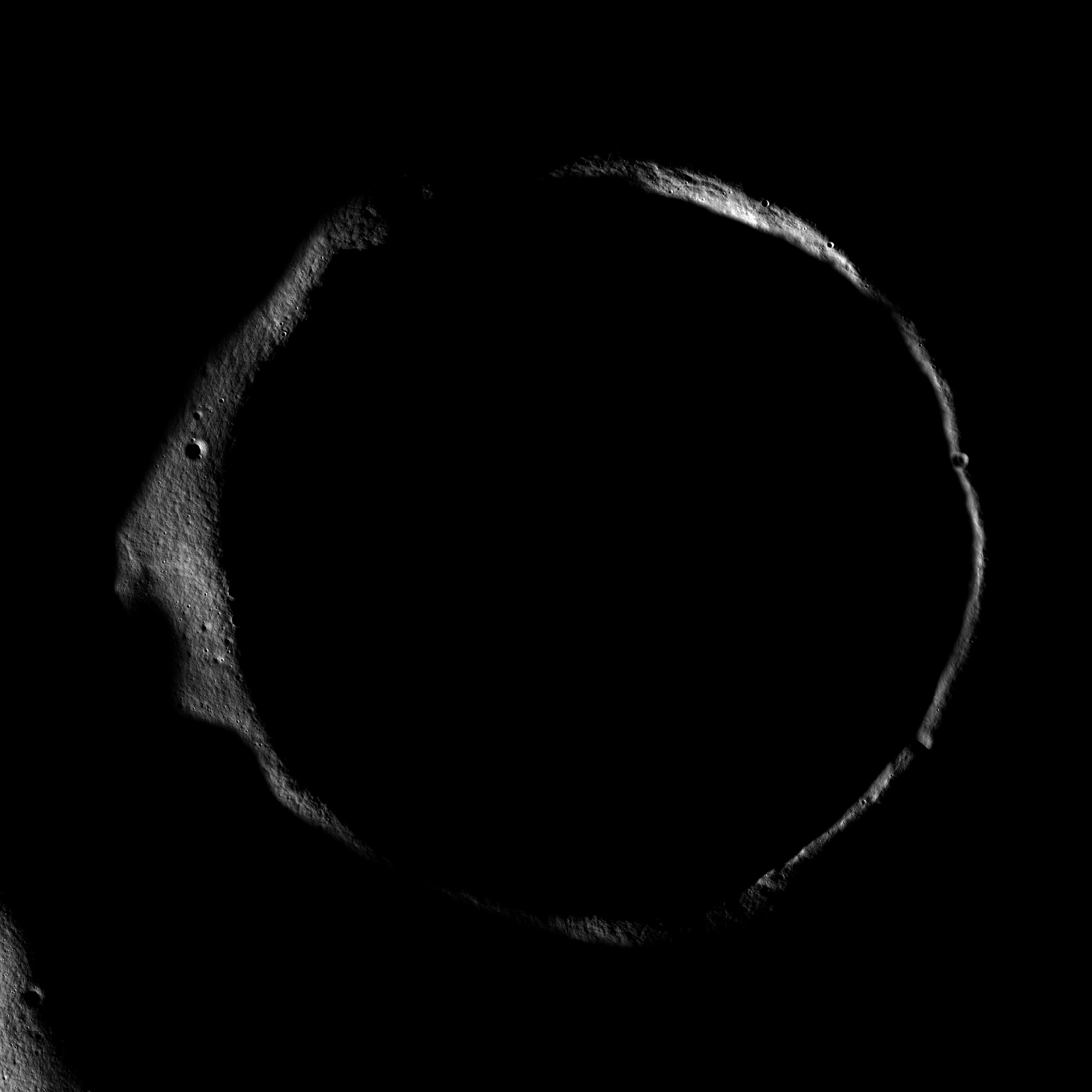
The Moon's Erlanger crater is an example of a permanently shadowed crater.

A permanently shadowed crater, or permanently shadowed region (PSR), is a depression on a body in the Solar System within which lies a point that is always in darkness. As of 2019, there are 324 known permanently shadowed regions on the Moon. Such regions also exist on Mercury and Ceres.

== Location ==
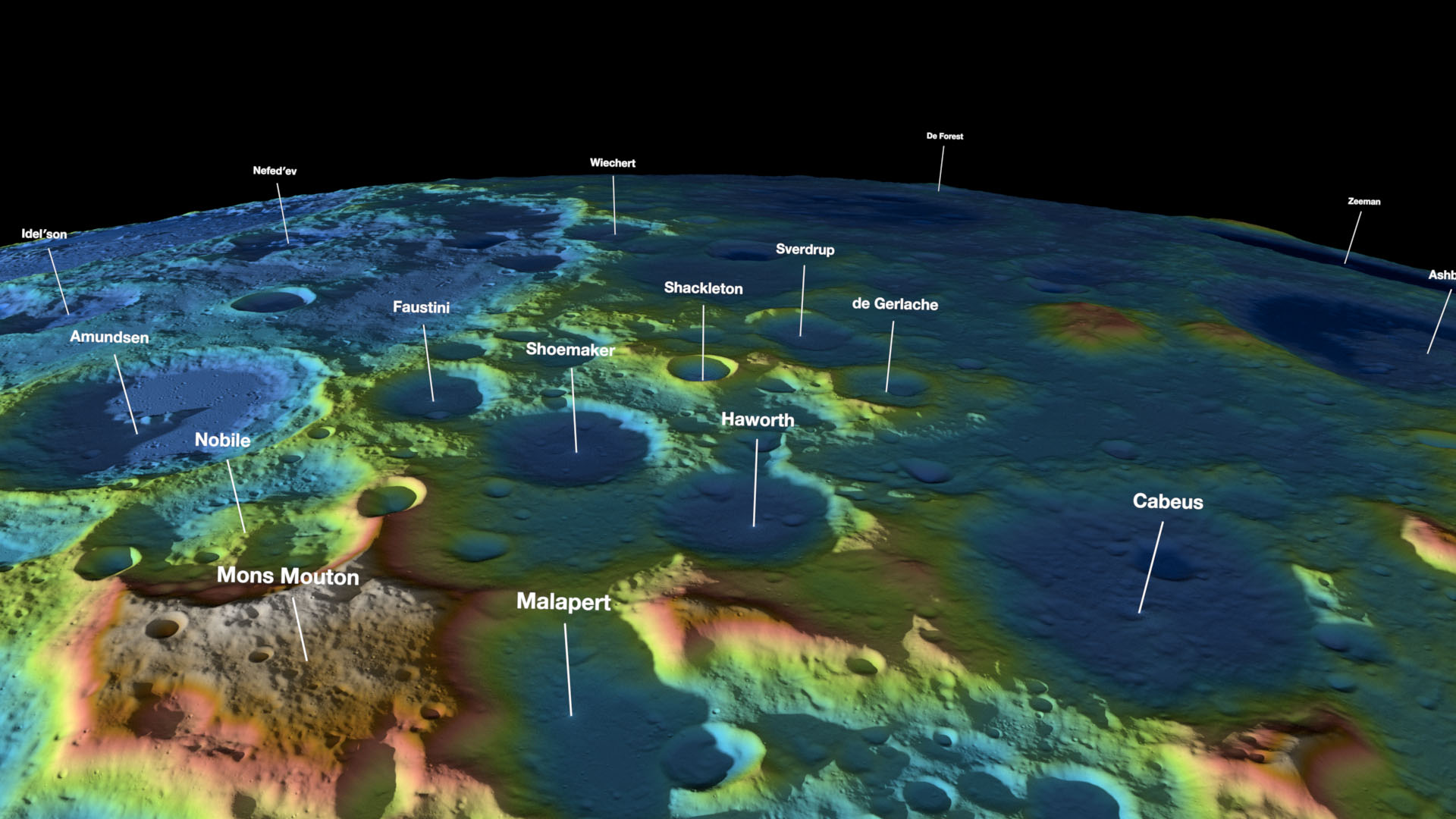
A lunar south pole terrain in coded color. Several permanently shadowed craters are shown: Shackleton, Shoemaker, Cabeus

Such a crater must be located at high latitude (close to a pole) and be on a body with very small axial tilt. The Moon has an axial tilt of about 1.5°; Mercury, 0.03°; and Ceres, about 4°. On the Moon, permanent shadow can exist at latitudes as low as 58°; approximately 50 permanently shadowed regions exist in the 58°- 65° latitude range for both lunar hemispheres. The cumulative area of permanently shadowed lunar regions is about 31 thousand km^{2}; more than half of it is in the southern hemisphere.

== Conditions inside craters ==
Craters of eternal darkness might be advantageous for space exploration and colonization, as they preserve sources of water ice that can be converted into drinkable water, breathable oxygen, and rocket propellant. Several of such craters show indications of water ice in their interiors, including Rozhdestvenskiy and Cabeus craters on the Moon, and Juling Crater on Ceres. Other volatiles besides water can also be trapped in such craters, such as mercury. The LCROSS mission additionally found native silver and gold in permanently shadowed craters on the Moon, probably brought there by electrostatic dust transport, and some inconclusive evidence for platinum. Gold was estimated to have a soil mass abundance of 0.52% in these craters from LCROSS data, and mercury 0.39%. This high mercury abundance has been noted as a possible health hazard of water derived from permanently shadowed craters. The craters may also contain unusually high concentrations of helium-3.

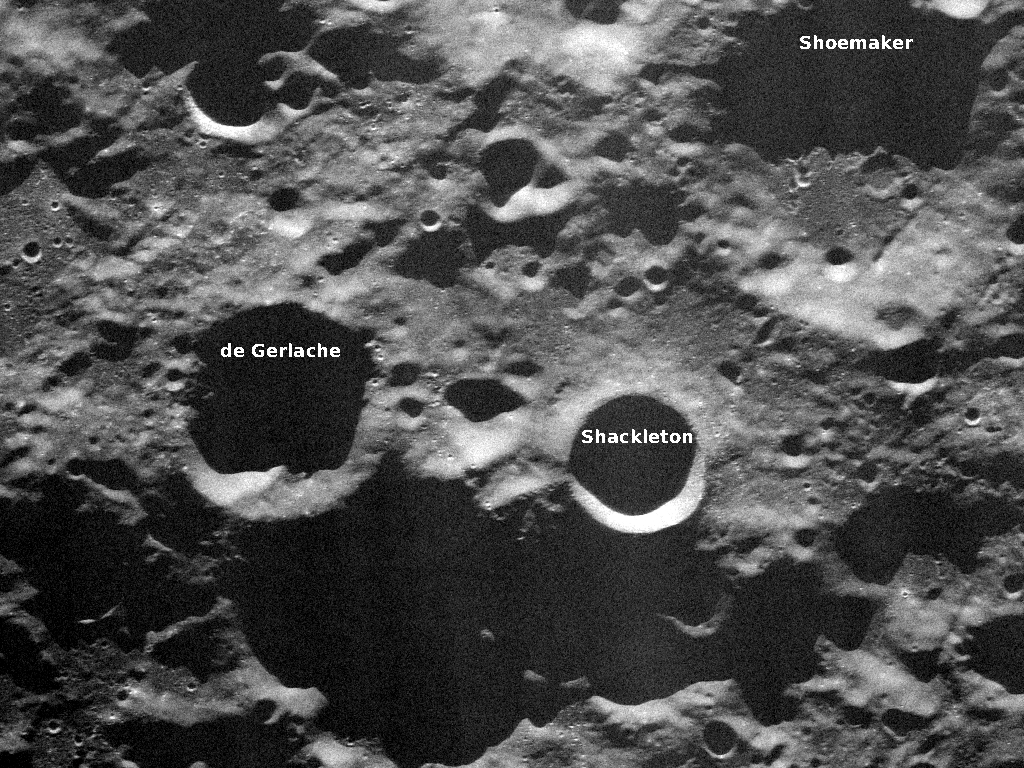
The Moon's Shackleton Crater, as imaged by Earth-based radar

Permanently shadowed regions have a stable surface temperature. On the Moon, the temperature hovers somewhere at or below 50 K (−223.2 °C; −369.7 °F). Another temperatures estimate is 25 to 70 K (−248.2 to −203.2 °C; −414.7 to −333.7 °F). The low temperatures make the regions desirable locations for future infrared telescopes. For comparison: the boiling point of nitrogen at atmospheric pressure is 77.09 K (−196.06 °C; −320.91 °F).

Computer simulations show that powerful solar storms can charge up the soil in permanently shadowed regions near the lunar poles, and may possibly produce "sparks" that could vaporize and melt the soil. There are other unique challenges of such regions: dark environments that restrict the ability of rovers to perceive their surroundings, cryogenic regolith that could be hard to move on, and communication interruptions.

In some cases, peaks of eternal light are located nearby, that could be advantageous for solar power generation. For example, there are two peaks near Shackleton Crater that are illuminated a combined ~94% of a lunar year.

== Utilization ==
A business case analysis indicates that mining of propellants in the craters could become a profitable commercial enterprise.

== Planetary protection ==
In 2020, NASA assigned "sensitive location" status to the Moon's permanently shadowed regions to avoid their contamination. The SETI Institute has a contract to manage planetary protection measures for NASA.

== List ==
Computer renderings of some permanently shadowed regions

The south pole of the Moon

The northern hemisphere of Ceres

Below is an incomplete list of such craters:

The Moon:

- Shackleton
- Shoemaker
- Erlanger
- Sylvester
- Cabeus
- Rozhdestvenskiy
- Malapert
- Marston

Mercury:

- Chao Meng-Fu
- Kandinsky
- Petronius
- Prokofiev
- Tolkien

Ceres:

- Juling

== Research missions ==
=== Past ===
In 2009, LCROSS sent an impactor into a Cabeus crater, that resulted in detection of water in the ejected material.

In 2012, The Lyman Alpha Mapping Project aboard NASA's Lunar Reconnaissance Orbiter has found that the permanently shadowed regions have a porous, powdery surface, that indicates the presence of water ice.

In 2018, an analysis of the results of the Moon Mineralogy Mapper confirmed the existence of water ice deposits in permanently shadowed craters and crevices, with more abundance near the south pole.

In 2022, Lunar Flashlight was launched as a secondary payload for the Hakuto-R Mission 1 mission. The cubesat mission failed to go into orbit around the moon when debris blocked propellant lines for the spacecraft's thrusters.

In 2025, the IM-2 lunar mission, conducted by Intuitive Machines for NASA's CLPS program, landed a Nova-C lunar lander. The lander carried a hopper named Grace, a drone equipped with a neutron spectrometer to explore the permanently shadowed region of the nearby Marston crater. The lander landed on its side and the hopper couldn't be deployed.

=== Current ===
A camera called ShadowCam has been built that is able to take high-resolution images of permanently shadowed regions. It is a NASA instrument that flies on board the Korea Pathfinder Lunar Orbiter (KPLO) since 2022.

=== Planned ===
The proposed International Lunar Observatory mission involves a landing near the Malapert crater.

The Moonraker mission proposed by ESA will, if approved, use a LiDAR instrument to explore and map the permanently shadowed regions of the Moon.

== See also ==
- Cold trap (astronomy)
- List of impact craters in Antarctica
- Peak of eternal light
- Lunar resources
