= Ricco =

Ricco may refer to:

- Ricco (crater), a lunar impact crater
- Ricco (given name), a given name
- Ricco (painter), a Swiss painter
- Ricco (surname), a surname
- Ricco's law, discovered by astronomer Annibale Riccò
- Monte Ricco, a mountain of the Veneto region of Italy
- Mr. Ricco, a 1975 crime drama film directed by Paul Bogart

== See also ==
- Riccò (disambiguation)
