= Lovelace (crater) =

Lunar impact crater

- Coordinates: 82.3°N 106.4°W
- Diameter: 54 km (34 mi)
- Depth: Unknown
- Colongitude: 110° at sunrise
- Eponym: William R. Lovelace II

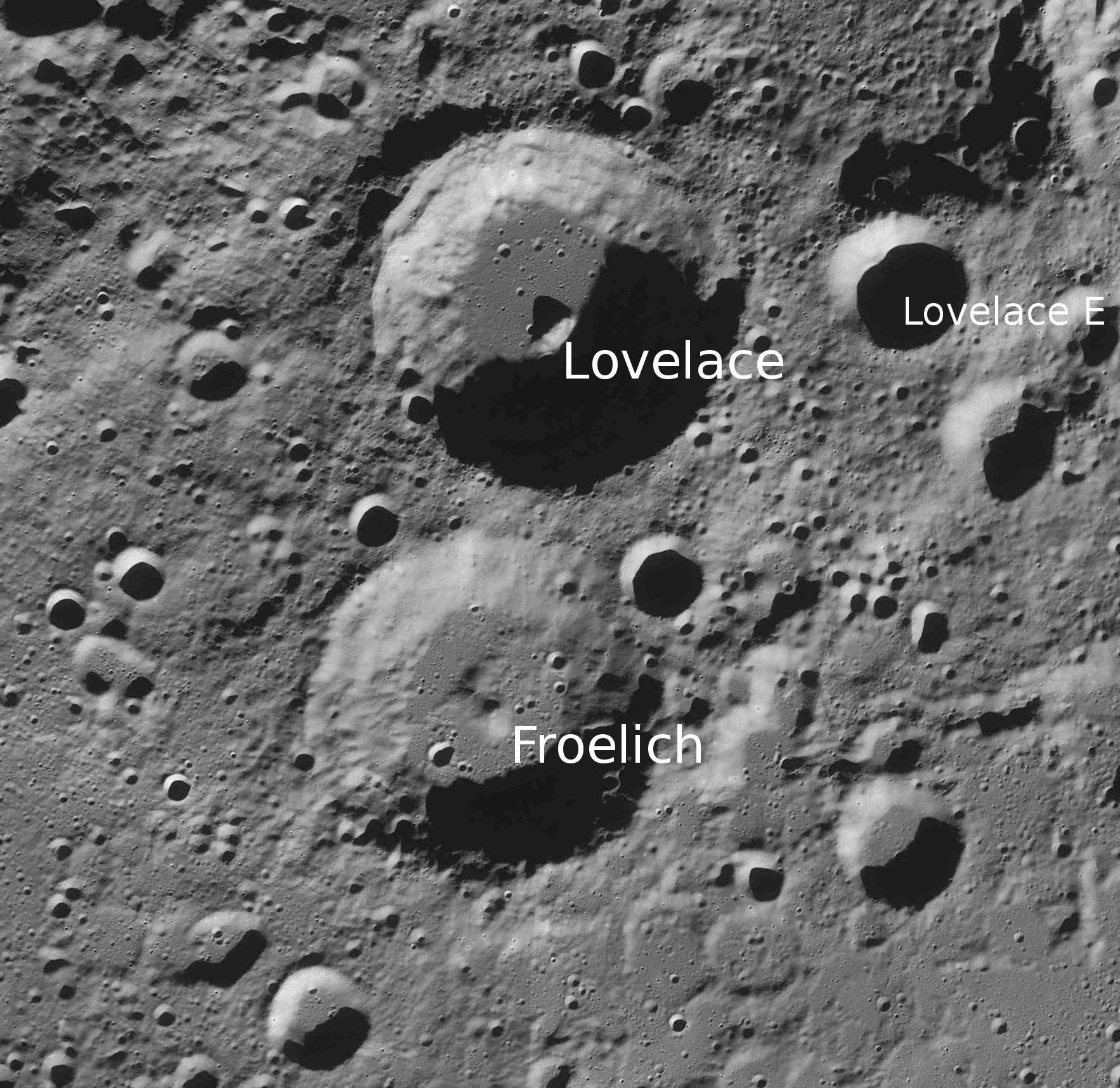
Lovelace Crater with other nearby craters.

Lovelace is a lunar impact crater that is located on the far side of the Moon, just behind the northern limb. It lies to the south-southwest of the crater Hermite, and just to the north of the slightly smaller Froelich. To the east is Sylvester.

The outer wall of this crater is nearly circular, with a well-delineated rim that is not significantly worn. The inner wall is somewhat worn and the features softened and rounded, but is not marked by any small craters of significance. The inner wall is narrower along the northern rim than elsewhere. The interior floor is level, with a central peak that is offset just to the south of the midpoint.

== Satellite craters ==
By convention these features are identified on lunar maps by placing the letter on the side of the crater midpoint that is closest to Lovelace.

Lovelace	Latitude	Longitude	Diameter
E	82.1° N	93.3° W	23 km
