= Tooley (crater) =

Crater on the Moon

- Tooley crater, from Lunar Reconnaissance Orbiter data
- Location: Moon
- Width: 7 km
- Eponym: Craig R Tooley

Tooley Crater is approximately 7 km wide, close to the south pole of the Moon. It is located within a permanently shadowed area of Shoemaker Crater. It is therefore one of the cooler areas of the Moon.

== Description ==
The crater lies within the floor of the larger Shoemaker Crater near the Moon’s south pole, in a permanently shadowed region (PSR).

The diameter is approximately 7 km.

Because of its location, it is among the colder and less‐illuminated areas on the lunar surface, making it of interest forstudies of lunar volatiles and solar wind interactions.

== Naming ==
In January 2021, the International Astronomical Union (IAU) approved the name “Tooley” for the crater, in honor of Craig R. Tooley (1960–2017), a NASA/Goddard engineer and project manager who oversaw the launch and early operations of the Lunar Reconnaissance Orbiter mission.

NASA described it as “a 7 km crater in a permanently shadowed region of Shoemaker Crater… named in his honor.”

== Significance ==
Because Tooley lies within a PSR, it is of particular scientific interest for the study of volatiles and thermal extremes near the lunar poles. Observations from the Lunar Reconnaissance Orbiter (LRO) and, more recently, the Korea Pathfinder Lunar Orbiter’s ShadowCam instrument have provided detailed imaging of this permanently dark region using reflected light from nearby crater rims.

The crater’s low temperatures make it a potential cold trap for ices and other volatiles, similar to other south-polar depressions identified by LRO instruments.

Additionally, the naming reflects the important role of the LRO mission in mapping these high‐latitude regions and identifying targets for future exploration.

== Exploration ==
The region containing Tooley Crater was first imaged in detail by the LROC aboard NASA’s Lunar Reconnaissance Orbiter mission. Because it lies in shadow, imaging relied on indirect illumination to map its interior morphology.

Subsequent observations by ShadowCam have revealed surface textures and slopes within the crater that were previously invisible to optical sensors.

== Namesake Craig R. Tooley ==
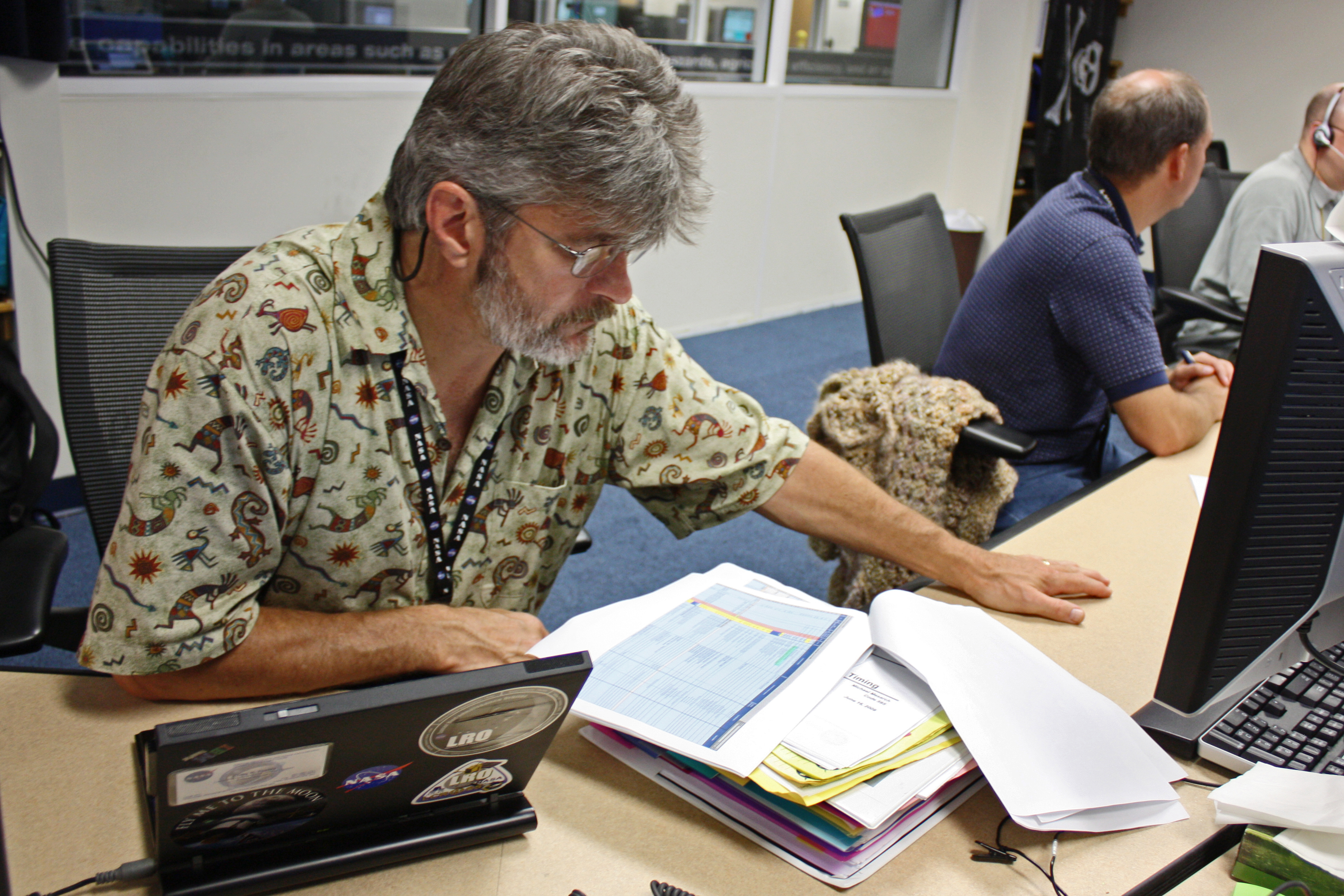
Craig R. Tooley

Craig Richard Tooley (1960 – 2017) was a NASA engineer and project manager at the Goddard Space Flight Center. He served as project manager for the Lunar Reconnaissance Orbiter from development through launch and early operations, and oversaw several Space Shuttle-based Spartan solar missions.

Over a 34-year career, Tooley held numerous leadership roles, including Deputy Director of Goddard’s Applied Engineering and Technology Directorate. He died in 2017 following a battle with pancreatic cancer, and a mission operations room at Goddard was later named in his memory.

== See also ==
- Shoemaker (crater)
- Lunar Reconnaissance Orbiter
- Permanently shadowed region
- List of craters on the Moon
