= Schjellerup (crater) =

Crater on the Moon

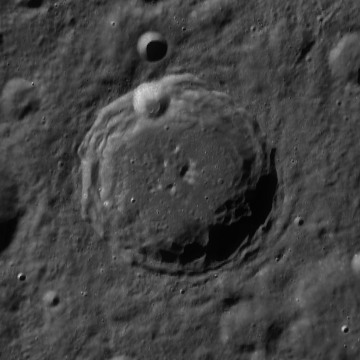
- LRO mosaic
- Coordinates: 69.7°N 157.1°E
- Diameter: 62 km
- Depth: Unknown
- Colongitude: 205° at sunrise
- Eponym: Hans C. F. C. Schjellerup

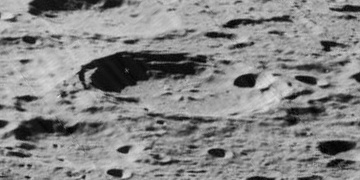
Oblique Lunar Orbiter 5 image, facing west

Schjellerup is a lunar impact crater that is located in the far northern latitudes on the Moon's far side. This crater lies to the southwest of the larger Karpinskiy, and to the northeast of Gamow. To the northwest of Schjellerup is the crater Seares and to the south-southeast lies Avogadro.

This formation dates to the Late Imbrian epoch of the lunar geologic timescale. It is a reasonably well-preserved crater that has undergone only a marginal degree of wear from subsequent impacts. The most notable overlapping impact is a cup-shaped crater along the north-northwestern inner wall. The crater is otherwise free from impacts of note. The rim edge is well-defined and the inner walls have terrace features. The interior floor is relatively level with the exception of some low hills clustered around the midpoint.

== Satellite craters ==
By convention these features are identified on lunar maps by placing the letter on the side of the crater midpoint that is closest to Schjellerup.

| Schjellerup | Latitude | Longitude | Diameter |
|---|---|---|---|
| H | 68.5° N | 167.4° E | 21 km |
| J | 68.1° N | 161.4° E | 37 km |
| N | 66.6° N | 154.3° E | 38 km |
| R | 68.7° N | 152.2° E | 54 km |
