= Ricco (surname) =

Ricco is a surname. Notable people with the surname include:

- Carina Ricco (born 1968), Mexican actress, singer, musician, producer and composer
- Donna Ricco, American fashion designer
- John Ricco (born 1968), American baseball executive
- Louis Ricco (1930–2019), member of the Gambino crime family
- Neil Raymond Ricco (born 1953), American poet and writer

== See also ==
- Ricco (disambiguation)
- Riccò (disambiguation)
