= Erlanger (crater) =

Crater on the Moon

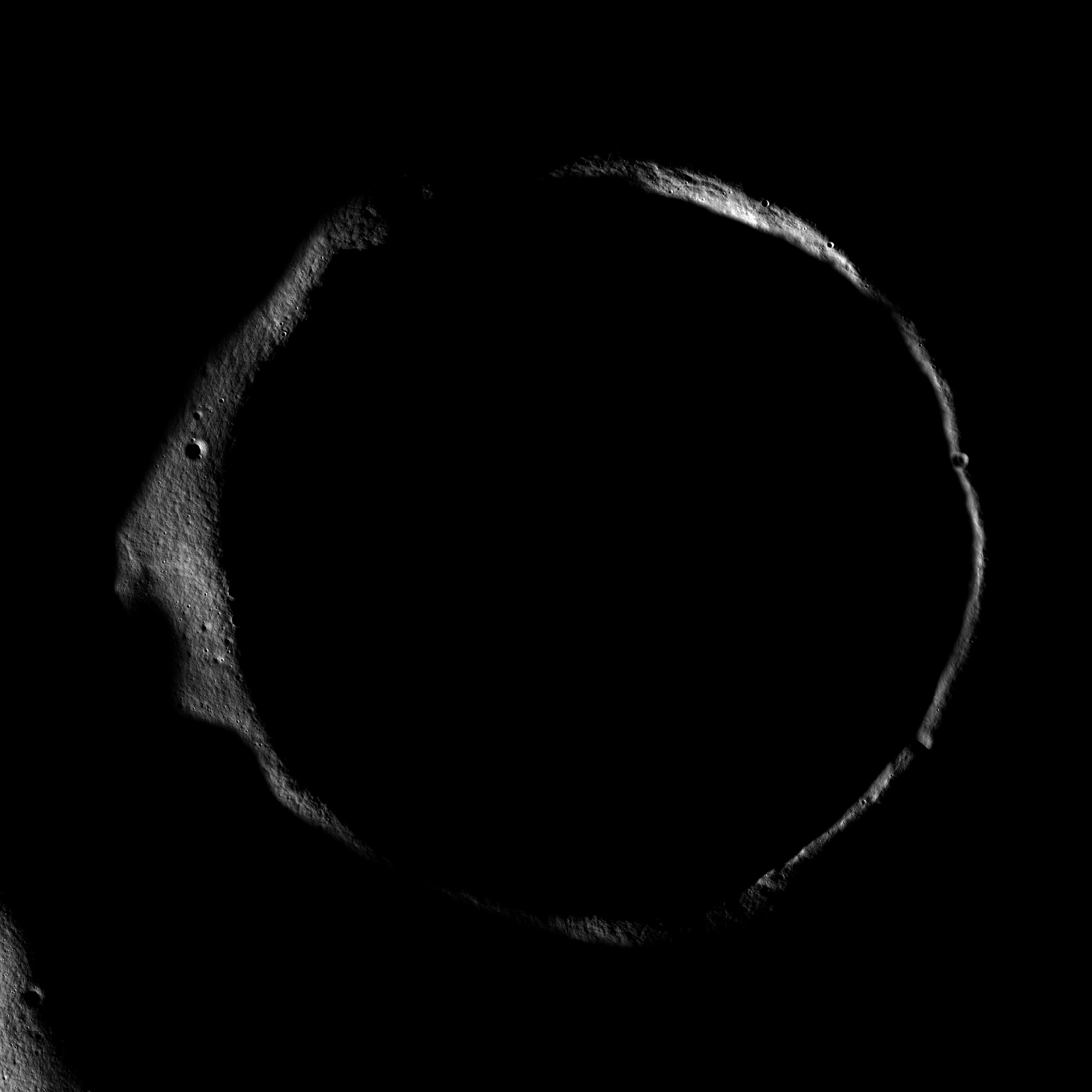
- Erlanger at local sunrise
- Coordinates: 86.94°N 28.62°E
- Diameter: 10.94 km (6.80 mi)
- Depth: 2.17 km (1.35 mi)
- Eponym: Joseph Erlanger

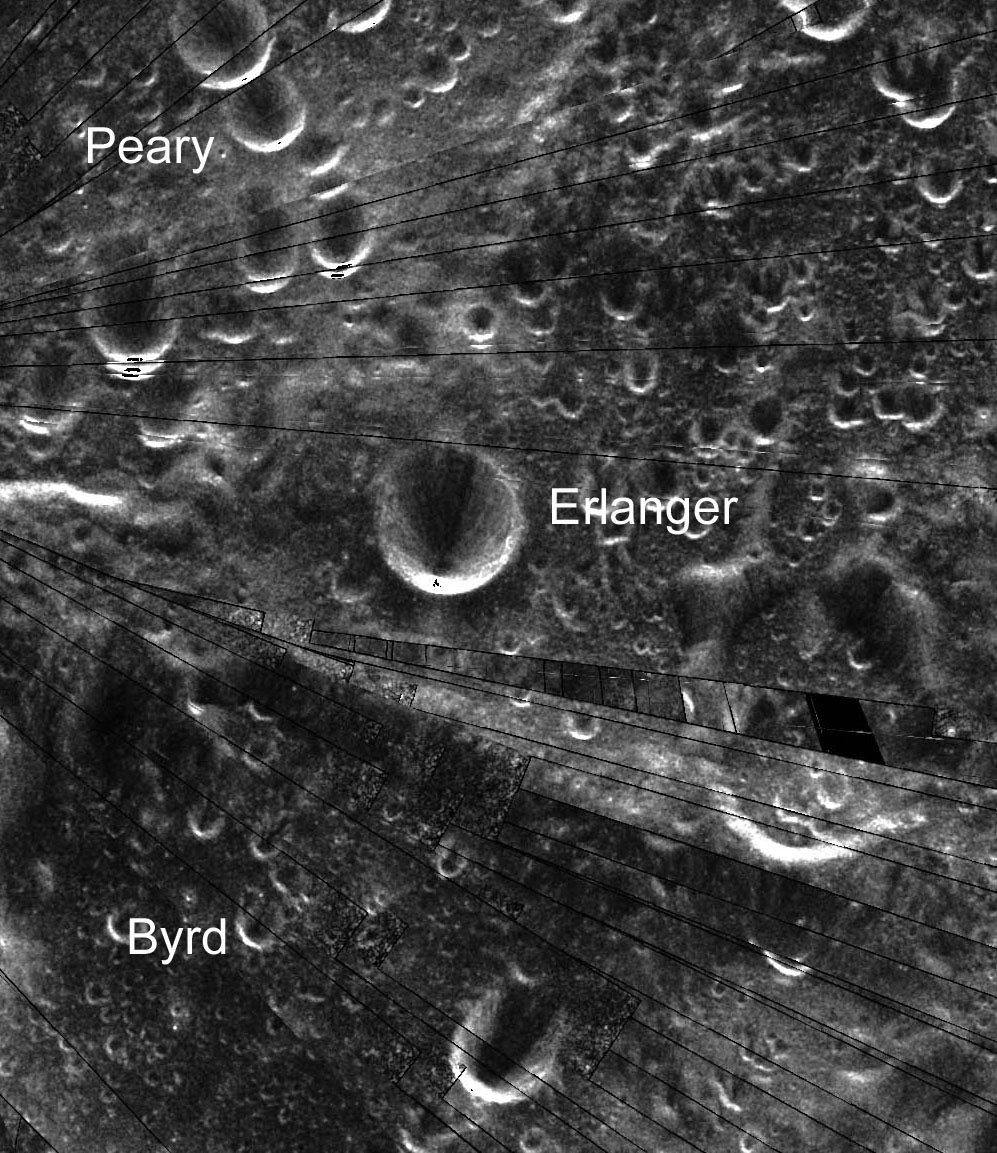
Radar image of Erlanger and surroundings

Erlanger is a very deep lunar impact crater that lies near the north pole of the Moon. Due to its position near the lunar north pole (and given that the Moon's axis is only tilted about 1.5°), sunlight only rarely falls on the bottom, and the 2008 Chandrayaan-1 probe hoped to find that ice from comet impacts had accumulated there. The data appears to indicate the presence of water ice in and around this crater. Erlanger is one of the Moon's permanently shadowed craters.

The crater was named by the International Astronomical Union on January 22, 2009, after the American physiologist and 1944 Nobel Prize winner Joseph Erlanger.
