= RR Centauri =

Star in the constellation Centaurus

- Light curve of RR Cen.

Observation data Epoch J2000 Equinox ICRS
- Constellation: Centaurus
- Right ascension: 14^{h} 16^{m} 57.22^{s}
- Declination: −57° 51′ 15.6″
- Apparent magnitude (V): 7.27 - 7.68

Characteristics
- Spectral type: F0 V
- U−B color index: +0.05
- B−V color index: +0.36
- Variable type: W Uma

Astrometry
Radial velocity (R_{v})	-16.0 km/s
Proper motion (μ)	RA: -52.00 mas/yr Dec.: -22.63 mas/yr
Parallax (π)	10.16±0.61 mas
Distance	320 ± 20 ly (98 ± 6 pc)
Absolute magnitude (M_{V})	+1.882

Orbit
Primary	RR Cen A
Name	RR Cen B
Period (P)	0.60569 days
Semi-major axis (a)	3.92 ± 0.19 R_{☉}
Eccentricity (e)	0
Inclination (i)	81.00 ± 0.44°

Details

RR Cen A
Mass	1.82 ± 0.26 M_{☉}
Radius	2.1 ± 0.01 R_{☉}
Luminosity	8.89 L_{☉}
Temperature	6,912 K

RR Cen B
Mass	0.38 ± 0.06 M_{☉}
Radius	1.05 ± 0.03 R_{☉}
Luminosity	2.2 L_{☉}
Temperature	6,891 ± 13 K

Other designations
- RR Cen, 2MASS J14165721-5751156, HD 124689, HIP 69779, SAO 241587, TYC 8686-210-1, Cordoba Durchmusterung CD-57 5498

Database references
SIMBAD	data

RR Centauri is a variable star with an apparent magnitude of +7.3 when it is at its brightest. It is located in the constellation of Centaurus, approximately 320 light years distant from the Solar System.

The system is a contact binary of the W UMa type - two stars in physical contact whose two components share a gaseous envelope — with a variation in brightness of 0.41 magnitude. Its spectral type is A9V or F0V. The binary nature of the star was discovered in 1896 by the Scottish-South African astronomer Alexander Roberts, so the system has been well observed for over a century. The primary component has a mass of 1.82 solar masses, an effective temperature of around 6900 K, and a radius somewhat larger than twice the solar radius. The secondary component is 0.39 solar masses, giving a mass ratio of the system (q) of 0.210. the secondary has a temperature of about 6890 K and a radius is almost equal to the solar radius.

The orbital period of this system is 0.6057 days (14.54 h). Calculations by astronomers from the Chinese Academy of Sciences show a possible cyclic variation in orbital period over 65.1±0.4 years whose amplitude is 0.0124±0.0007 d. The origin of this periodic variation could be due to the gravitational influence of a third object yet observed. Superimposed on this variation seems to be a secular increase in the period of 1.21×10^{−7} d/a, suggesting that there is transfer of stellar mass from secondary to primary component. If this increase is confirmed, RR Centauri may evolve into a single rapidly rotating star.
