= Isaac Roberts' Observatory =

Coordinates: 51°3′7″N 0°0′37″E

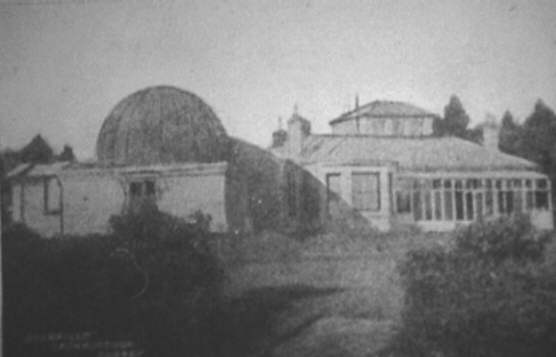
The observatory

Isaac Roberts' Observatory was an observatory, installed in the private home of the British astronomer Isaac Roberts. It was in Crowborough, Sussex, and was active from 1890, when Roberts installed it, until his death in 1904. The observatory appears in the List of observatory codes of the Minor Planet Center with the code 001.

== History ==
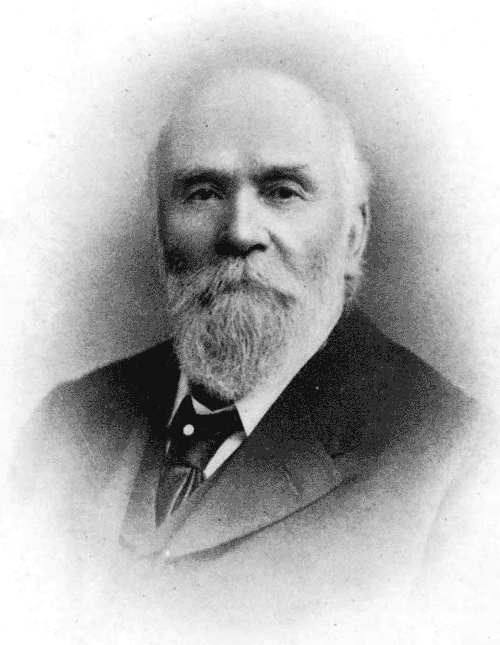
The astronomer Isaac Roberts.

Roberts began his astronomical observations in 1878, and early on saw the need to have the best observation conditions to make photographic records. This factor, coupled with his chronic bronchitis, which meant he needed a better climate for his health, motivated him to look for a new location suitable for his observations. In 1885 he acquired copy of Observations upon the Topography and Climate of Crowborough Hill, Sussex by Charles L. Prince, describing and extolling the conditions of the area, precisely those he needed. The local landowner sold to Roberts part of his property, four acres (1.6 hectares), where he built his house including a domed observatory to accommodate his telescopes. In 1890 Roberts, who called the house Starfield, moved in. In his new house and observatory he continued his work—which earned him, among others awards, the Gold Medal of the Royal Astronomical Society of London—until his death in 1904.

After his death the house changed hands several times until, in 1928, it was bought by local government and turned into offices. In 1935 the offices were extended resulting in the disappearance of the dome of the observatory. Finally in the 1980s, due to needs of local government outstripping the property, the house was sold and demolished to build new houses. The new neighbourhood is called Starfield.

== Description ==
The observatory was situated in the summit of Crowborough Hill, a hill of roughly 250 m above sea level, the highest point of the surrounding region. The buildings were designed to allow that the telescopes could go down until the 20° above the horizon when they focused above the roofs of the house. Joined to the observatory there were some buildings devoted to a photographic laboratory, with darkroom and facilities for the enhancement of photography. The observatory was connected with the house by a corridor that opened into the library.

The dome of the observatory was hemispherical, built of wood with copper facing on the outside. There were two apertures of about 120 cm each, closed with doors that split in the middle, the lower half gliding horizontally into the base of the dome and the upper half rotating on the dome.

== Instrumentation ==
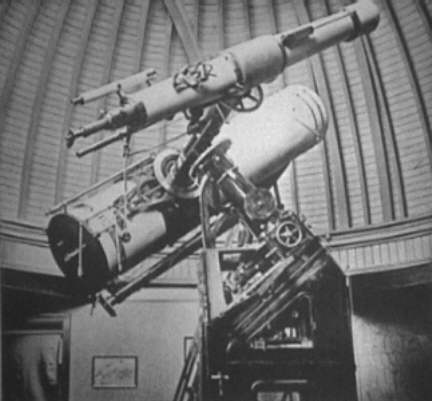
Telescopes of 20 and 7 inches of the Observatory of Isaac Roberts, in Crowborough, Sussex, United Kingdom.

In the observatory were housed two telescopes, a refractor of 7 inches (178 mm) diameter (19 inch (488 mm) focal distance) made by Cooke, purchased by Roberts in 1878; and a 20 inch reflector (98 inch (2,489 mm) focal distance), manufactured by Grubb and bought in 1886. Roberts went in contact with the astronomer William Huggins the one who had the mount of the reflector of 20 inches in the axis of declination of the refractor of 7 inches in place of his counterweight. This way both telescopes had independent movement in declination whereas the clockwork mount, which maintained right ascension, was common for both.

== See also ==
- Astrophotography

== Bibliography ==
- James, Stephen H. G. (June 1996). "Dr Isaac Roberts (1829-1904) and his observatories". Journal of the British Astronomical Association 103 (3): 120–122. Bibcode:1993JBAA..103..120J. Consulted on 12 October 2010.
- Katz, Robert (December 1997). "The Isaac Roberts telescope". Journal of the British Astronomical Association. 107 (6). British Astronomical Association: 345. Bibcode:1997JBAA..107..345.
- Roberts, Isaac (January 1891). "Isaac Roberts' New Observatory on Crowborough Hill, Sussex". Monthly Notices of the Royal Astronomical Society 51: 118. Bibcode:1891MNRAS..51..118R. Consulted on 11 October 2010.
- Roberts, Isaac (June 1905). Proceedings of the Royal Society of London. Vol. 75. London: Harrison and Sons. pp. 356–363.
