= Plaskett (crater) =

Crater on the Moon

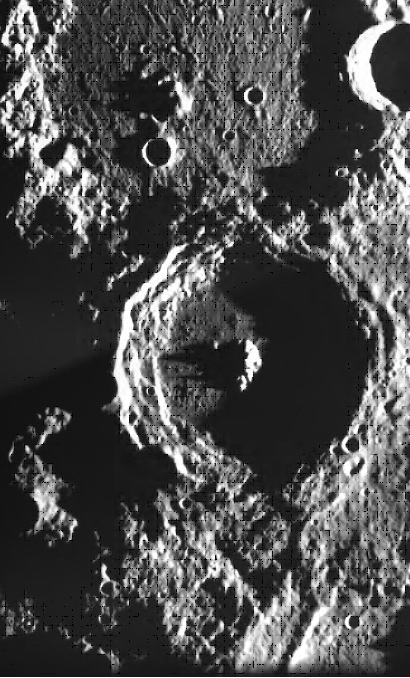
- Plaskett (centre) as imaged by SMART-1
- Coordinates: 82.1°N 174.3°E
- Diameter: 109 km
- Depth: Unknown
- Colongitude: 170° at sunrise
- Eponym: John S. Plaskett

Plaskett is a prominent lunar impact crater that is located on the Northern Hemisphere on the far side of the Moon. It lies only a few hundred kilometers south of the lunar north pole, and the sunlight it receives is at a low angle. The large walled plain named Rozhdestvenskiy is attached to the northeast rim of Plaskett, between the crater and the pole. To the south is the overlapping crater pair of Milankovic and Ricco.

The outer rim of Plaskett has a somewhat polygonal shape formed from outward bulges in the perimeter. The inner wall is terraced along the southern edge, while the remainder is rougher and less finely featured. The interior floor is relatively flat and there is a central peak formed of a double-mount at the midpoint. The infrared spectrum of pure crystalline plagioclase has been identified on the central peak. The satellite crater Plaskett U is attached to the northwest rim.

Because of the isolation of this crater and its location near the lunar limb, it has been suggested as the ideal spot for a future lunar base. A base here would allow simulation of a mission to Mars.

== Satellite craters ==
By convention these features are identified on lunar maps by placing the letter on the side of the crater midpoint that is closest to Plaskett.

Plaskett	Latitude	Longitude	Diameter
H	80.2° N	165.1° W	20 km
S	81.6° N	148.7° E	17 km
U	83.0° N	160.2° E	14 km
V	82.5° N	118.5° E	49 km
