= Hans Schjellerup =

Danish astronomer

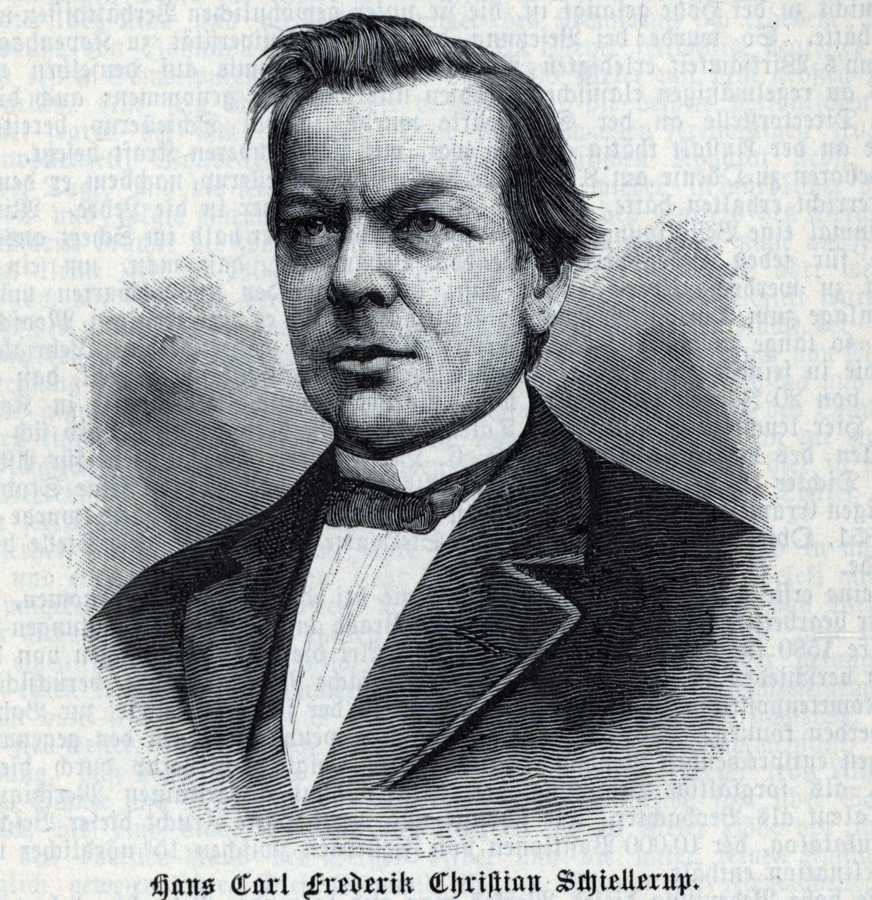
Hans Schjellerup Portrait

Hans Carl Frederik Christian Schjellerup (8 February 1827 – 13 November 1887) was a Danish astronomer.

He was born at Odense, the son of a jeweller. Initially he was apprenticed as a watch maker, but in 1848 he passed the entrance exam for the Polytechnic School of Copenhagen. He graduated by passing an examination in applied mathematics and mechanics.

In 1851 he became an observer at the University Observatory in Copenhagen. He soon became an instructor at the Polytechnic School, then in 1854 a Professor of Mathematics at the Denmark Naval Academy. In 1866, after the new observatory had been completed, Schjellerup assembled a catalog of red stars. He also began a study of Arabic, Chinese and other oriental languages, and used his knowledge to study old astronomic records, including those of ʿAbd al-Raḥmān al-Ṣūfī (whose Book of Fixed Stars he translated into French in 1874) and Chinese records of eclipses. In 1869, he drafted a proposal for a Chinese telegraph dictionary, with each of 5,454 characters being assigned a number. He became an associate of the British Royal Astronomical Society in 1879.

At the University of Copenhagen he became director of the observatory, serving in that capacity up until his death, following a lengthy illness. The crater Schjellerup on the Moon is named after him.
