= Moonraker (lunar orbiter) =

Proposed lunar LiDAR mapping mission

- Mission type: Exploration of the Moon
- Operator: ESA
- Mission duration: 3 years (expected)

Spacecraft properties
- Bus: DAUNTLESS-L
- Manufacturer: NUVIEW GmbH, SFL Missions, German Aerospace Center DLR
- Launch mass: 478 kg
- Dry mass: 259 kg
- Payload mass: 51.2 kg
- Dimensions: 1.35 × 1.10 × 1.39 m (stowed); 1.35 × 1.10 × 5.49 m (deployed)
- Power: 697 W (end-of-life peak power generation)

Start of mission
- Launch date: NET 2028

Orbital parameters
- Regime: Polar orbit
- Altitude: 50 km (mean)

Moonraker is a proposed space mission under development by the European Space Agency (ESA). If approved, it will place a small satellite equipped with a LiDAR instrument into a polar orbit around the Moon. Its measurements will be used to generate highly accurate elevation models of the lunar surface, intended to guide the selection of landing sites for future lunar lander missions. It will also explore permanently shadowed craters and other regions of scientific interest.

== Project history ==
The "pre-Phase A" preparatory study, conducted by NUVIEW GmbH for ESA, began in November 2024. In July 2026, the Luxembourg-based Lunar Outpost Europe joined the Moonraker consortium, developing thermal management systems for the orbiter.

== Spacecraft ==
The Moonraker spacecraft will be based on the DAUNTLESS-L platform, derived from the DAUNTLESS small satellite platform by the company SFL Missions. The spacecraft will be 3-axis stabilized using reaction wheels and cold gas reaction control thrusters. Its primary propulsion will be provided by monopropellant thrusters. Power will be generated by two deployable solar arrays.

== Instruments ==
The near-infrared LiDAR payload, developed by NUVIEW GmbH, will have two objectives:

- Wide-area LiDAR will cover both polar regions of the Moon (~5 million km^{2})
- High-definition LiDAR will cover individual candidate landing sites

Preliminary LiDAR specifications
Mass	51.2 kg
Average Power	251.1 W
Peak Power	486.4 W
Duty Cycle per Orbit	30%
1× Zoom Cell Size	4 m
8× Zoom Cell Size	0.5 m
Points per Cell	2
1× Zoom Swath Width × Length	1 × 3275 km
8× Zoom Swath Width × Length	425 × 425 m

== See also ==
- List of European Space Agency programmes and missions
