= Frederick Hanley Seares =

American astronomer

Frederick Hanley Seares (May 17, 1873 – July 20, 1964) was an American astronomer. He worked at Mount Wilson Observatory and won the Bruce Medal in 1940.

Seares was born in Michigan in 1873 and grew up in Iowa and southern California. He earned his Bachelor of Science degree at the University of California and later studied in Paris and Berlin. Later Seares taught and researched comets and variable stars for eight years at the University of Missouri in Columbia, Missouri (where Harlow Shapley studied under him). In 1909, Seares joined the Mount Wilson Observatory, where he remained for 36 years, 15 of them as assistant director.

Seares was elected to the American Philosophical Society in 1917 and the United States National Academy of Sciences in 1919. He served as president of the Astronomical Society of the Pacific in 1929.

Seares used astrophotography as part of Jacobus Kapteyn's effort to uncover the structure of the sidereal universe through research of "selected areas." Seares standardized the stellar magnitude system and extended it beyond the 18th magnitude, using absorbing wire gauze screens and reduced apertures to compare stars of varying brightnesses. Seares also made contributions to the measurement and interpretation of stellar color indices and wrote on the brightness of the Milky Way compared to spiral nebulae, which were hypothesized (but not yet fully established) to be other galaxies.

Seares also studied interstellar absorption and reddening of starlight.

Seares died in 1964. The crater Seares on the Moon is named after him.
