= Craig R Tooley =

American engineer and NASA project manager (1960–2017)

Craig R. Tooley
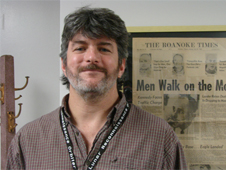
- Craig R. Tooley (NASA / Goddard Space Flight Center)
- Born: 1960; Dallas, Texas, U.S.
- Died: 2017 (aged 56–57); Greenbelt, Maryland, U.S.
- Education: University of Evansville (B.S., Mechanical Engineering)
- Occupations: Engineer, NASA project manager
- Employer: NASA Goddard Space Flight Center
- Known for: Lunar Reconnaissance Orbiter, Magnetospheric Multiscale Mission, Spartan solar missions

Craig Richard Tooley (1960 – 2017) was an American engineer and project manager at the NASA Goddard Space Flight Center. He served as project manager for the Lunar Reconnaissance Orbiter (LRO) mission and as mission manager for the Magnetospheric Multiscale Mission (MMS), in addition to earlier work on Space Shuttle–based Spartan solar missions. In 2021, the International Astronomical Union named the Tooley crater near the Moon’s south pole in his honor.

== Early life and education ==
Tooley was born in Dallas, Texas, and grew up in Texas, Colorado, and Indiana. He earned a degree in mechanical engineering from the University of Evansville.

== Career ==
Tooley joined NASA’s Goddard Space Flight Center in 1983 and worked there for over three decades. He served as project manager for the Lunar Reconnaissance Orbiter (LRO) mission, overseeing spacecraft development, launch, and early operations.

Earlier in his career, he led or contributed to five Spartan solar physics missions that flew aboard the Space Shuttle—STS-56, -64, -69, -87, and -95.

He later served as mission manager for the Magnetospheric Multiscale Mission (MMS), which launched in March 2015 to study magnetic reconnection in Earth's magnetosphere using four identically instrumented spacecraft flying in formation. As MMS mission manager, Tooley oversaw integration and launch operations and led development of modular avionics systems for small missions. He also participated in NASA briefings on MMS science objectives and mission design.

Tooley later became Deputy Director of Goddard’s Applied Engineering and Technology Directorate, where he championed technology development and small-satellite innovation.

== Legacy ==
Tooley passed away in 2017 after a battle with pancreatic cancer. Following his death, the Goddard Space Flight Center named a mission operations room in his honor. In January 2021, NASA announced that the International Astronomical Union had approved the name Tooley for a 7 km-wide lunar crater located within a permanently shadowed region of Shoemaker Crater. His contributions to LRO, MMS, and small-mission avionics continue to be cited in NASA publications and heliophysics research.
