= Ricco (given name) =

Ricco is a given name. Notable people with the name include:

- Ricco Barrino
- Ricco Diack
- Ricco Fajardo
- Ricco Groß
- Ricco Nigel Milus
- Ricco Rodriguez
- Ricco Ross
- Ricco Shlaimoun
- Ricco Wassmer, born Erich Wassmer, known simply Ricco (1915–1972), Swiss painter
- Ricco van Prooijen, Dutch bridge player

== See also ==
- Ricco (disambiguation)
