= Isaac Roberts =

Welsh astronomer

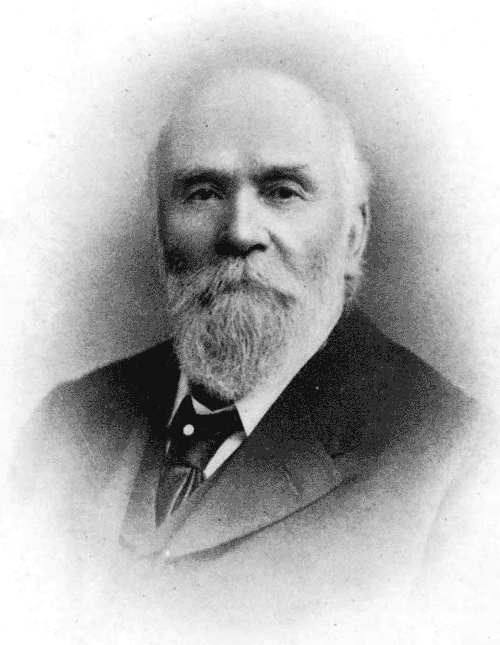
Isaac Roberts

Isaac Roberts FRS (27 January 1829 – 17 July 1904) was a Welsh engineer and businessman best known for his work as an amateur astronomer, pioneering the field of astrophotography of nebulae. He was a member of the Liverpool Astronomical Society in England and was a fellow of the Royal Geological Society. Roberts was also awarded the Gold Medal of the Royal Astronomical Society in 1895.

== Biography ==
Roberts was born at Groes Bach, Henllan, Denbighshire, to William Roberts, a farmer, and his wife Catherine Roberts, née Williams, in January 1829. (Note: Isaac Roberts' baptism record gives his date of birth as 21 January, 1829. On his gravestone, it is 27 January, 1829. He was baptised on 30 January, 1829.) Although he spent some years of his childhood there, he later moved to Liverpool. There, he became an apprentice to John Johnson & Son (which later became Johnson and Robinson), a firm of mechanical engineers, for 7 years beginning on 12 November 1844. He became a partner in 1847, and supplemented his job with night school. When Peter Robinson died in 1855, Roberts was made manager of the firm. When the other partner, John Johnson, died, Roberts was in charge of the contracts and affairs of the firm. Roberts began working as a builder in 1859, and was joined by Peter Robinson's son, J. J. Robinson, in 1862. He was very successful, and became known as one of the best engineers in the region.

Roberts was an International Member of the American Philosophical Society.

Roberts married his first wife, Ellen Anne (Minnie) Cartmel (1852–1901), daughter of Anthony Cartmel, a boat builder, and his wife Ann, on 22 July 1875, at St Thomas, Lydiate, then in Lancashire. Ellen Anne Roberts was buried in Liverpool on 30 March 1901. Her address was listed as Kennessee House, Maghull. Roberts married astronomer Dr Dorothea Klumpke (1861–1942) in October 1901. They had met in 1896 at Vadsø in Norway while both were there to observe the total eclipse of the sun. Klumpke worked at the Paris Observatory.

He became agnostic in his religious views.

Roberts died suddenly in Crowborough, Sussex, England in 1904, aged 75, widowing his second wife Dorothea Klumpke. He was cremated soon after his death, and his ashes lay in Crowborough for about five years before he was reburied in Flaybrick Hill Cemetery, in Birkenhead. Roberts was patriotic to his home land of Wales, and continued to use the Welsh language throughout his life. He left a substantial amount of money to Cardiff University, Bangor University, and University of Liverpool. His epitaph reads:

"In memory of Isaac Roberts, Fellow of the Royal Society, one of England's pioneers in the domain of Celestial Photography. Born at Groes, near Denbigh, 27 January 1829, died at Starfield, Crowborough, Sussex, 17 July 1904, who spent his whole life in the search after Truth, and the endeavour to add to the happiness of others. This stone is erected in loving devotion by his widow Dorothea Roberts née Klumpke."

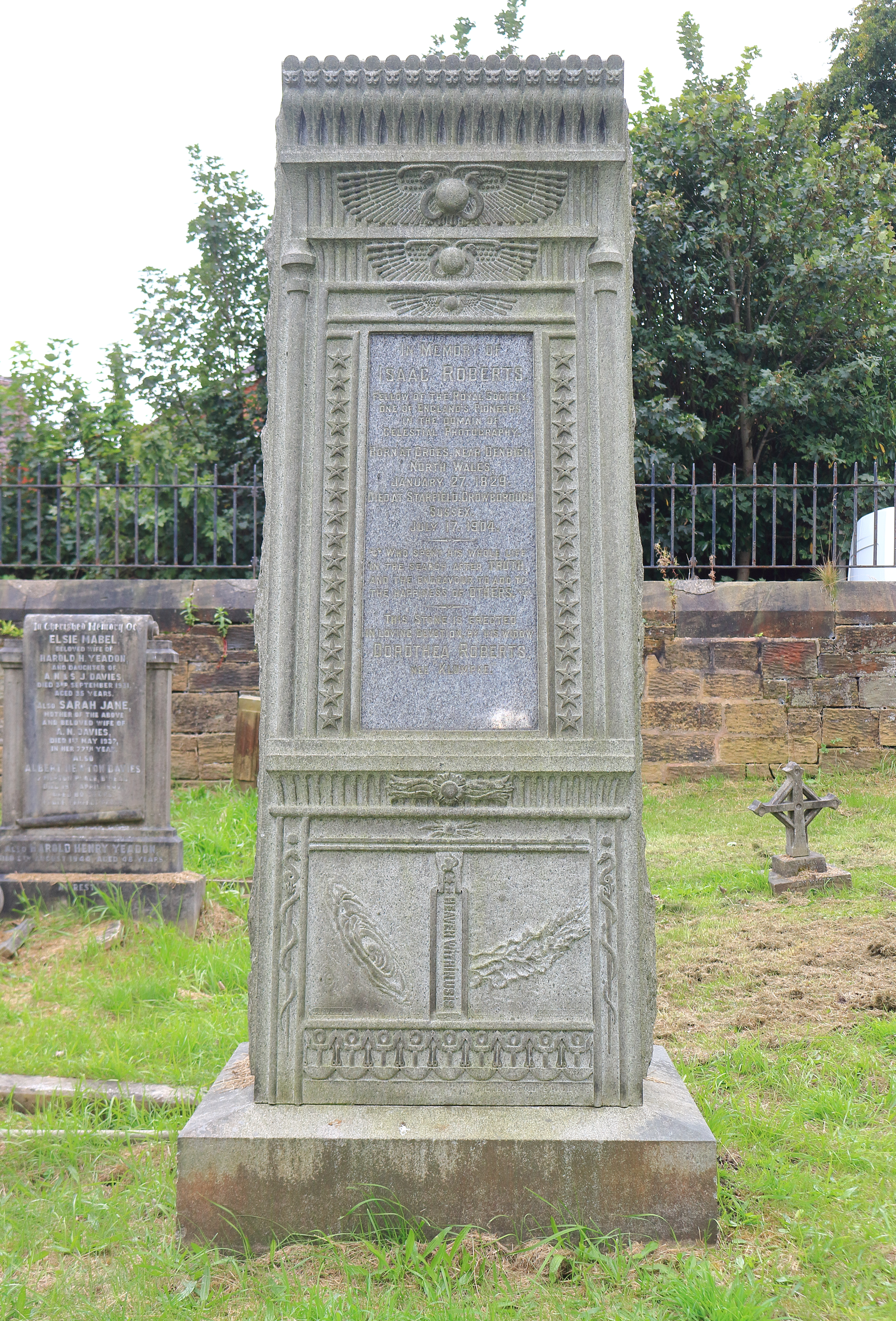
Roberts's tomb in Flaybrick Memorial Gardens

Through a donation of his wife Dorothea in honor of her late husband, the Société astronomique de France (the French Astronomical Society) established the Prix Dorothea Klumpke-Isaac Roberts for the encouragement of the study of the wide and diffuse nebulae of William Herschel, the obscure objects of Barnard, or the cosmic clouds of R.P. Hagen. This biennial prize was first given in 1931 and continues today.

The crater Roberts on the far side of the Moon was named to jointly honour Isaac Roberts and the South African astronomer Alexander William Roberts.

== Interest in astronomy ==
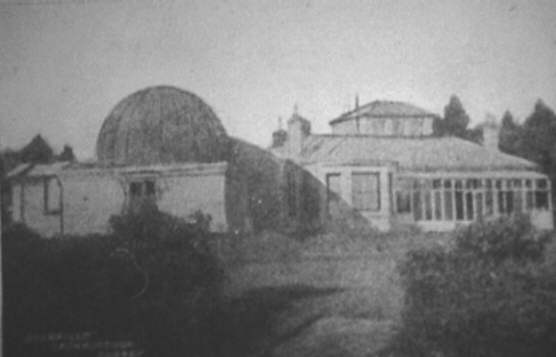
Starfield: Isaac Roberts's observatory and home in Crowborough, Sussex

In 1878, Roberts had a 7-inch (180 mm) refractor at his home in Rock Ferry, Birkenhead. Although at the time he used this for visual observation, he began to explore stellar photography, his forte, a few years later. In 1883, Roberts began experimenting with astrophotography. He first used portrait lenses with apertures varying from 3/8 to 8 in (10 to 203 mm). Roberts was pleased with the results, and ordered a reflecting telescope with a silver-on-glass mirror of 20-inch (510 mm) diameter (100 in or 2,500 mm focal length) from the Grubb Telescope Company and by 1885 he had built an observatory building to house it. He mounted photographic plates directly at the prime focus to avoid the loss of light that would occur from using a second mirror. This allowed him to make significant progress in the then-developing field of astrophotography.

In 1886 Roberts displayed his first photographs at the Royal Astronomical Society at Liverpool, of which he was president. These images showed, for the first time, "the vast extensions of nebulosity in the Pleiades and Orion."

=== Advancements ===
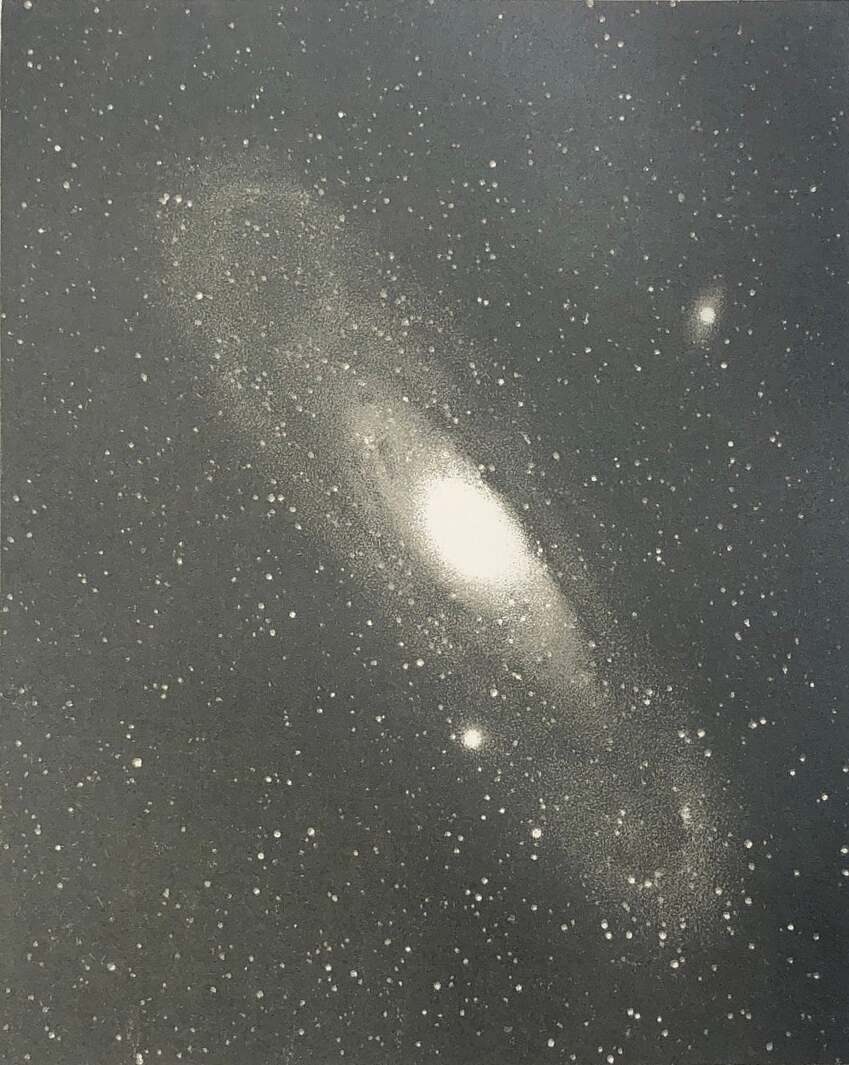
Isaac Roberts' magnum opus is generally considered to be his picture of the Great Nebula in Andromeda, shown in this plate. It was photographed on 29 December 1888.

Astrophotography requires very long exposure times (sometimes an hour or more) to record faint objects on a photographic plate. Long exposure could also record objects invisible to the human eye. Roberts developed a technique of "piggyback" astronomical photography, mounting the camera/lens on a larger equatorial mounted telescope that was used as a "guidescope". The combination kept the camera aimed accurately over the long exposure time as the Earth rotated.

Most consider Roberts' magnum opus to be a photograph showing the structure of M31, the Great Nebula in Andromeda (now known as the Andromeda Galaxy). He made the photo on 29 December 1888, using his 20-inch (510 mm) aperture reflecting telescope made by Grubb. The long exposure photograph revealed that the nebula had a spiral structure, which was quite unexpected at the time. Photographs such as this changed astronomy by revealing the true form of nebulae and clusters, and eventually helped to develop the theories about galaxies. He published his celestial portfolio in a large format book that is the first popular account of celestial photography of the deep sky.

In addition to his considerable advancements in the field of astrophotography, Roberts also invented a machine called the Stellar Pantograver that could engrave stellar positions on copper plates.

The Science Museum in London has Robert's 20-inch (510 mm) reflector.

== See also ==
- Isaac Roberts' Observatory
