= Grignard (crater) =

Crater on the Moon

- Coordinates: 84.4°N 75.6°W
- Diameter: 12.2 km
- Eponym: Victor Grignard

Grignard is a lunar impact crater on the lunar near side near the northern pole. The crater is located Northeast of Sylvester crater (diameter of 58 km) and is directly adjacent to the Hermite crater (diameter of 104 km). The crater was adopted and named after French chemist Victor Grignard by the IAU in 2009.
