= Roberts (crater) =

Crater on the Moon

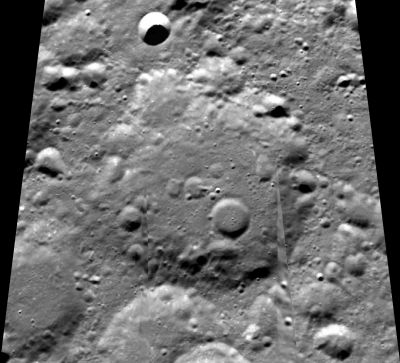
- Clementine mosaic
- Coordinates: 71.1°N 174.5°W
- Diameter: 89 km
- Depth: Unknown
- Colongitude: 177° at sunrise
- Formation: Imbrian or Nectarian
- Eponym: Alexander W. Roberts; Isaac Roberts

Roberts is a degraded lunar impact crater that is located in the far northern latitudes on the far side of the Moon. It is located to the east-southeast of the crater Karpinskiy, and to the northwest of Sommerfeld. To the north is Thiessen.

This formation dates to the Imbrian or Nectarian period on the lunar geologic timescale. It is a heavily worn and eroded crater with a rounded outer rim that is incised and damaged by multiple smaller craters. Little of the original rim still remains besides a rounded and irregular ridge in the surface. The interior floor is also marked by a number of small craters, the most notable being a crater near the south-southeastern inner wall.

== Satellite craters ==
By convention these features are identified on lunar maps by placing the letter on the side of the crater midpoint that is closest to Roberts.

Roberts	Latitude	Longitude	Diameter
M	68.2° N	174.3° W	46 km
N	69.0° N	176.3° W	49 km
P	67.4° N	178.7° E	30 km
Q	68.9° N	177.3° E	19 km
R	69.9° N	178.4° E	59 km
