= Avogadro (crater) =

Crater on the Moon

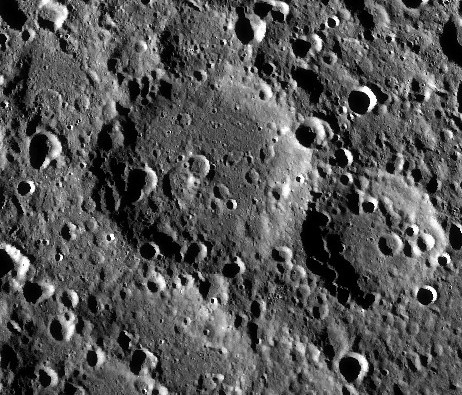
- LRO image
- Coordinates: 63.21°N 165.36°E
- Diameter: 129.84 km (80.68 mi)
- Depth: Unknown
- Colongitude: 170° at sunrise
- Formation: Pre-Nectarian
- Eponym: Amedeo Avogadro

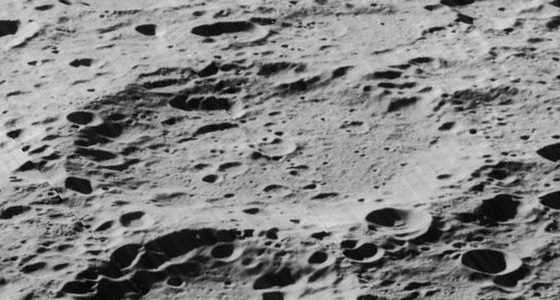
Oblique Lunar Orbiter 5 image, facing west

Avogadro is an ancient lunar impact crater that is located in the northern hemisphere on the far side of the Moon. On the lunar geologic timescale, this formation is dated to the Pre-Nectarian period. The formation has been heavily worn and eroded by subsequent impacts, so that the rim is now little more than a rounded edge surrounding the crater depression. The crater floor is equally worn, being covered in a multitude of smaller craters of various sizes. Many of these smaller craters have also been eroded, leaving little more than a faint trace on the surface.

Nearby craters of note include Tikhov, which is nearly attached to the southeast rim, Oberth to the west, and Schjellerup to the north-northwest. To the south-southwest is the crater Yamamoto, and farther to the south is a large walled plain called D'Alembert.

This crater is named after the Italian scientist Amedeo Avogadro (1776–1856). Its designation was formally adopted by the International Astronomical Union in 1970.

== Satellite craters ==
By convention these features are identified on lunar maps by placing the letter on the side of the crater midpoint that is closest to Avogadro.

Avogadro	Latitude	Longitude	Diameter
D	64.4° N	164.5° E	20 km
