= Riccò =

Riccò may refer to:

- Annibale Riccò, Italian astronomer
- Riccardo Riccò Italian cyclist
- 18462 Riccò an asteroid
- Riccò del Golfo di Spezia

== See also ==
- Ricco (disambiguation)
