= Georg Heinrich Thiessen =

German astronomer

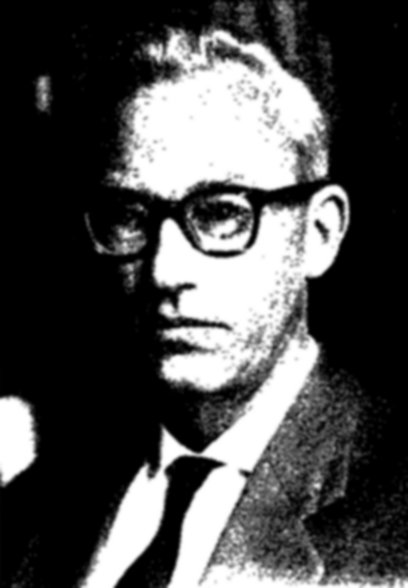

Georg Heinrich Thiessen (19 January 1914 – 3 July 1961) was a German astronomer.

After graduating, Georg Thiessen studied physics and mathematics and received his doctorate in 1940 under Richard Becker at Göttingen Georg August University. He joined the Fraunhofer Institute of the Institute for High Frequency Research in Freiburg, Breisgau in 1943, where he met Karl-Otto Kiepenheuer. In January 1945 he was transferred to the observatory in Hamburg-Bergedorf, where he was employed as assistant and later as 'Observator' from 1946 to 1953. In 1953 he habilitated on the subject of magnetic fields of the sun, he believed in the existence of a global solar magnetic field. He was promoted to professor in 1959.

On 3 of July 1961 he was killed in a frontal collision with a tram, his wife was seriously injured in this accident. A crater on the farside of the moon (Thiessen) has been named after him since 1970.

== Sunspots ==
Thiessen extensively studied sunspots. He discovered that the granulation, filling the entire solar surface outside sunspots, cannot be observed in the umbra. However, his observations revealed that there are small brighter spots (so-called umbra dots) inside the umbra. They are difficult to observe due to their small size and because of the high brightness contrast between the sunspot umbra and the surrounding photosphere.
