= Milankovič (lunar crater) =

Lunar crater

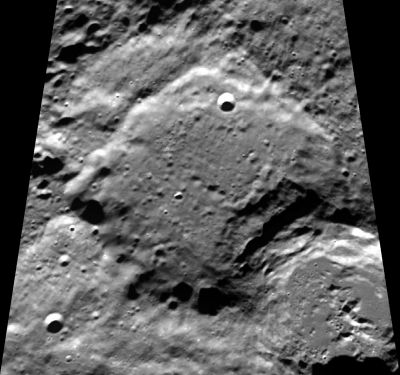
- Clementine mosaic
- Coordinates: 77.2°N 168.8°E
- Diameter: 101 km
- Depth: unknown
- Colongitude: 195° at sunrise
- Eponym: Milutin Milanković

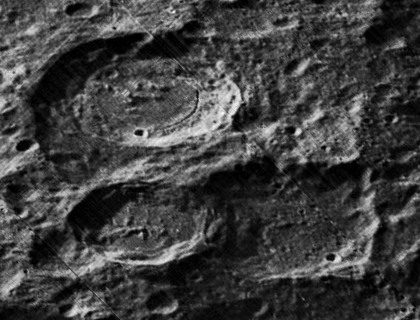
Oblique view of Karpinskiy (upper left), Ricco (lower left), and Milankovič (lower right), from Lunar Orbiter 5

Milankovič is a lunar impact crater that is located in the high northern latitudes on the far side of the Moon. Overlapping the southeastern rim is the smaller but more sharply defined crater Ricco. Just to the south is Karpinskiy, and to the north is the prominent Plaskett.

This is a worn and eroded crater formation with a distorted outer rim. In the northwestern quadrant of the crater interior is what appears to be a double rim. The outer rim is circular in form along this edge but shallow. The inner rim forms a somewhat linear shelf that runs from the north to the west sides. The remainder of rim is rounded and uneven. Within the interior, the outer rampart of Ricco covers the southeastern part of the floor. The rest of floor is relatively level, with only some low hills near the midpoint.

== Satellite craters ==
By convention these features are identified on lunar maps by placing the letter on the side of the crater midpoint that is closest to Milankovič.

Milankovič	Latitude	Longitude	Diameter
E	78.0° N	177.2° W	46 km

== See also ==
- 1605 Milankovitch, minor planet
- Milankovič (Martian crater)
