= Seares (crater) =

Crater on the Moon

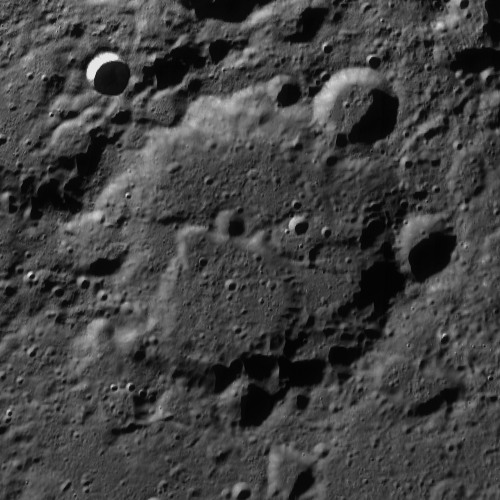
- LRO mosaic
- Coordinates: 73.5°N 145.8°E
- Diameter: 110 km
- Depth: Unknown
- Colongitude: 220° at sunrise
- Eponym: Frederick H. Seares

Seares is a lunar impact crater located in the northern part of the Moon's far side. It lies to the east-northeast of a walled plain called Schwarzschild, and to the west of the prominent crater Karpinskiy.

The rim of this old crater is worn and battered by impacts, and now forms an irregular ring of peaks, valleys and ridges about the interior floor. The satellite crater Seares B lies across the northeastern rim. There are small craters across several other parts of the rim. The northwestern rim and outer rampart of Seares overlies half of an old crater that is nearly as large in radius.

The interior floor is nearly level in places, but is marked by a multitude of tiny craterlets of various dimensions. A series of ridges, grooves, and small craters forms a band across the central part of the floor from west to east.

== Satellite craters ==
By convention these features are identified on lunar maps by placing the letter on the side of the crater midpoint that is closest to Seares.

Seares	Latitude	Longitude	Diameter
B	75.7° N	149.7° E	26 km
Y	77.9° N	139.5° E	37 km
