= Annibale Riccò =

Italian astronomer (1844–1919

- Riccò at the Fourth Conference International Union for Cooperation in Solar Research at Mount Wilson Observatory, 1910
- Born: 14 September 1844; Milan, Italy
- Died: 23 September 1919 (aged 75); Rome, Italy
- Education: University of Modena
- Awards: Janssen Medal (1906)
- Scientific career
- Workplaces: University of Catania

Annibale Riccò (14 September 1844 – 23 September 1919) was an Italian astronomer and in 1919, was elected as the first president of the International Association of Volcanology.

== Biography ==
He was born in Milan, Italy. In 1868 he was awarded a bachelor's degree from the Università di Modena, then an engineering degree from the Politecnico di Milano. Between 1868 and 1877 he worked as an assistant at the Modena Observatory, teaching mathematics and physics at the Università di Modena. He taught at Naples and then Palermo, where he also worked at the observatory.

In 1890 he was named to the chair of astrophysics at the Università di Catania, and became director of the observatory on Mount Etna as well as the first director of the Catania Observatory. Between 1898 and 1900 he was named chancellor of the university.

During his career he performed research into sunspots, and he participated in four solar eclipse expeditions, leading the expeditions in 1905 and 1914. He was president of the Società degli Spettroscopisti Italiani and the Gioenia di Scienze Naturali di Catania. He also served as vice president of the International Astronomical Union. He was appointed president of the volcanology section of the International Union of Geodesy and Geophysics (IUGG) for the period 1919–1922, but died just two months into his elected term.

== Legacy ==
He discovered Ricco's Law, an important principle of vision science. The crater Ricco on the Moon is named after him, as is the asteroid 18462 Ricco. Ricco was also awarded the Janssen Medal in 1906 by the French Academy of Sciences for his work in astrophysics. He was also awarded the Prix Jules Janssen of the Société astronomique de France (French Astronomical Society) in 1914.

He died in Rome, Italy, in September 1919.

== Additional sources ==
- On the History of the Palermo Astronomical Observatory.
- Riccò Annibale biography.
