= Alexander William Roberts =

Scottish-born South African teacher and amateur astronomer

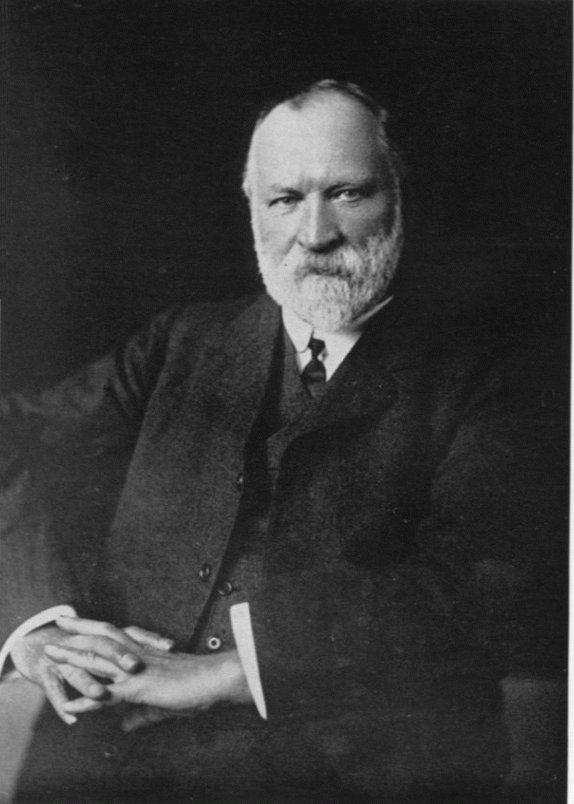
- Alexander William Roberts in 1938
- Born: 4 December 1857; Farr, Sutherland, Scotland
- Died: 21 January 1938 (aged 80); Alice, Eastern Cape, South Africa
- Other name: Roberts of Lovedale
- Education: University of Edinburgh; Free Church College
- Occupations: teacher, astronomer

The Hon. Alexander William Roberts FRSE FRAS FRSSA (4 December 1857 – 21 January 1938) was a Scottish-born, South African teacher and an amateur astronomer. He was an expert on the stars of the southern hemisphere and did much mapping of these stars. He was affectionately known as Roberts of Lovedale.

== Life ==
He was born in Farr, in the county of Sutherland, Scotland. His father, William Henry Roberts, moved to Admiralty House, on Newhaven Road in Leith, north of Edinburgh in his youth. Alexander was educated at St James Free Church School in Leith.

He trained as a teacher at Moray House in Edinburgh and at the Free Church College for Teachers also in Edinburgh. From 1877 until 1881 he served as an assistant teacher at the North School, in Wick, Scotland. In 1881 he returned to Edinburgh to take on an assistant role at the University of Edinburgh.

As a youth he developed an interest in astronomy, but, after applying for a post at the Edinburgh Observatory, was dissuaded from a career by Charles Piazzi Smyth, the Astronomer Royal for Scotland.

He emigrated to South Africa in 1883, where he took a teaching position at the Lovedale Missionary Institution, teaching the native South Africans. (He would later serve as acting Principal at the institute, then Principal at Lovedale Training School). In South Africa he met David Gill who re-inspired his love of astronomy.

In 1894 he was elected a Fellow of the Royal Astronomical Society. In 1898 he was elected a Fellow of the Royal Society of Edinburgh. His proposers for the latter were Ralph Copeland, John McLaren, Lord McLaren, Peter Guthrie Tait and James Burgess. He was awarded an honorary doctorate Doctor of Science from the University of the Cape of Good Hope in 1899. In 1908 he was elected a Fellow of the newly created Royal Society of South Africa.

In South Africa he pursued his interest in astronomy, first measuring the parallax and proper motion of Alpha Centauri and Beta Centauri. He then became a prolific observer of variable stars, particularly those that were members of a binary system. He continued his observations for over 30 years, and pioneered the study of close binary systems. He published over 100 works on these topics. Between 1891 and 1920 he made over 250,000 observations of 98 variable stars.

In 1913 he served as President of the South African Association for the Advancement of Science (SAAAS), and in 1927-1928 as President of the Astronomical Society of South Africa (ASSA).

Much of his work was communicated through Edward C. Pickering, the director of the Harvard College Observatory. However, with the death of Pickering in 1919 he ceased further research. Instead he began to focus on politics and race relations in South Africa, teaching at the South African Native College at Fort Hare.

The Prime Minister Jan Smuts appointed him as a senator to represent the interests of native Africans on the Native Affairs Commission in 1920, which he also chaired. Seen as an able and unbiased mediator he also chaired the commission into the 1920 riots at Port Elizabeth and the 1922 Bondelswarts Rebellion. In 1923 he also chaired the Native Churches Commission.

In 1925, however, he did serve as the South African delegate to the I.A.U. General Assembly.

In 1930 he sat as a Member of the Native Economic Commission.

He died at Alice in South Africa on 21 January 1938.

== Recognition ==
- The crater Roberts on the Moon is co-named for him and Sir Isaac Roberts.
- The asteroid 11781 Alexroberts discovered at the Boyden Observatory in 1966 is named after him.

== Family ==
In 1894 he was married to Elizabeth Dunnett. The couple had three children, two daughters and one son.
