= D'Alembert (crater) =

Lunar impact crater

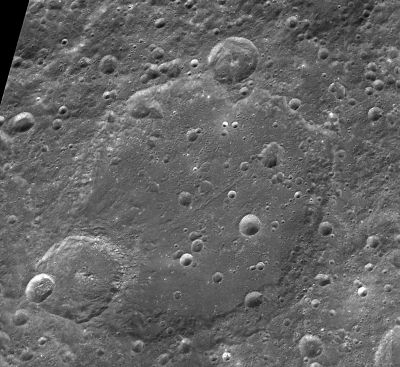
- Clementine mosaic
- Coordinates: 50.8°N 163.9°E
- Diameter: 233.55 km (145.12 mi)
- Depth: Unknown
- Colongitude: 201° at sunrise
- Formation: Nectarian
- Eponym: Jean d'Alembert

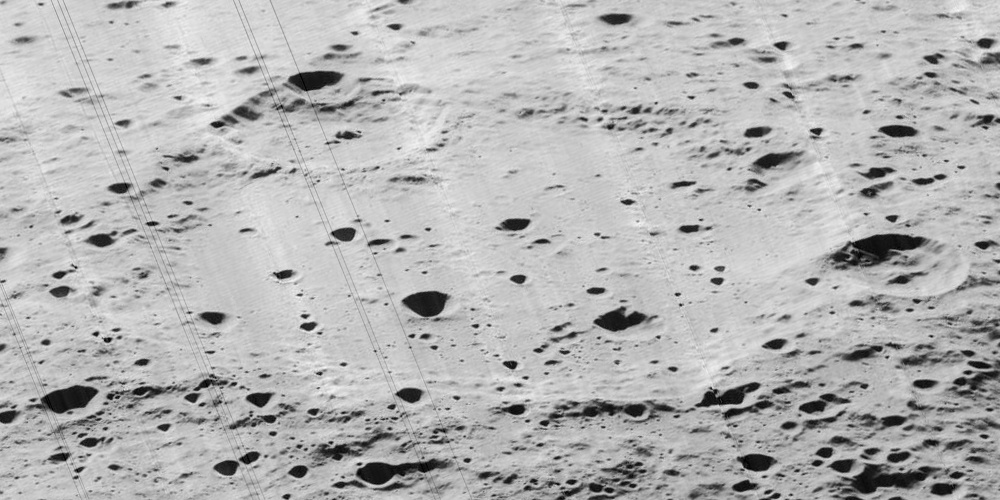
Oblique Lunar Orbiter 5 image, facing west

D'Alembert is a large lunar impact crater located in the northern hemisphere on the far side of the Moon, to the northeast of the somewhat smaller walled plain named Campbell. This class of formation is known as a peak ring basin, which has a single interior topographic ring or a discontinuous ring of peaks with no central peak. Astride the southwest rim of d'Alembert is Slipher. To the north is the crater Yamamoto, and to the south-southwest lies Langevin. This walled plain has the same diameter as Clavius on the near side, making it one of the largest such formations on the Moon.

This formation dates to the Nectarian period of the lunar geologic timescale. As with many lunar walled plains of comparable dimensions, the outer rim of this formation has been worn and battered by subsequent impacts. Besides Slipher, the most notable of these craters is d'Alembert Z intruding into the northern rim. There is also a small crater on the northwest inner wall that has a wide cleft in its eastern side, and a smaller crater along the southeastern inner wall. As eroded as the rim may be, its form can still be readily discerned as a roughly circular ridge line in the lunar terrain.

The interior floor of d'Alembert is a relatively level surface, at least in comparison with the rough terrain that surrounds the crater rim. It is marked with a number of small crater impacts, the largest being d'Alembert G and d'Alembert E toward the eastern rim. In the southwest, the floor is more irregular due to the outer rampart and layers of ejecta from Slipher. A pair of shallow clefts in the floor surface radiate away from this crater, beginning near the midpoint of d'Alembert and reaching half-way toward the inner wall. Crater chains across Rowland, Carnot, Esnault-Pelterie and Schlesinger craters to the east appear to come from d'Alembert. The infrared spectrum of pure crystalline plagioclase has been identified on the south and central floor, as well as the southeast rim.

This crater is named after French mathematician, physicist, and philosopher Jean d'Alembert (1717–1783). Its designation was officially adopted by the International Astronomical Union in 1970.

== Satellite craters ==
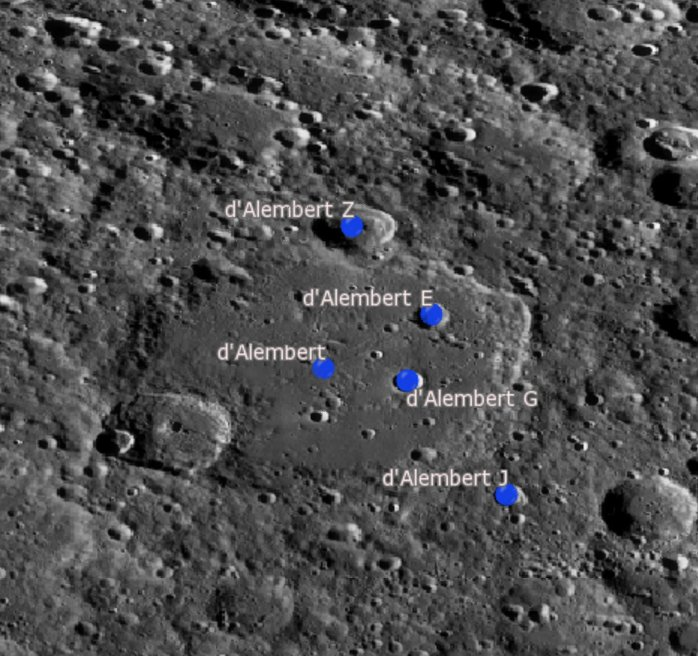
Satellite features of d'Alembert

By convention these features are identified on lunar maps by placing the letter on the side of the crater midpoint that is closest to D'Alembert.

d'Alembert	Latitude	Longitude	Diameter
E	52.8° N	168.2° E	22 km
G	50.9° N	167.5° E	18 km
J	47.5° N	170.4° E	20 km
Z	55.4° N	165.6° E	44 km

D'Alembert G is characterised by an extremely high rockfall density by lunar standards.
