= Petronius (crater) =

Crater on Mercury

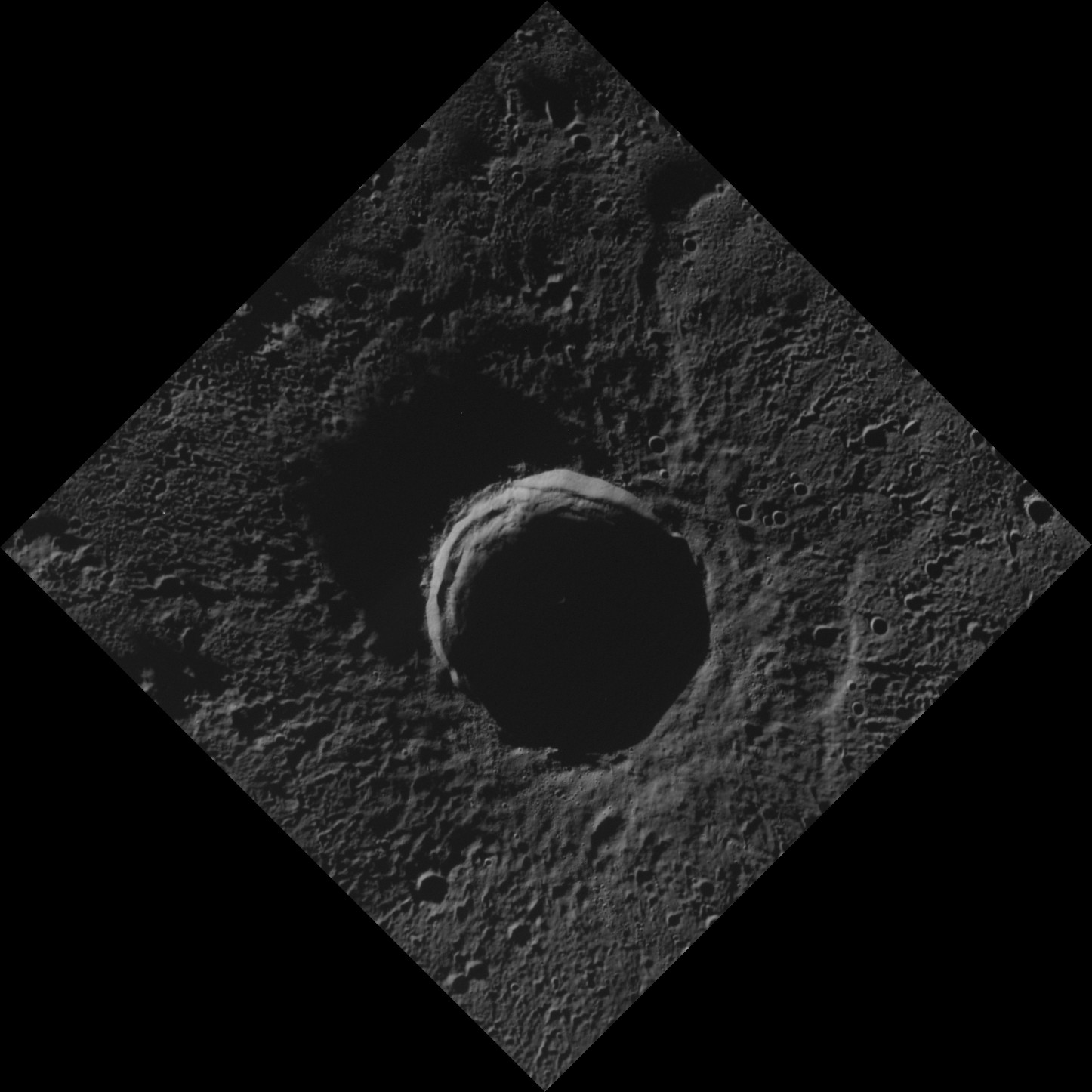
- MESSENGER WAC
- Planet: Mercury
- Coordinates: 86.06°N 40.51°W
- Quadrangle: Borealis
- Diameter: 36 km (22 mi)
- Eponym: Petronius

Petronius is a crater on Mercury. It has a diameter of 36 kilometres (22 miles). Its name was adopted by the International Astronomical Union (IAU) on the August 6, 2012. Petronius is named for the Roman author Petronius.

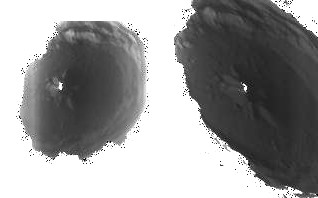
Two views of the interior of Petronius crater. These long-exposure images show a star-shaped central peak whose summit is illuminated by sunlight.

Petronius has a region of permanent shadow on much of its floor, which has a bright radar signature. This is interpreted to represent a deposit of water ice.

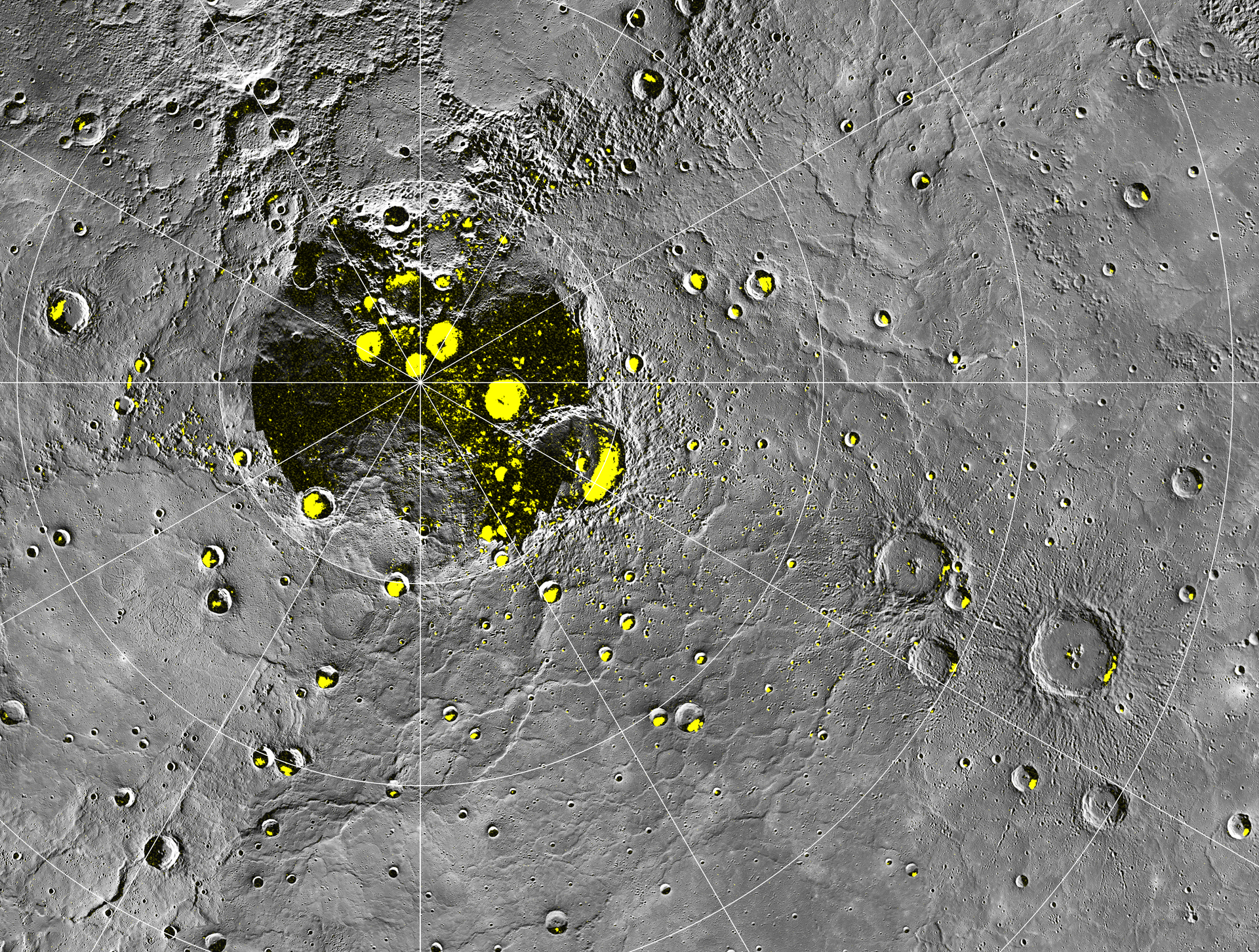
Radar-bright deposits near the north pole. Petronius is left of center.
