= Oberth (crater) =

Crater on the Moon

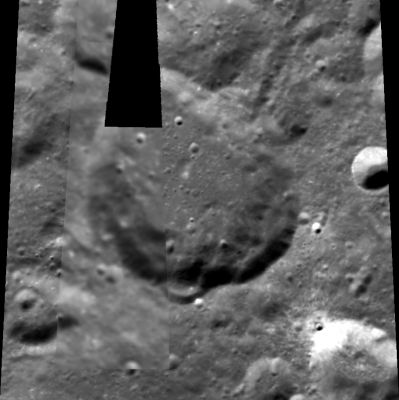
- Clementine mosaic
- Coordinates: 62.4°N 155.4°E
- Diameter: 60 km
- Depth: Unknown
- Colongitude: 207° at sunrise
- Eponym: Hermann Oberth

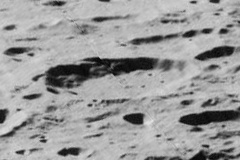
Oblique Lunar Orbiter 5 image, facing west

Oberth is a crater on the far side of the Moon. It lies in the high northern latitudes, to the southeast of the crater Gamow. To the east of Oberth is Avogadro.

This is a slightly eroded crater with a roughly circular but uneven outer rim. A pair of small crater-like depressions are attached to the northern rim, and the inner wall is narrower along that section. There are slight outward bulges in the rim to the northwest and along the south. The interior floor is relatively level, with a small hill to the north of the midpoint. Several tiny craterlets lie across the crater floor.

It is named after the German physicist Hermann Oberth.
