= Ricco (crater) =

Crater on the Moon

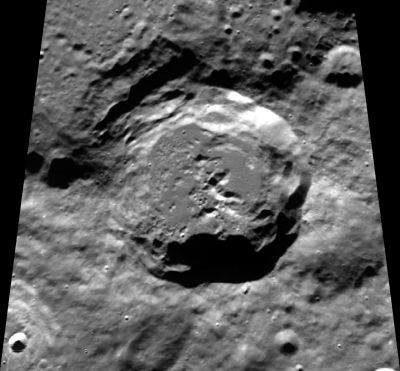
- Clementine mosaic
- Coordinates: 75.6°N 176.3°E
- Diameter: 65 km
- Depth: 4.83 km (3.00 mi)
- Colongitude: 184° at sunrise
- Eponym: Annibale Ricco

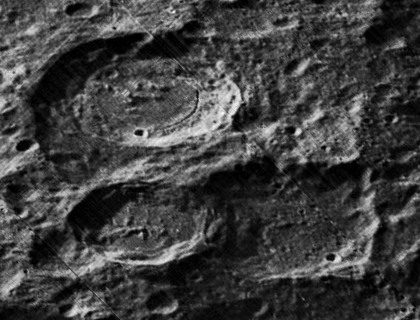
Oblique view of Karpinskiy (upper left), Ricco (lower left), and Milankovic (lower right), from Lunar Orbiter 5

Ricco is a lunar impact crater. It is located in the northern part of the Moon's far side. This crater overlies the southeastern rim of the larger crater Milankovic. Less than one crater diameter to the southwest is Karpinskiy, while to the southeast is Roberts.

This is a relatively fresh crater formation that has not been degraded through impact erosion. The rim edge is well-defined except along the southwestern edge. Along that side skirt of ejecta from Karpinsky overlies the edge and the inner wall, reaching to the edge of the interior floor. The remainder of the inner wall has a slumped in places, forming a steep top section and shelves or terraces of slumped material. The most extensive terraces occur along the northwestern side, where the rim overlays part of Milankovic. The outer rampart of Ricco spills over to form a pile covering a quarter of the interior of Milankovic's floor.

The interior floor of Ricco has level patches surrounding a formation of ridges about the midpoint. The most prominent of these ridges lies along the northeast side of the midpoint. There is a smaller ridge to the south and a low ridge in the northern floor. Several low hills lie across the crater floor.
