= Rozhdestvenskiy (crater) =

Crater on the Moon

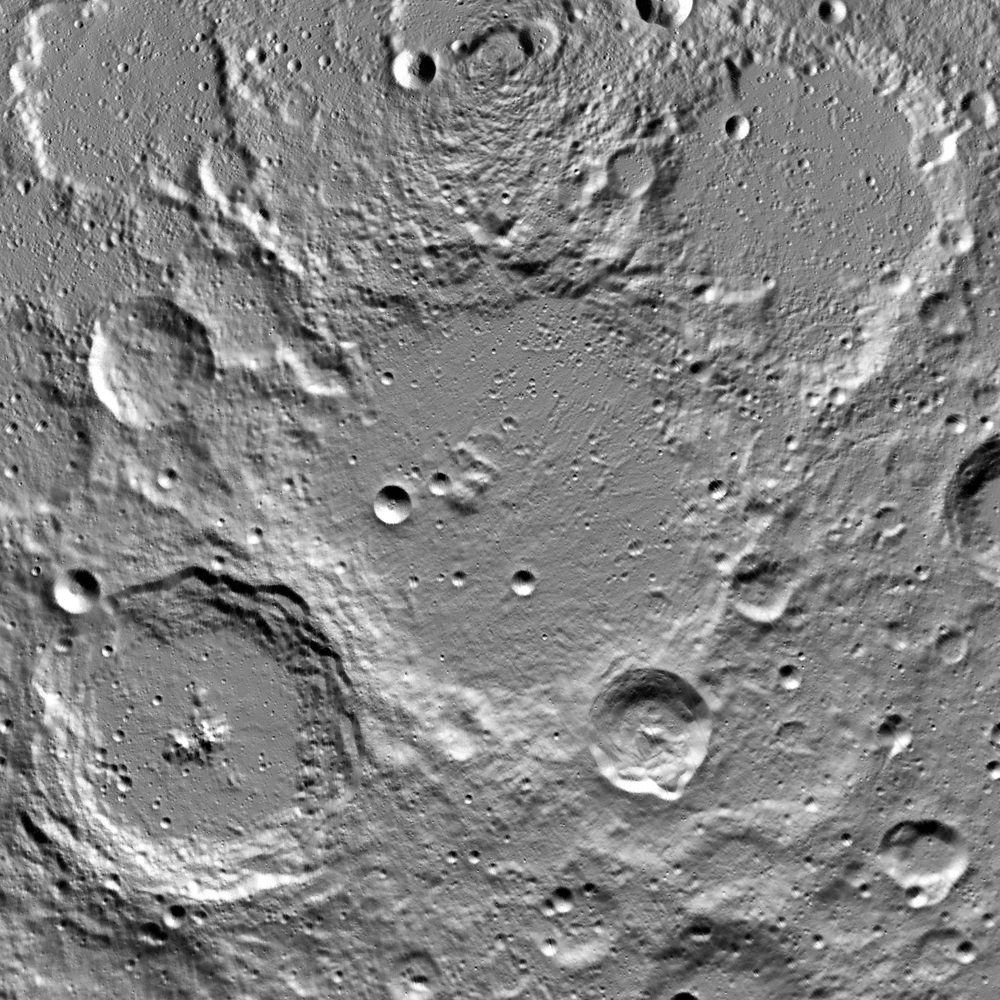
- Topographic map of Rozhdestvenskiy (center) by LRO's laser altimeter. Plaskett is in lower left and Hermite is in upper right.
- Coordinates: 85.2°N 155.4°W
- Diameter: 177 km
- Depth: Unknown
- Colongitude: 190° at sunrise
- Eponym: Dimitri Rozhdestvensky

Rozhdestvenskiy is a large lunar impact crater that is located on the far side of the Moon, within one crater diameter of the north pole. It lies sandwiched between the craters Hermite along the eastern rim, and Plaskett which intrudes slightly into the west-southwestern rim. Just on the opposite side of the pole is the crater Peary.

This formation is a large crater of the form called a walled plain. The outer rim is heavily eroded and rugged, with a somewhat polygonal outline. The relatively young crater Rozhdestvenskiy K overlies the southern rim. To the northwest is a short chain of craters that forms a valley penetrating the rim.

The interior floor of the crater is relatively level with a central peak formation located to the west of the midpoint. Just to the west of this peak is a pair of small craters on the floor. There is also a small crater to the south of the midpoint, and the surface is marked by many tiny craterlets.

== Satellite craters ==
By convention these features are identified on lunar maps by placing the letter on the side of the crater midpoint that is closest to Rozhdestvenskiy.

| Rozhdestvenskiy | Latitude | Longitude | Diameter |
|---|---|---|---|
| H | 83.6° N | 131.0° W | 21 km |
| K | 82.7° N | 144.6° W | 42 km |
| U | 85.3° N | 151.9° E | 44 km |
| W | 84.8° N | 137.2° E | 75 km |
