= Karpinskiy (crater) =

Crater on the Moon

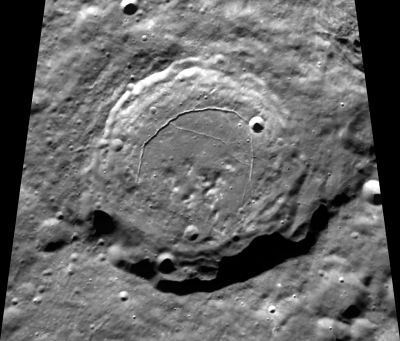
- Clementine mosaic
- Coordinates: 72.69°N 166.76°E
- Diameter: 91.4 km
- Depth: Unknown
- Colongitude: 163° at sunrise
- Eponym: Alexander P. Karpinsky

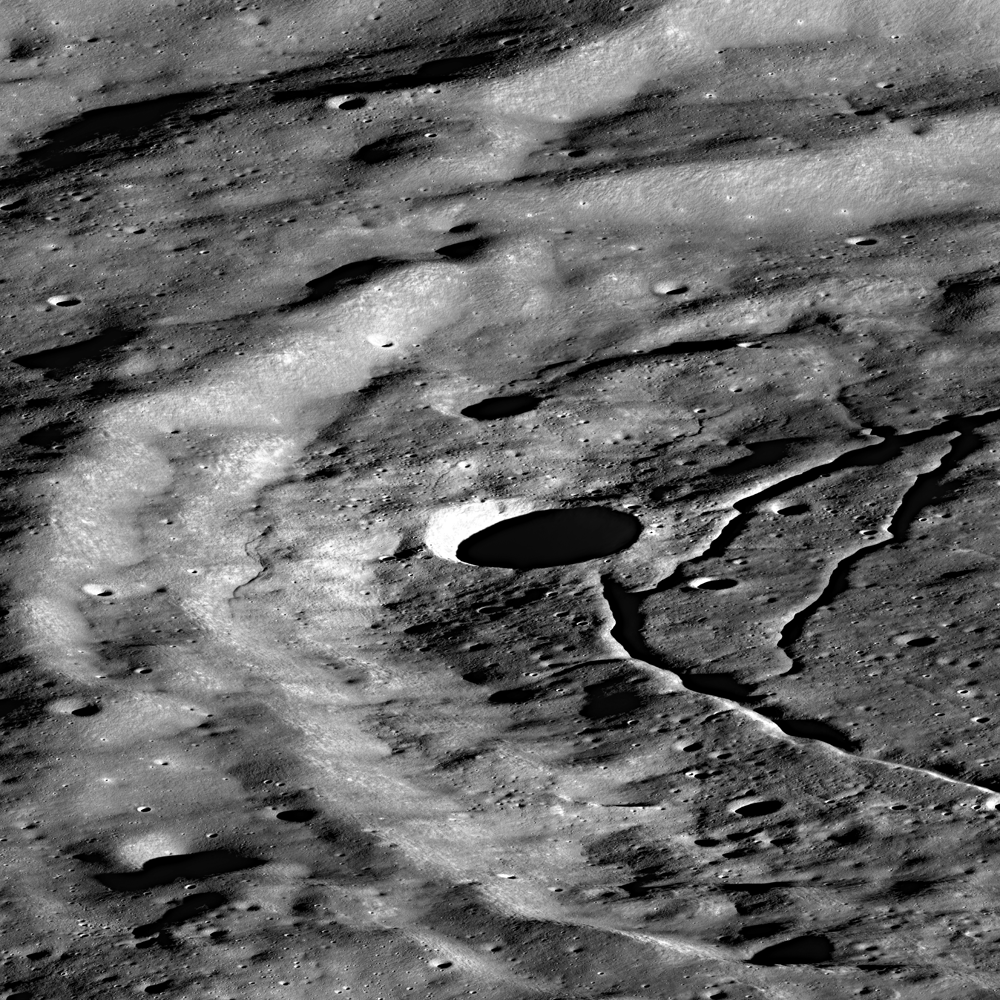
Oblique view from LRO. Note the prominent rilles at the right. The crater at center is 6 km across, and view is to the southeast.

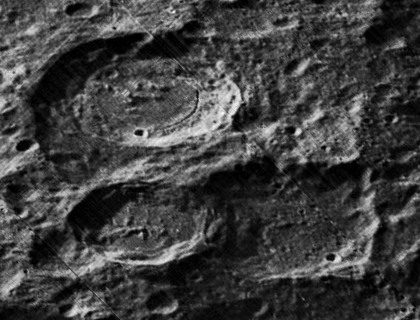
Oblique view of Karpinskiy (upper left), Ricco (lower left), and Milankovic (lower right), from Lunar Orbiter 5

Karpinskiy is a lunar impact crater that lies in the northern part of the Moon on the far side from the Earth. This crater is concentric with a larger and older formation lying along the southern rim. This combined rim gives Karpinskiy a larger and wider interior wall along its south face. Just to the north is the double-crater formation of Milankovic and Ricco, which lies across the northern part of the large crater containing Karpinskiy. To the southeast of Karpinskiy is the smaller crater Schjellerup.

The inner wall of Karpinskiy is terraced, particularly along the northern half. The southern half is irregular and wide, but lacks a well-defined terrace system. A small crater lies along the southern inner wall. The interior floor is flatter in the northern half and somewhat rough and hilly in the south, particularly near the crater midpoint. There is a rille system in the northern part of the floor, with the most prominent rille following an arc that nearly parallels the inner wall, coming closest to the edge in the northeast where is joins the rim of a small, bowl-shaped crater.

The crater is sometimes spelled "Karpinsky". It is named after Alexander Karpinsky (1846–1936), Russian geologist.

== Satellite craters ==
By convention these features are identified on lunar maps by placing the letter on the side of the crater midpoint that is closest to Karpinskiy.

Karpinskiy	Latitude	Longitude	Diameter
J	71.5° N	175.1° E	25 km
