= Sylvester (crater) =

Lunar impact crater

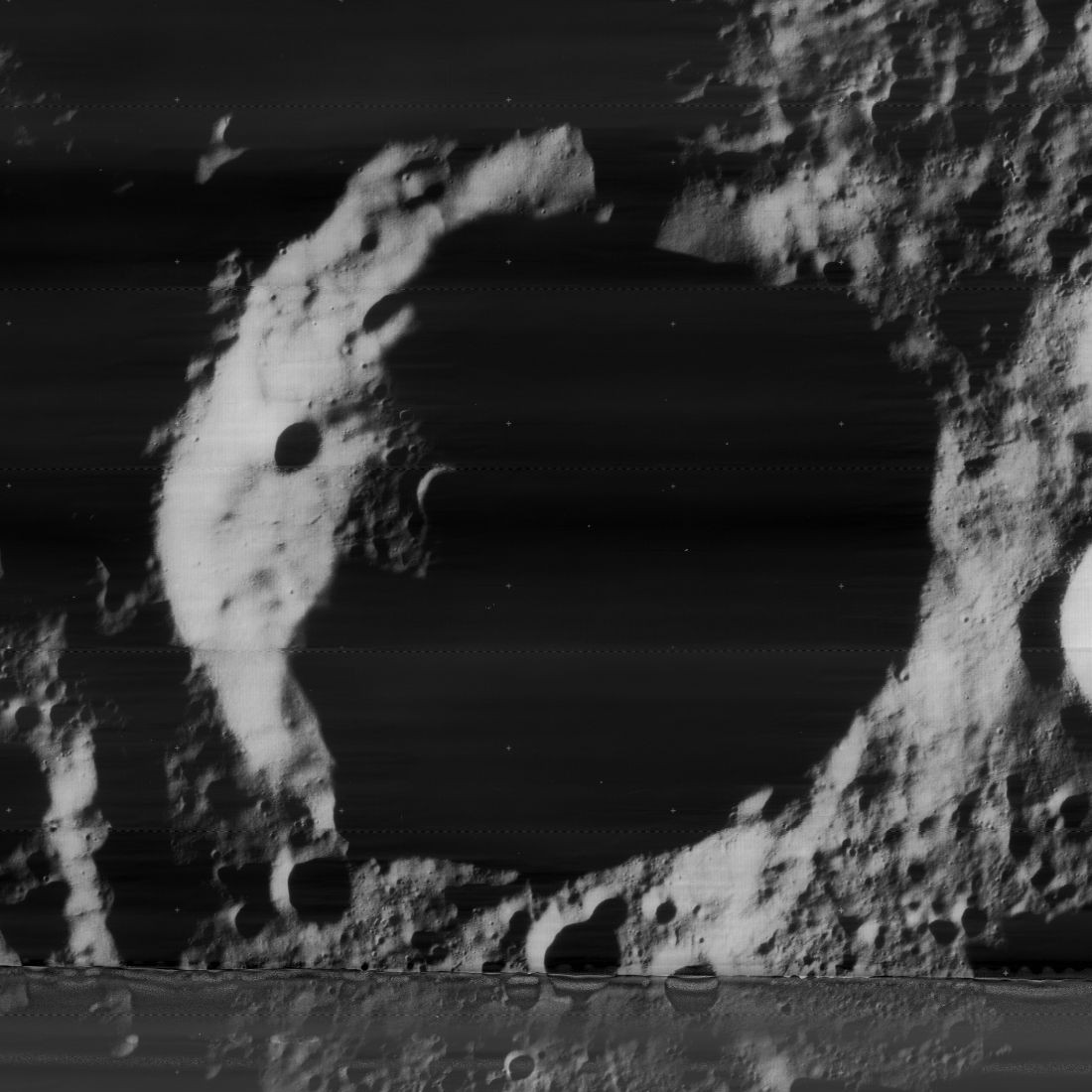
- Lunar Orbiter 4 image
- Coordinates: 82.7°N 79.6°W
- Diameter: 58 km
- Depth: Unknown
- Colongitude: 87° at sunrise
- Eponym: James J. Sylvester

Sylvester is a lunar impact crater that is located near the north pole of the Moon, along the northern limb in the libration zone. It lies just to the south-southeast of the craters Grignard and Hermite; the latter of which is within one crater diameter of the pole. South of Sylvester is Pascal. Due to its location, Sylvester receives sunlight at only a low angle.

This crater is generally circular, with a sharp-edged rim that has received only a moderate amount of wear. There are no craters of note along the rim, although Sylvester intrudes into a smaller, shallow-rimmed crater to the southeast. The interior floor is relatively flat, but punctuated by several tiny craters. At the midpoint is a small central peak.

This formation is named after James J. Sylvester (1814–1897).

== Satellite craters ==
By convention these features are identified on lunar maps by placing the letter on the side of the crater midpoint that is closest to Sylvester.

Sylvester	Latitude	Longitude	Diameter
N	82.4° N	67.3° W	20 km
