= 19139 Apian =

Asteroid

Discovery
- Discovered by: F. Börngen
- Discovery site: Karl Schwarzschild Obs.
- Discovery date: 6 April 1989

Designations
- Named after: Petrus Apianus (German humanist)
- Alternative designations: 1989 GJ_{8} · 1999 XP_{18}
- Minor planet category: main-belt · (middle) background

Orbital characteristics
- Epoch 4 September 2017 (JD 2458000.5)
- Uncertainty parameter 0
- Observation arc: 28.09 yr (10,261 days)
- Aphelion: 2.7824 AU
- Perihelion: 2.3841 AU
- Semi-major axis: 2.5832 AU
- Eccentricity: 0.0771
- Orbital period (sidereal): 4.15 yr (1,516 days)
- Mean anomaly: 105.06°
- Mean motion: 0° 14^{m} 14.64^{s} / day
- Inclination: 8.0241°
- Longitude of ascending node: 48.222°
- Argument of perihelion: 336.68°

Physical characteristics
- Dimensions: 5.643±0.089 km
- Geometric albedo: 0.265±0.039
- Absolute magnitude (H): 13.5

19139 Apian (provisional designation 1989 GJ_{8}) is a bright background asteroid from the central regions of the asteroid belt, approximately 6 kilometers in diameter. It was discovered on 6 April 1989, by German astronomer Freimut Börngen at the Karl Schwarzschild Observatory in Tautenburg, Eastern Germany. The asteroid was named for medieval German humanist Petrus Apianus.

== Orbit and classification ==
Apian is a non-family asteroid from the main belt's background population. It orbits the Sun in the central asteroid belt at a distance of 2.4–2.8 AU once every 4 years and 2 months (1,516 days; semi-major axis of 2.58 AU). Its orbit has an eccentricity of 0.08 and an inclination of 8° with respect to the ecliptic.

The body's observation arc begins with a precovery published in the Digitized Sky Survey and taken at Palomar Observatory in February 1989, approximately 2 months prior to its official discovery observation at Tautenburg.

== Physical characteristics ==
The asteroid's spectral type is unknown. Based on its albedo (see below), it is a stony rather than carbonaceous asteroid.

=== Rotation period ===
As of 2018, no rotational lightcurve of Apian has been obtained from photometric observations. The asteroid's rotation period, poles and shape remain unknown.

=== Diameter and albedo ===
According to the survey carried out by the NEOWISE mission of NASA's Wide-field Infrared Survey Explorer, Apian measures 5.643 kilometers in diameter and its surface has an albedo of 0.265.

== Naming ==
This minor planet was named after Petrus Apianus (1495–1552), also known as Peter Apian, a German mathematician and cartographer, who also built astronomical instruments. He is best known for his sky atlas Astronomicum Caesareum published in 1540. The lunar crater Apianus was also named in his honor.

The approved naming citation was published by the Minor Planet Center on 20 November 2002 (M.P.C. 47168).
