= Halley's Comet =

Periodic comet

1P/Halley
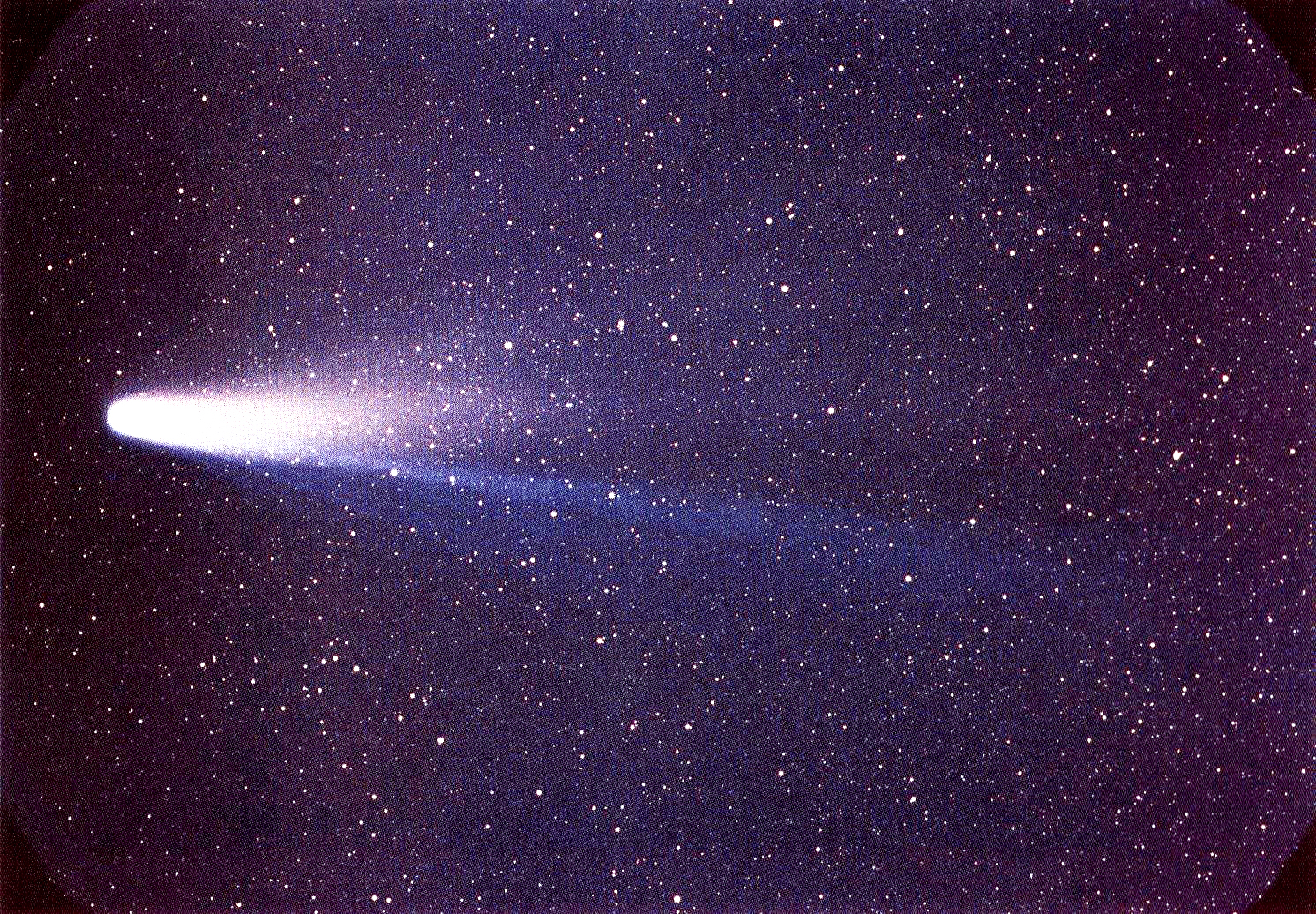
- Halley's Comet photographed by William Liller from Easter Island on 8 March 1986

Discovery
- Discovered by: Edmond Halley (Note: The comet is known since at least the ancient times) (recognition of periodicity)
- Discovery date: 25 December 1758 (first predicted return)

Designations
- Alternative designations: Various (See Apparitions)

Orbital characteristics
- Epoch: 4 August 2061 (JD 2474040.5)
- Observation arc: 2,243 years (Note: Observation arc from the Minor Planet Center database only covered dates from 21 August 1835 until 8 March 2003 (168.55 years). This figure included its entire arc up to 240 BC.)
- Earliest precovery date: May 240 BC
- Number of observations: 8,518
- Aphelion: 35.14 au
- Perihelion: 0.59278 au
- Semi-major axis: 17.737 au
- Eccentricity: 0.96658
- Orbital period: 74.7 years
- Inclination: 161.96°
- Longitude of ascending node: 59.396°
- Argument of periapsis: 112.05°
- Mean anomaly: 0.07323°
- Last perihelion: 8 February 1986
- Next perihelion: 28 July 2061; ≈27 March 2134
- T_{Jupiter}: –0.598
- Earth MOID: 0.075 au
- Jupiter MOID: 0.783 au

Physical characteristics
- Dimensions: 14.42 km × 7.4 km × 7.4 km (Giotto); 15.3 km × 7.22 km × 7.22 km (Vega)
- Mean diameter: 11 km (6.8 mi)
- Mass: (2.2±0.9)×10^{14} kg
- Mean density: 0.55±0.25 g/cm^{3}; 0.2–1.5 g/cm^{3} (est.)
- Escape velocity: ~0.002 km/s
- Geometric albedo: 0.04
- Comet total magnitude (M1): 5.5
- Comet nuclear magnitude (M2): 13.6
- Apparent magnitude: 2.1 (1986 apparition)

Halley's Comet (Note: See Pronunciation) is the only known short-period comet that is consistently visible to the naked eye from Earth, appearing roughly every 74–79 years. It last appeared in the inner parts of the Solar System in 1986 and will next appear in mid-2061. Officially designated 1P/Halley, it is also commonly called Comet Halley, or sometimes simply Halley.

Halley's periodic returns to the inner Solar System have been observed and recorded by astronomers around the world since at least 240 BC, but it was not until 1705 that the English astronomer Edmond Halley understood that these appearances were re-appearances of the same comet. As a result of this discovery, the comet is named after Halley.

In March 1986, during its latest visit to the inner Solar System, Halley's Comet became the first comet to be observed in detail by a spacecraft, the European Space Agency's Giotto mission, providing the first observational data on the structure of a comet nucleus and the mechanism of coma and tail formation. These observations supported several longstanding hypotheses about comet construction, particularly Fred Whipple's "dirty snowball" model, which correctly predicted that Halley would be composed of a mixture of volatile ices—such as water, carbon dioxide, ammonia—and dust.

The missions also provided data that substantially reformed and reconfigured these ideas; for instance, it is now understood that the surface of Halley is largely composed of dusty, non-volatile materials, and that only a small portion of it is icy. It was also visited by the two spacecraft of the Vega program, Vega 1 & 2, on 6 and 9 March, respectively. They went as close as 8,890 km (5,520 mi), and 8,030 km (4,990 mi), providing data on Halley's dimensions, shape, temperature, and surface properties.

== Pronunciation ==
Comet Halley is usually pronounced /ˈhæli/, rhyming with valley, or sometimes /ˈheɪli/, rhyming with daily. As to the surname Halley, Colin Ronan, one of Edmond Halley's biographers, preferred /ˈhɔːli/, rhyming with crawly.

Spellings of Halley's name during his lifetime included Hailey, Haley, Hayley, Halley, Haly, Hawley, and Hawly, so its contemporary pronunciation is uncertain, but the version rhyming with valley seems to be preferred by modern bearers of the surname.

== Computation of orbit ==
Halley was the first comet to be recognised as periodic. Until the Renaissance, the philosophical consensus on the nature of comets, promoted by Aristotle, was that they were disturbances in Earth's atmosphere. This idea was disproven in 1577 by Tycho Brahe, who used parallax measurements to show that comets must lie beyond the Moon. Many were still unconvinced that comets orbited the Sun, and assumed instead that they must follow straight paths through the Solar System. In 1687, Sir Isaac Newton published his Philosophiæ Naturalis Principia Mathematica, in which he outlined his laws of gravity and motion. His work on comets was decidedly incomplete. Although he had suspected that two comets that had appeared in succession in 1680 and 1681 were the same comet before and after passing behind the Sun (he was later found to be correct – see Newton's Comet), he was initially unable to completely reconcile comets into his model.

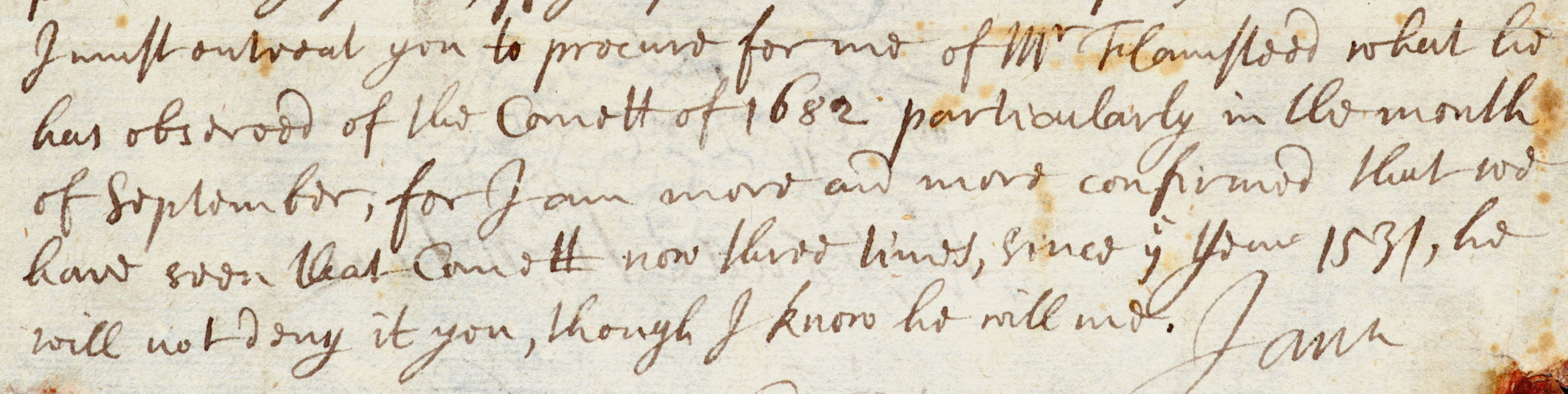
"I must entreat you to procure for me of Mr Flamsteed what he has observed of the Comett of 1682 particularly in the month of September, for I am more and more confirmed that we have seen that Comett now three times, since yͤ Yeare 1531, he will not deny it you, though I know he will me." —Excerpt of Halley's letter to Newton about comet's orbits (September 28, 1695)

Ultimately it was Newton's friend, editor and publisher, Edmond Halley, who, in his 1705 Synopsis of the Astronomy of Comets, used Newton's new laws to calculate the gravitational effects of Jupiter and Saturn on cometary orbits. Having compiled a list of 24 comet observations, he calculated that the orbital elements of a second comet that had appeared in 1682 were nearly the same as those of two comets that had appeared in 1531 (observed by Petrus Apianus) and 1607 (observed by Johannes Kepler). Halley thus concluded that all three comets were the same object returning about every 76 years, a period that has since been found to vary between 72 and 80 years. After a rough estimate of the perturbations the comet would sustain from the gravitational attraction of the planets, he predicted its return for 1758. He personally observed the comet around perihelion in September 1682, but died in 1742 before he could observe its predicted return.

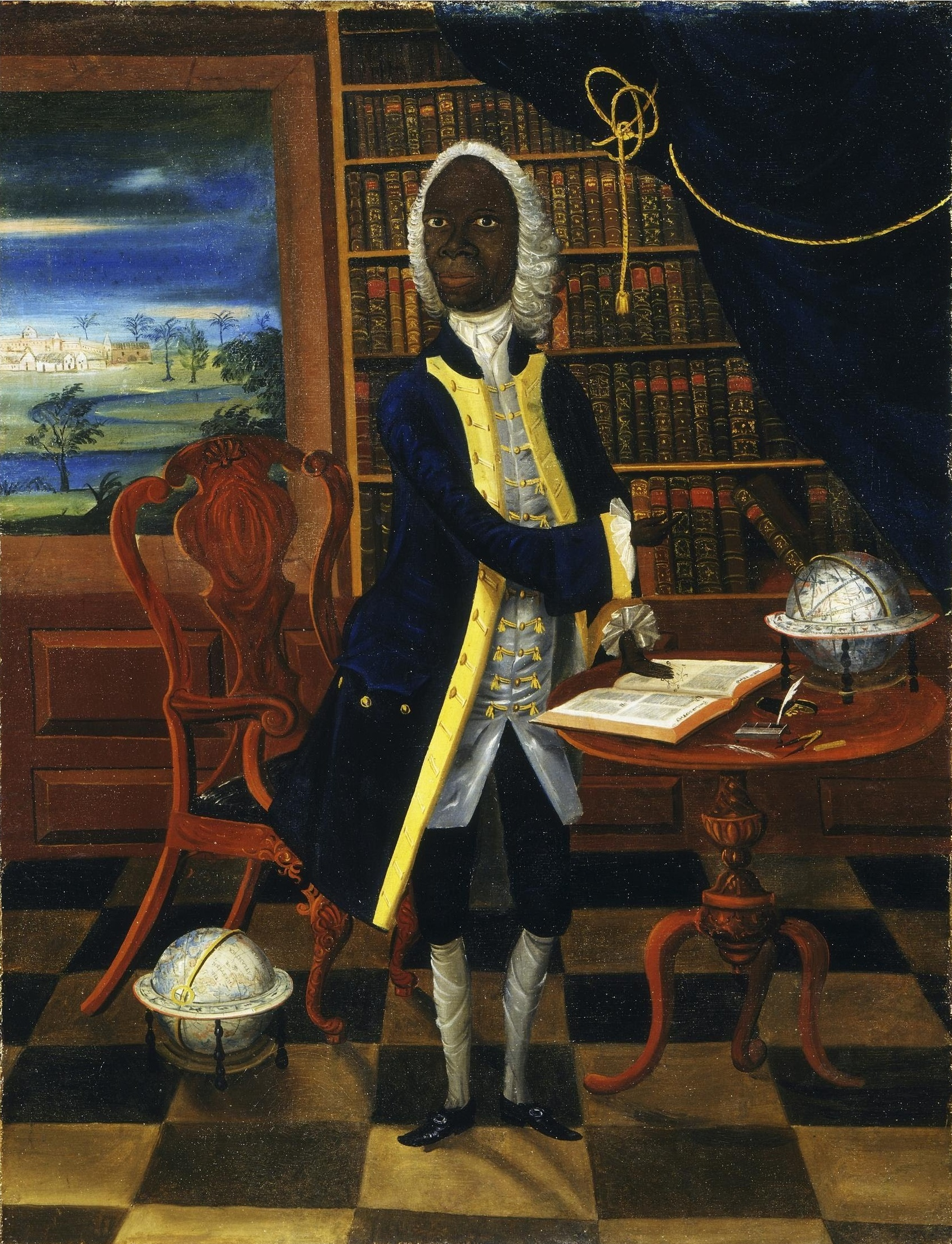
Jamaican polymath Francis Williams (portrait attributed to William Williams, c. 1760). The only contemporary illustration of an astronomer detecting the comet's return.

Halley's prediction of the comet's return proved to be correct, although it was not seen until 25 December 1758, by Johann Georg Palitzsch, a German farmer and amateur astronomer. Other observers from throughout Europe and its colonies sent confirmations to Paris after the comet brightened early the following year. In the Americas, John Winthrop lectured at Harvard University to explain the implications of the comet's reappearance for Newtonian mechanics and natural theology.

Another independent recognition that the comet had returned was made by the Jamaican astronomer Francis Williams, but his observations did not reach Europe. A unique portrait commissioned by Williams demonstrates the impact of the comet's return on period astronomers. Williams' hand rests on page 521 of the third edition of Newton's Principia with procedures to predict comet sightings. The white smudge in the sky is probably a depiction of Halley's comet relative to the constellations in March 1759, and the cord hanging above the book likely represents the comet's orbit. In 2024, using X-ray imaging, the painting was shown to depict the field of stars in which the comet would have been visible in 1759. Williams likely commissioned the portrait to commemorate his observations.

The comet did not pass through its perihelion until 13 March 1759, the attraction of Jupiter and Saturn having caused a delay of 618 days. This effect was computed before its return (with a one-month error to 13 April) by a team of three French mathematicians, Alexis Clairaut, Joseph Lalande, and Nicole-Reine Lepaute. The confirmation of the comet's return was the first time anything other than planets had been shown to orbit the Sun. It was also one of the earliest successful tests of Newtonian physics, and a clear demonstration of its explanatory power. The comet was first named in Halley's honour by French astronomer Nicolas-Louis de Lacaille in 1759.

Some scholars have proposed that first-century Mesopotamian astronomers already had recognised Halley's Comet as periodic. This theory notes a passage in the Babylonian Talmud, tractate Horayot that refers to "a star which appears once in seventy years that makes the captains of the ships err". It has also been suggested that the passage may have referred to the variable star Mira, whose brightness oscillates with a period of sixty years.

Researchers in 1981 attempting to calculate the past orbits of Halley by numerical integration starting from accurate observations in the seventeenth and eighteenth centuries could not produce accurate results further back than 837 owing to a close approach to Earth in that year. It was necessary to use ancient Chinese comet observations to constrain their calculations.

== Orbit and origin ==
The orbital path of Halley, against the orbits of the planets (animation)

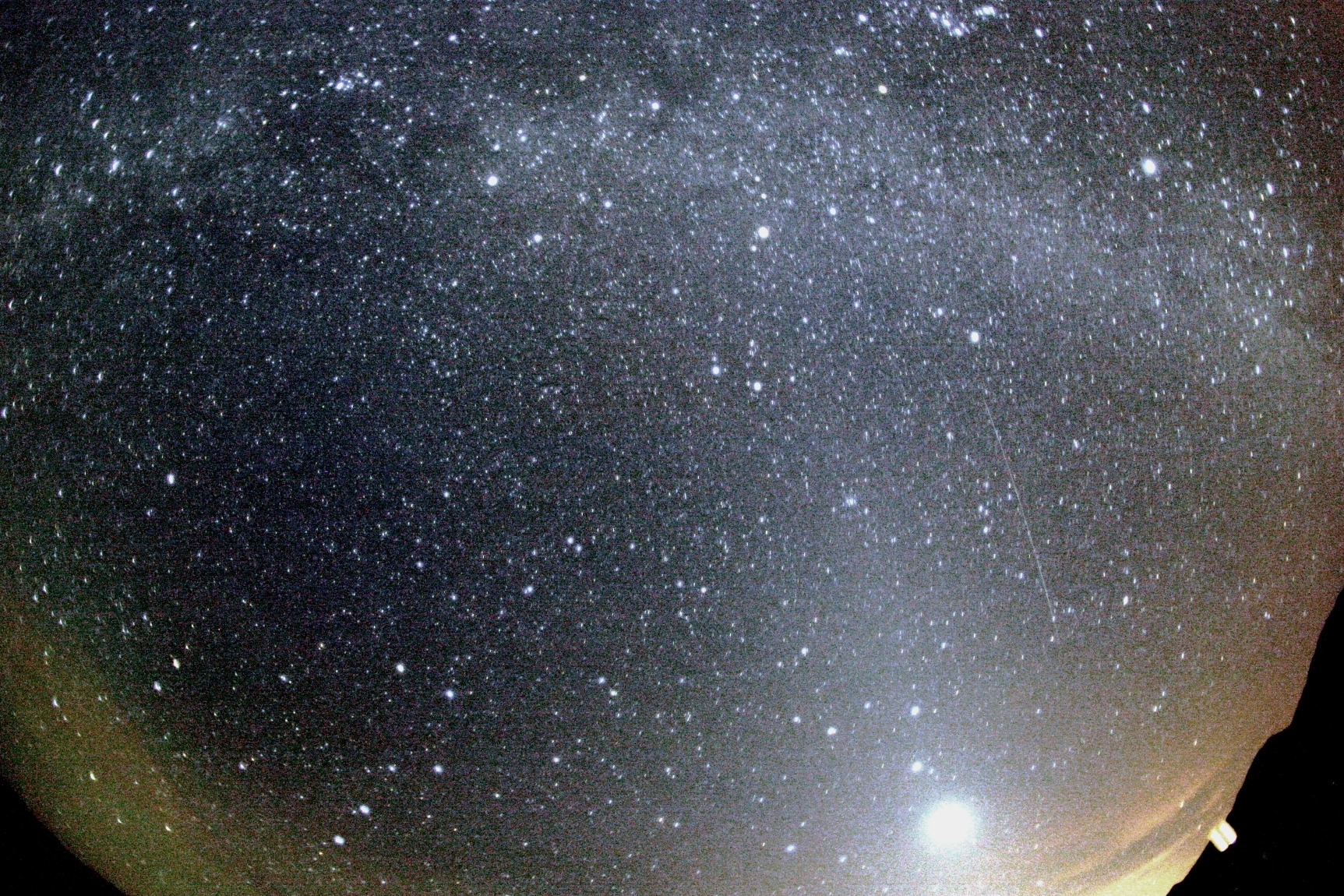
Orionid meteor originating from Halley's Comet streaking the sky below the Milky Way and to the right of Venus

Halley's orbital period has varied between 74 and 80 years since 240 BC. Its orbit around the Sun is highly elliptical, with an orbital eccentricity of 0.967 (with 0 being a circle and 1 being a parabolic trajectory). The perihelion, the point in the comet's orbit when it is nearest the Sun, is 0.59 au (88 million km). This is between the orbits of Mercury and Venus. Its aphelion, or farthest distance from the Sun, is 35 au (5.2 billion km), roughly the orbital distance of Pluto. Unlike the overwhelming majority of objects in the Solar System, Halley's orbit is retrograde; it orbits the Sun in the opposite direction to the planets, or, clockwise from above the Sun's north pole. The orbit is inclined by 18° to the ecliptic, with much of it lying south of the ecliptic. This is usually represented as 162°, to account for Halley's retrograde orbit. The 1910 passage was at a relative velocity of 70.56 km/s (157,800 mph). Because its orbit comes close to Earth's in two places, Halley is associated with two meteor showers: the Eta Aquariids in early May, and the Orionids in late October.

Halley is classified as a periodic or short-period comet: one with an orbit lasting 200 years or less. This contrasts it with long-period comets, whose orbits last for thousands of years. Periodic comets have an average inclination to the ecliptic of only ten degrees, and an orbital period of just 6.5 years, so Halley's orbit is atypical. Most short-period comets (those with orbital periods shorter than 20 years and inclinations of 30 degrees or less) are called Jupiter-family comets. Those resembling Halley, with orbital periods of between 20 and 200 years and inclinations extending from zero to more than 90 degrees, are called Halley-type comets. As of 2024, 105 Halley-type comets have been observed, compared with 816 identified Jupiter-family comets.

The orbits of the Halley-type comets suggest that they were originally long-period comets whose orbits were perturbed by the gravity of the giant planets and directed into the inner Solar System. If Halley was once a long-period comet, it is likely to have originated in the Oort cloud, a sphere of cometary bodies around 20,000–50,000 au from the Sun. Conversely the Jupiter-family comets are generally believed to originate in the Kuiper belt, a flat disc of icy debris between 30 au (Neptune's orbit) and 50 au from the Sun (in the scattered disc). Another point of origin for the Halley-type comets was proposed in 2008, when a trans-Neptunian object with a retrograde orbit similar to Halley's was discovered, 2008 KV42, whose orbit takes it from just outside that of Uranus to twice the distance of Pluto. It may be a member of a new population of small Solar System bodies that serves as the source of Halley-type comets.

Halley has probably been in its current orbit for 16,000–200,000 years, although it is not possible to numerically integrate its orbit for more than a few tens of apparitions, and close approaches before 837 AD can only be verified from recorded observations. The non-gravitational effects can be crucial; as Halley approaches the Sun, it expels jets of sublimating gas from its surface, which knock it very slightly off its orbital path. These orbital changes cause delays in its perihelion passage of four days on average.

In 1989 Boris Chirikov and Vitold Vecheslavov performed an analysis of 46 apparitions of Halley's Comet taken from historical records and computer simulations, which showed that its dynamics were chaotic and unpredictable on long timescales. Halley's projected dynamical lifetime is estimated to be about 10 million years. The dynamics of its orbit can be approximately described by a two-dimensional symplectic map, known as the Kepler map, a solution to the restricted three-body problem for highly eccentric orbits. Based on records from the 1910 apparition, David Hughes calculated in 1985 that Halley's nucleus has been reduced in mass by 80 to 90% over the last 2,000 to 3,000 revolutions, and that it will most likely disappear completely after another 2,300 perihelion passages. More recent work suggests that Halley will evaporate, or split in two, within the next few tens of thousands of years, or will be ejected from the Solar System within a few hundred thousand years.

== Structure and composition ==
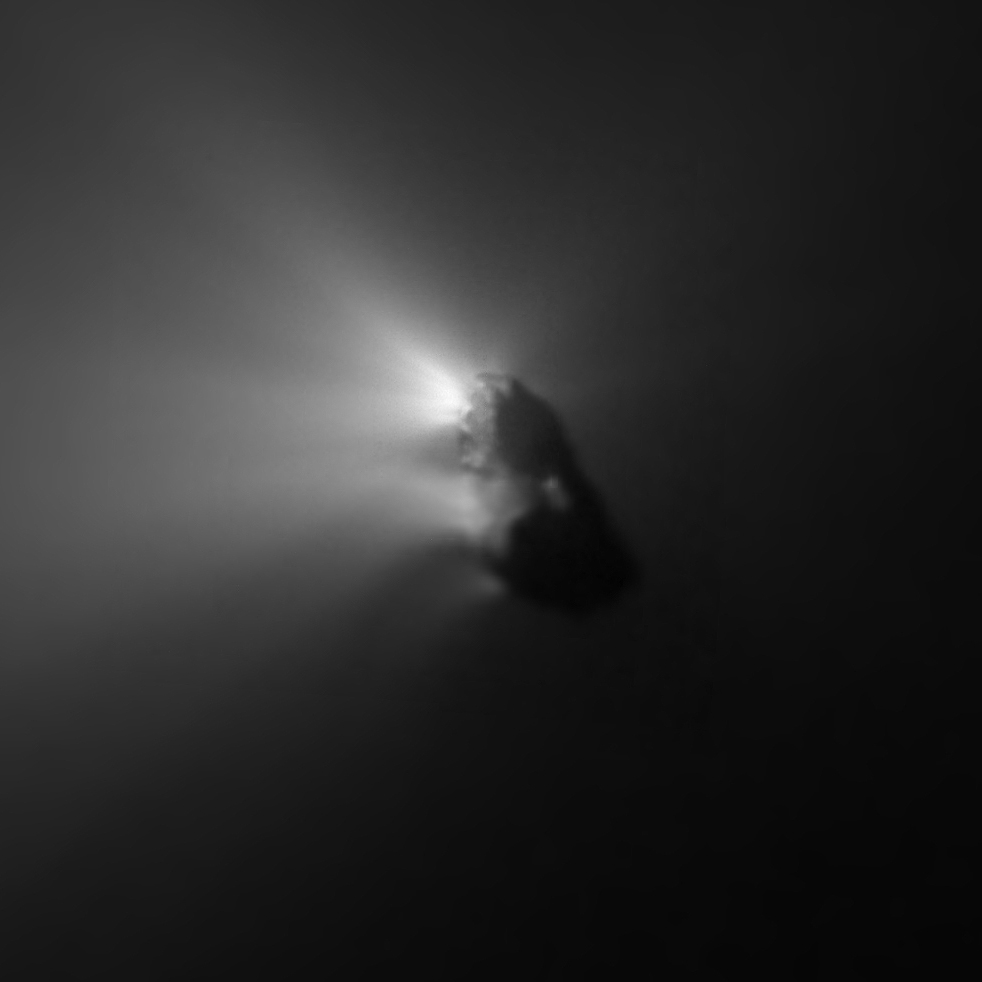
The nucleus of Halley's Comet, imaged by the Giotto probe on 14 March 1986. The dark colouration of the nucleus can be observed, as well as the jets of dust and gas erupting from its surface.

The Giotto and Vega missions gave planetary scientists their first view of Halley's surface and structure. The nucleus is a conglomerate of ices and dust, often referred to as a "dirty snowball". Like all comets, as Halley nears the Sun, its volatile compounds (those with low boiling points, such as water, carbon monoxide, carbon dioxide and other ices) begin to sublimate from the surface. This causes the comet to develop a coma, or atmosphere, at distances up to 230,000 kilometres (140,000 mi) from the nucleus. Sublimation of this dirty ice releases dust particles, which travel with the gas away from the nucleus. Gas molecules in the coma absorb solar light and then re-radiate it at different wavelengths, while dust particles scatter the solar light, making the coma visible. As a fraction of the gas molecules in the coma are ionised by the solar ultraviolet radiation, pressure from the solar wind, a stream of charged particles emitted by the Sun, pulls the coma's ions out into a long tail, which may extend more than 100 million kilometres into space. Changes in the flow of the solar wind can cause disconnection events, in which the tail completely breaks off from the nucleus.

Despite the vast size of its coma, Halley's nucleus is relatively small: barely 15 kilometres (9.3 mi) long, 8 kilometres (5.0 mi) wide and perhaps 8 kilometres (5.0 mi) thick. Based on a reanalysis of images taken by the Giotto and Vega spacecraft, Lamy et al. determined an effective diameter of 11 kilometres (6.8 mi). Its shape has been variously compared to that of a peanut, a potato, or an avocado. Its mass is roughly 2.2 × 10^{14} kg, with an average density of about 0.55 grams per cubic centimetre (0.32 oz/cu in). The low density indicates that it is made of a large number of small pieces, held together very loosely, forming a structure known as a rubble pile. Ground-based observations of coma brightness suggested that Halley's rotation period was about 7.4 days. Images taken by the various spacecraft, along with observations of the jets and shell, suggested a period of 52 hours. Given the irregular shape of the nucleus, Halley's rotation is likely to be complex. The flyby images revealed an extremely varied topography, with hills, mountains, ridges, depressions, and at least one crater.

Halley's day side (the side facing the Sun) is far more active than the night side. Spacecraft observations showed that the gases ejected from the nucleus were 80% water vapour, 17% carbon monoxide and 3–4% carbon dioxide, with traces of hydrocarbons although more recent sources give a value of 10% for carbon monoxide and also include traces of methane and ammonia. The dust particles were found to be primarily a mixture of carbon–hydrogen–oxygen–nitrogen (CHON) compounds common in the outer Solar System, and silicates, such as are found in terrestrial rocks. The dust particles ranged in size down to the limits of detection (≈0.001 μm). The ratio of deuterium to hydrogen in the water released by Halley was initially thought to be similar to that found in Earth's ocean water, suggesting that Halley-type comets may have delivered water to Earth in the distant past. Subsequent observations showed Halley's deuterium ratio to be far higher than that found in Earth's oceans, making such comets unlikely sources for Earth's water.

Giotto provided the first evidence in support of Fred Whipple's "dirty snowball" hypothesis for comet construction; Whipple postulated that comets are icy objects warmed by the Sun as they approach the inner Solar System, causing ices on their surfaces to sublime (change directly from a solid to a gas), and jets of volatile material to burst outward, creating the coma. Giotto showed that this model was broadly correct, though with modifications. Halley's albedo, for instance, is about 0.04, meaning that it reflects only 4% of the sunlight hitting it – about what one would expect for coal. Thus, despite astronomers predicting that Halley would have an albedo of about 0.17 (roughly equivalent to bare soil), Halley's Comet is in fact pitch black. The "dirty ices" on the surface sublime at temperatures between 170 K (−103 °C) in sections of higher albedo to 220 K (−53 °C) at low albedo; Vega 1 found Halley's surface temperature to be in the range 300–400 K (27–127 °C). This suggested that only 10% of Halley's surface was active, and that large portions of it were coated in a layer of dark dust that retained heat. Together, these observations suggested that Halley was in fact predominantly composed of non-volatile materials, and thus more closely resembled a "snowy dirtball" than a "dirty snowball".

== History ==
=== Before 1066 ===
Early descriptions of Halley's comet
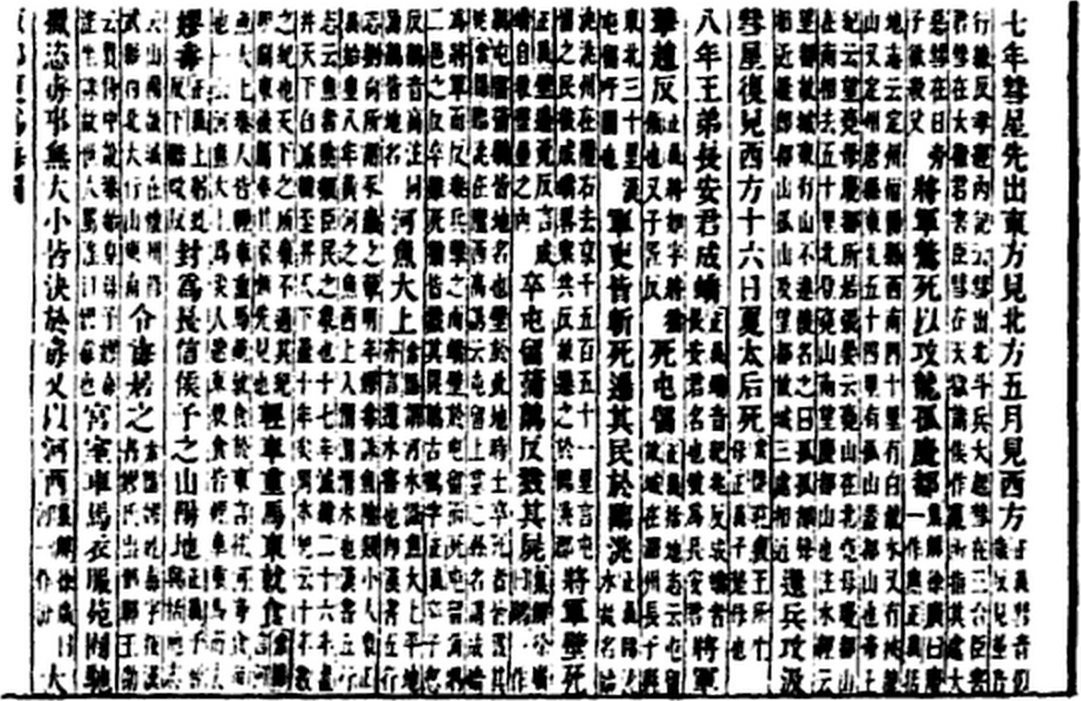
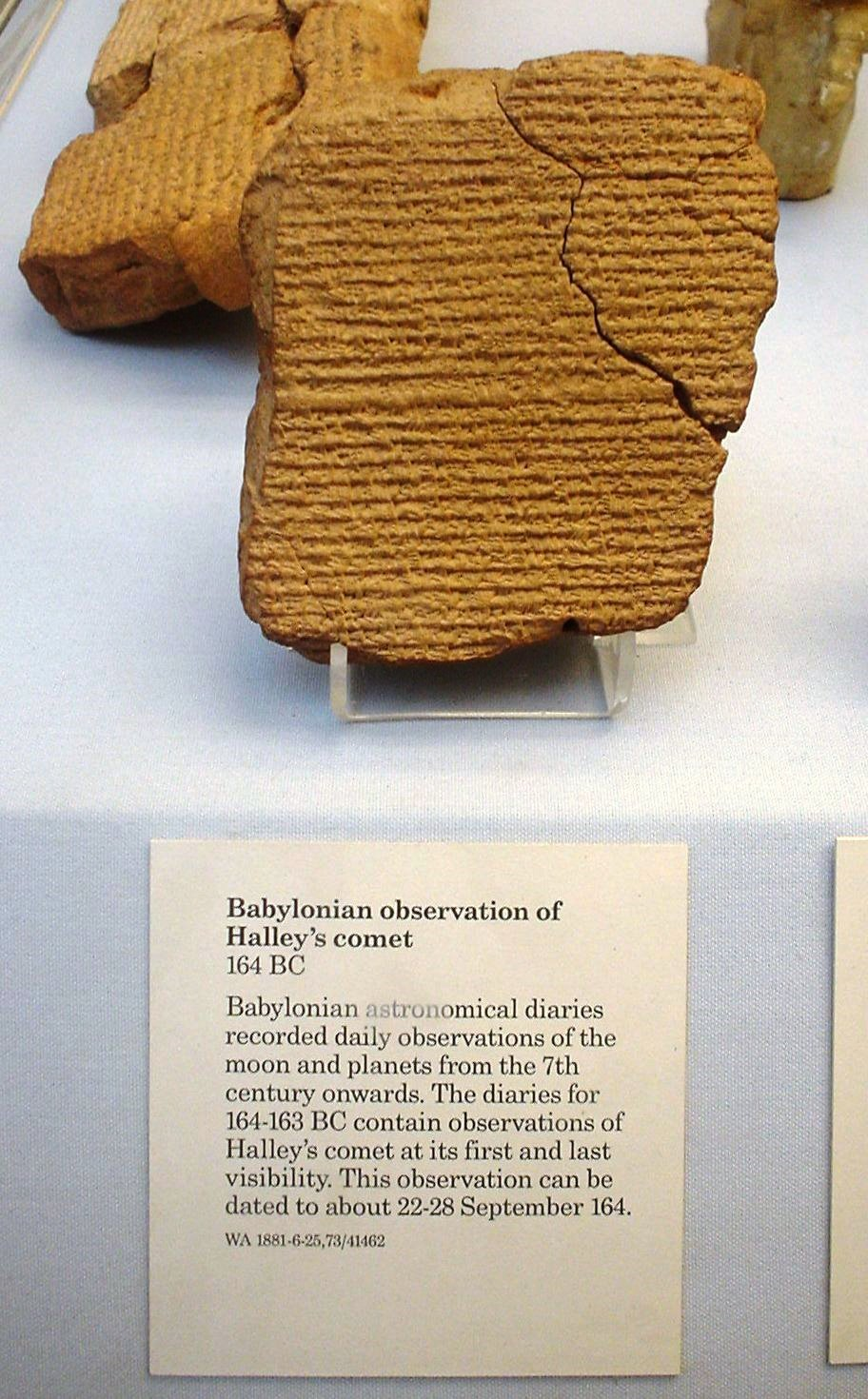
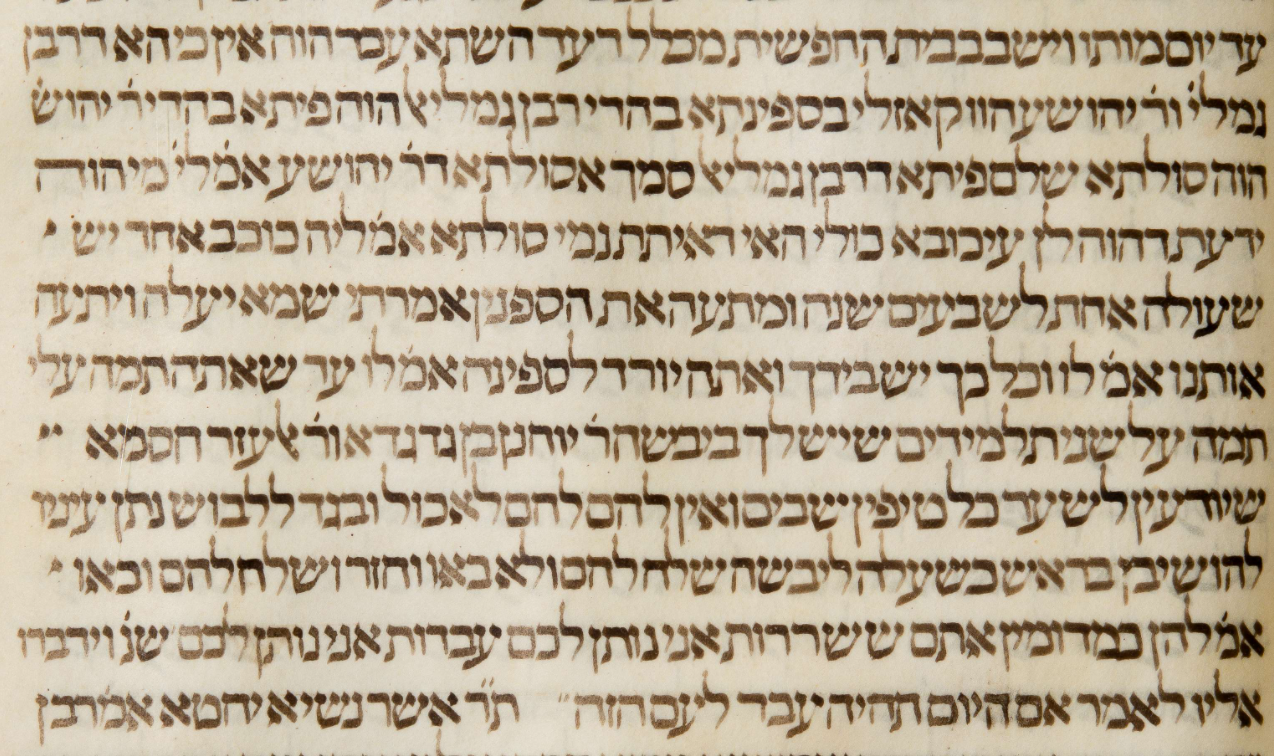
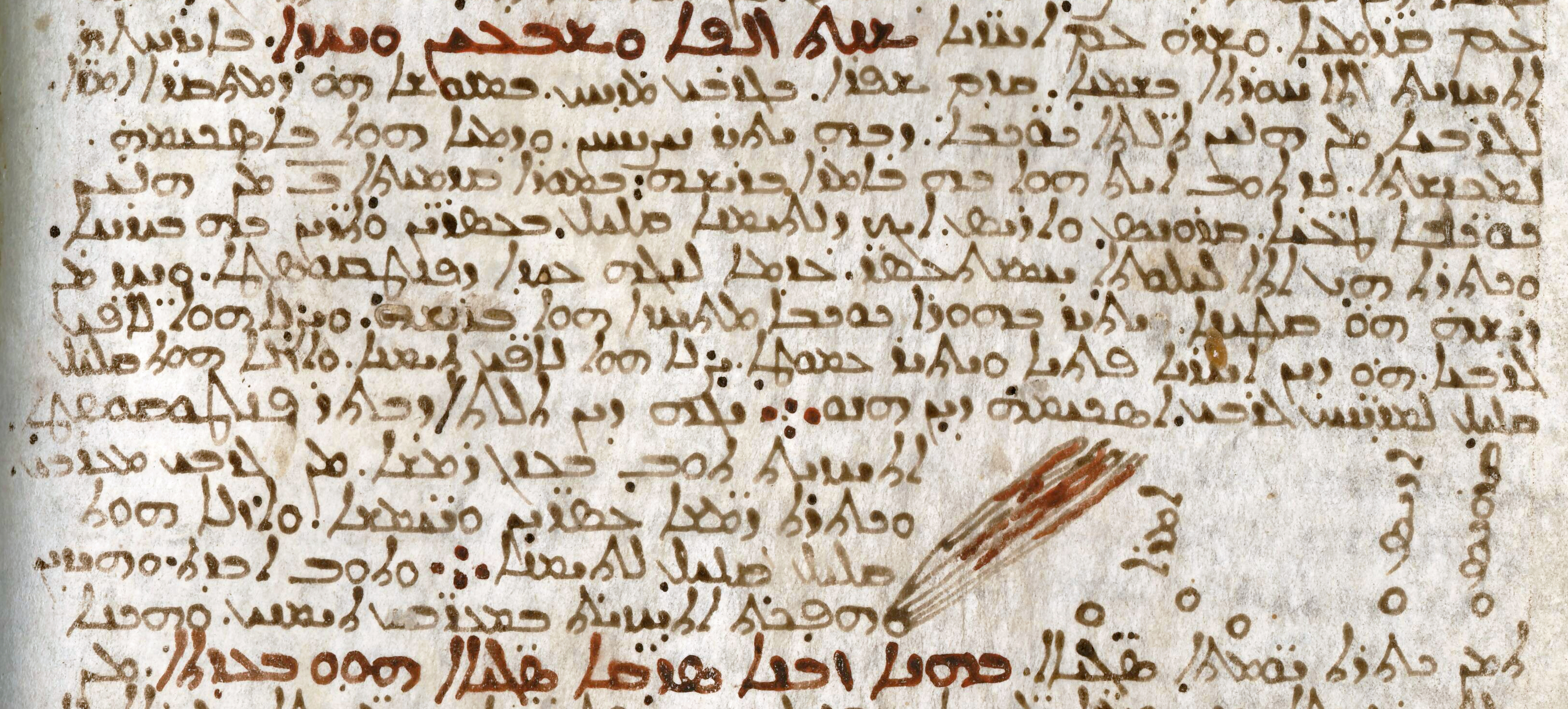
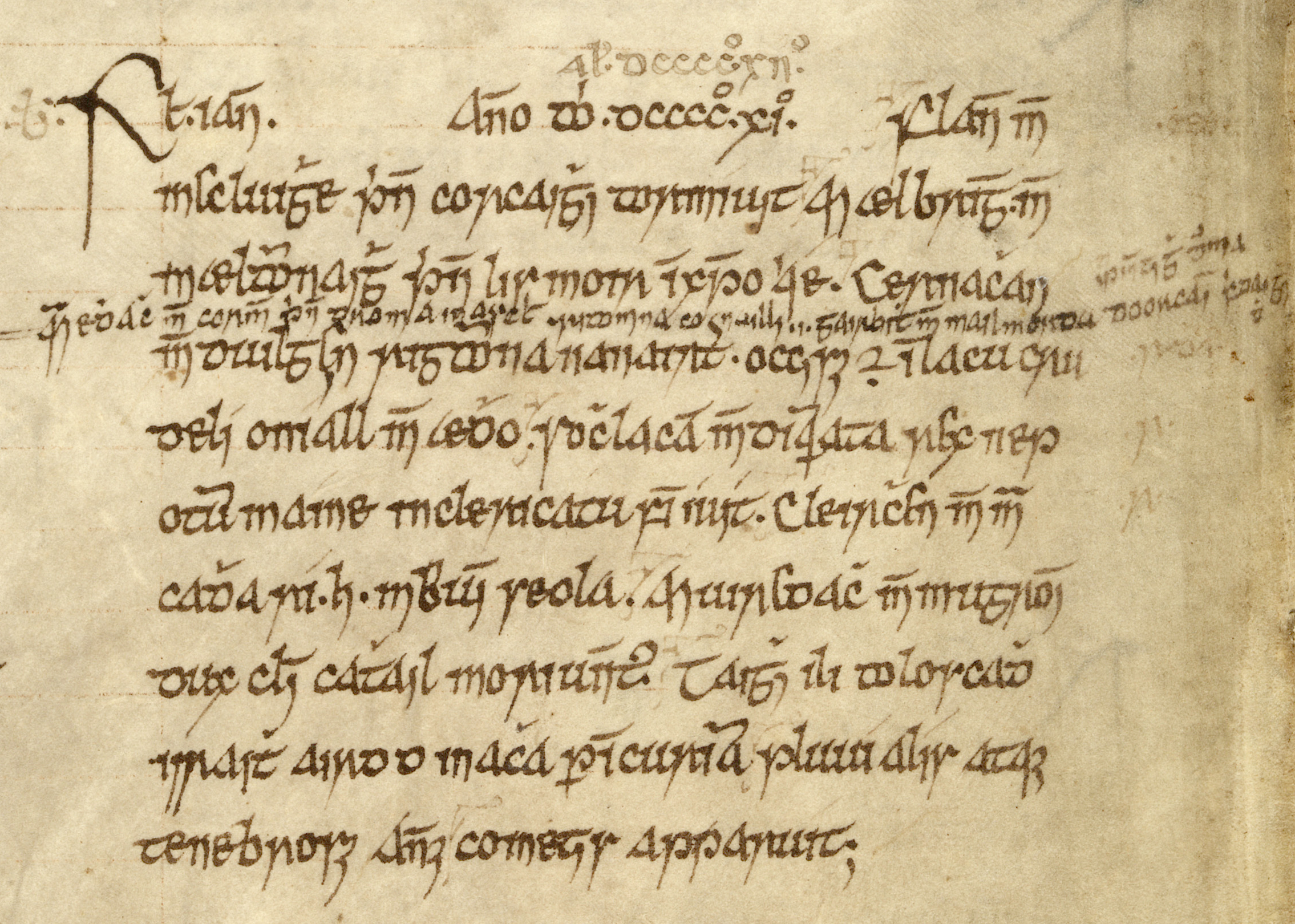
From left to right, top to bottom:
1. Report of Halley's Comet by Chinese astronomers in 240 BC (Shiji);
2. Observation of Halley's Comet, recorded in cuneiform on a clay tablet between 22 and 28 September 164 BC, Babylon, Iraq;
3. Possible record of Halley's Comet's 66 AD appearance in the Talmud (b. Horayot 10a);
4. The Zuqnin Chronicle's mention of Halley's Comet in 760 AD, with an illustration that includes the relative positions of Aries, Mars and Saturn in the sky;
5. The Annals of Ulster's entry for the year 912 AD, ending with Cometis apparuit ("a comet appeared").

Due to its intrinsic brightness, about one eighth of all comet sightings mentioned in historic records are of Halley's Comet. The first certain appearance of Halley's Comet in the historical record is a description from 240 BC, in the Chinese chronicle Records of the Grand Historian or Shiji, which describes a comet that appeared in the east and moved north. The only surviving record of the 164 BC apparition is found on two fragmentary Babylonian tablets, which were rediscovered in August 1984 in the collection of the British Museum.

The apparition of 87 BC was recorded in Babylonian tablets which state that the comet was seen "day beyond day" for a month. This appearance may be recalled in the representation of Tigranes the Great, an Armenian king who is depicted on coins with a crown that features, according to Vahe Gurzadyan and R. Vardanyan, "a star with a curved tail [that] may represent the passage of Halley's Comet in 87 BC." Gurzadyan and Vardanyan argue that "Tigranes could have seen Halley's Comet when it passed closest to the Sun on August 6 in 87 BC" as the comet would have been a "most recordable event".

The apparition of 12 BC was recorded in the Book of Han by Chinese astronomers of the Han dynasty who tracked it from August through October. It passed within 0.16 au of Earth. According to the Roman historian Cassius Dio, a comet appeared suspended over Rome for several days portending the death of Marcus Vipsanius Agrippa in that year. Halley's appearance in 12 BC, only a few years distant from the conventionally assigned date of the birth of Jesus Christ, has led some theologians and astronomers to suggest that it might explain the biblical story of the Star of Bethlehem. There are other explanations for the phenomenon, such as planetary conjunctions, and there are also records of other comets that appeared closer to the date of Jesus's birth.

If Yehoshua ben Hananiah's reference in the Talmud to "a star which arises once in seventy years and misleads the sailors" refers to Halley's Comet, he can only have witnessed the 66 AD appearance. Another possible reference to the same apparition is also found in the writings of the Jewish historian Josephus, who described several portents visible over Jerusalem shortly before the outbreak of the First Jewish–Roman War. He reported that "there was a star resembling a sword, which stood over the city, and a comet, that continued a whole year," (Note: William Whiston: "Whether Josephus means that this star was different from that comet which lasted a whole year, I cannot certainly determine. His words most favour their being different one from another.") events that were interpreted as omens of the city's destruction in 70 AD.

The 141 AD apparition was recorded in Chinese chronicles, with observations of a bluish white comet on 27 and 16 March, 22 April and 23. The early Tamil bards of southern India (c. 1st – 4th century CE) also describe a certain relatable event.

The 374 AD and 607 approaches each came within 0.09 au of Earth. The 451 AD apparition was said to herald the defeat of Attila the Hun at the Battle of Chalons.

The 684 AD apparition was reported in Chinese records as the "broom star".

The 760 AD apparition was recorded in the Zuqnin Chronicle's entry for iyyōr 1071 SE (May 760 AD), calling it a "white sign":

The year [SE] one thousand seventy one (AD 759/760).

In the month of iyyōr (May) a white sign was seen in the sky, before early twilight, in the north-east [quarter], in the Zodiac [sign] which is called Aries, to the north from these three stars in it, which are very shining. And it resembled in its shape a broom [...]

And the sign itself remained for fifteen nights, until dawn of the feast of Pentecost.

— Zuqnin Chronicle, fol.136v; Neuhäuser et al. (trans.)

In 837 AD, Halley's Comet may have passed as close as 0.03 astronomical units (2.8 million miles; 4.5 million kilometres) from Earth, by far its closest approach. Its tail may have stretched 60 degrees across the sky. It was recorded by astronomers in China, Japan, Germany, the Byzantine Empire, and the Middle East; Emperor Louis the Pious observed this appearance and devoted himself to prayer and penance, fearing that "by this token a change in the realm and the death of a prince are made known."

In 912 AD, Halley is recorded in the Annals of Ulster, which states "A dark and rainy year. A comet appeared."

=== 1066 ===
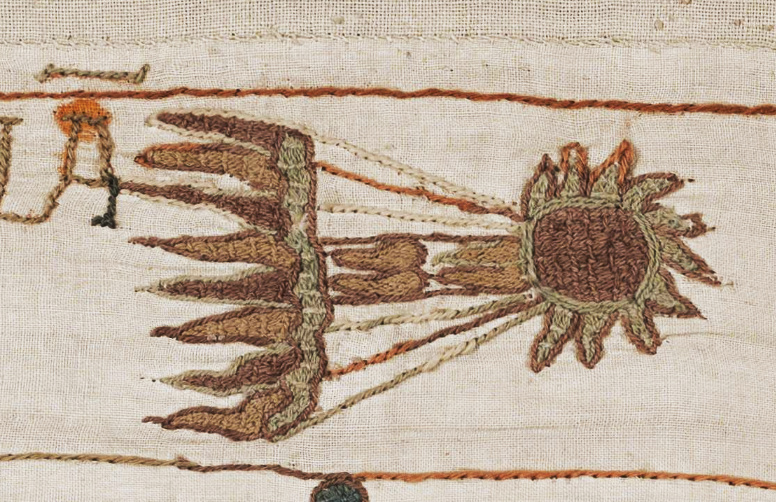
Halley's Comet in 1066 depicted on the Bayeux Tapestry

In 1066, the comet was seen in England and thought to be an omen: later that year Harold II of England died at the Battle of Hastings and William the Conqueror claimed the throne. The comet is represented on the Bayeux Tapestry and described in the tituli as a star. Surviving accounts from the period describe it as appearing to be four times the size of Venus, and shining with a light equal to a quarter of that of the Moon. Halley came within 0.10 au of Earth at that time.

This appearance of the comet is also noted in the Anglo-Saxon Chronicle. Eilmer of Malmesbury may have seen Halley in 989 and 1066, as recorded by William of Malmesbury:

Not long after, a comet, portending (they say) a change in governments, appeared, trailing its long flaming hair through the empty sky: concerning which there was a fine saying of a monk of our monastery called Æthelmær. Crouching in terror at the sight of the gleaming star, "You've come, have you?", he said. "You've come, you source of tears to many mothers. It is long since I saw you; but as I see you now you are much more terrible, for I see you brandishing the downfall of my country."

The Irish Annals of the Four Masters recorded the comet as "A star [that] appeared on the seventh of the Calends of May, on Tuesday after Little Easter, than whose light the brilliance or light of The Moon was not greater; and it was visible to all in this manner till the end of four nights afterwards." Chaco Native Americans in New Mexico may have recorded the 1066 apparition in their petroglyphs.

The Italo-Byzantine chronicle of Lupus the Protospatharios mentions that a "comet-star" appeared in the sky in the year 1067 (the chronicle is erroneous, as the event occurred in 1066, and by Robert he means William).

The Emperor Constantine Ducas died in the month of May, and his son Michael received the Empire. And in this year there appeared a comet star, and the Norman count Robert [sic] fought a battle with Harold, King of the English, and Robert was victorious and became king over the people of the English.

The Armenian chronicler, Matthew of Edessa, also noted the appearance of the comet, and its coincidence with a Turkic invasion saying:

"At the beginning of the year 515 of the Armenian era [March 5, 1066 – March 4, 1067] a comet appeared out of the eastern portion of the sky and traveled in a westerly direction. It appeared for one month and then disappeared. A number of days after this, it reappeared for one month and then disappeared. A number of days after this, it reappeared in the western portion of the sky at night; many who saw it said that it was the same comet which had appeared in the eastern portion before. During these times, the infidels marched forth and ravaged all of Armenia, consuming all the faithful by the sword and enslavement."

=== 1145–1378 ===
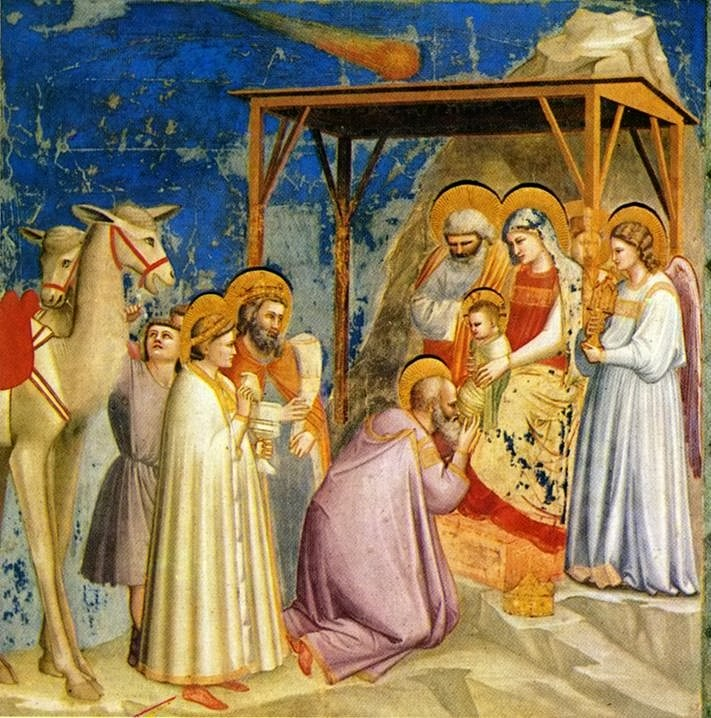
The Adoration of the Magi (circa 1305) by Giotto, who may have modelled the Star of Bethlehem on Halley's Comet, which had been sighted four years before this picture was painted.

The 1145 apparition may have been recorded by the monk Eadwine.

According to legend, Genghis Khan was inspired to turn his conquests toward Europe by the westward-seeming trajectory of the 1222 apparition. In Korea, the comet was reportedly visible during the daylight on 9 September 1222. In Vietnam, the comet was recorded visible in the south-west direction in August (September in solar calendar).

The 1301 apparition was visually spectacular, and may be the first that resulted in convincing portraits of a particular comet. The Florentine chronicler Giovanni Villani wrote that the comet left "great trails of fumes behind", and that it remained visible from September 1301 until January 1302. (Note: There are doubts about the latter date. It is generally accepted that the comet was visible from about mid September until about early November.) It was seen by the artist Giotto di Bondone, who represented the Star of Bethlehem as a fire-coloured comet in the Nativity section of his Arena Chapel cycle, completed in 1305. Giotto's depiction includes details of the coma, a sweeping tail, and the central condensation. According to the art historian Roberta Olson, it is much more accurate than other contemporary descriptions, and was not equaled in painting until the 19th century. Olson's identification of Halley's Comet in Giotto's Adoration of the Magi is what inspired the European Space Agency to name their mission to the comet Giotto, after the artist.

Halley's 1378 appearance is recorded in the Annales Mediolanenses as well as in East Asian sources.

=== 1456 ===
In 1456, the year of Halley's next apparition, the Ottoman Empire invaded the Kingdom of Hungary, culminating in the siege of Belgrade in July of that year. In a papal bull, Pope Callixtus III ordered special prayers be said for the city's protection. In 1470, the humanist scholar Bartolomeo Platina wrote in his Lives of the Popes that,

A hairy and fiery star having then made its appearance for several days, the mathematicians declared that there would follow grievous pestilence, dearth and some great calamity. Calixtus, to avert the wrath of God, ordered supplications that if evils were impending for the human race He would turn all upon the Turks, the enemies of the Christian name. He likewise ordered, to move God by continual entreaty, that notice should be given by the bells to call the faithful at midday to aid by their prayers those engaged in battle with the Turk.

Platina's account is not mentioned in official records. In the 18th century, a Frenchman further embellished the story, in anger at the Church, by claiming that the Pope had "excommunicated" the comet, though this story was most likely his own invention.

Halley's apparition of 1456 was also witnessed in Kashmir and depicted in great detail by Śrīvara, a Sanskrit poet and biographer to the Sultans of Kashmir. He read the apparition as a cometary portent of doom foreshadowing the imminent fall of Sultan Zayn al-Abidin (AD 1418/1420–1470).

Halley's apparition of 1456 has also been reported in copper plate inscription from the Vijayanagara period, preserved at the Mallikarjuna Swamy temple in Srisailam.

After witnessing a bright light in the sky that historians typically identify as Halley's Comet, Zara Yaqob, Emperor of Ethiopia from 1434 to 1468, founded the city of Debre Berhan (tr. City of Light) and made it his capital for the remainder of his reign.

=== 1531–1759 ===
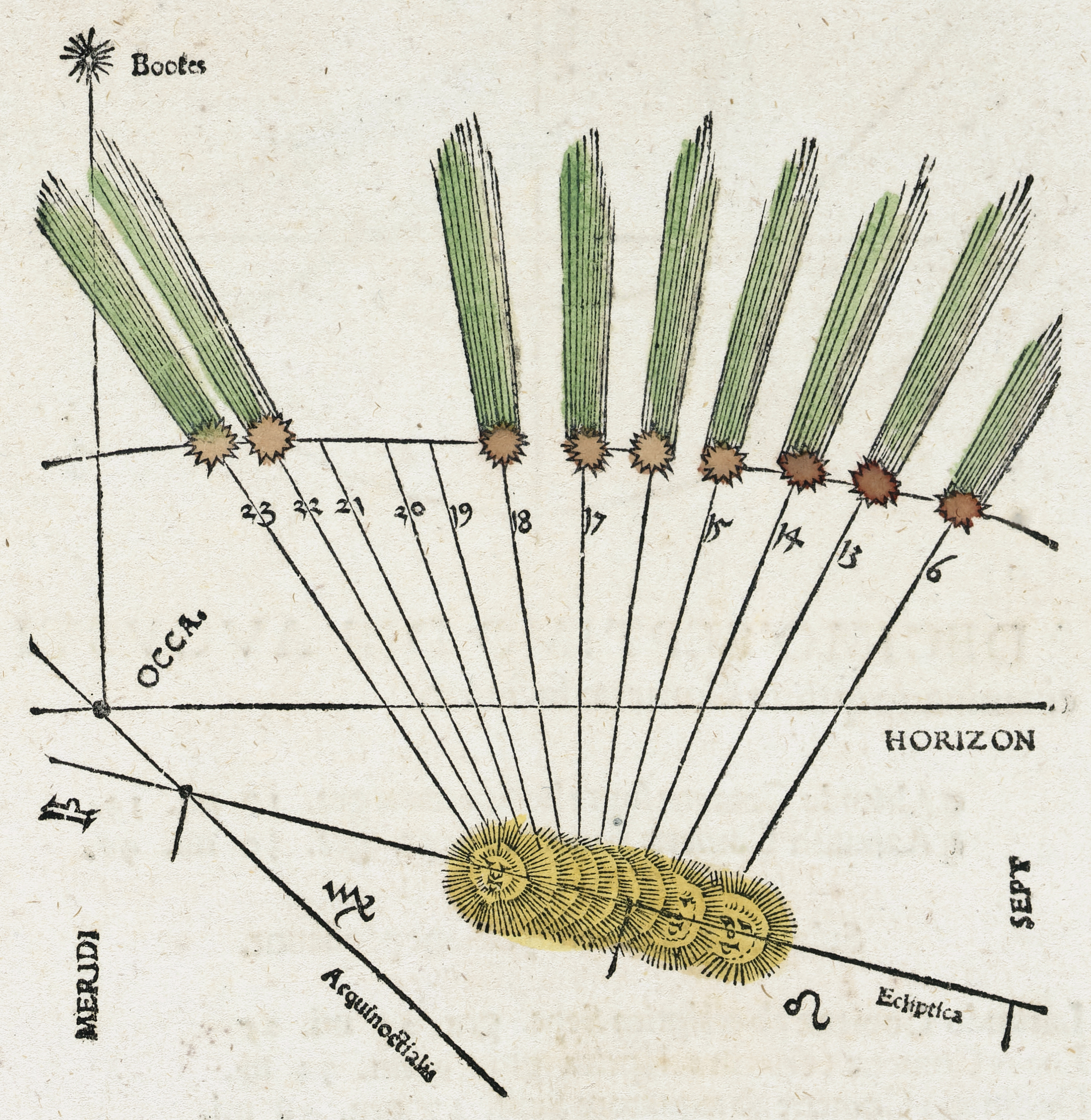
Illustration of the 1531 appearance in Petrus Apianus' Astronomicum Caesareum, noting that a comet's tail always points away from the sun

In the Sikh scriptures of the Guru Granth Sahib, the founder of the faith, Guru Nanak, makes reference to "a long star that has risen" at Ang 1110, and it is believed by some Sikh scholars to be a reference to Halley's appearance in 1531.

Halley's periodic returns have been subject to scientific investigation since the 16th century. Petrus Apianus and Girolamo Fracastoro described the comet's visit in 1531, with the former even including graphics in his publication. Through his observations, Apianus was able to prove that a comet's tail always points away from the Sun. The three apparitions from 1531 to 1682 were noted by Edmond Halley, enabling him to predict it would return. One key breakthrough occurred when Halley talked with Newton about his ideas of the laws of motion. Newton also helped Halley get John Flamsteed's data on the 1682 apparition. By studying data on the 1531, 1607, and 1682 comets, he came to the conclusion these were the same comet, and presented his findings in 1696. He predicted that the comet would return in 1758, and it appeared again in December 1758 and remained visible into 1759.

One difficulty was accounting for variations in the comet's orbital period, which was over a year longer between 1531 and 1607 than it was between 1607 and 1682. Newton had theorised that such delays were caused by the gravity of other comets, but Halley found that Jupiter and Saturn would cause the appropriate delays. In the decades that followed, more refined mathematics would be worked on, notable by Paris Observatory; the work on Halley also provided a boost to Newton and Kepler's rules for celestial motions. (See also computation of orbit.)

=== 1835 ===
At Markree Observatory in Ireland, Edward Joshua Cooper used a Cauchoix of Paris lens telescope with an aperture of 340 millimetres (13.3 in) to sketch Halley's comet in 1835. The same apparition was sketched by German astronomer Friedrich Wilhelm Bessel. Observations of streams of vapour prompted Bessel to propose that the jet forces of evaporating material could be great enough to significantly alter a comet's orbit.

Illustrations of prior comet appearances in the January 1910 Popular Science Monthly magazine

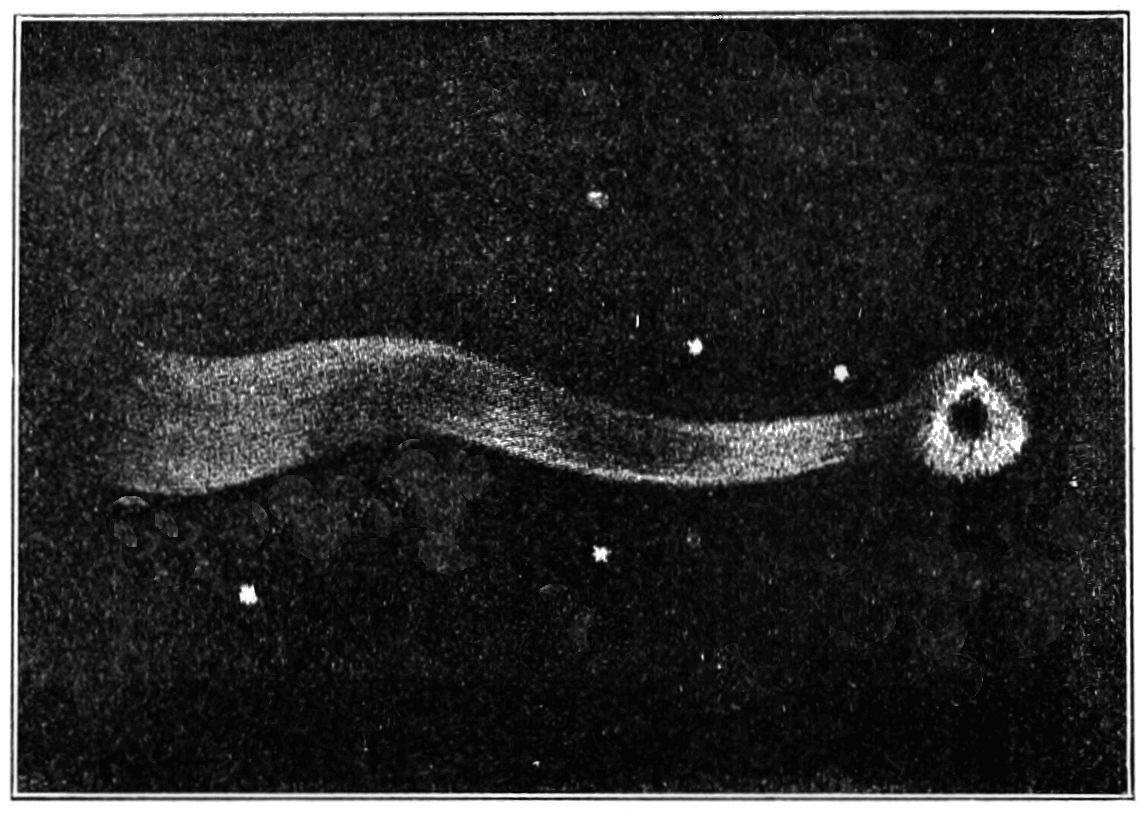
1682

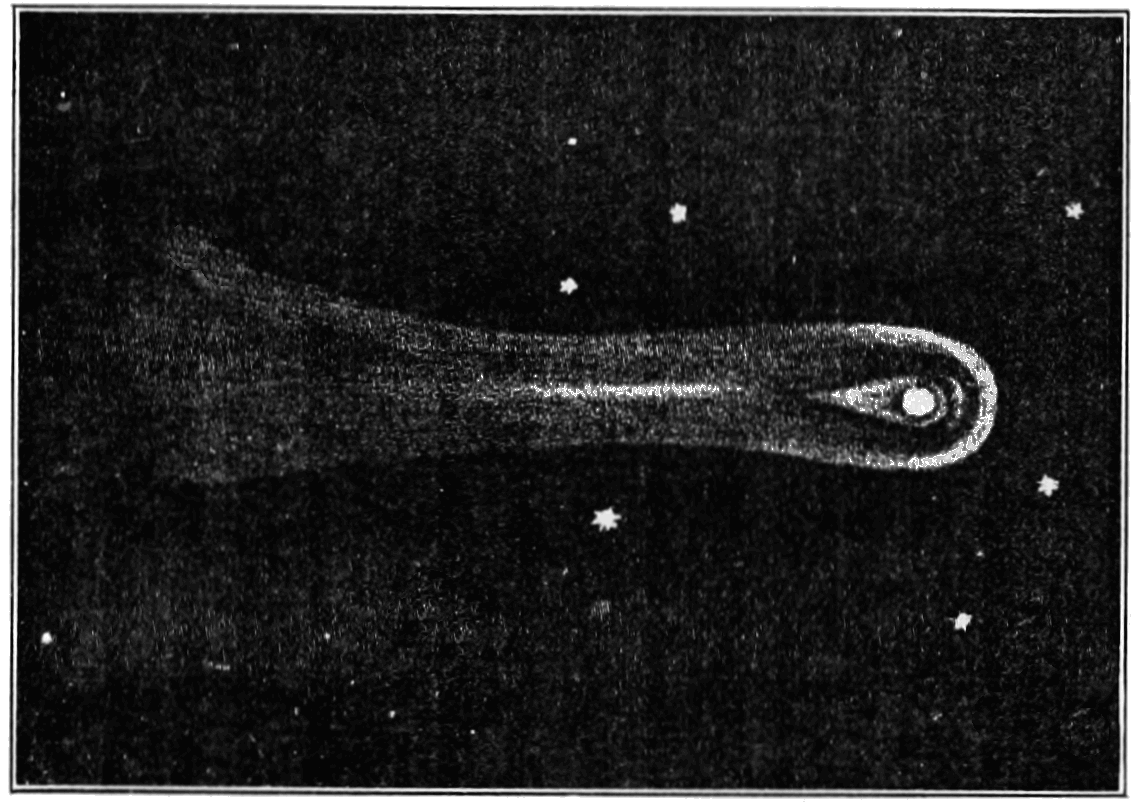
1759

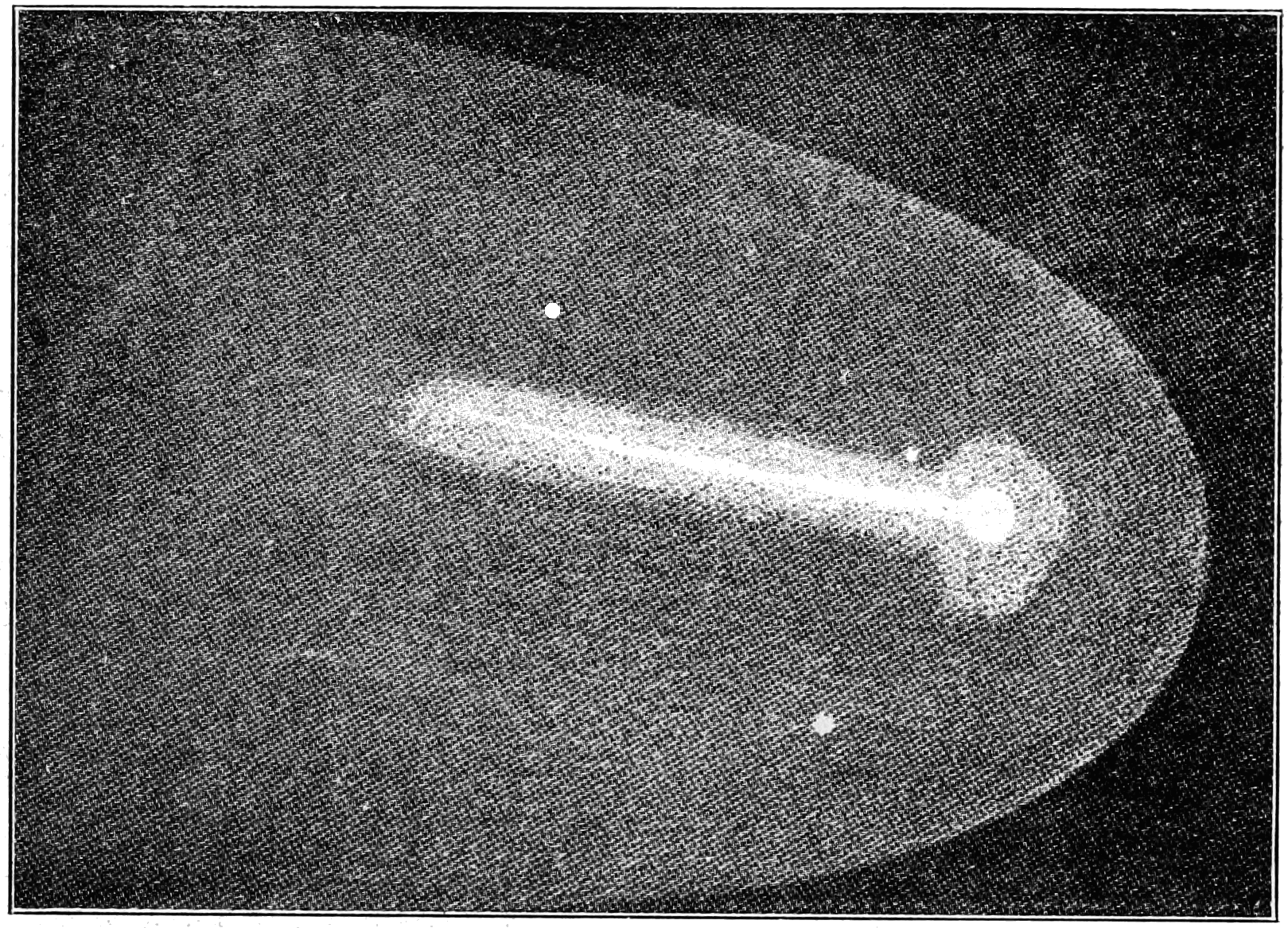
1835

An interview in 1910 of someone who had been a teenager at the time of the 1835 apparition had this to say:

When the comet was first seen, it appeared in the western sky, its head toward the north and tail towards the south, about horizontal and considerably above the horizon and quite a distance south of the Sun. It could be plainly seen directly after sunset every day, and was visible for a long time, perhaps a month ...

They go on to describe the comet's tail as being more broad and not as long as the Great Comet of 1843 they had also witnessed.

Famous astronomers across the world made observations starting August 1835, including Struve at Dorpat Observatory, and Sir John Herschel, who made of observations from the Cape of Good Hope. In the United States telescopic observations were made from Yale College. The new observations helped confirm early appearances of this comet including its 1456 and 1378 apparitions.

At Yale College in Connecticut, the comet was first reported on 31 August 1835 by the astronomers D. Olmstead and E. Loomis. In Canada, reports were made from Newfoundland and also Quebec. Reports came in from all over later in 1835 and often reported in newspapers of this time in Canada.

Several accounts of the 1835 apparition were made by observers who survived until the 1910 return, where increased interest in the comet led to them being interviewed.

The time to Halley's return in 1910 would be only 74.42 years, one of the shortest known periods of its return, which is calculated to be as long as 79 years owing to the effects of the planets.

At Paris Observatory Halley's Comet 1835 apparition was observed with a Lerebours telescope of 24.4 cm (9.6 in) aperture by the astronomer François Arago. Arago recorded polarimetric observations of Halley, and suggested that the tail might be sunlight reflecting off a sparsely distributed material; he had earlier made similar observations of Comet Tralles of 1819.

=== 1910 ===
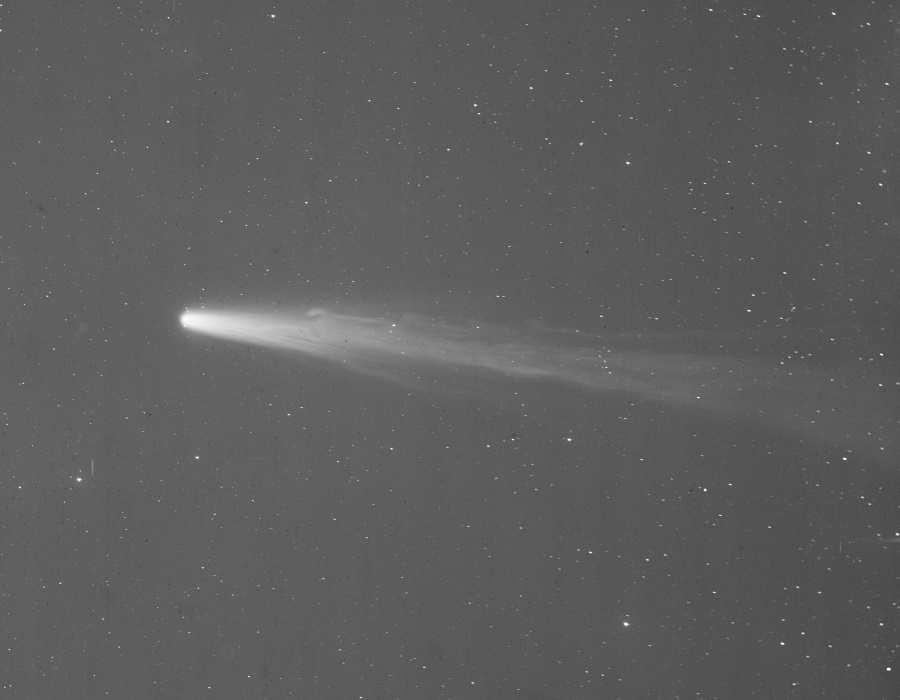
Halley's Comet in April 1910, photographed from Arequipa, Peru

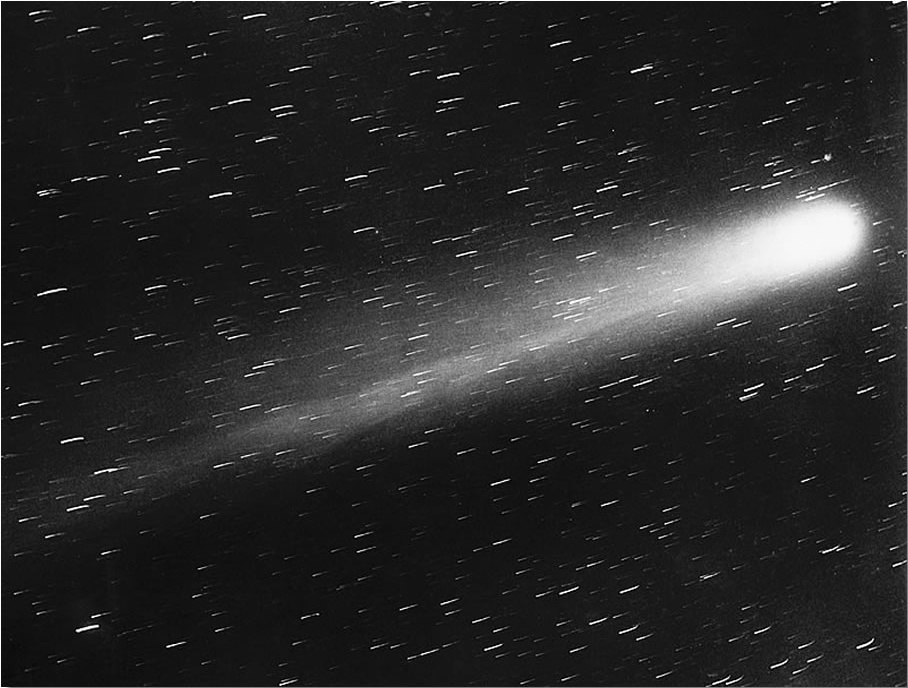
A photograph of Halley's Comet taken at Yerkes Observatory on 29 May 1910

The comet's 1910 approach brought it into naked-eye view around 10 April, and it reached perihelion on 20 April. It was the first approach of which photographs exist and the first for which spectroscopic data were obtained. Furthermore, the comet made a relatively close approach of 0.15 au, making it obvious to the naked eye. On 19 May, Earth passed through the tail of the comet. One of the substances discovered in the tail by spectroscopic analysis was the toxic gas cyanogen, which led to press speculation that life on Earth could be endangered. Despite reassurances from scientists that the gas would not present any danger, public panic buying of gas masks was recorded, and quack "anti-comet pills" were sold.

The comet added to the unrest in China on the eve of the Xinhai Revolution, which would end the Qing dynasty in 1911. James Hutson, a missionary in Sichuan at the time, recorded:

The people believe that it indicates calamity such as war, fire, pestilence, and a change of dynasty. In some places, on certain days the doors were unopened for half a day, no water was carried and many did not even drink water as it was rumoured that pestilential vapour was being poured down upon the earth from the comet.

The comet was also fertile ground for hoaxes. One that reached major newspapers claimed that the Sacred Followers, a supposed Oklahoma religious group, attempted to sacrifice a virgin to ward off the impending disaster but were stopped by the police.

The American satirist and writer Mark Twain was born on 30 November 1835, exactly two weeks after the comet's perihelion. In his autobiography, published in 1909, he said,

I came in with Halley's comet in 1835. It is coming again next year, and I expect to go out with it. It will be the greatest disappointment of my life if I don't go out with Halley's comet. The Almighty has said, no doubt: "Now here are these two unaccountable freaks; they came in together, they must go out together."

He died on 21 April 1910, the day after the comet's perihelion passage. The 1985 fantasy film The Adventures of Mark Twain was inspired by the quotation.

Halley's 1910 apparition occurred a few months after the Great Daylight Comet of 1910, which surpassed Halley in brilliance and was visible in broad daylight for a short period.

=== 1986 ===
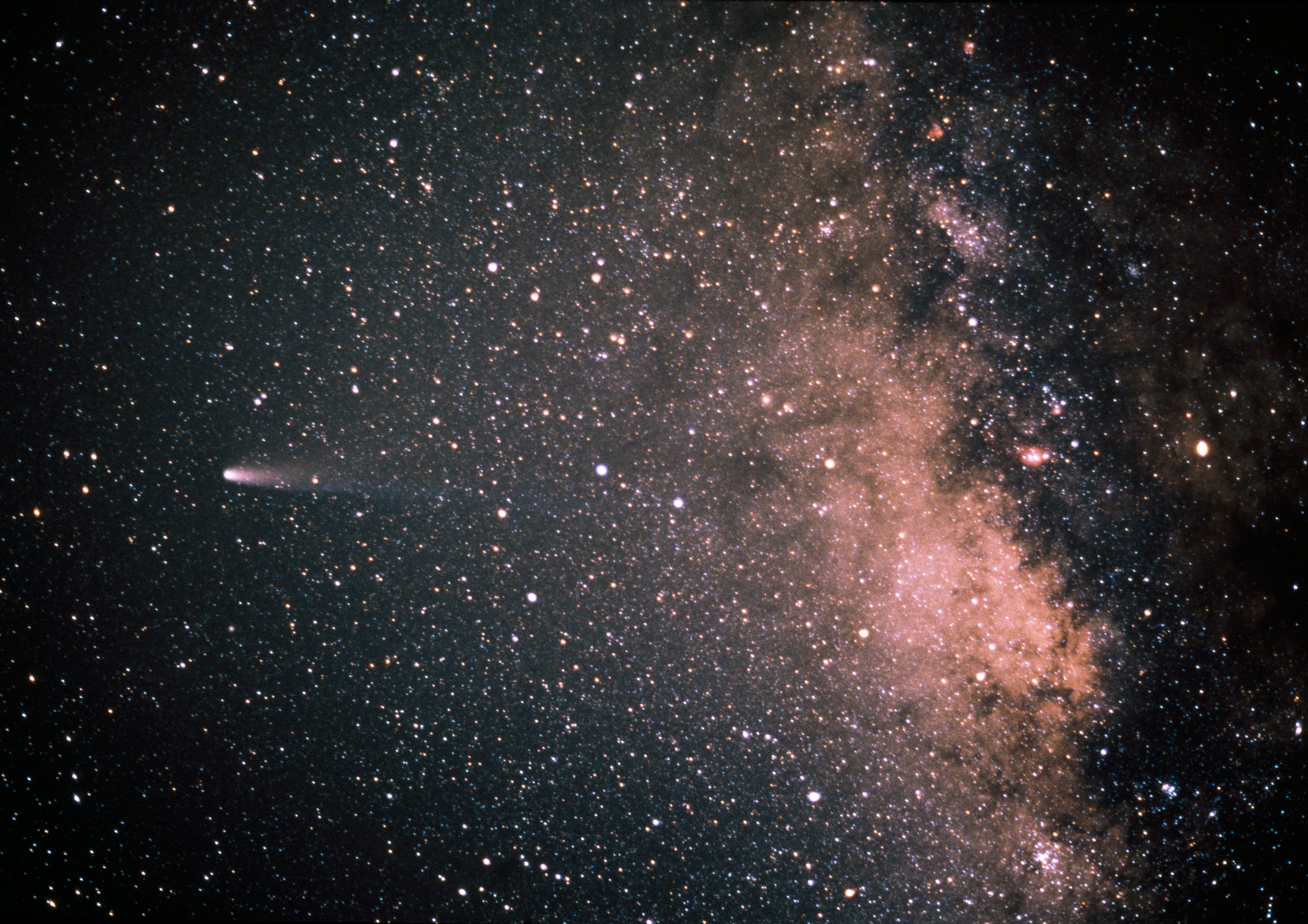
Halley's Comet as seen on 21 March 1986

Animation of 1P/Halley orbit – 1986 apparition
1P/Halley · Earth · Sun

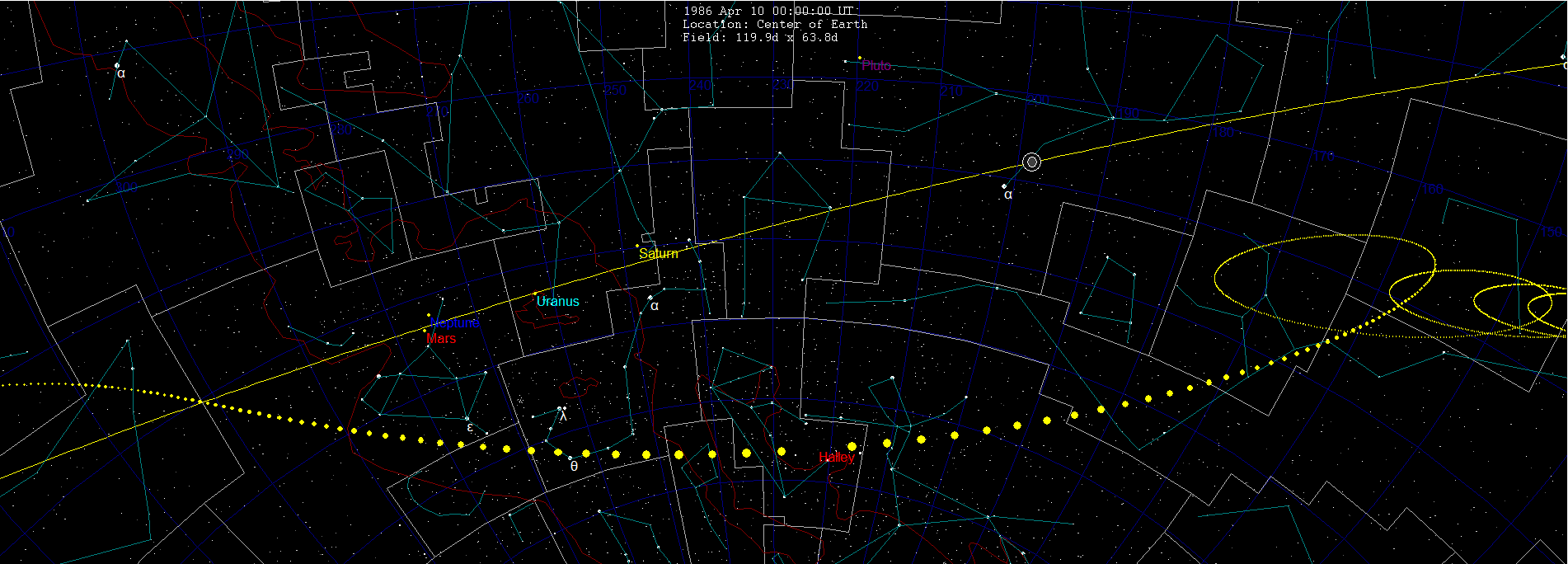
Daily motion across sky during the 1986 passage of Halley's Comet. The section of the ecliptic from Capricornus on the left to Leo on the right is shown.

The 1986 apparition of Halley's Comet was the least favourable on record. In February 1986, the comet and the Earth were on opposite sides of the Sun, creating the worst possible viewing circumstances for Earth observers during the previous 2,000 years. Halley's closest approach was 0.42 au. Additionally, increased light pollution from urbanisation caused many people to fail in their attempts to see the comet. With the help of binoculars, observation from areas outside cities was more successful. Furthermore, the comet appeared brightest when it was almost invisible from the northern hemisphere in March and April 1986, with the best opportunities occurring when the comet could be sighted close to the horizon at dawn and dusk if it was not obscured by clouds.

The approach of the comet was first detected by the astronomers David C. Jewitt and G. Edward Danielson on 16 October 1982, using the 5.1 m Hale Telescope at Mount Palomar and a CCD camera.

The first visual observation of the comet on its 1986 return was by an amateur astronomer, Stephen James O'Meara, on 24 January 1985. O'Meara used a home-built 610-millimetre (24 in) telescope on top of Mauna Kea to detect the magnitude 19.6 comet. The first to observe Halley's Comet with the naked eye during its 1986 apparition were Stephen Edberg (then serving as the coordinator for amateur observations at the NASA Jet Propulsion Laboratory) and Charles Morris on 8 November 1985.

The 1986 apparition gave scientists the opportunity to study the comet closely, and several probes were launched to do so. The Soviet Vega 1 probe began returning images of Halley on 4 March 1986, captured the first-ever image of its nucleus, and made its flyby on 6 March. It was followed by the Vega 2 probe, making its flyby on 9 March. On 14 March, the Giotto space probe, launched by the European Space Agency, made the closest pass of the comet's nucleus. There also were two Japanese probes: Suisei and Sakigake. Unofficially, the numerous probes became known as the Halley Armada.

Based on data retrieved by the largest ultraviolet space telescope of the time, Astron, in December 1985, a group of Soviet scientists developed a model of the comet's coma. The comet also was observed from space by the International Cometary Explorer (ICE). Originally launched as the International Sun-Earth Explorer 3, the spacecraft was renamed, and departed the Sun-Earth L_{1} Lagrangian point in 1982 to intercept the comets 21P/Giacobini-Zinner and Halley. ICE flew through the tail of Halley's Comet, coming within about 40.2 million km (25.0 million mi) of the nucleus on 28 March 1986.

Two U.S. Space Shuttle missions STS-51-L and STS-61-E had been scheduled to observe Halley's Comet from low Earth orbit. The STS-51-L mission carried the Shuttle-Pointed Tool for Astronomy (Spartan Halley) satellite, also called the Halley's Comet Experiment Deployable (HCED). The mission to capture the ultraviolet spectrum of the comet ended in disaster when the Space Shuttle Challenger disintegrated in flight and killed all seven astronauts onboard. Scheduled for March 1986, STS-61-E was a Columbia mission carrying the ASTRO-1 platform to study the comet, but the mission was cancelled following the Challenger disaster and ASTRO-1 would not fly until late 1990 on STS-35.

In Japan, the comet was observed by Emperor Hirohito, who was 84. He had seen it in 1910, when he was eight years old.

=== After 1986 ===
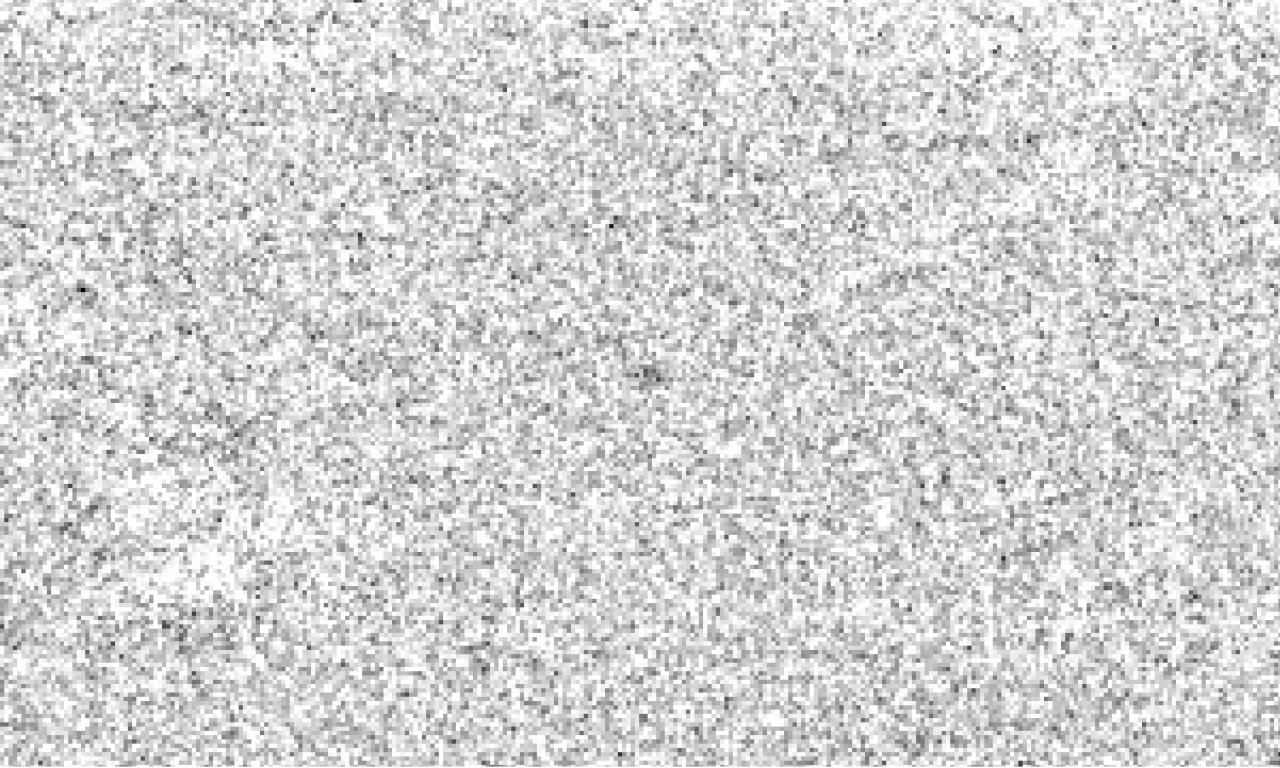
Halley's Comet observed in 2003 at 28 au from the Sun

On 12 February 1991, at a distance of 14.3 au (2,140 million km) from the Sun, Halley displayed an outburst that lasted for several months. The comet released dust with a total mass of about 10^{8} kg, which spread into an elongated cloud roughly 374,000 km (232,000 mi) by 269,000 km (167,000 mi) in size. The outburst likely started in December 1990, and then the comet brightened from about magnitude 25 to 19. Comets rarely show outburst activity at distances beyond 5 au from the Sun. Different mechanisms have been proposed for the outburst, ranging from interaction with the solar wind to a collision with an undiscovered asteroid. The most likely explanation is a combination of two effects, the polymerisation of hydrogen cyanide and a phase transition of amorphous water ice, which raised the temperature of the nucleus enough for some of the more volatile compounds on its surface to sublime.

Halley was most recently observed in 2003 by three of the Very Large Telescopes at Paranal, Chile, when Halley's magnitude was 28.2. The telescopes observed Halley, at the faintest and farthest any comet had ever been imaged, to verify a method for finding very faint trans-Neptunian objects. Astronomers are now able to observe the comet at any point in its orbit.

On 9 December 2023, Halley's Comet reached the farthest and slowest point in its orbit from the Sun, when it was travelling at 0.91 km/s (2,000 mph) with respect to the Sun.

=== 2061 ===
Animation of 1P/Halley orbit – 2061 apparition Sun · Venus · Earth · Jupiter · 1P/Halley

The next perihelion of Halley's Comet is predicted for 28 July 2061, when it will be better positioned for observation than during the 1985–1986 apparition, as it will be on the same side of the Sun as Earth. The closest approach to Earth will be one day after perihelion. It is expected to have an apparent magnitude of −0.3, compared with only +2.1 for the 1986 apparition. On 9 September 2060, Halley will pass within 0.98 au (147,000,000 km) of Jupiter, and then on 20 August 2061, will pass within 0.0543 au (8,120,000 km) of Venus.

=== 2134 ===
Halley will come to perihelion on 27 March 2134. Then on 7 May 2134, Halley will pass within 0.092 au (13,800,000 km) of Earth. Its apparent magnitude is expected to be −2.0.

=== List of apparitions ===
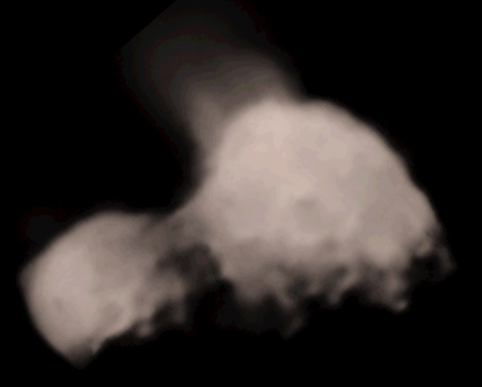
Halley as seen from Vega 2

Halley's calculations enabled the comet's earlier appearances to be found in the historical record. The following table sets out the astronomical designations for every apparition of Halley's Comet from 240 BC, the earliest documented sighting.

In the designations, "1P/" refers to Halley's Comet; the first periodic comet discovered. The number represents the year, with negatives representing BC. The letter-number combination indicates which it was of the comets observed for a given segment of the year, divided into 24 equal parts. The Roman numeral indicates which comet past perihelion it was for a given year, while the lower-case letter indicates which comet it was for a given year overall. The perihelion dates farther from the present are approximate, mainly because of uncertainties in the modelling of non-gravitational effects. Perihelion dates of 1531 and earlier are in the Julian calendar, while perihelion dates 1607 and after are in the Gregorian calendar. The perihelion dates for some of the early apparitions (particularly before 837 AD) are uncertain by a couple of days. While Halley's Comet usually peaks at around 0th magnitude, there are indications that the comet got considerably brighter than that in the past.

Return cycle	Designation	Year BC/AD	Gap (years)	Date of perihelion	Observation interval (Note: Prior to the invention of the telescope in the 17th century, this is the time when the comet was visible to the naked eye.)	Earth approach	Maximum brightness	Description
−29	1P/−239 K1	240 BC	–	30 March	May – June			First confirmed sighting
−28	1P/−163 U1	164 BC	76	17 November?	October – November			Seen by Babylonians
−27	1P/−86 Q1	87 BC	77	2 August	9 July – 24 August			Seen by the Babylonians and Chinese
−26	1P/−11 Q1	12 BC	75	5 October	26 August – 20 October	0.16 au	−5 mag	Watched by Chinese for two months
−25	1P/66 B1	66	77	26 January	31 January – 10 April		−7 mag	May be the comet described in Josephus's The Jewish War as "A comet of the kind called Xiphias, because their tails appear to represent the blade of a sword" that supposedly heralded the destruction of the Second Temple in 70 AD.
−24	1P/141 F1	141	75	22 March	March 27 – late April		−4 mag	Described by the Chinese as bluish-white in colour
−23	1P/218 H1	218	77	17 May	early May – mid June		−4 mag	Described by the Roman historian Dion Cassius as "a very fearful star"
−22	1P/295 J1	295	77	20 April	1–30 May		−3 mag	Seen in China, but not spectacular
−21	1P/374 E1	374	79	17 February	4 March – 2 April	0.09 au	−3 mag	Comet passed 13.5 million kilometres from Earth.
−20	1P/451 L1	451	77	24 June	10 June – 15 August		−3 mag	Comet appeared before the defeat of Attila the Hun at the Battle of Chalons.
−19	1P/530 Q1	530	79	26 September	29 August – 23 September		−3 mag	Noted in China and Europe, but not spectacular
−18	1P/607 H1	607	77	13 March	March – April	0.09 au	−4 mag	Comet passed 13.5 million kilometres from Earth.
−17	1P/684 R1	684	77	28 October	September – October		−2 mag	First known Japanese records of the comet. Attempts have been made to connect an ancient Maya depiction of God L to the event.
−16	1P/760 K1	760	76	22 May	May 17 – mid June		−2 mag	Seen in China, at the same time as another comet
−15	1P/837 F1	837	77	28 February	22 March – 28 April	0.033 au	−3 mag	Closest-ever approach to the Earth (5 million km). Tail stretched halfway across the sky. Appeared as bright as Venus.
−14	1P/912 J1	912	75	9 July	July		−2 mag	Seen briefly in China and Japan
−13	1P/989 N1	989	77	9 September	August – September		−1 mag	Seen in China, Japan, and (possibly) Korea
−12	1P/1066 G1	1066	77	23 March	3 April – 7 June	0.10 au	−4 mag	Seen for over two months in China. Recorded in England and depicted on the later Bayeux Tapestry which portrayed the events of that year.
−11	1P/1145 G1	1145	79	21 April	15 April – 6 July		−2 mag	Depicted on the Eadwine Psalter, with the remark that such "hairy stars" appeared rarely, "and then as a portent"
−10	1P/1222 R1	1222	77	30 September	3 September – 8 October		−1 mag	Described by Japanese astronomers as being "as large as the half Moon... Its colour was white but its rays were red"
−9	1P/1301 R1	1301	79	24 October	1 September – 31 October		−1 mag	Seen by Giotto di Bondone and included in his painting The Adoration of the Magi. Chinese astronomers compared its brilliance to that of the first-magnitude star Procyon.
−8	1P/1378 S1	1378	77	9 November	26 September – 11 October		−1 mag	Passed within 10 degrees of the north celestial pole, more northerly than at any time during the past 2000 years. This is the last appearance of the comet for which eastern records are better than Western ones.
−7	1P/1456 K1	1456	78	9 June	27 May – 8 July		0 mag	Observed in Italy by Paolo Toscanelli, who said its head was "as large as the eye of an ox", with a tail "fan-shaped like that of a peacock". Arabs said the tail resembled a Turkish scimitar. Turkish forces attacked Belgrade.
−6	1P/1531 P1	1531	75	25 August	1 August – 8 September		−1 mag	Seen by Peter Apian, who noted that its tail always pointed away from the Sun. This sighting was included in Halley's table.
−5	1P/1607 S1	1607	76	27 October	21 September – 26 October		0 mag	Seen by Johannes Kepler. This sighting was included in Halley's table.
−4	1P/1682 Q1	1682	75	15 September	15 August – 21 September		0 mag	Seen by Edmond Halley at Islington
−3	1P/1758 Y1; 1759 I	1758	76	13 March	25 December 1758 – 22 June 1759		−1 mag	Return predicted by Halley. First seen by Johann Palitzsch on 25 December 1758.
−2	1P/1835 P1; 1835 III	1835	77	16 November	5 August 1835 – 19 May 1836		0 mag	First seen at the Observatory of the Roman College in August. Studied by John Herschel at the Cape of Good Hope.
−1	1P/1909 R1; 1910 II; 1909c	1910	75	20 April	25 August 1909 – 16 June 1911	0.151 au	0 mag	Photographed for the first time. Earth passed through the comet's tail on 20 May.
0	1P/1982 U1; 1986 III; 1982i	1986	76	9 February	Astronomers are now able to observe the comet at every point in its orbit.	0.417 au	+2 mag	Reached perihelion on 9 February, closest to Earth (63 million km) on 10 April. Nucleus photographed by the European space probe Giotto and the Soviet probes Vega 1 and 2.
1		2061	75	28 July		0.477 au	Estimated to be -0.3	Next return with perihelion on 28 July 2061 and Earth approach one day later on 29 July 2061
2		2134	73	27 March		0.092 au	Estimated to be -2.0	Subsequent return with perihelion on 27 March 2134, and Earth approach on 7 May 2134
3		2209	75	3 February		0.515 au		Best-fit for February 2209 perihelion passage and April Earth approach

== See also ==
- Kepler orbit – Celestial orbit whose trajectory is a conic section in the orbital plane
- List of Halley-type comets

== Bibliography ==
- Goodrich, Richard J. (2023). Comet Madness. How the 1910 Return of Halley's Comet (Almost) Destroyed Civilization. Prometheus Books. p. 188. ISBN 978-1-63388-857-9.
- Grier, David Alan (2005). "The First Anticipated Return: Halley's Comet 1758". When Computers Were Human. Princeton: Princeton University Press. ISBN 0-691-09157-9.
- Kronk, Gary W. (1999). Cometography, vol. 1: Ancient-1799. Cambridge University Press. ISBN 978-0-521-58504-0.
- Lancaster-Brown, Peter (1985). Halley & His Comet. Blandford Press. ISBN 0-7137-1447-6.
- Lequeux, James (2015). François Arago: A 19th Century French Humanist and Pioneer in Astrophysics. Springer. ISBN 978-3-319-20723-0.
- Milbrath, Susan (1999). Star Gods of the Maya: Astronomy in Art, Folklore, and Calendars. The Linda Schele Series in Maya and Pre-Columbian Studies. University of Texas Press. doi:10.7560/752252. ISBN 978-0-292-79793-2.
- Needham, Joseph (1995) [1959]. "Comets, meteors, and meteorites". Science and Civilisation in China: Volume 3, Mathematics and the Sciences of the Heavens and the Earth. Cambridge University Press. pp. 430–433. ISBN 978-0-521-05801-8.
- Rayner, John D. (1998). A Jewish Understanding of the World. Berghahn Books. pp. 108–111. ISBN 1-57181-973-8.
- Sagan, Carl; Druyan, Ann (1985). Comet. Random House. ISBN 0-394-54908-2.
- Schmude, Richard M. (2010). Comets and How to Observe Them. Springer. p. 3. ISBN 978-1-4419-5790-0.
- Shayler, David J.; Burgess, Colin (2007). "Ending of Eras". NASA's Scientist-Astronauts. Praxis. ISBN 978-0-387-21897-7.
- Siddiqi, Asif A. (2018). Beyond Earth: A Chronicle of Deep Space Exploration. United States: NASA History Program Office. pp. 149–150. ISBN 978-1-62683-042-4.
- Yeomans, Donald Keith (1991). Comets: A Chronological History of Observation, Science, Myth, and Folklore. Wiley and Sons. pp. 260–261. ISBN 0-471-61011-9.

Numbered comets
Previous (periodic comet navigator)	1P/Halley	Next; 2P/Encke
