= Apianus (crater) =

Crater on the Moon

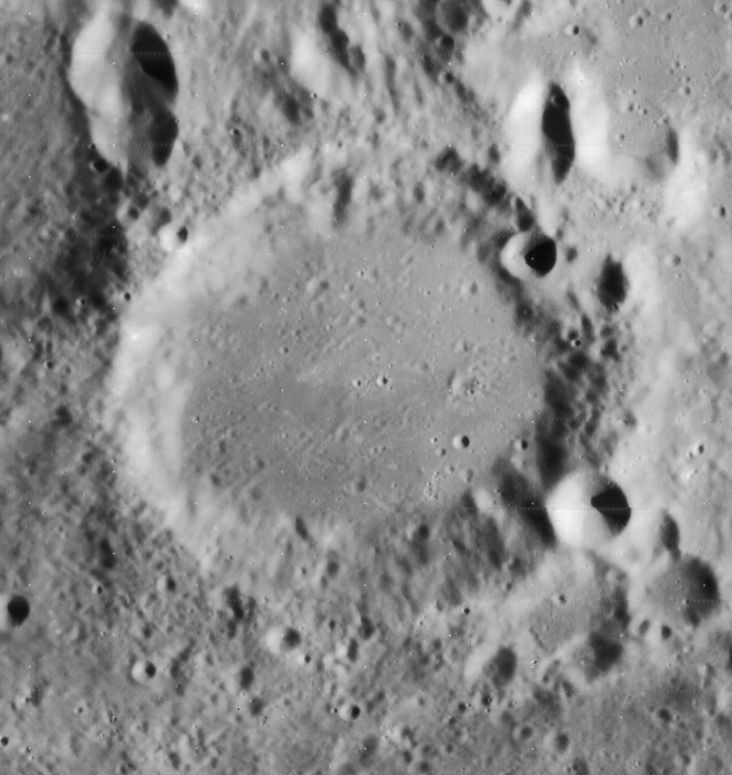
- Lunar Orbiter 4 image
- Coordinates: 26.9°S 7.9°E
- Diameter: 63.44 km (39.42 mi)
- Depth: 2.08 km (1.29 mi)
- Colongitude: 356° at sunrise
- Formation: Nectarian
- Eponym: Petrus Apianus

Apianus is a lunar impact crater that is located on the rugged south-central highlands of the Moon. It is located to the northeast of the crater Aliacensis, and to the northwest of Poisson. The worn crater Krusenstern is attached to the west-northwestern rim.

In the lunar geologic timescale, this formation is from the Nectarian period, 3.92 to 3.85 billion years ago. The outer wall of the crater has been worn and eroded by subsequent impacts, and a pair of small craterlets overlay the rim to the southeast and northeast. The central crater is 63 kilometers in diameter and 2,080 meters deep. The craterlet on the southeast rim, Apianus B, is a member of a cluster of co-joined craterlets that includes Apianus T and Apianus U. The interior floor of the central crater is relatively smooth and lacks a central peak, although the surface appears somewhat convex. Only a few tiny craterlets mark the surface.

This crater is named after 16th century German mathematician and astronomer Petrus Apianus (1495-1552). It was formally adopted by the International Astronomical Union in 1935. Its name was added to lunar nomenclature by Italian astronomer Giovanni Battista Riccioli in 1651.

== Satellite craters ==
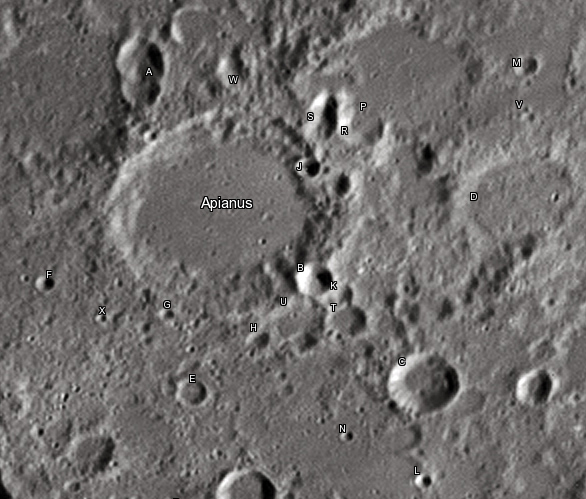
Apianus and its satellite craters taken from Earth in 2012 at the University of Hertfordshire's Bayfordbury Observatory with the telescopes Meade LX200 14" and Lumenera Skynyx 2-1

By convention these features are identified on lunar maps by placing the letter on the side of the crater midpoint that is closest to Apianus.

Apianus	Latitude	Longitude	Diameter	Ref
A	25.7° S	6.6° E	13.11 km	WGPSN
B	27.4° S	9.0° E	10.21 km	WGPSN
C	28.1° S	10.5° E	19.64 km	WGPSN
D	26.1° S	10.7° E	33.66 km	WGPSN
E	28.8° S	8.2° E	8.39 km	WGPSN
F	28.1° S	6.4° E	5.39 km	WGPSN
G	28.1° S	7.7° E	4.02 km	WGPSN
H	28.1° S	8.7° E	6.57 km	WGPSN
J	26.3° S	8.6° E	6.71 km	WGPSN
K	27.4° S	9.3° E	6.44 km	WGPSN
L	29.1° S	10.9° E	4.67 km	WGPSN
M	24.7° S	10.3° E	6.98 km	WGPSN
N	28.8° S	9.9° E	3.46 km	WGPSN
P	25.2° S	9.2° E	41.59 km	WGPSN
R	25.7° S	8.9° E	13.1 km	WGPSN
S	25.6° S	8.5° E	23.96 km	WGPSN
T	27.7° S	9.5° E	11.52 km	WGPSN
U	27.9° S	9.0° E	16.82 km	WGPSN
V	25.3° S	10.5° E	3.2 km	WGPSN
W	25.5° S	7.4° E	9.68 km	WGPSN
X	28.3° S	7.1° E	3.1 km	WGPSN

== See also ==
- 19139 Apian, asteroid
