= Astronomicum Caesareum =

Astronomy book by Petrus Apianus

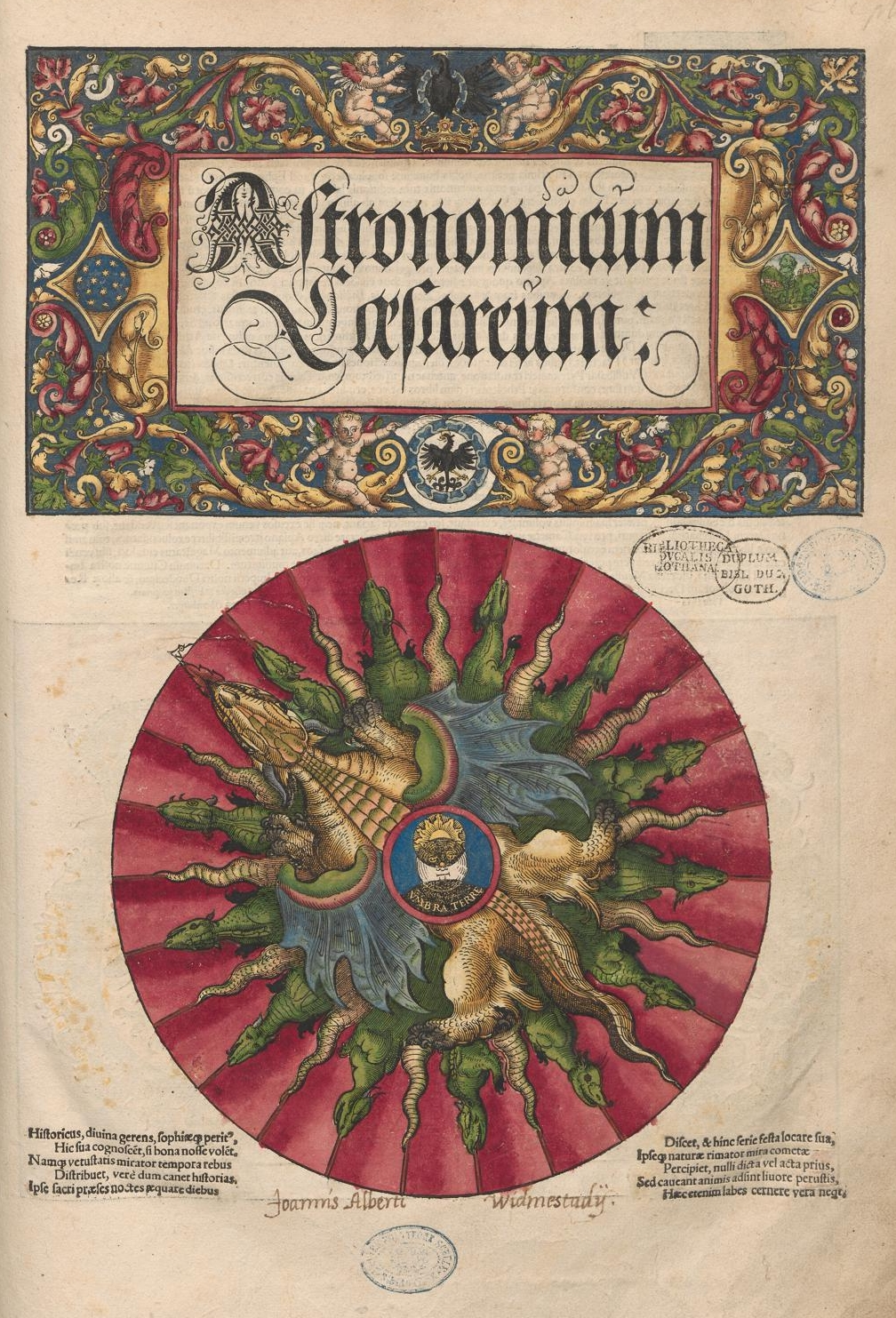
Cover page of the 1540 edition

Astronomicum Caesareum (Astronomy of the Caesars; also translated as The Emperor's Astronomy) is a book by Petrus Apianus first published in 1540.

Astronomicum was initially published in 1540. Charles V, Holy Roman Emperor, and his brother Ferdinand I, Holy Roman Emperor, both commissioned the work. It was printed at Apianus's press in Ingolstadt, Bavaria, and took eight years to produce. It expanded and changed when reprinted; the final version has 55 leaves. Apianus evidently changed his plans while producing a single edition. A volvelle in one version of Astronomicum has "an entirely irrelevant base of an astrolabe" underneath, suggesting that he considered creating one and then abandoned the idea.

Twenty-one of its 36 woodcuts are volvelles. Astronomicum's volvelles rely on a geocentric model of the universe. However, despite the false science on which they depended, knowledgeable readers could still use them to predict planetary movements. Nicolaus Copernicus published De revolutionibus orbium coelestium shortly after Astronomicum appeared, which began a transition to heliocentrism as the standard astronomical model.

Although other 16th-century books used volvelles, Astronomicum's are distinctive because they take precedence over the book's text, as opposed to serving as illustrations. According to Ronald Brashear and Daniel Lewis, Astronomicum is "really a scientific calculating instrument as much as a book".

A 1997 study reported that 111 copies of the book existed. Tycho Brahe bought one copy in 1599 which is in the collection of a library in Gotha, likely Forschungsbibliothek Gotha.

== Sources ==
- Brashear, Ronald; Lewis, Daniel (2001). Star Struck: One Thousand Years of the Art and Science of Astronomy. Huntington Library; University of Washington Press. ISBN 0-295-98097-4. OCLC 45393510.
- Christianson, Scott (2012). 100 Diagrams that Changed the World: From the Earliest Cave Paintings to the Innovation of the iPod. Plume. ISBN 978-0-452-29877-4. OCLC 778419237.
- Gingerich, Owen (1994). "Early Astronomical Books with Moving Parts". In Katz, William A. (ed.). A History of Book Illustration: 29 Points of View. Scarecrow Press. ISBN 0-8108-2742-5. OCLC 29595405.
- Helfand, Jessica (2002). Reinventing the Wheel. Princeton Architectural Press. ISBN 1-56898-338-7. OCLC 48817585.
