= Rabbi Levi =

Rabbi Levi can refer to:

- Levi ben Sisi, a rabbi who lived during the transition between tannaim and amoraim
- Levi II, a third generation amora
- Gersonides (or Rabbi Levi ben Gershon), medieval rabbi and thinker
- Rabbi Levi (crater), an impact crater on the Moon
