= Lindenau =

Lindenau may refer to:

- Lindenau, Germany
- Lindenau (Leipzig), a quarter of the city of Leipzig, Saxony, Germany
- Lindenau, New Jersey, US
- Lindenau, Texas, US, an unincorporated community
- Lindenau (crater), a lunar crater

== People with the surname ==
- Bernhard von Lindenau, a 19th-century German astronomer
