= Laudomia Forteguerri =

Italian poet

Laudomia Forteguerri (1515–1555, Siena, Italy) was an Italian poet and a member of one of the most powerful families in the sixteenth-century Republic of Siena. She is considered by some historians to be Italy's earliest lesbian writer, and she was famous for her beauty, wit, and intelligence. In January 1553, Forteguerri led a group of women in helping with the construction of a defensive bastion to protect her city against an anticipated attack from Imperial Spanish forces. The attack and siege that followed in 1554–55 ultimately lead to the fall of the independent Republic. Forteguerri became a legendary figure in Sienese history and her legacy has lived on long after her death.

== Early life ==
Laudomia Forteguerri was born in 1515 to Alessandro di Niccodemo Forteguerri and Virginia di Giuli Pecci. At her baptism it was observed that Forteguerri was "unique in the world and of rare beauty"—a fitting entrance into society for a woman who would be noted for her exceptional charm, intelligence, and beauty throughout her life. Laudomia Forteguerri was the child of her father's second wife, and she had one older half-brother, Niccodemo Forteguerri, who would become a prominent Sienese captain in the siege of Siena. Alessandro Forteguerri married Virginia Pecci in 1515 after the death of Niccodemo's mother, and the couple had at least seven children together in addition to Laudomia. Forteguerri's parents were members of some of the most powerful feudal families of sixteenth-century Siena; the Forteguerri and Pecci clans were highly influential, and together they controlled much of the civic and ecclesiastical life of the city. Both of Forteguerri's parents were descendants of Siena's imperial counts and were members of the Noveschi, a powerful group that had ruled Siena in the thirteenth and fourteenth centuries. Thus Forteguerri enjoyed a highly elite status within the city.

Forteguerri married Giulio di Alessandro Colombini (a member of another powerful Noveschi family) in her late teens, and while the exact date of the wedding is uncertain, it is known to have occurred before 1535. Although it was common for many women in Northwestern Europe during the Renaissance to delay marriage until their mid-to-late twenties and to marry a man close to their own age, Italian noblewomen often married somewhat younger, as Forteguerri did. Italian noblewomen also frequently married men who were up to ten years their senior, thus it was not at all unusual that Giulio was eight years older than the teenaged Forteguerri. Laudomia and Giulio had three children together, Olimpia Antonia (born in 1535), Antonia Anna (born in 1537), and Allesandro Antonio (born in 1539), and Giulio died some time around 1542. After being widowed, in 1544 Forteguerri remarried to Petruccio Petrucci, a member of the powerful ruling family of Siena during this era. Remarriage was very common during the Renaissance, but widows often had more latitude in their marital choices, so it is perhaps telling that Forteguerri's new husband was much closer to her own age, at just two years her senior. As was the custom during this time, Laudomia's children by Giulio were sent to live with the Colombini family; she and her new husband had no children together, and little is known regarding their married life.

== Influence in Sienese society ==
Forteguerri was an active and influential figure in Sienese society, and one historian even claims that she was the first woman whose poetry was discussed openly in an academic setting during a 1541 lecture held by Alessandro Piccolomini at the Infiamatti—a respected literary academy in Padua. However Forteguerri did not only create esteemed literature, but she also inspired it; Forteguerri was famous for her beauty and intellect, and she became a muse for several prominent Sienese writers. The first known text to feature Forteguerri is Marc’Antonio Piccolomini’s Ragionamento, where she takes part in a philosophical (and borderline heretical) dialogue with fellow noblewomen intellectuals Girolama Carli de' Piccolomini and Franzi Marzi. The Piccolomini family was highly influential in Siena during this time, and Marc'Antonio helped found the Accademia degli Intronati, which served as the center of Sienese aristocratic cultural and intellectual life during the mid-sixteenth-century . The Ragionamento was thus highly influential within Sienese academic circles. Many scholars believe that this work was not based on an actual event, as Piccolomini claimed it was, but that it was rather constructed by the author so as to alleviate rumors of heresy surrounding the Piccolomini family. Although it is unclear whether the heretical Calvinist views that Forteguerri espouses in this dialogue are representative of her actual beliefs, or if she is used by Piccolomini simply as a foil for the orthodox portrayal of Girolama Piccolomini, Forteguerri is undoubtedly presented as a strong woman with a refined intellect in this literary work.

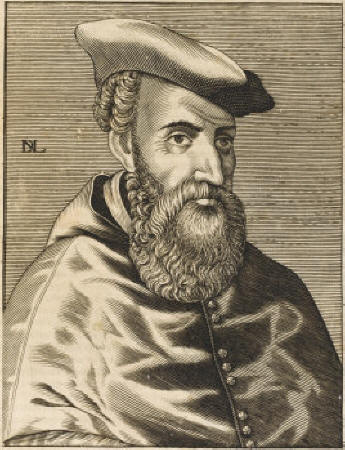
Alessandro Piccolomini

Marc’Antonio Piccolomini's cousin, the philosopher and humanist Alessandro Piccolomini, was also inspired by Forteguerri. He was infatuated with the brilliant poet, and in spite of Forteguerri's apparent lack of romantic interest in him, she would be viewed as Piccolomini's great love throughout his life. When Forteguerri lamented the fact that, as a woman, she was barred from studying the science of astronomy, he wrote De la sfera del mondo and De le stele fisse (On the Sphere of the World and On the Fixed Stars), an influential two-part compendium of information on the subject that he dedicated to her. This compendium is considered an important text in the history of astronomy, as it marked the first time that stellar luminosity was classified alphabetically (as it continues to be today) and it contained the earliest complete star atlas that historians have been able to locate. It was also one of the first texts on astronomy that was widely accessible, as Piccolomini's chose not to publish this work in Latin—the standard language of academic literature during this period—but in Italian, so that Forteguerri would be able to fully comprehend it. He also composed the impressive philosophical work, On the Organization of the Entire Life of a Man Born Noble and in a Free City, as a baptismal gift for Forteguerri's son, Allesandro Antonio Colombini, who was also Piccolomini's godson.

Piccolomini was by far the most zealous supporter of Forteguerri's public image and literary works, and his glowing analysis of her sonnets in his 1541 lecture in Padua would later be published and widely circulated. Perhaps the most important aspect of this lecture was Piccolomini's "outing" of Forteguerri, as all of the sonnets he discusses are dedicated to Forteguerri's great love, Margaret of Austria. But rather than exhibit jealousy at Forteguerri's expression of love for another, Piccolomini celebrates it, lauding her poetry as "an example of a most ardent Love that exists… between two most unique and divine women." This is particularly surprising given Piccolomini's resentment of Forteguerri's second marriage in 1544—an event that wounded him so deeply that he would never again mention Forteguerri by name in his work (though some of his later poems speak rather dramatically of the "betrayal" of his beloved). It seems clear that Piccolomini's acceptance of Forteguerri's expressions of same-sex love was based on his belief that she was not experiencing true physical desire, but rather a divine (and entirely platonic) love for Margaret. However, while contemporary Sienese poets such as Emanuele Grimaldi, Benedetto Varchi, and Agnolo Firenzuola would largely echo Piccolomini's heteronormative view of Forteguerri's love for Margaret, the relationship between these two women cannot be written off as merely platonic.

== Sonnets, Sapphism, and Margaret of Austria ==
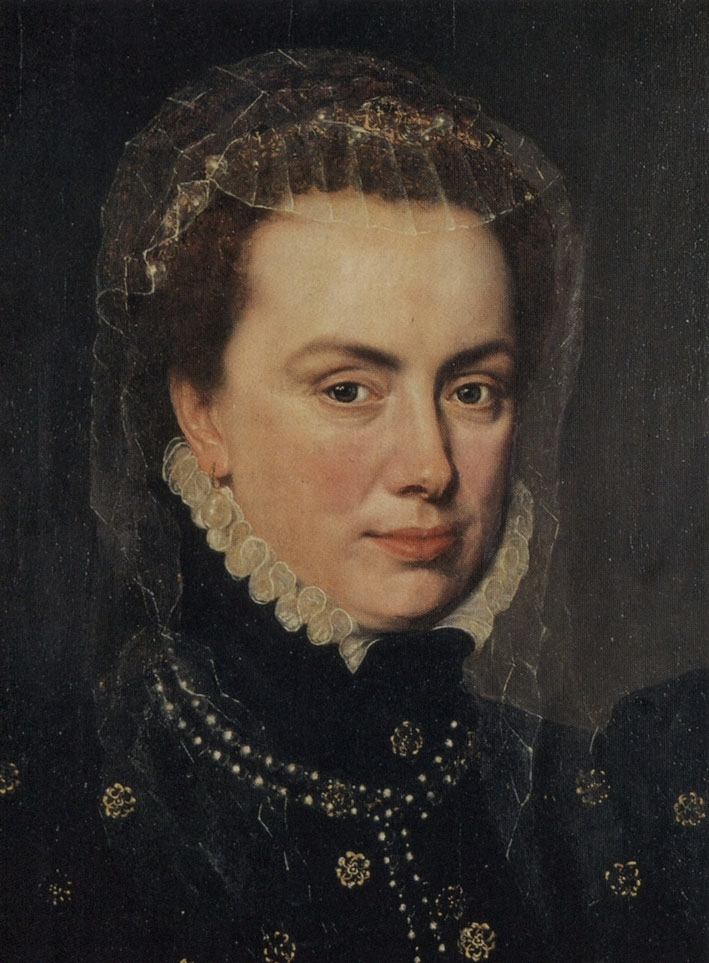
Margaret of Austria

"Happy plant, so cherished in heaven
Where nature placed all its most perfect things,
When it set out to create so much beauty,
I speak of my goddess, Marguerite of Austria."
-Laudomia Forteguerri

Forteguerri was known throughout Siena for her poetry, and her work continues to be noted by modern scholars, particularly for its strong Sapphic themes. Although only six of her sonnets have survived, all are testaments to the love she bore for other women, and five are specifically dedicated to Margaret of Austria. Margaret was a prominent Duchess and the illegitimate child of Holy Roman Emperor Charles V, and Forteguerri's love for her would become well known throughout Italy and as far as France. Although there is some dispute about the exact date of Margaret's first meeting with Forteguerri, it occurred either in 1533 (when Forteguerri would have been seventeen years old and Margaret just ten) or 1536 (when Forteguerri would have been twenty years old and Margaret thirteen). Regardless of the specific date, the two certainly met before Margaret's marriage to Alessandro de' Medici, Duke of Florence in 1536, and they quickly formed an intense bond. In spite of Margaret's extreme youth, many claimed that their attraction was instantaneous; indeed, Piccolomini declared, “As soon as Laudomia saw Madama and was seen by her… suddenly with the most ardent flames of Love each burned for the other, and the most manifest sign of this was that they went to visit each other many times.”

Such homoeroticism was actually not at all uncommon during Forteguerri's time. The Renaissance experienced a revival of ancient Greek and Roman literature, and the works of Sappho and Socrates (both of whose same-sex sexual preferences were well known during this period) were especially revered. Sappho was particularly championed as an exemplar of female poetic genius during the Renaissance, and same-sex female desire during this period was largely modeled after her. While some historians have argued that women's homoerotic relations were considered to be relatively harmless during this period because they led to no offspring (and thus did not threaten paternal heredity), the Renaissance view of what we would now term “lesbianism” was in actuality far more ambivalent, and it was typically divided into two categories. While chaste (if impassioned) female friendships were often considered to be a pure and almost holy form of love, same-sex tribadism was viewed as sinful, unnatural, and even monstrous. Forteguerri's feelings for Margaret were generally categorized as the former kind of love, and contemporary poet Firenzuola even lauds the divine purity and chastity of these two women in his 1541 Dialoghi delle bellezze delle donne. However many historians have pointed out that the valorization of homoerotic friendship during this period, combined with the common practice of same-sex bed sharing, would have provided many opportunities for homoerotic sexual exploration within such ostensibly “chaste” female relationships. Because of this, Forteguerri and Margaret are often cited as examples of an early lesbian relationship (although that term would not be invented until the nineteenth-century).

"Why do you keep me in this wretched state
With no hope ever to come out of my misery?

...Listen to my words, how they are ready
To beseech you. Nor do I want anything else
But that you keep me close to my goddess."
-Laudomia Forteguerri

However some modern scholars have questioned Forteguerri's seeming lesbianism, arguing that the sonnets she composed for Margaret may not have been genuine expressions of same-sex love and desire, but a calculated political strategy designed by Forteguerri to curry the favor of Margaret's royal father. Politically, this would make some sense; trouble was brewing between the Republic of Siena and its longtime rival, the Duchy of Florence, and signs of the Italian War of 1551-59 were beginning to appear. Many scholars have noted that Forteguerri, who was highly politically astute, would have recognized the strategic importance of an Imperial ally during this tumultuous period, and argue that such earnest and effusive expressions of platonic love were fairly typical of this era. However others have pointed out that the lack of eroticism in Forteguerri's poems is not surprising, given that they were able to be published at all. Indeed, they note that, while Forteguerri's poems lack in overt sexual imagery, they display a strong depth of emotion and tenderness for Margaret, and in one sonnet Forteguerri even requests that Margaret send her a small portrait of herself.

Although Margaret's feelings for Forteguerri are less clear, as none of the letters between the two women have survived, her lack of interest in—and even aversion to—her husbands makes it seem plausible that Margaret could have reciprocated Forteguerri's feelings. Margaret had no children from her marriage to Alessandro de' Medici and dressed in black for her subsequent marriage to Ottavio Farnese, the Duke of Parma (ostensibly in honor of her recently deceased husband), and she famously refused to consummate the union for five years. After she finally gave birth to twins in 1545, she chose to live separately from her husband, and when modern historian Renato Lefevre sought to defend Margaret's honor against rumors of sexual impropriety, he stated, perhaps somewhat tellingly, that “not one of the scandalous rumors so frequent at that time touched her. If anything, one could say the contrary about her… that men were of no interest to her as such.” Although there is no evidence that would suggest that Margaret and Forteguerri ever consummated their relationship, their transgressions of their gender roles and prominent positions within a male-dominated society, their lack of interest in their husbands, and their tender relationship has led many to assume that these women were lovers in all but name.

== Siege of Siena ==
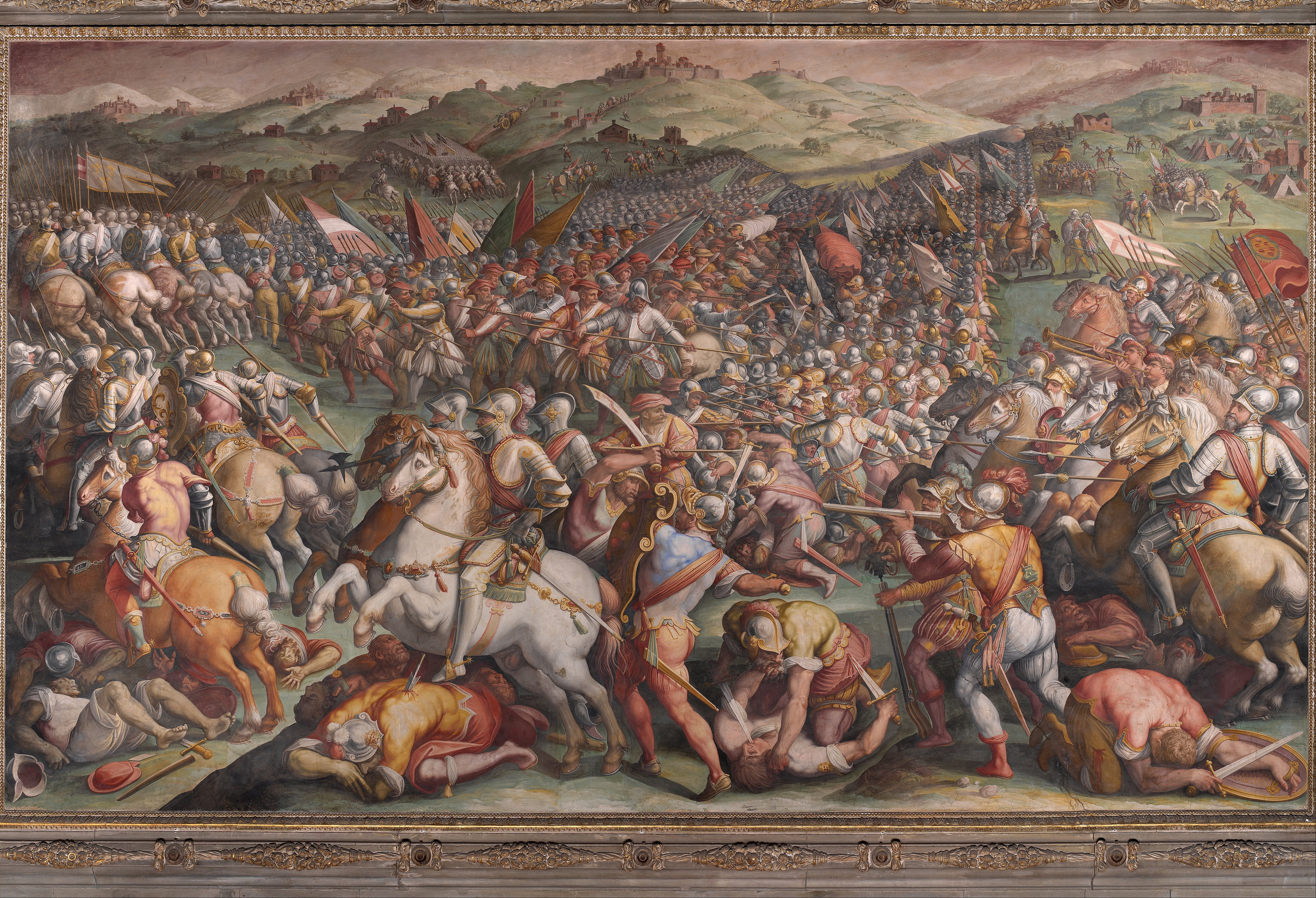
Giorgio Vasari – The Battle of Scanniglio

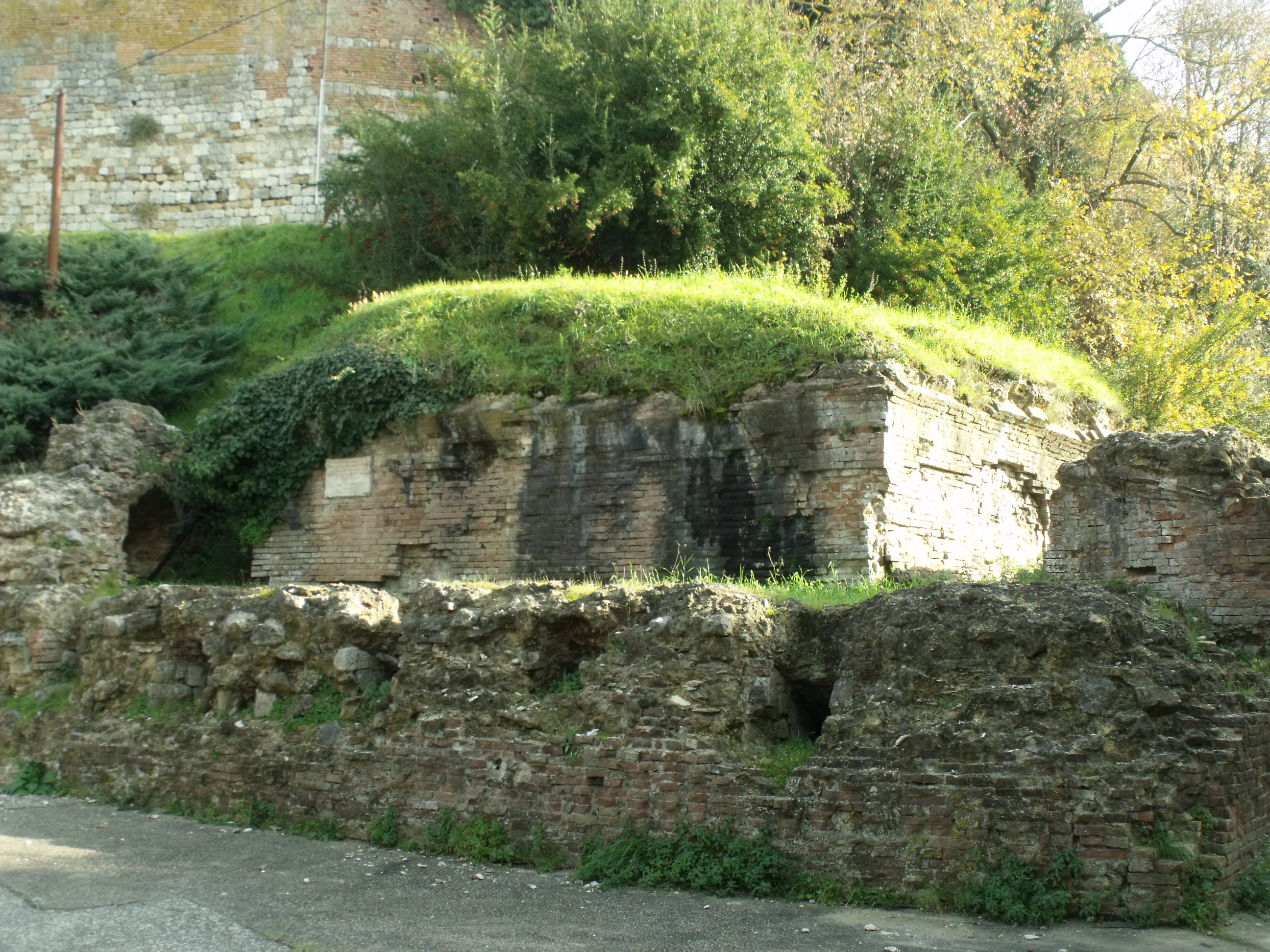
Siena's Fortino Delle Donne ("The Women's Fort") that Forteguerri helped construct

The Republic of Siena had been experiencing increasing political turmoil as the sixteenth-century went on, and by the 1550s, the city was involved in full scale-war. When the Petrucci era of the Republic came to an end in the 1520s, an intense struggle for power broke out between the city's leading factions as they all tried to take its place. The fighting escalated, and Pope Clement VII even attempted to intervene at the beginning of the sixteenth-century on behalf of the Notrevechi party (to which the Forteguerri family belonged); Holy Roman Emperor Charles V finally became involved in 1530, using the political turmoil of Siena as an excuse to occupy the city. The occupation was brutal, and in 1552 the people of Siena rose up against the Imperial forces and were able to expel their Spanish occupiers from the city. However, the Sienese people knew that they would have little chance of surviving the imminent Imperial attack. Because of this, every able citizen was mobilized in the effort to build fortifications, and Laudomia Forteguerri herself led a group of 1,000 noble and artisan women to aid in the construction. The siege was even more brutal than the occupation had been, and it lasted a year and a half (26 January 1554 to 17 April 1555). By the time the Republic of Siena finally surrendered to Duke Cosimo I de' Medici in April 1555 after the bloody Battle of Marciano, the once proud city lay in ruins, marking the end of the Republic of Siena Although there is no record of Laudomia after 1555, her legacy lived on long, and she would forever be remembered for her bravery in the face of her city's destruction.
