= Celsius (crater) =

Crater on the Moon

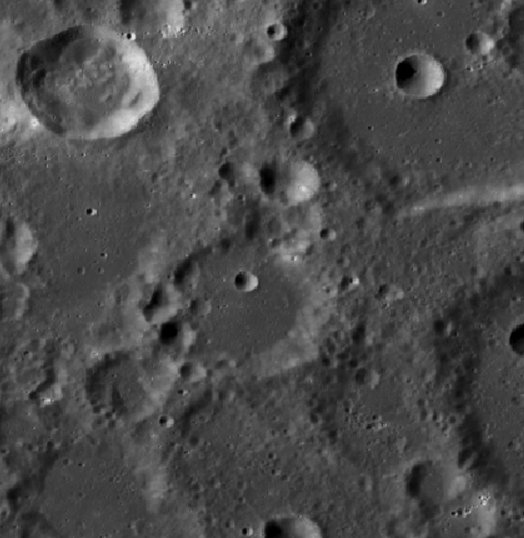
- LRO image of Celcius (center)
- Coordinates: 34.1°S 20.1°E
- Diameter: 38.96 km (24.21 mi)
- Depth: 1.5 km (0.93 mi)
- Colongitude: 341° at sunrise
- Eponym: Anders Celsius

Celsius is a small lunar impact crater that is located in the rugged terrain in the southern hemisphere on the Moon's near side. It lies less than one crater diameter to the south-southwest of the crater Zagut, and due north of Büsching. Separated by a valley to the east-southeast is the larger Rabbi Levi crater.

This is a heavily worn crater with a southwest rim that has been damaged by multiple small crater impacts. There is a valley-like gap in the northern rim that joins Celsius with Celsius A. The interior floor of Celsius is almost featureless, except for a small craterlet in the northern half.

This crater is named after Swedish astronomer, physicist and mathematician Anders Celsius. His name was introduced into lunar nomenclature by German astronomer and geophysicist J. F. Julius Schmidt in 1878. Its designation was officially adopted by the International Astronomical Union in 1935.

== Satellite craters ==
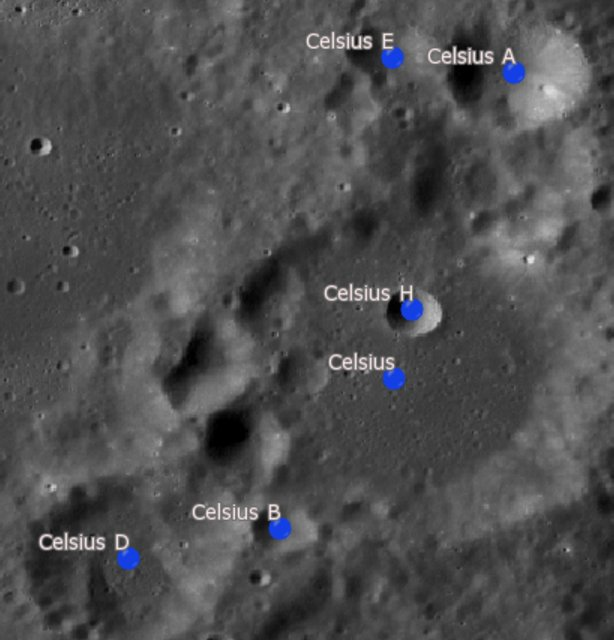
Satellite features of Celsius

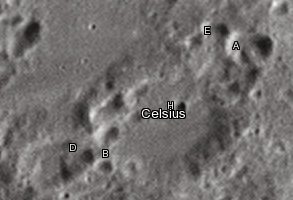
Celsius crater and its satellite craters taken from Earth in 2012 at the University of Hertfordshire's Bayfordbury Observatory with the telescopes Meade LX200 14" and Lumenera Skynyx 2-1

By convention these features are identified on lunar maps by placing the letter on the side of the crater midpoint that is closest to Celsius.

| Celsius | Latitude | Longitude | Diameter |
|---|---|---|---|
| A | 33.0° S | 20.5° E | 14 km |
| B | 34.6° S | 19.7° E | 6 km |
| D | 34.7° S | 19.1° E | 19 km |
| E | 32.9° S | 20.1° E | 11 km |
| H | 33.8° S | 20.1° E | 6 km |
