= Piccolomini (crater) =

Crater on the Moon

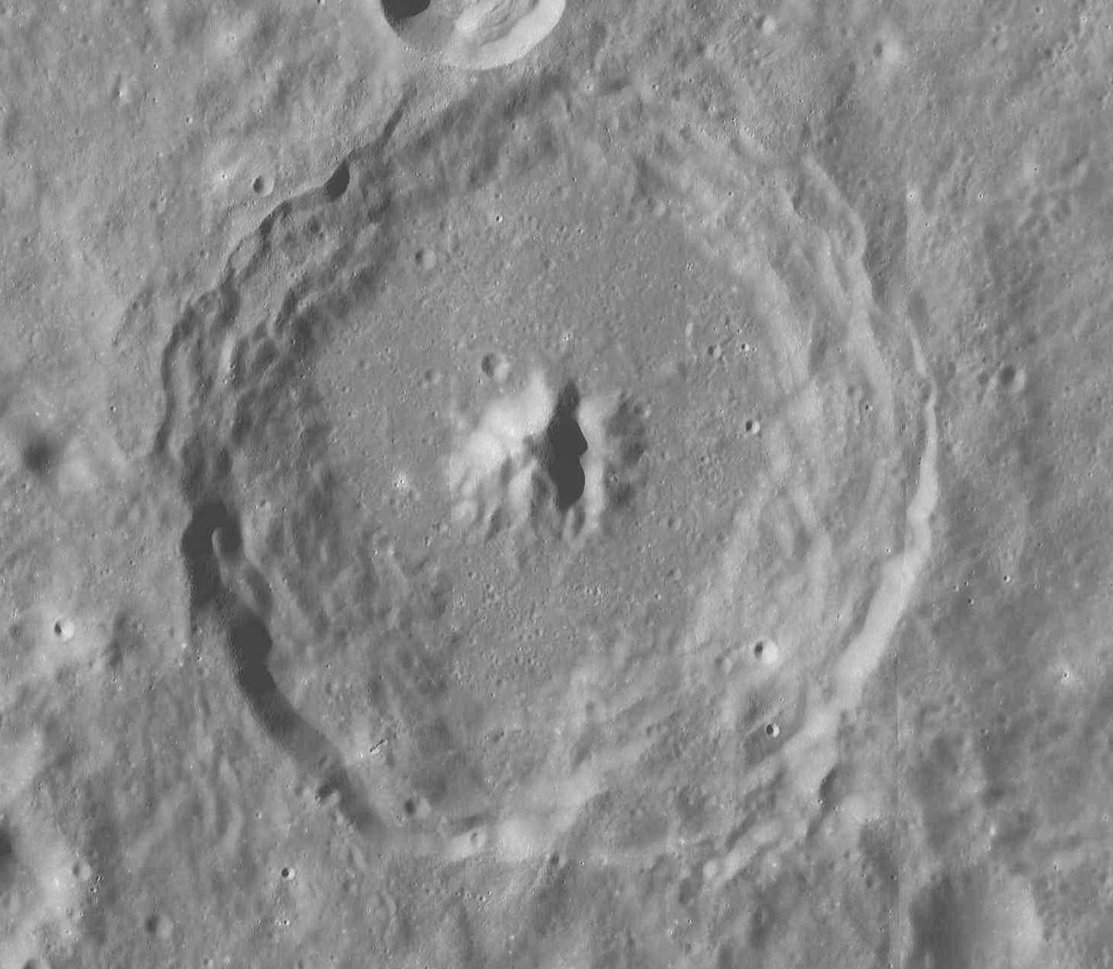
- LRO image
- Coordinates: 29.7°S 32.3°E
- Diameter: 87.58 km (54.42 mi)
- Depth: 4.5 km
- Colongitude: 328° at sunrise
- Formation: Upper Imbrian
- Eponym: Alessandro Piccolomini

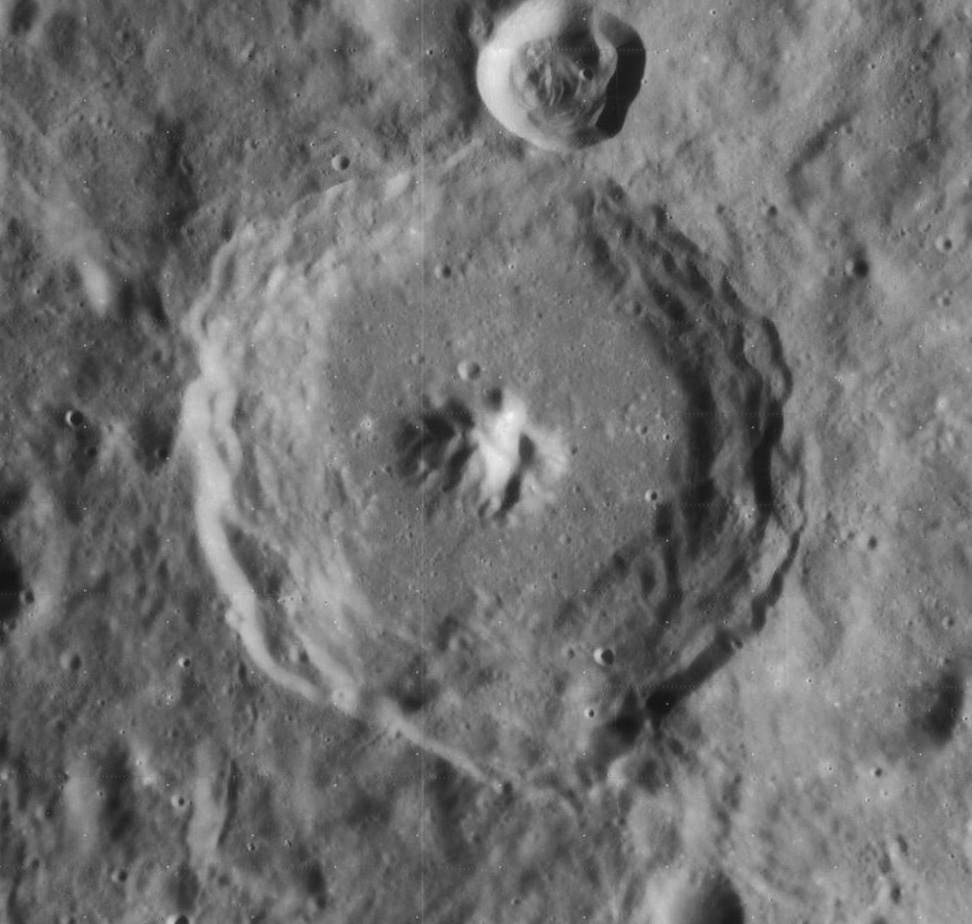
Lunar Orbiter 4 image, North on the photo is nearly on the right end of the smaller crater on top of the photo

Piccolomini is a prominent lunar impact crater located in the southeastern sector of the Moon. British astronomer T. W. Webb called this "a noble circle" with "a central hill and complex wall." The crater Rothmann lies to the west-southwest, and to the south is Stiborius. The lengthy Rupes Altai begins at the western rim of Piccolomini, curving to the northwest. It is 88 kilometers in diameter and 4,500 meters deep.

On the lunar geologic timescale, this crater is from the Upper Imbrian period, 3.8 to 3.2 billion years ago. The crater rim has not been severely worn by crater impacts, and the inner wall possesses wide terraces. These structures have been somewhat smoothed by landslips and erosion, most likely induced by seismic activity. An influx of material has entered across the northern rim, flowing down toward the base.

The crater floor is relatively smooth, with only minor hills and impact craters. In the middle is a complex central peak surrounded by lesser mounts. The main peak rises to a height of 2.0 kilometers above the surrounding floor. The infrared spectrum of pure crystalline plagioclase has been identified on this rise.

The crater is named after 16th century Italian Archbishop and astronomer Alessandro Piccolomini (1508-1578). This designation was formally adopted by the International Astronomical Union in 1935.

== Satellite craters ==
By convention these features are identified on lunar maps by placing the letter on the side of the crater midpoint that is closest to Piccolomini.

Piccolomini	Latitude	Longitude	Diameter
A	26.4° S	30.4° E	16 km
B	25.8° S	30.5° E	12 km
C	27.6° S	31.1° E	26 km
D	26.9° S	32.2° E	17 km
E	26.1° S	31.8° E	18 km
F	26.3° S	31.8° E	72 km
G	27.2° S	34.7° E	18 km
H	27.9° S	27.6° E	9 km
J	25.0° S	30.1° E	28 km
K	25.7° S	29.7° E	8 km
L	26.1° S	33.7° E	12 km
M	27.8° S	31.8° E	23 km
N	27.3° S	26.2° E	9 km
O	26.6° S	30.5° E	11 km
P	30.4° S	35.9° E	12 km
Q	30.8° S	36.4° E	14 km
R	29.3° S	35.3° E	16 km
S	31.6° S	34.1° E	21 km
T	28.5° S	29.0° E	8 km
W	26.8° S	29.2° E	6 km
X	26.9° S	31.5° E	8 km

== See also ==
- Asteroid 274264 Piccolomini
