= Andreas Stöberl =

Austrian astronomer, mathematician, and theologian

Andreas Stöberl (c. 1464 in Pleiskirchen near Altötting (Note: Bauch (1901) sources Stöberl's birthplace "Pleiskirchen near Altötting" to the archive of the Ludwig-Maximilians-Universität München, O I, Fasc. 2, year 1484. Grössing concurs. Older literature frequently gives "Oettingen", or occasionally "Vilshofen", which has been shown to be dubious by Aschbach in 1877. Aschbach points to the matriculation register of the University of Vienna, but slightly mis-quotes it as saying "ex Oettingen", when it actually has Stöberl's matriculation in the winter semester of 1497 as "Mag. Andreas Sto[e]berl, Ingelstauiensis ex Otting 2 sol. d." (MUW 1497 II R 4). "Oettingen" and "Oetting" (an older name for Altötting) are frequently confused in the older literature; Günther in the Allgemeine Deutsche Biographie (1893) is the only one to mention "Oettingen im Ries" explicitly (he also mentions Vilshofen).) – September 3, 1515, in Vienna (Note: Aschbach gives his death date as September 3, 1515, citing the Rheinische Nationen-Matrikel (the matriculation register of the "Rheinische Nation" at the University of Vienna, which Stiborius, having come from Ingolstadt, was a member of): "Mag. Andreas Stiborius Canon. Vienn. et plebanus in Stockerau, famigeratus Mathematicus, profundus theologus, vir multigenae eruditionis, obiit Viennae 3. die Sept. anno 1515 et sepultus in Stockerau" (fol. 219v). Günther in the Allgemeine Deutsche Biographie gives September 5, without source. According to Göhler Stiborius's successor as canon at St. Stephen's was installed on that date (i.e., on September 5).)), better known by his Latinised name Andreas Stiborius (Boius), (Note: Not to be confused with Andreas Stiborius, canon at Olomouc, also a mathematician and astronomer and uncle of Augustinus Olomucensis. Olomucensis' uncle is sometimes also given as "Andreas Ctiborius".) was a German humanist astronomer, mathematician, and theologian working mainly at the University of Vienna.

== Life ==
Stöberl studied from 1479 on at the University of Ingolstadt, where he became a magister in 1484, and subsequently a member of the Faculty of Arts. At the University of Ingolstadt, he met and became a friend of Conrad Celtis, an eminent advocate of humanism who lectured there between 1492 and 1497. When Celtis moved to Vienna in 1497, Stöberl followed his mentor. (Note: Schöner mentions in Boehm et al. that from 1489 to at least 1496 Stiborius headed the Lilienburse, a foundation supporting scholars from Württemberg and Swabia studying in Vienna. The foundation had been established in 1456 by Burkhard Krebs (d. 1462), since 1438 dean at St. Stephan's Cathedral, Passau, who originally was from Herrenberg in Württemberg. Uiblein points to a document from 1507, in which the five superintendents of the foundation, Mag. Stephan Rosl (Rosinus) of Augsburg, Dr. Georg Läntsch of Ellingen, Dr. Johann Cuspinian of Schweinfurt, Dr. Wilhelm Puelinger of Passau and Mag. Andreas Stöberl of Ötting, acknowledge receipt of some payment to the foundation.) Stiborius was a member of the Sodalitas Litterarum Danubiana, a circle of humanists founded by Celtis. In 1502 he became one of two professors for mathematics (the other was Johannes Stabius, his friend from Ingolstadt) at the Collegium poetarum et mathematicorum, founded on Celtis' initiative by emperor Maximilian I the year before, as a part of the University of Vienna. At the Collegium, Stiborius taught courses in astronomy and astrology, as he did later at the university, where he got a chair at the Collegium ducale in 1503. Stiborius was a gifted teacher and well-liked by his students. In 1507 or 1508 he became a canon at St. Stephen's, (Note: Günther in the Allgemeine Deutsche Biographie gives 1507 as the date, probably based on Aschbach, who, while mentioning that year, does not state that Stiborius became canon that year. Göhler writes that he became canon at St. Stephen's in 1508 "before October 21". Grössing gives 1503, and so does Schöner.) and until his death in 1515 in Vienna he was also parish priest in Stockerau, where he was buried.

== Works ==
In Vienna, Stiborius worked with Georg Tannstetter, who came to Vienna from Ingolstadt in Autumn 1502. Together they became the most prominent exponents of the "Second Viennese School of Mathematics" (the first having been the circle around Johann von Gmunden, Georg von Peuerbach, and Regiomontanus). Tannstetter, in his Viri Mathematici, names both Stabius and Stiborius as his teachers.

As editor, Stiborius published an edition of Robert Grosseteste's Libellus Linconiensis de Phisicis lineis, angulis et figuris, per quas omnes acciones naturales complentur in 1503.

Stiborius wrote two prefaces for Tannstetter's edition Tabulae Eclypsium..., which was published in 1514 and contained tables of eclipses of Georg von Peuerbach and the primi mobilis tables of Regiomontanus.

In preparation of the 10th session of the 5th council of the Lateran, Pope Leo X requested in October 1514 from various rulers to have their scientists offer proposals on the calendar reform. Emperor Maximilian gave the task to Stiborius and Tannstetter in Vienna, and to Johannes Stöffler at Tübingen. Stiborius and Tannstetter proposed to omit one leap year every 134 years, and to drop the 19-year metonic cycle used by the Church to calculate the Easter date. Instead of the metonic cycle, they proposed to simply use the true astronomic calculation for the full moon dates to determine Paschal Full Moon. Furthermore, they pointed out that the true astronomic March equinox and full moons, on which the whole calculation of the Easter date and thus other Church holidays was based, would occur at different times, sometimes even different dates in places at different longitudes around the globe, leading to Church holidays falling on different days in different places. They recommended to use universally the equinox at the Meridian of Jerusalem or Rome. Tannstetter and Stiborius's calendar reform proposal was published as Super requisitione sanctissimi Leonis Papae X. et divi Maximiliani Imp. p.f. Aug. De Romani Calendarii correctione Consilium in Florentissimo studio Viennensi Anustriae conscriptum et aeditum, around 1515, by the printer Johannes Singriener in Vienna. As it turned out, the whole topic of the calendar reform was not even discussed at the fifth Lateran Council.

Tannstetter gives in his Viri Mathematici a list of books in Stiborius's library, and also a list of works written by the latter himself. He mentions a five-volume Opus Umbrarum ("Work of Shadows"), in which Stiborius treated various astronomical and mathematical topics such as cartographic projections, the theory and use of the astrolabe, including the saphea, the construction of sundials, and others. The work was the basis of his lectures in Vienna, but it appears to have never been published. A partial copy made in 1500 of these lecture notes has survived.

== Legacy ==
The lunar crater Stiborius is named after him.

== Literature ==
- Schöner, Christoph: Mathematik und Astronomie an der Universität Ingolstadt im 15. und 16. Jahrhundert, Ludovico Maximilianea. Forschungen; Vol. 13, Berlin : Duncker und Humblot, 1994. ISBN 3-428-08118-8. In German.
