= Wöhler (crater) =

Lunar impact crater in southeastern highlands of the Moon

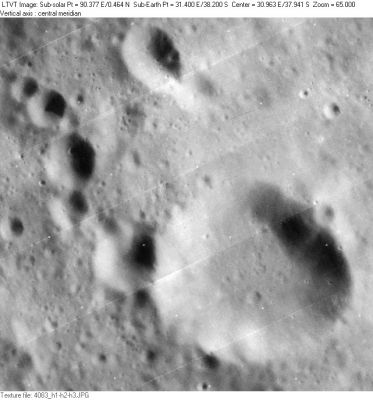
- Lunar Orbiter 4 image
- Coordinates: 38.2°S 31.4°E
- Diameter: 27 km
- Depth: 2.1 km
- Colongitude: 329° at sunrise
- Eponym: Friedrich Wöhler

Wöhler is a small lunar impact crater that lies to the south of the crater Stiborius, in the rugged southeastern highlands of the Moon. It was named after German chemist Friedrich Wöhler. To the west-northwest is the battered remnant of Riccius. This is a generally circular crater formation with a slightly eroded outer rim. There is a small crater attached to the western rim. The inner walls slope down to a featureless inner floor.

== Satellite craters ==
By convention these features are identified on lunar maps by placing the letter on the side of the crater midpoint that is closest to Wöhler.

Wöhler	Latitude	Longitude	Diameter
A	37.7° S	30.3° E	8 km
B	37.2° S	30.8° E	11 km
C	36.7° S	30.6° E	12 km
D	36.2° S	31.2° E	7 km
E	38.9° S	30.2° E	7 km
F	40.1° S	33.8° E	8 km
G	40.1° S	35.6° E	7 km
