= Hugh Percy Wilkins =

British mechanical engineer, soldier, civil servant and astronomer

Hugh Percy Wilkins (4 December 1896 –23 January 1960) was a Welsh-born engineer and amateur astronomer.

He was born Hugh Percival Wilkins in Carmarthen, where he received his early education, then lived near Llanelli prior to moving to England.

By profession, he was a mechanical engineer and civil servant, but his reputation rests on his achievements as an amateur astronomer, particularly as a selenographer. He was initially elected to the British Astronomical Association (BAA) on 27 February 1918 at the invitation of W F Denning and Fiammetta Wilson. At some point his membership lapsed and he rejoined on 25 March 1936 this time at the invitation of Robert Barker and Walter Goodacre. Wilkins was elected to the fellowship of the Royal Astronomical Society on 11 May 1945. He was Director of the BAA's Lunar Section from 1946 to 1956.

He produced a 100" map of the Moon, which included new names for a number of features. In 1948 he put forward a request to the IAU that twenty-two new names be adopted. His proposals were turned down on the premise that the features were small or near the limb and already had letter designations.

In 1951 he published a 300"-diameter map of the Moon, considered by some as the culmination of the art of selenography prior to the space age. His maps were dense with detail, some of which was fictitious, making them less useful. He made additional requests to the IAU in 1952 and 1955, which were turned down. However the Goodacre and Mee crater names from a 1926 map he had produced did become part of the lunar nomenclature.

He also published a number of books intended to popularize astronomy, including two works in collaboration with Sir Patrick Moore. The most notable was his work, The Moon, which included his map.

For many years Wilkins took the astronomy evening class at Crayford Manor House where they continue to use a copy of his 300-inch map regularly in the observatory.

Wilkins died on 23 January 1960, having only retired on 31 December 1959.

The crater Wilkins on the Moon is named after him.

== Bibliography ==
- H.P. Wilkins, "300-inch Moon map", 1951.
- H.P. Wilkins, "The True Book About the Stars", 1953, London, Muller.
- H.P. Wilkins, "Our Moon", 1954, London, Muller.
- H.P. Wilkins and P. Moore, "The Moon; A Complete Description of the Surface of the Moon", 1955, London, Faber and Faber.
- H.P. Wilkins, "Mysteries of Space and Time", 1955, London, Muller.
- H.P. Wilkins, "Clouds, Rings and Crocodiles: By Spaceship Round the Planets," 1955.
- H.P. Wilkins and P. Moore, "Making and using a telescope; the home assembly and applications of astronomical equipment", 1956, London, Eyre & Spottiswoode.
- H.P. Wilkins, "Guide to the Heavens", 1956, London, F. Muller.
- H.P. Wilkins, "Instructions to Young Astronomers", 1957, London, Museum Press.
- H.P. Wilkins, "The True Book About the Moon", 1960, London, F. Muller.

He also wrote several articles for Popular Astronomy.
