= Nikolaus Gerbel =

German humanist, jurist and doctor of both laws

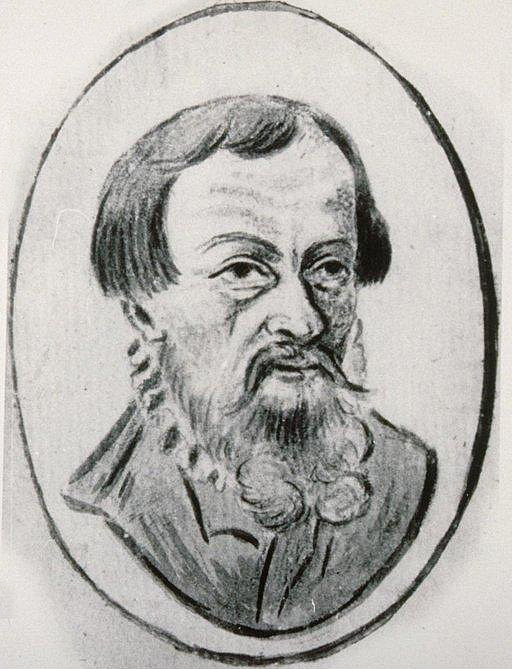
Nikolaus Gerbel

Nikolaus Gerbel (or Gerbellius) (c. 1485 – 1560) was a German humanist, jurist and doctor of both laws.

Nikolaus Gerbel was part of a circle of literary men living in Strasbourg. He is notable for his friendship with Martin Luther, his correspondence with Erasmus and Melanchthon and his support to Johann Reuchlin in the Pfefferkorn-Reuchlin Controversy.

He was born in Pforzheim in the Black Forest and studied at the University of Vienna (1502–1505), at the University of Cologne (1505–1506), at the University of Tübingen (1508–1512) and later at the University of Bologna.

He published several works in ancient Greek geography (Descriptio Graeciae) and Roman history.

He also published the complete edition of Johannes Cuspinian's, to which he added a not always reliable Life of Cuspinian (Commentationes Cusp., Strasburg, 1540).

Gerbel's Nouum Testamentum graece was the first printed Greek text without parallel Latin translation. Gerbel used Erasmus's first bilingual edition (1516) as his source text.
