= Christoph Rothmann =

16th-century German mathematician

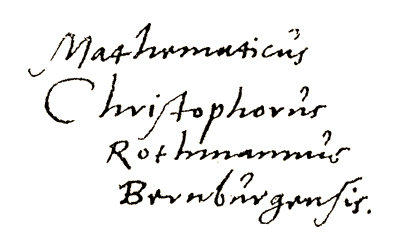
Signature of Mathematicus Christophorus Rothmannus Bernburgensis

Christoph Rothmann (between 1550 and 1560 in Bernburg, Saxony-Anhalt – probably after 1600 in Bernburg) was a German mathematician and one of the few well-known astronomers of his time. His research contributed substantially to the fact that Kassel became a European center of the astronomy in the 16th century.

== Life ==
It is not known today when Rothmann was born, although it is known that his place of birth was Bernberg on the Saale, probably between 1550 and 1560. After a basic education he studied theology and mathematics in Wittenberg with support of the prince, Joachim Ernst von Anhalt. Rothmann's enthusiasm for the astronomy was substantial. Christoph Rothmann was appointed in 1577 as court mathematician in Kassel by Prince Wilhelm IV of Hessen. From 1584 to 1590 he was active in astronomy at the observatory of the prince. His research contributed substantially to the fact that Kassel became a center of the astronomical research. In 1590 he visited Tycho Brahe in Uraniborg on the island Ven, but did not return to Kassel. After the trip to Uranienburg he lived until his death in Bernberg and wrote additional (unknown) theological writings.

== Work ==
Christoph Rothmann computed and implemented the Kassel star catalog between 1585 and 1587 almost exclusively under the technical sponsorship of Prince Wilhelm IV. Rothmann was a convinced follower of Nikolaus Copernicus, who justified the heliocentric view of the world. In contrast to his prominent astronomical colleagues he fell into oblivion in the 17th century.

In the 16th century in Europe two groups of researchers with the list of new more exact star catalogs had out-done. On side the well-known Dane Tycho Brahe, who had established the famous observatory Uraniborg on the island Ven, and a group of astronomers in Kassel at the court of the prince. Here Rothmann and Joost Bürgi, a Swiss mathematician, worked. The two working groups maintained a scientific exchange like an extensive exchange of letters between Kassel and Ven.

An often quoted letter between Rothmann and Brahe pointed out the whole dilemma of the physics at that time. Brahe distrusted the heliocentric view of the world of Nikolaus Copernicus, and raised in a letter to Rothmann the following objection against the movement of the Earth: "if the Earth actually turns from west to east, then a cannon ball, which is shot toward the turning of the Earth, must continue to fly as fast as a projectile fired in opposite direction." Rothmann answered that both projectile and cannon would participate in the movement of the Earth and so that his objection was invalid. This contradicted however the Aristotelian view of motion then valid in Europe. At that time this was so fundamental a contradiction that it could only be eliminated in the middle the 17th century with the discovery of the force of gravity.

The crater Rothmann on the Moon is named after him.

== Writings ==
- Observatorium stellarum liber primus, Kassel 1589 (manual of the astronomy and Christoph Rothmann's most well-known book) ref
- Astronomia: In qua hypotheses Ptolemaicae ex hypothesibus Copernici corriguntur et supplentur: et imprimis intellectus et usus tabularum Prutenicarum declaratur et demonstratur, Manuscripte von 1580, (in der Universitätsbibliothek Kassel)
- Restitutio Sacramentorum, Goslar 1611, (posthum herausgegebene theologische Schrift)
- Scriptum de cometa, qui anni Christi 1585 mensib. Octobri et Novembri apparuit. Herausgegeben von Willebrord Snellius in: Descriptio cometae, qui anno 1618 mense Novembri primum effulsit (Seite 69-156), Verlag Elzevir, Leiden 1619
