= Augustinus Olomucensis =

Czech writer and Roman Catholic priest (1467–1513)

Augustinus Olomucensis (March 1467, Olomouc – 3 November 1513, Olomouc) was a Moravian humanist and theologian. His birth name was Augustin Käsenbrot (or Käsenbrod), but he was also known as Augustinus Moravus or Augustinus Bemus, or, in Czech, as Augustin Moravský or Augustin Olomoucký (or Olomúcký). Augustinus is generally considered the foremost Moravian humanist of his time.

== Life ==
After the early death of his father, Augustinus grew up in the household of his uncle Andreas Ctiborius, who was canon at Olomouc. Sponsored by Ctiborius and Johann Roth (1426–1506), Bishop of Wrocław, Augustinus studied at the Jagiellonian University at Kraków from 1484 to 1488, where he was graduated as a magister of philosophy and then at Padua. On 16 April 1494 he obtained the degree of a doctor in canon law in Ferrara.

In 1496 he became secretary at the chancellery of Vladislaus II in Buda. Throughout the years he would advance from secretary apparently to the post of vice-chancellor. Augustinus was a stout opponent of the Moravian Church (Waldensians), and in his position at the chancellery he influenced the king to massive repressions against these, in the spirit of Heinrich Institoris.

In 1497 Agustinus became canon at Brno, and the following year he was chosen as provost at Olomouc, but because another candidate for that office recurred to Rome, Augustinus could take office only in 1506.

Augustinus maintained intensive contacts with other humanists of his time, and was also a member of Conrad Celtis' Sodalitas Litterarum Danubiana in Vienna. A passionate collector of coins, Augustinus presented the Sodalitas Litterarum Danubiana in 1508 a golden cup decorated with ancient coins.

The cup is today at the Dresden State Art Collections. Augustin offered generous support to fellow humanists, such as to Valentin Eck, whom he housed for some time, or to Johannes Cuspinian, whom he let peruse his large library, or to Celtis and Joachim Vadian, whom he sent copies of manuscripts they otherwise had no access to.

Before 1511, Augustinus became canon in Prague and in Wrocław. In 1511 he resigned from his office at the chancellery at Buda and moved permanently to Olomouc, where he died two years later.

== Works ==
- Dialogus in defensionem poetices, printed in Venice, 1493.
- De modo epistolandi, printed by Simon Bevilaqua in Venice, 1495.
- (Editor): Tabularum Joannis blanchini canones, astronomical tables of Giovanni Bianchini of 1440. Printed by Simon Bevilaqua in Venice 1495.
- De secta Waldensium, printed by Konrad Baumgarten at Olomouc, 1500.
- Catalogus Episcoporum Olomucensium, dedicated to the Bishop of Olomouc, Stanislaus Thurzó, printed by Hieronymus Vietor and Johannes Singriener in Vienna, 1511. Republished and expanded in 1831 by Richter.
