= Riccius (crater) =

Crater on the Moon

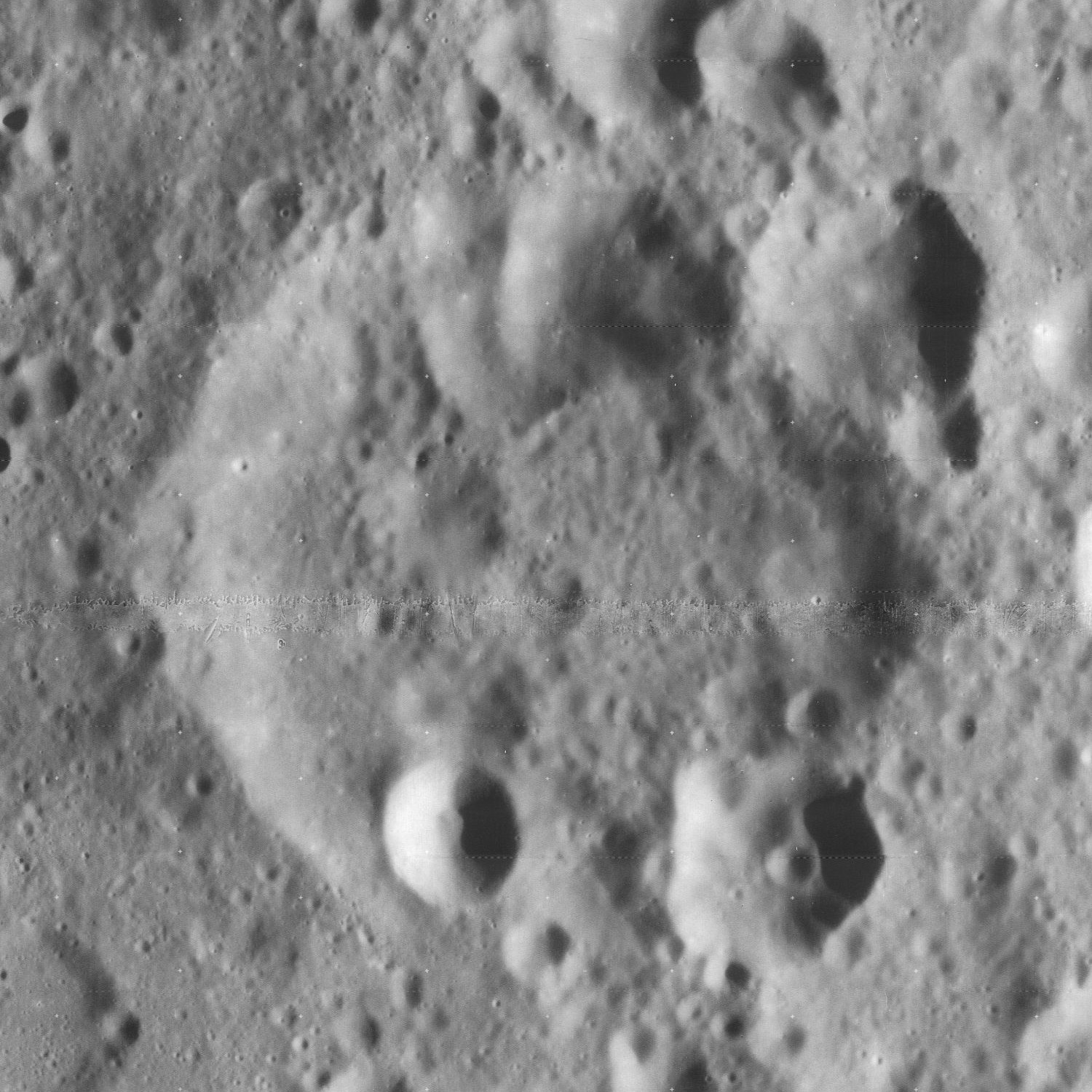
- Lunar Orbiter 4 image
- Coordinates: 37.02°S 26.43°E
- Diameter: 71.79 km
- Depth: 1.8 km
- Colongitude: 335° at sunrise
- Formation: Pre-Nectarian
- Eponym: Augustinus Riccius and Matteo Ricci

Riccius is a lunar impact crater that is located in the rugged, southeastern part of the Moon's near side. It was named after Italian astronomers Augustinus Riccius and Matteo Ricci. It lies within one crater diameter southeast of the crater Rabbi Levi. To the east-northeast is Stiborius and due south is Nicolai.

On the lunar geologic timescale, this crater dates to the Pre-Nectarian epoch. This formation has been so heavily bombarded by subsequent impacts that it is nearly unrecognizable as a crater. Only the western and southwestern parts of the rim remains intact, the remainder having been obliterated by small craters. These craters also occupy parts of the northern and southern floor. Only a section in the northeast and near the intact western rim remain unmarked. This is perhaps the most defaced crater formation on the Moon that possesses an eponym.

== Satellite craters ==
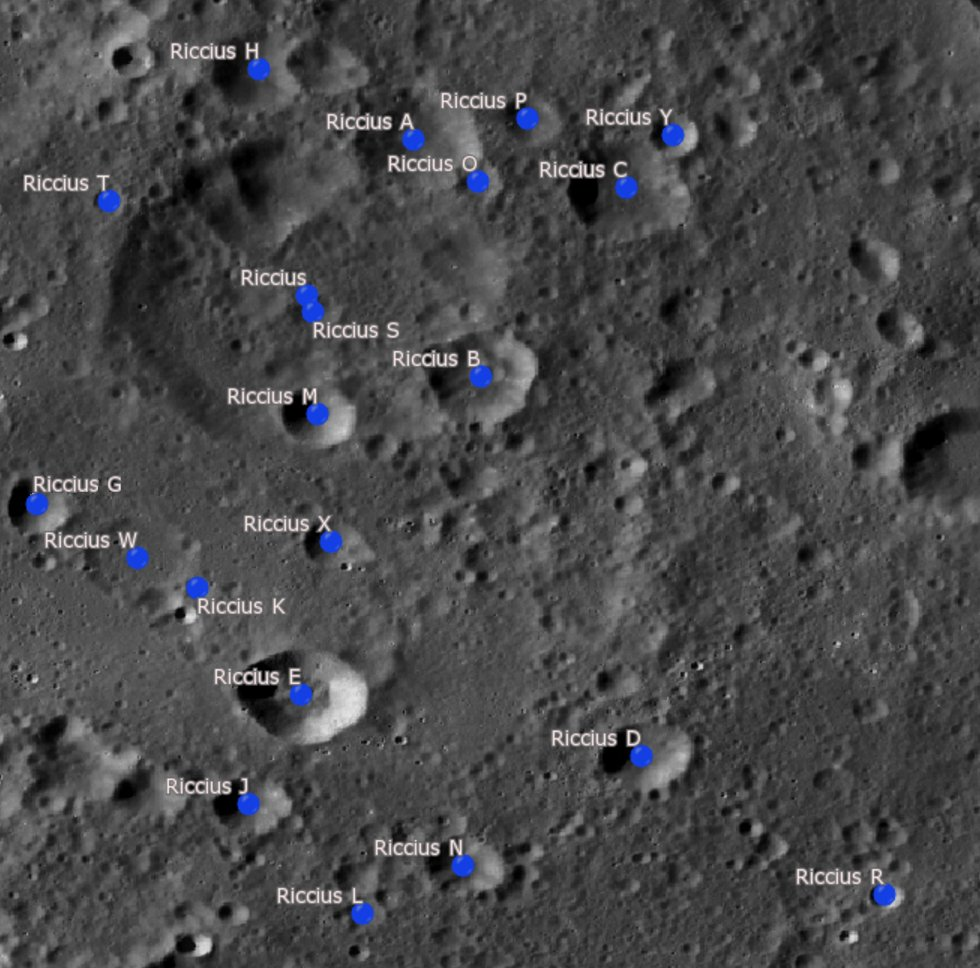
Ricci and its satellite craters

By convention these features are identified on lunar maps by placing the letter on the side of the crater midpoint that is closest to Riccius.

Riccius	Latitude	Longitude	Diameter
A	35.9° S	27.4° E	24 km
B	37.5° S	27.8° E	19 km
C	36.2° S	28.8° E	24 km
D	40.3° S	28.9° E	17 km
E	39.9° S	26.4° E	22 km
G	38.5° S	24.4° E	13 km
H	35.4° S	26.1° E	20 km
J	40.7° S	26.0° E	13 km
K	39.1° S	25.7° E	6 km
L	41.5° S	26.8° E	8 km
M	37.8° S	26.4° E	14 km
N	41.1° S	27.6° E	13 km
O	36.2° S	27.8° E	9 km
P	35.7° S	28.1° E	11 km
R	41.4° S	30.7° E	7 km
S	37.0° S	26.5° E	11 km
T	36.3° S	25.0° E	7 km
W	38.9° S	25.2° E	19 km
X	38.8° S	26.7° E	11 km
Y	35.8° S	29.1° E	10 km
