= Johannes Cuspinian =

German-Austrian humanist, scientist, diplomat, and historian

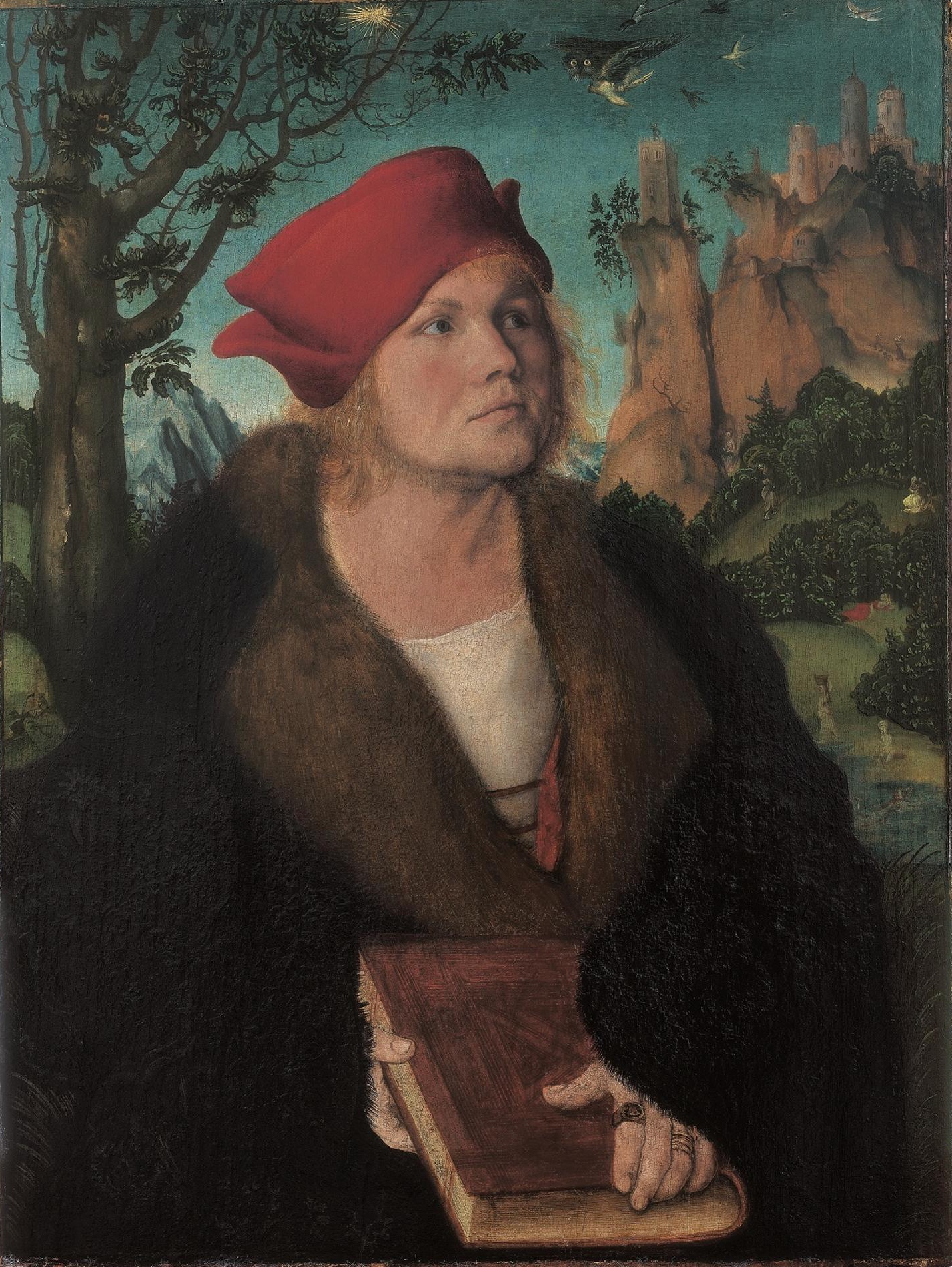
Johannes Cuspinian by Lucas Cranach the Elder (1502)

Johannes Cuspinianus (December 1473 – 19 April 1529), born Johan Spießhaymer (or Speißheimer), was a German-Austrian humanist, scientist, diplomat, and historian. Born in Spießheim near Schweinfurt in Franconia, of which Cuspinianus is a Latinization, he studied in Leipzig and Würzburg. He went to Vienna in 1492 and became a professor of medicine at the University of Vienna. He became Rector of the university in 1500 and also served as Royal Superintendent until his death.

A leading scholar, he was the author of De Caesaribus et Imperatoribus and was also given a poet's laurel wreath by Maximilian I, Holy Roman Emperor. He was part of an intellectual circle that included Joachim Vadianus and Stiborius. He rendered important service as the discoverer and editor of classical and medieval historical texts. His unfinished Austria (1527-8) was an important historical-geographical regional survey of Lower Austria.

== Early life ==
In 1490 he matriculated at the University of Leipzig, went to the University of Vienna (1493) to continue his humanistic studies, and in 1494 entered there on a course of medicine. At this early age he edited the "Liber Hymnorum" of Prudentius, and made a reputation by his lectures on Virgil, Horace, Sallust, and Cicero.

He was acquainted with Emperor Frederick III. In 1493, in reward for a panegyric on the life of St. Leopold of Austria, he was crowned as poet laureate and received the title of Master of Arts from Maximilian. Soon after this he was made a doctor of medicine, and in 1500 rector of the university.

== Career ==
Maximilian made him his confidential councillor and appointed him curator of the university for life. Cuspinian also received the position of chief librarian of the Imperial Library, and superintendent of the archives of the imperial family. As curator of the university, he exercised great influence on its development, although he was not able to prevent the decline caused by the political and religious disturbances of the second decade of the sixteenth century. He was on terms of friendship with the most noted humanists and scholars; the calling of his friend Conrad Celtes to Vienna is especially due to him. Celtes and he were the heading spirits of the literary association called the "Sodalitas Litterarum Danubiana".

In 1515, Cuspinian was prefect of the city of Vienna. Emperor Maximilian, also Charles V at a later date, sent him on numerous diplomatic missions to Hungary, Bohemia, and Poland. He brought about a settlement of the disputed succession between the Habsburg line and the King of Hungary and Bohemia; another of his missions was to accompany Bona Sforza, the bride of King Sigismund of Poland, to Kraków.

As a diplomat, he served as an envoy to Poland and Hungary and orchestrated the Habsburg and Jagellonian marriage alliance of 1515. In 1515, Sigismund I of Poland entered an alliance with the Holy Roman Emperor Maximilian I. In return for Maximilian lending weight to the provisions of the 2nd Peace of Thorn, Sigismund consented to the marriage of the children of Vladislaus II, his brother, to the grandchildren of Maximilian. Through this double marriage contract, Bohemia and Hungary passed to the House of Habsburg in 1526, on the death of Sigismund's nephew, Louis II – a result of enormous importance for later central and eastern European history for centuries to come.

== Writings ==
His literary activity covered the most varied domains. Although his poetical writings are of little importance, and his manuscript "Collectanea medicinalia" of no great value, nevertheless he attained a high reputation as a collector and, to some degree, as an editor of ancient and medieval manuscripts.

Among other publications, he edited in 1511 L. Florus, in 1515 the "Libellus de lapidibus" of Marbod, and the medieval chronicler Otto of Freising. Important as a contribution to the study of ancient history is the publication which first appeared, after his death in 1553, namely, the "Fasti consulares", with which were united the "Chronicle" of Cassiodorus and the "Breviarium" of Faenius Rufus. Another valuable work of Cuspinian is the "History of the Roman Emperors", prepared during the years 1512-22 (in Latin, 1540, and in German, 1541).

For a long time, especially after the Battle of Mohács, he busied himself with the Turkish question and printed both political and historical writings on the subject, the most important of which is his "De Turcarum origine, religione et tyrannide". It was at that time that some of Cuspinian's earlier writings were irrevocably lost because the only copies of them had been kept in the famed Bibliotheca Corviniana at Buda, destroyed during the Ottoman conquest.

Cuspinian's best work is "Austria, sive Commentarius de rebus Austriæ", edited by Kaspar Brusch in 1553 with critical notes. A kind of diary (1502–27), which throws much light on his political activity, was published in "Fontes rerum austriacarum" (1885), I, 1ff. A life of Cuspinian, not always reliable, is found in the complete edition of his works by Gerbelius (Commentationes Cusp., Strasburg, 1540); a more complete edition of his works appeared at Frankfurt am Main in 1601.

In 1528 he published the manuscript map of Hungary he had found after 1526, presumably in Buda. The map was edited by Georg Tannstetter from the manuscript of Lazarus Secretarius and was published by Petrus Apianus the printer of Ingolstadt.

== Grave ==
Cuspinianus is buried in Vienna's Stephansdom.

== Sources ==
- Herbermann, Charles, ed. (1913). "Johannes Cuspinian" . Catholic Encyclopedia. New York: Robert Appleton Company.
- Tabula Hungarie ad quatuor latera, The Lazarus map of Hungary. Ingolstadt 1528.
- (in English) Renaissance-Humanism
- (in German) Aeiou entry on Cuspinianus

Attribution
