= Gerson ben Solomon Catalan =

Gerson ben Solomon Catalan, also known as Gerson ben Solomon of Arles, was a French Jewish author of the thirteenth century. He compiled an encyclopedia entitled Sha'ar ha-Shamayim (Door of Heaven) in Hebrew, which was widely read later in the Middle Ages and the early modern period. He lived in southern France (Languedoc or Provence), possibly at Arles. He died, possibly at Perpignan, toward the end of the thirteenth century.

== Sha'ar ha-Shamayim ==
Catalan compiled his encyclopedia, entitled Sha'ar ha-Shamayim (Door of Heaven) some time after the 1270s, probably still at the end of the thirteenth century. The work contains many quotations and even whole treatises from previous translations of works written in Arabic.

Following Shem-Tov ibn Falaquera, and according to his own introduction, he divided or planned to divide his work into three parts, dealing respectively with physics, astronomy and metaphysics. The metaphysics part is not extant, but some later editions of the work moved a chapter on the soul from physics to the end and defined it to be the metaphysics part. In the original setup, as found in the manuscripts, the contents are as follows:

1. physics, including natural phenomena, metals, plants, animals, man, a chapter on dreams, and a chapter on the soul;
2. astronomy, taken chiefly from Al-Fargani and the Almagest.

Among the Greek authors cited are Alexander of Aphrodisias, Aristotle, Empedocles, Galen, Hippocrates, Homer, Plato, Ptolemy, Pythagoras, Themistius, and Theophrastus; and among those writing in Arabic: Ali ibn Abbas al-Magusi, Ali ibn Ridwan, Averroes, Avicenna, Costa ibn Lucca, Al-Farabi, Al-Fergani, Hunayn ibn Ishaq, Isaac Israeli, Ibn Tufail, and Ibn Zuhr. Another important source is Maimonides.

The work was published, among others, in Venice in 1547 and Rödelheim in 1801. The Venice edition follows the original order, but the Rödelheim edition moved the chapter on the soul to the end and claims it is the metaphysics part.

== Family ==
Abraham Zacuto claimed in 1504 that Gerson ben Solomon was the father of Levi ben Gerson (Gersonides). This is possible, but very uncertain.

== Bibliography ==
- Robinson, James T. (2000). "Gershom ben Solomon of Arles' Sha'ar ha-Shamayim: Its Sources and Use of Sources". In Harvey, Steven (ed.). The medieval Hebrew encyclopedias of science and philosophy. Kluwer Academic Publishers. pp. 248–274. ISBN 0-7923-6242-X.
- Steinschneider, Moritz, Catalogus Librorum Hebræorum in Bibliotheca Bodleiana, col. 1014
- —, Hebräische Übersetzungen, pp. 9 et seq.
- Gross, Henri, in Monatsschrift, xxx 20 et seq.
- —, Gallia Judaica. Paris: Libraire Léopold Cerf, 1897
- Senior Sachs, Kerem Chemed, viii 153 et seq.
- Rossi, Giovanni Bernardo de and Hamberger, C.H., Historisches Wörterbuch der Jüdischen Schriftsteller, p. 69
- Revue des Études Juives, v. 278, xvi, 186

A number of citations are to be found in David Kaufmann, Die Sinne. (See index.)
