= Accademia degli Infiammati =

The Accademia degli Infiammati ("Academy of the Burning Ones") was a short-lived but influential philosophical and literary academy in Padua, in northern Italy. It was founded in 1540 by Leone Orsini, and was dissolved somewhere between 1545 and 1550.

This academy should not be confused with another Accademia degli Infiammati which was established at Forlimpopoli in 1624 by Dominican friar Giovanni della Robbia.

The Paduan Academy's emblem featured Hercules on fire on Mount Oeta, with the motto Arso il mortale al ciel n’andrà l’eterno ("Burned being the Mortal, to Heaven will Ascend the Eternal"). Notable members and collaborators were Sperone Speroni, Benedetto Varchi, Pietro Aretino, Girolamo Preti, Luigi Alamanni, Ugolino Martelli, Alessandro Piccolomini, and Angelo Beolco (el Ruzante).

Some of the Academy's activities were conducted in Greek and Latin. However, the vulgar Venetian and Tuscan languages became prevalent after Speroni, a staunch defender of the vernacular, presided over the academy in 1542.

In this period the Academy promoted lectures (Lezioni) on vernacular poetry, such as on Bembo's sonnets Piansi e cantai l'aspra guerra and Verdeggi all'Apennin la fronte, e 'l petto, by Martelli, and on Forteguerri's sonnet Ora ten va superbo, or corre altero, by Piccolomini.

In 1540, Giovanni Mazzuoli da Strada founded at his home in Florence the Accademia degli Umidi ("Academy of the Wet Ones"). Originally meant to be just a parody of the newly created Paduan Academy, devoted to amateur and burlesque activities, it eventually became the respectable and prestigious Accademia Fiorentina.
