= Wilkins (crater) =

Lunar impact crater

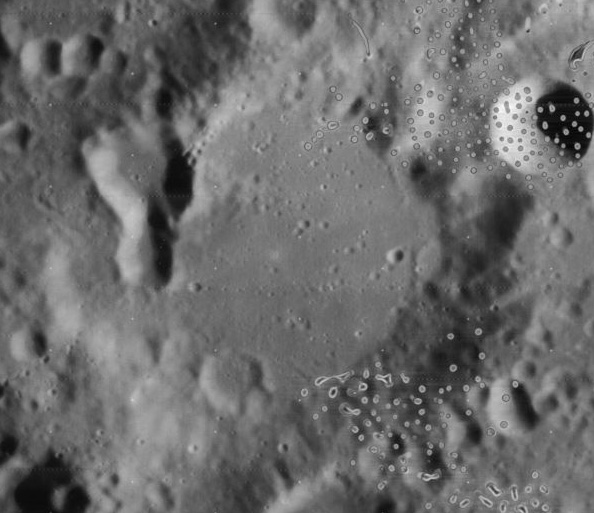
- Lunar Orbiter 4 image (spots are blemishes on original image)
- Coordinates: 29.4°S 19.6°E
- Diameter: 57 km
- Depth: 1.2 km
- Colongitude: 341° at sunrise
- Eponym: H. Percival Wilkins

Wilkins is a lunar impact crater that lies in the rugged highlands in the southeastern part of the Moon's near side. It is located to the southwest of the crater Pons and the long Rupes Altai scarp. Just to the southeast lies the larger crater Zagut, and to the north-northwest is the still-larger Sacrobosco. Wilkins is 57 kilometers in diameter.

The outer rim of Wilkins has received considerable damage, leaving sections nearly disintegrated. The most intact portion is in the south, although even this rim is worn and has a valley to the southwest. There is a narrow curving gap in the western rim, with the northern edge formed by a pair of small, joined craters that include Wilkins A. The rim to the northeast barely survives, and the rim here is low and scarred by valleys and old craters. The interior floor of Wilkins is relatively flat and featureless, except for a ghost-crater rim along the southwest edge. The ray material from Tycho lies north of the crater rim.

The crater is named for the 20th-century Welsh amateur Moon-mapper Hugh Percy Wilkins.

== Satellite craters ==
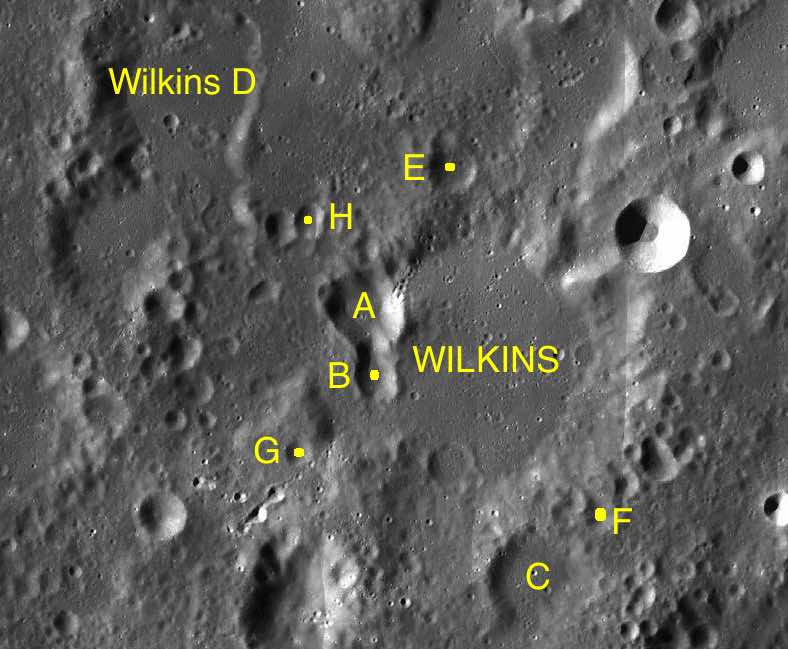
Wilkins and its satellite craters

By convention these features are identified on lunar maps by placing the letter on the side of the crater midpoint that is closest to Wilkins.

Wilkins	Latitude	Longitude	Diameter
A	29.1° S	18.9° E	13 km
B	29.5° S	18.9° E	8 km
C	30.8° S	20.1° E	20 km
D	28.0° S	17.7° E	34 km
E	28.3° S	19.5° E	9 km
F	30.3° S	20.4° E	7 km
G	30.0° S	18.4° E	6 km
H	28.6° S	18.5° E	6 km
