= Zagut (crater) =

Lunar impact crater

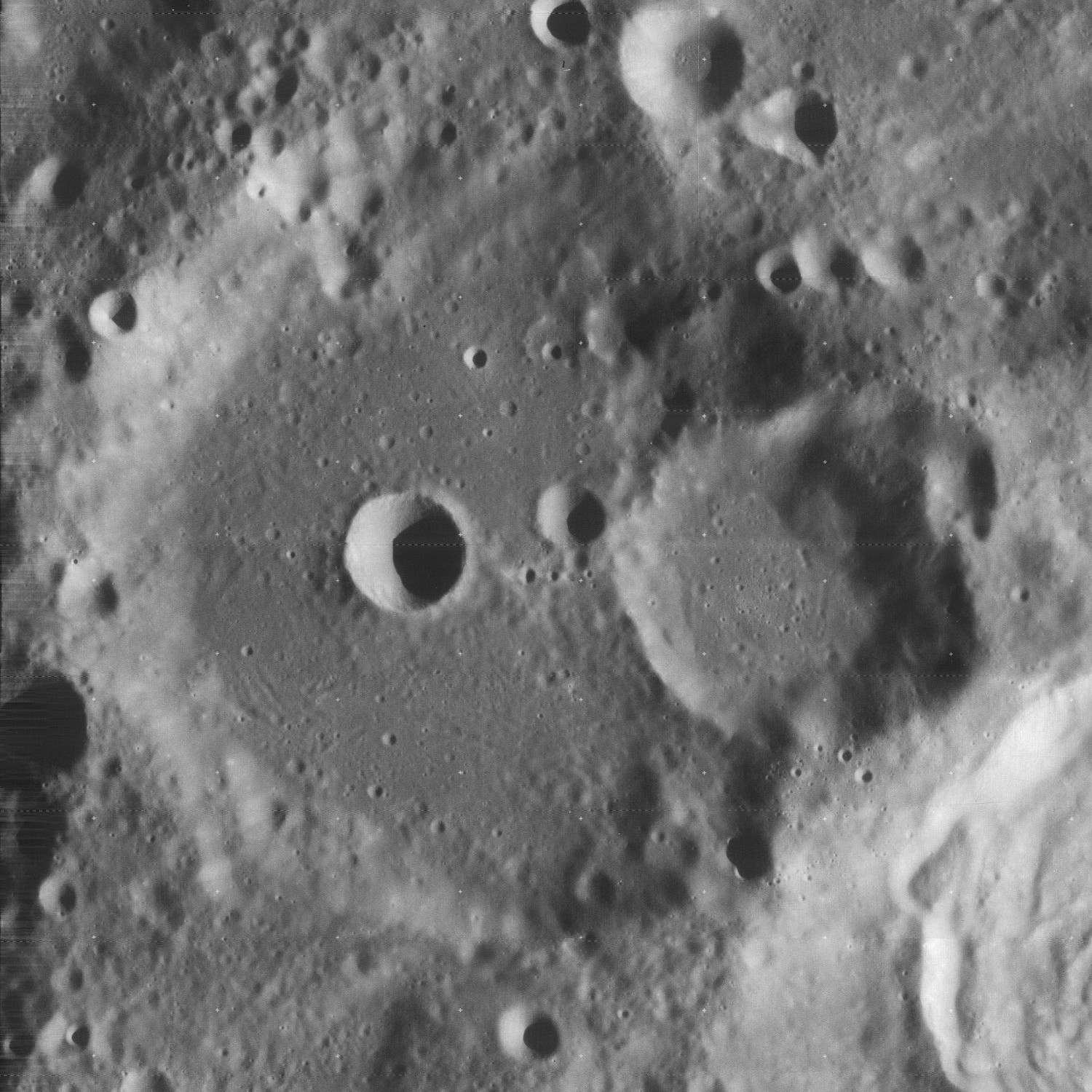
- Lunar Orbiter 4 image
- Coordinates: 31.94°S 21.89°E
- Diameter: 78.92 km
- Depth: 3.2 km
- Colongitude: 339° at sunrise
- Formation: Pre-Nectarian
- Eponym: Abraham Zacuto

Zagut (Zacut) is a crater located in the heavily impacted southeast sector of the Moon. It is almost surrounded by other named craters, with Wilkins to the northwest, Lindenau to the east, Rabbi Levi in the southeast, and Celsius to the southwest. It is named after Jewish Spanish astronomer and rabbi Abraham Zacuto.

On the lunar geologic timescale, this crater dates to the Pre-Nectarian epoch. The rim of Zagut (Zacut) is worn and irregular, especially to the north and east. The east rim is overlain by Zagut E, a crater with an irregular and flat floor. The floor of Zagut itself is also relatively flat, and the center is occupied by the crater Zagut A instead of a peak.

== Satellite craters ==
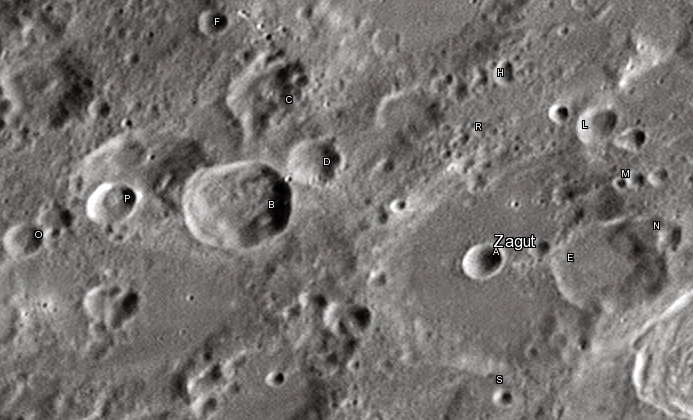
Zagut crater and its satellite craters taken from Earth in 2012 at the University of Hertfordshire's Bayfordbury Observatory with the telescopes Meade LX200 14" and Lumenera Skynyx 2-1

By convention these features are identified on lunar maps by placing the letter on the side of the crater midpoint that is closest to Zagut.

Zagut	Latitude	Longitude	Diameter
A	32.0° S	21.6° E	11 km
B	32.1° S	18.7° E	32 km
C	30.8° S	18.5° E	24 km
D	31.4° S	19.3° E	16 km
E	31.7° S	23.1° E	35 km
F	30.2° S	17.5° E	8 km
H	29.9° S	20.7° E	8 km
K	31.7° S	22.2° E	7 km
L	30.3° S	22.1° E	12 km
M	30.8° S	22.9° E	6 km
N	31.2° S	23.5° E	9 km
O	33.0° S	16.7° E	11 km
P	32.4° S	17.4° E	14 km
R	30.8° S	20.7° E	4 km
S	33.3° S	22.6° E	7 km
