= Seymour Feldman =

American academic (born 1932)

- Born: 1932 (age 93–94)
- Occupations: Emeritus Professor and Philosopher
- Awards: National Jewish Book Award in Scholarship (1985) Prix annuel Kenneth B. Smilen and Jewish Museum Annual Award (1985) Doctor Honoris Causa Jewish Theological Seminary (1987)

Academic background
- Education: Cornell University (B.A., 1954); Jewish Theological Seminary of America (M.A.); Columbia University (Ph.D., 1963)
- Academic advisors: Morris Goldfarb, Moshe Greenberg, Salo Wittmayer Baron, Charles Touati

Seymour Feldman is an American academic, Emeritus Professor and philosopher specializing in medieval and ancient philosophy at Rutgers University.

== Education ==
Feldman received his undergraduate degree at Cornell University (1950-1954), his MA in Hebrew Literature at Jewish Theological Seminary, and his doctor of philosophy at Columbia University in 1963.

During his time at Cornell, Feldman entered an independent three-year intensive biblical studies program under the Hillel Rabbi, Morris Goldfarb. To this end, Feldman continued his Bible and Talmud studies in the summer under Moshe Greenberg. At JTS, Feldman was influenced by Shalom Spiegel.

== Career ==
His scholarship focuses on medieval jewish philosophy, especially Gersonides, and Spinoza. Salo Baron invited him to translate Gersonides' major philosophical work, The Wars of the Lord, which had not yet been rendered into a modern language. Professor Charles Touati provided Feldman with guidance on the work. In 1985, Feldman's translation of Wars of the Lord received the National Jewish Book Award in Scholarship.

At Rutgers College, Seymour was an advisor in 1995 to Jonathan Matkowsky, a Henry Rutgers Scholar who conducted independent research with Seymour as part of the Henry Rutgers Scholars Program on how to interpret the Book of Job based on Maimonides' Theory of Divine Providence in the Guide of the Perplexed.

== Awards and prizes ==
Seymour Feldman received several notable awards and prizes throughout his career, recognizing his significant contributions to Jewish studies. These include the Kenneth B. Smilen (1985) and the Jewish Museum Annual Award in 1985 for his translation of Gersonides' "The Wars of the Lord," Volume 1. He was also honored with the National Jewish Book Award for Scholarship in the same year. In 1987, he was granted an honorary Doctor of Hebrew Letters degree from The Jewish Theological Seminary.

== Selected works ==
- Philosophy in a Time of Crisis: Don Isaac Abravanel: Defender of the Faith. Routledge; 1st edition. 2012. ISBN 0700715908
- Gersonides: Judaism within the Limits of Reason (Littman Library of Jewish Civilization). The Littman Library of Jewish Civilization in association with Liverpool University Press; 1st edition. 2010. ISBN 1904113443
- Levi ben Gershon. The Wars of the Lord. English translation by Seymour Feldman. Philadelphia: Jewish Publication Society; First Edition. 1984–1999. ISBN 9780827602205, ISBN 9780827606388, ISBN 9780827602755, ISBN 0827602200. ISBN 0827606389, ISBN 0827602758

== Articles and chapters in books ==
- Research on Arabic Logic, published in The Journal of Philosophy, Vol. 61 (1964): pp. 724–733.
- Gersonides' Proofs for the Creation of the Universe, published in Proceedings of the American Academy for Jewish Research, Vol. 3 (1961): pp. 113–138.
- A Scholastic Misinterpretation of Maimonides' Doctrine of Divine Attributes, published in Journal of Jewish Studies, Vol. 19 (1968), pp. 2–39.
- Did the Scholastics Have an Accurate Knowledge of Maimonides? published in Studies in Medieval Culture, Vol. 3 (1970): pp. 11–150.
- Platonic Themes in Gersonides' Cosmology, published in Salo W. Baron Jubilee Volume, Volume 1 (Jerusalem, 1975), pp. 383–405.
- Gersonides on the Possibility of Conjunction with the Agent Intellect, published in Association for Jewish Studies Review, Vol. 3 (1988): pp. 99–120.
- The Theory of Eternal Creation in Hasdai Crescas and Some of his Predecessors, published in Viator, Vol. 11 (1980): pp. 289–320.
- Crescas' Theological Determinism, published in Da'at, Vol. D (1982): pp. 3–28.
- A Debate Concerning Determinism in Late Medieval Jewish Philosophy, published in Proceedings of the American Academy for Jewish Research, Vol. 5 (1984): pp. 15–54
- The Binding of Isaac: A Test-case of Divine Foreknowledge, in Divine Omniscience and Omnipotence in Medieval Philosophy, edited by Tamar Rudavsky (Dordrecht: Reidel, 1985), pp. 105–134.
- The End of the Universe in Medieval Jewish Philosophy, published in Association of Jewish Studies Review, Vol. 11 (1986): pp. 53–75.
- Sun Stand Still—A Philosophical-Astronomical Midrash, published in Proceedings of the Ninth World Congress of Jewish Studies (Jerusalem, 1986), pp. 17–84.
- Philoponus on the Metaphysics of Creation, in A Straight Path: Studies in Medieval Philosophy and Culture. Essays in Honor of Arthur Hyman, edited by J. Hackell, M. Hyman, J. Long, and C. Manekin (Washington, DC: Catholic University Press, 1988), pp. 74–85.
- (heb) The First Jewish Critique of Spinoza, lyyun 37(1988): 222-237.
- Abravanel on Maimonides' Critique of the Kalam Arguments for Creation, published in Maimonidean Studies, Vol. 1 (1990): pp. 49–62.
- Platonic Themes in Gersonides' Doctrine of the Active Intellect, published in Neoplatonism and Jewish Thought, edited by L.R. Goodman (Albany: State University of New York Press, 1992), pp. 255–217.
- Spinoza: A Marrano of Reason?" published in Inquiry, Vol. 35 (1992): pp. 37-53.
- R. Isaac Abravanel's Defense of Creation ex nihilo, published in Proceedings of the 11th World Congress of Jewish Studies, Division C (Jerusalem, 1994): pp. 33-40.
- Spinoza, published in History of Jewish Philosophy, edited by D. Frank and O. Leaman (London: Routledge, 1997), pp. 612-635.
- 1492: A House Divided, published in Crisis and Creativity in the Sephardic World, 1391-1492, edited by B. Gampel (New York: Columbia University Press, 1997), pp. 35-58.
- Philosophy and Prophecy in Isaac Abravanel, published in Perspectives on Jewish Thought and Mysticism, edited by A. Ivry, E. Wolfson, and A. Arkush (Amsterdam: Harcourt Academic Press, 1998), pp. 223-236.
- An Averroist Solution to a Maimonidean Perplexity, published in Maimonidean Studies, Vol. 4 (2000): pp. 15-30.
- In the Beginning God Created the Heavens: Philoponus' De opificio mundi and Rabbinic Exegesis—A Study in Comparative Midrash," published in Torah et science: perspectives historiques et théologiques, edited by G. Freudenlal, J-P. Rothschild, and G. Oahan (Paris-Louvain: Peeters 2001), pp. 37–70.
- The End and Aftereffects of Medieval Jewish Philosophy, published in The Cambridge Companion to Medieval Jewish Philosophy, edited by D. Frank and O. Leaman (Cambridge, UK: Cambridge University Press, 2003), pp. 414–445.
- Maimonides: A Guide for Posterity, published in The Cambridge Companion to Maimonides, edited by K. Seeskin (Cambridge, UK: Cambridge University Press, 2005), pp. 324–360.
- Platonic Cosmologies in the Dialoghi d'Amore of Leone Ebreo (Judah Abravanel), published in Viator, Vol. 36 (2005): pp. 557–582.
- Levi ben Gershom/Gersonides: Philosophy and Exegesis, published in Hebrew Bible/Old Testament: the History of its Interpretation, Volume 2, edited by M. Saebo (Göttingen: Vandenhoeck and Ruprecht, 2008), pp. 64–75.
- Divine Omnipotence, Omniscience and Human Freedom, published in The Cambridge History of Jewish Philosophy, edited by Steven Nadler and T. Rudavsky (Cambridge, UK: Cambridge University Press, 2009), pp. 659–706.
- On Plural Universes: A Debate in Medieval Jewish Philosophy and the Duhem-Pines Thesis, published in Aleph, Vol. 12, Issue 2 (2012), pp. 329–366.
- A Renaissance Rabbi with Platonic Leanings, published in Viator, Vol. 48, Issue 1 (2017), pp. 315–336.
- Gersonides and His Sephardic Critics, published in Gersonides' Afterlife, edited by O. Elior, G. Freudenthal, and D. Wirmer, Leiden (2020), pp. 132–158.
- Orobio de Castro and Spinoza on Creation ex Nihilo, published in Philosophical Case in Defense of Divine and Natural Truth, Certamen philosophicum propugnatae veritatis divinae ac naturalis (1703) by Isaac Orobio de Castro, translated by Walter Hilliger, NY (2020), pp. 18–41;
- On Creation, published in Thirty Problems Concerning Creation by Menasseh ben Israel, (De Creatione Problemata XXX Amsterdam,1635), translated by Yannik Pisanne and Walter Hilliger, NY (2023) pp. 18–40.
- Orobio de Castro and Spinoza on Creation ex Nihilo, published in Certamen Philosophicum: Philosophical Combat for Divine and Natural Truth. 2nd Revised Edition. Introduction and notes by Seymour Feldman. Prologue and translation by Walter Hilliger. Le Cercle Hilliger, 2024, pp. 15–32, notes pp. 138–141, ISBN 978-2-494509-39-9. Collection Veritas è terra orietur. ISSN 3003-8898. 172 pages.
