= Alessandro Piccolomini =

Italian humanist

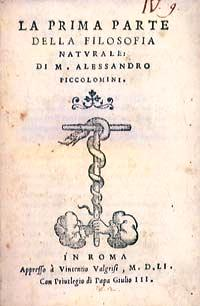
Cover of Filosofia naturale.

Alessandro Piccolomini (13 June 1508 – 12 March 1579) was an Italian humanist, astronomer and philosopher from Siena, who promoted the popularization in the vernacular of Latin and Greek scientific and philosophical treatises. His early works include Il Dialogo della bella creanza delle donne, o Raffaella (1539) and the comedies Amor costante, and Alessandro, (other titles are erroneously attributed to him) which were sponsored and produced by the Sienese Accademia degli Intronati, of which he was a member and an official. Much of his literary production consisted of translations from the Classics, of which Book XIII of Ovid's Metamorphoses and book VI of the Aeneid are early examples. In 1540, while a student at the University of Padua, he helped found the Infiammati Academy, in which he gave lectures in philosophy. (He never taught at the University of Padua, as is often stated incorrectly.) His poetry, in which he followed the Petrarchan tradition, appeared first in various contemporary collections, and in 1549 he published as a single volume one hundred sonnets titled Cento sonetti. Later in life, he established in his sister-in-law's Villa of Poggiarello of Stigliano, near Siena, where he attended the revision of his previous essays, and where he wrote all his late works, as the translation of Aristotle's Poetics on which he wrote a learned commentary issued in 1575. His interest in Aristotle included the publication of a paraphrase of Aristotle's Rhetoric with commentary. In his Trattato della grandezza della terra e dell'acqua (1558), he opposed the Aristotelian and Ptolemaic opinion that water was more extensive than land.

The treatises Sfera del mondo e De le stelle fisse (The sphere of the world and The fixed stars) (1540), in which he adhered to Ptolemaic theories, were some of his major contributions to the field of astronomy. De le stelle fisse contained what is generally regarded as the first printed star atlas, consisting of charts of 47 of the 48 Ptolemaic constellations (Equuleus was missing). Stars down to fourth magnitude were shown, based on Ptolemy’s catalogue in the Almagest. In this atlas Piccolomini labelled the stars with Roman letters, a forerunner of the system of Greek letter identifications that was introduced by Johann Bayer over 60 years later.

Piccolomini also wrote, at the behest of Cosimo de' Medici, a proposal for reforming the calendar (1578). In 1574 Pope Gregory XIII appointed him titular bishop of Patras (Patrae) and Coadjutor Archbishop of Siena.

His comedy Alessandro was adapted by George Chapman into May Day (printed 1611).

The lunar crater Piccolomini is named after him.

== See also ==
- Piccolomini

== Works ==
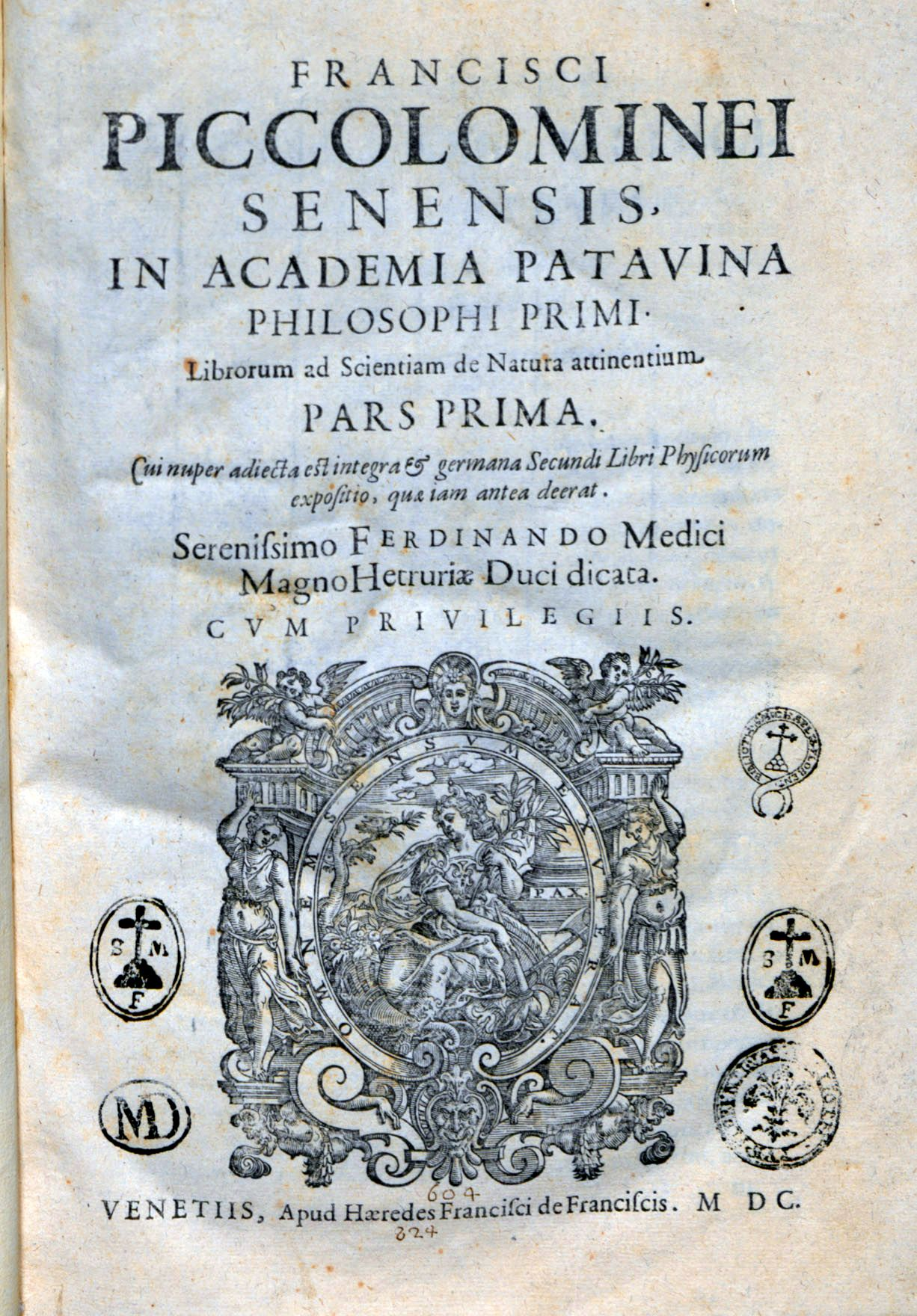
Libri ad scientiam de natura attinentes, 1600

- Commentarium de certitudine mathematicarum disciplinarum (in Latin). 1547.
- Sfera del mondo (in Italian). Venezia: Bartolomeo Cesano. 1553.
- Sfera del mondo (in Italian). Venezia: Giovanni Varisco & C. 1561.
- Speculationi de' pianeti (in Italian). Venezia: Giovanni Varisco & C. 1563.
- Libri ad scientiam de natura attinentes (in Latin). Vol. 1. Venezia: eredi Francesco De Franceschi (senese). 1600.
- Libri ad scientiam de natura attinentes (in Latin). Vol. 2. Venezia: eredi Francesco De Franceschi (senese). 1600.
