= Gersonides =

Medieval Jewish philosopher

- Born: Levi ben Gershon (לוי בן גרשון); 1288; Bagnols-sur-Cèze, France
- Died: 1344 (aged 55–56); Perpignan, France

Philosophical work
- Era: Medieval philosophy
- Region: Jewish philosophy
- Main interests: Religious philosophy, mathematics

Levi ben Gershon (1288 – 20 April 1344), better known by his Graecized name as Gersonides, or by his Latinized name Magister Leo Hebraeus, or in Hebrew by the abbreviation of first letters as RaLBaG, was a medieval French Jewish philosopher, Talmudist, mathematician, physician and astronomer/astrologer. He was born at Bagnols in Languedoc, France. According to Abraham Zacuto and others, he was the son of Gerson ben Solomon Catalan.

== Biography ==
As in the case of the other medieval Jewish philosophers, little is known of his life. His family had been distinguished for piety and exegetical skill in Talmud, but though he was known in the Jewish community by commentaries on certain books of the Bible, he never seems to have accepted any rabbinical post. It has been suggested that the uniqueness of his opinions may have put obstacles in the way of his advancement to a higher position or office. He is known to have been at Avignon and Orange during his life, and is believed to have died in 1344, though Zacuto asserts that he died at Perpignan in 1370.

Gersonides is known for his unorthodox views and rigid Aristotelianism, which eventually led him to rationalize many of the miracles in the Bible. His commentary on the Bible was sharply criticized by the most prominent scholars, such as Abarbanel, Chisdai Crescas, and Rivash, the latter accusing him of heresy and almost banning his works.

== Philosophical and religious works ==
Part of his writings consist of commentaries on the portions of Aristotle then known, or rather of commentaries on the commentaries of Averroes. Some of these are printed in the early Latin editions of Aristotle's works. His most important treatise, that by which he has a place in the history of philosophy, is entitled Sefer Milhamot Ha-Shem, ("The Wars of the Lord"), and occupied twelve years in composition (1317–1329). A portion of it, containing an elaborate survey of astronomy as known to the Arabs, was translated into Latin in 1342 at the request of Pope Clement VI.

The Wars of the Lord is modeled after the plan of the great work of Jewish philosophy, the Guide for the Perplexed of Maimonides. It may be regarded as a criticism of some elements of Maimonides' syncretism of Aristotelianism and rabbinic Jewish thought. Ralbag's treatise strictly adhered to Aristotelian thought. The Wars of the Lord review:

1. the doctrine of the soul, in which Gersonides defends the theory of impersonal reason as mediating between God and man, and explains the formation of the higher reason (or acquired intellect, as it was called) in humanity—his view being thoroughly realist and resembling that of Avicebron;
2. prophecy;
3. and 4. God's knowledge of facts and providence, in which is advanced the theory that God does not decide individual facts. While there is general providence for all, special providence only extends to those whose reason has been enlightened;
5. celestial substances, treating of the strange spiritual hierarchy which the Jewish philosophers of the middle ages accepted from the Neoplatonists and the pseudo-Dionysius, and also giving, along with astronomical details, much of astrological theory; and
6. creation and miracles, in respect to which Gersonides deviates widely from the position of Maimonides.

Gersonides was also the author of commentaries on the Pentateuch, Joshua, Judges, I & II Samuel, I & II Kings, Proverbs, Job, Ecclesiastes, Song of Songs, Ruth, Esther, Daniel, Ezra-Nehemiah, and Chronicles. He makes reference to a commentary on Isaiah, but it is not extant.

=== Views on God and omniscience ===
In contrast to the theology held by other Jewish thinkers, Jewish theologian Louis Jacobs argues, Gersonides held that God does not have complete foreknowledge of human acts. "Gersonides, bothered by the old question of how God's foreknowledge is compatible with human freedom, holds that what God knows beforehand is all the choices open to each individual. God does not know, however, which choice the individual, in his freedom, will make."

Another neoclassical Jewish proponent of self-limited omniscience was Abraham ibn Daud. "Whereas the earlier Jewish philosophers extended the omniscience of God to include the free acts of man, and had argued that human freedom of decision was not affected by God's foreknowledge of its results, Ibn Daud, evidently following Alexander of Aphrodisias, excludes human action from divine foreknowledge. God, he holds, limited his omniscience even as He limited His omnipotence in regard to human acts".

The view that God does not have foreknowledge of moral decisions which was advanced by ibn Daud and Gersonides (Levi ben Gershom) is not quite as isolated as Rabbi Bleich indicates, and it enjoys the support of two highly respected Acharonim, Rabbi Yeshayahu Horowitz (Shelah haKadosh) and Rabbi Chaim ibn Attar (Or haHayim haKadosh). The former takes the views that God cannot know which moral choices people will make, but this does not impair His perfection. The latter considers that God could know the future if He wished, but deliberately refrains from using this ability in order to avoid the conflict with free will.

Rabbi Yeshayahu Horowitz explained the apparent paradox of his position by citing the old question, "Can God create a rock so heavy that He cannot pick it up?" He said that we cannot accept free choice as a creation of God's, and simultaneously question its logical compatibility with omnipotence.

See further discussion in Free will in Jewish thought.

=== Views of the afterlife ===
Gersonides posits that people's souls are composed of two parts: a material, or human, intellect; and an acquired, or agent, intellect. The material intellect is inherent in every person, and gives people the capacity to understand and learn. This material intellect is mortal, and dies with the body. However, he also posits that the soul also has an acquired intellect. This survives death, and can contain the accumulated knowledge that the person acquired during his lifetime. For Gersonides, Seymour Feldman points out,

Man is immortal insofar as he attains the intellectual perfection that is open to him. This means that man becomes immortal only if and to the extent that he acquires knowledge of what he can in principle know, e.g. mathematics and the natural sciences. This knowledge survives his bodily death and constitutes his immortality.

=== Talmudic works ===
Gersonides was the author of the following Talmudic and halakhic works:

- Shaarei Tsedek (published at Leghorn, 1800): a commentary on the thirteen halachic rules of Rabbi Yishmael;
- Mechokek Safun, an interpretation of the aggadic material in the fifth chapter of Tractate Bava Basra;
- A commentary to tractate Berachos;
- two responsa.

Only the first work is extant.

== Works in mathematics and astronomy/astrology ==
Gersonides was the first to make a number of major mathematical and scientific advances, though since he wrote only in Hebrew and few of his writings were translated to other languages, his influence on non-Jewish thought was limited.

Gersonides wrote Maaseh Hoshev in 1321 dealing with arithmetical operations including extraction of square and cube roots, various algebraic identities, certain sums including sums of consecutive integers, squares, and cubes, binomial coefficients, and simple combinatorial identities. The work is notable for its early use of proof by mathematical induction, and pioneering work in combinatorics. The title Maaseh Hoshev literally means the Work of the thinker, but it is also a pun on a biblical phrase meaning "clever work". Maaseh Hoshev is sometimes mistakenly referred to as Sefer Hamispar (The Book of Number), which is an earlier and less sophisticated work by Rabbi Abraham ben Meir ibn Ezra (1090–1167). In 1342, Gersonides wrote On Sines, Chords and Arcs, which examined trigonometry, in particular proving the sine law for plane triangles and giving five-figure sine tables.

One year later, at the request of the bishop of Meaux, he wrote The Harmony of Numbers in which he considers a problem of Philippe de Vitry involving so-called harmonic numbers, which have the form 2^{m}·3^{n}. The problem was to characterize all pairs of harmonic numbers differing by 1. Gersonides proved that there are only four such pairs: (1,2), (2,3), (3,4) and (8,9).

He is also credited to have invented the Jacob's staff, an instrument to measure the angular distance between celestial objects. It is described as consisting

…of a staff of 4.5 feet (1.4 m) long and about one inch (2.5 cm) wide, with six or seven perforated tablets which could slide along the staff, each tablet being an integral fraction of the staff length to facilitate calculation, used to measure the distance between stars or planets, and the altitudes and diameters of the Sun, Moon and stars.

Gersonides observed a solar eclipse on March 3, 1337. After he had observed this event he proposed a new theory of the sun which he proceeded to test by further observations. Another eclipse observed by Gersonides was the eclipse of the Moon on 3 October 1335. He described a geometrical model for the motion of the Moon and made other astronomical observations of the Moon, Sun and planets using a camera obscura. Some of his beliefs were well wide of the truth, such as his belief that the Milky Way was on the sphere of the fixed stars and shines by the reflected light of the Sun.

Gersonides was also the earliest known mathematician to have used the technique of mathematical induction in a systematic and self-conscious fashion and anticipated Galileo's error theory.

The lunar crater Rabbi Levi is named after him.

Gersonides believed that astrology was real, and developed a naturalistic, non-supernatural explanation of how it works. Julius Guttman explained that for Gersonides, astrology was:

founded on the metaphysical doctrine of the dependence of all earthly occurrences upon the heavenly world. The general connection imparted to the prophet by the active intellect is the general order of the astrological constellation. The constellation under which a man is born determines his nature and fate, and constellations as well determine the life span of nations. …The active intellect knows the astrological order, from the most general form of the constellations to their last specification, which in turn contains all of the conditions of occurrence of a particular event. Thus, when a prophet deals with the destiny of a particular person or human group, he receives from the active intellect a knowledge of the order of the constellations, and with sufficient precision to enable him to predict its fate in full detail. …This astrological determinism has only one limitation. The free will of man could shatter the course of action ordained for him by the stars; prophecy could therefore predict the future on the basis of astrological determination only insofar as the free will of man does not break through the determined course of things.

=== Estimation of stellar distances and refutation of Ptolemy's model ===
Gersonides appears to be the only astronomer before modern times to have surmised that the fixed stars are much further away than the planets. Whereas all other astronomers put the fixed stars on a rotating sphere just beyond the outer planets, Gersonides estimated the distance to the fixed stars to be no less than 159,651,513,380,944 earth radii, or about 100,000 lightyears in modern units.

Using data he collected from his own observations, Gersonides refuted Ptolemy's model in what the notable physicist Yuval Ne'eman has considered as "one of the most important insights in the history of science, generally missed in telling the story of the transition from epicyclic corrections to the geocentric model to Copernicus' heliocentric model". Ne'eman argued that after Gersonides reviewed Ptolemy's model with its epicycles he realized that it could be checked, by measuring the changes in the apparent brightnesses of Mars and looking for cyclical changes along the conjectured epicycles. These thus ceased being dogma, they were a theory that had to be experimentally verified, "à la Popper". Gersonides developed tools for these measurements, essentially pinholes and the camera obscura.

The results of his observations did not fit Ptolemy's model at all. Concluding that the model was inadequate, Gersonides tried (unsuccessfully) to improve on it. That challenge was finally answered, of course, by Copernicus and Kepler three centuries later, but Gersonides was the first to falsify the Alexandrian dogma - the first known instance of modern falsification philosophy. Gersonides also showed that Ptolemy's model for the lunar orbit, though reproducing correctly the evolution of the Moon's position, fails completely in predicting the apparent sizes of the Moon in its motion. Unfortunately, there is no evidence that the findings influenced later generations of astronomers, even though Gersonides' writings were translated and available.

== In modern fiction ==
Gersonides is an important character in the novel The Dream of Scipio by Iain Pears, where he is depicted as the mentor of the protagonist Olivier de Noyen, a non-Jewish poet and intellectual. A (fictional) encounter between Gersonides and Pope Clement VI at Avignon during the Black Death is a major element in the book's plot.

== Awards and honours ==
- 1985: National Jewish Book Award Scholarship for The Wars of the Lord
- The lunar crater Rabbi Levi is named for Gersonides.
