= Stiborius (crater) =

Crater on the Moon

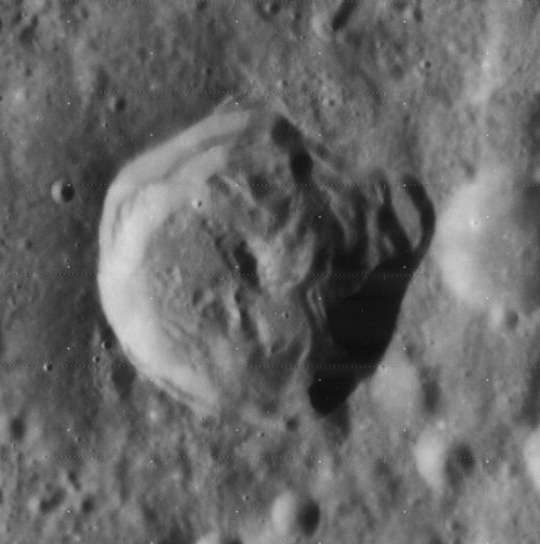
- Lunar Orbiter 4 image
- Coordinates: 34.4°S 32.0°E
- Diameter: 44 km
- Depth: 3.7 km
- Colongitude: 329° at sunrise
- Formation: Upper Imbrian
- Eponym: Andreas Stöberl

Stiborius is a lunar impact crater that lies to the south-southwest of the crater Piccolomini, in the southeastern quadrant of the Moon's near side. To the south-southwest of Stiborius is the smaller Wöhler. Stiborius is 44 kilometers in diameter and 3.7 kilometers deep.

The rim of this crater is well-defined with little appearance of erosion. It is roughly circular in form, but has a prominent outward bulge to the northeast where the side has slumped into the interior. There is a terrace-like shelf along the southeastern and northern inner walls. The interior floor is somewhat irregular, and there is a low central peak at the midpoint that is connected to the northeastern wall by a low ridge. It is from the Upper Imbrian period, 3.8 to 3.2 billion years ago.

It is named after Andreas Stöberl, a 15th-century philosopher, theologian, and astronomer.

== Satellite craters ==
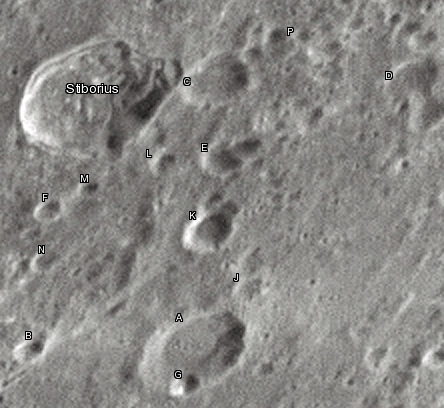
Stiborius crater and its satellite craters taken from Earth in 2012 at the University of Hertfordshire's Bayfordbury Observatory with the telescopes Meade LX200 14" and Lumenera Skynyx 2-1

By convention these features are identified on lunar maps by placing the letter on the side of the crater midpoint that is closest to Stiborius.

Stiborius	Latitude	Longitude	Diameter
A	36.9° S	35.5° E	32 km
B	37.3° S	33.5° E	9 km
C	33.9° S	33.3° E	22 km
D	33.4° S	35.7° E	18 km
E	34.8° S	34.1° E	15 km
F	35.7° S	32.4° E	8 km
G	37.3° S	35.7° E	10 km
J	36.1° S	35.6° E	10 km
K	35.5° S	34.6° E	16 km
L	35.0° S	33.5° E	10 km
M	35.5° S	32.8° E	7 km
N	36.3° S	32.9° E	9 km
P	33.2° S	34.0° E	6 km
