= Rabbi Levi (crater) =

Lunar impact crater

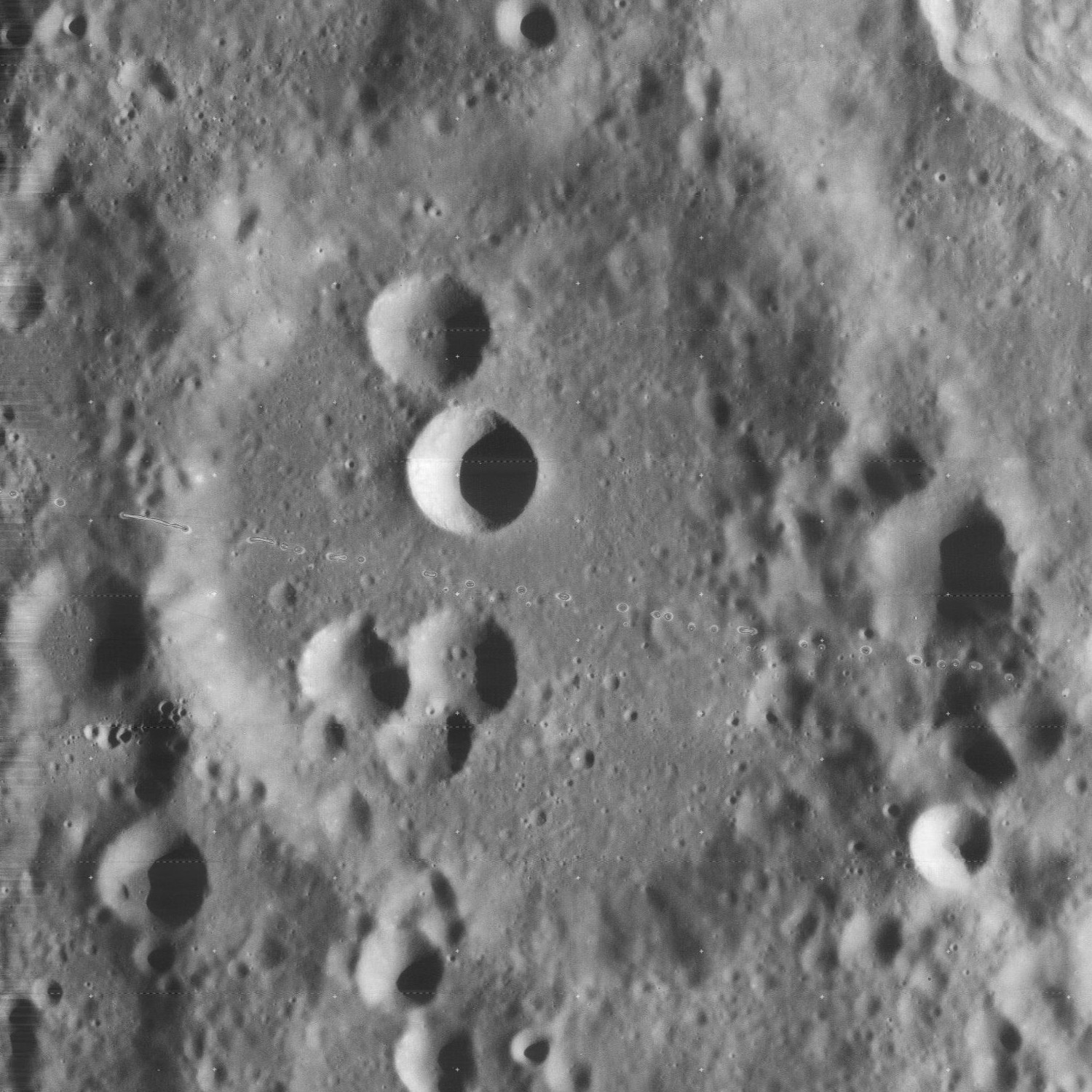
- Lunar Orbiter 4 image
- Coordinates: 34.78°S 23.46°E
- Diameter: 82.44 km
- Depth: 3.5 km
- Colongitude: 336° at sunrise
- Formation: Pre-Nectarian
- Eponym: Levi ben Gershon

Rabbi Levi is a lunar impact crater that is located among the rugged highlands in the southeastern part of the Moon's near side. Several notable craters are located nearby, including Zagut just to the north-northwest, the heavily impacted Riccius to the southeast, and Lindenau to the northeast next to Zagut.

On the lunar geologic timescale, this crater dates to the Pre-Nectarian epoch. It is a heavily worn and eroded crater formation, with several smaller craters lying along the incised rim and across the interior floor. A group of these craters form a cluster in the western part of the floor, consisting of the satellite craters A, L, M, and D, as well as lesser craterlets trailing away to the south-southeast. The largest of these craters is Rabbi Levi L, a bowl-shaped formation just to the northwest of the midpoint. The remainder of the floor is relatively level and nearly featureless. Clusters of craters also lay across the eastern and southwestern sections of the rim.

Attached to the northeast is the remnant of an old formation that intrudes into Rabbi Levi, producing a straightened section of rim along that face. This unnamed formation has been almost completely obliterated, and is overlain in the northwest by Lindenau, and along the outer northeast side by Rothmann.

The crater is named after the Medieval French Jewish scholar Levi ben Gershon, better known by his Graecized name as Gersonides.

== Satellite craters ==
By convention these features are identified on lunar maps by placing the letter on the side of the crater midpoint that is closest to Rabbi Levi.

Rabbi Levi	Latitude	Longitude	Diameter
A	34.3° S	22.7° E	12 km
B	34.5° S	24.8° E	13 km
C	34.3° S	27.0° E	20 km
D	35.4° S	22.8° E	10 km
E	36.7° S	22.1° E	35 km
F	36.0° S	20.5° E	12 km
G	36.9° S	22.0° E	12 km
H	36.4° S	20.2° E	8 km
J	37.6° S	22.7° E	7 km
L	34.7° S	23.0° E	13 km
M	35.2° S	23.2° E	11 km
N	36.4° S	23.7° E	8 km
O	35.7° S	25.1° E	7 km
P	34.5° S	25.8° E	15 km
Q	33.7° S	25.8° E	6 km
R	33.6° S	28.2° E	12 km
S	34.2° S	27.5° E	14 km
T	36.2° S	22.4° E	10 km
U	35.6° S	21.9° E	14 km
