= Bernhard von Lindenau =

German lawyer, astronomer, politician, and art collector (1779–1854)

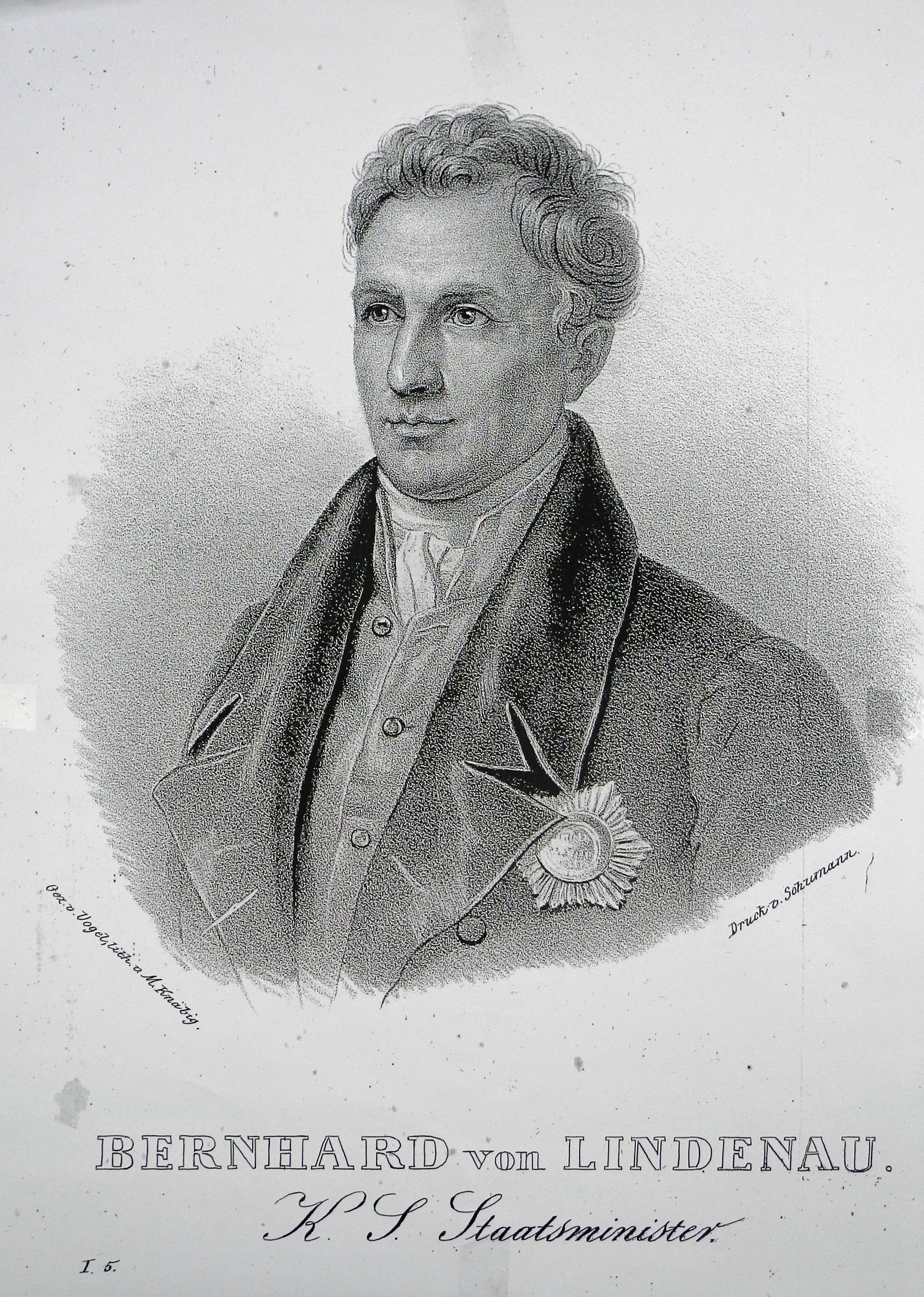
Bernhard von Lindenau.

Baron Bernhard August von Lindenau (11 June 1779 – 21 May 1854) was a German lawyer, astronomer, politician, and art collector.

Lindenau was born in Altenburg, the son of Johann August Lindenau, a regional administrator (Landschaftsdirektor). In 1793, Lindeau began studying law and mathematics at Leipzig, and beginning in 1801 he worked at the astronomical observatory in Seeburg. In 1830 he was the Minister of the Interior during a turbulent period in the history of Saxony. Late in the year he oversaw measures to calm violent protests demanding political reform. From 1831 to 1843 he was Minister-President.

He created a collection of Italian artwork from the 14th and 15th centuries by Florentine painters in an effort to create artistic awareness. He gave his art collection to the city of Altenburg on the condition that they create a museum to display the pieces. This museum was finished in 1875, and became the Lindenau-Museum.

Lindenau edited the Monatliche Correspondenz zur Beförderung der Erd- und Himmels-Kunde starting in 1807. The Journal was founded by Franz Xaver von Zach in 1800 and existed until 1813.

In 1809 he became correspondent of the Royal Institute of the Netherlands, when that became the Royal Netherlands Academy of Arts and Sciences in 1851 he joined as foreign member. Lindenau was elected a Foreign Honorary Member of the American Academy of Arts and Sciences in 1822.

He died in Windischleuba.

== Awards and honors ==
- Asteroid 9322 Lindenau was named for him.
- Lindenau (crater) on the Moon was named for him.
- Lindenau Museum in Altenburg was named after him.
- Lalande Prize in 1812
