= Marbod =

Marbod may refer to:

- Maroboduus (died 37), king of the Marcomanni
- Marbod of Rennes (died 1123), archdeacon and schoolmaster at Angers, bishop of Rennes
