= Lindenau (crater) =

Crater on the Moon

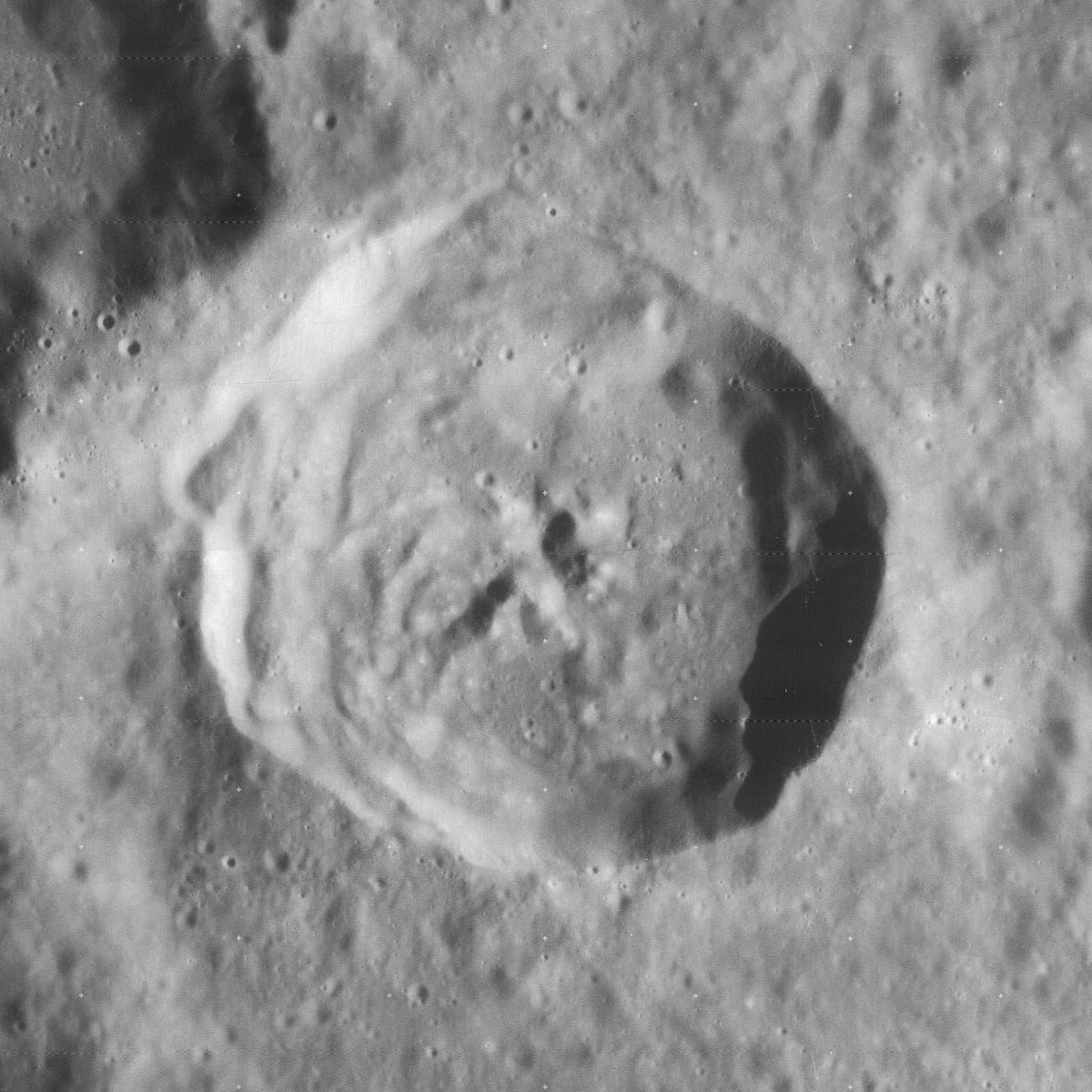
- Lunar Orbiter 4 image, North on the photo is diagonally at about 35 degrees
- Coordinates: 32.35°S 24.77°E
- Diameter: 53.08 km (32.98 mi)
- Depth: 2.9 km (1.8 mi)
- Colongitude: 336° at sunrise
- Formation: Upper Imbrian
- Eponym: Bernhard von Lindenau

Lindenau is a lunar impact crater. It is located beside the east-southeastern rim of the crater Zagut, and to the northeast of Rabbi Levi. To the northeast is the slightly smaller crater Rothmann and the Rupes Altai scarp.

On the lunar geologic timescale, this crater dates from the Upper Imbrian period, 3.8 to 3.2 billion years ago. The rim of this crater has received very little wear, in contrast to the neighboring craters to the west and southwest. The edge is sharp, with a small outer rampart, and there are terraces along parts of the interior wall. Along the western edge is a small outward protrusion where the inner face has slumped somewhat. The interior floor is irregular in places, and there is a formation of central peaks about the midpoint. The infrared spectrum of pure crystalline plagioclase has been identified on the central peak.

This crater is named after the German astronomer Bernhard von Lindenau (1780-1854). Its designation was formally adopted by the International Astronomical Union in 1935.

== Satellite craters ==
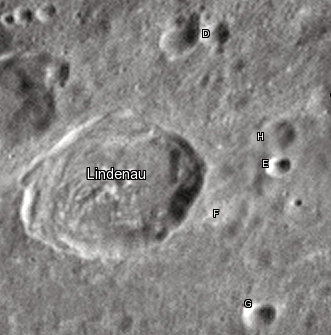
Lindenau crater and its satellite craters taken from Earth in 2012 at the University of Hertfordshire's Bayfordbury Observatory with the telescopes Meade LX200 14" and Lumenera Skynyx 2-1

By convention these features are identified on lunar maps by placing the letter on the side of the crater midpoint that is closest to Lindenau.

Lindenau	Latitude	Longitude	Diameter
D	30.4° S	24.9° E	10 km
E	31.6° S	26.5° E	8 km
F	32.4° S	26.4° E	10 km
G	33.2° S	27.3° E	10 km
H	31.3° S	26.3° E	11 km
