= Rothmann (crater) =

Crater on the Moon

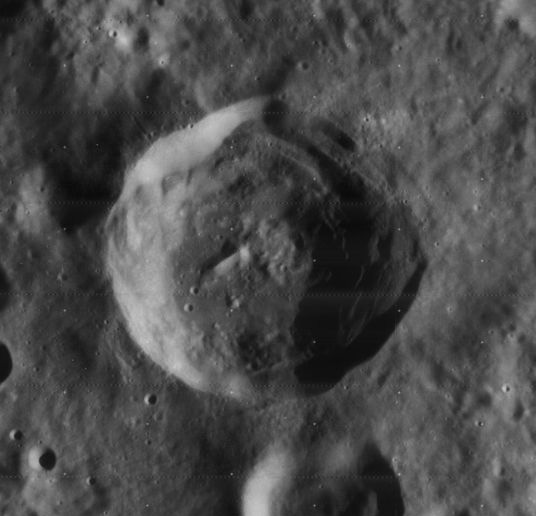
- Lunar Orbiter 4 image
- Coordinates: 30.81°S 27.70°E
- Diameter: 41.67 km
- Depth: 4.2 km
- Colongitude: 333° at sunrise
- Formation: Eratosthenian
- Eponym: Christopher Rothmann

Rothmann is an impact crater that is located in the southeastern part of the Moon's near side, about one crater diameter to the southwest of the Rupes Altai scarp. To the southwest is the slightly larger crater Lindenau.

This is a relatively fresh crater that is not significantly eroded. The outer rim is circular and is not overlaid by craters of note. The inner walls have slumped and formed terraces in places. The interior floor is somewhat irregular, and has a central rise near the midpoint.

Rothmann is a crater of Eratosthenian age.

Rothmann is named after German astronomer Christopher Rothmann.

== Satellite craters ==
By convention these features are identified on lunar maps by placing the letter on the side of the crater midpoint that is closest to Rothmann.

Rothmann	Latitude	Longitude	Diameter
A	29.4° S	27.6° E	8 km
B	31.8° S	28.4° E	21 km
C	28.6° S	25.1° E	19 km
D	28.9° S	22.8° E	14 km
E	32.9° S	29.2° E	10 km
F	29.1° S	28.0° E	7 km
G	28.4° S	24.3° E	92 km
H	29.1° S	25.4° E	11 km
J	29.3° S	25.7° E	8 km
K	28.8° S	24.4° E	6 km
L	29.2° S	28.7° E	14 km
M	31.2° S	29.8° E	16 km
W	30.8° S	26.6° E	11 km
