= Geber (crater) =

Crater on the Moon

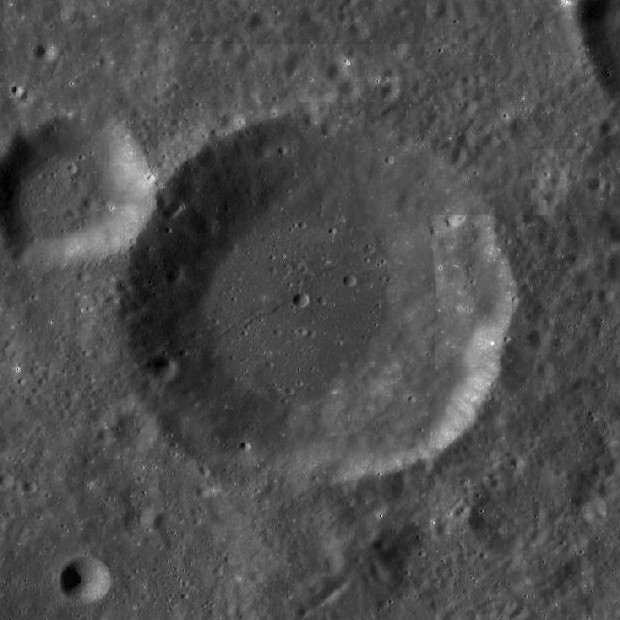
- LRO WAC mosaic
- Coordinates: 19.4°S 13.9°E
- Diameter: 45 km
- Depth: 3.5 km
- Colongitude: 346° at sunrise
- Eponym: Geber

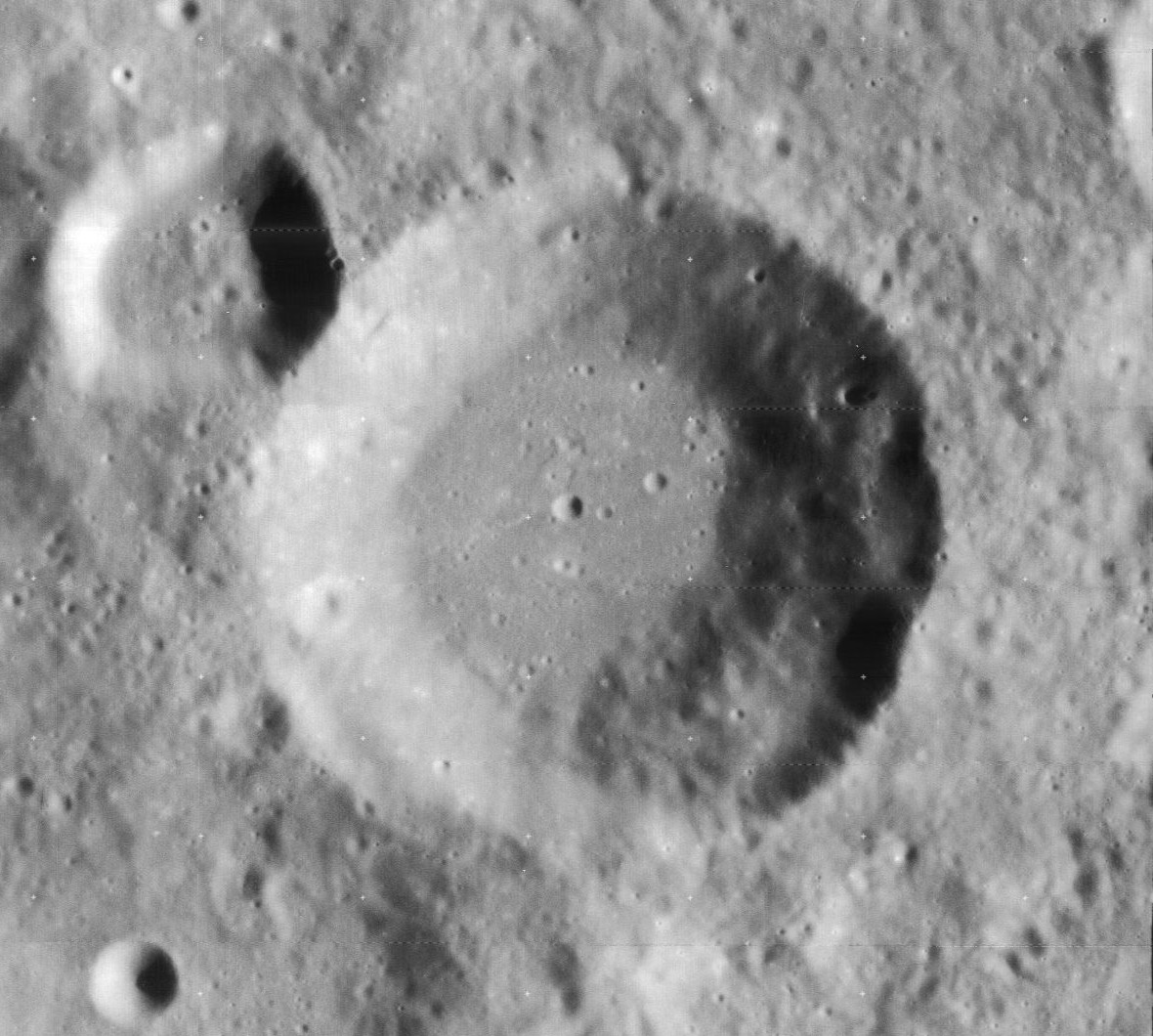
Lunar Orbiter 4 image

Geber is a lunar impact crater that is located in the rugged south-central highlands of the Moon. It lies halfway between the crater Almanon to the north-northeast and the crater pair of Azophi and Abenezra to the south-southwest. Farther to the southeast is Sacrobosco. Geber is 45 kilometers in diameter and 3,510 meters deep.

The rim of Geber is symmetrical and nearly circular, with only minor indentations at the north and south faces of its high, terraced wall. The floor is flat and lacks a significant central peak at the midpoint. The small satellite crater Geber B is attached to the northwest rim. Geber is from the Nectarian period.

In 1935, the crater was officially named after Jabir ibn Aflah (Latinized as Geber), a Spanish-Arab astronomer active in the first half of the twelfth century.

== Satellite craters ==
By convention these features are identified on lunar maps by placing the letter on the side of the crater midpoint that is closest to Geber.

| Geber | Latitude | Longitude | Diameter |
|---|---|---|---|
| A | 21.8° S | 14.7° E | 14 km |
| B | 19.0° S | 13.0° E | 19 km |
| C | 22.1° S | 14.9° E | 11 km |
| D | 19.3° S | 11.9° E | 5 km |
| E | 20.5° S | 12.9° E | 6 km |
| F | 19.9° S | 13.2° E | 5 km |
| H | 17.9° S | 12.5° E | 4 km |
| J | 20.0° S | 15.9° E | 4 km |
| K | 17.5° S | 10.6° E | 5 km |
