= Pons (crater) =

Crater on the Moon

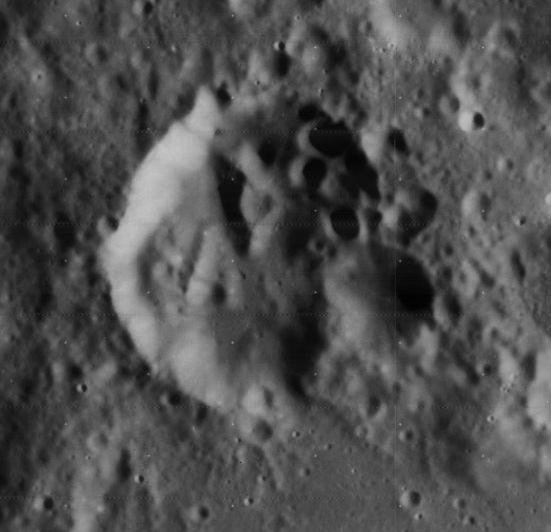
- Lunar Orbiter 4 image
- Coordinates: 25.3°S 21.5°E
- Diameter: 44 × 31 km
- Depth: 2.3 km
- Colongitude: 339° at sunrise
- Eponym: Jean-Louis Pons

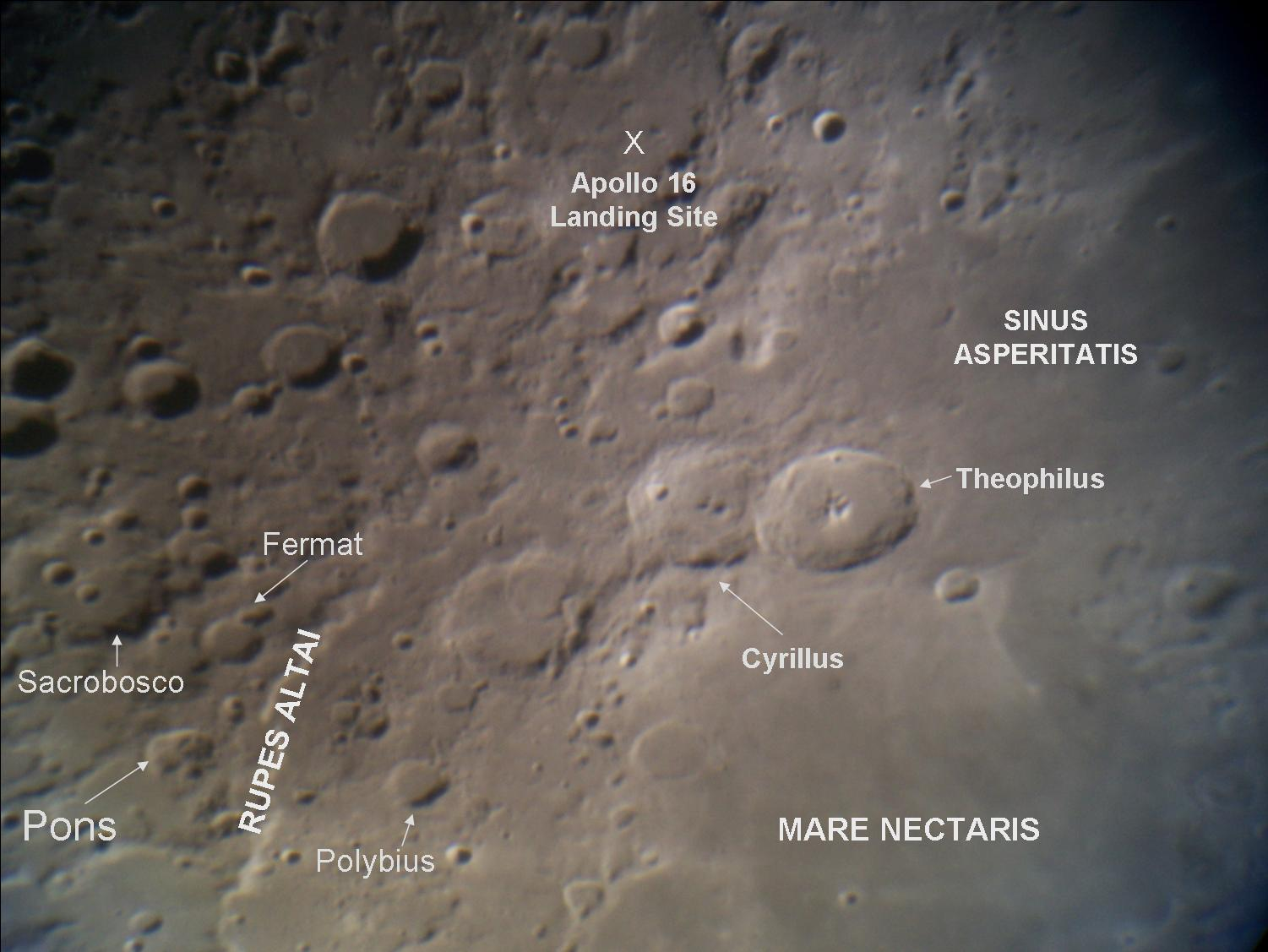
Location of Pons (lower left)

Pons is a lunar impact crater that is located to the west of the prominent Rupes Altai scarp. It was named after French astronomer Jean-Louis Pons. It lies to the southeast of the crater Sacrobosco, and southwest of Polybius. To the northwest along the same flank of the formation is the crater Fermat.

The rim of Pons has an elongated shape, extending further along a northeast-southwest axis than in the perpendicular direction. The outer wall is irregular and notched, especially at the northeastern end, where it is partially overlain by the satellite crater Pons D and several smaller formations. The interior is uneven, with low ridges projecting from the north and southeastern rims. British astronomer T. W. Webb noted "very dark spots in the ring".

== Satellite craters ==
By convention these features are identified on lunar maps by placing the letter on the side of the crater midpoint that is closest to Pons.

Pons	Latitude	Longitude	Diameter
A	27.3° S	20.0° E	12 km
B	28.7° S	20.7° E	13 km
C	27.9° S	22.3° E	18 km
D	25.5° S	22.1° E	15 km
E	25.8° S	23.8° E	18 km
F	23.7° S	21.2° E	12 km
G	28.3° S	21.4° E	6 km
H	26.9° S	22.3° E	10 km
J	24.9° S	22.2° E	5 km
K	27.4° S	22.8° E	7 km
L	27.5° S	20.9° E	8 km
M	27.1° S	24.1° E	11 km
N	26.0° N	23.0° E	6 km
P	25.0° N	23.1° E	5 km
