= Goodacre (crater) =

Crater on the Moon

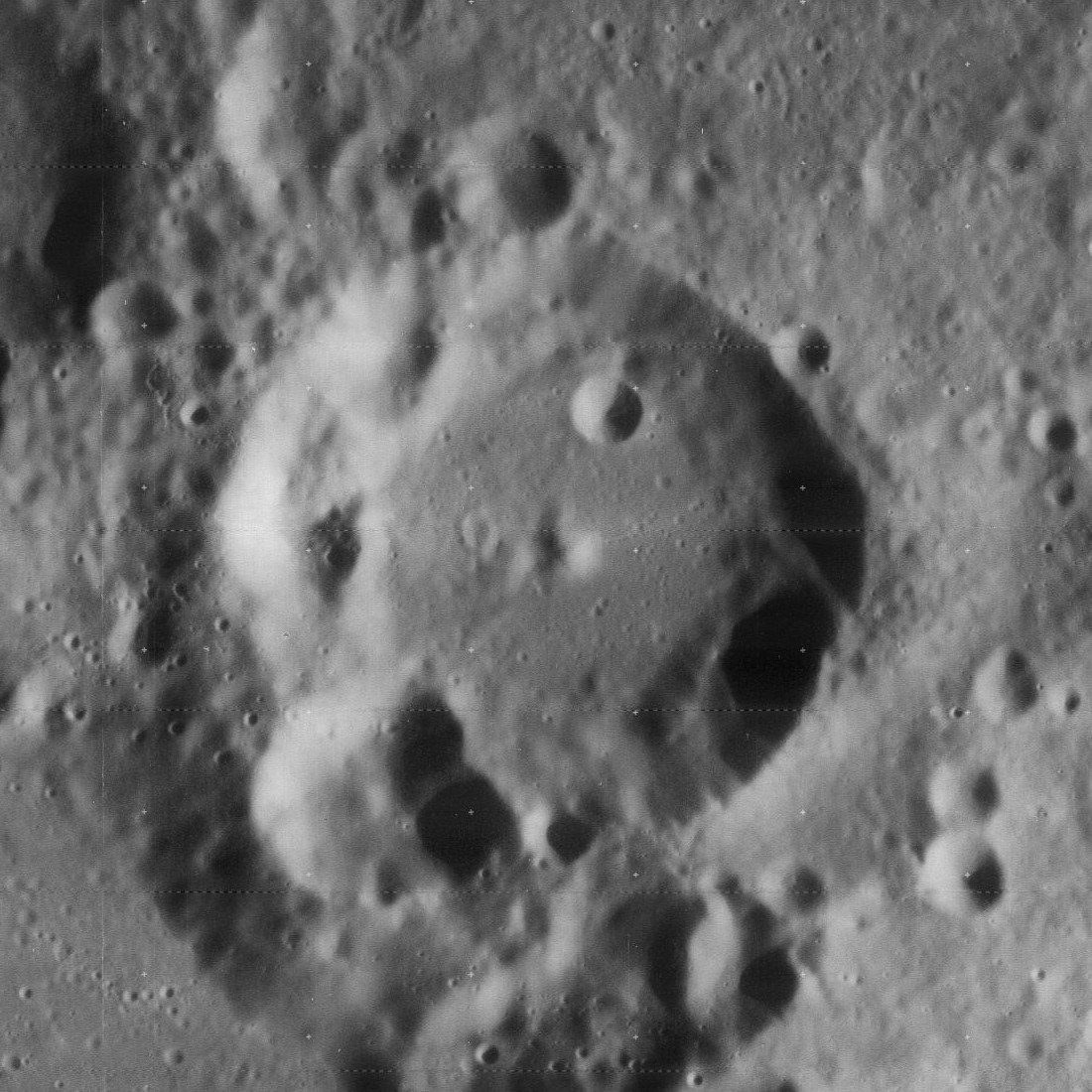
- Lunar Orbiter 4 image
- Coordinates: 32.7°S 14.1°E
- Diameter: 46 km
- Depth: 3.2 km
- Colongitude: 346° at sunrise
- Eponym: Walter Goodacre

Goodacre is a lunar impact crater. It is located in the rugged southern highlands on the Moon's near side, and is attached to the north-northeastern part of the exterior of Gemma Frisius, a heavily worn and much larger formation. About two crater diameters to the north of Goodacre lies Pontanus.

The crater is named after British selenographer Walter Goodacre.

The outer rim of this crater formation has become eroded by smaller impacts, and is heavily damaged along the southern side. The somewhat distorted satellite crater Goodacre G lies across the co-joined rims of Goodacre and Gemma Frisius. The interior floor has a small central rise and there is a small crater near the northern inner wall. A trace of ray material from Tycho lies along the southwest rim and forms a wispy line that crosses the central peak.

== Satellite craters ==
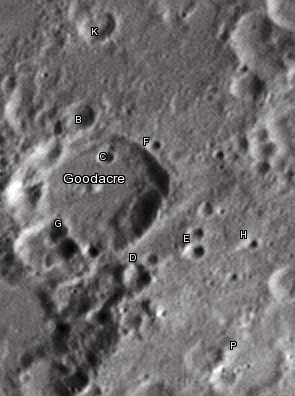
Goodacre crater and its satellite craters taken from Earth in 2012 at the University of Hertfordshire's Bayfordbury Observatory with the telescopes Meade LX200 14" and Lumenera Skynyx 2-1

By convention these features are identified on lunar maps by placing the letter on the side of the crater midpoint that is closest to Goodacre.

Goodacre	Latitude	Longitude	Diameter
B	31.8° S	13.7° E	9 km
C	32.3° S	14.2° E	5 km
D	33.4° S	15.0° E	8 km
E	32.9° S	15.5° E	6 km
F	31.9° S	14.6° E	5 km
G	33.3° S	13.9° E	16 km
H	32.8° S	16.1° E	4 km
K	30.9° S	13.5° E	11 km
P	34.0° S	16.7° E	22 km
