= Playfair (lunar crater) =

Crater on the Moon

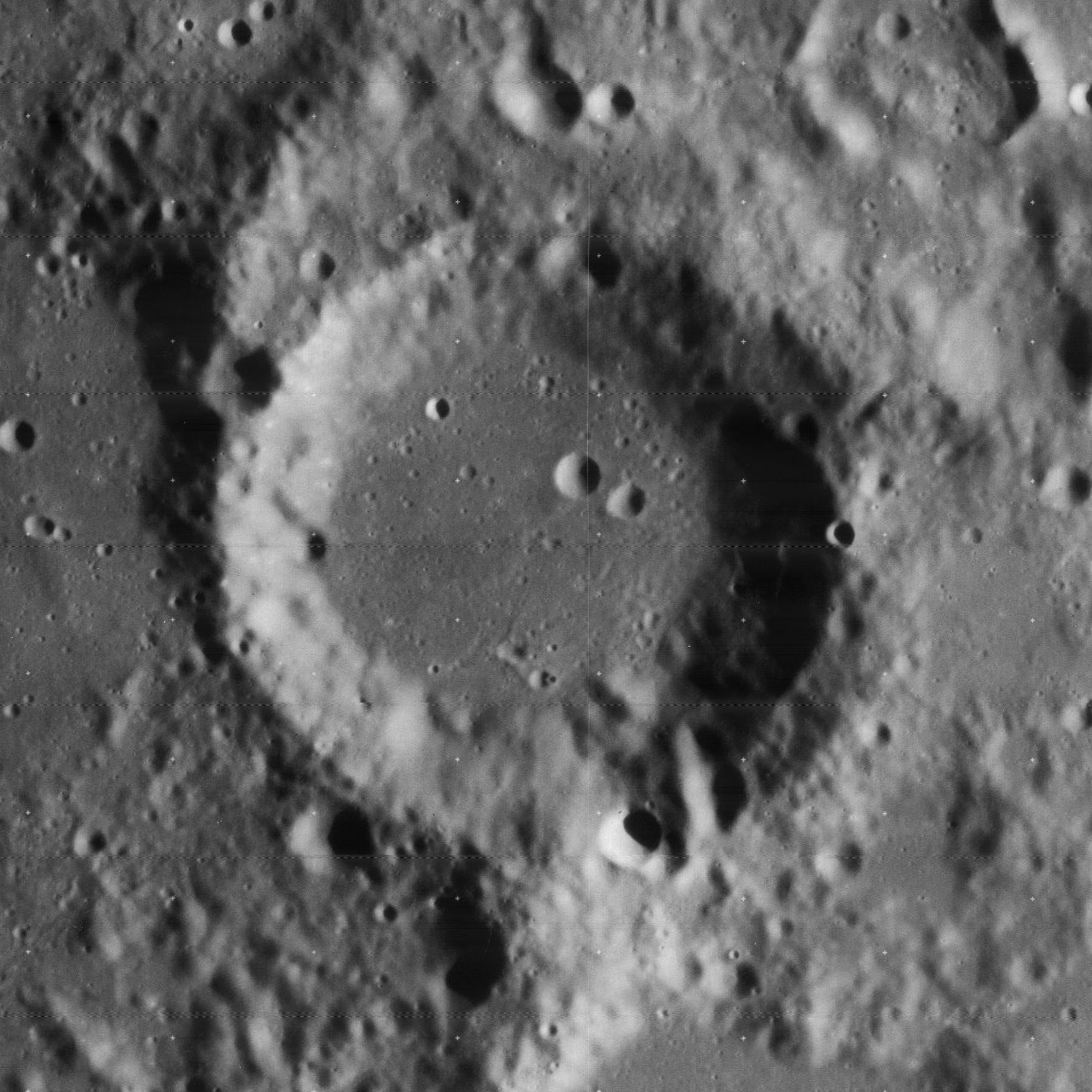
- Lunar Orbiter 4 image
- Coordinates: 23.5°N 8.4°E
- Diameter: 47 km
- Depth: 2.9 km
- Colongitude: 302° at sunrise
- Formation: Nectarian
- Eponym: John Playfair

Playfair is a lunar impact crater that is located in the rugged southern highlands on the near side of the Moon. It was named after the Scottish geologist and mathematician John Playfair. It lies along the eastern rim of the eroded satellite crater Playfair G, a formation that is almost twice the diameter of Playfair itself. Playfair is nearly due north of the crater Apianus, and to the southwest of the Abenezra–Azophi crater pair.

This crater is oval in shape, being slightly wider along the east–west axis. The rim is somewhat eroded, and tiny craterlets lie along the south and west rims. The interior floor is level and nearly featureless, with the only feature of the minor interest being a pair of tiny craterlets lying just to the east of the midpoint.

Playfair is a crater of Nectarian age.

== Satellite craters ==
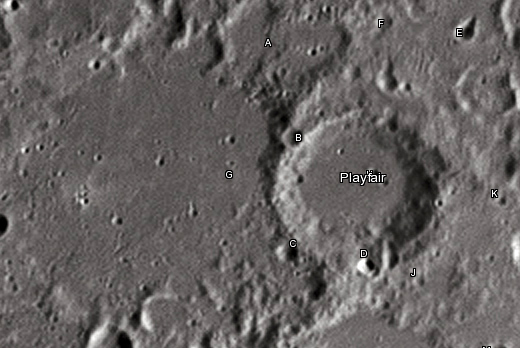
Satellite craters, including the large Playfair G to the west of Playfair itself

By convention these features are identified on lunar maps by placing the letter on the side of the crater midpoint that is closest to Playfair.

Playfair	Latitude	Longitude	Diameter
A	22.3° S	6.9° E	21 km
B	23.2° S	7.6° E	6 km
C	24.3° S	8.0° E	5 km
D	24.3° S	8.8° E	5 km
E	21.7° S	8.9° E	6 km
F	21.9° S	8.1° E	5 km
G	24.2° S	6.7° E	94 km
H	23.3° S	8.5° E	4 km
J	24.3° S	9.3° E	4 km
K	23.3° S	9.8° E	4 km
