= The Book of Fixed Stars =

964 astronomical text by Abd-al-Rahman Al Sufi

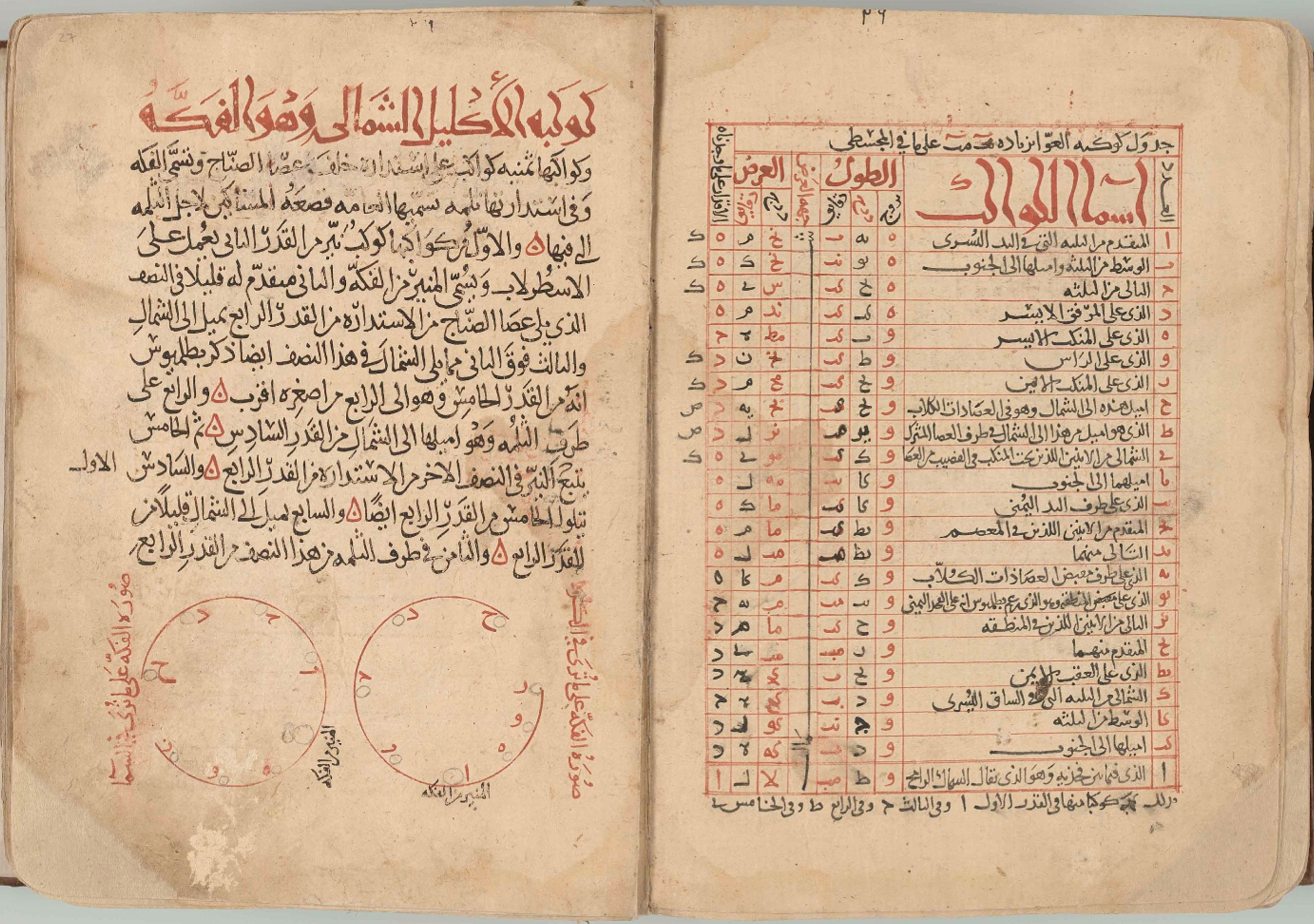
- Two pages from an Iraqi 12th-century manuscript of the Book of Fixed Stars in the Museum of Islamic Art, Doha
- Author: Abd al-Rahman al-Sufi
- Original title: صور الكواكب الثمانية والأربعين
- Language: Arabic
- Subject: Astronomy
- Genre: Non-fiction
- Publisher: Various (modern editions)
- Publication date: 964
- Publication place: Abbasid Caliphate
- Media type: Manuscript, Print

The Book of Fixed Stars (Arabic: كتاب صور الكواكب kitāb suwar al-kawākib, literally The Book of the Shapes of Stars) is an astronomical text written by Abd al-Rahman al-Sufi (Azophi) around 964. Following the Graeco-Arabic translation movement in the 9th century AD, the book was written in Arabic, the common language of scholars across the vast Islamic territories, although the author himself was Persian. It was an attempt to create a synthesis of the comprehensive star catalogue in Ptolemy's Almagest (Books VII and VIII) with indigenous Arabic astronomical traditions on the constellations (notably the Arabic constellation system of the Anwā'). The original manuscript no longer survives as an autograph; however, the importance of tradition and the practice of diligence, central to Islamic manuscript culture, have ensured the survival of the Book of Fixed Stars in later copies.

== Historical context ==
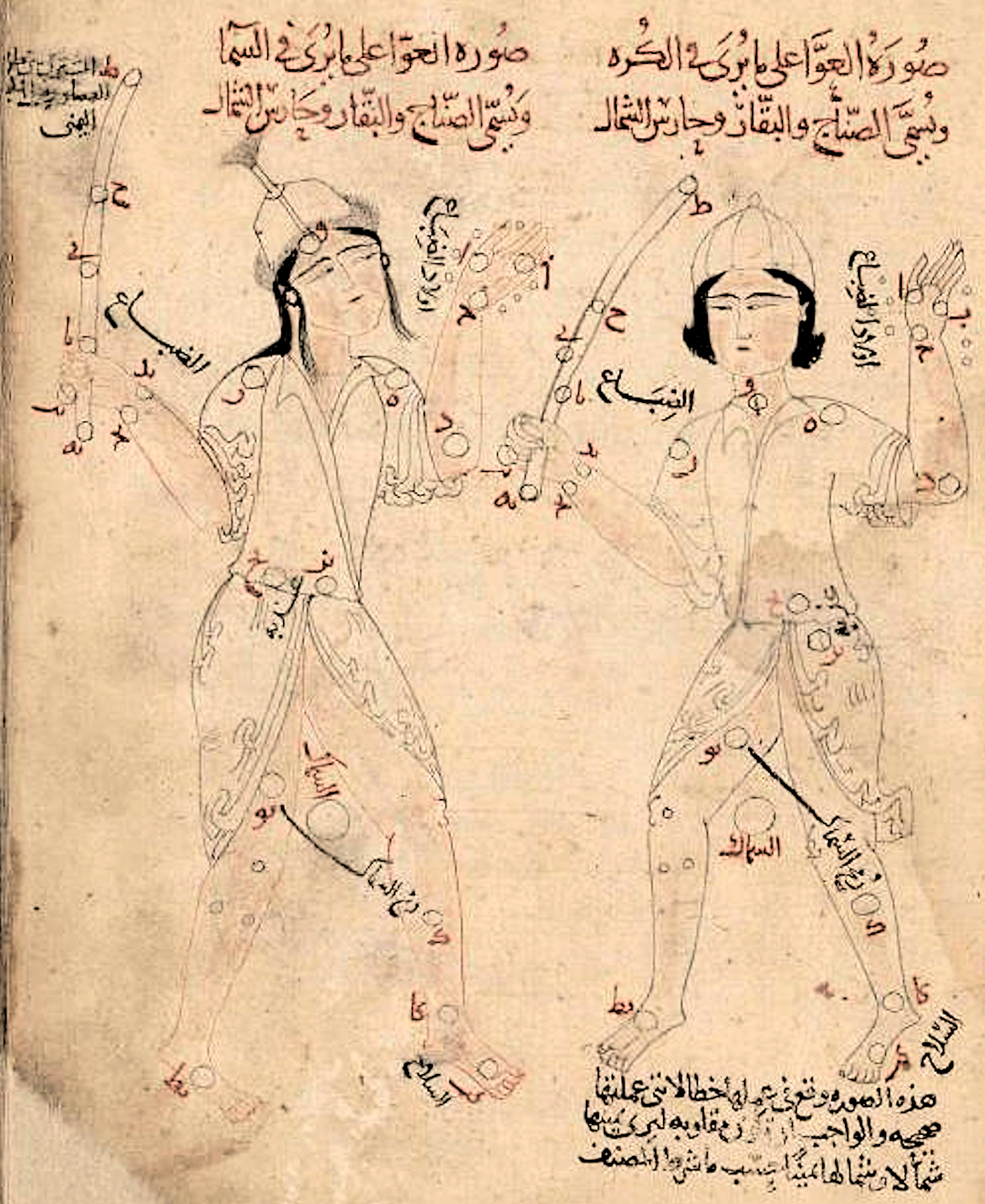
Book of Fixed Stars (Kitāb suwar al-kawākib al-ṯābita), by ‛Abd al-Rahman ibn ‛Umar al-Ṣūfī, dated 1125 CE, Baghdad (controlled by the Seljuks from 1055 to 1135). Doha Museum of Islamic Art MS 2.1998. Now thought to be the oldest surviving copy.

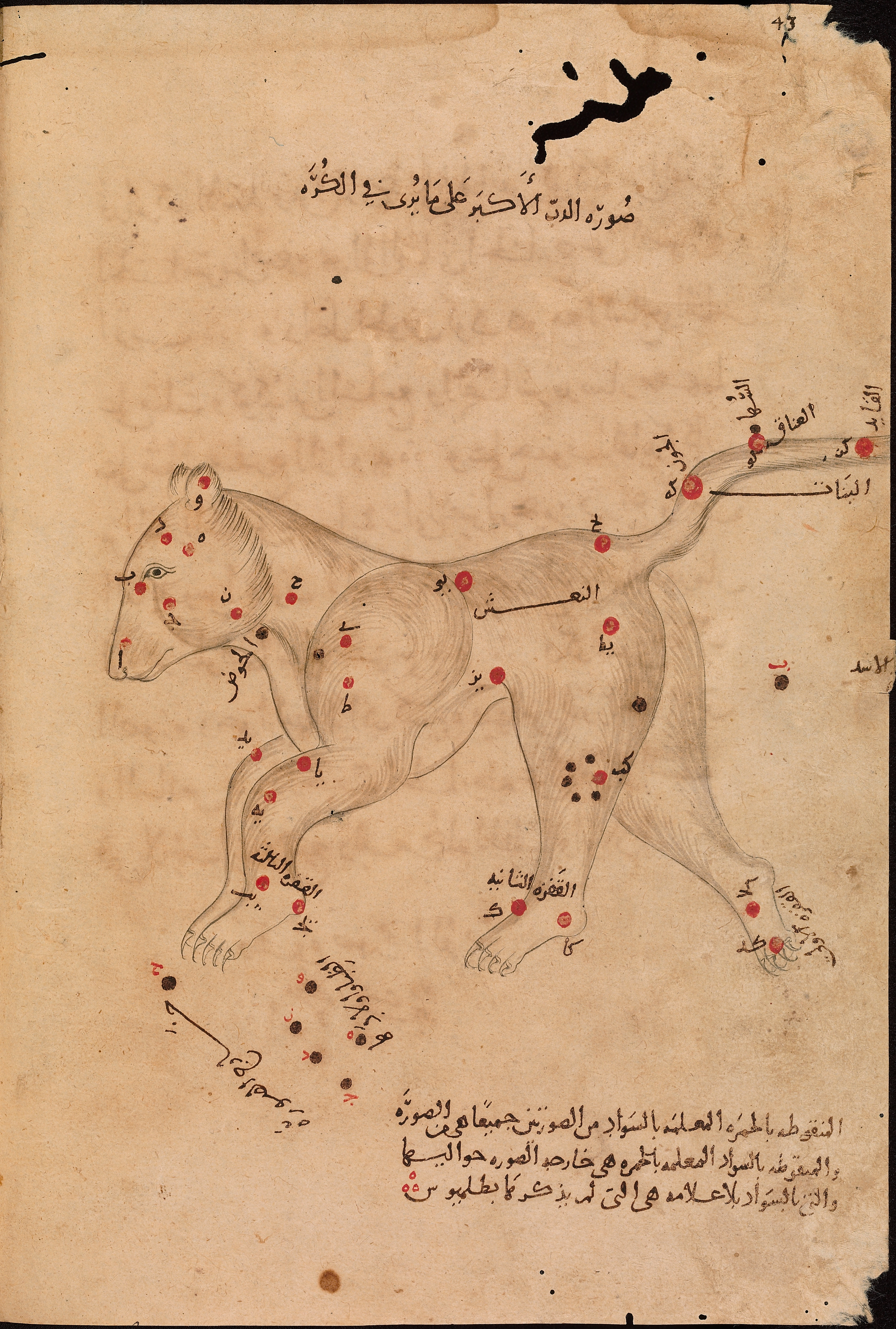
The Great Bear. The familiar seven stars of the "Big Dipper", recorded by Ptolemy, are visible in the rump and tail, but notice they occur as a mirror-image of what we actually see because Al Sufi provided two images of each constellation, one as we see it in the night sky and one as seen here on a celestial globe. The image is from the copy in the Bodleian Library, end of 12th century CE. (Bodleian Library MS. Marsh 144).

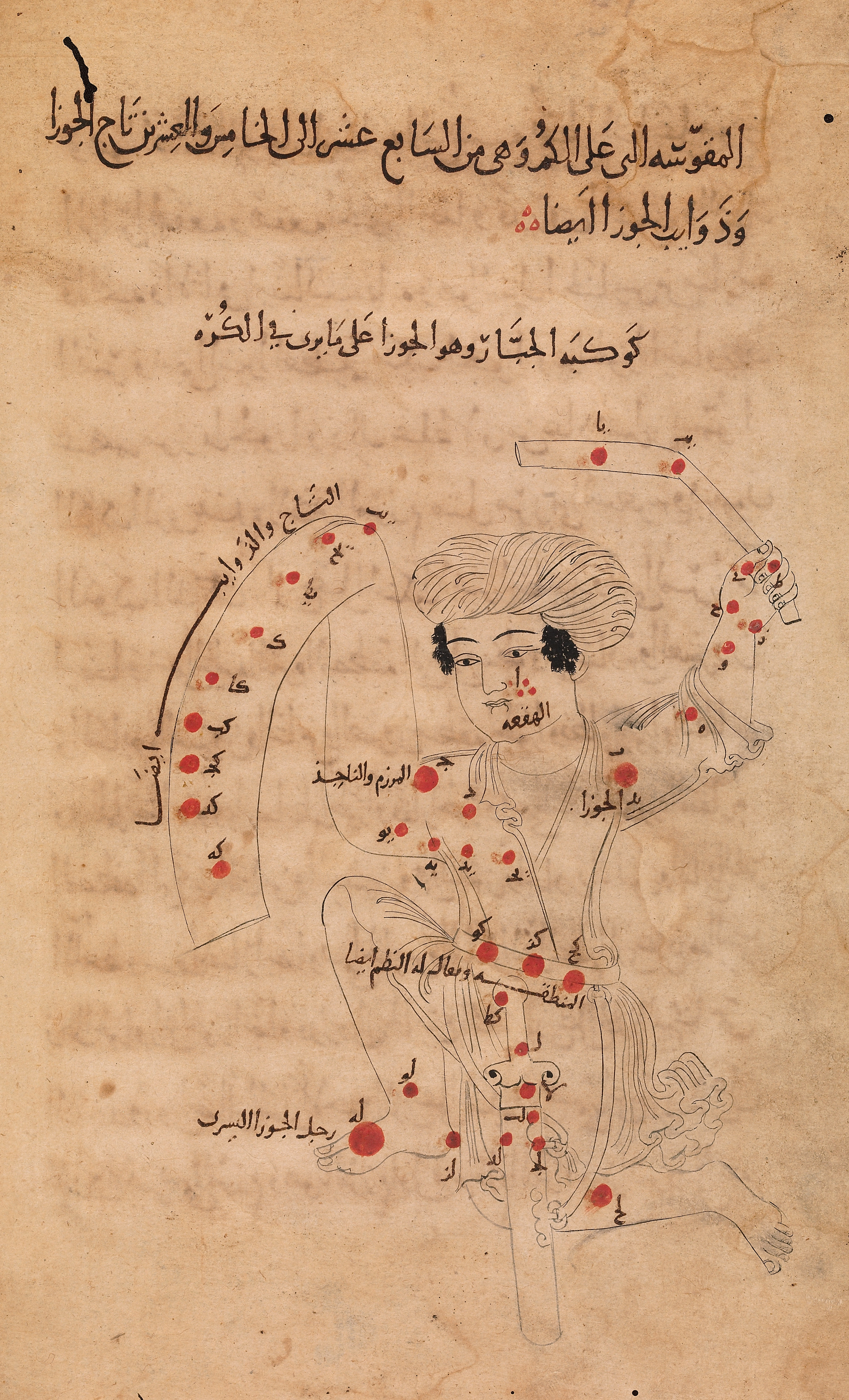
Orion, also as a mirror image. Copy from the Bodleian Library, end of 12th century CE. (Bodleian Library MS. Marsh 144).

The treatise was written in the Persian city of Shiraz, for the patron and Buyid emir 'Adud al-Dawla. Although al-Sufi made his longitudinal calculations correct for the year 964 only, the work remained highly influential, functioning as the standard text on Arabic astronomy to be consulted in all Islamic territories and faithfully copied for many centuries after its production. Since it was only correct for the single year of 964, the Book of Fixed Stars was intended to serve a broader educational purpose, rather than being concerned with the mathematical technicalities of astronomy.

The Book of Fixed Stars is representative of the concerns of Islamic scholars during the late-9th to 11th centuries, where following the translation of Hellenistic texts from Greek to Arabic, "Islamic astronomers and astrologers concentrated on analyzing, criticizing, and perfecting the geometrical models of Ptolemy". Medieval Islamic astronomers also drew from Sanskrit and Middle Persian sources to learn "methods for calculating the position of heavenly bodies, and for creating tables recording the movement of the sun, the moon, and the five known planets." In the context of this shift to observational and theoretical astronomy set in motion by the translation movement, and with al-Sufi himself being an observational astronomer, the Book of Fixed Stars comprises an important organisation and revision of classical knowledge from antiquity (the first of its kind), and some of the earliest surviving examples of visual documentation of celestial bodies observable by the naked eye.

The interest in cataloging the stars also stems from the nature of worship in Islam. The religion requires that its members are able to locate Mecca so that they may pray in the right direction, and to also be able to determine the correct times for prayer. In addition to the daily requirements, during the festival of Ramadan they must also know the moments of sunrise and sunset for fasting, and the location of the moon for the start of each month.

The Book of Fixed Stars also follows a trend of increased production of illustrated manuscripts, as it is one of the oldest surviving treatises of its kind. This is not to say that this text was the first illustrated manuscript ever created, as there are many illustrated fragments that have been found and studied, most notably the Fustat fragments. The Fustat fragments are illustrated scraps of parchment that were found during excavations in Fustat, or Old Cairo. These fragments can be stylistically attributed to the Fatimid period (969-1171), therefore dating the existence of astronomical illustrations to many years before the creation of the Book of Fixed Stars.

The increase in illustrated manuscripts is also related to the advent of paper in the Islamic world in the tenth century. The increased availability of paper, which was much cheaper than parchment, drove the production of books in the Islamic world.

== Contents ==
The book was thoroughly illustrated along with observations and descriptions of the stars, their positions (copied from Ptolemy's Almagest with the longitudes increased by 12° 42' to account for the precession), their magnitudes (brightness) and their color. Notably, al-Sufi improved upon Ptolemy's system for measuring star brightness. Instead of two brightness categories ('more bright' and 'less bright'), al-Sufi employed three: AṢghareh ('less'), Akbareh ('greater'), and A'ẓameh ('much-greater'). Ihsan Hafez has recorded 132 stars in al-Sufi's work not mentioned by Ptolemy.

Al-Sufi's results, as in Ptolemy's Almagest, were set out constellation by constellation. For each constellation, he provided two drawings, one from the outside of a celestial globe, and the other from the inside. Al-Sufi's reasoning for this was that 'the beholder might be confused if he saw the figure on the globe differing from what he sees in the sky', demonstrating the book's use as a teaching device. Persis Berkelamp argues that each paired constellation was drawn slightly differently to encourage students to study the manuscript closely.

A list of constellations featured:
Northern constellations	Zodiac	Southern Constellations
Ursa Minor	Aries	Cetus
Ursa Major	Taurus	Orion
Draco	Gemini	Eridanus
Cepheus	Cancer	Lepus
Boötes	Leo	Canis Major
Corona Borealis	Virgo	Canis Minor
Hercules	Libra	Argo Navis
Lyra	Scorpius	Hydra
Cygnus	Sagittarius	Crater
Cassiopeia	Capricorn	Corvus
Perseus	Aquarius	Centaurus
Auriga	Pisces	Lupus
Ophiuchus and Serpens		Ara
Sagitta		Corona Australis
Aquila		Piscis Austrinus
Delphinus		
Pegasus
Equuleus
Andromeda
Triangulum

== Composition ==
=== Introduction ===
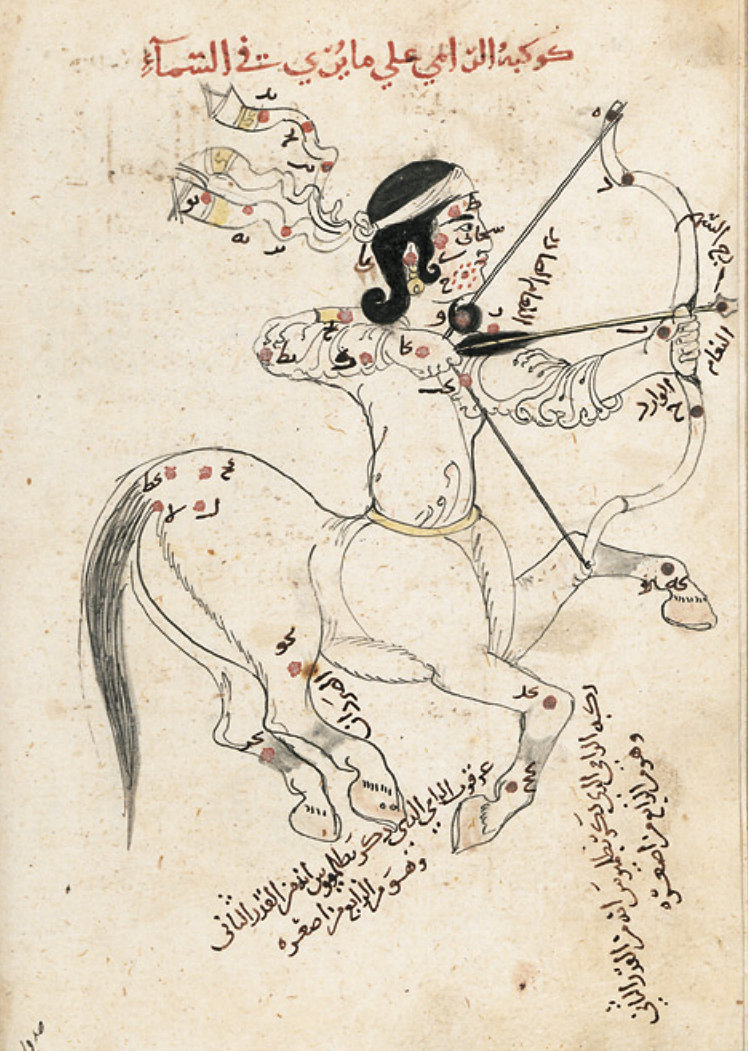
"Sign of Sagittarius" by al-Sufi in The Book of Fixed Stars, Artuqid Mardin, 1131 CE (TSMK, A. 3493)

In his introduction, al-Sufi dedicates the work to his patron 'Adud al-Dawla and outlines the sources he has used to write the book. These sources, including a number of treatises and objects which are now lost, serve as important indicators and records of the knowledge ('ilm) production at the time. For instance, the introduction lists the names of 3 authors (Ibn Kunasa, Ibn al-'Arabi, Abu Hanifa al-Dinawari) and their treatises concerning pre-Islamic Bedouin traditions, all of which are now lost.

=== Chapters ===
The Book of Fixed Stars follows the 48 Ptolemaic constellations described in the Almagest, with a chapter dedicated to each individual constellation. Each chapter is split into 4 subsections.

==== Ptolemaic constellations ====
Each chapter begins with a description of the specified constellation and the stars that make up each grouping, thus departing from the Almagest and its concern for describing the iconographical origins of each constellation outline in Greek mythology. Here, al-Sufi is often critical of Ptolemy for seemingly prioritising the constellation outline over the actual stars in a constellation grouping, with some stars being overlooked. In making these revisions, al-Sufi was able to determine the boundaries for each constellation's star grouping.

==== Indigenous Arabic constellations ====
Al-Sufi continues his description of the specified constellation in terms of the Pre-Islamic Bedouin constellations and star groupings, noting their positions and distance to the Ptolemaic constellation stars.

==== Illustrations ====
In this section, al-Sufi presents two different views/illustrations of the specified Ptolemaic constellations: the constellation viewed in the sky from the ground and the constellation as viewed on top of a globe. The latter view can be explained by accounts of al-Sufi's drawing process, whereby the author carefully fitted a thin sheet of paper on top of a celestial globe and then directly copied the constellation outlines and star positions from the engravings. The inclusion of this globe view of each constellation also suggests that the Books of Fixed Stars was intended to be used by owners of celestial globes, and many surviving globes from the 13th and 14th centuries include statements attesting to the treatise as an influential source.

Although al-Sufi names several sources in his introduction which contributed to the book's illustrations, none of these treatises nor celestial globes survive. These illustrations represent another important departure from the Almagest which does not include any illustrations.

==== Star Catalogue ====
The book includes a comprehensive catalogue of the individual stars, modified and extended from that of the Almagest, and including revised star magnitude values.

== Influence ==
The work was highly influential and survives in numerous manuscripts and translations. The oldest manuscript was thought to be MS. Marsh 144 in the Bodleian Library, with a date of 1009 CE, and allegedly the work of the author's son, but this is now disputed, and has been re-dated to the end of the 12th century. Manuscript MS 2.1198 in the Doha Museum is now considered the oldest, dated to 1125 CE.

There is a thirteenth-century copy in the British Library (Or. 5323). It has the earliest known descriptions and illustrations of what he called "a little cloud", which is actually the Andromeda Galaxy. He mentions it as lying before the mouth of a Big Fish, an Arabic constellation. This "cloud" was apparently commonly known to the Isfahan astronomers, very probably before 905, and al-Sufi attributes their discoveries in the text. This was the first galaxy to be observed, as distinct from a star cluster.

It has been claimed that the first recorded mention of the Large Magellanic Cloud was given in the Book of Fixed Stars but this seems to be a misunderstanding of a reference to some stars south of Canopus which he admits he has not seen.

He probably also cataloged the Omicron Velorum star cluster as a "nebulous star", and an additional "nebulous object" in Vulpecula, a cluster now variously known as Al-Sufi's Cluster, the "Coathanger asterism", Brocchi's Cluster or Collinder 399.

The book has been translated into French by Hans Schjellerup in 1874 and partially into English by Ihsan Hafez.

== Editions ==
- Text and French translation of Ṣūfī's introduction by J. J. A. Caussin de Perceval in Notices et extraits des manuscrits XII, Paris, 1831, pp. 236f.
- H.C.F.C. Schjellerup, Description des étoiles fixes par Abd-al-Rahman al-Sûfi, St. Petersburg, 1874. Complete French translation from two late mss., with selected portions in Arabic.
- Ketāb ṣowar al-kawākeb al-ṯābeta, edited from five mss., and accompanied by the Orǰūza of Ebn al-Ṣūfī, Hyderabad, India, 1954 (introduction by H. J. J. Winter).
- Facsimile edition of the Persian translation by Naṣīr-al-dīn Ṭūsī (Ayasofya 2595, autograph, from Uluḡ Beg's library), Tehran, 1348 Š./1969.
- Critical edition of Ṭūsī's translation by Sayyed Moʿezz-al-dīn Mahdavī, Tehran, 1351 Š./1972.
- The star nomenclature of the Castilian version, and of an Italian translation made from Castilian, was critically edited by O. J. Tallgren, "Los nombres árabes de las estrelas y la transcripción alfonsina", in Homenaje a R. Menéndez Pidal II, Madrid, 1925, with 'Correcciones y adiciones' in Revista de filología española 12, 1925, pp. 52f.
- The Italian translation was edited by P. Knecht, I libri astronomici di Alfonso X in una versione fiorentina del trecento, Saragossa, 1965.
- Partial English translation; Hafez, Ihsan (2010) Abd al-Rahman al-Sufi and his book of the fixed stars: a journey of re-discovery. PhD thesis, James Cook University.

== Gallery ==
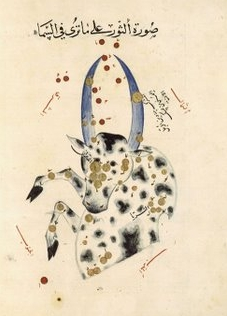
Constellation Taurus

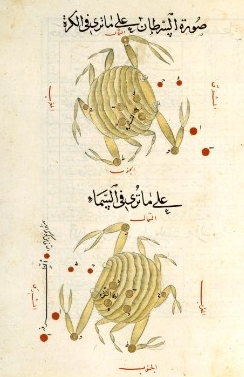
Constellation Cancer

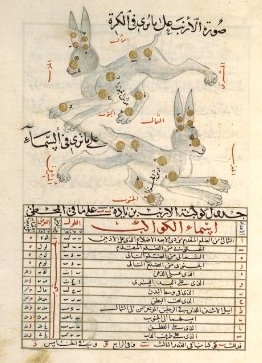
Constellation Lepus

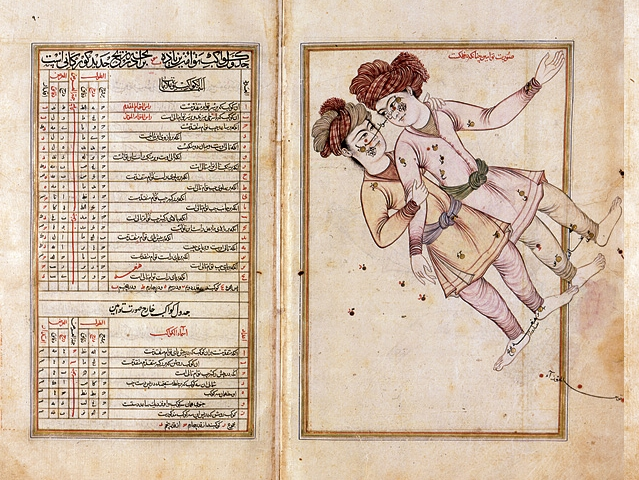
Constellation Gemini

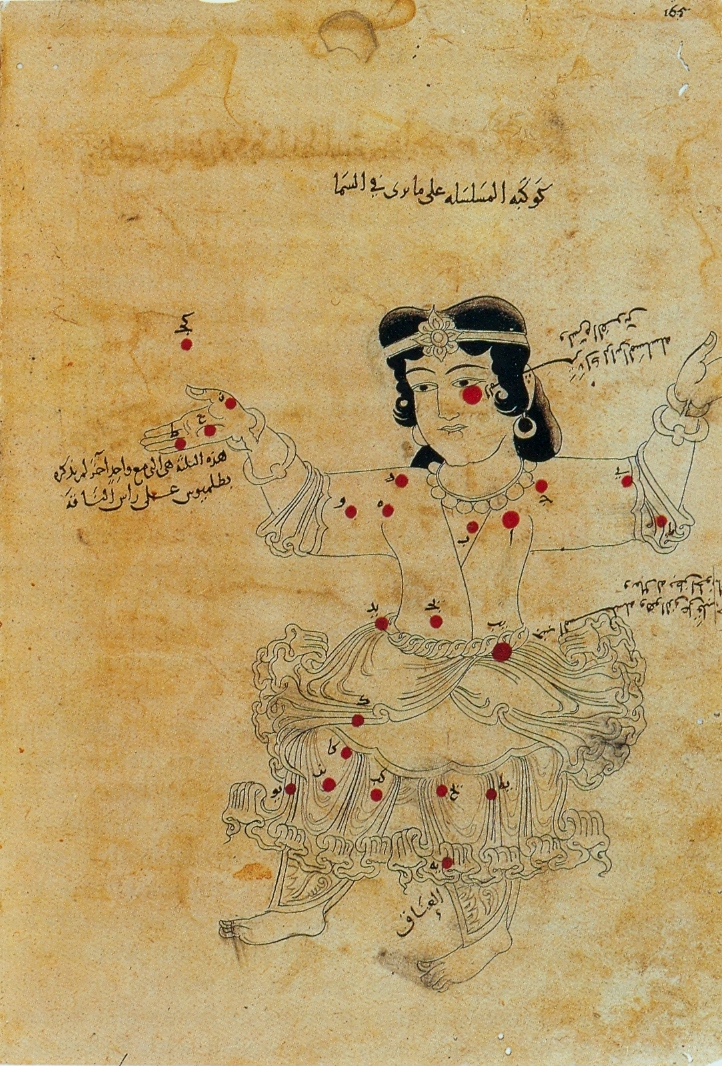
Constellation Andromeda

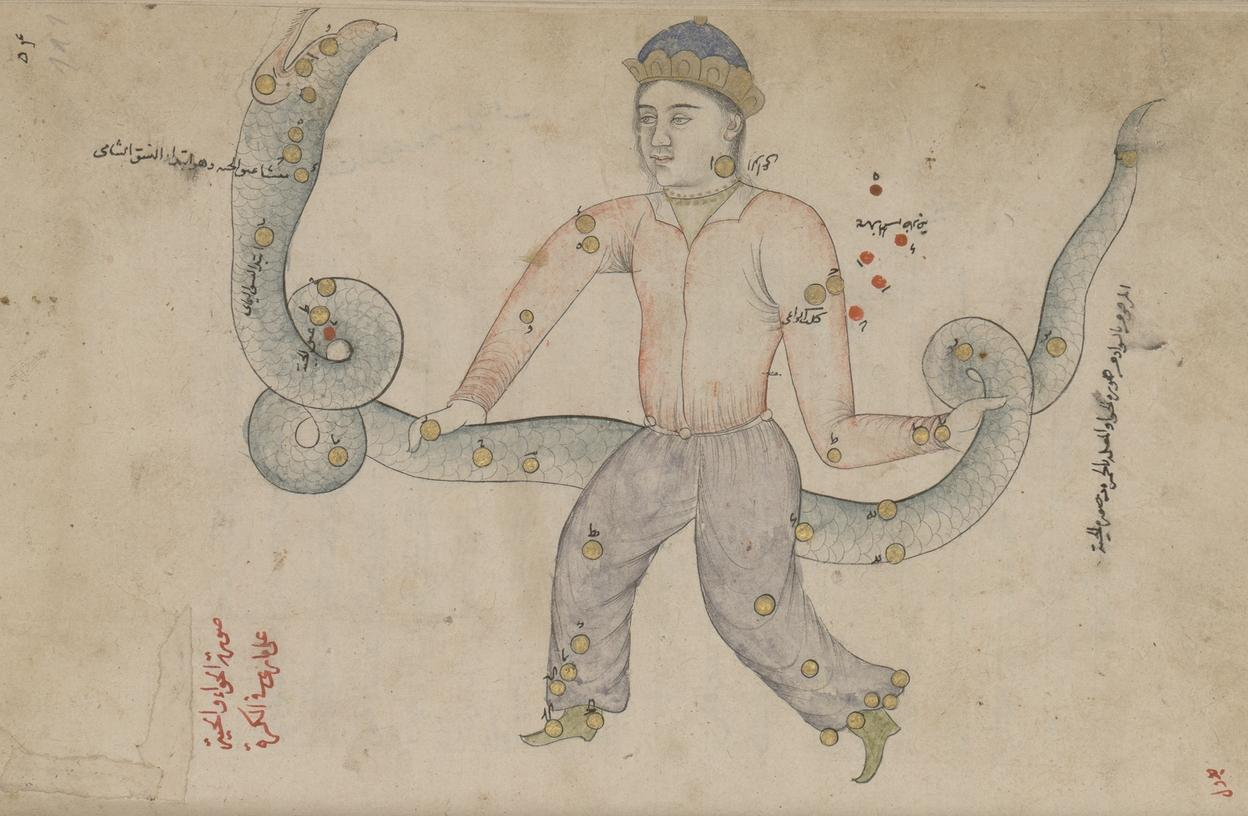
Constellation Ophiuchus

== Sources ==
- Canby, Sheila R.; Beyazit, Deniz; Rugiadi, Martina; Peacock, A. C. S. (27 April 2016). Court and Cosmos: The Great Age of the Seljuqs. Metropolitan Museum of Art. ISBN 978-1-58839-589-4.
- Paul Kunitzsch, The Arabs and the Stars: Texts and Traditions on the Fixed Stars, and Their Influence in Medieval Europe (Variorum Reprint, Cs307)
- Paul Kunitzsch, Arabische Sternnamen in Europa, Wiesbaden, 1959, pp. 230f.
- Paul Kunitzsch, "Ṣūfī Latinus", Zeitschrift der Deutschen Morgenländische Gesellschaft, 115, 1965, pp. 65–74.
- Paul Kunitzsch, "Al-Ṣūfī" in: Dictionary of Scientific Biography, XIII, New York, 1976, pp. 149–50.
- J. Upton, "A Manuscript of "The Book of the Fixed Stars" by ʿAbd ar-Raḥmān aṣ-Ṣūfī", Metropolitan Museum Studies, 4, 1933, pp. 179–97.
- E. Wellesz, An Islamic Book of Constellations, Oxford, 1965.
- H. J. J. Winter, "Notes on al-Kitab Suwar Al-Kawakib", Archives Internationales d'Histoire des Sciences, 8, 1955, pp. 126–33.
