= Abd al-Rahman al-Sufi =

Persian astronomer (903–986)

ʿAbd al-Raḥmān al-Ṣūfī
- عبدالرحمن الصوفي
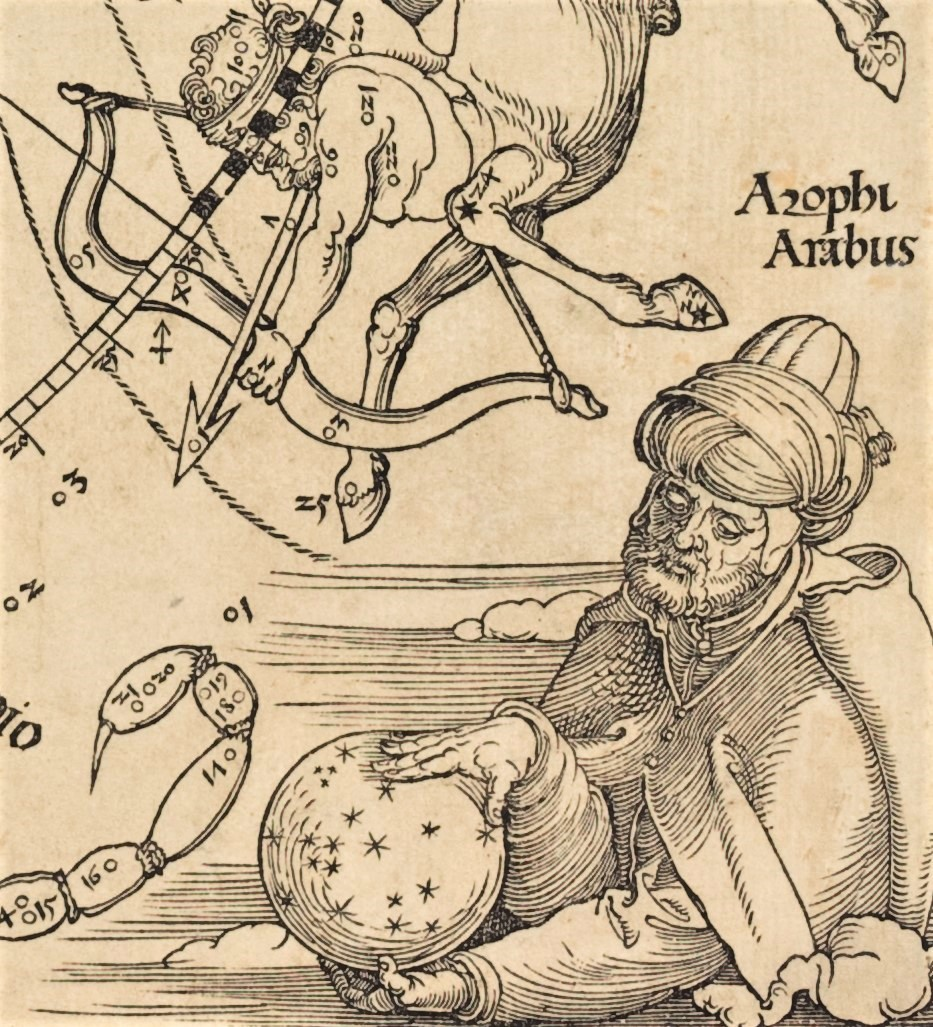
- Al-Ṣūfī, as depicted in Albrecht Dürer's woodcut Imagines coeli septentrionales cum duodecim imaginibus zodiaci [The Northern Celestial Hemisphere with the Twelve Signs of the Zodiac] (1515)
- Born: 7 December 903; Rey, Jibal, Abbasid Caliphate
- Died: 25 May 986 (aged 82)
- Occupations: Astronomer, mathematician
- Era: Islamic Golden Age
- Notable work: Kitāb ṣuwar al-kawākib ("The Book of Fixed Stars")

ʿAbd al-Raḥmān al-Ṣūfī (full name: Abū’l-Ḥusayn ʿAbd al-Raḥmān ibn ʿUmar ibn Sahl al-Ṣūfī al-Rāzī —Arabic: أَبُو الحُسَين عَبدُ اَلرَّحمَن بن عُمَر بن سَهل اَلصُّوفِي اَلرَّازِي; Persian: ابوالحسن عبدالرحمن صوفی رازی — 7 December 903 – 25 May 986) was a Persian astronomer.

His work, Kitāb ṣuwar al-kawākib ("The Book of Fixed Stars"), completed in 964, included both textual descriptions and illustrations. The Persian polymath Al-Biruni noted that al-Ṣūfī's work on the ecliptic was conducted in Shiraz. Al-Ṣūfī lived at the Buyid court in Isfahan.

== Biography ==
ʿAbd al-Raḥmān al-Ṣūfī was one of the nine famous Muslim astronomers. He lived at the court of Emir 'Adud al-Dawla in Isfahan and worked on translating and expanding ancient Greek astronomical works, especially the Almagest of Ptolemy. He made corrections to Ptolemy's star list, and his estimations of star brightness and magnitude deviated from those of Ptolemy; just over half of al-Ṣūfī's magnitudes were identical to Ptolemy's. A Persian, al-Ṣūfī wrote in Arabic, the lingua franca of the scientific Muslim world.

Al-Ṣūfī was a major contributor to the translation into Arabic of Hellenistic astronomy, which had been centered in Alexandria, Egypt. He was among the first to attempt to relate Greek star names with the traditional Arabic names and constellations, which were largely unrelated and overlapped in complex ways.

== Astronomy ==
Al-Ṣūfī made his astronomical observations at a latitude of 32.7° N in Isfahan. It has been claimed that he identified the Large Magellanic Cloud, but this appears to be a misunderstanding of a reference to some stars south of Canopus, which he admits he did not observe. He also made the earliest recorded observation of the Andromeda Galaxy in 964, describing it as a "small cloud". This was the first galaxy other than the Milky Way to be mentioned in writing.

=== Astrolabe ===
Al-Ṣūfī also wrote about the astrolabe, identifying numerous additional uses for it. According to American Near Eastern scholar Adam L. Bean, al-Ṣūfī's work describes over 1,000 different uses in areas as diverse as astronomy, astrology and horoscopes, navigation, surveying, timekeeping, determining the Qibla, and performing Salat prayer.

=== Kitāb ṣuwar al-kawākib ("The Book of Fixed Stars") ===
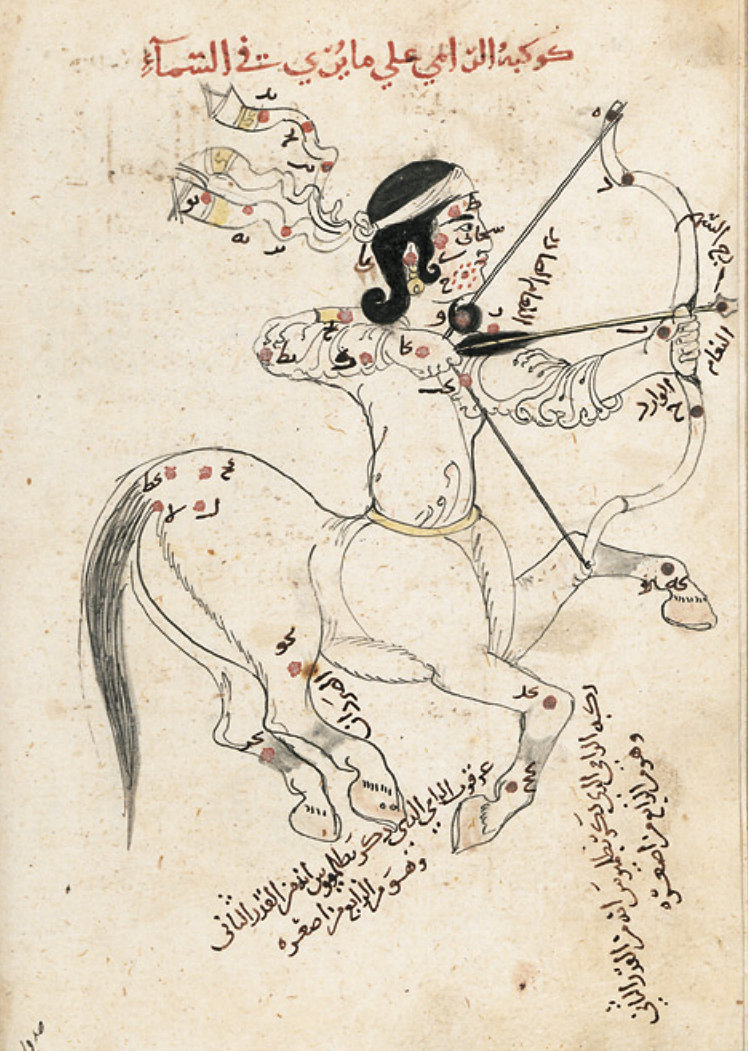
“Sign of Sagittarius” by al-Sufi in his book Ṣuwar al-kawākib al-thābita, Artuqid Mardin, 1131 CE.

Al-Ṣūfī published Kitāb ṣuwar al-kawākib ("The Book of Fixed Stars") in 964, and dedicated it to Adud al-Dawla, the ruler of Buwayhid at the time. This book describes 48 constellations and the stars within them.

Al-Ṣūfī compared Greek constellations and stars as described in Ptolemy’s Almagest with Arabic ones, linking those that were the same. He included two illustrations of each constellation, one showing the orientation of the stars from the perspective outside the celestial globe, and the other from the perspective of looking at the sky while standing on the Earth. He separated them into three groups; 21 seen from the north, 15 seen from the south, and the 12 zodiac constellations. He included a complete set of star charts, that included the names and numbers of the individual stars in each of the 48 constellations, and each star's longitudinal and latitudinal coordinates, magnitude, and location north or south of the ecliptic.

Scribal errors within the 35 surviving copies of The Book of Fixed Stars have caused the value of the magnitude for a particular star to vary from manuscript to manuscript. Al-Ṣūfī organized the stars in each of his drawings into two groups: those that form the image depicted, and others that are in close proximity to the image. He identified and described stars not included by Ptolemy, but he did not include them in his own star charts. Stating that his charts were modelled after Ptolemy, he left the stars excluded in Ptolemy's catalogue out of his charts as well.

To allow for the longitudinal placement of the stars within constellations having changed over the eight centuries since the Almagest was written, Al-Ṣūfī added 12° 42' to all the longitudes values provided by Ptolemy. Al-Ṣūfī differed from Ptolemy by having a three level scale to measure the magnitude of stars instead of a two level scale. This extra level increased the precision of his measurements. His methodology for determining these magnitude measurements cannot be found in any of his extant texts.

Despite the importance of The Book of Fixed Stars in the history of astronomy, it took more than 1000 years until the first partial English translation of the book was published in 2010.

== Legacy ==
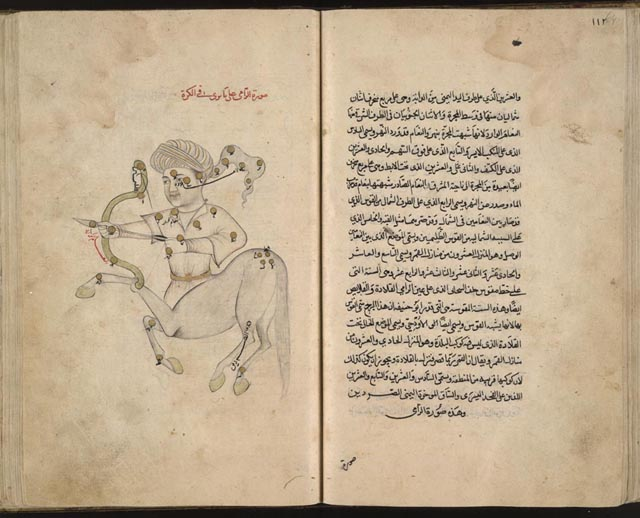
Sagittarius from The Depiction of Celestial Constellations

Al-Ṣūfī's astronomical work was subsequently used by many other astronomers, including Ulugh Beg who was both a prince and astronomer.

The lunar crater Azophi and the minor planet 12621 Alsufi are named after Al-Ṣūfī.

The Astronomy Society of Iran – Amateur Committee has held international Sufi Observing Competitions in memory of the astronomer. The first competition was held in 2006 in the north of Semnan Province, and the second was held in the summer of 2008 in Ladiz near the Zahedan. More than 100 attendees from Iran and Iraq participated in these events.

Google Doodle commemorated Al-Ṣūfī's 1113th birthday on 7 December 2016.

== See also ==
- List of pre-modern Iranian scientists and scholars
- List of scientists in medieval Islamic world

== Bibliography ==
- Al-Qifti. Ikhbār al-ʿulamāʾ bi-akhbār al-ḥukamāʾ (History of Learned Men). In: ʿAbd al-Raḥmān al-Şūfī and his Book of the Fixed Stars: A Journey of Re-discovery by Ihsan Hafez, Richard F. Stephenson, Wayne Orchiston (2011). In: Orchiston, Wayne, Highlighting the history of astronomy in the Asia-Pacific region: proceedings of the ICOA-6 conference. Astrophysics and Space Science Proceedings. New York: Springer. ISBN 978-1-4419-8161-5. "... is the honored, the perfect, the most intelligent and the friend of the King Adud al-Dawla Fanakhasru Shahenshah Ibn Buwaih. He is the author of the most honored books in the science of astronomy. He was originally from Nisa and is of a Persian descent."
- Cavin, Jerry D. (2011). The Amateur Astronomer's Guide to the Deep-Sky Catalogs. Springer Nature. ISBN 978-1-4614-0656-3.
- Hafez, Ihsan; Stephenson, Richard; Orchiston, Wayne (2011). "Abd al-Rahman al-Sufi and his Book of the Fixed Stars". In Orchiston, Wayne; Nakamura, Tsuko; Strom, Richard G. (eds.). Highlighting the History of Astronomy in the Asia-Pacific Region. Springer Nature. pp. 121–138. ISBN 978-14419-8-161-5.
- Kepple, George Robert; Sanner, Glen W. (1998). The Night Sky Observer's Guide. Vol. 1. Willmann-Bell. ISBN 0-943396-58-1.
- Knobel, E. B. (1885). "On Al Sufi's star magnitudes". Monthly Notices of the Royal Astronomical Society. 45 (8). Royal Astronomical Society: 417–425. Bibcode:1885MNRAS..45..417K. doi:10.1093/mnras/45.8.417.
- Kunitzsch, P. (1988). "ʿAbd-al-Raḥmān b. ʿOmar Ṣūfī". Encyclopædia Iranica.
- Orchiston, Wayne; Green, David A.; Strom, Richard, eds. (2014). New Insights From Recent Studies in Historical Astronomy: Following in the Footsteps of F. Richard Stephenson: A Meeting to Honor F. Richard Stephenson on His 70th Birthday. Springer Nature. ISBN 978-3-319-07614-0.
- Ridpath, Ian. "Star Tales: al-Şūfī's nebulae".
- Russell, G.A., ed. (1994). The 'Arabik' Interest of the Natural Philosophers in Seventeenth Century England. Brill's Studies in Intellectual History. Leiden; New York; Cologne: E.J. Brill. ISBN 9004098887.
- Schaefer, Bradley E. (2013). "The Thousand Star Magnitudes in the Catalogues of Ptolemy, Al Sufi, and Tycho are All Corrected for Atmospheric Extinction". Journal for the History of Astronomy. 44 (1): 47–A91. arXiv:1303.1833. Bibcode:2013JHA....44...47S. doi:10.1177/002182861304400103. ISSN 0021-8286. S2CID 119202231.
- Selin, Helaine (1997). Encyclopaedia of the History of Science, Technology, and Medicine in Non-Western Cultures. Berlin; New York: Springer Nature. ISBN 978-1-4020-4960-6.
- Upton, Joseph M. (1933). "A Manuscript of "The Book of the Fixed Stars" by ʿAbd Ar-Raḥmān Aṣ-Ṣūfī". Metropolitan Museum Studies. 4 (2): 179–197. doi:10.2307/1522800. JSTOR 1522800.
