= Fermat (crater) =

Crater on the Moon

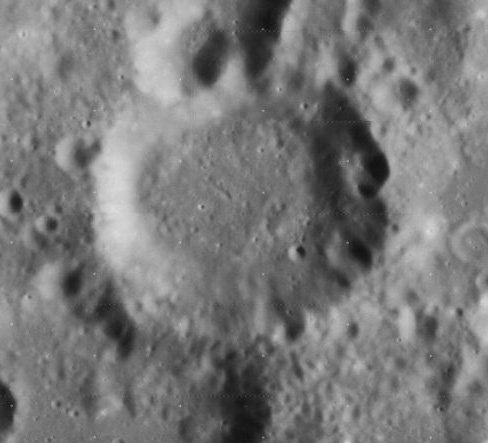
- Lunar Orbiter 4 image
- Coordinates: 22.71°S 19.79°E
- Diameter: 37.77 km (23.47 mi)
- Depth: 2.58 km (1.60 mi)
- Colongitude: 20° at sunrise
- Eponym: Pierre de Fermat

Fermat is a lunar impact crater located to the west of the Rupes Altai escarpment. To the west-southwest is the larger crater Sacrobosco, and to the southwest is the irregular Pons. It is 38 kilometers in diameter and 2.6 kilometers deep.

The rim of Fermat is worn and somewhat irregular, but still possesses an outer rampart. The north rim is indented by a double crater formation that includes Fermat A. The floor is relatively flat and does not have a central rise. The crater is from the Pre-Imbrian period, 4.55 to 3.85 billion years ago.

This formation is named for 17th century French mathematician Pierre de Fermat (1601-1665). His name was incorporated in the lunar nomenclature of German astronomer Johann H. Mädler during the 19th century. Its designation was officially adopted by the International Astronomical Union in 1935.

== Satellite craters ==
By convention these features are identified on lunar maps by placing the letter on the side of the crater midpoint that is closest to Fermat.

Fermat	Coordinates	Diameter
A	21.8°S 19.6°E	17 km
B	23.0°S 21.1°E	11 km
C	21.0°S 18.5°E	14 km
D	20.1°S 18.0°E	13 km
E	19.9°S 19.9°E	7 km
F	22.1°S 20.2°E	5 km
G	19.4°S 20.0°E	7 km
H	23.1°S 20.7°E	5 km
P	23.6°S 19.3°E	37 km
