= Poisson (crater) =

Crater on the Moon

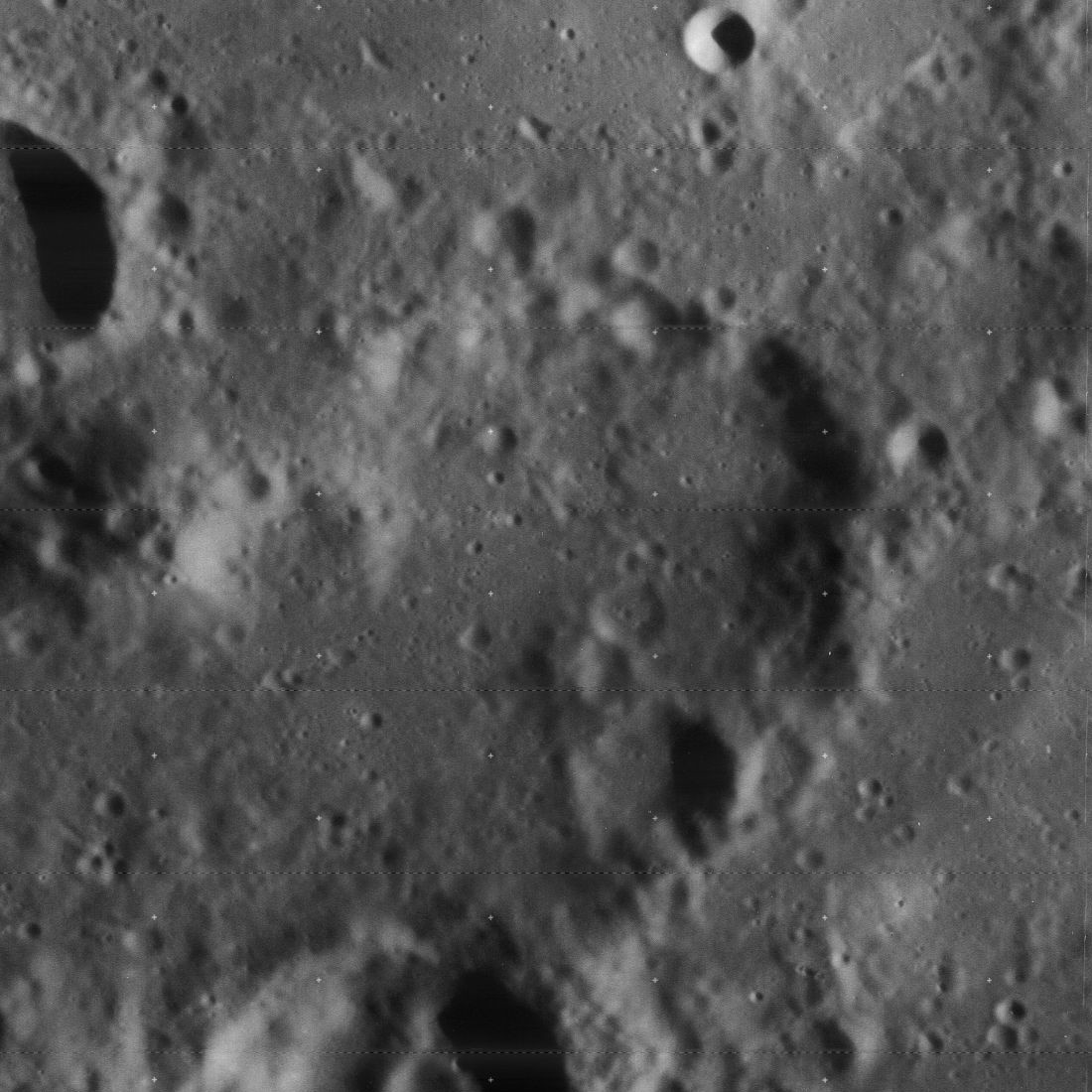
- Lunar Orbiter 4 image
- Coordinates: 30.4°S 10.6°E
- Diameter: 42 km
- Depth: 2.0 km
- Colongitude: 350° at sunrise
- Eponym: Siméon Denis Poisson

Poisson is a lunar impact crater that is located in the southern highlands of the Moon's near side. It was named after French mathematician Siméon Denis Poisson. It lies to the east of the crater Aliacensis and northwest of Gemma Frisius. To the northwest of Poisson is Apianus.

This heavily eroded crater shares a common floor with the satellite crater Poisson T to the west-southwest, and the two craters have more or less merged into a single formation with a narrower neck in between. The rim of Poisson is heavily eroded, and is overlain by several craters. Poisson U is intruding into the southern rim at the junction of Poisson and Poisson T. A low-walled formation is joined to the northern rim at the opposite side of the neck from Poisson U.

The interior floor of Poisson and Poisson T has been resurfaced by basaltic lava, leaving a level surface within the inner walls. A pair of old, worn craters lies along the inner wall in the southeast part of the crater.

== Satellite craters ==
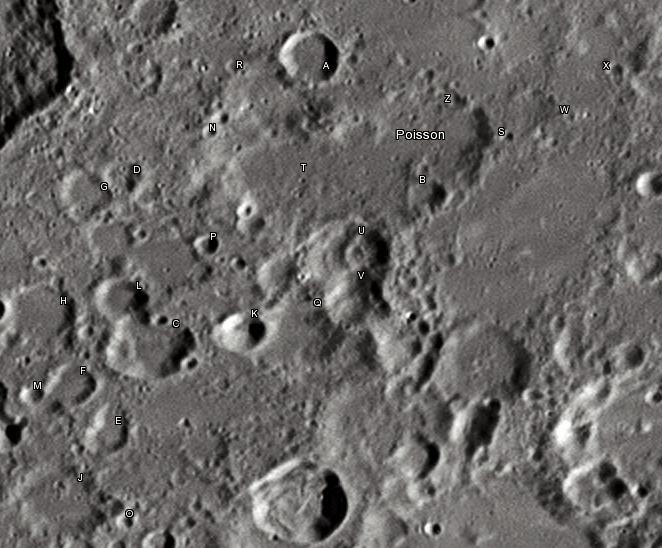
Poisson crater and its satellite craters taken from Earth in 2012 at the University of Hertfordshire's Bayfordbury Observatory with the telescopes Meade LX200 14" and Lumenera Skynyx 2-1

By convention these features are identified on lunar maps by placing the letter on the side of the crater midpoint that is closest to Poisson.

Poisson	Latitude	Longitude	Diameter
A	29.6° S	9.1° E	17 km
B	30.8° S	10.9° E	11 km
C	33.1° S	8.6° E	26 km
D	31.4° S	7.7° E	12 km
E	34.2° S	8.6° E	14 km
F	33.7° S	8.0° E	14 km
G	31.7° S	7.4° E	16 km
H	33.0° S	7.4° E	19 km
J	35.0° S	8.3° E	27 km
K	32.7° S	9.6° E	13 km
L	32.7° S	8.2° E	16 km
M	33.9° S	7.6° E	7 km
N	30.7° S	8.4° E	4 km
O	35.0° S	9.1° E	4 km
P	31.9° S	8.9° E	7 km
Q	32.6° S	10.2° E	28 km
R	30.0° S	8.4° E	5 km
S	29.9° S	11.4° E	4 km
T	31.1° S	9.2° E	25 km
U	31.6° S	10.3° E	25 km
V	32.0° S	10.6° E	16 km
W	29.6° S	11.9° E	3 km
X	29.0° S	12.3° E	5 km
Z	29.6° S	10.5° E	5 km
