= 12621 Alsufi =

Main-belt asteroid

Discovery
- Discovered by: C. J. van Houten; I. van Houten-G. Tom Gehrels
- Discovery site: Palomar Obs.
- Discovery date: 24 September 1960

Designations
- Named after: Abd al-Rahman al-Sufi (astronomer)
- Alternative designations: 6585 P-L · 1997 JJ_{12}
- Minor planet category: main-belt · Themis

Orbital characteristics
- Epoch 4 September 2017 (JD 2458000.5)
- Uncertainty parameter 0
- Observation arc: 56.33 yr (20,576 days)
- Aphelion: 3.5148 AU
- Perihelion: 2.6980 AU
- Semi-major axis: 3.1064 AU
- Eccentricity: 0.1315
- Orbital period (sidereal): 5.48 yr (2,000 days)
- Mean anomaly: 142.13°
- Mean motion: 0° 10^{m} 48^{s} / day
- Inclination: 2.4308°
- Longitude of ascending node: 148.06°
- Argument of perihelion: 204.34°

Physical characteristics
- Dimensions: 6.76 km (calculated)
- Synodic rotation period: 4.7194±0.0024 h
- Geometric albedo: 0.08 (assumed)
- Spectral type: L · C
- Absolute magnitude (H): 13.9 · 13.91±0.26 · 13.761±0.014 (R) · 14.21

12621 Alsufi, provisionally designated 6585 P-L, is a carbonaceous Themistian asteroid from the outer region of the asteroid belt, approximately 7 kilometers in diameter. It was discovered by astronomers during the Palomar–Leiden survey in 1960, and named for medieval Persian astronomer Abd al-Rahman al-Sufi.

== Discovery ==
Alsufi was discovered on 24 September 1960, by Dutch astronomer couple Ingrid and Cornelis van Houten at Leiden, on photographic plates taken by Dutch–American astronomer Tom Gehrels at the U.S. Palomar Observatory, California. No precoveries were taken prior to its discovery observation.

=== Palomar–Leiden survey ===
The survey designation "P-L" stands for Palomar–Leiden, named after Palomar Observatory and Leiden Observatory, which collaborated on the fruitful Palomar–Leiden survey in the 1960s. Gehrels used Palomar's Samuel Oschin telescope (also known as the 48-inch Schmidt Telescope), and shipped the photographic plates to Ingrid and Cornelis van Houten at Leiden Observatory where astrometry was carried out. The trio are credited with the discovery of several thousand minor planets.

== Classification and orbit ==
It is a member of the Themis family, a dynamical group of outer-belt asteroids with nearly coplanar ecliptical orbits. The C-type asteroid is also classified as a rather rare L-type asteroid by Pan-STARRS' large-scale survey. It orbits the Sun in the outer main-belt at a distance of 2.7–3.5 AU once every 5 years and 6 months (2,000 days). Its orbit has an eccentricity of 0.13 and an inclination of 2° with respect to the ecliptic.

== Physical characteristics ==
A rotational lightcurve of this asteroid was obtained from photometric observations made at the U.S. Palomar Transient Factory, California, in January 2012. It gave a rotation period of 4.7194±0.0024 hours with a brightness amplitude of 0.71 in magnitude (U=2). The Collaborative Asteroid Lightcurve Link assumes an albedo of 0.08 and calculates a diameter of 6.8 kilometers with an absolute magnitude of 14.21.

== Naming ==
This minor planet is named in honor of 10th-century Persian astronomer Abd al-Rahman al-Sufi (A.D. 903–986), also known by his western name, Azophi. Working in Isfahan, he produced his influential star atlas around A.D. 963. The atlas is based on both, Ptolemy's Almagest and on pre-Islamic star lore, and contains the earliest description of the Andromeda Galaxy. The approved naming citation was published by the Minor Planet Center on 22 January 2008 (M.P.C. 61764). The lunar crater Azophi is also named in his honour.
