= Pontanus (crater) =

Crater on the Moon

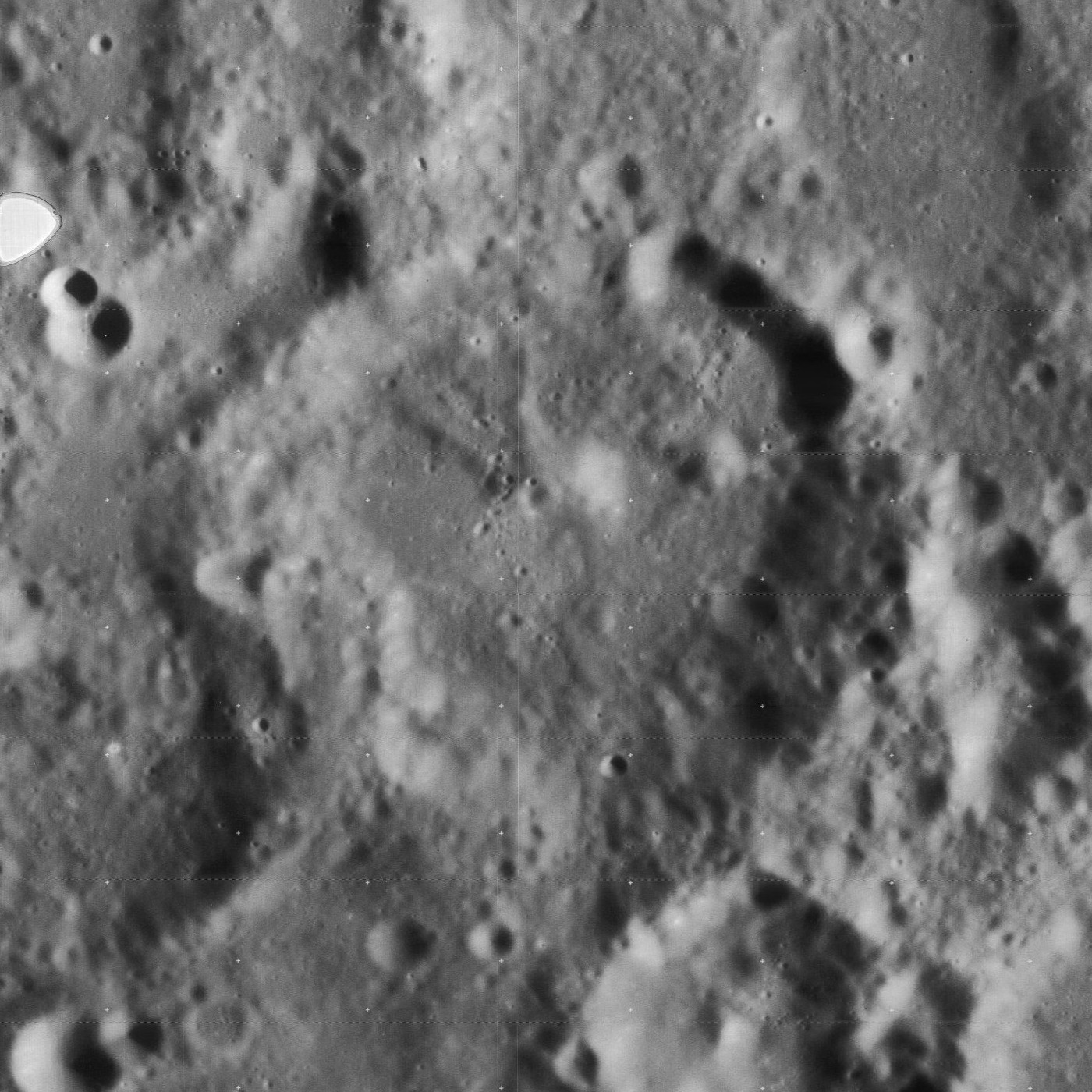
- Lunar Orbiter 4 image
- Coordinates: 28.42°S 14.36°E
- Diameter: 55.66 km (34.59 mi)
- Depth: 1.80 km (1.12 mi)
- Colongitude: 246° at sunrise
- Eponym: Giovanni Pontano

Pontanus is a lunar impact crater that is located in the southern highlands of the Moon's near side. It lies approximately midway between the craters Sacrobosco to the north-northeast and Gemma Frisius to the south-southwest.

The rim of this crater has been heavily worn by subsequent impacts, leaving a roughly circular, uneven slope about the interior. There is an outward protrusion in the rim to the south. The rim and inner wall to the north is less prominent, and is incised along the inner edge. The satellite crater Pontanus V is attached to the west-southwestern side. The interior floor is relatively uneven, particularly in the northern half, but is not marked by any significant craters. The crater is from the Pre-Nectarian period, 4.55 to 3.92 billion years ago.

The crater is named after the 15th-century Italian poet Giovanni Pontano.

== Satellite craters ==
By convention these features are identified on lunar maps by placing the letter on the side of the crater midpoint that is closest to Pontanus. Pontanus E is a concentric crater, similar to Hesiodus A crater.

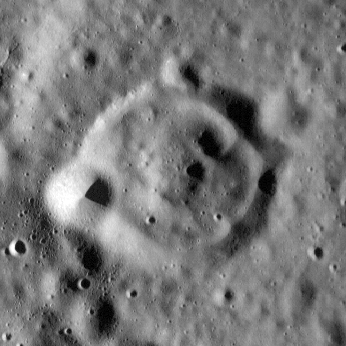
Satellite crater Pontanus E, north of Pontanus (LROC-WAC image)

Pontanus	Latitude	Longitude	Diameter
A	31.1° S	15.3° E	10 km
B	30.9° S	15.9° E	12 km
C	30.0° S	15.5° E	23 km
D	25.9° S	13.2° E	20 km
E	25.2° S	13.2° E	13 km
F	27.8° S	11.6° E	10 km
G	30.6° S	15.3° E	21 km
H	31.4° S	16.1° E	30 km
J	30.0° S	13.1° E	9 km
K	25.7° S	12.7° E	9 km
L	28.6° S	13.4° E	6 km
M	29.7° S	14.1° E	5 km
N	24.6° S	13.8° E	10 km
O	26.0° S	14.1° E	10 km
P	29.9° S	14.8° E	3 km
Q	27.4° S	14.5° E	5 km
R	28.1° S	15.6° E	6 km
S	31.4° S	16.8° E	7 km
T	29.2° S	16.6° E	8 km
U	29.5° S	17.5° E	5 km
V	29.2° S	13.2° E	33 km
W	29.1° S	17.6° E	7 km
X	28.5° S	15.8° E	13 km
Y	28.7° S	17.2° E	23 km
Z	27.9° S	12.9° E	5 km
