= Abenezra (crater) =

Lunar impact crater

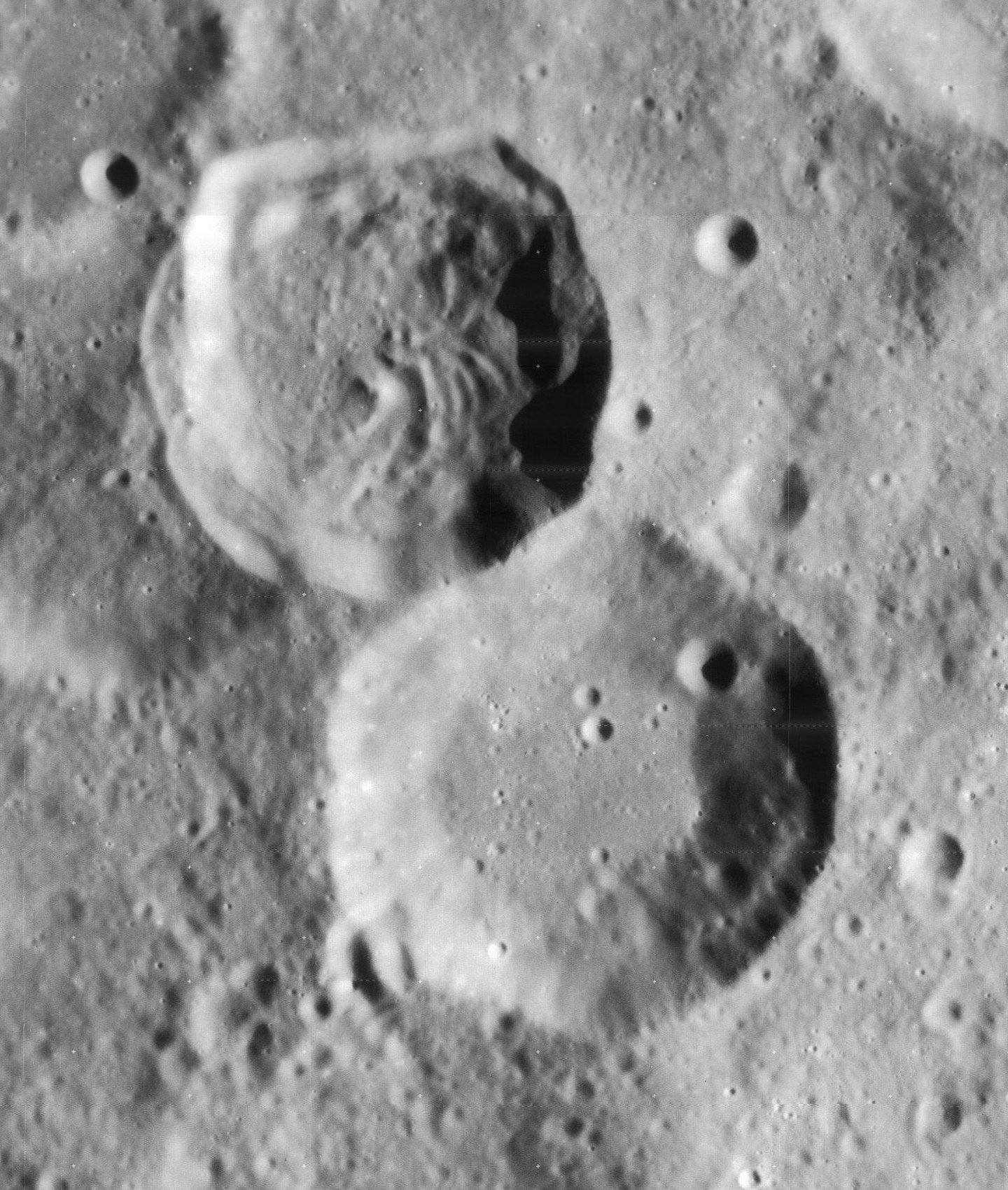
- Lunar Orbiter 4 image of the craters Abenezra (upper left) and Azophi (lower right)
- Coordinates: 21.0°S 11.9°E
- Diameter: 42 km (26 mi)
- Depth: 3.7 km (2.3 mi)
- Colongitude: 349° at sunrise
- Eponym: Abraham ibn Ezra

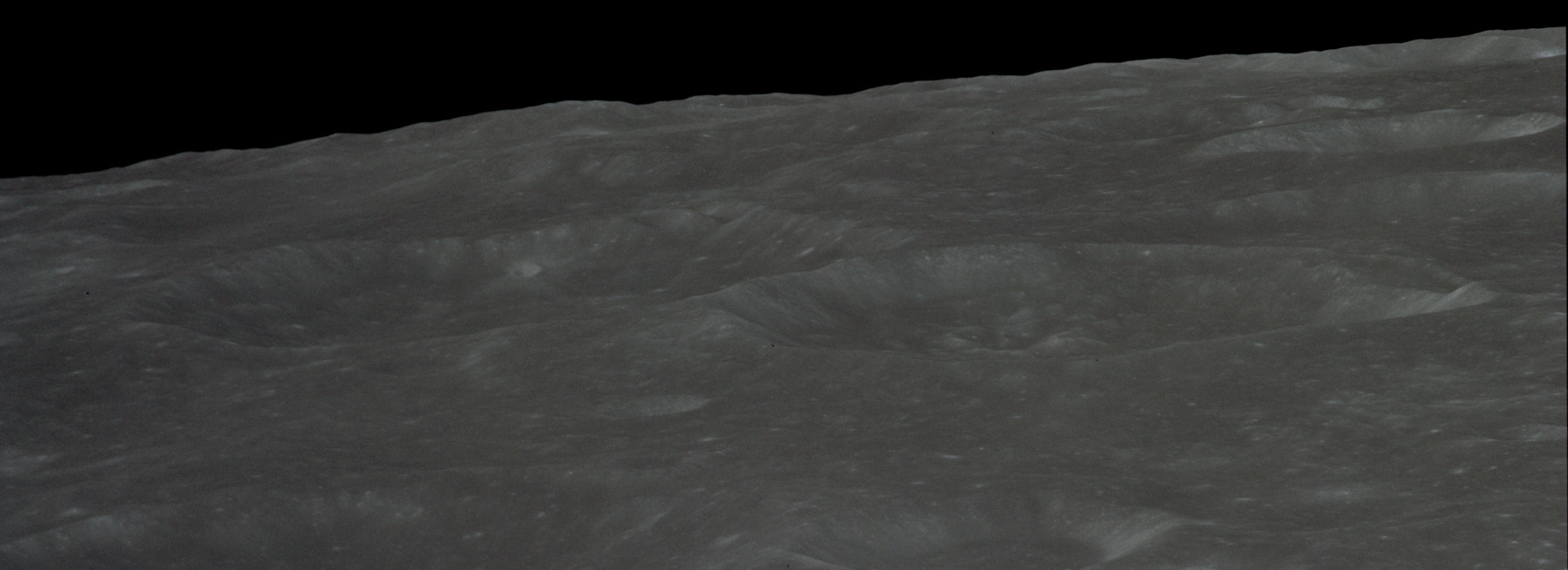
Oblique photo of Abenezra (right) and Azophi (left) from Apollo 14

Abenezra is a lunar impact crater located in the rugged highlands in the south-central section of the Moon. It is attached along the southeast rim to the crater Azophi, forming a twin pair with a straight wall between them. To the northeast lies the crater Geber, and further to the southeast is the larger Sacrobosco.

The rim of Abenezra has a noticeably polygonal shape, with uneven wall segments. The inner walls are terraced, and the eastern floor is irregular and ridged. These ridges form unusual, sinuous patterns across the floor. Under morning illumination, it is described as being cut in two by a curved ridge. The crater overlays the northeastern third of a ruined ring designated Abenezra C.

Abenezra is named after the Sephardic Jewish sage, poet, biblical commentator, and astronomer Abraham ibn Ezra. His name was added to the lunar nomenclature by Italian astronomer Giovanni Battista Riccioli in 1651. Its designation was formally adopted by the International Astronomical Union in 1935.

== Satellite craters ==
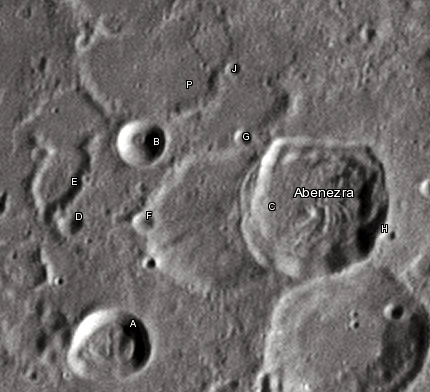
Abenezra and its satellite craters as seen from Earth

By convention these features are identified on lunar maps by placing the letter on the side of the crater midpoint that is closest to Abenezra.

| Abenezra | Latitude | Longitude | Diameter |
|---|---|---|---|
| A | 22.8° S | 10.5° E | 23 km |
| B | 20.8° S | 10.1° E | 14 km |
| C | 21.3° S | 11.1° E | 44 km |
| D | 21.7° S | 9.7° E | 8 km |
| E | 21.4° S | 9.4° E | 14 km |
| F | 21.5° S | 10.3° E | 7 km |
| G | 20.5° S | 11.0° E | 5 km |
| H | 21.1° S | 12.8° E | 4 km |
| J | 19.9° S | 10.7° E | 5 km |
| P | 19.9° S | 9.9° E | 44 km |

Abenezra A is a relatively recent impact compared to the ancient highlands in which it lies, with a depth of 3.31 km. It has an elongation of the rim toward the southwest, which may be the result of a low angle impact or an asymmetrical shape of the impacting body. The floor had a peculiar elevation following a north-south direction.
