= Azophi (crater) =

Crater on the Moon

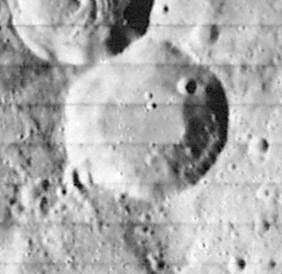
- Lunar Orbiter 4 image of Azophi crater
- Coordinates: 22.1°S 12.7°E
- Diameter: 47.54 km (29.54 mi)
- Depth: 3.7 km
- Colongitude: 348° at sunrise
- Eponym: Al Sufi (Azophi)

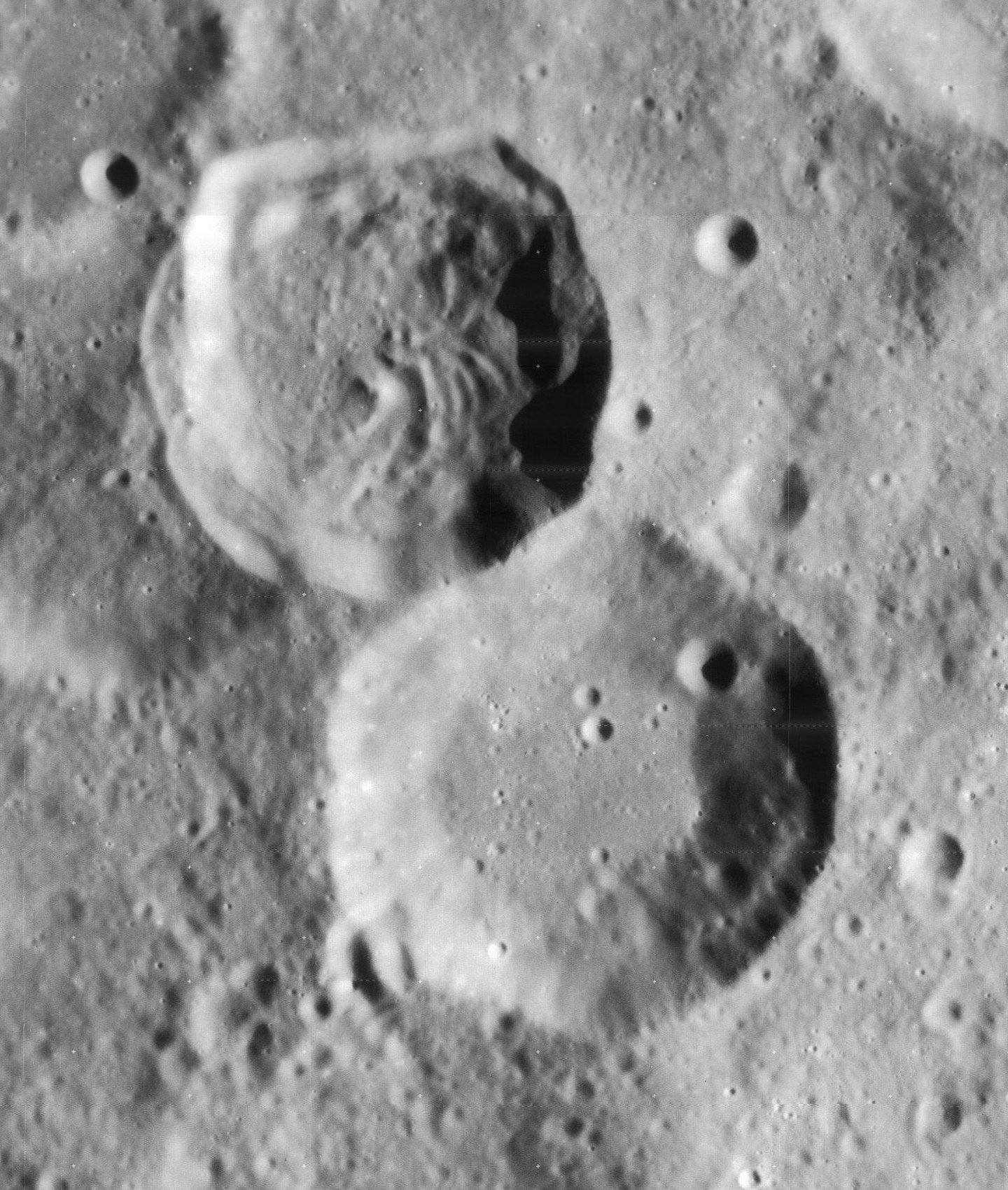
Lunar Orbiter 4 image of Azophi (lower right) and Abenezra (upper left)

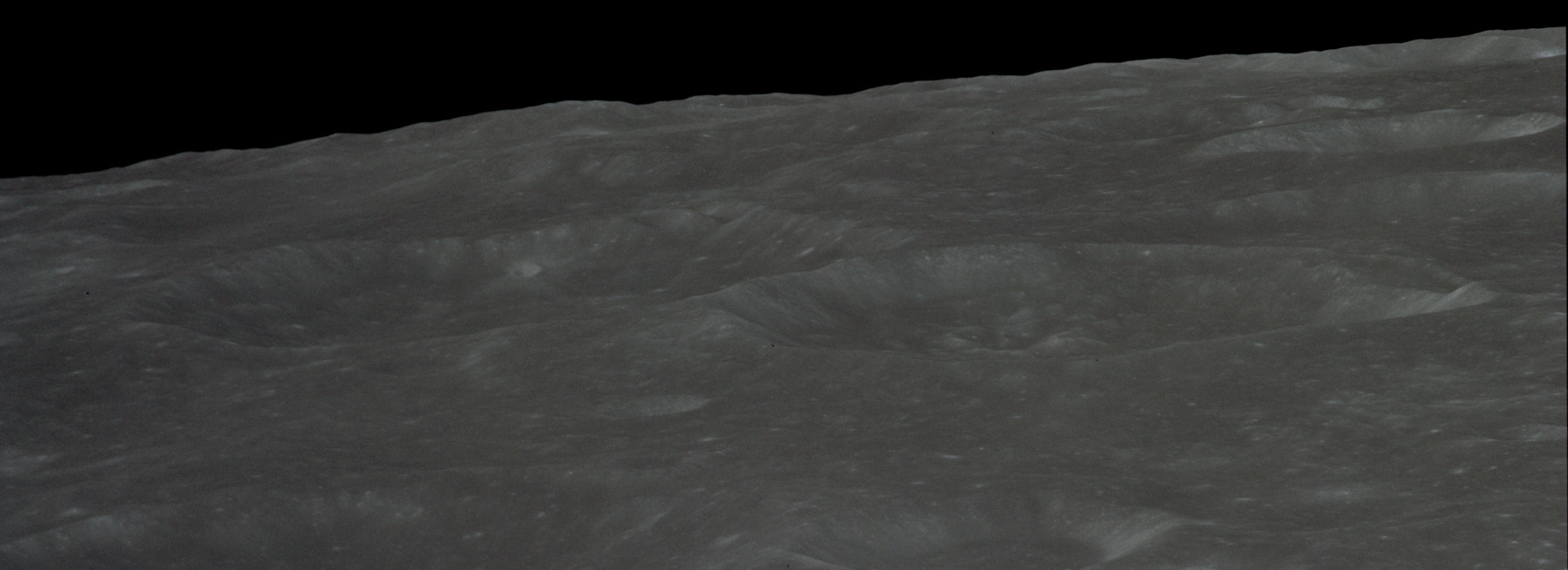
Oblique photo of Abenezra (right) and Azophi (left) from Apollo 14

Azophi is a lunar impact crater that lies in the rugged south-central highlands of the Moon. The northwest rim is attached to the slightly smaller crater Abenezra, to the east-southeast is the large and irregular Sacrobosco, and to the west-southwest is Playfair.

The wide outer rim of Azophi has a somewhat polygonal shape with rounded corners. The edge is relatively sharp and cleft-like. The rim is not significantly worn or impacted by smaller craters, with the exception of Azophi C, which lies on the inner northeast wall. The flat surface of the interior floor lacks a central peak and is only marked by a few small craterlets. Price (1988) describes it as a "rather dusky interior with some light spots."

This crater is named after the Persian astronomer Abd Al-Rahman Al Sufi (903-986), also known by his western name, Azophi. Its name was incorporated into lunar nomenclature by Italian astronomer Giovanni Riccioli in 1651. The designation was officially adopted by the International Astronomical Union in 1935.

== Satellite craters ==
By convention these features are identified on lunar maps by placing the letter on the side of the crater midpoint that is closest to Azophi.

Azophi	Latitude	Longitude	Diameter
A	24.4° S	11.2° E	29 km
B	23.6° S	10.6° E	19 km
C	21.8° S	13.1° E	5 km
D	24.3° S	13.4° E	9 km
E	23.5° S	13.8° E	5 km
F	22.2° S	13.9° E	6 km
G	23.9° S	12.3° E	53 km
H	25.5° S	11.8° E	21 km
J	21.2° S	13.1° E	8 km

== See also ==
- 12621 Alsufi, asteroid named after Al Sufi (Azophi)
