= Gemma Frisius (crater) =

Crater on the Moon

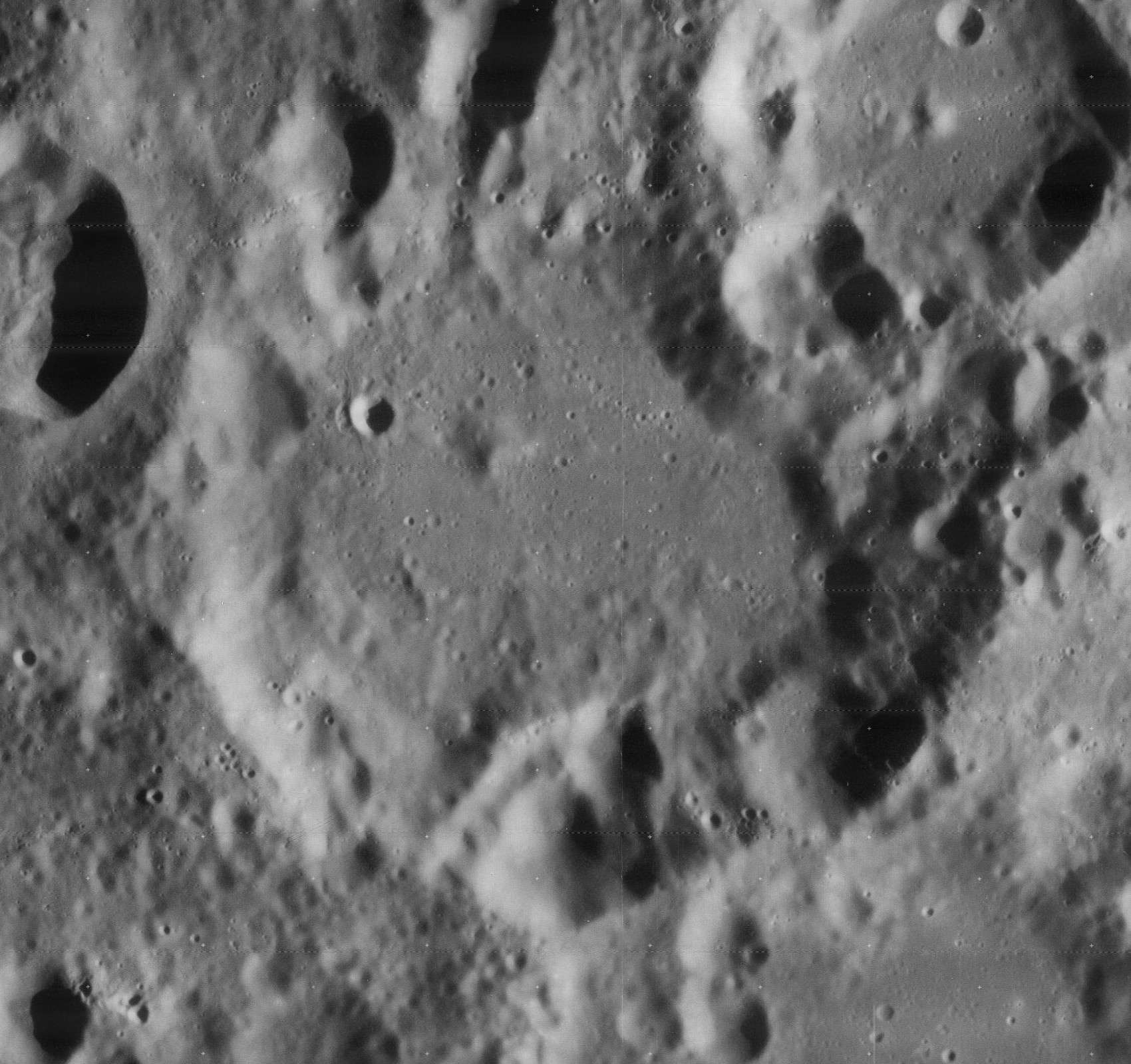
- Coordinates: 34.2°S 13.3°E
- Diameter: 88 km
- Depth: 4.7 km
- Colongitude: 347° at sunrise
- Eponym: Gemma Frisius

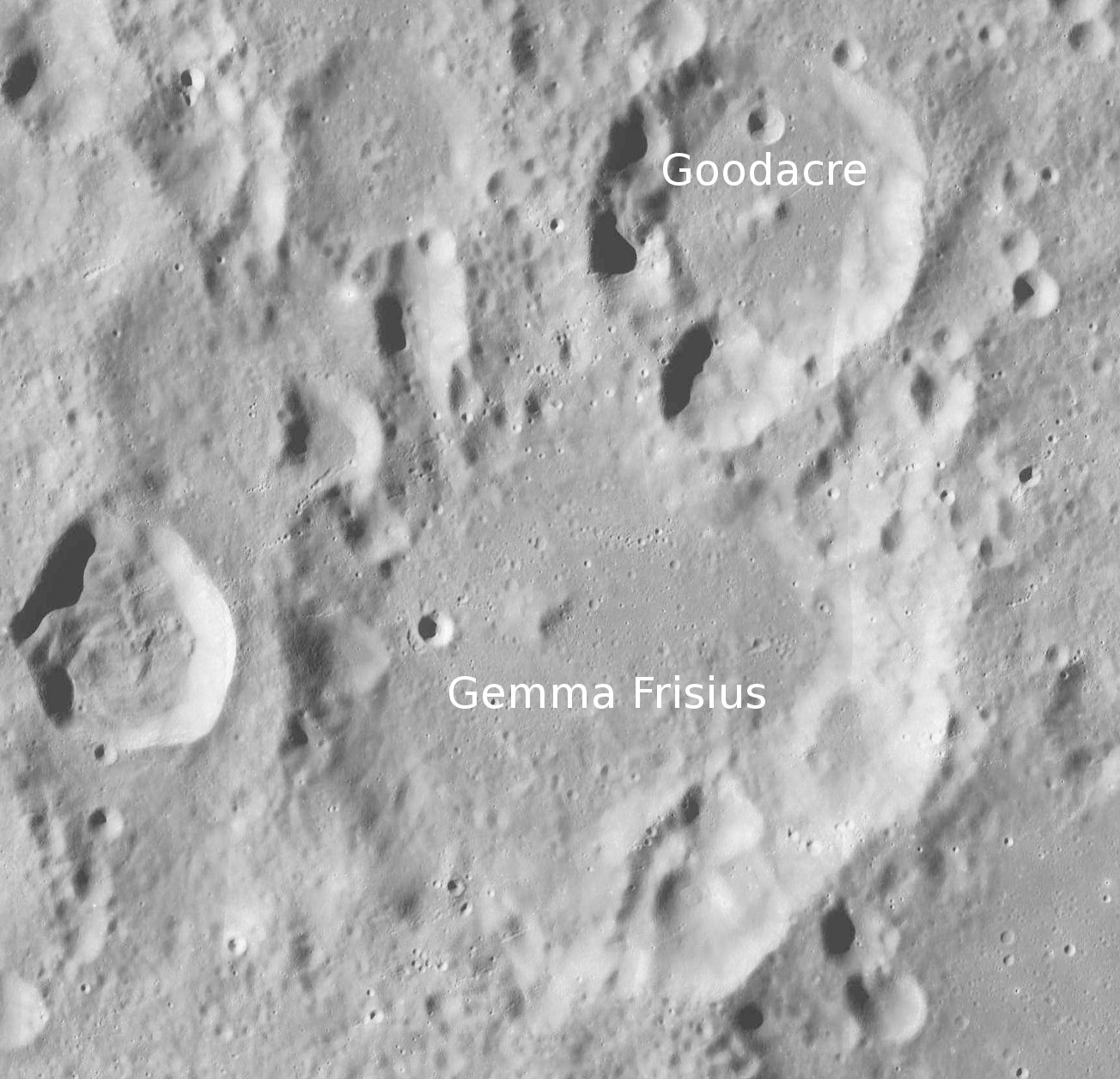

Gemma Frisius is a lunar impact crater that is located in the rugged southern highlands of the Moon. It was named after Dutch physician Gemma Frisius. It lies to the north of the walled plain called Maurolycus, and southeast of the smaller crater Poisson. The crater Goodacre is attached to the northeast rim.

The outer wall of this crater has been heavily damaged by impacts, particularly along the north and west sides. The smaller satellite craters D, G, and H are attached to this damaged crater. As some observers have noted, this crater formation bears a certain resemblance to a paw print with these craters forming three of the toes and the crater Goodacre the fourth.

The southeastern rim of the crater is also worn, and the inner wall has slumped nearly a third of the distance across the interior floor. The remainder of the floor is relatively level and deep, with a central peak that is offset to the northwest of the midpoint.

== Satellite craters ==
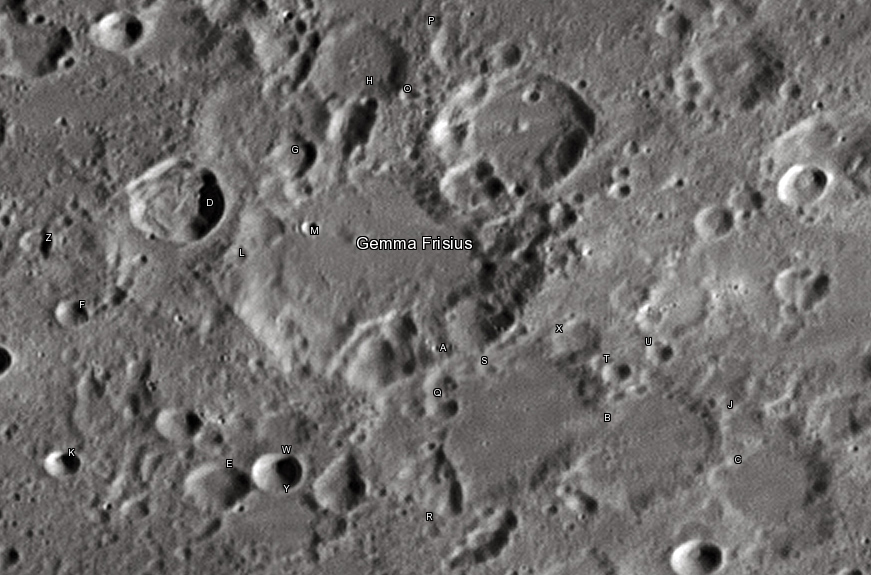
Gemma Frisius crater and its satellite craters taken from Earth in 2012 at the University of Hertfordshire's Bayfordbury Observatory with the telescopes Meade LX200 14" and Lumenera Skynyx 2-1

By convention these features are identified on lunar maps by placing the letter on the side of the crater midpoint that is closest to Gemma Frisius.

Gemma Frisius	Latitude	Longitude	Diameter
A	35.8° S	15.2° E	68 km
B	35.5° S	17.1° E	41 km
C	35.6° S	18.8° E	35 km
D	34.3° S	10.9° E	28 km
E	37.2° S	12.8° E	19 km
F	35.8° S	10.3° E	9 km
G	33.2° S	11.4° E	37 km
H	32.4° S	12.2° E	28 km
J	35.1° S	18.1° E	12 km
K	37.4° S	11.0° E	10 km
L	34.8° S	11.8° E	6 km
M	34.3° S	12.5° E	5 km
O	32.5° S	12.9° E	6 km
P	31.8° S	12.8° E	4 km
Q	35.8° S	14.8° E	9 km
R	37.1° S	15.3° E	5 km
S	35.2° S	15.1° E	6 km
T	34.9° S	16.4° E	8 km
U	34.5° S	16.8° E	8 km
W	36.9° S	13.3° E	15 km
X	34.7° S	15.8° E	15 km
Y	37.4° S	13.5° E	28 km
Z	35.1° S	9.6° E	10 km
