= Sacrobosco (crater) =

Lunar crater

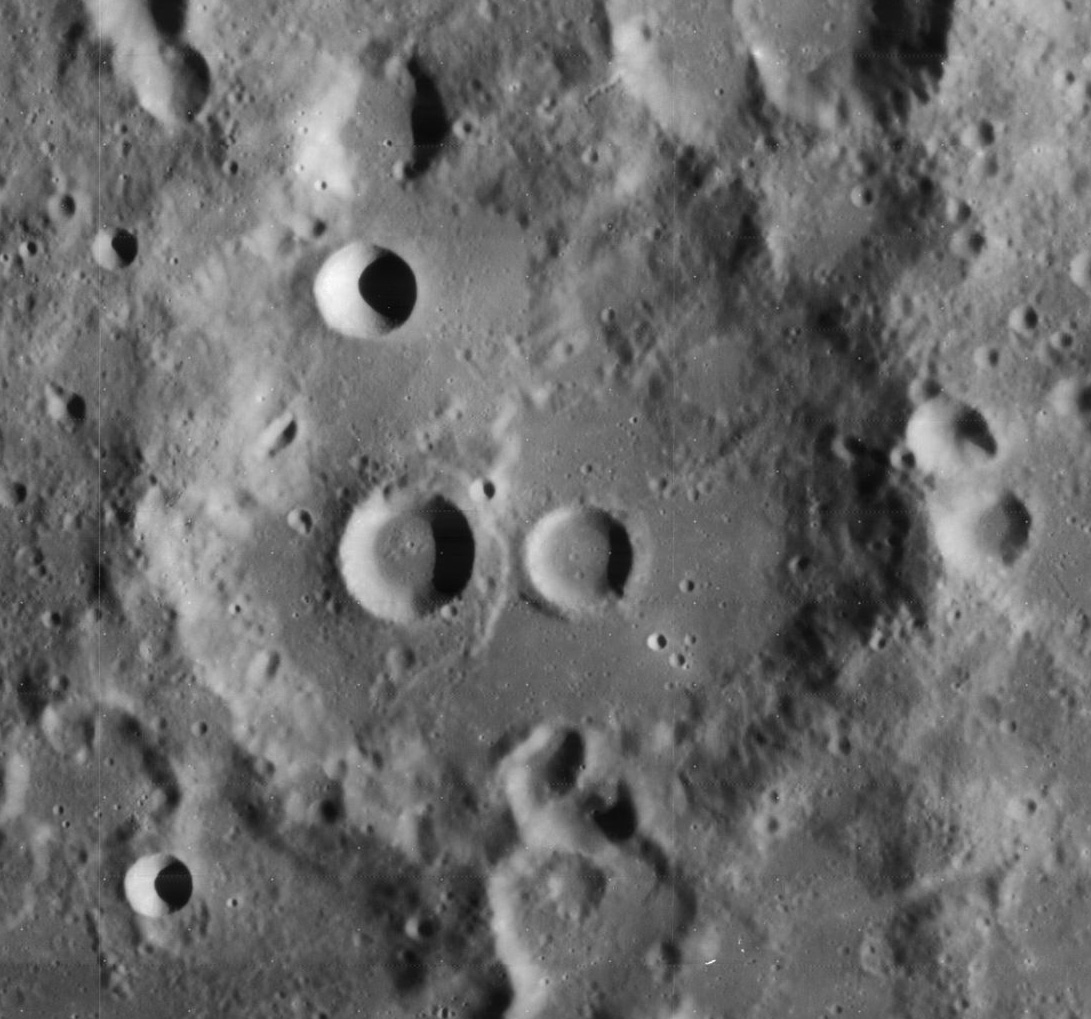
- Lunar Orbiter 4 image
- Coordinates: 23.7°S 16.7°E
- Diameter: 98 km
- Depth: 2.8 km
- Colongitude: 344° at sunrise
- Formation: Pre-Nectarian
- Eponym: Johannes de Sacrobosco

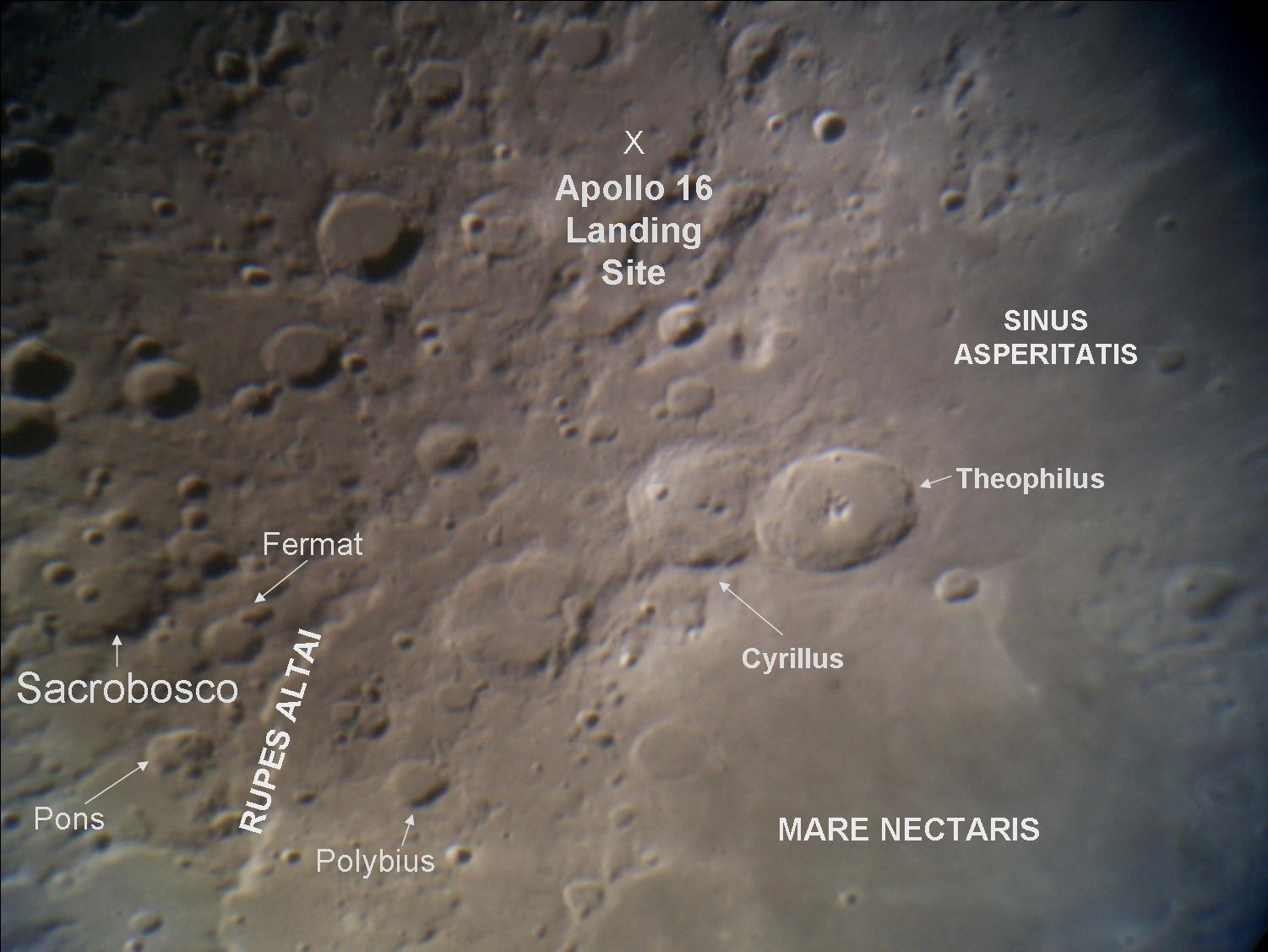
Location of Sacrobosco

Sacrobosco is an irregular lunar impact crater that is located in the rugged southern highlands to the west of the Rupes Altai escarpment. On the lunar geologic timescale, this crater dates to the Pre-Nectarian epoch. It is a readily identified feature due to the three circular craters that lie on its floor. The rim of Sacrobosco is heavily worn and eroded, especially in the northeast. The floor is relatively flat in the south, except where overlain by Sacrobosco A and B, but is somewhat irregular in the northeast.

To the northwest of Sacrobosco is the double crater Abenezra and Azophi. To the east-northeast is Fermat, and to the south-southwest lies Pontanus.

== Satellite craters ==
By convention these features are identified on Lunar maps by placing the letter on the side of the crater midpoint that is closest to Sacrobosco.

Sacrobosco	Latitude	Longitude	Diameter
A	24.0° S	16.2° E	17 km
B	23.9° S	16.9° E	14 km
C	23.0° S	15.8° E	13 km
D	21.6° S	17.7° E	24 km
E	26.1° S	17.7° E	13 km
F	21.1° S	16.7° E	19 km
G	20.7° S	16.2° E	20 km
H	23.7° S	18.7° E	13 km
J	23.6° S	14.6° E	5 km
K	22.9° S	14.7° E	6 km
L	25.6° S	15.1° E	9 km
M	25.3° S	16.3° E	8 km
N	27.0° S	16.5° E	6 km
O	21.1° S	16.0° E	6 km
P	20.6° S	17.3° E	5 km
Q	21.6° S	17.5° E	42 km
R	22.3° S	15.7° E	21 km
S	26.5° S	18.0° E	19 km
T	24.9° S	16.8° E	12 km
U	24.0° S	14.3° E	5 km
V	24.5° S	16.1° E	4 km
W	24.3° S	17.3° E	2 km
X	26.5° S	16.3° E	23 km
