= Castle of Bouka =

Ottoman fortification in Preveza, Greece

Coordinates: 38°57′22″N 20°45′02″E

- Κάστρο της Μπούκας
- Preveza, Epirus, Greece
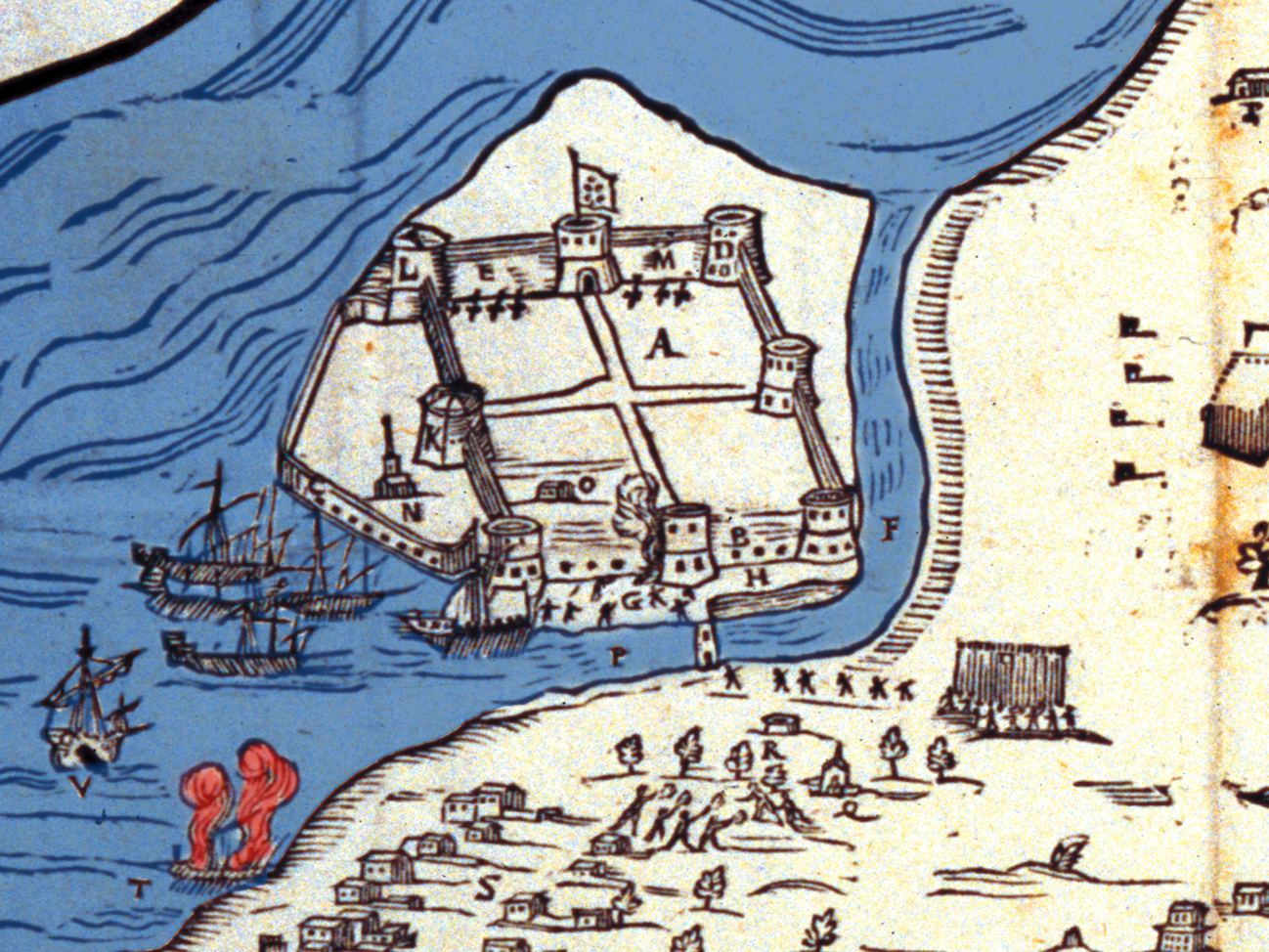
- Plan of the castle of Bouka. Engraving by Giovanni Orlandi, 1605

Site information
- Type: Shore castle, citadel
- Owner: Greek Ministry of Culture
- Controlled by: Ottoman Empire 1478–1684; Republic of Venice 1684–1701
- Open to the public: Yes
- Condition: Total ruin

Location
- Location within Greece

Site history
- Built: 1478
- Built by: Mehmed II
- Materials: hewn stone (ashlar)
- Demolished: 1701

Garrison information
- Garrison: 15 soldiers (1481); 80-100 soldiers (1605); 250 soldiers (1670)

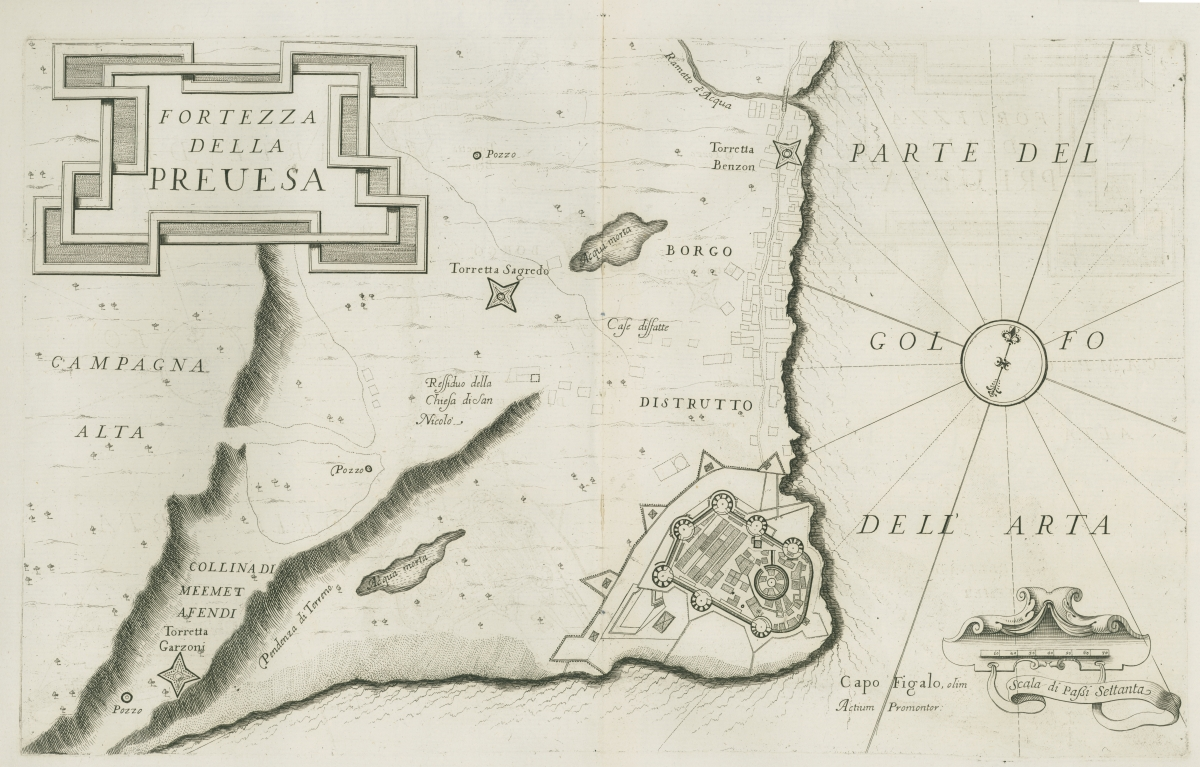
Engraved map of Preveza depicting the Castle of Bouka

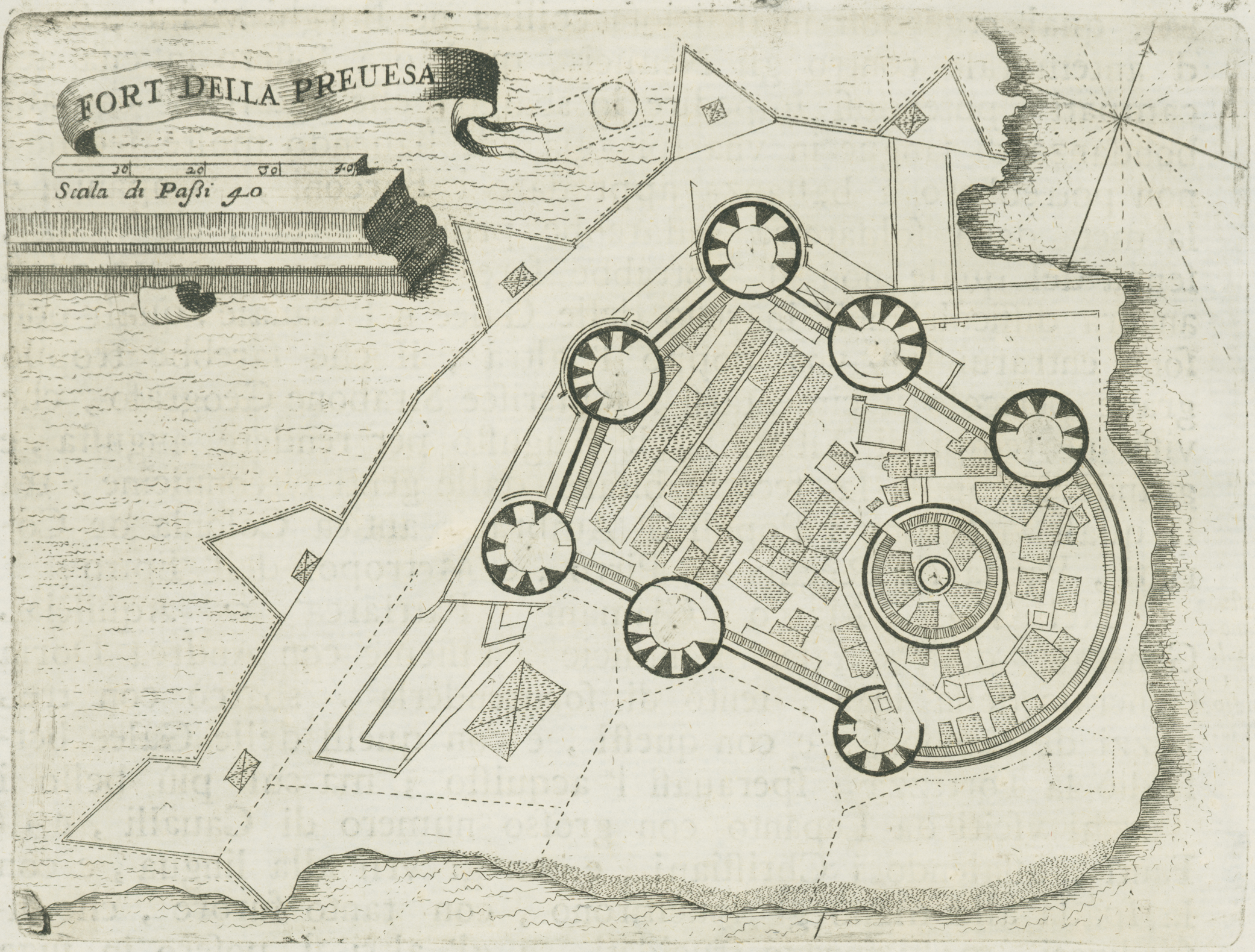
Plan of the castle of Bouka. Engraving by Coronelli, 1686

The castle of Bouka (Greek: Κάστρο της Μπούκας, deriving from the Italian word bocca) was the first major Ottoman fortification of Preveza, in northwestern Greece. It was constructed by the Ottomans in 1478, in order to control the straits of the Ambracian Gulf. During its life it underwent several improvements by the Ottomans and one by the Venetians, after they conquered it in 1684. In 1701, the Venetians blew the castle up before they handed Preveza over to the Ottomans, according to the terms of the Treaty of Karlowitz. The castle of Bouka was standing upon the site which today is called "Paliosaraga" (Greek: Παλιοσάραγα, which means "Old Seraglio"). The summer seraglio of Ali Pasha of Yannina was built on the castle's remains, during the early 1810s.

After Preveza's capture by the Greek Army in 1912, an Army Supply-Unit was based on the site of the castle. Today, there are very few remains of the castle of Bouka, despite the fact that the site has generally not been built up.

== History ==
The castle lived for just over 220 years, from 1478 till 1701, under Ottoman and Venetian rule.

=== Under the Ottomans (1478 – 1684) ===
The castle was built by the Ottomans in 1478, fifteen years after their definite occupation of the region of Preveza and Riniassa. The date of the castle's construction is also mentioned in the Short Chronicle number 71.7: ἔκτισεν τὴν Πρέβεζαν ἐπὶ ἔτους ‚ςϡπς΄, which means: "He fortified Preveza in the year 6986" [Anno Mundi]. The year 6986 Anno Mundi corresponds to 1.9.1477 – 31.8.1478 in the Gregorian calendar.

Leonardo III Tocco, Count of Cephalonia, in a manuscript letter written on 31 March 1478, and addressed to a member of a powerful Venetian family, immediately recognised and pointed out that the construction of the castle at the mouth of the Ambracian Gulf was a danger for the Republic of Venice. Because of this, he sent his relative, Bogordo di Tocco, to Venice in order to seek their assistance. In Leonardo's letter the castle is mentioned as "castello ala bucca delo gulfo" ("castle at the mouth/entrance of the gulf").

During the first Ottoman years, the castle became known as Preveze kalesi, (the castle in the Passage), and it eventually gave its name to the small human settlement which was formed north of the castle. The first time that the name Preveza has been recorded, on a clearly dated document, is in a letter by f. Leonardo Michiel of Corfu, in 1481. Despite the fact that Preveza is mentioned in two versions of The Chronicle of Morea (the French version of the Brussels manuscript, and the Greek version of the Copenhagen manuscript), which are considered to be dated in the late 14th or the early 15th century, Karabelas refutes this view and proposes the re-dating of these two manuscripts.

The castle was presumably strengthened by the Ottomans in 1486–87, as well as in 1495 in order to ward off the imminent danger from the West, due to the conquering plans of the French king Charles VIII, which, however, were eventually abandoned. The castle was also improved in 1502, in 1530, in 1552 during the reign of Suleiman the Magnificent, in 1572, and by the Venetians, after they conquered Preveza, in 1684.

When the great Ottoman traveler Evliya Çelebi visited Preveza, around 1670, he described Bouka as a castle guarded by a garrison of 250 soldiers, with narrow streets, and about 100 small houses without gardens, as well as a mosque constructed by Sultan Suleiman I (r. 1520 – 1566). Outside the walls of the castle there were 300 large houses with gardens and a bazaar with 100 shops.

==== The castle under attack ====
During its Ottoman "life" the castle was attacked by opposing forces four times.

===== In 1481 =====
In 29 July 1481, a small fleet of twelve Catalan galleys and nine fustas, under the command of captain Vilamarino, after sailing via Corfu, they arrived at the entrance of the Ambracian Gulf, where they noticed a new Ottonam castle, which was called Preveza. They attacked it and they temporarily conquered it, as it was defended by only fifteen Turkish soldiers. They looted it and went on towards the castle of Santa Maura.

===== In 1501 =====
At the end of January 1501, after the Ottomans had suddenly conquered Methone and Corone in the Peloponnese, the Venetians launched counterattacks. In this context, the Venetian fleet, under the vice-admiral Benedetto Pesaro, attacked Vonitsa in the Ambracian Gulf, and captured eleven Ottoman galleys, which had been built in the shipyards of Preveza. The Venetian fleet exited the Gulf on 29 January 1501, under the fire of the castle of Bouka.

===== In 1538 =====
In 28 September 1538, in the seas to the northwest of the Lefkas island, a famous sea battle took place, which in historically known as the Sea battle of Preveza. The Ottoman fleet, under Hayreddin Barbarossa, prevailed over the allied fleets of the Christian Powers of Europe. The castle of Bouka played a key role in this conflict.

===== In 1605 =====
During the night of the 2nd towards 3 May 1605, military forces of the Order of the Knights of Saint Stephen of Pisa, under colonel Federico Ghislieri (Italian: Federico Fabio Ghislieri), landed on the west coast of the Preveza peninsula, near the present-day beach of Alonaki, and attacked the castle of Bouka, which was defended by an Ottoman force of 80–100 men. At dawn, the galleys of the corps, under vice-admiral Iacopo Inghirami, arrived within firing distance of the castle of Bouka, which they continuously bombarded and thus forced the Ottomans to capitulate. This was followed by the plundering and burning of the warehouses and buildings of the castle, as well as the settlement of Preveza by the Florentines, whose soldiers captured about 250 inhabitants of Preveza, both Muslims and Christians, and took considerable booty. When the flotilla reached Antipaxoi, the Christian prisoners were freed. The one-day sacking of Preveza by the Florentines cannot be considered as an occupation by them, since the Ottomans seem to have returned to the castle of Bouka a few days later.

=== Under the Venetians (1684 – 1701) ===
The Venetians captured the castle on 29 September 1684, in the beginning of the 6th Ottoman Venetian war and they immediately made alterations to it. At the end of the war they had to give it up to the Ottomans.

The castle was demolished by the Venetians in 1701, before surrendering the area to the Ottomans, in accordance to the provisions of the Treaty of Karlowitz and other bilateral agreements. Immediately after the demolition of the castle of Bouka and the handing over of Preveza, the Ottomans started constructing a large castle in order to defend the town and the straits of the Ambracian Gulf. The new stronghold was built one kilometre north of the demolished castle, at a distance of a cannon-shot from it, and it is now known as Castle of Saint Andrew (its name during the late Ottoman times was Iç Kale).

== Sources ==
- Asonitis, Spyros N. (1985). Το Νότιο Ιόνιο κατά τον Όψιμο Μεσαίωνα. Κομητεία Κεφαλληνίας, Δουκάτο Λευκάδας, Αιτωλοακαρνανία (in Greek). Athens.
- Donos, Dimosthenis (2007). "Stratagems: Morosini's capture of Preveza (1684) according to related documents". Prevezanika Chronika (in Greek). Preveza: Municipal Library of Preveza. vol. 43-44, pp. 66–111.
- Donos, Dimosthenis (2009). "Politics, piracy and art: The plunder of Preveza by the Knights of St Stephen in 1605". Prevezanika Chronika (in Greek). Preveza: Municipal Library of Preveza. vol. 45-46, pp. 63–116.
- Donos, Dimosthenis (2015). "Bembo or Sanudo ? The Venetian military operations in the Ambracian Gulf during 1500 (m.v.) and their historiographical adventures". Prevezanika Chronika (in Greek). Preveza: Municipal Library of Preveza. vol. 51-52, pp. 38–94.
- Ganali, Argyro K. (2022). "«Onde sepolta Prevesa in sè stessa sopraviva la sola memoria» – The first Venetian domination of Preveza and its end (1684-1701)". Tesserae of Preveza's History (in Greek and English). Preveza: Actia Nicopolis Foundation. vol. γ΄, pp. 13–77.
- Karabelas, Nikos D. (2009). "Henry Holland. A british physician travels in the region of Preveza". Prevezanika Chronika (in Greek). Preveza: Municipal Library of Preveza. vol. 45-46, pp. 142–215.
- Karabelas, Nikos D. (2010). Vrelli-Zachou, Marina; Stavrakos, Christos (eds.). The castle of Bouka (1478-1701). Fortified Preveza through sources. Preveza B. Proceedings of the Second International Symposium for the History and Culture of Preveza (16–20 September 2009) (in Greek and English). Preveza: University of Ioannina, Municipality of Preveza, Actia Nicopolis Foundation. vol. I, pp. 395–433. ISBN 978-960-99475-1-0.
- Karabelas, Nikos D. (2012). Ottoman Fortifications in Preveza in 1702. The First Phase of the Castle of İç Kale. Journal of the Center for Ottoman Studies (OTAM) 32 (in English and Turkish). Ankara: Ankara University. pp. 47-66. ISSN 1019-469X.
- Karabelas, Nikos D. (2015). The Ottoman conquest of Preveza and its first castle. Proceedings of the XVIth Congress of Turkish History (20–24 September 2010) (in English and Turkish). Ankara: Türk Tarih Kurumu. vol. 4.2, pp. 967–998. ISBN 978-975-16-2988-3.
- Karabelas, Nikos D. (2017). "The fortifications of a strategic Passage". Prevezanika Chronika (in Greek and English). Preveza: Municipal Library of Preveza. vol. 53-54, pp. 99–140.
- Karabelas, Nikos D. (2020). "The foundation of Preveza and the dating of two versions of The Chronicle of Morea". Annuaire de l'Association d'Etudes Byzantines. Athens: Association d'Etudes Byzantines. vol. 56, pp. 93–120.
- Maltezou, Chryssa (1983). "Προσωπογραφικά βυζαντινής Πελοποννήσου και ξενοκρατούμενου ελληνικού χώρου (με αφορμή τον φάκελο Foscari της Βενετίας)". Βυζαντινά Σύμμεικτα (in Greek). Athens: Institouto Vyzantinōn Ereunōn. vol. 5, pp. 1–27. ISSN 1105-1639.
- Neumeier, Emily (2018). "Trans-imperial encounter on the Ionian Sea: A French engineer's account of constructing Ottoman fortifications". Tessarae of Preveza's History (in English and Greek). Preveza: Actia Nicopolis Foundation. vol. α΄, pp. 11–54. ISBN 978 960 7660 26 8.
- Pujeau, Emmanuelle (2010). Vrelli-Zachou, Marina; Stavrakos, Christos (eds.). Preveza in 1538: The background of a very complex situation. Preveza B. Proceedings of the Second International Symposium for the History and Culture of Preveza (16–20 September 2009). Preveza: University of Ioannina, Municipality of Preveza, Actia Nicopolis Foundation. vol. I, pp. 121–138. ISBN 978-960-99475-1-0.

== Gallery ==
Views of the castle of Bouka, Preveza, Greece, during its life.
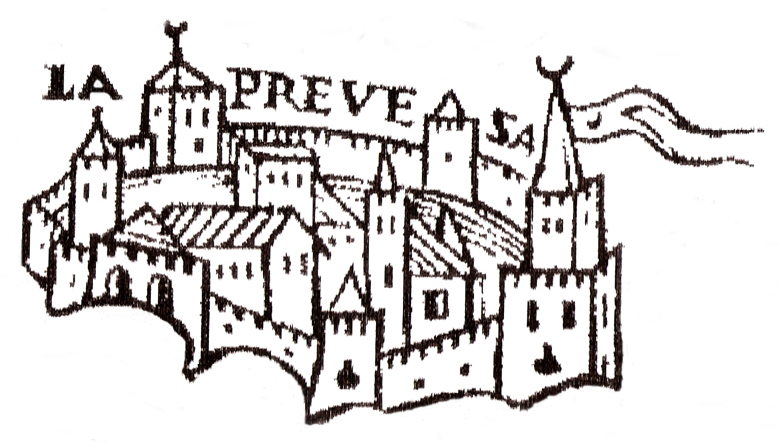
Woodcut of the Castle of Bouka by Francesco Genesio, 1538

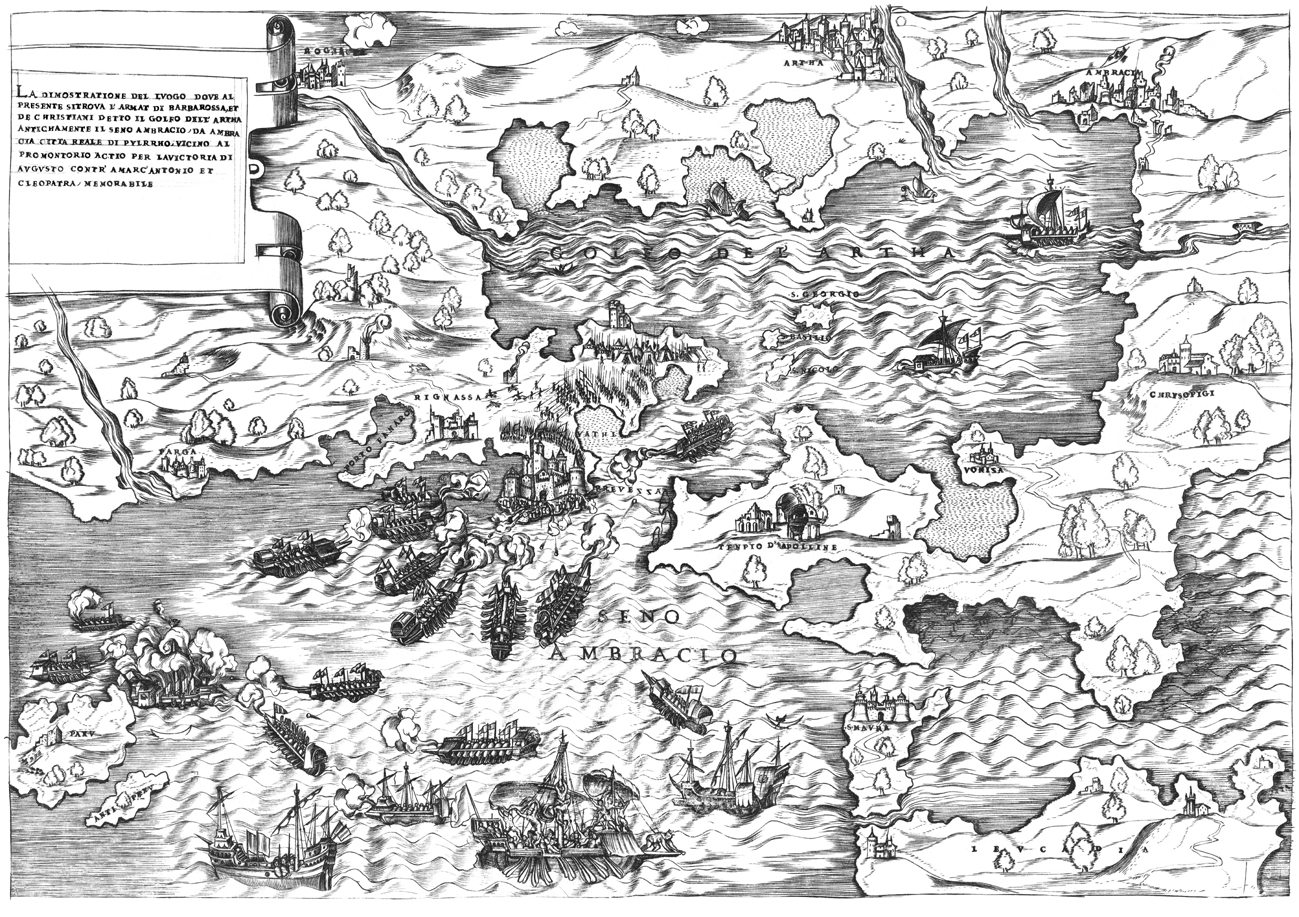
Etching of the Castle of Bouka by Antonio Salamanca, 1540 c.

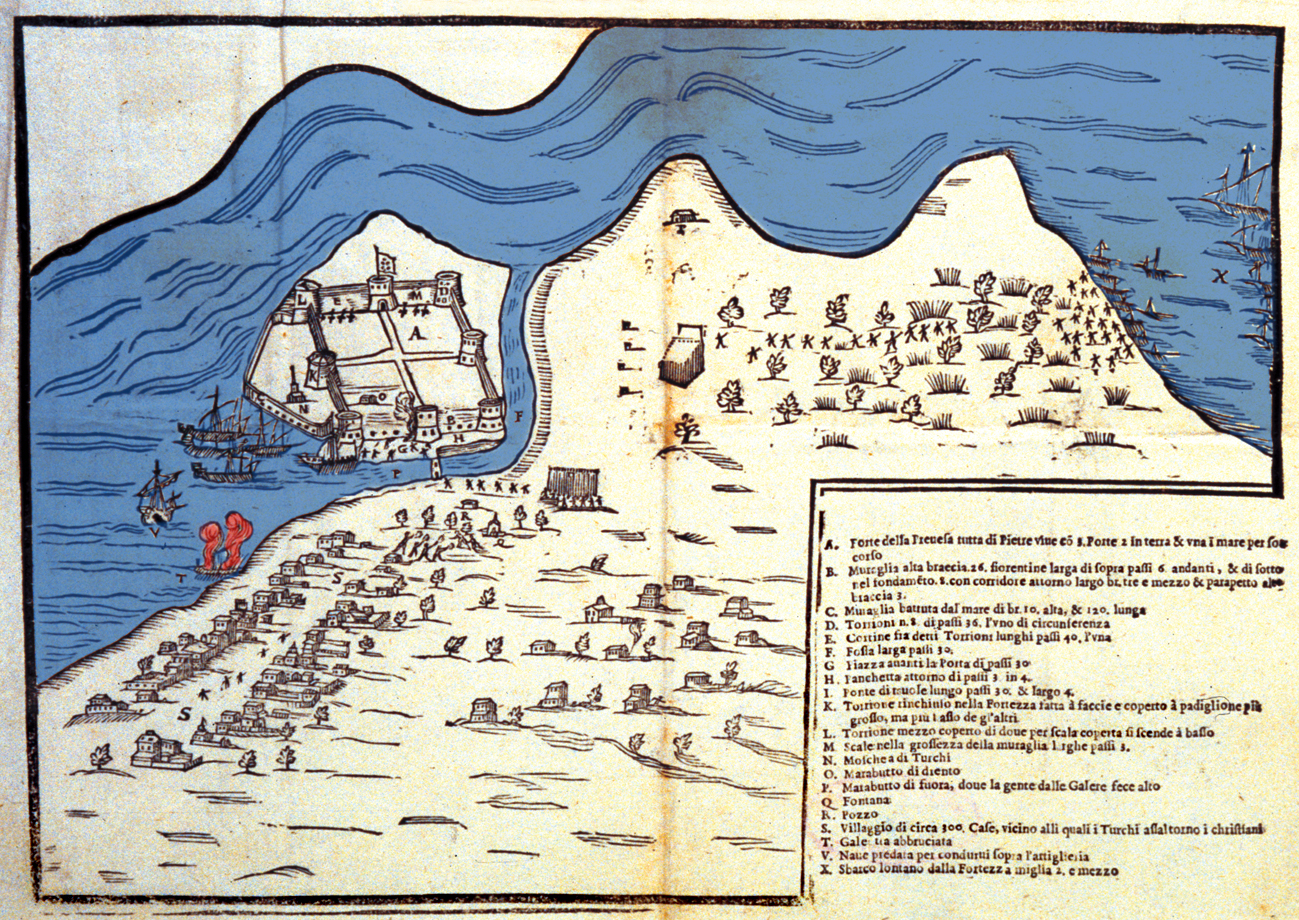
Plan of the Castle of Bouka. Wood engraving by Giovanni Orlandi, 1605

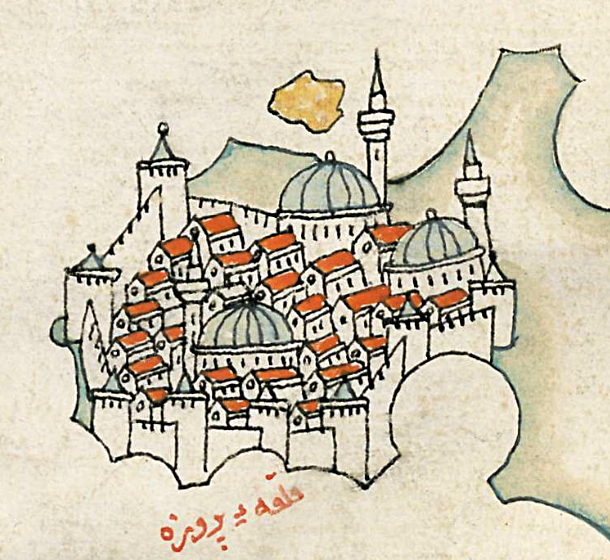
Coloured sketch of the Castle of Bouka. After Piri Reis, beginning of the 17th c.

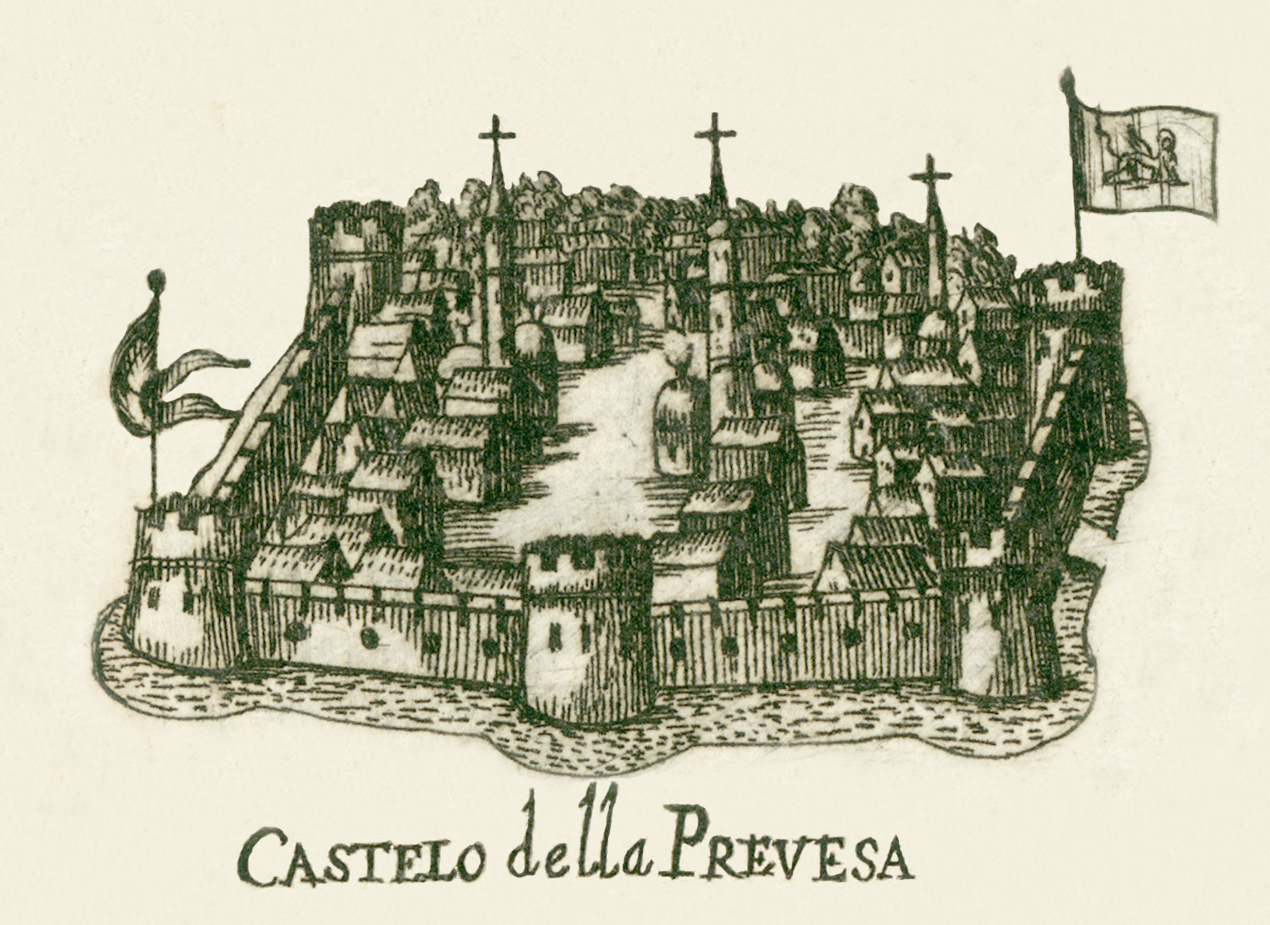
Etching of the Castle of Bouka by Giuseppe Longhi, 1684 c.

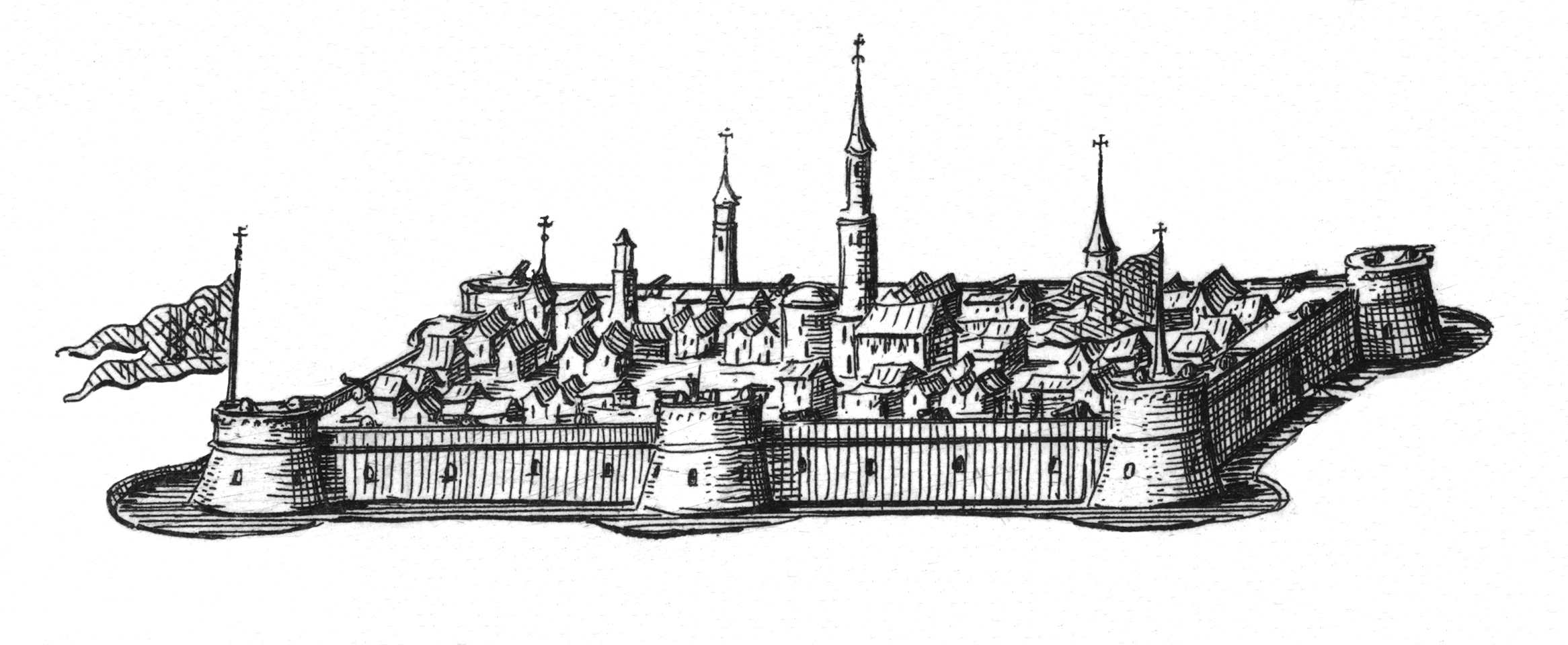
Etching of the Castle of Bouka by Giovanni Giacomo de Rossi, 1687

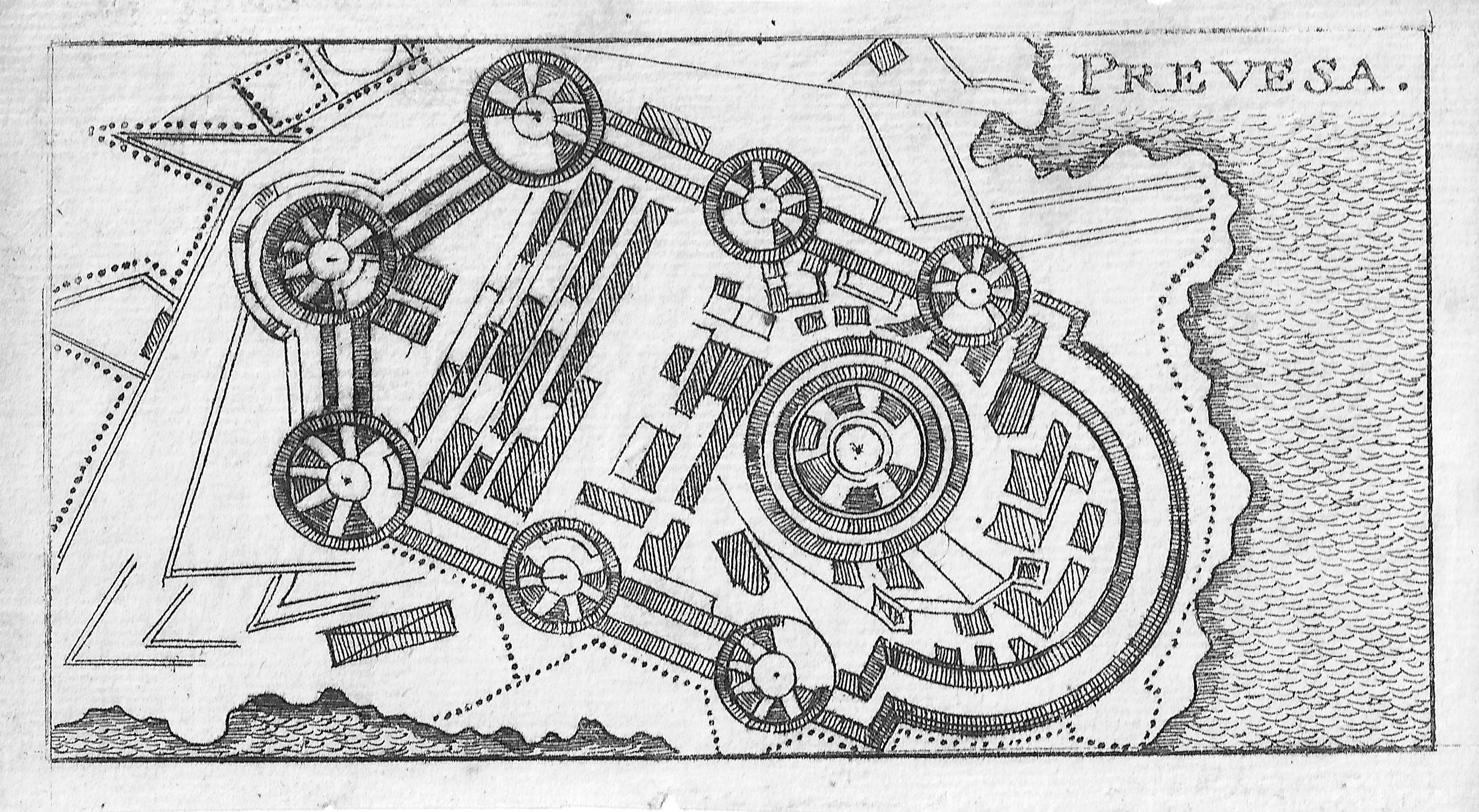
Woodcut of the Castle of Bouka by Leonhard Loschge, 1687

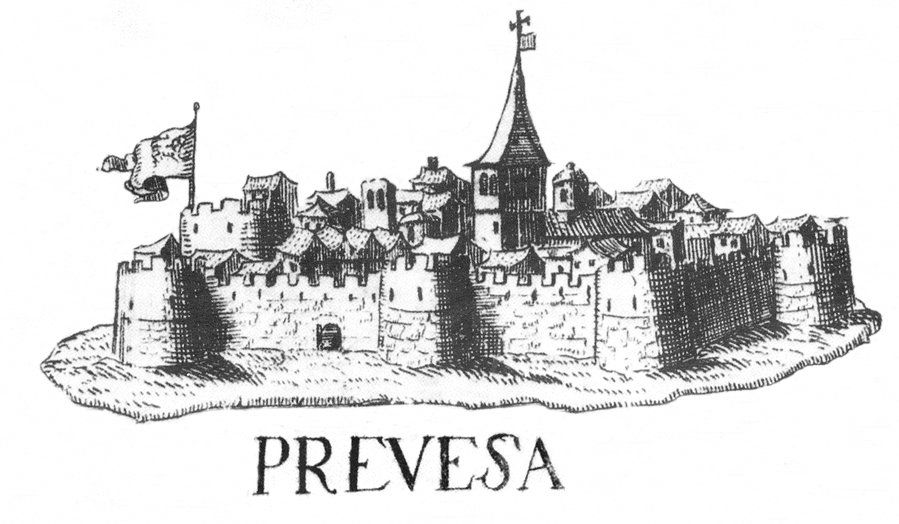
Etching of the Castle of Bouka by Vincenzo Coronelli, 1688

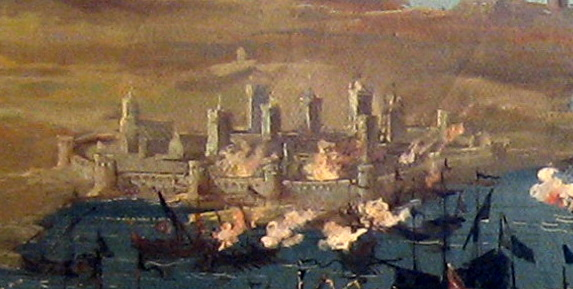
The Castle of Bouka.
Detail of an oil painting by an unknown artist, c. 1690

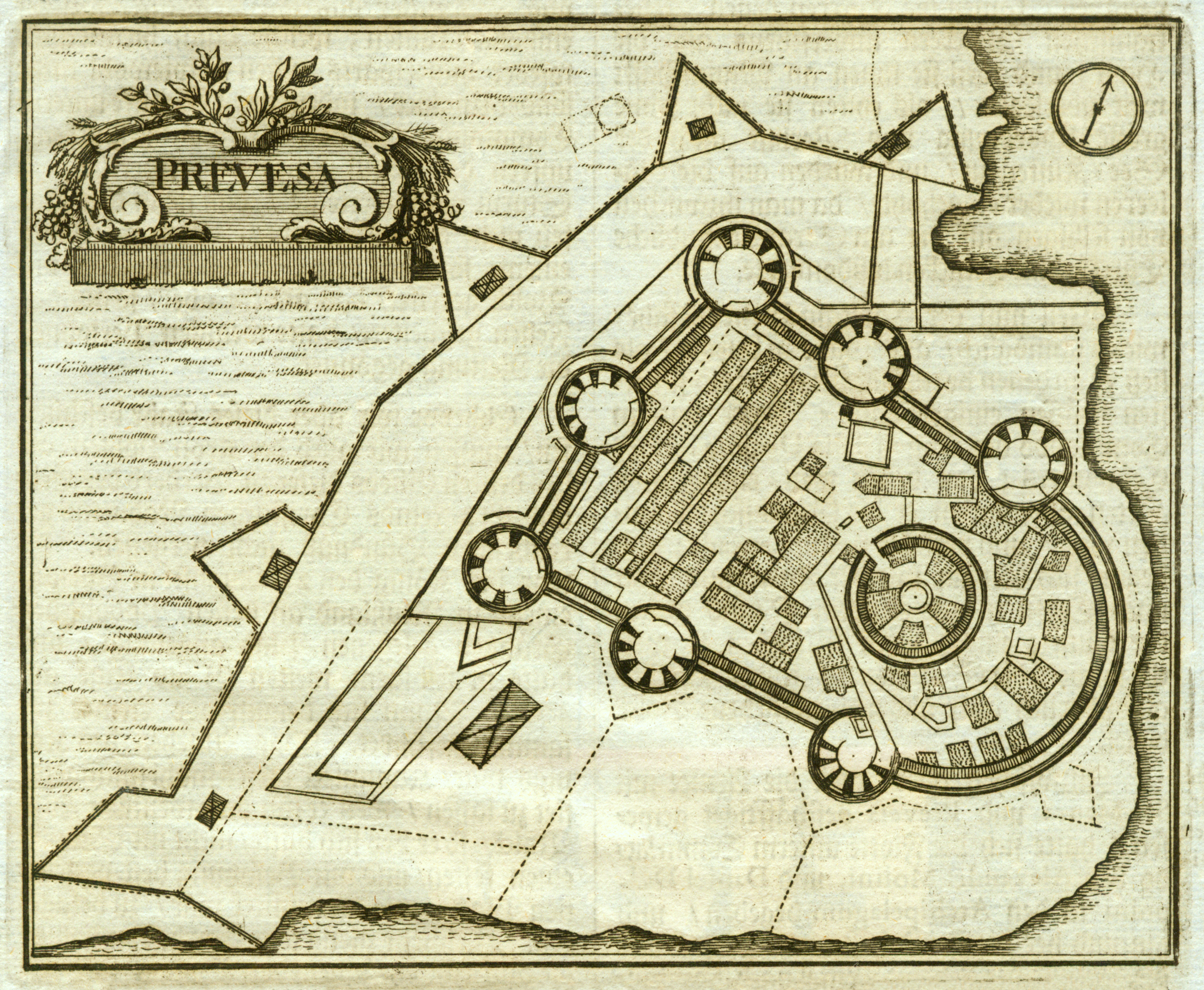
Etching of the Castle of Bouka by Johann Andreas Thelott, 1701

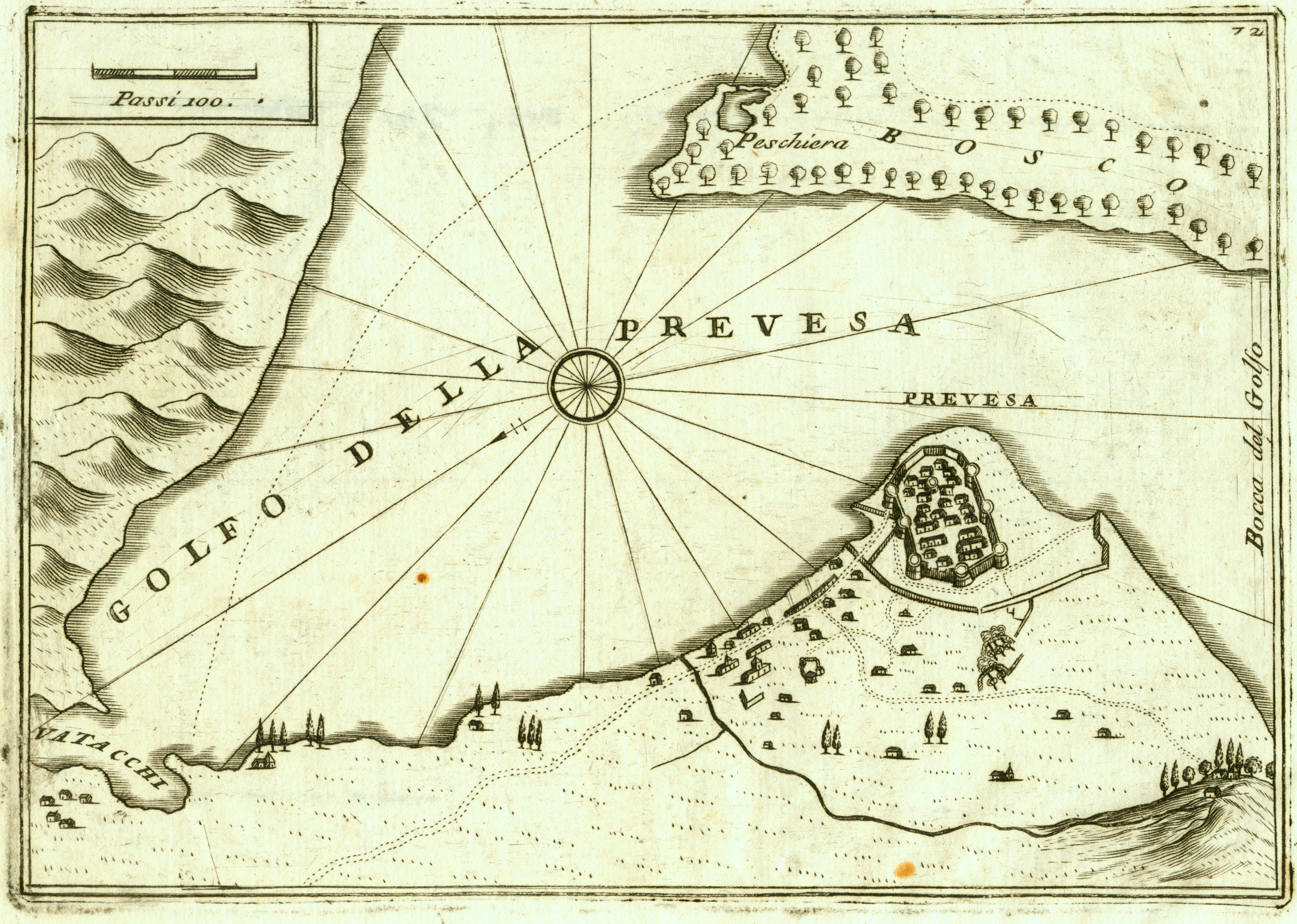
Etching of the Castle of Bouka by Vincenzo Coronelli, 1707

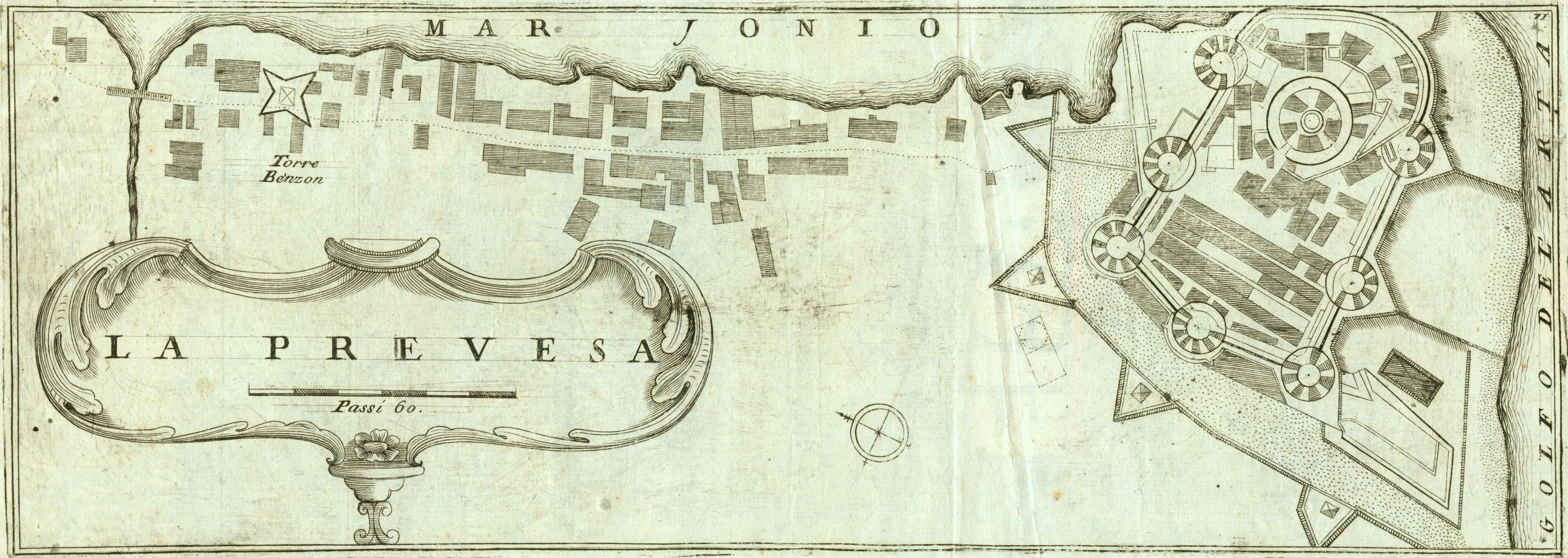
Etching of the Castle of Bouka by Vincenzo Coronelli, 1707
