= Ignaz Lachner =

German composer and conductor

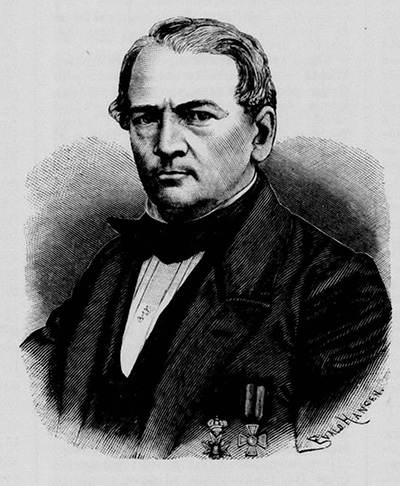
- Ignaz Lachner. Xylography 1882
- Occupations: composer and conductor

Ignaz Lachner (11 September 1807 – 24 February 1895) was a German composer and conductor.

== Life and career ==
Lachner was born into a musical family at Rain am Lech. He was the second of the three famous Lachner brothers. Lachner's brothers Franz and Vinzenz were also composers. His older brother Franz was the best known, having heavily traded on his youthful friendship with Franz Schubert, certainly more than Ignaz who also knew Schubert. Ignaz was taught (as were the others) organ, piano and violin. Upon the latter instrument, he was somewhat of a prodigy, but despite this, his father insisted he become a teacher. After his father’s death, he studied violin with Bernhard Molique, a violin virtuoso and then joined his brother Franz in Vienna, where he too befriended and was influenced by Schubert. Haydn, Mozart and Beethoven were also influences.

In 1826, he became organist at the Reformed Church in Vienna and then a member of the orchestra at the Hofoperntheater. He was appointed a Music Director in Stuttgart in 1831 and soon thereafter in Munich. From 1853, Lachner served as a Kapellmeister in Hamburg and moved into the same position again in 1861 at the Stadttheater in Frankfurt, from which he retired in 1875. He died in Hanover.

Although primarily known as a conductor, Lachner composed a considerable amount of music in almost every genre. Among his best known and most successful compositions were his Alpine Scenes, Das letzte Fensterln, although critics, such as Wilhelm Altmann, today generally consider his chamber music to be his best work. Of these, his six trios for the unusual combination of violin, viola and piano were among the best ever written for this combination and his seven string quartets achieved considerable popularity in their time by virtue of their fetching melodies and effective harmonies. Several of the quartets and all of the piano trios have been recorded. There is also a recording of his Toy Symphony, op. 85.

== Chamber music ==
- Sonata in D major for violin and piano, Op. 73 (1873)
- 6 Tänze (6 Dances) for violin and piano, Op. 80 (1876)
- Serenade in B♭ major for violin and piano, Op. 81 (1876)
- 3 Morceaux de salon for violin and piano, Op. 93 (1890)
- String Quartet No. 1 in F major, Op. 43
- String Quartet No. 2 in G major, Op. 51 (1856)
- String Quartet No. 3 in C major, Op. 54
- String Quartet No. 4 in A major, Op. 74 (1873)
- String Quartet No. 5 in G major, Op. 104
- String Quartet No. 6 in a minor, Op. 105 (1895)
- String Quartet No. 7 in B♭ major, Op. posthumous
- String Quartet in C major for 3 violins and viola, Op. 106
- String Quartet in G major for 4 violins, Op. 107
- String Quintet in C major, Op. 8 (1840)
- Trio No. 1 in B♭ major for violin, viola and piano, Op. 37 (1851)
- Trio No. 2 in G major for violin, viola and piano, Op. 45 (1856)
- Trio No. 3 in D major for violin, viola and piano, Op. 58 (1868)
- Trio No. 4 in D minor for violin, viola and piano, Op. 89 (1879)
- Trio No. 5 in E♭ major for violin, viola and piano, Op. 102 (1893)
- Trio No. 6 in C major for violin, viola and piano, Op. 103 (1893)

== Orchestral Music ==
Concertino in F major for Horn, Bassoon & Orchestra, Op 43(?) (1850)
