= Tabula Hungariae =

Earliest surviving printed map of Hungary

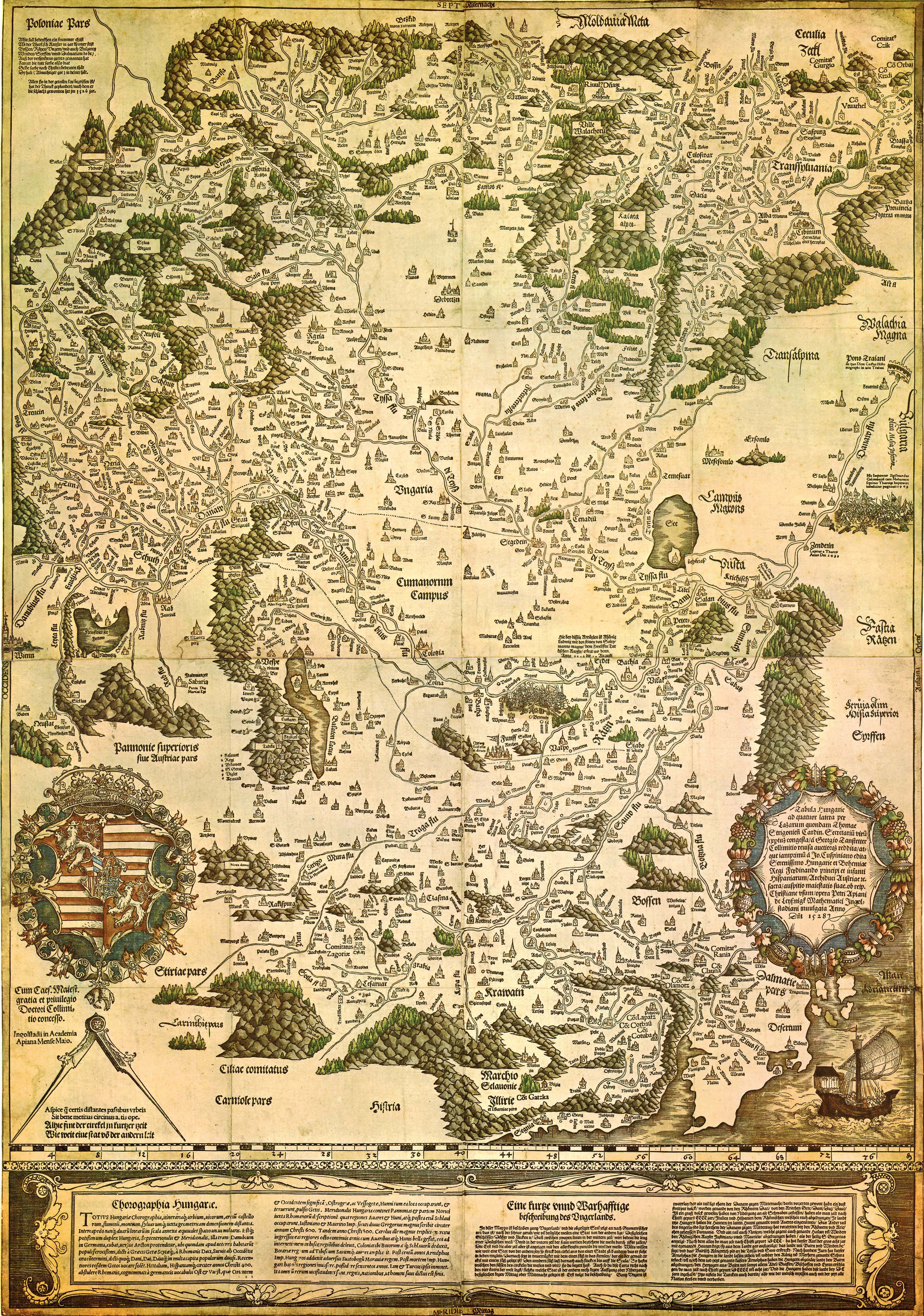
Tabula Hungariae, Ingolstadt, 1528

Tabula Hungariae (also Lázár's map) is the earliest surviving printed map of Hungary, which has supposedly been made by Hungarian Lázár deák before 1528. It was inscribed on UNESCO's Memory of the World Register in 2007.

== Description ==
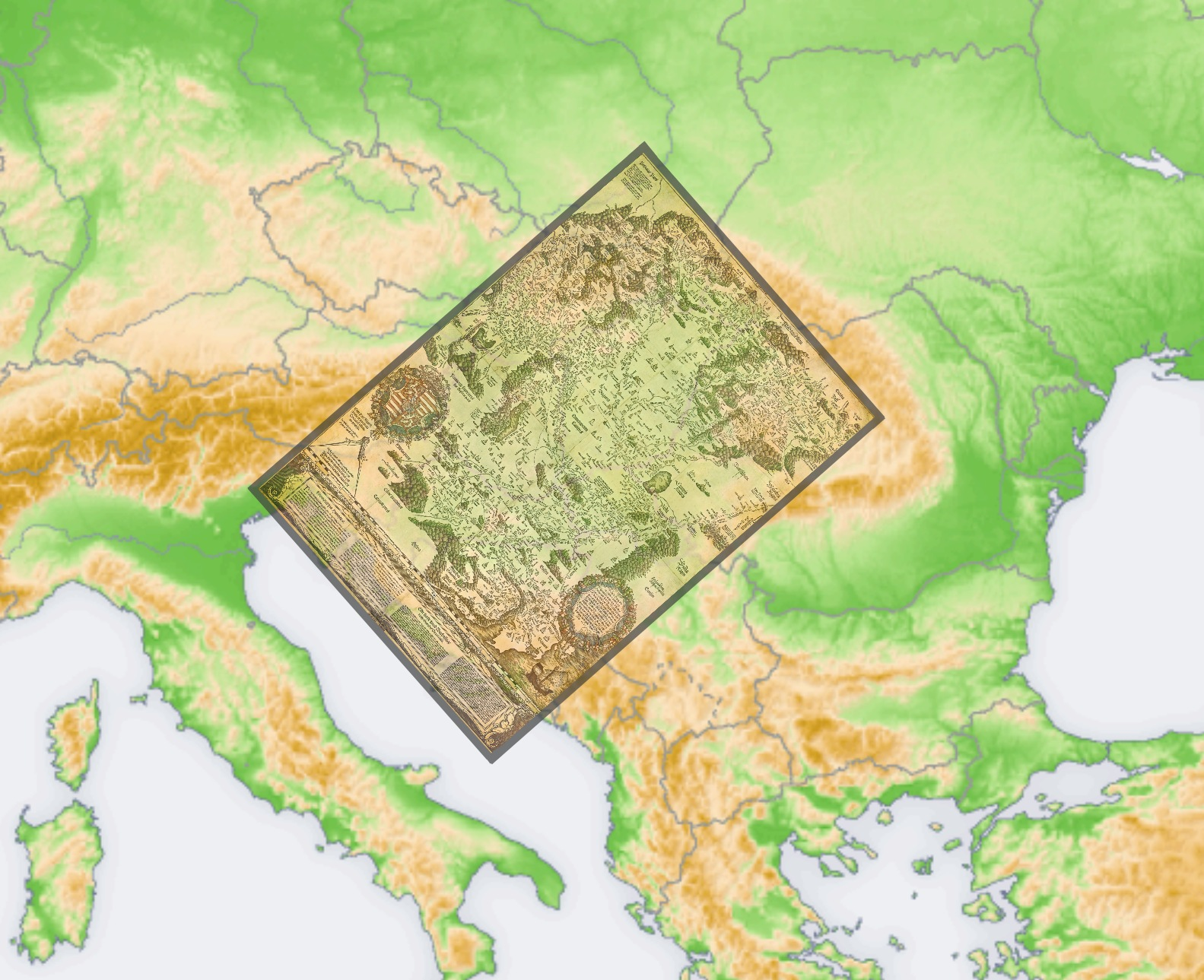
Approximate area covered by Tabula Hungariae.

The map is approximately 65×85 cm in size and is oriented in southwest–northeast direction. It shows the settlements and landmarks of the Kingdom of Hungary in the early 16th century. The southern areas occupied by the Ottoman Empire are marked with different colors. As the only covered parts outside the border are in the south, it is thought that the purpose of the creation of the map was the preparations for the war against the Ottomans. Some of the settlements shown on the map vanished during the years of Ottoman wars and oppression.

The most valued information on the map are the names and descriptions of settlements. There are approximately 1400 geographical names on the map, of which 1270 are names of settlements (365 on the territory of post-Trianon Hungary.)

At the bottom of the map is the description of the country in German and Latin.

=== Names of settlements ===
The geographical names were transcribed differently from today. For example, today's é was written ee, today's ö was ew. It is also noted that c is sometimes written tz, which is a characteristic of the Old High German orthography. These may be created by contributors, who prepared the work for printing. However, with some other names, Lázár used the pronunciation of Hungarian dialects.

== Printing ==
The map was printed with the aid of Georg Tannstetter, was paid by Johannes Cuspinianus, in the press of Petrus Apianus in Ingolstadt.

== Legacy ==
There were only a few maps printed, almost all of them lost through history, so researchers could only know it from descriptions. However, in the early 1880s, one map was unexpectedly found. It was bought by collector Sándor Apponyi in 1882. The map was transferred in 1924 to the National Széchényi Library, and is also there currently.

== Later versions ==
There had been made several copies of the original map until 1552 but these did not survive. However, there were maps made using Lázár's map also after 1552, with title Tabula Hungariae, illetve Nova descriptio totius Hungariae. Six different versions are known:

- Giovanni Andrea Vavassore (worked 1510–1572), Venice, 1553
- Pirro Ligorio (1496-1583), Rome, 1558 (lost), 1599
- Antonio Lafreri (1512-1577), Rome, 1558, 1559, 156?
- János Zsámboky (1531-1584), Vienna, 1566
- Claudio Duchetti (1554-1597), Rome, 1577
- Giovanni Orlandi (worked 1600–1604), Rome, 1602
