= Franz Lachner =

German composer and conductor (1803–1890)

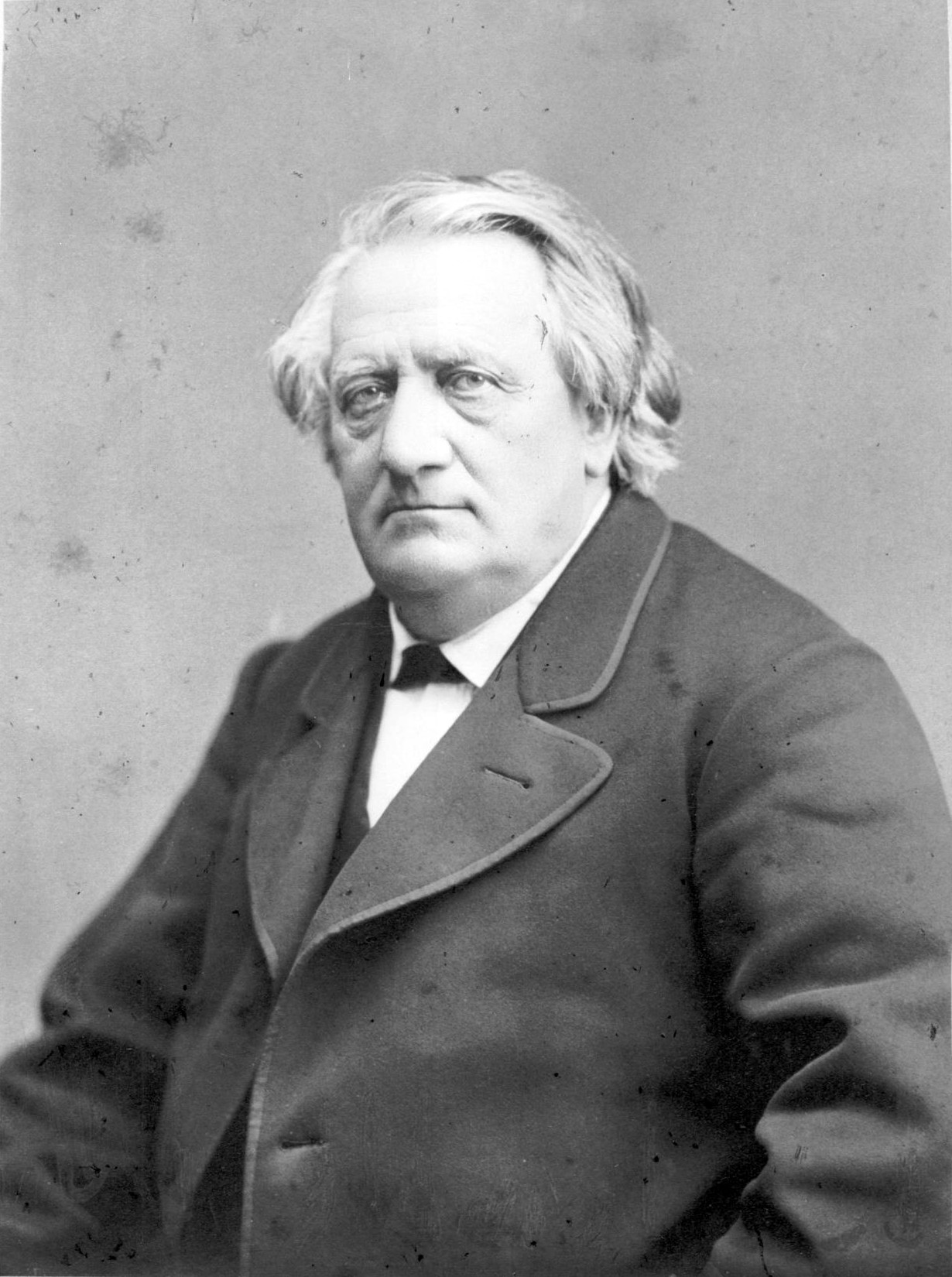

Franz Paul Lachner (2 April 1803 – 20 January 1890) was a German composer and conductor.

== Biography ==
Lachner was born in Rain am Lech to a musical family (his brothers Ignaz, Theodor and Vinzenz also became musicians). He studied music with Simon Sechter and Maximilian Stadler. He conducted at the Theater am Kärntnertor in Vienna where he met Beethoven and Schubert. In 1834, he became Kapellmeister at Mannheim. As a result of composers' aesthetic comparisons of Beethoven's symphonic output with efforts afterwards, in 1835, there was a competition in Vienna for the best new symphony sponsored by Tobias Haslinger of the music publishing firm with no fewer than 57 entries. Lachner received first prize with his 5th Symphony Sinfonia passionata, or Preis-Symphonie and became royal Kapellmeister at Munich, becoming a major figure in its musical life, conducting at the opera and various concerts and festivals. His career there came to a sudden end in 1864 after Richard Wagner's disciple Hans von Bülow took over Lachner's duties. Lachner remained officially in his post on extended leave for a few years until his contract expired.

== Work ==
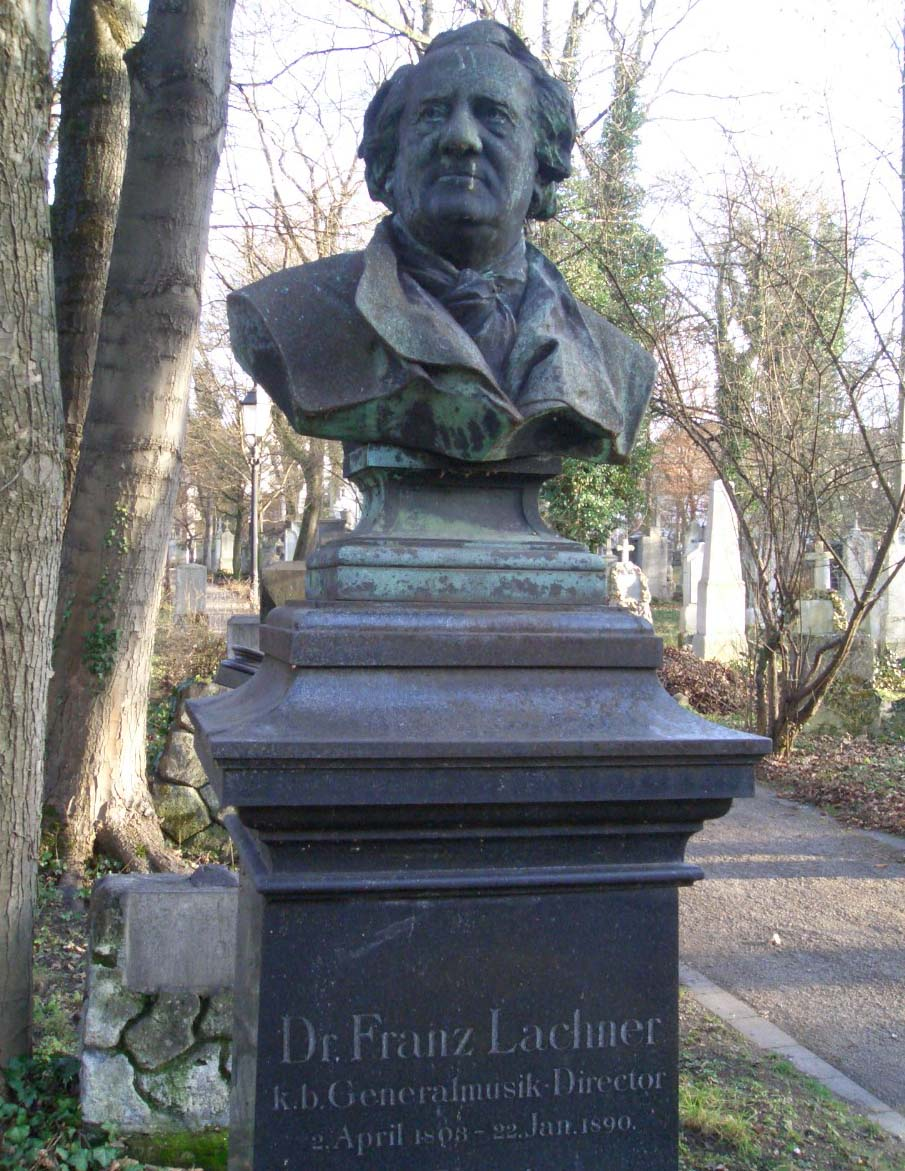
Bust of Lachner on his grave at the Alter Südfriedhof in Munich

Lachner was a well-known and prolific composer in his day, though he is not now considered a major composer. His work, influenced by his friends Ludwig van Beethoven and Franz Schubert, is regarded as competent and craftsman-like, but is now generally little known. This regard may be attributed to Lachner’s conservative approaches to composition, which position him anachronistically as a Classical composer, rather than among his contemporaries in the early Romantic period. His symphonies use the larger forces introduced by Beethoven, but “his structures, tonal palette, and melodic development are stolidly Mozartean.” Among his greatest successes were his opera Catarina Cornaro (1841, preceding Donizetti's opera by three years), his Requiem, and his seventh orchestral suite (1881).

In the present day it may be his organ sonatas (Opp. 175, 176, 177) and chamber music, in particular his music for wind instruments, that receive the most attention, though his string quartets and some of his eight symphonies have been performed and recorded. His songs, some of which are set to the same texts that Schubert used, contributed to the development of the German Lied.

For performances of Cherubini's Médée in Frankfurt in 1855, Lachner composed recitatives to replace the original spoken dialogue, and it was this version, translated into Italian, which was used in many twentieth-century revivals and recordings of that opera, most notably those with Maria Callas in the title role.
