= Georg Tannstetter =

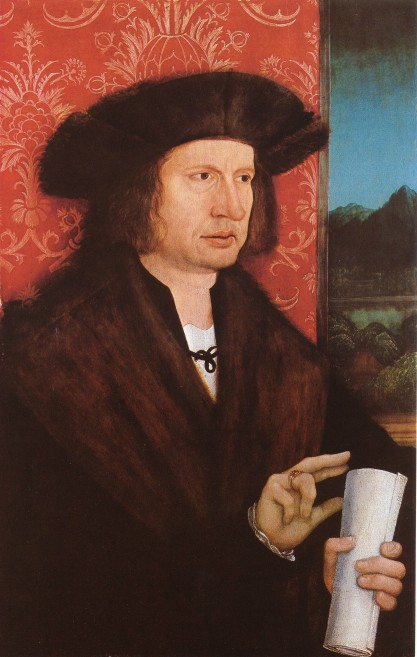
Portrait ca. 1515, by Bernhard Strigel

Georg Tannstetter (April 1482 – 26 March 1535), also called Georgius Collimitius, was a humanist teaching at the University of Vienna. He was a medical doctor, mathematician, astronomer, cartographer, and the personal physician of the emperors Maximilian I and Ferdinand I. He also wrote under the pseudonym of "Lycoripensis". His Latin name "Collimitius" is derived from limes meaning "border" and is a reference to his birth town: "Rain" is a German word for border or boundary.

Born in Rain am Lech in the Duchy of Bavaria, he studied in Ingolstadt. In 1503, he followed a call of Conrad Celtis to the University of Vienna, where he taught mathematics. He soon became a leading figure amongst the humanists in Vienna. In 1510, he became the personal physician of emperor Maximilian I, who would six years later ennoble him with the predicate "von Thanau".

He travelled with his student Joachim Vadian to Buda in 1518. After his earlier work in c. 1527 he edited a map of Hungary, today known as Tabula Hungariae, from the manuscript of Lazarus Secretarius, a Hungarian clerk. The map was published by Johannes Cuspinianus, printed 1528 in Ingolstadt by Petrus Apianus; its unique copy is in the National Library of Hungary. It is generally praised for its details (c. 1300 settlements) and the relative accuracy of the distances between the settlements. It was one of the first regional maps, included a scale but the manuscript was seriously reshaped, so it is uneasy to recognize the geography of Hungary. Tannstetter is also considered a pioneer of the history of science with his work Viri Mathematici, containing biographies of mathematicians at the University of Vienna from the 15th century.

In 1530, he moved to Ferdinand's court at Innsbruck, where he died five years later.

== Selected works ==
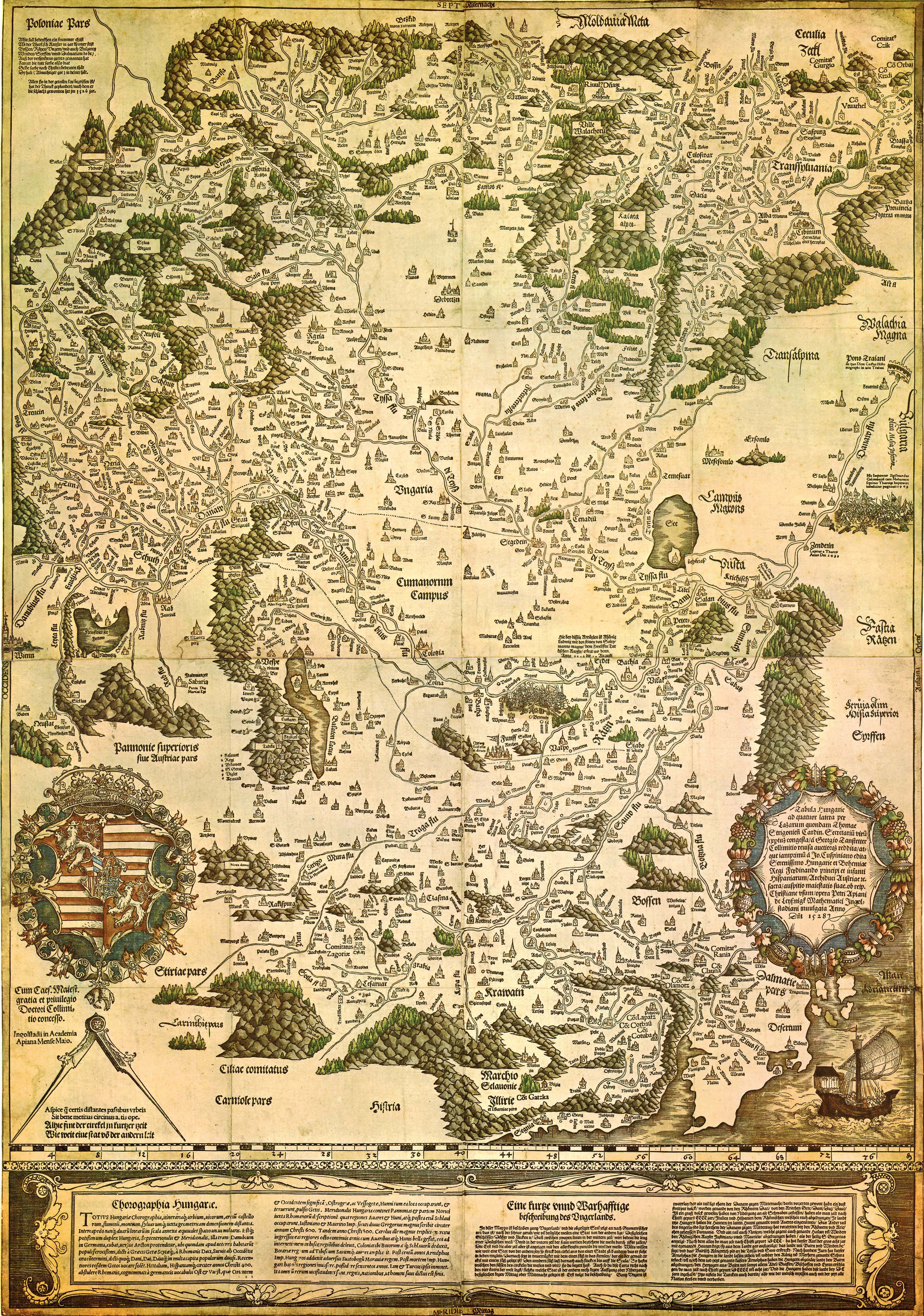
Tabula Hungarie ad quatuor latera

- Librum consolatorium contra opiniones de diluvio et aliis horrendis periculis anni 1523, Vienna 1523. A tract to counter the Flood hysteria of that year.
- Viri Mathematici
- Tabula Hungarie ad quatuor latera, The Lazarus map of Hungary. Ingolstadt 1528.
- Artificium De Applicatione Astrologiae ad Medicinam..., 1531.
