= Rain, Swabia =

Rain
- Municipality
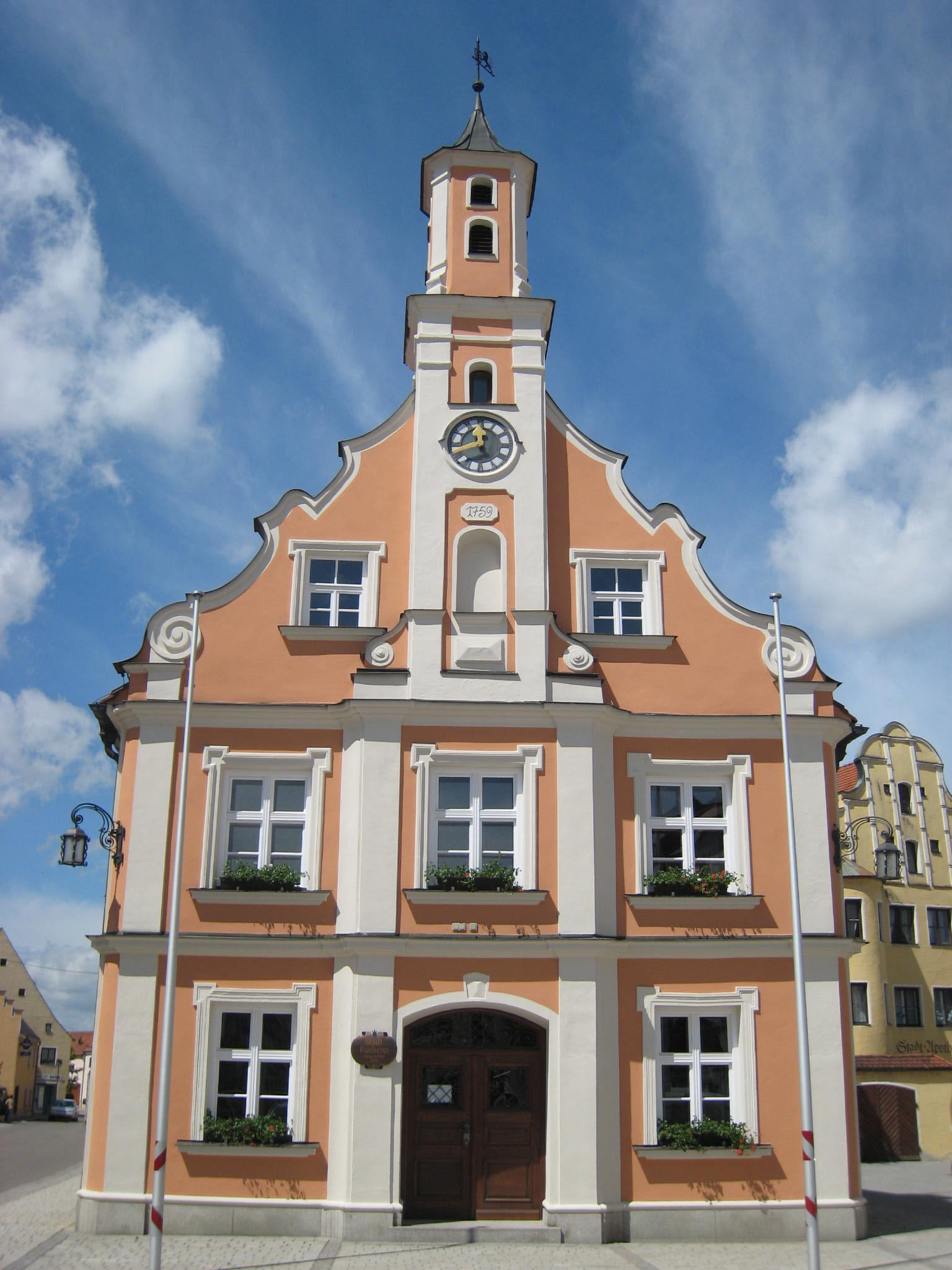
- Town hall

- Coat of arms

- Location of Rain within Donau-Ries district
- Interactive map of Rain
- Location within Germany Location within Bavaria
- Coordinates: 48°41′N 10°55′E
- Country: Germany
- State: Bavaria
- Admin. region: Schwaben
- District: Donau-Ries

Government
  - Mayor (2020–2026): Karl Rehm

Area
  - Total: 77.13 km^{2} (29.78 sq mi)
- Elevation: 402 m (1,319 ft)

Population (2025-12-31)
  - Total: 9,197
  - Density: 119.2/km^{2} (308.8/sq mi)
- Time zone: UTC+01:00 (CET)
  - Summer (DST): UTC+02:00 (CEST)
- Postal codes: 86641
- Dialling codes: 09090
- Vehicle registration: DON
- Website: www.rain.de

Rain (German pronunciation: [ʁaɪn]; also: Rain (Lech)) is a town in the Donau-Ries district, in Bavaria, Germany. It is situated on the river Lech, close to its confluence with the Danube, 11 km east of Donauwörth.

== Geography ==
Rain is on the B16 road and served by the Ingolstadt–Neuoffingen railway (part of the Danube Valley Railway—Donautalbahn), both of which run between Ulm and Regensburg.

== History ==
The earliest reference to Rain is in a document of the monastery at Niederschönenfeld dated 4 July 1257, wherein it is described as a civitas nostra or ducal town. It is most probable that Rain was founded during the reign of Otto II Wittelsbach, Duke of Bavaria (1248–1253) or at the latest in the reign of Louis II, Duke of Bavaria (1253–1294) before 1257.

Rain was founded for economic and strategic reasons. The town protected Bavaria from the northwest and collected customs from its bridge over the river Lech.

On 15 April 1632, during the Thirty Years War, the Battle of Rain took place. The Protestant army of Gustavus Adolphus of Sweden defeated the army of the Catholic League commanded by Johann Tserclaes von Tilly. Tilly withdrew his troops to Ingolstadt, where he died from tetanus from an infected gunshot wound in his thigh.

In 1914 a monument commemorating Tilly was erected in front of Rain's Rococo town hall. Rain's architectural heritage also includes the Roman Catholic parish church of St John the Baptist, which features late Gothic frescoes dating from about 1480. There is also the Swabian Gate, the historic Spital with its All Saints' chapel and the former castle.

Rain has three museums: the Lachner Brothers Museum, Homeland Museum and Jean-Duprai-Museum. The four Lachner brothers, Theodor, Franz, Ignaz and Vinzenz, were nineteenth-century German composers, all of whom were born in the town.

Other historic figures from Rain include lawyer and astronomer Johann Bayer (1562–1625), humanist Georg Tannstetter (1482–1535) and pianist Michael Raucheisen (1889–1984).

== Economy ==
Rain is the headquarters of the Dehner chain of garden centres, which employs 1,100 people in the town. Rain's other industries include a sugar refinery employing 240–280 people. Recently, Sunstar Group built Sunstar Engineering Germany, an adhesives and sealants factory, in Rain.

== Twin towns ==
Rain is twinned with Tougan, capital of Sourou Province in Burkina Faso.

== Mayors ==
- Otto Spreitler, temporary (1945)
- Josef Müller (1945–1948)
- Carl Faig (1948–1966)
- Karl Würmseher, PWG (1966–1990)
- Gerhard Martin, SPD (1990–2020)
- Karl Rehm, PWG (since 2020)

== Other people ==
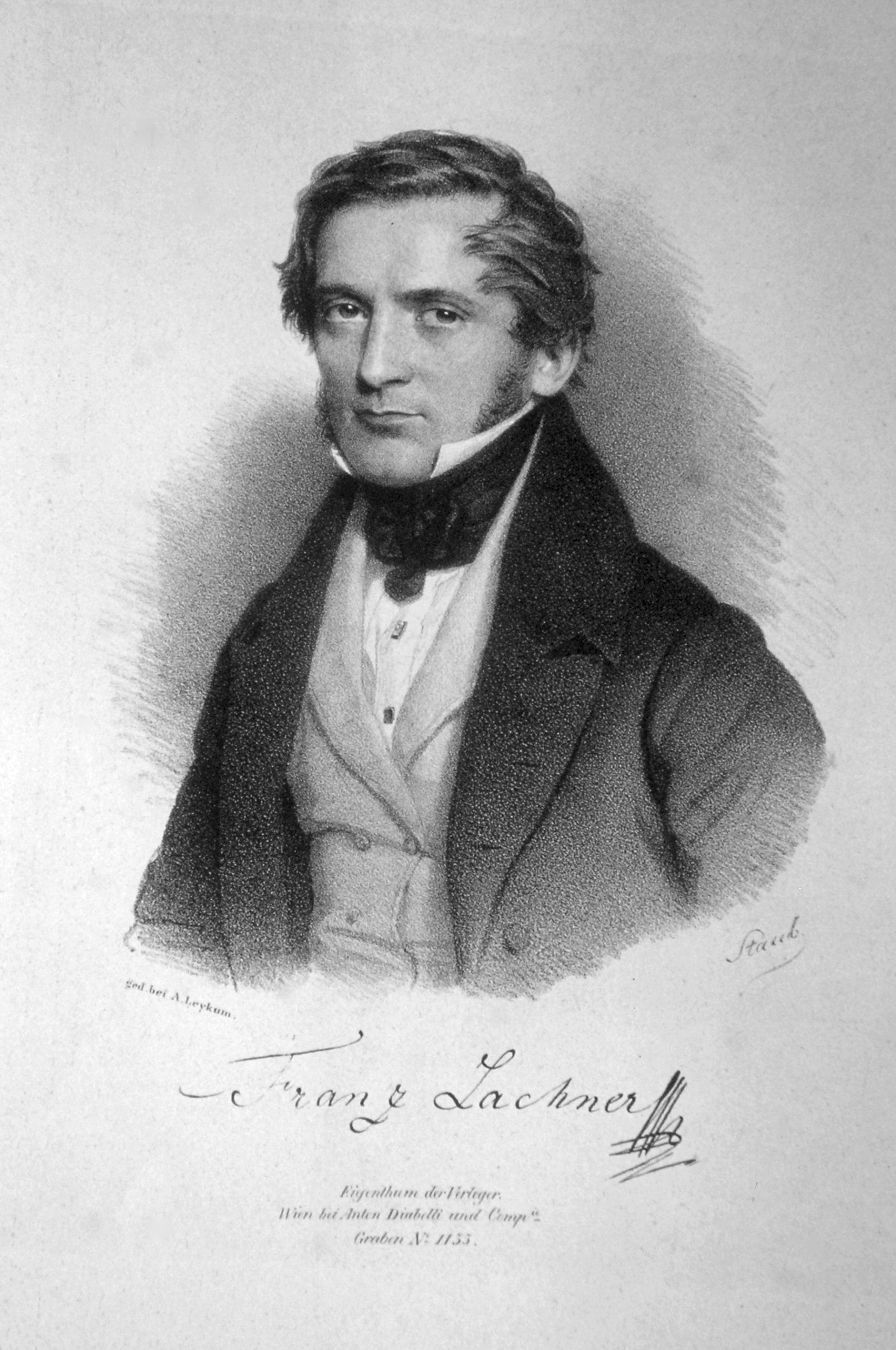
Franz Lachner around 1835

- Georg Tannstetter, called Collimitius (1482–1535), scholar and humanist
- Johannes Bayer (1572–1625), jurist and creator of the Uranometria
- Franz Lachner (1803–1890), musician
- Ignaz Lachner (1807–1895), musician
- Vinzenz Lachner (1811–1893), musician
- Michael Raucheisen (1889–1984), pianist and composer
- Georg Weber (1910–1986), entrepreneur
- Dieter Reiter (born 1958), politician (SPD), Mayor of Munich from May 2014 until April 2026
