= Vinzenz Lachner =

German composer and conductor (1811–1893)

Vinzenz Lachner (also spelled Vincenz) (19 July 1811 – 22 January 1893) was a German composer and conductor.

== Early life ==
Born in Rain am Lech, Vinzenz was the youngest brother of Franz Lachner, also a composer and conductor. The elder Lachner was known as a close friend of composer Franz Schubert. As a composer Vinzenz was essentially self-taught. He was first educated by his father Anton Lachner, the municipal organist. After Anton's death, Vinzenz was schooled in Augsburg.

== Career ==
Vinzenz scratched out a living by teaching music in Augsburg until his brother Franz arranged for him to become conductor and house musician for Earl Mycielski of Coscevitz in the Grand Duchy of Posen. (Note: Earl Mycielski may be Józef Nikodem Mycielski (1794-1867) of the noble Mycielski family. His father had died in 1815, and he was the eldest son. Coscevitz is a well-attested placename in connection with Lachner, and could be the German exonym for Chocieszewice, Józef's birthplace and presumably family seat. Neither place seems easy to locate.) In 1831 he moved to Vienna to continue his musical training, becoming assistant conductor at the Court Opera and organist at a Protestant church (though he himself was Catholic). In 1836 he became court conductor at Mannheim in succession to Franz, where he was so highly valued that his contract was renewed and extended whenever he received offers from other musical centres. In all he remained there for 37 years, during which Mannheim had the reputation of performing the largest repertoire of operas of any city in Germany. Nevertheless, Lachner travelled and conducted widely, as far afield as London.

As an educator, he encountered and encouraged many. His students included Fritz Steinbach. Lachner encouraged a number of prominent younger musicians, notably Max Bruch, Hermann Levi, and Carl Wolfsohn. See: List of music students by teacher: K to M#Vinzenz Lachner.

Instinctively conservative in his tastes, Lachner stood out publicly against the cult of Richard Wagner, but the formation of a Wagner Association in Mannheim at the beginning of the 1870s was the beginning of the end for his career. Wagner himself came to conduct in Mannheim. Having already engineered the removal of Franz Lachner from Munich, Wagner campaigned for Vinzenz Lachner to be retired. (Vinzenz, to Wagner's rage, had conducted Wagner's opera The Flying Dutchman in a mutilated version.)

Vinzenz Lachner retired as court conductor in 1873. He settled afterwards in Karlsruhe, where he continued to teach.

== Works ==
Lachner's compositions include symphonies, overtures, festive marches, works for wind orchestra; a Mass in D minor, a setting of the 100th Psalm and other choral works; incidental music to Schiller’s Turandot; a tone poem entitled Lagerleben; a Piano Quartet, String Trio, two String Quartets, 42 Variations on the C major scale, Op. 42, for piano or string quartet; Deutsche Tanzweisen for cello and piano; a set of Ländler for piano duet (dedicated to Brahms); and numerous songs of which the cycle Scherz im Ernst und Ernst im Scherz was popular during his lifetime. His song-cycle Frauenliebe und -leben appeared in c1839, not long before Robert Schumann made his better-known settings of Adelbert von Chamisso's poems.

Few of his works have been revived or reprinted, though a recording of the string quartets issued in 2005 reveals a minor master of that genre.

== Personal life ==
Like all the Lachner brothers, he was friendly with Johannes Brahms. In 1879, he wrote a letter to Brahms asking why he had used trombones, tuba, and a drumroll — trombones being associated with death — early in the pastoral first movement of his Second Symphony. Brahms replied in detail, expressing the "great and genuine" pleasure he received from the letter, calling Lachner's analyses unusually perceptive and insightful, then saying "I would have to confess that I am, by the by, a severely melancholic person, that black wings are constantly flapping above us".

Lachner died in Karlsruhe after a number of strokes at age 81.
