= Giovanni Orlandi =

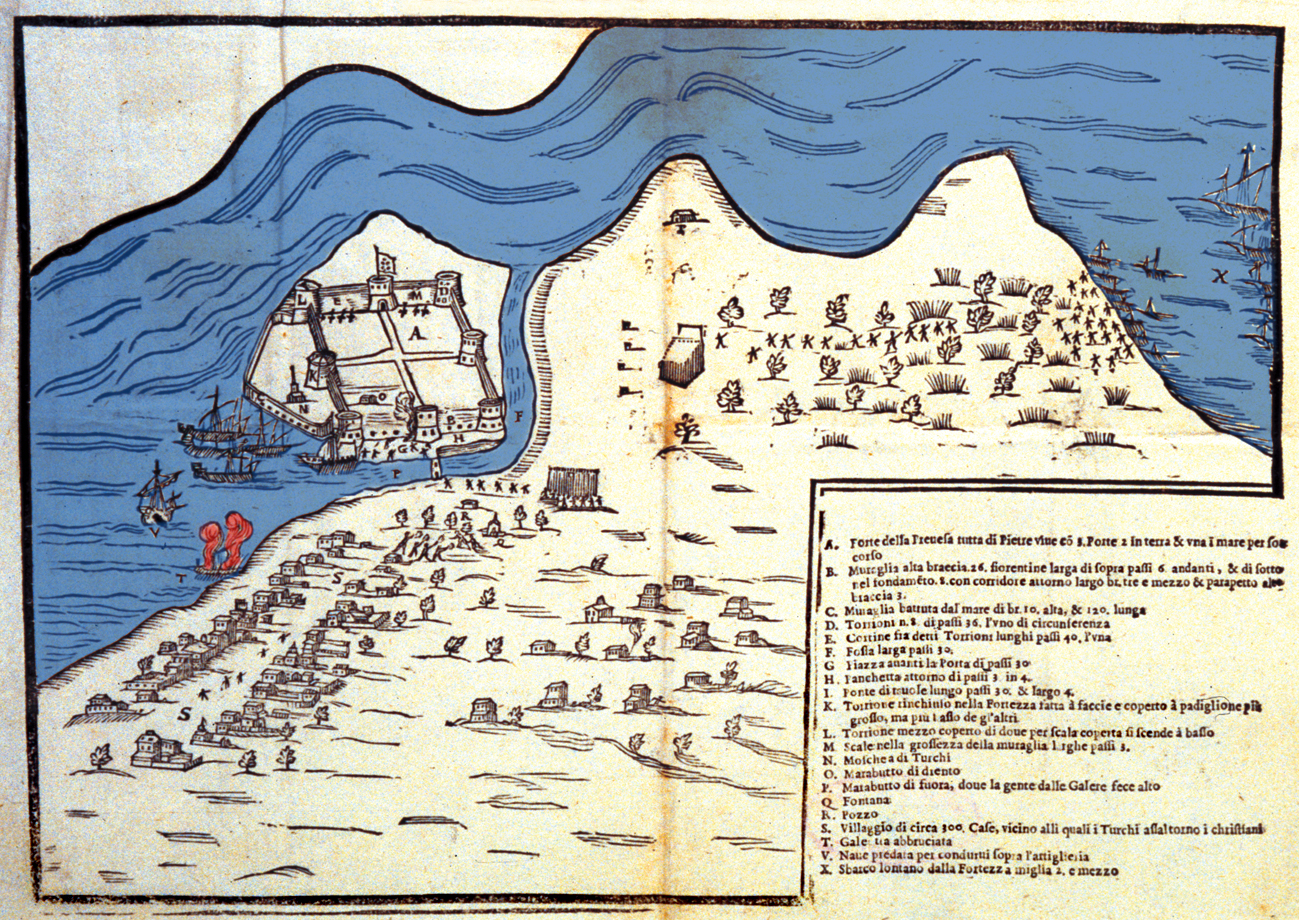
Woodcut by Giovanni Orlandi, depicting the attack of Preveza, by the knights of St. Stephen, in May 1605.

Giovanni Orlandi was an Italian engraver and print publisher active at the end of the 16th century and the first half of the 17th century.

A pupil of Cornelis Cort, Giovanni Orlandi was active in Rome and subsequently Naples between 1590 and 1640. He produced engravings predominantly after Michelangelo and Raphael. Of his considerable output, mention should be made of a series of portraits, a plan of Preveza dated in 1605, and a plan of Genoa dated 1637, as well as a series of grotesques which figured in the work of Nicasius Russell.
